= Dubuc =

Dubuc or du Buc may refer to:

== Places ==
- Dubuc (electoral district), a provincial electoral district in Quebec, Canada
- Dubuc, Saskatchewan

== People ==
- Aimée du Buc de Rivéry (1768–?), French heiress
- Alain Dubuc, Canadian journalist
- Alfred Dubuc (1871–1947), member of the Canadian House of Commons
- Jean Dubuc (1888–1958), Major League Baseball pitcher
- Jean Dubuc (politician) (born 1941), Canadian politician
- Jessika Dubuc (born 1983), Canadian synchronized swimmer
- Joseph Dubuc (1840–1914), Canadian lawyer and politician
- Lucien Dubuc (1877–1956), Canadian lawyer, judge and politician
- Luis Dubuc (born 1985), musician from Texas
- Marianne Dubuc (illustrator) (born 1980), Canadian writer and illustrator
- Marianne Dubuc (figure skater) (born 1983), Canadian figure skater
- Maryse Dubuc (born 1977), Canadian comics writer
- Nancy Dubuc, American businesswoman
- Nicole Dubuc (born 1978), American writer
- Pierre Dubuc (born 1947), Canadian editor, founder of L'aut'journal
- Roger Dubuc, French tennis player
- Louis-François Dubuc (1759–1827), French colonial administrator
