= John Gough Brick =

- Portrait of John Gough Brick ca. late 1890s
- Born: 1836; Upton-upon-Severn
- Died: 1897 (aged 60–61); New York City
- Occupation: Anglican missionary
- Spouse: Emma Marie Newson

John Gough Brick (28 March 1836 – 13 December 1897) was an English-Canadian Anglican missionary. He revealed the possibilities of growing wheat in Peace River Country, becoming the first man to seriously start agriculture in the area.

== Life ==
John Gough Brick was born on 28 March 1836 in Upton-upon-Severn to Benjamin Brick and Mary Morris.

He married Emma Marie Newson on 21 February 1861 at the Elim Chapel in Fetter Lane in London. With her he had nine children. One of his sons, Thomas Allen Brick, became the first farmer in Peace River to grow wheat commercially and he was elected to the Legislative Assembly of Alberta for Peace River when Alberta became a province in 1905.

In 1882, Brick came to Western Canada for the Church of England to take over the Anglican mission at Fort Dunvegan. In 1887, he would found an Anglican Mission in Shaftesbury Settlement eventually starting a mission farm.

During the winter of 1892 a sample of his Red Fife wheat was sent to the Dominion Department of Agriculture, in Ottawa, which was placed in the Dominion exhibit at the World's Fair at Chicago. The sample won first prize, the government currently holds the medal for the award.

He died on 13 December 1897 in New York City.

== Significance ==
On 7 June 1954, the Canadian government placed Brick on the list of Persons of National Historic Significance.

A plaque is dedicated to Brick on the exterior wall of the Post Office in Peace River, Alberta.
