= Frank Oberle =

Frank Oberle may refer to:

- Frank Oberle Sr., Canadian politician, Progressive Conservative MP, 1972–1993
- Frank Oberle Jr., his son, Canadian politician, Alberta Progressive Conservative MLA for Peace River, 2004–2015
