= Euell =

Euell is a name. Notable people with this name include:

== Surname ==
- Jason Euell (born 1977), English football player
- Julian Euell (1929–2019), American jazz bassist

== Given name ==
- Euell Gibbons (1911–1975), American celebrity
- Euell Montgomery (1915–2004), Canadian politician
