= William Lampley =

Canadian politician

William Jerome Lampley
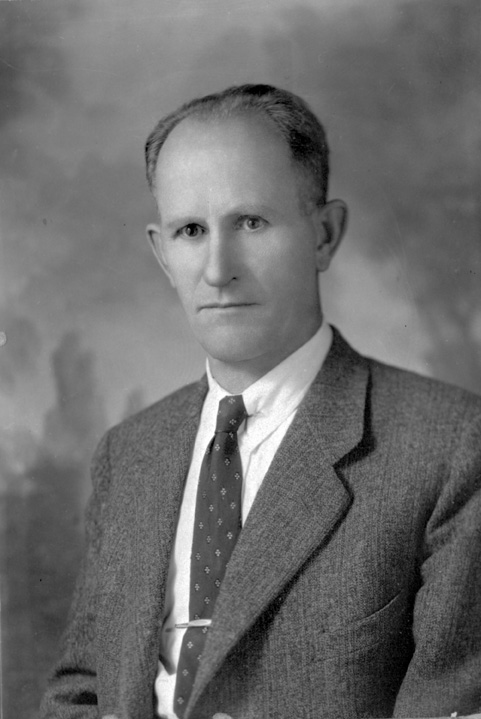

Member of the Legislative Assembly of Alberta
- In office August 22, 1935 – March 21, 1940
- Preceded by: William Bailey
- Succeeded by: Eld Martin
- Constituency: Peace River

Personal details
- Born: November 9, 1876 Burny, Tennessee
- Died: January 7, 1944 (aged 67) Peace River, Alberta
- Party: Social Credit
- Occupation: politician

William Jerome Lampley (November 9, 1876 – January 7, 1944) was a provincial politician from Alberta, Canada. He served as a member of the Legislative Assembly of Alberta from 1935 to 1940 sitting with the governing Social Credit caucus.

== Political career ==
Lampley ran for a seat to the Alberta Legislature in the 1935 Alberta general election as the Social Credit candidate for the Peace River provincial electoral district. He won a hotly contested race on the third count over three other candidates including incumbent UFA MLA William Bailey.

Lampley led on the first count, while the incumbent MLA running for re-election, Bailey, came in third in the First Count. The alternative voting (Instant runoff voting) system was in use to ensure majority representation. No candidate received majority of the votes in the first count in the 1935 Peace River contest. Elimination of the Conservative candidate and Bailey exhausted many votes as back-up preferences were not marked by many voters. On the third count, Lampley received a majority of votes still in play, maintaining his lead over the Liberal candidate's vote tally.

Lampley ran for re-election in the 1940 Alberta general election. He contested a straight fight against Independent candidate Eld Martin, who ran for the Conservative-Liberal Party Unity League. Lampley was defeated by just 139 votes.
