= Shaftesbury Settlement, Alberta =

Shaftsbury Settlement
- Designated place
- Location of Shaftsbury Settlement Shaftsbury Settlement (Canada)
- Coordinates: 56.154°N 117.457°W
- Country: Canada
- Province: Alberta
- Region: Northern Alberta
- Census division: 19
- Municipal district: Municipal District of Peace No. 135

Government
  - Type: Unincorporated
  - Governing body: Municipal District of Peace No. 135 Council

Area (2021)
  - Land: 21.82 km^{2} (8.42 sq mi)

Population (2021)
  - Total: 182
  - Density: 8.3/km^{2} (21/sq mi)
- Time zone: UTC−06:00 (Alberta Time)
- Area codes: 780, 587, 825

Shaftesbury Settlement is an unincorporated community in Alberta, Canada within the Municipal District of Peace No. 135 that is recognized as a designated place by Statistics Canada. It is located on the southeast side of Highway 684, 4 km (2.5 mi) south of Highway 2. It is adjacent to the Town of Peace River to the north on the west shore of the Peace River.

The Shaftesbury Formation, a stratigraphic unit of the Western Canadian Sedimentary Basin was named for the settlement.

The community was named after Anthony Ashley-Cooper, 7th Earl of Shaftesbury. It was founded by Rev. John Gough Brick from Upton-upon-Severn, Worcestershire, in 1888 as an Anglican mission.

A telegraph line was extended from Edmonton to Shaftesbury in 1910 or 1911. This accommodated telephone communication as well and provided the first rapid means of news and communication for the area.

== Demographics ==
In the 2021 Census of Population conducted by Statistics Canada, Shaftesbury Settlement had a population of 182 living in 16 of its 22 total private dwellings, a change of −37.5% from its 2016 population of 291. With a land area of 21.82 km^{2} (8.42 sq mi), it had a population density of 8.3/km^{2} (21.6/sq mi) in 2021.

As a designated place in the 2016 Census of Population conducted by Statistics Canada, Shaftsbury Settlement had a population of 71 living in 30 of its 31 total private dwellings, a change of 42% from its 2011 population of 50. With a land area of 4.17 km^{2} (1.61 sq mi), it had a population density of 17.0/km^{2} (44.1/sq mi) in 2016.

== See also ==
- List of communities in Alberta
- List of designated places in Alberta
- List of settlements in Alberta
