= 1905 Alberta general election =

1905 Canadian election

- November 9, 1905

25 seats in the Legislative Assembly of Alberta 13 seats were needed for a majority
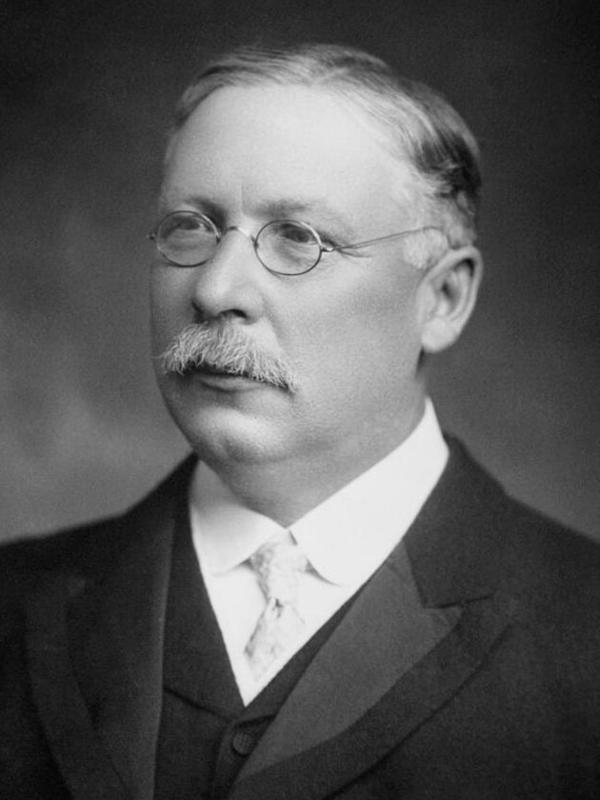

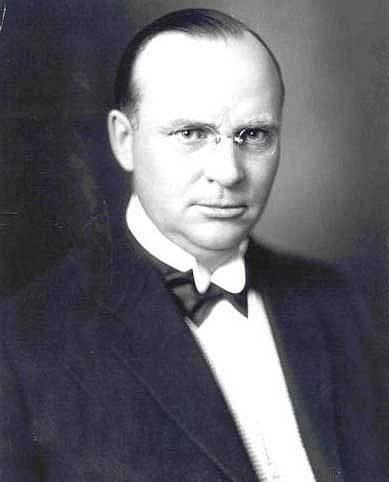
	Majority party	Minority party
Leader	Alexander Rutherford	R. B. Bennett
Party	Liberal	Conservative
Leader since	August 3, 1905	August 16, 1905
Leader's seat	Strathcona	Ran in Calgary (lost)
Last election	1	9
Seats won	23	2
Popular vote	14,485	9,342
Percentage	57.56%	37.13%
Premier before election
Alexander C. Rutherford
Liberal
Premier after election
Alexander C. Rutherford
Liberal

The 1905 Alberta general election was the first general election held in the province of Alberta, Canada, shortly after the province came into existence on September 1, 1905. The election was held on November 9, 1905, to elect twenty-five members to the 1st Alberta Legislative Assembly.

The Alberta Liberal Party, led by the recently appointed Premier Alexander C. Rutherford, received a majority of the votes cast and took twenty-three of the twenty-five seats in the new legislature, defeating the Conservative Party.

The Conservatives were led by young lawyer Richard Bennett, who later served as prime minister of Canada. The Conservatives had no strong leader to rally around at the time as the North-West Territories de facto-Premier Frederick Haultain had moved to the province of Saskatchewan.

The election was held using the first past the post system. The number of seats won by the Liberals was far above its portion of the popular vote. The Liberals received 57.6 per cent of the vote and 92 per cent of the seats.

The election took place just after the formation of the provinces of Alberta and Saskatchewan, composed of parts of the North-West Territories. Numerous high-profile issues arose prior to the election, including education rights for French Catholics through separate schools with public funding, the federal government retaining rights to public lands and minerals, and the competition between the cities of Edmonton and Calgary to be selected as the capital of the new province.

== Background ==
=== Government in the North-West Territories ===
After Confederation in 1867, the new Dominion of Canada sought to expand westward and fulfilk the provision of the British North America Act providing the option to admit Rupert's land to the Dominion. In that same year, Canada's Parliament expressed this desire to the United Kingdom and soon after entered into talks with the Hudson's Bay Company to arrange for the transfer of that Company's territory, Rupert's land.

After the Deed of Surrender was enacted, the United Kingdom transferred ownership of Rupert's Land and the North-Western Territory from the Hudson's Bay Company to the government of Canada. However, integration of the territories into Canadian Confederation was delayed by the Red River Rebellion around the Red River Colony. Eventually, the territories were admitted into Canadian Confederation on July 15, 1870, as the North-West Territories; barring the area around the Red River Colony, which was admitted into Canadian Confederation as the province of Manitoba.

The unelected Temporary North-West Council was formed under the Temporary Government Act, 1870, but the first appointments by the Government of Canada were delayed until December 28, 1872. The unelected body existed until The North-West Territories Act of 1875 came into force in October 1876, and the temporary council when it was replaced by the 1st Council of the North-West Territories, which consisted of appointed members, but with provisions for the election of members. A district of an area of 1,000 square miles (2,600 km^{2}) having 1,000 people could become an electoral district and elect one North-West Territories Council member. This created a patchwork of unrepresented and represented areas (areas directly represented by an elected member), and there was no official or independent boundaries commission, all electoral law at the beginning was under the purview of the Lieutenant Governor.

The boundary between Manitoba and the North-West Territories was in flux for some years. The North-West Territories population grew considerably along the Manitoba border during the 1870s. This drove calls for franchise by settlers in the region, and many settlers expressed a desire to be incorporated into Manitoba. In 1880 three electoral districts were created in the North-West Territories, two of which bordered the province of Manitoba. The federal government heeded the calls of the settlers and expanded the borders of Manitoba westward on July 1, 1881, encompassing much of the densely populated areas of the Territories.

Beginning in 1881, elected members began to sit in the North-West Territories Council. Under the terms of the North-West Territories Act of 1880, eligible electors were males who had reached the age of majority, which was 21 years of age at that time. The act specified that electors must be bona fide males who were not aliens or unfranchised Indians. Electors must also have resided in the territory for at least 12 months to the day of the writ being dropped. The first by-election occurred on March 23, 1881, in the Lorne district with Lawrence Clarke being elected to the council. The election was conducted by voice vote, a qualified elector would tell the returning officer at a polling station who he was going to vote for and the results would be tallied.

The ad hoc by-election system continued to operate until 1888 when the Temporary North-West Council was replaced with elected, somewhat responsible government by the establishment of a Legislative Assembly selected in the 1888 North-West Territories general election, and some legal experts appointed by the federal government. Robert Brett, the representative for the Red Deer district was appointed the Chairman of the Advisory Council, a cabinet like structure making Brett the de facto Premier of the North-West Territories.

Members at first were elected as non-partisan politicians, but some such as Frank Oliver were clearly members of a political party (Oliver was known to be a Liberal). The 1898 North-West Territories general election was a significant step toward party politics in the Territories as Frederick W. A. G. Haultain's Liberal-Conservative Party defeated Brett's Liberal Party to form government.

=== Drive to provincehood ===
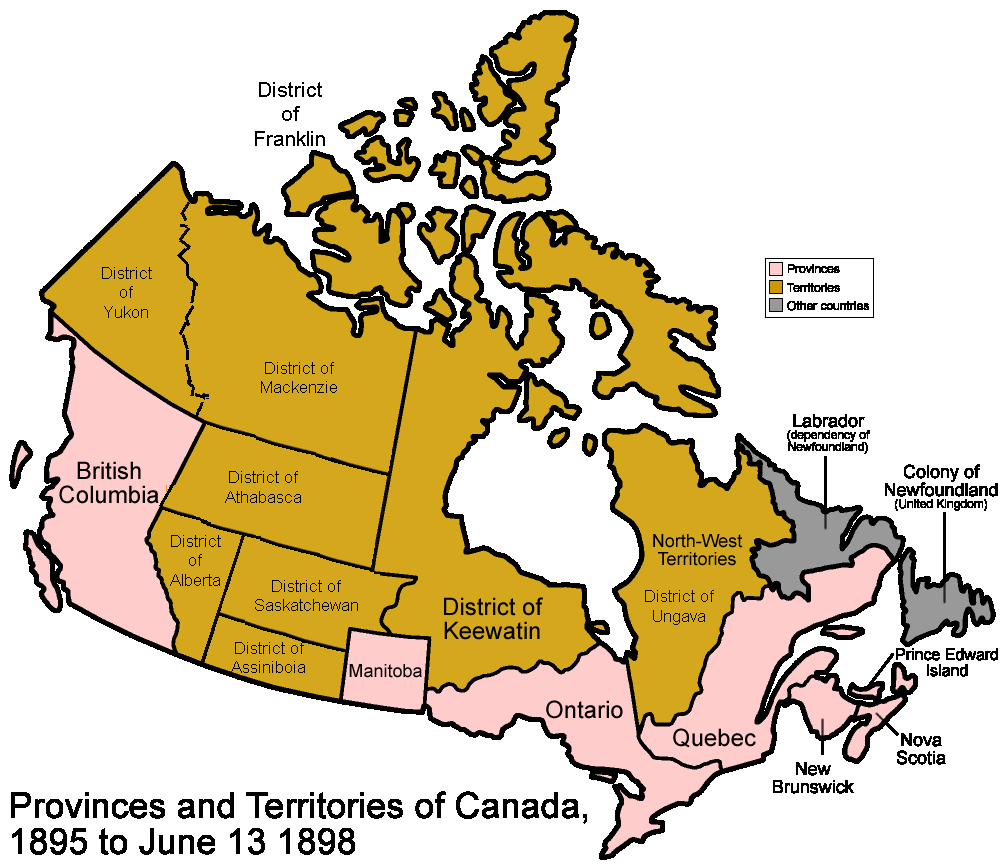
Districts of the Northwest Territories 1895-1898

The earliest calls for provincial autonomy in Alberta were made by Robert Brett in 1896, when he proposed the creation of a new province from the District of Alberta and the District of Athabasca. However, Brett's proposal was opposed by Premier Haultain who preferred the Territories form a single large province. In 1900, Haultain secured unanimous approval of a resolution asking the Government of Canada to inquire into the terms for provincial status of the Territories. A year later Haultain and Arthur Sifton met with the federal cabinet and submitted a draft constitution for a new province in the North-West Territories. Wilfrid Laurier's government was unwilling to consider the proposals, due to concerns about religious education, the delegation of authority, and general apathy towards provincehood by Frank Oliver and other western liberal members of parliament.

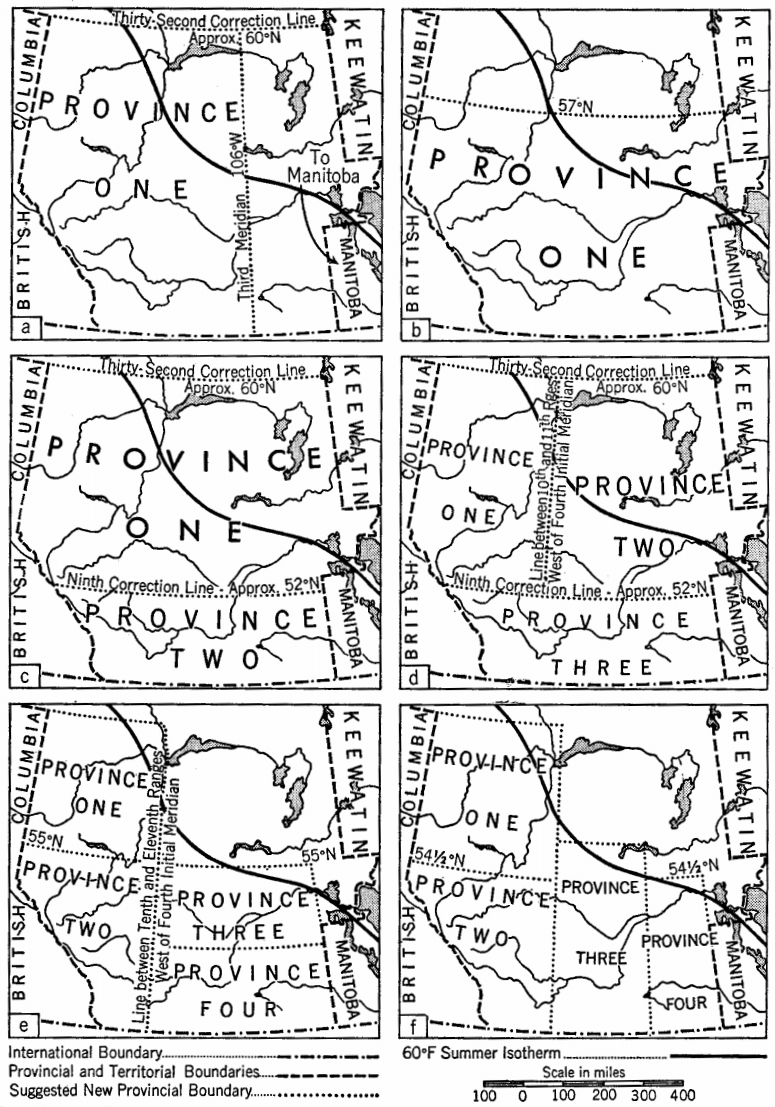
Maps showing proposals the federal government considered when dividing the North-West Territories into provinces.

The issue of provincehood was at the forefront of the 1902 North-West Territories general election, and historian Lingard noted that all candidates ran a campaign arguing for provincehood. The Territories were under growing financial stress from limited revenue generation authorities while there was wave of immigration and population growth and rising demands for improved government infrastructure and services. Haultain's government was reelected in the chaotic and partisan 1902 election. Despite the partisan divisions, members of the Territorial Assembly agreed that provincial autonomy was a pressing concern. During this time, Robert Borden, leader of the federal Conservative Party began to support provincehood for the Territories. Frustrated in negotiations with the federal Liberal government, Haultain identified with the Conservative Party and campaigned for it in the 1904 federal election.

Despite Haultain's influence, Laurier's Liberals were re-elected to power and even captured most of the vote in the North-West Territories. During the 1904 federal election, Laurier promised that his government would address the issue of provincial status. Despite efforts by Frank Oliver to downplay the benefits of autonomy in his newspaper, the Edmonton Bulletin, the Liberal government's Speech from the Throne to start the 10th Canadian Parliament committed the government to act on the question of autonomy. The government passed the Autonomy Act, which split the southern part of the North-West Territories along the 4th meridian of the Dominion Land Survey and created two provinces of roughly equal area of 275,000 square miles (710,000 km^{2}) and 250,000 people each. The federal government under Laurier said one single province covering the western prairies would be too large to manage effectively, and the territory above the 60th parallel north was unfit for agriculture and therefore had little hope of "thick and permanent settlement" so was not needing provincehood.

=== Terms of provincehood ===
The federal government drafted a bill for consultation that established two new provinces, retained federal ownership of public lands and resources, and provided financial terms that historian Lewis Thomas described as "not ungenerous".

The greatest opposition to the bill came with clauses providing education rights to minority faiths through separate schools, with the right enshrined to establish schools and be provided public funds. The Laurier government had been embroiled in a similar controversial schools question in Manitoba a decade earlier, which resulted in the Laurier-Greenway compromise and the removal of minority school rights in Manitoba. The compromise was opposed by French-Canadians and the Catholic Church. The Haultain government had been engaged in a progressive reduction of the minority faith education privileges, with only eleven separate schools in operation by 1905. Minister of the Interior and the western Liberal representative in Cabinet Clifford Sifton, who had been travelling away from Ottawa during the drafting of the autonomy bill returned to Ottawa to resign his portfolio in protest. Finance Minister William Stevens Fielding also considered resigning, but remained in cabinet.

The education matter was controversial in English Canada, eliciting responses from Liberal newspapers and stoking fears for Liberal unity, however, in the Territories the issue was not seen as significant. Instead, the main issue with provincehood in the North-West Territories was the debate over the location of the new provincial capital and whether the federal government or the new provinces would have ownership of public lands and resources. The autonomy bill was amended to provide minority faiths with the right to separate schools that remained under provincial control. The bill retained federal control over public lands and natural resources, and the provinces were promised $375,000 annually each with a provision for population growth.

The selection of the new provincial capital became the primary public issue. The finalized Alberta Act identified Edmonton as the "provisional" capital, and provided the legislative assembly the authority to determine the final location of the capital. Calgary had a slightly larger population and was located in a more densely populated part of the province, giving it an advantage. However, Edmonton's position as the geographic center of the province and Frank Oliver's prominent voice in Laurier's cabinet were also factors in its favor. Additionally, Member of Parliament for Strathcona Peter Talbot promised to "fight to the finish" to ensure the provisional capital was either in Edmonton or the neighbouring Strathcona.

The Alberta Act established electoral districts for the province's first election. The final layout favoured northern Alberta (north of Red Deer) with one more member than Red Deer and the area south, despite awareness that there had been 1,000 more votes cast in southern Alberta than north of Red Deer, in the 1904 federal election. Calgary Liberal Charles Stuart argued that a non-partisan commission would be best suited to establish the boundaries, but he did not push for the creation of a commission when it became clear that the federal Liberals would not implement one. Despite opposition from both Calgary Conservatives and Liberals, Oliver and Talbot supported the electoral boundaries favouring northern Alberta, ultimately convincing Laurier to keep the draft boundaries in place.

=== Appointing a Lieutenant Governor and Premier ===
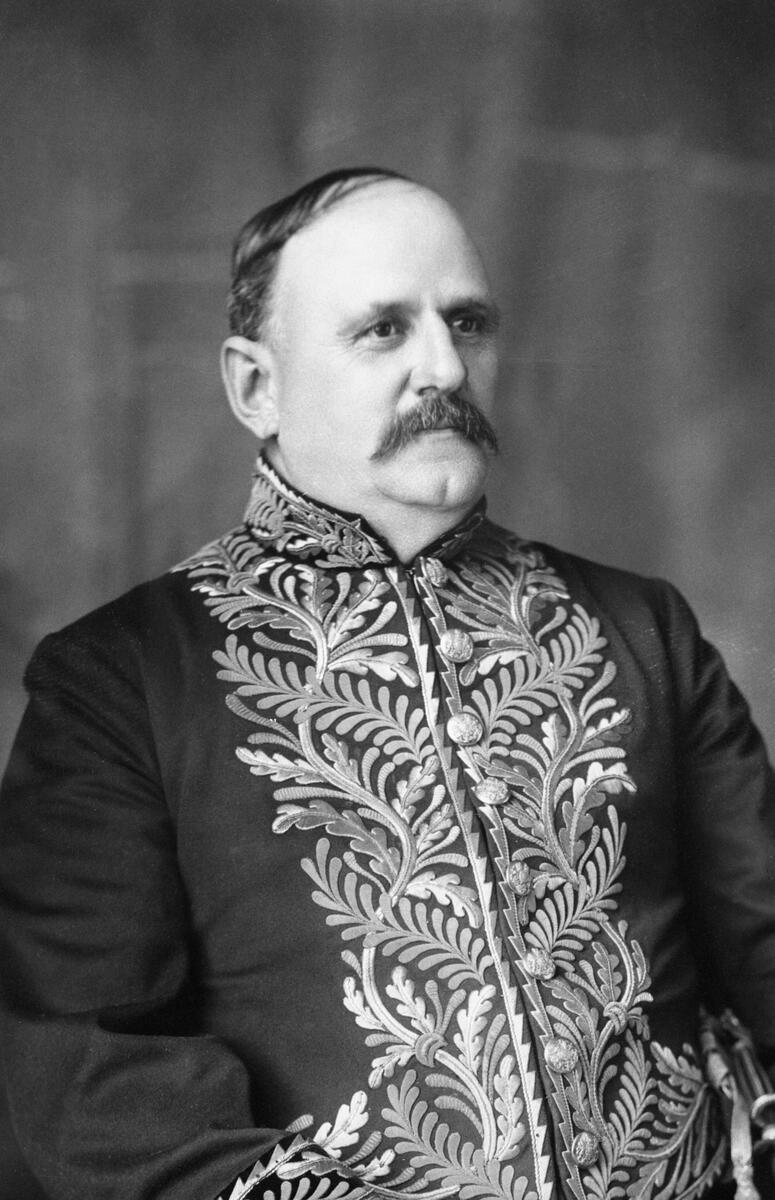
George Hedley Vicars Bulyea was appointed Alberta's first Lieutenant Governor.

The first election for the new provinces was scheduled to take place in November 1905, two months after Alberta and Saskatchewan entered Confederation. Since an elected government was not yet in place, an interim government had to be appointed to handle the affairs of the new provinces. Amédée E. Forget the Lieutenant Governor of the North-West Territories was appointed as the first Lieutenant Governor of Saskatchewan, while George H. V. Bulyea, a staunch Liberal and former member of the Territorial Legislature, was appointed as the first Lieutenant Governor of Alberta.

The selection process for the first premier of Alberta was contentious. While Frank Oliver was considered for the position, he said he preferred to remain in his role as Minister of the Interior in Laurier's cabinet, which he would lose in 1911 as it happened. Another contender was Peter Talbot, who was well regarded by Laurier and other members of the Liberal Party. However, Talbot believed that he did not have the financial means to engage in electoral politics and instead sought a position in the Senate, which he was granted in 1906. (This occasioned a by-election in the Strathcona riding and the election of Wilbert McIntyre.) Historian Lewis Thomas wrote that if Talbot had shown interest in becoming Alberta's first premier, Laurier would have appointed him to the position.

The next candidate was Alexander Cameron Rutherford, the member of the North-West Territories Assembly for the NWT Assembly district of Strathcona.

Laurier did not disclose his opinion on the decision. Finally, Rutherford was named the leader of the Alberta Liberal Party on August 13, 1905.

A few days later, Haultain announced that he would remain in Saskatchewan to form a provincial rights party. R. B. Bennett, a young Calgary lawyer was chosen as the leader of the Alberta Conservative Party a few days later on August 16, 1905. According to historian Lewis Thomas, Laurier's silence on the naming of a Premier weakened Haultain's position as the heir apparent in Alberta. If Laurier had named Rutherford earlier, Haultain and his supporters of non-partisan government could have mounted a stronger protest and campaign. Laurier's appointment of staunch Liberals in Bulyea, Forget, Rutherford and Walter Scott ushered in party politics to the new prairie provinces.

On September 2, 1905, Bulyea in his first official act as Lieutenant Governor swore Rutherford in as Alberta's first premier, and the Liberal party formed Alberta's first provincial government.

== Issues ==
=== Capital city ===
Section 9 of the Alberta Act stated that the seat of government would be established in Edmonton, but provided authority to the Lieutenant Governor of Alberta to move the capital. In essence, Edmonton was designated as a temporary capital until the elected provincial government could make a final decision.

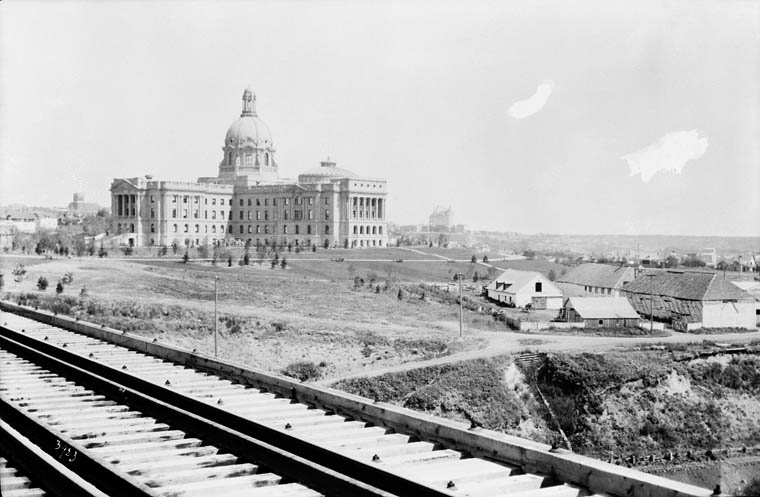
The Alberta Legislature Building as seen in 1914, was constructed after Edmonton was chosen as the capital of Alberta.

The competition between Calgary and Edmonton for the provincial capital was intense. During events in Edmonton, Liberal Attorney General Charles Wilson Cross assured the crowds that Edmonton would remain the capital. This position was endorsed by Conservative candidate William Antrobus Griesbach who declared that all thirteen northern Conservative candidates supported Edmonton as the capital.

At the same time, Conservative leader Bennett promised crowds in Calgary that if elected, his Conservative government would establish the capital in Calgary. His Liberal opponent and Minister of Public Works William Henry Cushing also pledged to bring the capital to Calgary, earning him the endorsement of the Calgary Albertan published by William McCartney Davidson. However, the Calgary Herald opposed Cushing and accused the federal Liberals of being intent on "the destruction of that commercial and industrial supremacy" of Calgary. The Herald also claimed that the federal Liberal party controlled the provincial Liberals.

Meanwhile, residents of Red Deer, situated about halfway between Calgary and Edmonton, tried to position their community as a compromise capital. However, due to the town's small size and lack of interest from federal officials, Red Deer was not considered a serious contender.

After the election resulted in an overwhelming Liberal majority, Premier Rutherford announced the location of the capital city was to be chosen by an open vote of the Legislature. Calgary's newspapers and its Board of Trade, recognizing the uphill battle of their city to be named capital, made little effort to rally Calgarians and southern Albertans to push for Calgary as capital.

Red Deer's MLA, John Thomas Moore, who had been said to be the man "most likely to secure the capital", was ineffective. After the election he had been absent from the province on personal business.

On April 25, 1906, Cushing made a motion in the Legislature to move the capital to Calgary, and Moore made a motion to move the capital to Red Deer. Edmonton was put forward as third option. When a vote was held to decide the issue of the capital, eight members voted for Calgary and 16 members voted for Edmonton. The choice of Edmonton was supported by three Liberal MLAs of southern Alberta - Simpson (Innisfail), Marcellus (Pincher Creek) and Finlay (Medicine Hat). The two Conservative MLAs - Robertson and Hiebert, plus six Liberal MLAs of southern Alberta - Moore, Cushing, Woolf, Simmons, Mackenzie and Stuart, voted for Calgary.

=== Education ===
After bitter debate across Canada, the proposed Alberta Act was amended by Laurier in second reading on March 22 and was passed by the 10th Canadian Parliament with provisions providing minority faiths with the right to separate schools under provincial control. Alberta conservatives railed against the education provisions, but the party and leadership did not make the repeal of the provisions an issue in the campaign. Alberta Liberals accepted the decisions of parliament in regards to the schools issue, and focused on "an efficient system of public schools".

== Campaign ==
The writ for the election was issued on October 19, 1905, with the election scheduled to take place three weeks later on November 9. In the Athabasca constituency, Liberal William Bredin was the only candidate to run and was therefore acclaimed, meaning there was no need for an electoral contest.

=== Liberal ===
Rutherford began his term as the appointed Premier by forming a cabinet inclusive of all the major regions of the province. The cabinet included Charles Wilson Cross of Medicine Hat as appointed Attorney General, William Henry Cushing of Calgary as Minister of Public Works, William Finlay of Edmonton as Minister of Agriculture, and Leverett George DeVeber of Lethbridge as Minister without a portfolio.

In October 1905, the Liberal party adopted its platform at a convention in Calgary. Recognizing the party was chosen to form government prior to the election, and the friendly relations with the Liberal federal government, the Liberal platform skirted both mild and controversial issues. The party did not address the separate schools or public lands issues, and instead emphasized adherence to "the principle of Provincial rights" as their policy. The Liberals supported a system of public schools financed through taxation and regulated by the provincial government. The Liberals responded to conservative calls for public ownership of utilities by recognizing that public ownership was desirable and should be considered. The platform also advocated for the agricultural industry and was opposed to the province incurring debt.

The Liberal Party received support from the Calgary Albertan newspaper, as well as Oliver's Edmonton Bulletin.

=== Conservative ===
With the exodus of Haultain to Saskatchewan, the Conservative movement was in desperate need of a new charismatic leader to face the incumbent Liberal party. Conservatives were able to find this leader in the young Calgary lawyer R. B. Bennett. The province was politically divided on geographic grounds, with Edmonton and northern Alberta leaning towards the Liberal Party, and Calgary and southern Alberta leaning more conservative. Calgary and southern Alberta's conservative-leaning was linked to the presence of the Canadian Pacific Railway which was generally regarded as exercising influence on behalf of the conservative movement.

The Conservative platform centered on protesting the federal government's decision to retain public lands and resources, advocating for government-owned utilities such as telephone lines, and promoting government construction and maintenance of roads and bridges. Although Griesbach and other Edmonton conservatives demanded Edmonton be named as the provincial capital, the Conservative party took no official position on the location of the capital. The party did not take an official stance on the issue of separate schools for minority faiths being included in the Alberta Act, owing to the influence of Bennett and Senator James Lougheed. However, Bennett made a speech criticizing the federal government for including the separate school provisions in the Alberta Act, describing it as an attack on provincial rights. Historian Lewis Thomas describes the Conservative platform as being "defensive", lacking the initiative of the Liberal platform, and seeming almost non-partisan in nature.

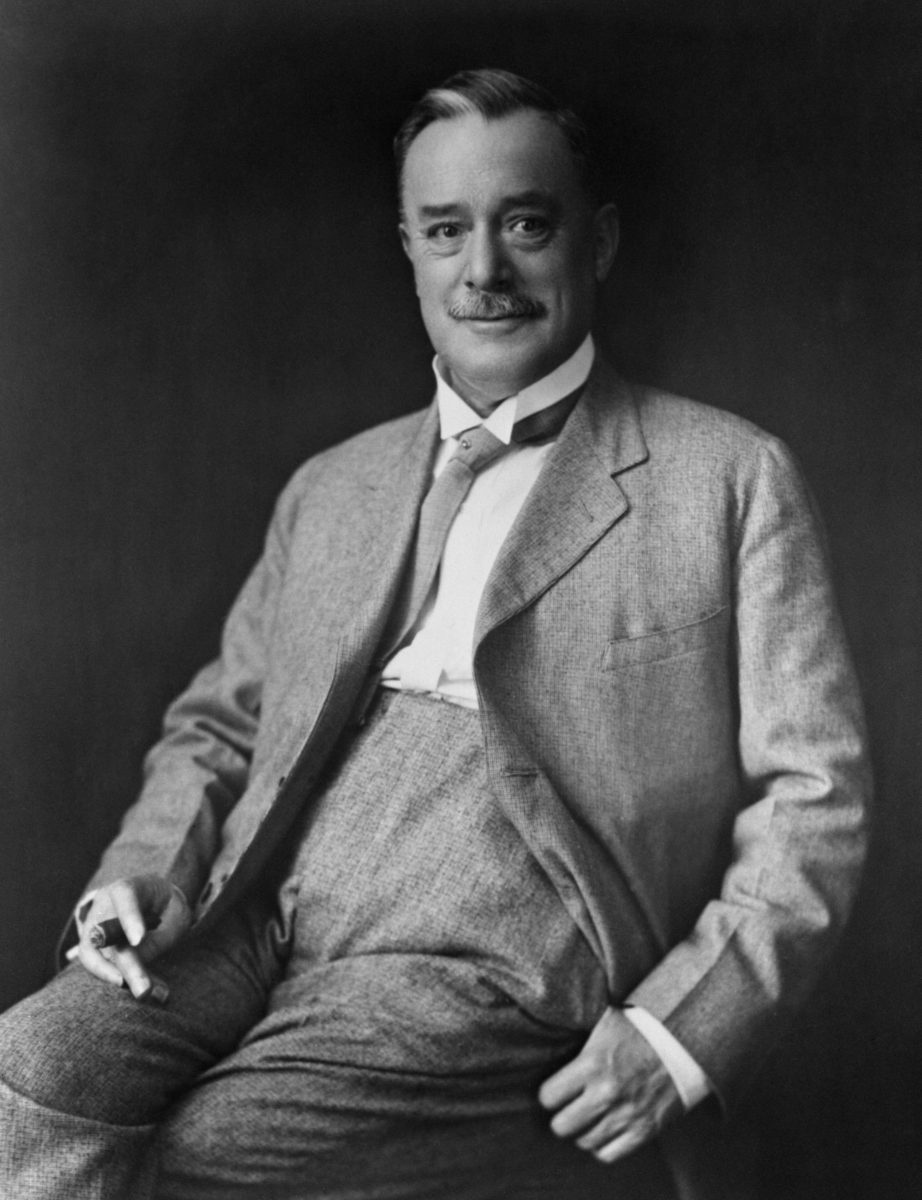
Calgary Eye-Opener publisher Bob Edwards, despite his previous criticism of the conservative leader, endorsed R. B. Bennett.

During the campaign, the personality and character of Conservative leader Bennett became one of the central issues. The Liberal-leaning newspaper Edmonton Bulletin pointed out Bennett's employment as a solicitor for the Canadian Pacific Railway, Bell Telephone Company and Calgary Water Power Company. His employment was used to illustrate a "corporation connection" with Bennett and the Conservative party. Similar concerns were raised by the conservative-leaning Calgary Herald prior to Bennett's confirmation as leader. Historian Lewis Thomas notes that the Liberal strategy to connect Bennett to the Canadian Pacific Railway was successful, as many Albertans resented the corporation for various reasons. Bennett did receive a surprising endorsement from Bob Edwards the publisher of the Calgary Eye-Opener, who had previously published stories critical of Bennett personally, and the Canadian Pacific Railway. Despite endorsing Bennett, Edwards contended that Bennett was a poor leader who sought "non-entities and spineless nincompoops as followers".

During the campaign, the Edmonton Bulletin ran several stories alleging corruption in the Conservative Party. This included a story accusing Calgary Conservative organizer William L. Walsh of attempting to bribe Daniel Maloney to run as a candidate in the St. Albert constituency.

== Election ==
=== Electoral boundaries ===
The boundaries of the electoral districts for the first Alberta general election were prescribed in the Alberta Act (Canada) and were a source of controversy with accusations of gerrymandering in favour of the Liberal Party and northern Alberta. Northern Alberta is thought by some to be over-represented. (Note: During the debates in Parliament, it was generally agreed that the dividing line of northern and southern Alberta was township 38 of the Alberta Township System. Township 38 includes the City of Red Deer, Alberta.) Calgary-based newspapers the Calgary Herald, Calgary Albertan, and Eye-Opener made claims that the districting constituted preferential treatment for Edmonton and northern Alberta. Alberta Members of Parliament Talbot and Oliver had assured Prime Minister Laurier that the districting was fair, but when word of Calgary's opposition reached Ottawa, Laurier summoned Talbot to explain the situation. On May 19, 1905, Talbot spent hours convincing Laurier that the distribution was fair. Laurier agreed but remained cautious and asked that the boundaries be submitted to a commission of judges for review. Laurier called a second meeting with Talbot on May 28 after receiving correspondence from Calgary Liberals but was once again put at ease by Talbot's explanation, and the concept of the judicial commission for review was never acted on.

Conservative Member of Parliament for Calgary Maitland Stewart McCarthy made no effort to advance Calgary and southern Alberta's claims for fair representation until June 20, 1905, much too late to make a difference. In the two-hour speech, McCarthy called for 15 seats in southern Alberta and 10 in northern Alberta and demanded a judicial commission to oversee the boundaries. However, McCarthy made no effort to participate in the early drafting process of the Alberta Act, instead hoping for an invitation to participate, one which never came from Oliver, the brunt of his efforts came too late in the drafting process.

The question of whether there was population-based gerrymandering returns different responses. Historian Lewis Thomas notes the final layout favoured northern Alberta with one additional district, despite Oliver and Talbot being aware that more than 1,000 more voters south of the Red Deer River participated in the 1904 Territorial election. Alexander Bruce Kilpatrick notes that the census results from 1906 show that if the 38th township is chosen as the dividing line (City of Red Deer), there were 93,601 persons in northern Alberta and 87,381 in southern Alberta, with an additional 4,430 residing in the 38th township. Kilpatrick claimed that people misconstrued where the population of the Strathcona census district lived, assuming that most were south of the 38th Township when in fact a large majority lived north of the township.

Kilpatrick however, described the layout of the electoral districts as a "blatant manipulation of the electoral map to suit a particular purpose". In particular, Kilpatrick claimed that Oliver designed the constituencies to maximize the influence of Edmonton. The borders did not align with the previous districts used for the North-West Territories legislature and instead were drawn to have several ridings touching Edmonton. At the same time, Calgary did not have the same advantages in design and was reduced from two seats in the North-West Territories Legislature to one in the new Alberta Legislature. (Calgary was given another member before the next provincial election, when the total members were increased by 16.)

=== Voting and eligibility ===
Voter and candidate eligibility requirements for the 1905 election remained the same as those set by the North-West Legislative Assembly under The Territories Elections Ordinance. The right to vote was provided to male British subjects who were 21 years of age or older, had resided in the North-West Territories for at least 12 months, and resided in the electoral district for the three months prior to election day. The election took place on November 9, 1905, and polls were open to voters between 9:00 a.m. and 5:00 p.m.

During the 1905 elections voters marked an "X" on a blank sheet of paper using a colored pencil that corresponded to the Liberal candidate (red) or Conservative candidate (blue) they wished to vote for. If a scrutineer disputed a voter's eligibility, the individual was required to complete a form providing their information and place it in an envelope with their ballot. The voter was then required to return within two days to contest the objection before a Justice of the Peace.

=== Irregularities ===
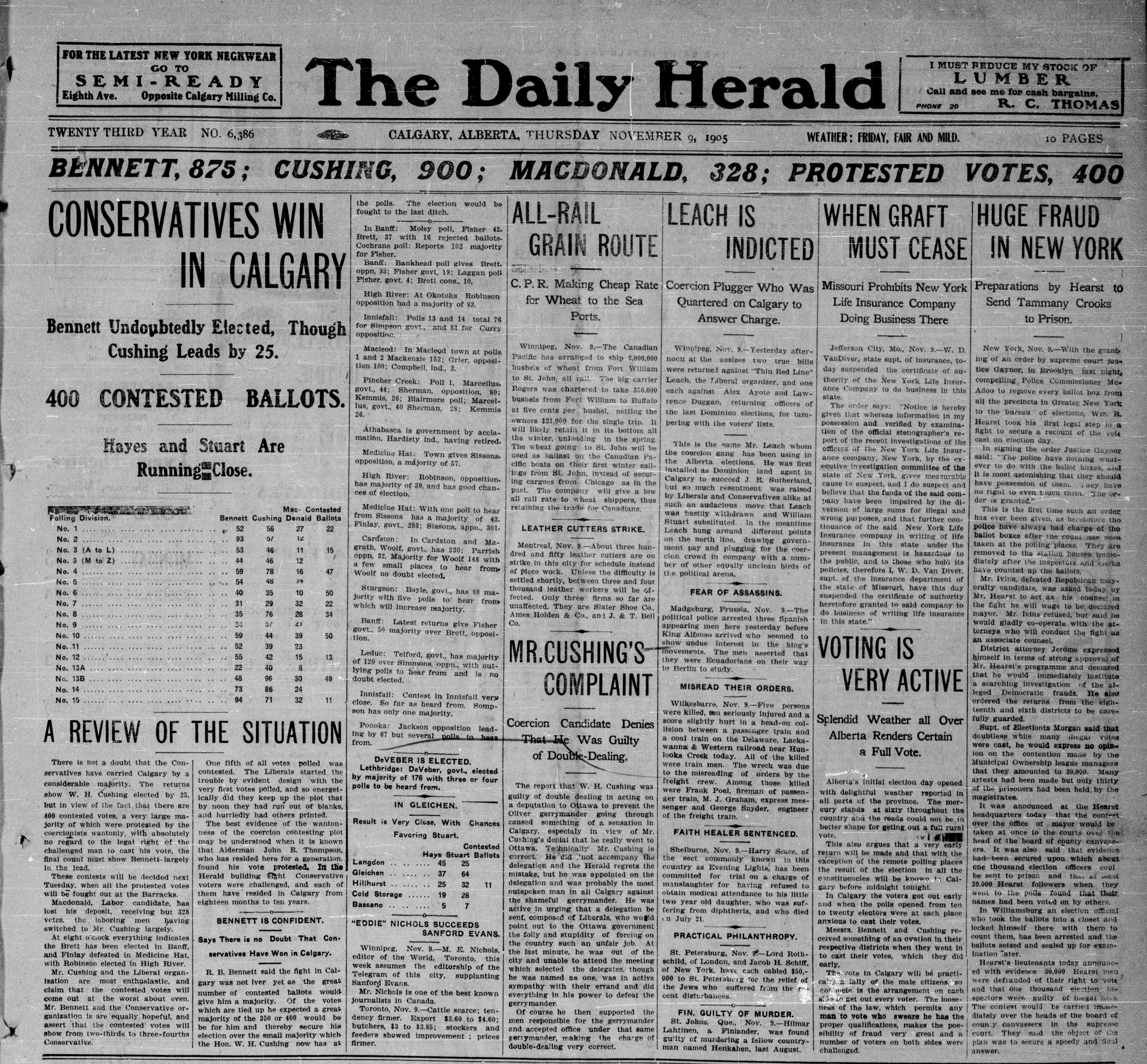
Front page of the Calgary Daily Herald on November 9, 1905, declaring R. B. Bennett the elected in Calgary.

==== Calgary ====
The 1905 election was marked by bitterness, particularly in Calgary and Southern Alberta, where Liberals were accused of vote tampering and interfering with Conservative voters. Recounts in Calgary took almost a month, and the results swung back and forth between candidates. The scandal led to the arrest of key Liberal organizers, including William Henry Cushing's campaign manager, who had been a returning officer at a Calgary polling station. A liberal organizer was convicted of bribery for paying a voter $10 not to defend his ballot when it was challenged during the count. Eventually, the Calgary contest was declared in favor of Cushing, who won with a margin of only 37 votes.

==== Peace River ====
The Peace River electoral district was contested between Liberal James Cornwall and Independent Lucien Dubuc. Dubec received the greater number of votes, but Rutherford's Cabinet overturned the election results in mid-January due to significant irregularities, leaving the seat vacant. A new election was held on February 15, 1906. An appeal was launched into the legality of Cabinet deciding on the legitimacy of an election, which was upheld when Judge David Lynch Scott found the court had no jurisdiction to consider the case unless delegated by the legislature.

In the new election, Thomas Brick declared his candidacy for the Liberals after being urged to run by a large group of people who came to his homestead. He faced James Cornwall who attempted to regain his seat and also ran under the Liberal banner. Lucien Dubuc, the conservative runner-up candidate from the original 1905 election, did not run again, resulting in a rare two-way race under the same party banner. Thomas Brick was elected in a landslide against James Cornwall.

District	Member	Party
Election night
Peace River	James Cornwall	Liberal
February 15, 1906
Peace River	Thomas Brick	Liberal

== Aftermath ==
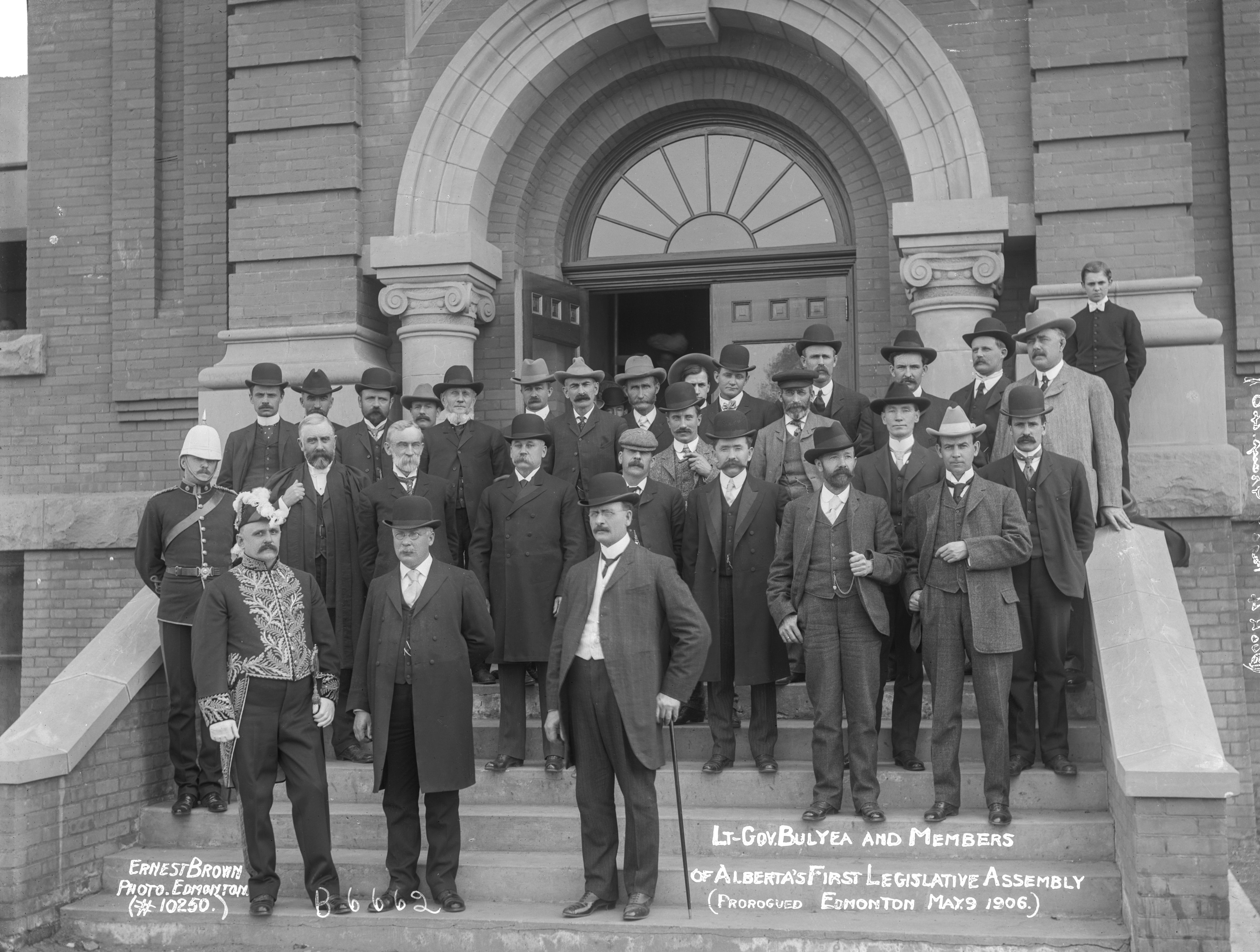
Members of the first Legislative Assembly of Alberta, taken in 1906.

In the election, Premier Rutherford's Liberal Party dominated, winning 23 of the 25 available seats in a landslide victory. Bennett's Conservative Party captured only two seats, and Bennett himself was unsuccessful in Calgary. The Liberals were confident that they would form a majority government prior to the election, but had not expected so many seats. Liberal member of parliament Talbot estimated that the party would on win 18 seats. The Conservatives, on the other hand, did not expect the defeat, having successfully nominated candidates in 22 of the 25 ridings and having entrenched support in southern Alberta. The Conservatives attributed their defeat to the Roman Catholic vote, which was believed to be sympathetic to Laurier for his support of separate schools. Bennett himself attributed his loss in Calgary to Roman Catholic influences, the labour vote, and his time travelling outside of the district. Bennett quickly resigned from his position as Conservative leader and temporarily retired from politics. Some Conservatives also attributed the loss to non-Anglo-Saxon voters, but the victories of Cornelius Hiebert in Rosebud and Albert Robertson in High River went against this trend. Hiebert, a Russian-born Mennonite, won in his constituency, while Robertson was aided by a third candidate siphoning votes from the incumbent Liberal opponent.

Historian Lewis Thomas argues the Liberal landslide was due to the incumbent position of the Liberal government, which in its two months had not been tested with scandal or policy, making it difficult for effective opposition and criticism. Meanwhile, the Liberals were able to maintain all the powers of patronage that an incumbent would have. Thomas notes that the Liberals effectively exercised the machinery of government at both the provincial and federal levels, with Thomas noting a few letters between liberals suggesting appointments. Furthermore, Thomas argues that the strong positions taken by the Conservative Party on the provincial right to control the school system and public lands did not make a significant impression on voters.

One of the concrete benefits of being the government in waiting in advance of the election was control of the appointment of returning officers. In Innisfail district, this meant an additional seat when the vote count resulted in a tie.

== Results ==
Party	Votes		Seats
Liberal	14,078	57.6%	23 / 25 (92%)
Conservative	9,342	37.1%	2 / 25 (8%)
Others and independents	1,743	5.3%	0 / 25 (0%)

=== Full results ===
and the 1906 by-election in Peace River

Summary of the 1905 Alberta general election
Party	Party leader	Candidates	Seats		Popular vote	
Party	Party leader	Candidates	1905	% seats	Votes	%
Liberal	Alexander Cameron Rutherford	27 (Note: Two Liberal candidates contested the St. Albert district. Two Liberal candidates contested the Peace River district after the result of the first election was voided.)	23	92%	14,485	57.56%
Conservative	R. B. Bennett	22 (Note: The Conservatives did not nominate candidates in three ridings. They did nominate a candidate originally for Peace River, but the result was set aside and no Conservative stood for the second election in Peace River.)	2	8%	9,342	37.13%
Independent and no affiliation		7	0	0%	1,336	5.31%
Total		56	25	100%	25,163	100.00%

=== Members of the Legislative Assembly elected ===
For complete electoral history, see individual districts

(for the Peace River district results, see above)

Electoral District	Liberal	Conservative	Other
Athabasca	William Bredin; Acclaimed		
Banff	Charles W. Fisher; 421; 53.70%	Robert Brett; 363; 46.30%	
Calgary	William Cushing; 1,030; 42.39%	R. B. Bennett; 993; 40.86%	Alex D. Macdonald (Ind.); 407; 16.75%
Cardston	John William Woolf; 480; 69.57%	John F. Parish; 210; 30.43%	
Edmonton	Charles Wilson Cross; 1,209; 70.09%	William Antrobus Griesbach; 516; 29.91%	
Gleichen	Charles Stuart; 667; 51.03%	John W. Hayes; 640; 48.97%	
High River	Richard Alfred Wallace; 555; 42.21%	Albert Robertson; 578; 43.95%	Wilford B. Thorne (Ind.); 182; 13.84%
Innisfail*	John A. Simpson; 408; 50.06%	Sam J. Curry; 407; 49.94%	
Lacombe	William Puffer; 612; 52.8%	Andrew Gilmour; 547; 47.2%	
Leduc	Robert Telford; 481; 63.46%	C.E.A. Simons; 277; 36.54%	
Lethbridge	Leverett DeVeber; 639; 56.55%	William Carlos Ives; 491; 43.45%	
Macleod	Malcolm McKenzie; 584; 58.11%	David J. Grier; 368; 36.62%	Duncan J.D.K. Campbell (Ind.); 53; 5.27%
Medicine Hat	William Finlay; 575; 51.71%	Francis O. Sissions; 537; 48.29%	
Pincher Creek	John Plummer Marcellus; 550; 39.40%	Frank A. Sherman; 436; 31.23%	John H.W.S. Kemmis (Ind.); 410; 29.37%
Ponoka	John R. McLeod; 375; 58.59%	John A. Jackson; 265; 41.41%	
Red Deer	John T. Moore; 524; 48.03%	Leonard Gaetz; 479; 43.9%	Alexander D. McKenzie (Ind.); 88; 8.07%
Rosebud	Michael Clark; 545; 43.25%	Cornelius Hiebert; 589; 46.75%	Joseph Reid (Ind.); 126; 10.00%
St. Albert	Henry William McKenney; 407; 51.00%		
St. Albert	Lucien Boudreau; 391; 49.00%		
Stony Plain	John McPherson; 354; 57.94%	Dan Brox; 187; 30.61%	Conrad Weidenhammer (Ind.); 70; 11.46%
Strathcona	Alexander Cameron Rutherford; 625; 67.13%	Frank W. Crang; 306; 32.87%	
Sturgeon	John R. Boyle; 721; 76.78%	Frank Knight; 218; 23.22%	
Vermilion	Matthew McCauley; 673; 73.07%	Frank Fane; 248; 26.93%	
Victoria	Francis A. Walker; 949; 69.88%	John W. Shera; 409; 30.12%	
Wetaskiwin	Anthony Rosenroll; 552; 66.51%	Robert MacLachlan Angus; 278; 33.49%	

- When votes in Innisfail were counted, it was found that the two candidates were tied, 407 to 407. The returning officer, appointed by Rutherford, broke the tie by giving his vote to the Liberal candidate.

== See also ==
- List of Alberta political parties

== Works cited ==
- Office of the Chief Electoral Officer; Legislative Assembly Office (2006). A Century of Democracy: Elections of the Legislative Assembly of Alberta, 1905-2005. The Centennial Series. Edmonton, AB: Legislative Assembly of Alberta. ISBN 0-9689217-8-7.
- Babcock, Douglas R. (1989). A Gentleman of Strathcona: Alexander Cameron Rutherford. Calgary: The University of Calgary Press. ISBN 0-919813-65-8.
- Gray, James H. (1991). R.B. Bennett: The Calgary Years. Toronto: University of Toronto Press. ISBN 978-0-8020-5975-8.
- Hall, David (Winter 2005). "The Transition to Partisanship: Alberta Political Party Platforms, 1905". Canadian Issues: 21–23. ISSN 0318-8442. ProQuest 208684009.
- Hopkins, J. Castell (1906). The Canadian Annual Review of Public Affairs, 1905. Toronto: The Annual Review Publishing Company.
- Kilpatrick, Alexander Bruce (1980). "A Lesson in Boosterism: The Contest for the Alberta Provincial Capital, 1904-1906". Urban History Review. 8 (3): 47–109. doi:10.7202/1019362ar. ISSN 0703-0428.
- Lingard, C. Cecil (1978) [1946]. Territorial Government in Canada: The Autonomy Question in the Old North-West Territories. Toronto: University of Toronto Press. ISBN 978-0-8020-7095-1.
- Nicholson, Norman L. (1979). The boundaries of the Canadian confederation. Toronto: Macmillan of Canada. ISBN 978-0-7705-1742-7.
- Thomas, Lewis Gwynne (1959). The Liberal Party in Alberta. Toronto, Ontario: University of Toronto Press. ISBN 978-0-8020-5083-0.
- Thomas, Lewis H. (1978). The struggle for responsible government in the North-West Territories, 1870–97 (2nd ed.). Toronto: University of Toronto Press. ISBN 978-0-8020-2287-5.
