= James Cornwall =

Canadian politician

Lieutenant-Colonel James Cornwall DSO
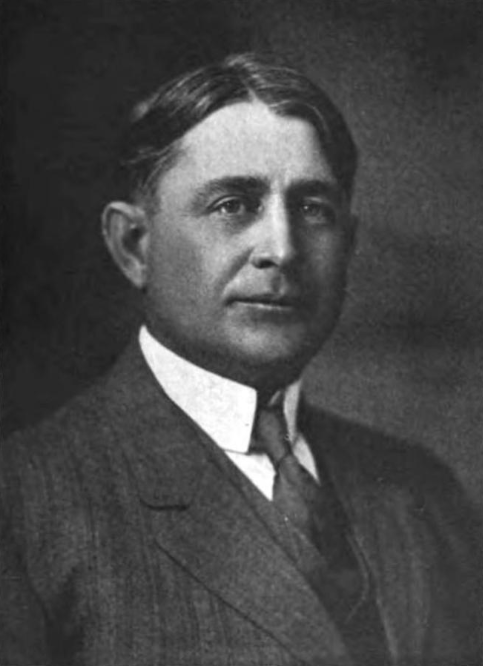

Member of the Legislative Assembly of Alberta
- In office June 30, 1909 – March 25, 1913
- Preceded by: Thomas Brick
- Succeeded by: Alphaeus Patterson
- Constituency: Peace River

Personal details
- Born: James Kennedy Cornwall; October 29, 1869 Brantford, Canada West
- Died: November 20, 1955 (aged 86)
- Party: Liberal
- Occupation: soldier, fur trader, politician

Lieutenant-Colonel James Kennedy "Peace River Jim" Cornwall DSO (October 29, 1869 – November 20, 1955) was a provincial politician from Alberta, Canada. He served as a member of the Legislative Assembly of Alberta from 1909 to 1913 sitting with the Liberal caucus in government.

== Business career ==
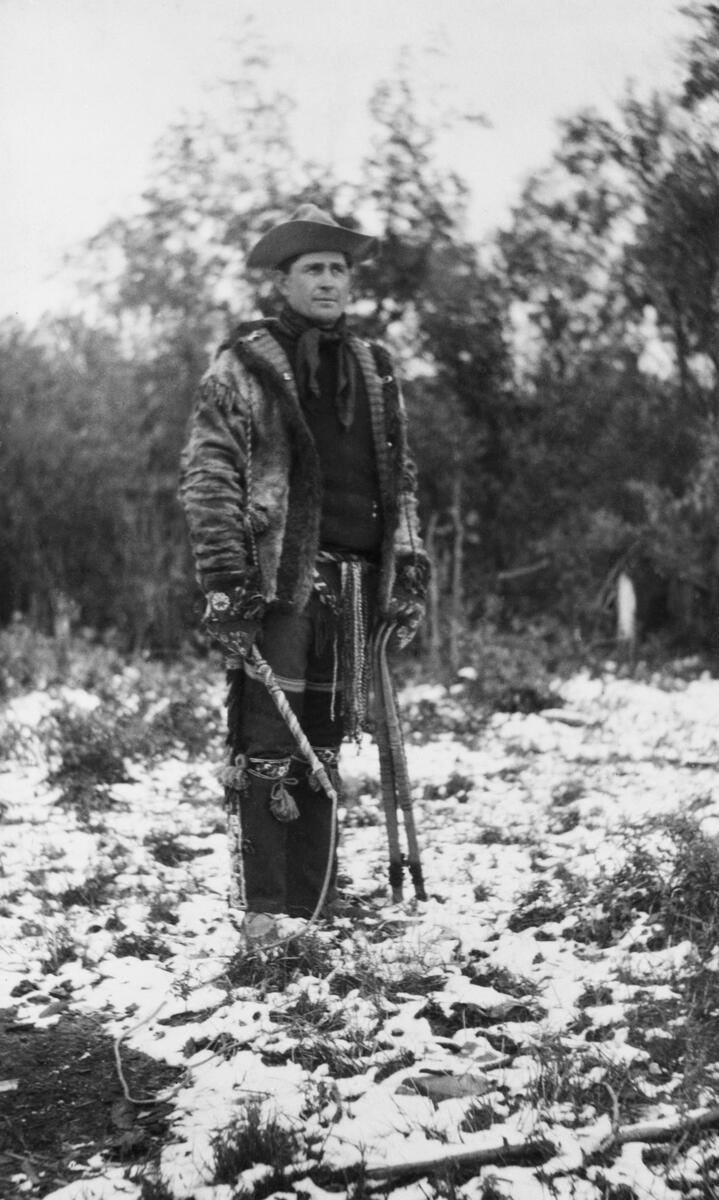
Prior to his political career Cornwall played a role in the early development of Northern Alberta

Cornwall was a founding member of the Northern Transportation Company which grew out of the Northern Traders Company. He served as the company's first President. The company operated fleets of steamboats and barge-towing tugboats on the Mackenzie River system.

== Political career ==
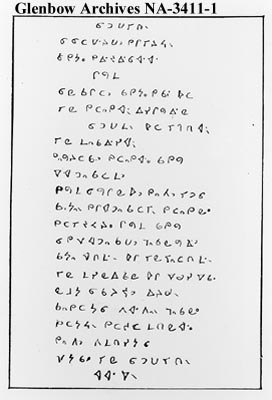
1905 poster for Cornwall in Cree syllabics.

Cornwall ran as a provincial Liberal candidate in the 1905 Alberta general election in the Peace River electoral district.

He faced independent candidate Lucien Dubuc but was defeated by an unknown number of votes despite being favoured to win. The election results were annulled by the Executive Council of Alberta as there were significant irregularities in the vote, and a new writ was ordered. Cornwall ran in the ensuing by-election held on February 16, 1906. This time he faced Independent Liberal candidate Thomas Brick, who easily defeated him.

Cornwall was returned to the Alberta Legislature by acclamation in the 1909 Alberta general election and held the seat for a single term, sitting with the Liberals.

Cornwall was sued while still a member in the Legislature. On May 13, 1910, he filed his defence in provincial court. Cornwall was named in a lawsuit by Toronto businessman Alfred Hawes, who was looking to recoup more than $250,000 lost in the Alberta and Great Waterways Railway Scandal. The same scandal caused the resignation of the entire Rutherford cabinet days later. Cornwall left the Liberal cabinet and sat as an Independent.

Cornwall served overseas with the Canadian Expeditionary Force in the First World War, including command of the 218th Battalion, CEF. While he was in Europe he ran in the 1917 Alberta general election non-partisan soldiers' and nurses' vote. He finished fourth in a large field of candidates. He was awarded the Distinguished Service Order in the 1918 New Year Honours.

After the war Cornwall ran in a by-election in the Athabasca district in a 1920 by-election as an independent. He was easily defeated by Alberta Liberal George Mills. He ran again less than a year later in the 1921 Alberta general election but was defeated, finishing in 16th place out of the 26 candidates.

The Social Credit government under William Aberhart tried to entice Cornwall to run for a seat under their banner for a by-election in Athabasca, which Cornwall declined.
