= Gary Friedel =

Canadian politician

MLA for Peace River
- In office June 15, 1993 – November 22, 2004
- Preceded by: Al Adair
- Succeeded by: Frank Oberle

Personal details
- Born: October 30, 1942 (age 83) Fairview, Alberta
- Party: Progressive Conservative Association of Alberta

Gary Friedel (born October 30, 1942) is a civil servant and former provincial level politician from Alberta, Canada. He served as a member of the Legislative Assembly of Alberta from 1993 until 2004.

== Political career ==
Friedel was elected to the Alberta Legislature in the 1993 Alberta general election. He won a close race defeating three other candidates to hold the vast northern district of Peace River for the Progressive Conservatives. He was re-elected to his second term in the 1997 Alberta general election where he won a rare two-way race over Liberal candidate Bruce MacKeen taking 61% of the popular vote. Friedel spent a year serving as chair of Select Special Freedom of Information and Protection of Privacy Act Review Committee. On March 18, 1999 he would table a report from the committee in the Legislature that made 81 recommendations to amend the Freedom of Information and Protection of Privacy Act.

Friedel would marginally improve his vote total running for a third term in a four-way race in the 2001 Alberta general election. In that election he would take 64% of the votes cast. In his final term as MLA he served as Chair of the Northern Alberta Developments Council. He would not run for public office again in 2004.

== Late life ==
After Friedel left his seat in the Legislature he became chairman of the Commuter Air Access Network of Alberta. As Past chairman he is fighting Edmonton city council to keep large passenger flights out of Edmonton City Centre Airport.

Legislative Assembly of Alberta
Preceded by Al Adair	MLA Peace River; 1993–2004	Succeeded by Frank Oberle
