= Thomas Brick =

Canadian politician

Thomas Allan "Allie" Brick

Member of the Legislative Assembly of Alberta
- In office February 15, 1906 – March 22, 1909
- Preceded by: Lucien Dubuc
- Succeeded by: James Cornwall
- Constituency: Peace River

Personal details
- Born: January 2, 1867 Compton, Quebec
- Died: April 25, 1938 (aged 71) Keg River, Alberta
- Party: Independent Liberal
- Parent: John Gough Brick (father)
- Occupation: farmer

Thomas Allan "Allie" Brick (January 2, 1867 – April 25, 1938) was a Canadian politician and farmer from Alberta.

== Early life ==
Thomas Allen Brick was born on January 2, 1867, in Compton, Quebec to Anglican missionary John Gough Brick and his wife Emma Marie Brick. Brick was educated in Toronto and married Nancy Jane Gray on May 18, 1895, and together had three children. Brick was a pioneer farmer who is largely credited with bringing grain farming to the northern Alberta.

His brother Fred Brick was an important pioneer and trader at Fort Vermilion in the 1890s.

== Political career ==
Brick ran for a seat to the Legislative Assembly of Alberta in a by-election held to dispense with the vacancy in the Peace River electoral district caused by the Executive Council of Alberta refusing to recognize the results from the 1905 Alberta general election.

The by-election was held on February 15, 1906. Brick ran as an Independent Liberal candidate defeating the Liberal candidate James Cornwall in a straight fight with a landslide majority. Brick was nominated by a large group of residents in the town of Peace River who chose him to be their representative in Edmonton.

Brick only served a single term in the Legislature, he was originally going to run for a second term in office but dropped out of the race before the nomination deadline.
