= Dan Williams (Canadian politician) =

Canadian politician (born 1986/87)

The Honourable Dan Williams ECA MLA
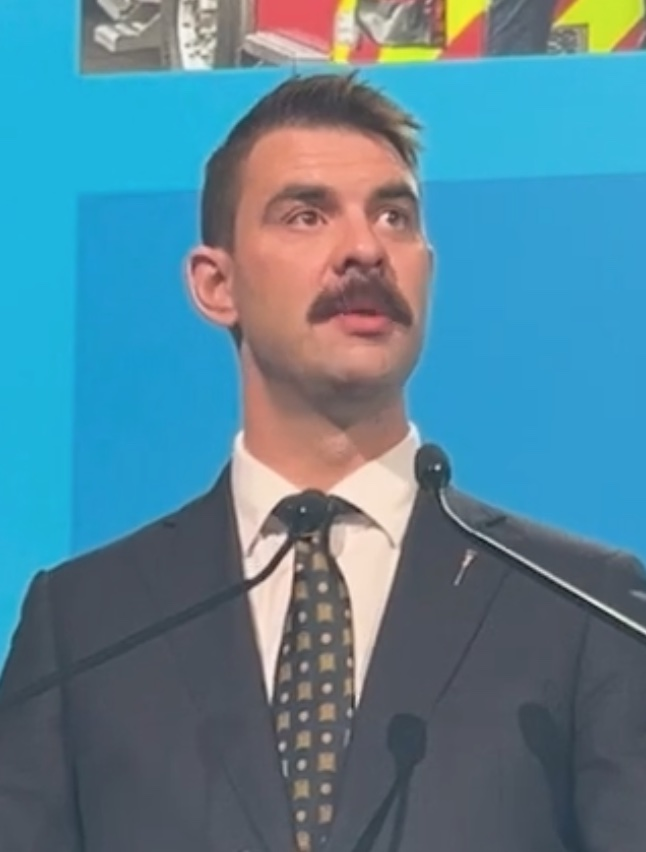

Minister of Municipal Affairs
- Incumbent
- Assumed office May 16, 2025
- Premier: Danielle Smith
- Preceded by: Ric McIver

Minister of Mental Health and Addiction
- In office June 9, 2023 – May 16, 2025
- Premier: Danielle Smith
- Preceded by: Nicholas Milliken
- Succeeded by: Rick Wilson

Member of the Legislative Assembly of Alberta for Peace River
- Incumbent
- Assumed office April 16, 2019
- Preceded by: Debbie Jabbour

Personal details
- Born: 1986 or 1987 (age 38–39)
- Party: United Conservative Party

Dan Williams ECA MLA (born 1986 or 1987) is a Canadian politician who has been the Minister of Municipal Affairs since 2025. He was elected in the 2019 Alberta general election to represent the electoral district of Peace River in the 30th Alberta Legislature. He was re-elected in the 2023 Alberta general election.

Williams was the Alberta Minister of Mental Health and Addiction from 2023 to 2025 and was shuffled to Minister of Municipal Affairs on May 16, 2025.

As of March 2023, Dan Williams was Deputy Government Whip as well as Chair of the Standing Committee on Private Bills. He also was the Deputy Chair of the Special Standing Committee on Members’ Services and was a member of the Building Communities Cabinet Policy Committee. He had previously been Parliamentary Secretary to the Minister of Culture and for la Francophonie, Deputy Chair of the Select Special Ombudsman and Public Interest Commissioner Search Committee as well as a member of the Standing Committee on Privileges and Elections, Standing Orders and Printing.

As of March 2023 Dan Williams had sponsored four bills as MLA. These being Bill 207; Conscience Rights (Health Care Providers) Protection Act, Bill 217; Polish-Canadian Heritage Day Act, Bill Pr1; The Sisters of the Precious Blood of Edmonton Repeal Act, and Bill 202; Alberta Personal Income Tax (Charitable and Other Gifts) Amendment Act.

He resides in La Crete with his wife, Maureen, where he worked at Knelsen Sand & Gravel.

In 2019 Williams said he supported immediately repealing the provincial carbon tax and reducing regulations to create the fastest regulatory approval process in North America. He also supported a one-third reduction in the corporate tax to promote economic growth. In January 2019, he appeared at a pro-resource rally where he stated, “We are not at all ashamed to defend (the oil and gas) industry, to defend the way we make a living and have for generations in this province.”

In 2019 he was in favour of reducing the rural crime rate through additional funding to the criminal justice system and strategic reforms to avoid suspected criminals escaping the justice system without a trial.

Williams supports school choice and is opposed to abortion.

On March 15, 2023, to show his support for the Royal Canadian Legion, Dan Williams drank a beer while the Alberta Legislature was in session as he was giving his remarks. As Speaker Nathan Cooper described, the action was in violation of parliamentary procedures.

== Electoral history ==
=== 2023 general election ===
2023 Alberta general election: Peace River
Party	Candidate	Votes	%	±%
United Conservative	Dan Williams	8,236	72.84	+3.44
New Democratic	Liana Paiva	2,587	22.88	+0.58
Independent	Conrad Nunweiler	290	2.56	–
Alberta Independence	Sharon Noullett	194	1.72	–
Total		11,307	99.49	–
Rejected and declined		58	0.51	
Turnout		11,365	45.51	
Eligible voters		24,974		
United Conservative hold		Swing		+1.43
Source(s) Source: Elections Alberta

=== 2019 general election ===
2019 Alberta general election: Peace River
Party	Candidate	Votes	%	±%
United Conservative	Dan Williams	9,770	69.40	+13.18
New Democratic	Debbie Jabbour	3,139	22.30	-18.01
Alberta Party	Dakota House	721	5.12	1.65
Freedom Conservative	Connie Russell	249	1.77	–
Liberal	Remi J. Tardif	198	1.41	–
Total		14,077	99.18	–
Rejected, spoiled and declined		117	0.82	
Turnout		14,194	60.51	
Eligible voters		23,458		
United Conservative gain from New Democratic		Swing		+15.59
Source(s) Source: "77 - Peace River, 2019 Alberta general election". officialresults.elections.ab.ca. Elections Alberta.
