= Dakota House =

Canadian actor, politician, writer and activist

- Born: February 14, 1974 (age 52); Manning, Alberta, Canada
- Occupations: Actor, politician, writer, activist
- Years active: 1993–present
- Known for: North of 60

Dakota House (born February 17, 1974) is a Canadian actor, politician, writer and activist. House is most noted for his role as Trevor "Teevee" Tenia in the television drama series North of 60, for which he was a Gemini Award nominee for Best Supporting Actor in a Drama Series at the 10th Gemini Awards in 1996.

== Career ==
House has continued to have occasional acting roles, including in the films Dreamkeeper and One Dead Indian, and guest appearances in the television series MythQuest, Heartland and Blackstone.

In 2019, House stood as a candidate in the 2019 Alberta general election, campaigning for the Alberta Party in the electoral district of Peace River. In 2020, he appeared in a public service announcement on behalf of Edmonton's Ben Calf Robe Society, promoting a suicide prevention hotline program targeted to First Nations.

== Personal life ==
During his time on North of 60, House struggled with alcohol abuse, and went through several brushes with the law including a charge of domestic violence against his wife in 1994, and an impaired driving arrest in 1995. In 1997, he was physically attacked by four men in his apartment building, suffering serious injuries including a skull fracture and the loss of part of his ear.

After giving up alcohol he launched Going Miles, a self-help and mentorship group for Indigenous youth. In 2002, he published Dancers in the Sky, a children's book based on traditional Cree story about the origins of the aurora borealis. House has 6 children; one of his sons, Dredon House, is a designer.

== Filmography ==
=== Film ===
Year	Title	Role	Notes
1999	The Arrangement	Dog Collar	
1999	The Creator's Game	Daniel Cloud	
1999	Legend of Two-Path	Skyco	
2006	Dream Makers	—N/a	Documentary
2021	The Demented	Senica	Associate producer
TBA	Tales from the Dead Zone	Vernon Steamboat	Post-production
TBA	Starlight	Thomas	Post-production
TBA	The Epidemic	Gary	Filming
TBA	Valetika	Royal	Pre-production

=== Television ===
Year	Title	Role	Notes
1992–1997	North of 60	Trevor "Teevee" Tenia	81 episode
1993	The Diviners	Jules (14 years old)	Television film
1995	Medicine River	Elwood	Television film
1995	The X-Files	Eric Hosteen	2 episodes
1999	In the Blue Ground	Trevor 'Teevee' Tenia	Television film
2000	Trial by Fire	Trevor 'Teevee' Tenia	Television film
2001	MythQuest	Tlesca	Episode: "Red Wolf's Daughter"
2001	Dream Storm	Trevor 'Teevee' Tenia	Television film
2003	Another Country	Trevor 'Teevee' Tenia	Television film
2003	Dreamkeeper	Dirty Belly	Television film
2005	Distant Drumming: A North of 60 Mystery	Trevor 'Teevee' Tenia	Television film
2005	Trudeau II: Maverick in the Making	Guide (NWT)	Television film
2006	One Dead Indian	Dudley George	Television film
2009	Dear Prudence	JR Vigil	Television film
2011	Heartland	Colby	Episode: "Family Business"
2012	The Horses of McBride	Adam	Television film
2013	Blackstone	Ned	Episode: "Some Things Never Change"

== Electoral record ==
2019 Alberta general election: Peace River
Party	Candidate	Votes	%	±%
United Conservative	Dan Williams	9,770	69.40	+13.18
New Democratic	Debbie Jabbour	3,139	22.30	-18.01
Alberta Party	Dakota House	721	5.12	1.65
Freedom Conservative	Connie Russell	249	1.77	–
Liberal	Remi J. Tardif	198	1.41	–
Total		14,077	99.18	–
Rejected, spoiled and declined		117	0.82	
Turnout		14,194	60.51	
Eligible voters		23,458		
United Conservative gain from New Democratic		Swing		+15.59
Source(s) Source: "77 - Peace River, 2019 Alberta general election". officialresults.elections.ab.ca. Elections Alberta.
