= Robert Wiebe =

Canadian politician

Robert Henry Wiebe

Member of the Legislative Assembly of Alberta
- In office May 23, 1967 – August 30, 1971
- Preceded by: Euell Montgomery
- Succeeded by: Al Adair
- Constituency: Peace River

Personal details
- Born: February 3, 1937 (age 89) Rycroft, Alberta
- Party: Social Credit
- Occupation: politician

Robert Henry Wiebe (born February 3, 1937) was a municipal and provincial politician from Alberta, Canada. He served as a member of the Legislative Assembly of Alberta from 1967 to 1971 sitting with the governing Social Credit caucus.

== Political career ==
Wiebe began his political career as the mayor of Grimshaw, Alberta. He ran for a seat to the Alberta Legislature in the 1967 Alberta general election while still the mayor. Wiebe ran as the Social Credit candidate in the provincial electoral district of Peace River against two other candidates, including the former mayor of Peace River, Edward Whitney, who ran as an Independent. Wiebe won the district with over half the popular vote to hold the seat for Social Credit.

Wiebe ran for a second term in office in the 1971 Alberta general election. He would be defeated by Progressive Conservative candidate Al Adair in a hotly contested race.
