= Al Adair =

Canadian politician

Al "Boomer" Adair

Member of the Legislative Assembly of Alberta for Peace River
- In office August 30, 1971 – June 15, 1993
- Preceded by: Robert Wiebe
- Succeeded by: Gary Friedel

Personal details
- Born: May 13, 1929 Edmonton, Alberta, Canada
- Died: December 24, 1996 (aged 67) Peace River, Alberta, Canada
- Party: Progressive Conservative Association of Alberta

James Allen "Al" "Boomer" Adair (May 13, 1929 – December 24, 1996) was a minor league baseball player, radio broadcaster and politician from Alberta, Canada. He served in the Legislative Assembly of Alberta from 1971 to 1993.

== Early life ==
Adair played minor league baseball for the Peace River Stampeders in the North Peace Baseball League in the 1960s. After baseball he was a well known radio broadcaster in Peace River until he ran for political office in 1971.

== Political career ==
Adair first ran for the Alberta legislature in the 1971 general election. Running as a candidate for the Progressive Conservative Party, he defeated incumbent Social Credit MLA Robert Wiebe in the electoral district of Peace River. He was appointed to the cabinet by Premier Peter Lougheed and served as the minister without portfolio responsible for native affairs. Adair was re-elected in the 1975 general election over three other candidates. After the election, Lougheed appointed him Minister of Recreation, Parks and Wildlife.

In the 1979 Alberta general election, Adair easily defeated three other candidates to win the second highest popular vote of his political career. Adair reached the height of his popularity with a landslide win in the 1982 Alberta general election. When Don Getty became Premier in 1985, Adair became the new Minister of Consumer and Corporate Affairs. After the 1986 general election he was transferred to the Ministry of Transportation and Utilities. In the 1989 Alberta general election he took 66% of the popular vote, the highest of his career. Adair was left out of the cabinet when Ralph Klein became Premier in 1992. He retired from provincial politics with the dissolution of the Assembly in 1993.

== Late life ==
After retiring from politics, Adair co-authored a book with Frank J. Dolphin titled Boomer: My Life with Peter, Don and Ralph, which was published in 1994 by Polar Bear Publishing. He died of a heart attack on December 24, 1996, at the age of 67. The Al 'Boomer' Adair Rec Centre in Peace River, Alberta, is named in his honor.

Legislative Assembly of Alberta
Preceded by Robert Wiebe	MLA Peace River; 1971–1993	Succeeded by Gary Friedel
