= William Gilliland =

Canadian politician

William Floyd Gilliland

Member of the Legislative Assembly of Alberta
- In office August 8, 1944 – September 5, 1961
- Preceded by: Eld Martin
- Succeeded by: Euell Montgomery
- Constituency: Peace River

Personal details
- Born: December 17, 1890 South Mountain, Ontario, Canada
- Died: September 5, 1961 (aged 70) Edmonton, Alberta, Canada
- Party: Social Credit
- Occupation: farmer, politician

William Floyd Gilliland (December 17, 1890 – September 5, 1961) was a politician from Alberta, Canada. He served in the Legislative Assembly of Alberta from 1944 until his death in 1961, as a member of the governing Social Credit caucus.

== Early life ==
Gilliland was a farmer in the Peace River district for thirty years before running for public office.

== Political career ==
Gilliland first ran for a seat in the Albert Legislature in the 1944 general election. He was nominated as the Social Credit candidate in Peace River on the second count at a convention held in Grimshaw, Alberta on March 2, 1944. Gilliland took over 50% of the vote to defeat incumbent independent Eld Martin and two other candidates.

In the 1948 general election Gilliland defeated two other candidates with over 60% of the popular vote. Of the eleven MLAs who represented Peace River until 1948 he was the only one to win a second term in office.

In the 1952 general election Gilliland rolled up a very large majority over two other candidates. In the 1955 general election he won over 50% of the popular vote to hold his district.

In the 1959 general election Gilliland defeated two other candidates with over 60% of the popular vote.

Gilliland suffered a heart attack at the 1961 Social Credit national convention in Ottawa. He died later that year while hospitalized in Edmonton.
