= William Bailey (Canadian politician) =

Canadian politician

William Henry Bailey
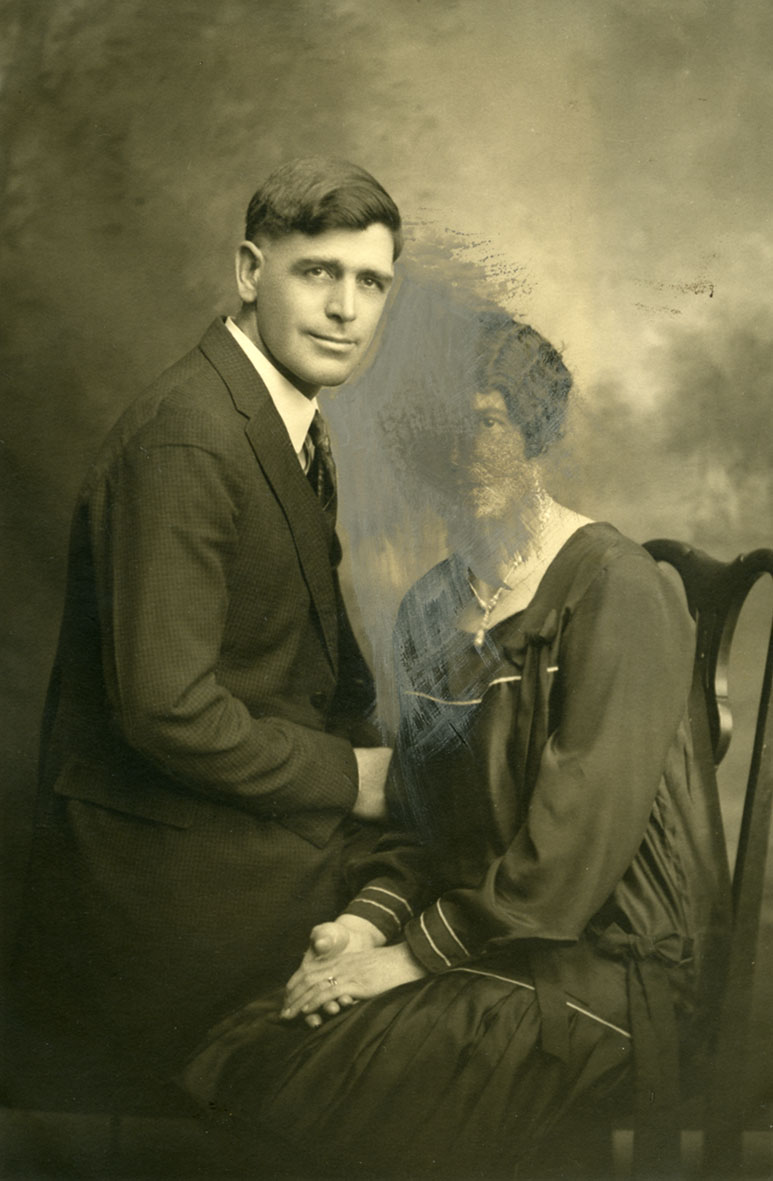

Member of the Legislative Assembly of Alberta
- In office June 19, 1930 – August 22, 1935
- Preceded by: Hugh Allen
- Succeeded by: William Lampley
- Constituency: Peace River

Personal details
- Born: November 9, 1889 Indington, Michigan
- Died: December 7, 1975 (aged 86)
- Party: United Farmers
- Occupation: politician

William Henry Bailey (November 9, 1889 – December 7, 1975) was a provincial politician from Alberta, Canada. He served as a member of the Legislative Assembly of Alberta from 1930 to 1935 sitting with the governing United Farmers of Alberta caucus.

== Early life ==
Bailey was born in Michigan.

== Political career ==
Bailey ran for a seat to the Alberta Legislature as the United Farmers candidate in the provincial electoral district of Peace River in the 1930 Alberta general election. He won a straight fight over Independent C.W. Frederick taking over 60% of the popular vote to retain the seat for his party.

Bailey ran for a second term in the 1935 Alberta general election. He face a hotly contested four-way race. On the first count of voting Bailey was trailing in third place. He would be eliminated on the second count. Social Credit candidate William Lampley won the district on the third count.
