= Debbie Jabbour =

Canadian politician

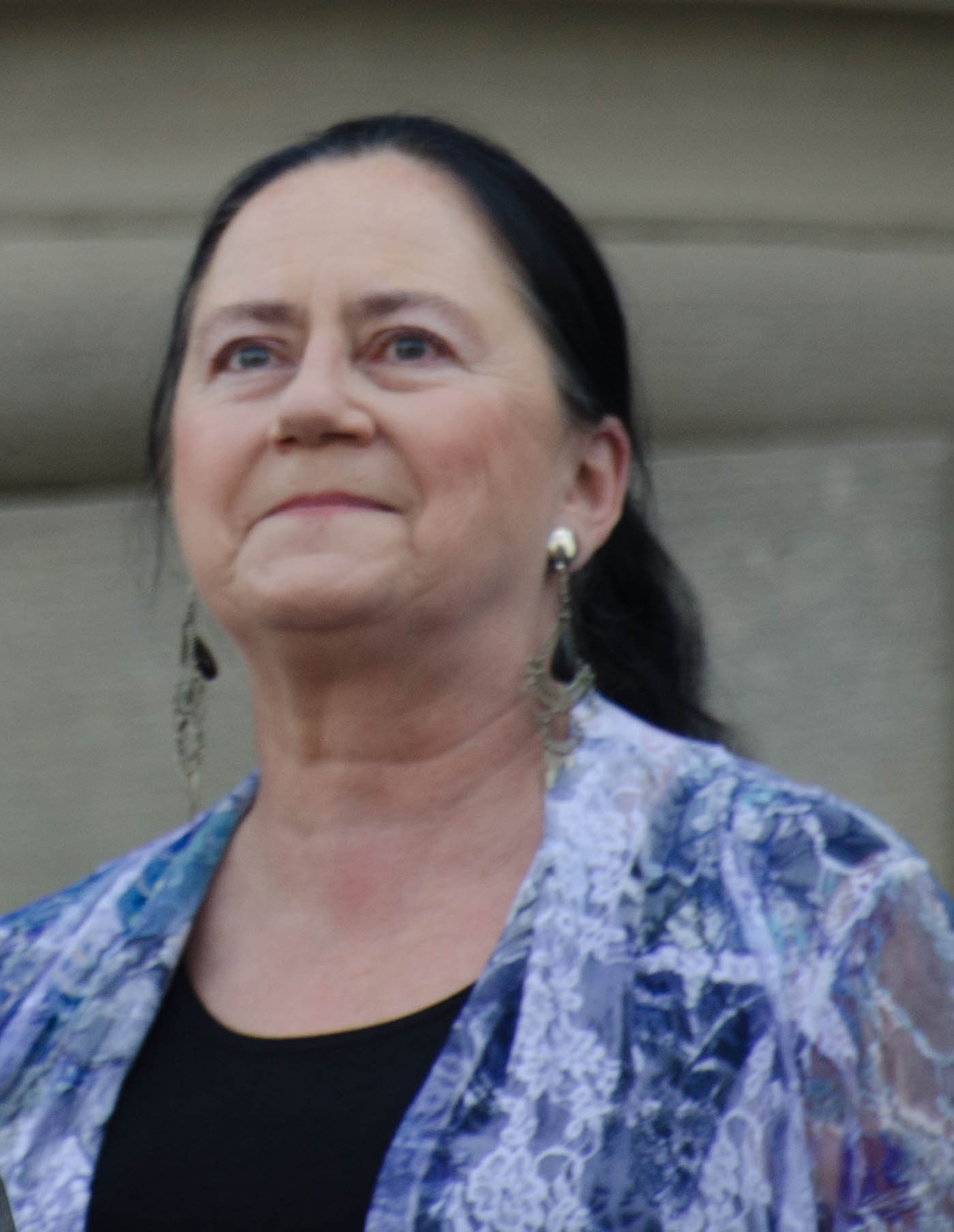
- Jabbour in May 2015

Member of the Legislative Assembly of Alberta for Peace River
- In office May 5, 2015 – March 19, 2019
- Preceded by: Frank Oberle
- Succeeded by: Dan Williams

Personal details
- Born: 1954 or 1955 (age 70–71) Edmonton, Alberta
- Party: Alberta New Democratic Party
- Occupation: Provisional Psychologist

Deborah Cecile "Debbie" Jabbour (born 1954 or 1955) is a Canadian politician who was elected in the 2015 Alberta general election to the Legislative Assembly of Alberta representing the electoral district of Peace River. She is a provisional psychologist at the Addictions & Mental Health ward of the Northwest Health Centre in High Level, Alberta, where she moved in 2014.

== Electoral history ==
=== 2019 general election ===
2019 Alberta general election: Peace River
Party	Candidate	Votes	%	±%
United Conservative	Dan Williams	9,770	69.40	+13.18
New Democratic	Debbie Jabbour	3,139	22.30	-18.01
Alberta Party	Dakota House	721	5.12	1.65
Freedom Conservative	Connie Russell	249	1.77	–
Liberal	Remi J. Tardif	198	1.41	–
Total		14,077	99.18	–
Rejected, spoiled and declined		117	0.82	
Turnout		14,194	60.51	
Eligible voters		23,458		
United Conservative gain from New Democratic		Swing		+15.59
Source(s) Source: "77 - Peace River, 2019 Alberta general election". officialresults.elections.ab.ca. Elections Alberta.

=== 2015 general election ===
2015 Alberta general election: Peace River
Party	Candidate	Votes	%	±%
New Democratic	Debbie Jabbour	3,821	39.37	+30.00
Progressive Conservative	Frank Oberle	3,529	36.36	-19.33
Wildrose	Nathan Steinke	1,979	20.39	-8.01
Alberta Party	Sherry Hilton	376	3.87	
Total valid votes		9,705		
Rejected, spoiled, and declined		40		
Registered electors / turnout		20,464	47.62	+7.36
New Democratic gain from Progressive Conservative		Swing		+24.67
Source(s) Elections Alberta. "Electoral Division Results: Peace River".
