= Eld Martin =

Canadian politician

Eld James Martin

Member of the Legislative Assembly of Alberta
- In office March 21, 1940 – August 8, 1944
- Preceded by: William Lampley
- Succeeded by: William Gilliland
- Constituency: Peace River

Personal details
- Born: July 5, 1886 Oxford, England
- Died: September 16, 1968 (aged 82)
- Party: Independent
- Occupation: politician

Eld James "Eddie" Martin (July 5, 1886 – September 16, 1968) was a politician from Alberta, Canada. He served in the Legislative Assembly of Alberta from 1940 to 1944 as an independent.

== Political career ==
Martin ran as an independent candidate in the 1940 Alberta general election in a straight fight against incumbent Social Credit MLA William Bailey. He defeated Bailey by 139 votes. In the 1944 general election he was defeated in a four-way race by Social Credit candidate W. Floyd Gilliland.
