= Lucien Dubuc =

Canadian judge

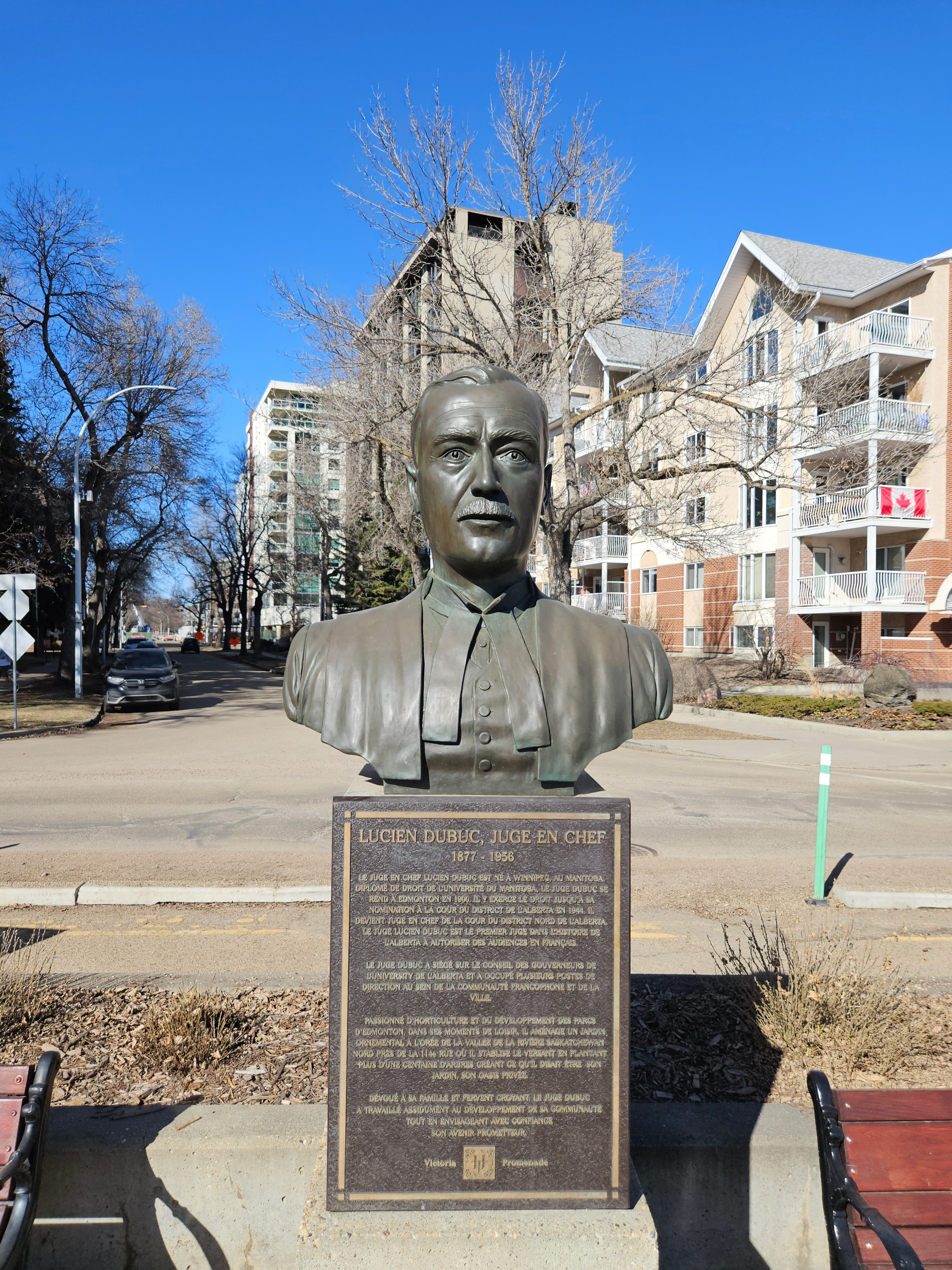
- A bust of Dubuc by Danek Mozdzenski on Edmonton's Victoria Promenade

Member Elect to the Legislative Assembly of Alberta
- In office November 9, 1905 – November 9, 1905
- Preceded by: New District
- Succeeded by: Thomas Brick
- Constituency: Peace River

Personal details
- Born: November 29, 1877 Saint Boniface, Manitoba
- Died: March 5, 1956 (aged 78) Edmonton, Alberta
- Party: Independent
- Children: André
- Occupation: Lawyer, Judge

Lucien Dubuc (November 29, 1877 – March 5, 1956) was a lawyer, judge and briefly a provincial level politician from Alberta, Canada.

== Early life ==
Lucien Dubuc's father was Joseph Dubuc, who was a prominent Canadian federal and provincial politician and a pioneer lawyer.

== Political career ==
Dubuc ran for a seat in the Alberta Legislature in the Peace River provincial electoral district as an Independent in the 1905 Alberta general election. He defeated Liberal candidate James Cornwall by an unknown number of votes.

The election, however, was overturned by the provincial cabinet due to significant irregularities and even going so far as to question whether the vote was held at all. Dubuc took the matter to court to force the Executive council to recognize the results and prevent the calling of a new election. His legal action failed when the judge ruled that they had no jurisdiction in the matter.

== Judicial career ==
Dubuc moved to a house he had built in Edmonton in 1912 where he resided until 1956. He set up a legal practice in Edmonton when he arrived in 1912. He was appointed to the district court bench in 1920 and in 1924 Chief Justice of Northern Alberta.

His obituary was printed in The Edmonton Journal on March 6, 1956.
