= Euell Montgomery =

Canadian politician

Euell F. Montgomery

Member of the Legislative Assembly of Alberta
- In office October 26, 1961 – May 23, 1967
- Preceded by: William Gilliland
- Succeeded by: Robert Wiebe
- Constituency: Peace River

Personal details
- Born: November 9, 1915
- Died: October 9, 2004 (aged 88)
- Party: Social Credit
- Occupation: politician

Euell Ferguson Montgomery (November 9, 1915 – October 9, 2004) was a provincial politician from Alberta, Canada. He served as a member of the Legislative Assembly of Alberta from 1961 to 1967 sitting with the governing Social Credit caucus.

== Political career ==
Montgomery ran as the Social Credit candidate in a by-election held in the Peace River provincial electoral district on October 26, 1961. He won the seat with a landslide of almost 65% of the popular vote to hold it for his party.

Montgomery ran for a second term in office in the 1963 Alberta general election. He held his majority from the by-election winning over 60% of the vote defeating two other candidates. He retired from politics at dissolution of the legislature in 1967.
