= Frank Oberle Jr. =

Canadian politician (born 1957)

The Honourable Frank Oberle ECA

Member of the Alberta Legislative Assembly for Peace River
- In office 2004–2015
- Preceded by: Gary Friedel
- Succeeded by: Debbie Jabbour

Solicitor General and Minister of Public Security
- In office 2010–2011

Minister of Sustainable Resource Development
- In office 2011–2012

Minister of Aboriginal Relations
- In office 2013–2014

Minister of Energy
- In office 2014–2015

Personal details
- Born: October 27, 1957 (age 68) Ashcroft, British Columbia
- Party: Progressive Conservative
- Education: University of New Brunswick
- Occupation: Professional forester

Frank Edward Oberle Jr. ECA (born October 27, 1957) is a Canadian politician who was a member of the Legislative Assembly of Alberta representing the provincial constituency of Peace River as a Progressive Conservative, from 2004 to 2015.

== Early life ==
Oberle was born in Ashcroft, British Columbia. He studied forest resource technology at the College of New Caledonia in Prince George in 1980. In 1988, he obtained a bachelor of science in forestry from the University of New Brunswick. Oberle won the Governor General's Award (gold medal) in forestry, the highest university achievement in 1988.

Oberle worked for Daishowa-Marubeni International Ltd. from 1988 until his election in 2004, first as a management forester and, subsequently, as senior forestry advisor. He is a registered professional forester (RPF) with the College of Professional Foresters (CAPF).

Oberle's father, Frank Oberle Sr., served as the Member of Parliament for Prince George—Peace River from 1972 to 1993. Frank Oberle Sr. served as the Minister of State for Science and Technology and, later, the Minister of Forestry under Prime Minister Brian Mulroney.

== Political career ==
Oberle was first elected as MLA for Peace River in the 2004 provincial election with 55 per cent of the vote. During his first term, he served as a member of the Agenda and Priorities Committee, the Standing Committee on Resources and Environment, the Cabinet Policy Committee on Resources and the Environment, and the Energy Council. Oberle also served as chief government whip and deputy chair of the Members Services Committee prior to his appointment to cabinet.

Oberle was elected to a second term representing the constituency of Peace River in the 2008 provincial election, receiving 65 per cent of the vote. He served as chief government whip. Oberle also served as the deputy chair of the Special Standing Committee on Members Services and was a member of the Privileges and Elections, Standing Orders and Printing Committee. He was Solicitor General and Minister of Public Security from 2010 to 2011, Minister of Sustainable Resource Development from 2011 to 2012, Minister of Aboriginal Relations from 2013 to 2014 and Minister of Energy from 2014 to 2015.

Oberle was defeated in the 2015 election, and Debbie Jabbour of the Alberta New Democratic Party became MLA for Peace River.

== Personal life ==
Oberle lives with his wife Debbie in Red Deer. The couple has two children, Kevin and Sadie. In his spare time, he enjoys fishing, woodworking, and river boating.

== Election results ==
2004 Alberta general election: Peace River
Party	Candidate	Votes	%	±%
Progressive Conservative	Frank Oberle	2,884	54.90	-9.53
Liberal	Adam Bourque	1,092	20.79	-5.51
New Democratic	Stephen Crocker	546	10.39	+4.63
Alberta Alliance	Garry Checknita	537	10.22	
Social Credit	Patsy Lindberg	194	3.70	
Total valid votes		5,253		
Rejected, spoiled, and declined		26		
Eligible electors / Turnout		17,142	30.80	-5.62
Progressive Conservative hold		Swing		-7.52
Source(s) "Peace River Statement of Official Results 2004 Alberta general election" (PDF). Elections Alberta.

2008 Alberta general election: Peace River
Party	Candidate	Votes	%	±%
Progressive Conservative	Frank Oberle	3,265	64.63	+9.73
New Democratic	Adele Boucher Rymhs	1,248	24.70	+14.31
Wildrose Alliance	George Beinert	539	10.67	+0.45
Total valid votes		5,052		
Rejected, spoiled, and declined		29		
Eligible electors / Turnout		18,921	26.70	-4.10
Progressive Conservative hold		Swing		-2.29
Source(s) The Report on the March 3, 2008 Provincial General Election of the Twenty-seventh Legislative Assembly. Elections Alberta. July 28, 2008. pp. 502–507.

2012 Alberta general election: Peace River
Party	Candidate	Votes	%	±%
Progressive Conservative	Frank Oberle	4,339	55.69	-8.94
Wildrose	Alan Forsyth	2,213	28.40	+17.73
New Democratic	Wanda Laurin	730	9.37	-15.33
Liberal	Remi Tardif	509	6.53	
Total valid votes		7,791		
Rejected, spoiled, and declined		40		
Registered electors / turnout		19,452	40.26	+13.56
Progressive Conservative hold		Swing		-13.34
Source(s) Elections Alberta. "Electoral Division Results: Peace River".

2015 Alberta general election: Peace River
Party	Candidate	Votes	%	±%
New Democratic	Debbie Jabbour	3,821	39.37	+30.00
Progressive Conservative	Frank Oberle	3,529	36.36	-19.33
Wildrose	Nathan Steinke	1,979	20.39	-8.01
Alberta Party	Sherry Hilton	376	3.87	
Total valid votes		9,705		
Rejected, spoiled, and declined		40		
Registered electors / turnout		20,464	47.62	+7.36
New Democratic gain from Progressive Conservative		Swing		+24.67
Source(s) Elections Alberta. "Electoral Division Results: Peace River".

Alberta provincial government of Ed Stelmach
Cabinet posts (2)
Predecessor	Office	Successor
Fred Lindsay	Minister of Public Security; 2010–present	Incumbent
Fred Lindsay	Solicitor General; 2010–present	Incumbent
