= Joseph Dubuc =

Canadian politician

The Honourable Sir Joseph Dubuc
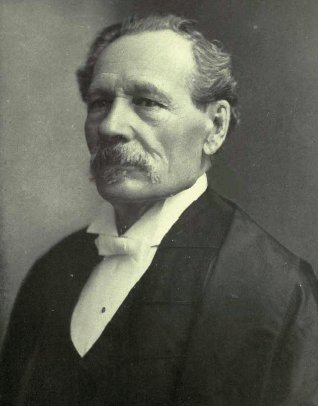

Member of the Canadian Parliament for Provencher
- Incumbent
- Assumed office 1879
- Preceded by: Andrew Bannatyne
- Succeeded by: Joseph Royal

Member of the Legislative Assembly of Manitoba for Baie St-Paul
- In office 1870–1874

Member of the Legislative Assembly of Manitoba for St. Norbert
- In office 1874–1878

3rd Speaker of the Legislative Assembly of Manitoba
- In office March 31, 1875 – December 1878
- Preceded by: Curtis Bird
- Succeeded by: John Sifton

Personal details
- Born: 26 December 1840 Sainte-Martine, near Châteauguay, Lower Canada
- Died: 7 January 1914 (aged 73) Los Angeles, California
- Party: Conservative
- Spouse(s): Maria Anna Hénault m. June 1872
- Children: Lucien Dubuc
- Profession: lawyer

Sir Joseph Dubuc (26 December 1840 – 7 January 1914), was a Canadian lawyer, politician, and judge who was born in Lower Canada and became an important political figure from Manitoba.

== Early life ==
Dubuc was from a large family and was irregularly in school because of family responsibilities. He spent some time in the United States and learned English while working in a factory. Upon returning to Quebec, he completed military school in Montreal in November 1866. He further engaged in formal studies, latterly at the Petit Séminaire de Montreal, where he made friends with Louis Riel. This connection would shape his political life in the future. He received a Bachelor of Common Law degree from McGill College in 1869 and was called to the Lower Canada bar the same year.

In January 1870, Riel called on him to help with the new provisional government that had been established as part of the Red River Rebellion. Dubuc left for Manitoba in June and, upon his arrival in the Red River area, became friends with Bishop Alexandre-Antonin Taché who dissuaded him of his doubts. He wrote articles for the Montreal newspaper La Minerve explaining the position of the Métis and encouraging francophones to settle in the Canadian West. In 1871, he was accepted into the Manitoba bar. Following the end of the rebellion Dubuc established a law practice in Winnipeg and was editor a French-language weekly, Le Métis, aimed at the Métis population.

He had a son Lucien Dubuc who went on to become a famous Judge.

== Political career ==
He was acclaimed to the first provincial legislature when elections were held in 1870 at the Baie St-Paul riding. He persuaded Riel to run for the House of Commons of Canada in 1872 and was almost beaten to death in the ensuing riots.

Dubuc worked to preserve the alliance between French Canadians and Métis. Politically he was a Conservative and ultramontane (supporter of the clergy). He served as attorney-general in the government of Marc-Amable Girard in 1872 but only served for a few months until the Girard ministry fell and was replaced by one formed by Robert Atkinson Davis, In March 1875, Dubuc was chosen Speaker of the Legislative Assembly of Manitoba serving until 1878. He also served on the Council of the North-West Territories from 1872 to 1876.

Dubuc resigned from the provincial legislature was acclaimed in Provencher in the federal election of 1878 but left the House of Commons the next year to accept a judicial appointment on the Court of Queen's Bench of Manitoba.

He grew estranged from Riel calling him a "dangerous maniac" following the Second Riel Rebellion.

== Late life ==
Dubuc unsuccessfully opposed the government of Thomas Greenway's move to reduce French-language rights and make English the sole language of the province during the Manitoba Schools Question debate and was a dissenting judge in the case of Barrett v. City of Winnipeg where the majority of the court ruled that the government had a right to establish a public school system to the detriment of French-language Catholic schools.

In 1903, he became chief justice of Manitoba and retired from the bench in 1909. In 1912 he was knighted, the first western French Canadian to be so designated. In retirement, he was given the right to retain the use of the title "The Honourable".

Dubuc died unexpectedly in Los Angeles on 7 January 1914. Dubuc Street in Winnipeg was named in his honour.
