= Peace River (provincial electoral district) =

Provincial electoral district in Alberta, Canada

Coordinates: 59°N 118°W

Alberta electoral district
- Peace River within Alberta, 2017 boundaries

Provincial electoral district
- Legislature: Legislative Assembly of Alberta
MLA
Dan Williams
United Conservative
- District created: 1905
- First contested: 1905
- Last contested: 2023

Peace River is a provincial electoral district in Alberta, Canada. The district is mandated to return a single member to the Legislative Assembly of Alberta using the first past the post method of voting. The district used instant-runoff voting from 1926 to 1957.

It and St. Albert are the only two Alberta districts that have been in operation since the birth of the province. Peace River is a reliable bellwether district, held by the governing political party for most of its history — former MLA Debbie Jabbour of the NDP was no exception, as she was elected in 2015 when the Alberta NDP came to power. Then Peace River elected a United Conservative MLA in 2019 when a majority of the seats in the province went to the UCP. Peace River last elected an opposition MLA in 1940.

== Geography ==
Peace River encompasses a largely rural area in the northwest corner of Alberta. Urban municipalities within the riding include the towns of Grimshaw, High Level, Manning, Peace River, and Rainbow Lake, as well as the village of Nampa. The riding also includes the entirety of two rural municipalities (Mackenzie County and the County of Northern Lights) and portions of three others (Improvement District No. 24, the Municipal District of Peace No. 135, and Northern Sunrise County).

Four First Nations are located within the riding's boundaries: Beaver First Nation, Dene Tha' First Nation, Little Red River Cree Nation, and Tallcree First Nation.

Peace River borders the ridings of Central Peace-Notley to the southwest, Lesser Slave Lake to the southeast, and Fort McMurray-Wood Buffalo to the east. The riding also borders British Columbia to the west and the Northwest Territories to the north.

== History ==
Peace River was established when the province was created in 1905. It covers the western section of what had been the District of Athabasca, which had never been represented in the North West Assembly. The district boundaries have been revised many times over the last century since 1905, but have always contained the town of Peace River and the northwestern section of the province.

From 1924 to 1956, the district used instant-runoff voting to elect its MLA.

The 2010 boundary redistribution saw the district gain a portion of land that belongs to the Municipal District of Northern Lights that was in the old Dunvegan-Central Peace district. In the 2017 redistribution, it gained Grimshaw from Dunvegan-Central Peace-Notley.

=== Boundary description in 2003 and 2010 ===
70 Peace River 2003 boundaries
Bordering districts
North	East	West	South
none	Fort McMurray-Wood Buffalo	none	Dunvegan-Central Peace, Lesser Slave Lake
riding map goes here			
Legal description from the Statutes of Alberta 2003, Electoral Divisions Act.
Starting at the northwest corner of the Province; then 1. east along the north boundary of the Province to the west boundary of Wood Buffalo National Park; 2. south, east and south along the park boundary to the north boundary of Twp. 112 at the 5th meridian; 3. east along the north boundary of Twp. 112 to the east boundary of Rge. 23 W4; 4. south along the east boundary of Rge. 23 W4 to the north boundary of Twp. 111; 5. west along the north boundary of Twp. 111 to the 5th Meridian; 6. south along the 5th meridian to the north boundary of Twp. 105; 7. west along the north boundary of Twp. 105 to the east boundary of Rge. 12 W5; 8. south along the east boundary of Rge. 12 W5 to the north boundary of Twp. 96; 9. west along the north boundary of Twp. 96 to the east boundary of Rge. 18 W5; 10. south along the east boundary of Rge. 18 W5 to the north boundary of Twp. 79; 11. west along the north boundary of Twp. 79 to the east boundary of Rge. 20 W5; 12. north along the east boundary of Rge. 20 W5 to the north boundary of Sec. 13, Twp. 80, Rge. 20 W5; 13. west along the north boundary of Secs. 13, 14, 15, 16, 17 and 18 in Rges. 20 W5 and 21 W5 to the east boundary of Rge. 22 W5; 14. north along the east boundary of Rge. 22 W5 to the north boundary of Twp. 80; 15. west along the north boundary of Twp. 80 to the right bank of the Smoky River; 16. downstream along the right bank of the Smoky River to the intersection with the right bank of the Peace River; 17. upstream along the right bank of the Peace River to the intersection with the north boundary of Twp. 82; 18. west along the north boundary of Twp. 82 to the east boundary of Rge. 23 W5; 19. north along the east boundary of Rge. 23 W5 to the north boundary of Twp. 83; 20. west along the north boundary of Twp. 83 to the 6th meridian; 21. north along the 6th meridian to the north boundary of Twp. 85; 22. west along the north boundary to the east boundary of Rge. 2 W6; 23. north along the east boundary to the north boundary of Twp. 96; 24. east along the north boundary to the 6th meridian; 25. north along the 6th meridian to the north boundary of Twp. 104; 26. west along the north boundary to the west boundary of the Province; 27. north along the west boundary of the Province to the starting point.
Note:

74 Peace River 2010 boundaries
Bordering districts
North	East	West	South
Northwest Territories boundary	Fort McMurray-Wood Buffalo and Lesser Slave Lake	British Columbia boundary	Dunvegan-Central Peace-Notley
Legal description from the Statutes of Alberta 2010, Electoral Divisions Act.

=== Representation history ===
Members of the Legislative Assembly for Peace River
Assembly	Years	Member	Party
1st	1905	Lucien Dubuc (member-elect)	Independent
1st	1905–1906	Vacant	
1st	1906–1909	Thomas Brick	Independent Liberal
2nd	1909–1913	James Cornwall	Liberal
3rd	1913–1917	Alphaeus Patterson	Conservative
4th	1917–1921	William Rae	Liberal
5th	1921	Donald Kennedy	United Farmers
5th	1921	Vacant	
5th	1921–1926	Herbert Greenfield	United Farmers
6th	1926–1930	Hugh Allen	United Farmers
7th	1930–1935	William Bailey	United Farmers
8th	1935–1940	William Lampley	Social Credit
9th	1940–1944	Eld Martin	Independent
10th	1944–1948	William Gilliland	Social Credit
11th	1948–1952	William Gilliland	Social Credit
12th	1952–1955	William Gilliland	Social Credit
13th	1955–1959	William Gilliland	Social Credit
14th	1959–1961	William Gilliland	Social Credit
14th	1961	Vacant	
14th	1961–1963	Euell Montgomery	Social Credit
15th	1963–1967	Euell Montgomery	Social Credit
16th	1967–1971	Robert Wiebe	Social Credit
17th	1971–1975	Al Adair	Progressive; Conservative
18th	1975–1979	Al Adair	Progressive; Conservative
19th	1979–1982	Al Adair	Progressive; Conservative
20th	1982–1986	Al Adair	Progressive; Conservative
21st	1986–1989	Al Adair	Progressive; Conservative
22nd	1989–1993	Al Adair	Progressive; Conservative
23rd	1993–1997	Gary Friedel	Progressive; Conservative
24th	1997–2001	Gary Friedel	Progressive; Conservative
25th	2001–2004	Gary Friedel	Progressive; Conservative
26th	2004–2008	Frank Oberle	Progressive; Conservative
27th	2008–2012	Frank Oberle	Progressive; Conservative
28th	2012–2015	Frank Oberle	Progressive; Conservative
29th	2015–2019	Debbie Jabbour	New Democratic
30th	2019–2023	Dan Williams	United Conservative
31st	2023–present	Dan Williams	United Conservative

The electoral district was created in 1905 when the province was founded. The election contest held that year in the Peace River electoral district was a two-way race between Liberal candidate James Cornwall and Independent candidate Lucien Dubuc. Both were supporters of the Rutherford government.

The election results took weeks to be counted. Dubuc was eventually declared the winner but the results of the election were never released to the public. the cabinet overturned the results due to significant irregularities, and the riding was declared vacant. Dubuc decided not to run again but challenged the calling of a new election in court. Dubuc's case failed in court.

A new election was held on February 15, 1906. Local farmers encouraged Thomas Brick, an Independent Liberal, to run. He won by a landslide over Cornwall. Brick held the district for a single term. He was initially going to run for a second term but dropped out during the campaign in 1909. Cornwall was the only candidate in the race, so was acclaimed.

Cornwall held the district for a single term. Near the end of the 2nd Legislative term, Cornwall announced his retirement saying he was through with politics. He had been under investigation in the Alberta and Great Waterways Railway scandal that rocked the Rutherford government and forced the resignation of Premier Rutherford. The lands in the Peace River district experienced a great influx of settlers during this period.

The 1913 election was hotly contested. Conservative Alphaeus Patterson defeated future MLA William Rae and former Athabasca MLA William Bredin.

Rae won the seat in 1917 after Patterson retired. He held the seat until he was defeated in 1921 by United Farmers candidate Donald Kennedy. Kennedy resigned his seat very quickly so that Premier Herbert Greenfield could have a seat in the legislature. Greenfield represented the district for a single term. His replacement was United Farmers MLA Hugh Allen.

Allen also served just for a single term, retiring in 1930. The United Farmers chose William Bailey to run as his replacement. Bailey served from 1930 until he was defeated by Social Credit candidate William Lampley in the 1935 general election.

Lampley served until 1940 when he was defeated by Independent Eld Martin. Martin also served a single term before Social Credit candidate William Gilliland defeated him in the 1944 election.

Gilliland held the district for several terms. He was re-elected in 1948, 1952, 1955 and 1959. He died on October 26, 1961, leaving the seat vacant.

A by-election held in 1961 was won by Social Credit candidate Euell Montgomery. He held the district until 1967, winning re-election in 1963 before retiring in 1967. The last Social Credit member to hold the seat was Robert Wiebe, elected in 1967.

The 1971 election saw Wiebe defeated by Progressive Conservative candidate Al Adair. Adair held the district for six terms, being re-elected in 1975, 1979, 1982, 1986 and again in 1989. The Progressive Conservative dominance over Peace River continued as P-C candidate Gary Friedel won the district in 1993. He lasted three terms, being re-elected in 1997 and 2001 before retiring in 2004.

In 2004, Progressive Conservative Frank Oberle was elected to represent Peace River. He was re-elected to a second term in 2008, and served as the province's Energy Minister.

In 2015, a close race saw NDP MLA Debbie Jabbour defeat the incumbent Conservative MLA Oberle by a mere 282 votes. Jabbour was subsequently also elected by a majority of the assembled MLAs to serve as Deputy Speaker of the provincial legislature.

== Legislative election results ==
=== 2023 ===
2023 Alberta general election
Party	Candidate	Votes	%	±%
United Conservative	Dan Williams	8,236	72.84	+3.44
New Democratic	Liana Paiva	2,587	22.88	+0.58
Independent	Conrad Nunweiler	290	2.56	–
Alberta Independence	Sharon Noullett	194	1.72	–
Total		11,307	99.49	–
Rejected and declined		58	0.51	
Turnout		11,365	45.51	
Eligible voters		24,974		
United Conservative hold		Swing		+1.43
Source(s) Source: Elections Alberta

=== Elections in the 2010s ===
2019 Alberta general election
Party	Candidate	Votes	%	±%
United Conservative	Dan Williams	9,770	69.40	+13.18
New Democratic	Debbie Jabbour	3,139	22.30	-18.01
Alberta Party	Dakota House	721	5.12	1.65
Freedom Conservative	Connie Russell	249	1.77	–
Liberal	Remi J. Tardif	198	1.41	–
Total		14,077	99.18	–
Rejected, spoiled and declined		117	0.82	
Turnout		14,194	60.51	
Eligible voters		23,458		
United Conservative gain from New Democratic		Swing		+15.59
Source(s) Source: "77 - Peace River, 2019 Alberta general election". officialresults.elections.ab.ca. Elections Alberta.

2015 Alberta general election
Party	Candidate	Votes	%	±%
New Democratic	Debbie Jabbour	3,821	39.37	+30.00
Progressive Conservative	Frank Oberle	3,529	36.36	-19.33
Wildrose	Nathan Steinke	1,979	20.39	-8.01
Alberta Party	Sherry Hilton	376	3.87	
Total valid votes		9,705		
Rejected, spoiled, and declined		40		
Registered electors / turnout		20,464	47.62	+7.36
New Democratic gain from Progressive Conservative		Swing		+24.67
Source(s) Elections Alberta. "Electoral Division Results: Peace River".

2015 Alberta general election redistributed results
Party	Votes	%
New Democratic	4,370	40.31
Progressive Conservative	3,816	35.20
Wildrose	2,280	21.03
Alberta Party	376	3.47
Source(s) Source: Ridingbuilder

2012 Alberta general election
Party	Candidate	Votes	%	±%
Progressive Conservative	Frank Oberle	4,339	55.69	-8.94
Wildrose	Alan Forsyth	2,213	28.40	+17.73
New Democratic	Wanda Laurin	730	9.37	-15.33
Liberal	Remi Tardif	509	6.53	
Total valid votes		7,791		
Rejected, spoiled, and declined		40		
Registered electors / turnout		19,452	40.26	+13.56
Progressive Conservative hold		Swing		-13.34
Source(s) Elections Alberta. "Electoral Division Results: Peace River".

=== Elections in the 2000s ===
2008 Alberta general election
Party	Candidate	Votes	%	±%
Progressive Conservative	Frank Oberle	3,265	64.63	+9.73
New Democratic	Adele Boucher Rymhs	1,248	24.70	+14.31
Wildrose Alliance	George Beinert	539	10.67	+0.45
Total valid votes		5,052		
Rejected, spoiled, and declined		29		
Eligible electors / turnout		18,921	26.70	-4.10
Progressive Conservative hold		Swing		-2.29
Source(s) The Report on the March 3, 2008 Provincial General Election of the Twenty-seventh Legislative Assembly. Elections Alberta. July 28, 2008. pp. 502–507.

2004 Alberta general election
Party	Candidate	Votes	%	±%
Progressive Conservative	Frank Oberle	2,884	54.90	-9.53
Liberal	Adam Bourque	1,092	20.79	-5.51
New Democratic	Stephen Crocker	546	10.39	+4.63
Alberta Alliance	Garry Checknita	537	10.22	
Social Credit	Patsy Lindberg	194	3.70	
Total valid votes		5,253		
Rejected, spoiled, and declined		26		
Eligible electors / turnout		17,142	30.80	-5.62
Progressive Conservative hold		Swing		-7.52
Source(s) "Peace River Statement of Official Results 2004 Alberta general election" (PDF). Elections Alberta.

2001 Alberta general election
Party	Candidate	Votes	%	±%
Progressive Conservative	Gary Friedel	3,782	64.43	+2.71
Liberal	Susan Calihoo	1,544	26.30	-11.98
New Democratic	Steve Crocker	338	5.76	
Alberta First	John Iftody	206	3.51	
Total valid votes		5,870		
Rejected, spoiled and declined		22		
Eligible electors / turnout		16,176	36.42	-0.38
Progressive Conservative hold		Swing		+7.35
Source(s) "Peace River Official Results 2001 Alberta general election" (PDF). Elections Alberta.

=== Elections in the 1990s ===
1997 Alberta general election
Party	Candidate	Votes	%	±%
Progressive Conservative	Gary Friedel	3,745	61.72	+18.34
Liberal	Bruce MacKeen	2,323	38.28	+5.27
Total valid votes		6,068		
Rejected, spoiled and declined		46		
Eligible electors / turnout		16,613	36.80	-13.00
Progressive Conservative hold		Swing		+11.81
Source(s) "1997 General Election". Elections Alberta. Archived from the original on February 14, 2012.

1993 Alberta general election
Party	Candidate	Votes	%	±%
Progressive Conservative	Gary Friedel	3,156	43.38	-14.40
Liberal	Elmer Cardinal	2,402	33.01	+15.64
New Democratic	Brian Dewar	1,192	16.38	-8.48
Confederation of Regions	Ed Kary	526	7.23	
Total valid votes		7,276		
Rejected, spoiled and declined		24		
Eligible electors / turnout		14,660	49.80	+8.64
Progressive Conservative hold		Swing		-15.02
Source(s) "Peace River Official Results 1993 Alberta general election". Alberta Heritage Community Foundation.

=== Elections in the 1980s ===
1989 Alberta general election
Party	Candidate	Votes	%	±%
Progressive Conservative	Al Adair	3,749	57.78	-2.17
New Democratic	Adele Boucher Rymhs	1,613	24.86	-7.81
Liberal	Erich Wahl	1,127	17.37	
Total valid votes		6,489		
Rejected, spoiled and declined		17		
Eligible electors / turnout		15,808	41.16	-0.73
Progressive Conservative hold		Swing		-4.99
Source(s) "Peace River Official Results 1986 Alberta general election". Alberta Heritage Community Foundation.

1986 Alberta general election
Party	Candidate	Votes	%	±%
Progressive Conservative	Al Adair	3,775	59.95	+3.62
New Democratic	Adele Boucher Rymhs	2,057	32.67	+14.15
Representative	Joseph Kessler	291	4.62	+1.92
Independent	Anna Pidruchney	174	2.76	
Total valid votes		6,297		
Rejected, spoiled and declined		15		
Eligible electors / turnout		15,069	41.89	
Progressive Conservative hold		Swing		-5.27
Source(s) "Peace River Official Results 1986 Alberta general election". Alberta Heritage Community Foundation.

1982 Alberta general election
Party	Candidate	Votes	%	±%
Progressive Conservative	Al Adair	4,688	56.33	-3.47
Western Canada Concept	Jim Kalman	1,657	19.91	
New Democratic	Richard Collins	1,541	18.52	-6.07
Independent	Joseph Kessler	225	2.70	
Liberal	Laura Deedza	211	2.54	-1.05
Total		8,322		
Rejected, spoiled and declined		28		
Eligible electors / turnout		14,924	55.95	+3.65
Progressive Conservative hold		Swing		-11.69
Source(s) "Peace River Official Results 1982 Alberta general election". Alberta Heritage Community Foundation.

=== Elections in the 1970s ===
1979 Alberta general election
Party	Candidate	Votes	%	±%
Progressive Conservative	Al Adair	3,901	59.80	-1.20
New Democratic	Richard Collins	1,604	24.59	+2.50
Social Credit	Garry Gaudet	784	12.02	-3.32
Liberal	Donald Freeland	234	3.59	
Total valid votes		6,523		
Rejected, spoiled and declined		4		
Eligible electors / turnout		12,480	52.30	-2.15
Progressive Conservative hold		Swing		-1.85
Source(s) "Peace River Official Results 1979 Alberta general election". Alberta Heritage Community Foundation.

1975 Alberta general election
Party	Candidate	Votes	%	±%
Progressive Conservative	Al Adair	3,567	61.00	+10.77
New Democratic	John Hokanson	1,292	22.09	+10.72
Social Credit	Budd Dennis	897	15.34	-23.06
Independent Liberal	Vera Lane	92	1.57	
Total valid votes		5,848		
Rejected, spoiled and declined		23		
Eligible electors / turnout		10,782	54.45	-2.30
Progressive Conservative hold		Swing		+10.75
Source(s) "Peace River Official Results 1975 Alberta general election". Alberta Heritage Community Foundation.

1971 Alberta general election
Party	Candidate	Votes	%	±%
Progressive Conservative	Al Adair	3,188	50.23	
Social Credit	Robert Wiebe	2,437	38.40	-15.09
New Democratic	Hans Jorgensen	722	11.37	-13.65
Total valid votes		6,347		
Rejected, spoiled and declined		59		
Eligible electors / turnout		11,289	56.75	+1.94
Progressive Conservative gain from Social Credit		Swing		+32.66
Source(s) "Peace River Official Results 1971 Alberta general election". Alberta Heritage Community Foundation.

=== Elections in the 1960s ===
1967 Alberta general election
Party	Candidate	Votes	%	±%
Social Credit	Robert Wiebe	2,860	53.49	-6.93
New Democratic	Harry Reinders	1,338	25.02	
Independent	Edward Whitney	1,149	21.49	
Total valid votes		5,347		
Rejected, spoiled and declined		—		
Eligible electors / turnout		9,756	54.81	-0.90
Social Credit hold		Swing		-15.98
Source(s) "Peace River Official Results 1967 Alberta general election". Alberta Heritage Community Foundation.

1963 Alberta general election
Party	Candidate	Votes	%	±%
Social Credit	Euell Montgomery	2,782	60.42	-2.80
Liberal	Victor O'Reilly	980	21.29	+3.39
Progressive Conservative	Harold Sissons	842	18.29	-0.59
Total valid votes		4,604		
Rejected, spoiled and declined		8		
Eligible electors / turnout		8,272	55.71	-6.61
Social Credit hold		Swing		-3.10
Source(s) "Peace River Official Results 1963 Alberta general election". Alberta Heritage Community Foundation.

Alberta provincial by-election, October 26, 1961 Due to the death of F. Gilliland
Party	Candidate	Votes	%	±%
Social Credit	Euell Montgomery	2,561	63.22	+2.34
Progressive Conservative	Harold Sissons	765	18.88	-6.42
Liberal	Wilbur Freeland	725	17.90	+4.08
Total valid votes		4,051		
Rejected, spoiled and declined		—		
Eligible electors / turnout		6,500	62.32	-1.52
Social Credit hold		Swing		+4.38
Source(s) "By-elections 1905-1973". Elections Alberta. Archived from the original on June 7, 2009.

=== Elections in the 1950s ===
1959 Alberta general election
Party	Candidate	Votes	%	±%
Social Credit	William Gilliland	2,864	60.88	+7.05
Progressive Conservative	Harold Sissons	1,190	25.30	
Liberal	James Mann	650	13.82	-20.20
Total valid votes		4,704		
Rejected, spoiled and declined		19		
Eligible electors / turnout		7,398	63.84	+0.62
Social Credit hold		Swing		-18.25
Source(s) "Peace River Official Results 1959 Alberta general election". Alberta Heritage Community Foundation.

1955 Alberta general election
Party	Candidate	Votes	%	±%
Social Credit	William Gilliland	3,456	53.83	-4.54
Liberal	Wilbur Freeland	2,184	34.02	+12.88
Co-operative Commonwealth	S.D. Simpson	780	12.15	-8.34
Total valid votes		6,420		
Rejected, spoiled and declined		488		
Eligible electors / turnout		10,927	63.22	+5.36
Social Credit hold		Swing		-8.71
Source(s) "Peace River Official Results 1955 Alberta general election". Alberta Heritage Community Foundation.

1952 Alberta general election
Party	Candidate	Votes	%	±%
Social Credit	William Gilliland	3,352	58.37	-4.11
Liberal	Peter Dechant	1,214	21.14	+4.91
Co-operative Commonwealth	Samuel Simpson	1,177	20.49	-0.80
Total valid votes		5,743		
Rejected, spoiled and declined		470		
Eligible electors / turnout		10,738	57.86	-3.48
Social Credit hold		Swing		-4.51
Source(s) "Peace River Official Results 1952 Alberta general election". Alberta Heritage Community Foundation.

=== Elections in the 1940s ===
1948 Alberta general election
Party	Candidate	Votes	%	±%
Social Credit	William Gilliland	3,191	62.48	+8.47
Co-operative Commonwealth	Albert Bossert	1,087	21.29	+1.00
Liberal	J.J. Rousseau	829	16.23	
Total valid votes		5,107		
Rejected, spoiled and declined		504		
Eligible electors / turnout		9,147	61.34	-1.41
Social Credit hold		Swing		+3.74
Source(s) "Peace River Official Results 1948 Alberta general election". Alberta Heritage Community Foundation.

1944 Alberta general election
Party	Candidate	Votes	%	±%
Social Credit	William Gilliland	2,503	54.01	+5.60
Co-operative Commonwealth	J.W. Eastman	940	20.29	
Independent	Eld Martin	806	17.39	-34.20
Labor-Progressive	Eleanor Ashworth	385	8.31	
Total valid votes		4,634		
Rejected, spoiled and declined		90		
Eligible electors / turnout		7,528	62.75	+2.76
Social Credit gain from Independent Movement		Swing		+19.90
Source(s) "Peace River Official Results 1944 Alberta general election". Alberta Heritage Community Foundation.

1940 Alberta general election
Party	Candidate	Votes	%	±%
Independent Movement	Eld Martin	2,253	51.59	
Social Credit	William Lampley	2,114	48.41	+2.66
Total valid votes		4,367		
Rejected, spoiled and declined		160		
Eligible electors / turnout		7,546	59.99	-9.66
Independent Movement gain from Social Credit		Swing		+24.47
Source(s) "Peace River Official Results 1940 Alberta general election". Alberta Heritage Community Foundation.

Stunned by the Social Credit victory in 1935, the Liberals and Conservatives jointly endorsed candidates across Alberta in what was known as the Independent Citizen's Association. This was the last time an opposition MLA was elected in Peace River.

=== Elections in the 1930s ===
1935 Alberta general election
Party	Candidate	Votes	%	±%
Social Credit	William Lampley	2,269	45.75	
Liberal	E.L. Lamont	1,389	28.00	
United Farmers	William Bailey	994	20.04	-42.57
Conservative	Gerald William Baldwin	308	6.21	
Final count
Social Credit	William Lampley	2,474	56.59	+10.84
Liberal	E.L. Lamont	1,898	43.41	+15.41
Exhausted ballots		588		
Total valid votes		4,960		
Rejected, spoiled and declined		269		
Eligible electors / turnout		7,508	69.65	+21.90
Social Credit gain from United Farmers		Swing		+44.16
Source(s) "Peace River Official Results 1935 Alberta general election". Alberta Heritage Community Foundation.

1930 Alberta general election
Party	Candidate	Votes	%	±%
United Farmers	William Bailey	1,331	62.61	+7.74
Independent	C.W. Frederick	795	37.39	
Total valid votes		2,126		
Rejected, spoiled and declined		116		
Eligible electors / turnout		4,695	47.75	-23.14
United Farmers hold		Swing		-14.83
Source(s) "Peace River Official Results 1930 Alberta general election". Alberta Heritage Community Foundation.

=== Elections in the 1920s ===
1926 Alberta general election
Party	Candidate	Votes	%	±%
United Farmers	Hugh Allen	2,548	54.87	-7.81
Liberal	Joe McIsaac	1,131	24.35	-1.10
Conservative	A.R. McMillan	965	20.78	
Total valid votes		4,644		
Rejected, spoiled and declined		354		
Eligible electors / turnout		7,050	70.89	—
United Farmers hold		Swing		-3.36
Source(s) "Peace River Official Results 1926 Alberta general election". Alberta Heritage Community Foundation.

Alberta provincial by-election, December 9, 1921 Upon the resignation of Donald M. Kennedy
Party	Candidate	Votes
United Farmers	Herbert Greenfield	Acclaimed
Total votes		0
Eligible electors		7,468
United Farmers hold		
Source(s) "By-elections 1905-1973". Elections Alberta. Archived from the original on June 7, 2009.

A series of by-elections were needed after the United Farmers government took power in 1921. The United Farmers caucus chose Herbert Greenfield as the new Premier. Unfortunately he lacked a seat in the legislature.

Incumbent United Farmers MLA Donald MacBeth Kennedy resigned his district after only holding it for a few months to pursue a seat in the 1921 Canadian federal election. The only other seat available was Ponoka which had been made vacant by the death of United Farmers MLA Percival Baker. Of the two choices Greenfield chose to run in Peace River.

Along with this by-election and Ponoka five other ministerial by-elections to confirm cabinet ministers were called for an election day of December 9, 1921. This was set for one week after the 1921 Canadian federal election. The by-election writ was dropped on November 16, 1921.

Greenfield ran unopposed and was acclaimed at the nomination deadline held on December 2, 1921. The timing of the by-elections was deliberately chosen to coincide with the federal election to ensure that opposition candidates would be unlikely to oppose the cabinet ministers.

1921 Alberta general election
Party	Candidate	Votes	%	±%
United Farmers	Donald Kennedy	3,291	62.68	
Liberal	William Rae	1,336	25.45	-37.47
Independent	E.S. Farr	623	11.87	
Total votes		5,250		
Eligible electors / turnout		7,468	70.30	—
United Farmers gain from Liberal		Swing		+50.08
Source(s) "Peace River Official Results 1921 Alberta general election". Alberta Heritage Community Foundation.

=== Elections in the 1910s ===
1917 Alberta general election
Party	Candidate	Votes	%	±%
Liberal	William Rae	1,994	62.92	+17.35
Conservative	Dan Minchin	712	22.47	-27.06
Independent	Harry Adair	463	14.61	
Total votes		3,169		
Eligible electors / turnout		Unknown	—	—
Liberal gain from Conservative		Swing		+22.21
Source(s) "Peace River Official Results 1917 Alberta general election". Alberta Heritage Community Foundation.

1913 Alberta general election
Party	Candidate	Votes	%
Conservative	Alphaeus Patterson	475	49.53
Liberal	William Rae	437	45.57
Independent Liberal	William Bredin	47	4.90
Total votes		959	
Eligible electors / turnout		1,166	82.25
Conservative gain from Liberal			
Source(s) "Peace River Official Results 1913 Alberta general election". Alberta Heritage Community Foundation.

The 1913 election in the Peace River electoral district took place on September 23, 1913. It was the last district to vote in the general election.

There were three candidates chosen to run in the district. This was the first election in which the provincial Conservatives nominated a candidate; they chose Alphaeus Patterson to run under their banner.

The provincial Liberals chose William Archibald Rae, a pioneer barrister in the district, to run under their banner. Former Member of the Legislative Assembly William Bredin decided to also run as an Independent Liberal. All three candidates were residents of the town of Grande Prairie.

The election results showed a tight race between Patterson and Rae. Patterson won less than half of the popular vote while Bredin helped split the Liberal vote enough to allow Patterson to win.

Turnout and interest in the election were substantially up, as a wave of settlement had happened in the constituency in recent years.

=== Elections in the 1900s ===
1909 Alberta general election
Party	Candidate	Votes
Liberal	James Cornwall	Acclaimed
Total votes		0
Liberal gain from Independent Liberal		
Source(s) "Peace River Official Results 1909 Alberta general election". Alberta Heritage Community Foundation.

The 1909 general election in the Peace River district was scheduled to take place on July 7, 1909. The only other riding in the province that had not yet voted was the Athabasca electoral district which was scheduled to vote on July 15, 1909. This was almost five months after the rest of the province had voted.

The two candidates initially in the race were incumbent Independent Liberal Thomas Brick and Liberal James Cornwall, who had run in the district twice before. Brick decided however to drop out of the race before the nomination deadline. Cornwall was the only candidate left in the race. He was acclaimed to office on June 30, 1909.

Alberta provincial by-election, February 15, 1906 Upon the invalidation of the 1905 result by Cabinet
Party	Candidate	Votes	%
Independent Liberal	Thomas Brick	125	79.11
Liberal	James Cornwall	33	20.89
Total votes		158	
Independent Liberal pickup new district.			
Source(s) "Peace River Official Results 1905 Alberta general election". Alberta Heritage Community Foundation.

The provincial cabinet which overturned the 1905 election results due to significant irregularities issued a new writ for February 15, 1906.

The candidates in the race were James Cornwall, who was the official Liberal candidate. He decided to run for office a second time. The second candidate in the race was Peace River resident, fur trader Thomas Allen Brick who was a supporter of the Rutherford government and ran as an Independent Liberal.

Brick was nominated by a large group of residents living in the town of Peace River. asked resident and farmer Brick to run for office and represent them in Edmonton The returns were announced by returning officer George McLeod on March 5, 1906. Brick won easily, taking almost 80% of the 158 votes cast to defeat Cornwall in a landslide.

The results were certified on April 24, 1906, by the Clerk of the Executive Council in Edmonton two months after the start of the opening session of the 1st Alberta Legislative Assembly thus completing the 1905 general election.

1905 Alberta general election
Party	Candidate	Votes
Independent Liberal	Lucien Dubuc	Unknown
Liberal	James Cornwall	Unknown
Total votes		Unknown
Independent Liberal pickup new district.		

The first election held in 1905 in the Peace River electoral district took place on November 9, 1905, with the rest of the province.

The race was contested by James Cornwall who was a fur trader and businessman well known in northern Canada. He established trading posts all over north county. Cornwall's candidacy was officially endorsed by the provincial Liberals.

The other candidate in the race was Independent Lucien Dubuc. He was a lawyer and later became a judge and was a legal pioneer in Alberta's history. Dubuc despite being independent supported the government of Premier Alexander Rutherford.

Pundits had expected Cornwall to win the district easily. The returns came back 56 days after polls had closed as returning officer George Mcleod had to travel 1,100 miles to pick up the ballot boxes before returning to Edmonton.

Dubuc was elected but the cabinet refused to recognize the results on the grounds that a proper election was never really held and returns were incomplete as polling stations were missed. A new election was called for February 15, 1906, instead. Dubuc challenged the calling of a new election in court. The case was lost when the judge ruled that the courts have no jurisdiction in dealing with matters regarding elections and that responsibility is the purview of the legislature.

== Senate nominee election results ==
=== 2004 ===
2004 Senate nominee election results: Peace River				Turnout 30.77%	
Affiliation	Candidate	Votes	% votes	% ballots	Rank
Progressive Conservative	Betty Unger	2,125	14.84%	48.57%	2
Progressive Conservative	Bert Brown	1,957	13.67%	44.73%	1
Progressive Conservative	Cliff Breitkreuz	1,618	11.30%	36.98%	3
Independent	Link Byfield	1,515	10.58%	34.63%	4
Progressive Conservative	David Usherwood	1,469	10.26%	33.58%	6
Progressive Conservative	Jim Silye	1,280	8.94%	29.26%	5
Alberta Alliance	Michael Roth	1,198	8.37%	27.38%	7
Alberta Alliance	Vance Gough	1,078	7.53%	24.64%	8
Alberta Alliance	Gary Horan	1,071	7.47%	24.48%	10
Independent	Tom Sindlinger	1,009	7.04%	23.06%	9
Total votes		14,320	100%		
Total ballots		4,375	3.27 votes per ballot		
Rejected, spoiled and declined		899			

Voters had the option of selecting four candidates on the ballot.

== Plebiscite results ==
=== 1948 electrification plebiscite ===
District results from the first province wide plebiscite on electricity regulation:

Option A	Option B
Are you in favour of the generation and distribution of electricity being continued by the Power Companies?	Are you in favour of the generation and distribution of electricity being made a publicly owned utility administered by the Alberta Government Power Commission?
1,914 42.90%	2,547 57.10%
Province wide result: Option A passed.

=== 1957 liquor plebiscite ===
1957 Alberta liquor plebiscite results: Peace River
Question A: Do you approve additional types of outlets for the sale of beer, wine and spirituous liquor subject to a local vote?
Ballot choice	Votes	%
Yes	1,871	68.09%
No	877	31.91%
Total votes	2,748	100%
Rejected, spoiled and declined	14	
10,020 eligible electors, turnout 27.57%

On October 30, 1957, a stand-alone plebiscite was held province wide in all 50 of the then current provincial electoral districts in Alberta. The government decided to consult Alberta voters to decide on liquor sales and mixed drinking after a divisive debate in the legislature. The plebiscite was intended to deal with the growing demand for reforming antiquated liquor control laws.

The plebiscite was conducted in two parts. Question A, asked in all districts, asked the voters if the sale of liquor should be expanded in Alberta, while Question B, asked in a handful of districts within the corporate limits of Calgary and Edmonton, asked if men and women should be allowed to drink together in establishments.

Province wide Question A of the plebiscite passed in 33 of the 50 districts while Question B passed in all five districts. Peace River overwhelmingly voted in favour of the proposal by a wide margin. Voter turnout in the district was extremely low, almost half the province wide average of 46%. This decline in turnout was attributed to heavy rains, high winds and flooding conditions in the district that kept people away from polling stations.

Official district returns were released to the public on December 31, 1957. The Social Credit government in power at the time did not consider the results binding. However the results of the vote led the government to repeal all existing liquor legislation and introduce an entirely new Liquor Act.

Municipal districts lying inside electoral districts that voted against the plebiscite were designated Local Option Zones by the Alberta Liquor Control Board and considered effective dry zones. Business owners who wanted a license had to petition for a binding municipal plebiscite in order to be granted a license.

== Student vote results ==
=== 2004 ===
Participating schools
Blue Hills Community School
Good Shepherd School
Hill Crest Community School
Manning Elementary School
Rosary School
Spirit of the North School
T.A. Norris Jr. High

On November 19, 2004, a student vote was conducted at participating Alberta schools to parallel the 2004 Alberta general election results. The vote was designed to educate students and simulate the electoral process for persons who have not yet reached the legal majority. The vote was conducted in 80 of the 83 provincial electoral districts with students voting for actual election candidates. Schools with a large student body that reside in another electoral district had the option to vote for candidates outside of the electoral district than where they were physically located.

2004 Alberta student vote results
Affiliation	Candidate	Votes	%
Progressive Conservative	Frank Oberle	296	49.50%
Liberal	Adam Borque	86	14.38%
NDP	Stephen Crocker	84	14.05%
Social Credit	Patsy Lindberg	69	11.54%
Alberta Alliance	Garry Checknita	63	10.53%
Total		598	100%
Rejected, spoiled and declined		42	

== See also ==
- List of Alberta provincial electoral districts
- Canadian provincial electoral districts
