= List of settlements in Alberta =

A settlement in Alberta is a subdivided area of land that was surveyed prior to the establishment of the Third System of Survey under the Dominion Land Survey. Settlements do not necessarily fit within the Alberta Township Survey grid system.

== List of settlements ==
Alberta has 47 unique settlements according to Alberta Boundary Data. Most settlements are in rural areas while some are located within or adjacent to urban areas.

Settlement	Specialized or rural municipality	Urban municipality	First Nation or Métis settlement	Remarks
Athabasca Landing Settlement	Athabasca County	Athabasca		
Atikamisis Lake Settlement	Big Lakes County and Northern Sunrise County		Utikoomak Lake 155 and Gift Lake Metis Settlement	
Big Prairie Settlement	Big Lakes County		Pakashan 150D	
Boyer Settlement	Mackenzie County			
Chipewyan Settlement	Wood Buffalo, RM of		Dog Head 218	
Cline Settlement	Clearwater County			
Dunvegan Settlement	Fairview No. 136, MD of and Birch Hills County			
Fitzgerald (Smith Landing) Settlement	Wood Buffalo, RM of		Thebathi 196	
Flyingshot Lake Settlement	Grande Prairie No. 1, County of	Grande Prairie		
Footner Settlement	Mackenzie County			
Fort Saskatchewan Settlement	Sturgeon County	Fort Saskatchewan		Includes all or a portion of the Hamlet of Lamoureux
Fort Vermilion Settlement	Mackenzie County		Fort Vermilion 173B	Includes all or a portion of the Hamlet of Fort Vermilion
Grande Cache Lake Settlement	Greenview No. 16, MD of			
Grande Cache Settlement	Greenview No. 16, MD of			
Heart River and Salt Prairie Settlement	Big Lakes County		Halcro 150C	
Janvier South Settlement	Wood Buffalo, RM of			Includes all or a portion of the Hamlet of Janvier South
Joachim Settlement	Greenview No. 16, MD of			
Lac La Biche Settlement	Lac La Biche County			Includes all or a portion of the Hamlet of Lac La Biche
Lac Ste. Anne Settlement	Lac Ste. Anne County	Alberta Beach and Sunset Point		
Lesser Slave Lake Settlement	Big Lakes County		Freeman 150B	Includes all or a portion of the Hamlet of Grouard
Little Buffalo Lake Settlement	Northern Sunrise County			Includes all or a portion of the Hamlet of Little Buffalo
Lobstick Settlement	Smoky Lake County			
Mariana Settlement	Wood Buffalo, RM of			
McKay Settlement	Wood Buffalo, RM of			Includes all or a portion of the Hamlet of Fort McKay
McMurray Settlement	Wood Buffalo, RM of			Includes a portion of the Urban Service Area of Fort McMurray
Morleyville Settlement	Bighorn No. 8, MD of	Ghost Lake		
Muskeeg-Seepee Settlement	Greenview No. 16, MD of			
North Vermilion Settlement	Mackenzie County			
North Zama Settlement	Mackenzie County			Includes all or a portion of the Hamlet of Zama City
Otauwau Settlement	Lesser Slave River No. 124, MD of			
Peace River Landing Settlement	Northern Sunrise County	Peace River		
Pelican Settlement	Opportunity No. 17, MD of			
Red Earth Settlement	Opportunity No. 17, MD of			Includes all or a portion of the Hamlet of Red Earth Creek
Sandy Lake Settlement	Opportunity No. 17, MD of			Includes all or a portion of the Hamlet of Sandy Lake
Shaftesbury Settlement	Peace No. 135, MD of	Peace River		
Spirit River Settlement	Spirit River No. 133, MD of			
St. Albert Settlement	Sturgeon County and Parkland County	St. Albert		
St. Bruno Farm	Wood Buffalo, RM of and ID No. 24			
Steen River Settlement	Mackenzie County			
Susa Creek Settlement	Greenview No. 16, MD of			
Tugate Settlement	Mackenzie County			
Victor Lake Settlement	Greenview No. 16, MD of			
Victoria Settlement	Smoky Lake County			
Wabiskaw Settlement	Opportunity No. 17, MD of			Includes all or a portion of the Hamlet of Wabasca
Wanyandie Flats East Settlement	Greenview No. 16, MD of			
Wanyandie Flats West Settlement	Greenview No. 16, MD of			
Ya-Ha-Tinda Ranch	Clearwater County			

== See also ==
- List of cities in Alberta
- List of communities in Alberta
- List of designated places in Alberta
- List of hamlets in Alberta
- List of Indian reserves in Alberta
- List of localities in Alberta
- List of municipal districts in Alberta
- List of municipalities in Alberta
- List of summer villages in Alberta
- List of towns in Alberta
- List of villages in Alberta
- Métis in Alberta
- Specialized municipalities of Alberta
