= Alberta Highway 686 =

Highway in Alberta

Highway 686

Route information
- Maintained by Alberta Transportation
- Length: 91.72 km (56.99 mi)

Main segment
- Length: 89.55 km (55.64 mi)
- West end: Highway 88 at Red Earth Creek
- East end: Trout Lake

Fort McMurray segment (Parsons Access Road)
- Length: 2.17 km (1.35 mi)
- West end: North Parsons Gateway (road)
- East end: Highway 63 in Fort McMurray

Location
- Country: Canada
- Province: Alberta
- Specialized and rural municipalities: M.D. of Opportunity No. 17; R.M. of Wood Buffalo
- Major cities: Fort McMurray

Highway system
- Alberta Numbered Highway Network; List; Former
← Highway 685	→ Highway 688

Alberta Provincial Highway No. 686, also known as Highway 686, is an east–west highway in northern Alberta, Canada. It has two sections; the main section is a gravel highway that spans approximately 90 kilometres (56 mi) from Highway 88 (Bicentennial Highway) near Red Earth Creek to Trout Lake, and a two-kilometre-long (1.2 mi) developing freeway section in Fort McMurray which connects Highway 63 with the new neighbourhood of Parsons Creek known as Parsons Access Road.

Highway 686 comprises the western segment of the partially constructed Northern Alberta East–West Highway Corridor.

== History ==
Highway 686 used to continue west from Red Earth Creek to the Mackenzie Highway (Highway 35), approximately 37 kilometres (23 mi) northwest of Peace River; the highway was renumbered to Highway 986 in the mid-1990s.

In 2015, the Parsons Access Road was opened in Fort McMurray which connected Highway 63 to the developing residential neighbourhood Parsons Creek, with interchanges at Highway 63 (known as the Parsons Creek Interchange) and the access road currently referred to as the North Parsons Gateway.

== Future ==
=== East–West Connector ===
In 2009, the provincial government completed a study on a 218 km (135 mi) east–west highway connection between Fort McMurray and Red Earth Creek, connecting with Highway 686 north of Peerless Lake. As part of the highway, the Fort McMurray portion would be a short freeway with connections to Parsons Creek and Confederation Way/Thickwood Boulevard. The Parsons Creek Interchange at Highway 63 was staged to accommodate an eastern extension across the Athabasca River. In April 2023, the province signed agreements with Loon River First Nation, Peerless Trout First Nation and Bigstone Cree Nation to begin work on the extension, as well as paving of the existing segment between Red Earth Creek and Trout Lake.

=== East Clearwater Highway ===
Following the 2016 Fort McMurray Wildfire, the Regional Municipality of Wood Buffalo council unanimously voted in support of a second highway that would serve as an alternate evacuation route tentatively called the "East Clearwater Highway". It would run east of Fort McMurray as an extension of Highway 881 near Anzac, crossing the Clearwater River and continue north towards Fort MacKay. As part of the project, Highway 686 would continue east across the Athabasca River and connect with the new highway.

== Major intersections ==
Starting from the west end of Highway 686:

Rural/specialized municipality	Location	km	mi	Destinations	Notes
M.D. of Opportunity No. 17	Red Earth Creek	0.0	0.0	Highway 88 (Bicentennial Highway) – Fort Vermilion, Slave Lake; To Highway 986 west – Peace River	
M.D. of Opportunity No. 17		53.4	33.2	road	Future Hwy 686 extension
M.D. of Opportunity No. 17	Peerless Lake	64.2	39.9		
M.D. of Opportunity No. 17	Trout Lake	89.6	55.7		
200-kilometre (120 mi) gap in Hwy 686
R.M. of Wood Buffalo	Fort McMurray	0.0	0.0	North Parsons Gateway	Interchange
R.M. of Wood Buffalo	Fort McMurray	2.1	1.3	Highway 63 – Fort MacKay, Edmonton	Interchange
1.000 mi = 1.609 km; 1.000 km = 0.621 mi
