= Alberta Highway 35 =

Highway in Alberta

Highway 35
- Mackenzie Highway
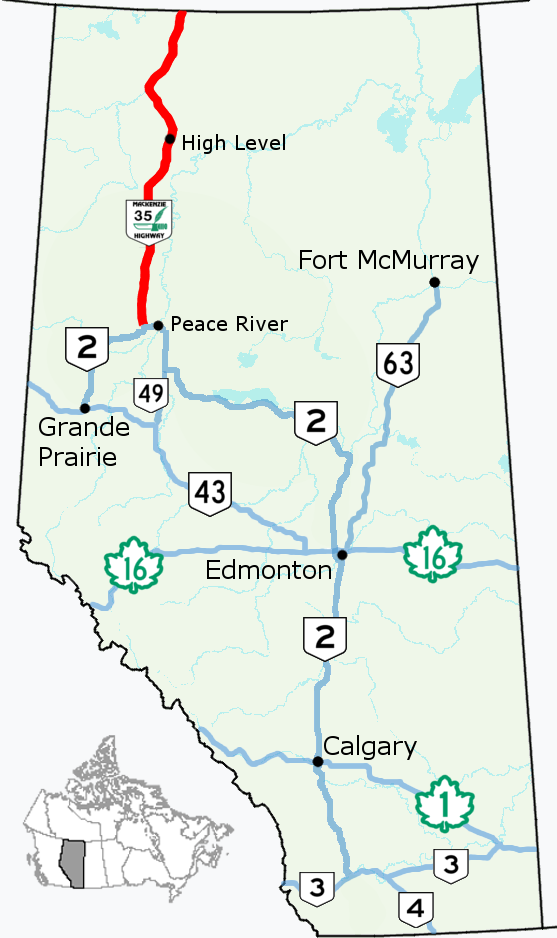
- Highway 35 highlighted in red

Route information
- Maintained by the Ministry of Transportation and Economic Corridors
- Length: 464.4 km (288.6 mi)

Major junctions
- South end: Highway 2 near Grimshaw
- Highway 986 near Dixonville; Highway 58 in High Level
- North end: Highway 1 at the NWT border near Indian Cabins

Location
- Country: Canada
- Province: Alberta
- Specialized and rural municipalities: Peace No. 135 M.D., Northern Lights County, Mackenzie County
- Towns: Manning, High Level

Highway system
- Alberta Numbered Highway Network; List; Former
← Highway 33	→ Highway 36

Alberta Provincial Highway No. 35, commonly referred to as Highway 35, is a north–south highway in northwestern Alberta, Canada that forms a portion of the Mackenzie Highway. Highway 35, along with portions of Highway 2 and Highway 49, form Alberta's Arctic Corridor that connect the CANMEX Corridor with the Northwest Territories, and is designated as a core route of Canada's National Highway System. Highway 35 is about 464 kilometres (288 mi) long.

== Route description ==
From the south, Highway 35 begins at its intersection with Highway 2, approximately 5 km (3 mi) north of the Town of Grimshaw and 19 km (12 mi) west of the Town of Peace River, and ends at Alberta's boundary with the Northwest Territories. Highway 35 passes through the towns of Manning and High Level. Upon entering the Northwest Territories, it continues on as Northwest Territories Highway 1, otherwise known as the Mackenzie Highway. It is additionally one of only two highways in Canada that connect the Northwest Territories to the rest of the country and the broader North American road network, with the other route being the Liard Highway in British Columbia.

== Major intersections ==
Rural/specialized municipality	Location	km	mi	Destinations	Notes
Grimshaw		−4.6	−2.9	Highway 2 west – Fairview, Grande Prairie Highway 2A east (55 Avenue) – Peace River	Mile Zero Mackenzie Highway.
M.D. of Peace No. 135		0.0	0.0	Highway 2 east – Peace River	Highway 35 southern terminus
County of Northern Lights		9.3	5.8	Highway 737 west (Warrensville Road)	
County of Northern Lights		15.7	9.8	Highway 986 east – Little Buffalo, Red Earth Creek	
County of Northern Lights	Dixonville	35.2	21.9	Highway 689 west	
County of Northern Lights		58.1	36.1	Highway 690 east – Deadwood	
County of Northern Lights	North Star	71.5	44.4	Township Road 910	
Manning		77.9	48.4	Highway 691 east	
County of Northern Lights		115.8	72.0	Highway 692 east – Notikewin Provincial Park	
County of Northern Lights		174.7	108.6	Highway 695 east – Carcajou	South end of Highway 695 concurrency
County of Northern Lights		181.6	112.8	Highway 695 west – Keg River	North end of Highway 695 concurrency
County of Northern Lights	Paddle Prairie	203.8	126.6		
County of Northern Lights		214.5	133.3	Highway 697 east – Tompkins Landing Ferry, La Crete	
Mackenzie County	No major junctions				
High Level		273.7	170.1	Highway 58 west – Rainbow Lake	South end of Highway 58 concurrency
High Level		275.9	171.4	Highway 58 east – Fort Vermilion, La Crete, John D'or Prairie	North end of Highway 58 concurrency
Mackenzie County	Footner Lake	286.0	177.7	UAR 227 west – High Level Airport	
Mackenzie County	Meander River	346.0	215.0		
Mackenzie County		358.8	222.9	Crosses the Hay River	
Mackenzie County		359.6	223.4	Zama Road – Zama City	
Mackenzie County	Steen River	420.7	261.4		
Mackenzie County	Indian Cabins	449.1	279.1		
Mackenzie County		464.4	288.6	Highway 1 north (Mackenzie Highway) – Hay River, Yellowknife	60th parallel; Highway 35 northern terminus; continues into Northwest Territories
1.000 mi = 1.609 km; 1.000 km = 0.621 mi: Closed/former; Concurrency terminus; Route transition
