= Alberta Highway 986 =

Highway in Alberta

Highway 986

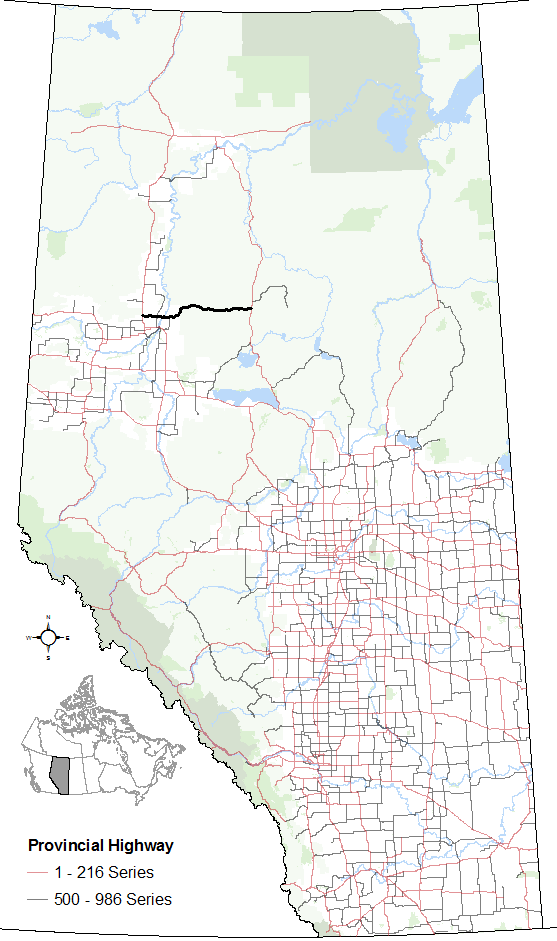

Route information
- Maintained by the Ministry of Transportation and Economic Corridors
- Length: 158 km (98 mi)

Major junctions
- West end: Highway 35 (Mackenzie Hwy)
- East end: Highway 88 (Bicentennial Hwy) near Red Earth Creek

Location
- Country: Canada
- Province: Alberta
- Specialized and rural municipalities: County of Northern Lights, Northern Sunrise County

Highway system
- Alberta Provincial Highway Network; List; Former
← Highway 956	→ Highway 1

Highway 986 is an east–west highway in Northern Alberta. It spans approximately 158 km (98 mi) from Highway 35 (Mackenzie Highway) to Highway 88 (Bicentennial Highway).

Highway 986 comprises the western segment of the partially constructed "Northern Alberta East-West Highway Corridor".

== Route description ==
Highway 986 begins at Highway 35, approximately 21 km (13 mi) north of the Town of Grimshaw and 21 km (13 mi) south of the Hamlet of Dixonville within the County of Northern Lights. After intersecting Highway 743, the highway crosses the Peace River and enters Northern Sunrise County. A short distance later, the highway intersects Highway 688. It then continues east through the hamlets of Cadotte Lake and Little Buffalo before ending at Highway 88, approximately 10 km (6.2 mi) south of the Hamlet of Red Earth Creek.

== History ==
Highway 986 was originally numbered Highway 686. The highway was renumbered in the mid-1990s.

== Major intersections ==
The following is a list of major intersections along Highway 986 from west to east.

Location	km	mi	Destinations	Notes
County of Northern Lights	0	0.0	Highway 35 (Mackenzie Highway) – Manning, High Level, Grimshaw	Western terminus
County of Northern Lights	20	12	Highway 743 – Deadwood, Peace River	
↑ / ↓	30	19	Crosses the Peace River	
Northern Sunrise County	37	23	Highway 688 south – St. Isidore	
Northern Sunrise County	158	98	Highway 88 (Bicentennial Highway) – Fort Vermilion, Red Earth Creek, Slave Lake	Eastern terminus
1.000 mi = 1.609 km; 1.000 km = 0.621 mi
