= Berwyn, Alberta =

Berwyn
- Village
- Village of Berwyn
- Location in Alberta Berwyn (Alberta)
- Coordinates: 56°08′50.9″N 117°44′01.9″W
- Country: Canada
- Province: Alberta
- Region: Northern Alberta
- Planning region: Upper Peace
- Municipal district: Peace
- Incorporated
  - Village: November 28, 1936

Government
  - Mayor: Ken Montie
  - Governing body: Berwyn Village Council

Area (2021)
  - Land: 1.57 km^{2} (0.61 sq mi)
- Elevation: 643 m (2,110 ft)

Population (2021)
  - Total: 577
  - Density: 366.6/km^{2} (949/sq mi)
- Time zone: UTC−06:00 (Alberta Time)
- Highways: Highway 2
- Waterways: Lac Cardinal
- Website: Official website

Berwyn is a village in northwestern Alberta, Canada. It is located approximately 37 km (23 mi) west of the Town of Peace River, 10 km (6.2 mi) southwest of the Town of Grimshaw, and 15 km (9.3 mi) northeast of the Duncan's First Nation reserve.

The Municipal District of Peace No. 135's municipal office is located adjacent to Berwyn. The village was named after Berwyn, Denbighshire in Wales.

== Demographics ==
Federal census population history
Year	Pop.	±%
1941	206	—
1946	308	+49.5%
1951	288	−6.5%
1956	342	+18.8%
1961	347	+1.5%
1966	430	+23.9%
1971	474	+10.2%
1976	433	−8.6%
1981	557	+28.6%
1986	661	+18.7%
1991	581	−12.1%
1996	606	+4.3%
2001	546	−9.9%
2006	516	−5.5%
2011	526	+1.9%
2016	538	+2.3%
Source: Statistics Canada

In the 2021 Census of Population conducted by Statistics Canada, the Village of Berwyn had a population of 577 living in 237 of its 274 total private dwellings, a change of 7.2% from its 2016 population of 538. With a land area of 1.57 km^{2} (0.61 sq mi), it had a population density of 367.5/km^{2} (951.9/sq mi) in 2021.

In the 2016 Census of Population conducted by Statistics Canada, the Village of Berwyn recorded a population of 538 living in 232 of its 255 total private dwellings, a 2.3% change from its 2011 population of 526. With a land area of 1.58 km^{2} (0.61 sq mi), it had a population density of 340.5/km^{2} (881.9/sq mi) in 2016.

== Education ==
Lloyd Garrison School is the only school located in Berwyn. It is a K-6 elementary institution administered by the Peace River School Division (PRSD). Junior and Senior high students are bused to either Grimshaw or Peace River. Separate school students are also bused from Berwyn to Grimshaw. In the 2009/10 school year, junior high enrolment at the school dropped to a total of 25 students, which triggered the PRSD to initiate a low enrolment review.

Post-secondary education is available at Northern Lakes College in the Peace River Campus and Fairview Campus of Grande Prairie Regional College in the Town of Fairview.

== Economy ==
Regional planning service, Mackenzie Municipal Services Agency is located in downtown Berwyn. The M.D of Peace No. 135 also has its municipal office in Berwyn.

== Health care ==
Health care for residents of Berwyn is provided for by Grimshaw Berwyn & District Community Health Centre in Grimshaw. The Peace River Community Health Centre is also within a short driving distance.

== Recreation ==
- Tower Park Recreational Area – features nature and cross country ski trails, one tennis court, one baseball diamond and bird watching areas
- Queen Elizabeth Provincial Park – located 15 km (9.3 mi) northeast of Berwyn, the park has 56 camping stalls, water skiing, boating and picnicking
- Lac Cardinal Recreation Area – located 11 km (6.8 mi) north of Berwyn, Lac Cardinal offers the Bear Lake Recreation Area and Rodeo Grounds
- Wayne Johnson Memorial Arena – offers skating, hockey and meeting facilities
- Peace Valley Guest Ranch – offers outdoor adventure including river cruise, trail riding, hiking, mini golf and bird watching

== Events ==
- Alberta Pond Hockey Championships in February at Lac Cardinal
- Volunteer Week Celebrations in April
- Senior Citizens Week Celebrations in June
- Annual Christmas Parade in December
- Family Day
- Oktoberfest

== Notable people ==
Berwyn is the birthplace of Marco Marra, a genomics expert, and Alex Debogorski of the television show Ice Road Truckers.

== See also ==
- List of communities in Alberta
- List of villages in Alberta
