= Brownvale =

- Hamlet
- Location of Brownvale Brownvale (Canada)
- Coordinates: 56°07′42″N 117°53′33″W
- Country: Canada
- Province: Alberta
- Region: Northern Alberta
- Census division: 19
- Municipal district: Municipal District of Peace No. 135

Government
  - Type: Unincorporated
  - Governing body: Municipal District of Peace No. 135 Council

Area (2021)
  - Land: 3.06 km^{2} (1.18 sq mi)

Population (2021)
  - Total: 114
  - Density: 37.2/km^{2} (96/sq mi)
- Time zone: UTC−06:00 (Alberta Time)
- Area codes: 780, 587, 825

Brownvale is a hamlet in northern Alberta, Canada within the Municipal District of Peace No. 135. It is located on Highway 737 less than 1 kilometre (0.62 mi) off Highway 2, approximately 48 kilometres (30 mi) southwest of the Town of Peace River and 20 kilometres (12 mi) southwest of Grimshaw. Duncan's First Nation reserve is less than 5 km (3.1 mi) to the south.

The community originated in the mid-1920s when the railway was extended from Berwyn to Whitelaw. The hamlet was named after John Brown who came to the area in 1913. In 1924 his homestead was chosen for the location of the community.

== Demographics ==
Population history of Brownvale
| Year | Pop. | ±% |
|---|---|---|
| 1941 | 76 | — |
| 1951 | 140 | +84.2% |
| 1956 | 177 | +26.4% |
| 1961 | 237 | +33.9% |
| 1966 | 206 | −13.1% |
| 1971 | 161 | −21.8% |
| 1976 | 148 | −8.1% |
| 1981 | 145 | −2.0% |
| 1986 | 134 | −7.6% |
| 1991 | 122 | −9.0% |
| 1991A | 127 | +4.1% |
| 1996 | 118 | −7.1% |
| 2001 | 106 | −10.2% |
| 2006 | 109 | +2.8% |
| 2011 | 125 | +14.7% |
| 2016 | 115 | −8.0% |
| 2021 | 114 | −0.9% |
Source: Statistics Canada

In the 2021 Census of Population conducted by Statistics Canada, Brownvale had a population of 114 living in 52 of its 59 total private dwellings, a change of −0.9% from its 2016 population of 115. With a land area of 3.06 km^{2} (1.18 sq mi), it had a population density of 37.3/km^{2} (96.5/sq mi) in 2021.

As a designated place in the 2016 Census of Population conducted by Statistics Canada, Brownvale had a population of 115 living in 54 of its 59 total private dwellings, a change of −8% from its 2011 population of 125. With a land area of 3.06 km^{2} (1.18 sq mi), it had a population density of 37.6/km^{2} (97.3/sq mi) in 2016.

== Education ==
Brownvale currently does not have an open school. Previously, Brownvale Elementary School served the community; however, the building is now the hamlet's town hall. This building is now used for recreational events, such as bingo, receptions and a memorial services.

== See also ==
- List of communities in Alberta
- List of designated places in Alberta
- List of hamlets in Alberta
