= Lac Cardinal Recreation Area =

- Interactive map of Lac Cardinal Recreation Area
- Type: Municipal
- Location: Municipal District of Peace No. 135, Alberta, Canada
- Coordinates: 56.217°N 117.698°W
- Operator: Municipal District of Peace No. 135
- Status: Open all year

Lac Cardinal Recreation Area is a municipally owned recreation area located adjacent to the Queen Elizabeth Provincial Park on the eastern shore of Lac Cardinal in Alberta, Canada. It is 5 miles (8.0 km) northwest of the Town of Grimshaw on Township Road 833A off Highway 35. The Town of Peace River is 28 kilometers to the east.

Lac Cardinal Pioneer Village Museum, a living museum depicting the history of the region in the 1920s to 1940s is located in the recreation area.

== Activities ==
The recreation area is equipped with fire pits, a playground area, a camp kitchen, outhouses, and 16 first-come, first-served camping sites. The North Peace Stampede takes place on this venue every year in August. There is also a large hall that which can be rented from the Municipality.
