= Bicentennial Highway =

Bicentennial Highway may refer to:

- Nova Scotia Highway 102
- Alberta Highway 88
- Utah State Route 95
