= Alberta wildfires =

Alberta wildfires may refer to:

- 2011 Slave Lake wildfire
- 2016 Fort McMurray wildfire
- 2019 Alberta wildfires
- 2023 Alberta wildfires
