= Peace River Wilderness Park =

Park in Alberta, Canada

Wilderness Park
- Interactive map of Wilderness Park
- Type: Municipal
- Location: Municipal District of Peace No. 135
- Coordinates: 56.224°N 117.554°W
- Area: 64 hectares (160 acres)
- Operator: Municipal District of Peace No. 135
- Status: Open all year

Wilderness Park is a municipally owned park with a set of two man-made lakes stocked with rainbow trout and interconnected trails. It is located on a quarter section on Range Road 233, approximately 6 kilometres northeast of the town of Grimshaw, north of highway 2A (Roma Drive); or approximately 18 kilometres west of the town of Peace River, south of Highway 2.

== Activities ==
It is a park meant for day-users and has picnic tables, fire pits, and wheelchair-accessible outhouses. There are no garbage receptacles because of the risk of attracting bears. Both lakes are equipped with docks. Firewood is also available. Hiking trails meander through the park, allowing one to view birds and wildlife in their natural habitat. The trails also connect to the Friendship Trail (part of the Trans Canada Trail) that links the towns of Peace River and Grimshaw.

Cross-country skiing is popular on the trails in this location during the winter months.

In the 2010 Alberta Summer Games hosted in the Peace River region, canoe polo took place at Wilderness Park since the Municipal District of Peace No. 135 was a hosting partner. Canoe polo can be described as a combination of water polo, basketball, and kayaking.
