= 2019 Alberta wildfires =

Wildfires in Alberta, Canada

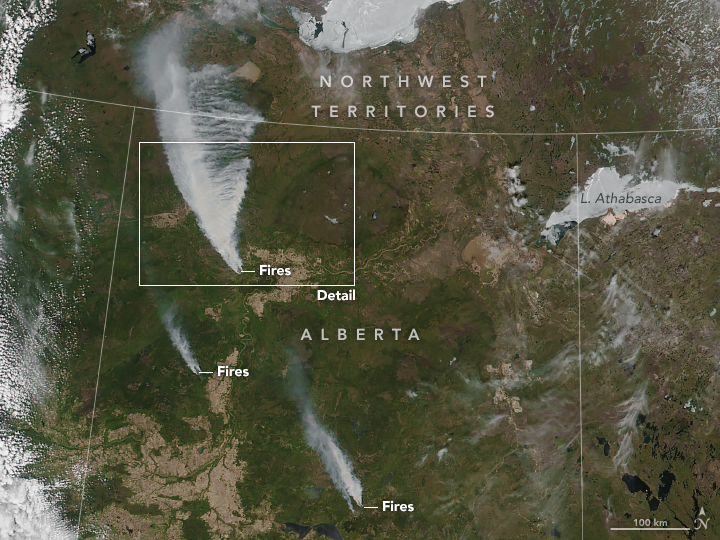
- Satellite photo taken on May 19, 2019, of wildfires ravaging portions of Northern Alberta.
- Date: March 1 – December 23, 2019
- Location: Northern and Central Alberta, Canada

Statistics
- Total fires: 1005
- Burned area: 883,413.70 hectares (2,182,963 acres)

Impacts
- Structures destroyed: 16 and a CN railway bridge.

Ignition
- Cause: Lightning, Human

The 2019 Alberta wildfires have been described by NASA as part of an extreme fire season in the province. In 2019 there were a total of 803,393.32 hectares (1,985,228 acres) burnt, which is over 3.5 times more land area burned than in the five-year average burned. The five year average is 747 fires destroying 146,360.08 hectares (361,664 acres). There were 644 wildfires recorded in Alberta. By May 31, 10,000 people had been evacuated, 16 homes, and the Steen River CN railway bridge, had been destroyed.

The department of Agriculture and Forestry's Forest Protection Division reported that by May 31, there were 29 wildfires still burning with nine out-of-control fires. As of June 20, there are a total of 27 wildfires burning with 6 being considered out of control. Of these, five were caused by humans and two by lightning with 20 still under investigation.

On May 30, NASA reported that the Terra satellite's Moderate Resolution Imaging Spectroradiometer (MODIS) had collected satellite images of five large "hot spots" on May 29. The fire danger level of four of these five areas—the Steen River wildfire HWF066, the Chuckegg Creek wildfire HWF042, the Peace River area, and the Slave Lake area—was extreme. The fifth, at Wood Buffalo National Park was designated as very high.

One fire, described as a fast growing "monster", the Chuckegg Creek Fire HWF042—unofficially known as the High Level fire—had forced the evacuation of 5,000 people in the High Level Forest Area, northern Alberta, and had burned 2,300 km^{2} (570,000 acres) by May 30 and 237,000 hectares by the evening of May 31.

According to Alberta's Department of Agriculture and Forestry (AAF), the Forest Resource Improvement Association of Alberta (FRIAA) FireSmart program, Alberta communities are under an increased risk of forest fires because fifty per cent of Alberta is covered in forests and because of Alberta's wildland–urban interface (WUI) —where many communities are nested into forests with buildings and forested areas intertwined. The province's designated Forest Protection Area stretches from north to south of the province along the western border with British Columbia.

For purposes of monitoring, the Alberta's wildfire status map subdivides the Forest Protection Area into these areas: Calgary, Edson, Fort McMurray area, Grande Prairie, High Level, Lac La Biche, Peace River, Slave Lake, and Whitecourt.

There was smoke from Alberta's wildfires over southern Alberta, southern B.C. Interior and the Lower Mainland, including the city of Vancouver as well as the U.S. Pacific Northwest, reaching as far south as Denver, Colorado. Air quality in cities such as Edmonton and Calgary, reached 10+ out of 10 rating, which is considered to be a severe risk.

== Historical comparison ==
In 2019, there have been 644 wildfires in the Forest Protection Area with a total of 798,380.75 hectares (1,972,842 acres) burned as of June 20. The current 5-year average is 664 wildfires with 146,164.76 hectares (361,181 acres) burned.

== Progression ==
By May 30, in the Forest Protection Area of Alberta, there were 27 wildfires, ten of which that were out of control, 2 were being held, 9 were under control and 6 were "turned over to the responsible parties".

By May 30, with three major wildfires spreading quickly overnight on May 29, there were about 10,000 wildfire evacuees. Thousands more were waiting on evacuation alerts.

The Department of Agriculture and Forestry's Forest Protection Division reported that by May 31, there were 29 wildfires still burning with nine out-of-control fires. Of these, ten were caused by humans and one by lightning with 20 still under investigation. The total number of hectares burned was 496,739.19 or 4,967.4 km^{2} (1,227,500 acres). There were nine fires that were out of control. compared to six on May 27.

By early morning on June 1, the area had increased to 528,842.99 hectare or 5,288.4299 km^{2} (1,306,799.5 acres). increasing to 571,770.49 hectare or 5,717.7 km^{2} (1,412,900 acres) within several hours.

By May 31, 10,000 people had been evacuated, 16 homes, and the Steen River CN railway bridge, had been destroyed.

In terms of the number of wildfires alone, from March 1 to May 30, the number of fires in 2019 was "slightly under the five-year average" but the "amount of land burned is more than 3.5 times higher."

=== Weather conditions ===
In an Edmonton Journal interview in the afternoon of May 30, Alberta Wildfire's information unit lead, Christie Tucker, said that from the evening of May 29 through to late afternoon May 30, multiple wildfires were moving faster than they normally would", "even at night when they wouldn't traditionally be moving so quickly" because of the "ongoing dry windy conditions" with "very low humidity", creating a challenge for firefighters.

Alberta's Minister of Agriculture and Forestry, Devin Dreeshen, said on May 30 that there were nine out-of-control fires. He said that this "fight is going to be a tough one" as the weather was "not co-operating for the long-distance forecast for the next two weeks. It's more of the same, of hot, dry and windy conditions. Albertans need to prepare themselves for this situation for the foreseeable future."

== Edson District ==
In the Edson Forest Area, the wildfire that is officially named EWF043, which was detected on May 29 and has burned 2.05 km^{2} (510 acres), was categorized as out-of-control by May 30, 2019. EWF043, which was moving south west, was about 40 kilometres (25 mi) south east of Edson.

Edson Forest Area
official name	date assessed	location	fire status	cause	area burned
EWF033	May 19, 2019 AM	near Highway 16 south of Marlboro, Alberta; crossed Highway 16	UC (Note: AAF's Forest Protection Division rates the status of wildfires by: OC=Out of Control, BH=Being Held, UC=Under Control, TO=Turned Over, EX=Extinguished, LGT=Lightning, UND INV=Under Investigation, as of Status Date.)	UI	65 ha 0.65 km^{2} (160 acres)
EWF043	May 29, 2019	location	OC	UI	200 ha 2.05 km^{2} (510 acres)

== Fort McMurray District ==
By May 30, the Fort McMurray Forest Area had one fire, MWF012, which is within 10 kilometres (6.2 mi) CNRL Albian, that is expected to be under control by the first week in June. MWF012 had burned 0.106 km^{2} (26 acres) by May 30.

Fort McMurray Forest Area
official name	date	location	fire status	cause	area burned
MWF012	May 30	location	UC	Oil and gas industry	0.106 km^{2} (26 acres)
MWF020	May 30	location	UC	UI	.48 acres

== High Level District ==
In the High Level Forest Area, by May 30, 2019, there were two active and out-of-control (OC) wildfires. The largest is the Chuckegg Creek wildfire, officially named HWF042 which burned 818.27 km^{2} (202,200 acres). The second was the Jackpot Creek Wildfire HWF066 in the Steen River area which had burned 247.3 km^{2} (61,100 acres).

According to the federal Minister of Public Safety Ralph Goodale, on the evening of May 31, the province of Alberta requested assistance with "the massive forest fires" near High Level and Slave Lake. In response the Canadian Armed Forces were mobilized to support evacuations, medical assistance, among other things.

=== Chuckegg Creek wildfire HWF042 ===
The High Level wildfire, officially known as the Chuckegg Creek wildfire HWF042, started on May 12, 2019, due to a lightning strike. At first it burned northwest, reaching a size of 350,000 hectares before its status was changed to Being Held.

On May 17, the wildfire breached containment due to gusty winds from the southeast. The wildfire reached a size of 1,817 hectares by that evening. By May 18, the wildfire had grown to a size of 25,300 hectares. On May 19, the Chuckegg Creek wildfire was about 25 km (16 mi) southwest of High Level, a town with about 4,000 residents. The fire almost tripled in size to 690 km^{2} (69,000 hectares) overnight on May 19. On May 20, with the fire within 5 kilometres (3.1 mi) of the town High Level, a state of local emergency and an evacuation alert were issued. Due to the fire's proximity to High Level, and the dry weather forecasted for the coming days, the town was placed under an evacuation order on May 20 at 4:00 p.m.

By May 28, Global News described it as a "monster." According to Alberta Wildfire's Christie Tucker, between 12:00 noon on May 29 and 4 a.m. on May 30, the Chuckegg Creek fire grew by 80,000 hectares 80 km^{2} (8,000 hectares) to 2,300 km^{2} (230,000 hectares). Tucker said that it was unusual for a wildfire to move so quickly especially at night.

HWF042 spread northwest near Watt Mountain, and south towards Paddle Prairie in the Peace River Forest Area.

The Paddle Prairie Metis Settlement, which is about 72 km (45 mi) south of the High Level on the Mackenzie Highway, had to evacuate without much warning. Fifteen homes in the community were completely destroyed. Concerns were raised about the lack of outside support from structural firefighters. According to Christi Tucker, the heavy smoke made it difficult for outside structural firefighters and structural protection units to fly into the settlement so already present structural firefighters were protecting buildings and infrastructure. Tucker also said that the fire was moving so fast it was hard to get ahead of it.

High Level Forest Area
official name	date	location	fire status	cause	area burned hectares
HWF042 (Chuckegg Creek)*	May 12	High Level, Mackenzie County, Paddle Prairie	EX	Lightning strike	350,134
HWF066 (Jackpot Creek)	May 27	Steen River, Mackenzie County	EX	Unknown	79,834

== Grande Prairie District ==
The Grande Prairie Area was categorized as very high danger of wildfires on May 30, 2019. No large wildfires were reported in the region.

== Lac La Biche District ==
From March to the end of August 2019, there were 142 wildfires in the Lac La Biche Area.

Lac La Biche Area
official name	date	location	fire status	cause	area burned hectares
LWF085	May 12	location	EX	U	21.00
LWF086	May 12	location	EX	U	125.00
LWF087	May 13	location	EX	Forestry industry	23.00
LWF099	May 18	location	EX	Agricultural industry	33.67
LWF107	May 21	location	EX	UI	38.00
LWF123 (Kettle River Fire)	June 16	location	EX	UI	1711.30

== Peace River District ==
The Peace River Forest Area was categorized as in extreme danger of wildfires on May 30, 2019. Of the 70 wildfires in the Peace River Forest Area in 2019, only five fires were still burning. The Battle Complex (Notikewin and Battle River wildfires) known as PWF052 had already burned 52,322 hectares in size in the Notikewin Area remains out-of-control at 52,322 hectares was out of control. In the Battle River area, the 0.7423 km^{2} (183.4 acres) 74.23-hectares PWF054 was under control. Near Keg River, PWF070 2.51 km^{2} (620 acres) had burned 251 hectares. PWF064 burned 0.01 hectares, PWF066 in the Three Creeks area, burned 10.50 hectares.

The High Level Forest Area wildfire, Chuckegg Creek Fire (HWF042), had spread into the Paddle Prairie area in the Peace River Forest Area.

Peace River Forest Area
official name	date	location	fire status	cause	area burned hectares
PWF052*	date	Manning/Notikewin	EX		52,322
PWF054*	date	Manning/Notikewin	EX		74.23
PWF066	May 18	Three Creeks	EX		10.50
PWF070	May 26	Near Keg River	EX	UI	251.00
PCX001 total	date	Manning/Notikewin	EX		52,868.00

- The Battle Complex PCX001-2019 (Notikewin and Battle River wildfires) include PWF052

== Slave Lake District ==
Since March 1, 2019 when the wildfire season began in the Slave Lake Forest Area, 818.27 km^{2} (202,200 acres) were burned and 79 wildfires reported. By May 30 gusty north winds were causing the wildfires in the Slave Lake area to spread.

Wildfires SWF049 which started on May 18 is part of the McMillan Wildfire Complex. It was out of control by May 30 having grown considerably on May 29. It has burned 133,952 hectares.

The Maria Lake wildfire, SWF069, 13.8 kilometres (8.6 mi) southeast of Trout Lake, was classified as out-of-control on May 30 as it had rapidly grown to 45,845 hectares. It joined McMillan wildfire SWF049. By June 1, the out-of-control SWF069 fire covered 58,579 hectares. The community of Trout Lake, which is approximately 500 kilometres (310 mi) was issued an emergency alert by May 27, when the fire was 300 hectares in size. On May 31, the evacuation order was issued for Trout Lake as "early-morning southeast winds pushed" the 211,869-hectare fires—SWF049 and SWF069 (Maria Lake fire)—that make up the McMillan Complex were "rapidly toward the area".

Slave Lake Forest Area
official name	date	location	fire status	cause	area burned hectares
SWF031	May 13	location	TC	UI	0.01
SWF069	May 26	Maria Lake/near Trout Lake	OC	UI	4,845
SWF077	May 30	location	BH	UI	2.60
SWF078	May 30	location	OC	UI	30.00
SWF079	May 30	location	OC	UI	260.00
SWF080	May 30	location	BH	UI	0.30
SWF081	May 31	location	BH	UI	1.70
SCX001 McMillan Complex		Trout Lake, Slave Lake, Peerless Lake	CS		
SWF049*	May 30	location	OC	UI	260.00
SWF050*	May 30	location			0.30
SWF081*	May 31	location			1.70
SCX001 McMillan Complex total	May 31	location	BH	UI	13,409.00
Slave Lake total	May 31	location			18,548.61

- SCX001 McMillan Complex

== Whitecourt District ==
Two of the three wildfires in the Whitecourt Forest Area Wildfire Update, WWF028, which burned 20.30 hectares, and the 3.60 hectares WWF033, were under control. The third wildfire, WWF032 is northeast of the Sakwatamau River had already burned 51.9 hectares by May 28, 2019, and was out of control. There were firefighters, airtankers and heavy equipment working to control it.

Whitecourt Forest Area
official name	date	location	fire status	cause	area burned hectares
WWF028	May 21	location	UC	UI	20.30
WWF032	May 28	location	OC	UI	51.90
WWF033	May 28	location	UC	UI	3.60
Whitecourt area total	May 28	location	OC	UI	75.80

== Evacuations ==
Voluntary evacuation alerts were issued for High Level and the immediate surrounding area on May 19, followed by evacuation orders issued for High Level and Bushe River Reserve on May 20, as a result of the Chuckegg Creek Fire. The community of Steen River was evacuated on May 28. On May 29, further evacuation orders for certain areas such as the La Crete Ferry Campground, Mackenzie County east of the Peace River, County of Northern Lights north of Manning, Paddle Prairie Metis Settlement and the Twin Lakes campground. Later in the day, more evacuation orders were issued for the Hamlet of Wabasca, and Bigstone Cree Nation. The following day, the Hamlet of Sandy Lake was placed under an evacuation order.

By May 30, 5,000 High Level area residents were still unable to return home.

On May 30, a new wildfire forced the evacuation of the Chipewyan Lake Village, which is 130 kilometres (81 mi) west of Fort McMurray.

The Municipal Affairs Minister Kaycee Madu said that by May 29 there were 9,500 people who had already been evacuated. Additional evacuation orders had been issued on May 30. Madu announced that financial assistance of over 6 million was processed and over 6,200 people had already applied for relief payments. Two days later, on May 31, Global News reported that over 10,000 people had been evacuated and that 16 homes had been destroyed.

On June 3, the evacuation orders for High Level and Bushe River were lifted. The evacuation orders in place for Wabasca and Bigstone Cree Nation were lifted on June 11.

On June 17, a new evacuation order was put in place for the hamlet of La Crete, and an evacuation alert was issued for High Level. Evacuation orders were also issued for the settlement of Indian Cabins, Trout Lake and Peerless Lake the following day.

== Buildings and structures destroyed ==
In the Paddle Prairie Métis Settlement in the High Level Forest Area, 11 homes were destroyed by May 30.

The Steen River CN Rail bridge was destroyed by the Steen River wildfire HWF066 on May 29.

== Smoke ==
Edmonton Downtown covered by blanket of smoke

By May 30, NASA reported that with high north-northwest winds, the Chuckegg Creek Fire HWF042 was quickly growing "in a south to southeast direction" and the massive smoke from the fire has reduced visibility and resulted in Environment Canada, Alberta Environment and Parks, Alberta Health and Alberta Health Services issuing air quality warnings with the index reaching dangerous levels in some areas.

The government of the Yukon Territory issued a smoke advisory for Watson Lake on May 21 and by May 23 the smoke plume had reached Dawson City. By the end of May there were already eighteen wildfires in Yukon but these fires were not responsible for the smoke.

By the early morning of May 30, Alberta Air Quality Health Index had rated the air quality in the Edmonton metro region at 7 out of 10, which is high risk and 5 out of 10 later in the morning. Environment Canada issued a special air quality statement for Edmonton, St. Albert and Sherwood Park.

By May 30, smoke from Alberta's forest fires had reached as far south as Denver, Colorado. In some cities, such as Minneapolis and Milwaukee in Minnesota, Chicago, Illinois, Detroit, Michigan and Kansas City, Missouri the "sun was obscured by smoke" from Alberta's wildfires, according to the National Weather Service's Twin Cities Branch. By May 31 the smoke plume had reached Montana, North Dakota, South Dakota, Washington and Wyoming. Three cities in Montana had air quality warnings.

By the early evening of May 30 Calgary's air quality was rated as 8 out of 10, which is high risk.

By the morning of May 31, the Air Quality Health Index for Calgary was registered at 10+ which is a very high risk.

By May 28, smoke had flowed to southern Alberta, southern B.C. Interior, to the Lower Mainland, including "Metro Vancouver and much of the U.S. Pacific Northwest".

=== Aerosols ===
According to NASA, aerosols have been "growing more dense" in the area affected by the smoke from Chuckegg Creek fire with particulates rising into the atmosphere. By May 23, NASA had published an "image of the aerosols stretching from Alaska to the Atlantic". May 23 images captured by the Suomi NPP satellite's Ozone Mapping and Profiler Suite (OMPS) sensor and the Visible and Infrared Imaging Sensor (VIIRS) showed that aerosol levels Chuckegg Creek fire near High Level showed "medium to high level amounts of pollution, particulates in the form of smoke, dust, and ash". The "higher levels of smoke coincide with the areas of red on the aerosols image and the areas where the smoke is less dense coincide with the lighter yellow areas of the aerosols image as would be expected."

=== Fire Radiative Power (FRP) ===
According to Copernicus Atmosphere Monitoring Service (CAMS)'s (Note: Copernicus Atmosphere Monitoring Service (CAMS) monitors atmospheric composition as part of the European Union's Copernicus Programme.) senior scientist, Mark Parrington, the 2019 Alberta wildfires's Fire Radiative Power (FRP) up to May 29, placed fifth in the list of the "most intense annual FRP totals since 2003."

== Causes ==
By May 30, the cause of 20 fires was still under investigation (UI). One was caused by lightning and 10 were caused by humans. It was later reported that 71% of the 2019 Alberta Wildfires were human-caused.

== Climate change ==
University of Alberta professor Mike Flannigan, said the extended wildfire season, which used to start April 1 and now officially starts on March 1, and that he and his colleagues "attribute that to human-caused climate change." The Calgary Herald reported that because of climate change, in the coming years, the prairie provinces would "see a longer fire season, more frequent wildfires, heat and drought.”

== Fire-fighting ==
By the evening of May 30, there were 600 firefighters in Alberta and more on the way, from other provinces, including British Columbia, Ontario, Quebec, New Brunswick, Nova Scotia, Northwest Territories, and Prince Edward Island.

The managing director of Alberta Emergency Management Agency, Shane Schreiber, said in a May 30 interview that the government had raised the Emergency Operations Center to level four. Level four means that all provincial government departments as well as federal departments such as the Department of National Defence and Public Safety Canada, Indigenous Services Canada, some industrial organizations such as CN Rail, and NGOs are helping to coordinate support. Schreiber said that by May 30 approximately "200 structural firefighters and structural protection units" arrived in the affected areas from Albertan communities to protect buildings and infrastructure.

By May 31, across northern Alberta, there were 737 people working in 61 wildland Firefighting Crews (WFC) with 6 Airtankers (A/T), 11 Rotor Wing Lights (LIT), 38 Rotor Wing Intermediates (INT), 63 Rotor Wing Mediums (MED), 10 Water Trucks (WT), 44 Dozers (DZ), and 3 Skidders (SKD) fighting the fires. (Note: AAF's Forest Protection Division lists firefighting resources as Wildland Firefighting Crew (WFC), Airtanker (A/T), Rotor Wing Light (LIT), Rotor Wing Intermediate (INT), Rotor Wing Medium (MED), Water Truck (WT), Dozer (DZ), Bus (BUS), and Skidder (SKD))

On May 31, Alberta requested assistance from the federal government with the huge forest fires that threatened High Level and Slave Lake. The Canadian Armed Forces will help support evacuations, including airlifting evacuees, transporting supplies and providing medical assistance, among other things.

== Agencies ==
The Department of Agriculture and Forestry (AAF), is responsible for "fire bans, FireSmart, wildfire compliance and enforcement, wildfire maps and data, wildfire operations, wildfire prevention, and wildfire status". Devin Dreeshen was named as AAF minister on April 30, 2019, by the newly elected Alberta Premier, Jason Kenney.

At the provincial level, the Emergency response and recovery is responsible for "emergency and disaster response, recovery, legislation and supports". The Alberta Emergency Management Agency (AEMA) is responsible for "fire reporting, and search and rescue".

The Forest Resource Improvement Association of Alberta (FRIAA) FireSmart program which operates under the AAF department, reported that Alberta communities are under an increased risk of forest fires because fifty percent of Alberta is covered in forests. Alberta's wildland–urban interface means that in many communities buildings and forested areas intertwine. The province's designated Forest Protection Area stretches from north to south of the province along the western border with British Columbia.

As of 2017, Alberta's designated Forest Protection Area stretched from north to south of the province along the western border with British Columbia.

At the federal level, Natural Resources Canada on May 30, announced a $500,000 grant to the Canmore-based Rockies Institute, to develop a "multi-partner, multi-year" "wildfire resilience project" called "Fire With Fire". The Rockies Institute plan to build on a "pilot project undertaken with the Kainai Nation in southern Alberta. In the fall of 2018, the Institute submitted their project for funding under the federal government's Building Regional Adaption Capacity and Expertise (BRACE) program, which is "under the umbrella of the federal government's $18 million strategic investment program—Adaptation and Climate Resilience. The collaborative approach uses scientific knowledge of fire management that includes the best practices based on scientific knowledge which incorporates "Indigenous scientific knowledge of fire management" "for local, regional and provincial climate change adaptations." For example, indigenous communities, that have for many years managed used the methodology of "prescribed", "deliberately set" smaller burns at different times of the year. Australia has incorporated this methodology since at least 1999.

== See also ==
- List of disasters in Canada
- List of fires in Canada
- Boreal forest of Canada
- 2016 Fort McMurray wildfire
- 2018 British Columbia wildfires
- 2023 Alberta wildfires
