= Alberta Highway 88 =

Highway in Alberta, Canada

Highway 88
- Bicentennial Highway
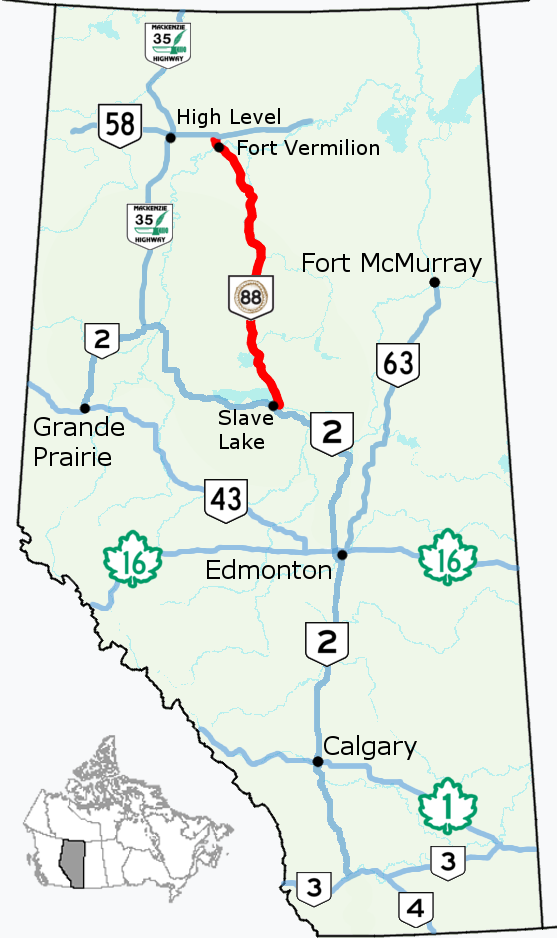
- Highway 88 highlighted in red

Route information
- Maintained by the Ministry of Transportation and Economic Corridors
- Length: 428.4 km (266.2 mi)

Major junctions
- South end: Highway 2 in Slave Lake
- Highway 986 near Red Earth Creek; Highway 697 in Fort Vermilion
- North end: Highway 58 near Fort Vermilion

Location
- Country: Canada
- Province: Alberta
- Specialized and rural municipalities: Lesser Slave River No. 124 M.D., Northern Sunrise County, Opportunity No. 17 M.D., Mackenzie County
- Towns: Slave Lake

Highway system
- Alberta Provincial Highway Network; List; Former
← Highway 72	→ Highway 93

Highway 88, officially named the Bicentennial Highway, is a north–south highway in Northern Alberta.

Highway 88 begins at its intersection with Highway 2 at the Town of Slave Lake, passing through Red Earth Creek and Fort Vermilion and ending at Highway 58 approximately 57 km (35 mi) east of the Town of High Level. It crosses the Peace River approximately 13 km (8.1 mi) south of Highway 58. The total length of the highway is 428 km (266 mi).

== History ==
Highway 88 was originally numbered as Highway 67. It was renumbered to Highway 88 and labeled as Bicentennial Highway in 1988 in celebration of 200 years of history of Fort Vermilion – one of two communities that claim to be the first European settlement in Alberta (the other being Fort Chipewyan on Lake Athabasca to the east).

== Major intersections ==
From south to north:

Rural/specialized municipality	Location	km	mi	Destinations	Notes
M.D. of Lesser Slave River No. 124	Slave Lake	0	0.0	Highway 2 – High Prairie, Peace River, Edmonton	Southern terminus
M.D. of Opportunity No. 17		34	21	Highway 754 east – Wabasca-Desmarais	
Northern Sunrise County		111	69	Highway 750 south – Atikameg, High Prairie	
Northern Sunrise County		159	99	Highway 986 west – Little Buffalo, Peace River	
M.D. of Opportunity No. 17	Red Earth Creek	169	105	Highway 686 east – Peerless Lake, Trout Lake	
Mackenzie County	Fort Vermilion	408	254	50 Street	
Mackenzie County		412	256	Highway 697 west – La Crete	
Mackenzie County		414	257	Crosses the Peace River	
Mackenzie County		430	270	Highway 58 – High Level, John D'Or Prairie	Northern terminus
1.000 mi = 1.609 km; 1.000 km = 0.621 mi
