= Strong Creek Park =

Park in Alberta, Canada

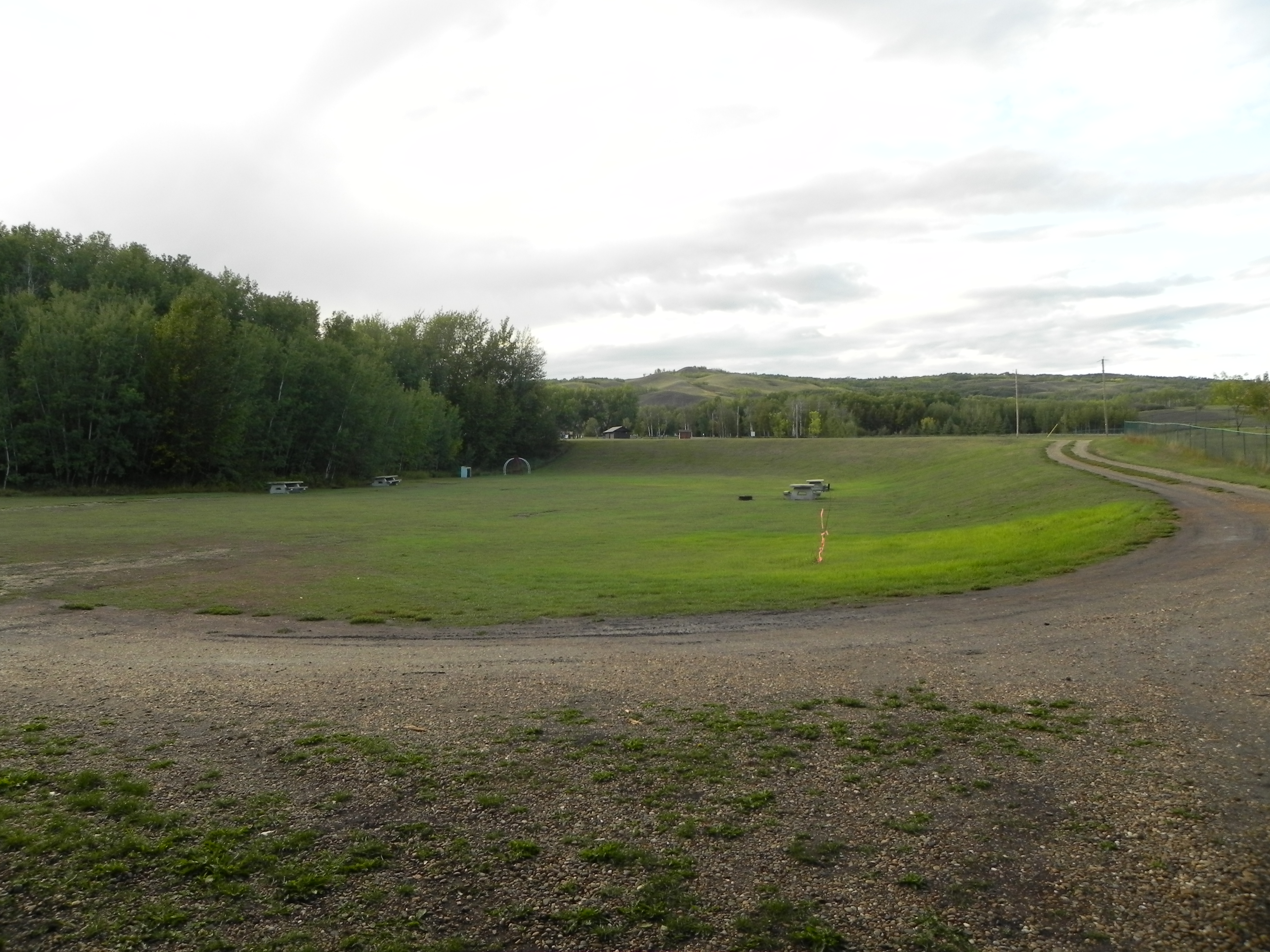
- Strong Creek Park
- Interactive map of Strong Creek Park
- Location: Municipal District of Peace No. 135, Alberta, Canada
- Nearest city: Peace River
- Coordinates: 56°09′44″N 117°25′17″W
- Governing body: Municipal District of Peace No. 135

Strong Creek Park is a municipal park located on the Peace River mouth of Strong Creek, 8 km (5.0 mi) south of the Town of Peace River, Alberta on Shaftesbury Trail (Highway 684).

== Activities ==
The park features a contoured large day use area, playground, fire pits, camping sites (no power hookups or showers), outhouses and drinking water. Strong Creek Park has a boat launch on to the Peace River and a small sandy beach. It is a site of the annual Paddle the Peace event organized by surrounding municipalities.
