= Marco Marra =

Canadian geneticist

Marco Marra OC OBC
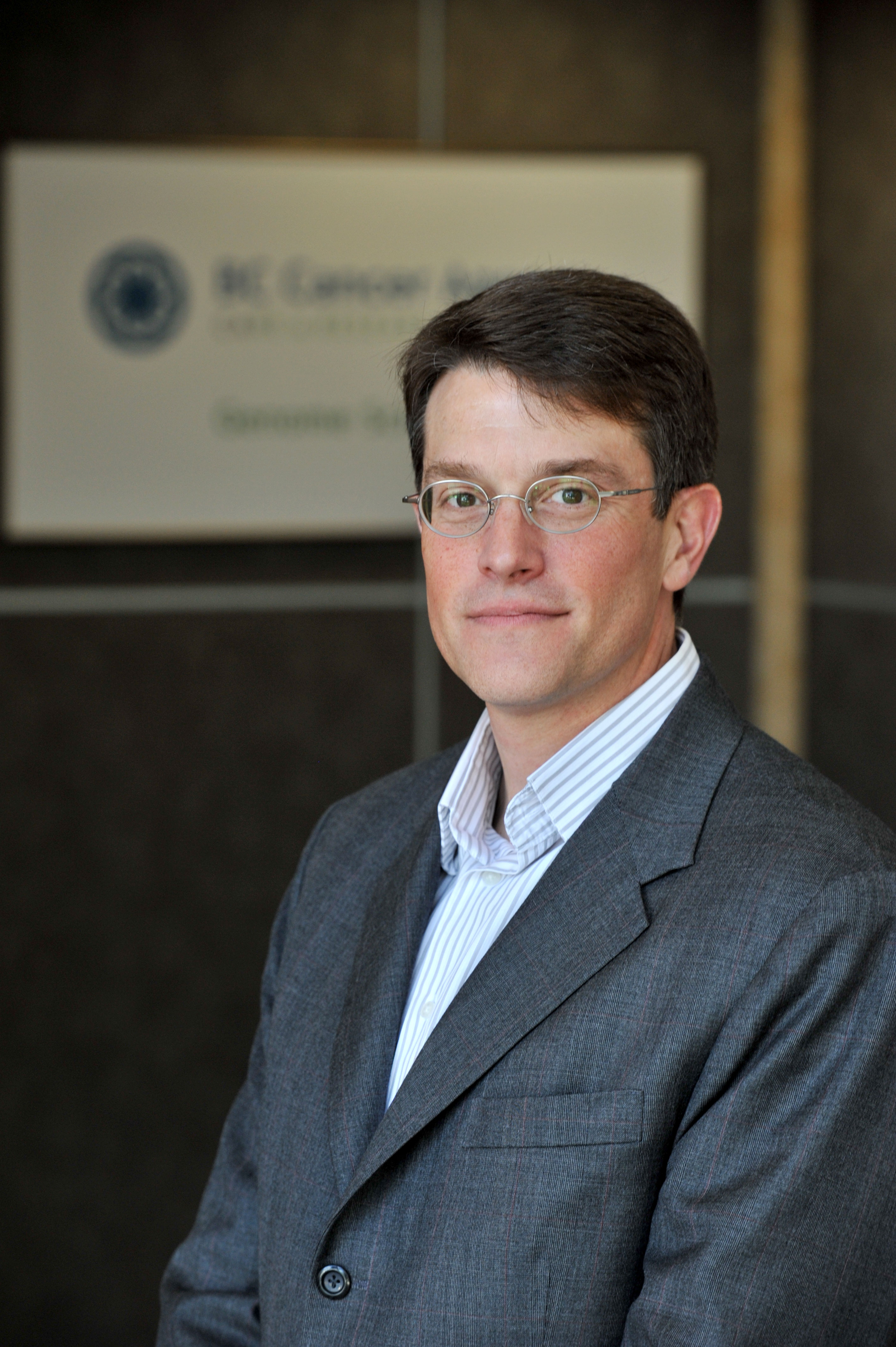
- Born: June 30, 1966 (age 60); Berwyn, Alberta, Canada
- Citizenship: Canadian
- Education: Simon Fraser University
- Known for: Genomics; cancer genome science; SARS coronavirus sequencing; personalized oncogenomics
- Awards: Killam Prize (2025); Officer of the Order of Canada (2024); Canadian Medical Hall of Fame (2020); Fellow, Royal Society of Canada (2007); Fellow, Canadian Academy of Health Sciences (2009); Order of British Columbia (2010)

Marco Antonio Marra is a Canadian scientist and researcher who helped develop the field of genomics. He is a Professor of Medical Genetics and of the Michael Smith Laboratories at the University of British Columbia (UBC) and served for 22 years as Director of Canada’s Michael Smith Genome Sciences Centre (GSC) at BC Cancer in Vancouver. He also serves as UBC Canada Research Chair in Genome Science for the Canadian Institutes of Health Research and is an inductee in the Canadian Medical Hall of Fame.

Marra's research has contributed to advances in genome science, cancer genomics and precision cancer medicine. He is also a professor in UBC's Michael Smith Laboratories. He has authored more than 564 peer-reviewed research papers, which have been cited more than 294,984 times with an h-index of 199 according to Google Scholar, and he has served as principal or co-principal investigator on research funding exceeding $500 million. In 2025 he received the National Killam Prize in Health Sciences and was named a UBC University Killam Professor.

== Education and early career ==
Canadian born and educated, Marco Marra received a B.Sc. in molecular & cell biology and a PhD in genetics from Simon Fraser University. The title of his PhD thesis: "Genome analysis in Caenorhabditis elegans: Genetic and molecular identification of genes tightly linked to unc-22(IV)".

Returning to Vancouver to work alongside Nobel laureate Michael Smith, he became associate director and co-founder of the BC Cancer Agency Genome Sequence Centre, which later became the Michael Smith Genome Sciences Centre. After a short time as co-director he became director, overseeing the centre's growth from a small laboratory to an institution of more than 350 scientists, technical staff and trainees.

== Research ==
=== Genome mapping and sequencing ===
Marra developed fingerprinting methods for analyzing large-insert cloned DNA segments. Working with collaborators, he applied these techniques to construct comprehensive genome maps to fuel genome sequencing. Along with GSC co-director Steven J.M. Jones, Marra was involved in "A physical map of the human genome", which describes the construction and use of the human genome map to fuel human genome sequencing. His fingerprinting approach was instrumental in organizing the international Human Genome Project, where the use of clone fingerprints to coordinate and fuel the public consortium's sequencing efforts distinguished it from parallel efforts. Using these methods, Marra's team generated over 5 million fingerprints for 63 different species, enabling genome sequencing beyond that of the human, including key biomedical, agricultural and industrial model organisms such as the mouse, the rat and Arabidopsis.

=== SARS coronavirus sequencing ===
In 2003, when severe acute respiratory syndrome (SARS) emerged as a global health threat, Marra led the group that first sequenced the SARS coronavirus genome. The work was completed in approximately six days after receipt of a sample from Canada's National Microbiology Laboratory in Winnipeg, and was recognized as a significant achievement in rapid viral genomics that contributed to understanding the etiology of the disease. The rapid sequencing demonstrated that this approach could serve as a tool to identify emerging infectious diseases and stimulated the rapid production of a vaccine by the SARS Accelerated Vaccine Initiative (SAVI) in British Columbia. Later work from the centre identified an alternative procedure for extracting nucleic acids for COVID-19 testing.

=== Next-generation sequencing methods ===
Marra's group was among the first international centres to receive Solexa next-generation sequencing instruments, in 2006, and contributed to developing protocols and analysis methods for the new technology. The group developed approaches for profiling small RNAs, including microRNAs, and for analyzing messenger RNA expression using massively parallel sequencing methods. The team also created widely used bioinformatics tools, including the Circos software, which became a standard visualization platform across genomics research and has appeared in numerous scientific publications and news media.

=== Precision cancer genomic medicine and cancer genomics ===
Shortly after the 2008 publication of the first cancer whole genome sequence, from a patient with acute myeloid leukemia, Marra and colleague Samuel Aparicio at UBC and BC Cancer were the first to sequence the whole genome of a solid cancer, from a breast cancer patient, identifying cancer-specific genetic mutations. In a 2010 study, as part of a GSC initiative, Marra's group demonstrated proof-of-concept for using whole genome and transcriptome sequencing to identify a cryptic cancer cell vulnerability and to apply a drug to exploit it, aligning an individual patient's genome profile with an off-label drug therapy. This work catalyzed the development of British Columbia's Personalized OncoGenomics (POG) program, which Marra currently co-leads with medical oncologist Dr. Janessa Laskin.

The POG program has enrolled thousands of cancer patients, using a comprehensive approach to precision cancer medicine that combines whole genome and transcriptome analysis with clinical data to search for personalized cancer treatments. Through this initiative, Marra's research has demonstrated the potential for cancer genome science to directly influence treatment selection and patient outcomes.

In addition to his work in precision cancer genomic medicine, Marra's cancer genomics research has identified recurrent mutations in many cancer types, including recurrently mutated genes. His work in B-cell lymphomas, including the identification of EZH2 mutations in follicular and diffuse large B-cell lymphomas and frequent mutation of histone-modifying genes in non-Hodgkin lymphoma, led to rationales for targeted therapeutic approaches and revealed epigenome dysregulation as a dominant feature of these cancers. Other work extended these approaches to pediatric cancers, demonstrating previously unrecognized molecular heterogeneity in childhood malignancies.

== Contributions to graduate education and training ==
Marra co-founded and co-directed the Genome Sciences and Technology Graduate Program at UBC and was a founding member of UBC's Bioinformatics Program, which together established British Columbia as a centre for advanced genomics and bioinformatics training.

== Leadership roles ==
Marra has provided testimony to the Standing Committee on Health of Canada's House of Commons, co-chaired the Council of Expert Advisors to the Government of Canada on the biomanufacturing, biopharmaceuticals and life sciences sectors, and is currently co-chair of the Life Sciences Expert Advisory Council, which advises the Government of Canada on how to strengthen Canada's biomanufacturing and life sciences sectors, particularly where health and economic security overlap. Marra is involved in the Terry Fox Research Institute's Marathon of Hope Cancer Centres Network (MOHCCN), a national program to advance precision cancer genomic medicine across Canada.

== Awards and honors ==
- Canadian Cancer Society Lifetime Contribution Prize (2025)
- National Killam Prize in Health Sciences (2025)
- UBC University Killam Professor (2025)
- Officer of the Order of Canada (2024)
- Canadian Medical Hall of Fame (2020)
- Don Rix Lifetime Achievement Award, Life Sciences BC (2019)
- Outstanding Achievements in Cancer Research Award (2017)
- Chew Wei Memorial Prize in Cancer Research (2015)
- Terry Fox Medal (2010)
- Order of British Columbia (2010)
- Fellow of the Canadian Academy of Health Sciences (2009)
- Fellow of the Royal Society of Canada (2007)
- Merck Frosst Prize (2007)
- Honorary Doctor of Philosophy, University of Calgary (2005)
- Honorary Doctor of Science, Simon Fraser University (2004)
