= Gloria Chomiak Atamanenko =

American social worker

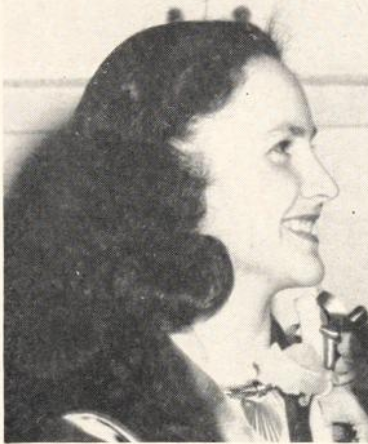
- Chomiak from a 1950 publication of the U.S. Department of the Interior
- Born: Gloria Katherine Chomiak; April 28, 1932; Fort Vermilion, Alberta, Canada
- Died: October 12, 2017 (aged 85); Williams Lake, British Columbia, Canada
- Occupations: Social worker, writer, translator, editor

Gloria Katherine Chomiak Atamanenko (April 28, 1932 – October 12, 2017) was a Canadian social worker, writer, editor, and translator. As a teenager in the United States, she made headlines as the winner of a national essay contest on the theme "I Speak for Democracy".

== Early life and education ==
Gloria Chomiak was born in Fort Vermilion, Alberta, the daughter of Peter Chomiak and Nellie Pikulik Chomiak. Her parents were farmers, both Ukrainian-born immigrants to Canada, and her first language was Ukrainian. She was educated at home and through correspondence courses until age 15, when she attended a high school in Wilmington, Delaware, and lived with her uncle there.

In 1950, Chomiak won a $500 scholarship as one of four national finalists in an "I Speak for Democracy" essay contest, selected from over a million entries. Her essay, which began "I speak for democracy, because two generations back my ancestors could not", was read into the Congressional Record by Senator John J. Williams, who commented that "This essay should be read not only by every student but more important, it should be read by every adult in this country." Her essay was reprinted in newspapers across the United States, and she met Harry S. Truman, Alben W. Barkley and Senator J. Allen Frear Jr. The Voice of America invited her to read a translation of her essay in Ukrainian, for a special broadcast. An episode of the radio program Cavalcade of America dramatized her story, with Peggy Ann Garner originally cast as Chomiak. Susan Douglas played the role instead, and Chomiak read her essay aloud during the national live broadcast. She also read the essay at a Daughters of the American Revolution conference, and at church events.

Chomiak graduated from Swarthmore College in 1955. She earned a master's degree in counseling and psychology from the University of Victoria in 1980, with a thesis titled "Family Relationships and Creativity-related Personality Factors: Perspectives from Three Literatures" (1980).

== Career ==
Atamanenko was a psychiatric social worker in Williams Lake, British Columbia, Edmonton, and Vancouver. In 1998 she was honored by the Learning Disabilities Association of British Columbia, for her work for disabled children and adults. She was also a writer and translator; she wrote essays for Lived Experience, a Canadian literary annual, and translated Mykhailo Mikolajovich Ivanychuk's Fourteen Months on Franz Joseph Land (1934) from Russian and Ukrainian into English. She co-edited a collection of biographical essays, Gumption Grit: Women of the Cariboo Chilcotin (2009, with Karen Thompson, Pam Mahon, and Sage Birchwater). She also helped compile a collection of local elders' writings, as Looking Back, Looking Forward: Cariboo Seniors' Stories and Poems (2002). She was active in adult education and in NDP politics in the Cariboo-Chilcotin constituency.

== Personal life ==
Gloria Chomiak married George Atamanenko in 1953. They had two sons, Boris and Peter. She survived a stroke in 2006 and used a wheelchair in her later years. She died in 2017, aged 85 years, in Williams Lake.
