= Cardinal Lake =

Lake in Alberta, Canada

Lac Cardinal
- Location within Alberta
- Location: Municipal District of Peace No. 135 / County of Northern Lights, northwest Alberta
- Coordinates: 56°14′08″N 117°43′32″W
- Primary outflows: Whitemud River
- Basin countries: Canada
- Surface area: 50 km^{2} (19 sq mi)

Lac Cardinal is a lake in northwestern Alberta, Canada. It is located at the southern limit of Mackenzie Highway, near Grimshaw.

Lac Cardinal has a total area of 50 km^{2}. Its waters are drained through the Whitemud River into the Peace River.

Queen Elizabeth Provincial Park is located on the south eastern shore of the lake. The town of Grimshaw is located south from the lake. The communities of Berwyn, Warrensville and Last Lake are also located around Lac Cardinal.
