= Indian Cabins =

Unincorporated community in Alberta, Canada

Coordinates: 59°52′03″N 117°02′05″W

Location of Indian Cabins Alberta

Indian Cabins is an unincorporated community in far northern Alberta in Mackenzie County, located on Highway 35 and the Hay River, 150 km (93 mi) north of High Level, and 15 km (9.3 mi) south of the Northwest Territories-Alberta border. It is the northernmost community in Alberta. In 2023, Indian Cabins had to evacuate due to a wildfire close to the region.

== Gas station ==
Most people stopped here for gas at the Indian Cabins Trading Post, however, in early 2019, its tanks were no longer certified, resulting in the closure of the gas station. With the closure of the Enterprise gas station a few weeks before, there was a 335 km (208 mi) gap in gas stations on the Mackenzie Highway. However, a fuel system was introduced sometime in winter 2020 back to the Indian Cabins Trading Post. Other than the gas station and convenience store, there are a few trailers in the community.

== Geography ==
The land around Indian Cabins is heavily populated with dense northern Boreal Forest and many lakes and ponds. Wood Buffalo National Park, which is Canada's largest national park, is just east of the area.

=== Climate ===
Indian Cabins experiences freezing winters with heavy snow, and hot, sunny summers. Wildfire risk is high during the late spring and through summer due to the dry climate.

== Wildlife ==
Due to the wooded, isolated nature of the community, wildlife such as caribou, moose, wood bison, red fox, beaver, and American black bear are frequently spotted. Rarer sightings include predators such as Canada lynx, mountain lion, grizzly bear, wolverine and grey wolf.

== Outdoor recreation ==
The area in and around Indian Cabins provides numerous outdoor activities, with fishing, canoeing, swimming and hiking being popular in the spring and summer. Pond hockey and ice fishing are also popular due to the numerous frozen lakes and ponds during winter. Northern lights are occasionally sighted at this time.
