= Dixonville, Alberta =

Dixonville
- Hamlet
- Location of Dixonville in Alberta
- Coordinates: 56.5372°N 117.6708°W
- Country: Canada
- Province: Alberta
- Census division: No. 17
- Municipal district: County of Northern Lights

Government
  - Type: Unincorporated
  - Governing body: County of Northern Lights Council

Area (2021)
  - Land: 0.64 km^{2} (0.25 sq mi)
- Elevation: 640 m (2,100 ft)

Population (2021)
  - Total: 96
  - Density: 150.7/km^{2} (390/sq mi)
- Time zone: UTC−06:00 (Alberta Time)

Dixonville is a hamlet in Alberta, Canada within the County of Northern Lights. It is located along the Mackenzie Highway (Highway 35), approximately 43 kilometres (27 mi) north of Grimshaw. It has an elevation of 640 metres (2,100 ft).

The hamlet is located in Census Division No. 17 and in the federal riding of Peace River.

== Demographics ==
Population history of Dixonville
Year	Pop.	±%
1951	62	—
1956	39	−37.1%
1961	104	+166.7%
1966	86	−17.3%
1971	113	+31.4%
1976	56	−50.4%
1981	62	+10.7%
1986	90	+45.2%
1991	89	−1.1%
1996	73	−18.0%
2001	97	+32.9%
2006	121	+24.7%
2011	104	−14.0%
2016	108	+3.8%
2021	96	−11.1%
Source: Statistics Canada

In the 2021 Census of Population conducted by Statistics Canada, Dixonville had a population of 96 living in 38 of its 47 total private dwellings, a change of −11.1% from its 2016 population of 108. With a land area of 0.64 km^{2} (0.25 sq mi), it had a population density of 150.0/km^{2} (388.5/sq mi) in 2021.

As a designated place in the 2016 Census of Population conducted by Statistics Canada, Dixonville had a population of 108 living in 37 of its 45 total private dwellings, a change of 3.8% from its 2011 population of 104. With a land area of 0.65 km^{2} (0.25 sq mi), it had a population density of 166.2/km^{2} (430.3/sq mi) in 2016.

== See also ==
- List of communities in Alberta
- List of designated places in Alberta
- List of hamlets in Alberta
