= Wanyandie Flats, Alberta =

Coordinates: 54.07708°N 118.88423°W

Location of Wanyandie Flats in Alberta

Wanyandie Flats is a settlement in northern Alberta, Canada, within the Municipal District of Greenview No. 16. While not regulated under the Métis Settlements Act and not considered Reserve land, Wanyandie Flats hosts several Métis co-ops and enterprises which were established in 1974 through the Cooperative Association Act. Through these agreements, seven parcels of land totalling 4,150 acres (16.8 km^{2}) were allocated to the communities. Each co-op and enterprise is governed by its own President or Board Manager. The co-ops and enterprises are:

- Joachim Enterprise
- Kamisak (Grande Cache Lake) Enterprise
- Muskeg See Pee Cooperative
- Susa Creek Cooperative
- Victor Lake Cooperative
- Wanyandie Flats East Cooperative
- Wanyandie Flats West Cooperative

The Alberta government filed amendments after 1974 which prevent the sale or development of these lands without government approval, and which force the land to be held communally without ownership or mortgage by individuals.

Most people who live in the co-ops and enterprises are descendants of mixed Indigenous descent including Cree, Iroquois, Sekani, Dene, Ojibwe, Assiniboine, and Shuswap people. Indigenous people have lived in the Grande Cache area for around 10,000 years. The Nation's community members were forcibly displaced during the creation of Jasper National Park, and then displaced twice more in 1912 and 1939 for coal-mining operations in the Grande Cache area. No compensation was given to the community for the land stolen to create the national park, townsites, or the industrial operations. The Nation remains unrecognized by all levels of government today, though it has filed several claims to the provincial and federal governments to assert their rights, land-claims, and compensation owed. Today, around 70% of the Aseniwuche Winewak Nation's members live in the co-ops or enterprises.

In January 2021 a new special claims assessment process was begun by legal counsel on behalf of the Nation, after a 2018 consultation process was abruptly ended by representatives from the federal government with little explanation provided.

The settlements are located near the Bighorn Highway (Highway 40), approximately 40 kilometres (25 mi) north of Grande Cache. They have an elevation of 885 metres (2,904 ft).

Wanyandie Creek flows north into the Smoky River.

== See also ==
- List of communities in Alberta
- List of settlements in Alberta
