= Lac Cardinal Pioneer Village Museum =

Building in Alberta, Canada

Coordinates: 56.2125°N 117.7011°W

Lac Cardinal Regional Pioneer Village Museum
- Established: 1988
- Location: Grimshaw, Alberta, Canada
- Type: open-air, living history

The Lac Cardinal Regional Pioneer Village Museum was developed by the Grimshaw and District Museum Society which was founded in 1988. In 1992 the society clarified its vision of the museum and was reincorporated as the Lac Cardinal Regional Pioneer Village Museum Society, which continues to operate the museum today.

The site is located on 14 acres of land leased from the Municipal District of Peace 135, and is contained within the Lac Cardinal Recreation Area. Its legal land description is NE 22-83-24-W5. It is bordered by the recreation area, by Queen Elizabeth Provincial Park, and by farmland.

The museum features three homes, a hall, municipal office, school, barn, pole sheds, church, blacksmith shop, railway station, barbershop, general store and bakery, all furnished, depict pioneering life in Northern Alberta Peace region. Admission is by donation.

The church in the museum is available during the summer for weddings and the hall for family or group activities.

The museum is open from the May long weekend through Labour Day Monday from 10:30 a.m. to 4:30 p.m. It is run by volunteers.

== Events ==
Annual Pioneer Day held on the 2nd Saturday in August includes: pancake breakfast, beef on a bun, pies, demonstrations of sawmill, shingle mill, planer, threshing, horse and wagon rides, children's races and musical entertainment.

In October, the museum gives itself over to monsters and ghosts when, in partnership with Lac Cardinal Regional Performing Arts Society and Grimshaw Community Services, the site becomes a Haunted Village for Halloween.

An old-fashioned Christmas is held in December with a wiener roast, hot chocolate, and cookies. Activities include a sliding hill for the children and making of ornaments and tree decorating in the school. A church service, musical entertainment, and horse and sleigh rides are provided. All events weather permitting.
