= Flyingshot Lake, Alberta =

Flyingshot Lake
- Unincorporated community
- Location of Flyingshot Lake in Alberta
- Coordinates: 55.140°N 118.864°W
- Country: Canada
- Province: Alberta
- Municipal district: County of Grande Prairie No. 1

Area (2021)
  - Land: 7.29 km^{2} (2.81 sq mi)

Population (2021)
  - Total: 237
  - Density: 32.5/km^{2} (84/sq mi)
- Time zone: UTC−06:00 (Alberta Time)

Flyingshot Lake, or Flyingshot Lake Settlement, is an unincorporated community in Alberta, Canada within the County of Grande Prairie No. 1 that is recognized as a designated place by Statistics Canada. It is located approximately 2.4 km (1.5 mi) west of Highway 40, and 3.2 km (2.0 mi) south of Highway 43. It surrounds a lake of the same name, and is adjacent to the City of Grande Prairie to the northeast.

== Demographics ==
In the 2021 Census of Population conducted by Statistics Canada, Flyingshot Lake had a population of 237 living in 88 of its 106 total private dwellings, a change of −11.9% from its 2016 population of 269. With a land area of 7.29 km^{2} (2.81 sq mi), it had a population density of 32.5/km^{2} (84.2/sq mi) in 2021.

As a designated place in the 2016 Census of Population conducted by Statistics Canada, Flyingshot Lake had a population of 269 living in 96 of its 96 total private dwellings, a change of 2.3% from its 2011 population of 263. With a land area of 7.68 km^{2} (2.97 sq mi), it had a population density of 35.0/km^{2} (90.7/sq mi) in 2016.

== See also ==
- List of communities in Alberta
- List of designated places in Alberta
- List of settlements in Alberta
