= Steen River, Alberta =

Human settlement in Alberta, Canada

Coordinates: 59°37′39″N 117°10′02″W

Location of Steen River Alberta

Steen River is a settlement in northern Alberta within Mackenzie County, located on Highway 35, 140 kilometres (87 mi) north of High Level. It is located about 5.2 kilometres (3.2 mi) north of the Steen river and 44 kilometres (27 mi) south of the Alberta-Northwest Territories border, which eventually feeds into the Hay River. There is a meteorite crater near the settlement called the Steen River crater. In June 2019, the Jackpot Creek Fire burned through the area, which included the settlement.
