= Peerless Lake, Alberta =

Peerless Lake
- Unincorporated community
- Location of Peerless Lake in M.D. of Opportunity Location of Peerless Lake in Alberta
- Coordinates: 56.6708°N 114.5753°W
- Country: Canada
- Province: Alberta
- Census division: No. 17
- Municipal district: Municipal District of Opportunity No. 17

Government
  - Type: Unincorporated
  - Governing body: M.D. of Opportunity No. 17 Council

Area (2021)
  - Land: 11.03 km^{2} (4.26 sq mi)
- Elevation: 695 m (2,280 ft)

Population (2021)
  - Total: 429
  - Density: 38.9/km^{2} (101/sq mi)
- Time zone: UTC−06:00 (Alberta Time)
- Postal code: T0G 2W0

Peerless Lake is an unincorporated community in northern Alberta, Canada. It is located on the northeastern shore of Peerless Lake, approximately 70 kilometres (43 mi) northeast of Red Earth Creek, and has an elevation of 695 metres (2,280 ft).

The community is under the jurisdiction of the Municipal District of Opportunity No. 17 and is located in the federal riding of Fort McMurray-Athabasca.

== Demographics ==
In the 2021 Census of Population conducted by Statistics Canada, Peerless Lake had a population of 429 living in 100 of its 117 total private dwellings, a change of 28.4% from its 2016 population of 334. With a land area of 11.03 km^{2} (4.26 sq mi), it had a population density of 38.9/km^{2} (100.7/sq mi) in 2021.

As a designated place in the 2016 Census of Population conducted by Statistics Canada, Peerless Lake had a population of 334 living in 81 of its 96 total private dwellings, a change of 19.7% from its 2011 population of 279. With a land area of 11.19 km^{2} (4.32 sq mi), it had a population density of 29.8/km^{2} (77.3/sq mi) in 2016.

== Education ==
The community has a centre for higher education, Northern Lakes College, which offers a variety of programs using distance education technology and computer mediated instruction.

== See also ==
- List of communities in Alberta
- List of designated places in Alberta
