= Footner Lake =

Settlement in Alberta, Canada

Coordinates: 58.61670°N 117.14996°W

Location of Footner Lake in Alberta

Footner Lake is a settlement in northern Alberta, Canada within Mackenzie County. The nearby lake of the same name has the name of Hulbert Footner, a Canadian novelist.

It is located on the Mackenzie Highway approximately 12 kilometers (7.5 mi) north of High Level. It has an elevation of 335 meters (1,099 ft).

The High Level/Footner Lake Water Aerodrome is located immediately west of the settlement, on Footner Lake.

== See also ==
- List of communities in Alberta
- List of settlements in Alberta
