= Trout Lake, Alberta =

Trout Lake
- Designated place
- Location of Trout Lake Trout Lake (Canada)
- Coordinates: 56°30′N 114°32′W
- Country: Canada
- Province: Alberta
- Region: Northern Alberta
- Census division: 17
- Municipal district: Municipal District of Opportunity No. 17

Government
  - Type: Unincorporated
  - Governing body: Municipal District of Opportunity No. 17 Council

Area (2021)
  - Land: 5.25 km^{2} (2.03 sq mi)

Population (2021)
  - Total: 330
  - Density: 62.8/km^{2} (163/sq mi)
- Time zone: UTC−06:00 (Alberta Time)
- Area codes: 780, 587, 825

Trout Lake is an unincorporated community in northern Alberta within the Municipal District of Opportunity No. 17, located 48 kilometres (30 mi) east of Highway 88, 303 kilometres (188 mi) northeast of Grande Prairie.

== Demographics ==
In the 2021 Census of Population conducted by Statistics Canada, Trout Lake had a population of 330 living in 87 of its 104 total private dwellings, a change of −5.4% from its 2016 population of 349. With a land area of 5.25 km^{2} (2.03 sq mi), it had a population density of 62.9/km^{2} (162.8/sq mi) in 2021.

As a designated place in the 2016 Census of Population conducted by Statistics Canada, Trout Lake had a population of 349 living in 88 of its 110 total private dwellings, a change of 1.5% from its 2011 population of 344. With a land area of 5.34 km^{2} (2.06 sq mi), it had a population density of 65.4/km^{2} (169.3/sq mi) in 2016.

== See also ==
- List of communities in Alberta
- List of designated places in Alberta
