= Queen Elizabeth Provincial Park =

Provincial park in Alberta, Canada

- Location within Alberta
- Interactive map of Queen Elizabeth Provincial Park
- Location: Municipal District of Peace No. 135, Alberta, Canada
- Nearest city: Grimshaw
- Coordinates: 56°13′7″N 117°41′38″W
- Area: 0.8 km^{2} (0.31 sq mi)
- Established: March 01, 1956
- Governing body: Alberta Tourism, Parks and Recreation

Queen Elizabeth Provincial Park is a provincial park located 10 km (6.2 mi) northwest of Grimshaw, in northern Alberta, west of the junction of Highway 2 and the Mackenzie Highway. It was named Lac Cardinal Provincial Park until 1 August 1978, when it was renamed Queen Elizabeth Provincial Park to commemorate the tour of the province by Queen Elizabeth II, Queen of Canada.

The park is situated on the eastern shore of Cardinal Lake, at an elevation of 640 m (2,100 ft), and has an area of 0.8 km^{2} (0.31 sq mi). It was established on 1 March 1956 and is maintained by Alberta Tourism, Parks and Recreation.

== Activities ==
The following activities are available in the park:

- Beach activities (including swimming and volleyball)
- Birdwatching (141 bird species have been observed)
- Camping
- Canoeing and kayaking
- Cross-country skiing (4.5 kilometres (2.8 mi) non-groomed trails)
- Front country hiking
- Horseshoes
- Power boating, sailing, water-skiing and windsurfing

== See also ==
- List of provincial parks in Alberta
- List of Canadian provincial parks
- List of National Parks of Canada
- Royal eponyms in Canada
