= Little Buffalo, Alberta =

Little Buffalo
- Native American settlement and hamlet
- Location of Little Buffalo in Alberta
- Coordinates: 56.4375°N 116.1075°W
- Country: Canada
- Province: Alberta
- Census division: No. 19
- Municipal district: Northern Sunrise County
- Founded: 1953

Government
  - Type: Unincorporated
  - Governing body: Northern Sunrise County Council
  - Ward 6 Councillor: Darlene Cardinal

Area
  - Land: 13.26 km^{2} (5.12 sq mi)

Population
  - Settlement (2016): 452
  - Hamlet (2010): 225
- Time zone: UTC−06:00 (Alberta Time)
- Postal code: T0H

Little Buffalo is an Indian settlement and hamlet in northern Alberta, Canada within Northern Sunrise County, adjacent to Woodland Cree 228. It is located on Highway 986, approximately 100 kilometres (62 mi) northeast of the Town of Peace River and 47 kilometres (29 mi) west of Highway 88. Little Buffalo Lake is to the south of the community.

== History ==
Land claims

"The Lubicon Lake Indian Band land claim has a history dating back one hundred years, when the Band was left out of the original Treaty Eight signing by government agents in 1889." On October 22, 1988, Lubicon Chief Bernard Ominayak and Alberta Provincial Premier Don Getty negotiated an agreement, since called the "Grimshaw Accord". through which the Province of Alberta transferred 79 square miles of land (with full surface and sub-surface rights) to the Government of Canada to establish a reserve for the Lubicon First Nation On 10 June 2013, on behalf of the Lubicon Cree, aboriginal rights lawyer, James O'Reilly sent letters to Shell Canada, PineCrest, Atco, Andora Energy Corp., Clean Harbours, Mancal Energy Inc. and Penn West Petroleum which operate in the disputed land claims area, warning that their resource projects will be "vigorously opposed" unless they have the consent of the First Nation.

2011 Little Buffalo oil spill

The Little Buffalo oil spill on April 29, 2011, resulted in the discharge of 28,000 barrels of oil in an isolated stretch of boreal forest in northern Alberta, approximately 10 kilometres (6.2 mi) from Little Buffalo. The spill was caused by a rupture in the Rainbow Pipeline system, owned by Plains Midstream Canada, a unit of Plains All American Pipeline. It was the largest oil spill in Alberta in 36 years. The local school was closed following the oil spill due to concerns about the effects of fumes. In 2013, Alberta's Energy Resource Conservation Board (ERCB) issued a reprimand to Plains Mainstream for operational failures in connection with the oil spill.

2013 pipeline spill

Pennwest reported that on the evening of June 22, 2013, between "400,000 and 600,000 litres of salty waste water" and 5,000 litres of oil leaked from their pipeline approximately 20 km (12 mi) from Little Buffalo on land that is proposed as a future reserve and is regularly used by Lubicon Lake Cree for hunting and trapping. The size of the spill and the 2.5 km^{2} (0.97 mi^{2}) area affected, which includes surface waters and muskeg lands, reported by Pennwest alarmed the Lubicon Lake Cree, who now claim the spill is larger than initial estimates. Bernard Ominayak, the chief of the Lubicon Lake Nation is concerned about the safety of the Lubicon Cree citizens and their environment, including groundwater and wildlife. Alberta Environment and Water was onsite by June 24 and is investigating the leak, which occurred during the period of heavy rain. The concurrent closure of Pennwest's office in downtown Calgary due to the 2013 Alberta floods has had a "negative effect on the management of the spill, particularly when it comes to communications."

== Demographics ==
Settlement

In the 2021 Census of Population conducted by Statistics Canada, Little Buffalo had a population of 441 living in 115 of its 120 total private dwellings, a change of −2.4% from its 2016 population of 452. With a land area of 12.86 km^{2} (4.97 sq mi), it had a population density of 34.3/km^{2} (88.8/sq mi) in 2021.

In the 2016 Census of Population conducted by Statistics Canada, Little Buffalo had a population of 452 living in 113 of its 130 total private dwellings, a 16.8% change from its 2011 population of 387. With a land area of 13.26 km^{2} (5.12 sq mi), it had a population density of 34.1/km^{2} (88.3/sq mi) in 2016.

Hamlet

The population of Little Buffalo according to the 2010 municipal census conducted by Northern Sunrise County is 225.

== See also ==
- List of communities in Alberta
- List of hamlets in Alberta
