= Municipal District of Peace No. 135 =

Municipal district in Alberta, Canada

- Municipal district
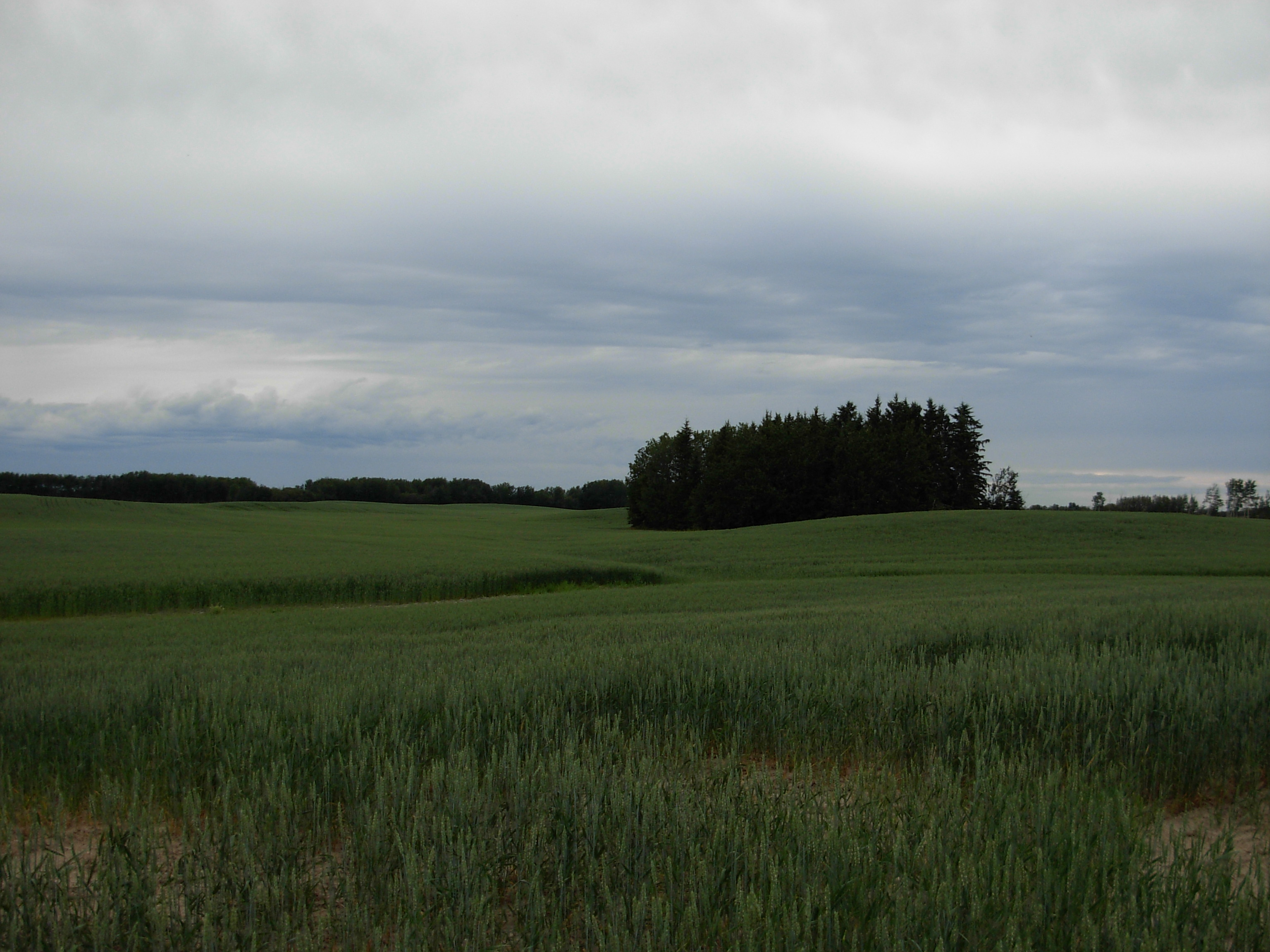
- Grain fields in the Peace Country

- Logo

- Location within Alberta
- Country: Canada
- Province: Alberta
- Region: Northern Alberta
- Census division: 19
- Established: 1916
- Incorporated: 1945

Government
  - Reeve: Robert Willing
  - Governing body: MD of Peace Council
  - Administrative office: adjacent to Berwyn

Area (2021)
  - Land: 847.22 km^{2} (327.11 sq mi)

Population (2021)
  - Total: 1,581
  - Density: 1.9/km^{2} (4.9/sq mi)
- Time zone: UTC−06:00 (Alberta Time)
- Website: mdpeace.com

The Municipal District of Peace No. 135 is a municipal district (MD) in northwestern Alberta, Canada. Located in Census Division No. 19, its municipal office is located outside but adjacent to the Village of Berwyn.

== Geography ==
=== Communities and localities ===
The following urban municipalities are surrounded by the MD of Peace No. 135.

Cities

- none

Towns

- Grimshaw

Villages

- Berwyn (location of municipal office)

Summer villages

- none

The following hamlets are located within the MD of Peace No. 135.

Hamlets

- Brownvale

The following localities are located within the MD of Peace No. 135.

Localities

- Early Gardens
- Griffin Creek
- Last Lake
- Peace River Correctional Institution
- Rocky Ridge Estates
- Roma
- Roma Junction
- Shaftesbury Settlement (designated place) or Shaftsbury Settlement

== Demographics ==
Federal census population history
| Year | Pop. | ±% |
|---|---|---|
| 1916 | 918 | — |
| 1921 | 1,337 | +45.6% |
| 1926 | 1,377 | +3.0% |
| 1931 | 1,990 | +44.5% |
| 1936 | 2,155 | +8.3% |
| 1941 | 2,003 | −7.1% |
| 1946 | 1,791 | −10.6% |
| 1951 | 1,741 | −2.8% |
| 1956 | 1,732 | −0.5% |
| 1961 | 1,917 | +10.7% |
| 1966 | 1,745 | −9.0% |
| 1971 | 1,624 | −6.9% |
| 1976 | 1,583 | −2.5% |
| 1981 | 1,520 | −4.0% |
| 1986 | 1,527 | +0.5% |
| 1991 | 1,481 | −3.0% |
| 1996 | 1,562 | +5.5% |
| 2001 | 1,496 | −4.2% |
| 2006 | 1,487 | −0.6% |
| 2011 | 1,446 | −2.8% |
| 2016 | 1,747 | +20.8% |
Source: Statistics Canada

In the 2021 Census of Population conducted by Statistics Canada, the MD of Peace No. 135 had a population of 1,581 living in 577 of its 654 total private dwellings, a change of −9.8% from its 2016 population of 1,752. With a land area of 847.22 km^{2} (327.11 sq mi), it had a population density of 1.9/km^{2} (4.8/sq mi) in 2021.

In the 2016 Census of Population conducted by Statistics Canada, the MD of Peace No. 135 had a population of 1,747 living in 578 of its 639 total private dwellings, a 20.8% change from its 2011 population of 1,446. With a land area of 847.47 km^{2} (327.21 sq mi), it had a population density of 2.1/km^{2} (5.3/sq mi) in 2016.

== Economy ==
Agriculture is a significant part of the area's economy, with the region being dubbed as most northern agricultural industry oasis in the world. The region has unique growing combination of a northern climate, fertile soils, and a watershed system fed by glacial run offs.

== Attractions ==
- Lac Cardinal Recreation Area
- Queen Elizabeth Provincial Park
- Strong Creek Park
- Wilderness Park

== See also ==
- List of communities in Alberta
- List of francophone communities in Alberta
- List of municipal districts in Alberta
