= Red Earth Creek =

- Hamlet
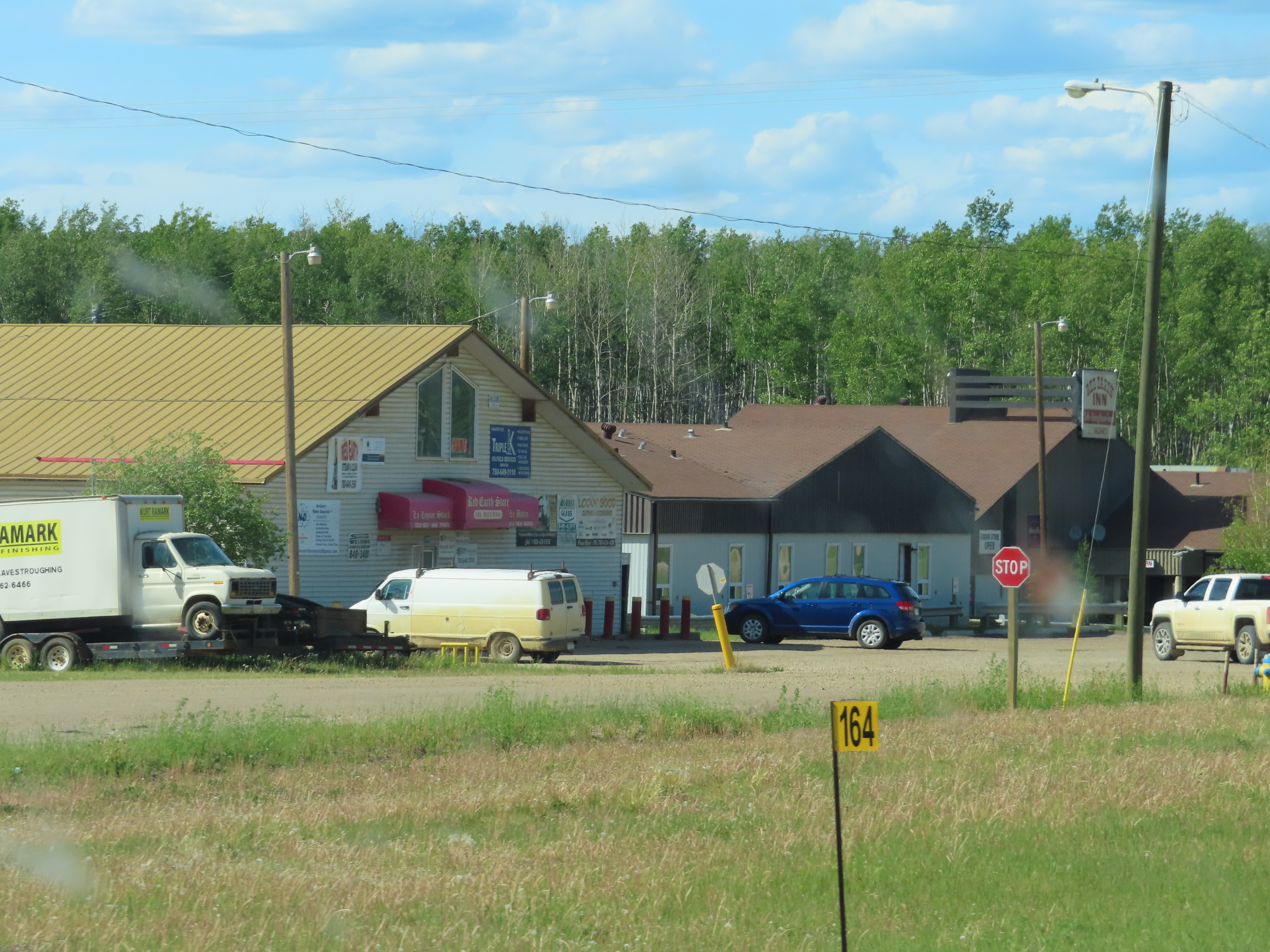
- Businesses along Highway 88

- Location within M.D. of Opportunity Location within Alberta Location within Canada Location within North America
- Coordinates: 56.5406°N 115.2853°W
- Country: Canada
- Province: Alberta
- Municipal district: Opportunity No. 17

Government
  - Type: Unincorporated
  - Governing body: M.D. of Opportunity No. 17 Council

Area (2021)
  - Land: 29.6 km^{2} (11.4 sq mi)
- Elevation: 520 m (1,710 ft)

Population (2021)
  - Total: 315
  - Density: 10.6/km^{2} (27/sq mi)
- Time zone: UTC−06:00 (Alberta Time)

Red Earth Creek is a hamlet in Alberta, Canada within the Municipal District of Opportunity No. 17. It is located east of Highway 88, between the town of Slave Lake and the hamlet of Fort Vermilion, and has an elevation of 520 metres (1,710 ft).

This hamlet is in Census Division No. 17 and in the federal riding of Fort McMurray-Athabasca. It is also the administrative centre of the Loon River First Nation reserve

== History ==
Originally the site was known as “Osseepeem” (His Creek).

The hamlet was subjected by Treaty No. 5 by the Saulteaux and Swampy Cree on September 20, 1875.

== Demographics ==
In the 2021 Census of Population conducted by Statistics Canada, Red Earth Creek had a population of 315 living in 113 of its 145 total private dwellings, a change of −10.8% from its 2016 population of 353. With a land area of 29.6 km^{2} (11.4 sq mi), it had a population density of 10.6/km^{2} (27.6/sq mi) in 2021.

As a designated place in the 2016 Census of Population conducted by Statistics Canada, Red Earth Creek had a population of 294 living in 111 of its 200 total private dwellings, a change of −12.8% from its 2011 population of 337. With a land area of 38.66 km^{2} (14.93 sq mi), it had a population density of 7.6/km^{2} (19.7/sq mi) in 2016.

== Climate ==
Climate data for Red Earth Creek
Month	Jan	Feb	Mar	Apr	May	Jun	Jul	Aug	Sep	Oct	Nov	Dec	Year
Record high °C (°F)	1.0 (33.8)	8.0 (46.4)	13.0 (55.4)	30.0 (86.0)	33.3 (91.9)	36.3 (97.3)	33.0 (91.4)	33.0 (91.4)	31.7 (89.1)	22.2 (72.0)	6.0 (42.8)	1.0 (33.8)	36.3 (97.3)
Mean daily maximum °C (°F)	−9.4 (15.1)	−5.9 (21.4)	0.6 (33.1)	10.0 (50.0)	16.1 (61.0)	19.6 (67.3)	21.4 (70.5)	20.3 (68.5)	14.7 (58.5)	10.5 (50.9)	−5.0 (23.0)	−7.8 (18.0)	7.1 (44.8)
Daily mean °C (°F)	−15.3 (4.5)	−11.0 (12.2)	−6.6 (20.1)	2.5 (36.5)	9.8 (49.6)	13.7 (56.7)	15.5 (59.9)	14.2 (57.6)	9.0 (48.2)	4.6 (40.3)	−10.6 (12.9)	−13.9 (7.0)	1.0 (33.8)
Mean daily minimum °C (°F)	−21.1 (−6.0)	−16.1 (3.0)	−13.8 (7.2)	−5.1 (22.8)	3.3 (37.9)	7.7 (45.9)	9.6 (49.3)	8.1 (46.6)	3.3 (37.9)	−1.4 (29.5)	−16.4 (2.5)	−19.8 (−3.6)	−5.1 (22.8)
Record low °C (°F)	−41.0 (−41.8)	−30.5 (−22.9)	−24.5 (−12.1)	−20.5 (−4.9)	−10.0 (14.0)	−2.5 (27.5)	1.0 (33.8)	−3.0 (26.6)	−14.4 (6.1)	−13.3 (8.1)	−31.0 (−23.8)	−37.0 (−34.6)	−41.0 (−41.8)
Average precipitation cm (inches)	1.7 (0.7)	0.9 (0.4)	1.1 (0.4)	1.3 (0.5)	5.3 (2.1)	8.8 (3.5)	9.2 (3.6)	6.5 (2.6)	4.3 (1.7)	2.0 (0.8)	2.5 (1.0)	1.8 (0.7)	45.4 (18)
Average rainfall cm (inches)	0.0 (0.0)	0.0 (0.0)	0.0 (0.0)	0.3 (0.1)	4.9 (1.9)	8.8 (3.5)	9.2 (3.6)	6.5 (2.6)	4.0 (1.6)	0.9 (0.4)	0.0 (0.0)	0.0 (0.0)	34.6 (13.7)
Average snowfall cm (inches)	22 (8.7)	14 (5.5)	19 (7.5)	18 (7.1)	4 (1.6)	0 (0)	0 (0)	0 (0)	3 (1.2)	8 (3.1)	25 (9.8)	18 (7.1)	131 (51.6)
Average precipitation days (≥ 0.02cm)	10	9	6	3	11	14	15	13	10	6	12	8	117
Source: http://www.farmzone.com/statistics/summary/cl3075491/na020

== See also ==
- List of communities in Alberta
- List of designated places in Alberta
- List of hamlets in Alberta
