= Fort Vermilion =

- Hamlet
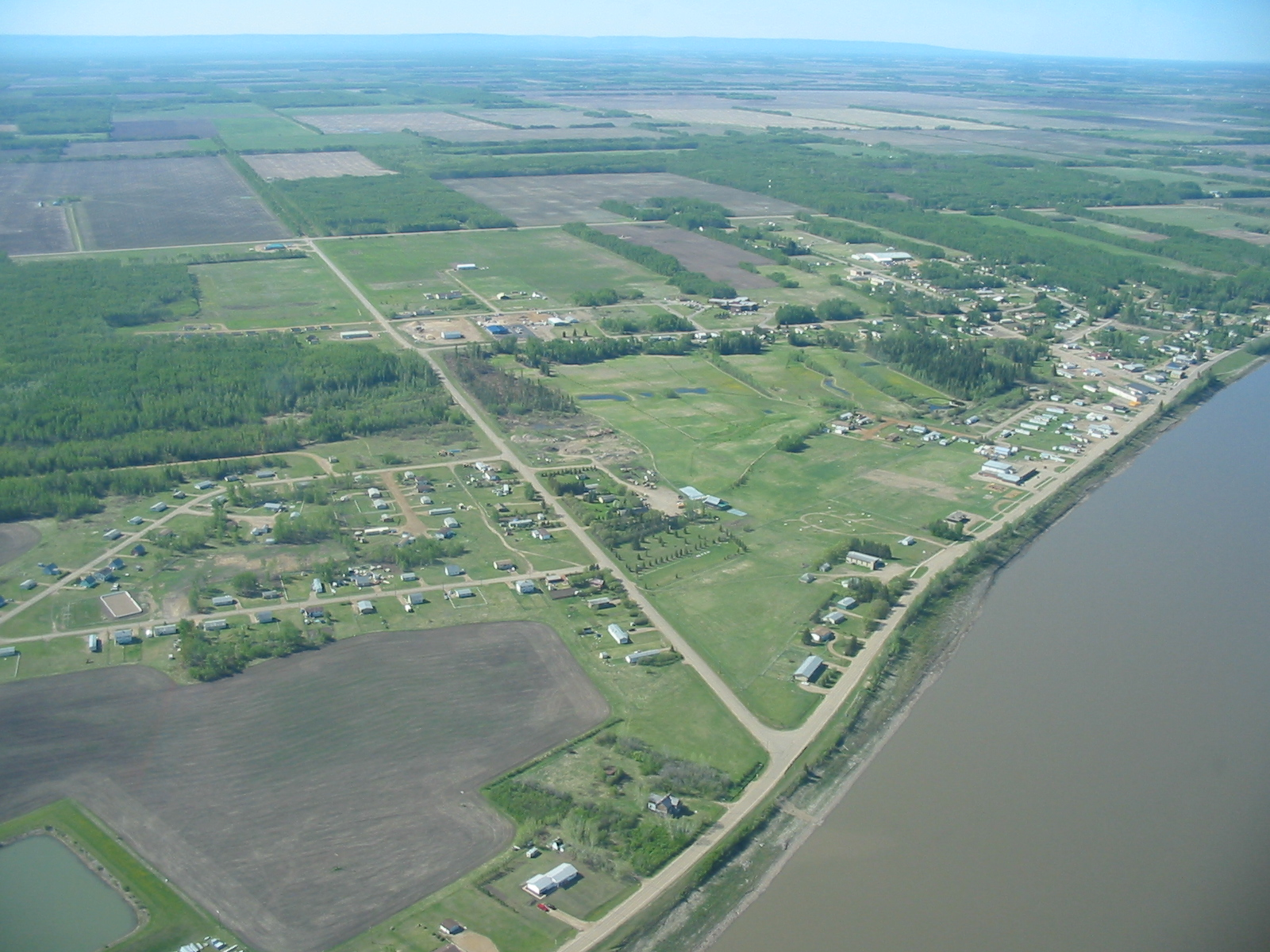
- Aerial view from north

- Seal

- Location of Fort Vermilion in Alberta Fort Vermilion (Canada) Fort Vermilion (North America)
- Coordinates: 58°23′24″N 116°01′00″W
- Country: Canada
- Province: Alberta
- Region: Northern Alberta
- Census division: 17
- Specialized municipality: Mackenzie County
- Established: 1788 (oldest in Alberta)

Government
  - Type: Unincorporated
  - Reeve: Josh Knelsen
  - Governing body: Mackenzie County Council: Jacquie Bateman; Peter F. Braun; Cameron Cardinal; David Driedger; Eric Jorgensen; Joshua Knelsen; Anthony Peters; Ernest Peters; Walter Sarapuk; Lisa Wardley
  - MP: Arnold Viersen (Cons - Peace River—Westlock)
  - MLA: Dan Williams (UCP - Peace River)

Area (2021)
  - Land: 5.36 km^{2} (2.07 sq mi)
- Elevation: 270 m (890 ft)

Population (2021)
  - Total: 753
  - Density: 140.4/km^{2} (364/sq mi)
- Time zone: UTC−06:00 (Alberta Time)
- Postal code: T0H 1N0
- Area codes: 780, 587, 825
- Highways: Highway 88 (Bicentennial Highway)
- Waterways: Peace River

Fort Vermilion is a hamlet on the Peace River in northern Alberta, Canada, within Mackenzie County.

Established in 1788, Fort Vermilion shares the title of oldest European settlement in Alberta with Fort Chipewyan. Fort Vermilion contains many modern amenities to serve its inhabitants as well as the surrounding rural community. The municipal office of Mackenzie County, Alberta's largest municipality by land area, is located in Fort Vermilion.

The hamlet is located in Census Division No. 17.

== History ==
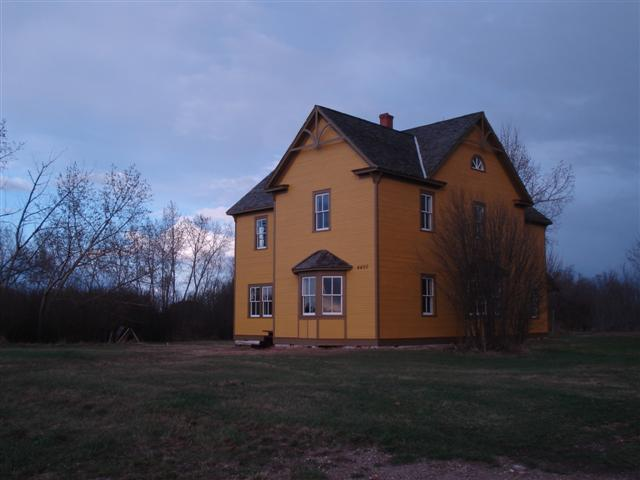
The Old Bay House

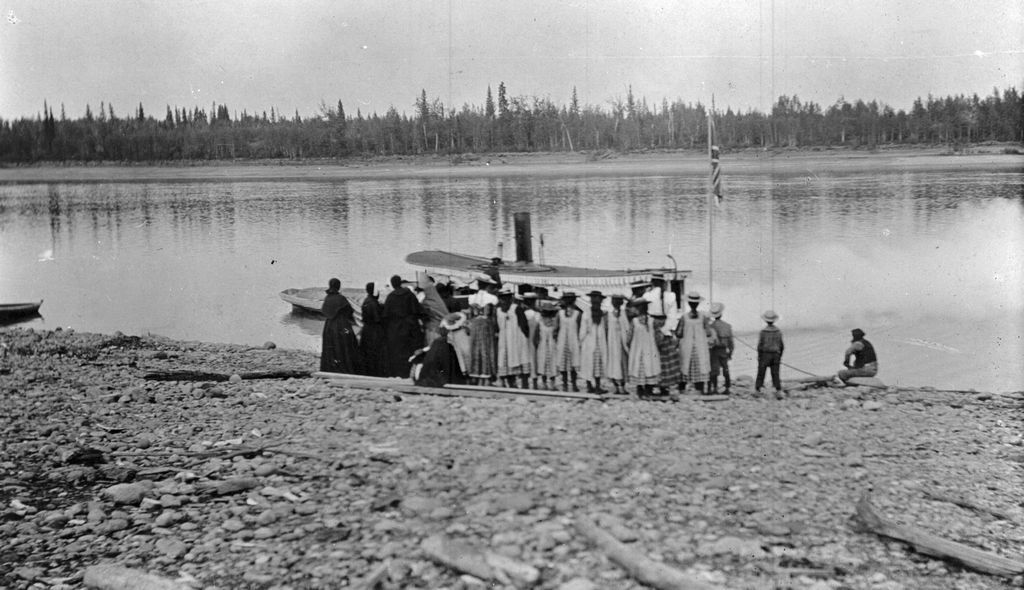
The Hudson's Bay Company vessel Messenger at Fort Vermilion

The area was inhabited by Dane-zaa (Beaver), Dene and later Cree First Nations long before the arrival of European traders and settlers.

Named for the vermilion coloured clays lining the river banks, Fort Vermilion started as a trading community for the North West Company, upstream of the impassible Vermilion Chutes. The fort was established in 1788, following the expeditions of Alexander MacKenzie. Winter residents would trade furs with the native trappers, then send the furs by river during the summer to exchange points to the east and then to Montreal. The fort was later transferred to the Hudson's Bay Company after the 1821 merger. By 1830, it was a prosperous fur trading post. The first Anglican church was built in 1877.

The main access to the settlements was by means of the river, using river boats and then ferries to haul materials in the summer months, when the water was not frozen. In 1903 the first steam-powered vessel to serve Fort Vermilion was the St. Charles built to navigate the 526 mi (847 km) to the upper reaches of the Peace River, from Hudson's Hope to Fort Vermilion. In 1974, a bridge was built over the Peace River immediately west of Fort Vermilion, effectively ending the winter isolation of the community.

The original Old Bay House, home of the chief factor, still exists and is now part of the Fort Vermilion National Historic Site. It was listed as such in 1968, for its importance as site of North West Company and Hudson's Bay Company posts.

The visitor centre is hosted in a 1923 dovetailed log house. Built on the banks of the Peace River, it was moved to its current location in 1983. Another heritage building is the 1907 Clark House, built for the Hudson's Bay clerk quarters, and moved in 1994 to the present location near the visitor centre. The Trappers Shack, built in 1912, is another dovetailed log house. It was listed as a provincial historic site.

In 2018, the airport was named after Canadian Wop May, former bush pilot and WW1 flying ace. It was to Fort Vermilion that May flew to in 1929 with lifesaving drugs.

== Demographics ==
Population history of Fort Vermilion
Year	Pop.	±%
1941	292	—
1951	1,413	+383.9%
1956	631	−55.3%
1961	768	+21.7%
1966	971	+26.4%
1971	740	−23.8%
1976	729	−1.5%
1981	752	+3.2%
1986	823	+9.4%
1991	782	−5.0%
1991A	802	+2.6%
1996	775	−3.4%
2001	818	+5.5%
2006	714	−12.7%
2011	727	+1.8%
2016	639	−12.1%
2021	753	+17.8%
Source: Statistics Canada

In the 2021 Census of Population conducted by Statistics Canada, Fort Vermilion had a population of 753 living in 257 of its 292 total private dwellings, a change of 17.8% from its 2016 population of 639. With a land area of 5.36 km^{2} (2.07 sq mi), it had a population density of 140.5/km^{2} (363.9/sq mi) in 2021.

The population of Fort Vermilion according to the 2018 municipal census conducted by Mackenzie County is 763.

As a designated place in the 2016 Census of Population conducted by Statistics Canada, Fort Vermilion had a population of 639 living in 224 of its 294 total private dwellings, a change of −12.1% from its 2011 population of 727. With a land area of 5.8 km^{2} (2.2 sq mi), it had a population density of 110.2/km^{2} (285.3/sq mi) in 2016.

== Education ==
Two schools are located in Fort Vermilion, both administered by the Fort Vermilion School Division No. 52.

Fort Vermilion Public is part of the public school system and offers education from grade 6 to grade 12. Approximately 150 students attend this school. St. Mary's Elementary functions in the Catholic school system and is a kindergarten to grade 6 school. It has approximately 145 students.

The Northern Lakes College, established in 1999, has one of its 26 campuses in Fort Vermilion. It was previously known as Alberta Vocational Centre Grouard, and offered education to First Nations students.

== Geography ==
Fort Vermilion is located approximately 85 km (53 mi) southeast of High Level and 661 km (411 mi) northwest of Edmonton on the Highway 88 (Bicentennial Highway). The hamlet of La Crete is located approximately 47 km (29 mi) southwest of Fort Vermilion on Highway 697.

The hamlet is one of the northernmost communities in the Peace River Country. Peace Country, in the aspen parkland biome, is Canada's northernmost land suitable for agriculture. The landscape is dominated by aspen, poplars and spruce, occasionally interspersed with areas of grasslands. Wildlife is abundant in the area, and includes bears, moose, deer, beavers, foxes, coyotes and Canada geese and Sandhill cranes

The hamlet is situated on the southern banks of the Peace River, with an elevation ranging from 255 to 282 m (837 to 925 ft) and the Indian reserve of Fort Vermilion 173B is about a kilometre east. The North Vermilion Settlement lies on the opposite (northern) shore of the river, while Fort Vermilion (Wop May Memorial) Aerodrome is located directly beside the hamlet on the north east side.

=== Climate ===
Despite being so high in latitude, Fort Vermilion experiences a humid continental climate (Köppen Dfb), though bordering closely on subarctic (Dfc), with long, frigid, exceedingly variable winters and brief but fairly warm summers. Temperatures during the winter can drop to −40 °C (−40 °F) to −50 °C (−58 °F). Summer days benefit from long hours of daylight due to its northern location.

Fort Vermilion holds the record for the coldest temperature in Alberta as well as any Canadian province, when on 11 January 1911, the temperature dropped down to −61.2 °C (−78.2 °F), which is the coldest official temperature recorded in Canada outside Yukon. However, an unofficial temperature of −61.7 °C or −79.1 °F was recorded in Fort Good Hope, Northwest Territories less than two weeks previously on 31 December 1910.

The highest temperature recorded was 39.4 °C (102.9 °F) on 15 May 1912. This gives a temperature range of 100.6 °C (181.1 °F), one of only a handful locations in the world, and the only permanently inhabited place outside Sakha, to have a temperature amplitude of over 100 °C or 180 °F. Recorded temperature amplitudes for each winter month approach or exceed 75 °C or 135 °F, and are probably the largest monthly amplitudes anywhere in the world.

Climate data for Fort Vermilion (Fort Vermilion CDA) WMO ID / Climate ID: n/a; coordinates 58°23′N 116°02′W; elevation: 279 m (915 ft); 1961-1990 normals
Month	Jan	Feb	Mar	Apr	May	Jun	Jul	Aug	Sep	Oct	Nov	Dec	Year
Record high °C (°F)	11.7 (53.1)	21.1 (70.0)	18.3 (65.0)	29.0 (84.2)	39.4 (103.0)	36.7 (98.1)	37.8 (100.0)	38.3 (101.0)	31.7 (89.1)	27.2 (81.0)	16.5 (61.7)	18.3 (65.0)	39.4 (103.0)
Mean daily maximum °C (°F)	−18.2 (−0.8)	−12.0 (10.4)	−3.7 (25.3)	7.8 (46.0)	16.7 (62.1)	21.6 (70.9)	23.1 (73.6)	21.3 (70.3)	14.6 (58.3)	6.7 (44.1)	−6.8 (19.8)	−15.7 (3.7)	4.6 (40.3)
Daily mean °C (°F)	−22.7 (−8.9)	−17.3 (0.9)	−10.0 (14.0)	1.8 (35.2)	10.2 (50.4)	15.0 (59.0)	16.9 (62.4)	15.0 (59.0)	8.9 (48.0)	2.2 (36.0)	−10.5 (13.1)	−19.8 (−3.6)	−0.9 (30.4)
Mean daily minimum °C (°F)	−27.3 (−17.1)	−22.8 (−9.0)	−16.2 (2.8)	−4.2 (24.4)	3.7 (38.7)	8.4 (47.1)	10.6 (51.1)	8.7 (47.7)	3.2 (37.8)	−2.4 (27.7)	−14.4 (6.1)	−24.2 (−11.6)	−6.4 (20.5)
Record low °C (°F)	−61.2 (−78.2)	−57.2 (−71.0)	−47.2 (−53.0)	−38.9 (−38.0)	−14.4 (6.1)	−8.9 (16.0)	−6.7 (19.9)	−5.6 (21.9)	−15.0 (5.0)	−32.0 (−25.6)	−43.9 (−47.0)	−57.8 (−72.0)	−61.2 (−78.2)
Average precipitation mm (inches)	20.2 (0.80)	17.5 (0.69)	19.8 (0.78)	18.8 (0.74)	35.3 (1.39)	47.1 (1.85)	64.4 (2.54)	54.7 (2.15)	35.4 (1.39)	28.1 (1.11)	20.8 (0.82)	19.7 (0.78)	381.7 (15.03)
Average rainfall mm (inches)	0.9 (0.04)	0.7 (0.03)	0.8 (0.03)	7.6 (0.30)	32.9 (1.30)	47.1 (1.85)	64.4 (2.54)	54.7 (2.15)	34.5 (1.36)	16.1 (0.63)	1.3 (0.05)	0.9 (0.04)	261.9 (10.31)
Average snowfall cm (inches)	21.0 (8.3)	17.5 (6.9)	20.7 (8.1)	11.7 (4.6)	2.2 (0.9)	0.0 (0.0)	0.0 (0.0)	0.0 (0.0)	0.8 (0.3)	10.8 (4.3)	20.9 (8.2)	20.2 (8.0)	125.8 (49.5)
Average precipitation days (≥ 0.2 mm (Note: Entries with — indicate less than 1 mm.))	7	6	6	5	8	10	11	11	9	7	8	8	96
Average rainy days (≥ 0.2 mm)	—	—	—	2	8	10	11	—	—	5	—	—	55
Average snowy days (≥ 0.2 cm)	7	6	6	2	—	0	0	0	—	3	7	8	39.00
Source: Environment and Climate Change Canada

== Infrastructure ==
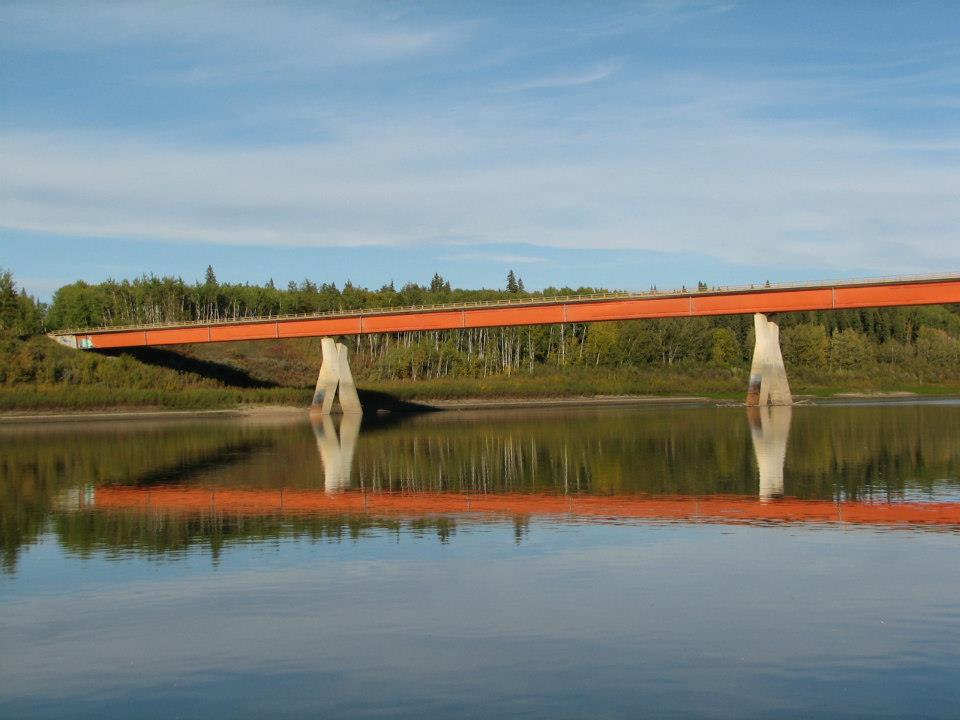
A side view of the Fort Vermilion Bridge crossing the Peace River

The Fort Vermilion Community and Cultural Complex includes a hockey rink and concession, community hall/dance hall/stage with commercial kitchen and a curling rink. The Fort Vermilion Heritage Centre manages 25 sites (listed as both provincial and national historic sites), including the old log houses, the Dominion Experimental Farm, First Nations and natural history exhibits. Also located at the community complex is a RV waste dumping site and potable water refill location. The community complex also boasts workout facilities, a splash park, ball diamonds and playground - making it a great stop to relax and cool off on hot summer days.

St. Theresa General Hospital is a building built in 1983, offering 26 acute-care beds and 8 long-term-care beds, as well as an emergency department. It employs approximately 76 health workers, and is administered by Alberta Health Services. The Provincial Court of Alberta maintains a circuit court in Fort Vermilion, with the base point located in High Level. The court used to reside in the old hospital building but now has a modern facility beside west of St. Henry's Roman Catholic Church. The old hospital building (aka old court house) has now been re-purposed and relocated as an office place for MARA (Mackenzie Applied Research Association) at the Fort Vermilion Experimental Farm.

The Fantasy North Golf & Country Club is a 9-hole golf course with a 150-year history. Additional facilities include a mini golf park, driving range and clubhouse. The course closed in spring 2020 following the flooding of the Peace River and remains inoperational due to extensive flood damage to clubhouse and course watering system.

The hamlet also has a public library and four churches: St. Theresa Catholic Church, Church of God in Christ Mennonite, Faith Gospel Fellowship and St. Luke's Anglican Church. The St. Luke's Anglican Church Cemetery dates back to 1877.

Located east of the settlement is the Fort Vermilion (Wop May Memorial) Aerodrome (TC LID: CEZ4), administered by Mackenzie County. It is an airport that serves the area with Provincial Air Ambulance services, as well as aerial firefighting. CanWest Air operates a base here with a charter and medevac aircraft, mostly unitizing the Cessna 206 for their charter work. There is also a small heliport, Fort Vermilion/Country Gardens B&B Heliport.

The Rodeo Grounds are located 5 km (3.1 mi) southwest of the community, and hosts a rodeo every year in July (check for dates). The event features cattle roping and bucking broncos along with other competition.

Other events and festivals held in Fort Vermilion include Canada Day celebrations, Town and Country Fair, River Daze and Arts and Crafts Show. A Farmer's Market is organized periodically based on interest. The yearly Get to Know You Night is held in mid September to promote services and organizations is popular with northern residents.

DA Thomas Park is a grassed day use area in Fort Vermilion that provides picnic tables with campfire spots overlooking the river with a boat launch and dock to access the river.

There are a number of beaches along the Peace River that are accessible only by boat (upstream and downstream). In North Vermilion (Buttertown) there is a beach accessible by road.

== Government ==
Fort Vermilion is in the federal riding of Peace River—Westlock, represented by MP Arnold Viersen. Prior to the 2012 redistribution of federal electoral riding boundaries, the land was part of the Peace River electoral district.

== Notable residents ==
Fred Brick, husband to Sarah Lendrum (formerly of the Strathcona area), was an early businessman, farmer and trader at Fort Vermilion. Sarah came to join Fred at Fort Vermilion in 1896.

Fort Vermilion was home to cowboy Kenton Randle, known as "Rugged". Born 1960 and deceased 23 November 2003. Kenton was the bareback bronc rider who represented Canada at the 2002 Olympics in Salt Lake City. In November 2015 he was inducted into the Canadian Pro Rodeo Hall of Fame as a Legend of Rodeo.

Fort Vermilion was the childhood home of writers and brothers Will Ferguson and Ian Ferguson. Will vividly describes his childhood there in his memoirs Beauty Tips from Moose Jaw. He mentions that the town was included in the 1976 version of Ghost Towns of Alberta, much to the chagrin of its residents at that time.

Dave Hancock, named 15th premier of Alberta on 23 March 2014 following the resignation of Alison Redford, grew up in Fort Vermilion.

Gloria Chomiak Atamanenko, a social worker, writer, and translator, was born in Fort Vermilion.

== See also ==
- List of communities in Alberta
- List of designated places in Alberta
- List of hamlets in Alberta
