= Chinchaga Wildland Provincial Park =

Protected area in northwestern Alberta, Canada

- IUCN category Ib (wilderness area)
- Location within Alberta Location within Canada Location within Clear Hills County
- Location: Clear Hills County, Alberta, Canada
- Nearest town: Manning
- Coordinates: 57°09′N 119°34′W
- Area: 80,270 ha (309.9 sq mi)
- Established: 15 December 1999
- Governing body: Alberta Tourism, Parks and Recreation

Chinchaga Wildland Provincial Park is a wildland provincial park in northwestern Alberta, Canada. The park is a 802.7 square kilometres (310 sq mi) environmentally protected tract of land within the 5,000 km^{2} (1,900 sq mi) of the greater Chinchaga wilderness area. It is a disjunct outlier of the Foothills Natural Region of Alberta. It was established on 15 December 1999. The greater Chinchaga area was identified in 1995 as an Environmentally Significant Area. It was designated by the Alberta Government as a protected area under the "Special Places" program. The park is administered by the Upper Peace Land Use Framework.

== Location ==
The park is in Clear Hills County in northwestern Alberta about 100 kilometres (62 mi) west of Manning and approximately 12 kilometres (7.5 mi) east of the British Columbia border. The upper course of the Chinchaga River forms the Park's northern border while the southern border is the slopes of Halverson Ridge. Elevations in the Park range from less than 700 metres (2,300 ft) at the Chinchaga River in the north to over 1,050 metres (3,440 ft) at the top of Halverson Ridge. The park is extremely isolated and remote and without formal roads. The closest road is the Chinchaga Forestry Road, a high-grade gravel road running west from the Mackenzie Highway and crossing into British Columbia north of the Chinchaga River. Significant previous oil and gas exploration activity has left seismic cut lines throughout the park allowing access via off-road vehicles.

== History ==
The Chinchaga area was mainly used by small populations of First Nations and Métis for hunting.

=== Chinchaga Firestorm 1950 ===
In the spring of 1950 the watershed of the Chinchaga River experienced drought conditions that extended over boreal regions of northern Canada.

On 1 June 1950 human activity caused a forest fire in the Chinchaga area, one of the largest if not the largest in modern North American history. The ignition point was north of Fort St. John, British Columbia. At the time of the fire Imperial Oil surveying crew were on site. Other sources theorize that slash burning from agricultural clearing could have been the initial spark. The fire burned north-eastward nearly to Keg River, Alberta and continued to burn throughout the summer and early fall until the end of October. It destroyed 10,000 square kilometres (3,900 sq mi) of the Chinchaga area. Size estimates have varied due to the imprecise measurement techniques of the time period. Estimates at the time ranged from 1 to 1.4 million hectares (2.5×10^{6} to 3.5×10^{6} acres). In 2008 and 2009 the final size was considerably larger than previous estimates, placing the total burned area at 1.7 million hectares (4.2×10^{6} acres). While most likely not the largest fire in the history of the North American boreal forest, it produced the largest burned area of any recorded fire on the continent.

=== 1997 ===
In the 1997 report commissioned by the Alberta Environmental Protection the Chinchaga Diversity Area and the Chinchaga River were designated as an Environmentally Significant Areas (ESAs).

=== Senate Committee Report on Boreal Forest 1999 ===
In June 1999, the Senate Committee on Agriculture and Forestry's Subcommittee on the Boreal Forest published their report Competing Realities: The Boreal Forest at Risk which contained 35 recommendations intended to ensure that Canada adopt "a natural forest landscape-based approach to managing a boreal forest that is coming increasingly under siege".

=== Special Places 2000 ===
Under the 2000 "Special Places" program. the natural state of the area is intended to be protected, however, other uses are permitted under provincial law. Concerns have been raised about oil and gas development in parts of this wilderness area.

In 2000 both the Alberta Wildlife Society (AWS) and the Canadian Parks and Wilderness Society were disappointed with the small size and poor quality of the Chinchaga wilderness region chosen by the province of Alberta to be protected. The proposed protected section only protects 800 km^{2} (310 sq mi) of the 5,000 km^{2} (1,900 sq mi) of Chinchaga wilderness area. The area protected by the province is mostly "peatland and unproductive, burned-over deciduous forest".

The Alberta Land and Forest Division leased an additional 450 sq mi (1,200 km^{2}) of the land set aside as the Chinchaga Special Place to Manning Diversified Forest Products Ltd. as a timber license. In 2000, the provincial government authorized logging by Daishowa-Marubeni and Manning Diversified Forest Products in another part of Chinchaga shortly after giving the wildpark area protected status.

The Biophysical Inventory of Chinchaga Wildland Park was released in March 2002.

In June 2002 the Alberta Government claimed it had "no plans to re-open discussion" about enlarging the Chinchaga Special Place.

the Special Places program fully achieved it target with regards to the protection of the Central Mixedwood natural sub-region, established a total of 81 new and 13 expanded sites, and brought Alberta’s total protected land base to 12.5%, which he called "... a significant environmental achievement for all Albertans". In reply to the Minister’s response, AWA points out that Chinchaga lies in the Foothills Region rather than the Central Mixedwood subregion of the Boreal Region. Only 2% of the Foothills region is protected. Additionally, AWA notes that 2/3 of the 12.5% of protected land in Alberta is federally protected. A meager 4% of provincially protected area represents "a slightly less 'significant achievement for all Albertans.'

— AWS 2014a

In 2003 the Alberta Wilderness Association, the Federation of Alberta Naturalists, the Sierra Club of Canada, Canadian Nature Federation and the Natural Resources Defense Council in the U.S. called for a "moratorium on further development in Chinchaga until permanent protection is established".

== Ecology ==
The park protects an example of the Upper and Lower Boreal highlands subregion of the Boreal Forest natural region of Alberta. In the National Ecological Framework for Canada used by Environment and Climate Change Canada, the park is in the Chinchaga Plain and Clear Hills Upland ecodistricts of the Clear Hills Upland ecoregion in the Boreal Foothills ecoprovince of the Boreal Plains Ecozone.

=== Climate ===
The Köppen climate classification of the park is Continental, Subarctic (Dfc) characterized by long, cold winters, and short, warm to cool summers. Using the data from nearby weather stations surrounding the park (Doig Lookout, Shell Hamberg, and Hotchkiss Auto), average daily temperatures for the period 1991-2020 exceed 10 °C (50 °F) only for June, July, and August while average daily temperatures are less than 0 °C (32 °F) for November through March. Over the same years, the long-run average precipitation for the wettest months, June and July, is 90 to 115 millimetres (3.5 to 4.5 in) per month; conversely, it is less than 40 millimetres (1.6 in) per month from October through April.

=== Environment ===
The environment consists of diverse landscapes and vegetation ecosystems including boreal forests and muskeg, with deciduous and coniferous forests mixed with wetlands and fens. This provides habitat for woodland caribou (Rangifer tarandus) and trumpeter swan (Cygnus buccinator) which are Endangered Species in Alberta and grizzly bear (Ursus arctos). These along beaver (Castor canadensis) and northern goshawk (Accipiter gentiles), are considered to be the focal wildlife species in the Park. Other species include including, muskrat (Ondatra zibethicus), marten (Martes americana), fisher (Martes pennant), moose (Alces alces), wolf (Canis lupus), lynx (Lynx canadensis), pileated woodpecker (Dryocopus pileatus), and numerous other small mammals, furbearers, raptors, songbirds, and waterfowl.

=== Boreal woodland caribou ===
The park is contained within the range of the Chinchaga herd of woodland caribou. Caribou are considered a species "at risk" of declining due to non-viable population levels and are designated as "threatened" under the Alberta Wildlife Act. Nationally, the status of woodland caribou varies considerably across the species’ range, with Alberta populations listed as "threatened". The boreal ecotype of woodland caribou that inhabit Chinchaga Wildland Park and adjacent areas are largely restricted to peatland complexes. They require large home ranges and distinct calving and wintering areas that extend beyond the current Park boundaries. The 2002 report recommended that "habitat units that have been identified as Caribou Habitat ESAs within Chinchaga Wildland Park should also be extrapolated and managed accordingly in areas outside and adjacent to the Park".

== See also ==
- List of Alberta provincial parks
- List of Canadian provincial parks
- List of National Parks of Canada
