= Cleardale =

- Hamlet
- Location of Cleardale in Alberta Cleardale (Canada) Cleardale (North America)
- Coordinates: 56.3353°N 119.5881°W
- Country: Canada
- Province: Alberta
- Census division: No. 17
- Municipal district: Clear Hills County

Government
  - Type: Unincorporated
  - Governing body: Clear Hills County Council

Population (2008)
  - Total: 19
- Time zone: UTC−06:00 (Alberta Time)

Cleardale is a hamlet in northern Alberta, Canada within Clear Hills County. It is located on Highway 64 approximately 29 kilometres (18 mi) east of the British Columbia border and 98 kilometres (61 mi) northwest of Fairview.

The hamlet is located in census division No. 17. The area was formally surveyed in 1953.

== Climate ==
Climate data for Cleardale
Month	Jan	Feb	Mar	Apr	May	Jun	Jul	Aug	Sep	Oct	Nov	Dec	Year
Record high °C (°F)	12.0 (53.6)	11.1 (52.0)	14.4 (57.9)	28.9 (84.0)	31.5 (88.7)	32.2 (90.0)	32.2 (90.0)	34.5 (94.1)	31.0 (87.8)	26.0 (78.8)	15.6 (60.1)	10.0 (50.0)	34.5 (94.1)
Mean daily maximum °C (°F)	−11.0 (12.2)	−6.0 (21.2)	0.7 (33.3)	9.2 (48.6)	16.5 (61.7)	20.4 (68.7)	22.2 (72.0)	21.3 (70.3)	16.0 (60.8)	7.5 (45.5)	−4.4 (24.1)	−9.4 (15.1)	6.9 (44.4)
Daily mean °C (°F)	−16.2 (2.8)	−12.0 (10.4)	−5.8 (21.6)	2.9 (37.2)	9.3 (48.7)	13.6 (56.5)	15.5 (59.9)	14.4 (57.9)	9.3 (48.7)	2.0 (35.6)	−9.2 (15.4)	−14.4 (6.1)	0.8 (33.4)
Mean daily minimum °C (°F)	−21.4 (−6.5)	−18.0 (−0.4)	−12.2 (10.0)	−3.4 (25.9)	2.1 (35.8)	6.8 (44.2)	8.8 (47.8)	7.4 (45.3)	2.6 (36.7)	−3.5 (25.7)	−14.0 (6.8)	−19.4 (−2.9)	−5.4 (22.3)
Record low °C (°F)	−51.2 (−60.2)	−46.1 (−51.0)	−42.8 (−45.0)	−27.0 (−16.6)	−12.0 (10.4)	−2.2 (28.0)	−1.1 (30.0)	−4.0 (24.8)	−20.0 (−4.0)	−31.5 (−24.7)	−39.0 (−38.2)	−51.0 (−59.8)	−51.2 (−60.2)
Average precipitation mm (inches)	29.2 (1.15)	16.9 (0.67)	20.1 (0.79)	20.9 (0.82)	37.7 (1.48)	70.8 (2.79)	82.4 (3.24)	64.9 (2.56)	37.6 (1.48)	26.9 (1.06)	26.5 (1.04)	21.7 (0.85)	455.6 (17.94)
Average rainfall mm (inches)	0.3 (0.01)	0.0 (0.0)	0.2 (0.01)	11.7 (0.46)	35.1 (1.38)	70.8 (2.79)	82.4 (3.24)	64.9 (2.56)	36.9 (1.45)	16.9 (0.67)	1.5 (0.06)	0.2 (0.01)	320.9 (12.63)
Average snowfall cm (inches)	28.9 (11.4)	16.9 (6.7)	20.0 (7.9)	9.2 (3.6)	2.6 (1.0)	0.0 (0.0)	0.0 (0.0)	0.0 (0.0)	0.8 (0.3)	10.0 (3.9)	25.0 (9.8)	21.5 (8.5)	134.8 (53.1)
Source: Environment Canada

== Demographics ==
The population of Cleardale according to the 2008 municipal census conducted by Clear Hills County is 19.

== Education ==
Menno Simons Community School, a K-12 public school under the jurisdiction of the Peace River School Division, is located in Cleardale.

== See also ==
- List of communities in Alberta
- List of hamlets in Alberta
