= Notikewin River =

- Location within Alberta

Location
- Country: Canada
- Province: Alberta

Physical characteristics
- Source: Clear Hills
  - location: Clear Hills County
  - coordinates: 56.66594°N 119.43978°W
  - elevation: 1,055 m (3,461 ft)
- Mouth: Peace River
  - location: about 35 km (22 mi) north of Manning
  - coordinates: 57.27938°N 117.13529°W
  - elevation: 275 m (902 ft)
- Basin size: 9,799 km^{2} (3,783 sq mi)

Basin features
- Progression: Peace→ Slave→ Mackenzie
- River system: Mackenzie River basin

The Notikewin River is a tributary of the Peace River in northern Alberta, Canada. The Notikewin Provincial Park is established at the mouth of the river.

The name derives from nôtinikewin (ᓅᑎᓂᑫᐃᐧᐣ), the Cree word for "battle", referring to a battle between the Cree and Dane-zaa First Nations. In the past, the English equivalent, Battle River, was also used for the river. The name is shared with the settlement of Notikewin, and is lent to the Notikewin Member, a stratigraphical unit of the Western Canadian Sedimentary Basin.

== Geography ==
The Notikewin River originates in the Clear Hills of northern Alberta, north of Worsley, at an elevation of 1,055 meters (3,461 ft). It flows in east and north-east direction, along the southern slopes of the Halverson Ridge, where it receives the waters from the Square Creek and Alleman Creek. It turns east and receives waters from the Rambling Creek, Lovet Creek and Jim Creek.

It meanders through the town of Manning, where it is crossed by the Mackenzie Highway and Railink Mackenzie Northern Railway. The settlement of Notikewin is situated immediately north of Manning. The river continues north-east through the Peace Country, receiving the waters of Stowe Creek, Soldar Creek and Hotchkiss River. It continues north-east between Highway 741 and Highway 692, where the Meikle River and Gravina Creek merge into the river, east of Hawk Hills. The river turns east, enters the Notikewin Provincial Park and finally empties into the Peace River at an elevation of 275 meters (902 ft).

At the town of Manning, the Notikewin River has a mean flow of 13.0 cubic metres per second (460 cu ft/s). Mean minimal flow at Manning is 0.818 cubic metres per second (28.9 cu ft/s) and mean maximum flow is 54.7 cubic metres per second (1,930 cu ft/s). Record maximum flow was 190 cubic metres per second (6,700 cu ft/s) in May 2022.

=== Tributaries ===
- Square Creek
- Alleman Creek
- Rambling Creek
- Lovet Creek
- Jim Creek
- Stowe Creek
- Soldar Creek
- Hotchkiss River
- Meikle River
- Gravina Creek

== History ==
In 1866, the Hudson's Bay Company (HBC) set up a fur trade post at the mouth of the Notikewin River, on the Peace River. The post, called Battle River or Battle River House, was rebuilt in 1875 and was closed in 1886, but reopened the following year. It served as a wintering outpost of Lesser Slave Lake. In 1897, the post closed permanently.

Logging and settlement of the Notikewin basin began in the 1920s. Many homesteaders were returning veterans of World War I.

== See also ==
- List of rivers of Alberta
