= Twin Lakes, Alberta =

Twin Lakes
- Unincorporated Area
- Location of Twin Lakes in Alberta
- Coordinates: 57°26′24″N 117°31′10″W
- Country: Canada
- Province: Alberta
- Census division: No. 17
- Municipal district: County of Northern Lights

Government
  - Type: Unincorporated
  - Governing body: County of Northern Lights Council
- Time zone: UTC−06:00 (Alberta Time)

Twin Lakes is an unincorporated area in the Canadian province of Alberta. It is located in Northern Alberta. It is located in census division no. 17 and is under the jurisdiction of the County of Northern Lights.

It is located along the Mackenzie Highway (Highway 35), approximately 61 kilometres (38 mi) north of the Town of Manning.
