= Alberta Highway 64 =

Highway in Alberta, Canada

Highway 64

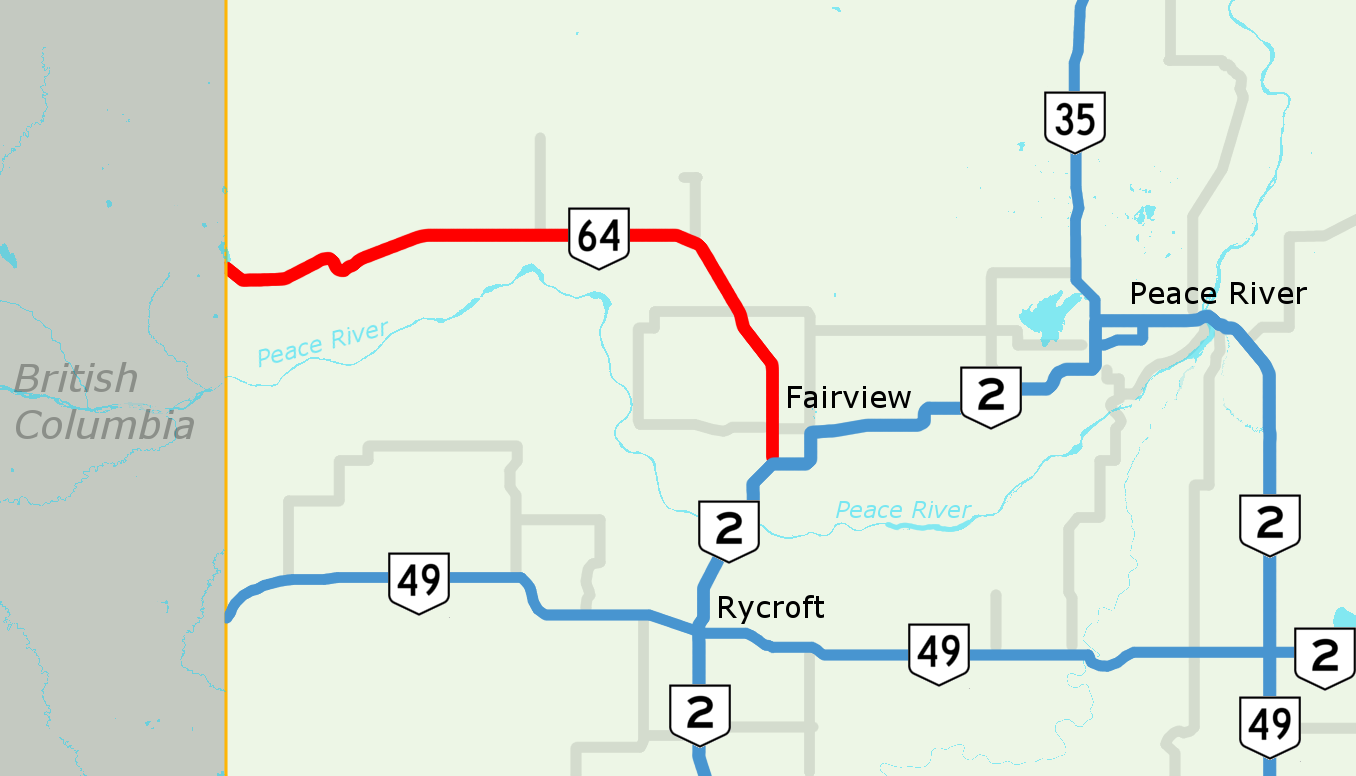
- Highway 64 highlighted in red

Route information
- Maintained by the Ministry of Transportation and Economic Corridors
- Length: 126.03 km (78.31 mi)

Major junctions
- West end: British Columbia border
- East end: Highway 2 southwest of Fairview

Location
- Country: Canada
- Province: Alberta
- Specialized and rural municipalities: Clear Hills County, Fairview No. 136 M.D.
- Villages: Hines Creek

Highway system
- Alberta Provincial Highway Network; List; Former
← Highway 63	→ Highway 66

Alberta Provincial Highway No. 64 is an east-west highway in northern Alberta, Canada. In the west, Highway 64 begins at the Alberta/British Columbia border and ends at Highway 2 southwest of the Town of Fairview.

== Major intersections ==
Rural/specialized municipality	Location	km	mi	Destinations	Notes
Clear Hills County		0.0	0.0	Cecil Lake Road (Highway 908:1189 west) – Cecil Lake, Fort St. John	Continues into British Columbia; unofficially Highway 103
Clear Hills County		12.1	7.5	Highway 717 south – Bear Canyon, Cherry Point	
Clear Hills County		57.5	35.7	Highway 726 north – Worsley	
Clear Hills County		83.7	52.0	Highway 730 north – Eureka River	
Clear Hills County	Hines Creek	97.7	60.7	Highway 685	
M.D. of Fairview No. 136		119.3	74.1	Highway 64A east / Highway 682 west – Fairview	
M.D. of Fairview No. 136		126.0	78.3	Highway 2 – Peace River, Grande Prairie	
1.000 mi = 1.609 km; 1.000 km = 0.621 mi: Route transition

== Highway 64A ==
Highway 64A
- Location: M.D. of Fairview No. 136, Town of Fairview
- Length: 6.64 km (4.13 mi)

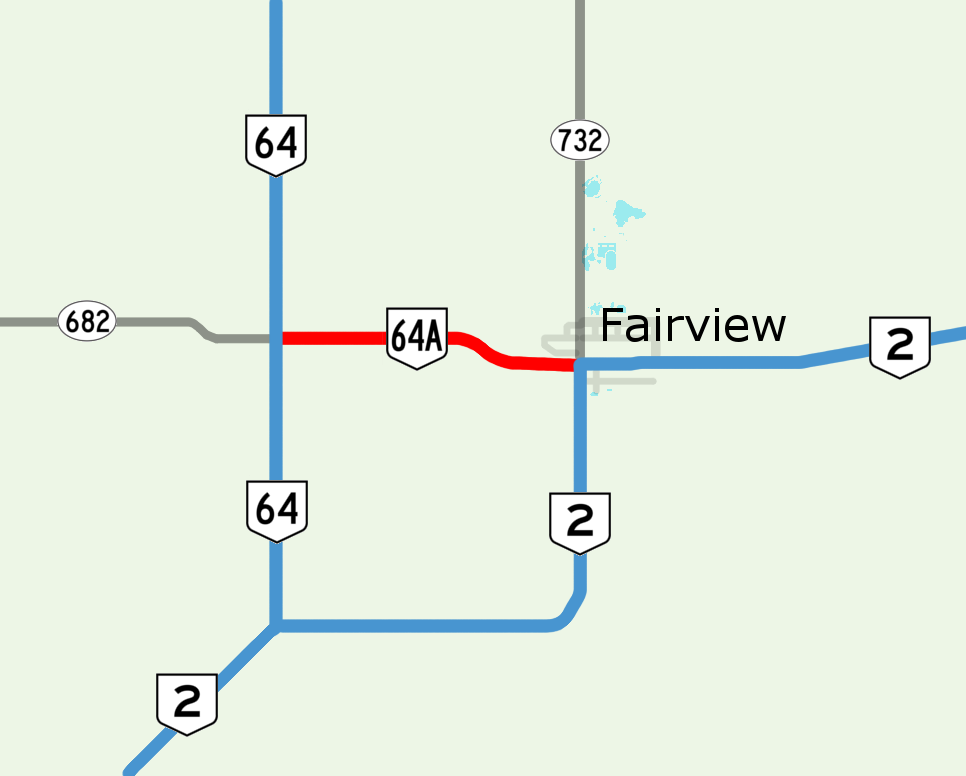
Highway 64A in Fairview, Alberta

Alberta Provincial Highway No. 64A is the designation of an alternate route off Highway 64 serving the Town of Fairview. It extends 7 km (4.3 mi) from its intersection with Highway 64/Highway 682 in the west to its intersection with Highway 2/Highway 732 within Fairview in the east.

=== Major intersections ===
Location	mi	km	Destinations	Notes
M.D. of Fairview No. 136	0.00	0.00	Highway 64 / Highway 682 west – Rycroft, Hines Creek, Fort St. John	Western terminus; continues as Highway 682
Fairview	6.64	4.13	Highway 2 / Highway 732 north (113 Street) – Peace River, Rycroft	Eastern terminus; continues as Highway 2 north
1.000 mi = 1.609 km; 1.000 km = 0.621 mi
