= Figure Eight Lake Provincial Recreation Area =

Lake in Northern Lights, Canada

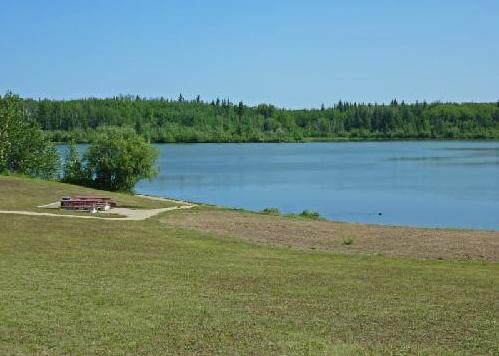

- Location within Alberta
- Location: County of Northern Lights, Alberta, Canada
- Nearest city: Peace River
- Coordinates: 56°18′17″N 117°54′23″W
- Area: 0.37 km^{2} (0.14 sq mi)
- Governing body: Alberta Environment

Figure Eight Lake Provincial Recreation Area is located 40 kilometers northwest of Peace River on Highway 737 (off Highway 35) in the County of Northern Lights. Figure Eight Lake takes its name from the shape it had before 1970 when the water level was low; in these earlier days the lake had two basins and resembled a figure eight. It drains through a weir south to Lac Cardinal that was raised in order to create the lake. The control structure and recreational facilities at the lake are now operated and maintained by Alberta Environment.

The lake is stocked annually with rainbow trout. Because of the lake's small size, gas-powered motors are not allowed on the lake.

The first roads into the region were opened in 1926.

== Activities ==
It has a picnic shelter, camping, boat launch, fishing, playground and hiking trails.

== See also ==
- List of Alberta provincial parks
- List of Canadian provincial parks
- List of National Parks of Canada
