= Carcajou, Alberta =

Carcajou
- Unincorporated community
- Location of Carcajou in Alberta
- Coordinates: 57.7669°N 117.0400°W
- Country: Canada
- Province: Alberta
- Census division: No. 17
- Municipal district: County of Northern Lights

Government
  - Type: Unincorporated
  - Governing body: County of Northern Lights Council
- Time zone: UTC−06:00 (Alberta Time)

Carcajou is an unincorporated community in Alberta, Canada. It is located in northern Alberta, on the banks of the Peace River, north of Manning. Carcajou is a French word meaning wolverine.

Carcajou is located in census division No. 17 and is administered by the County of Northern Lights.

== History ==
Carcajou sits on the Peace River, whose name references a historical peace agreement between the Dane-zaa (Beaver) and the Cree. The river was not just a reminder of the peace agreement but represented the boundary between the two peoples’ territories, and was the site of gatherings between the two groups to “meet for trade, celebration and the settling of disputes.” A precolonial burial ground, now in Carcajou lot 187, has been recorded since the earliest incursions of settlers. According to the traditions of the First Nations in the area, this suggest that the current site of Carcajou was one such place and was likely considered to be sacred. The Peace River valley was an essential source of fish, such as the burbot, as well as berries and other medicines, for the Indigenous peoples of this territory. The river itself also acted as an important corridor for travel, both in the summer and the winter, using snowshoes. Wild game also made use of this corridor, making it an important location for hunting and trapping, as well.

Originally the settlement of Carcajou was on the east side of the Peace River and called Wolverine Point by the fur traders. The settlement was established by J. B. La Fleur in 1798 for the Northwest Company to trade with the Beaver tribe.

The settlement played a role in the competition between the Northwest Company and Hudson's Bay Company between 1812 and 1815.
