= Mary Percy =

Mary Percy may refer to:

- Mary Percy, Countess of Northumberland, née Talbot, (?–1572), English courtier and noblewoman
- Mary Percy (abbess) (1570–1642), English noblewoman
- Mary Percy Jackson, née Mary Percy, (1904–2000), English medical practitioner in Canada
- Mary Percy Schenck (1917–2005), American costume designer
- Mary Fitz (also Percy) (1596–1671), English noblewoman
