= Notikewin Provincial Park =

Provincial park in Alberta, Canada

- IUCN category II (national park)
- Location within Alberta
- Interactive map of Notikewin Provincial Park
- Location: County of Northern Lights, Alberta, Canada
- Nearest city: Manning, Peace River
- Coordinates: 57°13′14″N 117°08′25″W
- Area: 119 km^{2} (46 sq mi)
- Established: November 20, 1979
- Governing body: Alberta Tourism, Parks and Recreation

Notikewin Provincial Park is a provincial park located in northwestern Alberta, Canada, 37 kilometres (23 mi) east of Manning.

The park is located at the confluence of the Peace River (which surrounds the park on three sides) and Notikewin River. Crummy Lake is also located in the park. At almost 120 km^{2} (46 sq mi), it is one of the largest provincial parks in Alberta, and the northernmost to be listed as such (Wood Buffalo National Park and other wildland parks are situated further north).

== Activities ==
The park has amenities for camping on the Peace River beach, at the Notikewin Campground, and two day-use areas, at Notikewin Hilltop and Notikewin Shore. Power boating is allowed. Recreational activities in the park include bird watching and wildlife viewing, canoeing, fishing, front country hiking.

== See also ==
- List of provincial parks in Alberta
- List of Canadian provincial parks
- List of National Parks of Canada
