= Notikewin =

- Hamlet
- Location of Notikewin Notikewin (Canada) Notikewin (North America)
- Coordinates: 56°58′29″N 117°37′30″W
- Country: Canada
- Province: Alberta
- Region: Northern Alberta
- Census division: 17
- Municipal district: County of Northern Lights

Government
  - Type: Unincorporated
  - Governing body: County of Northern Lights Council

Population (1991)
  - Total: 17
- Time zone: UTC−06:00 (Alberta Time)
- Area codes: 780, 587, 825

Notikewin is a hamlet in northern Alberta, Canada within the County of Northern Lights. It is located along the Mackenzie Highway (Highway 35), approximately 6 kilometres (3.7 mi) north of the Town of Manning.

The name derives from nôtinikewin, the Cree word for "battle". The name is shared with the Notikewin River, and is lent to the Notikewin Member, a stratigraphical unit of the Western Canadian Sedimentary Basin.

== Climate ==
Climate data for Notikewin
Month	Jan	Feb	Mar	Apr	May	Jun	Jul	Aug	Sep	Oct	Nov	Dec	Year
Record high °C (°F)	10 (50)	17 (63)	14 (57)	29.4 (84.9)	32.2 (90.0)	34.4 (93.9)	34 (93)	36 (97)	33 (91)	26 (79)	31.5 (88.7)	12 (54)	36 (97)
Mean daily maximum °C (°F)	−12.4 (9.7)	−8.9 (16.0)	−0.2 (31.6)	10.2 (50.4)	17.6 (63.7)	21.4 (70.5)	23 (73)	21.7 (71.1)	15.8 (60.4)	8.6 (47.5)	−4.1 (24.6)	−9.8 (14.4)	6.9 (44.4)
Daily mean °C (°F)	−18.8 (−1.8)	−16.3 (2.7)	−7.7 (18.1)	3 (37)	9.8 (49.6)	14.2 (57.6)	15.9 (60.6)	14.2 (57.6)	8.6 (47.5)	2.1 (35.8)	−9.6 (14.7)	−16 (3)	−0.1 (31.8)
Mean daily minimum °C (°F)	−24.9 (−12.8)	−23.5 (−10.3)	−15.1 (4.8)	−4.3 (24.3)	1.9 (35.4)	6.9 (44.4)	8.8 (47.8)	6.7 (44.1)	1.2 (34.2)	−4.4 (24.1)	−15.1 (4.8)	−22.1 (−7.8)	−7 (19)
Record low °C (°F)	−50.6 (−59.1)	−47.8 (−54.0)	−44.4 (−47.9)	−30.6 (−23.1)	−7.2 (19.0)	−5 (23)	0.5 (32.9)	−3.9 (25.0)	−18.9 (−2.0)	−33 (−27)	−40 (−40)	−47.8 (−54.0)	−50.6 (−59.1)
Average precipitation mm (inches)	23.9 (0.94)	18.4 (0.72)	16.2 (0.64)	13.2 (0.52)	36.5 (1.44)	66 (2.6)	71.3 (2.81)	51.1 (2.01)	35.7 (1.41)	21.5 (0.85)	20.7 (0.81)	16.5 (0.65)	390.9 (15.39)
Source: Environment Canada

== Demographics ==
Notikewin recorded a population of 17 in the 1991 Census of Population conducted by Statistics Canada.

== See also ==
- List of communities in Alberta
- List of hamlets in Alberta
