= Chinook Valley, Alberta =

Coordinates: 56°28′48″N 117°39′46″W

Location of Chinook Valley Alberta

Chinook Valley is an unincorporated community in northern Alberta under the jurisdiction of the County of Northern Lights.

It is located along the Mackenzie Highway (Highway 35), approximately 34 kilometres (21 mi) north of the Town of Grimshaw and 52 kilometres (32 mi) south of the Town of Manning. Its first school was established in 1929.
