= Deadwood, Alberta =

Hamlet in Alberta, Canada

Deadwood
- Hamlet
- Location of Deadwood Deadwood (Canada)
- Coordinates: 56°44′28″N 117°27′28″W
- Country: Canada
- Province: Alberta
- Region: Northern Alberta
- Census division: 17
- Municipal district: County of Northern Lights

Government
  - Type: Unincorporated
  - Governing body: County of Northern Lights Council

Population (1991)
  - Total: 22
- Time zone: UTC−06:00 (Alberta Time)
- Area codes: 780, 587, 825

Deadwood is a hamlet in Alberta, Canada within the County of Northern Lights. It is located on Highway 690, approximately 10 kilometres (6.2 mi) east of the Mackenzie Highway (Highway 35), 80 kilometres (50 mi) north of Peace River and 34 kilometres (21 mi) southeast of Manning.

== History ==
John Chauncey Eggenberger was the first postmaster and proprietor of the first general store. He was from Deadwood, South Dakota, and left with two cars of settlers to homestead deadwood in 1931. The original store, post office and community hall were located a few miles west of the present day hamlet. The first town hall was demolished in 1936. The current hall was constructed in February 1979, primarily through volunteer labor.

On Saturday, August 19, 2006, in the evening (with a number of people gathered for the Deadwood Days ball tournament watching) a single-engine Cessna 177 piloted by Manning businessman Nick Gudzinski, 49, crashed less than a kilometre south of the hamlet. The pilot and all three of the teenaged passengers were killed. All were residents of the Manning area some 21 kilometers northwest of Deadwood. One of the passengers was Mr. Gudzinski's son; another was his son's girlfriend, and the remaining was the girlfriend's brother.

On February 20, 2017, 37 illegal firearms were seized from a farmer in a home in Deadwood. Two days later, police went back to the property and recovered two stolen sports cars and some cocaine.

== Demographics ==
Deadwood recorded a population of 22 in the 1991 Census of Population conducted by Statistics Canada.

== Amenities ==
The hamlet consists of a community hall, baseball diamond, post office, small store, and several houses. The post office, store "School Daze" and pool room are all contained within the building that was the Deadwood School. The Deadwood United Church continues as an active preaching point of the Manning-Deadwood Shared Ministry. At one time there was a service station, blacksmith shop and at least one other church. Deadwood had a number of baseball teams in the 1950s and early 1960s and competed in the Mackenzie Highway Baseball League against a number of other teams in the area.

== Events ==
Annual community events have included:

- "Deadwood Days" in the summer with a softball tournament, and sometimes a parade and a very small fair;
- "The Fall Supper" as in many rural communities in North America, is usually held in late October in the community hall; and
- "Deadwood Talent Night" in the spring, held in the community hall, showcasing an eclectic and sometimes astonishing range of talents from the Manning-Deadwood and Dixonville area.

== Notable people ==
Deadwood is the hometown of country singer Carolyn Dawn Johnson.

== See also ==
- List of communities in Alberta
- List of hamlets in Alberta
