= Weberville =

Unincorporated rural community in Alberta, Canada

- Unincorporated community
- Location of Weberville in Alberta
- Coordinates: 56.3348°N 117.3467°W
- Country: Canada
- Province: Alberta
- Census division: No. 17
- Municipal district: County of Northern Lights

Government
  - Type: Unincorporated
  - Governing body: County of Northern Lights Council
- Highest elevation.: 539 m (1,768 ft)
- Lowest elevation: 501 m (1,644 ft)
- Time zone: UTC-7 (MST)

Weberville is an unincorporated rural community in northern Alberta, Canada. The community hall and volunteer fire department are located on Highway 743 (Weberville Road), 11.5 km (8 mi) north of Highway 2 at Peace River, or 19.8 km (12 mi) east and 3.2 km (2 mi) south of Highway 35 / Highway 986 junction. Most services are located 12 km south in Peace River.

The community is located in census division No. 17 and in the federal riding of Peace River. It is administered by the County of Northern Lights.

== History ==
The district is named for the first postmaster J.J. (Jack) Weber The Weberville School district #4380 was formed in 1928 and the schoolhouse built during the winter of 1928-29, the original building still stands behind the community hall.

== See also ==
- List of communities in Alberta
