= North Star, Alberta =

North Star
- Hamlet
- Location of North Star in Alberta
- Coordinates: 56.8564°N 117.6153°W
- Country: Canada
- Province: Alberta
- Census division: No. 17
- Municipal district: County of Northern Lights

Government
  - Type: Unincorporated
  - Governing body: County of Northern Lights Council
- Elevation: 490 m (1,610 ft)
- 49
- Time zone: UTC−06:00 (Alberta Time)

North Star is a hamlet in northern Alberta, Canada within the County of Northern Lights. It is located on the Mackenzie Highway (Highway 35), approximately 7 kilometres (4.3 mi) south of Manning. It has an elevation of 490 metres (1,610 ft).

The hamlet is located in Census Division No. 17 and in the federal riding of Peace River.

== Demographics ==
Population history of North Star
Year	Pop.	±%
1941	90	—
1951	100	+11.1%
1956	109	+9.0%
1961	87	−20.2%
1966	90	+3.4%
1971	87	−3.3%
1976	33	−62.1%
1981	86	+160.6%
1986	52	−39.5%
1991	49	−5.8%
Source: Statistics Canada

North Star recorded a population of 49 in the 1991 Census of Population conducted by Statistics Canada.

== See also ==
- List of communities in Alberta
- List of hamlets in Alberta
