= Chinchaga River =

River in Alberta, Canada

Coordinates: 58°52′19″N 118°18′50″W

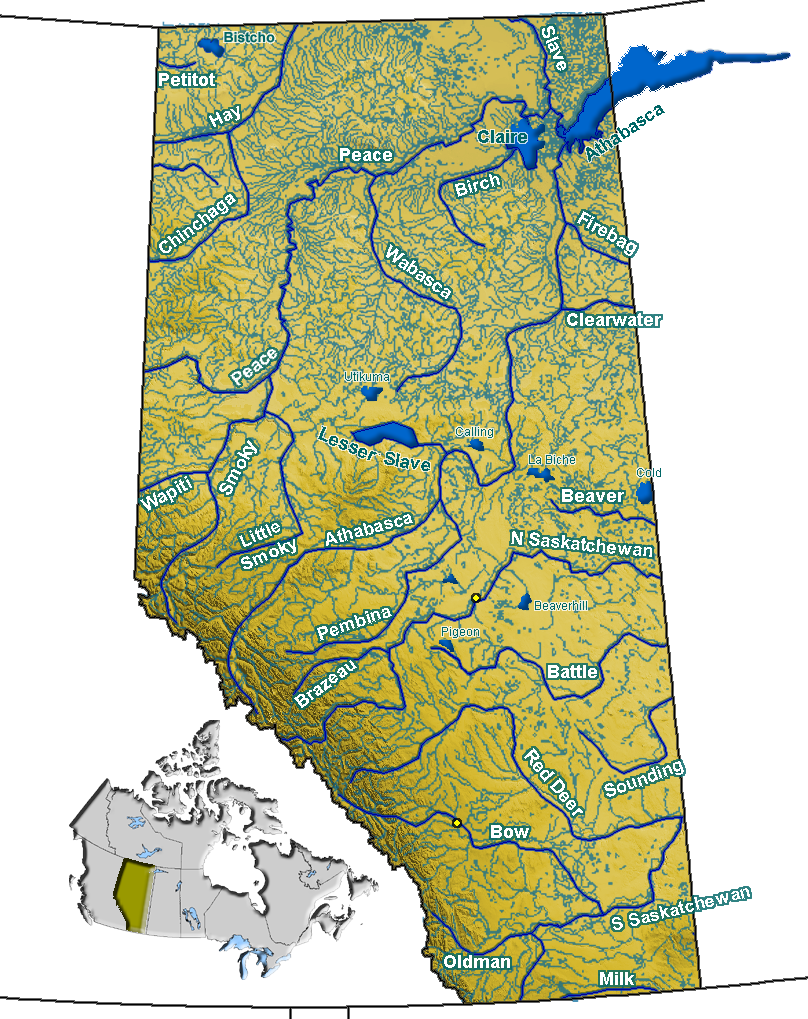
Chinchaga River in Alberta

Chinchaga is a river in north-western Alberta. It is a tributary of the Hay River. Through the Hay River, its waters are carried to the Arctic Ocean via Great Slave Lake and Mackenzie River. The name Chinchaga is First Nations, and means "Big Wood River". Much of the Chinchaga watershed burned in 1950 during the Chinchaga fire.

== Course ==
Chinchaga River originates in the Chinchaga Lakes, a series of small lakes in the muskeg of north-eastern British Columbia, at an elevation of 795 m. It flows east into Alberta, then continues north-east until west of Keg River, where it turns north. It merges into the Hay River between Zama Lake and High Level, at an altitude of 325 m. A series of oxbow lakes are formed on the lower course. The approximate length of the river is 500 km, and the average discharge at its confluence with Hay River is 30 m^{3}/s.

== Tributaries ==
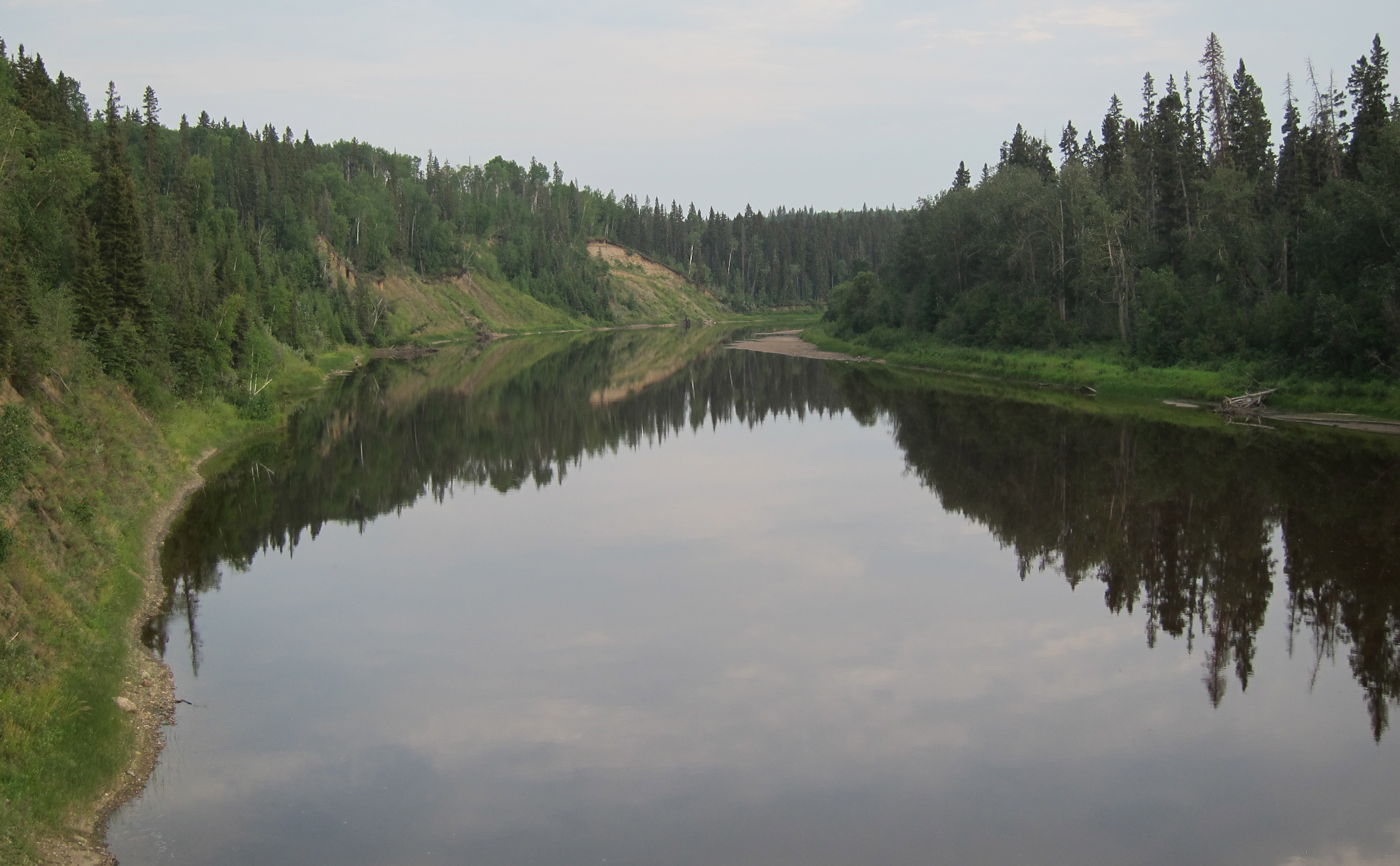
Chinchaga River near Highway 58

- Lennard Creek
- Tanghe Creek
- Werniuck Creek
- Sloat Creek
- Vader Creek
- Thordarson Creek
- Waniandy Creek
- Haro River
- Haig River

== Conservation and development ==
Chinchaga Wildland Park is a large tract of land set aside at the end of 1999 by the Alberta Government for protection of the habitat of grizzly bears and woodland caribou, as well as nesting sites of trumpeter swan. However, the rest of the Chinchaga area is a well known hunting ground. Significant oil and gas fields (such as Hamburg) and logging are developed in the area.

== See also ==
- Geography of Alberta
- List of Alberta rivers
