= Chinchaga fire =

1950 forest fire in British Columbia and Alberta

Coordinates: 57.42°N 119.80°W

Chinchaga Fire
- Date: June - October 1950
- Location: British Columbia and Alberta, Canada

Statistics
- Total area: 14,000–17,000 square kilometres (3,500,000–4,200,000 acres)

Map
- Perimeter of Chinchaga fire (map data)

The Chinchaga fire, also known as the Wisp fire, Chinchaga River fire and Fire 19, was a forest fire that burned in northern British Columbia and Alberta in the summer and early fall of 1950. With a final size of between 14,000 and 17,000 square kilometres (3,500,000 and 4,200,000 acres; 5,400 and 6,600 mi^{2}), it is the single largest recorded fire in North American history. The authorities allowed the fire to burn freely, following local forest management policy considering the lack of settlements in the region. The Chinchaga fire produced large amounts of smoke, creating the "1950 Great Smoke Pall", observed across eastern North America and Europe. As the existence of the massive fire was not well-publicized, and the smoke was mostly in the upper atmosphere and could not be smelled, there was much speculation about the atmospheric haze and its provenance. The Chinchaga firestorm's "historic smoke pall" caused "observations of blue suns and moons in the United States and Europe". It was the biggest firestorm documented in North America, and created the world's largest smoke layer in the atmosphere.

== Background and cause ==
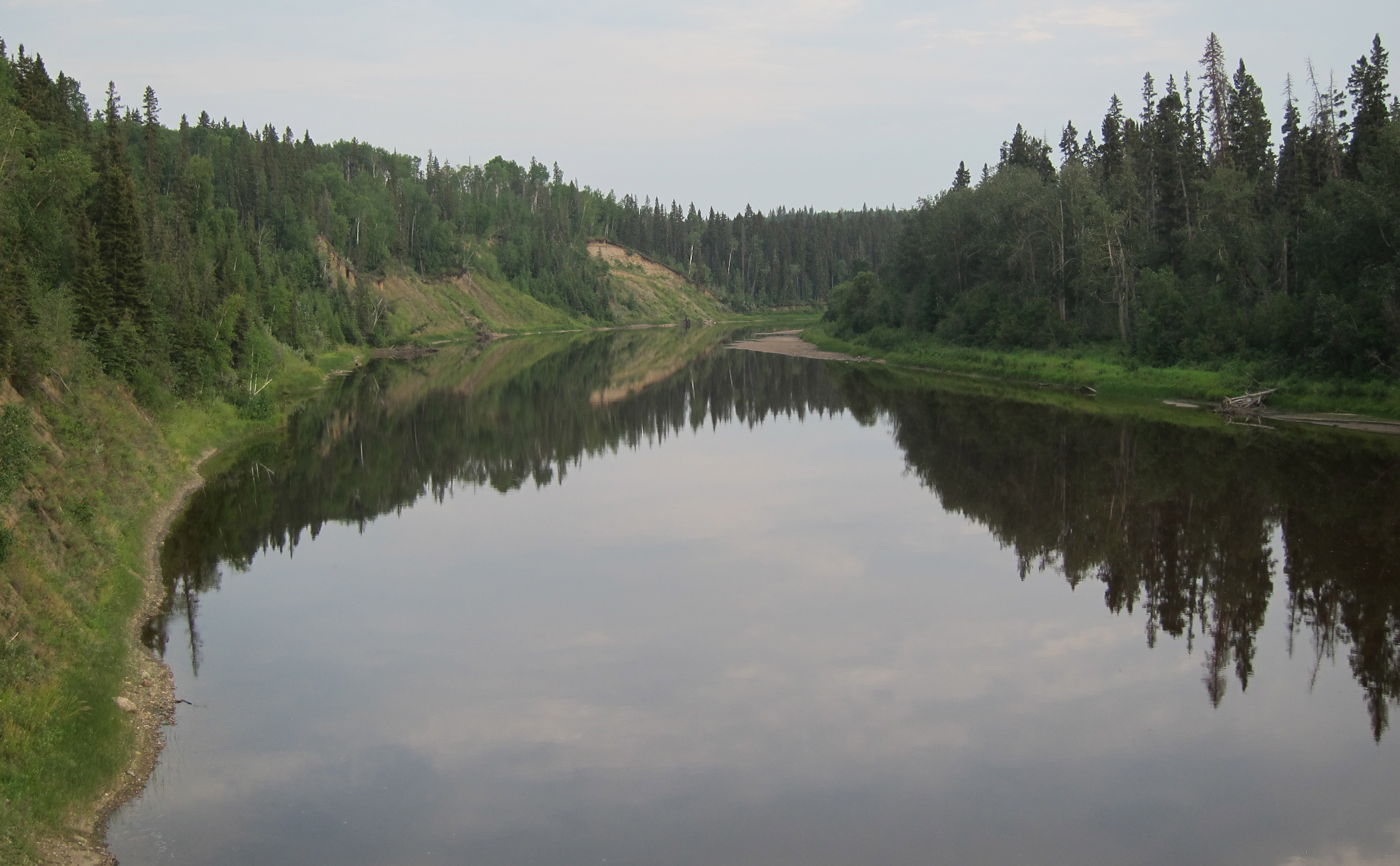
Chinchaga River

The Chinchaga River region has a mix of black spruce, lodgepole pine and deciduous forests, giving way to muskeg in lower areas. Few people lived in the area in 1950.

Sources vary as to the origin of the fire but agree that it was caused by human activity. One version faults an Imperial Oil surveying crew with starting a small blaze to protect their horses from biting insects. Another posits that slash burning from agricultural clearing could have been the initial spark.

The blaze started on 1 June 1950, and continued to burn throughout the summer and early fall until the end of October. The ignition point was north of Fort St. John, British Columbia, and the fire burned north-eastwards nearly to Keg River, Alberta.

== The burn ==
The path and extent of the burn was influenced by weather patterns. It burned in a fan-shaped pattern along a roughly southwest-northeast axis, starting in the Rose Prairie area. The fire alternated between "runs" of rapid spread and high intensity, interspersed with periods of low activity. A series of high pressure systems over the summer allowed a buildup of heat and dry air, reducing the moisture levels in the forest fuels. The breakdowns of these systems produced the high southwesterly winds that drove the "runs".

There were five "runs" in total, with the final expansion in September 1950 causing the most destruction and amounting to one-third of the total burned area. The fire finally was put out by cooler weather and rain in late October, as it approached Keg River in the Whispering River area (hence one of its names "Whisp Fire").

Most of the burned area was on the Alberta side of the inter-provincial border, with only 900 square kilometres (220,000 acres) burned on the British Columbia side. Size estimates vary due to its remoteness from population centres and the imprecise measurement techniques of the time period. Estimates at the time ranged from 10,000 to 14,000 square kilometres (2,500,000 to 3,500,000 acres). In 2008 and 2009, researchers with Natural Resources Canada and the University of Victoria conducted airborne surveys of several boreal forest fires, including the Chinchaga. Using polarimetric analysis, they arrived at a final estimate that was considerably larger than previous estimates, placing the total burned area at 17,000 square kilometres (4,200,000 acres). While most likely not the largest fire ever in North America, maybe not even in the North American boreal forest, the burnt area it produced is the largest ever known.

No known deaths occurred as a result of the fire. In terms of damage, the dollar value of the Chinchaga fire is difficult to estimate. Although sparsely inhabited, the area was a productive trapping area for First Nations and Métis. The timber of the Chinchaga River watershed had not been surveyed and was undervalued by the Alberta provincial government, which placed the fire's cost at one million dollars. Cordy Tymstra, an Alberta forestry department fire historian, said it is a "value that reflects how little officials appreciated the wealth of the land."

Fromm and colleagues argued in 2005 that the Chinchaga firestorm may have been an iteration of an explosive troposphere-to-stratosphere transport (TST), "a dynamic combination of extreme boreal forest fire and convection [...]"

=== Response ===
No fire suppression efforts were directed at the fire. Fire crews were spread thin because of numerous blazes in B.C., the Yukon Territory and Alberta. At the time, the Alberta forestry department's policy was to respond only to fires within 16 kilometres (10 miles) of settlements and major roads. A request by the fire ranger at Keg River to fight the fire with a ground crew was denied by provincial fire managers. According to Tymstra, the Chinchaga fire changed the way Alberta responded to forest fires.

Local residents, such as Frank Jackson, the husband of legendary pioneer doctor Mary Percy Jackson, did what they could but the fire only stalled with the coming of autumn precipitation.

== Great Smoke Pall ==
The Chinchaga fire produced large amounts of smoke, creating the "Great Smoke Pall", observed across eastern North America and Europe. The giant smoke release from the conflagration in late September 1950 was first recorded at Ennadai Lake, in what is now Nunavut, on 24 September. The smoke was on a northeastern path, but hit an atmospheric trough and headed southward towards Ontario and the American eastern seaboard.

The province of Ontario experienced heavy smoke conditions that caused pitch darkness. The towns of Sarnia and Guelph experienced three-hour midday periods of darkness, streetlights in Toronto turned on by themselves, and drivers resorted to using their automobile headlights during daytime hours. In Toronto, power consumption increased by 200 MWh during the smoke event, causing power failures that in turn set off bank alarms, prompting police responses across the city. Aircraft were grounded, and an aerial search for a downed United States Air Force bomber in Labrador was delayed by the smoke. Animals also felt the effects; cows required milking at different times, and birds were seen bedding down midday. Beneficially, the smoke blanket held off a killing frost that was expected in southern Ontario, saving the orchards.

Most of the smoke in eastern North America was borne aloft by climatic conditions to high altitudes. As many observers could not smell it, and the news of the massive Chinchaga fire was sparse, affected people drew other conclusions about its source. Explanations included nuclear armageddon, local fires, secret U.S. military experiments, an American atomic bomb blast, supernatural forces, a solar eclipse, and an alien invasion.

The heavy haze moved on to the Atlantic seaboard of the United States; New York, Pennsylvania, Ohio, Washington D.C., Virginia, and Florida all reported effects from the fire, especially on 24 September, so called "Black Sunday". As in Ontario, streetlights turned on during the daytime, and animals showed abnormal behaviour.

American meteorologist Harry Wexler followed the smoke plume closely, collecting data from a wide area of the U.S. He noted that the plume split in two during the event, with one southern plume getting caught in a stagnant anticyclonic pattern that extended the hazy period. Wexler observed lower temperatures as result of sunlight absorption by the smoke; he estimated a 4 °C (6 °F) drop in the Washington, D.C., area.

The northern smoke plume traveled over the Atlantic by way of Newfoundland and Greenland. On 27 September 1950, the plume was observed over Scotland, with reports over England following soon after. France, the Netherlands, Portugal, and Denmark also observed the plume. Reports by pilots put the haze over Europe at 12,000 m (39,000 ft) or more in altitude, higher than observed in North America. In early October, a smoke observation was made on the Aleutian Islands, suggesting that the Chinchaga haze had possibly circled the entire globe.

== See also ==
- List of fires in Canada
- List of wildfires
