= Eureka River, Alberta =

Eureka River
- Location of Eureka River Alberta Eureka River (Canada) Eureka River (North America)
- Coordinates: 56.4514°N 118.7472°W

Eureka River is an unincorporated community in northern Alberta in Clear Hills County, located 10 kilometres (6.2 mi) north of Highway 64, 142 kilometres (88 mi) north of Grande Prairie.

== Climate ==
Climate data for Eureka River
Month	Jan	Feb	Mar	Apr	May	Jun	Jul	Aug	Sep	Oct	Nov	Dec	Year
Record high °C (°F)	8.0 (46.4)	10.6 (51.1)	13.5 (56.3)	29.4 (84.9)	30.6 (87.1)	32.2 (90.0)	33.5 (92.3)	34.0 (93.2)	30.0 (86.0)	25.5 (77.9)	21.0 (69.8)	17.5 (63.5)	34.0 (93.2)
Mean daily maximum °C (°F)	−10.8 (12.6)	−6.4 (20.5)	0.0 (32.0)	9.5 (49.1)	16.5 (61.7)	20.2 (68.4)	22.1 (71.8)	20.7 (69.3)	15.3 (59.5)	7.3 (45.1)	−4.3 (24.3)	−9.1 (15.6)	6.8 (44.2)
Daily mean °C (°F)	−16.9 (1.6)	−13.2 (8.2)	−7.1 (19.2)	2.6 (36.7)	8.9 (48.0)	13.1 (55.6)	15.0 (59.0)	13.4 (56.1)	8.3 (46.9)	1.3 (34.3)	−9.7 (14.5)	−15.1 (4.8)	0.0 (32.0)
Mean daily minimum °C (°F)	−23.0 (−9.4)	−20.0 (−4.0)	−14.2 (6.4)	−4.3 (24.3)	1.2 (34.2)	5.8 (42.4)	7.8 (46.0)	6.1 (43.0)	1.2 (34.2)	−4.7 (23.5)	−15.1 (4.8)	−21.1 (−6.0)	−6.7 (19.9)
Record low °C (°F)	−49.5 (−57.1)	−48.3 (−54.9)	−45.0 (−49.0)	−30.6 (−23.1)	−12.0 (10.4)	−6.0 (21.2)	−1.5 (29.3)	−6.0 (21.2)	−21.7 (−7.1)	−32.5 (−26.5)	−41.0 (−41.8)	−51.0 (−59.8)	−51.0 (−59.8)
Average precipitation mm (inches)	26.2 (1.03)	19.4 (0.76)	19.3 (0.76)	17.9 (0.70)	43.4 (1.71)	73.3 (2.89)	79.2 (3.12)	55.5 (2.19)	32.3 (1.27)	23.4 (0.92)	25.3 (1.00)	21.0 (0.83)	436.2 (17.17)
Average rainfall mm (inches)	0.1 (0.00)	0.4 (0.02)	1.2 (0.05)	9.7 (0.38)	40.2 (1.58)	73.3 (2.89)	79.2 (3.12)	55.5 (2.19)	31.8 (1.25)	13.2 (0.52)	2.3 (0.09)	0.4 (0.02)	307.4 (12.10)
Average snowfall cm (inches)	26.1 (10.3)	19.1 (7.5)	18.0 (7.1)	8.1 (3.2)	3.2 (1.3)	0.0 (0.0)	0.0 (0.0)	0.0 (0.0)	0.5 (0.2)	10.2 (4.0)	23.0 (9.1)	20.6 (8.1)	128.8 (50.7)
Source: Environment Canada
