= Mary Percy Jackson =

English medical practitioner

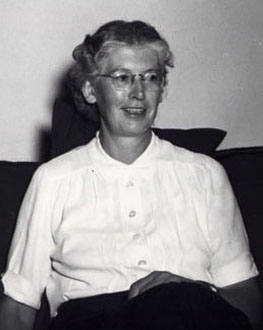
- Born: Mary Percy Jackson; 27 December 1904
- Died: 6 May 2000 (aged 95)

Dr. Mary Percy Jackson, OC, AOE (27 December 1904 – 6 May 2000) was an English medical practitioner in the Canadian province of Alberta based in Keg River and the Peace River Country for 45 years.

== Background ==
Mary Evangeline Percy. was the eldest of four children. Her father, Thomas Arthur Percy, was a wool merchant and tailor in Dudley, England. Many of her family, including her mother Amy Jane Percy (née Chilton), were school teachers. Despite the family tradition of teaching, at the age of eleven she decided she wanted to be a medical doctor. No-one, including Mary herself, knows why she made this choice; her father suggested that she would have made an excellent lawyer because she argued so much. However, in 1915 women were not allowed to be lawyers.

=== Education ===
She graduated from the University of Birmingham in 1927 with degrees in surgery and medicine. She took the Queen's Prize for achieving the highest marks in her class. Over the next two years she served as a house physician at Birmingham General Hospital, casualty house physician in the children's hospital, and house surgeon in the maternity hospital.

She wanted to work in obstetrics in Calcutta, India, a post that only came up every third year. As she graduated in "the wrong year", she had to find other work to fill in the time until she would be able to apply for the Calcutta job. A colleague drew her attention to a job advertisement in the British Medical Journal, seeking a female doctor to serve in Alberta, Canada:

23 February 1929.
Strong energetic Medical Women with post-graduate experience in Midwifery, wanted for country work in Western Canada, under the Provincial Government Department of Health. Apply in first instance to Dr. E.M. Johnstone, c/o Fellowship of the Maple Leaf, 13, Victoria Street, London, SW1.

In reply to her request for further information from Dr. Emma Johnstone, OBE, the reply added that "The ability to ride a saddle horse would be a great advantage". Jackson had previously taken up horse riding at Sutton Coldfield Riding School in a desire for more exercise, although her family said she rarely, if ever, left the indoor arena. When she learned that Alberta had the Rocky Mountains, she was keen to go, not realising how far north she was to be stationed, or the distance to the Rockies. She originally intended her stay in Alberta to be a one-year adventure.

=== Voyage from England ===
The Fellowship of the Maple Leaf organisation were to pay her passage. She travelled to stay with and meet the organisation's founder Canon P. J. Andrews and his wife, also meeting their friend Dr. Johnstone, with whom Mary had had her earlier correspondence. Johnstone gave her the advice "Whatever you do, go to the Dental Hospital a get yourself a week's practice pulling teeth!"

She travelled to Southampton and boarded the RMS Empress of Scotland for a week-long voyage to Québec City, passing around Cape Race on 13 July 1929. A further week-long railway journey took her westwards past Ottawa and Lake Superior across the expanse of Canada from dense forest to open prairie. Her companions for the sea voyage—also funded by the Fellowship of the Maple Leaf—were Dr. Helen O'Brien, who would serve in Lac La Biche, and Dr. Elizabeth Rodger, who was heading to work at Lesser Slave Lake northwest of Edmonton.

Arriving at the end of a three-month drought in Central Alberta, on 21 July 1929 she was introduced to her job by the Minister of Health, the Honourable George Hoadley, at a meeting in Edmonton. Following this meeting she spent a week with the Travelling Clinic, reaching some 50 miles (80 km) north further north to Clyde. Her journey concluded by train 300 miles (480 km) from Edmonton, north to Peace River Town and along the Peace River aboard D.A Thomas accompanied by Kate Brighty, the Superintendent of Public Health Nursing.

== Canada ==
Jackson was based in Battle River Prairie. The nearest medical aid was 120 km away in Peace River, connected to her territory by a dirt road which was impassable in bad weather. In these early days there were eight deliveries of post a year—one delivery per month for the summer months when the river was not frozen. There were no roads, no electricity, no telegraph lines and no services.

She was given a remote log shack in the middle of the 400-square-mile (1,000 km^{2}) area she was to serve. The property was dirty when she arrived, there were no shelves, and the only place for a patient to lie down was her own bed. She was from a family which had a maid, so she was not used to cooking, nor to such harsh circumstances as she found in Canada on her arrival. She had grown up during the First World War, when food was in short supply, with not enough available for girls to have cookery lessons with at school. Cooking at her new home was not easy and happened on a wood-burning stove that needed almost continual stoking to prevent the flames from going out; for quite a time, she relied heavily on her Primus stove. She bought a rifle in 1929 so she could hunt prairie chickens and even moose to supplement her diet. Despite the hardships, she wrote to her parents a few weeks after her arrival "I wouldn’t come back to England for a 1000 dollars just now! I know I’m doing the right job."

The newly arrived doctor began her practice immediately. She traveled by horseback and occasionally by dogsled or cutter. Pneumonia was common in the area, but much of her work was from accidents including gunshot wounds, falls and axe wounds. There were also many childbirths, though the births that Mary attended were often "the kind that would turn you grey" - most of the men in the area expecting their wives to deliver their baby without the assistance of a doctor. A typical week's caseload might include several fractured limbs or a broken back; a birth; cases of dysentery, pneumonia, smallpox, scarlet fever or tuberculosis; as well as the other illnesses expected in a family practice; and perhaps some tooth extractions, as there were no dentists in the area. Many of the cases she saw really needed the attention of a specialist, but as she later said, "Some of the stuff I did I was out of my depth really, but I was the only one there."

=== Marriage ===
One of her early patients was Frank Jackson, a trapper who had contracted blood poisoning in his hand. He had treated himself for a time but when the infection started to spread he travelled 110 km to seek out the new doctor. She opened up the infection, bandaged the wound and left him to sleep. They soon found they had much in common, including finding that they shared love of classical music as they listened to Puccini playing on the Gramophone in temperatures of −40°. Frank, a widower, started to find excuses to travel and see her.

They started courting and were married 10 March 1931 in the Royal Canadian Mounted Police barracks at Battle River. She moved to her husband's homestead at Keg River, 100 km further north than her original assignment in Battle River. With her marriage and the move, she lost her wages, as the government decided that there wasn't a need for a doctor in Keg River, and in those days, husbands were supposed to provide for their wives. But even without the government salary, she continued practicing medicine.

=== Practice in Keg River ===
The Indians and Métis in the small community were remarkably fit, but were being decimated by Tuberculosis (TB). She managed to almost eradicate the spread of TB in the area with preventative techniques and education. This was before there were any drugs to treat TB, so one of the solutions involved stopping people with TB from spitting on the floor. Prior to her arrival the people had had little idea about germs and how they could spread disease. Other prevalent diseases were rickets, which she treated very successfully with doses of cod liver oil, and goiter due to iodine deficiency.

Jackson completed her own laboratory work and X-rays, with equipment set up in various parts of the house. There was no way to get results back in time if she sent the samples out. She had several timers set up around the house, one for bread baking, one for the X-ray, and one for the laboratory tests. She eventually built a small outpost hospital.

The first time she used an antibiotic was after a colleague in Edmonton sent her a small vial containing crystals of penicillin for a Christmas gift. She wondered if this new drug was as good as everyone said it was, and whether it was safe. She decided she would give some of it to the next person who was so sick that she was sure that person would die, having no more she could do for that person. This proved to be a little native girl with pneumonia, whom Jackson believed would not live through the night. She mixed the penicillin and gave a small amount to the girl her every three hours until she was better. The child markedly improved with every hour after beginning the injections of penicillin, and went home completely well. Jackson, many years later, expressed her view with certainty that the child would have died that night without penicillin.

Believing that disease prevention by a mentally and physically healthy community was the best medicine, she and her husband were instrumental in establishing the school, the hospital, the community centre, and a library, all while raising their family. She had two children of her own, and Frank had three from his previous marriage.

=== Arrival of the road ===
In 1935 work started to create the road that is now the Mackenzie Highway. It was during the Great Depression and the government had created a work program to provide employment for the unemployed and helped to build new infrastructure. Conditions for the laboring men were grim, and their canned food supplies often frozen solid. She treated many cases of frostbite, more than she had seen in the previous six years.

The creation of the road altered life in the north significantly. Transporting patients to hospital was now possible and it became easier to get medical supplies. However, it wasn't until after World War II that the road became passable in summer, after the frost had melted and the ground was no longer swampy. The road created work for Mary, particularly in the early days when the road was dirt. In summer, drivers would follow the dust cloud of the vehicle in front (which could last a couple of miles) as a way to find the road, but sometimes they would end up crashing into the vehicle in front.

=== Later life ===
She retired from active practice in 1975. She and Frank then enjoyed various holidays, away from the harsh North of Canada. Frank Jackson died on 1 September 1979. Following her husband's death, she started doing more lectures and talks. She also visited her family in Britain several times, often taking some of her grandchildren with her. She told many stories, both from her own life and the extensive reading she undertook. She had a very down to earth attitude and spoke plainly. She said that she had no fear of being dead, commenting: "It's not being dead that one is afraid of, but a process of dying after a stroke or a heart attack. When you've almost got one foot in heaven, it's a bit annoying to be brought back so you can do the whole thing again slowly. Doctors say they don't want to play God, but if a person has died suddenly and then is brought back to life, that is playing God."

== Recognition ==
- 1953, Master Farm Family of Alberta award for proficiency (awarded to only five farming families in total).
- 1963, Dr Mary Jackson School named after her and serving grades K-12 in Keg River, Alberta.
- 1967, Centennial Medal of Canada "in recognition of valuable service to the nation".
- 1975, Alberta Achievement Award, together with her husband, Frank Jackson "in recognition of outstanding service in the community".
- 1975, Woman of the Year by the Voice of Native Women.
- 1976, Honorary Doctor of Laws degree from the University of Alberta.
- 1983, Alberta Order of Excellence.
- 1989, Officer in the Order of Canada.

In 1955 she received a type-written letter dated 28 July 1955 from Clarence House, on behalf of the British Queen Mother:

                     CLARENCE HOUSE
                        S. W. 1.
                                                  28th. July 1955.
Dear Dr. Percy-Jackson,
               I am commanded by Queen Elizabeth the Queen Mother to
write and say that Her Majesty commands me to send you a brief word
of appreciation for the truly great work that you are doing in and
around Keg River.
              I am to explain that Queen Elizabeth reads the magazine
of the Fellowship of the Maple Leaf and Her Majestywas deeply impressed
to read of your great work, to alleviate suffering and to bring comfort
to those who live in such isolated and often almost intolerably
difficult surroundings.
              Queen Elizabeth knows full well that such work cannot be
carried out without real courage and self-sacrifice, and I am to finish
this short letter by saying how much Her Majesty hopes that you may go
from strength to strength in your great undertaking,
                    Yours sincerely,
                                         Katherine Seymour.

== Publications ==
- On the Last Frontier: Pioneering in the Peace River Block (1933)
- The Homemade Brass Plate: The Story of a Pioneer Doctor in Northern Alberta (with Cornelia Lehn) (1988)
- Suitable for the Wilds: Letters from Northern Alberta, 1929-1931 (edited by Janice Dickin McGinnis)

== Bibliography ==
- Philip, Tom (26 December 1983). "Pioneering Peace medicine". Alberta Report. pp. 30–33.
- On the Last Frontier: Pioneering in the Peace River block, Letters of Mary Percy Jackson. London, United Kingdom and Toronto, Ontario, Canada: Sheldon Press and General Board of Religious Education. 1933. pp. 1–118 pages.
- Lehn, Cornelia (1988). The Homemade Brass Plate: The story of a pioneer doctor in northern Alberta as told to Cornelia Lehn. Helena Braun/Fraser Valley Custom Printers. pp. 1–215 pages. ISBN 0-9691961-2-1.
- A Candle in the Grub Box. Biography of Frank Jackson up until 1931.
- Douglas, Shelia M. (1979). Jam in the Bed Roll: The continuing story of Frank Jackson as told to Shelia Douglas. Nanaino, British Columbia: Shires Brook. pp. 1–151 pages.
- S, F (1937). "Life in the Rockies: All Night Journey over Snow to a Patient". Dudley Herald. Dudley, Worcestershire, England. "Dudley Lady Doctor and Coroner Describes Her Experiences"
