= Figure Eight Lake =

Lake in Alberta, Canada

- Location within Alberta
- Location: County of Northern Lights, Alberta
- Coordinates: 56.301°N 117.906°W
- Basin countries: Canada
- Max. length: 1 km (0.62 mi)
- Max. width: 0.7 km (0.43 mi)
- Surface area: 0.368 km^{2} (0.142 sq mi)
- Average depth: 3.0 m (9.8 ft)
- Max. depth: 6 m (20 ft)
- Surface elevation: 683 m (2,241 ft)
- References: Figure Eight Lake

Figure Eight Lake is a lake in Alberta, Canada.
