= Hotchkiss, Alberta =

Unincorporated community in Alberta, Canada

Hotchkiss
- Unincorporated place
- Interactive map of Hotchkiss
- Coordinates: 57°3′42″N 117°34′21″W
- Country: Canada
- Province: Alberta
- County: Northern Lights

Hotchkiss is an unincorporated community in northern Alberta under the jurisdiction of the County of Northern Lights.

It is located on the Mackenzie Highway (Highway 35), approximately 16 kilometres (9.9 mi) north of the Town of Manning.

There is a historical Ukrainian Catholic parish and cemetery located here.
