= Rose Prairie =

- Unincorporated Municipality
- Interactive map of Rose Prairie
- Location within British Columbia Location within Canada

Population
  - Total: 50
- Postal code: V0C 2H0
- Area code: 250

Rose Prairie is a settlement in British Columbia. It is located 30 km (19 mi) north of Fort St. John, British Columbia.

== History ==
Rose Prairie was first settled c. 1940. In 1950 the Chinchaga Fire started in Rose Prairie. It was and still is the single largest recorded wildfire in North American history.

On January 13, 2023 at night, the church in Rose Prairie known as Upper Pine Gospel Chapel or UPGC, burned down.
