= Cherry Point, Alberta =

Locality in Alberta, Canada

Coordinates: 56°11′16″N 119°57′15″W

Location of Cherry Point Alberta

Cherry Point is an unincorporated locality in the Canadian province of Alberta, located in Clear Hills County, 12 kilometres (7.5 mi) south of Highway 64, 134 kilometres (83 mi) northwest of Grande Prairie.
