= Worsley, Alberta =

Worsley
- Hamlet
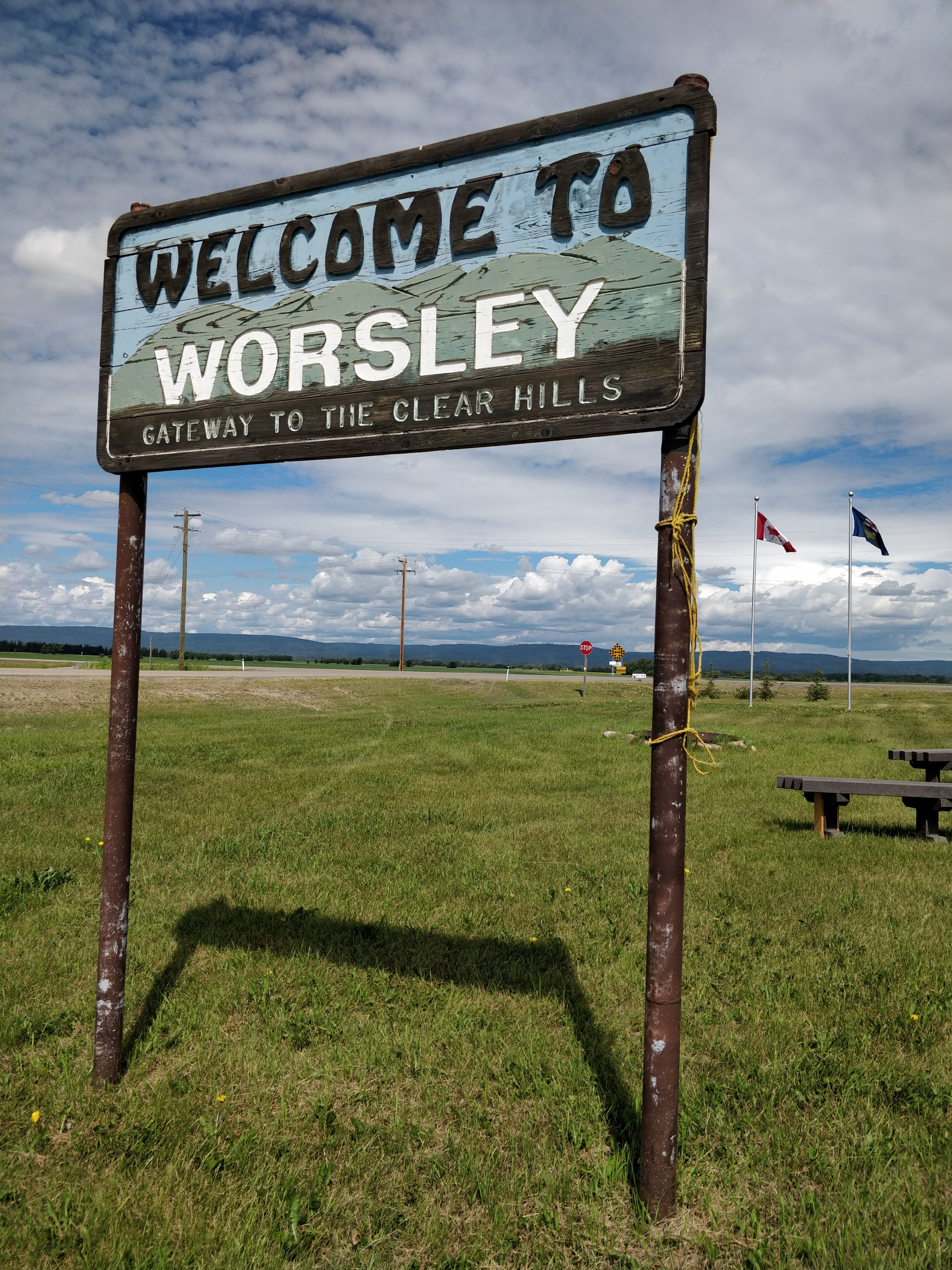
- Welcome sign
- Motto: Gateway to the Clear Hills
- Location within Alberta
- Coordinates: 56°30′24″N 119°08′02″W
- Country: Canada
- Province: Alberta
- Federal riding: Grande Prairie-Mackenzie
- Provincial riding: Central Peace-Notley

Population (2008)
  - Total: 28
- Time zone: Alberta Time
- Postal code: T0H 3W0

Worsley is a hamlet in northern Alberta, Canada within Clear Hills County. It is located in the Peace Country, at the northern end of Highway 726, approximately 18 km (11 mi) north of Highway 64, 59 km (37 mi) northwest of Hines Creek and 50 km (31 mi) east of the British Columbia border. It lies at an elevation of 650 m (2,130 ft) amidst prairie farmland and ranchland.

It was named after Erick Worsley, a British Cavalry Officer and fur trader who arrived in the area in the 1930. Clear Hills County's municipal office is located in Worsley.

== History ==
The first post office was established in Worsley in 1931.

== Demographics ==
The population of Worsley according to the 2008 municipal census conducted by Clear Hills County is 28.

== Economy ==
Worsley is an agricultural service centre for the surrounding farming communities, which raise mostly crops of barley, wheat, canola and fescue.

== Attractions ==
The Whispering Pines Ski Hill, a 17-run ski resort is located in the Clear Hills, approximately 25 km (16 mi) northwest of Worsley.

== See also ==
- List of communities in Alberta
- List of hamlets in Alberta
