= Bear Canyon, Alberta =

Coordinates: 56°13′02″N 119°49′07″W

Location of Bear Canyon Alberta

Bear Canyon is a rural community in northern Alberta, Canada. Located in Clear Hills County, it is 200 km (120 mi) west of Peace River, approximately 200 km (120 mi) northwest of Grande Prairie.

The community had its own school, Bear Canyon School, until the early 2000s. It also took students from nearby farms in British Columbia.
