= County of Northern Lights =

Municipal district in Alberta, Canada

- Municipal district

- Location within Alberta
- Country: Canada
- Province: Alberta
- Region: Northern Alberta
- Census division: 17
- Established: 1995
- Incorporated: 1995

Government
  - Reeve: Terry Ungarian
  - Governing body: County of Northern Lights Council
  - Administrative office: Manning

Area (2021)
  - Land: 20,627.02 km^{2} (7,964.14 sq mi)

Population (2021)
  - Total: 4,152
  - Density: 0.2/km^{2} (0.52/sq mi)
- Time zone: UTC−06:00 (Alberta Time)
- Website: countyofnorthernlights.com

The County of Northern Lights is a municipal district in northwest Alberta, Canada. Located in Census Division 17, its municipal office is located in the Town of Manning.

The municipality recently changed its name from the Municipal District (M.D.) of Northern Lights No. 22 to the County of Northern Lights. The Province of Alberta officially approved the name change on February 3, 2010.

On April 1, 1995, the M.D. of Northern Lights No. 22 was formed through the incorporation of the former Improvement District No. 22 as a municipal district.

== Geography ==
=== Communities and localities ===
The following urban municipalities are surrounded by the County of Northern Lights.

Towns:

- Manning

Hamlets:

- Deadwood
- Dixonville
- North Star
- Notikewin

Métis settlements:

- Paddle Prairie Metis Settlement

Localities:

- Chinook Valley
- Clear Hills
- Fairacres
- Hawk Hills
- Hotchkiss
- Keg River
- Kemp River
- Leddy
- Scully Creek
- Smithmill
- Sweet Water
- Warrensville
- Warrensville Centre
- Weberville

Other places:

- Carcajou
- Twin Lakes

== Demographics ==
As a census subdivision in the 2021 Census of Population conducted by Statistics Canada, the County of Northern Lights had a population of 4,152 living in 1,559 of its 1,864 total private dwellings, a change of −1.1% from its 2016 population of 4,200. With a land area of 20,627.02 km^{2} (7,964.14 sq mi), it had a population density of 0.2/km^{2} (0.5/sq mi) in 2021.

As a census subdivision in the 2016 Census of Population conducted by Statistics Canada, Northern Lights had a population of 4,200 living in 1,538 of its 1,846 total private dwellings, a 2% change from its 2011 population of 4,117. This includes the population of the Paddle Prairie Metis Settlement (544), located within the census subdivision that is a municipality independent of the County of Northern Lights. With a land area of 20,755.37 km^{2} (8,013.69 sq mi), the census subdivision had a population density of 0.2/km^{2} (0.5/sq mi) in 2016. Excluding the Paddle Prairie Metis Settlement, the County of Northern Lights had a population of 3,656 in 2016, a change of 2.8% from its 2011 population of 3,555.

== Attractions ==
- Figure Eight Lake Provincial Recreation Area
- Leddy Lake Provincial Recreation Area
- Sulphur Lake Provincial Recreation Area
- Notikewin Provincial Park

== See also ==
- List of communities in Alberta
- List of municipal districts in Alberta
