= Hines Creek =

- Village
- Village of Hines Creek
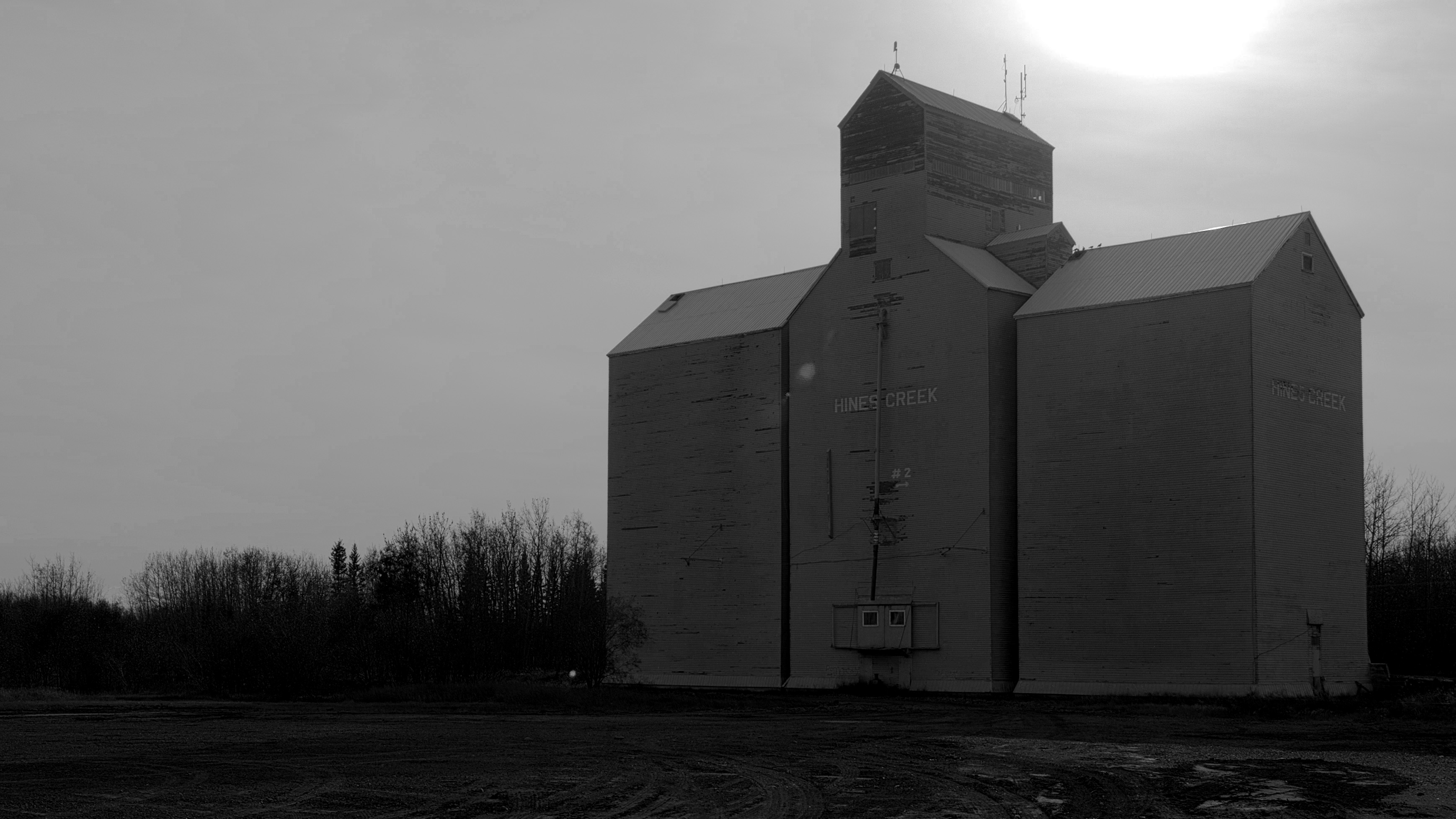
- Motto: End of Steel
- Location in Clear Hills County

- Location within Alberta
- Coordinates: 56°14′46″N 118°35′38″W
- Country: Canada
- Province: Alberta
- Region: Northern Alberta
- Planning region: Upper Peace
- Municipal district: Clear Hills County
- Incorporated
  - Village: December 31, 1951

Government
  - Mayor: Hazel Reintjes
  - Governing body: Hines Creek Village Council

Area (2021)
  - Land: 4.88 km^{2} (1.88 sq mi)
- Elevation: 655 m (2,149 ft)

Population (2021)
  - Total: 335
  - Density: 68.7/km^{2} (178/sq mi)
- Time zone: UTC−06:00 (Alberta Time)
- Highways: 64
- Waterways: George Lake
- Website: www.hinescreek.com

Hines Creek is a village in northern Alberta, Canada. It is located 67 km west of Grimshaw and 28 km north of Fairview, along Highway 64.

== History ==
The earliest settlers in this area were ranchers who arrived in the late 1910s.

== Demographics ==
Federal census population history
Year	Pop.	±%
1956	360	—
1961	398	+10.6%
1966	418	+5.0%
1971	438	+4.8%
1976	503	+14.8%
1981	575	+14.3%
1986	515	−10.4%
1991	423	−17.9%
1996	437	+3.3%
2001	437	+0.0%
2006	430	−1.6%
2011	380	−11.6%
2016	346	−8.9%
Source: Statistics Canada

In the 2021 Census of Population conducted by Statistics Canada, the Village of Hines Creek had a population of 335 living in 149 of its 184 total private dwellings, a change of −3.2% from its 2016 population of 346. With a land area of 4.88 km^{2} (1.88 sq mi), it had a population density of 68.6/km^{2} (177.8/sq mi) in 2021.

In the 2016 Census of Population conducted by Statistics Canada, the Village of Hines Creek recorded a population of 346 living in 146 of its 151 total private dwellings, a change of −8.9% from its 2011 population of 380. With a land area of 5.33 km^{2} (2.06 sq mi), it had a population density of 64.9/km^{2} (168.1/sq mi) in 2016.

== Education ==
Hines Creek Composite School is the only school in Hines Creek and features Grade K-12. It is administered by the Peace River School Division.

Post secondary education is available in the neighbouring town of Fairview at Grande Prairie Regional Fairview Campus.

== See also ==
- List of communities in Alberta
- List of villages in Alberta
