= Clear Hills County =

Municipal district in Alberta, Canada

- Municipal district
- Seal

- Location within Alberta
- Country: Canada
- Province: Alberta
- Region: Northern Alberta
- Census division: 17
- Established: 1995
- Incorporated: 2006

Government
  - Reeve: Amber Bean
  - Governing body: Clear Hills County Council
  - Administrative office: Worsley

Area (2021)
  - Land: 15,025.54 km^{2} (5,801.39 sq mi)

Population (2021)
  - Total: 3,006
  - Density: 0.2/km^{2} (0.52/sq mi)
- Time zone: UTC−06:00 (Alberta Time)
- Website: clearhillscounty.ab.ca

Clear Hills County is a municipal district in north western Alberta, Canada. It is located in Census Division 17.

In 1950, the massive Chinchaga fire burned through much of the region.

On January 1, 2006, the name was changed from Municipal District of Clear Hills No. 21 to Clear Hills County.

== Geography ==
=== Communities and localities ===
The following urban municipalities are surrounded by Clear Hills County.

Cities

- none

Towns

- none

Villages

- Hines Creek

Summer villages

- none

The following hamlets are located within Clear Hills County.

Hamlets

- Cleardale
- Worsley

The following localities are located within Clear Hills County.

Localities

- Bear Canyon
- Cherry Point
- Clear Prairie
- Deer Hill
- Eureka River
- Marina
- Peace Grove
- Royce

Other places

- Doig

== Demographics ==
In the 2021 Census of Population conducted by Statistics Canada, Clear Hills County had a population of 3,006 living in 930 of its 1,107 total private dwellings, a change of −0.4% from its 2016 population of 3,018. With a land area of 15,025.54 km^{2} (5,801.39 sq mi), it had a population density of 0.2/km^{2} (0.5/sq mi) in 2021.

In the 2016 Census of Population conducted by Statistics Canada, Clear Hills County had a population of 3,023 living in 938 of its 1,062 total private dwellings, a 7.9% change from its 2011 population of 2,801. With a land area of 15,125.49 km^{2} (5,839.98 sq mi), it had a population density of 0.2/km^{2} (0.5/sq mi) in 2016.

Clear Hills County's 2012 municipal census counted a population of 2,829, a 4.7% decrease over its 2008 municipal census population of 2,970.

== See also ==
- List of communities in Alberta
- List of municipal districts in Alberta
