= Keg River, Alberta =

Keg River
- Unincorporated community
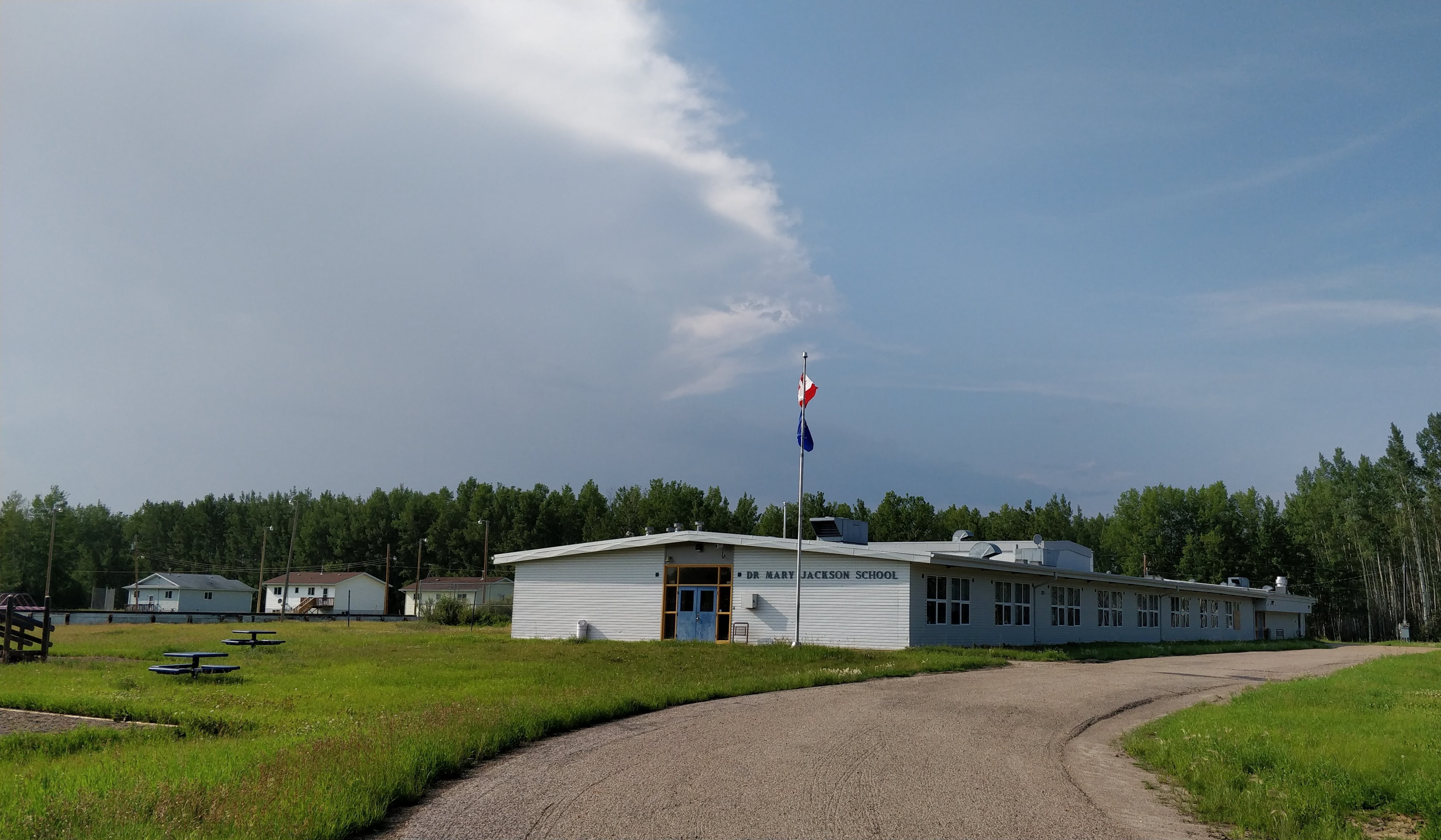
- Dr. Mary Jackson School

- Location of Keg River in CAN AB Northern Lights Location of Keg River in Alberta Keg River (Canada) Keg River (North America)
- Coordinates: 57.7882°N 117.8584°W
- Country: Canada
- Province: Alberta
- Census division: No. 17
- Municipal district: County of Northern Lights

Government
  - Type: Unincorporated
  - Governing body: County of Northern Lights Council
- Elevation: 420 m (1,380 ft)
- Time zone: UTC-7 (MST)

Keg River is an unincorporated community in northern Alberta, Canada. It is west of Highway 35 (also known as the Mackenzie Highway) approximately midway between Manning to the south and High Level to the north. It has an elevation of 420 metres (1,380 ft).

The community is located in census division No. 17 and in the federal riding of Peace River. It is administered by the County of Northern Lights.

== Climate ==
Keg River has a subarctic climate (Köppen climate classification: Dfc). The coldest temperature ever recorded was −55.0 °C (−67.0 °F) on 1 February 1947

Climate data for Keg River
Month	Jan	Feb	Mar	Apr	May	Jun	Jul	Aug	Sep	Oct	Nov	Dec	Year
Record high °C (°F)	14.5 (58.1)	16.0 (60.8)	17.0 (62.6)	30.0 (86.0)	33.0 (91.4)	34.0 (93.2)	35.0 (95.0)	32.8 (91.0)	32.5 (90.5)	26.5 (79.7)	16.5 (61.7)	13.0 (55.4)	35.0 (95.0)
Mean daily maximum °C (°F)	−12.1 (10.2)	−7.2 (19.0)	0.3 (32.5)	9.9 (49.8)	16.5 (61.7)	21.4 (70.5)	22.8 (73.0)	20.9 (69.6)	15.7 (60.3)	7.2 (45.0)	−5.9 (21.4)	−9.3 (15.3)	6.7 (44.1)
Daily mean °C (°F)	−18.4 (−1.1)	−14.3 (6.3)	−7.3 (18.9)	2.9 (37.2)	9.2 (48.6)	14.1 (57.4)	16.0 (60.8)	14.0 (57.2)	8.8 (47.8)	1.5 (34.7)	−11.2 (11.8)	−15.4 (4.3)	0.0 (32.0)
Mean daily minimum °C (°F)	−24.6 (−12.3)	−21.4 (−6.5)	−14.9 (5.2)	−4.1 (24.6)	2.0 (35.6)	6.8 (44.2)	9.2 (48.6)	7.0 (44.6)	2.0 (35.6)	−4.2 (24.4)	−16.4 (2.5)	−21.5 (−6.7)	−6.7 (19.9)
Record low °C (°F)	−54.4 (−65.9)	−55.0 (−67.0)	−44.4 (−47.9)	−40.0 (−40.0)	−14.0 (6.8)	−5.0 (23.0)	−2.4 (27.7)	−4.5 (23.9)	−17.2 (1.0)	−33.5 (−28.3)	−45.0 (−49.0)	−48.3 (−54.9)	−55.0 (−67.0)
Average precipitation mm (inches)	24.7 (0.97)	19.8 (0.78)	18.4 (0.72)	21.2 (0.83)	36.6 (1.44)	57.1 (2.25)	89.0 (3.50)	63.4 (2.50)	37.5 (1.48)	28.5 (1.12)	30.4 (1.20)	20.6 (0.81)	447.2 (17.61)
Source: Environment Canada

== See also ==
- List of communities in Alberta
