= Division No. 17, Alberta =

Census division in Canada

Coordinates: 55°16′48″N 114°46′48″W

Division No. 17
- Census division in Alberta
- Country: Canada
- Province: Alberta

Area
  - Total: 192,116 km^{2} (74,176 sq mi)

Population (2021)
  - Total: 62,132
  - Density: 0.32341/km^{2} (0.83762/sq mi)

Division No. 17 is a census division in Alberta, Canada. It spans the central and northwest portions of northern Alberta and its largest urban community is the Town of Slave Lake. Division No. 17 is the largest census division in Alberta according to area and also has the lowest population density.

== Census subdivisions ==
The following census subdivisions (municipalities or municipal equivalents) are located within Alberta's Division No. 17.

- Towns
  - High Level
  - High Prairie
  - Manning
  - Rainbow Lake
  - Slave Lake
  - Swan Hills
- Villages
  - Hines Creek
  - Nampa
- Specialized municipalities
  - Mackenzie County
- Municipal districts
  - Big Lakes County
  - Clear Hills County
  - Lesser Slave River No. 124, M.D. of
  - Northern Lights, County of
  - Northern Sunrise County
  - Opportunity No. 17, M.D. of
- Indian reserves
  - Beaver Ranch 163 which is part of the Tallcree First Nation.
  - Boyer 164
  - Bushe River 207 which is part of Dene Tha' First Nation.
  - Child Lake 164A which is part of the Beaver First Nation.
  - Clear Hills 152C which is part of the Horse Lake First Nation.
  - Drift Pile River 150 which is part of Driftpile First Nation also known as Driftpile Cree Nation
  - Fort Vermilion 173B which is part of Tallcree First Nation.
  - Fox Lake 162 which is part of the Little Red River Cree Nation.
  - Hay Lake 209 which is part of the Dene Tha' First Nation.
  - Jean Baptiste Gambler 183 which is part of the Bigstone Cree Nation.
  - John D'Or Prairie 215 which is part of the Little Red River Cree Nation.
  - Kapawe'no First Nation
    - Kapawe'no 150B, historically known as Freeman 150B, which is part of the Kapawe'no First Nation.
    - Kapawe'no 230 which is part of the Kapawe'no First Nation.
    - Kapawe'no 150C also known as Halcro 150C, which is part of the which is part of the Kapawe'no First Nation.
    - Pakashan 150D
  - Loon Lake 235
  - Sawridge 150G
  - Sawridge 150H
  - Sucker Creek 150A
  - Swan River 150E
  - Tall Cree 173
  - Tall Cree 173A
  - Upper Hay River 212
  - Utikoomak Lake 155
  - Utikoomak Lake 155A
  - Wabasca 166
  - Wabasca 166A
  - Wabasca 166B
  - Wabasca 166C
  - Wabasca 166D
  - Woodland Cree 226
  - Woodland Cree 228
- Indian settlements
  - Carcajou
  - Desmarais
  - John D'Or Prairie
  - Little Buffalo
  - Paddle Prairie

== Demographics ==
Historical population
Year	Pop.	±%
1991	48,962	—
1996	54,709	+11.7%
2001	57,508	+5.1%
2006	59,282	+3.1%
2011	61,504	+3.7%
2016	61,590	+0.1%
2021	62,132	+0.9%

In the 2021 Census of Population conducted by Statistics Canada, Division No. 17 had a population of 62,132 living in 20,539 of its 24,540 total private dwellings, a change of 0.9% from its 2016 population of 61,590. With a land area of 190,433.83 km^{2} (73,526.91 sq mi), it had a population density of 0.3/km^{2} (0.8/sq mi) in 2021.

== See also ==
- List of census divisions of Alberta
- List of communities in Alberta
