= Manning, Alberta =

Manning
- Town
- Town of Manning
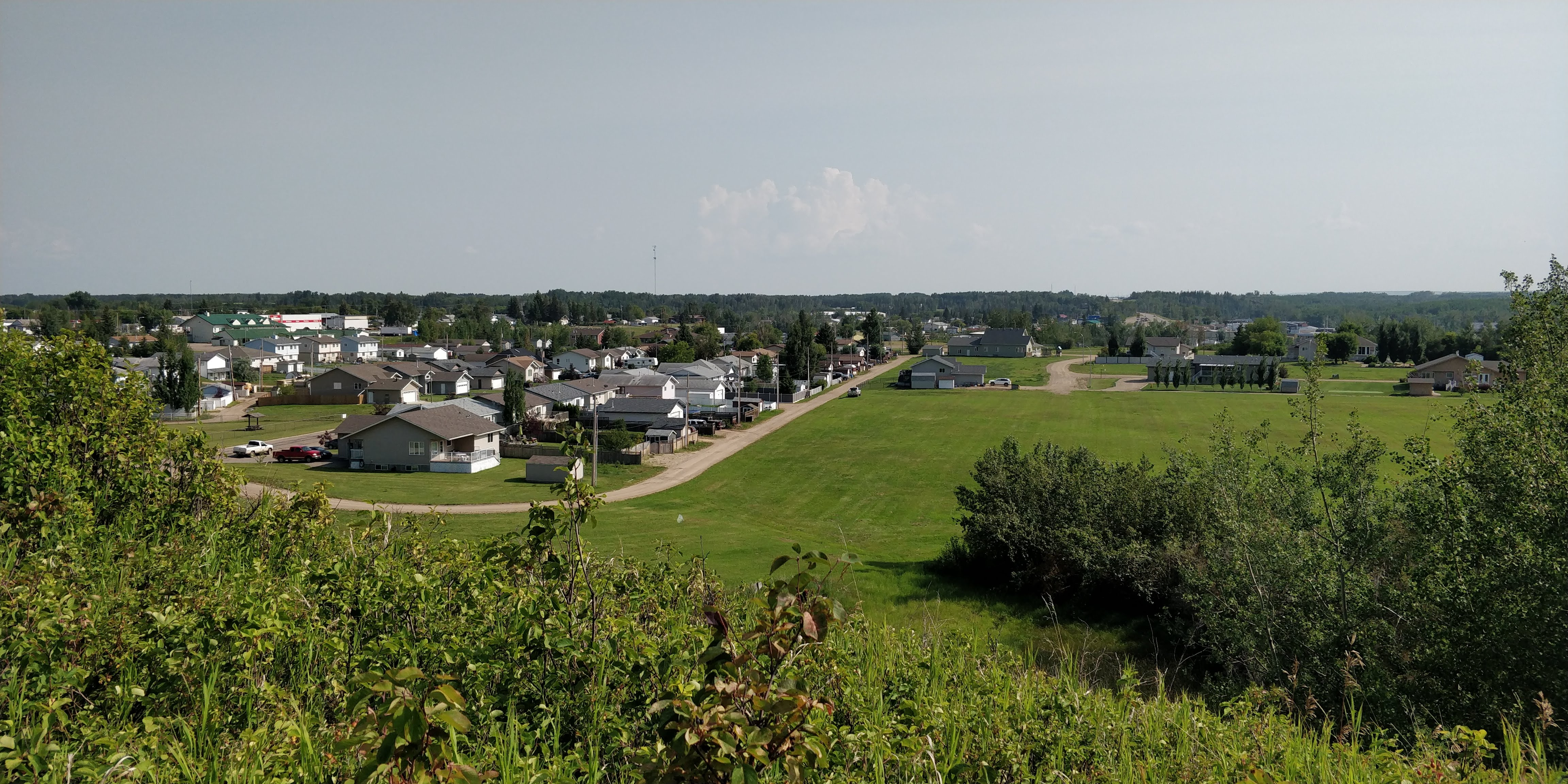
- Nickname: Land of the Mighty Moose
- Location in County of Northern Lights

- Location within Alberta Location within Canada Location within North America
- Coordinates: 56°54′51″N 117°37′38″W
- Country: Canada
- Province: Alberta
- Region: Northern Alberta
- Planning region: Lower Peace
- Incorporated
  - Village: December 31, 1951
  - Town: January 1, 1957
- Named after: Ernest Manning

Government
  - Mayor: Robert McLeod
  - Governing body: Manning Town Council

Area (2021)
  - Land: 3.71 km^{2} (1.43 sq mi)
- Elevation: 465 m (1,526 ft)

Population (2021)
  - Total: 1,126
  - Density: 303.1/km^{2} (785/sq mi)
- Time zone: UTC−06:00 (Alberta Time)
- Postal code: T0H 2M0
- Area code: 780
- Highways: Highway 35; Highway 691
- Waterway: Notikewin River
- Website: manning.ca

Manning is a town in northern Alberta, Canada. It is known as the "Land of the Mighty Moose". It is on Highway 35 on the Notikewin River, approximately 73 km (45 mi) north of Peace River.

Manning is a service centre for the local agriculture, forestry and gas industries. It also serves the nearby rural area within the County of Northern Lights including Deadwood, Hotchkiss, North Star and Notikewin.

== History ==
The community of Manning sprung up as a result of growing agricultural development following the First World War as the Dominion government sought to provide land to returning soldiers to participate in the workforce. The Soldier Settlement Board provided incentives to veterans to begin farming unsettled tracts on the Battle River Prairie 75 km (47 mi) north of the Town of Peace River and west of the Peace River. By 1921 the district had a population of 500 and the community of Battle River Prairie (later Notikewin) grew as a regional hub. In the late-1920s the communities of Hotchkiss and North Star sprang up in the region.

The northern communities suffered from limited medical resources, which were facilitated by mobile clinics staffed with registered nurses. In 1928 nurse Mary Little was assigned to the region, and in 1929 she was replaced by Dr. Mary Percy, who was recruited from England. Dr. Percy served the area until 1937, when the new hospital was completed.

The population continued to grow in the 1930s, with farmers moving from the drought-stricken regions of southern Alberta. Pressure began to grow for the construction of a hospital in the region, and the Women's Missionary Society of the United Church of Canada began collecting funds for the construction, with the Government of Alberta agreeing to match funds collected for the new hospital.

In fall 1936 construction began on the eight-bed Battle River Hospital, which was completed on September 4, 1937, and later become the hub of the new Aurora settlement. The land was donated by John Robertson, and resident doctor Arthur Doige was secured to operate the hospital. Construction was supervised by W.D.C. Buchanon, and the structure included a operating room, waiting room, kitchen, and accommodation on the second floor for three nurses.

The official settlement was founded by American Patrick "Pat" Larry Craig, who purchased land on the south bank of the Notikewin River and built the Aurora hotel, secured a liquor licence and constructed other buildings after the Second World War. The settlement originally intended to be founded under the name Aurora, but was rejected by the postal authorities because of possibility of confusion with Aurora, Ontario. In 1947 the Mackenzie Highway was pushed through the region, and the community became a government construction and maintenance centre, and quickly eclipsed North Star and Notikewin in population. At a public meeting in 1947, the community was renamed in honour of Ernest Manning, who had become premier of Alberta four years earlier in 1943, and served in the role until 1968.

Manning was incorporated as a village on December 31, 1951, and later a town on January 1, 1957. During the 1950s the Manning Municipal Hospital was constructed at a cost of $127,000, and later in September 1962, the Great Slave Lake Railway was completed by Canadian National Railways linking the town to the rail network.

== Climate ==
Manning has a subarctic climate, very close to being a humid continental climate, with both May and September averaging only fractionally under 10 °C (50 °F). There are vast differences between the warm summers and very cold winters, although areas much further south more eastward in Canada have equally cold winters and cooler summers. The climate data is from minor settlement Notikewin very close to the town.

Climate data for Notikewin/Manning
| Month | Jan | Feb | Mar | Apr | May | Jun | Jul | Aug | Sep | Oct | Nov | Dec | Year |
|---|---|---|---|---|---|---|---|---|---|---|---|---|---|
| Record high °C (°F) | 14 (57) | 12.5 (54.5) | 15 (59) | 26.5 (79.7) | 31.5 (88.7) | 32.7 (90.9) | 33.9 (93.0) | 34.2 (93.6) | 31.5 (88.7) | 26.1 (79.0) | 15 (59) | 12.2 (54.0) | 34.2 (93.6) |
| Mean daily maximum °C (°F) | −10.8 (12.6) | −6.7 (19.9) | −1 (30) | 10.1 (50.2) | 16.7 (62.1) | 21 (70) | 22.8 (73.0) | 21.6 (70.9) | 16.6 (61.9) | 8.3 (46.9) | −3.7 (25.3) | −7 (19) | 7.3 (45.2) |
| Daily mean °C (°F) | −16.6 (2.1) | −13.1 (8.4) | −7.4 (18.7) | 3.4 (38.1) | 9.6 (49.3) | 14.4 (57.9) | 16.2 (61.2) | 14.8 (58.6) | 9.9 (49.8) | 2.4 (36.3) | −8.8 (16.2) | −12.7 (9.1) | 1.0 (33.8) |
| Mean daily minimum °C (°F) | −22.3 (−8.1) | −19.5 (−3.1) | −13.9 (7.0) | −3.2 (26.2) | 2.5 (36.5) | 7.7 (45.9) | 9.6 (49.3) | 7.9 (46.2) | 3 (37) | −3.5 (25.7) | −13.8 (7.2) | −18.4 (−1.1) | −5.3 (22.4) |
| Record low °C (°F) | −51 (−60) | −49 (−56) | −40.5 (−40.9) | −25.9 (−14.6) | −13.5 (7.7) | −1.5 (29.3) | 0.3 (32.5) | −6 (21) | −9.5 (14.9) | −27 (−17) | −39.5 (−39.1) | −45 (−49) | −51 (−60) |
| Average precipitation mm (inches) | 37.5 (1.48) | 25.4 (1.00) | 28.3 (1.11) | 18.1 (0.71) | 39.9 (1.57) | 64.2 (2.53) | 85 (3.3) | 50.4 (1.98) | 36.8 (1.45) | 24.4 (0.96) | 44.7 (1.76) | 27.9 (1.10) | 482.6 (18.95) |

== Demographics ==
Federal census population history
| Year | Pop. | ±% |
|---|---|---|
| 1956 | 726 | — |
| 1961 | 896 | +23.4% |
| 1966 | 1,179 | +31.6% |
| 1971 | 1,071 | −9.2% |
| 1976 | 1,050 | −2.0% |
| 1981 | 1,173 | +11.7% |
| 1986 | 1,144 | −2.5% |
| 1991 | 1,139 | −0.4% |
| 1996 | 1,295 | +13.7% |
| 2001 | 1,293 | −0.2% |
| 2006 | 1,493 | +15.5% |
| 2011 | 1,164 | −22.0% |
| 2016 | 1,183 | +1.6% |
Source: Statistics Canada

In the 2021 Census of Population conducted by Statistics Canada, the Town of Manning had a population of 1,126 living in 471 of its 540 total private dwellings, a change of −4.8% from its 2016 population of 1,183. With a land area of 3.71 km^{2} (1.43 sq mi), it had a population density of 303.5/km^{2} (786.1/sq mi) in 2021.

In the 2016 Census of Population conducted by Statistics Canada, the Town of Manning recorded a population of 1,183 living in 484 of its 544 total private dwellings, a 1.6% change from its 2011 population of 1,164. With a land area of 4.05 km^{2} (1.56 sq mi), it had a population density of 292.1/km^{2} (756.5/sq mi) in 2016.

== Attractions ==
The Battle River Pioneer Museum is home to many pieces of antique farming equipment, vehicles and other extraordinary items, like the albino moose and Cleave Whitaker's childhood crib.

The Manning Farmers’ Market has been a fixture in Manning for over 30 years.

Recreation venues include the Manning R.C.M.P. Centennial Pool, a paved walking trail, a curling rink, a skating/hockey arena, two outdoor ice rinks, a ski hill, a concrete skatepark, an outdoor splash park, and the Condy Meadows Golf Course and Recreation Area.

The Battle River Hospital located on Centre Street and 1st Avenue North is a 1 1/2-storey hospital built between 1936 and 1937 to serve as the hospital for the region. The Battle River Hospital was designated an Alberta Provincial Historic Resource under the Historical Resources Act on March 11, 2009.

== Infrastructure ==
Manning has a hospital. It also has a newly constructed RCMP detachment, fire station and skatepark, along with an indoor/outdoor pool. The town is serviced by Manning Airport, located 3.3 km northwest of the community.

== Government ==
The Town of Manning is a municipal corporation with a council–manager government structure consisting of a seven-member Council elected every four years. The council itself consists of an at-large mayor and six councillors. The legal authority to govern as a "creature of the province" is derived from various regulations and legislation of the Alberta Legislature, of which the Municipal Government Act provides many of the powers and responsibilities for the town. The current Mayor Robert McLeod was elected over opponent Sunni-Jean Walker in the 2021 Alberta municipal elections.

Provincially, the Town of Manning is represented by the Member of the Legislative Assembly for Peace River, which is held by Dan Williams since the 2019 Alberta general election. Federally, the Town of Manning is represented by the Member of Parliament for Grande Prairie-Mackenzie, which is held by Chris Warkentin.

== Education ==
Manning contains one public school which is part of the Peace River School Division No. 10. The school is called Manning Aurora Composite school and opened up for the 2025 -2026 school year. It replaces Manning Elementary which provided kindergarten to grade six, and Paul Rowe High School which provided grades seven through twelve. Manning has one separate school under the Holy Family Catholic Regional Division No. 37, Rosary Separate School which provides kindergarten to grade nine.

== Media ==
Manning is served weekly by The Banner Post

== Notable people ==
- Dakota House - Canadian actor, politician, writer and activist born in Manning, Alberta

== See also ==
- List of communities in Alberta
- List of towns in Alberta
