= Fort McMurray—Athabasca =

Former federal electoral district in Alberta, Canada

Alberta electoral district
- Fort McMurray—Athabasca in relation to the other Alberta federal electoral districts (2003 map)

Defunct federal electoral district
- Legislature: House of Commons
- District created: 1966
- District abolished: 2013
- First contested: 1968
- Last contested: 2011
- District webpage: profile, map

Demographics
- Population (2011): 115,372
- Electors (2011): 71,621
- Area (km²): 176,648.51
- Census division(s): Division No. 12, Division No. 13, Division No. 16, Division No. 17
- Census subdivision(s): Allison Bay 219, Athabasca, Athabasca County, Beaver Lake 131, Big Lakes, Bondiss, Boyle, Charles Lake 225, Chipewyan 201A, Desmarais, Dog Head 218, Drift Pile River 150, Fort McKay, Fort McKay 174, Gregoire Lake 176, Gregoire Lake 176A, Heart Lake 167, High Prairie, Improvement District No. 24 Wood Buffalo, Island Lake, Island Lake South, Janvier 194, Jean Baptiste Gambler 183, Kapawe'no First Nation (Freeman 150B), Kapawe'no First Nation (Grouard 230), Kapawe'no First Nation (Halcro 150C), Kapawe'no First Nation (Pakashan 150D), Lac La Biche County, Lesser Slave River No. 124, Loon Lake 235, Mewatha Beach, Namur Lake 174B, Namur River 174A, Northern Sunrise County, Opportunity No. 17, Sawridge 150G, Sawridge 150H, Slave Lake, South Baptiste, Sucker Creek 150A, Sunset Beach, Swan River 150E, Thabacha Náre 196A, Thebathi 196, Utikoomak Lake 155, Utikoomak Lake 155A, Wabasca 166, Wabasca 166A, Wabasca 166B, Wabasca 166C, Wabasca 166D, West Baptiste, Whispering Hills, Wood Buffalo, Woodlands County

Fort McMurray—Athabasca (formerly Athabasca) was a federal electoral district in Alberta, Canada, that was represented in the House of Commons of Canada from 1968 to 2015. It was a predominantly rural riding in northeastern Alberta, representing the Regional Municipality of Wood Buffalo, the Municipal District of Opportunity No. 17, the Municipal District of Lesser Slave River No. 124, Big Lakes County, Lac La Biche County, Athabasca County and the southeastern part of Northern Sunrise County.

== Demographics ==
According to the 2011 Canadian census

Ethnic groups: 65.8% White, 22.1% Aboriginal, 3.8% South Asian, 2.5% Filipino, 1.9% Black, 1.2% Arab
Languages: 80.7% English, 4.9% Cree, 3.1% French, 1.6% Tagalog
Religions: 67.3% Christian (33.4% Catholic, 7.3% Anglican, 5.0% United Church, 3.8% Pentecostal, 1.5% Lutheran, 1.4% Baptist, 1.3% Christian Orthodox, 13.6% Other Christian), 3.4% Muslim, 1.5% Hindu, 26.2% No religion
Median income (2010): $47,348

== History ==
It was created as "Athabasca" riding in 1966 from Athabaska and Peace River ridings. In 2004, it was renamed "Fort McMurray—Athabasca".

Following the Canadian federal electoral redistribution, 2012, this riding was abolished. 69% was redistributed into the new riding of Fort McMurray—Cold Lake, 19% to Peace River—Westlock (notably the towns of Slave Lake and High Prairie among others) and 11% to Lakeland.

=== Members of Parliament ===
This riding has elected the following members of Parliament:

Parliament	Years	Member	Party
Athabasca; Riding created from Athabaska and Peace River
28th	1968–1972	Paul Yewchuk	Progressive Conservative
29th	1972–1974	Paul Yewchuk	Progressive Conservative
30th	1974–1979	Paul Yewchuk	Progressive Conservative
31st	1979–1980	Paul Yewchuk	Progressive Conservative
32nd	1980–1984	Jack Shields	Progressive Conservative
33rd	1984–1988	Jack Shields	Progressive Conservative
34th	1988–1993	Jack Shields	Progressive Conservative
35th	1993–1997	David Chatters	Reform
36th	1997–2000	David Chatters	Reform
36th	2000–2000	David Chatters	Alliance
37th	2000–2003	David Chatters	Alliance
37th	2003–2004	David Chatters	Conservative
38th	2004–2006	Brian Jean	Conservative
Riding renamed — Fort McMurray—Athabasca
39th	2006–2008	Brian Jean	Conservative
40th	2008–2011	Brian Jean	Conservative
41st	2011–2014	Brian Jean	Conservative
41st	2014–2015	David Yurdiga	Conservative
Riding dissolved into Fort McMurray—Cold Lake, Peace River—Westlock and Lakeland

== Election results ==
=== Fort McMurray—Athabasca, 2004–2015 ===
Canadian federal by-election, June 30, 2014 Resignation of Brian Jean
Party	Candidate	Votes	%	±%	Expenditures
Conservative	David Yurdiga	5,991	46.71	–25.13	$103,194.65
Liberal	Kyle Harrietha	4,529	35.31	+24.89	$103,287.86
New Democratic	Lori McDaniel	1,472	11.48	–1.77	$20,146.42
Green	Brian Deheer	453	3.53	–0.96	$1,189.37
Libertarian	Tim Moen	381	2.97	–	$3,078.39
Total valid votes		12,826	99.74		
Total rejected ballots		34	0.26	–0.20	
Turnout		12,860	14.67	–25.63	
Eligible voters		87,647			
Conservative hold		Swing		–25.01	
Source: Elections Canada

=== 2011 ===
2011 Canadian federal election
Party	Candidate	Votes	%	±%	Expenditures
Conservative	Brian Jean	21,988	71.84	+4.73	$72,753.11
New Democratic	Berend J. Wilting	4,053	13.24	+0.34	$6.00
Liberal	Karen Young	3,190	10.42	–0.18	$20,699.54
Green	Jule Asterisk	1,374	4.49	–1.88	$2,733.94
Total valid votes/expense limit		30,605	99.53	–	$107,021.13
Total rejected ballots		144	0.47	+0.13	
Turnout		30,749	40.30	+4.48	
Eligible voters		76,298			
Conservative hold		Swing		+2.53	
Source: Elections Canada

=== 2008 ===
2008 Canadian federal election
Party	Candidate	Votes	%	±%	Expenditures
Conservative	Brian Jean	17,160	67.12	+2.46	$49,272.11
New Democratic	Mark Voyageur	3,300	12.91	–1.68	$1,738.86
Liberal	John Webb	2,710	10.60	–4.18	$2,958.78
Green	Dylan Richards	1,628	6.37	+1.47	none listed
Independent	Shawn Reimer	350	1.37	–	$456.01
First Peoples National	John Malcolm	233	0.91	–0.16	none listed
Christian Heritage	Jacob Strydhorst	186	0.73	–	$763.10
Total valid votes/expense limit		25,567	99.66	–	$101,822.54
Total rejected ballots		86	0.34	+0.03	
Turnout		25,653	35.82	–12.50	
Eligible voters		71,621			
Conservative hold		Swing		+0.39	
Source: Elections Canada

=== 2006 ===
2006 Canadian federal election
Party	Candidate	Votes	%	±%	Expenditures
Conservative	Brian Jean	20,400	64.66	+4.16	$56,273.59
Liberal	Mel Harrison Buffalo	4,663	14.78	–9.27	$2,333.55
New Democratic	Roland Lefort	4,602	14.59	+4.02	$19,090.66
Green	Ian Hopfe	1,547	4.90	–0.28	$8.00
First Peoples National	John Malcolm	337	1.07	–	$1,571.85
Total valid votes/expense limit		31,549	99.69	–	$92,509.74
Total rejected ballots		97	0.31	–0.06	
Turnout		31,646	48.32	+0.47	
Eligible voters		65,496			
Conservative notional hold		Swing		N/A	
Source: Elections Canada

=== 2004 ===
2004 Canadian federal election: Athabasca
Party	Candidate	Votes	%	±%	Expenditures
Conservative	Brian Jean	17,942	60.30	–6.41	$81,580.13
Liberal	Doug Faulkner	7,158	24.05	–4.35	$53,930.40
New Democratic	Robert Cree	3,115	10.47	+7.94	$4,942.54
Green	Ian Hopfe	1,542	5.18	+4.18	$56.53
Total valid votes/expense limit		29,757	99.63	–	$88,843.54
Total rejected ballots		112	0.37	+0.07	
Turnout		29,869	47.85	–8.43	
Eligible voters		62,427			
Conservative gain from Alliance		Swing		+27.97	
Source: Elections Canada

=== 2000 ===
2000 Canadian federal election: Athabasca
Party	Candidate	Votes	%	±%	Expenditures
Alliance	David Chatters	18,775	54.46	–0.16	$34,623
Liberal	Harold Cardinal	9,793	28.40	–1.62	$66,236
Progressive Conservative	Doug Faulkner	4,224	12.25	+3.10	$26,660
New Democratic	Alysia Erickson	872	2.53	–2.17	–
Marijuana	Reginald Normore	469	1.36	–	–
Green	Harvey Alex Scott	345	1.00	–0.51	$194
Total valid votes		34,478	99.70		
Total rejected ballots		104	0.30	+0.03	
Turnout		34,582	56.28	+6.86	
Eligible voters/turnout		61,446			
Alliance notional gain from Reform		Swing		+26.42	
Source: Library of Parliament

=== 1997 ===
1997 Canadian federal election: Athabasca
Party	Candidate	Votes	%	±%	Expenditures
Reform	David Chatters	14,673	54.62	+7.55	$48,747
Liberal	Adam Germain	8,066	30.02	+5.43	$59,100
Progressive Conservative	Don McGladdery	2,459	9.15	–10.00	$17,026
New Democratic	Bryan Nelson	1,262	4.70	–2.93	–
Green	Dave Gregory	405	1.51	+0.55	$1,206
Total valid votes		26,865	99.73		
Total rejected ballots		72	0.27	+0.02	
Turnout		26,937	49.42	–10.16	
Eligible voters/turnout		54,504			
Reform hold		Swing		+6.49	
Source: Library of Parliament

=== 1993 ===
1993 Canadian federal election: Athabasca
Party	Candidate	Votes	%	±%
Reform	David Chatters	15,350	47.07	+41.61
Liberal	Lawrence Courtoreille	8,020	24.59	+12.25
Progressive Conservative	Jack Shields	6,248	19.16	–33.65
New Democratic	Ian Thorn	2,489	7.63	–19.65
Green	Harvey Alex Scott	312	0.96	–
Natural Law	Roger Shapka	195	0.60	–
Total valid votes		32,614	99.75	
Total rejected ballots		81	0.25	+0.05
Turnout		32,695	59.58	–10.23
Eligible voters/turnout		54,875		
Reform gain from Progressive Conservative		Swing		+26.93
Source: Library of Parliament

=== 1988 ===
1988 Canadian federal election: Athabasca
Party	Candidate	Votes	%	±%
Progressive Conservative	Jack Shields	17,248	52.81	–15.50
New Democratic	Ian Thorn	8,911	27.28	+10.20
Liberal	Dan Meakes	4,031	12.34	+0.32
Reform	Betty Lebsack	1,781	5.45	–
Christian Heritage	Simone Middelkoop	585	1.79	–
Communist	Laurent A. St. Denis	104	0.32	–
Total valid votes		32,660	99.80	
Total rejected ballots		66	0.20	–0.09
Turnout		32,726	69.81	+9.50
Eligible voters/turnout		46,880		
Progressive Conservative hold		Swing		–2.65
Source: Library of Parliament

=== 1984 ===
1984 Canadian federal election: Athabasca
Party	Candidate	Votes	%	±%
Progressive Conservative	Jack Shields	23,997	68.31	+23.65
New Democratic	Ann Dort-Maclean	6,001	17.08	+2.90
Liberal	Mike Woodward	4,222	12.02	–21.00
Confederation of Regions	Fred W. Borger	578	1.65	–
Social Credit	Rudolph Michetti	332	0.95	–0.61
Total valid votes		35,130	99.70	
Total rejected ballots		104	0.30	–0.09
Turnout		35,234	60.31	+0.46
Eligible voters/turnout		58,422		
Progressive Conservative hold		Swing		+13.28
Source: Library of Parliament

=== 1980 ===
1980 Canadian federal election: Athabasca
Party	Candidate	Votes	%	±%
Progressive Conservative	Jack Shields	13,287	44.66	–14.00
Liberal	Chuck Knight	9,822	33.02	+4.22
New Democratic	Harry W. Daniels	4,218	14.18	+4.01
Independent	Herman Huizingh	1,960	6.59	–
Social Credit	Clayton Eberhart	463	1.56	–0.81
Total valid votes		29,750	99.61	
Total rejected ballots		116	0.39	+0.04
Turnout		29,866	59.85	+0.70
Eligible voters/turnout		49,899		
Progressive Conservative hold		Swing		–4.89
Source: Library of Parliament

=== 1979 ===
1979 Canadian federal election: Athabasca
Party	Candidate	Votes	%	±%
Progressive Conservative	Paul Yewchuk	15,978	58.67	–4.68
Liberal	Chuck Knight	7,843	28.80	+3.56
New Democratic	Robert Godbout	2,770	10.17	–1.25
Social Credit	Clayton Eberhart	645	2.37	–
Total valid votes		27,236	99.65	
Total rejected ballots		95	0.35	–0.20
Turnout		27,331	59.15	+2.09
Eligible voters/turnout		46,204		
Progressive Conservative hold		Swing		–0.56
Source: Library of Parliament

=== 1974 ===
1974 Canadian federal election: Athabasca
Party	Candidate	Votes	%	±%
Progressive Conservative	Paul Yewchuk	13,157	63.34	+3.10
Liberal	Yvon Mahé	5,243	25.24	+2.56
New Democratic	Peter Eugene Opryshko	2,372	11.42	–1.05
Total valid votes		20,772	99.45	
Total rejected ballots		115	0.55	–1.35
Turnout		20,887	57.07	–9.51
Eligible voters/turnout		36,601		
Progressive Conservative hold		Swing		+2.83
Source: Library of Parliament

=== 1972 ===
1972 Canadian federal election: Athabasca
Party	Candidate	Votes	%	±%
Progressive Conservative	Paul Yewchuk	12,936	60.24	+13.14
Liberal	Jim Ducharme	4,871	22.68	–17.89
New Democratic	Peter Eugene Opryshko	2,677	12.47	+0.15
Social Credit	Albert Bourcier	989	4.61	–
Total valid votes		21,473	98.10	
Total rejected ballots		415	1.90	+0.86
Turnout		21,888	66.58	–1.84
Eligible voters/turnout		32,874		
Progressive Conservative hold		Swing		–2.38
Source: Library of Parliament

=== 1968 ===
1968 Canadian federal election: Athabasca
Party	Candidate	Votes	%	±%
Progressive Conservative	Paul Yewchuk	8,852	47.10	–6.95
Liberal	Michael Maccagno	7,626	40.58	+9.54
New Democratic	Terry Anderson	2,315	12.32	+7.61
Total valid votes		18,793	98.96	
Total rejected ballots		197	1.04	+0.42
Turnout		18,990	68.42	–7.36
Eligible voters/turnout		27,755		
Progressive Conservative hold		Swing		+1.29
Source: Library of Parliament

== See also ==
- List of Canadian electoral districts
- Historical federal electoral districts of Canada
