= Wabasca =

Wabasca (from Cree wapuskau, "white rapid") may refer to several places in northern Alberta, Canada:

- Wabasca, Alberta, a hamlet in Municipal District of Opportunity No. 17
- Wabasca Airport, an airport serving the hamlet
- North Wabasca Lake, and South Wabasca Lake
- Wabasca River, a tributary of the Peace River
- Wabasca 166, a series of Indian reserves of the Bigstone Cree Nation
- Wabasca oil field
