= Peerless Trout First Nation =

First Nation in Alberta, Canada

- Band No. 478
- People: Woods Cree
- Treaty: Treaty 8
- Headquarters: Peerless Lake
- Province: Alberta

Land
- Other reserve: Peerless Trout 238
- Land area: 35.532 km^{2} (13.719 sq mi)

Population (2019)
- On reserve: 53
- On other land: 755
- Off reserve: 162
- Total population: 970

Government
- Chief: Gilbert Okemow
- Council: Judy Sinclair; Paul Houle; Julianne Noskiye; Corrine Alook

Tribal Council
- Kee Tas Kee Now Tribal Council

Website
- ptfn.net

The Peerless Trout First Nation is a First Nations band government in northern Alberta, Canada, that is based out of Peerless Lake. It is part of the Treaty 8 Confederacy and was formed as Alberta's forty-fifth First Nation in 2010.

The Peerless Lake First Nation had a registered population of 966 as of July 2019. It has one reserve, Peerless Trout 238, in proximity to Peerless Lake and Trout Lake. Other reserves will be established in proximity to Calling Lake, Chipewyan Lake, and Wabasca.

The First Nation is governed by a council led by Chief Gilbert Okemow. Its first chief, originally elected in 2010, was James Alook. Its first female chief, was Chief Gladys Okemow, who was in office from 2018 to 2022.

== History ==
Before 2010, all Peerless Trout First Nation members were enrolled in the Bigstone Cree Nation, which took Treaty 8 in 1899. Entitled under Treaty to a guaranteed minimum land base, the band's first reserves were surveyed in 1913, with the intention that 128 acres (52 ha) would be allotted per band member. During the enumeration of band membership, though the Canadian government overlooked and excluded significant populations of registered Bigstone Treaty Indians north of Wabasca. This error was soon discovered, and Peerless Lake Chief Colin Trindle first requested the local Indian agent pursue the fulfillment of these treaty promises in 1935, but no new reserve lands were created as compensation.

Bigstone Cree's shortfall claim was acknowledged in 1998 under Canada's Historic Treaty Land Entitlement Policy and its Specific Claims Policy. In 2006 and 2007, the Nation's Ancillary Treaty Benefits claims were accepted for negotiation by Alberta and Canada. Between February 22 and March 5, 2010, ratification votes were held in the communities of Wabasca, Calling Lake, Chipewyan Lake, Peerless Lake, and Trout Lake, approving the governments' offer to settle the Bigstone claims. Under this agreement, members of the Bigstone communities around Peerless Lake and Trout Lake, who had never lived on Bigstone reserves, would become members of a new First Nation.

The resulting settlement is the largest in Alberta and one of the largest in Canada. In addition to the official constitution of the Peerless Trout First Nation on May 19, 2010, $249,400,000 and 140,000 acres (57,000 ha) will ultimately change hands. 63,000 acres were used to establish the new Peerless Trout 238 reserve, while the remaining 77,000 acres will be used to create new Bigstone Cree reserves around Wabasca, Calling Lake, and Chipewyan Lake. A final signing ceremony was held in September 2011.

The First Nation's first female leader was elected November 2018, when founding chief James Alook was defeated by addictions counselor Gladys Okemow.

The Peerless Trout communities were evacuated south to Edmonton multiple times during the 2019 Alberta wildfire season, with one out-of-control wildfire burning 6 kilometres (3.7 mi) southeast of Trout Lake.

== Enterprises ==
The First Nation wholly owns and manages Peerless Trout Enterprises Inc. (PTEI), its business development subsidiary. PTEI services include concrete, forestry, civil earthworks, oilfield services, traditional knowledge consultation, and firefighting.

Major PTEI ventures include PT Concrete, a band-owned concrete plant, and the PT Camp, an 88-suite remote camp. In addition to housing transient primary sector workers, PT Camp's remote location on Peerless Trout territory has been promoted as a destination for cultural and wilderness tourism.
