= Calling Lake (disambiguation) =

Calling Lake is a large lake in north-central Alberta, Canada.

Calling Lake may also refer to:

- Calling Lake, Alberta, a hamlet along the eastern shore of Calling Lake
- Calling Lake Airport, an airport in Alberta, Canada
- Calling Lake Provincial Park, a provincial park in Alberta, Canada
- Calling Lakes, a chain of four lakes in Saskatchewan, Canada
