= Sandy Lake, Alberta =

Sandy Lake Pelican Mountain
- Hamlet
- Location of Sandy Lake in Alberta
- Coordinates: 55.8144°N 113.4161°W
- Country: Canada
- Province: Alberta
- Census division: No. 17
- Municipal district: Municipal District of Opportunity No. 17

Government
  - Type: Unincorporated
  - Governing body: MD of Opportunity No. 17 Council

Area (2021)
  - Land: 13.25 km^{2} (5.12 sq mi)
- Elevation: 565 m (1,854 ft)

Population (2021)
  - Total: 163
  - Density: 12.3/km^{2} (32/sq mi)
- Time zone: UTC−06:00 (Alberta Time)

Sandy Lake, also known as Pelican Mountain, is a hamlet in Alberta, Canada within the Municipal District of Opportunity No. 17. It is located on Highway 813, between Calling Lake and Wabasca. It has an elevation of 565 metres (1,854 ft).

The hamlet is located in Census Division No. 17 as well as the federal riding of Fort McMurray-Athabasca.

== Demographics ==
Population history of Sandy Lake
Year	Pop.	±%
1951	60	—
1956	64	+6.7%
1961	85	+32.8%
1966	78	−8.2%
1971	86	+10.3%
1976	83	−3.5%
1981	107	+28.9%
1986	121	+13.1%
1991	100	−17.4%
1996	81	−19.0%
2001	135	+66.7%
2006	93	−31.1%
2011	68	−26.9%
2016	52	−23.5%
2016R	121	+132.7%
2021	163	+34.7%
Source: Statistics Canada

In the 2021 Census of Population conducted by Statistics Canada, Sandy Lake had a population of 163 living in 46 of its 67 total private dwellings, a change of 34.7% from its 2016 population of 121. With a land area of 13.25 km^{2} (5.12 sq mi), it had a population density of 12.3/km^{2} (31.9/sq mi) in 2021.

As a designated place in the 2016 Census of Population conducted by Statistics Canada, Sandy Lake had a population of 52 living in 25 of its 39 total private dwellings, a change of −23.5% from its 2011 population of 68. With a land area of 1.67 km^{2} (0.64 sq mi), it had a population density of 31.1/km^{2} (80.6/sq mi) in 2016.

== See also ==
- List of communities in Alberta
- List of designated places in Alberta
- List of hamlets in Alberta
