= Bigstone Cree Nation =

First Nations band government in Canada

- Band No. 458
- ᐅᐸᓯᑯᓂᐍᐤ opasikoniwew
- People: Woodland Cree
- Treaty: Treaty 8
- Headquarters: Wabasca
- Province: Alberta

Land
- Other reserves: Desmarais Settlement; Wabasca 166; Wabasca 166A; Wabasca 166B; Wabasca 166C; Wabasca 166D; Jean Baptiste Gambler 183
- Land area: 210.67 km^{2} (81.34 sq mi)

Population (2019)
- On reserve: 3524
- Off reserve: 4712
- Total population: 8236

Website
- bigstone.ca

The Bigstone Cree Nation (Cree: ᐅᐸᓯᑯᓂᐍᐤ, opasikoniwew) is a First Nations band government in Alberta, Canada. As Woodland Cree, they are a western branch of the larger Cree nation, and are a party to Treaty 8 with Canada. The Bigstone Cree Nation was divided into two bands in 2010, with one group continuing under the former name, and the other becoming the Peerless Trout First Nation.

== History ==
The forerunners of the Bigstone Cree signed onto Treaty 8 in 1899 and were provided with reserved lands based on a population survey. The Bigstone claimed that the lands they were assigned were not large enough based on the 1913 and 1937 population surveys. Band members settled into five communities all named after nearby lakes: Calling Lake, Chipewyan Lake, Peerless Lake, Trout Lake and Wabasca. The band has six reserves totalling 21,066.6 hectares (52,057 acres). These included 166 A, 166 B, 166 C, 166 D, all in the vicinity of the Hamlet of Wabasca (also known as Wabasca-Desmarais), 166 south of the Hamlet of Sandy Lake, and Jean Baptiste Gambler Reserve 183 surrounded by the Hamlet of Calling Lake. All of these reserves are surrounded by the Municipal District of Opportunity No. 17. In 2007, there were 6,781 registered Bigstone Cree, of which 2,397 were living on reserve.

The people living at Chipewyan Lake, Peerless Lake, and Trout Lake and lived off-reserve on Crown land and did not have access to the same services available to those at Wabasca. The Canadian government accepted the claim in 1998 and negotiations began which resulted in a settlement in 2010, the largest land settlement in Alberta's history. The agreement ended with the separation of the Peerless Trout First Nation from the Bigstone Cree, and new reserve lands for both bands. The Calling Lake reserve was slightly enlarged and a new reserve was created at Chipewyan Lake.

== Annual events ==
The Bigstone Cree First Nation host the annual Treaty Days Festivities in August of each year, celebrating their culture, language and achievements.

== Reserves ==
Indian Reserves under the administration of Bigstone Cree Nation are:

- Wabasca 166 (Cree: ᓴᑭᑕᐘᓯᕽ, sakitawasihk) 8452.40 ha
- Wabasca 166A (Cree: ᑲᐊᓯᓂᐢᑲᓯᐠ, ka-asiniskasik) 682.10 ha
- Wabasca 166B (Cree: ᒋᐸᐢᑲᐣᓯᕽ, cipaskansihk) 2413.40 ha
- Wabasca 166C (Cree: ᑭᓯᐱᑲᒪᕽ, kisipikamahk) 3502.60 ha
- Wabasca 166D (Cree: ᒧᐢᑯᑌᐠ, muskotêk) 5817.40 ha
- Jean Baptiste Gambler 183 198.70 ha
- Desmarais Settlement

== Notable people ==
Lance Cardinal, a visual artist who hosts the APTN children's art education series Indigenous Art Adventures, is a member of the Bigstone Cree Nation.

== See also ==
- First Nations in Alberta
- List of Indian reserves in Alberta
- List of First Nations peoples
- Indian Act
- List of Aboriginal communities in Canada
