= Wabasca 166B =

Coordinates: 55°57′31″N 113°57′17″W

- Indian reserve
- Wabasca Indian Reserve No. 166B
- Location in Alberta
- First Nation: Bigstone Cree
- Treaty: 8
- Country: Canada
- Province: Alberta
- Municipal district: Opportunity

Area
  - Total: 2,413.4 ha (5,964 acres)

Population (2016)
  - Total: 190
  - Density: 7.9/km^{2} (20/sq mi)
- Time zone: UTC−06:00 (Alberta Time)

Wabasca 166B is an Indian reserve of the Bigstone Cree Nation in Alberta, located within the Municipal District of Opportunity No. 17. In the 2016 Canadian Census, it recorded a population of 190 living in 43 of its 52 total private dwellings. The community is located on the southern shore of North Wabasca Lake and to the west of the hamlet of Wabasca.
