= Peerless Trout 238 =

Coordinates: 56°34′21″N 114°38′51″W

- Indian reserve
- Peerless Trout Indian Reserve No. 238
- Location in Alberta
- First Nation: Peerless Trout
- Treaty: 8
- Country: Canada
- Province: Alberta
- Municipal district: Opportunity

Area
  - Total: 3,553.2 ha (8,780 acres)
- Time zone: UTC−06:00 (Alberta Time)

Peerless Trout 238 is an Indian reserve of the Peerless Trout First Nation in Alberta, located within the Municipal District of Opportunity No. 17.
