= Westlock—St. Paul =

Former federal electoral district in Alberta, Canada

Coordinates: 53.934°N 111.888°W

Alberta electoral district
- Westlock–St. Paul in relation to the other Alberta federal electoral districts

Defunct federal electoral district
- Legislature: House of Commons
- District created: 2003
- District abolished: 2013
- First contested: 2004
- Last contested: 2011
- District webpage: profile, map

Demographics
- Population (2011): 108,518
- Electors (2011): 73,791
- Area (km²): 22,155.73
- Census division(s): Division No. 10, Division No. 11, Division No. 12, Division No. 13
- Census subdivision(s): Sturgeon County, Cold Lake, Bonnyville No. 87, County of Vermilion River, Westlock County, Morinville, Lac La Biche County, County of St. Paul No. 19, Bonnyville, St. Paul

Westlock—St. Paul (briefly known as Battle River) was a federal electoral district in Alberta, Canada, that was represented in the House of Commons of Canada from 2004 to 2015. It included Westlock County, Sturgeon County, Thorhild County, Smoky Lake County, the County of St. Paul No. 19, and the Municipal District of Bonnyville No. 87. Following the Canadian federal electoral redistribution, 2012 this riding was abolished into Lakeland (35%), Sturgeon River—Parkland (32%), Fort McMurray—Cold Lake (20%), Peace River—Westlock (13%), and a small section outside of St. Albert being transferred to St. Albert—Edmonton.

== History ==
This riding was created in 2003 as "Westlock—St. Paul" from parts of Lakeland, Elk Island, St. Albert, Yellowhead, and Athabasca ridings. The riding was known as "Battle River" from 2004 to 2005, despite the Battle River not actually running through the riding.

=== Members of Parliament ===
Parliament	Years	Member	Party
Riding created from Lakeland, Elk Island, St. Albert, Yellowhead, and Athabasca
38th	2004–2006	David Chatters	Conservative
39th	2006–2008	Brian Storseth	Conservative
40th	2008–2011	Brian Storseth	Conservative
41st	2011–2015	Brian Storseth	Conservative
Riding dissolved into Lakeland, Fort McMurray—Cold Lake, Peace River—Westlock, Sturgeon River—Parkland and St. Albert—Edmonton

== Election results ==
2011 Canadian federal election
Party	Candidate	Votes	%	±%	Expenditures
Conservative	Brian Storseth	32,652	77.82	+5.11	$37,859.30
New Democratic	Lyndsey Ellen Henderson	5,103	12.16	+2.03	$11.00
Liberal	Rob Fox	2,569	6.12	–2.97	$16,592.95
Green	Lisa Grant	1,634	3.89	–2.81	$924.03
Total valid votes/expense limit		41,958	99.61	–	$94,223.82
Total rejected ballots		166	0.39	+0.05	
Turnout		42,124	55.21	+4.09	
Eligible voters		76,291			
Conservative hold		Swing		+3.57	
Source: Elections Canada

2008 Canadian federal election
Party	Candidate	Votes	%	±%	Expenditures
Conservative	Brian Storseth	27,338	72.71	+4.49	$65,235.23
New Democratic	Della Drury	3,809	10.13	+0.10	$107.10
Liberal	Leila Houle	3,418	9.09	–5.91	$19,384.02
Green	Aden Murphy	2,522	6.71	+1.80	$2,786.76
Christian Heritage	Sip Hofstede	510	1.36	–	$5,477.11
Total valid votes/expense limit		37,597	99.65	–	$90,419.42
Total rejected ballots		131	0.35	+0.06	
Turnout		37,728	51.13	–9.31	
Eligible voters		73,791			
Conservative hold		Swing		–	
Source: Elections Canada

2006 Canadian federal election
Party	Candidate	Votes	%	±%	Expenditures
Conservative	Brian Storseth	29,698	68.22	+1.42	$39,577.84
Liberal	Cory Ollikka	6,531	15.00	–4.25	$25,848.92
New Democratic	Peter Eugene Opryshko	4,368	10.03	+1.24	$2,388.99
Green	Richard De Smet	2,136	4.91	–0.24	$962.85
Independent	Werner Gisler	416	0.96	–	$2,212.84
Independent	Clarence Schultz	381	0.88	–	$2,436.96
Total valid votes/expense limit		43,530	99.71	–	$83,905.50
Total rejected ballots		125	0.29	–0.09	
Turnout		43,655	60.44	+3.87	
Eligible voters		72,231			
Conservative hold		Swing		+2.84	
Source: Elections Canada

2004 Canadian federal election
Party	Candidate	Votes	%	±%	Expenditures
Conservative	David Chatters	26,433	66.80	–	$23,175.88
Liberal	Joe Dion	7,619	19.26	–	$42,140.79
New Democratic	Peggy Kirkeby	3,480	8.80	–	$2,112.71
Green	John Archibald McDonald	2,036	5.15	–	$981.14
Total valid votes/expense limit		39,568	99.62	–	$80,880.33
Total rejected ballots		151	0.38	–	
Turnout		39,719	56.56	–	
Eligible voters		70,219			
Conservative notional hold		Swing		–	
Source: Elections Canada

== See also ==
- List of Canadian electoral districts
- Historical federal electoral districts of Canada
