= Jack Shields =

Canadian politician

Member of Parliament for Athabasca
- In office 2 February 1980 – 24 October 1993
- Preceded by: Paul Yewchuk
- Succeeded by: David Chatters

Personal details
- Born: John Wendele Shields; 25 December 1929 Grande Prairie, Alberta, Canada
- Died: 29 November 2004 (aged 74) Edmonton, Alberta, Canada
- Party: Progressive Conservative

Military service
- Allegiance: Canada
- Branch/service: Canadian Army
- Years of service: 1947–1957
- Rank: Warrant officer
- Unit: Princess Patricia's Canadian Light Infantry
- Battles/wars: Korean War

John Wendele Shields (25 December 1929 – 29 November 2004) was a Progressive Conservative member of the House of Commons of Canada. He was a soldier, businessman, and teacher by career.

Born in Grande Prairie, Alberta, Shields served with the Canadian Army in Korea. He left the military in 1958 to complete high school and went on to earn a degree in education from the University of Alberta.

During his time as a Member of Parliament (MP), he represented the northeast Alberta riding of Athabasca. He was elected in the 1980, 1984, and 1988 federal elections. He served in the 32nd, 33rd and 34th Canadian Parliaments.

In 1991, Shields incurred controversy for allegedly shouting "Shut up, Sambo" to New Democratic Party MP Howard McCurdy, the only black member of Parliament serving at the time. Shields denied ever making the comments.

Shields left federal politics after his defeat in the 1993 federal election to David Chatters of the Reform Party; he lost over half of his vote from 1988.

He died of heart failure following bladder surgery at the age of 74.

== Member of the House of Commons, 1980–1993 ==
- Elected to the House of Commons in February 1980, served until October 1993
- Opposition Deputy Critic - Energy, 1980–1984
- Chairman of the Alberta Caucus, 1982–1992
- Governor General Appointments, 1984–1992
- Parliamentary Secretary to the Minister of Labour
- Parliamentary Secretary to the Minister of Energy
- Parliamentary Secretary to the Minister of International Trade
- Parliamentary Secretary to the Minister of Employment and Immigration
- Parliamentary Secretary to the Minister of Consumer and Corporate Affairs

== Canadian Armed Forces, 1947–1957 ==
- 1st Battalion, Princess Patricia's Canadian Light Infantry
- Airborne Regiment
- 2nd Battalion, Princess Patricia's Canadian Light Infantry
- Served in Korean War as Platoon Sgt., 1950–1951
- Discharged in 1957, having achieved rank of Warrant Officer

== Decorations and honours ==
- Canadian Armed Forces Decoration (CD)
- Korean Volunteer Services Medal (KVSM)
- Korean Champaign Medal
- United Nations Medal for Korea
- Ambassador for Peace Medal (Korean Veterans Association)

== Tributes ==
On 1 December 2004, Brian Jean, Member of Parliament for Shields' former riding of Fort McMurray—Athabasca, rose in the House of Commons to pay the following tribute:

Mr. Speaker, today I rise to pay tribute to Jack Shields, a member of this House from 1980 to 1993, who died two days ago after battling with cancer. Born in Alberta, Mr. Shields moved to Fort McMurray in 1963 after serving in the Korean war. He was the founding president of Keyano College, now an internationally recognized school. He was the president of the Chamber of Commerce, founding member and president of the Kinsmen Club, chairman of the Public School Board and owned many businesses employing hundreds of local persons throughout the years. He was a very colourful character known for his humour, creativity and generosity. He was a man who year after year would fly his own private plane to the Indian hamlet of Janvier and, dressed up as jolly old Saint Nick, would distribute hundreds of toys to infant aboriginal children. He was a man of the people for the people of Canada and was a true Albertan. He will be missed by his wife, Pat, and family members in Alberta.
