= Paul Yewchuk =

Canadian politician

Member of Parliament for Athabasca
- In office 25 June 1968 – 17 February 1980
- Preceded by: Jack Bigg
- Succeeded by: Jack Shields

Personal details
- Born: 10 July 1937 (age 88) Bonnyville, Alberta, Canada
- Party: Progressive Conservative
- Profession: Surgeon; Physician

Paul Yewchuk (born 10 July 1937) is a Canadian former surgeon, physician, and Progressive Conservative party member of the House of Commons of Canada.

He represented the Alberta riding of Athabasca which he first won in the 1968 federal election. After winning successive terms in the 1972, 1974 and 1979 federal elections, Yewchuk left national politics in 1980 and did not campaign in that year's federal elections. He served four terms from the 28th to 31st Canadian Parliaments.

In the 1986 British Columbia election he ran as one of the two Social Credit candidates in the riding of Victoria, the Victoria riding returned two MLAs at the time. He came fourth with 19.71% of the vote.

In 2005 he sought the Conservative nomination in Edmonton Centre but lost to Laurie Hawn who went on to defeat Anne McLellan.

He has been married to his wife Irene since 1967 and they have eight children.
