= David Chatters =

Canadian politician

Member of the Canadian Parliament for Westlock—St. Paul
- In office 2004–2006
- Preceded by: first member
- Succeeded by: Brian Storseth

Member of the Canadian Parliament for Athabasca
- In office 1993–2004
- Preceded by: Jack Shields
- Succeeded by: Brian Jean

Personal details
- Born: April 15, 1946 Westlock, Alberta, Canada
- Died: January 25, 2016 (aged 69) Westlock, Alberta, Canada
- Party: Conservative (2003-2006); Canadian Alliance (2000-2003); Reform (1993-2000)

David Cameron Chatters (April 15, 1946 – January 25, 2016) was a Canadian politician. He was a member of the House of Commons of Canada from 1993 to 2006, representing the riding of Athabasca until the 2004 election, after which he represented Westlock—St. Paul.

Born in Westlock, Alberta, Chatters, formerly a farmer and rancher, was first elected as a member of the Reform Party of Canada (1993–2000), which became the Canadian Alliance in 2000, which became the Conservative Party of Canada in 2003. For over 10 years, he was the Senior Opposition Critic for Natural Resources and was a Deputy Whip of the Official Opposition. He was the Chair of the Standing Committee on Access to Information, Privacy, and Ethics, but health reasons made Chatters retire at the 2006 election.

In May 1996, he was suspended from the Reform Party caucus for asserting, in the wake of the Delwin Vriend case on LGBT human rights, that schools should have the right to fire openly gay teachers. Another caucus colleague who had made a similar comment, Bob Ringma, was suspended at the same time; a third caucus colleague, Jan Brown, was also suspended at the same time for publicly criticizing Chatters and Ringma. All three were readmitted to the Reform caucus by September of that year. He died at the age of 69 on January 25, 2016. He had pancreatic cancer.

== Electoral record ==
2004 Canadian federal election
Party	Candidate	Votes	%	±%	Expenditures
Conservative	David Chatters	26,435	66.7	–	$25,254
Liberal	Joe Dion	7,694	19.4	–	$79,419
New Democratic	Peggy Kirkeby	3,482	8.8	–	$2,112
Green	John A. McDonald	2,037	5.1	–	$486
Total valid votes		39,568	100.0		
Total rejected ballots		151	0.38		
Turnout		39,719	56.56		

2000 Canadian federal election
Party	Candidate	Votes	%	±%	Expenditures
Alliance	David Chatters	18,775	54.45	-0.16	$34,623
Liberal	Harold Cardinal	9,793	28.40	-1.62	$66,236
Progressive Conservative	Doug Faulkner	4,224	12.25	+3.10	$26,660
New Democratic	Alysia Erickson	872	2.52	-2.17	
Marijuana	Reginald Normore	469	1.36	–	
Green	Harvey Alex Scott	345	1.00	-0.50	$194
Total valid votes		34,478	100.00		
Total rejected ballots		104	0.30	+0.03	
Turnout		34,582	56.28	+6.86	

1997 Canadian federal election
Party	Candidate	Votes	%	±%	Expenditures
Reform	David Chatters	14,673	54.61	+7.47	$48,747
Liberal	Adam Germain	8,066	30.02	+5.42	$59,100
Progressive Conservative	Don McGladdery	2,459	9.15	-9.96	$17,026
New Democratic	Bryan Nelson	1,262	4.69	-2.87	
Green	Dave Gregory	405	1.50	+0.53	$1,206
Total valid votes		26,865	100.00		
Total rejected ballots		72	0.27		
Turnout		26,937	49.42		

1993 Canadian federal election
Party	Candidate	Votes	%	±%
Reform	David Chatters	15,348	47.14	+41.68
Liberal	Lawrence Courtoreille	8,011	24.60	+12.26
Progressive Conservative	Jack Shields	6,223	19.11	-33.70
New Democratic	Ian Thorn	2,461	7.56	-19.73
Green	Harvey A. Scott	315	0.97	
Natural Law	Roger Shapka	202	0.62	
Total valid votes		32,560	100.00	
