= Brian Storseth =

Canadian businessman and politician

Brian S. Storseth

Member of Parliament for Westlock—St. Paul
- In office January 23, 2006 – August 4, 2015
- Preceded by: David Chatters
- Succeeded by: Arnold Viersen

Personal details
- Born: February 13, 1978 (age 48) Barrhead, Alberta
- Party: Conservative
- Spouse: Amel Storseth
- Profession: Businessman, insurance agent

Brian S. Storseth (born 1978) is a businessman and Conservative politician in Alberta, Canada. He was elected MP for Westlock—St. Paul, having defeated his next nearest opponent by a margin of over 53% in the 2006 federal election and was re-elected in 2008 and 2011 before retiring in 2015. He served on committees for Aboriginal affairs, agriculture and agri-food — the only Alberta MP on the latter two.

Born in Barrhead, Alberta. Storseth studied political science at the University of Alberta, and at the age of 24 was elected to town council. He owned and operated his own business in St. Paul, Alberta and while at the University of Alberta worked in the office of the Speaker of the Legislative Assembly of Alberta.

On September 30, 2011, during the 41st Parliament, Storseth introduced Private Member Bill C-304, titled An Act to amend the Canadian Human Rights Act (protecting freedom), repealing Section 13 of the Canadian Human Rights Act which had prohibited "the communication of hate messages by telephone or on the Internet". Bill C-304 received second reading on February 15, 2012, and in a free vote on June 6 was passed, 153–136, at third reading.

The federal electoral district of Westlock—St. Paul was replaced under the new Representation Order effective in 2015. The largest part of it moved to the new Lakeland district, with other parts going to the districts of Sturgeon River, Fort McMurray—Cold Lake and Peace River—Westlock. Storseth did not seek re-election in the newly formed Lakeland constituency at the 2015 general election.
