= Wabasca 166A =

Coordinates: 55°56′54″N 113°45′44″W

- Indian reserve
- Wabasca Indian Reserve No. 166A
- Location in Alberta
- First Nation: Bigstone Cree
- Treaty: 8
- Country: Canada
- Province: Alberta
- Municipal district: Opportunity

Area
  - Total: 682.1 ha (1,686 acres)

Population (2016)
  - Total: 658
  - Density: 96.5/km^{2} (250/sq mi)
- Time zone: UTC−06:00 (Alberta Time)

Wabasca 166A is an Indian reserve of the Bigstone Cree Nation in Alberta, located within the Municipal District of Opportunity No. 17. In the 2016 Canadian Census, it recorded a population of 658 living in 183 of its 213 total private dwellings.
