= Calling Lake =

Lake in Alberta, Canada

- Location within Alberta
- Location: Municipal District of Opportunity No. 17, Alberta
- Coordinates: 55°14′32″N 113°18′40″W
- Basin countries: Canada
- Max. length: 13.6 km (8.5 mi)
- Max. width: 13 km (8.1 mi)
- Surface area: 138 km^{2} (53 sq mi)
- Max. depth: 18.3 m (60 ft)
- Surface elevation: 529 m (1,736 ft)
- Settlements: Calling Lake
- References: Calling Lake

Calling Lake is a large lake in north-central Alberta, Canada.

The lake's name comes from the First Nations of the area, who heard the lake ice cracking.

It has a total area of 134 km^{2} (52 sq mi) and is located in a large bend of the Athabasca River, 60 km north of the town of Athabasca on Highway 813.

The Calling Lake Provincial Park is located on the southern shore of the lake, and the Jean Baptiste Gambler 183 First Nations reserve of the Bigstone Cree Nation is established in the hamlet of Calling Lake on the eastern shore.

The waters of the lake are drained through the Calling River into the Athabasca River.

== See also ==
- List of lakes in Alberta
