= Harold Cardinal =

Canadian politician

Harold Cardinal (January 27, 1945 – June 3, 2005) was a Cree writer, political leader, teacher, negotiator, and lawyer. Throughout his career he advocated, on behalf of all First Nation peoples, for the right to be "the red tile in the Canadian mosaic."

Cardinal was a lifelong student of First Nations law as practised by Cree and other Aboriginal Elders; he complimented this with extensive study of law in mainstream educational institutions. He was also a mentor and inspiration to many Aboriginal and non-Aboriginal students, professionals, and political leaders.

He died of lung cancer in 2005 at the age of 60.

== Early life and education ==
Cardinal was born in High Prairie, Alberta to Frank and Agnes (Cunningham) Cardinal. He grew up on the Sucker Creek Reserve. He attended high school in Edmonton, and studied sociology at St. Patrick's College in Ottawa, now a part of Carleton University.

== Political career ==
Cardinal's activism began early in life; he was elected president of the Canadian Indian Youth Council in 1966. His leadership qualities began to surface in 1968 when, at age 23, he was elected leader of the Indian Association of Alberta for an unprecedented nine terms, during which he was instrumental in the formation of the National Indian Brotherhood (the forerunner of the Assembly of First Nations).

Cardinal then served the people of his home community, the Sucker Creek Indian Band, as their Chief.

Cardinal served as the Vice Chief of the Assembly of First Nations during the period of the patriation of the Canadian Constitution in the early 1980s.

Cardinal was instrumental in the creation, in 1984, of the Prairie Treaty Nations Alliance, representing all First Nations of Alberta, Saskatchewan and Manitoba, to advance issues of concern to those First Nations with particular emphasis on their treaties with the Crown.

Cardinal also participated in Canadian federal politics, in 2000 running unsuccessfully as a candidate for the Liberal Party in the riding of Athabasca. He ran against David Chatters, who had been accused of being anti-Native, in explicit opposition to the apparent revival of popular and political support for policies of Aboriginal assimilation.

== The "White Paper" and The Unjust Society ==
Cardinal rose to national prominence in the late 1960s. In 1968, Prime Minister Pierre Trudeau proclaimed Canada to be a "just society." However, after a promising round of consultations between the government of Canada and aboriginal leaders in which issues of Aboriginal and Treaty rights and the right of self-government were prominently discussed, Aboriginal people were outraged when Trudeau's Minister of Indian Affairs, the Hon. Jean Chrétien (later Prime Minister of Canada) introduced a "White Paper" which advocated the elimination of separate legal status for native people in Canada. The white paper amounted to an assimilation program which, if implemented, would have repealed the Indian Act, transferred responsibility for Indian Affairs to the provinces and terminated the rights of Indians under the various treaties they had made with the Crown.

In 1969, Cardinal wrote his first book The Unjust Society (cf. Just Society), intending to "sweep back the buckskin curtain" between aboriginal people and mainstream society. The Unjust Society was Cardinal's personal response to the Trudeau White Paper. It became an immediate Canadian best-seller and was reprinted in 2000 with a new introduction by Cardinal. The Unjust Society was instrumental in causing the Canadian government to abandon the policy of the White Paper.

Cardinal was also the principal author of the Indian Association of Alberta's response to the White Paper, entitled Citizens Plus, also known as The Red Paper. Cardinal's words galvanized the First Nations of Canada into action. The result was a complete about-face by the federal government on the policies of the White Paper and the establishment of joint meetings between First Nations and the federal cabinet in the early 1970.

His second book, published in 1977, was The Rebirth of Canada's Indians.

Cardinal's gift for satire was displayed in his early writings, turning Trudeau's promise of a "just society" into an "unjust society" and a "white paper" into "red paper", and then equating the brutal slaughter of American Indians by the U.S. Cavalry with bayonet and guns with the cultural genocide which the Canadian government was perpetrating on aboriginal people with paper.

Cardinal's lifelong demand for radical changes in policy on aboriginal rights, education, social programs and economic development was a beacon of hope for Canada's First Nations people.

== Intellectual legacy ==
In 1969, along with Indigenous communities, Elders, and other leaders, Cardinal radically questioned the hegemony of the nation state through his efforts to stop The White Paper, which culminated in his book The Unjust Society. The book was instrumental in bringing Indigenous people's voices and issues to a centre stage in Canadian life; it also critically engaged the theoretical foundation and practice of Canadian liberalism as found in then Prime Minister Trudeau's conceptualizations of a "just society" where all citizens would be considered "equal" in the context of the current nation state. Cardinal argued the state's premise of equality and justice was a false one because it failed to take into account the historical conditions under which the nation state was created: conditions that denied Indigenous people's rights as entrenched in the treaties and conditions that, subsequently, oppressed and subjugated them.

Cardinal was not only an architect of change on the political level, he was also instrumental in engaging and redefining the manner in which Indigenous and non-Indigenous people related to one another. One of the foundations of his life work was the insistence of the need for mutual recognition, understanding, and respect between Indigenous and non-Indigenous people. While he acknowledged difference, he still fundamentally believed in the power of relationship: "Two more disparate people, speaking in different tongues, speaking from different worlds, would be hard to find anywhere, and yet their dreams, their visions, their hopes, and their aspirations could not find any greater fusion"(Cardinal, 1977, p.-). Cardinal is also one of the first Indigenous scholars who actively sought "…a convergence between the knowledge systems of the Cree people and other First Nations and the knowledge systems found in Western educational institutions" (Cardinal, 2007, p. 65). Upon recognition of the power of colonization over both societies, Cardinal foresaw a bridge of understanding between them.

Cardinal's influence was wide within Indigenous communities. He was one of the first contemporary Indigenous scholars to articulate the notion that Indigenous people could still hold onto traditions while fully engaging in modernity. Cardinal also opened the mindset of the Canadian public to the idea that Indigenous Elders were effectively "public intellectuals," tacitly, raising the profile of Indigenous knowledge. He made further intellectual road maps between Indigenous scholarship and traditional knowledge by articulating the Elders' desires to see Indigenous scholars become familiar with conceptual and theoretical frameworks of Indigenous thought through Indigenous languages in order to maintain cultural strength.

== Professional life ==
In the 1970s, Cardinal was the first Aboriginal person to be appointed to the post of regional director general of Indian Affairs. His tenure was brief and controversial.

In 1984, Cardinal was appointed by the chiefs of Treaty 8 to negotiate an agreement to "renovate" that treaty. The failure of the negotiations after a promising beginning caused Cardinal to undertake a lengthy period of personal reflection, including much study with elders.

Cardinal also acted as a negotiator and consultant to many First Nations relating to land and other issues, usually relating to treaty rights.

Cardinal made a significant contribution to the work of the Royal Commission on Aboriginal Peoples, as well as the work of the Assembly of First Nations, particularly on the need for recognition of the sovereignty of First Nations as expressed through their treaties with the Crown. His lifelong position has been that the spirit and intent of the treaties must be the principal instrument governing relations between First Nations and the Crown.

== Legal career ==
After a career in First Nations politics and extensive study with First Nation elders, Cardinal undertook the formal study of law in his 40s. While studying law at the University of Saskatchewan he also served as an assistant professor at that University. He completed his LLM at Harvard University. A Doctorate in Law from the University of British Columbia was awarded to Cardinal days before his death in June, 2005.

On November 4, 2004, two months before his 60th birthday, Cardinal was admitted to the Bar of Alberta.

== Other honours ==
In 1999, Cardinal received an honorary doctor of laws from the University of Alberta in recognition of his unique achievements in leadership, public policy and law.

In 2001 Cardinal received a National Aboriginal Achievement Award, now the Indspire Awards, lifetime achievement award.

== Publications ==
- The Unjust Society: The Tragedy of Canada's Indians, Publisher: M.G.Hurtig Ltd.1969 (reprinted with a new introduction 2000).
- The Rebirth of Canada's Indians, 1977.
- Treaty Elders of Saskatchewan: Our Dream Is That Our Peoples Will One Day Be Clearly Recognized As Nations, 2000 (with Walter Hildebrandt.)

== Sources ==
Cardinal, Harold. "Nation-Building as Process: Reflections of a Nihiyow (Cree), in DePasquale (ed.), Natives & Settlers, 2007.

Cardinal, Harold. The Unjust Society. Vancouver: Douglas & McIntyre, 1969.

Cardinal, Harold. The Rebirth of Canada's Indians. Edmonton: Hurtig, 1977.

Cardinal, Harold and Walter Hildebrandt. Treaty Elders of Saskatchewan. Calgary: University of Calgary Press, 2000.

DePasquale, Paul (ed.). Natives & Settlers: Now & Then: Historical Issues and Current Perspectives on Treaties and Land Claims in Canada Edmonton: University of Alberta Press, 2007.

McLeod, Neal. Cree Narrative Memory. Saskatoon: Puritch Publishing, 2007.

== See also ==
- Notable Aboriginal people of Canada
