= Wabasca 166C =

Coordinates: 56°09′08″N 113°50′03″W

- Indian reserve
- Wabasca Indian Reserve No. 166C
- Location in Alberta
- First Nation: Bigstone Cree
- Treaty: 8
- Country: Canada
- Province: Alberta
- Municipal district: Opportunity

Area
  - Total: 3,502.6 ha (8,655 acres)

Population (2016)
  - Total: 188
  - Density: 5.37/km^{2} (13.9/sq mi)
- Time zone: UTC−06:00 (Alberta Time)

Wabasca 166C is an Indian reserve of the Bigstone Cree Nation in Alberta, located within the Municipal District of Opportunity No. 17. In the 2016 Canadian Census, it recorded a population of 188 people living in 47 of its 58 total private dwellings. The community is located along the northeast shore of North Wabasca Lake.
