= Wabasca 166D =

Coordinates: 55°54′25″N 113°52′41″W

- Indian reserve
- Wabasca Indian Reserve No. 166D
- Location in Alberta
- First Nation: Bigstone Cree
- Treaty: 8
- Country: Canada
- Province: Alberta
- Municipal district: Opportunity

Area
  - Total: 5,817.4 ha (14,375 acres)

Population (2016)
  - Total: 188
  - Density: 3.23/km^{2} (8.37/sq mi)
- Time zone: UTC−06:00 (Alberta Time)

Wabasca 166D is an Indian reserve of the Bigstone Cree Nation in Alberta, located within the Municipal District of Opportunity No. 17. It is 78 kilometres north of Slave Lake. In the 2016 Canadian Census, it recorded a population of 188 living in 47 of its 58 total private dwellings.
