= Jean Baptiste Gambler 183 =

Coordinates: 55°15′56″N 113°13′20″W

- Indian reserve
- Jean Baptiste Gambler Indian Reserve No. 183
- Location in Alberta
- First Nation: Bigstone Cree
- Treaty: 8
- Country: Canada
- Province: Alberta
- Municipal district: Opportunity

Area
  - Total: 198.7 ha (491 acres)

Population (2016)
  - Total: 253
  - Density: 127/km^{2} (330/sq mi)
- Time zone: UTC−06:00 (Alberta Time)

Jean Baptiste Gambler 183 is an Indian reserve of the Bigstone Cree Nation in Alberta, located within the Municipal District of Opportunity No. 17. In the 2016 Canadian Census, it recorded a population of 253 living in 68 of its 86 total private dwellings.
