= Calling Lake, Alberta =

Calling Lake
- Hamlet
- Location of Calling Lake in Alberta Calling Lake (Canada) Calling Lake (North America)
- Coordinates: 55.2144°N 113.1969°W
- Country: Canada
- Province: Alberta
- Census division: No. 17
- Municipal district: Municipal District of Opportunity No. 17

Government
  - Type: Unincorporated
  - Governing body: M.D. of Opportunity No. 17 Council

Area (2021)
  - Land: 64.62 km^{2} (24.95 sq mi)
- Elevation: 595 m (1,952 ft)

Population (2021)
  - Total: 375
  - Density: 5.8/km^{2} (15/sq mi)
- Time zone: UTC−06:00 (Alberta Time)

Calling Lake is a hamlet in northern Alberta, Canada within the Municipal District of Opportunity No. 17. It is located on Highway 813 along the eastern shore of Calling Lake, immediately north of Calling Lake Provincial Park. It is approximately 59 km (37 mi) north of Athabasca and 113 km (70 mi) south of Wabasca and has an elevation of 595 m (1,952 ft).

The hamlet is located in the federal riding of Fort McMurray-Athabasca. The hamlet is the seat of the Jean Baptiste Gambler 183 Indian reserve of the Bigstone Cree Nation.

Calling Lake is recognized as two separate designated places by Statistics Canada – Calling Lake (which includes lands on either side of the Jean Baptiste Gambler 183 Indian reserve) and Centre Calling Lake (which is located between the designated place of Calling Lake to the north and Calling Lake Provincial Park to the south).

== Infrastructure ==
Health services are provided by the Aspen Regional Health Authority, and the community is served by the Calling Lake Airport (TC LID: CFK4).

== Demographics ==
In the 2021 Census of Population conducted by Statistics Canada, Calling Lake had a population of 375 living in 161 of its 410 total private dwellings, a change of −16.3% from its 2016 population of 448. With a land area of 64.62 km^{2} (24.95 sq mi), it had a population density of 5.8/km^{2} (15.0/sq mi) in 2021.

As a designated place in the 2016 Census of Population conducted by Statistics Canada, by combining the designated places of "Calling Lake" and "Centre Calling Lake", Calling Lake recorded a population of 448 living in 159 of its 419 total private dwellings, a change of 21.4% from its 2011 population of 369. With a land area of 15.55 km^{2} (6.00 sq mi), it had a population density of 28.8/km^{2} (74.6/sq mi) in 2016.

== Climate ==
Climate data for Calling Lake
Month	Jan	Feb	Mar	Apr	May	Jun	Jul	Aug	Sep	Oct	Nov	Dec	Year
Record high °C (°F)	10.0 (50.0)	14.0 (57.2)	17.0 (62.6)	29.0 (84.2)	32.0 (89.6)	33.0 (91.4)	32.0 (89.6)	32.5 (90.5)	31.1 (88.0)	27.0 (80.6)	15.0 (59.0)	9.0 (48.2)	33.0 (91.4)
Mean daily maximum °C (°F)	−9.4 (15.1)	−5.2 (22.6)	1.4 (34.5)	9.4 (48.9)	16.0 (60.8)	20.0 (68.0)	22.2 (72.0)	21.3 (70.3)	15.5 (59.9)	8.4 (47.1)	−2.4 (27.7)	−8.1 (17.4)	7.4 (45.3)
Daily mean °C (°F)	−15.7 (3.7)	−12.4 (9.7)	−5.7 (21.7)	2.7 (36.9)	9.0 (48.2)	13.6 (56.5)	16.1 (61.0)	14.8 (58.6)	9.4 (48.9)	2.9 (37.2)	−7 (19)	−13.7 (7.3)	1.2 (34.2)
Mean daily minimum °C (°F)	−21.4 (−6.5)	−19.5 (−3.1)	−12.7 (9.1)	−4 (25)	1.9 (35.4)	7.3 (45.1)	9.9 (49.8)	8.3 (46.9)	3.1 (37.6)	−2.6 (27.3)	−11.5 (11.3)	−19.1 (−2.4)	−5 (23)
Record low °C (°F)	−46.7 (−52.1)	−45.5 (−49.9)	−42 (−44)	−30 (−22)	−11.5 (11.3)	−4.4 (24.1)	−2 (28)	−5.5 (22.1)	−9.4 (15.1)	−21.5 (−6.7)	−35 (−31)	−48 (−54)	−48 (−54)
Average precipitation mm (inches)	21.7 (0.85)	12.8 (0.50)	14.1 (0.56)	21.2 (0.83)	46.9 (1.85)	73.7 (2.90)	93.6 (3.69)	56.3 (2.22)	35.5 (1.40)	18.8 (0.74)	17.3 (0.68)	16.4 (0.65)	428.3 (16.86)
Average rainfall mm (inches)	0.5 (0.02)	0.1 (0.00)	1.5 (0.06)	10.3 (0.41)	43.1 (1.70)	73.7 (2.90)	93.6 (3.69)	56.3 (2.22)	35.4 (1.39)	12.1 (0.48)	1.6 (0.06)	0.6 (0.02)	328.5 (12.93)
Average snowfall cm (inches)	23.3 (9.2)	13.6 (5.4)	13.7 (5.4)	11.2 (4.4)	3.9 (1.5)	0 (0)	0 (0)	0 (0)	0.1 (0.0)	6.8 (2.7)	16.5 (6.5)	17.8 (7.0)	107.0 (42.1)
Source: Environment Canada

== See also ==
- List of communities in Alberta
- List of designated places in Alberta
- List of hamlets in Alberta
