= Calling Lake Provincial Park =

Provincial park in Alberta, Canada

- IUCN category II (national park)
- Location within Alberta
- Interactive map of Calling Lake Provincial Park
- Location: Municipal District of Opportunity No. 17, Alberta
- Nearest city: Athabasca
- Coordinates: 55°10′47″N 113°16′21″W
- Area: 7.38 km^{2} (2.85 sq mi)
- Governing body: Alberta Tourism, Parks and Recreation, MD of Opportunity No 17

Calling Lake Provincial Park is a provincial park in Alberta, Canada. It is a boreal forest reserve located 55 km (34 mi) north of Athabasca on Highway 813, and 186 km (116 mi) north of Edmonton, on the southern shore of Calling Lake. The marshy shores of the lake provide nesting grounds for waterfowl and habitat for American white pelicans and great blue herons.

== Activities ==
Activities in the park include bird watching, camping, canoeing, swimming, other beach and water-related sports and fishing for longnose sucker, northern pike, shiner, cisco, walleye and yellow perch.

A campground and day-use area is located in the hamlet of Calling Lake.

== See also ==
- List of provincial parks in Alberta
- List of Canadian provincial parks
- List of National Parks of Canada
