= North Wabasca Lake =

Lake in northern Alberta, Canada

- Location within Alberta
- Location: Municipal District of Opportunity No. 17, Alberta
- Coordinates: 56°02′51″N 113°55′39″W
- Type: Mesotrophic
- Primary inflows: Wabasca River, Willow River
- Primary outflows: Wabasca River
- Catchment area: 3,819.42 km^{2} (1,474.69 sq mi)
- Basin countries: Canada
- Max. length: 21 km (13 mi)
- Max. width: 6 km (3.7 mi)
- Surface area: 101.45 km^{2} (39.17 sq mi)
- Average depth: 5.8 m (19 ft)
- Max. depth: 17 m (56 ft)
- Shore length^{1}: 55.69 km (34.60 mi)
- Settlements: Wabasca, Wabasca 166B, Wabasca 166C
- ^{1} Shore length is not a well-defined measure.

North Wabasca Lake is located in northern Alberta, Canada, 322 km (200 mi) north of Edmonton and is the fifteenth largest lake in Alberta. The hamlet of Wabasca is located on the southeast shore of the lake, and along the path of the river flowing north from South Wabasca Lake. Two First Nations Reserves border the lake, Wabasca 166C in the northeast, and Wabasca 166B in the south.

== Geography ==
Surface area of the lake measures 101 km^{2} (39 sq mi) and is over 10 km (6.2 mi) long and 6 km (3.7 mi) at its widest point. North Wabasca Lake averages 5.8 m (19 ft) in depth and is 17 m (56 ft) at its deepest. The South Wabasca Lake outlet and Willow River in the south are the primary inflows. The lake drains northwards into the Peace River by way of the Wabasca River and is located in the watershed which comprises part of the south-central headwaters of the Mackenzie River System.

== Ecology ==
=== Flora ===
Located in the Wabasca Lowland Ecoregion, the land in the watershed supporting the lake is mostly covered in forests of Trembling aspen, Balsam poplar, and White spruce. This is followed by shrub-land and grassland interlaced with areas of muskeg and Black spruce. Urban and industrial development make up a small percentage of the land use with agricultural use being almost entirely non-existent.

=== Fauna ===
Common sport fishing species found in the lake are Northern Pike, Walleye, Yellow Perch, Lake Whitefish and Burbot. Other species of fish found in the lake include Northern Cisco, White Sucker, and Longnose Sucker. Over 25 species of zooplankton are found in North Wabasca Lake and are an important indicator of the health of the lake. Some examples of species native to the lake include Rotifer, Cladocera, Calanoida Copepod, Cyclopoida Copepod, and Nauplii. These small and microscopic animals are an important link in the food web of the lake.

== Conservation and development ==
The Southeast and Northeast shores have both seen extensive development by the hamlet of Wabasca and Wabasca 166B in the south and Wabasca 166C in the north. According to the 2016 Government of Canada Census, a total of 1680 people live on the lakes shores. There are currently no protected areas in the vicinity of the lake beyond small municipal parks.

The lake hosts many recreational activities year round. Eli Cardinal Park features a concrete boat launch and swimming dock, while the Lions Club Campground further north provides a sandy beach and lakeside camping facilities in the summer months as well as an additional smaller boat launch. Fishing is popular and it is common to find ice fishing shacks on the lake in the winter months.

Highway 754 runs south along the east of the lake and crosses the Wabasca river where the road meets Highway 813. It then runs along the southern shore of the lake, crossing the Willow River and heading on towards Slave Lake.
