= Wabasca River =

Watercourse in Alberta, Canada

Coordinates: 58°21′04″N 115°19′48″W

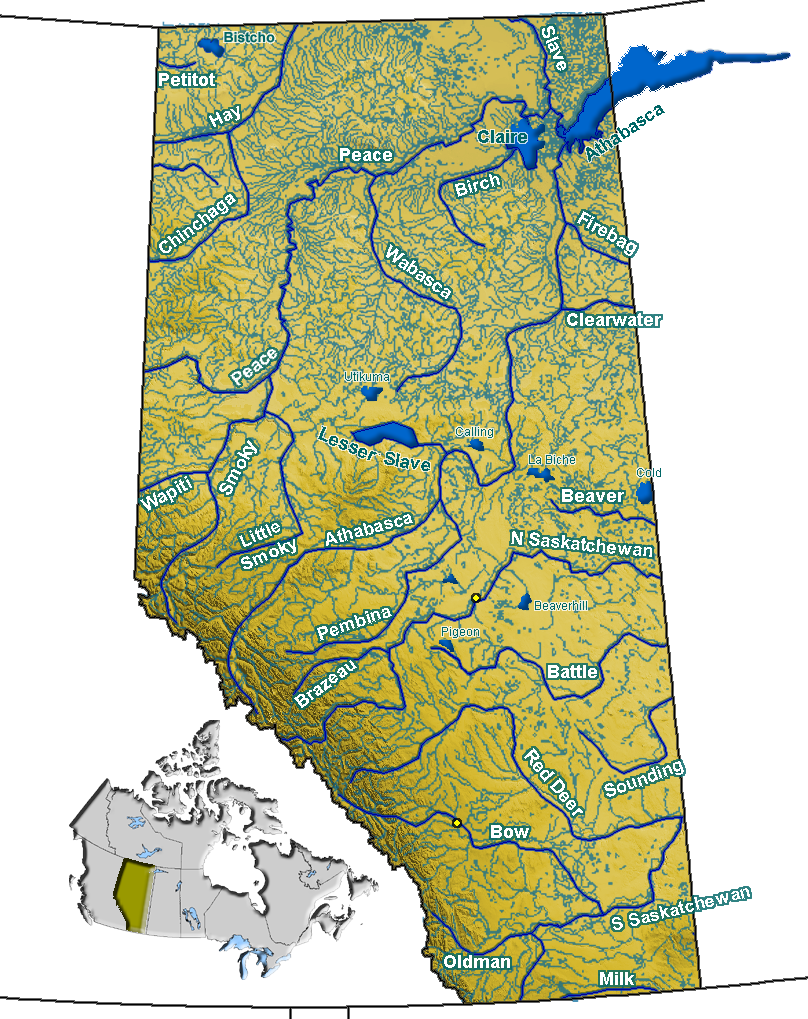
Wabasca River in Alberta

The Wabasca River is the largest tributary of the Peace River watershed in northern Alberta, Canada.

The Wabasca River has a total drainage area of 36,300 square kilometres (14,000 sq mi).

== Course ==
The Wabasca River originates in the Sandy Lake, north-east of Slave Lake, then flows in the South and North Wabasca Lake at the hamlet of Wabasca. It continues north through boreal forest and muskeg and discharges in the Peace River east of Fort Vermilion.

== Tributaries ==
- Willow River
- Muskwa River
- Pastecho River
- Trout River
- Wood Buffalo River
- Woodenhouse River
- Liége River
- Panny River
- Loon River
- Muddy River
- Bear River

== Wabasca Lakes ==
Two lakes, South and North Wabasca, are formed along the river. The South Wabasca Lake has a total surface of 61.6 square kilometres (23.8 sq mi), whereas the North Wabasca Lake has 101.4 square kilometres (39.2 sq mi). The community of Wabasca and the Wabasca Airport are located between the two lakes.

The Wabasca 166 (a, b, c and d) indian reserves of the Bigstone Cree First Nations are established on the shores of the lakes, and Tall Cree 173 of the Tallcree tribe is near the mouth of the river.

== See also ==
- List of Alberta rivers
