= Wabasca 166 =

Coordinates: 55°52′54″N 113°31′18″W

- Indian reserve
- Wabasca Indian Reserve No. 166
- Location in Alberta
- First Nation: Bigstone Cree
- Treaty: 8
- Country: Canada
- Province: Alberta
- Municipal district: Opportunity

Area
  - Total: 8,452.4 ha (20,886 acres)

Population (2016)
  - Total: 160
  - Density: 1.9/km^{2} (4.9/sq mi)
- Time zone: UTC−06:00 (Alberta Time)

Wabasca 166 is an Indian reserve of the Bigstone Cree Nation in Alberta, located within the Municipal District of Opportunity No. 17. It is 80 kilometres north of Slave Lake. In the 2016 Canadian Census, it recorded a population of 160 living in 42 of its 49 total private dwellings.
