= Chipewyan Lake =

- Designated place
- Location of Chipewyan Lake in M.D. of Opportunity Location of Chipewyan Lake in Alberta
- Coordinates: 56°56′25″N 113°28′24″W
- Country: Canada
- Province: Alberta
- Region: Northern Alberta
- Census division: 17
- Municipal district: Municipal District of Opportunity No. 17

Government
  - Type: Unincorporated
  - Governing body: Municipal District of Opportunity No. 17 Council

Area (2021)
  - Land: 4.29 km^{2} (1.66 sq mi)

Population (2021)
  - Total: 72
  - Density: 16.8/km^{2} (44/sq mi)
- Time zone: UTC−06:00 (Alberta Time)
- Area codes: 780, 587, 825

Chipewyan Lake is an unincorporated community in northern Alberta within the Municipal District of Opportunity No. 17. It is located on the southern shore of Chipewyan Lake approximately 110 kilometres (68 mi) north of Wabasca and 128 kilometres (80 mi) west of Fort McMurray. The community is not accessible by Alberta's provincial highway system. It is however accessible by using the Laricina Energy/Shell Canada S-4 access road.

Chipewyan Lake was placed under mandatory evacuation order on May 30, 2019, due to out-of-control wildfires in the area. It was placed under another mandatory evacuation order on May 14, 2023, due to an out-of-control wildfire north of the community.

== Demographics ==
In the 2021 Census of Population conducted by Statistics Canada, Chipewyan Lake had a population of 72 living in 22 of its 28 total private dwellings, a change of −16.3% from its 2016 population of 86. With a land area of 4.29 km^{2} (1.66 sq mi), it had a population density of 16.8/km^{2} (43.5/sq mi) in 2021.

As a designated place in the 2016 Census of Population conducted by Statistics Canada, Chipewyan Lake had a population of 0 living in 2 of its 6 total private dwellings, a change of −100% from its 2011 population of 38. With a land area of 2.39 km^{2} (0.92 sq mi), it had a population density of 0.0/km^{2} (0.0/sq mi) in 2016.

== History ==
Chipewyan Lake was likely established in 1902 as an outpost of Wabasca Hudson's Bay Company. It was located on the south shore of Chipewyan Lake, Alberta, about 120 miles northeast of Wabasca. The Hudson’s Bay Company and the Revillon Frerès Trading Company operated sites at Chipewyan Lake in very close proximity to each other until 1935-36, when the HBC took over the Revillon Frerès Trading Company buildings. The HBC did not own the land upon which they operated the Chipewyan Lake post and attempted to apply for license of occupation in 1950 but never obtained it.

It is likely that Chipewyan Lake operated as an outpost for Wabasca from inception to the early 1950s. In 1950 a new store was erected at the post as an outpost of Wabasca and terminated operation by 1954.

In1959, a community development missionary from Calling Lake, Mr. Isaac Glick, along with an entrepreneur, Mr. James McIntosh arranged to lease and later purchase (June 1960) the HBC store, house and buildings and arrange to have a teacher come to the community on the request and commitment from the trappers that they would bring their children back and attend school in their home community. In 1960, Fred and Elsie Gingerich arrived in Chipewyan Lakes as teachers under contract to the newly formed Northland School Division. They taught in the main store building and operated the store out of the nearby original log store. By 1962, a new school building had been brought in over winter roads and assembled on site. A second school building was brought in a few years later.

Currently (2024), the community does not have a store but has a private road build by logging and oil-companies that is sand and gravel and roughly maintained, giving year-round access to Wabasca about 145 km south. There is electrical power from a local power plant and a local water purification plant where water is transported by vehicle to each home. A well-equipped, modern two-room school with gym together with a community hall acts as a hub for community activities.

== See also ==
- List of communities in Alberta
- List of designated places in Alberta
