= Wabasca, Alberta =

Wabasca Wabasca-Desmarais
- Hamlet
- Location within M.D. of Opportunity Location within Alberta Location within Canada Location within North America
- Coordinates: 55°58′N 113°51′W
- Country: Canada
- Province: Alberta
- Region: Northern Alberta
- Municipal district: Opportunity No. 17

Area (2021)
  - Land: 101.55 km^{2} (39.21 sq mi)
- Elevation: 550 m (1,800 ft)

Population (2021)
  - Total: 1,594
  - Density: 15.7/km^{2} (41/sq mi)
- Time zone: UTC−06:00 (Alberta Time)
- Postal Code: T0G 0X0
- Area code: +1-780
- Highways: Highway 813; Highway 754
- Waterways: North Wabasca Lake, Wabasca River
- Website: M.D. of Opportunity No. 17

Wabasca (/ˈwɑːbəˌskɑː/ WAH-bə-skah), also known as Wabasca-Desmarais, is a hamlet in northern Alberta, Canada within the Municipal District (MD) of Opportunity No. 17. It is located between and along the South and North Wabasca Lakes, at the intersection of Highway 813 and Highway 754. It is approximately 123 km (76 mi) northeast of Slave Lake.

Wabasca, which is the location of the MD of Opportunity No. 17's municipal office, consists of two historical communities – Wabasca and Desmarais. The hamlet has a population of 1,585 which is largely Indigenous. Another 2,157 additional residents live on five Indian reserves in the immediate surrounding area. These First Nations reserves include Wabasca 166, 166A, 166B, 166C and 166D of the Bigstone Cree Nation, and the Woodland Cree people.

The name Wabasca originates from the Cree word wâpaskâw, meaning "white grass," the name for the Wabasca River. Desmarais was named after Father Alphonse Desmarais, the first missionary in this area.

== History ==
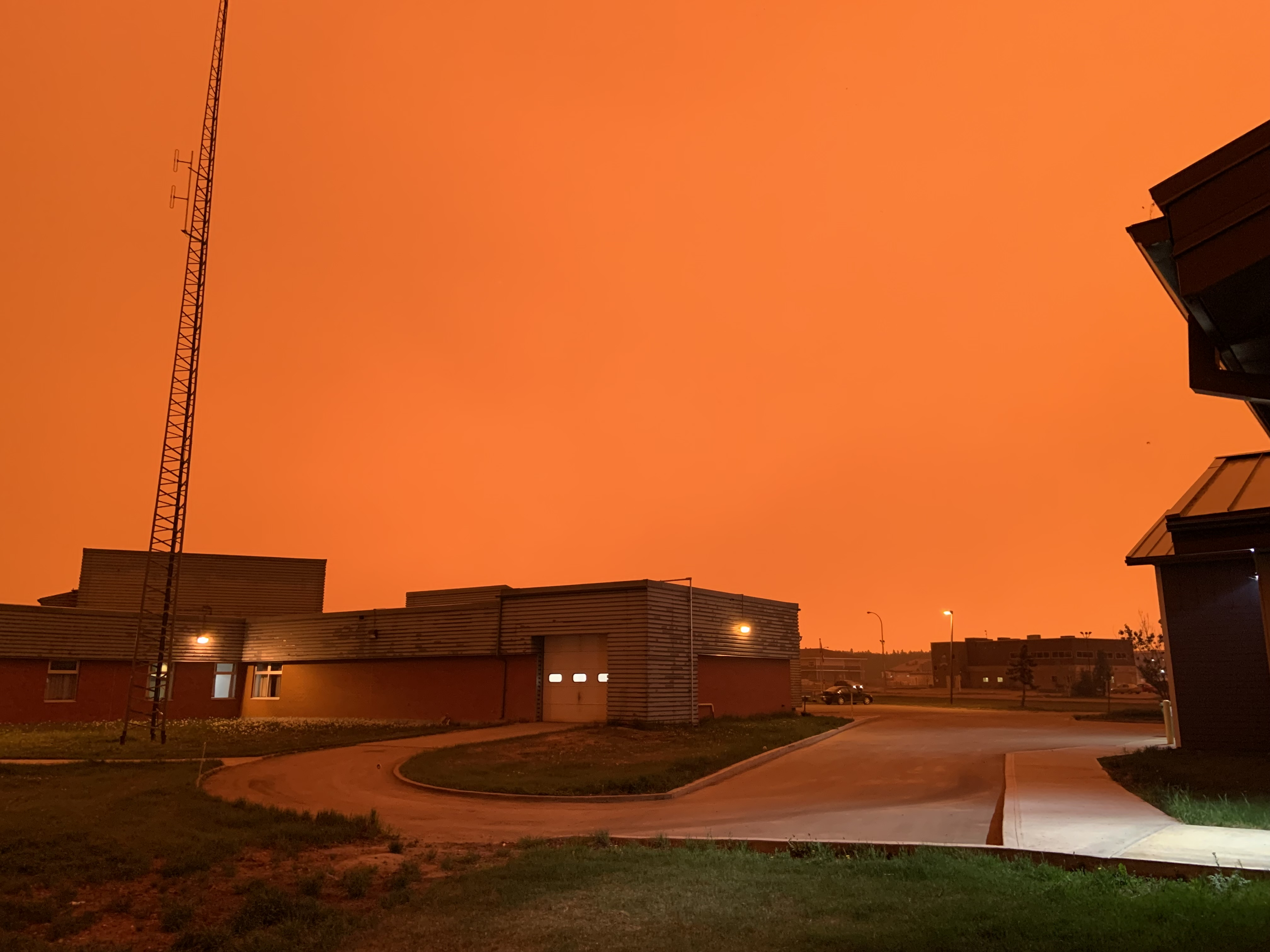
Smoke from the 2019 McMillan complex forest fire above the Wabasca Health Care Centre. This photo was taken at 5:20pm local time, 3 hours before the mandatory evacuation order.

=== Early history ===
The Hudson's Bay company opened their first trading post in the Wabasca area in the 1880s. This was followed by the St. John’s Anglican Mission in 1894 and St. Martin’s Catholic Boarding School in 1901. 1899 saw the signing of Treaty 8 and this combined with a booming fur trade attracted more settlers and indigenous to the region. The first Indian reserve in the area, Wabasca 166 was surveyed in 1913.

=== 2019 wildfire ===
In May 2019, the McMillan complex forest fire burning to the West of the hamlet was characterized as out of control. On May 29, strong easterly winds pushed smoke into the community and an overnight evacuation order was placed at 8:44 pm affecting 3,300 people. The fire, suspected of being caused by arson, would go on to burn 273,000 ha (670,000 acres) of forest in the MD of Opportunity No. 17, and kept residents from returning to their homes until June 11, 2019. The fire came as close as 4.5 km (2.8 mi) to the Bigstone Cree Nation communities on the western shore of the lakes.

== Geography ==
Wabasca is located in the Boreal Plains of Northern Alberta, part of the largest intact forest on earth. Two large lakes border the town along the west, North Wabasca Lake and South Wabasca Lake. The Wabasca River runs along downtown and connects the two lakes before continuing to the Peace River as part of the Mackenzie River watershed.

Wabasca's hamlet boundary includes three census geographic units – the Wabasca and Desmarais designated places and the Desmarais Indian settlement – as well as additional lands.

=== Climate ===
Wabasca has a subarctic climate (Köppen climate classification Dfc).

Climate data for Wabasca
Month	Jan	Feb	Mar	Apr	May	Jun	Jul	Aug	Sep	Oct	Nov	Dec	Year
Record high °C (°F)	14.5 (58.1)	14.0 (57.2)	17.2 (63.0)	28.5 (83.3)	32.0 (89.6)	33.0 (91.4)	33.0 (91.4)	32.5 (90.5)	31.0 (87.8)	26.0 (78.8)	15.0 (59.0)	10.0 (50.0)	33.0 (91.4)
Mean daily maximum °C (°F)	−9.5 (14.9)	−5.0 (23.0)	1.6 (34.9)	9.7 (49.5)	16.2 (61.2)	20.5 (68.9)	22.8 (73.0)	21.8 (71.2)	15.8 (60.4)	8.3 (46.9)	−3.0 (26.6)	−7.3 (18.9)	7.7 (45.9)
Daily mean °C (°F)	−15.3 (4.5)	−12.1 (10.2)	−5.2 (22.6)	3.3 (37.9)	9.7 (49.5)	14.3 (57.7)	16.9 (62.4)	15.6 (60.1)	9.9 (49.8)	3.3 (37.9)	−7.7 (18.1)	−12.5 (9.5)	1.7 (35.1)
Mean daily minimum °C (°F)	−21.1 (−6.0)	−19.0 (−2.2)	−11.8 (10.8)	−3.0 (26.6)	3.1 (37.6)	8.2 (46.8)	11.0 (51.8)	9.4 (48.9)	3.9 (39.0)	−1.8 (28.8)	−12.3 (9.9)	−17.6 (0.3)	−4.3 (24.3)
Record low °C (°F)	−51.0 (−59.8)	−49.0 (−56.2)	−42.2 (−44.0)	−35.0 (−31.0)	−18.9 (−2.0)	−1.1 (30.0)	−1.1 (30.0)	−4.5 (23.9)	−13.3 (8.1)	−26.0 (−14.8)	−36.5 (−33.7)	−43.5 (−46.3)	−51.0 (−59.8)
Average precipitation mm (inches)	22.2 (0.87)	17.7 (0.70)	15.8 (0.62)	22.7 (0.89)	46.9 (1.85)	74.0 (2.91)	96.3 (3.79)	61.1 (2.41)	38.8 (1.53)	25.3 (1.00)	20.2 (0.80)	21.1 (0.83)	462.1 (18.19)
Average rainfall mm (inches)	0.5 (0.02)	0.6 (0.02)	1.7 (0.07)	12.7 (0.50)	44.5 (1.75)	74.0 (2.91)	96.3 (3.79)	61.1 (2.41)	38.7 (1.52)	16.1 (0.63)	1.7 (0.07)	0.5 (0.02)	348.4 (13.72)
Average snowfall mm (inches)	22.8 (0.90)	18.0 (0.71)	14.8 (0.58)	10.0 (0.39)	2.5 (0.10)	0.0 (0.0)	0.0 (0.0)	0.0 (0.0)	0.1 (0.00)	8.7 (0.34)	19.3 (0.76)	21.2 (0.83)	117.2 (4.61)
Average precipitation days (≥ 0.2 mm)	8.6	6.7	5.6	7.1	10.9	13.0	15.2	12.4	11.2	9.0	8.6	8.1	116.4
Average rainy days (≥ 0.2 mm)	0.23	0.18	0.68	5.0	10.7	13.0	15.2	12.4	11.2	7.1	0.57	0.09	76.2
Average snowy days (≥ 0.2 cm)	8.6	6.4	5.1	2.7	0.58	0.0	0.0	0.0	0.08	2.5	8.1	8.1	42.0
Source: Environment Canada

== Demographics ==
Population history of Desmarais
Year	Pop.	±%
1941		—
1951	105	—
1956	103	−1.9%
1961	303	+194.2%
1966	108	−64.4%
1971	258	+138.9%
1976	149	−42.2%
1981	260	+74.5%
1986	230	−11.5%
1991	218	−5.2%
1996	122	−44.0%
2001	108	−11.5%
2006	82	−24.1%
2011	138	+68.3%
2016	74	−46.4%
Source: Statistics Canada

Population history of Wabasca
Year	Pop.	±%
1941	355	—
1951	253	−28.7%
1956	459	+81.4%
1961	381	−17.0%
1966	587	+54.1%
1971	172	−70.7%
1976	528	+207.0%
1981	701	+32.8%
1986	851	+21.4%
1991	858	+0.8%
1991A	842	−1.9%
1996	1,028	+22.1%
2001	1,114	+8.4%
2006	1,156	+3.8%
2011	1,302	+12.6%
2016	1,406	+8.0%
2016R	1,480	+5.3%
2021	1,594	+7.7%
Source: Statistics Canada

In the 2021 Census of Population conducted by Statistics Canada, Wabasca-Desmarais had a population of 1,594 living in 522 of its 619 total private dwellings, a change of 7.7% from its 2016 population of 1,480. With a land area of 101.55 km^{2} (39.21 sq mi), it had a population density of 15.7/km^{2} (40.7/sq mi) in 2021.

As a designated place in the 2016 Census of Population conducted by Statistics Canada, by combining the Wabasca and Desmarais designated places and the Desmarais Indian settlement, the Hamlet of Wabasca had a population of 1,585 living in 527 of its 677 total private dwellings, a change of 1% from its 2011 population of 1,569. With a land area of 28.44 km^{2} (10.98 sq mi), it had a population density of 55.7/km^{2} (144.3/sq mi) in 2016.

Name	Census geographic unit	Population (2016)	Population (2011)	Per cent change	Occupied dwellings	Private dwellings	Land area (km²)	Population density
Desmarais	Designated place	74	138	-46.4%	30	41	5.61	13.2
Desmarais	Indian settlement	105	129	-18.6%	51	91	1.45	72.4
Wabasca	Designated place	1,406	1,302	8%	446	545	21.38	65.8
Total Hamlet of Wabasca		1,585	1,569	1.0%	527	677	28.44	55.7
Wabasca 166	Indian reserve	160	152	5.3%	42	49	84.96	1.9
Wabasca 166A	Indian reserve	658	738	-10.8%	183	213	6.33	103.9
Wabasca 166B	Indian reserve	190	250	-24%	43	52	25.52	7.4
Wabasca 166C	Indian reserve	188	182	3.3%	47	58	35.24	5.3
Wabasca 166D	Indian reserve	961	885	8.6%	248	273	58.8	16.3
Total Indian reserves		2,157	2,207	-2.3%	563	645	210.85	10.2
Total Wabasca community		3,742	3,776	−0.9%	1,090	1,322	239.29	15.6

== Economy ==
Located west of the Wabasca oil field, oil and gas exploration and extraction is Wabasca's primary industry. Forestry also plays a role in the local economy with Alberta Pacific Forest Industries operating an office out of the community. The community is also within vicinity of the Wabasca oil sands, the fourth largest deposit of oil sands in Alberta.

== Government ==
=== Municipal government ===
Wabasca does not have a local council and is instead represented by three councillors on the MD of Opportunity No. 17 Council. Other communities represented by the council include Calling Lake, Red Earth Creek, and Chipewyan Lake. As of 2026, the councillors representing the Wabasca ward are Marcel C. Auger, Robin Guild, and Darlene Jackson. The council also includes of Reeve Marshall (Marcel) D. Auger, and Deputy Reeve Brandon Powell. .

=== Provincial government ===
The hamlet lies within the Lesser Slave Lake electoral district. Scott Sinclair, elected as a United Conservative candidate in 2023, now sits as an independent MLA.

=== Federal government ===
At the federal level, Wabasca is represented within the Fort McMurray - Cold Lake federal electoral district. This district represents a large portion of northeast Alberta, totalling more than 147,000 km^{2} (57,000 mi^{2}). In the 2019 Canadian federal election, Wabasca cast 302 votes, 146 of which went for David Yurdiga, the current incumbent.

=== Crime ===
Wabasca is the location of the Desmarais Detachment of the Royal Canadian Mounted Police (RCMP), Canada's national police service. This detachment serves a large remote area including most of the MD of Opportunity No. 17. In September 2019, the RCMP moved to a new building located on Airport Road in the industrial area of the hamlet. In 2019, the Desmarais Detachment reported a crime severity index of 339.46. This is higher than the 128.91 reported in Edmonton, the closest major city to Wabasca. Located downtown, the Wabasca/Desmarais Provincial Court of Alberta is a circuit court that sits on Thursdays each week.

== Arts and culture ==
The Wabasca Public Library is located in the Lakeview Centre. Opened in October 2003, the library is a member of the Peace Library System which joins 39 communities across northern Alberta in a single library network.

Wabasca hosts numerous events on an annual basis including the RCMP Fish Derby, the Wabasca Road Race, and the Lions Club Ski-Doo Rally among others.

Wabasca has four churches including St. Charles Catholic Church, St. John's Anglican Church, St. Martin's Catholic Church, and the Wabasca Revival Centre.

== Infrastructure ==
=== Transportation ===
==== Roads and highways ====
Geography has played a key role in the layout of streets and roads in Wabasca. The community is spread along the shores of the lakes following a North-South corridor. Mistassiny Road is the main connector running from Bigstone Cree Nation 166A and downtown in the south, to the predominantly residential areas in the north. Streets are named after local families, native flora and fauna, and other such practical names with no numbered system currently in use. There is also no grid system in place and the streets naturally follow the shape of the lake and avoid muskeg in the area. The Hamlet of Wabasca is accessed by Highway 813 from the southeast and Highway 754 from the southwest. Chipewyan Lake Road, also known as the ALPAC Road, is an unpaved industrial road heading north of Wabasca destined for the community of Chipewyan Lake.

==== Airports ====
The Wabasca Airport is located in the industrial area of Wabasca, north of downtown and east of North Wabasca Lake along Mistassiny Road and Airport Road. The airport serves as a gateway to the Wabasca oil sands as well as private flights and medical air transport for the region. Currently there are no scheduled services operating to the airport. The runway is 3,544 ft (1,080 m) long, 75 ft (23 m) wide, and maintained and operated 24 hours a day, 365 days a year.

==== Public transit ====
Bigstone Health Commission operates a shuttle service between Wabasca, Slave Lake and Edmonton. The shuttle runs daily during the week and offers a single departure on Sunday.

=== Health care ===
Located in downtown Wabasca, the Wabasca/Desmarais Health Care Centre offers 24-hour emergency services, ambulatory and general medicine, laboratory services, x-ray, advanced life support ambulance service, and Indigenous health services. Also located downtown, the Golden Opportunity Medical Clinic offers primary care services. In August 2022, Wosler Diagnostics opened an ultrasound clinic located within the Golden Opportunity Medical Clinic and provides a wide range of diagnostic services to patients in the region.

The Keekenow Senior Facility opened on June 15, 2020. The assisted living facility features 60 beds in a two-storey building and was completed at a cost of $16m.

== Sports and recreation ==
The community is home to a recreation centre that includes a pool, jacuzzi, steam room and fitness centre. In February 2013, the Lakeview Sports Centre opened providing the community with an indoor field house complete with gymnasium, running track, stage, and concessions.

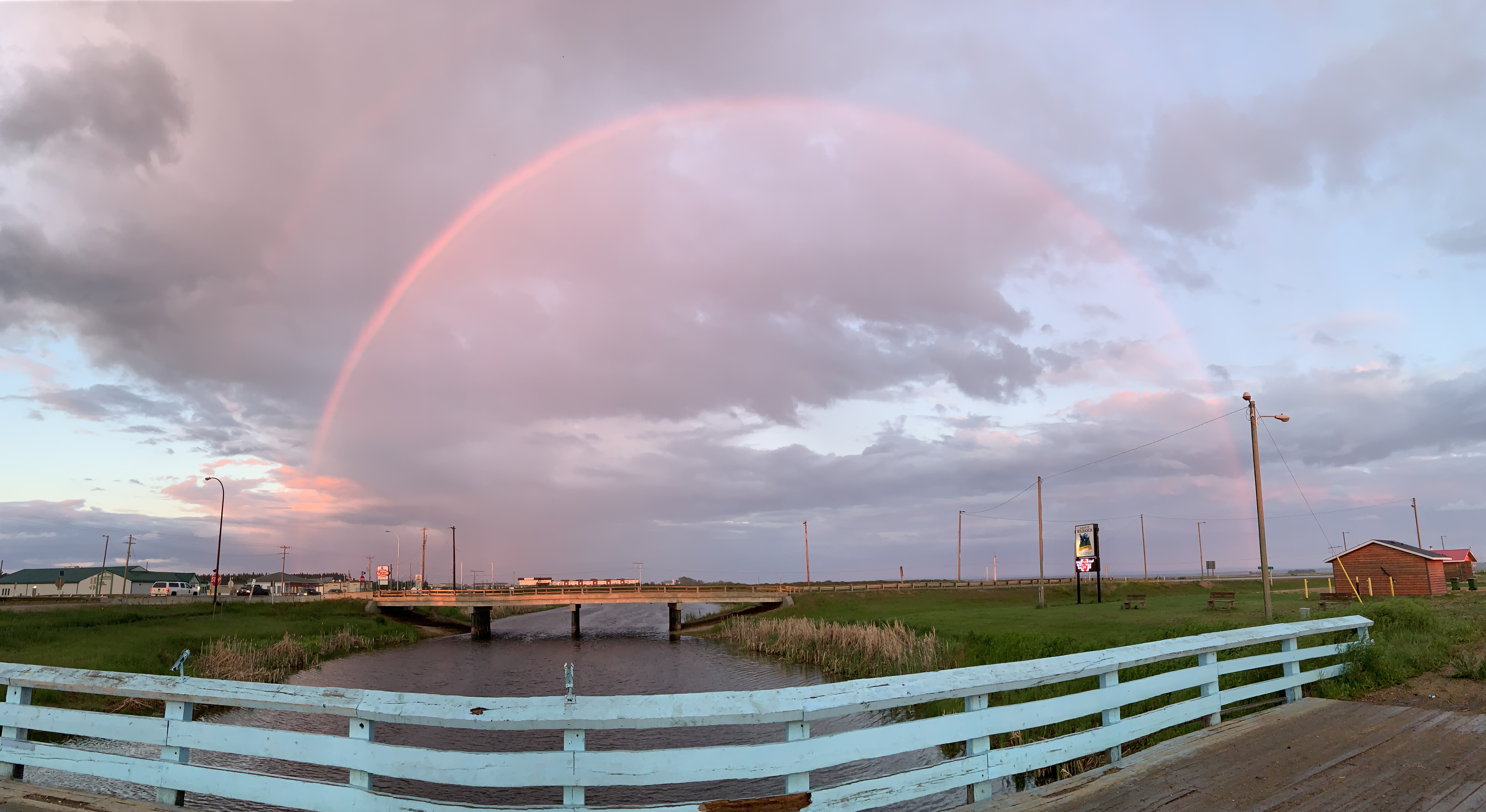
The Blue Fishing Bridge at Sam G's Park in downtown Wabasca.

Wabasca also has an ice arena, Marian Wolitiski Arena. The rink contains a single sheet of ice and concessions.

The George Stoll Recreation Grounds feature baseball diamonds, batting cage, basketball courts, skateboard park, playground, and winter outdoor ice rinks.

In downtown Wabasca, Sam G's Park is a central gathering place anchored around the Blue Fishing Bridge. Spanning the Wabasca River, the bridge offers summer fishing. The park also contains several picnic areas and a mini-golf course. The Wabasca visitor information centre can also be found in Sam G's Park seasonally, from May to October each year.

Eli Cardinal Park, formerly Fisherman’s Wharf, is an outdoor park located in the north end of the hamlet. A concrete ramp provides boat access to North Wabasca Lake in the summer and access to the ice for ice fishing in the winter.

=== Outdoor recreation ===
Wabasca features opportunities for hunting and trapping year round. Common big game species in the area include white-tailed deer, black bear, elk and moose. Many game birds are found in the forest around the hamlet, including spruce grouse, ruffed grouse, and sharp-tailed grouse. Fishing yields species such as walleye, northern pike, yellow perch, and burbot.

Eagle Point Golf Course is a 18 hole course that opened in 2013. Situated along North Wabasca Lake and surrounded by boreal forest, the course also features a driving range, practice green, and pro shop. It also has a clubhouse that features a full-service restaurant.

The Wabasca Lions Campground contains 35 camping sites along the shores of North Wabasca Lake. A public sandy beach and boat launch are also located on site.

There are many multi-use trails surrounding and running through Wabasca. Common users of these trails include ATVs, snowmobiles, cross country skiers, hikers, and mountain bikers. There is a 20 km (12 mi) paved path running along the eastern edge of North Wabasca Lake between Wabasca and Desmarais.

== Education ==
The Northland School Division operates three schools in the community – St. Theresa School for students in kindergarten through grade 6, Mistassiniy School for students in grades 7 through 12, and an outreach school for junior and senior high students.

The Bigstone Cree First Nation Education Authority operates the Bigstone Community School or Oski Pasikoniwew Kamik (OPK), which offers K-6. As of 2024, the nation now operates Golden Eagle High School, or Osaw Kihew Kiskinwahamatowikamik (OKK), which offers Grades 7-12.

A campus of Northern Lakes College is located in Wabasca. The college provides part-time and full-time programming for adult upgrading, apprenticeships, university studies, workforce development, and other careers.

== See also ==
- List of communities in Alberta
- List of designated places in Alberta
- List of hamlets in Alberta
