= Municipal District of Opportunity No. 17 =

Municipal district in Alberta, Canada

- Municipal district
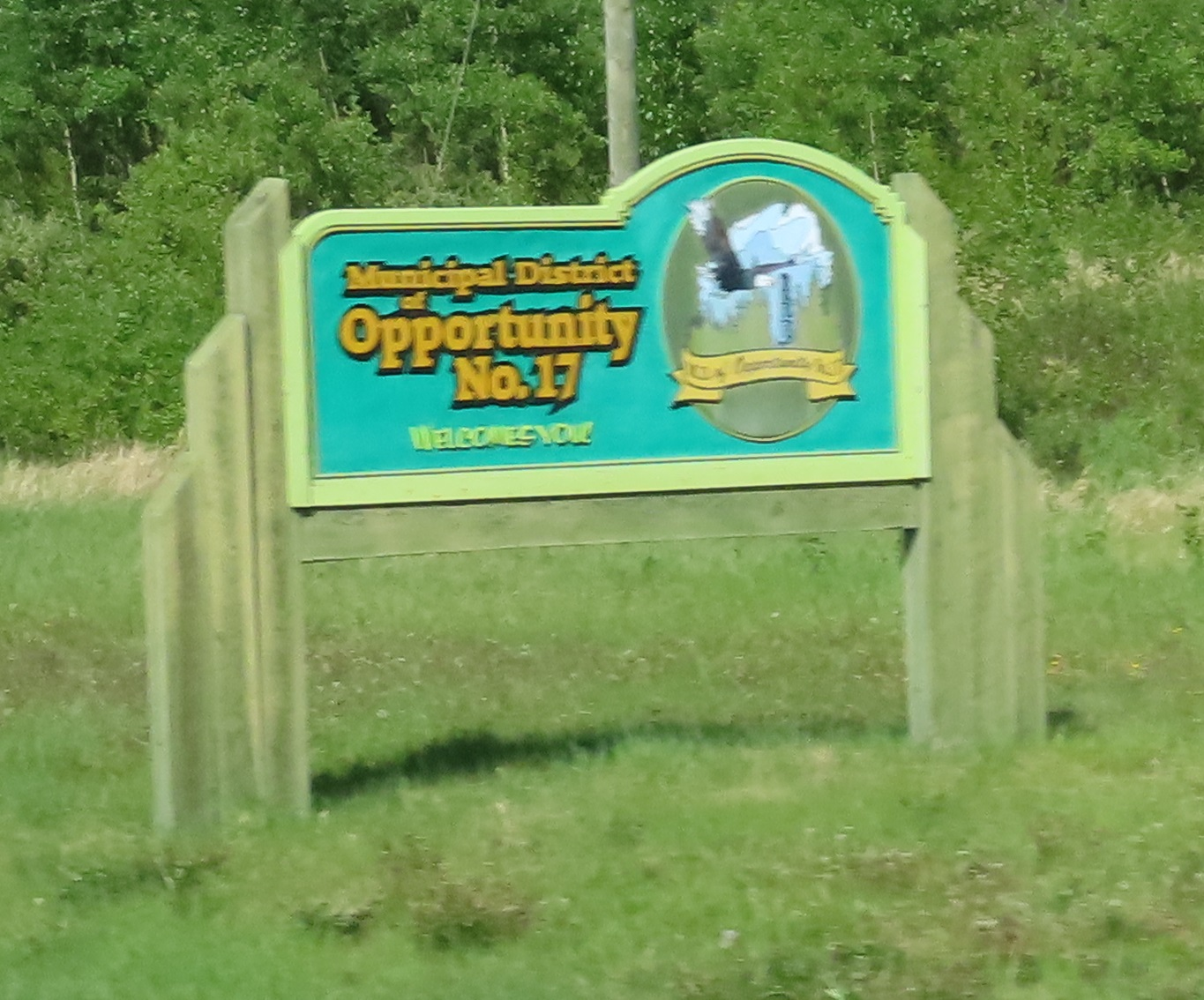
- Welcome sign

- Location within Alberta
- Country: Canada
- Province: Alberta
- Region: Northern Alberta
- Census division: 17
- Established: 1995
- Incorporated: 1995

Government
  - Reeve: Marcel Auger
  - Governing body: MD of Opportunity Council
  - Administrative office: Wabasca

Area (2021)
  - Land: 28,857.88 km^{2} (11,142.09 sq mi)

Population (2021)
  - Total: 3,382
  - Density: 0.1/km^{2} (0.26/sq mi)
  - Municipal census (2016): 2,639
- Time zone: UTC−06:00 (Alberta Time)
- Website: mdopportunity.ab.ca

The Municipal District of Opportunity No. 17 is a municipal district (MD) occupying a remote area in central northern Alberta, Canada. Located in Census Division 17 north of the Town of Athabasca, its municipal office is located in the Hamlet of Wabasca.

== History ==
The MD of Opportunity No. 17 was established on August 1, 1995 from the former Improvement District No. 17 East (North).

== Geography ==
=== Communities and localities ===
==== Hamlets ====
The following hamlets are located within the MD of Opportunity No. 17.

- Calling Lake
- Red Earth Creek
- Sandy Lake or Pelican Mountain (designated place)
- Wabasca (also known as Wabasca-Desmarais, location of municipal office)

==== Localities ====
The following localities are located within the MD of Opportunity No. 17.

- Calling River
- Centre Calling Lake
- Chipewyan Lake
- Desmarais
- North Calling Lake
- Peerless Lake
- South Calling Lake
- Trout Lake

== Demographics ==
Federal census population history
Year	Pop.	±%
1996	3,060	—
2001	3,436	+12.3%
2006	2,847	−17.1%
2011	3,074	+8.0%
2016	3,181	+3.5%
Source: Statistics Canada

In the 2021 Census of Population conducted by Statistics Canada, the MD of Opportunity No. 17 had a population of 3,382 living in 1,079 of its 1,524 total private dwellings, a change of 4% from its 2016 population of 3,253. With a land area of 28,857.88 km^{2} (11,142.09 sq mi), it had a population density of 0.1/km^{2} (0.3/sq mi) in 2021.

In the 2016 Census of Population conducted by Statistics Canada, the MD of Opportunity No. 17 had a population of 3,181 living in 1,002 of its 1,554 total private dwellings, a 3.5% change from its 2011 population of 3,074. With a land area of 29,142.1 km^{2} (11,251.8 sq mi), it had a population density of 0.1/km^{2} (0.3/sq mi) in 2016. The population of the MD is 69.4% First Nations and 10.1% Métis, making it the only predominantly Indigenous MD in Alberta.

The population of the MD of Opportunity No. 17 according to its 2016 municipal census is 2,639, a −17.9% change from its 2015 municipal census population of 3,214.

== Economy ==
The economy of the MD of Opportunity No. 17 includes oil and gas production, forestry, as well as diamond exploration. The municipality also offers the lowest residential tax rate in the Province of Alberta as part of its efforts to attract and retain residents. Tourism is also a growing segment of the economy in the M.D. Calling Lake Provincial Park in the south, along with North Wabasca Lake provide numerous opportunities for outdoor recreation year round.

== See also ==
- List of communities in Alberta
- List of municipal districts in Alberta
