= Waterhole, Alberta =

Waterhole
- Unincorporated locality
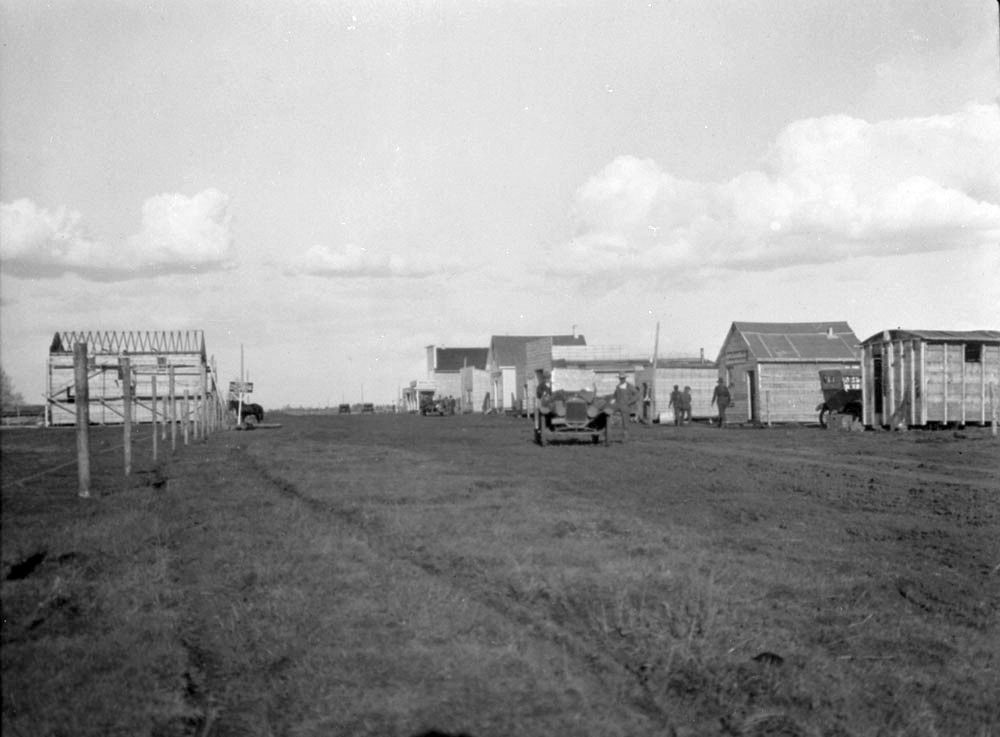
- Waterhole, 1920

- Location within Alberta Location within Canada
- Coordinates: 56°0′46″N 118°24′54″W
- Country: Canada
- Province: Alberta
- Municipal district: Fairview No. 136
- Time zone: UTC−06:00 (Alberta Time)
- GNBC Code: IAOZM

Waterhole is an unincorporated locality in the Municipal District of Fairview No. 136, Alberta, Canada. Now a ghost town, Waterhole prospered during the early 1900s.

== History ==
The location was known in the late 1800s as "The Waterhole", because potable water from Boucher Creek could be found in a waterhole located there. The first settler arrived in 1908, and a post office was established in 1912. In 1914, a general store opened. That same year, an annual agricultural fair was started, and Waterhole had over 50 residents. In 1916, a community hall was built, and by 1926, Waterhole had a doctor's office, a livery barn, a black smith, a hardware store, a bank, a telegraph office, electrical generator, and telephone service. The Empire Hotel in Waterhole was owned by three Chinese immigrants. Waterhole was "the focal point for a wide range of commercial and social activity" between Peace River and Dunvegan.

=== Decline ===
When the Edmonton, Dunvegan and British Columbia Railway was built through the area in 1928, it bypassed Waterhole, and was constructed through Fairview, located 6 kilometres (3.7 mi) north of Waterhole. To benefit from the economic prosperity associated with being near a railroad, most of the families and businesses in Waterhole moved to Fairview, where Waterhole residents were given first choice of surveyed lots for sale. Some Waterhole buildings were transported to Fairview, while others were dismantled and then rebuilt there.

When the Canada Central put up a station at the end of steel in 1928, most of the 200 or so people of Waterhole packed up and moved to the new instant railway village of Fairview, many of them moving their houses and business offices, as well.

Fairview prospered as a regional centre to the surrounding agricultural area.

The post office in Waterhole closed in 1932, and Waterhole was abandoned. Few structures remained in Waterhole, and much of the former townsite was plowed over and used for agriculture. The Waterhole Cemetery continues to operate.

In 1990, an archaeological investigations was conducted at Waterhole.

== Notable people ==
- Donald MacBeth Kennedy, Member of Parliament.
