= Fairview Ski Hill =

Coordinates: 55°59′44″N 118°36′20″W

- Interactive map of Fairview Ski Hill
- Location: Fairview No. 136, Alberta, Canada
- Nearest city: About 15 minutes from Fairview, Alberta
- Vertical: 500 feet (150 m)
- Skiable area: 20,000 feet (6,100 m)
- Trails: 15
- Lift system: 4 Lifts: 1 rope tow, 2 platters & 1 T-bar
- Terrain parks: 1
- Snowmaking: Yes
- Night skiing: Yes
- Website: Ski Fairview

The Fairview Ski Hill is a ski area located about 15 km southwest of the Town of Fairview, Alberta, Canada. It has a rope tow, 2 platters and one T-bar and 15 runs. They offer 20,000 feet (6,100 m) of groomed runs on 100% natural snow. There is skiing and snowboarding for everyone, no matter ability. The Fairview Ski Hill has lessons available for beginners, a terrain park for the snowboarders and many special events throughout the season.

The hill was incorporated as a non-profit organization in 1970 and heavily relied on volunteer and community support. Volunteers continue to assist in projects and it is still run by a volunteer board.

== Facilities ==
=== Rental Shop ===
- large selection of Salomon parabolic skis
- wide range of snowboards

=== Concession ===
- variety of meals, snacks & drinks
- daily specials

== Lift system ==
Lift Name	Type
Main Tow	Platter
North Tow	Platter
T-Bar	T-Bar
Bunny Tow	Ropetow

== See also ==
- List of ski areas and resorts in Canada
