= Friedenstal, Alberta =

Friedenstal
- Settlement
- Location within M.D. of Fairview Location within Alberta
- Coordinates: 56°02′41.8″N 118°20′11.4″W
- Country: Canada
- Province: Alberta
- Region: Northern Alberta
- Municipal district: Fairview No. 136
- Founded: 1910

Friedenstal (free-DEN-stall) is a locality in Alberta, Canada. It is located 4 kilometers southeast of Fairview in Municipal District of Fairview No. 136 in the Peace Region of northwestern Alberta.

== Founding ==
Friedenstal was founded in 1910 by Peter Gans and Lewis Flath just before the First World War. Gans would soon send reports to German Newspapers urging Bessarabian settlers in Ukraine, Russian Empire and United States (Several Bessarabian German Families settled in Hays, Kansas and Ellis County, Kansas). On August 9, 1911 Archbishop Célestin-Henri Joussard O.M.I visited the settlement bringing with him German speaking Rev. A Biehler O.M.I. Father Biehler would return in October of the same year with plans to build a small log chapel and rectory the settlement was populated by immigrant settlers of German origin who had previously settled in Ukraine (Bessarabian Germans). The settlement was officially founded sometime between 1911 and 1914, the consensus today is that the settlement was officially founded in 1912.

== Naming ==
The locality was originally named Westphalia after the Westphalia region in Germany. The locality was renamed St. Louis in October 1911, however the name was yet again changed in 1914 after the desire to build a post-office was put forward, due to the names Westphilia and St. Louis regulated to history, the name was changed to Friedenstal. The name Fridenstal was chosen after the Bessarabia German settlement of the same name in present-day south west Ukraine between Odessa and the Republic of Moldova meaning "Peace Valley"

== Church, Hall, and School ==
=== St. Boniface Church ===
In 1911 Rev. A Biehler O.M.I founded a small chapel in Friedenstal. In 1921 Father William Ebert built St. Boniface Church in Friedenstal, the parish was made up of the settlers around Friedenstal. St. Boniface closed a few years after the Friedenstal School and St. Theresa Dormitory, those who attended mass at St. Boniface began to go to St. Thomas More Catholic Church in Fairview. Over the years since its building the church has been maintained as a historical site. Many deceased settlers and residents of whom can be found in the small cemetery located behind the St. Boniface..

=== Friedenstal Hall ===
When the new church was built in 1921, a Hall known as the Friedenstal Hall was built as well, the Hall served as an events center for weddings and family reunions in Friedenstal. Following a controlled burn of the old hall a new Friedenstal community Hall was constructed in 2010 costing over one million dollars raised by the Friedenstal historical society.

=== Friedenstal School District ===
With the building of the chapel and rectory in Friedenstal, also came the building of a small public school in 1914. In 1937 the Sisters of Providence had begun teaching at the small school. In 1946 it was decided to build a new school house in Fridenstal, it was also decided to build a dormitory called St. Theresa Residence in Friedenstal, the St. Theresa Residence was Built for students attending the school from other communities and operated by the Sisters of Providence. The school closed several years after the closure of the Dormitory, students who attended the Friedenstal School would be sent to St. Thomas More Catholic School in Fairview.
