= Dunvegan, Alberta =

Dunvegan
- unincorporated community
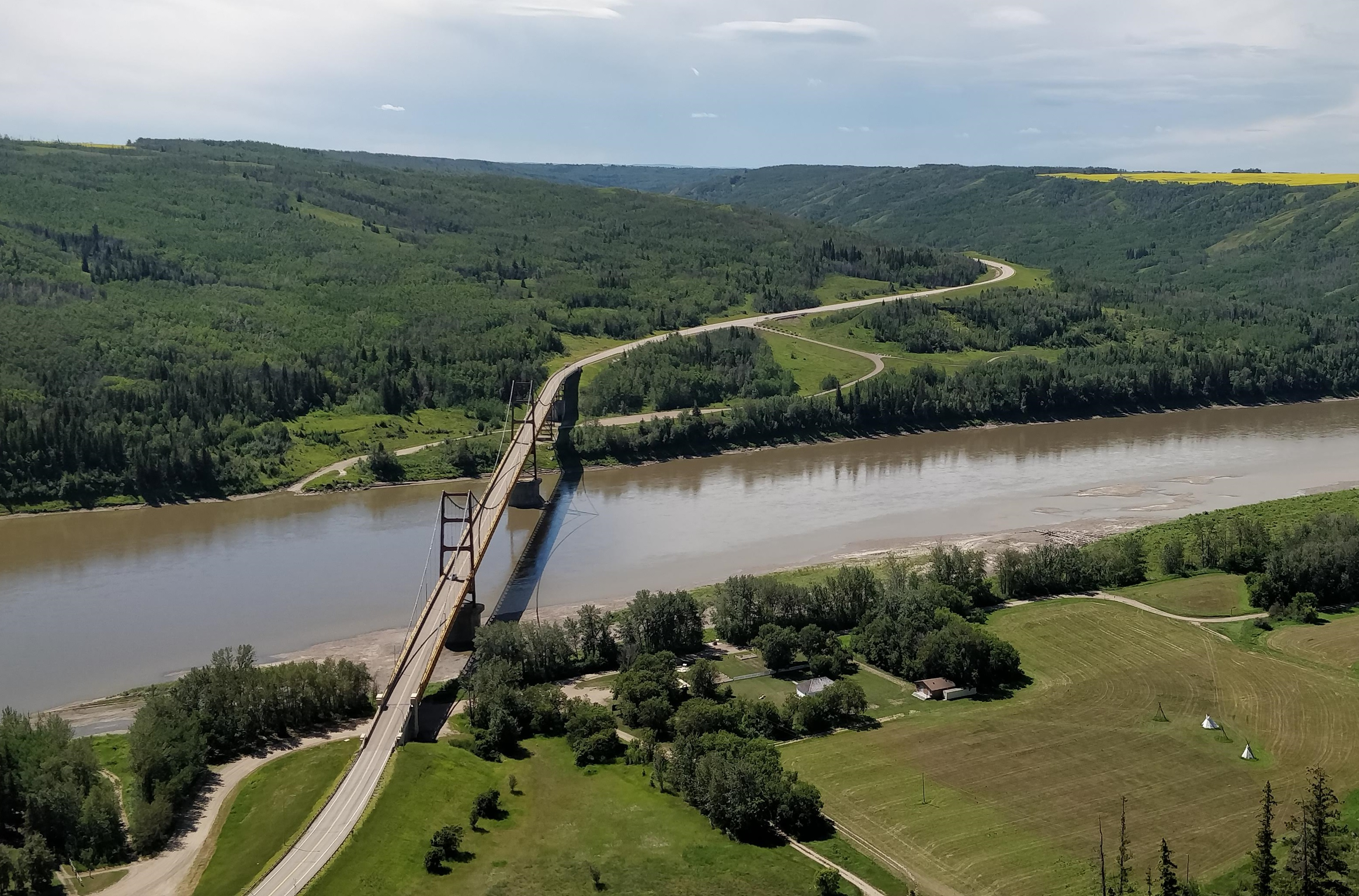
- Dunvegan Bridge

- Location of Dunvegan in M.D. of Fairview Dunvegan (Alberta)
- Coordinates: 55°55′16″N 118°36′09″W
- Country: Canada
- Province: Alberta
- Census division: No. 19
- Municipal district: Municipal District of Fairview No. 136

Government
  - Type: Unincorporated

Population
  - Total: 150
- Time zone: UTC−7 (MST)
  - Summer (DST): UTC−6 (MDT)

Dunvegan (/dʌnˈveɪɡən/ dun-VAY-gən) is an unincorporated community within the Municipal District of Fairview No. 136 in northern Alberta, Canada. It is 26 kilometres (16 mi) south of the town of Fairview on the northern bank of the Peace River at the mouth of the Hines Creek.

Highway 2 crosses the Peace River at Dunvegan on Alberta's longest vehicle suspension bridge. The Dunvegan Formation was named for this community.

== History ==
The area was inhabited by the Beaver (Dunne-za) First Nation. The first European explorers arrived in the late 18th century. Fort Dunvegan was established in 1805 by North West Company fur trader Archibald Norman McLeod, who named it after Dunvegan Castle in Scotland. Today, Dunvegan Provincial Park offers tours of the restored Hudson's Bay Company Factor's House (built 1877), St. Charles Church, St. Charles Rectory, and Revillon Frères Trading Post to the public during the summer months. A campground is also onsite.

The fort is designated as a historic site by Parks Canada.
