= Dunvegan Suspension Bridge =

Suspension bridge in Dunvegan, Alberta

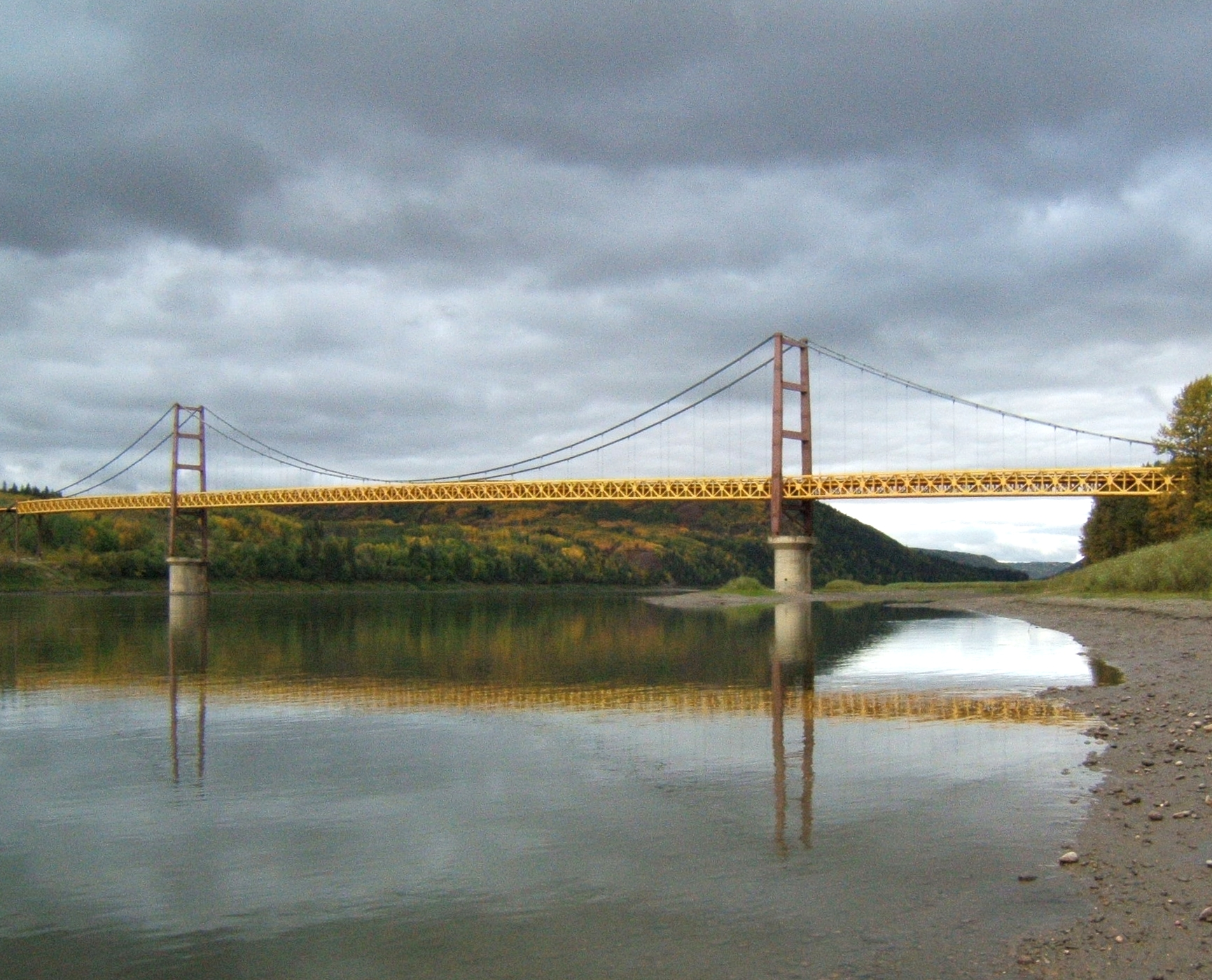
- Dunvegan suspension bridge, seen in early September
- Coordinates: 55.921034°N 118.604768°W
- Carries: Alberta Highway 2
- Crosses: Peace River
- Locale: Dunvegan, Alberta, Canada
- Other name(s): Dunvegan Bridge
- Maintained by: Alberta Transportation

Characteristics
- Design: Three-span suspension bridge
- Material: Steel
- Total length: 723.9 metres (2,375 ft)
- Width: 8.2 metres (27 ft)
- Longest span: 275.8 metres (905 ft)
- Clearance above: 10.5 metres (34 ft)

History
- Designer: V. E. Mcune
- Construction end: 1960
- Opened: 1960

Statistics
- Daily traffic: 2,620 (2024)

Dunvegan Bridge is a suspension bridge that crosses the Peace River as part of Alberta Highway 2 between the Municipal District of Fairview No. 136 and Saddle Hills County next to the unincorporated community of Dunvegan. It is approximately 87 kilometres (54 mi) from the British Columbia border with Fairview to the north and Spirit River to the south. It is the largest and longest suspension bridge in Alberta.

== Design ==
The bridge is made of 4,050 short tons (3,670 metric tons) of steel and 26 cubic yards (20 m^{3}) of concrete. The design features three spans of cable wire and two towers over two lanes of Alberta Highway 2 with a steel railing. The bridge deck has two yellow-painted steel trusses on either side of the roadway. The bridge is supported by two pillars connected to the towers on either side and two concrete abutments.

== History ==
Prior to the bridge being built, Dunvegan was served by a government installed ferry across the Peace River. The bridge itself was built and opened in 1960. After the opening, the Dunvegan Crossing ferry was moved down to La Crete and served as the Tompkins ferry (still in operation) from 1961 to 1987. This ferry can be seen at the La Crete Mennonite Heritage Village.

== See also ==
- List of bridges in Canada
