= Whitelaw, Alberta =

Whitelaw
- Hamlet
- Location of Whitelaw Whitelaw (Canada)
- Coordinates: 56°06′30″N 118°04′41″W
- Country: Canada
- Province: Alberta
- Region: Northern Alberta
- Census division: 19
- Municipal district: Municipal District of Fairview No. 136

Government
  - Type: Unincorporated
  - Governing body: Municipal District of Fairview No. 136 Council

Area (2021)
  - Land: 0.64 km^{2} (0.25 sq mi)

Population (2021)
  - Total: 110
  - Density: 171.3/km^{2} (444/sq mi)
- Time zone: UTC−06:00 (Alberta Time)
- Area codes: 780, 587, 825

Whitelaw is a hamlet in northern Alberta, Canada within the Municipal District of Fairview No. 136. It is located 2 kilometres (1.2 mi) north of Highway 2, approximately 114 kilometres (71 mi) northeast of Grande Prairie.

== Demographics ==
Population history of Whitelaw
Year	Pop.	±%
1941	36	—
1951	153	+325.0%
1956	212	+38.6%
1961	264	+24.5%
1966	204	−22.7%
1971	192	−5.9%
1976	123	−35.9%
1981	164	+33.3%
1986	139	−15.2%
1991	146	+5.0%
1996	98	−32.9%
2001	124	+26.5%
2006	136	+9.7%
2011	134	−1.5%
2016	125	−6.7%
2021	110	−12.0%
Source: Statistics Canada

In the 2021 Census of Population conducted by Statistics Canada, Whitelaw had a population of 110 living in 50 of its 60 total private dwellings, a change of −12% from its 2016 population of 125. With a land area of 0.64 km^{2} (0.25 sq mi), it had a population density of 171.9/km^{2} (445.2/sq mi) in 2021.

As a designated place in the 2016 Census of Population conducted by Statistics Canada, Whitelaw had a population of 125 living in 54 of its 61 total private dwellings, a change of −6.7% from its 2011 population of 134. With a land area of 0.64 km^{2} (0.25 sq mi), it had a population density of 195.3/km^{2} (505.9/sq mi) in 2016.

== See also ==
- List of communities in Alberta
- List of designated places in Alberta
- List of hamlets in Alberta
