= Archibald Norman McLeod =

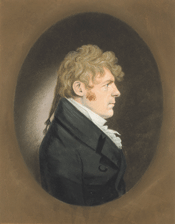
- Born: 17 March 1772; Kilfinichen, Argyll and Bute
- Died: Between 1837 and 1845; Sunnybank, Aberdeenshire

Major The Hon. Archibald Norman McLeod (17 March 1772 – after 1837) J.P., was a partner of the North West Company and a political figure in Lower Canada. In 1805, he built Fort Dunvegan. He was a member of the Beaver Club and represented Montreal West in the Legislative Assembly of Lower Canada from 1810 to 1814. He fought in the War of 1812 as a Major with the Corps of Canadian Voyageurs and the Canadian Voltigeurs. McLeod Lake, British Columbia is named for him.

Born at Kilfinichen, he was the fifth son of Rev. Neil McLeod (1729-1780) M.A., a native of St Kilda, and Margaret MacLean (1737-1789), daughter of Rev. Archibald MacLean (b.1683) M.A., of the MacLeans of Boreray, North Uist. Archibald's grandfather, John McLeod (1696-1792), 4th Laird of Pabbay and Steward of St Kilda, was directly descended from the 6th Chief of Clan MacLeod of Lewis, of Dunvegan Castle. In 1773, Samuel Johnson and James Boswell stayed as guests of Archibald's father, who Boswell described as, "a Minister that lives upon the coast, whose elegance of conversation and strength of judgment would make him conspicuous in places of greater celebrity... We were very agreeably entertained at his house. Dr. Johnson observed to me that he was the clearest headed man that he had met with in the Western Islands".

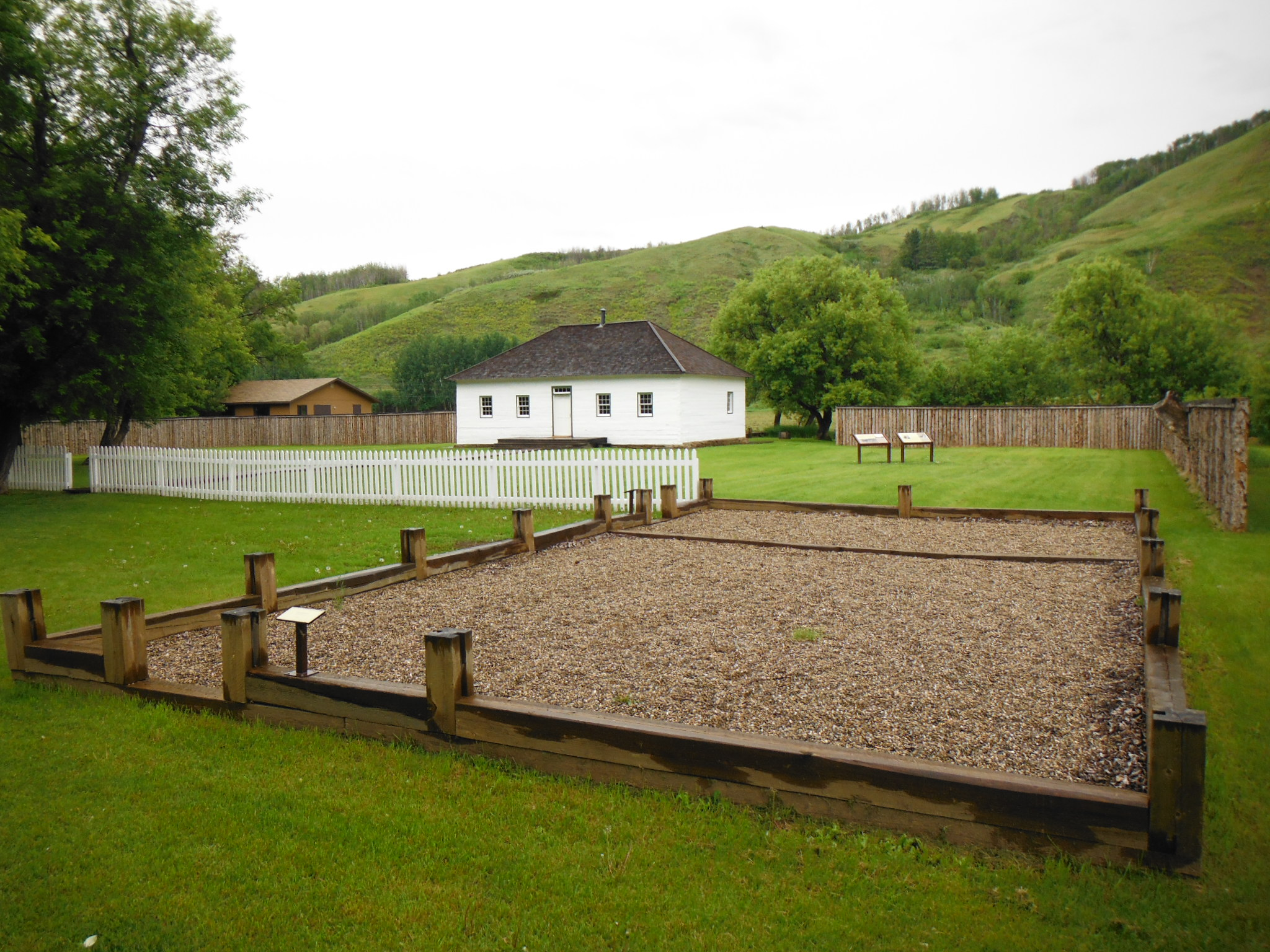
Fort Dunvegan, built by McLeod in 1805.

Archibald entered the North West Company as a clerk, probably through the interest of one of the partners, Alexander McLeod, some time before 1793, and became a partner in the NWC in 1796. He was stationed in the Lower Fort des Prairies department in 1794–5, and in 1800-1 he was in charge of the Swan River district, wintering at Fort Alexandria, where he kept a journal that survives. From 1802 to 1808, he was working in the Athabaska district. In 1805, he established Fort Dunvegan, named for his family's ancestral home, Dunvegan Castle. He retired from wintering in the wilds in 1809. He was named a justice of the peace for the Western Territories in 1809 and then for Montreal district in 1810. McLeod was an officer in the militia and served during the War of 1812. He did not run for reelection to the assembly in 1814. McLeod was one of the instigators of the Battle of Seven Oaks.

After the merger of the North West Company with the Hudson's Bay Company, he moved to Scotland, settling at Sunnybank, Aberdeenshire. During his time in the western territories, he had married a native woman. McLeod later served as master of the barracks at Belfast until around 1838. He was dead by 1845, when his widow's death is recorded.

McLeod Lake in British Columbia was named in his honour.
