= Fort Fork =

Coordinates: 56.1376°N 117.4748°W

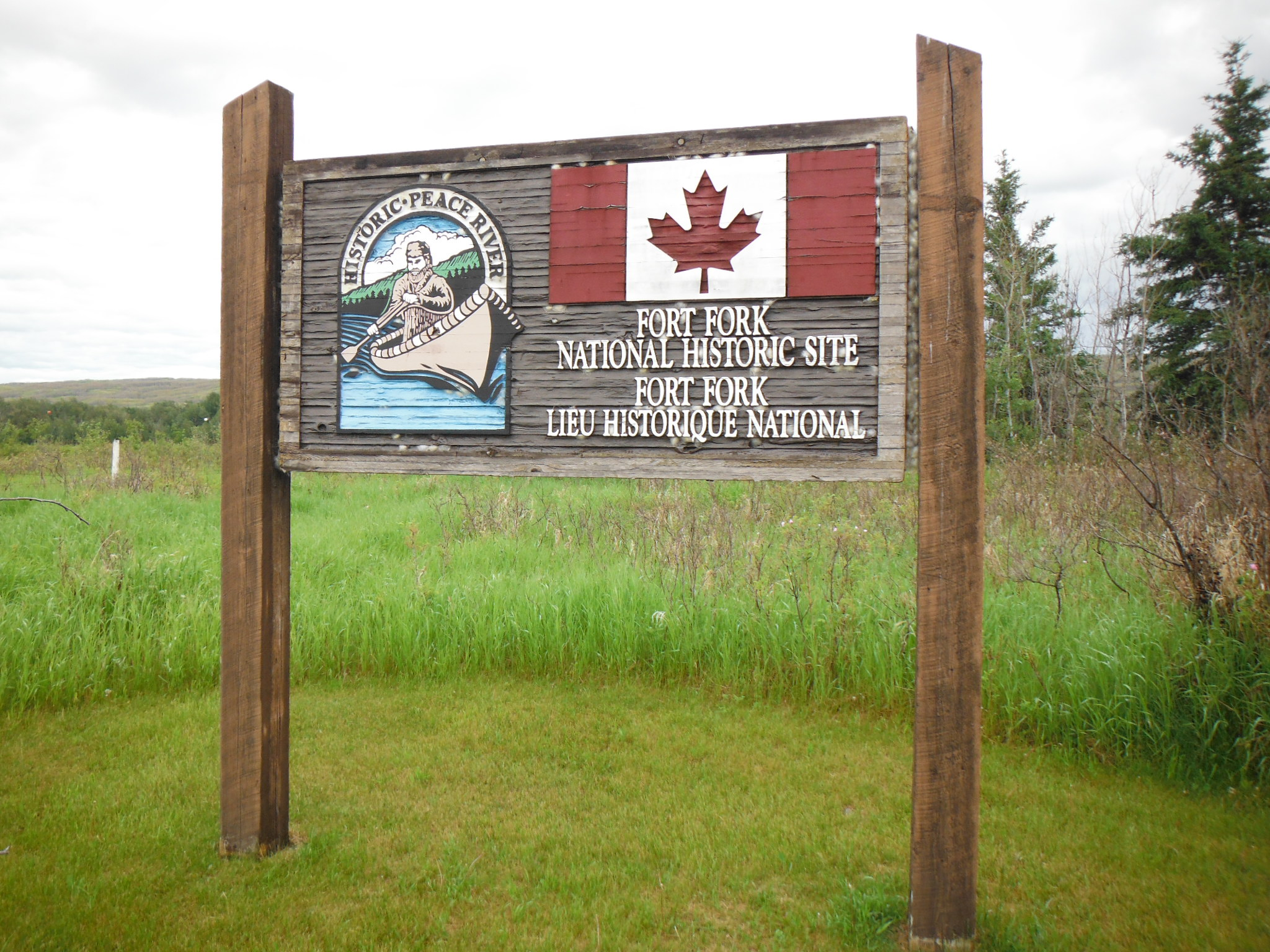
- Interactive map of Fort Fork
- Location: Alberta, Canada

History
- Established: 1792

National Historic Site of Canada

Fort Fork is the site of a North West Company (NWC) trading post on the Peace River in Alberta, Canada, established in 1792. From 1 November 1792 to 9 May 1793, Alexander Mackenzie wintered there prior to his expedition to the Pacific Ocean. The fort was used until the NWC merged with the XY Company in 1805, after which it was replaced by Fort Dunvegan, further upstream.

The fort was located southwest of the present-day town of Peace River, Alberta. No known physical remains of the fort have survived, but there is an archaeological site there marked by a semi-circular depression and a cairn. The site was declared a National Historic Site of Canada in 1928.

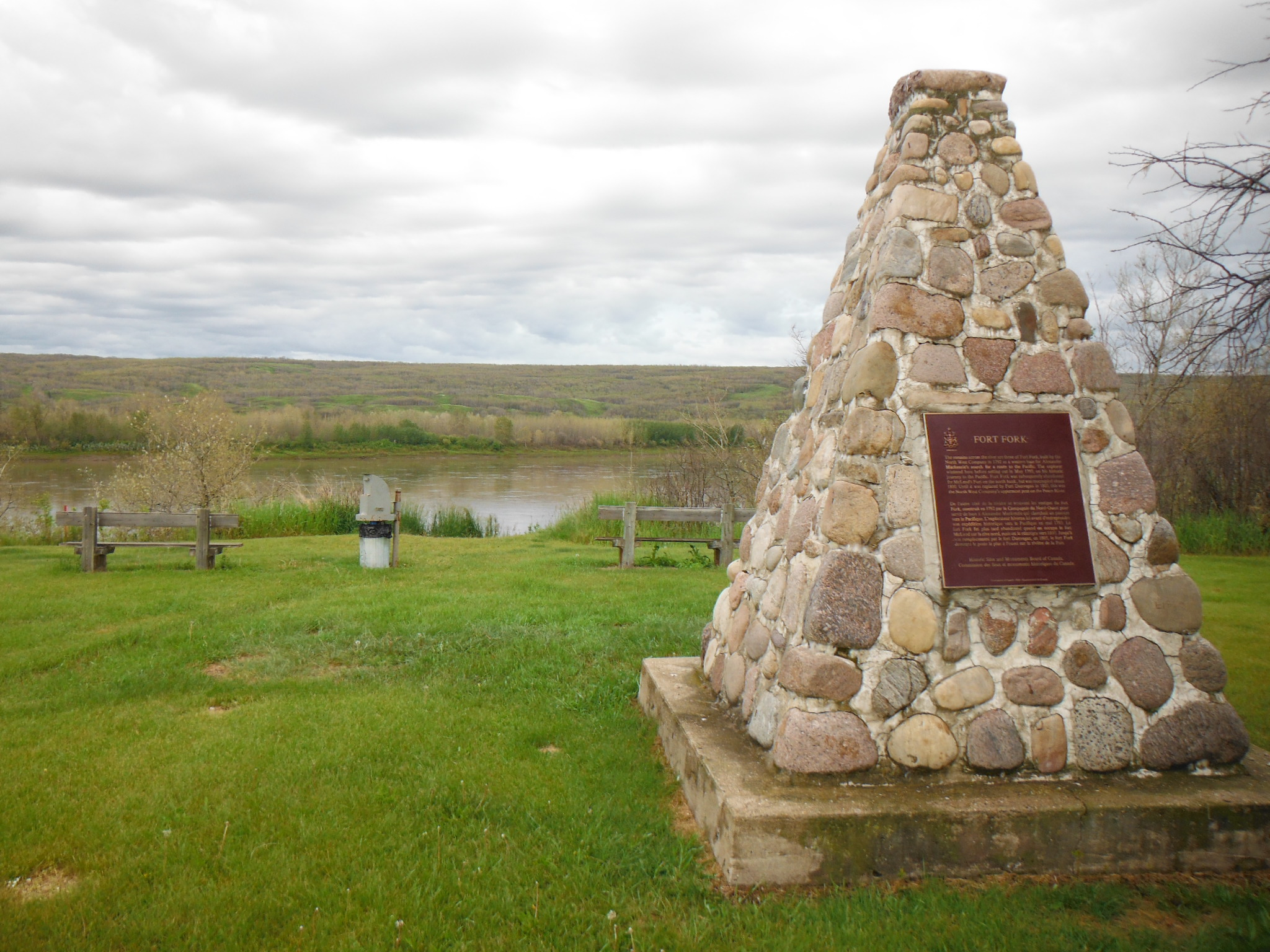
Fort Fork Cairn
