= List of listed buildings in Kilfinichen And Kilvickeon, Argyll and Bute =

This is a list of listed buildings in the parish of Kilfinichen and Kilvickeon in Argyll and Bute, Scotland.

== List ==
Name	Location	Date Listed	Grid Ref. (Note: Sometimes known as OSGB36, the grid reference (where provided) is based on the British national grid reference system used by the Ordnance Survey. • "Guide to National Grid". Ordnance Survey. • "Get-a-map". Ordnance Survey.)	Geo-coordinates	Notes	LB Number (Note: Historic Environment Scotland assign a unique alphanumeric identifier to each designated site in Scotland, for listed buildings this always begins with "LB", for example "LB12345".)	Image
Beach Farm-House				56°20′18″N 6°06′24″W	Category C(S)	12303	Upload Photo
Iona Abbey				56°20′06″N 6°23′29″W	Category A	12310	Upload another image
Near Pier At Carsaig, Isle Of Mull, K6 Telephone Kiosk				56°19′33″N 5°58′49″W	Category B	50858	Upload Photo
Inniemore Lodge, Carsaig, By Pennyghael, Isle Of Mull				56°19′26″N 5°58′34″W	Category B	43028	Upload Photo
Pennycross Pennycross				56°21′45″N 6°02′20″W	Category B	12300	Upload Photo
Bunessan Church Of Scotland (Kilvickeon Kirk) Bunessan				56°18′59″N 6°14′02″W	Category C(S)	12305	Upload Photo
Maol Buidne Byre Aridhglas Creich				56°19′47″N 6°20′29″W	Category C(S)	13814	Upload Photo
Tavool House Ardmeanach				56°22′07″N 6°09′04″W	Category B	12298	Upload Photo
Gate Cottage, Poit-I				56°18′29″N 6°20′37″W	Category C(S)	12287	Upload Photo
Killiemore House, Kilfinichen				56°22′58″N 6°03′21″W	Category B	12299	Upload Photo
Argyll Arms Hotel Bunessan				56°18′57″N 6°14′09″W	Category C(S)	12306	Upload Photo
'Bishop's House' (Tigh An Easbuig)				56°20′08″N 6°23′27″W	Category B	12312	Upload Photo
St. Mary's Chapel (Caibeal Moire)				56°20′03″N 6°23′28″W	Category B	12313	Upload Photo
St. Oran's Chapel Reilig Odhrain				56°20′04″N 6°23′34″W	Category A	12314	Upload another image
Iona Nunnery				56°19′52″N 6°23′39″W	Category A	12317	Upload another image
Dhu Heartach Lighthouse				56°07′59″N 6°37′58″W	Category A	12320	Upload another image
St. Kenneth's Chapel Inchkenneth				56°26′29″N 6°09′33″W	Category A	12297	Upload another image
St. Ewen's Chapel, Kilvickeon Burial Ground				56°17′53″N 6°11′05″W	Category C(S)	12307	Upload Photo
Observatory				56°17′54″N 6°22′18″W	Category C(S)	12309	Upload Photo
Maclean's Cross				56°19′57″N 6°23′36″W	Category A	12315	Upload another image
Old Corn Mill, Bunessan				56°19′01″N 6°13′48″W	Category C(S)	12948	Upload Photo
Carsaig Home Farm				56°19′30″N 5°58′51″W	Category C(S)	12302	Upload Photo
Braigh Croft Cottage And Byre Achaidhean Glasa				56°18′02″N 6°15′12″W	Category B	12308	Upload Photo
St. Ronan's Chapel				56°19′53″N 6°23′38″W	Category B	12316	Upload Photo
Iona Manse				56°19′56″N 6°23′40″W	Category C(S)	12319	Upload Photo
Kilfinichen Bay, Kilfinichen Kirk				56°22′58″N 6°03′51″W	Category B	12422	Upload Photo
Pennyghael House				56°21′35″N 6°01′19″W	Category C(S)	12304	Upload Photo
Iona Kirk				56°19′57″N 6°23′39″W	Category B	12318	Upload another image See more images
Carsaig (Or Penny Cross) House				56°19′29″N 5°58′49″W	Category B	12301	Upload Photo

== Key ==
The scheme for classifying buildings in Scotland is:

- Category A: "buildings of national or international importance, either architectural or historic; or fine, little-altered examples of some particular period, style or building type."
- Category B: "buildings of regional or more than local importance; or major examples of some particular period, style or building type, which may have been altered."
- Category C: "buildings of local importance; lesser examples of any period, style, or building type, as originally constructed or moderately altered; and simple traditional buildings which group well with other listed buildings."

In March 2016 there were 47,288 listed buildings in Scotland. Of these, 8% were Category A, and 50% were Category B, with the remaining 42% being Category C.

== See also ==
- List of listed buildings in Argyll and Bute
