= Municipal District of Fairview No. 136 =

Municipal district in Alberta, Canada

- Municipal district
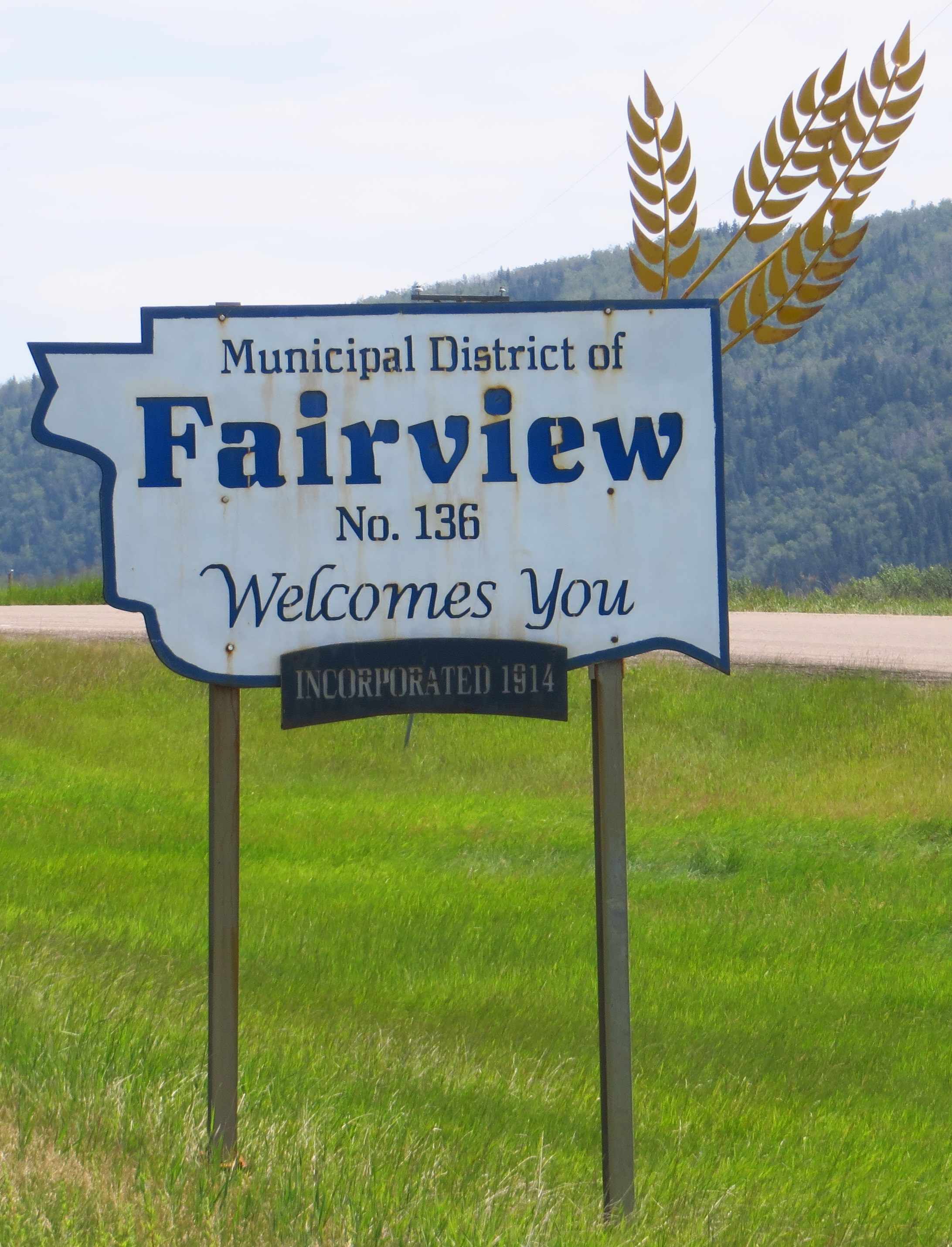
- Boundary sign at Dunvegan Bridge

- Logo

- Location within Alberta
- Country: Canada
- Province: Alberta
- Region: Northern Alberta
- Planning region: Upper Peace
- Established: 1913
- Incorporated: 1914

Government
  - Reeve: Peggy Johnson
  - Governing body: M.D. of Fairview Council
  - Administrative office: Fairview

Area (2021)
  - Land: 1,373.66 km^{2} (530.37 sq mi)

Population (2021)
  - Total: 1,580
  - Density: 1.2/km^{2} (3.1/sq mi)
- Time zone: UTC−06:00 (Alberta Time)
- Website: mdfairview.com

The Municipal District of Fairview No. 136 is a municipal district (MD) in northwestern Alberta, Canada. It is located in Census Division 19.

The district stretches along the northwestern leg of Highway 2.

== Geography ==
=== Communities and localities ===
The following urban municipalities are surrounded by the MD of Fairview No. 136.

Cities

- none

Towns

- Fairview

Villages

- none

Summer villages

- none

The following hamlets are located within the MD of Fairview No. 136.

Hamlets

- Bluesky
- Whitelaw

The following localities are located within the MD of Fairview No. 136.

Localities

- Dunvegan
- Erin Lodge
- Friedenstal
- Gage
- Highland Park
- Lothrop
- Red Star
- Scotswood
- Vanrena
- Waterhole

== Demographics ==
Federal census population history
Year	Pop.	±%
1916	790	—
1921	1,456	+84.3%
1926	1,507	+3.5%
1931	2,264	+50.2%
1936	2,443	+7.9%
1941	2,326	−4.8%
1946	2,074	−10.8%
1951	2,031	−2.1%
1956	1,885	−7.2%
1961	1,917	+1.7%
1966	1,745	−9.0%
1971	1,901	+8.9%
1976	1,755	−7.7%
1981	1,889	+7.6%
1986	1,903	+0.7%
1991	1,812	−4.8%
1996	1,829	+0.9%
2001	1,806	−1.3%
2006	1,432	−20.7%
2011	1,673	+16.8%
2016	1,604	−4.1%
Source: Statistics Canada

In the 2021 Census of Population conducted by Statistics Canada, the MD of Fairview No. 136 had a population of 1,580 living in 613 of its 707 total private dwellings, a change of −1.5% from its 2016 population of 1,604. With a land area of 1,373.66 km^{2} (530.37 sq mi), it had a population density of 1.2/km^{2} (3.0/sq mi) in 2021.

In the 2016 Census of Population conducted by Statistics Canada, the MD of Fairview No. 136 had a population of 1,604 living in 620 of its 683 total private dwellings, a −4.1% change from its 2011 population of 1,673. With a land area of 1,387.58 km^{2} (535.75 sq mi), it had a population density of 1.2/km^{2} (3.0/sq mi) in 2016.

== See also ==
- List of communities in Alberta
- List of municipal districts in Alberta
