= Fairview, Alberta =

Fairview
- Town
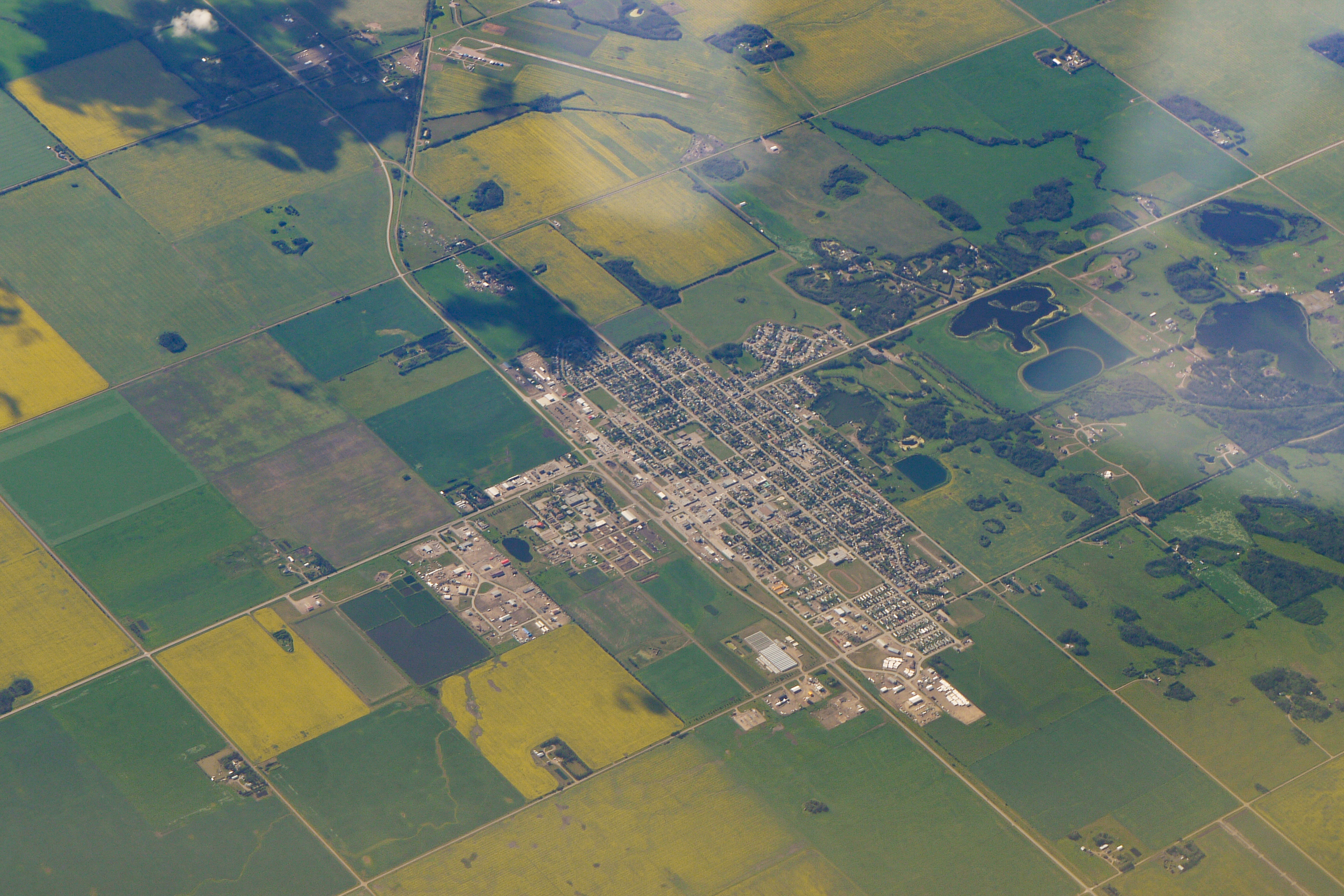
- Aerial image of Fairview from July 2016.
- Motto: Heart of the Peace Country!
- Town boundaries

- Location in Alberta Location in MD of Fairview
- Coordinates: 56°04′18″N 118°23′34″W
- Country: Canada
- Province: Alberta
- Region: Northern Alberta
- Planning region: Upper Peace
- Municipal district: Municipal District of Fairview No. 136
- Incorporated
  - Village: March 28, 1929
  - Town: April 25, 1949

Government
  - Mayor: Gordon MacLeod
  - Governing body: Fairview Town Council
  - MP: Arnold Viersen (Cons)
  - MLA: Todd Loewen (I)

Area (2021)
  - Land: 10.67 km^{2} (4.12 sq mi)
- Elevation: 670 m (2,200 ft)

Population (2021)
  - Total: 2,817
  - Density: 263.9/km^{2} (683/sq mi)
- Time zone: UTC−06:00 (Alberta Time)
- Postal code span: T0H 1L0
- Highways: Highway 2 Highway 64
- Website: www.fairview.ca

Fairview is a town in Peace Country, Alberta, Canada. It is located 82 km (51 mi) southwest of Peace River and 115 km (71 mi) north of Grande Prairie at the intersection of Highway 2 and Highway 64A.

== History ==
In 1928, the railroad extended west from Whitelaw through the Beaver Indian Reserve across a stubble field where the Hamlet of Fairview was established. The community of Waterhole, five miles to the south, was packed onto skids and wagons and relocated to the railroad site. The first train rolled into Fairview on November 2, 1928. The hamlet was incorporated as a village on April 22, 1929. In 1949, the village was incorporated into the Town of Fairview.

=== Climate ===
Fairview experiences a humid continental climate (Köppen climate classification Dfb).

Climate data for Fairview
Month	Jan	Feb	Mar	Apr	May	Jun	Jul	Aug	Sep	Oct	Nov	Dec	Year
Record high °C (°F)	10 (50)	13 (55)	15.6 (60.1)	29.4 (84.9)	32.2 (90.0)	33.3 (91.9)	35.6 (96.1)	34.4 (93.9)	31.1 (88.0)	26.1 (79.0)	18.3 (64.9)	8.9 (48.0)	35.6 (96.1)
Mean daily maximum °C (°F)	−9.8 (14.4)	−6.4 (20.5)	−0.6 (30.9)	9.3 (48.7)	16.4 (61.5)	19.9 (67.8)	21.8 (71.2)	20.6 (69.1)	15.2 (59.4)	8.5 (47.3)	−2.6 (27.3)	−8.3 (17.1)	7 (45)
Daily mean °C (°F)	−13.8 (7.2)	−10.8 (12.6)	−5.3 (22.5)	4.1 (39.4)	10.5 (50.9)	14.3 (57.7)	16.3 (61.3)	15 (59)	10 (50)	4 (39)	−6.7 (19.9)	−12.3 (9.9)	2.1 (35.8)
Mean daily minimum °C (°F)	−17.9 (−0.2)	−15.1 (4.8)	−9.9 (14.2)	−1.2 (29.8)	4.5 (40.1)	8.7 (47.7)	10.7 (51.3)	9.3 (48.7)	4.9 (40.8)	−0.5 (31.1)	−10.4 (13.3)	−16.3 (2.7)	−2.8 (27.0)
Record low °C (°F)	−44.4 (−47.9)	−43.9 (−47.0)	−36.1 (−33.0)	−31.7 (−25.1)	−10.6 (12.9)	−1.7 (28.9)	1.1 (34.0)	−3.9 (25.0)	−11.1 (12.0)	−26 (−15)	−38 (−36)	−45 (−49)	−45 (−49)
Average precipitation mm (inches)	26.3 (1.04)	22.8 (0.90)	20 (0.8)	19.2 (0.76)	47 (1.9)	76.6 (3.02)	78.2 (3.08)	61 (2.4)	37.8 (1.49)	30.3 (1.19)	23.1 (0.91)	29.3 (1.15)	471.6 (18.57)
Source: Environment Canada

== Demographics ==
Federal census population history
Year	Pop.	±%
1931	260	—
1936	393	+51.2%
1941	432	+9.9%
1946	487	+12.7%
1951	929	+90.8%
1956	1,260	+35.6%
1961	1,506	+19.5%
1966	1,884	+25.1%
1971	2,118	+12.4%
1976	2,248	+6.1%
1981	2,869	+27.6%
1986	2,998	+4.5%
1991	3,023	+0.8%
1996	3,316	+9.7%
2001	3,150	−5.0%
2006	3,300	+4.8%
2011	3,162	−4.2%
2016	2,998	−5.2%
Source: Statistics Canada

In the 2021 Census of Population conducted by Statistics Canada, the Town of Fairview had a population of 2,817 living in 1,201 of its 1,376 total private dwellings, a change of −6% from its 2016 population of 2,998. With a land area of 10.67 km^{2} (4.12 sq mi), it had a population density of 264.0/km^{2} (683.8/sq mi) in 2021.

In the 2016 Census of Population conducted by Statistics Canada, the Town of Fairview recorded a population of 2,998 living in 1,251 of its 1,363 total private dwellings, a −5.2% change from its 2011 population of 3,162. With a land area of 11.36 km^{2} (4.39 sq mi), it had a population density of 263.9/km^{2} (683.5/sq mi) in 2016.

== Arts and culture ==
Fairview hosts the following events:

- Agriculture Society Fair
- Fairview & District Lions Club Annual Old Time Country Music Festival
- The Annual Waterhole Pro Rodeo and Parade
- Malanka Ukrainian New Year
- The Peace Classic Wheels Car Show
- Annual Summers End Festival
- Emergency Services Regimental Ball

== Attractions ==
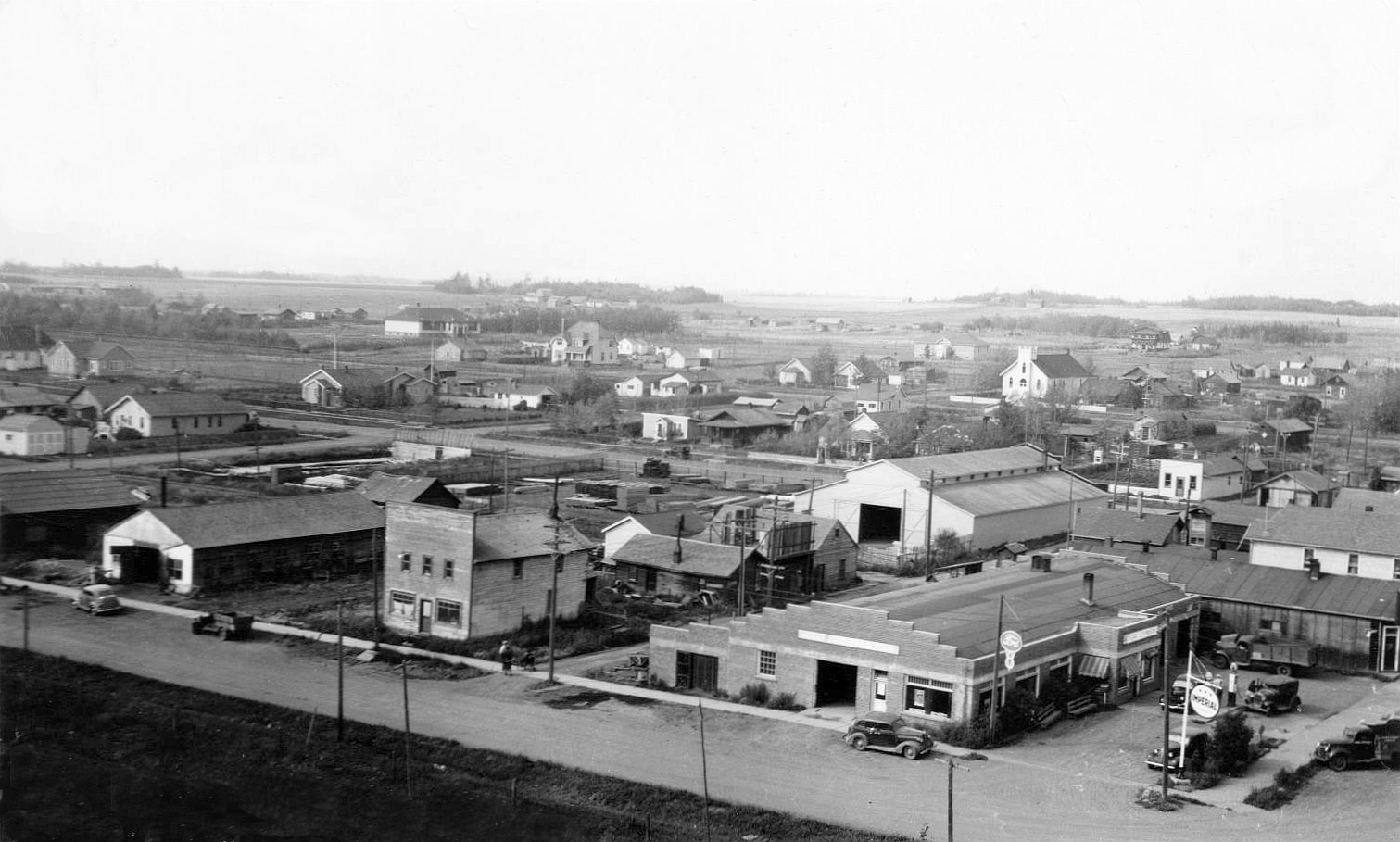
Fairview, 1945

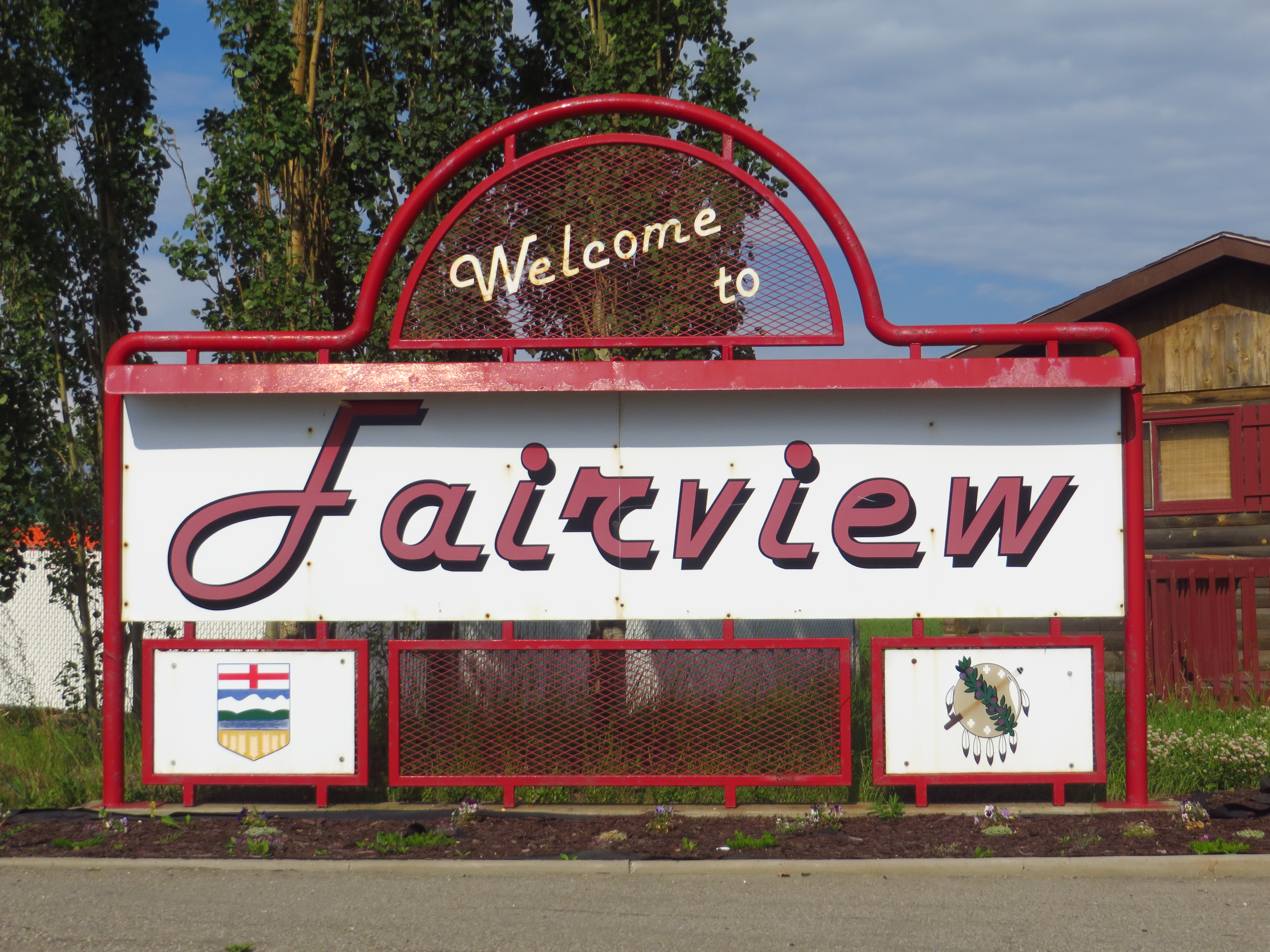
Welcome sign

Fairview offers indoor swimming at the Fairview Aquatic Centre, golfing at the Fairview Golf Course, skating at the Fairplex, skiing at the Fairview Ski Hill, as well as curling, and bowling.

The Fairview Regional Aquatic Centre was a $3.4M collaborative project taken on by the Town of Fairview and the M.D. of Fairview No. 136. The facility has a waterslide, a zero depth wading pool, a 25m lap pool, a Tarzan swing, monkey bars, a whirlpool, and a climbing wall. The Fairview Olympians swim club is located there, and offers various programming.

== Sports ==
The Fairview Flyers were established in 2012, and compete in the North West Junior Hockey League.

== Government ==
The Town of Fairview is governed by a mayor (Gord MacLeod) and six councillors. Fairview is part of the federal electoral district of Peace River—Westlock, and is represented in the House of Commons by Arnold Viersen of the Conservative Party of Canada. Provincially, Fairview is part of the electoral district of Central Peace-Notley and is represented in the Legislative Assembly by Todd Loewen of the United Conservative Party.

== Education ==
Fairview has several schools, including:

- St. Thomas More Catholic School (K-12)
- EE Oliver School (K-6)
- Fairview High School (7–12)
- Northern Lakes College (formerly affiliated with Grande Prairie Regional College until 2026)

== Media ==
The Fairview Post is local newspaper that covers the town and surrounding area. It was founded by Hec MacLean, a renowned sportswriter who formerly worked for the Calgary Herald. It is now owned by Sun Media Corporation, under Quebecor. Fairview is also served bi-weekly by an alternative newspaper, The Vault Magazine.

== Notable people ==
- Stephen Notley, author and illustrator of Bob the Angry Flower
- Jordan Peterson, cultural critic, author, clinical psychologist, and professor emeritus of the University of Toronto.
- Rachel Notley, former leader of the Alberta New Democratic Party (2014–2024) and Premier of Alberta (2015–2019).

== See also ==
- List of communities in Alberta
- List of towns in Alberta
