= First Nations in Alberta =

Group of people who live in the Canadian province of Alberta

First Nations in Alberta are a group of people who live in the Canadian province of Alberta. The First Nations are peoples (or nations) recognized as Indigenous peoples in Canada, excluding the Inuit and the Métis. According to the 2011 Census, a population of 116,670 Albertans self-identified as First Nations. Specifically there were 96,730 First Nations people with registered Indian Status and 19,945 First Nations people without registered Indian Status. Alberta has the third largest First Nations population among the provinces and territories (after Ontario and British Columbia). From this total population, 47.3% of the population lives on an Indian reserve and the other 52.7% live in urban centres. According to the 2011 Census, the First Nations population in Edmonton (the provincial capital) totalled at 31,780, which is the second highest for any city in Canada (after Winnipeg). The First Nations population in Calgary, in reference to the 2011 Census, totalled at 17,040. There are 45 First Nations or "bands" in Alberta (in the sense of governments made up of a council and a chief), belonging to nine different ethnic groups or "tribes" based on their ancestral languages.

== Classifications ==
There are a variety of ways of classifying the various First Nations groups in Alberta. In anthropological terms there are two broad cultural groupings in Alberta based on different climatic/ecological regions and the ways of life adapted to those regions. In the northern part of the province the Subarctic peoples relied on boreal species such as moose, woodland caribou, etc. as their main prey animals, extensively practised ice fishing, and utilized canoes, snowshoes, and toboggans for transportation. The Plains Indians of the south lived primarily in a prairie grasslands environment (but with access as well to the nearby Rocky Mountains) and relied on the plains bison (or "buffalo") as their major food source and used the travois for transportation. Peoples in the central, aspen parkland belt of Alberta practiced hybrid cultures with features of both the aforementioned groups.

At the time of contact with Euro-Canadian observers, all of the indigenous peoples in Alberta belonged to several overlapping groups: lodges, bands, tribes, and confederacies. The smallest unit was the lodge, which is what observers called an extended family or any other group living in the same dwelling such as a teepee or wigwam. Several lodges living together formed a band. Bands were highly mobile small groups consisting of a respected (male) leader sometimes called a chief, possibly his extended family, and other unrelated families. The band was a fundamental unit of organization, as a band was large enough to defend itself and engage in communal hunts, yet small enough to be mobile and to make decisions by consensus (leaders had only charismatic authority and no coercive power). Lodges and individuals were free to leave bands, and bands regularly split in two or merged with another, yet no one would want to be without the protection of living in a band for very long. Bands among the Peigan people in southern Alberta ranged in size from 10 to 30 lodges, or about 80 to 240 persons. One band, the Peeaysees, disappeared after 1911 when they were dismissed from Treaty 6 for their involvement in the Northwest Rebellion.

By contrast, a tribe is an ethnic affiliation. A tribe is a group of people who recognize each other as compatriots due to shared language and culture. Bands from the same tribe, speaking the same language, usually relied on each other as allies against outsiders, but in Alberta tribes were not institutionalized, and decision making consisted of leaders from various bands meeting together in council to reach consensus. There are approximately nine indigenous ethnic or tribal groups in Alberta in the twenty-first century, depending on how they are counted. They are the Beaver / Daneẕaa, Blackfoot / Niitsítapi, Chipewyan / Denésoliné, Plains Cree / Paskwāwiyiniwak, Sarcee / Tsuu T'ina, Saulteaux (Plains Ojibwa) / Nakawē, Slavey / Dene Tha', Stoney / Nakoda, and the Woodland Cree / Sakāwithiniwak. Within these boundaries there is much fluidity, however, as intermarriages and bilingual bands were once very common. Scholar Neal McLeod points out that bands were loose, temporary groupings which were often polyethnic and multilingual, so that most mentions of "the Cree" by historians of previous decades actually refer to mixed Cree-Assiniboine-Saulteax groups. As well the smallpox outbreak of 1780–1781 and the whooping cough outbreak of 1819–1820 decimated many bands, forcing them to merge with neighbours.

Anthropologists and others often group peoples together based on which language family their ancestral language is from, as peoples with related languages often also have cultural similarities. All of the groups presently represented in Alberta belong to one of three large language families, and are related to other languages across the continent. These are the Algonquian (Blackfoot, Cree, and Saulteaux), the Athabaskan or Dene (Beaver, Chipewyan, Slavey, and Sarcee), and the Siouan (Stoney) families. The list of tribal groups in Alberta is not fixed and is based on differing interpretations of what constitutes a "tribe". The Blackfoot people consist of three dialect groups who were close allies, the Siksika, Piikani, and the Kainai; they are sometimes considered separate tribes or nations in their own right. The largest First Nations cultural group by population in Alberta is the Cree, if the Woodlands Cree and Plains Cree are counted together. Thirty-two First Nations bands in Alberta are affiliated with Cree culture and are related to other Cree peoples across Canada as far east as Labrador. The Woodland Cree practised a Subarctic culture, and the Plains Cree a Plains culture and they spoke different but related dialects of the Cree language. Several peoples in Alberta fall under the term Dene, which is a name used by many related peoples in the Northwest Territories. In Alberta this includes the Beaver, Chipewyan, Slavey, and Sarcee. All Dene peoples share similar spiritual beliefs and social organization, but the Sarcee people are a Plains people, while the others are Subarctic. The Stoney people are related to the Assiniboine and Sioux and may be considered a branch of either of those groups. The Stoney themselves are divided into Woodlands (Paul and Alexis bands) and Plains sections (Bearspaw, Chiniki, and Welsey bands). The Saulteaux people are represented by only one band in Alberta, the O'Chiese First Nation. There many other Saulteaux bands in Saskatchewan and Manitoba, however, and the Saulteaux themselves a branch of the larger Ojibwe and Anishinaabe groups. Besides all of these groups, there are also non-Status Indians of mixed Cree-Iroquois origin living in Hinton-Grande Cache region of the Rocky Mountains and foothills. They are represented by the Aseniwuche Winewak Nation of Canada, which is a non-for-profit society and not a band under the Indian Act.

Other tribes are known to have inhabited Alberta in the past. The Cluny Earthlodge Village at Blackfoot Crossing is a unique-in-Canada example of a permanent fortified village of earthlodges probably built around 1740 CE by Hidatsa or Mandan peoples. The Assiniboine people lived in Alberta at the time of European contact, and it is thought that the Stoney people who still live in the province began as a branch of the Assiniboine. Early accounts by European explorers suggest that the Eastern Shoshone are thought to have lived in Alberta before being displaced by in Blackfoot by 1787. The Gros Ventres were reported living in two north-south tribal groups; one, the so-called Fall Indians (Canadian or northern group) of 260 lodges (≈2,500 population) traded with the North West Company on the Saskatchewan River and roamed between the Missouri and Bow Rivers. They were active in southern Alberta through the late 1800s, but were based near present-day Fort Belknap, Montana by 1862 when Jesuit missionaries arrived there. The U.S. and Canadian governments sought to keep nomadic peoples from crossing the border, and the Americans opened an Indian agency to supply the Gros Ventre with aid at Fort Belknap first from 1871-1876, and permanently in 1878, with a reservation there being established in 1881. The Kutenai migrated westwards out of Alberta, possibly in the early eighteenth century, but still occasionally ventured into the Bow River region to hunt bison by the time of European contact. As well, people from other ethnic groups, such the Métis and Iroquois occasionally intermarried with local peoples and were adopted into existing bands or created their own new bands of mixed heritage. An example is the Michel Band from the Calahoo area, many of whom are descended from William Callihoo, an Iroquois or Métis fur trader from the east who married one or more local Cree women and founded the band.

Plains peoples were able to congregate into larger communities often when following large buffalo herds and had more complex political structures than Subarctic peoples who had to remain dispersed to find enough food (even centuries later there are more First Nations band governments in the north, but the fewer southern communities are much more populous). A group of bands united into a semi-permanent alliance for common defence was called a confederacy by non-Native observers. Such confederacies were often multi-ethnic in that they included bands from a number of tribes. The two key confederacies in what later became central and southern Alberta during the eighteenth and nineteenth centuries were the Blackfoot Confederacy (consisting of bands from the Piegan, Kainai, Sikisika nations, later joined by the Tsuu T'ina and, for a time, Gros Ventre) and the Iron Confederacy (bands of Plains Cree, Assiniboine, and Saulteaux, and Stoney). Initially on friendly terms, these two grouping eventually become long-term enemies (the Battle River was named for conflict between the two groups that happened near it approximately 1810, around the beginning of their hostilities) until the Battle of the Belly River on October 25, 1870 near present-day Lethbridge.

When Canada acquired a claim in what is now Alberta in 1870, a process of treaty-making began. The federal government negotiated with various chiefs and councils made up of groups of allied bands. But each band was free to sign or not sign a treaty. There are three main treaties affecting Alberta. Treaty 6 is between Canada and the Plains Cree and allied bands, with the main signings occurring from 1876 to 1879 with many later additions, and covers the area of central Alberta. Treaty 7 involves the member tribes of Blackfoot Confederacy as well as the Stoney and was signed in 1877 and covers southern Alberta. Treaty 8 involves the Woods Cree, Beaver, and Chipweyan, was signed in 1899 and covers northern Alberta. Under the terms of these treaties, more southerly bands accepted the presence of Canadian settlers on their lands in exchange for emergency and ongoing aid to deal with the starvation being experienced by the plains people due to the disappearance of the bison herds. Northern bands did not face agricultural settlement (to the same extent), but instead mining and lumber companies wanted access to their lands. In both cases Indian reserves were to be created where First Nations were expected to settle (meaning to end the nomadic hunting lifestyle) perhaps to begin farming, but certainly to be accessible to the authorities such as the Indian agents, North-West Mounted Police, and Christian missionaries. Not all bands were equally reconciled to the ideas of the treaties, however. Piapot's band signed into a treaty but refused to choose a site for a reserve, preferring to remain nomadic. The "Battle River Crees" under the leadership of Big Bear and Little Pine refused to sign altogether. Under the reserve system, each band is attached to one or more reserves. The band has a list of members, part of the nationwide Indian Register, and these members are eligible to live on reserve and receive treaty benefits. The band is now considered the fundamental unit of governance under the Indian Act, first passed in 1876 and still in force with modifications. Modern band governments are the legal successors to the bands that signed the treaties. In the case of the Blackfoot Confederacy, each dialect group is considered a "band" (government) though they historically comprised many hunting bands, while in other cases band governments are direct successors to much smaller historic hunting bands, many of less than 100 people.

As of 2013 there were 48 band governments with their own councils and chiefs. For the purposes of the Indian Act, however, the federal government lists 45 separate band governments: the Saddle Lake First Nation and the Whitefish Lake (Goodfish) Nation are administered separately but considered one band, likewise the Chiniki, Wesley, and Bearspaw First Nations have separate administrations but for the purposes of the Indian Act are one band government called the Stoney Nakoda Nation. The above count also does not include bands headquartered in other provinces with reserves that are partially in Alberta, such as the Onion Lake Cree Nation of Saskatchewan. Band names and sizes, and well as reserve sizes are not static and have continued to change since the signing of the treaties. The newest First Nation band in Alberta is the Peerless Trout First Nation, which was created in 2010 as a separation from the Bigstone Cree Nation as part of a land claims agreement with the federal government.

== Tribal and regional organizations ==
Bands can pool their resources by creating regional councils (often called "Tribal Councils" though they may not represent a tribe in the usual sense) and treaty councils related to one of the three treaties dealing with Alberta. Alberta bands are members of the Athabasca Tribal Council, Confederacy of Treaty 6 First Nations, Four Nations Administration, Kee Tas Kee Now Tribal Council, Lesser Slave Lake Indian Regional Council, North Peace Tribal Council, Treaty 8 First Nations of Alberta, Treaty 7 Management Corporation, Western Cree Tribal Council, and Yellowhead Tribal Council.

== Demographics ==
=== Knowledge of language ===
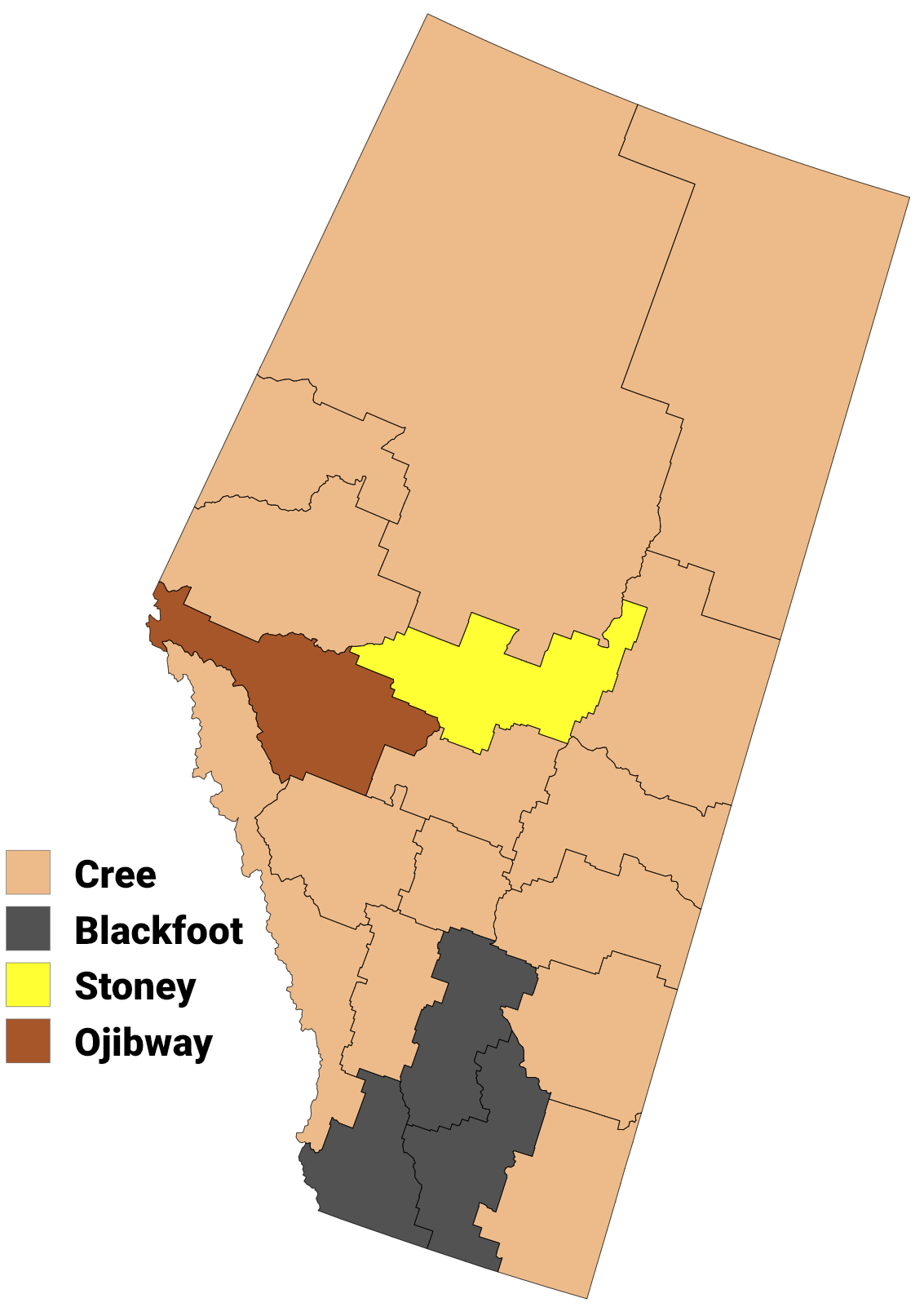
Largest First Nations knowledge of language in Alberta, 2021 census

== Indigenous organizations and services ==
Agencies are grouped by sectors, including arts and culture, business and economic development, communications and media, education, employment services, family services, friendship centres, health, healing and social services, housing services, legal services, urban organizations, women’s organizations, and youth organizations.

== First Nations in Alberta (2019) ==
Recognized First Nations band governments in Alberta
Nation		Reserves	Population (2019)			
Nation		Reserves	Total	On reserve	On other land	Off reserve
Alexander First Nation		Alexander 134	2,264	1,062	0	1,121
Alexis Nakota Sioux First Nation		Alexis 133; Alexis Cardinal River 234; Alexis Elk River 233; Alexis Whitecourt 232	2,066	1,171	0	823
Athabasca Chipewyan First Nation		Chipewyan 201; Chipewyan 201A; Chipewyan 201B; Chipewyan 201C; Chipewyan 201D; Chipewyan 201E; Chipewyan 201F; Chipewyan 201G	1,303	255	0	1,048
Beaver First Nation		Boyer 164; Child Lake 164A	1,147	449	38	660
Beaver Lake Cree Nation		Beaver Lake 131	1,210	398	0	776
Bigstone Cree Nation		Jean Baptiste Gambler 183; Wabasca 166; Wabasca 166A; Wabasca 166B; Wabasca 166C; Wabasca 166D	8,236	3,524	0	4,712
Blood Tribe (Kainai Nation)		Blood 148; Blood 148A	12,699	8,751	0	3,948
Chipewyan Prairie First Nation		Cowper Lake 194A; Janvier 194; Winefred Lake 194B	983	395	0	576
Cold Lake First Nations		Cold Lake 149; Cold Lake 149A; Cold Lake 149B; Cold Lake 149C	2,960	1,322	1	1,637
Dene Tha' First Nation		Amber River 211; Bistcho Lake 213; Bushe River 207; Hay Lake 209; Jackfish Point 214; Upper Hay River 212; Zama Lake 210	3,149	2,161	0	988
Driftpile First Nation		Driftpile River 150	2,889	963	51	1,875
Duncan's First Nation		Duncan's 151A; William McKenzie 151K	328	144	2	182
Enoch Cree Nation		Enoch Cree Nation 135; Enoch Cree Nation 135A	2,792	1,805	43	944
Ermineskin Cree Nation		Ermineskin 138	4,879	3,290	11	1,578
Fort McKay First Nation		Fort McKay 174; Fort McKay 174C; Fort McKay 174D; Namur Lake 174B; Namur River 174A	893	421	4	468
Fort McMurray First Nation		Clearwater 175; Gregoire Lake 176; Gregoire Lake 176A; Gregoire Lake 176B	860	282	1	577
Frog Lake First Nation		Puskiakiwenin 122; Unipouheos 121	3,391	1,850	0	1,541
Heart Lake First Nation		Heart Lake 167; Heart Lake 167A	363	204	0	159
Horse Lake First Nation		Clear Hills 152C; Horse Lakes 152B	1,238	507	0	731
Kapawe'no First Nation		Kapawe'no 150B; Kapawe'no 150C; Kapawe'no 150D; Kapawe'no 229; Kapawe'no 230; Kapawe'no 231	393	130	10	253
Kehewin Cree Nation		Kehewin 123	2,240	1,183	0	1,057
Little Red River Cree Nation		Fox Lake 162; John D'Or Prairie 215	5,942	4,614	647	681
Loon River First Nation		Loon Lake 235; Loon Prairie 237; Swampy Lake 236	668	523	14	131
Louis Bull Tribe		Louis Bull 138B	2,391	1,638	8	745
Lubicon Lake Band		Still being surveyed	715	107	232	376
Mikisew Cree First Nation		Allison Bay 219; Charles Lake 225; Collin Lake 233; Cornwall Lake 244; Devil's Gate 220; Dog Head 218; Old Fort 217; Peace Point 222; Sandy Point 221	3,173	172	492	2,509
Montana First Nation		Montana 139	1,067	725	0	342
O'Chiese First Nation		O'Chiese 203; O'Chiese Cemetery 203A	1,453	926	0	527
Paul First Nation		Buck Lake 133C; Wabamun 133A; Wabamun 133B	2,171	1,339	0	832
Peerless Trout First Nation		Peerless Trout 238	970	53	755	162
Piikani Nation		Piikani 147; Peigan Timber Limit B	3,917	2,451	0	1,466
Saddle Lake Cree Nation		Saddle Lake 125; Whitefish Lake 128	11,006	6,691	0	4,315
Samson Cree Nation		Samson 137; Samson 137A	8,947	6,230	13	2,704
Sawridge First Nation		Sawridge 150G; Sawridge 150H	521	42	0	479
Siksika Nation		Siksika 146	7,534	4,120	2	3,412
Smith's Landing First Nation		ʔejëre K’elnı Kuę́ 196I; Hokédhe Kué 196E; K’ı Kué 196D; Łı̨ Dezé 196C; Tthebacha Náre 196A; Tthebatthıe 196; Ts’u K’adhe Kué 196F; Ts’u Nedhé 196H; Ts’u Kué 196G; Tthejëre Ghaı̨lı̨ 196B	367	163	0	204
Stoney Nakoda First Nation	Bearspaw	Big Horn 144A; Eden Valley 216; Stoney 142, 143, 144; Stoney 142B	2,037	1,816	0	221
Stoney Nakoda First Nation	Chiniki	Big Horn 144A; Eden Valley 216; Stoney 142, 143, 144; Stoney 142B	1,801	1,594	0	207
Stoney Nakoda First Nation	Wesley	Big Horn 144A; Eden Valley 216; Stoney 142, 143, 144; Stoney 142B	1,818	1,551	2	265
Sturgeon Lake Cree Nation		Sturgeon Lake 154; Sturgeon Lake 154A; Sturgeon Lake 154B	3,466	1,505	43	1,918
Sucker Creek First Nation		Sucker Creek 150	2,930	759	38	2,133
Sunchild First Nation		Sunchild 202	1,410	819	0	591
Swan River First Nation		Assineau River 150F; Swan River 150	1,450	425	0	1,025
Tallcree Tribal Government		Beaver Ranch 163; Beaver Ranch 163A; Beaver Ranch 163B; Fort Vermilion 173B; Tallcree 173; Tallcree 173A; Wadlin Lake 173C	1,385	523	1	861
Tsuu T'ina Nation		Tsuu T'ina 145	2,427	2,089	1	337
Whitefish Lake First Nation		Utikoomak Lake 155; Utikoomak Lake 155A; Utikoomak Lake 155B	2,930	1,299	3	1,628
Woodland Cree First Nation		Woodland Cree 226; Woodland Cree 227; Woodland Cree 228	1,176	814	6	356

== See also ==
- List of Indian reserves in Alberta
- List of Aboriginal communities in Canada
- List of First Nations governments
- List of First Nations peoples
- Métis in Alberta
