= Lower Athabasca Region =

- Land-use framework region
- Location in Alberta
- Largest population centres: Fort McMurray; Cold Lake; Bonnyville; Lac La Biche

Government
  - Parent authority: Alberta Environment and Parks

Area
  - Total: 93,458 km^{2} (36,084 sq mi)

Population (2016)
  - Total: 118,799
  - Density: 1.2711/km^{2} (3.2923/sq mi)

The Lower Athabasca Region is a land-use framework region in northern Alberta, Canada. One of seven in the province, each is intended to develop and implement a regional plan, complementing the planning efforts of member municipalities in order to coordinate future growth. Corresponding roughly to major watersheds while following municipal boundaries, these regions are managed by Alberta Environment and Parks.

== Communities ==
The following municipalities are contained in the Lower Athabasca Region.

Cities

- Cold Lake

Urban service areas

- Fort McMurray
- Lac la Biche
- Plamondon

Towns

- Bonnyville

Villages

- Glendon

Summer villages

- Bonnyville Beach
- Pelican Narrows

Hamlets

- Anzac
- Ardmore
- Beaver Crossing
- Beaver Lake
- Beaverdam
- Cherry Grove
- Conklin
- Fort Chipewyan
- Fort Kent
- Fort Mackay
- Gregoire Lake Estates
- Hylo
- Iron River
- Janvier South
- La Corey
- Saprae Creek
- Therien
- Venice

Métis settlements

- Elizabeth Metis Settlement
- Fishing Lake Metis Settlement

Municipal districts

- Municipal District of Bonnyville

Specialized municipalities

- Lac La Biche County
- Regional Municipality of Wood Buffalo

Improvement districts

- Improvement District No. 349

Indian reserves

- Allison Bay 219
- Beaver Lake 131
- Charles Lake 225
- Chipewyan 201
- Chipewyan 201A
- Chipewyan 201B
- Chipewyan 201C
- Chipewyan 201D
- Chipewyan 201E
- Chipewyan 201F
- Chipewyan 201G
- Clearwater 175
- Cold Lake 149
- Cold Lake 149A
- Cold Lake 149B
- Cold Lake 149C
- Colin Lake 223
- Cowper Lake 194A
- Devil's Gate 220
- Dog Head 218
- Fort McKay 174
- Fort McKay 174C
- Fort McKay 174D
- Gregoire Lake 176
- Gregoire Lake 176A
- Gregoire Lake 176B
- Heart Lake 167
- Heart Lake 167A
- Hokedhe Tue 196E
- Janvier 194
- Kehewin 123
- Ki Tue 196D
- Li Deze 196C
- Namur Lake 174B
- Namur River 174A
- Old Fort 217
- Sand Point 221
- Thabacha Nare 196
- Thebathi 196
- Tsu Kadhe 196F
- Tsu Tue 196G
- Tthejëre Ghaı̨lı̨ 196B
- Winefred Lake 194B
