= Improvement District No. 24 =

Improvement district in Alberta, Canada

Improvement District No. 24 Improvement District No. 24 (Wood Buffalo)
- Improvement district
- Location within Alberta
- Coordinates: 59°2′N 113°19′W
- Country: Canada
- Province: Alberta
- Region: Northern Alberta
- Census division: No. 16
- Established: January 1, 1967
- Renumbered: January 1, 1969

Government
  - Governing body: Alberta Municipal Affairs (AMA)
  - Minister of AMA: Ric McIver
  - CAO: Troy Shewchuk
  - MLA: Dan Williams and Tany Yao

Area (2021)
  - Land: 33,053.78 km^{2} (12,762.14 sq mi)

Population (2021)
  - Total: 706
  - Density: 0/km^{2} (0/sq mi)
- Time zone: UTC−06:00 (Alberta Time)

Improvement District No. 24, or Improvement District No. 24 (Wood Buffalo), is an improvement district in Alberta, Canada. Coextensive with the portion of Wood Buffalo National Park in northeast Alberta, the improvement district provides local governance for lands within the park that are not within Indian reserves.

== History ==
Improvement District (ID) No. 24 was originally formed as ID No. 150 on January 1, 1967. ID No. 150 was renumbered to ID No. 24 on January 1, 1969.

== Geography ==
Improvement District (ID) No. 24 is adjacent to the northern boundary of the province of Alberta. It borders the Northwest Territories to the north, the Regional Municipality of Wood Buffalo to the east and south, and Mackenzie County to the west. The Peace River meanders eastward through ID No. 24, which at its confluence with Riviere des Rochers becomes the Slave River. The Athabasca River, Riviere des Rochers, and the Slave River comprise much of the eastern boundary of ID No. 24. Some of its water bodies include Baril Lake, Lake Claire, and Mamawi Lake. The majority of the Peace-Athabasca Delta is within the southeast portion of ID No. 24.

=== Communities and localities ===
No urban municipalities, hamlets, or urban service areas are within ID No. 24. A portion of the St. Bruno Farm settlement is within the northeast portion of the improvement district.

The following localities are within ID No. 24.

Localities

- Big Slough
- Carlson Landing
- Carlsons Landing
- Fifth Meridian
- Garden Creek
- Hay Camp
- Jackfish River
- Little Fishery
- Pointe de Roche
- Quatre Fourches
- Sweetgrass Landing
- Wood Buffalo National Park

First Nations have the following Indian reserves within ID No. 24.

Indian reserves

- Ɂejëre Kʼelnı Kuę́ 196I
- Peace Point 222
- Tthebatthıe 196
- Tsʼu Nedhé 196H

== Demographics ==
In the 2021 Census of Population conducted by Statistics Canada, Improvement District No. 24 had a population of 706 living in 113 of its 133 total private dwellings, a change of 9% from its 2016 population of 648. With a land area of 33,053.78 km^{2} (12,762.14 sq mi), it had a population density of 0.0/km^{2} (0.1/sq mi) in 2021.

In the 2016 Census of Population conducted by Statistics Canada, Improvement District No. 24 had a population of 648 living in 106 of its 123 total private dwellings, a change of 9.8% from its 2011 population of 590. With a land area of 33,416.30 km^{2} (12,902.11 sq mi), it had a population density of 0.0/km^{2} (0.1/sq mi) in 2016.

== Attractions ==
Alberta's portion of Wood Buffalo National Park is within Improvement District No. 24.

== Government ==
Improvement District No. 24 is governed by Alberta's Minister of Municipal Affairs.

== See also ==
- List of communities in Alberta
