= Smith's Landing =

Smith's Landing, Smiths Landing, or Smith Landing may refer to:

- Antioch, California, formerly Smith's Landing, a city in the United States
- Fitzgerald, Alberta, originally Smith's Landing, an unincorporated community in Canada, upstream from Fort Smith
- Ross River, Yukon, originally Smiths Landing, an unincorporated community in Canada
- Smith Landing, Denton, Maryland, a neighborhood in Denton, Maryland, United States
- Smith's Landing First Nation, a band government in Canada
- Smith's Landing, Georgia, an unincorporated community in Decatur County, Georgia, United States
- Smiths Landing, New Jersey, a community in Pleasantville, New Jersey, United States
- Smith's Landing, New York, a hamlet in Catskill, New York, United States
- Smiths Landing, New York, a community in Lowville, New York, United States
