= Wood buffalo =

A wood buffalo is another name for a wood bison.

Wood buffalo may also refer to:

- Fort McMurray-Wood Buffalo, a provincial electoral district in Alberta, Canada
- Regional Municipality of Wood Buffalo, a specialized municipality in northern Alberta, Canada
- Wood Buffalo National Park, a bison reserve in Alberta and Northwest Territories, Canada
