= Tsʼu Nedhé 196H =

Coordinates: 59°33′59″N 112°14′40″W

Tsʼu Nedhé 196H Pine Lake
- Indian reserve
- Tsʼu Nedhé Indian Reserve No. 196H
- Location in Alberta
- First Nation: Smith's Landing
- Treaty: 8
- Country: Canada
- Province: Alberta
- Improvement district: 24

Area
  - Total: 586 ha (1,450 acres)
- Time zone: UTC−06:00 (Alberta Time)

Tsʼu Nedhé 196H is an Indian reserve of the Smith's Landing First Nation in Alberta, located within Improvement District No. 24 (Wood Buffalo National Park).
