= Peace–Athabasca Delta =

River delta in Northeast Alberta

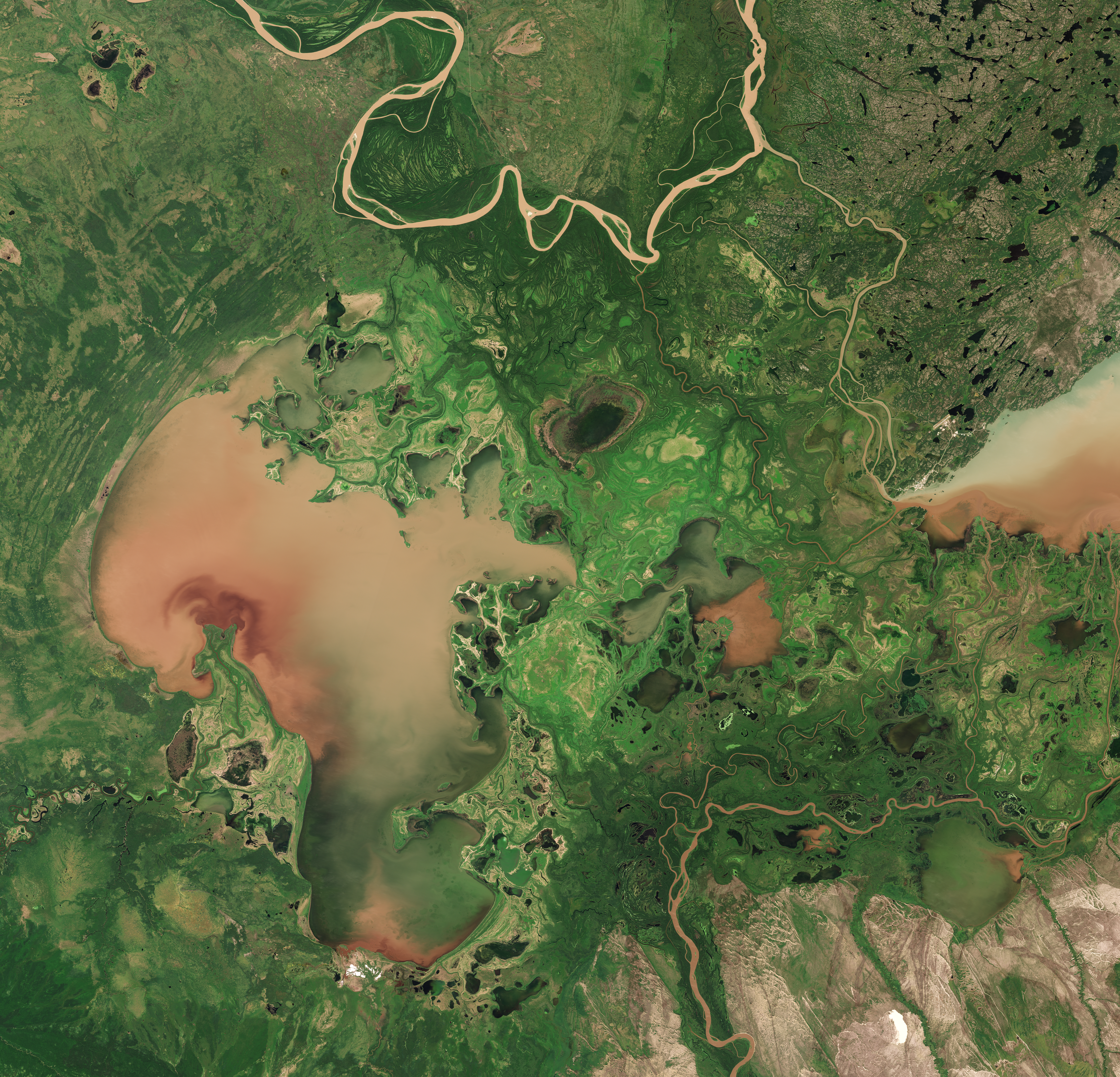
- Peace–Athabasca Delta with Lake Claire, west end of Lake Athabasca and mouths of Peace River (north) and Athabasca River (south)

- Location within Canada
- 58°42′N 111°30′W
- Location: Alberta, Canada

Site notes
- Area: 321,200 ha (794,000 acres)

UNESCO World Heritage Site
- Type: natural
- Designated: 1983 (7th session)
- Part of: Wood Buffalo National Park
- Reference no.: 256
- Region: List of World Heritage Sites in Canada

Ramsar Wetland
- Designated: 24 May 1982
- Reference no.: 241

The Peace–Athabasca Delta, located in northeast Alberta, is the largest freshwater inland river delta in North America. It is located partially within the southeast corner of Wood Buffalo National Park, Canada's largest national park, and also spreads into the Regional Municipality of Wood Buffalo, west and south of the historical community of Fort Chipewyan. The delta encompasses approximately 321,200 hectares (794,000 acres), formed where the Peace and Athabasca rivers converge on the Slave River and Lake Athabasca. The delta region is designated a wetland of international importance and a UNESCO World Heritage Site. The region is large enough that it is considered one of twenty distinct natural subregions of Alberta by the provincial government's Natural Regions Committee.

== History ==
Land use and occupation by the first indigenous people in the area can be traced to the retreat of the glaciers. The descendants of the Cree and Chipewyan First Nations continue to carry on traditional fishing, hunting and trapping activities. It is "the longest standing tradition of native subsistence use." Based on excavations in the 1980s at the Peace Point and Lake One Dune (IgPc-9) sites, archaeologist Marc Stevenson argued that the area around Peace Point has been occupied by boreal forest-related and plains-related northern hunter-gatherer groups of people "at intervals over the last 7000-8000 years."

In 1922, Wood Buffalo National Park was established to protect the remnant population of wood bison that escaped the slaughter in the late 19th century. It became the world's largest herd of free roaming wood bison, estimated at more than 5,000. It is one of two known nesting sites of whooping cranes.

In the late 1960s, the W.A.C. Bennett Dam was constructed on the Peace River in northern British Columbia by BC Hydro, a major hydropower utility. Between 1968 and 1971, "after the construction and initial filling of the W.A.C. Bennett hydroelectric dam at the headwaters of the Peace River", the Peace–Athabasca delta experienced a "prolonged dry period" that turned some basins from aquatic into terrestrial ecosystems.

In 1974, a major flood occurred in the region and, when the spring water receded, the delta experienced a second prolonged dry period.

On 24 May 1982, the Peace–Athabasca Delta region was designated by the Ramsar Convention as a wetland of international importance. The Ramsar Convention, an international treaty for the conservation and sustainable utilization of wetlands, was created to "stem the progressive encroachment on and loss of wetlands now and in the future". They recognize the "fundamental ecological functions of wetlands" that support a "characteristic flora and fauna, particularly waterfowl" and the economic, cultural, scientific, and recreational value of wetlands. The reasons for this designation as internationally significant are,

"The Peace–Athabasca Delta is the largest boreal delta in the world and is relatively undisturbed by civilization. It is one of the most important waterfowl nesting and staging areas in North America and is the staging area for breeding ducks and geese on their way to the MacKenzie River lowlands, Arctic river deltas and Arctic islands. Up to 400 000 birds may use the Delta in the spring, with more than one million birds in the autumn. The site also contains the largest undisturbed grass and sedge meadows in North America which are the prime range for an estimated 10, 000 wood and plains buffalo Bison bison athabascae and Bison bison bison."

— EC, 1993

In 1983, Peace–Athabasca Delta was designated a UNESCO World Heritage Site as one of the world's largest freshwater deltas, for its biological diversity and for the population of wild bison.

In 1986, Ducks Unlimited (Canada) and Alberta Energy and Natural Resources Fish and Wildlife Division proposed "the portion of the delta lying outside Wood Buffalo National Park, with the exception of the Chipewyan Indian Reserves, as a Wildlife Habitat Management Area.

By the 1990s, the National Water Research Institute was involved in a provincial-territorial-federal initiative, the Northern River Basins Study, and was conducting research on the hydro-climatology and ecology of the Peace–Athabasca Delta. They investigated potential impact on the delta's productivity and biodiversity if the climate were to change.

In the spring of 2006, BC Hydro dam managers released an agreed upon timed flow into the delta under appropriate hydrological and climatic conditions thereby increasing the magnitude of an ice-jam flood, producing the first major flood since c. 1986 and bringing restorative water to areas that had been dry since c.1986.

In June 2009, the Peace–Athabasca Delta Environmental Monitoring Program (PADEMP) held their first official meeting in Fort Smith with 17 groups participating, including federal, provincial and territorial governments and ten First Nations directly affected by the Peace–Athabasca Delta. PADEMP chair, Stuart Macmillan representing Parks Canada, observed that, "I think everybody realizes if we don’t do this now, we’re in danger of losing something very special in the delta. The rate of change is increasing so rapidly that we've got to get a handle on what's going on." According to Chris Heron, the NWT Metis Nation representative of the PADEMP, the use of traditional knowledge to determine the ecological health of the Peace–Athabasca Delta and their findings will be investigated using western science.(Bell 2009)

== Conservation ==
The marshes, lakes and mud flats of this area are an important habitat for waterfowl nesting and provides a staging area for migration.

The unique location and habitat of the Peace–Athabasca Delta region supports numerous species of waterbirds and is one of the most important places in North America for migrating waterbirds to rest, feed and breed.

Although all four major North American flyways, Atlantic, Mississippi, Central, and Pacific, cross the Peace–Athabasca Delta, it is "probably the most significant to the Mississippi and Central flyways." In the spring, there can be up 400,000 migrating birds. In the fall, the number reaches one million. Species include ducks, geese, swans and the endangered whooping crane, which has its natural nesting place in the delta.

The grass and sedge meadows of this area also provide habitat for several thousand wood and plains bison.

=== Influence of Bennett Dam ===
In the late 1960s, the W.A.C. Bennett Dam was constructed on the Peace River in northern British Columbia by BC Hydro, a major hydropower utility. The impacts of the dam on the delta have been disputed. Initial drops in water levels were mitigated by the construction of three rock-fill weirs on the Chenal des Quatre Fourches, Revillon Coupé, and Rivière des Rochers, the first of which was later removed due to complaints from muskrat trappers. The weirs restored mean open-season water levels nearly to pre-regulation levels.

Critical to the delta are spring ice-jam floods that play a critical role in refilling perched basins and wetlands outside of the permanently connected channels and lakes. It has been claimed that the dam reduced ice-jam floods, but recent studies are not able to verify this claim. Sediment records were used to reconstruct the history of flooding for the past 300 years. Maximum flood frequency was seen to reach a maximum in the early 1900s and declined in the 1940s and 1950s prior to the construction of the dam. There were no major ice-jam floods between 1975 and 1995 and this could be a result of the dam. Major ice-jam floods occurred in 1996 and 1997. There have been similar prolonged periods lacking major flooding including 1813 to 1839 and 1705 to 1786.

Studies of the climate and ecology of the Peace–Athabasca Delta have been carried out to understand the effect of the dam on delta. It was found that the recent decades are neither the driest nor the wettest that the delta has experienced in the past three hundred years. The early 1900s were some of the wettest conditions experienced by the delta. During the early- to mid-1900s there was a general trend of drying. While the delta is drier today than it was in the early parts of the 1900s, there is no clear indication that the dam is responsible. The Peace–Athabasca Delta is still well within the range of naturally variability due to natural changes in climate seen within the past few centuries.

An ongoing lawsuit between BC Hydro and local First Nations bands relates to the effects of Bennett Dam on delta water levels and associated traditional lifestyles.

== Waterways ==
The Birch River flows into Lake Claire, the largest lake completely in Alberta, which is an important part of the delta. Other water bodies located in the delta are Baril Lake, Mamawi Lake, Hilda Lake, Otter Lake, French Lake, Pair Lakes, Welstead Lake, Four Forks Lake, Galoot Lake, Pushup Lake, Jemis Lake, Richardson Lake, Flett Lake, Blanche Lake and Limon Lake.

Revillon Coupé, Rivière des Rochers and Chenal des Quatre Fourches are the main distributaries connecting Lake Athabasca and the point where Peace River flows into the Slave River. When the Peace River is in flood, the flow of these channels are reversed and water from the Peace flows into Lake Athabasca.

Other rivers draining the wetlands through the Peace–Athabasca Delta include Swift Current Creek, Carolyn Creek, Modere Creek, Steepbank River, McIvor River, Buckton Creek, Frog Creek, Sall River, Bolton Creek, Edra Creek, Peel Creek, Alice Creek, Mamawi Creek, Embarras River, Horse Island Creek, Chilloneys Creek, Claire River, Dempsey Creek, Baril River, Peltier Creek, Scow Channel, Powder Creek, and Revillon Coupe.

== See also ==
- Saskatchewan River Delta
