= Tthejëre Ghaı̨lı̨ 196B =

Coordinates: 59°49′08″N 111°55′44″W

Tthejëre Ghaı̨lı̨ 196B Salt River
- Indian reserve
- Tthejëre Ghaı̨lı̨ Indian Reserve No. 196B
- Boundaries of Tthejëre Ghaı̨lı̨ 196B

- Location in Alberta
- First Nation: Smith's Landing
- Treaty: 8
- Country: Canada
- Province: Alberta
- Specialized municipality: Wood Buffalo

Area
  - Total: 401.1 ha (991 acres)
- Time zone: UTC−06:00 (Alberta Time)

Tthejëre Ghaı̨lı̨ 196B, also known as Salt River, is an Indian reserve of the Smith's Landing First Nation in Alberta, located within the Regional Municipality of Wood Buffalo.
