= Ɂejëre Kʼelnı Kuę́ 196I =

Coordinates: 59°31′27″N 111°27′57″W

Ɂejëre Kʼelnı Kuę́ 196I Hay Camp
- Indian reserve
- Ɂejëre Kʼelnı Kuę́ Indian Reserve No. 196I
- Boundaries of Ɂejëre Kʼelnı Kuę́ 196I

- Location in Alberta
- First Nation: Smith's Landing
- Treaty: 8
- Country: Canada
- Province: Alberta
- Specialized municipality: Wood Buffalo

Area
  - Total: 213.0 ha (526 acres)
- Time zone: UTC−06:00 (Alberta Time)

Ɂejëre Kʼelnı Kuę́ 196I, also known as Hay Camp, is an Indian reserve in northern Alberta, Canada. The reserve is one of ten reserves under the governance of the Smith's Landing First Nation, known in their language as the Dene Ch'anie. The reserve is located on the west bank of Slave River within Wood Buffalo National Park, and comprises 213 ha (530 acres).

Ɂejëre Kʼelnı Kuę́ 196I is approximately 113 km (70 mi) north of Fort Chipewyan, and 62 km (39 mi) south of Fort Smith, Northwest Territories. An all-weather road, named Hay Camp Road, connects the reserve to Fort Smith and Fitzgerald.

== Name and etymology ==
The name ʔejëre K’elnı Kuę́ comes from the Dënesųłiné (Chipewyan) language of the Smith's Landing First Nation. It is properly spelled with a capital ʔ character, which represents a glottal stop in many Canadian First Nations languages. Because this character is not found on most Canadian keyboards, it is sometimes transcribed as a ?, P, or 7. Variant spellings include Ejere K'elni Kue, ?Ejere K'elni Kue, ɂejere K'elni Kųe, and Pejere Kʼelni Kue.

The first mentions of "Hay Camp" come from the turn of the 20th century, reflecting the area's status as one of many hay meadows and stopping-places along the Peace and Slave Rivers. The earliest period literature refers to the site as "Russell's Hay Camp", probably established in the 1890's by Jack Russell, a Métis riverman.

== History ==
Before the advent of air travel, the Slave River was the primary transportation corridor through the region, and ʔejëre K’elnı Kuę́, then known as Hay Camp, served as an important stopping place between Fort Chipewyan and Fort Smith. Most notably, though, Wood Buffalo National Park was established in 1922, and Hay Camp was chosen as the residence of the Chief Park Warden. As the park's superintendent then performed most of his duties from Ottawa, Hay Camp thus served as its de facto administrative center. As early as 1923, the meadows around Hay Camp were being cut to provide winter feed for the park wardens' horses, and by the spring of 1925 a house, stable, and warehouse had been constructed on the site.

In 1952, it was decided to conduct the park's annual buffalo slaughter at a permanent abattoir in Hay Camp, and to sell the meat commercially. By this time, most of the park's administrative functions had moved to Fort Smith. When the abattoir closed in 1967, Hay Camp gradually lost its importance as an operational headquarters. In the 1970s and 1980s, the site served as a fire base, but this was closed in 1992, the base moving to Pine Lake elsewhere in the park.

In 1994, a decision was made to remove all man-made structures and debris from Hay Camp, returning the site to a "natural state". By 1995, Hay Camp had been entirely abandoned. The last remaining structures, the cabin and fire tower, were removed in 1999.

Today, all that remains is the spirit of the place and the memories of those who lived and worked there.

— Parks Canada, Hay Camp/Ejere K'elni Kue: A Social and Land Use History (2001)

When the Smith's Landing First Nation (SLFN) was established on May 6, 2000, the band was entitled to select certain lands to serve as reserve sites, and Hay Camp was one such location. As a result, the site officially became known as ʔejëre K’elnı Kuę́, and was removed from the jurisdiction of the Park. Throughout the 20th century, many of the SLFN's people had worked for the various Park operations at Hay Camp. In a co-management agreement, both the SLFN and Parks Canada have stated their intent to collaboratively interpret the site's history.
