= Mikisew Cree First Nation =

Canadian First Nation

- Band No. 461
- ᒥᑭᓯᐤ mikisiw
- People: Woodland Cree
- Treaty: Treaty 8
- Headquarters: Fort Chipewyan
- Province: Alberta

Land
- Other reserves: Allison Bay 219; Charles Lake 225; Collin Lake 233; Cornwall Lake 244; Devil's Gate 220; Dog Head 218; Old Fort 217; Peace Point 222; Sandy Point 221
- Land area: 51.161 km^{2} (19.753 sq mi)

Population (2019)
- On reserve: 172
- On other land: 492
- Off reserve: 2509
- Total population: 3173

Government
- Chief: Melody Lepine-Dell

Tribal Council
- Athabasca Tribal Council

Website
- mikisewcree.ca

Mikisew Cree First Nation (/ˈmɪkɪsuː/; Cree: ᒥᑭᓯᐤ, mikisiw, meaning: "golden eagle") is an Indigenous First Nations government of Woodland Cree people in northeastern Alberta and in Northwest Territories, Canada.

Most Mikisew Cree First Nation members live in Fort McMurray, Edmonton, and Fort Chipewyan in Alberta and in Fort Smith, Northwest Territories.

According to former chief Lawrence Courtoreille, starting in 1944 many Dene people were induced by the government of to transfer their registration to the Mikisew band, including Courtoreille's own mother, leading to "a little over fifty percent" of the Mikisew Cree band members having some Dene heritage as of 2022. Dene people were denied access to hunting, fishing, and gathering within the boundaries of Wood Buffalo National Park unless they switched their registration, and were threatened with eviction from the Birch River settlement. In the end, Cree access to the park was restricted as well.

The Mikisew Cree First Nation is one of the five Athabasca Tribal Council Nations. The group signed a treaty in 1986 with Canada establishing several reserves. The Mikisew Cree won a case in the Supreme Court of Canada in 2005 over title interests to areas of the Wood Buffalo National Park.
