= Cornwall Lake 224 =

Coordinates: 59°36′10″N 110°35′49″W

- Indian reserve
- Cornwall Lake Indian Reserve No. 224
- Location in Alberta
- First Nation: Mikisew Cree
- Treaty: 8
- Country: Canada
- Province: Alberta
- Specialized municipality: Wood Buffalo

Area
  - Total: 69.3 ha (171 acres)
- Time zone: UTC−06:00 (Alberta Time)

Cornwall Lake 224 is an Indian reserve of the Mikisew Cree First Nation in Alberta, located within the Regional Municipality of Wood Buffalo.
