= Janvier South =

Hamlet in Alberta, Canada

- Hamlet
- Location of Janvier South Janvier South (Canada)
- Coordinates: 55°50′42″N 110°54′15″W
- Country: Canada
- Province: Alberta
- Region: Northern Alberta
- Census division: 16
- Municipal district: Regional Municipality of Wood Buffalo

Government
  - Type: Unincorporated
  - Governing body: Regional Municipality of Wood Buffalo Council

Area (2021)
  - Land: 5.01 km^{2} (1.93 sq mi)

Population (2021)
  - Total: 61
  - Density: 12.2/km^{2} (32/sq mi)
- Time zone: UTC−06:00 (Alberta Time)
- Area codes: 780, 587, 825

Janvier South is a hamlet in northern Alberta, Canada within the Regional Municipality (RM) of Wood Buffalo. While the hamlet's official name is Janvier South according to Alberta Municipal Affairs, it is also known and referred to as Janvier by the RM of Wood Buffalo and its residents. It is further alternately known as Chard. The latter name is after A. Chard, a transportation official.

Janvier South is located 6 kilometres (3.7 mi) northeast of Highway 881, approximately 94 kilometres (58 mi) southeast of Fort McMurray and 45 kilometres (28 mi) west of the Saskatchewan border.

== Demographics ==
In the 2021 Census of Population conducted by Statistics Canada, Janvier South had a population of 61 living in 26 of its 43 total private dwellings, a change of −39% from its 2016 population of 100. With a land area of 5.01 km^{2} (1.93 sq mi), it had a population density of 12.2/km^{2} (31.5/sq mi) in 2021.

The population of Janvier South according to the 2018 municipal census conducted by the Regional Municipality of Wood Buffalo is 141, a decrease from its 2012 municipal census population count of 171.

As a designated place in the 2016 Census of Population conducted by Statistics Canada, Janvier South had a population of 100 living in 41 of its 60 total private dwellings, a change of −3.8% from its 2011 population of 104. With a land area of 5.06 km^{2} (1.95 sq mi), it had a population density of 19.8/km^{2} (51.2/sq mi) in 2016.

== See also ==
- List of communities in Alberta
- List of designated places in Alberta
- List of hamlets in Alberta
