= Hokédhe Kué 196E =

Coordinates: 59°40′53″N 111°17′39″W

Hokédhe Kué 196E Myers Lake
- Indian reserve
- Hokédhe Kué Indian Reserve No. 196E
- Location in Alberta
- First Nation: Smith's Landing
- Treaty: 8
- Country: Canada
- Province: Alberta
- Specialized municipality: Wood Buffalo

Area
  - Total: 440.4 ha (1,088 acres)
- Time zone: UTC−06:00 (Alberta Time)

Hokédhe Kué 196E, also known as Myers Lake, is an Indian reserve of the Smith's Landing First Nation in Alberta, located within the Regional Municipality of Wood Buffalo.
