= Łı̨ Dezé 196C =

Coordinates: 59°52′08″N 111°33′13″W

Łı̨ Dezé 196C Dog River
- Indian reserve
- Łı̨ Dezé Indian Reserve No. 196C
- Location in Alberta
- First Nation: Smith's Landing
- Treaty: 8
- Country: Canada
- Province: Alberta
- Specialized municipality: Wood Buffalo

Area
  - Total: 729.4 ha (1,802 acres)
- Time zone: UTC−06:00 (Alberta Time)

Łı̨ Dezé 196C is an Indian reserve of the Smith's Landing First Nation in Alberta, located within the Regional Municipality of Wood Buffalo.
