= Tsʼu Kʼadhe Kué 196F =

Coordinates: 59°44′32″N 111°06′23″W

Tsʼu Kʼadhe Túe 196F
- Indian reserve
- Tsʼu Kʼadhe Túe Indian Reserve No. 196F
- Location in Alberta
- First Nation: Smith's Landing
- Treaty: 8
- Country: Canada
- Province: Alberta
- Specialized municipality: Wood Buffalo

Area
  - Total: 231.6 ha (572 acres)
- Time zone: UTC−06:00 (Alberta Time)

Tsʼu Kʼadhe Túe 196F is an Indian reserve of the Smith's Landing First Nation in Alberta, located within the Regional Municipality of Wood Buffalo.
