= Collin Lake 223 =

Coordinates: 59°35′10″N 110°10′42″W

- Indian reserve
- Collin Lake Indian Reserve No. 223
- Location in Alberta
- First Nation: Mikisew Cree
- Treaty: 8
- Country: Canada
- Province: Alberta
- Specialized municipality: Wood Buffalo

Area
  - Total: 36.4 ha (90 acres)
- Time zone: UTC−06:00 (Alberta Time)

Collin Lake 223 is an Indian reserve of the Mikisew Cree First Nation in Alberta, located within the Regional Municipality of Wood Buffalo.
