= Tthebacha Náre 196A =

Coordinates: 59°59′30″N 111°51′53″W

Tthebacha Náre 196 Border Town
- Indian reserve
- Tthebacha Náre Indian Reserve No. 196
- Boundaries of Tthebacha Náre 196

- Location in Alberta
- First Nation: Smith's Landing
- Treaty: 8
- Country: Canada
- Province: Alberta
- Specialized municipality: Wood Buffalo

Area
  - Total: 397.2 ha (982 acres)

Population (2016)
  - Total: 28
  - Density: 7.0/km^{2} (18/sq mi)
- Time zone: UTC−06:00 (Alberta Time)

Tthebacha Náre 196, also known as Border Town, is an Indian reserve of the Smith's Landing First Nation in Alberta, located within the Regional Municipality of Wood Buffalo. In the 2016 Canadian Census, it recorded a population of 28 living in 8 of its 16 total private dwellings.

The reserve's northern boundary is the 60th parallel north, which divides Alberta from the Northwest Territories. On the other side is the town of Fort Smith.
