= Sandy Point 221 =

Coordinates: 58°56′28″N 110°44′17″W

- Indian reserve
- Sandy Point Indian Reserve No. 221
- Boundaries of Sandy Point 221

- Location in Alberta
- First Nation: Mikisew Cree
- Treaty: 8
- Country: Canada
- Province: Alberta
- Specialized municipality: Wood Buffalo

Area
  - Total: 204 ha (500 acres)
- Time zone: UTC−06:00 (Alberta Time)

Sandy Point 221 is an Indian reserve in Alberta. It is located 248 kilometres (154 mi) northeast of Fort McMurray. It is at an elevation of 212 metres (696 ft).
