= Kʼı Kué 196D =

Coordinates: 59°55′16″N 111°28′09″W

Kʼı Kué 196D Birch Lake
- Indian reserve
- Kʼı Kué Indian Reserve No. 196D
- Boundaries of K’ı Kué 196D

- Location in Alberta
- First Nation: Smith's Landing
- Treaty: 8
- Country: Canada
- Province: Alberta
- Specialized municipality: Wood Buffalo

Area
  - Total: 484.3 ha (1,197 acres)
- Time zone: UTC−06:00 (Alberta Time)

Kʼı Kué 196D, also known as Birch Lake, is an Indian reserve of the Smith's Landing First Nation in Alberta, located within the Regional Municipality of Wood Buffalo.
