= Old Fort 217 =

Coordinates: 58°25′00″N 111°28′58″W

- Indian reserve
- Old Fort Indian Reserve No. 217
- Boundaries of Old Fort 217

- Location in Alberta
- First Nation: Mikisew Cree
- Treaty: 8
- Country: Canada
- Province: Alberta
- Specialized municipality: Wood Buffalo

Area
  - Total: 1,509 ha (3,730 acres)

Population (2016)
  - Total: 0
  - Density: 0.0/km^{2} (0.0/sq mi)
- Time zone: UTC−06:00 (Alberta Time)

Old Fort 217 is an Indian reserve of the Mikisew Cree First Nation in Alberta, located within Regional Municipality of Wood Buffalo. In the 2016 Canadian Census, it is unpopulated. It is located 188 kilometres (117 mi) north of Fort McMurray, at an elevation of 214 metres (702 ft). In 2001, five people lived here.
