= Fort McKay 174 =

Coordinates: 57°10′10″N 111°36′05″W

- Indian reserve
- Fort McKay Indian Reserve No. 174
- Location in Alberta
- First Nation: Fort McKay
- Treaty: 8
- Country: Canada
- Province: Alberta
- Specialized municipality: Wood Buffalo

Area
  - Total: 3,106.7 ha (7,677 acres)
- Time zone: UTC−06:00 (Alberta Time)

Fort McKay 174 is an Indian reserve of the Fort McKay First Nation in Alberta, located within the Regional Municipality of Wood Buffalo.
