= Buckton Creek =

Stream in Alberta, Canada

Coordinates: 58.30023°N 111.91869°W

Buckton Creek is a stream in Alberta, Canada.

Buckton Creek has the name of A. Scott Buckton, a DLS surveyor.

== See also ==
- List of rivers of Alberta
