= Peace Point 222 =

Coordinates: 59°08′14″N 112°25′53″W

- Indian reserve
- Peace Point Indian Reserve No. 222
- Location in Alberta
- First Nation: Mikisew Cree
- Treaty: 8
- Country: Canada
- Province: Alberta
- Improvement district: 24

Area
  - Total: 518 ha (1,280 acres)
- Time zone: UTC−06:00 (Alberta Time)

Peace Point 222 is an Indian reserve of the Mikisew Cree First Nation in Alberta, located within Improvement District No. 24 (Wood Buffalo National Park).
