= Dog Head 218 =

Coordinates: 58°42′39″N 111°10′59″W

- Indian reserve
- Dog Head Indian Reserve No. 218
- Location in Alberta
- First Nation: Mikisew Cree
- Treaty: 8
- Country: Canada
- Province: Alberta
- Specialized municipality: Wood Buffalo

Area
  - Total: 34.8 ha (86 acres)

Population (2016)
  - Total: 99
  - Density: 280/km^{2} (740/sq mi)
- Time zone: UTC−06:00 (Alberta Time)

Dog Head 218 is an Indian reserve of the Mikisew Cree First Nation in Alberta, located within the Regional Municipality of Wood Buffalo. In the 2016 Canadian Census, it recorded a population of 99 living in 39 of its 49 total private dwellings.
