= Division No. 16, Alberta =

Census division in Canada

Coordinates: 56°44′24″N 111°25′48″W

Division No. 16
- Census division in Alberta
- Country: Canada
- Province: Alberta

Area
  - Total: 97,255 km^{2} (37,550 sq mi)

Population (2021)
  - Total: 74,543
  - Density: 0.76647/km^{2} (1.9851/sq mi)

Division No. 16 is a census division in Alberta, Canada. It is located in the northeast portion of northern Alberta and surrounds the Urban Service Area of Fort McMurray.

== Census subdivisions ==
The following census subdivisions (municipalities or municipal equivalents) are located within Alberta's Division No. 16.

- Specialized municipalities
  - Regional Municipality of Wood Buffalo
    - Urban service areas
      - Fort McMurray
- Improvement districts
  - Improvement District No. 24 (Wood Buffalo National Park)
- Indian reserves
  - Allison Bay 219
  - Charles Lake 225
  - Chipewyan 201
  - Chipewyan 201A
  - Chipewyan 201B
  - Chipewyan 201C
  - Chipewyan 201D
  - Chipewyan 201E
  - Chipewyan 201F
  - Chipewyan 201G
  - Clearwater 175
  - Collin Lake 223
  - Cornwall Lake 224
  - Devil's Gate 220
  - Dog Head 218
  - Fort McKay 174
  - Gregoire Lake 176
  - Gregoire Lake 176A
  - Janvier 194
  - Namur Lake 174B
  - Namur River 174A
  - Old Fort 217
  - Sandy Point 221
  - Thabacha Náre 196A
  - Thebathi 196
- Indian settlements
  - Fort Mackay

== Demographics ==
Historical population
Year	Pop.	±%
1991	37,693	—
1996	36,494	−3.2%
2001	42,971	+17.7%
2006	53,080	+23.5%
2011	67,516	+27.2%
2016	73,988	+9.6%
2021	74,543	+0.8%

In the 2021 Census of Population conducted by Statistics Canada, Division No. 16 had a population of 74,543 living in 26,592 of its 31,233 total private dwellings, a change of 0.8% from its 2016 population of 73,988. With a land area of 94,072.31 km^{2} (36,321.52 sq mi), it had a population density of 0.8/km^{2} (2.1/sq mi) in 2021.

== See also ==
- List of census divisions of Alberta
- List of communities in Alberta
