= Namur River 174A =

Coordinates: 57°29′25″N 112°31′39″W

- Indian reserve
- Namur River Indian Reserve No. 174A
- Location in Alberta
- First Nation: Fort McKay
- Treaty: 8
- Country: Canada
- Province: Alberta
- Specialized municipality: Wood Buffalo

Area
  - Total: 4,614.9 ha (11,404 acres)
- Time zone: UTC−06:00 (Alberta Time)

Namur River 174A is an Indian reserve of the Fort McKay First Nation in Alberta, located within the Regional Municipality of Wood Buffalo. It is 65 kilometres northwest of Fort McMurray.
