= Fort Fitzgerald =

Fitzgerald Fort Fitzgerald Smith's Landing
- Hamlet / locality
- Location of Fitzgerald in Alberta
- Coordinates: 59°51′35″N 111°36′15″W
- Country: Canada
- Province: Alberta
- Region: Northern Alberta
- Census division: 16
- Specialized municipality: RM of Wood Buffalo

Government
  - Mayor: Sandy Bowman
  - Governing body: Wood Buffalo Municipal Council: Mike Allen; Ty Brandt; Lance Bussieres; Luana Bussieres; Don Scott; Jennifer Vardy; Kendrick Cardinal; Greg "Cowboy" Marcel; Stu Wigle; Kyle Vandecasteyen
- Elevation: 200 m (660 ft)

Population (2021)
  - Total: 6
- Time zone: UTC−06:00 (Alberta Time)
- Postal code: T0V 1A0
- Area code: +1-867
- Website: RM of Wood Buffalo page

Fitzgerald, also known as Fort Fitzgerald and originally Smith's Landing, is an unincorporated community in northern Alberta, Canada. The hamlet portion of the community (Fort Fitzgerald) is within the Regional Municipality of Wood Buffalo, while the locality portion (Fitzgerald) is Thebathi 196. It is 15.4 km (9.6 mi) south of the Northwest Territories border and 23 km (14 mi) southeast of Fort Smith.

== History ==
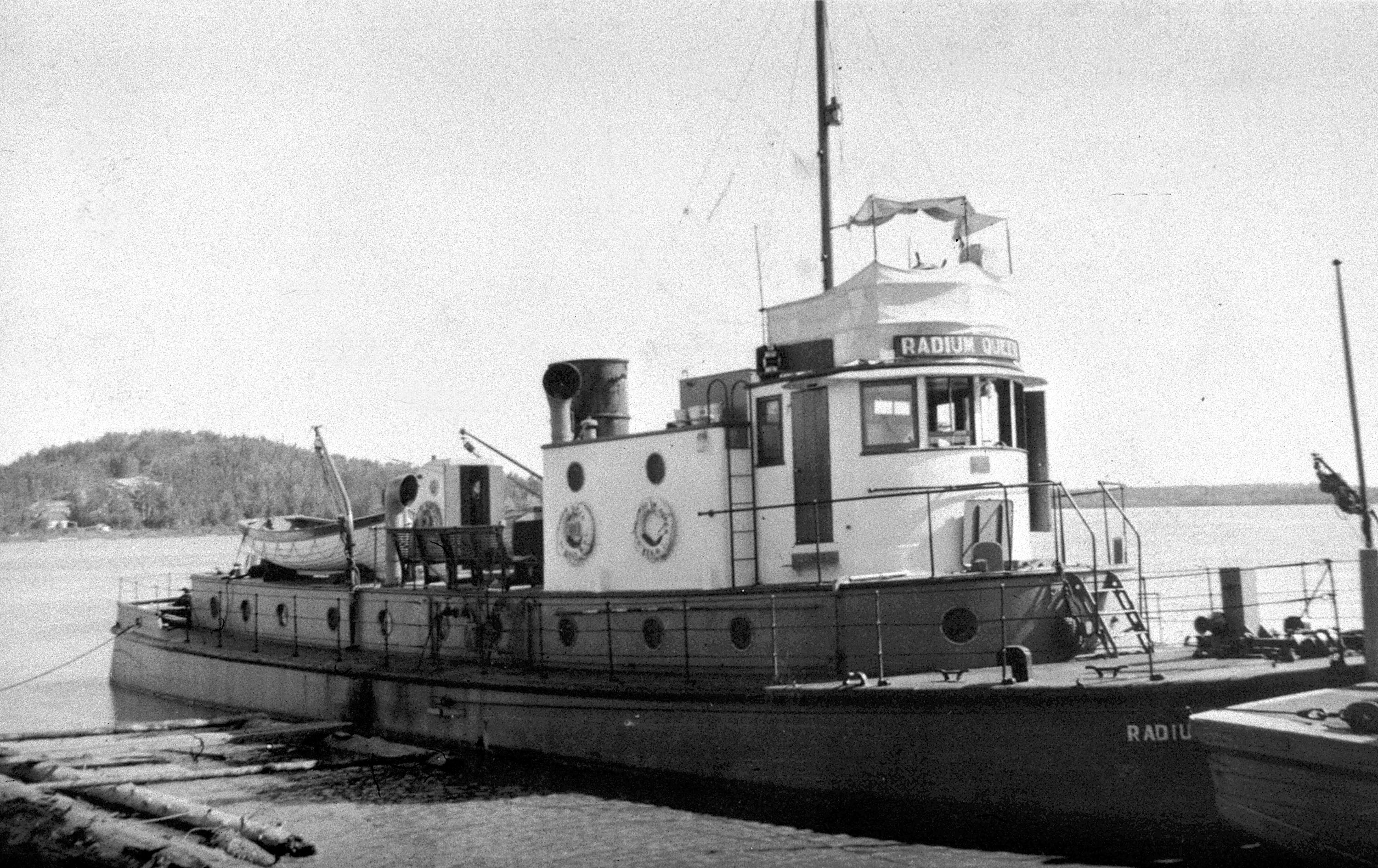
The Radium Queen, and other tugboats, pushed barges to and from the portage at Fort Fitzgerald to the railhead at Waterways, Alberta.

Prior to the extension of railway service to Hay River, Northwest Territories, on Great Slave Lake, all cargo being shipped to or from the north had to be portaged from Fitzgerald to Fort Smith, to avoid four impassable rapids. The community was known as Smith's Landing until 1915 when it was renamed Fort Fitzgerald after the late Francis Joseph Fitzgerald.

== Demographics ==
Population history of Fort Fitzgerald
Year	Pop.	±%
1941	210	—
1951	155	−26.2%
1956	101	−34.8%
1961	149	+47.5%
1966	68	−54.4%
1971	27	−60.3%
1981	27	+0.0%
1986	16	−40.7%
1991E	26	+62.5%
Source: Statistics Canada

Fort Fitzgerald had a population of 6 people in the 2021 Regional Municipality of Wood Buffalo census. The population living in Thebathi 196 in the federal 2016 census was 20, a 33.3% decrease from the 2011 census which had a population of 30.

== Infrastructure ==
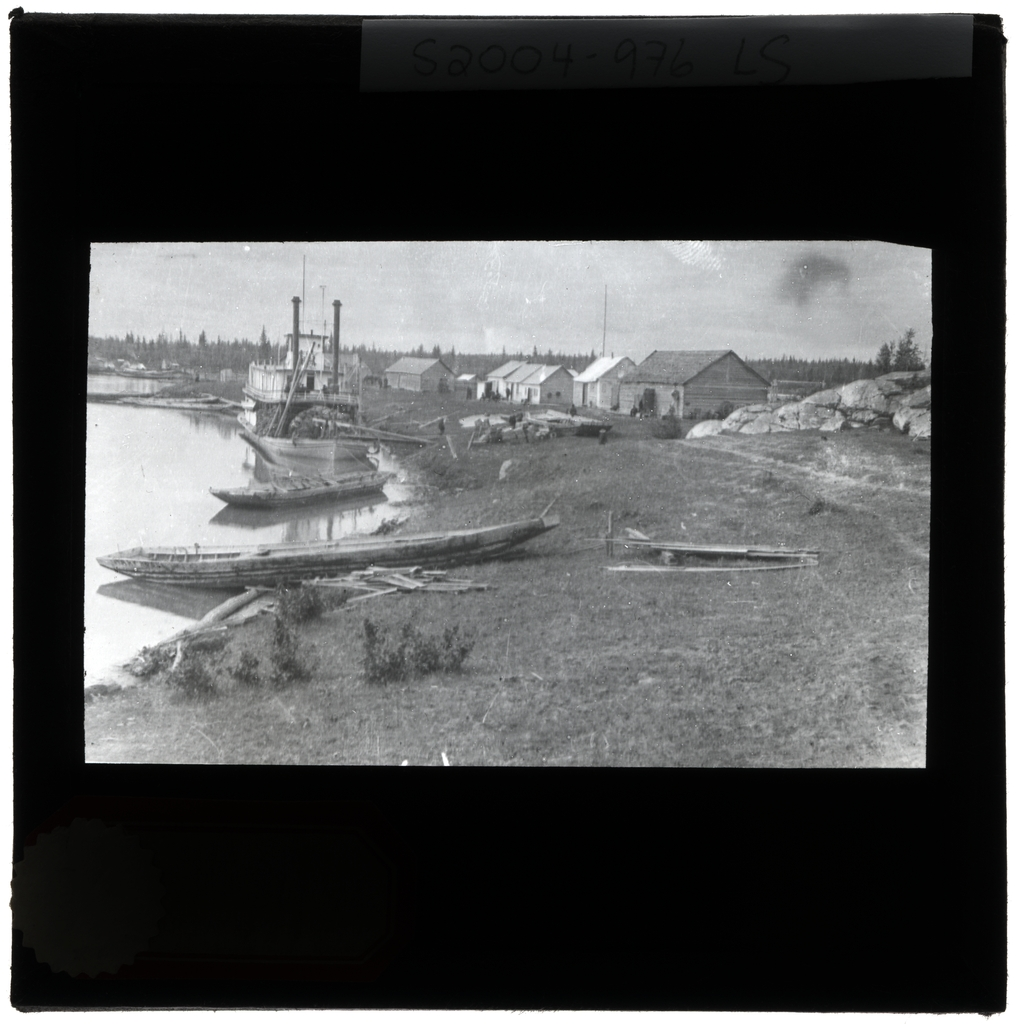
Smith's Landing, circa 1910

Most of the community's services are provided from Fort Smith, including fire, law enforcement, health care, social services, and telecommunications. Law enforcement is part of the Royal Canadian Mounted Police 'G division' in the Northwest Territories. Since telecommunication services, including cellular and internet, are from Fort Smith, Northwest Territories, the area code is 867, although Fitzgerald is located in what would be area code 780 in Alberta.

An all-weather road, named Hay Camp Road, links Fort Smith and Hay Camp through Fitzgerald.

== See also ==
- List of communities in Alberta
  - List of localities in Alberta
