= Charles Lake 225 =

Coordinates: 59°53′57″N 110°35′25″W

- Indian reserve
- Charles Lake Indian Reserve No. 225
- Location in Alberta
- First Nation: Mikisew Cree
- Treaty: 8
- Country: Canada
- Province: Alberta
- Specialized municipality: Wood Buffalo

Area
  - Total: 64.5 ha (159 acres)
- Time zone: UTC−06:00 (Alberta Time)

Charles Lake 225 is an Indian reserve of the Mikisew Cree First Nation in Alberta, located within Regional Municipality of Wood Buffalo.
