= Fort McKay 174D =

Coordinates: 57°12′21″N 111°38′57″W

- Indian reserve
- Fort McKay Indian Reserve No. 174D
- Location in Alberta
- First Nation: Fort McKay
- Treaty: 8
- Country: Canada
- Province: Alberta
- Specialized municipality: Wood Buffalo

Area
  - Total: 660.8 ha (1,633 acres)
- Time zone: UTC−06:00 (Alberta Time)

Fort McKay 174D is an Indian reserve of the Fort McKay First Nation in Alberta, located within the Regional Municipality of Wood Buffalo.
