= Winefred Lake 194B =

Coordinates: 55°35′11″N 110°30′59″W

- Indian reserve
- Winefred Lake Indian Reserve No. 194B
- Location in Alberta
- First Nation: Chipewyan Prairie
- Treaty: 8
- Country: Canada
- Province: Alberta
- Specialized municipality: Wood Buffalo

Area
  - Total: 450 ha (1,100 acres)
- Time zone: UTC−06:00 (Alberta Time)

Winefred Lake 194B is an Indian reserve of the Chipewyan Prairie First Nation in Alberta, located within the Regional Municipality of Wood Buffalo.
