= Fort McKay 174C =

Coordinates: 57°21′00″N 111°23′05″W

- Indian reserve
- Fort McKay Indian Reserve No. 174C
- Location in Alberta
- First Nation: Fort McKay
- Treaty: 8
- Country: Canada
- Province: Alberta
- Specialized municipality: Wood Buffalo

Area
  - Total: 3,381.4 ha (8,356 acres)
- Time zone: UTC−06:00 (Alberta Time)

Fort McKay 174C is an Indian reserve of the Fort McKay First Nation in Alberta, located within the Regional Municipality of Wood Buffalo.
