= Devil's Gate 220 =

Coordinates: 58°48′30″N 111°13′04″W

- Indian reserve
- Devil's Gate Indian Reserve No. 220
- Location in Alberta
- First Nation: Mikisew Cree
- Treaty: 8
- Country: Canada
- Province: Alberta
- Specialized municipality: Wood Buffalo

Area
  - Total: 819.1 ha (2,024 acres)
- Time zone: UTC−06:00 (Alberta Time)

Devil's Gate 220 is a First Nation reserve of the Mikisew Cree First Nation in Alberta, located within the Regional Municipality of Wood Buffalo. It is 10 kilometres north of Fort Chipewyan.
