= Cowper Lake 194A =

Coordinates: 55°55′08″N 110°27′42″W

- Indian reserve
- Cowper Lake Indian Reserve No. 194A
- Location in Alberta
- First Nation: Chipewyan Prairie
- Treaty: 8
- Country: Canada
- Province: Alberta
- Specialized municipality: Wood Buffalo

Area
  - Total: 143 ha (350 acres)
- Time zone: UTC−06:00 (Alberta Time)

Cowper Lake 194A is an Indian reserve of the Chipewyan Prairie First Nation in Alberta, located within the Regional Municipality of Wood Buffalo.
