= Smith's Landing First Nation =

Canadian First Nation

- Band No. 477
- Tthëbátthı́ dënesųłı̨ne
- People: Dënesųłı̨né
- Treaty: Treaty 8
- Headquarters: Fort Smith
- Territory: Northwest Territories

Land
- Other reserves: Ɂejëre Kʼelnı Kuę́ 196I; Hokédhe Kué 196E; Kʼı Kué 196D; Łı̨ Dezé 196C; Tthebacha Náre 196A; Tthebatthıe 196; Tsʼu Kʼadhe Kué 196F; Tsʼu Nedhé 196H; Tsʼu Kué 196G; Tthejëre Ghaı̨lı̨ 196B
- Land area: 100.497 km^{2} (38.802 sq mi)

Population (2019)
- On reserve: 163
- Off reserve: 204
- Total population: 367

Government
- Chief: Thaidene Paulette
- Council size: 5

Tribal Council
- Akaitcho Territory Government

Website
- slfn196.com

Smith's Landing First Nation (Chipewyan: Tthëbátthı́ dënesųłı̨ne) is a band government headquartered at Fort Smith, Northwest Territories, Canada. Members of the band call themselves, in the Dene Suline language, the Thebati Dene Suhne.

== Media ==
The film Honor of the Crown, directed by Tom Radford, documents the Thebatthi (Chipeweyan) people's successful battle to get the Canadian government to honor its obligations according to an 1899 treaty. Led by François Paulette and his brother Chief Jerry Paulette, the band reclaimed nine tracts of land and $33 million in compensation, becoming Alberta's 44th First Nation.

== History ==
On June 21, 2024, Smith's Landing First Nation signed a memorandum of agreement to collaborate with three other Fort Smith governments in improving the lives of constituents, as part of the Collaborative Leadership Initiative (CLI). In September 2024, they became a signatory of the Buffalo Treaty.

== Indian reserves ==
The band has ten reserves located in Alberta. These are:

- Ɂejëre Kʼelnı Kuę́ 196I (Hay Camp)
- Hokédhe Kué 196E (Myers Lake)
- Kʼı Kué 196D (Birch Lake)
- Łı̨ Dezé 196C (Dog River)
- Tthebacha Náre 196A (Border Town)
- Tthebatthıe 196 (Fort Fitzgerald)
- Tsʼu Kʼadhe Kué 196F (Leland Lake)
- Tsʼu Nedhé 196H (Pine Lake)
- Tsʼu Kué 196G (Charles Lake)
- Tthejëre Ghaı̨lı̨ 196B (Salt River)
- Tsʼu Kué 196G is an Indian reserve of the Smith's Landing First Nation in Alberta, located within the Regional Municipality of Wood Buffalo.
