= Namur Lake 174B =

Coordinates: 57°25′07″N 112°37′41″W

- Indian reserve
- Namur Lake Indian Reserve No. 174B
- Location in Alberta
- First Nation: Fort McKay
- Treaty: 8
- Country: Canada
- Province: Alberta
- Specialized municipality: Wood Buffalo

Area
  - Total: 3,122.2 ha (7,715 acres)
- Time zone: UTC−06:00 (Alberta Time)

Namur Lake 174B is an Indian reserve of the Fort McKay First Nation in Alberta, located within the Regional Municipality of Wood Buffalo. It is 105 kilometres northwest of Fort McMurray.
