= Allison Bay 219 =

Coordinates: 58°46′38″N 111°01′36″W

- Indian reserve
- Allison Bay Indian Reserve No. 219
- Location in Alberta
- First Nation: Mikisew Cree
- Treaty: 8
- Country: Canada
- Province: Alberta
- Specialized municipality: Wood Buffalo

Area
  - Total: 1,861 ha (4,600 acres)

Population (2016)
  - Total: 127
  - Density: 6.82/km^{2} (17.7/sq mi)
- Time zone: UTC−06:00 (Alberta Time)

Allison Bay 219 is an Indian reserve of the Mikisew Cree First Nation in Alberta, located within Regional Municipality of Wood Buffalo. It is 3 kilometres northeast of Fort Chipewyan. In the 2016 Canadian Census, it recorded a population of 127 living in 38 of its 46 total private dwellings.
