= Peeaysees First Nation =

The Peeaysees Band (also known as the Lac la Biche Band no. 129) was an enfranchised Indigenous First Nation's band of mixed-raced, Woodland Cree people's in the area of Lac La Biche, Alberta. Signed to Treaty 6 on September 9, 1876 at Fort Pitt by Chief Peeaysees, the band received annuity payments till 1885 when a majority of the band members were discharged from the treaty as a repercussion for involvement in the North-West Rebellion. After 1911 all traces of the band disappeared.

== Historical Peeaysees Band ==
Chief Peeaysees along with his councilors Mahchahmewis and Isaac Cardinal, signed Treaty 6 on September 9, 1876 at Fort Pitt. The Peeaysees Band traditional lands were located at Lac La Biche, which the Cree historically called Wâwâskesiwisâkahikan or Elk Lake.

== Involvement in the North-West Rebellion ==
Years following the signing of Treaty 6 several of the First Nation bands were angered and disillusioned by what they considered to be dishonest and neglect by the government. Insufficient support, resources and provisions of relief assistance left many bands on the brink of starvation. In 1883 several Chiefs of Treaty 6 wrote an open letter airing their grievances and frustrations to Minister of the Interior, Sir John A. Macdonald, who was also Canada's prime minister at the time.

After years of broken promises, in spring of 1885 groups of First Nation's, Metis and Half-Breed's began a resistance against the government in the North-West aptly titled the North-West Rebellion. In April 1885, also disillusioned by the governments broken promises, Chief Peeaysees and members of his Band traveled to Battle River to join contemporary Big Bear in the Rebellion.

== Post Rebellion and Discharge from Treaty ==
After the defeat of Indian, Métis and Half-Breed rebels by the Canadians in 1885, Hayter Reed, assistant Indian Commissioner prepared ea memorandum of sweeping changes to the management of Treaty Indians.

Examples of Reed's memorandum consisted of:

1. Abolishing tribal system of rebel tribes in compatible with treaty
2. No annuity money paid to rebel individuals/bands.
3. Pass System to leave the reserve
4. All half-breeds, members of rebel, although not shewn to have taken any active part in the rebellion should have their names erased from the pay-sheets

Following this annuities and resources for the Peeaysees band were cut off by Indian Affairs for their involvement with the North-West Rebellion. Many of the band members were forced to discharge and enfranchise from Treaty due to Rebellion involvement, starvation, lack of reserve lands, etc. Hayter Reed also encouraged Indian agents to induce families to be discharged from treaty in order to produce cost savings for Indian Affairs.

Following the discharge many members of the Peeaysees band were eligible for Half-Breed scrip due to living in the territory before Rupertsland sold to Canada. In one swoop a majority of Peeaysees band members relinquished right to their reserve lands, Indian title to Treaty and thus became Métis overnight. This tactic of Treaty Discharge by Indian Affairs did not only happened to the Peeaysees Band but also to Passpasschase, Michel Band and many other First Nation bands in and outside treaty 6.

== Population ==
Membership for the band at one point exceeded 300 members but in 1890 the band dwindled down to only 15 members. After 1911 all traces of the Lac Lac Biche Band no. 129 (formerly Peeaysees) disappeared from the Department of Indian Affairs year end reports. The remaining band members either died, enfranchised or were transferred to another band. With no more members the Lac La Biche Band no. 129 (formerly Peeaysees) became defunct.

Peeaysees Band Paylist Annuity Totals - 1879
POPULATION	MEN	WOMEN	DEPENDANTS
308	48	68	192

== Reserve lands ==
In 1881 the band's reserve lands were interned to be at the southern extremity of Big Bay in Lac La Biche. The terms of Treaty 6 gave every family of five living on the reserve one square mile. Smaller families received land according to the size of their family. In 1879 the population of the band exceed 300 members with an estimated 30 families. The Peeaysees Band reserve size would have been an estimated 10,000 to 20,000 acres but Indian Affairs never provided the reserve lands.

In 1999 descendants of the band launch a land claim toward the federal government.

== Chief Peeaysees ==
Chief Peeaysees (also known as Francois Desjarlais) was born in 1824 at Beaver River. his father was the son of Okimaskwew and his mother was the daughter of Lizette Muskegon, a swampy Cree Indian. He also had 10 children in his lifetime, one which died as an infant. Peeaysees was the Chief of his band for 9 years following its signing of treaty 6. After his participation with the North-West Rebellion Indian Affairs did a population survey of the Peeaysees Band in which their notes state "Chief hiding, fearing justice". Suspicious of amnesty offered following the execution of Louis Riel, Peeaysees fled south and never returned to Lac La Biche again. In the winter of 1899, former Chief Peeaysees died in obscurity in Battleford, Saskatchewan
