= Tthebatthıe 196 =

Coordinates: 59°52′06″N 111°40′33″W

Tthebatthıe 196 Thebathi 196 Fitzgerald 196
- Indian reserve
- Tthebatthıe Indian Reserve No. 196
- Location in Alberta
- First Nation: Smith's Landing
- Treaty: 8
- Country: Canada
- Province: Alberta
- Specialized municipality: Wood Buffalo
- Community: Fitzgerald

Area
  - Total: 6,524.0 ha (16,121 acres)

Population (2016)
  - Total: 20
  - Density: 0.31/km^{2} (0.79/sq mi)
- Time zone: UTC−06:00 (Alberta Time)

Tthebatthıe 196, formerly known as Thebathi 196 and Fitzgerald 196, is an Indian reserve of the Smith's Landing First Nation in Alberta, located within the Regional Municipality of Wood Buffalo.
