= Cold Lake 149C =

Coordinates: 54°43′19″N 110°02′08″W

- Indian reserve
- Cold Lake Indian Reserve No. 149C
- Location in Alberta
- First Nation: Cold Lake
- Treaty: 6
- Country: Canada
- Province: Alberta
- Municipal district: Bonnyville

Area
  - Total: 2,023.5 ha (5,000 acres)
- Time zone: UTC−06:00 (Alberta Time)

Cold Lake 149C is an Indian reserve of the Cold Lake First Nations in Alberta, located within the Municipal District of Bonnyville No. 87.
