= Regional Municipality of Wood Buffalo =

Municipality in Alberta, Canada

Wood Buffalo
- Specialized municipality
- Regional Municipality of Wood Buffalo
- Logo

- Location within Alberta
- Country: Canada
- Province: Alberta
- Region: Northern Alberta
- Planning region: Lower Athabasca
- Specialized municipality: April 1, 1995
- Name change: August 14, 1996
- Administrative office: Fort McMurray

Government
  - Mayor: Sandy Bowman
  - Governing body: Wood Buffalo Municipal Council: Mike Allen; Ty Brandt; Lance Bussieres; Luana Bussieres; Don Scott; Jennifer Vardy; Kendrick Cardinal; Greg "Cowboy" Marcel; Stu Wigle; Kyle Vandecasteyen
  - CAO: Andrew Boutilier

Area (2021)
  - Land: 60,843.88 km^{2} (23,491.95 sq mi)

Population (2021)
  - Total: 82,400
  - Density: 1.2/km^{2} (3.1/sq mi)
  - Municipal census (2021): 75,555
- Time zone: UTC−06:00 (Alberta Time)
- Website: rmwb.ca

The Regional Municipality of Wood Buffalo (abbreviated RMWB) is a specialized municipality in northeast Alberta, Canada. It is the largest regional municipality in Canada by area, covering 105,650.88 square kilometres (40,792.03 sq mi); this number includes the Wood Buffalo National Park of Canada. It is home to oil sand deposits known as the Athabasca oil sands.

== History ==
The Municipality of Wood Buffalo was incorporated as a specialized municipality on April 1, 1995 as a result of the amalgamation of the City of Fort McMurray and Improvement District No. 143. Specialized municipality status was granted to provide "for the unique needs of a municipality including a large urban centre and a large rural territory with a small population." The Municipality of Wood Buffalo subsequently changed its name to the Regional Municipality of Wood Buffalo on August 14, 1996.

=== June 2013 floods ===
By June 12, 2013, after many days of heavy rain, the Regional Municipality of Wood Buffalo declared a state of emergency. They organized evacuations from some areas and placed others under boil water advisories as local waterways, such as the Hangingstone River, rose to dangerously elevated levels 30 kilometres (19 mi) south of Fort McMurray, causing the closure of Highway 63.

=== "The Beast" Horse River Wildfire (2016) ===
From May 3, 2016 on, over 80,000 people were affected by evacuations, by May 3 at 6:49 pm, the entirety of Fort McMurray and surrounding areas were placed under a mandatory evacuation. making it Alberta's largest evacuation for a wildfire.

=== April 2020 floods ===
By April 30, 2020, after a 25-kilometre-long ice jam formed in the Athabasca River, flooding the northern Alberta city's downtown and surrounding areas, and forcing 13,000 people from their home, Fort McMurray's spring flood caused more than $520 million in insured damage, according to new numbers from the Insurance Bureau of Canada. That flood damage was followed by $1.2 billion in damage from a hailstorm in Calgary, Airdrie and Rocky View County, flooding in Edmonton in July and another storm in Calgary on July 24.

== Geography ==
The Regional Municipality (RM) of Wood Buffalo is in the northeast corner of the province of Alberta. It borders the province of Saskatchewan to the east; the Northwest Territories to the north; Improvement District No. 24 (Wood Buffalo National Park), Mackenzie County, and the Municipal District of Opportunity No. 17 to the west; and Athabasca County and the Municipal District of Bonnyville No. 87 to the south. The Athabasca River meanders northward through the central portion of the RM of Wood Buffalo before emptying into Lake Athabasca. Some of its water bodies include Christina Lake, Gardiner Lakes, Garson Lake, Gipsy Lake, Gordon Lake, Gregoire Lake, McClelland Lake, Namur Lake, Richardson Lake, and Winefred Lake (also partially within Lac La Biche County and the Municipal District of Bonnyville No. 87). Discharging northward from Lake Athabasca is Riviere des Rochers, which at its confluence with the Peace River becomes the Slave River. The Slave River forms much of the RM of Wood Buffalo's boundary with Improvement District No. 24 north of the confluence. Land formations include the Birch Mountains northwest of Fort McKay, Fort Hills north of Fort McKay, and Thickwood Hills west of Fort McMurray. A portion of the Peace-Athabasca Delta is also within the RM of Wood Buffalo.

=== Communities and localities ===
The following urban municipalities are surrounded by the Regional Municipality of Wood Buffalo:

Cities

- none

Towns

- none

Villages

- none

Summer villages

- none

The following hamlets are located within the Regional Municipality of Wood Buffalo:

Hamlets

- Anzac
- Conklin
- Fort Fitzgerald
- Fort Chipewyan
- Fort McKay
- Fort McMurray (urban service area)
- Gregoire Lake Estates
- Janvier South
- Saprae Creek

The following localities are located within the Regional Municipality of Wood Buffalo:

- Almac Subdivision
- Beaver Lake-Young's Beach
- Bechtel Syncrude Camp
- Berdinskies
- Berny
- Big Eddy
- Billos
- Bitumount
- Brièreville
- Chard
- Charron
- Cheecham
- Christina Crossing
- Corbetts
- Devenish
- Dog Head
- Draper
- Egg Lake
- Embarras
- Embarras Portage
- Fitzgerald
- Fitzgerald 196
- Fitzgerald Settlement
- Fort Smith Settlement
- Gourin
- Grandin
- Improvement District No.143
- Kenny Woods
- Kinosis
- Le Goff
- Leismer
- Lenarthur
- Lynton
- Maloy
- Mariana Lake
- Mildred Lake
- Old Fort
- Pelican Settlement
- Pingle
- Point Brule
- Quigley
- Rossian
- Sandy Rapids
- Tar Island
- Waterways
- Willow Trail
- Wolyn

The following settlements are within the Regional Municipality of Wood Buffalo:

- Chipewyan
- Fitzgerald (Smith Landing)
- Janvier South
- Mariana
- McKay
- St. Bruno Farm (also partially within Improvement District No. 24)

First Nations have the following Indian reserves within the Regional Municipality of Wood Buffalo:

- Allison Bay 219
- Charles Lake 225
- Chipewyan 201
- Chipewyan 201A
- Chipewyan 201B
- Chipewyan 201C
- Chipewyan 201D
- Chipewyan 201E
- Chipewyan 201F
- Chipewyan 201G
- Clearwater 175
- Collin Lake 223
- Cornwall Lake 224
- Cowper Lake 194A
- Devil's Gate 220
- Dog Head 218
- Fort McKay 174
- Fort McKay 174C
- Fort McKay 174D
- Gregoire Lake 176
- Hokédhe Kué 196E
- House River Indian Cemetery 178
- Janvier 194
- Kʼı Kué 196D
- Łı̨ Dezé 196C
- Namur Lake 174B
- Namur River 174A
- Old Fort 217
- Sandy Point 221
- Tthebacha Náre 196A
- Thebathi 196
- Tsʼu Kʼadhe Kué 196F
- Tsu Túe 196G
- Winefred Lake 194B

=== Hydrology ===
The Regional Municipality of Wood Buffalo (RMWB) is in the lower basin of the Athabasca River watershed and Fort McMurray is the largest community on the banks of the river. (Note: The Athabasca River originates in Jasper National Park. It is fed by the Athabasca Glacier within the Columbia Icefield, at an altitude of approximately 1,600 metres (5,200 ft). The river travels 1,231 km (765 mi) before discharging through the Mackenzie River system into the Arctic Ocean through the Northwest Territories. Its course is marked by rapids, impeding navigation southwest of Fort McMurray.) Local rivers include the Hangingstone River, Clearwater River and Christina River, a tributary of the Clearwater River.

The Hangingstone River drains an area of 1,070 km^{2} (413 sq mi), which is dominated by muskeg, and flows into the Clearwater River just upstream of the Athabasca River at Fort McMurray. The river often experiences high flows in the spring during snow melt, during heavy rainfall events and when ice jams occur during spring ice break. The RMWB warns citizens of the potential for sudden flash floods "especially in populated areas adjacent to the Athabasca River, Clearwater River and Christina River." Water levels have been monitored by the Water Survey of Canada since 1970 (WSC station 07CD004). During the spring months there is increased monitoring of the "Clearwater River to the south of the urban service area to provide warning of an ice break" and the "Athabasca River upper basin, local river levels, precipitation and overall weather patterns."

The Clearwater River, (Note: Clearwater river is named because of its "unspoiled, clear-water river in a pristine isolated "wilderness setting of spectacular beauty.") designated as part of the Canadian Heritage Rivers System, flows 187 km (116 mi) from its headwaters at Lloyd Lake in northwest Saskatchewan into northeast Alberta before joining the Athabasca River at Fort McMurray. "The lack of significant oil sands developments means that the Clearwater River can be used as a baseline river system to provide information on the variability and characteristics of natural systems."

== Demographics ==
Federal census population history
Year	Pop.	±%
1991	36,771	—
1996	35,213	−4.2%
2001	41,466	+17.8%
2006	51,496	+24.2%
2011	65,565	+27.3%
2016	71,594	+9.2%
2021	72,326	+1.0%
Source: Statistics Canada

=== Federal census ===
In the 2021 Census of Population conducted by Statistics Canada, the Regional Municipality of Wood Buffalo had a population of 72,326 living in 25,934 of its 30,451 total private dwellings, a change of 1% from its 2016 population of 71,594. With a land area of 60,843.88 km^{2} (23,491.95 sq mi), it had a population density of 1.2/km^{2} (3.1/sq mi) in 2021.

In the 2016 Census of Population conducted by Statistics Canada, the Regional Municipality of Wood Buffalo had a population of 71,594 living in 25,659 of its 30,713 total private dwellings, a change of 9.2% from its 2011 population of 65,565. With a land area of 61,777.65 km^{2} (23,852.48 sq mi), it had a population density of 1.2/km^{2} (3.0/sq mi) in 2016.

=== Municipal census ===
Regional Municipality of Wood Buffalo population breakdown, 2021
Component	Permanent population	Shadow population	Combined population
Urban service area (Fort McMurray)	72,917	3,089	76,006
Rural service area	2,638	27,415	30,053
Total RM of Wood Buffalo	75,555	30,053	106,059

The permanent population of the Regional Municipality (RM) of Wood Buffalo according to its 2021 municipal census is 75,555, a change of 0.7% from its 2018 municipal census permanent population of 75,009. In addition, the 2021 municipal census counted a shadow population of 30,504 non-permanent residents for a combined population of 106,059, while the 2018 municipal census counted 36,678 non-permanent residents for a combined population of 111,687.

=== Ethnicity ===
Panethnic groups in the Regional Municipality of Wood Buffalo (2001−2021)
Panethnic group	2021		2016		2011		2006		2001	
Panethnic group	Pop.	%	Pop.	%	Pop.	%	Pop.	%	Pop.	%
European (Note: Statistic includes all persons that did not make up part of a visible minority or an indigenous identity.)	44,020	61.33%	45,845	64.14%	47,020	71.72%	40,430	78.65%	33,615	81.27%
Indigenous	8,135	11.33%	6,565	9.18%	6,315	9.63%	5,365	10.44%	5,130	12.4%
Southeast Asian (Note: Statistic includes total responses of "Filipino" and "Southeast Asian" under visible minority section on census.)	6,360	8.86%	5,365	7.51%	2,790	4.26%	880	1.71%	465	1.12%
African	4,825	6.72%	4,175	5.84%	2,070	3.16%	720	1.4%	340	0.82%
South Asian	4,770	6.65%	4,980	6.97%	4,085	6.23%	1,780	3.46%	640	1.55%
Middle Eastern (Note: Statistic includes total responses of "West Asian" and "Arab" under visible minority section on census.)	1,505	2.1%	1,940	2.71%	1,215	1.85%	830	1.61%	475	1.15%
East Asian (Note: Statistic includes total responses of "Chinese", "Korean", and "Japanese" under visible minority section on census.)	865	1.21%	1,285	1.8%	845	1.29%	695	1.35%	520	1.26%
Latin American	645	0.9%	925	1.29%	1,035	1.58%	570	1.11%	75	0.18%
Other/multiracial (Note: Statistic includes total responses of "Visible minority, n.i.e." and "Multiple visible minorities" under visible minority section on census.)	650	0.91%	400	0.56%	295	0.45%	140	0.27%	105	0.25%
Total responses	71,780	99.25%	71,480	99.84%	65,565	100%	51,405	99.82%	41,360	99.74%
Total population	72,326	100%	71,594	100%	65,565	100%	51,496	100%	41,466	100%
Note: Totals greater than 100% due to multiple origin responses

=== Language ===
Mother tongue (2016)	Responses	%
English	54,020	75.5%
Tagalog	2,920	4.08%
French	1,880	2.63%
Arabic	1,270	1.78%
Gujarati	1,070	1.5%
Urdu	1,035	1.45%
Spanish	805	1.13%
Somali	730	1.02%
Amharic	455	0.64%
Punjabi	425	0.59%
Hindi	415	0.58%
Mandarin	335	0.47%

Knowledge of language (2016)	Responses	%
English	70,750	98.99%
French	5,125	7.17%
Tagalog	4,250	5.95%
Arabic	1,830	2.56%
Spanish	1,375	1.92%
Urdu	1,340	1.87%
Hindi	1,130	1.58%
Gujarati	1,130	1.58%
Somali	730	1.02%
Punjabi	640	0.9%
Mandarin	580	0.81%
Cree	535	0.75%

=== Immigration ===
Wood Buffalo is home to almost 2,000 recent immigrants (arriving between 2001 and 2006) who now make up more than 3% of the population. About 21% of these immigrants came from India, while about 10% came from each of Pakistan and the Philippines, and about 9% came from Venezuela, and about 8% from South Africa, about 6% from China, and about 3% came from Colombia.

=== Religion ===
More than 80% of residents identified as Christian at the time of the 2001 census while almost 17% indicated they had no religious affiliation. For specific denominations Statistics Canada counted 15,880 Roman Catholics (37.4%), 4,985 Anglicans (11.7%), 4,225 for the United Church of Canada (9.9%), 1,730 Pentecostals (4.1%), 1,195 Baptists (2.8%), 965 for the Salvation Army (2.3%), 900 Lutherans (2.1%), 690 Muslims (1.6%), 350 Latter-day Saints (0.8%), and 320 Presbyterians (0.8%).

== Economy ==
The Regional Municipality of Wood Buffalo is home to vast oil sand deposits, also known as the Athabasca Oil Sands, helping to make the region one of the fastest growing industrial areas in Canada.

== Attractions ==
Wood Buffalo National Park is adjacent to the Regional Municipality (RM) of Wood Buffalo to the northwest. The following provincial protected areas are also within the RM of Wood Buffalo:

- Birch Mountains Wildland Provincial Park
- Birch River Wildland Provincial Park
- Dillon River Wildland Provincial Park
- Fidler-Greywillow Wildland Provincial Park
- Gipsy Lake Wildland Provincial Park
- Grand Rapids Wildland Provincial Park
- Gregoire Lake Provincial Park
- Kazan Wildland Provincial Park
- Kitaskino Nuwenëné Wildland Provincial Park
- Marguerite River Wildland Provincial Park
- Richardson Wildland Provincial Park
- Stony Mountain Wildland Provincial Park
- Whitemud Falls Wildland Provincial Park

== Government ==
The municipality's current mayor is Sandy Bowman, who was first elected in 2021. Its first mayor upon its creation in 1995 was Guy Boutilier, who had previously been the mayor of Fort McMurray and was subsequently elected as the region's provincial MLA. Doug Faulkner served as mayor from 1997 to 2004, and Melissa Blake from 2004 to 2017.

In the Legislative Assembly of Alberta, the municipality was served by the electoral district of Fort McMurray-Wood Buffalo until 2010, when a second district, Fort McMurray-Conklin, was created due to population growth. The new riding then became Fort McMurray-Lac La Biche in 2018.

Fort McMurray-Wood Buffalo is currently represented by Tany Yao and Fort McMurray-Lac La Biche is represented by Brian Jean. Both MLAs are former members of the Wildrose Party and are current members of the United Conservative Party.

As of 2016, the municipality is located in the federal electoral district of Fort McMurray—Cold Lake. The riding has been represented in the House of Commons of Canada by former UCP MLA for Fort McMurray-Lac La Biche Laila Goodridge of the Conservative Party of Canada since 2021.

== See also ==
- List of communities in Alberta
- List of specialized municipalities in Alberta
