= Wood Buffalo National Park =

National park in Alberta and Northwest Territories, Canada

- Parc national Wood Buffalo
- IUCN category II (national park)
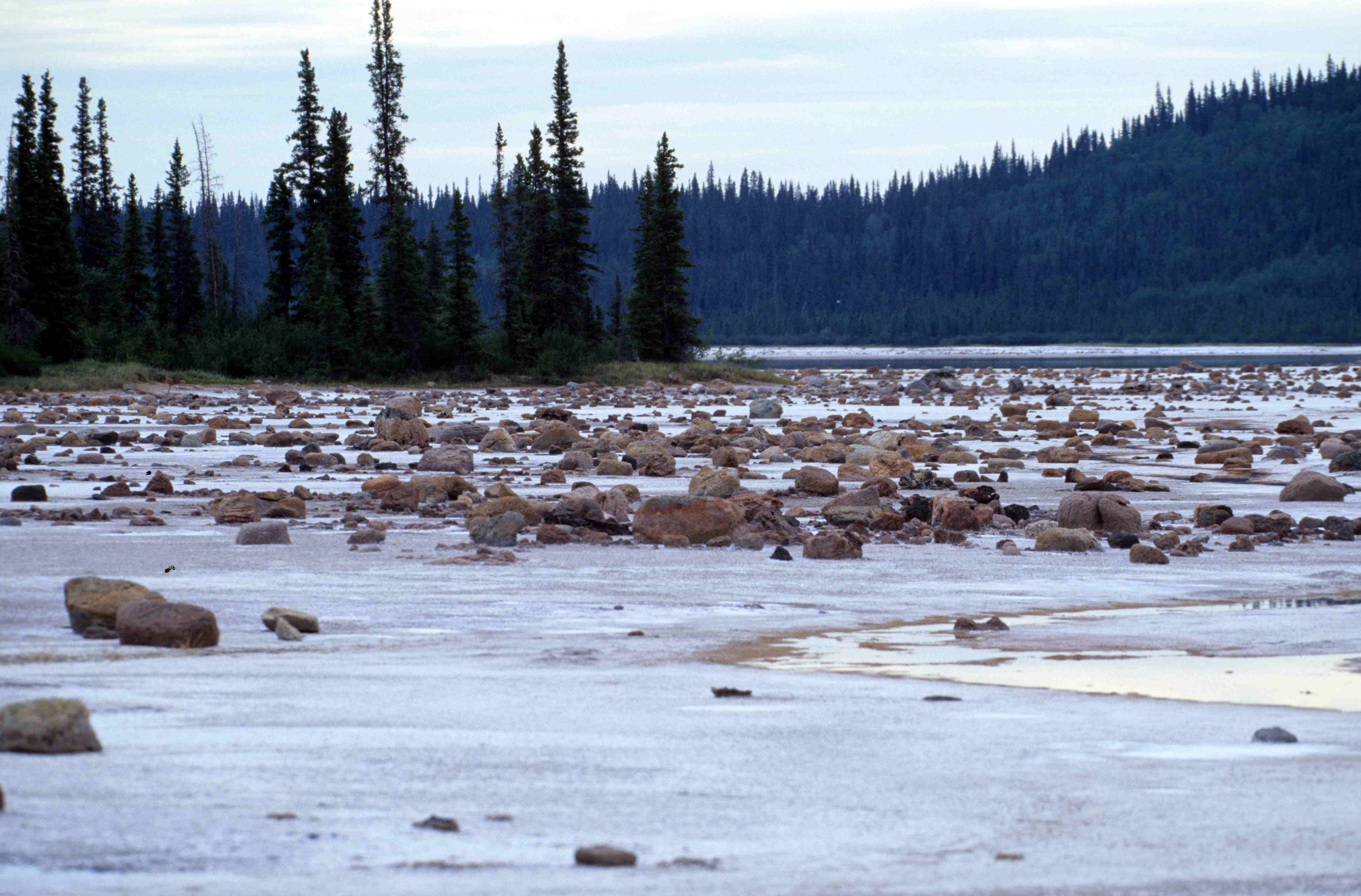
- Grosbeak Lake

- Location within Canada Location within Alberta
- Interactive map of Wood Buffalo National Park
- Location: Alberta and Northwest Territories, Canada
- Nearest city: Fort Chipewyan; Fort Smith
- Coordinates: 59°23′N 112°59′W
- Area: 44,741 km^{2} (17,275 sq mi)
- Established: 1922
- Visitors: 2399 (in 2022–23)
- Governing body: Parks Canada
- Website: pc.gc.ca/en/pn-np/nt/woodbuffalo

UNESCO World Heritage Site
- Criteria: Natural: vii, ix, x
- Reference: 256
- Inscription: 1983 (7th Session)

Wood Buffalo National Park is the largest national park of Canada at 44,741 km^{2} (17,275 sq mi). It is in northeastern Alberta and the southern Northwest Territories. Larger in area than Switzerland, it is the second-largest national park in the world. The park was established in 1922 to protect the world's largest herd of free-roaming wood bison. They became hybridized after the introduction of plains bison. The population is currently estimated at 3,000. It is one of two known nesting sites of whooping cranes.

The park ranges in elevation from 183 m (600 ft) at the Little Buffalo River to 945 m (3,100 ft) in the Caribou Mountains. The park headquarters is in Fort Smith, with a smaller satellite office in Fort Chipewyan, Alberta. The park contains one of the world's largest fresh-water deltas, the Peace-Athabasca Delta, formed by the Peace, Athabasca and Birch rivers.

It is also known for its karst sinkholes in the north-eastern section of the park. Alberta's largest springs (by volume, with an estimated discharge rate of eight cubic metres per second), Neon Lake Springs, are in the Jackfish River drainage. Wood Buffalo is located directly north of the Athabasca Oil Sands.

This area was designated in 1983 as a UNESCO World Heritage Site for the biological diversity of the Peace-Athabasca Delta, and for the population of wild bison. It is the most ecologically complete and largest example of the Great Plains-Boreal grassland ecosystem of North America.

On June 28, 2013, the Royal Astronomical Society of Canada designated Wood Buffalo National Park as Canada's newest and the world's largest dark-sky preserve. The designation helps preserve nighttime ecology for the park's large populations of bats, night hawks and owls, as well as providing opportunities for visitors to experience the northern lights.

== History ==
=== Before the park ===
This region has been inhabited by human cultures since the end of the last ice age. Aboriginal peoples in this region have followed variations on the subarctic lifeway, based around hunting, fishing, and gathering. Situated at the junction of three major rivers used as canoe routes for trade: the Athabasca, Peace and Slave rivers, the region that later was defined as the national park was well travelled by indigenous peoples for millennia.

In recorded times, the Dane-zaa (historically called the Beaver tribe), the Chipewyan people, the South Slavey (Dene Thaʼ), and Woods Cree people inhabited the region, where they sometimes competed for resources and trade. The Dane-zaa, Chipewyan, and South Slavey speak (or spoke) languages from the Northern Athabaskan family. These languages are common also among the peoples in the regions to the north and west of the park, who call themselves the Dene collectively. The Cree, by contrast, are an Algonquian people. They are thought to have migrated here from the east within the timeframe of recorded history, as most Algonquian-speaking peoples are along the Atlantic coast, from Canada and south through much of the United States.

Sometime after 1781, when a smallpox epidemic decimated the region, the Dene and Cree made a peace treaty at Peace Point through a ceremonial pipe ceremony. This is the origin of the name of the Peace River that flows through the region: the river was used to define a boundary between the Dane-zaa to the North and the Cree to the South.

Explorer Peter Pond is believed to have passed through the region in 1785, likely the first European to do so, followed by Alexander Mackenzie three years later. In 1788 British fur traders established posts at Fort Chipewyan, just east of the current boundaries of the park, and Fort Vermilion close to the west. Fur traders followed the First Nations in using the Peace River as part of their network of canoe routes for the North American fur trade. The Métis people, descendants initially of European traders and indigenous women, developed as another major ethnic group in the region.

After nearly another century of domination by the Hudson's Bay Company, Canada purchased the company's claim to the region. Agriculture was never developed in this part of Western Canada, unlike to the south. Hunting and trapping remained the dominant industry in this region well into the 20th century, and are still vital to many of its inhabitants. Following the Klondike Gold Rush of 1897, the Canadian government was keen to extinguish Aboriginal title to the land. It wanted to be able to exploit any mineral wealth found in the future without having to contend with possible objections from First Nations. The Crown signed Treaty 8 with these peoples on 21 June 1899, acquiring much of the territory as Crown land.

=== As a national park ===
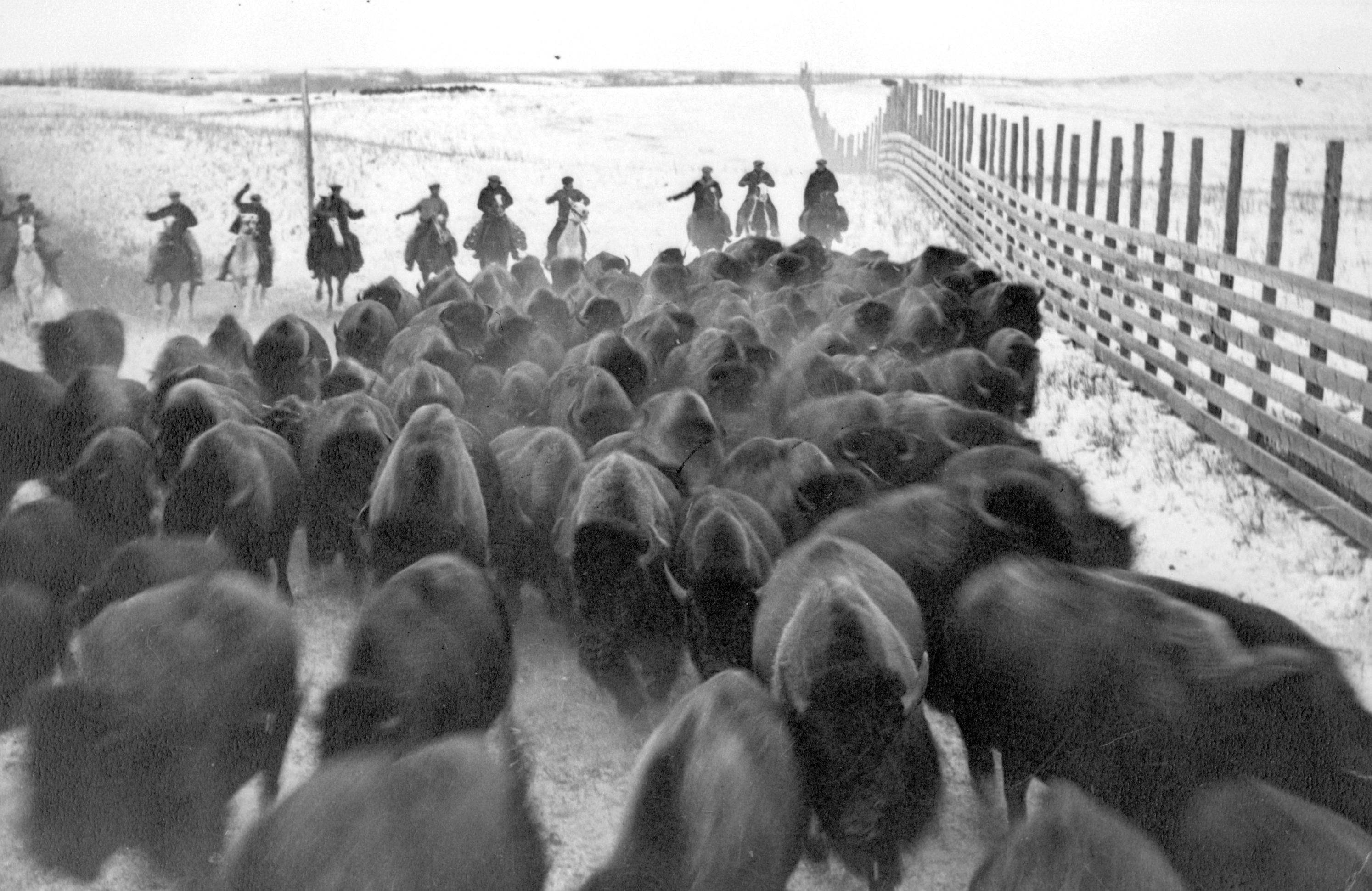
Plains bison were transferred here from Buffalo National Park in the 1920s, but they carried disease and hybridized with the wood bison, causing their numbers to drop.

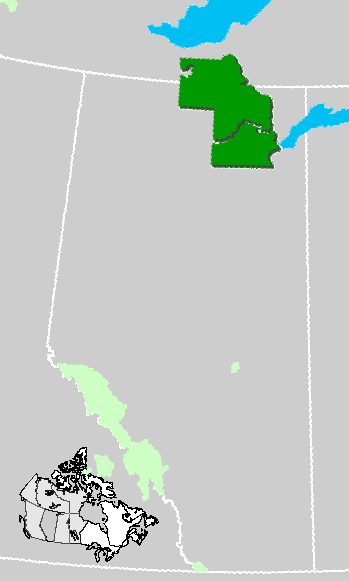
Location and extent of the park (dark green)

Established in 1922, the park was created on Crown land acquired through Treaty 8 between Canada and the local First Nations. The park completely surrounds several Indian reserves such as Peace Point and ʔejëre Kʼelnı Kuę́ (also called Hay Camp).

Despite protests from biologists, between 1925 and 1928 the government relocated nearly 6,700 plains bison here from Buffalo National Park, to avoid unwanted mass culling at the latter park due to over-population there. The plains bison hybridized with the local 1,500–2,000 wood bison, and carried such diseases as bovine tuberculosis and brucellosis, which they introduced into the wood bison herd. Since that time park officials have tried to undo this damage, making successive culls of diseased animals.

In 1957, a healthy and relatively pure wood bison herd of 200 was discovered near Nyarling River. In 1965, 23 of these bison were relocated to the south side of Elk Island National Park. Today, they number 300 and are the most genetically pure wood bison remaining.

Between 1951 and 1967, 4000 bison were killed and 910 tonnes (2 million pounds) of meat were sold from a special abattoir built at Hay Camp. These smaller culls did not eradicate the diseases. In 1990, the government announced a plan to destroy the entire herd and restock the park with disease-free bison from Elk Island National Park. The public quickly reacted negatively to this plan and it was abandoned.

Local governance within the Alberta portion of Wood Buffalo National Park was introduced on January 1, 1967, with the incorporation of an improvement district. Originally numbered as Improvement District No. 150, it was renumbered as Improvement District No. 24 on January 1, 1969.

In 1983, a 21-year lease was granted to Canadian Forest Products Ltd. to log a 50,000-hectare area of Wood Buffalo National Park. The Canadian Parks and Wilderness Society filed a lawsuit against Parks Canada for violating the National Parks Act. Before the trial commenced in 1992, Parks Canada acquiesced and recognized that the lease was invalid and unauthorized by the provisions of the act.

In March 2019, Kitaskino Nuwenëné Wildland Provincial Park was established on the borders of Wood Buffalo National Park. The Mikisew Cree First Nation had first proposed protecting this land as a park. It preserves the natural ecosystems from the expanding industrial areas north of Fort McMurray. The park was created after three oil companies, Teck Resources, Cenovus Energy, and Imperial Oil, voluntarily gave up certain oilsands and mining leases in the area, following negotiations with the Alberta government and Indigenous groups. This provincial park is closed to forestry and new energy projects. But existing wells can keep producing, and traditional Indigenous land uses are allowed.

== Conservation ==
As a UNESCO World Heritage Site, Wood Buffalo National Park has been the subject of ongoing monitoring and concern about its ecological health and Indigenous land use. In 2019, UNESCO expressed serious concerns about declining water quality and overall management, warning that the park could be placed on the List of World Heritage in Danger if conditions worsened; in response the federal government cited an earlier commitment of $27.5 million over five years to support development and early implementation of an action plan. Subsequent federal announcements in 2020 committed an additional $59.9 million over three years to implement the Wood Buffalo National Park World Heritage Site Action Plan, including strengthened park management, monitoring of the Peace–Athabasca Delta, and collaboration with Indigenous partners. In 2026, under "A Force of Nature: Canada's Strategy to Protect Nature", the federal government also earmarked $90 million over five years for continued implementation of the Wood Buffalo National Park World Heritage Site Action Plan and for the recovery of two wood bison populations along the Alberta–Northwest Territories border.

== Climate ==
In the park, summers are very short, but days are long. Temperatures range between 10 and 30 °C (50.0 and 86.0 °F) during this season. On average, summers are characterized by warm and dry days; in some years, there may be a pattern of cool and wet days. The mean high in July is 22.5 °C (72.5 °F) while the mean low is 9.5 °C (49.1 °F). Fall tends to have cool, windy and dry days, and the first snowfall usually occurs in October. Winters are cold with temperatures that can drop below −40 °C (−40.0 °F) in January and February, the coldest months. The mean high in January is −21.7 °C (−7.1 °F) while the mean low is −31.8 °C (−25.2 °F). In spring, temperatures gradually warm up as the days become longer.

== Wildlife ==
Wood Buffalo National Park contains a large variety of wildlife species, including American black bears, American martens, bald eagles, Canada lynxes, great grey owls, hawks, marmots, North American beavers, Northwestern wolves, peregrine falcons, red foxes, ruffed grouse, sandhill cranes, snowshoe hares, snowy owls, Western moose, whooping cranes, wolverines, wood bison, and the world's northernmost population of Red-sided Garter snakes, which form communal dens within the park. Grizzly bears, North American cougars, feral horses, and muskoxen have been recorded within and in the vicinity of the park.

Wood Buffalo Park contains the only natural nesting habitat for the endangered whooping crane. Known as Whooping Crane Summer Range, it is classified as a Ramsar site. It was identified through the International Biological Program. The range is a complex of contiguous water bodies, primarily lakes and various wetlands, such as marshes and bogs, but also includes streams and ponds.

In 2007, the world's largest beaver dam – about 850-metre (2,790 ft) in length – was discovered in the park using satellite imagery. The dam, at 58°16.3′N 112°15.1′W, about 200 kilometres (120 mi) from Fort Chipewyan, had only been sighted by satellite and fixed-wing aircraft since July 2014.

=== Hybrid bison ===
As above-mentioned, "wood bison" in the park are hybrid descendants, the product of unions with plains bison that were transferred to the park in the 1920s from Buffalo National Park. The plains bison were more numerous and were found to have been carrying diseases that became established among the bison in the park. That, plus the hybridization that ensued, threatened the survival of true wood bison. A 1995 study detected that there have been notable differences in morphology among each herd within the park, which have developed different degrees of hybridization. The herd at the Sweetgrass Station near Peace–Athabasca Delta, followed by Slave River Lowlands herd, preserve a phenotype closer to the original wood bison before the 1920s. They are more true to the original types than the preserved herds at Elk Island National Park and Mackenzie Bison Sanctuary.

== Transportation ==
Year-round access is available to Fort Smith by road on the Mackenzie Highway, which connects to Highway 5 near Hay River. Commercial flights are available to Fort Smith and Fort Chipewyan from Edmonton. Winter access is also available using winter and ice roads from Fort McMurray through Fort Chipewyan.

== Gallery ==
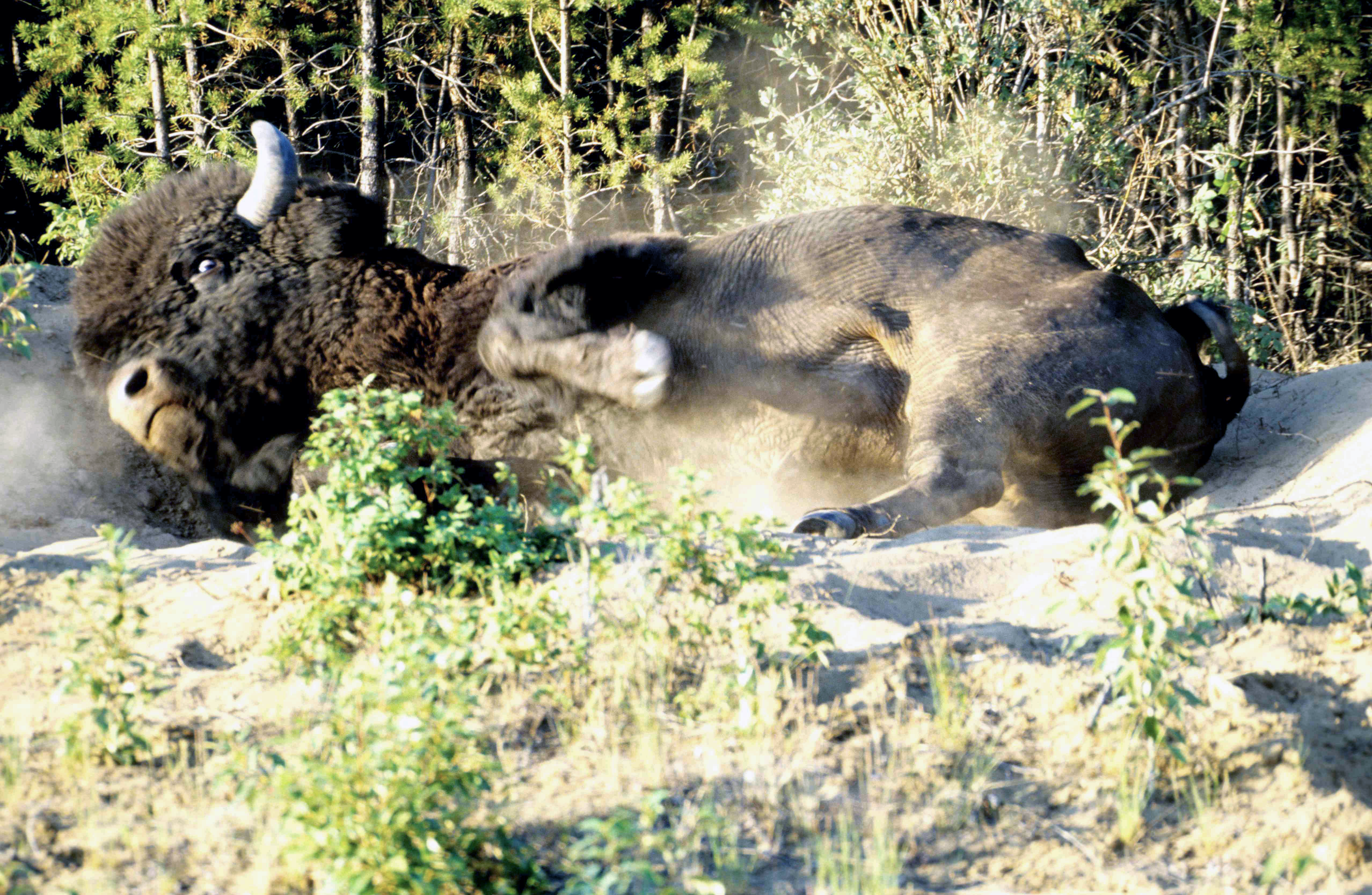
Wood bison (not pure)

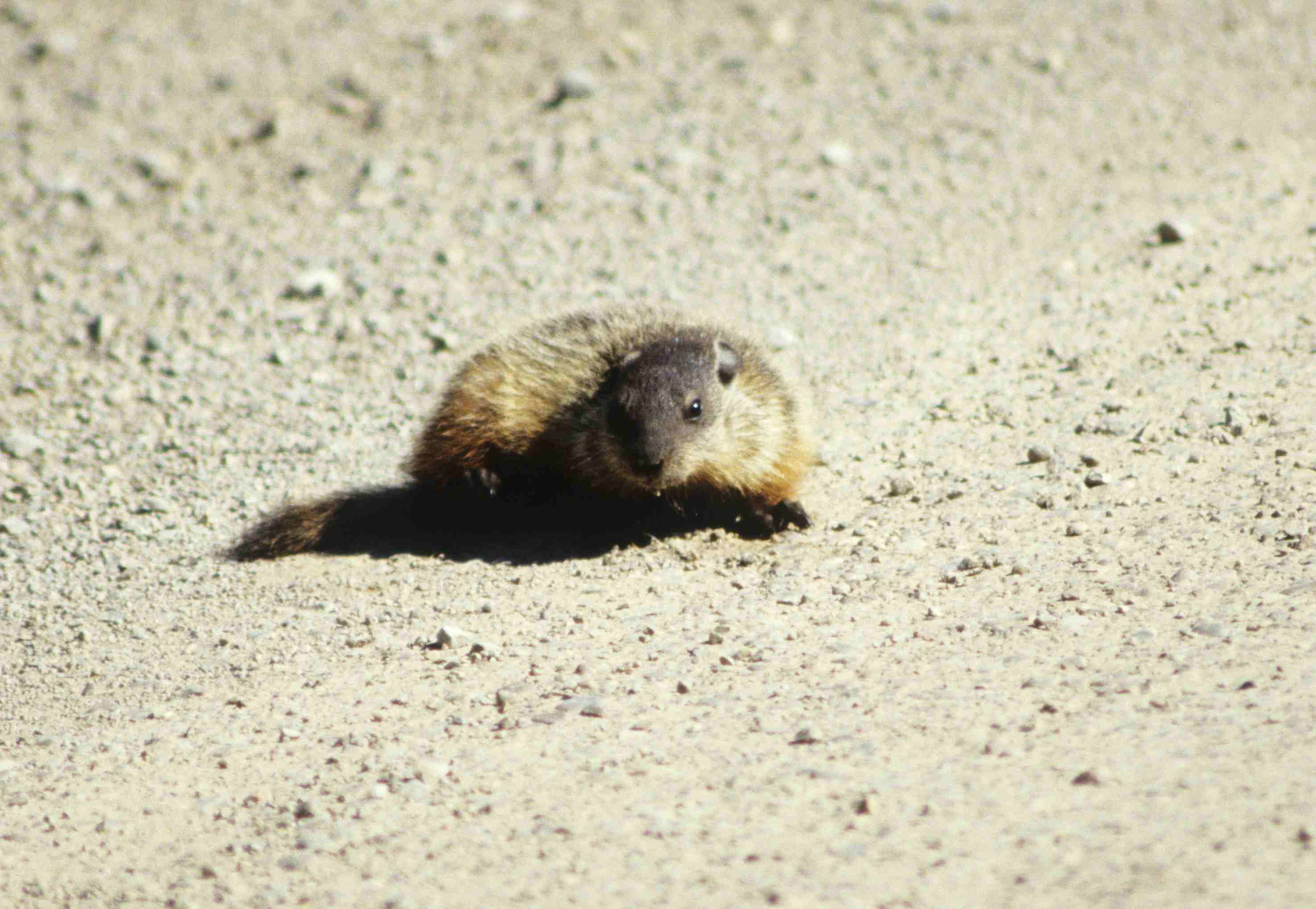
Marmot

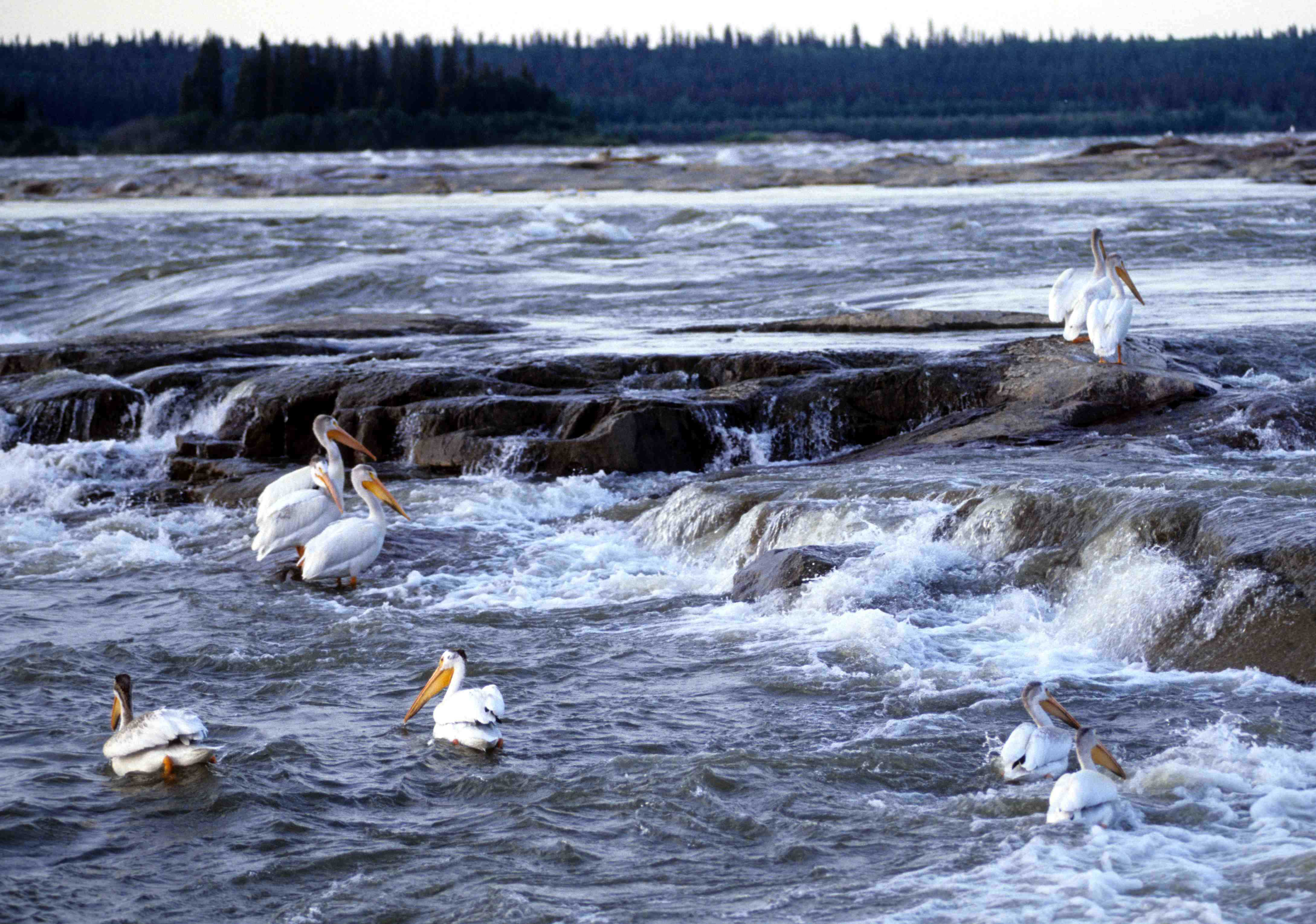
American white pelicans at Rapids of the Drowned (Slave River)

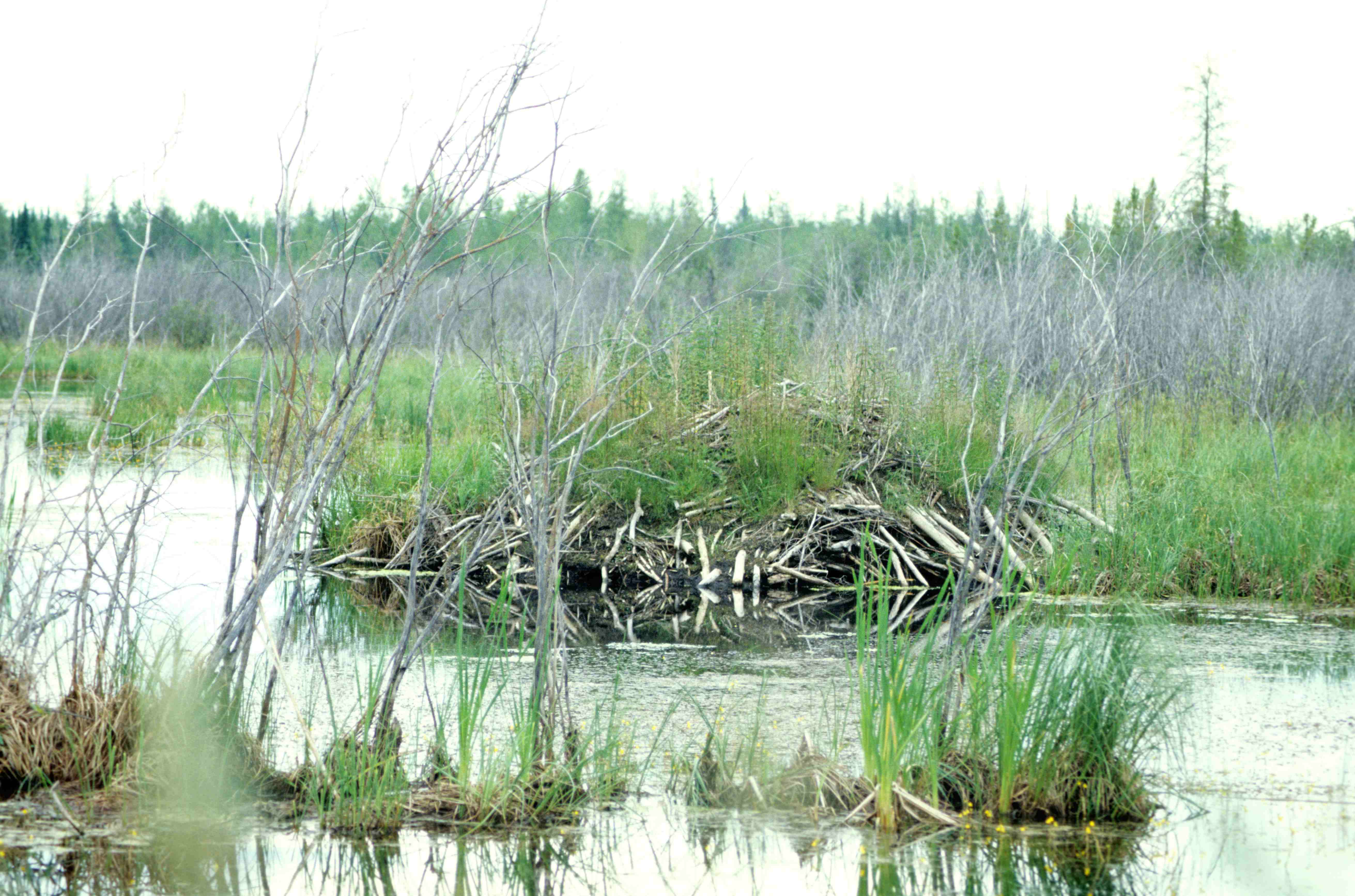
Beaver lodge

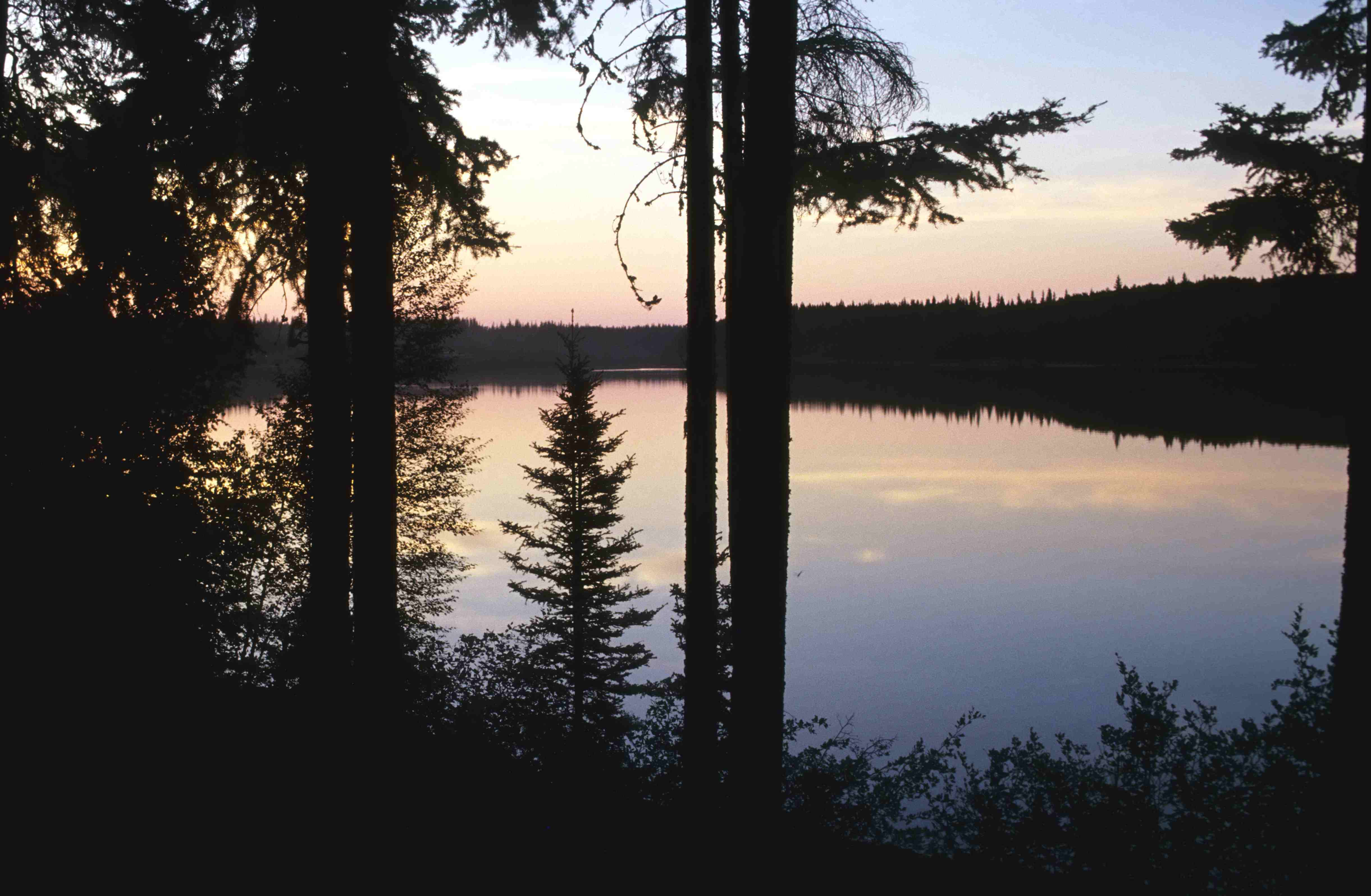
Pine Lake

== See also ==
- Buffalo National Park
- Garden River, Alberta
- List of mountains of Alberta
- List of national parks of Canada
- List of protected areas of the Northwest Territories
- List of protected areas of Alberta
- List of trails in Alberta
- List of waterfalls of Alberta
- National parks of Canada
