= Treaty 8 =

Treaty between First Nations and Canadian Crown

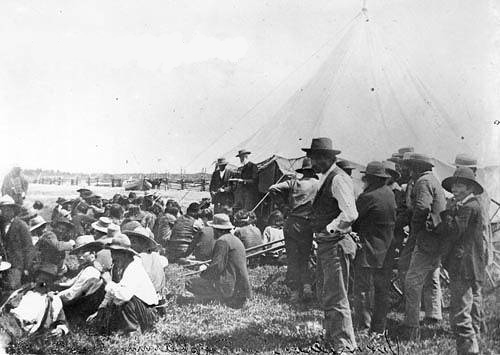
- David Laird explaining terms of Treaty 8, Fort Vermilion, 1899
- Signed: June 21, 1899
- Location: Just south of present-day Grouard, Alberta
- Parties: Canada; Various First Nations of the Lesser Slave Lake area
- Languages: English

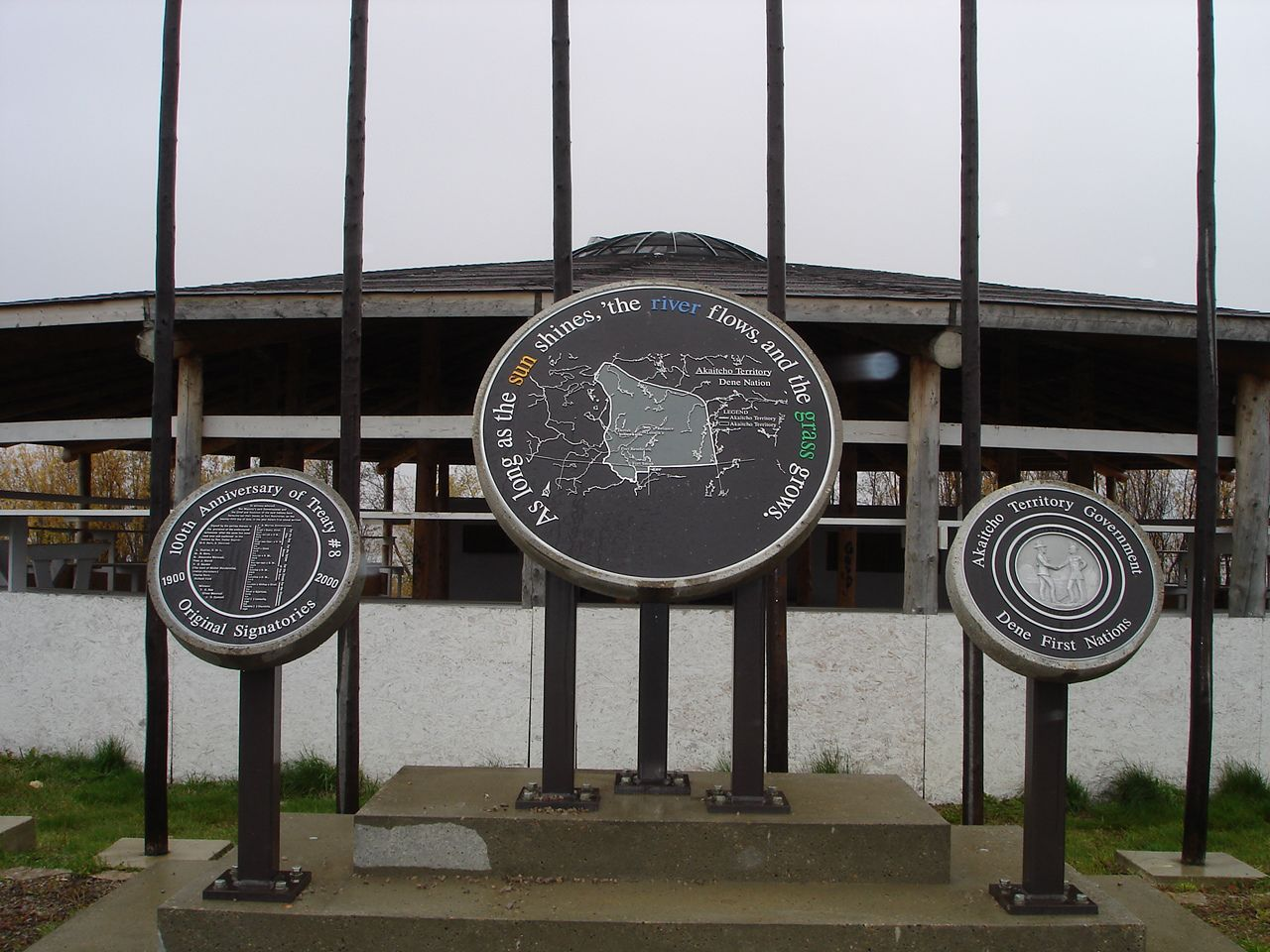
Treaty 8 site in Fort Resolution

Treaty 8, which concluded with the June 21, 1899, signing by representatives of the Crown and various First Nations of the Lesser Slave Lake area, is the most comprehensive of the eleven Numbered Treaties. The agreement encompassed a land mass of approximately 841,000 km^{2} (324,900 sq mi). Treaty territory, which includes thirty-nine First Nation communities in northern Alberta, northwestern Saskatchewan, northeastern British Columbia, and the southwest portion of the Northwest Territories, making it the largest of the numbered treaty in terms of area. The treaty was negotiated just south of present-day Grouard, Alberta.

The Crown had between 1871 and 1877 signed Treaties 1 to 7. Treaties 1 to 7 cover the southern portions of what was the North-West Territories. At that time, the Government of Canada had not considered a treaty with the First Nations in what would be the Treaty 8 territory necessary, as conditions in the north were not considered conducive to settlement. Along with the Douglas Treaties, Treaty 8 was the last treaty signed between the Crown and the First Nations in British Columbia until the Nisga'a Final Agreement.

The boundary between Treaty 8 and Treaty 11 is ambiguous. The Yellowknives Dene First Nation is a signatory to Treaty 8, but according to the text of the treaties the Yellowknives Nation's territory, known as Chief Drygeese Territory, is within Treaty 11.

== Overview ==
According to the official Treaty 8 web page, the terms of the treaty were accepted by the signatories for "reasons of peace and friendship" as part of a partnership. It was the most comprehensive of all the Numbered Treaties which included approximately 841,000 km^{2} (324,900 sq mi) of land that spanned the northern regions of what are now three provinces—British Columbia, Alberta, and Saskatchewan—and the Northwest Territories. There are thirty-nine First Nations communities that are included in Treaty 8. Grand Chief Arthur Noskey of the First Nations of Treaty 8 Alberta was re-elected on July 30, 2021.

== Background ==
In the late 1890s, as prospectors and settlers—inspired by the Klondike Gold Rush—travelled to unceded territories that were north of Treaty 6, the Canadian government extended the treaty process north to include that region. It included Lake Athabasca, Great Slave Lake, some areas around the Peace River region. By that time, the Geological Survey of Canada had also published reports that there was petroleum in the Athabaska region.

== Treaty ==
The land covered by Treaty 8, 840,000 km^{2} (320,000 sq mi), is larger than France and includes northern Alberta, northeastern British Columbia, northwestern Saskatchewan and a southernmost portion of the Northwest Territories. Adhesions to this agreement were signed that same year on July 1, 1899, at Peace River Landing, July 6 at Dunvegan, July 8 at Fort Vermilion, July 13 at Fort Chipewyan, July 17 at Smith's Landing (now Fitzgerald), July 25 and 27 at Fond du Lac, August 4 at Fort McMurray, and August 14 at Wabasca Lake. Further adhesions were in 1900 on May 13 at Fort St. John, June 8 at Lesser Slave Lake, June 23 at Fort Vermilion and July 25 at Fort Resolution.

Chief Keenooshayoo was one of the First Nations signatories to Treaty 8. First Nations that are considered signatories to Treaty 8 include Woodland Cree, Dane-zaa (or Beaver) and Chipewyan. Other signatories included David Laird, Father Albert Lacombe, Rev. George Homes, Bishop Émile Grouard, J.A.J. McKenna, James Hamilton Ross, W.G. White, James Walker, A. Arthur Cote, A.E. Snyder, H.B. Round, Harrison S. Young, J.F. Prud'Homme, C. Mair, H.A. Conroy, Pierre Deschambeault, Joseph Henri Picard, Richard Secord, Matthew McCauley, Headman Moostoos, Headman Felix Giroux, and Headman Wee Chee Way Sis, Headman Charles Neesotasis.

According to the University of Lethbridge's historian, Raymond Huel, prior to entering negotiations for Treaty, officials turned to Oblate (OMI) missionaries for assistance as they had lived among the First Nations. The Oblates, had been eye-witnesses to the rapid deterioration of the lifestyle of First Nations since the 1870s, and considered the treaties to be the "lesser of two evils", according to Huel. Government officials chose the Catholic missionary, Albert Lacombe, (OMI) as Treaty 8 signatory and government consultant and mediator, because of his many years of experience with the First Nations who had come to trust him. Lacombe was charged by the government to be present to help convince First Nations that it was in their interest to enter into a treaty. He was present on June 21, 1899, and assured the First Nations that their lives would remain, more or less, unchanged. He was also present at some of the meetings at which adhesions were signed. The elements of Treaty 8 included provisions to maintain livelihood for the native populations in this 840,000 km^{2} (320,000 sq mi) region, such as entitlements to land, ongoing financial support, annual shipments of hunting supplies, and hunting rights on ceded lands, unless those ceded lands were used for forestry, mining, settlement or other purposes.

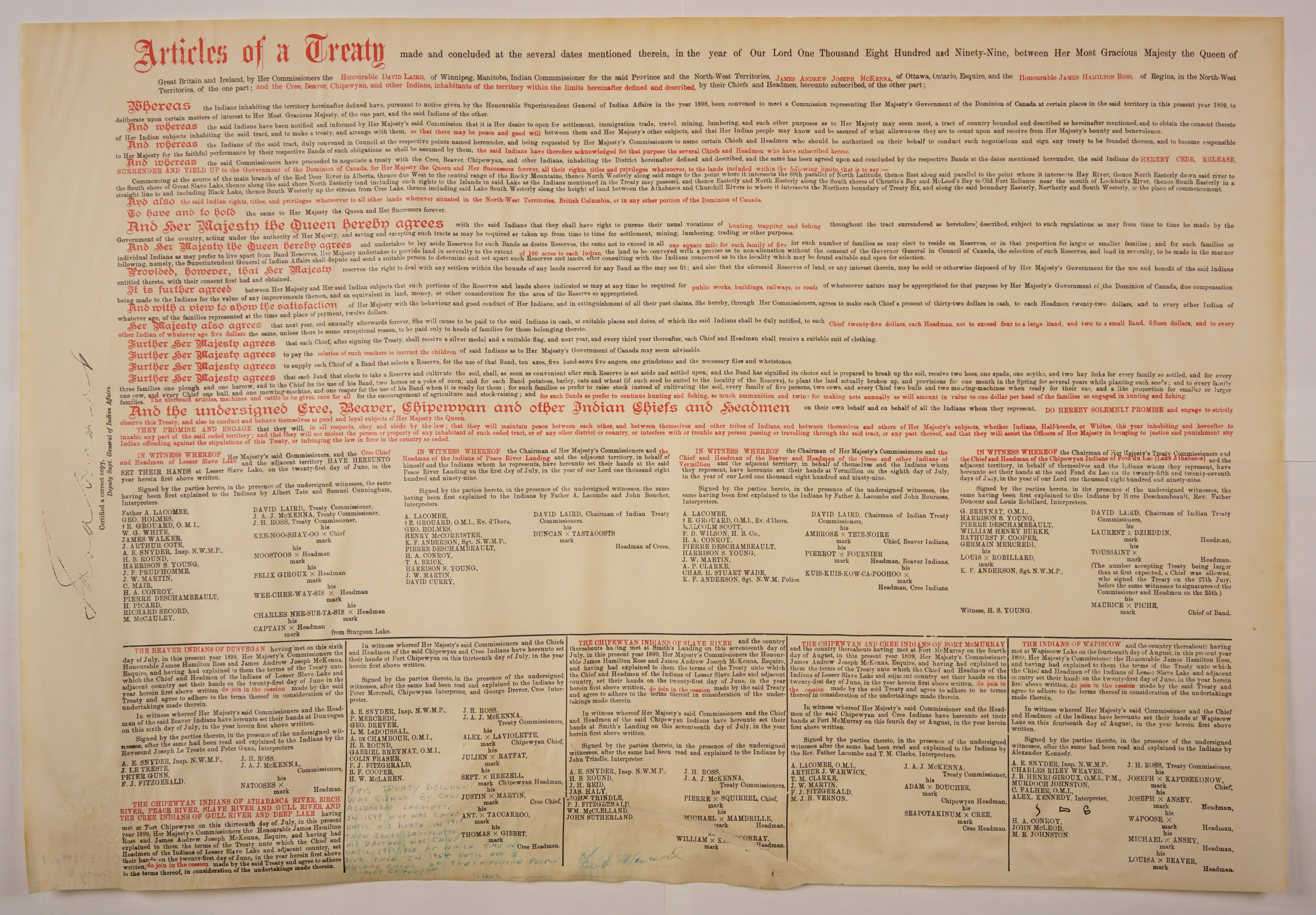
Presentation copy of the original Treaty 8. Printed on parchment. Text in black and red; blue and red border

== See also ==
- List of treaties
- Status of First Nations treaties in British Columbia
- The Canadian Crown and Indigenous peoples of Canada
