= List of Indian reserves in Alberta =

First Nations reserves for First Nations in Alberta were established by a series of treaties — Treaty 6, Treaty 7, and Treaty 8.

According to the Government of Alberta reserves cover a total area of 656,660 ha (1,622,630 acres). However, according to Indigenous and Northern Affairs Canada reserves in Alberta total 866,022.8 ha (2,139,989 acres). Indigenous and Northern Affairs Canada and Statistics Canada recognize six Indian settlements within Alberta.

== List of reserves in Alberta ==
List of Indian reserves and settlements in Alberta
Name as used by Indigenous and Northern Affairs Canada	First Nation(s)	Ethnic/national group	Tribal council	Treaty	Area		Population			Notes
Name as used by Indigenous and Northern Affairs Canada	First Nation(s)	Ethnic/national group	Tribal council	Treaty	ha	acre	2016	2011	% difference	Notes
Ɂejëre Kʼelnı Kuę́ 196I	Smith's Landing	Dene		8	213.0	526.3				INAC lists the reserve in Alberta and the band headquartered in Fort Smith, Northwest Territories
Alexander 134	Alexander	Beaver Hills Cree	Yellowhead Tribal Development Foundation	6	7,280.5	17,990.5	1,099	1,027	7.0%	
Alexander 134A	Alexander	Beaver Hills Cree	Yellowhead Tribal Development Foundation	6	2,303.3	5,691.6				
Alexander 134B	Alexander	Beaver Hills Cree	Yellowhead Tribal Development Foundation	6	3.4	8.4				
Alexis 133	Alexis Nakota Sioux	Nakoda	Yellowhead Tribal Development Foundation	6	6,175.2	15,259.3	755	817	-7.6%	
Alexis Cardinal River 234	Alexis Nakota Sioux	Nakoda	Yellowhead Tribal Development Foundation	6	4,661.0	11,517.6				
Alexis Elk River 233	Alexis Nakota Sioux	Nakoda	Yellowhead Tribal Development Foundation	6	98.0	242.2				
Alexis Whitecourt 232	Alexis Nakota Sioux	Nakoda	Yellowhead Tribal Development Foundation	6	3,544.9	8,759.6				
Allison Bay 219	Mikisew Cree	Woodland Cree		8	1,861.0	4,598.6	127	84	51.2%	
Amber River 211	Dene Tha'	Slavey	North Peace Tribal Council	8	2,332.3	5,763.2				
Assineau River 150F	Swan River	Woods Cree	Lesser Slave Lake Indian Regional Council	8	71.6	176.9				
Beaver Lake 131	Beaver Lake Cree	Cree	Tribal Chiefs Ventures Incorporated	6	6,145.3	15,185.4	414	423	-2.1%	
Beaver Ranch 163	Tallcree First Nation	Woodland Cree	North Peace Tribal Council	8	841.7	2,079.9	10	16	-37.5%	
Beaver Ranch 163A	Tallcree First Nation	Woodland Cree	North Peace Tribal Council	8	240.0	593.1				
Beaver Ranch 163B	Tallcree First Nation	Woodland Cree	North Peace Tribal Council	8	226.0	558.5				
Big Horn 144A	Bearspaw; Chiniki; Stoney; Wesley	Nakoda	Stoney Nakoda - Tsuut'ina Tribal Council	7	2,127.4	5,256.9	237	134	76.9%	
Bistcho Lake 213	Dene Tha'	Slavey	North Peace Tribal Council	8	354.1	875.0				
Blood 148	Blood	Blackfoot Confederacy	Blackfoot Confederacy	7	134,292.9	331,845.0	4,570	4,679	-2.3%	
Blood 148A	Blood	Blackfoot Confederacy	Blackfoot Confederacy	7	1,971.7	4,872.2				
Blue Quills First Nation Indian Reserve	Beaver Lake Cree; Cold Lake; Frog Lake; Heart Lake; Kehewin Cree; Saddle Lake	Cree; Chipewyan; Cree; Cree; Cree; Beaver Hills Cree	Tribal Chiefs Ventures Incorporated	6	96.2	237.7				
Boyer 164	Beaver	Dane-zaa	North Peace Tribal Council	8	4,249.3	10,500.2	218	213	2.3%	
Buck Lake 133C	Paul	Cree / Nakoda		6	1,035.2	2,558.0				
Bushe River 207	Dene Tha'	Slavey	North Peace Tribal Council	8	111,675.0	275,954.9	503	492	2.2%	
Charles Lake 225	Mikisew Cree	Woodland Cree		8	64.5	159.4				
Child Lake 164A	Beaver	Dane-zaa	North Peace Tribal Council	8	1,035.2	2,558.0	216	188	14.9%	
Chipewyan 201	Athabasca Chipewyan	Chipewyan	Athabasca Tribal Council	8	20,072.4	49,600.0				
Chipewyan 201A	Athabasca Chipewyan	Chipewyan	Athabasca Tribal Council	8	9,516.2	23,515.0	0	5	-100.0%	
Chipewyan 201B	Athabasca Chipewyan	Chipewyan	Athabasca Tribal Council	8	19.4	47.9				
Chipewyan 201C	Athabasca Chipewyan	Chipewyan	Athabasca Tribal Council	8	18.2	45.0				
Chipewyan 201D	Athabasca Chipewyan	Chipewyan	Athabasca Tribal Council	8	4.3	10.6				
Chipewyan 201E	Athabasca Chipewyan	Chipewyan	Athabasca Tribal Council	8	4,165.5	10,293.2				
Chipewyan 201F	Athabasca Chipewyan	Chipewyan	Athabasca Tribal Council	8	66.4	164.1				
Chipewyan 201G	Athabasca Chipewyan	Chipewyan	Athabasca Tribal Council	8	905.3	2,237.0				
Clear Hills 152C	Horse Lake	Cree / Dane-zaa	Western Cree Tribal Council	8	1,547.1	3,823.0				
Clearwater 175	Fort McMurray #468	Cree / Chipewyan	Athabasca Tribal Council	8	915.4	2,262.0				
Cold Lake 149	Cold Lake	Chipewyan	Tribal Chiefs Ventures Incorporated	6	14,528.1	35,899.7	671	594	13.0%	
Cold Lake 149A	Cold Lake	Chipewyan	Tribal Chiefs Ventures Incorporated	6	71.6	176.9	40	45	-11.1%	
Cold Lake 149B	Cold Lake	Chipewyan	Tribal Chiefs Ventures Incorporated	6	4,134.0	10,215.3	163	149	9.4%	
Cold Lake 149C	Cold Lake	Chipewyan	Tribal Chiefs Ventures Incorporated	6	2,023.5	5,000.2				
Collin Lake 223	Mikisew Cree	Woodland Cree		8	36.4	89.9				
Cornwall Lake 224	Mikisew Cree	Woodland Cree		8	69.3	171.2				
Cowper Lake 194A	Chipewyan Prairie	Chipewyan	Athabasca Tribal Council	8	143.0	353.4				
Devil's Gate 220	Mikisew Cree	Woodland Cree		8	819.1	2,024.0				
Dog Head 218	Mikisew Cree	Woodland Cree		8	34.8	86.0	99	111	-10.8%	
Drift Pile River 150	Driftpile Cree	Cree	Lesser Slave Lake Indian Regional Council	8	6,354.8	15,703.1	828	800	3.5%	
Duncans 151A	Duncan's	Woods Cree	Western Cree Tribal Council	8	2,036.8	5,033.0	150	164	-8.5%	
Eden Valley 216	Bearspaw; Chiniki; Stoney; Wesley	Nakoda	Stoney Nakoda - Tsuut'ina Tribal Council	7	1,690.8	4,178.1	596	587	1.5%	
Enoch Cree Nation 135	Enoch Cree	Beaver Hills Cree		6	5,306.2	13,111.9	1,690	987	71.2%	Was Stony Plain 135
Enoch Cree Nation No. 135A	Enoch Cree	Beaver Hills Cree		6	2.0	4.9				
Ermineskin 138	Ermineskin Tribe	Cree	Maskwacis Cree Tribal Council	6	10,295.8	25,441.5	2,457	1,874	31.1%	
Fitzgerald No. 196	Salt River First Nation #195	Dene	Akaitcho Territory Government	8	3,715.0	9,180.0				Headquartered in the NWT
Fort McKay 174	Fort McKay	Cree / Dene	Athabasca Tribal Council	8	3,106.7	7,676.8				
Fort McKay 174C	Fort McKay	Cree / Dene	Athabasca Tribal Council	8	3,381.4	8,355.6				
Fort McKay 174D	Fort McKay	Cree / Dene	Athabasca Tribal Council	8	660.8	1,632.9				
Fort Vermilion 173B	Tallcree First Nation	Woodland Cree	North Peace Tribal Council	8	49.7	122.8	96	97	-1.0%	
Fox Lake 162	Little Red River Cree	Woods Cree	North Peace Tribal Council	8	10,438.3	25,793.6	2,032	1,875	8.4%	
Gregoire Lake 176	Fort McMurray #468	Cree / Chipewyan	Athabasca Tribal Council	8	2,231.9	5,515.1	191	274	-30.3%	
Gregoire Lake 176A	Fort McMurray #468	Cree / Chipewyan	Athabasca Tribal Council	8	67.4	166.5	130	0		
Gregoire Lake 176B	Fort McMurray #468	Cree / Chipewyan	Athabasca Tribal Council	8	17.0	42.0				
Hay Lake 209	Dene Tha'	Slavey	North Peace Tribal Council	8	12,355.3	30,530.6	883	949	-7.0%	
Heart Lake 167	Heart Lake	Cree	Tribal Chiefs Ventures Incorporated	6	4,496.2	11,110.4	184	159	15.7%	
Heart Lake 167A	Heart Lake	Cree	Tribal Chiefs Ventures Incorporated	6	8.3	20.5				
Hokedhe Túe 196E	Smith's Landing	Chipewyan		8	440.4	1,088.3				INAC lists the reserve in Alberta and the band headquartered in Fort Smith, Northwest Territories
Horse Lakes 152B	Horse Lake	Cree / Dane-zaa	Western Cree Tribal Council	8	1,552.0	3,835.1	469	402	16.7%	
Jackfish Point 214	Dene Tha'	Slavey	North Peace Tribal Council	8	103.6	256.0				
Janvier 194	Chipewyan Prairie	Chipewyan	Athabasca Tribal Council	8	2,486.7	6,144.8	414	295	40.3%	
Jean Baptiste Gambler 183	Bigstone Cree	Woods Cree		8	198.7	491.0	253	254	-0.4%	
John D'Or Prairie 215	Little Red River Cree	Woods Cree	North Peace Tribal Council	8	14,034.0	34,678.8	1,196	1,123	6.5%	
K'i Túe 196D	Smith's Landing	Chipewyan		8	484.3	1,196.7				INAC lists the reserve in Alberta and the band headquartered in Fort Smith, Northwest Territories
Kapawe'no First Nation 150B	Kapawe'no	Woods Cree	Lesser Slave Lake Indian Regional Council	8	29.6	73.1	154	115	33.9%	
Kapawe'no First Nation 150C	Kapawe'no	Woods Cree	Lesser Slave Lake Indian Regional Council	8	21.0	51.9				
Kapawe'no First Nation 150D	Kapawe'no	Woods Cree	Lesser Slave Lake Indian Regional Council	8	390.1	964.0	5	5	0.0%	
Kapawe'no First Nation 229	Kapawe'no	Woods Cree	Lesser Slave Lake Indian Regional Council	8	129.0	318.8				
Kapawe'no First Nation 230	Kapawe'no	Woods Cree	Lesser Slave Lake Indian Regional Council	8	846.0	2,090.5				
Kapawe'no First Nation 231	Kapawe'no	Woods Cree	Lesser Slave Lake Indian Regional Council	8	147.0	363.2				
Kehewin 123	Kehewin Cree	Cree	Tribal Chiefs Ventures Incorporated	6	8,225.0	20,324.4	976	1,065	-8.4%	
Li Dezé 196C	Smith's Landing	Chipewyan		8	729.4	1,802.4				INAC lists the reserve in Alberta and the band headquartered in Fort Smith, Northwest Territories
Loon Lake 235	Loon River Cree	Woods Cree	Kee Tas Kee Now Tribal Council	8	6,902.3	17,056.0	555	511	8.6%	
Loon Prairie 237	Loon River Cree	Woods Cree	Kee Tas Kee Now Tribal Council	8	259.6	641.5				
Louis Bull 138B	Louis Bull	Beaver Hills Cree	Maskwacis Cree Tribal Council	6	3,388.1	8,372.2	1,177	1,309	-10.1%	
Makaoo 120	Onion Lake Cree	Cree		6	5,626.6	13,903.6	208	180	15.6%	Headquartered in Saskatchewan
Montana 139	Montana	Cree	Maskwacis Cree Tribal Council	6	2,824.8	6,980.2	630	653	-3.5%	
Namur Lake 174B	Fort McKay	Cree / Dene	Athabasca Tribal Council	8	3,122.2	7,715.1				
Namur River 174A	Fort McKay	Cree / Dene	Athabasca Tribal Council	8	4,614.9	11,403.7				
O'Chiese 203	O'Chiese	Anishinaabe	Yellowhead Tribal Development Foundation	6	14,131.9	34,920.7	789	751	5.1%	
O'Chiese Cemetery 203A	O'Chiese	Anishinaabe	Yellowhead Tribal Development Foundation	6	0.1	0.2				
Old Fort 217	Mikisew Cree	Woodland Cree		8	1,509.0	3,728.8				
Peace Point 222	Mikisew Cree	Woodland Cree		8	518.0	1,280.0				
Peerless Trout 238	Peerless Trout	Woods Cree	Kee Tas Kee Now Tribal Council	8	3,553.2	8,780.1				
Peigan Timber Limit "B"	Piikani	Piegan Blackfeet	Blackfoot Confederacy	7	2,978.6	7,360.3				
Pigeon Lake 138A	Ermineskin Tribe; Louis Bull; Montana; Samson	Beaver Hills Cree; Beaver Hills Cree; Cree; Beaver Hills Cree	Maskwacis Cree Tribal Council	6	1,921.1	4,747.1	429	485	-11.5%	
PiikanI	Piikani	Piegan Blackfeet	Blackfoot Confederacy	7	42,699.2	105,512.0	1,544	1,217	26.9%	
Puskiakiwenin 122	Frog Lake	Cree	Tribal Chiefs Ventures Incorporated	6	10,339.1	25,548.5	531	484	9.7%	
Saddle Lake 125	Saddle Lake Cree	Beaver Hills Cree		6	25,780.6	63,705.2	UN	UN	UN	
Samson 137	Samson	Beaver Hills Cree	Maskwacis Cree Tribal Council	6	13,552.0	33,487.7	3,373	3,746	-10.0%	
Samson 137A	Samson	Beaver Hills Cree	Maskwacis Cree Tribal Council	6	134.4	332.1	26	38	-31.6%	
Sandy Point 221	Mikisew Cree	Woodland Cree		8	204.0	504.1				
Sawridge 150G	Sawridge	Woods Cree	Lesser Slave Lake Indian Regional Council	8	906.5	2,240.0	20	48	-58.3%	
Sawridge 150H	Sawridge	Woods Cree	Lesser Slave Lake Indian Regional Council	8	1,236.8	3,056.2	10	20	-50.0%	
Siksika 146	Siksika	Piegan Blackfeet	Blackfoot Confederacy	7	71,087.5	175,661.0	3,479	2,972	17.1%	
Stoney 142-143-144	Bearspaw; Chiniki; Stoney; Wesley	Nakoda	Stoney Nakoda - Tsuut'ina Tribal Council	7	39,264.5	97,024.7	3,713	3,494	6.3%	
Stoney 142B	Bearspaw; Chiniki; Stoney; Wesley	Nakoda	Stoney Nakoda - Tsuut'ina Tribal Council	7	5,692.4	14,066.2				
Sturgeon Lake 154	Sturgeon Lake Cree	Woods Cree	Western Cree Tribal Council	8	14,814.3	36,606.9	1,447	1,162	24.5%	
Sturgeon Lake 154A	Sturgeon Lake Cree	Woods Cree	Western Cree Tribal Council	8	753.1	1,861.0	53	24	120.8%	
Sturgeon Lake 154B	Sturgeon Lake Cree	Woods Cree	Western Cree Tribal Council	8	97.1	239.9				
Sucker Creek 150A	Sucker Creek	Woods Cree	Lesser Slave Lake Indian Regional Council	8	5,987.0	14,794.2	689	677	1.8%	
Sunchild 202	Sunchild	Beaver Hills Cree	Yellowhead Tribal Development Foundation	6	5,218.1	12,894.2	749	677	10.6%	
Swampy Lake 236	Loon River Cree	Woods Cree	Kee Tas Kee Now Tribal Council	8	14,744.4	36,434.2	413	312	32.4%	
Swan River 150E	Swan River	Woods Cree	Lesser Slave Lake Indian Regional Council	8	4,271.1	10,554.1	250	202	23.8%	
Tall Cree 173	Tallcree First Nation	Woodland Cree	North Peace Tribal Council	8	4,031.5	9,962.1	224	163	37.4%	
Tall Cree 173A	Tallcree First Nation	Woodland Cree	North Peace Tribal Council	8	2,723.4	6,729.7	28	0		
Thabacha Náre 196A	Smith's Landing	Chipewyan		8	397.2	981.5	20	30	-33.3%	INAC lists the reserve in Alberta and the band headquartered in Fort Smith, Northwest Territories
Thebathi 196	Smith's Landing	Chipewyan		8	6,524.0	16,121.2				INAC lists the reserve in Alberta and the band headquartered in Fort Smith, Northwest Territories
Tsu K'adhe Túe 196F	Smith's Landing	Chipewyan		8	231.6	572.3				INAC lists the reserve in Alberta and the band headquartered in Fort Smith, Northwest Territories
Tsu Nedehe Tue 196H	Smith's Landing	Chipewyan		8	586.0	1,448.0				INAC lists the reserve in Alberta and the band headquartered in Fort Smith, Northwest Territories
Tsu Túe 196G	Smith's Landing	Chipewyan		8	42.7	105.5				INAC lists the reserve in Alberta and the band headquartered in Fort Smith, Northwest Territories
Tsuu T'ina Nation 145	Tsuut'ina	Dene	Stoney Nakoda - Tsuut'ina Tribal Council	7	29,417.4	72,692.0	1,643	2,052	-19.9%	
Tthejëre Ghaı̨lı̨ 196B	Smith's Landing	Chipewyan		8	401.1	991.1				INAC lists the reserve in Alberta and the band headquartered in Fort Smith, Northwest Territories
Unipouheos 121	Frog Lake	Cree	Tribal Chiefs Ventures Incorporated	6	8,506.3	21,019.5	909	813	11.8%	
Upper Hay River 212	Dene Tha'	Slavey	North Peace Tribal Council	8	1,418.0	3,504.0	294	292	0.7%	
Utikoomak Lake 155	Whitefish Lake	Woods Cree	Kee Tas Kee Now Tribal Council	8	6,756.1	16,694.7	723	644	12.3%	
Utikoomak Lake 155A	Whitefish Lake	Woods Cree	Kee Tas Kee Now Tribal Council	8	1,041.0	2,572.4	127	121	5.0%	
Utikoomak Lake 155B	Whitefish Lake	Woods Cree	Kee Tas Kee Now Tribal Council	8	502.6	1,242.0	850	880	4.0%	
Wabamun 133A	Paul	Cree / Nakoda		6	6,116.9	15,115.2	1,592	1,069	48.9%	
Wabamun 133B	Paul	Cree / Nakoda		6	178.5	441.1	30	17	76.5%	
Wabasca 166	Bigstone Cree	Woods Cree		8	8,452.4	20,886.3	160	152	5.3%	
Wabasca 166A	Bigstone Cree	Woods Cree		8	682.1	1,685.5	658	738	-10.8%	
Wabasca 166B	Bigstone Cree	Woods Cree		8	2,413.4	5,963.6	190	250	-24.0%	
Wabasca 166C	Bigstone Cree	Woods Cree		8	3,502.6	8,655.1	188	182	3.3%	
Wabasca 166D	Bigstone Cree	Woods Cree		8	5,817.4	14,375.1	961	885	8.6%	
Wadlin Lake 173C	Tallcree First Nation	Woodland Cree	North Peace Tribal Council	8	48.0	118.6				
White Fish Lake 128	Saddle Lake Cree	Beaver Hills Cree		6	4,542.7	11,225.3	1,310	1,188	10.3%	
William McKenzie 151K	Duncan's	Woods Cree	Western Cree Tribal Council	8	389.3	962.0				
Winefred Lake 194B	Chipewyan Prairie	Chipewyan	Athabasca Tribal Council	8	450.0	1,112.0				
Woodland Cree 226	Woodland Cree	Woodland Cree	Kee Tas Kee Now Tribal Council	8	11,660.0	28,812.5	723	706	2.4%	
Woodland Cree 227	Woodland Cree	Woodland Cree	Kee Tas Kee Now Tribal Council	8	660.0	1,630.9				
Woodland Cree 228	Woodland Cree	Woodland Cree	Kee Tas Kee Now Tribal Council	8	3,786.0	9,355.4	150	143	4.9%	
Zama Lake 210	Dene Tha'	Slavey	North Peace Tribal Council	8	2,307.2	5,701.2				

== Indian settlements ==
Name as used by Indigenous and Northern Affairs Canada	First Nation(s)	Ethnic/national group	Tribal council	Treaty	Area		Population			Notes
Name as used by Indigenous and Northern Affairs Canada	First Nation(s)	Ethnic/national group	Tribal council	Treaty	ha	acre	2016	2011	% difference	Notes
Cadotte Lake	Woodland Cree	Woodland Cree	Kee Tas Kee Now Tribal Council	8	0.0	0.0				Indian settlement
Carcajou 187				—	42.0	103.8				Indian settlement
Desmarais	Bigstone Cree	Woods Cree		8	145.0	358.3	105	129	-18.6%	Indian settlement
Fort Mackay	Fort McKay	Cree / Dene	Athabasca Tribal Council	8	953.0	2,354.9	742	562	32.0%	Indian settlement
Garden Creek	Little Red River	Woods Cree	North Peace Tribal Council	8	0.0	0.0				Indian settlement
Little Buffalo	Lubicon Lake	Woods Cree	Kee Tas Kee Now Tribal Council	8	1,326.0	3,276.6	452	387	16.8%	Indian settlement

== See also ==
- First Nations in Alberta
- List of Indian reserves in Canada
- List of communities in Alberta
- List of municipalities in Alberta
- Métis in Alberta
