= Chipewyan (disambiguation) =

Chipewyan are a Dene group of indigenous Canadian people. It can also refer to:

- Athabasca Chipewyan First Nation
- Chipewyan Prairie First Nation
- Chipewyan language
- Chipewyan Lake, a community in northern Alberta
- Indian reserves in Alberta, Canada
  - Chipewyan 201
  - Chipewyan 201A
  - Chipewyan 201B
  - Chipewyan 201C
  - Chipewyan 201D
  - Chipewyan 201E
  - Chipewyan 201F
  - Chipewyan 201G
