= Heart Lake =

Heart Lake may refer to the following places:

== Canada ==
- Heart Lake (Ontario), located in the northern end of Brampton, in Peel Region, Ontario
  - Heart Lake Secondary School, in Brampton, Ontario
  - Heart Lake Terminal, a Brampton Transit bus terminal
- Heart Lake First Nation, a First Nations band in northern Alberta
  - Heart Lake 167 and Heart Lake 167A, two Indian reserves of Heart Lake First Nation

== United States ==
- Heart Lake (Idaho), in the Sawtooth Wilderness
- Heart Lake (Soldier Mountains), in Camas County, Idaho
- Heart Lake (White Cloud Mountains), in Custer County, Idaho
- Heart Lake (Michigan)
- Heart Lake (Minnesota)
- Heart Lake (Beaverhead County, Montana), in Beaverhead County, Montana
- Heart Lake (Carbon County, Montana), in Carbon County, Montana
- Heart Lake (Lewis and Clark County, Montana), in Lewis and Clark County, Montana
- Heart Lake (Missoula County, Montana), in Missoula County, Montana
- Heart Lake (Stillwater County, Montana), in Stillwater County, Montana
- Heart Lake (New York), located in the Adirondack Park near the Adirondak Loj
- Heart Lake (Wyoming), located in Yellowstone National Park
