= Blue Quills University =

University in Alberta, Canada

University nuhelot’įne thaiyots’į nistameyimâkanak Blue Quills
- University nuhelot’įne thaiyots’į nistameyimâkanak Blue Quills
- Blue Quills First Nations College logo
- Former names: Blue Quills Education Centre, Blue Quills First Nations College
- Type: First Nations-controlled university
- Established: 1971
- Affiliations: ACCC, CCAA, AACTI, NAIIHL, FNAHLC
- President: Sherri Chisan
- Location: St. Paul, Alberta, Canada; 54.0007°N 111.3699°W
- Website: www.bluequills.ca

University nuhelot’įne thaiyots’į nistameyimâkanak Blue Quills (University nn Blue Quills, formerly Blue Quills Education Centre and Blue Quills First Nations College (BQFNC)) is a First Nations owned and operated university in Canada, the first of its kind in the country. The university is jointly owned by seven First Nation band governments: Beaver Lake, Cold Lake, Frog Lake, Whitefish Lake, Heart Lake, Kehewin, and Saddle Lake.

The institution was founded as an Indian residential school in the 1930s and was known as Blue Quills Indian Residential School before being occupied by a protest movement in 1970 and then transferred to Indigenous control in 1971. It was declared a university on September 1, 2015.

Blue Quills is a member of the National Association of Indigenous Institutes of Higher Learning and the First Nation Adult and Higher Education Consortium, a non-profit organization in Western Canada, which coordinates the efforts of its members to provide quality adult and higher education, controlled entirely by people of the First Nations. The university is not provincially chartered, unlike all other universities in Alberta but instead incorporated by federal statute. The university hosts an annual cultural camp in May.

== History ==
BQFNC was the first Indigenous controlled and operated post secondary educational institution in Canada. The brick school was built in 1931 on Blue Quills First Nation Indian Reserve and operated as a Blue Quills Indian Residential School until 1970. In July 1970 it was taken over by community members through peaceful protest and occupation. Negotiations with then Minister of Indian Affairs, Jean Chrétien, took place and agreement was signed on July 31, 1970, transferring the operations of Blue Quills to the Native Education Council. The Blue Quills First Nation College (Blue Quills Education Centre) opened in September 1971. In November 2000, the college was accredited by the First Nations Accreditation Board. In September 2015 the Blue Quills First Nation College became University nuhelotʼįne thaiyots’į nistameyimâkanak Blue Quills, a name which includes both Dene and Cree language words for the school.

== Scholarships and bursaries ==
University nuhelot’įne thaiyots’į nistameyimâkanak Blue Quills scholarships for Aboriginal and First Nations students include: Theodore R. Campbell Scholarship.

== See also ==
- List of tribal colleges and universities
- Louise Bernice Halfe, former student of the residential school
