= Blue Quill =

Blue Quill was a 19th-century First Nations chief of the Cree people in what is now Alberta. Various locations, organizations and institutions are named for him:

== Places ==
- Blue Quill, Edmonton, a neighbourhood of that city
- Blue Quill Estates, Edmonton, a neighbourhood of that city
- Blue Quills First Nation Indian Reserve, a multi-band Indian Reserve in Alberta
- Blue Quills National Wildlife Area

== Organizations ==
- Blue Quill's Band, a former band government in Alberta, now part of the Saddle Lake Cree Nation
- Blue Quills First Nations College
