= Kehewin =

Kehewin may refer to:

- Kehewin Cree Nation in northern Alberta, Canada
  - Kehewin 123, their Indian reserve
- Keheewin, Edmonton, a neighbourhood in Edmonton, Alberta
