= Duncan's First Nation =

First Nation in Alberta, Canada

- Band No. 451
- People: Woods Cree
- Treaty: Treaty 8
- Headquarters: Brownvale
- Province: Alberta

Land
- Main reserve: Duncan's 151A
- Reserve: William McKenzie 151K
- Land area: 24.261 km^{2} (9.367 sq mi)

Population (2019)
- On reserve: 144
- On other land: 2
- Off reserve: 182
- Total population: 328

Government
- Chief: Virginia Gladue
- Council: Jennifer Testawich; Keith Lawrence

Tribal Council
- Western Cree Tribal Council

Website
- duncansfirstnation.com

Duncan's First Nation is a First Nation in northwestern Alberta, Canada. It operates as an Indian band under the Indian Act representing a community of Aboriginal Canadians, in this case from the Woods Cree ethnic group. The band became a party to Treaty 8 with the Canadian Crown on July 1, 1899. Indian reserves were surveyed for the band in 1905, but the reserves were not confirmed by Order-in-Council until 1907 (eight parcels) and 1925 (two parcels). All but one reserves (#151A) were later surrendered to the Canadian government in 1928. One of them, #151K, was later returned to the band in 1965. The two remaining reserves are #151A, located 52 kilometres (32 mi) west of Peace River, Alberta and #151K, located in the McLennon/Reno area, southeast of Peace River. The two reserves comprise a total area of 2,426.1 hectares (5,995 acres), and the majority of the population lives on #151A. In 2012, the band had a registered population of 269, of whom 142 members living the band's reserves.

In the 1970s, Duncan's First Nation joined a regional council with several other bands, the Lesser Slave Lake Indian Regional Council. In 1998, however, the band withdrew from the Lesser Slave Lake council and formed the Western Cree Tribal Council along with Horse Lake First Nation and Sturgeon Lake Cree Nation, and remains a member. Duncan's is also a member of a treaty council, the Treaty 8 First Nations of Alberta.
