= Lubicon Lake =

Lubicon Lake may refer to:

- Lubicon Lake Band, a federally recognized band government
- Lubicon Lake Indian Nation, a federally unrecognized traditional government
