= Swampy Lake 236 =

Indian reserve of the Loon River First Nation in Alberta, Canada

Coordinates: 56°23′58″N 115°25′53″W

- Indian reserve
- Swampy Lake Indian Reserve No. 236
- Location in Alberta
- First Nation: Loon River
- Treaty: 8
- Country: Canada
- Province: Alberta
- Municipal district: Northern Sunrise

Area
  - Total: 14,744.4 ha (36,434 acres)
- Time zone: UTC−06:00 (Alberta Time)

Swampy Lake 236 is an Indian reserve of the Loon River First Nation in Alberta, located within Northern Sunrise County. It is 6 kilometres west of Loon Lake.
