= Moostoos =

Headman of the Sucker Creek First Nation, North America (c. 1850–1918)

Moostoos (meaning "The Buffalo", also spelled Mostos; c. 1850 – November 19, 1918), also known as Louis Willier, was headman of the Sucker Creek First Nation.

== Life ==
=== Personal life ===
Moostoos was born at the western end of Lesser Slave Lake, as the eldest of ten children of Masinigoneb and Marie Kowikkiu. He was a trapper, fisherman, and later, Chief and Headman of Sucker Creek First Nation. On November 7, 1892, he married Niyaniskipimuttew (Nanette Auger), and they had two sons, and adopted a daughter. Moostos died on November 19, 1918, at the Sucker Creek Indian Reserve during that year's influenza pandemic.

=== Participation in Treaty 8 Negotiations ===
During Treaty 8 negotiations, Moostoos and his younger brother Kinosew (Kinoosayo) spoke on behalf of the Cree at talks from June 20–22, 1899, at Willow Point, on Lesser Slave Lake.

Moostoos' negotiation style is described as conciliatory. He stressed the need for peace between indigenous peoples and settlers. It has been suggested this was in part influenced by his relationship with the Roman Catholic Church and Father Albert Lacombe, who was present during negotiations.

Moostoos is credited with the following quotes from the negotiations:

On settler encroachment: “Our country is getting broken up, I see the white man coming in, and I want to be friends. I see what he does, but it is best that we should be friends.” On education for indigenous peoples: “We must know what type of teachers the government intends to give us. Does it mean to impose on us those it likes, or will it take our opinions into account?”

A correspondent for the Edmonton Bulletin, commenting on the speaking skills of Moostoos, reportedly remarked that “he is acknowledged to be the orator of his people in this country and he certainly is.”

After negotiations finished, treaty implementation was slow, and Moostoos spent some time advocating for its implementation. In 1900, along with other Cree Headmen, Moostoos requested land for a reserve east of the Driftpile River on Lesser Slave Lake. In 1910, reserve land was granted, but was not contiguous between Cree communities involved in the negotiations. Separate reserves were established for Driftpile first nation and Sucker Creek first nation. After this, Moostoos served as de facto chief of Sucker Creek Band until his death. He is also known to have been a 'Medicine man' and practiced traditional indigenous healing methods.

=== Participation in the trial of Charles King ===
In September 1904, members of the Sucker Creek Band reported “some strange things” to a local RCMP officer, who went with Moostoos to investigate a campsite near Sucker Creek. There they discovered the remains of a body, and began an investigation that involved the draining of a nearby slough, and recovered various personal possessions.

Prospector Charles King was later charged with the murder. The trial took place in Edmonton during March 1905. Moostoos and other members of Sucker Creek Band appeared as key witnesses for the crown. The defense council as well as the Daily Edmonton Bulletin reportedly suggested that members of the Band might have been involved in the killing, despite the absence of evidence to support their position. King was convicted, though a mistrial was later declared. In June 1905, at a second trial, King was convicted again.
