= Atikameg, Alberta =

Settlement in Alberta, Canada

Coordinates: 55°54′52″N 115°38′14″W

Location of Atikameg, Alberta

Atikameg is a settlement in Alberta, Canada. It is located along Highway 750, 92 km (57 mi) north-east from High Prairie. It lies on the north-western shore of Utikuma Lake at an elevation of 685 m (2,247 ft).

Atikameg means little whitefish in Cree. The settlement is home to the Whitefish Lake First Nation and is the centre of the Utikoomak Lake 155 Indian Reserve. The Whitefish Lake Band is affiliated to the Kee Tas Kee Now Tribal Council.

The postal code for Atikameg is T0G 0C0.

== Infrastructure ==
A health care centre is operational in the community, as is a police detachment and the administration office of the Whitefish Lake Band. There is a day care, social services building and a post office. The community has both a water treatment plant and a sewage treatment plant.

The Atikameg School (K-12) serves the community with a student population of approximately 200 students. Most of the students are bused to the school from Atikameg and from Whitefish River.

== Demographics ==
The entire Utikoomak Lake 155 reserve had a population of 786 in 2006, a 3.2% decrease from 2001.
