= Alexander 134B =

Coordinates: 54°20′31″N 114°48′43″W

- Indian reserve
- Alexander Indian Reserve No. 134B
- Boundaries of Alexander 134B

- Location in Alberta
- First Nation: Alexander
- Treaty: 8
- Country: Canada
- Province: Alberta
- Municipal district: Woodlands

Area
  - Total: 3.4 ha (8.4 acres)
- Time zone: UTC−06:00 (Alberta Time)

Alexander 134B is an Indian reserve of the Alexander First Nation in Alberta, within Woodlands County. It is 36 kilometres northwest of Barrhead.

== See also ==
- Alexander 134A
- Alexander 134
