= O'Chiese 203 =

Coordinates: 52°47′49″N 115°19′19″W

- Indian reserve
- O'Chiese Indian Reserve No. 203
- Location in Alberta
- First Nation: O'Chiese First Nation
- Country: Canada
- Province: Alberta
- Municipal districts: Brazeau; Clearwater

Area
  - Land: 140.20 km^{2} (54.13 sq mi)

Population (2016)
  - Total: 789
  - Density: 5.63/km^{2} (14.6/sq mi)
- Time zone: UTC−06:00 (Alberta Time)

O'Chiese 203 is an Indian reserve in Alberta, Canada, and is one of two reserves under the administration of the O'Chiese First Nation, a Saulteaux government. It is located 119 kilometres (74 mi) northwest of Red Deer. It is at an elevation of 1,007 metres (3,304 ft). The reserve is bordered by Clearwater County to the west and east, Brazeau County to the north, and the Sunchild 202 Indian Reserve to the south.
