= Woodland Cree First Nation =

First Nation in Alberta, Canada

- Band No. 474
- People: Cree
- Treaty: Treaty 8
- Headquarters: Cadotte Lake
- Province: Alberta

Land
- Other reserves: Woodland Cree 226; Woodland Cree 227; Woodland Cree 228
- Land area: 161.06 km^{2} (62.19 sq mi)

Population (2019)
- On reserve: 814
- On other land: 6
- Off reserve: 356
- Total population: 1176

Government
- Chief: Isaac Laboucan-Avirom

Tribal Council
- Kee Tas Kee Now Tribal Council

Website
- woodlandcree.net

The Woodland Cree First Nation is a First Nation in Alberta, Canada, in Northern Sunrise County northeast of the town of Peace River, encompassing the hamlet of Cadotte Lake. As of September 2010, 986 people are registered in Woodland Cree First Nation, 697 of them on 16,106 hectarces of reserve.

== History ==
Woodland Cree First Nation was recognized by Canada on August 28, 1989. On August 20, 1991, it signed a land entitlement treaty with the federal government and received three reserves. In September 2019, they became a signatory of the Buffalo Treaty.

== Reserves ==
Woodland Cree First Nation reserves
Reserve	Local Name	Location	Area(hectares)
Woodland Cree 226	Cadotte Lake	48 km NE of Peace River	11660.0
Woodland Cree 227	Golden Lake	60 km NE of Peace River	660.0
Woodland Cree 228	Marten Lake	75 km NE of Peace River	3786.0

== Notable people ==
- Angelique Merasty (1924–1996), birchbark biting artist

== See also ==
- First Nations in Alberta
- List of Indian reserves in Alberta
- List of First Nations peoples
- Indian Act
- List of Aboriginal communities in Canada
