= Loon Prairie 237 =

Coordinates: 56°49′42″N 115°23′51″W

- Indian reserve
- Loon Prairie Indian Reserve No. 237
- Location in Alberta
- First Nation: Loon River
- Treaty: 8
- Country: Canada
- Province: Alberta
- Municipal district: Northern Sunrise

Area
  - Total: 259.6 ha (641 acres)
- Time zone: UTC−06:00 (Alberta Time)

Loon Prairie 237 is an Indian reserve of the Loon River First Nation in Alberta, located within Northern Sunrise County. It is 30 kilometres north of Loon Lake.
