= Yellowhead Tribal Council =

First Nation council in Alberta, Canada

Yellowhead Tribal Council is a tribal council representing four First Nation communities in north-central and western Alberta, Canada. The council is based in Edmonton, Alberta.

== Member First Nations ==
Current First Nation members are:

- Alexander First Nation
- Alexis Nakota Sioux Nation
- O'Chiese First Nation
- Sunchild First Nation
