= Loon Lake 235 =

Coordinates: 56°32′05″N 115°22′13″W

- Indian reserve
- Loon Lake Indian Reserve No. 235
- Location in Alberta
- First Nation: Loon River
- Treaty: 8
- Country: Canada
- Province: Alberta
- Municipal districts: Northern Sunrise; Opportunity

Area
  - Total: 6,902.3 ha (17,056 acres)

Population (2016)
  - Total: 555
  - Density: 8.04/km^{2} (20.8/sq mi)
- Time zone: UTC−06:00 (Alberta Time)

Loon Lake 235 is an Indian reserve of the Loon River First Nation in Alberta, located within Northern Sunrise County and the Municipal District of Opportunity No. 17. It is 5 kilometres southwest of Loon Lake. In the 2016 Canadian Census, it recorded a population of 555 living in 147 of its 157 total private dwellings.
