= Allan Adam =

Canadian indigenous leader

Chief of the Athabasca Chipewyan First Nation
- Incumbent
- Assumed office October 2007

Personal details
- Born: 1966 or 1967 (age 58–59)

Chief Allan Adam is the Chief of the Athabasca Chipewyan First Nation in northern Alberta, Canada. He has served as Chief since October 2007. Before becoming Chief, Adam had served as a band councillor since 2003, with responsibility for housing issues.

== Political views ==
In 2015, Adam, along with the leaders of several other First Nations, spoke out against the First Nations Financial Transparency Act.

== Environmental views ==
Adam has advocated against oil sands development, having coordinated efforts involving prominent climate activists such as Greta Thunberg and Leonardo DiCaprio.

In 2014, Adam brought suit on his own behalf and on behalf of Athabasca Chipewyan First Nation against Canada's Minister of Environment and Shell Canada in relation to Shell's proposed expansion of the Jackpine Mine oil sands project, located near Fort McMurray, Alberta on the lands of Athabasca Chipewyan First Nation. Adam alleged that Canada had breached its duty to consult and accommodate by allowing the proposed expansion to go forward in spite of significant environmental impacts from the project. The Federal Court dismissed his action.

In 2015, the Athabasca Chipewyan First Nation, under Adam's leadership, brought a legal challenge against the Grand Rapids pipeline, then under construction by TC Energy.

In August 2018, Adam was the keynote speaker at the Arctic Indigenous Investment Conference held in Yellowknife, Northwest Territories, where he spoke in favour of developments such as the Trans Mountain pipeline.

== 2020 arrest ==
In June 2020, a 12-minute police video was released showing an officer of the Royal Canadian Mounted Police tackling Allan to the ground, punching him in the head and putting him in a choke hold after Adam repeatedly antagonizing and disobeying the first police officer's instructions to remain in the vehicle while conducting an investigation into a possible impaired driver. Adam had been charged with resisting arrest and assaulting a peace officer in connection with the incident, but the charges were later dropped.

The video drew media attention to systemic racism in the policing of Indigenous communities in Canada. Canadian Prime Minister Justin Trudeau expressed 'shock' and ordered investigations.
