= Indian settlement =

A census subdivision in Canada

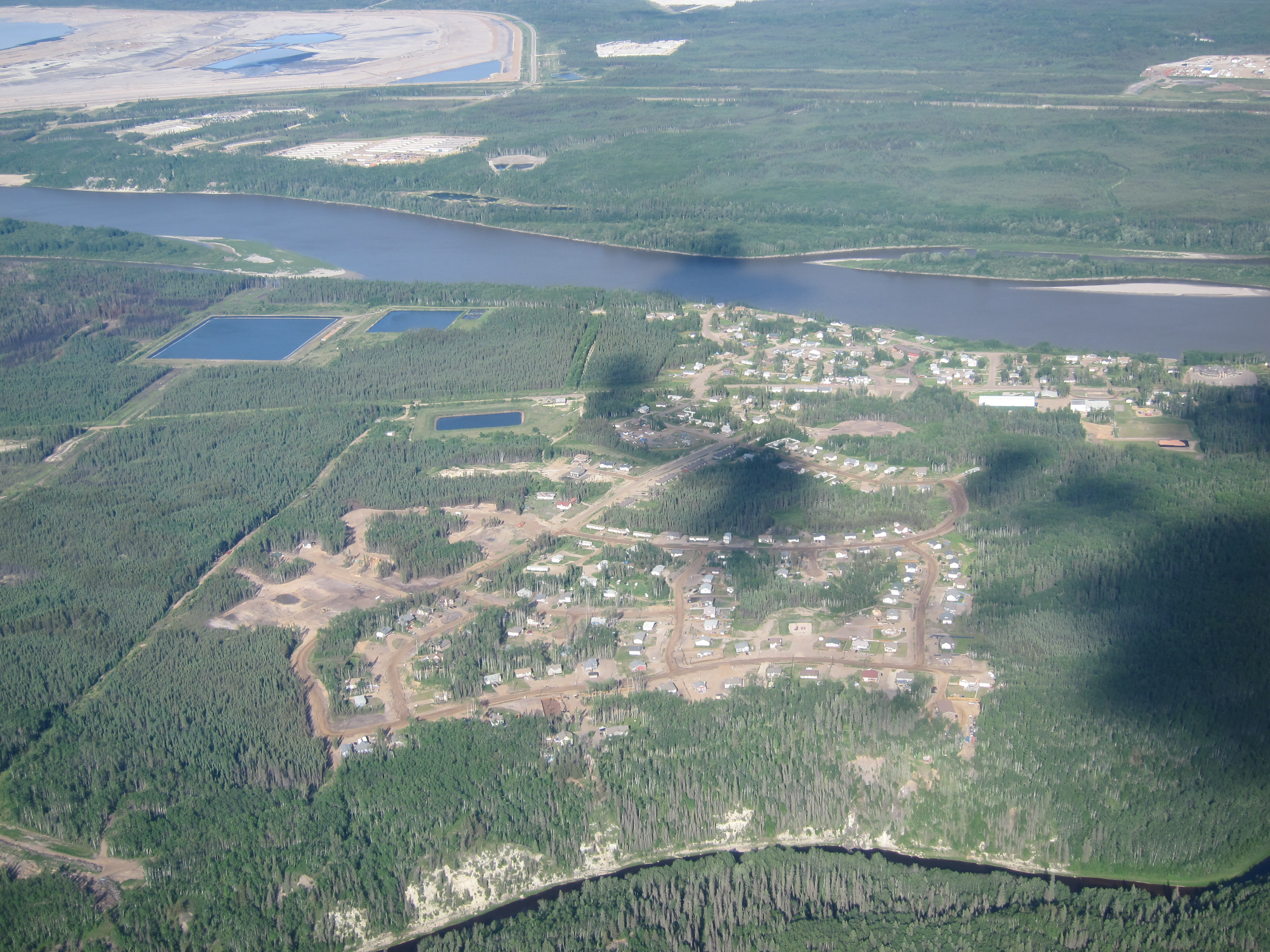
Fort McKay, Alberta from the air

An Indian settlement is a census subdivision outlined by the Canadian government Department of Aboriginal Affairs and Northern Development Canada for census purposes. These areas have at least 10 status Indian or non-status Indian people who live more or less permanently in the given area. They are usually located on Crown land owned by the federal or provincial government and have not been set apart for the use and the benefit of an Indian band, as is the case with Indian reserves.

== See also ==
- Indian Land Claims Settlements
- List of Indian settlements in Alberta
- List of Indian settlements in Quebec
