= Marvin Francis =

Cree Canadian poet

Marvin Francis (1955–2005) was a Cree poet from Winnipeg, Manitoba best known for his book-length poem City Treaty published by Turnstone Press.

== Life ==
Francis was born on the Heart Lake First Nation in Northern Alberta and lived in Edmonton. After quitting high school, he travelled across Canada and worked on various industrial jobs, including on oil rigs and for the railroads. Eventually he attended the University of Winnipeg, where he wrote radio plays and short stories in addition to his poetry.

He was pursuing his doctoral studies in English when he died of cancer in 2005.

== Poetry ==
Francis is known for integrating elements of spoken word poetry and performance into his writing, drawing on his experience as a poet, playwright, actor, artist and theater director. In 2002 he published his book-length satiric poem "City Treaty," which engages with "globalization, neoliberalism, and narratives of cultural identity" as it deals with the "ongoing links of treaty trickery with the everyday discourses of global capitalism." The long poem has been called "a streetwise anti-globalization manifesto for the indigenous world" and "an exuberant collection of songs, interventions, jokes, maps, histories and manifestos."

"City Treaty" received the John Hirsch Award for Most Promising Manitoba Writer in 2002.

His poem "Edgewalker" has been called an important work in understanding the "ideological boundaries that often separate the beneficiaries of colonialism from those who are objectified and impoverished by it."

A second volume of his poetry, Bush Camp, was published posthumously in 2008.

== Works ==
- City Treaty (Turnstone, 2002) ISBN 978-0888012685
- Bush Camp (Turnstone, 2008) ISBN 978-0888013248
