= Harmon Valley, Alberta =

Harmon Valley
- Location of Harmon Valley in Alberta
- Coordinates: 56.11666°N 116.83329°W
- Country: Canada
- Province: Alberta
- Census division: No. 17
- Municipal district: Northern Sunrise County

Government
  - Type: Unincorporated
  - Governing body: Northern Sunrise County Council
- Elevation: 635 m (2,083 ft)
- Time zone: UTC-7 (MST)

Harmon Valley is an unincorporated community in northern Alberta, Canada.

The community was named for Daniel Harmon, a fur trader.

The Harmon Valley Fair Grounds is hosts to the Harmon Valley Quad Rally.

== Administration ==
The community is located in census division No. 17. It is administered by Northern Sunrise County, and is represented by the Ward 1 - Harmon Valley / Reno councillor.

== Geography ==
The community is located in the Heart River valley, approximately 25 km (16 mi) east of the Village of Nampa. It has an elevation of 635 meters (2,083 ft).

The Harmon Member of the Peace River Formation, a stratigraphic unit of the Western Canadian Sedimentary Basin is named for the community.

== See also ==
- List of communities in Alberta
