= Puskiakiwenin 122 =

Coordinates: 53°56′38″N 110°26′06″W

- Indian reserve
- Puskiakiwenin Indian Reserve No. 122
- Boundaries of Puskiakiwenin 122

- Location in Alberta
- First Nation: Frog Lake
- Treaty: 6
- Country: Canada
- Province: Alberta
- Municipal districts: St. Paul; Bonnyville

Area
  - Total: 10,339.1 ha (25,548 acres)

Population (2016)
  - Total: 531
  - Density: 5.14/km^{2} (13.3/sq mi)
- Time zone: UTC−06:00 (Alberta Time)

Puskiakiwenin 122 is an Indian reserve in Alberta. It is located 59 kilometres (37 mi) southwest of Cold Lake. It is at an elevation of 612 metres (2,008 ft). It belongs to the Frog Lake First Nation, a Cree nation.
