= Cadotte Lake =

- Hamlet
- Location of Cadotte Lake Cadotte Lake (Canada)
- Coordinates: 56°28′02″N 116°22′51″W
- Country: Canada
- Province: Alberta
- Region: Northern Alberta
- Census division: 17
- Municipal district: Northern Sunrise County

Government
  - Type: Unincorporated
  - Governing body: Northern Sunrise County Council

Area (2021)
  - Land: 1.39 km^{2} (0.54 sq mi)

Population (2021)
  - Total: 23
  - Density: 16.6/km^{2} (43/sq mi)
- Time zone: UTC−06:00 (Alberta Time)
- Area codes: 780, 587, 825

Cadotte Lake is an unincorporated community in Northern Sunrise County in northern Alberta, Canada. It is on the northern shore of the homonymous lake, along Highway 986, 79 km (49 mi) east of Peace River and 68 km (42 mi) west of the Bicentennial Highway (Highway 88).

It straddles the boundary between the Woodland Cree First Nation Reserve 226 and Northern Sunrise County. The western part of the community, inside the reserve, is known as the Cadotte Lake Indian Settlement, while the eastern part, in Northern Sunrise County, is designated a hamlet.

Cadotte Airport is located 2.7 km (1.7 mi) east of the settlement.

The community is named for the nearby lake, as is the out-flowing Cadotte River, which lends its name to the Cadotte Member of the Peace River Formation, a stratigraphical unit of the Western Canadian Sedimentary Basin.

== Demographics ==
Population history of Cadotte Lake
Year	Pop.	±%
1966	39	—
1971	192	+392.3%
1976	135	−29.7%
1981	157	+16.3%
1986	241	+53.5%
1991	275	+14.1%
1991A	276	+0.4%
1996	40	−85.5%
2001	19	−52.5%
2006	0	−100.0%
2011	39	—
2016	5	−87.2%
2016R	61	+1120.0%
2021	23	−62.3%
Following a 1991 land claim in favour of the Woodland Cree First Nation, the majority of the Hamlet of Cadotte Lake was transferred to the Woodland Cree 226 reserve. Source: Statistics Canada

In the 2021 Census of Population conducted by Statistics Canada, Cadotte Lake had a population of 23 living in 8 of its 13 total private dwellings, a change of −62.3% from its 2016 population of 61. With a land area of 1.39 km^{2} (0.54 sq mi), it had a population density of 16.5/km^{2} (42.9/sq mi) in 2021.

As a designated place in the 2016 Census of Population conducted by Statistics Canada, Cadotte Lake had a population of 5 living in 1 of its 14 total private dwellings, a change of −87.2% from its 2011 population of 39. With a land area of 1.66 km^{2} (0.64 sq mi), it had a population density of 3.0/km^{2} (7.8/sq mi) in 2016.

== See also ==
- List of communities in Alberta
- List of designated places in Alberta
- List of hamlets in Alberta
