= Horse Lakes 152B =

Coordinates: 55°21′07″N 119°41′49″W

- Indian reserve
- Horse Lakes Indian Reserve No. 152B
- Location in Alberta
- First Nation: Horse Lake First Nation
- Country: Canada
- Province: Alberta
- Municipal district: Grande Prairie

Area
  - Land: 14.33 km^{2} (5.53 sq mi)

Population (2016)
  - Total: 469
  - Density: 32.7/km^{2} (85/sq mi)
- Time zone: UTC−06:00 (Alberta Time)

Horse Lakes 152B is an Indian reserve of the Horse Lake First Nation in Alberta. It is 60 km (37 mi) northwest of Grande Prairie at an elevation of 774 m (2,539 ft).

== Geography ==
The locality of Horse Lake is on the Horse Lakes 152B reserve. The reserve, which is 3.6 km (2.2 mi) from Alberta Highway 43 along Range Road 120 and Township Road 743, encompasses most of the lake that is eponymous to the locality.

== Demographics ==
In the 2011 Canadian Census Horse Lakes 152B has a population of 402 with 111 private dwellings. It is a 20.0% increase from the 2006 Canadian Census with a population of 335.
