= Woodland Cree 227 =

Coordinates: 56°32′45″N 116°23′21″W

- Indian reserve
- Woodland Cree Indian Reserve No. 227
- Location in Alberta
- First Nation: Woodland Cree
- Treaty: 8
- Country: Canada
- Province: Alberta
- Municipal district: Northern Sunrise

Area
  - Total: 660 ha (1,600 acres)
- Time zone: UTC−06:00 (Alberta Time)

Woodland Cree 227 is an Indian reserve of the Woodland Cree First Nation in Alberta, located within Northern Sunrise County. It is 60 kilometres northeast of Peace River.
