= Marie Reine =

- Hamlet
- Location of Marie Reine in Alberta
- Coordinates: 56.0764°N 117.2894°W
- Country: Canada
- Province: Alberta
- Census division: No. 19
- Municipal district: Northern Sunrise County
- Established: 20 March 1987

Government
  - Type: Unincorporated
  - Governing body: Northern Sunrise County Council
  - Reeve: Agnes Knudsen
  - Ward 3 Councillor: Ricky Boucher

Population (2010)
  - Total: 67
- Time zone: UTC−06:00 (Alberta Time)

Marie Reine is a hamlet in northwest Alberta, Canada within Northern Sunrise County. It is located approximately 18 km (11 mi) south of the Town of Peace River on four quarter sections split by Highway 744.

The French Canadian community got its start in 1949-1952 when settlers from Quebec and France migrated west for a better future. The hamlet has a unique community plan laid out by L’Abbe Pierre Paul Pothier where each lot is a twenty-acre strip abutting Highway 744.

== Demographics ==
The population of Marie Reine according to the 2010 municipal census conducted by Northern Sunrise County is 67.

== Amenities ==
The hamlet has a community hall and a post office.

== See also ==
- List of communities in Alberta
- List of hamlets in Alberta
