= Utikoomak Lake 155B =

Coordinates: 56°02′23″N 115°36′00″W

- Indian reserve
- Utikoomak Lake Indian Reserve No. 155B
- Location in Alberta
- First Nation: Whitefish Lake
- Treaty: 8
- Country: Canada
- Province: Alberta
- Municipal district: Northern Sunrise

Area
  - Total: 502.6 ha (1,242 acres)
- Time zone: UTC−06:00 (Alberta Time)

Utikoomak Lake 155B is an Indian reserve of the Whitefish Lake First Nation in Alberta, located within Northern Sunrise County. It is fifty-five kilometres (34 mi) northeast of High Prairie.
