= Cadotte River =

Location
- Country: Canada
- Province: Alberta

Physical characteristics
- Source
  - coordinates: 56.26133°N 116.37062°W
  - elevation: 700 meters (2,300 ft)
- Mouth
  - location: Peace River
  - coordinates: 56.72327°N 117.17623°W
  - elevation: 305 meters (1,001 ft)

Basin features
- River system: Peace River

The Cadotte River is a tributary of the Peace River in Northern Alberta, Canada.

The river gives the name to the Cadotte Member, a stratigraphical unit of the Western Canadian Sedimentary Basin.

== Course ==
The Cadotte River forms in Northern Alberta, north of High Prairie, at an elevation of 700 meters (2,300 ft). It flows north forming a series of small lakes along its course, then empties into the Cadotte Lake, which also receives the waters of Marten River from the east. Cadotte River flows out from the northern shore of Cadotte Lake, immediately west from the settlement of Cadotte Lake and Cadotte Airport, at an elevation of 580 meters (1,900 ft). The river flows westwards and is crossed by Highway 989/688 before it receives the waters of Otter River from the Buffalo Head Hills. It continues west, then turns north and flows parallel to the Peace River, also receiving the Little Cadotte River from the west. It empties into the Peace River as a right tributary in the Cadotte/Peace River Remote Provincial Forest Recreation Area, 50 kilometers (31 mi) north from the town of Peace River. It ends at an elevation of 305 meters (1,001 ft), some 56 kilometers (35 mi) north-west from its origin.

== Tributaries ==
- Cadotte Lake
  - Marten River
- Otter River
  - Golden Lake
  - Otter Lakes
- Simon Lakes
- Little Cadotte River
  - Jackpine Creek

== See also ==
- List of rivers of Alberta
