= Three Creeks, Alberta =

Three Creeks
- Location of Three Creeks in Alberta
- Coordinates: 56.35025°N 117.08336°W
- Country: Canada
- Province: Alberta
- Census division: No. 17
- Municipal district: Northern Sunrise County

Government
  - Type: Unincorporated
  - Governing body: Northern Sunrise County Council
- Elevation: 540 m (1,770 ft)
- Time zone: UTC-7 (MST)

Three Creeks is an unincorporated community in northern Alberta, Canada.

The name of the community is a reference to the three creeks that flow west through the community into the Peace River, among them being Wesley Creek and Carmon Creek.

The Three Creeks Provincial Grazing Reserve provides hunting grounds for moose and deer.

== Administration ==
The community is located in census division No. 17. It is administered by Northern Sunrise County and is represented by the Ward 5-Three Creeks councillor.

== Geography ==
The community is located along Highway 688, approximately 25 km (16 mi) northeast of the Town of Peace River. It has an elevation of 540 m (1772 ft).

== See also ==
- List of communities in Alberta
