= Utikoomak Lake 155A =

Coordinates: 55°56′09″N 115°22′15″W

- Indian reserve
- Utikoomak Lake Indian Reserve No. 155A
- Location in Alberta
- First Nation: Whitefish Lake
- Treaty: 8
- Country: Canada
- Province: Alberta
- Municipal district: Northern Sunrise

Area
  - Total: 1,041 ha (2,570 acres)

Population (2016)
  - Total: 127
  - Density: 12.2/km^{2} (31.6/sq mi)
- Time zone: UTC−06:00 (Alberta Time)

Utikoomak Lake 155A is an Indian reserve of the Whitefish Lake First Nation in Alberta, located within Northern Sunrise County. In the 2016 Canadian Census, it recorded a population of 127 living in 29 of its 34 total private dwellings.
