= Woodland Cree 228 =

Coordinates: 56°29′07″N 116°04′11″W

- Indian reserve
- Woodland Cree Indian Reserve No. 228
- Location in Alberta
- First Nation: Woodland Cree
- Treaty: 8
- Country: Canada
- Province: Alberta
- Municipal district: Northern Sunrise

Area
  - Total: 3,786 ha (9,360 acres)

Population (2016)
  - Total: 150
  - Density: 4.0/km^{2} (10/sq mi)
- Time zone: UTC−06:00 (Alberta Time)

Woodland Cree 228 is an Indian reserve of the Woodland Cree First Nation in Alberta, located within Northern Sunrise County. It is 75 kilometres northeast of Peace River and just northeast of Little Buffalo. In the 2016 Canadian Census, it recorded a population of 150 living in 33 of its 36 total private dwellings.
