= William McKenzie 151K =

Coordinates: 56°00′21″N 116°51′58″W

- Indian reserve
- William McKenzie Indian Reserve No. 151K
- Location in Alberta
- First Nation: Duncan's
- Treaty: 8
- Country: Canada
- Province: Alberta
- Municipal district: Northern Sunrise

Area
  - Total: 389.3 ha (962 acres)
- Time zone: UTC−06:00 (Alberta Time)

William McKenzie 151K is an Indian reserve of the Duncan's First Nation in Alberta, located within Northern Sunrise County. It is 33 kilometres north of McLennan.
