= Kapaweʼno First Nation =

First Nation in Alberta, Canada

- Band No. 452
- ᑲᐹᐏᐣ kapâwin
- Treaty: Treaty 8
- Headquarters: Grouard
- Province: Alberta

Land
- Other reserves: Kapawe'no 150B; Kapawe'no 150C; Kapawe'no 150D; Kapawe'no 229; Kapawe'no 230; Kapawe'no 231
- Land area: 15.627 km^{2} (6.034 sq mi)

Population (2019)
- On reserve: 130
- On other land: 10
- Off reserve: 253
- Total population: 393

Government
- Chief: Sydney Halcrow
- Council: Debbie Chalifoux: Pamela Halcrow

Tribal Council
- Lesser Slave Lake Indian Regional Council

Website
- kapaweno.com

The Kapaweʼno First Nation (Cree: ᑲᐹᐏᐣ, kapâwin) is a band government in Alberta, Canada. It is headquartered at Grouard, Alberta, which is near High Prairie.

== Indian Reserves ==
Six Indian reserves are governed by the band:

- Kapawe'no First Nation Indian Reserve No. 150B, 8 kilometres (5.0 mi) northwest/north of Lesser Slave Lake, 29.60 hectares (73.1 acres)
- Kapawe'no First Nation Indian Reserve No. 150C, north of Buffalo Bay and 17 miles (27 km) northeast of High Prairie, Township Partial 76, Range 15 W5M, 21 hectares (52 acres)
- Kapawe'no First Nation Indian Reserve No. 150D, 13 kilometres (8.1 mi) northwest/north of Lesser Slave Lake, 390.10 hectares (964.0 acres)
- Kapawe'no First Nation Indian Reserve No. 229, 27 kilometres (17 mi) northeast of High Prairie at the northwest corner of Lesser Slave Lake, 129 hectares (320 acres)
- Kapawe'no First Nation Indian Reserve No. 230, 25 kilometres (16 mi) northeast of High Prairie at the northwest corner of Lesser Slave Lake, 846 hectares (2,090 acres)
- Kapawe'no First Nation Indian Reserve No. 231, on north shore of Lesser Slave Lake, approximately 86 kilometres (53 mi) north of Swan Hills, Alberta, 147 hectares (360 acres)
