= Heart Lake 167 =

Coordinates: 54°59′56″N 111°30′40″W

- Indian reserve
- Heart Lake Indian Reserve No. 167
- Location in Alberta
- First Nation: Heart Lake First Nation
- Country: Canada
- Province: Alberta
- Municipal district: Lac La Biche

Area
  - Land: 47.54 km^{2} (18.36 sq mi)

Population (2016)
  - Total: 184
  - Density: 3.87/km^{2} (10.0/sq mi)
- Time zone: UTC−06:00 (Alberta Time)
- Website: heartlakefirstnation.com

Heart Lake 167 is an Indian reserve of the Heart Lake First Nation in Alberta. It is located 104 kilometres (65 mi) northwest of Cold Lake. It is at an elevation of 599 metres (1,965 ft).
