= Chipewyan Prairie First Nation =

First Nation bands government in Alberta, Canada

- Band No. 470
- Tł'ógh tëlı́ dënesųłı̨ne
- People: Athabascan
- Province: Alberta

Land
- Main reserve: Janvier 194
- Reserves: Cowper Lake Indian Reserve 194A; Winefred Lake 194B
- Land area: 30.8 km^{2} (11.9 sq mi)

Population
- On reserve: 395
- Off reserve: 576
- Total population: 983

Government
- Chief: Vern Janvier
- Council size: 3

Tribal Council
- Athabasca Tribal Council

The Chipewyan Prairie First Nation (Chipewyan: Tł'ógh tëlı́ dënesųłı̨ne) is a First Nations band government located in northeast Alberta south of Fort McMurray.

It is a member of the Athabasca Tribal Council and a Treaty 8 nation. The Athabasca Tribal Council represents 5 First Nation bands in northeast Alberta.

== Demographics ==
As of August 2016 the Chipewyan Prairie First Nation (Tł'ógh tëlı́ dënesųłı̨ne) ca. 31 km^{2} had a total population of 923 with 390 members living on reserve and 533 members living off-reserve.

== Reserves ==
- Cowper Lake 194A on the north shore of Cowper Lake is 143 hectares.
- Janvier 194 the largest territory with 2486.70 hectares and the most populous with 295 residents in 2011 is 97 km southwest of Fort McMurray. 145 of the residents chose Dene as their mother tongue in 2011.
- Winefred Lake 194B (Ɂuldáze1 tué) on the north end of Winefred Lake is 450 hectares.

== See also ==
- Chipewyan people
- Chipewyan language
- List of Indian reserves in Alberta
