= Kapawe'no 150B =

Coordinates: 55°32′54″N 116°09′00″W

Kapawe'no 150B formerly Freeman 150B
- Indian reserve
- Kapawe'no Indian Reserve No. 150B
- Location in Alberta
- First Nation: Kapawe'no
- Treaty: 8
- Country: Canada
- Province: Alberta
- Municipal district: Big Lakes

Area
  - Total: 29.6 ha (73 acres)

Population (2016)
  - Total: 154
  - Density: 520/km^{2} (1,350/sq mi)
- Time zone: UTC−06:00 (Alberta Time)

Kapawe'no 150B, historically known as Freeman 150B, is an Indian reserve of the Kapawe'no First Nation in Alberta, located within Big Lakes County. It is 8 kilometers northwest of Lesser Slave Lake. In the 2016 Canadian Census, it recorded a population of 154 living in of its 45 total private dwellings.
