= Clear Hills 152C =

Indian reserve in Alberta, Canada

Coordinates: 56°31′49″N 118°47′56″W

- Indian reserve
- Clear Hills Indian Reserve No. 152C
- Location in Alberta
- First Nation: Horse Lake
- Treaty: 8
- Country: Canada
- Province: Alberta
- Municipal district: Clear Hills

Area
  - Total: 1,547.1 ha (3,823 acres)

Population (2016)
  - Total: 0
  - Density: 0.0/km^{2} (0.0/sq mi)
- Time zone: UTC−06:00 (Alberta Time)

Clear Hills 152C is an Indian reserve of the Horse Lake First Nation in Alberta, located within Clear Hills County. It is 56 kilometres northwest of Fairview. In the 2016 Canadian Census, it recorded a population of 0 living in 1 of its 5 total private dwellings.
