= Alexander First Nation =

First Nations band government

Coordinates: 53°48′41″N 113°57′37″W

- Band No. 438
- ᑭᐳᐦᑕᑲᐤ; Kipohtakaw
- People: Cree
- Treaty: Treaty 6
- Headquarters: Morinville
- Province: Alberta

Land
- Main reserve: Alexander 134
- Reserves: Alexander 134A; Alexander 134B
- Land area: 95.874 km^{2} (37.017 sq mi)

Population (January 2022)
- On reserve: 1083
- On other land: 81
- Off reserve: 1295
- Total population: 2378

Government
- Chief: George Arcand (Jr)
- Council: Audra Arcand; Christopher Arcand; Heather Jennings; Kevin Arcand; Marty Arcand; Scott Burnstick

Tribal Council
- Yellowhead Tribal Council

Website
- AlexanderFN.com

Alexander First Nation (Cree: Kipohtakaw / ᑭᐳᐦᑕᑲᐤ) is a First Nations band government, headquartered 17 kilometres (11 mi) west of Morinville, Alberta. This First Nation is part of the Cree ethno-linguistic group, is a member of the Yellowhead Tribal Council (a regional grouping of several bands), and is party to Treaty 6. The band controls three Indian reserves: Alexander 134, Alexander 134A, and Alexander 134B. The main reserve is bordered by Sturgeon County and Lac Ste. Anne County.

== Population ==
As of October 2019, Alexander First Nation had 2,263 official members, and an on-reserve population of 1,057. As of March 2017, the First Nation had 2,500 band members. At the time, the population on the reserve was growing at a rate 2.5 times that of the non-First Nations populations in the area. In 1998, the Nation had 1,343 official members.

== Lands ==
In the reserve land provision of Treaty 6, which was signed in 1877, the Alexander First Nation was promised 128 acres per citizen in a land entitlement agreement. Census issues later resulted in a shortfall of land, and a claim was accepted by Canada in 1992 after First Nation research demonstrated the shortfall. At a formal ceremony in October 1998 at the Alexander First Nation Community Hall, the government of Canada, the government of Alberta, and the Alexander First Nation announced the fulfillment of Treaty 6. Alexander First Nation was given an additional 6,130 hectares (15,140 acres) of reserve land and $10 million was put into a trust to be used "solely for the purchase of land and the long-term benefit and use of Alexander and its members."

The Alexander First Nation operates three reservations:

- Alexander 134
- Alexander 134A
- Alexander 134B

== Government ==
=== Chiefs ===
List of historic chiefs:

- Alexander Arcand (1877–1914)
- Edward Arcand (1914–1936)
- Emile Burnstick (1936–1937)
- Alexis Arcand (1937–1950)
- Adam Auigbelle (1950–1955)
- John Gladue (1955–1959)
- Fred Arcand (1959–1961)
- Sr. Henry Paul (1961–1963)
- James Arcand (1963–1965)
- Peter Lafleche (Aug.1965–Oct.1965)
- Henry Paul (1965–1969)
- Alex Auigbelle (1969–1971)
- George Lafleche (1971–1973)
- Fred Arcand Sr. (1973–1976
- James Arcand (February 1977–September 1977)
- Leo Bruno (1977–1979)
- Stanley Arcand (1979–1986)
- Allan Paul (1986–1990)
- Stanley Arcand (1990–1999)
- Victoria Arcand (1999–2005)
- Raymand Arcand (2005–2008)
- Allan Paul (2008–2011)
- Herbert Arcand (2011–2014)
- Kurt Burnstick (2014–August 2017)
- no chief (August 2017–October 2017)
- Kurt Burnstick (October 2017–August 2020)
- George Arcand (Jr) (September 2020 – Present)

=== Elections ===
In 2011, voter eligibility rules at the First Nation were challenged as discriminatory, as First Nation members not living on the reservation were not allowed to vote.

The results of a 13 July 2017 election saw Burnstick re-elected, with those results overturned the following month by an appeal board that ruled that "a regulation requiring the unanimous consent of chief and council for an early election call had been violated." After the quashed election results, there was no elected council in place as of 31 August 2017. In September 2017, there was a court application to delay an upcoming election, with the intent of changing rules so off-reserve band members could vote. On 30 September 2017, a judge rejected the application, allowing the election to proceed. In October 2017, Kurt Burnstick was re-elected as chief, winning 171 of 470 ballots cast. Opponent Armand Arcand received 167 votes, and Stanley Arcand Junior received 128. The result proved controversial, with a group arguing that rules forbidding off-reserve members from voting as discriminatory. At the time, around half of the 2,223 members of the First Nation lived off the reserve.

=== Social policy ===
The nation's stated mission is "To protect our Inherent Treaty Rights through tactical initiatives, community enhancement, law development and continuous improvement."

Resources and support for the community are regulated by Alexander First Nation Social Development. The Wapski Mahikan Society was provided to support children and families "within the society's jurisdiction." In March 2019, the Alexander First Nation in Alberta signed a memorandum of understanding with the child services department of Alberta, to give the nation more say in "how their children are cared for."

== Economy and finances ==
In September 2016, CBC News reported that some residents on the reserve had been waiting on power poles and running water for six years, with three prior chiefs and councils saying there was no funds to extend power lines. After "over 30 years" of concern over financial irregularities by community members, on 10 March 2016, band councillors voted to appoint the accounting firm Meyers Norris Penny to audit the employment activities of past and present elected officials and staff. The audit, performed at the request of then Chief Kurt Burnstick, scrutinized activities from 2013 until 2015, with findings presented to the band council on 4 August 2016. Meyers Norris Penny found $2.1 million in "unexplained payments" made to a former chief and administrative staff, and the document, which leaked to CBC, said that "about half of the unexplained amounts, totalling more than $1 million, were paid to former chief Herbert Arcand and current tribal chief administrator Alphonse Arcand," with other funds earmarked for personal vacations and casinos. Arcand and Arcand disputed the findings, calling the report incomplete and one-sided.

According to CBC, their coverage of the audit in September 2016 had "prompted band members with similar complaints from other reserves to speak out across the country" by January 2017. As a result of the report, it was reported that some members of the nation were "asking for help from the police and the courts," and in August 2016, a criminal complaint was made to the RCMP. In January 2017, three band members sued their former chief, a current councillor and an administrator, in the Court of Queen's Bench in Edmonton on 21 December 2016. The suit cited the $2 million in unexplained payments to Alphonse Arcand, Allan Paul, and former chief Herbert Arcand, alleging "illegal and improper acts" and "unlawful abuse" of positions.

In July 2017, Indigenous and Northern Affairs Canada reported that $5.3 million in band payments at Alexander lacked sufficient documentation, between April 2010 and March 2016. The audit, performed by Ernst & Young, calculated $2.5 million of those funds coming from INA, with large unsupported funds going to Burnstick and Alphonse Arcand. At the band's request, on 11 September 2017, the Indigenous Relations and Northern Affairs in Ottawa asserted that a "third-party co-manager" was "working to sort out" finances at Alexander First Nation.

=== Pipeline negotiations ===
Prior to 2013, Pembina Pipeline began negotiating with the First Nation as to placing a nearby pipeline, with the community supportive. Burnstick was elected chief in mid-2013, and according to Pembina, began engaging in talks over benefits with the company without the knowledge of the First Nation. After a three-year regulatory and legal battle with Burnstick, Pembina decided to cease negotiations and build around the reserve. In March 2017, members of the Alexander First Nation accused chief Burnstick of costing the community jobs and revenue with the failed negotiations.

== Assault trials ==
As of September 2016, Kurt Burnstick was being pressured to resign as chief after facing three sexual assault charges concerning incidents from 2015 and 1985. The community group Alexander Women Warriors pushed for Burnstick to step down, as did dozens of people a rally in September 2016. Burnstick refused and imposed what the Edmonton Journal described as a "total media blackout". In January 2017, a trial was held following sexual-assault allegations against Burnstick. The judge said there was not enough evidence to convict, and Burnstick was acquitted of the first charge on 10 January 2017. He was acquitted of the other two charged in October 2018, after a judge was left with reasonable doubt.
