= O'Chiese First Nation =

Saulteaux First Nation in Alberta

Coordinates: 52°40′30″N 115°18′07″W

- Band No. 431
- People: Anishinaabe
- Treaty: Treaty 6
- Headquarters: Rocky Mountain House
- Province: Alberta

Land
- Main reserve: O'Chiese 203
- Reserve: O'Chiese Cemetery 203A
- Land area: 141.32 km^{2} (54.56 sq mi)

Population (2026)
- On reserve: 1027
- Off reserve: 551
- Total population: 1578

Government
- Chief: Ray “Douglas” Beaverbones

Tribal Council
- Yellowhead Tribal Council

Website
- ochiese.ca

The O'Chiese First Nation (/oʊˈtʃiːz/) is a Saulteaux First Nation in Alberta, Canada. The First Nation's homeland is the 14,131.9 ha (34,921-acre) O'Chiese 203 Indian reserve, approximately 52 km northwest of Rocky Mountain House. Also reserved is the O'Chiese Cemetery 203A. As of August 2026, the First Nation had a population of 1,578 registered people, of which the on-reserve population was 1,027 people. The primary language spoken on the reserve is Western Ojibwa. Though the ancestors of O'Chiese First Nation made the area about the Baptiste River their winter camp site where they hunted moose and deer, and trapped small game for the fur trade, they also migrated in the summer as far south as the Milk River in what is now Montana.

== Governance ==
The O'Chiese First Nation elect their leadership through the Act Electoral System. The First Nation is affiliated with Yellowhead Tribal Council. O'Chiese First Nation is a signatory to Treaty 6 adhesion, signed on May 13, 1950.

== See also ==
- Aboriginal peoples in Alberta
