= Athabasca Tribal Council =

Tribal council in Alberta, Canada

The Athabasca Tribal Council is a tribal council representing five First Nation band governments in the province of Alberta. The organization is based in Fort McMurray, Alberta.

== Demographics ==
As of August 2016, there were 6,807 registered members in the 5 First Nation bands.

== Members ==
- Athabasca Chipewyan First Nation had 1,200 registered members in August 2016.
- Fort McKay First Nation had 851 registered members in August 2016.
- Chipewyan Prairie First Nation had 923 registered members in August 2016.
- Fort McMurray First Nation had 763 registered members in August 2016.
- Mikisew Cree First Nation had 3,070 registered members in August 2016.
