= Sawridge 150G =

Coordinates: 55°17′21″N 114°40′03″W

- Indian reserve
- Sawridge Indian Reserve No. 150G
- Boundaries of Sawridge 150G

- Location in Alberta
- First Nation: Sawridge First Nation
- Treaty: 8
- Country: Canada
- Province: Alberta
- Municipal district: Lesser Slave River
- Headquarters: Slave Lake

Area
  - Total: 9.689 km^{2} (3.741 sq mi)

Population (2016)
  - Total: 20
  - Density: 2.1/km^{2} (5.3/sq mi)
- Time zone: UTC−06:00 (Alberta Time)

Sawridge 150G is an Indian reserve of the Sawridge First Nation in Alberta, located within the Municipal District of Lesser Slave River No. 124. It is adjacent to the eastern boundary of the town of Slave Lake.
