= Kee Tas Kee Now Tribal Council =

Tribal Council representing First Nation communities in north-central Alberta, Canada

Kee Tas Kee Now Tribal Council is a tribal council representing First Nation communities in north-central Alberta, Canada. The council is based in Atikameg, Alberta.

== Member First Nations ==
Current First Nation members are:

- Loon River First Nation
- Lubicon Lake Band
- Peerless Trout First Nation
- Whitefish Lake First Nation
- Woodland Cree First Nation
