= Kapawe'no 229 =

Coordinates: 55°33′14″N 116°08′03″W

- Indian reserve
- Kapawe'no Indian Reserve No. 229
- Location in Alberta
- First Nation: Kapawe'no
- Treaty: 8
- Country: Canada
- Province: Alberta
- Municipal district: Big Lakes

Area
  - Total: 129 ha (320 acres)
- Time zone: UTC−06:00 (Alberta Time)

Kapawe'no 229 is an Indian reserve of the Kapawe'no First Nation in Alberta, located within Big Lakes County. It is 27 kilometres northeast of High Prairie.
