= Kapawe'no 231 =

Coordinates: 55°29′11″N 115°23′30″W

- Indian reserve
- Kapawe'no Indian Reserve No. 231
- Location in Alberta
- First Nation: Kapawe'no
- Treaty: 8
- Country: Canada
- Province: Alberta
- Municipal district: Big Lakes

Area
  - Total: 147 ha (360 acres)
- Time zone: UTC−06:00 (Alberta Time)

Kapawe'no 231 is an Indian reserve of the Kapawe'no First Nation in Alberta, located within Big Lakes County. It is 86 kilometres north of Swan Hills.
