= Loon River First Nation =

First Nations band government in Alberta, Canada

- Band No. 476
- ᒫᑿ ᓰᐲᐩ mâkwa-sîpîy
- People: Cree
- Treaty: Treaty 8
- Headquarters: Red Earth Creek
- Province: Alberta

Land
- Other reserves: Loon Lake 235; Loon Prairie 237; Swampy Lake 236
- Land area: 219.063 km^{2} (84.581 sq mi)

Population (2019)
- On reserve: 523
- On other land: 14
- Off reserve: 131
- Total population: 668

Government
- Chief: Ivan Sawan

Tribal Council
- Kee Tas Kee Now Tribal Council

Website
- loonriver.net

The Loon River First Nation (Cree: ᒫᑿ ᓰᐲᐩ, mâkwa-sîpîy)is a First Nations band government in northern Alberta. A signatory to Treaty 8, it controls three Indian reserves, Loon Lake 235, Loon Prairie 237, and Swampy Lake 236.
