= Western Cree Tribal Council =

Tribal Council representing First Nation communities

Western Cree Tribal Council is a tribal council representing First Nation communities in the Peace River Country of Alberta, Canada.

== Member First Nations ==
Current First Nation members are:

- Duncan's First Nation
- Horse Lake First Nation
