= Kapawe'no 150C =

Coordinates: 55°35′41″N 116°11′15″W

Kapawe'no 150C formerly Halcro 150C
- Indian reserve
- Kapawe'no Indian Reserve No. 150C
- Location in Alberta
- First Nation: Kapawe'no
- Treaty: 8
- Country: Canada
- Province: Alberta
- Municipal district: Big Lakes

Area
  - Total: 21 ha (52 acres)
- Time zone: UTC−06:00 (Alberta Time)

Kapawe'no 150C, formerly known as Halcro 150C, is an Indian reserve of the Kapawe'no First Nation in Alberta, located within Big Lakes County. It is 17 kilometres northeast of High Prairie.
