= Heart Lake (Idaho) =

Lake in Idaho, United States

- Location within Idaho Location within the United States
- Location: Elmore County, Idaho
- Coordinates: 43°56′23″N 114°59′52″W
- Lake type: Glacial
- Primary outflows: Flytrip Creek to Middle Fork Boise River
- Basin countries: United States
- Max. length: 0.20 mi (0.32 km)
- Max. width: 0.15 mi (0.24 km)
- Surface elevation: 8,575 ft (2,614 m)

Heart Lake is a small alpine lake in Elmore County, Idaho, in the Sawtooth Mountains of the Sawtooth National Recreation Area. The lake is accessed from Sawtooth National Forest trail 461.
