= Heart Lake (Lewis and Clark County, Montana) =

Lake in Lewis and Clark County, Montana, United States

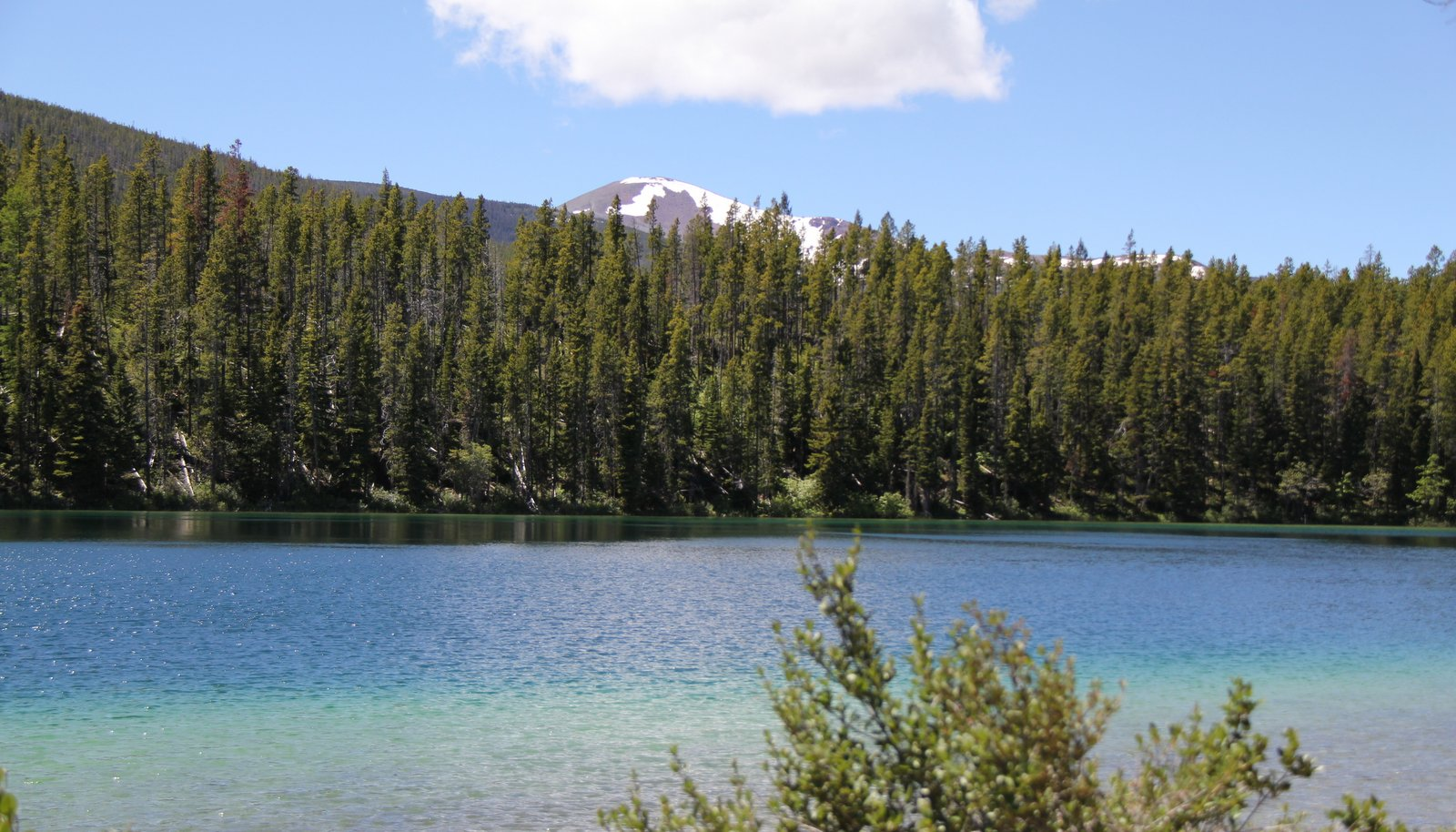

- Location in Montana
- Location: Lewis and Clark County, Montana, United States
- Coordinates: 47°08′16″N 112°39′04″W
- Basin countries: United States
- Max. length: 1,670 feet (510 m)
- Max. width: 1,053 feet (321 m)
- Surface area: 32.2 acres (13.0 ha)
- Surface elevation: 6,434 ft (1,961 m)

Heart Lake is a 32-acre (13 ha) glacial valley lake within the Scapegoat Wilderness of Helena National Forest. Located ten miles (16 km) north of Lincoln, Montana, Heart Lake sits in a cirque five miles west of the Continental Divide. It is home to Arctic grayling and westslope cutthroat trout. The lake is approximately 5 miles (8.0 km) from the Indian Meadows Trailhead. A trail on the east side of the lake goes to Pearl Lake and the top of the divide.
