= Duncan's 151A =

Coordinates: 56°05′49″N 117°51′05″W

- Indian reserve
- Duncan's Indian Reserve No. 151A
- Location in Alberta
- First Nation: Duncan's
- Treaty: 8
- Country: Canada
- Province: Alberta
- Municipal district: Peace

Area
  - Total: 2,036.8 ha (5,033 acres)

Population (2016)
  - Total: 150
  - Density: 7.4/km^{2} (19/sq mi)
- Time zone: UTC−06:00 (Alberta Time)

Duncan's 151A is an Indian reserve of the Duncan's First Nation in Alberta, located within the Municipal District of Peace No. 135. It is 39 kilometres southwest of Peace River. In the 2016 Canadian Census, it recorded a population of 150 living in 52 of its 56 total private dwellings.
