= O'Chiese Cemetery 203A =

Coordinates: 52°12′13″N 115°01′35″W

- Indian reserve
- O'Chiese Cemetery Indian Reserve No. 203A
- Location in Alberta
- First Nation: O'Chiese
- Treaty: 6
- Country: Canada
- Province: Alberta
- Municipal district: Clearwater

Area
  - Total: 0.1 ha (0.25 acres)
- Time zone: UTC−06:00 (Alberta Time)

O'Chiese Cemetery 203A is an Indian reserve of the O'Chiese First Nation in Alberta, located within Clearwater County. It is 13 kilometres southwest of Rocky Mountain House.
