= Utikoomak Lake 155 =

Coordinates: 55°56′04″N 115°33′40″W

- Indian reserve
- Utikoomak Lake Indian Reserve No. 155
- Location in Alberta
- First Nation: Whitefish Lake
- Treaty: 8
- Country: Canada
- Province: Alberta
- Municipal districts: Northern Sunrise; Big Lakes

Area
  - Total: 6,756.1 ha (16,695 acres)

Population (2016)
  - Total: 723
  - Density: 10.7/km^{2} (27.7/sq mi)
- Time zone: UTC−06:00 (Alberta Time)

Utikoomak Lake 155 is an Indian reserve of the Whitefish Lake First Nation in Alberta, located within Northern Sunrise County and Big Lakes County. It is 61 kilometres north of High Prairie. In the 2016 Canadian Census, it recorded a population of 723 living in 158 of its 193 total private dwellings.
