= Woodland Cree 226 =

Coordinates: 56°29′57″N 116°32′21″W

- Indian reserve
- Woodland Cree Indian Reserve No. 226
- Location in Alberta
- First Nation: Woodland Cree
- Treaty: 8
- Country: Canada
- Province: Alberta
- Municipal district: Northern Sunrise

Area
  - Total: 11,660 ha (28,800 acres)

Population (2016)
  - Total: 723
  - Density: 6.20/km^{2} (16.1/sq mi)
- Time zone: UTC−06:00 (Alberta Time)

Woodland Cree 226 is an Indian reserve of the Woodland Cree First Nation in Alberta, located within Northern Sunrise County. It is 48 kilometres northeast of Peace River. In the 2016 Canadian Census, it recorded a population of 723 living in 188 of its 211 total private dwellings.
