= Janvier 194 =

Coordinates: 55°56′00″N 110°43′18″W

- Indian reserve
- Janvier Indian Reserve No. 194
- Location in Alberta
- First Nation: Chipewyan Prairie
- Treaty: 8
- Country: Canada
- Province: Alberta
- Specialized municipality: Wood Buffalo

Area
  - Total: 2,486.7 ha (6,145 acres)

Population (2016)
  - Total: 414
  - Density: 16.6/km^{2} (43.1/sq mi)
- Time zone: UTC−06:00 (Alberta Time)

Janvier 194 is an Indian reserve of the Chipewyan Prairie First Nation in Alberta, Canada that is surrounded by the Regional Municipality of Wood Buffalo. It is 97 km (60 mi) southwest of Fort McMurray.

== History ==
People began migrating to the Janvier area in the 1920s.

== Geography ==
The locality of Janvier is on the Janvier 194 reserve.

== Demographics ==
In the 2016 Canadian Census, it recorded a population of 414 living in 126 of its 143 total private dwellings.
