= Alexis Elk River 233 =

Coordinates: 52°55′27″N 116°33′01″W

- Indian reserve
- Alexis Elk River Indian Reserve No. 233
- Boundaries of Alexis Elk River 233

- Location in Alberta
- First Nation: Alexis Nakota Sioux
- Treaty: 6
- Country: Canada
- Province: Alberta
- Municipal district: Yellowhead

Area
  - Total: 98 ha (240 acres)
- Time zone: UTC−06:00 (Alberta Time)

Alexis Elk River 233 is an Indian reserve of the Alexis Nakota Sioux Nation in Alberta, located within Yellowhead County. It is 87 kilometres southeast of Hinton.
