= Sawridge 150H =

Coordinates: 55°18′21″N 114°52′37″W

- Indian reserve
- Sawridge Indian Reserve No. 150H
- Location in Alberta
- First Nation: Sawridge First Nation
- Treaty: 8
- Country: Canada
- Province: Alberta
- Municipal district: Lesser Slave River
- Headquarters: Slave Lake

Area
  - Total: 12.702 km^{2} (4.904 sq mi)

Population (2016)
  - Total: 10
  - Density: 0.79/km^{2} (2.0/sq mi)
- Time zone: UTC−06:00 (Alberta Time)

Sawridge 150H is an Indian reserve of the Sawridge First Nation in Alberta, located within the Municipal District of Lesser Slave River No. 124. It is west of the town of Slave Lake.

The area around Sawridge 150H is mostly unpopulated, with less than two inhabitants per square kilometer. The warmest month is July, when the with average temperature 16 °C, and the coldest is December with average temperature −14 °C
