= Kapawe'no 230 =

Coordinates: 55°31′51″N 116°06′32″W

- Indian reserve
- Kapawe'no Indian Reserve No. 230
- Location in Alberta
- First Nation: Kapawe'no
- Treaty: 8
- Country: Canada
- Province: Alberta
- Municipal district: Big Lakes

Area
  - Total: 846 ha (2,090 acres)
- Time zone: UTC−06:00 (Alberta Time)

Kapawe'no 230 is an Indian reserve of the Kapawe'no First Nation in Alberta, located within Big Lakes County. It is 25 kilometres northeast of High Prairie.
