= Sunchild First Nation =

First Nation in Alberta, Canada

- Band No. 434
- People: Ojibway and Cree
- Treaty: Treaty 6
- Headquarters: Rocky Mountain House
- Province: Alberta

Land
- Other reserve: Sunchild 202
- Land area: 52.181 km^{2} (20.147 sq mi)

Population (2026)
- On reserve: 1007
- Off reserve: 539
- Total population: 1546

Government
- Chief: Joey Pete

Tribal Council
- Yellowhead Tribal Council

The Sunchild First Nation is a Cree and Ojibway First Nation in Alberta, Canada part of Treaty 6, signed on May 25, 1944, under the leadership of Chief Louis Sunchild. The First Nation has one reserve, Sunchild 202. The reserve, 52.18 km^{2} (20.15 mi^{2}) in size, is located approximately 60 km (37 mi) northwest of Rocky Mountain House. It shares the western border of the O'Chiese First Nation.

As of March 13, 2023, the Sunchild First Nation is led by Chief Joey Pete and councillors Adriel Bigchild, Audrey Cookedlegs, Clint McHugh, James Frencheater, Jessica Goodrunning and Norman Lagrelle. The Chief and Council oversee approximately 1500 members( 1,209 in 2008 census), with approximately 75% living on the Nation. The community is served by the Sunchild First Nation's administrative office, Sunchild First Nation School, Sunchild health centre, Sunchild convenience store, a community head-start program, volunteer fire department, community corrections and a RCMP remote office.

The Sunchild First Nation is home of the Sunchild Bison Cheerleading team, Canada's first and only First Nation Cheerleading program on a reserve.

As of August 2026, the Sunchild First Nation had a population of 1,546 people, of which 1,007 lived on reserve.
