= Drift Pile River 150 =

Coordinates: 55°21′51″N 115°46′16″W

Drift Pile River 150 ᒥᐦᑎᐦᑕᑳᐤ ᓰᐱᐩ mihtihtakâw sîpiy
- Indian reserve
- Drift Pile River Indian Reserve No. 150
- Location in Alberta
- First Nation: Driftpile Cree
- Treaty: 8
- Country: Canada
- Province: Alberta
- Municipal district: Big Lakes

Area
  - Total: 6,354.8 ha (15,703 acres)

Population (2016)
  - Total: 828
  - Density: 13.0/km^{2} (33.7/sq mi)
- Time zone: UTC−06:00 (Alberta Time)

Drift Pile River 150 is an Indian reserve of the Driftpile Cree Nation in Alberta, located within Big Lakes County. It is 6 kilometers southeast of Lesser Slave Lake. In the 2016 Canadian Census, it recorded a population of 828 living in 258 of its 277 total private dwellings.
