= Alexis Nakota Sioux First Nation =

Nakoda First Nation in Alberta, Canada

Alexis Nakota Sioux Nation
- Band No. 133
- Cade Wicashdabi
- People: Nakota
- Province: Alberta

Land
- Main reserve: Alexis Indian Reserve 133
- Reserves: Alexis Whitecourt Indian Reserve 232; Alexis Elk River Indian Reserve 233; Alexis Cardinal River Indian Reserve 234
- Land area: 144.79 km^{2} (55.90 sq mi)

Population (January 2022)
- On reserve: 1,229
- Off reserve: 965
- Total population: 2,194

Government
- Chief: Tony Alexis
- Council size: 7

Tribal Council
- Yellowhead Tribal Development Foundation (fr)

Website
- https://www.ansn.ca/

The Alexis Nakota Sioux Nation (Stoney: Cade Wicashdabi) no. 437 is a Nakoda First Nation with reserves near Edmonton, Hinton, and Whitecourt, in the Canadian province of Alberta, and headquartered at 54° N and 114°, about 85 kilometres (53 mi) west of Edmonton. The Alexis Nakota Sioux Nation is a member of Treaty 6.

== Reserves ==
Alexis Nakota Sioux reserves
Reserve	Location	Area (hectares)
Alexis Indian Reserve 133	70 km NW of Edmonton	6175.2
Alexis Cardinal River Indian Reserve 234	73 km SE of Hinton	4661
Alexis Elk River Indian Reserve 233	87 km SE of Hinton	98
Alexis Whitecourt Indian Reserve 232	13 km NW of Whitecourt	3544.9

== Demographics ==
As of March, 2019, the total registered population of Alexis Nakota Sioux Nation is 2036 persons. There are 508 registered males, and 459 females living on their own reserve.

Members of Alexis First Nation are of the "Stoney" or "Nakoda" ethnic group. The Stoney are sometimes considered part of the Assiniboine. The terms "Stoney" and "Assiniboine" stem from outsider's descriptions of how those peoples cooked by using heated stones (Assiniboine originates from the Ojibwe language; asinii meaning "stoney" and bwaan meaning "cooker"). The term Sioux is also an outsider's description used by the French to describe the Dakota and Lakota Nations in the United States. The Dakota and Lakota in Canada are non-treaty First Nations. Their traditional language is Nakoda/Stoney, and their endonym is I'sga I?abi.

== Government ==
Alexis Nakota Sioux Nation has a custom electoral system based on section 10 of the Indian Act. Current chief and council were elected on June 14, 2022, and will hold their positions until June 17, 2026.

Alexis Nakota Sioux Nation Chief and Council
Title	Name
Chief	Tony Alexis
Councillor	Darwin Alexis
Councillor	Dwayne Alexis
Councillor	Hank Alexis
Councillor	Tina Cardinal
Councillor	Darren Kootenay
Councillor	Lonnie Letendre
Councillor	Emily Potts

== Events ==
=== Pow-wow/Fastpitch tournament ===
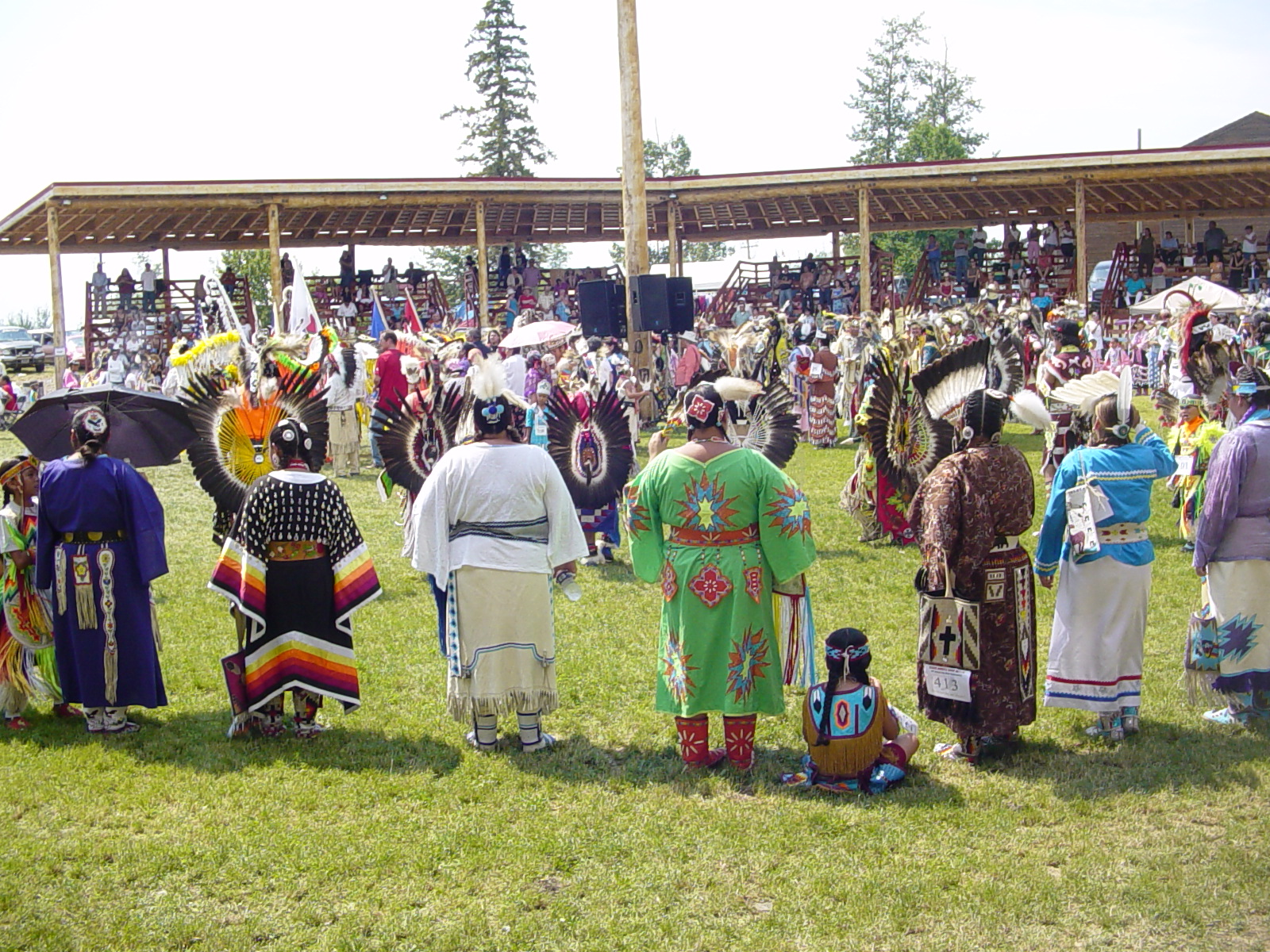
In the arbor during the grand entry, Alexis powwow 2007.

The Alexis Annual Pow-wow Celebrations and Fastpitch Tournament is held on the Alexis reserve each summer in July. The Fastpitch tournament draws prizes of about $14,000 depending on the number of teams entered. The Pow-wow is generally divided into various categories, such as a drum contest and dance contests based on ages and/or styles. Competitors from many different First Nations participate.

=== Lac Ste. Anne Pilgrimage ===
The main townsite is located on the shores of Lac Ste. Anne, which the Nakota Sioux call Wakâmne, or God's lake. Every summer there is a pilgrimage to the lake which is attended by up to 40,000 over four days, most of First Nations and Métis descent.

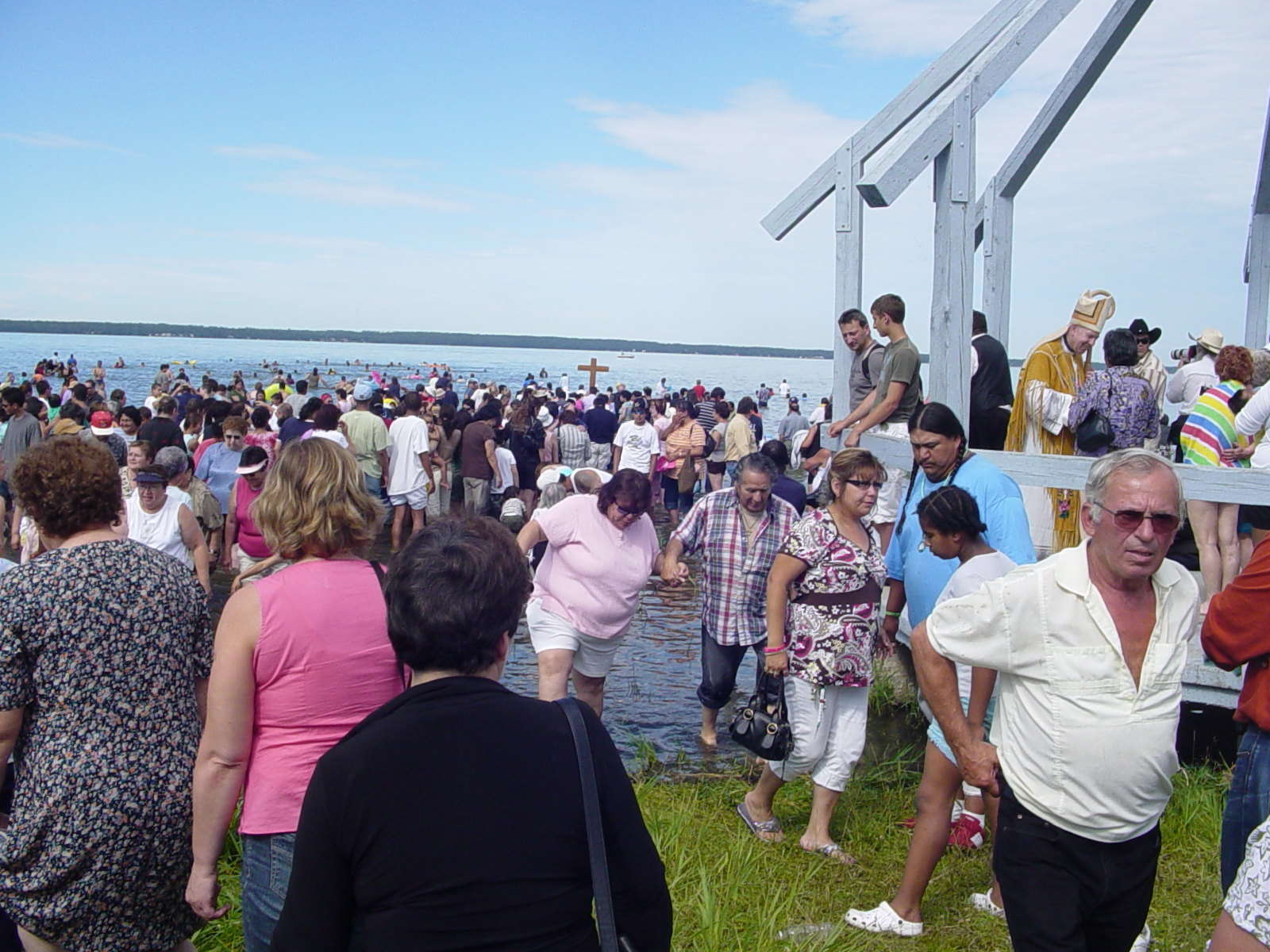
Lac Ste. Anne pilgrims enter the waters during the blessing of the lake.

== See also ==
- List of Indian reserves in Alberta
