= Alexis Whitecourt 232 =

Coordinates: 54°13′29″N 115°49′15″W

- Indian reserve
- Alexis Whitecourt Indian Reserve No. 232
- Boundaries of Alexis Whitecourt 232

- Location in Alberta
- First Nation: Alexis Nakota Sioux
- Treaty: 8
- Country: Canada
- Province: Alberta
- Municipal district: Woodlands

Area
  - Total: 3,544.9 ha (8,760 acres)
- Time zone: UTC−06:00 (Alberta Time)

Alexis Whitecourt 232 is an Indian reserve of the Alexis Nakota Sioux Nation in Alberta, located within Woodlands County. It is 13 kilometres northwest of Whitecourt.
