= Sucker Creek First Nation =

First Nation near Enilda, Alberta

- Band No. 456
- ᓇᒦᐲ ᓰᐲᓯᐢ namîpî sîpîsis
- People: Nehiyaw (Cree)
- Treaty: Treaty 8
- Headquarters: Enilda
- Province: Alberta

Land
- Other reserve: Sucker Creek 150A
- Land area: 59.87 km^{2} (23.12 sq mi)

Population (2025)
- On reserve: 782
- On other land: 36
- Off reserve: 2515
- Total population: 3333

Government
- Chief: Carol Okemow
- Council size: 6

Tribal Council
- Lesser Slave Lake Indian Regional Council

Sucker Creek First Nation (Cree: ᓇᒦᐲ ᓰᐲᓯᐢ, namîpî sîpîsis) is a Cree First Nations band government whose reserve community is located along the southwestern shore of Lesser Slave Lake near Enilda, Alberta. It is a Treaty 8 First Nation. The band had a registered population of 3,333 (as of April 2025) and almost 6,000 hectares of reserve land.

== Notable members ==
- Chief Headman Moostoos
- Jessica Johns
- Harold Cardinal
- Lorne Cardinal
- Darren Brule
- Darlene Cardinal
- Nipawi Mahihkan Misit Kakinoosit
- Linsay Willier
- Ron LaRiviere - lead social worker for the government of Alberta's Child Welfare strategy regarding Bill C 92.
