= Sucker Creek 150A =

Coordinates: 55°26′27″N 116°08′29″W

- Indian reserve
- Sucker Creek Indian Reserve No. 150A
- Location in Alberta
- First Nation: Sucker Creek
- Treaty: 8
- Country: Canada
- Province: Alberta
- Municipal district: Big Lakes

Area
  - Total: 5,987 ha (14,790 acres)

Population (2016)
  - Total: 689
  - Density: 11.5/km^{2} (29.8/sq mi)
- Time zone: UTC−06:00 (Alberta Time)

Sucker Creek 150A is an Indian reserve of the Sucker Creek First Nation in Alberta, located within Big Lakes County. It is 22 kilometres south of High Prairie. In the 2016 Canadian Census, it recorded a population of 689 living in 235 of its 274 total private dwellings.
