= Sawridge First Nation =

First Nation in Alberta, Canada

- Band No. 454
- Treaty: Treaty 8
- Headquarters: Slave Lake
- Province: Alberta

Land
- Other reserves: Sawridge 150G; Sawridge 150H
- Land area: 21.433 km^{2} (8.275 sq mi)

Population (2019)
- On reserve: 42
- Off reserve: 479
- Total population: 521

Government
- Chief: Isaac Twinn

Tribal Council
- Lesser Slave Lake Indian Regional Council

Website
- sawridgefirstnation.com

The Sawridge First Nation is a First Nations band government in northern Alberta. Headquartered in the town of Slave Lake, it controls two Indian reserves, Sawridge 150G and Sawridge 150H.
