= Unipouheos 121 =

Coordinates: 53°52′06″N 110°21′37″W

- Indian reserve
- Unipouheos Indian Reserve No. 121
- Location in Alberta
- First Nation: Frog Lake
- Treaty: 6
- Country: Canada
- Province: Alberta
- Municipal districts: Bonnyville; St. Paul

Area
  - Total: 8,506.3 ha (21,020 acres)

Population (2016)
  - Total: 909
  - Density: 10.7/km^{2} (27.7/sq mi)
- Time zone: UTC−06:00 (Alberta Time)

Unipouheos 121 is an Indian reserve of the Frog Lake First Nation in Alberta, located within the Municipal District of Bonnyville No. 87 and the County of St. Paul No. 19. It is 32 kilometres southeast of Bonnyville. In the 2016 Canadian Census, it recorded a population of 909 living in 205 of its 232 total private dwellings.
