= Kapawe'no 150D =

Coordinates: 55°36′55″N 116°16′07″W

Kapawe'no 150D formerly Pakashan 150D
- Indian reserve
- Kapawe'no Indian Reserve No. 150D
- Location in Alberta
- First Nation: Kapawe'no
- Treaty: 8
- Country: Canada
- Province: Alberta
- Municipal district: Big Lakes

Area
  - Total: 390.1 ha (964 acres)

Population (2016)
  - Total: 5
  - Density: 1.3/km^{2} (3.3/sq mi)
- Time zone: UTC−06:00 (Alberta Time)

Kapawe'no 150D, formerly known as Pakashan 150D, is an Indian reserve of the Kapawe'no First Nation in Alberta, located within Big Lakes County. It is 13 kilometres northwest of Lesser Slave Lake. In the 2016 Canadian Census, it recorded a population of 5 living in 4 of its 7 total private dwellings.
