= Alexis Cardinal River 234 =

Coordinates: 52°50′23″N 117°01′12″W

- Indian reserve
- Alexis Cardinal River Indian Reserve No. 234
- Boundaries of Alexis Cardinal River 234

- Location in Alberta
- First Nation: Alexis Nakota Sioux
- Treaty: 6
- Country: Canada
- Province: Alberta
- Municipal district: Yellowhead

Area
  - Total: 4,661 ha (11,520 acres)
- Time zone: UTC−06:00 (Alberta Time)

Alexis Cardinal River 234 is an Indian reserve of the Alexis Nakota Sioux Nation in Alberta, located within Yellowhead County. It is 73 kilometres southeast of Hinton.
