= Maskwacis Cree Tribal Council =

Maskwacis Cree Tribal Council is a tribal council representing four First Nation communities in central Alberta, Canada. The council is based in Maskwacis, Alberta.

== Member First Nations ==
Current First Nation members are:

- Ermineskin Cree Nation
- Louis Bull Tribe
- Montana First Nation
- Samson Cree Nation
