= Reno, Alberta =

Hamlet in central Alberta, Canada

Reno
- Hamlet
- Location of Reno Reno (Canada)
- Coordinates: 55°59′34″N 116°59′37″W
- Country: Canada
- Province: Alberta
- Region: Northern Alberta
- Census division: 17
- Municipal district: Northern Sunrise County

Government
  - Type: Unincorporated
  - Governing body: Northern Sunrise County Council

Area (2021)
  - Land: 0.28 km^{2} (0.11 sq mi)

Population (2021)
  - Total: 20
  - Density: 72.1/km^{2} (187/sq mi)
- Time zone: UTC−06:00 (Alberta Time)
- Area codes: 780, 587, 825

Reno is a hamlet in northern Alberta, Canada, within Northern Sunrise County. It is located 8 kilometres (5.0 mi) east of Highway 2, approximately 146 kilometres (91 mi) northeast of Grande Prairie. It is probably named after Reno, Nevada.

== Demographics ==
In the 2021 Census of Population conducted by Statistics Canada, Reno had a population of 20 living in 6 of its 7 total private dwellings, a change of 0% from its 2016 population of 20. With a land area of 0.28 km^{2} (0.11 sq mi), it had a population density of 71.4/km^{2} (185.0/sq mi) in 2021.

As a designated place in the 2016 Census of Population conducted by Statistics Canada, Reno had a population of 20 living in 7 of its 7 total private dwellings, a change of 300% from its 2011 population of 5. With a land area of 0.28 km^{2} (0.11 sq mi), it had a population density of 71.4/km^{2} (185.0/sq mi) in 2016.

== See also ==
- List of communities in Alberta
- List of designated places in Alberta
- List of hamlets in Alberta
