= Sunchild 202 =

Coordinates: 52°40′30″N 115°20′24″W

- Indian reserve
- Sunchild Cree Indian Reserve No. 202
- Boundaries of Sunchild Cree 202

- Location in Alberta
- First Nation: Sunchild
- Treaty: 6
- Country: Canada
- Province: Alberta
- Municipal district: Clearwater

Area
  - Total: 5,218.1 ha (12,894 acres)

Population (2016)
  - Total: 749
  - Density: 14.4/km^{2} (37.2/sq mi)
- Time zone: UTC−06:00 (Alberta Time)

Sunchild 202 is an Indian reserve in Alberta. It is located 44 kilometres (27 mi) northwest of Rocky Mountain House. It is at an elevation of 974 metres (3,196 ft). The population in 2006 was 482. The median age of the population 19.6.
