= Heart Lake (Minnesota) =

Lake in the state of Minnesota, United States

- Location within Minnesota Location within the United States
- Location: Clearwater County, Minnesota, United States
- Coordinates: 47.2590°N 95.3051°W
- Basin countries: United States
- Surface area: 206 acres (83 ha)
- Max. depth: 55 ft (17 m)

Heart Lake is located in northwestern Minnesota, several miles west of Lake Itasca, which is believed to be the headwaters of the Mississippi River.

Heart Lake comprises about 206 acres (83 hectares), has a maximum depth of 55 feet (17 m), consists of 3.5 miles of shoreline, and is mostly surrounded by private cabins.
