= Chipewyan 201 =

Coordinates: 58°31′43″N 110°56′23″W

- Indian reserve
- Chipewyan Indian Reserve No. 201
- Location in Alberta
- First Nation: Athabasca Chipewyan
- Treaty: 8
- Country: Canada
- Province: Alberta
- Specialized municipality: Wood Buffalo

Area
  - Total: 20,072.4 ha (49,600 acres)
- Time zone: UTC−06:00 (Alberta Time)

Chipewyan 201 is an Indian reserve of the Athabasca Chipewyan First Nation in Alberta, located within the Regional Municipality of Wood Buffalo on the south shore of Lake Athabasca.
