= Frog Lake First Nation =

First Nations band government in northern Alberta, Canada

- Band No. 465
- ᐊᔨᑭᓵᑲᐦᐃᑲᐣ ayiki-sâkahikan
- People: Cree
- Treaty: Treaty 6
- Headquarters: Frog Lake
- Province: Alberta

Land
- Other reserves: Puskiakiwenin 122; Unipouheos 121; Blue Quills
- Land area: 188.454 km^{2} (72.762 sq mi)

Population (2026)
- On reserve: 2340
- On other land: 4
- Off reserve: 1526
- Total population: 3870

Government
- Chief: Gregory Desjarlais

Tribal Council
- Tribal Chiefs Ventures Inc

Website
- froglake.ca

Frog Lake First Nation (Cree: ᐊᔨᑭᓵᑲᐦᐃᑲᐣ, ayiki-sâkahikan) is a First Nations band government in northern Alberta. A signatory to Treaty 6, it controls two Indian reserves, Puskiakiwenin 122 and Unipouheos 121, as well as sharing ownership of another, Blue Quills. As of August 2026, Frog Lake had a population of 3,870 registered people, of which 2,340 lived on reserve.

== Government ==
Frog Lake First Nation is governed by an elected Chief and Council who oversee a variety of community services, including: Employment and Training, Daycare, Education, Economic Development, Finance, Health, Housing, Human Services, Post-secondary, Public works, and Youth. The nation is also home to several economic ventures, including: Frog Lake Energy Resources Corporation which explores for and develops oil and gas resources, Tribal Chiefs Ventures Inc. which offers employment training, and the Tribal Chiefs Development Inc. business consortium.

== History ==
In September 2019, they became a signatory to the Buffalo Treaty.
