= Horse Lake First Nation =

Canadian First Nation

- Band No. 449
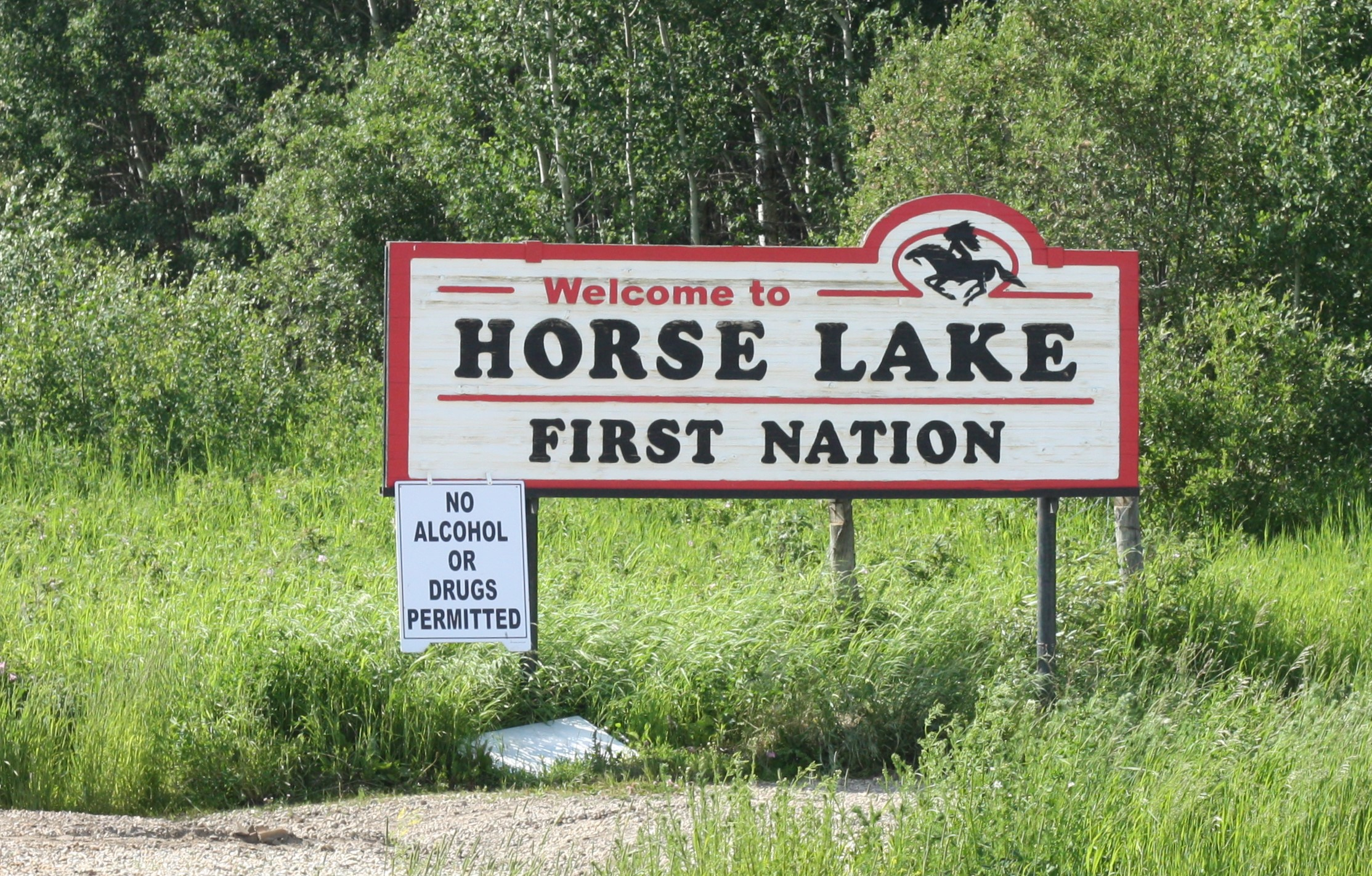
- Welcome sign
- People: Dane-zaa and Cree
- Treaty: Treaty 8
- Headquarters: Horse Lakes
- Province: Alberta

Land
- Main reserve: Horse Lakes 152B
- Reserve: Clear Hills 152C
- Land area: 30.991 km^{2} (11.966 sq mi)

Population (2019)
- On reserve: 507
- Off reserve: 731
- Total population: 1238

Government
- Chief: Dallas Ferguson
- Council: Brian Horseman, Bruce Horseman, Michael Horseman Sr, Chantille Petroski

Tribal Council
- Montney Riverstone Tribal Council

Website
- horselakefn.ca

The Horse Lake First Nation is a First Nations band government west of Hythe in northwestern Alberta, Canada. It consists of the Beaver and Cree people. It is a party to Treaty 8, and is a member of the Montney Riverstone Tribal Council, previously called Western Cree Tribal Council. Despite the former name of the association, Horse Lake First Nation is linguistically and culturally a part of the Danezaa or "Beavers".

As of 2014, the total population of the band was 1,053 people, of whom 466 (44%) lived on reserve or on Crown land and the rest lived off reserve. The band has two reserves, Horse Lakes 152B and Clear Hills 152C with a total land base of 3,099.1 hectares (31 km^{2}).

Since 2002, students who are members of the Horse Lake band have been educated in the Alberta provincial education system, specifically the Peace Wapiti School Division (PWSD), rather than separate reserve schools, with the cost being borne by Indigenous and Northern Affairs Canada. However, in 2012, this arrangement was put in doubt when the budget for non-Aboriginal "at risk" students received was more than doubled by the provincial government from $2.2 million to $5.1 million per year. Under the terms of the contract between Montney Riverstone and PWSD, the band must pay the difference between what the provincial government pays for band members, and what the federal government pays for non-Aboriginals. This implies an additional $3,000 per student.
