= Blue Quills First Nation Indian Reserve =

First Nations reserve in Alberta, Canada

Coordinates: 59°08′14″N 112°25′53″W

Blue Quills
- Indian reserve
- Blue Quills First Nation Indian Reserve
- Location in Alberta
- First Nations: Beaver Lake Cree; Cold Lake; Frog Lake; Heart Lake; Kehewin Cree; Saddle Lake Cree
- Treaty: 6
- Country: Canada
- Province: Alberta
- Municipal district: St. Paul

Area
  - Total: 96.2 ha (238 acres)
- Time zone: UTC−06:00 (Alberta Time)

Blue Quills First Nation is an Indian reserve shared by the Beaver Lake Cree, Cold Lake, Frog Lake, Heart Lake, Kehewin Cree, and Saddle Lake Cree First Nations in Alberta, located within the County of St. Paul No. 19. It is 3 kilometres west of St. Paul.

It is the site of Canada's only Indigenous-owned post-secondary institution, University nuhelotʼįne thaiyotsʼį nistameyimâkanak Blue Quills.
