= Lesser Slave Lake Indian Regional Council =

Tribal council in Canada

Lesser Slave Lake Indian Regional Council is a tribal council representing First Nation communities around Lesser Slave Lake in Alberta, Canada. The council is based in Slave Lake, Alberta.

== Member First Nations ==
Current First Nation members are:

- Driftpile Cree Nation
- Sawridge First Nation
- Sucker Creek First Nation
- Swan River First Nation
