= Chipewyan 201C =

Coordinates: 58°25′32″N 110°54′43″W

- Indian reserve
- Chipewyan Indian Reserve No. 201C
- Location in Alberta
- First Nation: Athabasca Chipewyan
- Treaty: 8
- Country: Canada
- Province: Alberta
- Specialized municipality: Wood Buffalo

Area
  - Total: 18.2 ha (45 acres)
- Time zone: UTC−06:00 (Alberta Time)

Chipewyan 201C is an Indian reserve of the Athabasca Chipewyan First Nation in Alberta, located within the Regional Municipality of Wood Buffalo. It is on the east side of Richardson Lake, about 7 miles south of Lake Athabasca.
