= Kehewin 123 =

Coordinates: 54°06′05″N 110°50′10″W

- Indian reserve
- Kehewin Indian Reserve No. 123
- Location in Alberta
- First Nation: Kehewin Cree
- Treaty: 6
- Country: Canada
- Province: Alberta
- Municipal district: Bonnyville No. 87

Area
  - Total: 8,225 ha (20,320 acres)

Population (2016)
  - Total: 976
  - Density: 11.9/km^{2} (30.7/sq mi)
- Time zone: UTC−06:00 (Alberta Time)

Kehewin 123 is an Indian reserve of the Kehewin Cree Nation in Alberta, located within the Municipal District of Bonnyville No. 87. It is 20 kilometres south of Bonnyville.

== Geography ==
The locality of Kehewin is on the Kehewin 123 reserve.

== Demographics ==
In the 2016 Canadian Census, it recorded a population of 976 living in 233 of its 256 total private dwellings.

== Economy ==
The unemployment rate as of 2022 was approximately 30%. and average incomes among those with full-time work are approximately $12,000 lower than the provincial.

== Education ==
This reserve has a 95.5% high school completion rate, in comparison to the average secondary schooling rate of 88%.
