= Alexander 134A =

Coordinates: 54°17′03″N 116°26′55″W

- Indian reserve
- Alexander Indian Reserve No. 134A
- Boundaries of Alexander 134A

- Location in Alberta
- First Nation: Alexander
- Treaty: 8
- Country: Canada
- Province: Alberta
- Municipal district: Greenview

Area
  - Total: 2,303.5 ha (5,692 acres)
- Time zone: UTC−06:00 (Alberta Time)

Alexander 134A is an Indian reserve of the Alexander First Nation in Alberta. Located within the Municipal District of Greenview No. 16, it is 25 kilometres southeast of Fox Creek.
