= Alexander 134 =

- Indian reserve
- Alexander Indian Reserve No. 134
- Boundaries of Alexander 134

- Location in Alberta
- Coordinates: 53°48′44″N 113°57′32″W
- First Nation: Alexander First Nation
- Treaty: 6
- Country: Canada
- Province: Alberta
- Municipal district: Sturgeon County
- Formed: 1882

Area
  - Total: 68.39 km^{2} (26.41 sq mi)
- Elevation: 695 m (2,280 ft)

Population (2016)
  - Total: 1,099
  - Density: 16.07/km^{2} (41.62/sq mi)
- Time zone: UTC−06:00 (Alberta Time)
- Forward sortation areas: T0G
- Area codes: 780, 587, 825
- Highways: Highway 642
- Waterways: Sandy Lake

Alexander 134 is an Indian reserve of the Alexander First Nation in Alberta, located within Sturgeon County. It is located about 40 km (25 mi) northwest of Edmonton. In the 2016 Canadian Census, it recorded a population of 1,099 living in 272 of its 349 total private dwellings. The reserve has the name of Alexander Arcand, a tribal leader.
