= Heart Lake 167A =

Coordinates: 55°00′27″N 111°42′54″W

- Indian reserve
- Heart Lake Indian Reserve No. 167A
- Location in Alberta
- First Nation: Heart Lake
- Treaty: 8
- Country: Canada
- Province: Alberta
- Specialized municipality: Lac La Biche

Area
  - Total: 8.3 ha (21 acres)
- Time zone: UTC−06:00 (Alberta Time)

Heart Lake 167A is an Indian reserve of the Heart Lake First Nation in Alberta, located within Lac La Biche County.
