= Whitefish Lake First Nation =

- Band No. 459
- ᐊᑎᐦᑲᒣᐠ atihkamek
- Treaty: Treaty 8
- Headquarters: Atikameg
- Province: Alberta

Land
- Main reserve: Utikoomak Lake 155
- Reserves: Utikoomak Lake 155A; Utikoomak Lake 155B
- Land area: 82.997 km^{2} (32.045 sq mi)

Population (2019)
- On reserve: 1299
- On other land: 3
- Off reserve: 1628
- Total population: 2930

Government
- Chief: Albert Thunder
- Council: Cody Laboucan

Tribal Council
- Kee Tas Kee Now Tribal Council

Website
- https://www.whitefish459.com/

The Whitefish Lake First Nation (Cree: ᐊᑎᐦᑲᒣᐠ, atihkamek) is a First Nations band government in northern Alberta. Headquartered in Atikameg, it controls three Indian reserves, Utikoomak Lake 155, Utikoomak Lake 155A, and Utikoomak Lake 155B.
