= Chipewyan 201A =

Coordinates: 58°35′29″N 110°34′12″W

- Indian reserve
- Chipewyan Indian Reserve No. 201A
- Location in Alberta
- First Nation: Athabasca Chipewyan
- Treaty: 8
- Country: Canada
- Province: Alberta
- Specialized municipality: Wood Buffalo

Area
  - Total: 9,515.6 ha (23,514 acres)
- Time zone: UTC−06:00 (Alberta Time)

Chipewyan 201A is an Indian reserve of the Athabasca Chipewyan First Nation in Alberta, located within the Regional Municipality of Wood Buffalo. It is at the southeast end of Lake Athabasca.
