= Athabasca Chipewyan First Nation =

First Nation in Alberta, Canada

- Band No. 463
- K'ai Taile Dené
- People: Dënesųłı̨né
- Treaty: Treaty 8
- Headquarters: Fort Chipewyan
- Province: Alberta

Land
- Main reserve: Chipewyan 201
- Reserves: Chipewyan 201A; Chipewyan 201B; Chipewyan 201C; Chipewyan 201D; Chipewyan 201E; Chipewyan 201F; Chipewyan 201G
- Land area: 347.67 km^{2} (134.24 sq mi)

Population (2019)
- On reserve: 255
- Off reserve: 1048
- Total population: 1303

Government
- Chief: Allan Adam
- Council size: 4

Tribal Council
- Athabasca Tribal Council

Website
- acfn.com

The Athabasca Chipewyan First Nation (ACFN, Chipewyan: K'ai Taile Dené) is a band government. It represents local people of the Denesuline (Chipewyan) ethnic group. It controls eight Indian reserves: Chipewyan 201 and Chipewyan 201A through Chipewyan 201G, near Fort Chipewyan, Alberta. The band is party to Treaty 8, and is a member of the Athabasca Tribal Council.

The ancestors of today's ACFN were evicted from Wood Buffalo National Park by the Government of Canada beginning in 1944, according to research published by the band.

The band launched a court challenge in 2007 to an oilsands lease given to Shell Canada by the provincial government which, the band alleged, they were not given a chance to oppose. In 2011, the band lost its suit, but planned to appeal to the Supreme Court of Canada.

The band was the focus of Neil Young's 2014 concert campaign against the Athabasca oil sands development. In the wake of that the band withdrew from the Oil Sands Monitoring program, which they say lacks input from aboriginal peoples and does not address treaty rights.

Chief Allan Adam was arrested by the Royal Canadian Mounted Police in March 2020, tackling him and punching him severally in the head whilst he lay on the ground.

In September 2024, they became a signatory to the Buffalo Treaty.
