= Lubicon Lake Band =

Cree First Nations band government

- Band No. 453
- People: Cree
- Treaty: Treaty 8
- Headquarters: Little Buffalo
- Province: Alberta

Population (2019)
- On reserve: 107
- On other land: 232
- Off reserve: 376
- Total population: 715

Government
- Chief: Billy Laboucan
- Council: Joe Auger; Brian Laboucan; Jason Laboucan; Troy Laboucan; Timothy Sawan

Tribal Council
- Kee Tas Kee Now Tribal Council

Website
- lubiconlakeband.ca

The Lubicon Lake Band is a Cree First Nations band government in northern Alberta, Canada. Missed by government agents during the signing of Treaty 8 in 1899, the Lubicon community was long without federal support. Seeking to have their traditional title acknowledged through the creation of an Indian reserve, Lubicon representatives have maintained an active land claim since 1933. As oil and gas development changed the face of Alberta, development on Lubicon land became an increasingly pressing issue. Between 1979 and 1982, over 400 oil and gas wells were drilled around the community of Little Buffalo, the band's headquarters. Most prominently, the nation mounted a protest campaign during the 1988 Winter Olympics in Calgary, blockading roads crossing its traditional territory in October of the same year.

Because of a disputed election, the band was placed under third-party management from 2008 to 2013. A secret ballot was used for the first time in 2013, resulting in the election of new Chief Billy Joe Laboucan and the restoration of Government of Canada recognition. In October 2018, Lubicon members approved a settlement with federal and provincial governments in a community vote. The agreement includes $121 million and 246 square kilometres of land near Little Buffalo.

== Land agreement ==
On October 24, 2018, the Lubicon Lake Band reached a land claim agreement with the province of Alberta. Chief Billy Joe Laboucan met with Alberta Premier Rachel Notley and federal Minister of Indigenous Relations Carolyn Bennett for the signing. The agreement includes a land allocation of around 246 square kilometres (95 sq mi) of Crown land in the area of Little Buffalo, northern Alberta, to the Lubicon Lake Band, and $95 million in financial compensation from the federal government. The province of Alberta is providing an additional $18 million, which will go toward the construction of a new post-secondary school for 682 residents who have long struggled with poverty and substandard housing. There will also be developments on infrastructure like housing, roads, and utility services. This needs updating since the United Conservative Party, under the leadership of Jason Kenney, won the last provincial election and has consistently tried to undermine Indigenous land protectors.
