= Chipewyan 201G =

Coordinates: 57°54′21″N 111°23′52″W

- Indian reserve
- Chipewyan Indian Reserve No. 201G
- Location in Alberta
- First Nation: Athabasca Chipewyan
- Treaty: 8
- Country: Canada
- Province: Alberta
- Specialized municipality: Wood Buffalo

Area
  - Total: 905.3 ha (2,237 acres)
- Time zone: UTC−06:00 (Alberta Time)

Chipewyan 201G is an Indian reserve of the Athabasca Chipewyan First Nation in Alberta, located within the Regional Municipality of Wood Buffalo. It is on the east bank of the Athabasca River, 37 miles south of Embarras Portage.
