= Loon Lake, Alberta =

Loon River First Nation Makwa Sipiy
- Reserve / Settlement
- Location of Loon Lake in Alberta
- Coordinates: 56.53745°N 115.39168°W
- Country: Canada
- Province: Alberta
- Census division: No. 17

Government
  - Type: Unincorporated
  - Chief: Bernadette Noskiye
- Elevation: 525 m (1,722 ft)
- Time zone: UTC−06:00 (Alberta Time)
- Website: http://loonriver.net

Loon Lake is a First Nations settlement within the Loon Lake 235 Indian reserve in northern Alberta, Canada. It is located on the eastern shore of the lake, west of Highway 88. It has an elevation of 525 metres (1,722 ft).

The settlement is located in census division No. 17 and in the federal riding of Fort McMurray-Athabasca. The settlement and the Indian reserve are part of the Loon River First Nation.

== See also ==
- List of communities in Alberta
