= Kehewin Cree Nation =

First Nations band government in Alberta, Canada

- Band No. 466
- ᑭᐦᐁᐤ ᓀᐦᐃᔭᐤ ᐊᐢᑭᐩ kihêw nehiyaw askiy
- People: Cree
- Treaty: Treaty 6
- Headquarters: Kehewin
- Province: Alberta

Land
- Main reserve: Kehewin 123
- Reserve: Blue Quills
- Land area: 83.212 km^{2} (32.128 sq mi)

Population (2026)
- On reserve: 1403
- On other land: 27
- Off reserve: 1215
- Total population: 2645

Government
- Chief: Chief Trevor John

Tribal Council
- Tribal Chiefs Ventures

The Kehewin Cree Nation (Cree: ᑭᐦᐁᐤ ᓀᐦᐃᔭᐤ ᐊᐢᑭᐩ, kihêw nehiyaw askiy) is a First Nations band government in northern Alberta. A signatory to Treaty 6, it controls one Indian reserve, Kehewin 123, and shares ownership of another, Blue Quills.

As of August 2026, the band had a population of 2,645 registered people, of which 1,403 lived on reserve.

== Notable people ==
- Chief Kehewin, 1885
