= Heart Lake First Nation =

Canadian First Nation

- Band No. 469
- People: Cree
- Treaty: Treaty 6
- Headquarters: Lac La Biche
- Province: Alberta

Land
- Main reserve: Heart Lake 167
- Reserves: Heart Lake 167A; Blue Quills
- Land area: 46.007 km^{2} (17.763 sq mi)

Population (2026)
- On reserve: 248
- Off reserve: 256
- Total population: 504

Government
- Chief: Curtis Monias
- Council: Craig Cardinal; Sheila Monias

Website
- heartlakefirstnation.com

The Heart Lake First Nation is a First Nations band government in northern Alberta. A signatory to Treaty 6, it controls two Indian reserves, Heart Lake 167 and Heart Lake 167A, as well as sharing ownership of another, Blue Quills.

As of August 2026, Heart Lake had a population of 504 registered people, of which 248 lived on reserve.

== Notable people ==
- Marvin Francis, writer
