= Driftpile First Nation =

First Nation in Alberta

Driftpile Cree Nation
- Band No. 450
- ᒪᐦᑕᐦᑕᑲᐤ ᓯᐱᕀ mihtatakaw sîpîy
- People: Cree
- Treaty: Treaty 8
- Headquarters: Driftpile
- Province: Alberta

Land
- Main reserve: Drift Pile River 150
- Land area: 63.548 km^{2} (24.536 sq mi)

Population (2019)
- On reserve: 963
- On other land: 51
- Off reserve: 1875
- Total population: 2889

Government
- Chief: Dwayne Laboucan
- Council size: 9

Website
- dcn540.com

The Driftpile Cree Nation (or the Driftpile First Nation) (Cree: ᒪᐦᑕᐦᑕᑲᐤ ᓯᐱᕀᐩ, mihtatakaw sîpîy) is a Treaty 8 First Nation with a reserve, Drift Pile River 150, located on the southern shore of the Lesser Slave Lake on Alberta Highway 2 in Northern Alberta. The band has approximately 1200 members.

== History ==
=== Pre-treaty era (Before 1899) ===
- The community was located opposite Lakeshore.
- The Lac St Anne Pilgrimage commenced in 1889.
- The Catholic Church began its influence in the territory.
- Grouard was under consideration as the potential capital city.
- The reserve boundaries were irregular, with rumors suggesting that Chief Kinosayo designed them while intoxicated.

=== 1899–1950 ===
- Chief Kinosayo ratified Treaty 8 in 1899.
  - Originally named Band 150, it was later restructured into Bands 150A, 150B, and 150C.
  - The exact time of Sawridge's separation remains unclear.
- Grandfather George Okimaw educated the Driftpile community on agricultural practices.
- Women played crucial roles, from water and waste management to tanning hides, producing clothing, and childcare.
- Many families had expansive gardens, a practice that continues.
- Traditional hide tanning methods were prevalent.
- To enlist in the military or to gain certain benefits, Indigenous adults were forced to renounce their tribal status.
- Indian agents were deemed deceptive, although no specific incidents are remembered.
- Mandatory attendance began at several Residential Schools in 1921:
  - St. Bruno's in Joussard (1913–1969), segregated with priest training.
  - St. Bernard's in Grouard (1894–1957).
  - St. Martin's/St. Theresa in Desmarais and St. John's in Wabasca (both 1902–1973).
- The Cree language began its decline due to the influence of Residential Schools.
- Families would pay a quarter for transportation (horse and wagon) to bring their children home.
- Around 1905, Grouard was reconsidered as the potential capital of Alberta.
- The community witnessed the construction of paved roads in the 1960s.
- Driftpile was recognized as a nation in 1904, leading to an expansion of the reserve.

=== 1951–2000 ===
- George Cunningham advocated for prioritizing children's needs.
- The Lac St Anne pilgrimage, initiated by Peter, began around 1996.
- Local talents included Stan Isadore, a World Champion Fancy Dancer (circa 1980) and Petey Chalifoux, a Champion Hoop Dancer (2001).
- The community sported teams like the Swingers and Warriors ball teams.
- Infrastructure improvements included a fire hall (1988–1990) and a new school, Mitatikaw Sipiy School, in 1996.
- The area faced several challenges, including floods in 1986 and 1996. Post the 1996 flood, a dike system was installed.
- Environmental concerns arose with the establishment of the Swan Hills Treatment Facility in the 1990s and the Creosote Ties Plant, linked to cancer incidents.
- The iconic Blue Bridge, constructed by the Dominion Bridge Company in 1954, is now a heritage site.
- The community saw advances in living standards, with the entire community gaining access to indoor plumbing by 1997.
- The Driftpile emblem underwent revision in the early 1990s.
- The era witnessed the 1960s scoop and the initiation of the Traditional Pow Wow in 1986 by Rosemary Beaver.

=== 2001–2021 ===
- Kinosayo's artworks were recreated, narrating the story of a medallion's acquisition by the Sawridge band.
- Peter and Clifford Freeman commenced their pilgrimage to Lac St Anne on horseback in 2001.
- The Lakeshore Regional Police has been operational since 2010.
- In 2010, an advisory warned against pregnant women consuming fish from the lake due to mercury contamination.
- The DCN Monument, featuring mosaic art, was built by Wayne Ashley in 2013. Ashley died in 2019.
- Rose Laboucan led as Chief from 2008–2018, remembered for her powerful advocacy and eloquence.
- Medical facilities improved with the Maggie Willier Wellness Centre in 1999.
- Drinking water advisories were issued between 2011 and 2013, leading to a class-action lawsuit.
- The Cows and Plows/Agricultural Benefits were distributed in 2020.
- The community acknowledged successful individuals like Dale Giroux, Billy Ray Belcourt, Rose Laboucan, Pauline Giroux, and Justin Gerard Pahara.
- In 2022, Michael Auger dedicated a monument to the MMIW (Missing and Murdered Indigenous Women) initiative, and the community backed the Red Dress Initiative.
- Driftpile garnered a nomination for a Business Leadership Award in 2019.

=== 2022–2023 ===
- Pope Francis visited Maskwacis in 2022, rendering an official apology with a mass at Commonwealth. DCN elders were in attendance.
- Driftpile received accolades for its Wastewater Treatment Plant.
- Chief Kinosayo Awasak Mikwap was instituted in 2023, marking a milestone for Child and Family Services.
- Notable developments included the construction of a Healing Lodge, the opening of the Travel Centre/Diner 450, and the community's contemplation of repurposing the church.
- Theresa Campio ran another marathon in 2023, adorned in a ribbon skirt, and was also honored with the Queen's Jubilee award.
- Land acquisition continued with a private 1/4 section purchased in 2004, which the community hopes to integrate into the reserve.

=== Future prospects ===
- The DCN has laid out a Strategic Development Plan for 2023–2038.
- A significant event is slated for June 23–25, where unidentified graves from the Joussard IRS will be recognized.

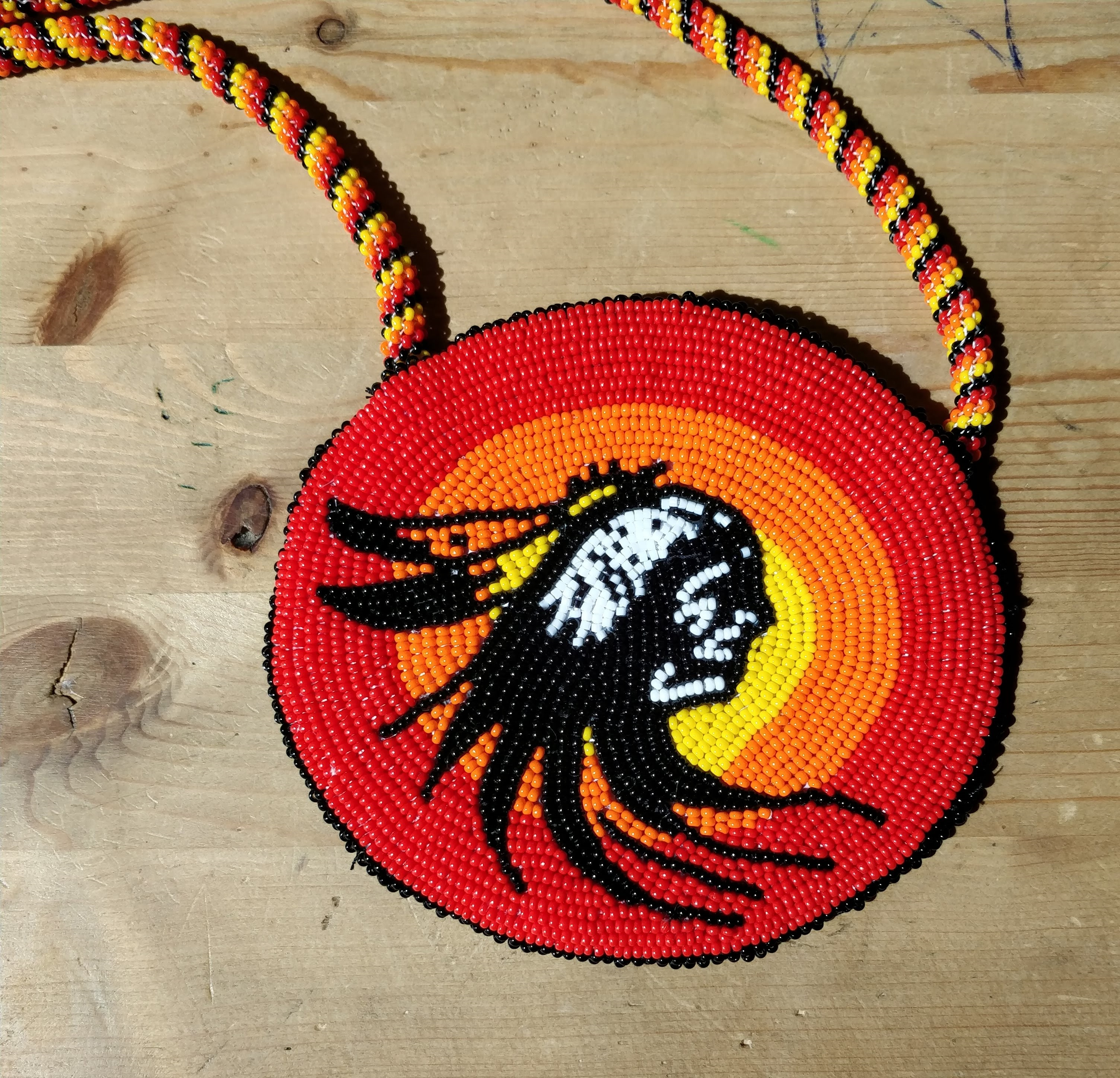
Beaded emblem of the Driftpile Nation
