= Northern Sunrise County =

Municipal district in Alberta, Canada

- Municipal district
- Logo

- Location within Alberta
- Country: Canada
- Province: Alberta
- Region: Northern Alberta
- Census division: 17
- Established: 1994
- Incorporated: 2002

Government
  - Reeve: Carolyn Kolebaba
  - Governing body: Northern Sunrise County Council: Carolyn Kolebaba; Audrey Gall; Dan Boisvert; Norm Duval; Corinna Williams; Gaylene Whitehead
  - Administrative office: east of Peace River

Area (2021)
  - Land: 20,915.18 km^{2} (8,075.40 sq mi)

Population (2021)
  - Total: 1,711
  - Density: 0.1/km^{2} (0.26/sq mi)
- Time zone: UTC−06:00 (Alberta Time)
- Website: northernsunrise.net

Northern Sunrise County is a municipal district in northern Alberta, Canada. Located in Census Division 17, its municipal office is located east of the Town of Peace River at the intersection of Highway 2 and Highway 688.

== History ==
On July 10, 2002, the name changed from Municipal District of East Peace No. 131 to Northern Sunrise County.

== Geography ==
=== Communities and localities ===
The following urban municipalities are surrounded by Northern Sunrise County.

Cities

- none

Towns

- none

Villages

- Nampa

Summer villages

- none

The following hamlets are located within Northern Sunrise County.

Hamlets

- Cadotte Lake
- Little Buffalo
- Marie Reine
- Reno
- St. Isidore

The following localities are located within Northern Sunrise County.

Localities

- Atikamisis Lake Settlement
- Bison Lake
- Cardinal Point
- Harmon Valley
- Judah
- L'Hirondelle
- Lubicon Lake
- Marten River
- Martin River
- Martin River Subdivision
- Simon Lakes
- Springburn
- Three Creeks
- Wabasca Settlement
- Wabiskaw Settlement
- Wesley Creek

== Demographics ==
In the 2021 Census of Population conducted by Statistics Canada, Northern Sunrise County had a population of 1,711 living in 658 of its 765 total private dwellings, a change of −10.9% from its 2016 population of 1,921. With a land area of 20,915.18 km^{2} (8,075.40 sq mi), it had a population density of 0.1/km^{2} (0.2/sq mi) in 2021.

In the 2016 Census of Population conducted by Statistics Canada, Northern Sunrise County had a population of 1,891 living in 712 of its 798 total private dwellings, a 5.6% change from its 2011 population of 1,791. With a land area of 21,150.97 km^{2} (8,166.44 sq mi), it had a population density of 0.1/km^{2} (0.2/sq mi) in 2016.

Northern Sunrise County's 2013 municipal census counted a population of 1,933, a −9.4% change from its 2011 municipal census population of 2,133. A shadow population count also occurred at the same time as its 2013 municipal census, which counted an additional non-permanent population of 592 for a combined 2013 population of 2,525.

== Government ==
Northern Sunrise County has six councilors, one for each of the following wards:

- Ward 1 - Reno / Harmon Valley
- Ward 2 - Nampa
- Ward 3 - Marie Reine / Judah
- Ward 4 - St. Isidore
- Ward 5 - Three Creeks / Wesley Creek
- Ward 6 - Cadotte Lake / Little Buffalo

The reeve is appointed from among the elected councilors.

== See also ==
- List of communities in Alberta
- List of francophone communities in Alberta
- List of municipal districts in Alberta
