= Fort McMurray =

Place in Alberta, Canada

Fort McMurray McMurray (1947–1962)
- Urban service area (hamlet)
- Fort McMurray Urban Service Area
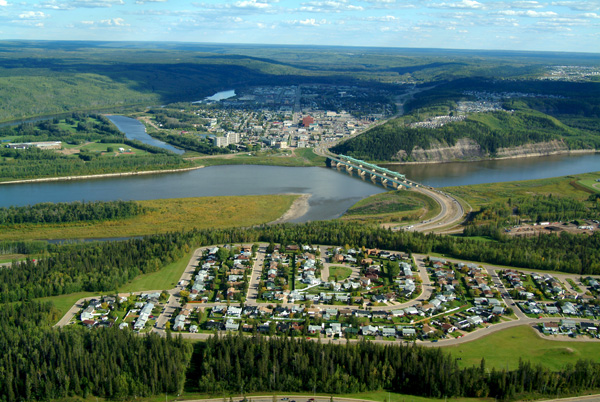
- Aerial view of Fort McMurray with the Athabasca River running through the middle
- Nicknames: "Fort Mac", "Fort McMoney"
- Motto: We Have The Energy
- Location within Alberta Location within Canada Location within Regional Municipality of Wood Buffalo
- Coordinates: 56°43′35″N 111°22′49″W
- Country: Canada
- Province: Alberta
- Region: Northern Alberta
- Census division: 16
- Specialized municipality: RM of Wood Buffalo
- Founded: 1870
- Incorporated
  - Village: May 6, 1947
  - Town: December 29, 1948
  - New town: June 30, 1964
  - City: September 1, 1980
- Name changed: June 1, 1962
- Amalgamated: April 1, 1995

Government
  - Mayor: Sandy Bowman
  - Governing body: Wood Buffalo Municipal Council: Mike Allen; Ty Brandt; Lance Bussieres; Luana Bussieres; Don Scott; Jennifer Vardy; Kendrick Cardinal; Greg "Cowboy" Marcel; Stu Wigle; Kyle Vandecasteyen
  - MP: Laila Goodridge (CPC)
  - MLA: Brian Jean (UCP); Tany Yao (UCP)

Area (2021)
  - Urban: 52.17 km^{2} (20.14 sq mi)
- Elevation: 260 m (850 ft)

Population (2021)
  - Urban: 68,002
  - Urban density: 1,303.5/km^{2} (3,376/sq mi)
  - Municipal census (2021): 72,917
- See Demographics section for population counts from RM of Wood Buffalo's recent municipal censuses.
- Demonym: Fort McMurrayites
- Time zone: UTC−06:00 (Alberta Time)
- Forward sortation areas: T9H – T9K
- Area codes: 780, 587, 825, 368
- Highways: 63, 69
- Waterways: Athabasca River, Clearwater River, Hangingstone River, Horse River
- Website: RM of Wood Buffalo

Fort McMurray (/məkˈmʌri/ mək-MURR-ee) is an urban service area in the Regional Municipality of Wood Buffalo in Alberta, Canada. It is located in northeast Alberta, in the middle of the Athabasca oil sands, surrounded by boreal forest. It has played a significant role in the development of the national petroleum industry. The 2016 Fort McMurray wildfire led to the evacuation of its residents and caused widespread damage.

Formerly a city, Fort McMurray became an urban service area when it amalgamated with Improvement District No. 143 on April 1, 1995, to create the Municipality of Wood Buffalo (renamed the RM of Wood Buffalo on August 14, 1996). Despite its current official designation of urban service area, many locals, politicians and the media still refer to Fort McMurray as a city. Fort McMurray was known simply as McMurray between 1947 and 1962.

== History ==
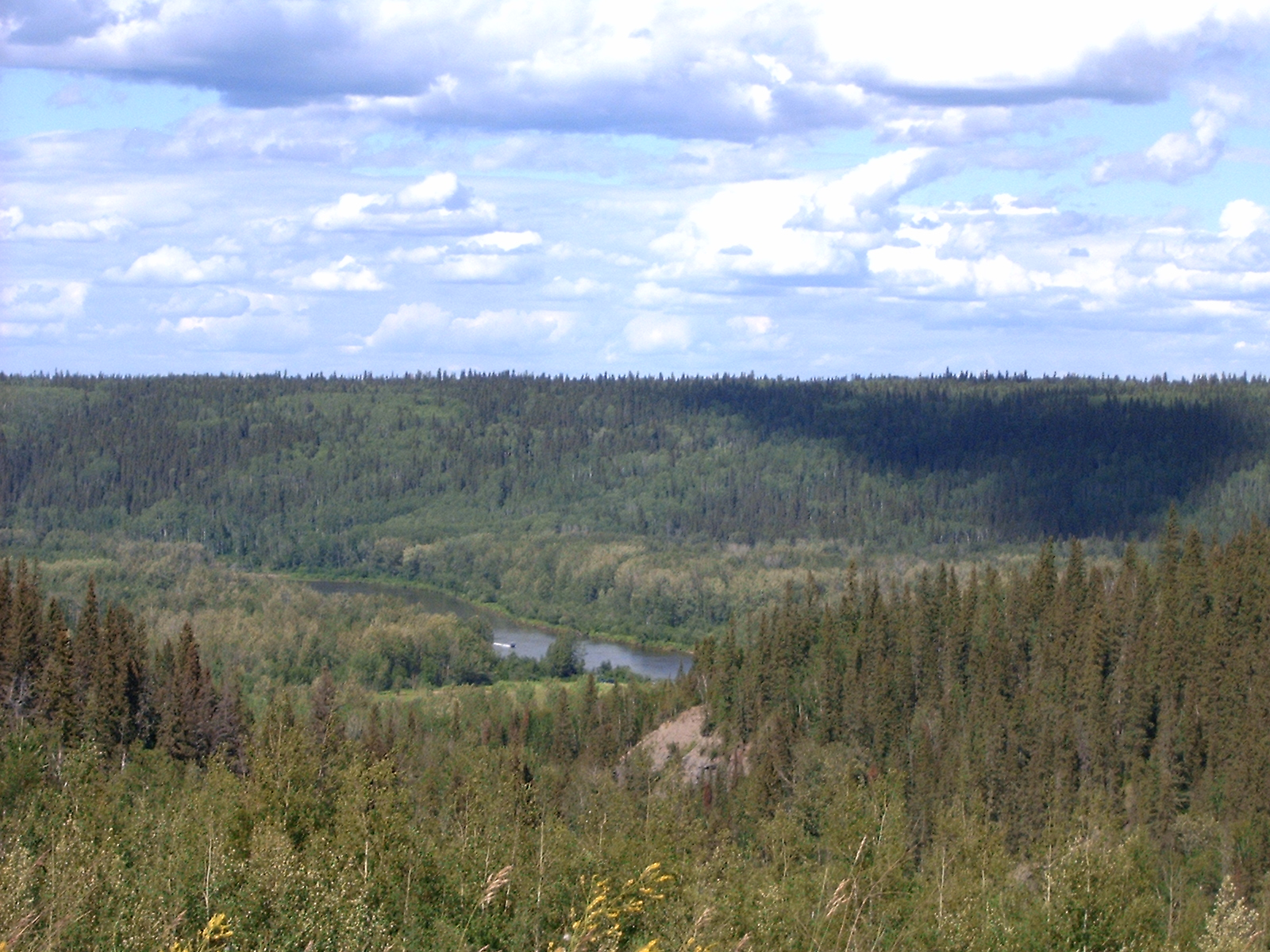
View of the Clearwater River valley from Highway 63

Before the arrival of Europeans in the late 18th century, the Cree were the dominant First Nations people in the Fort McMurray area. The Athabasca oil sands were known to the locals and the surface deposits were used to waterproof their canoes. During the fur trade, the location of Fort McMurray, west of Methye Portage, was an important junction on the fur trade route from eastern Canada to the Athabasca Country.

In 1778, the first European explorer, Peter Pond, came to the region in search of furs, as the European demand for this commodity at the time was strong. Pond explored the region farther south along the Athabasca River and the Clearwater River, but chose to set up a trading post much farther north by the Athabasca River near Lake Athabasca. However, his post closed in 1788 in favour of Fort Chipewyan, now the oldest continuous settlement in Alberta.

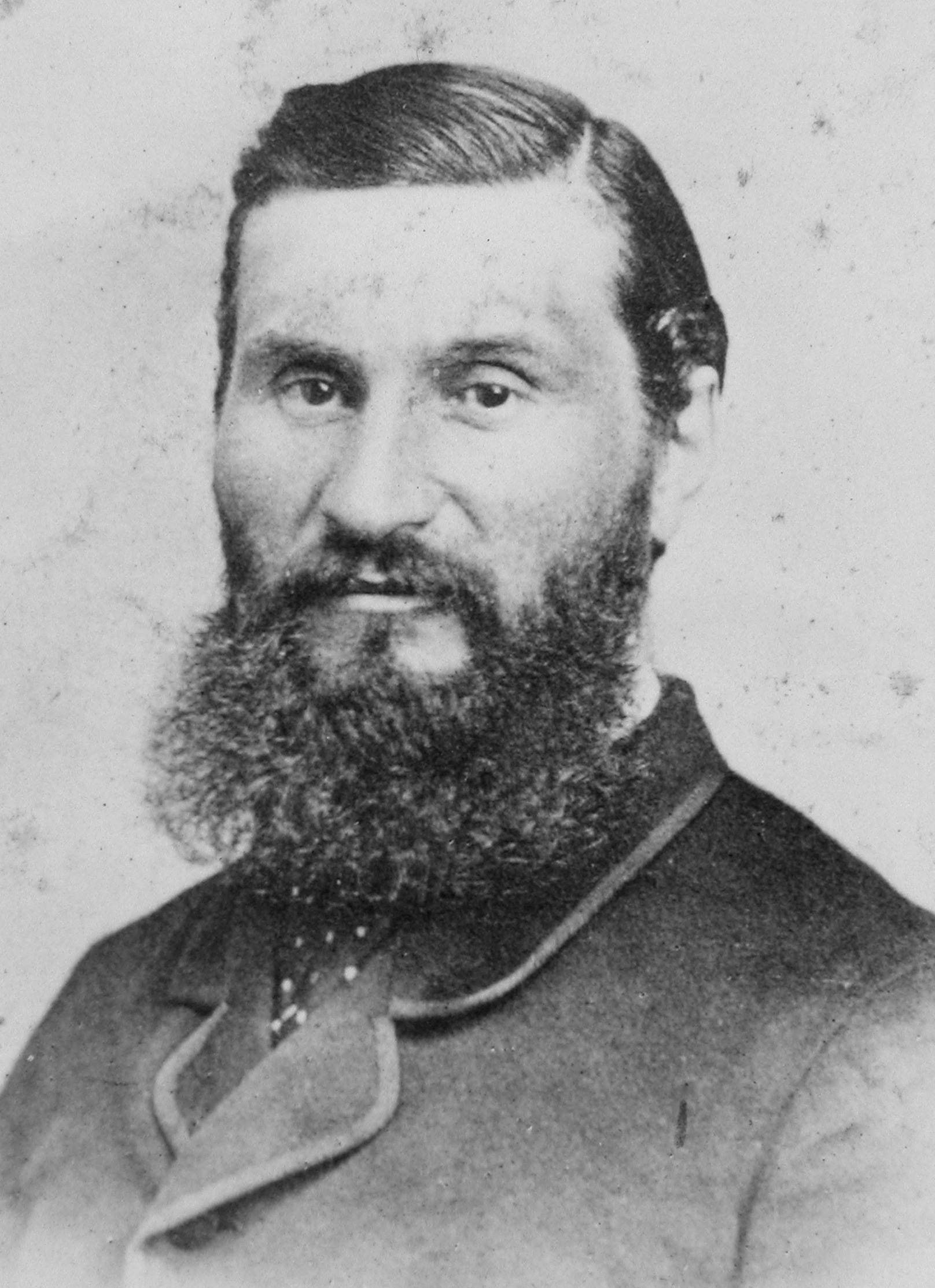
William McMurray for whom Fort McMurray is named

In 1790, the explorer Alexander MacKenzie made the first recorded description of the oil sands. By that time, trading between the explorers and the Cree was already occurring at the confluence of the Clearwater and Athabasca rivers. The Hudson's Bay Company and the North West Company were in fierce competition in this region. Fort McMurray was established there as a Hudson's Bay Company post by 1870, named for the Chief Factor William McMurray. It continued to operate as a transportation stopover in the decades afterwards. The Alberta and Great Waterways Railway arrived in 1915 complementing existing steamboat service.

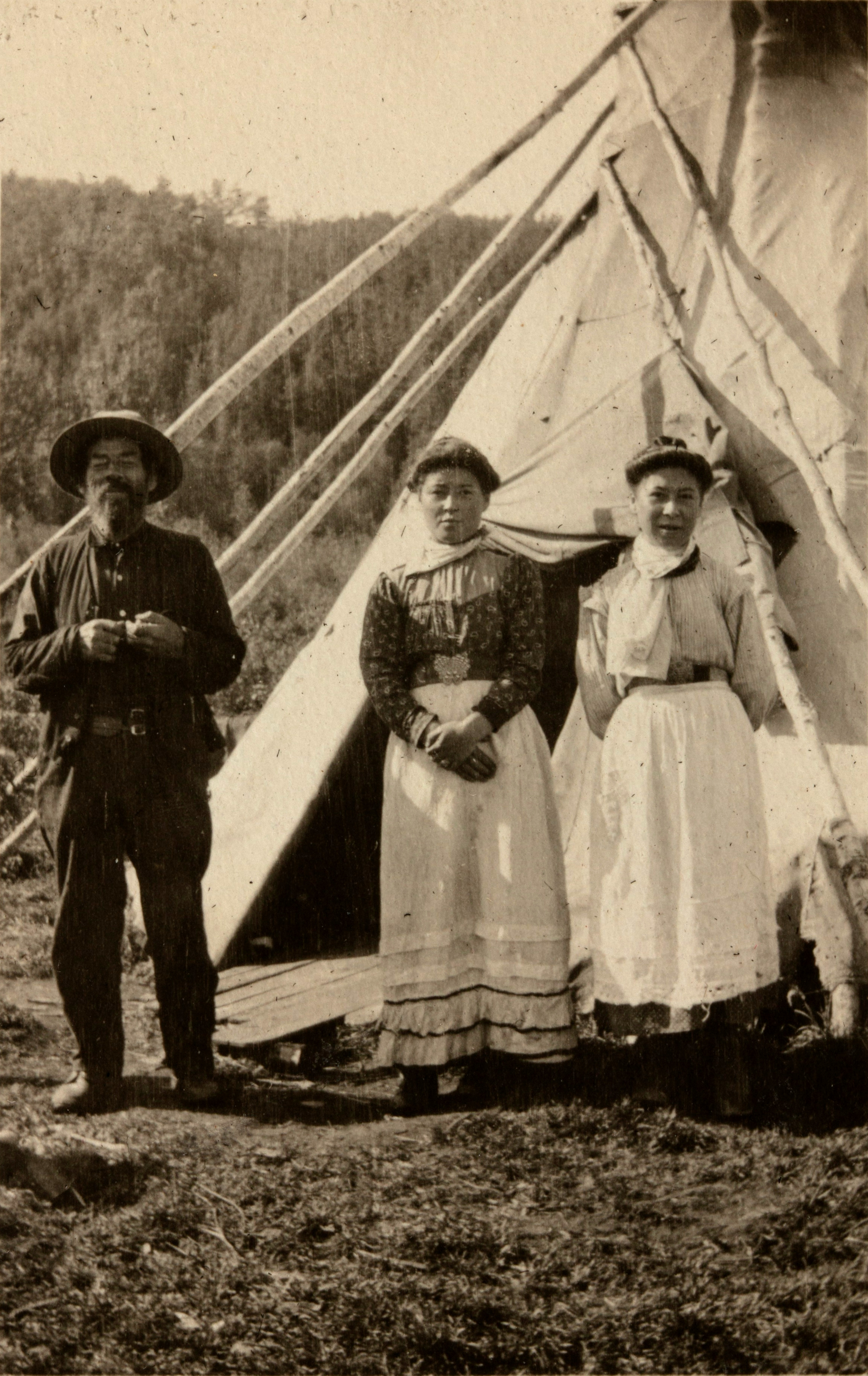
Fur trader Paul Fontaine and his daughters in Fort McMurray, circa 1913-1920.

The community has played a significant role in the history of the petroleum industry in Canada. Oil exploration is known to have occurred in the early 20th century, but Fort McMurray's population remained small, no more than a few hundred people. By 1921, there was serious interest in developing a refining plant to separate the oil from the sands. Alcan Oil Company was the first outfit to begin bulk tests at Fort McMurray. The nearby community of Waterways was established to provide a southern terminus for waterborne transportation when the Alberta and Great Waterways Railway reached there in 1921.

Abasands Oil was the first company to successfully extract oil from the oil sands through hot water extraction by the 1930s, but production was very low. Fort McMurray's processing output gradually grew to over 1,100 barrels/day by World War II, and Fort McMurray was set up by the US and Canadian forces as staging ground for the Canol Project.

Fort McMurray and Waterways amalgamated as the village of McMurray (the "Fort" was dropped until 1962, when it was restored to reflect its heritage) by 1947, and became a town a year later. Fort McMurray was granted the status of new town so it could get more provincial funding. By 1966, the town's population was over 2,000.

In 1967, the Great Canadian Oil Sands (now Suncor) plant opened and Fort McMurray's growth soon took off. More oil sands plants were opened, especially after the 1973 oil crisis and the 1979 energy crisis, when serious political tensions and conflicts in the Middle East triggered oil price spikes. The population of the town reached 6,847 by 1971 and climbed to 31,000 by 1981, a year after its incorporation as a city.

The population peaked at almost 37,000 in 1985, then declined to under 34,000 by 1989. Low oil prices since the oil price collapse in 1986 slowed the oil sands production greatly, as oil extraction from the oil sands is a very expensive process and lower world prices made this uneconomical.

On April 1, 1995, the City of Fort McMurray and Improvement District No. 143 were amalgamated to form the Municipality of Wood Buffalo. The new municipality was subsequently renamed the Regional Municipality (RM) of Wood Buffalo on August 14, 1996. As a result, Fort McMurray was no longer officially designated a city. Instead, it was designated an urban service area within a specialized municipality. The amalgamation resulted in the entire RM of Wood Buffalo being under a single government. Its municipal office is located in Fort McMurray, which accounts for the great majority of the RM's population; all but 5,000 of the RM's residents live in the Fort McMurray urban service area.

The city continued to grow for a few years even after the oil bust caused by the 2003 collapse in world oil prices. Oil price increases since 2003 made oil extraction profitable again for around a decade, until another slump in oil prices which began in December 2014 and deepened in 2015 resulted in layoffs and postponement of projects.

In June 2013, heavy rains caused the Hangingstone River to flood, causing a six-day state of emergency, a bridge collapse, the closure of highways 63 and 881, and the evacuation of 150 people.

=== May 2016 wildfire ===
On May 3, 2016, a large wildfire burning southwest of Fort McMurray resulted in the mandatory evacuation of the community. Record-breaking temperatures, reaching 32.8 °C (91 °F), low relative humidity and strong winds contributed to the fire's rapid growth in forests affected by "an unusually dry and warm winter".

Upwards of 88,000 people in the community and surrounding region were evacuated. It was Canada's largest recorded wildfire evacuation in history and third-largest recorded environmental disaster evacuation behind the 1979 Mississauga train derailment and the 1950 Red River flood.

About one-fifth of homes in the community were reported to be destroyed in the fire.

=== April 2020 flood ===
On April 27, 2020, massive ice jams along the Athabasca River resulted in a major flood. It devastated the downtown of Fort McMurray, submerging streets and ruining businesses, cars and houses.

Approximately 13,000 people from Fort McMurray and the surrounding area were evacuated.

=== May 2024 wildfire ===
On 14 May 2024, a wildfire led to the evacuation of several neighborhoods in the urban service area.

The evacuation displaced upwards of 6,000 people from their homes in these neighborhoods.

== Geography ==
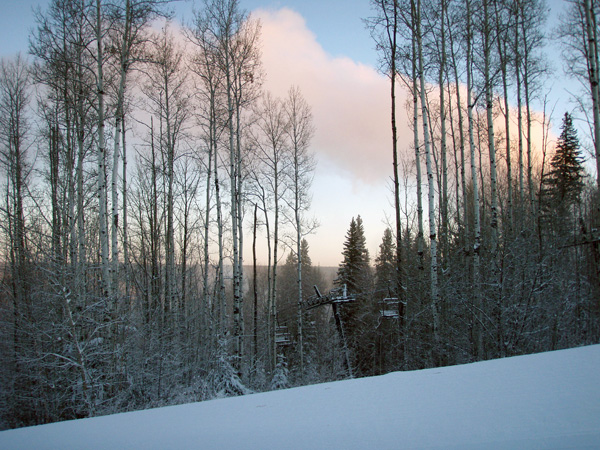
Vista Ridge, a local ski hill

Fort McMurray is 435 km (270 mi) northeast of Edmonton on Highway 63, about 60 km (37 mi) west of the Saskatchewan border, nestled in the boreal forest at the confluence of the Athabasca River, the Clearwater River, the Hangingstone River, and the Horse River. It sits at 370 m (1,210 ft) above sea level. Fort McMurray is the largest community in the Regional Municipality of Wood Buffalo.

White spruce, trembling aspen, balsam poplar and white birch are the most prominent native trees in and around town. Black spruce and tamarack occur in poorly drained areas and jack pine may be seen on the driest sites. European aspen, blue spruce and sand cherry are among the exotic trees occasionally seen.

=== Climate ===
With severe winters except during periods of warming chinook winds, mild to warm summers and only three months whose average temperature is higher than 10.0 °C (50.0 °F), Fort McMurray has a borderline subarctic climate (Köppen: Dfc), being just below the threshold of humid continental climate (Dfb), with May and September average temperature of 9.9 °C (49.8 °F). It falls into the Natural Resources Canada (NRC) Plant Hardiness Zone 3a.

The community lies at a lower elevation than most other parts of Alberta, so under the right conditions it can be a "hot spot" for Alberta.

Temperatures range from an average of −17.2 °C (1.0 °F) in January, to 17.3 °C (63.1 °F) in July. The average annual precipitation is 404.6 mm (15.93 in) and falls mainly in the summer months. Average annual snowfall is 110.6 cm (43.5 in), with almost all of it falling between October and April.

The highest temperature ever recorded in Fort McMurray was 40.3 °C (104.5 °F) on June 30, 2021. The lowest temperature ever recorded was −53.3 °C (−63.9 °F) on February 1, 1917 and December 31, 1933.

Climate data for Fort McMurray (Fort McMurray International Airport) Climate ID: 3062693; coordinates 56°39′N 111°13′W; elevation: 369.1 m (1,211 ft); 1991−2020 normals, extremes 1908−present (Note: Based on station coordinates provided by Environment Canada, climate data was recorded in the lower town site area of Fort McMurray from June 1908 to November 1944 and at Fort McMurray Airport from January 1944 to the present day.)
Month	Jan	Feb	Mar	Apr	May	Jun	Jul	Aug	Sep	Oct	Nov	Dec	Year
Record high humidex	14.6	13.4	19.8	30.4	35.6	38.3	45.6	40.5	33.7	28.4	15.5	10.4	45.6
Record high °C (°F)	15.1 (59.2)	16.1 (61.0)	20.1 (68.2)	35.0 (95.0)	36.7 (98.1)	40.3 (104.5)	38.9 (102.0)	37.0 (98.6)	32.4 (90.3)	29.4 (84.9)	18.9 (66.0)	10.7 (51.3)	40.3 (104.5)
Mean maximum °C (°F)	5.5 (41.9)	7.4 (45.3)	13.0 (55.4)	20.9 (69.6)	28.1 (82.6)	30.0 (86.0)	31.5 (88.7)	31.2 (88.2)	26.5 (79.7)	19.4 (66.9)	8.5 (47.3)	3.9 (39.0)	33.3 (91.9)
Mean daily maximum °C (°F)	−11.9 (10.6)	−7.3 (18.9)	0.1 (32.2)	9.3 (48.7)	17.2 (63.0)	21.7 (71.1)	23.9 (75.0)	22.2 (72.0)	16.2 (61.2)	7.3 (45.1)	−3.2 (26.2)	−9.9 (14.2)	7.1 (44.8)
Daily mean °C (°F)	−17.2 (1.0)	−13.6 (7.5)	−6.7 (19.9)	2.7 (36.9)	9.9 (49.8)	14.9 (58.8)	17.3 (63.1)	15.6 (60.1)	9.9 (49.8)	2.4 (36.3)	−7.6 (18.3)	−14.8 (5.4)	1.1 (34.0)
Mean daily minimum °C (°F)	−22.3 (−8.1)	−19.9 (−3.8)	−13.5 (7.7)	−3.9 (25.0)	2.6 (36.7)	8.0 (46.4)	10.6 (51.1)	8.8 (47.8)	3.5 (38.3)	−2.5 (27.5)	−11.9 (10.6)	−19.6 (−3.3)	−5.0 (23.0)
Mean minimum °C (°F)	−37.4 (−35.3)	−34.1 (−29.4)	−31.4 (−24.5)	−15.2 (4.6)	−5.6 (21.9)	0.9 (33.6)	4.6 (40.3)	1.8 (35.2)	−4.7 (23.5)	−12.4 (9.7)	−25.1 (−13.2)	−34.2 (−29.6)	−39.5 (−39.1)
Record low °C (°F)	−51.7 (−61.1)	−53.3 (−63.9)	−44.4 (−47.9)	−34.4 (−29.9)	−17.3 (0.9)	−6.1 (21.0)	−3.3 (26.1)	−6.1 (21.0)	−15.6 (3.9)	−24.5 (−12.1)	−41.7 (−43.1)	−53.3 (−63.9)	−53.3 (−63.9)
Record low wind chill	−58.4	−59.6	−56.8	−45.8	−21.0	−7.2	0.0	−6.1	−16.0	−31.7	−50.1	−53.2	−59.6
Average precipitation mm (inches)	15.7 (0.62)	13.0 (0.51)	15.3 (0.60)	18.1 (0.71)	31.0 (1.22)	78.0 (3.07)	77.4 (3.05)	55.9 (2.20)	43.7 (1.72)	25.8 (1.02)	17.2 (0.68)	13.4 (0.53)	404.6 (15.93)
Average rainfall mm (inches)	0.2 (0.01)	0.3 (0.01)	2.3 (0.09)	12.1 (0.48)	30.8 (1.21)	77.9 (3.07)	80.0 (3.15)	56.7 (2.23)	43.1 (1.70)	11.4 (0.45)	1.8 (0.07)	0.2 (0.01)	316.7 (12.47)
Average snowfall cm (inches)	20.3 (8.0)	18.9 (7.4)	17.1 (6.7)	7.2 (2.8)	2.5 (1.0)	0.0 (0.0)	0.0 (0.0)	0.0 (0.0)	1.4 (0.6)	8.3 (3.3)	18.3 (7.2)	16.6 (6.5)	110.6 (43.5)
Average precipitation days (≥ 0.2 mm)	13.3	11.3	10.7	9.5	11.2	16.0	17.1	13.6	13.2	11.0	12.5	12.0	151.4
Average rainy days (≥ 0.2 mm)	0.4	0.3	1.7	6.3	10.7	14.5	16.7	13.8	13.6	6.0	1.7	0.7	86.1
Average snowy days (≥ 0.2 cm)	12.5	10.9	9.7	3.7	1.2	0.0	0.0	0.0	0.6	5.6	11.2	11.5	66.7
Average relative humidity (%) (at 1500 LST)	69.9	60.9	49.0	40.5	37.3	46.0	49.8	49.6	51.8	58.9	71.6	74.3	55.0
Average dew point °C (°F)	−19.7 (−3.5)	−17.1 (1.2)	−12.4 (9.7)	−5.7 (21.7)	0.4 (32.7)	7.4 (45.3)	10.9 (51.6)	9.8 (49.6)	4.7 (40.5)	−1.9 (28.6)	−10.1 (13.8)	−17.2 (1.0)	−4.2 (24.4)
Mean monthly sunshine hours	77.7	113.8	176.0	217.3	276.5	264.5	285.5	265.8	165.2	118.4	63.2	65.2	2,088.9
Percentage possible sunshine	33.2	42.5	48.1	50.9	54.4	49.9	53.9	56.5	42.9	36.6	25.6	30.3	43.7
Source 1: Environment and Climate Change Canada (sun 1981–2010)
Source 2: weatherstats.ca (for dewpoint and monthly/yearly average absolute maximum/minimum temperature)

=== Neighbourhoods ===
Neighbourhoods in Fort McMurray include Abasand Heights, Beacon Hill, Dickinsfield, Eagle Ridge, Grayling Terrace, Gregoire, Lower Townsite, Parsons Creek, Prairie Creek, Saline Creek, Stone Creek, Thickwood Heights, Timberlea, Waterways and Wood Buffalo Estates.

== Demographics ==
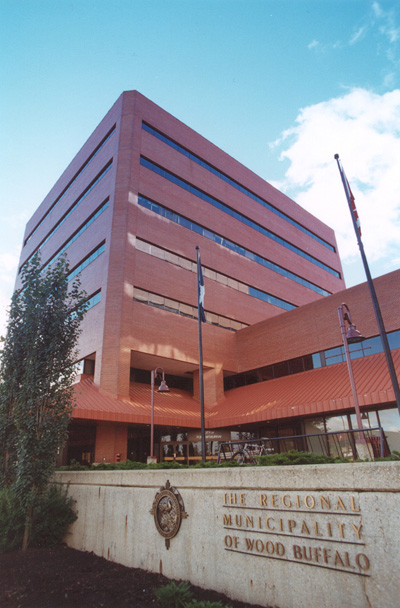
Jubilee Centre (municipal office)

Federal census population history
Year	Pop.	±%
1951	926	—
1956	1,110	+19.9%
1961	1,186	+6.8%
1966	2,614	+120.4%
1971	6,847	+161.9%
1976	15,424	+125.3%
1981	31,000	+101.0%
1986	34,949	+12.7%
1991	34,706	−0.7%
1996	33,078	−4.7%
2001	38,667	+16.9%
2006	47,705	+23.4%
2011	61,374	+28.7%
2016	66,573	+8.5%
2021	68,002	+2.1%
Source: Statistics Canada

=== Federal census ===
In the 2021 census, the Fort McMurray population centre recorded 68,002 residents living in 24,505 of its 28,670 total private dwellings, a change of 1.3% from its 2016 population of 67,123. With a land area of 52.17 km^{2} (20.14 sq mi), it had a population density of 1,303.5/km^{2} (3,376.0/sq mi) in 2021.

In the 2016 census, the Fort McMurray population centre recorded 66,573 residents living in 23,937 of its 28,567 total private dwellings, a 9.9% change from its 2011 population of 60,555. With a land area of 51.79 km^{2} (20.00 sq mi), it had a population density of 1,285.4/km^{2} (3,329.3/sq mi) in 2016.

=== Municipal census ===
Municipal census population, Fort McMurray urban service area
Year	Permanent population	Shadow/non-permanent population	Combined population
2015	78,382	4,342	82,724
2018	72,056	3,559	75,615
2021	72,917	3,089	76,006
2025	82,393	1,074	83,467

Source: RM of Wood Buffalo municipal censuses.

Between 2021 and 2025, the urban permanent population grew by 7,207 residents (9.59%), the largest increase in recent census cycles. Growth was concentrated in specific neighbourhoods: Downtown grew 20.43% to 12,811 residents, Abasand grew 23.44% to 4,656, and Thickwood grew 9.21% to 16,405, while Waterways saw a small decline of 2.56%.

The 2025 census also found the region's average age to be 33.9, significantly younger than the national Canadian average of 41.6, with children aged 0–14 making up 22% of the population, well above the national average of 15.2%.

=== Migration ===
Fort McMurray is an increasingly multicultural community. The 2021 census published by the Regional Municipality of Wood Buffalo found roughly 6,700 people moved to the region since the 2018 census.

The top four provinces that sent people were other communities in Alberta (55 per cent), followed by Newfoundland and Labrador (13 percent), and British Columbia and Ontario (nine percent each).

This is a drastic change from the 2012 municipal census, which was taken when Fort McMurray and the oil sands was undergoing a huge period of economic and population growth. That census reported people from Ontario represented 27.5 percent of Canadians coming to Fort McMurray, followed by British Columbia (26.3 percent) and Newfoundland and Labrador (17.5 percent). People from elsewhere in Alberta made up 3.1 per cent of the population.

The RM of Wood Buffalo's 2025 municipal census found a similar pattern to 2021, with just over half of newcomers (51.47%) relocating from elsewhere within Alberta, commonly from Edmonton and Calgary. Ontario (13.36%), Newfoundland and Labrador (10.27%), and British Columbia (9.63%) remained the most common origins outside the province. The most commonly cited reason for relocating to the region was to reunite with family members (37.76%), followed by finding suitable or improved housing (27.63%) and starting new employment (18.73%).

=== Ethnicity ===
The 2021 census found 61.5 percent of residents are white, compared to 64 percent in 2016. The second largest pan ethnic group is Indigenous (10 percent), South East Asian (9.2 percent), followed by South Asian (7 percent). People identifying as Chinese, Japanese or Korean represented 1.3 percent of the population.

Indigenous peoples represented 7 percent, remaining consistent from 2018. The municipal survey did not count the population of the region's First Nation reserves because they do not fall under municipal jurisdiction. First Nations people represent four percent of the municipality's population. Métis people represent 2.89 percent of the population, followed by Inuk (0.16 percent) and non-Status First Nation (0.13 percent).

About 3.2 percent of people identified as African, followed by mixed ethnicities (2.44 percent), Black or African Canadian (2 percent), European (1.73 percent), Arab (1.41 percent), Hispanic or Latin American (1.08 percent), Caribbean (0.67 percent) and Oceanic (0.13 percent).

2.88 percent of respondents did not answer and 0.52 said they did not know their ethnicity.

Panethnic groups in Fort McMurray (2016–2021)
Panethnic group	2021		2016	
Panethnic group	Pop.	%	Pop.	%
European (Note: Statistic includes all persons that did not make up part of a visible minority or an indigenous identity.)	41,705	61.53%	42,495	64.01%
Indigenous	6,755	9.97%	5,195	7.83%
Southeast Asian (Note: Statistic includes total responses of "Filipino" and "Southeast Asian" under visible minority section on census.)	6,240	9.21%	5,295	7.98%
South Asian	4,755	7.02%	4,785	7.21%
African	4,685	6.91%	4,110	6.19%
Middle Eastern (Note: Statistic includes total responses of "West Asian" and "Arab" under visible minority section on census.)	1,500	2.21%	1,935	2.91%
East Asian (Note: Statistic includes total responses of "Chinese", "Korean", and "Japanese" under visible minority section on census.)	850	1.25%	1,250	1.88%
Latin American	635	0.94%	925	1.39%
Other/multiracial (Note: Statistic includes total responses of "Visible minority, n.i.e." and "Multiple visible minorities" under visible minority section on census.)	650	0.96%	405	0.61%
Total responses	67,780	99.67%	66,385	98.9%
Total population	68,002	100%	67,123	100%
Note: Totals greater than 100% due to multiple origin responses

The RM of Wood Buffalo's 2025 municipal census recorded a continued decline in the White or Caucasian share of the population, to just under 60 percent (59.55%). Southeast Asian residents remained the second-largest group at 10.48%, while Black and Caribbean residents grew to 8.73% of the population, a notable increase from previous censuses. South Asian and Indo-Caribbean residents represented 7.60%, consistent with past trends, while Indigenous peoples—including First Nations, Métis, and Inuit—remained at just over 6% of the population, unchanged from 2021.

== Economy ==
Fort McMurray is the commercial and administrative centre of one of Canada's largest hubs of petroleum production, located within the Athabasca oil sands. Beyond the oil sands themselves, the regional economy also draws on natural gas, pipeline transport, forestry, and tourism. Major oil sands producers operating in the region include Suncor Energy, Canadian Natural Resources, Imperial Oil, and CNOOC International, the Canadian oil sands arm of China National Offshore Oil Corporation. Suncor became the majority owner and operator of the Syncrude joint venture in 2021, though Syncrude continues to operate as a partnership that also includes Imperial Oil, Sinopec, and CNOOC.

Fort McMurray's growth has historically followed the pattern of a boomtown, with housing prices closely tracking the price of oil. The region recorded some of the highest housing prices in Alberta during the boom years of the mid-2000s and mid-2010s, with the average detached home reaching roughly $765,000 in 2014. Prices fell sharply following the 2014–2016 oil price collapse and the 2016 Horse River 2016 Fort McMurray wildfire, as of 2025, the average home price in Fort McMurray was $513,754, though the market has shown signs of recovery, with active listings dropping 31.5% between 2024 and 2025 and average time on market falling from 76 to 59 days.

The Regional Municipality of Wood Buffalo continues to report one of the highest average household incomes in Canada.

== Infrastructure ==
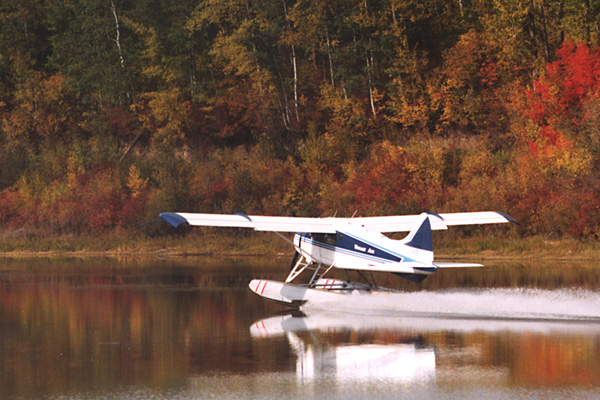
Float plane taking off at the Snye

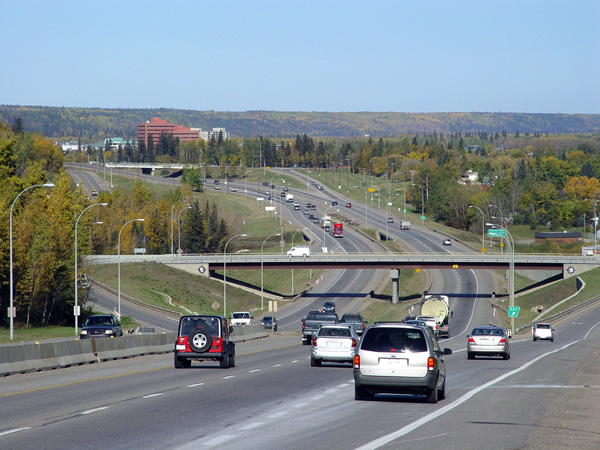
Looking north on Highway 63

=== Air ===
There are several airports in the area, with Fort McMurray International Airport being the largest in northern Alberta. It is serviced by Air Canada, Air Canada Express, McMurray Aviation, Northwestern Air, WestJet and WestJet Encore, with scheduled flights to Calgary, Edmonton, Fort Chipewyan, Fort Smith, Vancouver and Toronto. The airport is also serviced by various oil companies with corporate and charter flights heading north to private airstrips at oil sands operations. Flights are frequently booked to capacity because of the high transient worker population and workers who commute to Fort McMurray from other parts of Canada.

=== Public transit ===
Fort McMurray Transit operates in the community, with routes that extend to all subdivisions on the south side and subdivisions on the north side. Although the service concentrates on Fort McMurray it does operate to hamlets in the RM including Anzac, Janvier, Conklin and Fort McKay.

==== Bus ====
Ebus and Red Arrow operate scheduled passenger bus services to Edmonton and other communities along Highway 63, as well as other destinations farther south.

=== Highways and roads ===
Highway 63 is the only highway between Fort McMurray and Edmonton. Due to the industrial demands of the oilsands, Highway 63 boasts some of the highest tonnage per kilometre in Canada, and the largest and heaviest loads that trucks have ever carried. Highway 63 had large portions twinned in May 2016. Highway 881 also provides access to the region from Lac La Biche.

=== Rail ===
Canadian National Railway (CN) discontinued the Muskeg Mixed (mixed train) to Fort McMurray in 1989, and there has been no passenger rail service since. CN continues to operate freight service on its Lac La Biche subdivision and stations beyond.

=== Mail ===
Canada Post identified Fort McMurray as "having a particularly high cost to serve" in January 2014, and planned to institute a surcharge of $5.00 for all parcels shipped to the area. However, the postal service retracted this decision before the rate change went into effect.

== Education ==
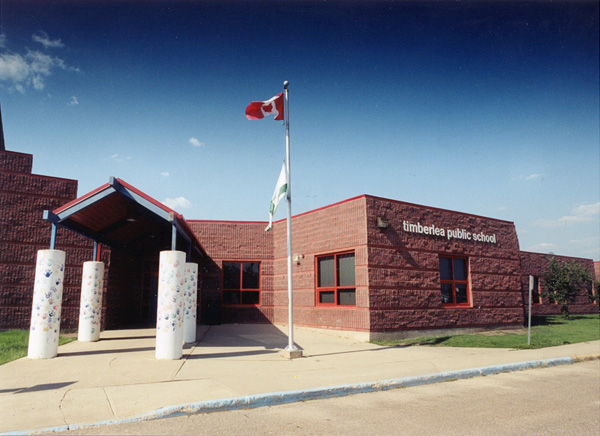
Timberlea Public School (elementary)

The Fort McMurray Public School District (FMPSD) and Catholic School District both serve the primary, elementary, and secondary education needs of students in Fort McMurray. Each school district offers diverse programs like French immersion, performing arts or a dedicated technology and science lab, however only FMPSD offers the Advanced Placement program at one of their schools, being Westwood Community High School.

On Abasand Drive, École Boréal is the only francophone school in the area and goes from pre-kindergarten to grade 12.

Keyano College is a publicly funded college and vocational institute based in the area and plays a role in training workers for the oil sands. Known as the cultural hub of the Regional Municipality of Wood Buffalo, Keyano College contains both a state-of-the-art theatre and recital hall, hosting a variety of musical and theatrical events that attract upwards of 50,000 visitors each season.

== Retail development ==
Fort McMurray's retail sector has long been anchored by Peter Pond Mall, a two-level shopping centre in downtown Fort McMurray that opened in 1978. The mall, with roughly 207,000 square feet of gross leasing area and more than 70 stores and services, is owned by Primaris REIT, which acquired it in 2013 for $168.5 million. The mall is named after Peter Pond, an American fur trader credited with founding Fort Chipewyan and leading the first group of Europeans to see the Athabasca oil sands. As of 2024, Primaris reported sales productivity of $832 per square foot, an increase of 32% since 2019, attributing the growth in part to the region's high average household income.

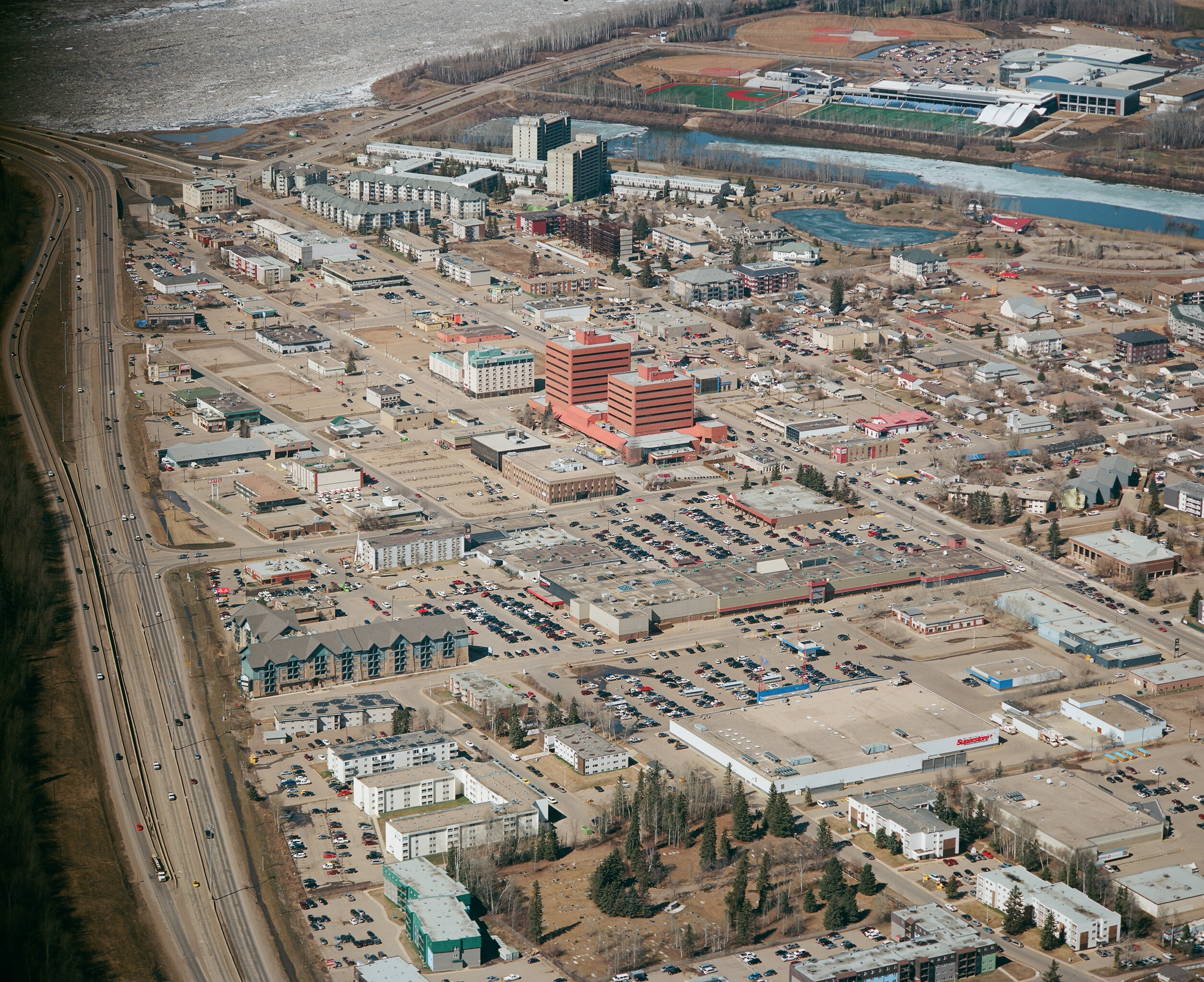
Downtown Fort McMurray

In recent years, Fort McMurray has seen significant additional retail investment, centred in Eagle Ridge, and now largely on the Parsons Creek Town Centre in the city's north end. Developer Allard Developments has planned the site to accommodate up to 500,000 square feet of retail space when fully built.

A new Walmart Supercentre broke ground at Parsons Creek in September 2025, as part of a $300 million Walmart Canada investment across Alberta. At roughly 140,000 square feet, the new store will be 45,000 square feet larger than the existing downtown Walmart, which it is expected to replace, with an opening window projected between 2026 and 2027. In June 2026, Allard Developments announced that Winners and HomeSense would open their first combined location in the region at Parsons Creek, occupying approximately 42,500 square feet.

Separately, The Home Depot broke ground on an 80,000-square-foot store on Quarry Ridge Drive in 2025, its 183rd location in Canada and 28th in Alberta, with an opening planned for spring 2026. The store, the company's northernmost in the country, was expected to create approximately 150 new jobs.

== Sports and recreation ==
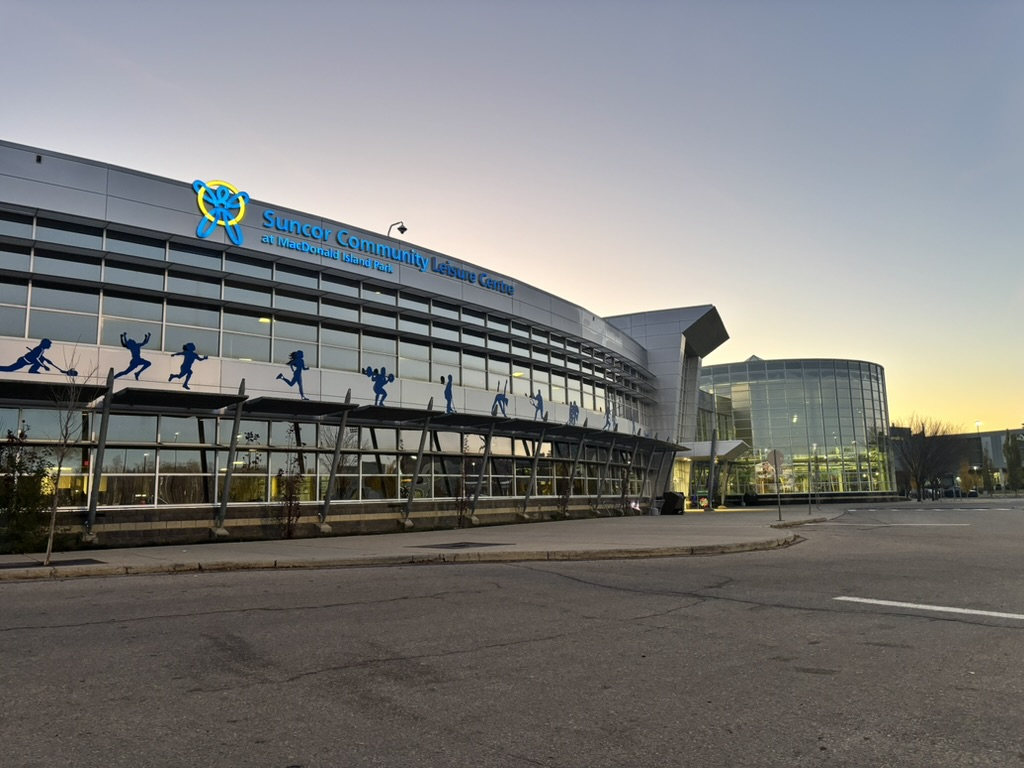
The Suncor Community Leisure Centre at MacDonald Island Park, October 2025

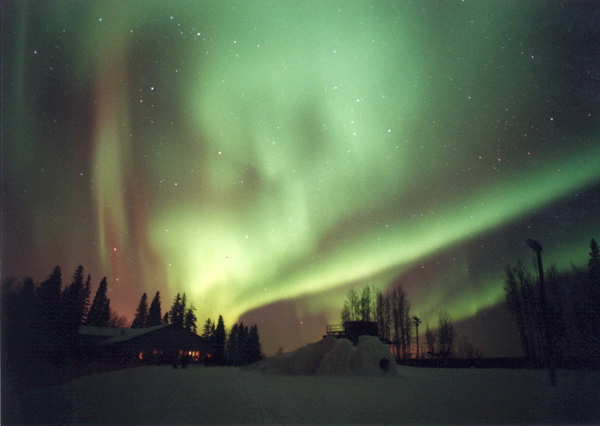
Northern lights over Fort McMurray

Local teams include the Fort McMurray Oil Barons of the Alberta Junior Hockey League (AJHL), the Fort McMurray Giants of the Western Canadian Baseball League (WCBL), and the Keyano Huskies of the Alberta Colleges Athletics Conference (ACAC).

The MacDonald Island Park recreation centre is located on MacDonald Island north-east of downtown. The centre contains the Wood Buffalo Regional Library, indoor water park, basketball, squash courts, rock climbing, fitness centre, indoor playground, ice rinks and public rental space. Shell Place, a connected recreational facility, and a seasonal golf course surround the centre. Fort McMurray Knights Rugby Football Club is also based in the town.

Fort McMurray has hosted several major winter multi-sport events. The region hosted the Alberta Winter Games in 1992 and again in 2018, with the 2018 games bringing nearly 2,000 athletes and more than 5,000 visitors to the community. Fort McMurray also hosted the Arctic Winter Games in 2004 and again in 2023, when the Regional Municipality of Wood Buffalo welcomed nearly 1,700 participants from eight contingents across the circumpolar North between January 29 and February 4.

In the 1980s, the town hosted the Fort McMurray Rotary Charity Classic, a golf tournament on the Canadian Tour.

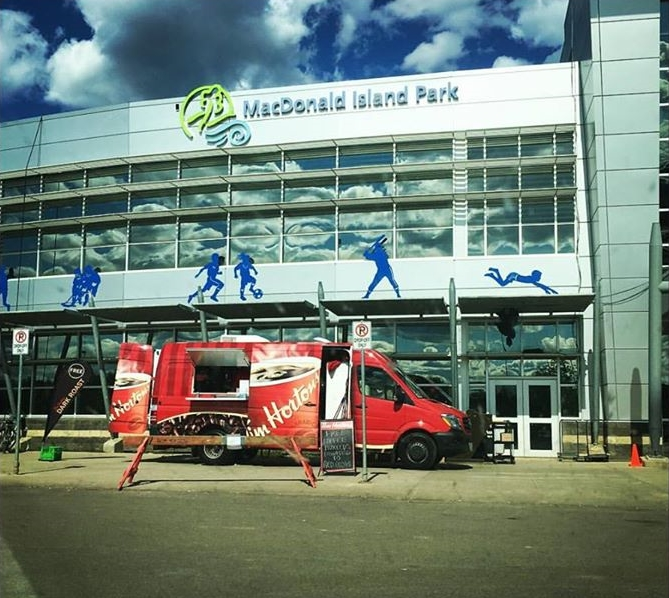
MacDonald Island Park

== Notable people ==
- Tantoo Cardinal, actress
- Mikael Colville-Andersen, urban designer
- Humberly González, actress
- Mark Hartigan, professional hockey player
- Natasha Henstridge, actress
- Aaron Lines, musician
- Cassandra Naud, actress and dancer
- Kudakwashe Rutendo, actress
- Daniel Sunderland, Olympic bobsleigher
- Brooke Voigt, Olympic snowboarder
- Massey Whiteknife, business executive and musician
- Chris Phillips, professional hockey player
- Scottie Upshall, professional hockey player
- Tany Yao, paramedic, firefighter, politician
- Carter Yakemchuk (born 2005), ice hockey player, picked 7th overall in 2024 NHL draft by Ottawa Senators
- Shannon-Ogbnai Abeda, first Winter Olympian from Eritrea

== See also ==
- List of former urban municipalities in Alberta
- Media in Fort McMurray
- Shell Place
- Regional Municipality of Wood Buffalo
- McMurray Formation
- Quarry of the Ancestors
- Beaver River sandstone
- Beaver River Quarry
- Cree Burn Lake Archaeological Site
- Fort McKay First Nation
- Moccasin Flats (Fort McMurray)
- Borealopelta
- Nichollssaura
