= École McTavish Public High School =

Location
- 352 Parsons Creek Drive; Fort McMurray, Alberta, T9K 0C8; Canada; 56°43′45″N 111°22′27″W

Information
- School type: High School
- Founded: 2011
- School board: Fort McMurray Public School District
- Grades: 7 - 12
- Age range: 11 - 18
- Language: English, French
- Colours: Blue, Green & White
- Team name: McTavish Marauders
- Website: ecolemctavish.fmpsdschools.ca

École McTavish Public High School is a public high school located in Fort McMurray, Alberta and is part of the Fort McMurray Public School District.

== History ==
After 24 months of construction (with a budget of $40,850,000), the school allowed students to attend classes on September 1, 2011. However, the school officially opened on September 22, 2011. École McTavish is named after Douglas Craig McTavish and Cassia McTavish. Douglas Craig McTavish was the first Fort McMurray Public School Board Superintendent. He was hired to build the first school and accomplished this by using pine logs from the surrounding environment. After completion, McTavish left but soon returned in 1913 with his wife Cassia Craig. Cassia who was a pioneer in her own right, taught 13 students in the region for five years without pay. In 1914, McTavish made the first school tax assessment. For his efforts, McTavish was later appointed Justice of the Peace.

École McTavish's atrium wall features a 20 foot by 14 foot actual 1912 picture of the first log school with Douglas Craig and Cassia McTavish standing beside it.

In September 2018 the school expanded to include Grades 10-12, complete with renovations to the current building and a large addition to the existing school totaling $30 million.

== School Site ==
The core school area is 8804 square meters (94, 768 square feet). The initial capacity is 800 students which doubled to 1600 students with the high school expansion in 2018.

The school houses over $750,000 in solar panels, an indoor greenhouse, and outdoor gardens as part of its environmental initiatives.

The building also features a theatre with lighting and sound, a state-of-the-art dance studio, three gymnasiums, two separate learning commons areas (one for Grades 7-9 and one for Grades 10-12), welding and automotive facilities, technology suites for animation and coding, culinary arts facilities, and daily hot lunch service.

== Curriculum ==
The school follows the national curriculum. Math, science, social studies, and language arts are the four core subjects. There are also optional courses like robotics, cooking, recreational leadership, music, etc.

In the 2017-2018 school year, McTavish's sports teams won 16 out of a possible 20 Junior High City Championships in sports, including basketball, volleyball, badminton, track and field, and cross country.

The school's robotics teams have travelled to international competitions, and have also had great success across Alberta.

Their music programming includes concert band, jazz band, glee, show choir, guitar, and annual musical productions.

== See also ==
- List of Alberta school boards
- Fort McMurray Public School District
