= Humberly González =

Venezuelan and Canadian actress (born 1992)

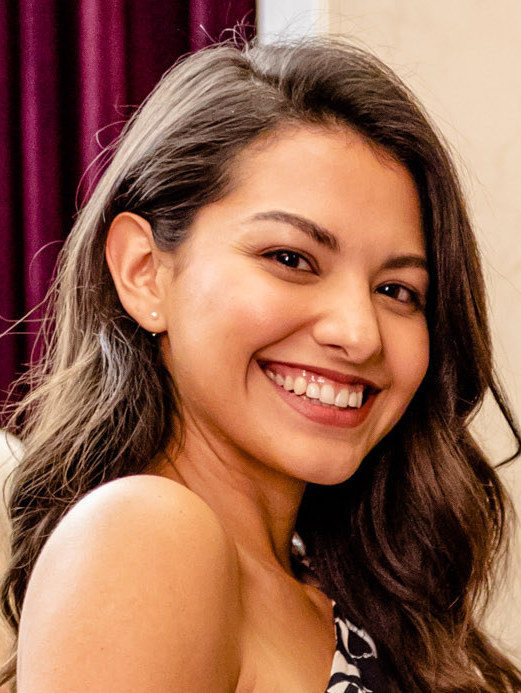
- González in 2020
- Born: April 14, 1992 (age 34); Punto Fijo, Venezuela
- Citizenship: Venezuela; Canada
- Education: Westwood Community High School
- Occupation: Actress
- Years active: 2012–present

Humberly González (born April 14, 1992) is a Venezuelan and Canadian actress, best known for her role as Kay Vess in the 2024 video game Star Wars Outlaws.

== Early life and career ==
Humberly González was born on April 14, 1992, and grew up in Punto Fijo in Venezuela. Her family moved to Aruba when she was 12, and to Canada in 2007; she lived in Alberta, Quebec, and Ontario. González attended Westwood Community High School in Fort McMurray, Alberta, where she performed in productions of Joseph and the Amazing Technicolour Dreamcoat and Urinetown in lead roles. One of González's first acting auditions was a community theatre performance of High School Musical at Keyano Theatre in Fort McMurray, performing as Gabriella Montez.

González graduated from the National Theatre School of Canada in 2015. She began her career with appearances in short films and television series in the 2010s, appearing as Ana in two episodes of Orphan Black. She subsequently had recurring roles in the television series Utopia Falls, Ginny & Georgia and Nurses, and had a major supporting role in the 2022 film Stay the Night.

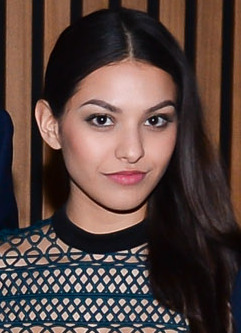
González in 2017.

In 2023, González acted opposite Ali Liebert in Friends and Family Christmas, The Hallmark Channel's first Christmas romantic comedy featuring a lesbian couple.

In 2024, she played the leading role in the video game Star Wars Outlaws, for which she received nominations at the Golden Joystick Awards, the Game Awards 2024, and the British Academy Games Awards.

In addition to her Star Wars work, she appeared in the 2025 Paramount+ film Star Trek: Section 31 as Melle, a Deltan agent of Section 31.

== Personal life ==
González came out as queer in a 2021 interview on the Girl on Girl podcast.

== Filmography ==
=== Film ===
Year	Title	Role	Notes
2017	Kodachrome	Eve	
2018	We	Gabriela	
2019	Witches in the Woods	Mia	
2021	Nobody	Lupita Martin	
2021	PAW Patrol: The Movie	Additional Voices	Voice role
2021	Thomas & Friends: Race for the Sodor Cup	Farona	Voice role
2022	Stay the Night	Joni	
2022	Slumberland	Graciela	
2024	Tarot	Madeline	
2024	A Hundred Lies	Fiona	
2025	Star Trek: Section 31	Melle	
2025	Match	Paola	
2025	Falsehood	Stanfield	
TBA	We Could Be Heroes †	—N/a	Filming
