= Moccasin Flats (Fort McMurray) =

Settlement

Moccasin Flats was an Indigenous and Métis riverside settlement located in Fort McMurray, Alberta, Canada. Situated along the southern bank of the Snye River at the confluence of the Athabasca and Clearwater rivers, the settlement served as a vital cultural and seasonal home for Métis, Cree, and Dene families. Between 1975 and 1981, the New Town of Fort McMurray, in collaboration with private corporate interests, cleared the land and evicted its residents to make way for urban development and housing projects. At least 12 to 14 families were displaced without financial compensation, contributing to long-term socio-economic displacement.

== History and community life ==
The area known as Moccasin Flats is part of Nistawoyou, a Cree word meaning "where three rivers meet." Following the 1910 Dominion Survey of Fort McMurray, parts of the site were officially designated as River Lot 5 and the Clearwater Road Allowance.

For decades, the settlement functioned as a hub for local Indigenous families, with records of Métis inhabitants dating back to 1870. Residents typically used Moccasin Flats as a primary base during the spring and summer, while during the winter, community members traveled to outlying regions to manage family traplines.

== Forced eviction (1975–1981) ==
During the rapid oil sands economic expansion of the 1970s, the municipal government of Fort McMurray faced housing shortages and urban space constraints. Between 1975 and 1981, the Town of Fort McMurray collaborated with Northward Developments Ltd., a housing subsidiary of Syncrude Canada, to evict the Moccasin Flats families to build the Syncrude Towers housing complex and a proposed marina, which was never built. By labelling the Moccasin Flats residents "squatters," the Town used property law to justify their eviction and set aside their Indigenous identity, history, and land rights.

A December 1976 draft development agreement between Northward Developments and the Town of Fort McMurray stated that a road allowance would be sold to Northward, while residents of Moccasin Flats would be removed, with the town assisting relocation through provincial programs. Researchers cautioned that while documents suggest Northward Developments worked with the town on the evictions, the research does not definitively show Syncrude itself directly orchestrated the removals. The land was subsequently redeveloped into an apartment complex historically known as the Syncrude Towers. Displaced residents received no financial restitution or land compensation for their losses.

== Modern findings and advocacy ==
The eviction remained a largely undocumented chapter of local history until 2018, when McMurray Métis (Local 1935) commissioned a historical investigation led by researchers Dr. Tara Joly and Hereward Longley. The resulting report, The Moccasin Flats Evictions: Métis Home, Forced Relocation, and Resilience in Fort McMurray, Alberta, drew on provincial archives, local news records, and oral histories from surviving Elders to document the municipal and corporate roles in the clearances.

Community advocates have called for a formal public apology, compensation for descendants of the evicted families, and the construction of a historical monument and Indigenous cultural centre at the Snye River site, along with reconstruction of the Snye dike to restore natural water flow.

Separately, McMurray Métis has been developing a Métis Cultural Centre at MacDonald Island Park in downtown Fort McMurray, near the original Moccasin Flats site. Originally budgeted at $22 million, the project faced significant cost increases and construction was paused in October 2022 amid funding shortfalls, with projected costs rising as high as $115–125 million. Following a redesign process throughout 2025 that reduced remaining completion costs by roughly 60 percent, major construction resumed in the fall of 2026, with funding contributions from municipal, provincial, and federal governments as well as industry partners including Suncor Energy, Imperial Oil, and Canadian Natural Resources. The completed centre is intended to include museum and exhibition galleries, event and programming space, and facilities for land-based learning and cultural education.

== See also ==
- Métis in Canada
- Fort McMurray
- Fort McKay First Nation
- History of the petroleum industry in Canada (oil sands and heavy oil)
