= Beaver River Quarry =

Precontact archaeological site

Beaver River Quarry (Borden number HgOv-29) is a precontact archaeological site situated on approximately 49 hectares of land just north of the confluence of Beaver Creek and the Athabasca River in northern Alberta, Canada. It is designated a Provincial Historic Resource and is one of two major identified sources of Beaver River sandstone (also known as Beaver River Silicified Sandstone, or BRSS), a toolstone widely used by precontact peoples across northeastern Alberta.

== Description ==
Set amidst a stand of jack pine on the rim of the Athabasca River valley, the site represents the first identified source of BRSS. The material exhibits characteristics well suited to stone tool manufacture, and evidence of prehistoric quarrying and tool production can be found in abundance at the site, including thousands of debris flakes from stone tool manufacture. BRSS has represented the predominant choice of tool stone for human groups occupying the Lower Athabasca River area throughout the precontact period.

== Significance ==
The heritage value of the Beaver River Quarry lies in its repeated use by precontact human groups as a source of BRSS for stone tool manufacture. Since the site's discovery, BRSS sourced from the quarry has been identified in numerous archaeological sites across northern and central Alberta, representing a wide array of precontact activities. Along with the Quarry of the Ancestors, a larger complex of roughly 80 sites located in the Muskeg River Valley, the Beaver River Quarry is considered one of the two major sources of BRSS in the region.

== See also ==
- Quarry of the Ancestors
- Beaver River sandstone
- Cree Burn Lake Archaeological Site
- Fort McKay First Nation
