= Cree Burn Lake Archaeological Site =

Archaeological site

Cree Burn Lake Archaeological Site is a precontact archaeological site located on the east side of the Athabasca River, approximately 60 kilometres north of Fort McMurray, Alberta, Canada, within the traditional territory of the Fort McKay First Nation. It was designated a Provincial Historic Resource on August 10, 1999.

== Name and location ==
The site takes its name from a nearby backwater lake formed in an abandoned oxbow of the Athabasca River. The lake is known as Ena Kerin Ka (Burnt Cree Lake) to the Cree and Métis residents of Fort McKay, and as Isadore's Lake to Chipewyan residents. It lies within the broader Cree Burn Lake–Kearl Lake lowland, an area where archaeologists have identified approximately 400 archaeological sites in total.

== Description ==
The site is approximately 445 acres (180 ha) in size and is internally complex, containing large numbers of stone artifacts, cultural diagnostic tools, and distinct internal activity areas. In some areas, the site preserves stratified cultural deposits associated with organic horizons. The Alberta Register of Historic Places describes Cree Burn Lake as larger and more complex than the nearby Beaver River Quarry site, itself a designated Provincial Historic Resource.

The surrounding lowland was historically a traditional resource-procurement area, used for fishing, fowling, trapping, and hunting deer and moose, as well as for gathering medicinal plants and berries. Wood bison seasonally frequented the area until overhunting drove the local population to near-extinction by the mid-19th century.

== Regional context ==
Cree Burn Lake lies within the Athabasca oil sands region, an area containing one of the highest concentrations of precontact archaeological sites in the boreal forest of western Canada, largely identified through historic resource impact assessments conducted ahead of industrial development. The landscape in this area was shaped by the catastrophic Agassiz Flood roughly 9,900 years ago, when the retreat of glacial Lake Agassiz's meltwaters carved a complex of ridges, benches, and former shorelines that in turn influenced patterns of precontact human settlement.

The lowland is geologically and archaeologically linked to other major precontact sites in the region, including the Quarry of the Ancestors and the Beaver River Quarry, both sources of Beaver River sandstone, a toolstone widely used by precontact peoples across northeastern Alberta.

== See also ==
- Quarry of the Ancestors
- Beaver River sandstone
- Fort McKay First Nation
- Athabasca oil sands
