= Fort McMurray Public School District =

School division in Alberta, Canada

Fort McMurray Public School Division

Location
- 231 Hardin Street; Fort McMurray, Alberta; T9H 2G2 Canada
- Coordinates: 56°43′46″N 111°22′28″W

District information
- Superintendent: Annalee Nutter
- Chair of the board: Linda Mywaart
- Schools: 16 (as of 2023)
- Budget: CA$95.2 million (2019/2020)

Students and staff
- Students: 6,033 (approx. as of 2019)

Other information
- Elected trustees: Angela Adams; Tim O'Hara; Malcolm Setter; Lorna Spargo; Tim O'Hara; Jonathan Lambert; Jason Schulz
- Website: fmpsdschools.ca

Fort McMurray Public School District or the FMPSD is a publicly funded school district, serving the urban service area of Fort McMurray, Alberta, Canada and the outlying areas.

== Schools ==
- Elementary Schools
  - Beacon Hill School (ECDP-6)
  - Christina Gordon Public School (ECDP-6)
  - Dave McNeilly Public School (ECDP-6)
  - Doctor K. A. Clark School (ECDP-6)
  - Ecolé Dickinsfield School (ECDP-6, English and French immersion.)
  - Greely Road School (ECDP-6)
  - Thickwood Heights School (ECDP-6)
  - Timberlea School (ECDP-6)
  - Walter & Gladys Hill (ECDP-6)
  - Westview School (ECDP-6)
- Senior High School
  - Composite High School (7-12)
  - École McTavish Public High School (7-12, English and French immersion.)
  - Westwood Community High School (7-12, English and French immersion.)
- Alternative and Special Programs
  - Fort McMurray Islamic School (ECDP to Grade 9)
  - Fort McMurray Christian School (ECDP-9)
  - Frank Spragins High School (formerly Second Chance School) (9-12, Alternative module-based program.)

== See also ==
- List of Alberta school boards
- Fort McMurray Catholic School District
