= 2023 Arctic Winter Games =

Multi-sports competition

2023 Arctic Winter Games Wood Buffalo
- Host city: Fort McMurray; Anzac; Fort McKay
- Country: Canada; Northern Alberta
- Nations: 6 countries: Canada; Denmark; Finland; Norway; Sweden; United States
- Teams: 8 contingents: Alaska; Greenland; Northern Alberta; Northwest Territories; (Quebec) Nunavik Québec; Nunavut; Sápmi; Yukon
- Opening: January 29, 2023
- Closing: February 4, 2023
- Website: awg2023.org

The 2023 Arctic Winter Games was a winter multi-sport event which took place in the Regional Municipality of Wood Buffalo in Northern Alberta from 29 January to 4 February 2023. The Games were originally scheduled to take place in March 2022, but was rescheduled due to the COVID-19 pandemic.

The Arctic Winter Games is the world's largest multisport and cultural event for young people of the Arctic. The Games is an international biennial celebration of circumpolar sports and culture held for a week, each time with a different nation or region as the host. AWG celebrates sports, social interaction and culture. The Games contributes to creating an awareness on cultural diversity, and develops athletes to participate in the competitions with the focus on fair play. The games bind the Arctic countries together and include traditional games such as Arctic sports and Dené games.

== Organization ==
The 2023 Games took place in Wood Buffalo in Northern Alberta, Canada. Nicole Clow was the general manager of the games.

=== Marketing ===
The mascot of the 2023 games is a lynx named Nitotem. The name translates to "my friend" in the Cree language. The mascot was designed by Sadie Antoine from Fort McMurray, after she won a design contest.

=== Participants ===
Eight contingents are set to participate in the 2023 Arctic Winter Games.

- Alaska, United States
- Greenland
- Northern Alberta, Canada (host)
- Northwest Territories, Canada
- Nunavik, Quebec, Canada
- Nunavut, Canada
- Sámi people
- Yukon, Canada

Athletes from the Russian region of Yamalo-Nenets did not participate in the 2023 Arctic Winter Games due to the 2022 Russian invasion of Ukraine.

== Venues ==
The 2023 were held at various sports venues, schools and facilities in Fort McMurray, Anzac and Fort McKay.

=== Sports venues ===
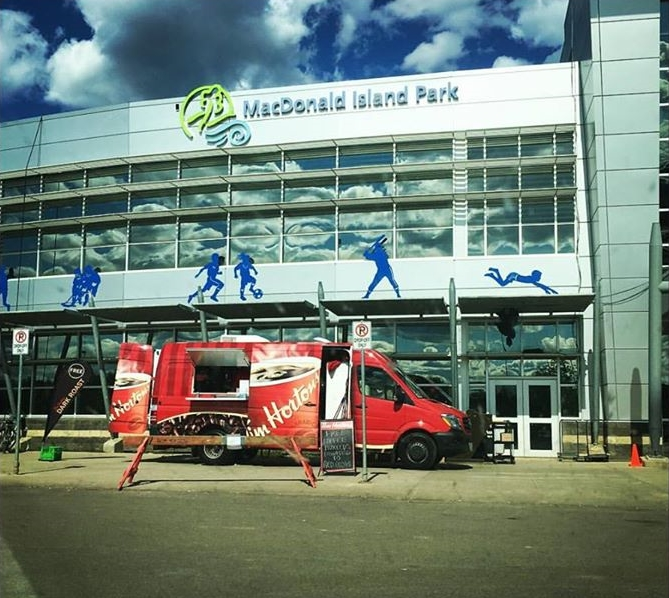
MacDonald Island Park in Fort McMurray

The following venues hosted events during the 2023 Arctic Winter Games.

Venue	Events
Anzac Recreation Centre, Anzac	Badminton, table tennis
Birchwood Trails, Fort McMurray	Cross country skiing, snowshoeing
Centrefire Place, Fort McMurray	Ice hockey
Fort McKay Arena, Fort McKay	Short track speed skating
Frank Lacroix Arena, Fort McMurray	Figure skating
Nexen Energy Fieldhouse, Fort McMurray	Arctic sports
Shell Place, MacDonald Island Park, Fort McMurray	Archery
Suncor Community Leisure Centre, Fort McMurray	Curling, Dene games, ice hockey
Syncrude Sport & Wellness Centre, Fort McMurray	Basketball, futsal, volleyball
Vista Ridge All Seasons Park, Fort McMurray	Alpine skiing, snowboarding
TBD	Biathlon, gymnastics, snowshoe biathlon, wrestling

== The Games ==
=== Sports ===
Twenty sports were held at the 2023 Arctic Winter Games. Archery made its debut in the modern games, having appeared only once before in the 1974 Arctic Winter Games. Alpine skiing returned to the games after not appearing in 2018. Dog mushing was removed from the program and did not appear. Four skiing sports were held, with alpine skiing, biathlon, cross-country skiing and snowboarding. Two snowshoe events were held, with snowshoe biathlon and snowshoeing. Two racquet sports were held, with badminton and table tennis. Two skating events were held, with figure skating and short track speed skating. Team sports that were held were basketball, futsal, ice hockey, volleyball and curling. Traditional Inuit sports were also held, with Arctic sports, Dene games, and wrestling, the latter also including events for traditional wrestling. Also scheduled were gymnastics and archery.

- Alpine skiing
- Archery
- Arctic sports
- Badminton
- Basketball
- Biathlon
- Cross-country skiing

- Curling
- Dene games
- Figure skating
- Futsal
- Gymnastics
- Ice hockey
- Short track speed skating

- Snowboarding
- Snowshoe biathlon
- Snowshoeing
- Table tennis
- Volleyball
- Wrestling

== Medal tally ==
* Host nation (Alberta North)

Rank	Team	Gold	Silver	Bronze	Total
1	Yukon	61	57	51	169
2	Alaska	58	44	44	146
3	Northwest Territories	43	28	35	106
4	Alberta North*	42	60	42	144
5	Greenland	38	22	25	85
6	Nunavut	12	14	25	51
7	Nunavik Quebec	6	21	9	36
8	Sápmi	5	12	9	26
Totals (8 entries)		265	258	240	763

== Culture ==
The Arctic Winter Games celebrates culture and creates in the participants an awareness of cultural similarities and dissimilarities. Cultural exchange and social interaction are important parts of the Games. Each participating contingent contributes with performances in dance, song, music, plays or art. These cultural events reflect the traditional as well as the modern cultures of the Arctic.

== Hodgson Trophy ==
At each Arctic Winter Games, the AWG International Committee presents the Hodgson Trophy to the contingent whose athletes best exemplify the ideals of fair play and team spirit. Team members also receive a distinctive pin in recognition of their accomplishment.

== Medallists ==
=== Archery ===
Event	Gold	Silver	Bronze
Boys' barebow	Mitchell Aitken Rudolph; Yukon	Austin Dougherty; Alberta North	Harrison Ian Dolding; Yukon
Girls' barebow	Mattea Visser; Alberta North	Em Gilmour; Northwest Territories	Juliette Greetham; Yukon
Team barebow	Northwest Territories; Em Gilmour; Josh Wedzin	Yukon; Juliette Greetham; Mitchell Aitken Rudolph	Alberta North; Austin Dougherty; Mattea Visser
Boys' compound	Hayden Wallace; Yukon	Emmett Kapaniuk; Yukon	Ethan Utz; Alberta North
Girls' compound	Jorgie Visser; Alberta North	Julianne Elizabeth Groenewegen; Northwest Territories	Amelia Paziuk; Northwest Territories
Team compound	Yukon; Emmett Kapaniuk; Delia Therriault	Alberta North; Ethan Utz; Jorgie Visser	Yukon; Riley Grace Cyre; Hayden Wallace

=== Arctic sports ===
2005

Event	Gold	Silver	Bronze
Boys' all-around	Colton James Paul; Alaska	Nicas Clasen; Greenland	Lars Jeremiassen; Greenland
Boys' 1-foot high kick	Colton James Paul; Alaska	Leif Richards; Alaska	Nicas Clasen; Greenland
Boys' 2-foot high kick	Colton James Paul; Alaska	Peter Joseph Griggs; Alaska	Lars Jeremiassen; Greenland
Boys' Alaskan high kick	Colton James Paul; Alaska	Alex Covey; Alaska	Lars Jeremiassen; Greenland
Boys' kneel jump	Colton James Paul; Alaska	Augustin Greetham; Yukon	Inutsiaq Rosing; Greenland
Boys' sledge jump	Nicas Clasen; Greenland	Lars Jeremiassen; Greenland	Jordan Wills; Alberta North
Boys' triple jump	Colton James Paul; Alaska	Nicas Clasen; Greenland	Leif Richards; Alaska
Boys' arm pull	Nicas Clasen; Greenland	Qajaaq Ittinuar; Nunavut	Angunnguaq Mathiassen; Greenland
Girls' all-around	Randi Sigurdsen; Greenland	Lydia Aurora Grace Alverts; Alaska	shared silver
Girls' all-around	Randi Sigurdsen; Greenland	Mona Fleischer; Greenland	shared silver
Girls' 1-foot high kick	Lydia Aurora Grace Alverts; Alaska	Randi Sigurdsen; Greenland	Mona Fleischer; Greenland
Girls' 2-foot high kick	Randi Sigurdsen; Greenland	Amélie Guilbeault; Yukon	Charity Gordon; Alaska
Girls' Alaskan high kick	Mona Fleischer; Greenland	Kate Koepke; Yukon	Randi Sigurdsen; Greenland
Girls' kneel jump	Sascha Nelson; Yukon	Sam Ladwig; Alberta North	Mary Jane Qinuayuak; Nunavik
Girls' sledge jump	Amélie Guilbeault; Yukon	Mona Fleischer; Greenland	Dani Kachnic; Alberta North
Girls' triple jump	Leah Marie Evans; Alaska	Lydia Aurora Grace Alverts; Alaska	Randi Sigurdsen; Greenland
Girls' arm pull	Lydia Aurora Grace Alverts; Alaska	Sascha Nelson; Yukon	Lyric Ashenfelter; Alaska

Open

Event	Gold	Silver	Bronze
Boys' all-around	Parker Benjamin Kenick; Alaska	shared gold	Steffen Knulst; Greenland
Boys' all-around	Kyle Worl; Alaska	shared gold	Steffen Knulst; Greenland
Boys' 1-foot high kick	Parker Benjamin Kenick; Alaska	Aloupa Watt; Nunavik	Steffen Knulst; Greenland
Boys' 2-foot high kick	Parker Benjamin Kenick; Alaska	Steffen Knulst; Greenland	Kyle Worl; Alaska
Boys' Alaskan high kick	Ezra Elisoff; Alaska	Kyle Worl; Alaska	Matthew Jordan Quinto; Alaska
Boys' kneel jump	Parker Benjamin Kenick; Alaska	James Tautu; Nunavut	Kyle Worl; Alaska
Boys' airplane	Kyle Worl; Alaska	Chris Stipdonk; Northwest Territories	Tittu Wille; Greenland
Boys' 1-hand reach	Parker Benjamin Kenick; Alaska	Kyle Worl; Alaska	Chris Stipdonk; Northwest Territories
Boys' head pull	Steffen Knulst; Greenland	James Williams; Northwest Territories	Inuuteq Josefsen; Greenland
Boys' knuckle hop	Chris Stipdonk; Northwest Territories	Kyle Worl; Alaska	Parker Benjamin Kenick; Alaska
Boys' sledge jump	Chris Stipdonk; Northwest Territories	Steffen Knulst; Greenland	Kyle Worl; Alaska
Boys' triple jump	James Williams; Northwest Territories	Steffen Knulst; Greenland	Inuuteq Josefsen; Greenland
Girls' all-around	Veronica Leigh McDonald; Northwest Territories	Amber Jeannine Vaska; Alaska	Emma Noskey; Alberta North
Girls' all-around	Veronica Leigh McDonald; Northwest Territories	Amber Jeannine Vaska; Alaska	Danica Pissuyui Taylor; Northwest Territories
Girls' 1-foot high kick	Danica Pissuyui Taylor; Northwest Territories	Petra Amossen; Greenland	Emma Noskey; Alberta North
Girls' 2-foot high kick	Veronica Leigh McDonald; Northwest Territories	Danica Pissuyui Taylor; Northwest Territories	Amber Jeannine Vaska; Alaska
Girls' Alaskan high kick	Veronica Leigh McDonald; Northwest Territories	Leila Kell; Alaska	Petra Amossen; Greenland
Girls' kneel jump	Veronica Leigh McDonald; Northwest Territories	Amber Jeannine Vaska; Alaska	Leila Kell; Alaska
Girls' sledge jump	Emma Noskey; Alberta North	Hanne Mathiassen; Greenland	Veronica Leigh McDonald; Northwest Territories
Girls' triple jump	Emma Noskey; Alberta North	Veronica Leigh McDonald; Northwest Territories	Amber Jeannine Vaska; Alaska
Girls' arm pull	Veronica Leigh McDonald; Northwest Territories	Danica Pissuyui Taylor; Northwest Territories	Aaka Tobiassen; Greenland

=== Badminton ===
Event	Class	Gold	Silver	Bronze
Boys' singles	2003	Davidee Kudluarok; Nunavut	Emmanuel Duguay; Alberta North	Martin Broberg; Greenland
Girls' singles	2003	Emilie Sørensen; Greenland	Thrune Amassen Rafaelsen; Greenland	Zan Tao; Nunavut
Boys' doubles	2003	Nunavut; Davidee Kudluarok; Terrence Lawson	Alberta North; Emmanuel Duguay; Kai Zhang	Yukon; Glade Roberts; Christopher Tom Tom
Girls' doubles	2003	Greenland; Thrune Amassen Rafaelsen; Emilie Sørensen	Nunavut; Marthajoy Qaqqasiq; Zan Tao	Alberta North; Nimedha De Alwis; Mattaya Lauck
Mixed doubles	2003	Nunavut; Davidee Kudluarok; Zan Tao	Alberta North; Emmanuel Duguay; Mattaya Lauck	Greenland; Martin Broberg; Thrune Amassen Rafaelsen
Boys' singles	2006	Malik Thorsen Petersen; Greenland	Malinnguaq Egede; Greenland	Ved Bhowmik; Alberta North
Girls' singles	2006	Anna Arleth; Greenland	Jonna Bidstrup Andreassen; Greenland	Methma De Silva; Alberta North
Boys' doubles	2006	Greenland; Malinnguaq Egede; Malik Thorsen Petersen	Alberta North; Ved Bhowmik; Dhruv Lunagaria	Nunavut; Rodney Nakoolak; Kenny Takatak
Girls' doubles	2006	Greenland; Jonna Bidstrup Andreassen; Anna Arleth	Alberta North; Methma De Silva; Chelsea Fischer	Nunavut; Tina Martha Mary Kudluarlik; Iris Sowdluapik
Mixed doubles	2006	Greenland; Anna Arleth; Malik Thorsen Petersen	Greenland; Jonna Bidstrup Andreassen; Malinnguaq Egede	Alberta North; Ved Bhowmik; Methma De Silva

=== Basketball ===
Event	Gold	Silver	Bronze
Boys	Yukon; Jonathan Aine; Xien Amador; Angelo Caringal; Nathan Hirsch; Arlow James-Walker; Luke John Palapal; Benjamin Edwad Doran Perreault; Miguel Portea; Gage Sweeney; Karl Tesoro	Alberta North; Skyler Broughton; David Chijioke; Seth Dayondon; Joshua Eligado; Kaden Gravengard; Crai Rushfeldt; Kurt Tristan Saluna; Sai Shankar; Tyson Wohlgemuth; Colby Wood	Northwest Territories; Nathan Dayman; Nicholas Dayman; Gabriel Fillion; Brendan McAllister; Jozuard Ashton Mercado; Jack Nevitt; Dwayne Raddi; Francesco Stefanos; Justin Stewart; Rex Steele Turner
Girls	Alberta North; Dani Cadieux; Avery Gnam; Hannah Haas; Tyla Hammermaster; Alexis Lee; Josie Lund; Kadison McLeod; Olivia Rozinsky; Ciera Schoenroth; Laurel van der Giessen	Yukon; Arian Batallones; Zoe Benitah; Willow Berkman; Rue Charchun; Jaidan Rodica Curteanu; Maya Heebink; Grace Isabella Machtans; Robyn Mueller; Sarah Svoboda; Mya Alexandria Warren	Northwest Territories; Saia Brown; Jaci Dusome; Jillian French; Lily Lloyd; Kaylie Locke-Setter; Mia Locke-Setter; Abigail Elise Kodzin Nevitt; Lily Helenrose Newberry; Katherine Smallwood; Taya Michele Straker

=== Curling ===
Event	Class	Gold	Silver	Bronze
Boys	2004	Alberta North; Varyk Doepker; Carter Furgeson; Robert Nelson; Cortland Sonnenberg	Alaska; Coleman Martin; Dylan Skaggs; Tyler Skaggs; Jimmy Evans	Yukon; Carlos Magsucang; Nathan Iskra; Roman Snider; Charles Snider
Girls	2004	Northwest Territories; Tamara Bain; Brooke Smith; Alex Testart-Campbell; Reese Wainman	Alberta North; Alexandra Collins; Brylee Girard; Lola Rasi; Hayden Young	Alaska; Ainsley Persinger; Melanie Richards; Charlie Clark; Melissa Richards
Mixed doubles	2004	Varyk Doepker (ABN); Brooke Smith (NWT)	Cortland Sonnenberg (ABN); Naja Ejesiak (NU)	Nathan Iskra (YT); Reese Wainman (NWT)

=== Dene games ===
Boys

Event	Class	Gold	Silver	Bronze
All-around	2004	Aqqalu Lukassen; Greenland	Arkaluak Reimer Geisler; Greenland	Eli Gordon; Alaska
Finger pull	2004	Arkaluak Reimer Geisler; Greenland	Aqqalu Lukassen; Greenland	Eli Gordon; Alaska
Snow snake	2004	Troy Clayton Johns; Yukon	Kelly Saviadjuk; Nunavik	Arkaluak Reimer Geisler; Greenland
Stick pull	2004	Aqqalu Lukassen; Greenland	Sammy Kaitak; Nunavik	Marcus Herron; Yukon
Hand games	2004	Yukon; Marcus Herron; Troy Clayton Johns; Kashtyn Daniel Ross Leas; Cashis Peter	Nunavut; Adam Muckpaloo; Levi Natanine; Radley Oyukuluk; Logan Willie	Alberta North; Emery Ahkimnachie; Ashley Chisaakay; Colby Courtoreille; Chase Marcel
Pole push	2004	Greenland; Atsiannguaq Andersen; Arkaluak Reimer Geisler; Aqqalu Lukassen; Kuka Zeeb	Nunavik; Brandon Greig; Sammy Kaitak; Junior Lapage; Kelly Saviadjuk	Northwest Territories; Aiden Andre; Hans Arey; Ty Lafferty; Talynn Sundberg
All-around	Open	Julius Amossen; Greenland	Lloyd Willie; Nunavut	Minik Platou; Greenland
Finger pull	Open	Edvard Kruse; Greenland	Julius Amossen; Greenland	Jens Jørgen Lange; Greenland
Snow snake	Open	Lloyd Willie; Nunavut	Ryan Zane Glenzel; Alaska	Julius Amossen; Greenland
Stick pull	Open	Minik Platou; Greenland	Papituqaq Cain Peters; Nunavik	Lloyd Willie; Nunavut
Hand games	Open	Northwest Territories; Kennen Jack Andre-Blake; Robin Catholique; Gordie Liske; Bryan Taneton	Nunavik; Papituqaq Cain Peters; Matthew Creig; Justin Jones; Gary Metuq	Yukon; Kadin Hare; Justin Johnson; Tyler O'Brien; Darryl Rutledge
Pole push	Open	Greenland; Julius Amossen; Edvard Kruse; Jens Jørgen Lange; Minik Platou	Nunavik; Papituqaq Cain Peters; Matthew Creig; Justin Jones; Gary Metuq	Nunavut; Noah Qaunaq; Collin Tilley; Lionel Willie; Lloyd Willie

Girls

Event	Class	Gold	Silver	Bronze
All-around	2004	Tina Mifsud; Nunavik	Leilani Tukkiapik; Nunavik	Louisa Berthe; Nunavik
Finger pull	2004	Tina Mifsud; Nunavik	Louisa Berthe; Nunavik	Joy Attagutaluk; Nunavut
Snow snake	2004	Leilani Tukkiapik; Nunavik	Tina Mifsud; Nunavik	Louisa Berthe; Nunavik
Stick pull	2004	Tina Mifsud; Nunavik	Ariana Sundberg-Koyina; Northwest Territories	Leilani Tukkiapik; Nunavik
Hand games	2004	Northwest Territories; Monica Elaine Arey; Bridgette Joanna Rose McKay; Ariana Sundberg-Koyina	Nunavut; Gloria Arnauyumayuq; Joy Attagutaluk; Cheryl Tilley; Elaine Lissie Tunraq	Alberta North; Adam Auger-Beaulieu; Mia Danais; Alicia Gladue; Tayah Watkins
Pole push	2004	Nunavik; Louisa Berthe; Tina Mifsud; Eva Papak Annatok; Leilani Tukkiapik	Alberta North; Adam Auger-Beaulieu; Mia Danais; Alicia Gladue; Tayah Watkins	Yukon; Denise Victoria-Lee Griffith; Kiawna Jordan Leas; Angela Prochazka; Madison Silas-Gill
All-around	2006	Zariana Yakinneah; Alberta North	Myra Kendi; Yukon	Jerrica Sanderson; Northwest Territories
Finger pull	2006	Samantha Rupert; Nunavik	Aiva Lingard; Nunavik	Ambriel Rupert; Nunavik
Snow snake	2006	Myra Kendi; Yukon	Taya Gambler; Alberta North	Horizon Willie; Nunavut
Stick pull	2006	Zariana Yakinneah; Alberta North	Alohna Marie Johnson; Alaska	Jerrica Sanderson; Northwest Territories
Hand games	2006	Northwest Territories; Desiree C. L. Charlo; Sifera Kenny; Gabrielle Dolly McLeod; Jerrica Sanderson	Alaska; Alohna Marie Johnson; Wookie Nichols; Taylor Tiedeman; Willow Tiedeman	Yukon; Katelyn Mary Hirsch; Harmony Kendi; Myra Kendi; Isabelle Prochazka
Pole push	2006	Alberta North; Mary Campbell; Taya Gambler; Kota Grandjambe; Zariana Yakinneah	Nunavik; Jessica Berthe; Aiva Lingard; Ambriel Rupert; Samantha Rupert	Northwest Territories; Desiree C. L. Charlo; Sifera Kenny; Gabrielle Dolly McLeod; Jerrica Sanderson

=== Gymnastics ===
Event	Gold	Silver	Bronze
Girls' team all-around	Alaska; Jillian Beckley; Lyza Claire Krozel; Emma Marsh; Alia Lynn McKinnon	Alberta North; Raeanne Biette; Maria Dogbe; Emily Garces-Guillen; Sari Krauskopf	Yukon; Aubree Hombert; Geneviève Marie Lefebvre; Alayna May Mortimer; Chloe Kaia Tatsumi
Girls' individual all-around	Emma Marsh; Alaska	Alia Lynn McKinnon; Alaska	Jillian Beckley; Alaska
Girls' balance beam	Emma Marsh; Alaska	shared gold	Jillian Beckley; Alaska
Girls' balance beam	Alia Lynn McKinnon; Alaska	shared gold	Jillian Beckley; Alaska
Girls' floor	Emma Marsh; Alaska	Alayna May Mortimer; Yukon	Geneviève Marie Lefebvre; Yukon
Girls' uneven bars	Emma Marsh; Alaska	Alia Lynn McKinnon; Alaska	Geneviève Marie Lefebvre; Yukon
Girls' vault	Alia Lynn McKinnon; Alaska	Jillian Beckley; Alaska	Emma Marsh; Alaska

=== Ice hockey ===
Event	Class	Gold	Silver	Bronze
Boys	2004	Nunavut; Max Ammaq; Koby Connelly; Kadin Eetuk; Micah Emiktowt; Chase Harron; Justin Issakiark; Russell Matoo; Steven Nowdlak; Jimmy Ollie; Prime Paniyuk; Terence Pilakapsi; Ray Pudlat Jr. Tucker St. John; Kobe Tanuyak; Sandy Tattuinee; Garren Voisey; Gregory Wiseman	Alaska; Brock Barth; Sam Bigalke; Griffin Lucas Hall; Sam Hemmen; Mason Holler; Sterling Knipper; Colin James McCarthy; John McElmurry; Brody Melocik; Joseph Radiff; Daniel Jacob Ragsdale; Matfey Reutov; Jacob Reuben Simek; Tanner Bobby Thomas; Joe Joe Tapley; Riley Young	Northwest Territories; Telly Banksland-Stefure; Bradley Bartlett; Ethan Alan Bowerman; Braden Brenton; Dylan Bernard Gilles Cummings; Tyler Gordon-Bahr; Riley Hodder; Desmond Hutchings; Carson Impett; River McQueen; Spencer Miller; Gavin Pellissey; Owen Pettipas; Harrison Simmons; Noah Valpy; Michael Van Metre; Conor Wilkins
Boys	2007	Northwest Territories; Jacob Carroll; Nolan Dusome; Nate Harris; Ryan Harris; Mario Hernandez; Griffin Jones; Louis Frederick King; Carter Kuchta; Deacon Stanley Lantz; Callum MacLean; Grayson Mueller; Hayden Murray; Jack Pettipas; Blake Rose; Rylan Scarfe; Corwin Simmons; Ryder Wicks	Alberta North; Ben Antonio; Josh Barore; Spencer Behnsen; Cash Brebant; Ethan Collins; Hunter Colombe; Grayson Conrad; Alex Dubrule; Kai Ducharme; Damian Hill; Jonas Lillo; Cy Nelson; Trinden Noskey; Noah Parker; Rylan Ross; Jake Simmons; Linden Zaichkowsky	Nunavut; Nate Dialla; Michael Donovan; Connor Ejetsiak; Isaiah Harron; Darren Ikakhik Jr. Luke Joy; Ryley Komakjuak; Regan Kopak Jr. Blake Kusugak; Nolan Nakoolak; Joseph Netser; Liam O'Dell; Richard Pameolik; Kylan Saviakjuk; Liam Tattuinee; Nathan Thompson; Keenen Uluqsi
Girls	2003	Alberta North; McKenna Bowers; Taylor Breen; Jordan Brown; Brianna Davis; Carolyn Head; Aydin Hebert; Jamie Hensch; Skylar Hill; Anna Jeffs; Avery Johnson; Macy Robinson; Kaitlyn Senkoe; Hailey Shura; Elly Stone; Théa Thompson; Karsyn Utz; Victoria Willsey	Northwest Territories; Jersey Ashton; Rylie Nicole Beck; Emma Carey; Jenna Demarcke; Kamilah Gostick; Brooklyn Helyar; Julia Heron; Kelsey Paige Impett; Chandelle Leonard; Ellie Loutitt; Abby McDonald; Adrena Isabel McDonald; Kyra McDonald; Hélène McKay-Ivanko; Zoey Remo; Scarlet Tourangeau; Emma Wicks	Yukon; Taylor Bierlmeier; Maya Bulmer; Cassie Cebuliak; Evan Cyre; Alia Drummond; Sophie Drummond; Ella Johnston; Rachel Kormendy; Sophia Emerald Leas; Zoe Jade Leas; Jordan Macdonald; Kasey McKenna; Heidi Nash; Kennedy Debra Lynn O'Brien; Callie Quaile; Emery Twardochleb; Alix Walchuk

=== Volleyball ===
Event	Gold	Silver	Bronze
Boys	Alberta North; Hudson Forbes; Reece Hutchison; Aneesh Jhanwar; Caiden Kim; Trysten Kim; Carson King; Tino Kwatara; Jackson McGillivray; Cooper Paulovich; David Villiger	Yukon; Malakai Alatini; Mark Alfaro; Ben Bonilla; Gabby Cuenza; Pier De Leon; Kurt Rubio; Krish Sharma; Ethan John Stoker; Sebastian Tajonera; Samuel Thorn	Northwest Territories; Ashton Catholique; Joel Catholique; Fraser Dumont; Sean Clayton Grandjambe; Trey Granter; Landin Zakary Thomas Jewell; Jacob Mitchener; Hamza Mourtada; Roald Peters; John Voudrach
Girls	Alberta North; Indira Germain; Reese Holman; Alandra Humbke; Savannah Lambert; Sam Langdon; Natasa Maric; Katelyn Mazurkewich; Emma Park; Tess Weber; Evangeline Zeyha	Alaska; Emma Christiana Beck; Maggie Herschleb; Masen Victoria Holmes; Anika Jensen; Raegan Kingry; Shelby Denise Nukwak-King; Vanessa Schachle; Jade Elizabeth Sharky; Ruby Tansy; Mallory Aroha Welling	Northwest Territories; Gracie Brennan; Keira Denielle Coakwell; Gillian Furniss; Katie Brooke Genge; Andrea Ashley Geraghty; Thea Samantha Marzan; Tamara Mathison; Alanna Pellerin; Giselle Penney; Tanisha Steinwand

=== Wrestling ===
Individual

Event	Gold	Silver	Bronze
Boys' 55 kg	Jonah Kunilusie; Nunavut	Darien Smith; Alberta North	Ben Inuktalik; Northwest Territories
Boys' 60 kg	Liam Gishler; Yukon	Jusipi Dimitruk; Nunavut	Arnhem Bayly; Alberta North
Boys' 65 kg	Ian Simms; Alberta North	Harlan Keefer; Yukon	N/A
Boys' 70 kg	Kaleb Parry; Yukon	Finn Bayly; Alberta North	N/A
Boys' 78 kg	Gabriel Racine; Yukon	Alex Campbell; Alberta North	N/A
Boys' 85 kg	Marcus Karpiak; Alberta North	N/A	N/A
Boys' 96 kg	Dominik Stewart; Alberta North	Hunter Kitekudlak; Northwest Territories	N/A
Girls' 50 kg	Jess LeClair; Alaska	Madison Cardinal; Alberta North	Ki Akpik; Nunavut
Girls' 55 kg	Jaymi Hinchey; Yukon	Megan Baise; Alaska	Omayja Cardinal; Alberta North
Girls' 60 kg	Lia Hinchey; Yukon	Olivia Bennett; Alberta North	Kiana Ekpakohak; Nunavut
Girls' 65 kg	Fielder Bishop; Alberta North	Leah Elizabeth McLean; Yukon	N/A
Girls' 71 kg	Brooke Evans; Alberta North	N/A	N/A

Inuit wrestling

Event	Gold	Silver	Bronze
Boys' 55 kg	Jonah Kunilusie; Nunavut	Darien Smith; Alberta North	Ben Inuktalik; Northwest Territories
Boys' 60 kg	Jusipi Dimitruk; Nunavut	Liam Gishler; Yukon	Arnhem Bayly; Alberta North
Boys' 65 kg	Ian Simms; Alberta North	Harlan Keefer; Yukon	N/A
Boys' 70 kg	Kaleb Parry; Yukon	Finn Bayly; Alberta North	N/A
Boys' 78 kg	Alex Campbell; Alberta North	Gabriel Racine; Yukon	N/A
Boys' 85 kg	Marcus Karpiak; Alberta North	N/A	N/A
Boys' 96 kg	Dominik Stewart; Alberta North	Hunter Kitekudlak; Northwest Territories	N/A
Girls' 50 kg	Jess LeClair; Alaska	Madison Cardinal; Alberta North	Ki Akpik; Nunavut
Girls' 55 kg	Jaymi Hinchey; Yukon	Megan Baise; Alaska	Omayja Cardinal; Alberta North
Girls' 60 kg	Lia Hinchey; Yukon	Kiana Ekpakohak; Nunavut	Olivia Bennett; Alberta North
Girls' 65 kg	Leah Elizabeth McLean; Yukon	Fielder Bishop; Alberta North	N/A
Girls' 71 kg	Brooke Evans; Alberta North	N/A	N/A

Team

Event	Gold	Silver	Bronze
Mixed	Alberta North; Arnhem Bayly; Finn Bayly; Olivia Bennett; Fielder Bishop; Alex Campbell; Madison Cardinal; Omayja Cardinal; Brooke Evans; Marcus Karpiak; Ian Simms; Darien Smith; Dominik Stewart	Yukon; Liam Gishler; Jaymi Hinchey; Lia Hinchey; Harlan Keefer; Leah Elizabeth McLean; Kaleb Parry; Gabriel Racine	Nunavut; Isaiah Angutimarik; Jonah Kunilusie

Preceded by South Slave 2018	Arctic Winter Games; Regional Municipality of Wood Buffalo; 2023 Arctic Winter Games	Succeeded by Matanuska-Susitna 2024
