= Quarry of the Ancestors =

Archaeological site in Canada

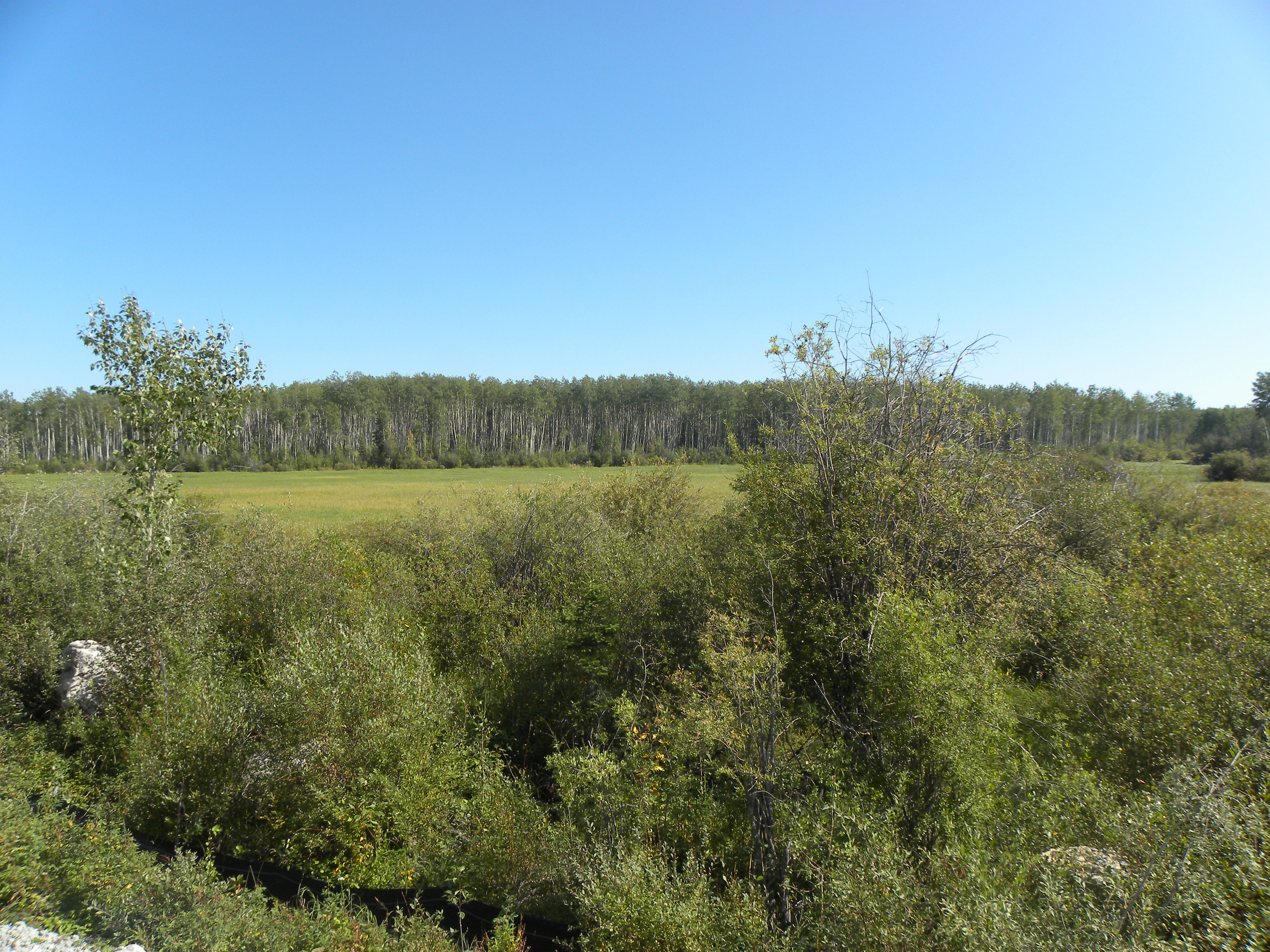
Quarry of the Ancestors, September 2009

Quarry of the Ancestors is a precontact archaeological site and Provincial Historic Resource located approximately 48 kilometres north of Fort McMurray, Alberta, Canada, within the traditional territory of the Fort McKay First Nation. The site is the primary known source of Beaver River Silicified Sandstone (BRSS), a fine-grained orthoquartzite prized by precontact peoples for stone tool production, and comprises a complex of roughly 80 individual archaeological sites spread across an area of about 199 hectares in the Muskeg River Valley. Artifacts recovered from the site indicate occupation and use spanning roughly 9,800 to 1,000 years ago, making it one of the most significant known lithic quarry complexes in northern Alberta.

== Geology and location ==
The Quarry of the Ancestors sits within the rolling mixed boreal forest and wetlands of the Muskeg River Valley and incorporates two extensive surface to near-surface occurrences of BRSS. Despite its name, BRSS is technically an orthoquartzite rather than a true sandstone, characterized by very high silica content and few impurities; its colour ranges from light beige to dark grey, and its texture from fine- to coarse-grained. The stone occurs within the McMurray Formation, the same geological stratum that contains the Athabasca oil sands deposits. BRSS artifacts have been identified as far afield as the Northwest Territories and near Kindersley, Saskatchewan, indicating the material moved across a wide precontact trade and travel network.

== Archaeological significance ==
Fine-grained BRSS suitable for flintknapping had been recognized in archaeological assemblages across northern and central Alberta since the early 1980s, but the coarse-grained quarries then known did not match the material being found, leaving the true source unidentified for decades. In the early 2000s, historic resource impact assessments (HRIAs) conducted ahead of proposed industrial developments near Fort McKay — including a limestone quarry and an oil sands mine expansion — identified a radial increase in fine-grained BRSS artifact density approaching a specific location, leading researchers to the main quarry source.

Since systematic survey work in the wider oil sands region began in 1973, more than 1,000 archaeological sites and nearly 3.8 million artifacts have been recorded, a substantial proportion of which are manufactured from BRSS. These findings substantially revised earlier assumptions that the region had been sparsely occupied before European contact, instead indicating one of the most densely occupied precontact landscapes in northern Alberta.

Diagnostic projectile points recovered from the site place its principal period of use between approximately 9,800 and 1,000 years ago. One notable specimen, a spear point associated with the Goshen/Fort Creek Fen tradition, has been dated to between 9,900 and 9,400 years old.

=== Organic residue analysis ===
Organic residue testing of artifacts associated with the Quarry of the Ancestors has produced some of the most significant biomolecular evidence recovered from a precontact Alberta site. Analysis of a diagnostic projectile point recovered from muskeg deposits identified organic residue consistent with a proboscidian species, likely mammoth or mastodon. Separate residue testing conducted on BRSS tools for a Royal Alberta Museum exhibit on the Quarry returned positive matches for bison, deer, and fish. The proboscidian-positive point was retested but no additional residues were recovered. Researchers have noted that the site's proximity to water-logged muskeg environments, while challenging for excavation, significantly increases the potential for preservation of organic material that would otherwise decompose in Alberta's typically acidic boreal soils.

== Provenance research ==
Because BRSS artifacts recovered elsewhere in Alberta and Saskatchewan can closely resemble similar-looking toolstone originating in Montana, researchers with the Archaeological Survey of Alberta's Lithic Reference Project have used portable X-ray fluorescence (pXRF) analysis to geochemically distinguish BRSS from comparable materials, improving the accuracy of sourcing studies across the province.

== News coverage ==
Coverage of the Quarry of the Ancestors in mainstream Canadian media has been limited. A 2022 dating study led by MacEwan University professor Robin Woywitka, using satellite topography analysis to date sediment layers, received national wire coverage via The Canadian Press, appearing in CBC News on July 31, 2022, and in Global News the same day. Local outlet Fort McMurray Today published its own staff-written coverage of the same findings on August 9, 2022. The site also received earlier feature coverage in Legion Magazine, a national veterans' affairs publication, in a 2006 article on oil sands-region archaeology.

== Designation and consultation ==
The Quarry of the Ancestors is one of three major precontact archaeological sites designated Provincial Historic Resources within Fort McKay First Nation traditional territory, alongside the Beaver River Quarry (Borden number HgOv-29) and the Cree Burn Lake Archaeological Site.

The Quarry of the Ancestors sits on the traditional land of the Fort McKay First Nation. Following its identification in 2003, provincial archaeologists pursued designation of the site as a Provincial Historic Resource, a process that required consultation among surrounding First Nations and industry stakeholders with development interests in the area, including Birch Hills Resources and Shell Canada, given the presence of viable oil sands deposits beneath the site. The consultation process, which involved Alberta's Culture, Multiculturalism and Status of Women ministry along with other government departments, industrial operators, trappers, and Indigenous communities, resulted in the designation of nearly 200 hectares for preservation; the site was formally designated a Provincial Historic Resource in 2012.

== See also ==
- Beaver River sandstone
- Fort McKay First Nation
- Athabasca oil sands
- Head-Smashed-In Buffalo Jump
- List of National Historic Sites of Canada in Alberta
