= Fort McKay =

Fort McKay Fort MacKay
- Indigenous settlement and hamlet
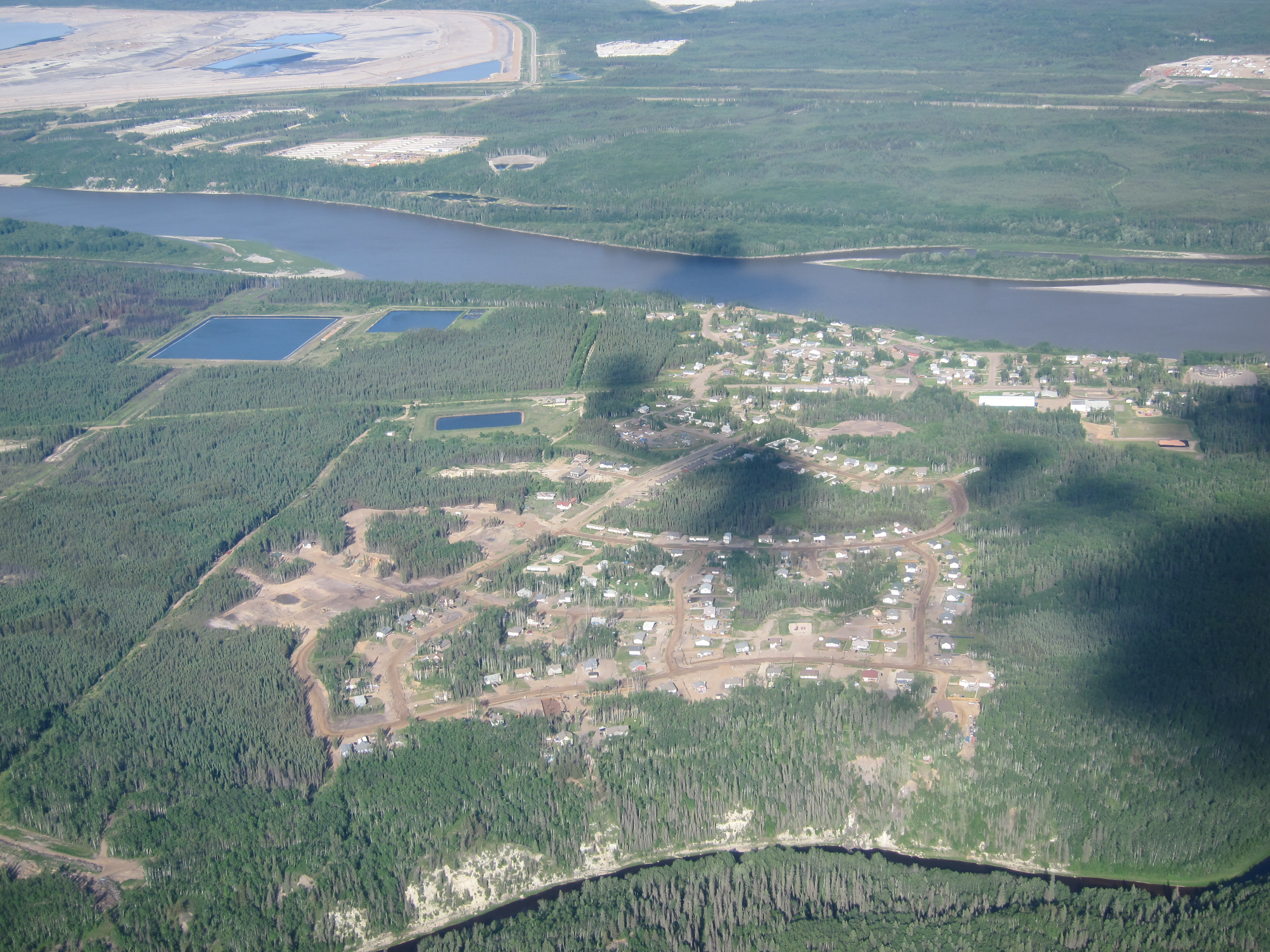
- Aerial view of Fort McKay

- Location of Fort McKay in Alberta
- Coordinates: 57°10′52″N 111°35′59″W
- Country: Canada
- Province: Alberta
- Census division: No. 16
- Specialized municipality: RM of Wood Buffalo
- Established: c. 1870

Government
  - Mayor: Sandy Bowman
  - Governing body: Wood Buffalo Municipal Council: Mike Allen; Ty Brandt; Lance Bussieres; Luana Bussieres; Don Scott; Jennifer Vardy; Kendrick Cardinal; Greg "Cowboy" Marcel; Stu Wigle; Kyle Vandecasteyen

Area
  - Total: 9.53 km^{2} (3.68 sq mi)
- Elevation: 260 m (850 ft)

Population (2016)
  - Total: 742
  - Density: 77.9/km^{2} (202/sq mi)
- Time zone: UTC−06:00 (Alberta Time)
- Postal code span: T0P
- Area codes: 780, 587, 825
- Highways: Highway 63
- Waterways: Athabasca River
- Website: RM of Wood Buffalo

Fort McKay (/məˈkaɪ/ mə-KY) or Fort MacKay is a community in northeast Alberta, Canada, located at the confluence of the Athabasca and MacKay rivers. It is approximately 54 km (34 mi) north of Fort McMurray via Highway 63 and Fort McKay Road. The community has an elevation of 260 m (850 ft).

The majority of the community is an Indian settlement of the Fort McKay First Nation (FMFN). The smaller portion of the community, known as Fort MacKay before 2018, is located adjacent to the FMFN lands to the south within the Regional Municipality (RM) of Wood Buffalo. The portion of the community within the RM of Wood Buffalo is designated as a hamlet.

== History ==
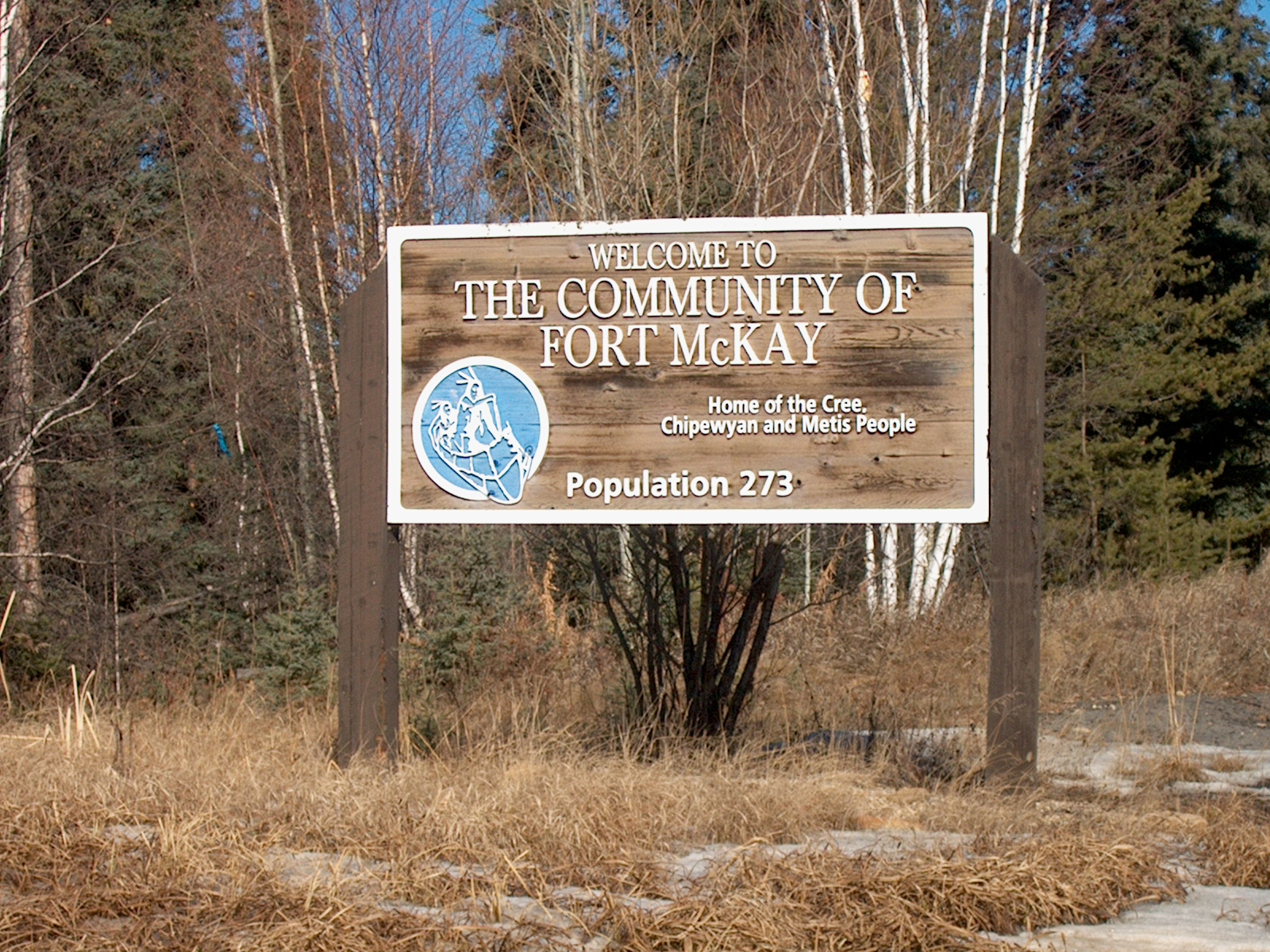
Fort McKay First Nation's welcome sign for the community

Around 1870, the Hudson's Bay Company founded a post called Old Red River House at the confluence of the Red (now called the MacKay River) and Athabasca rivers. It was also known as the Little Red River post, although another post at the confluence of Little Red River (now the Mikkwa River) and Peace River also went by the same name. The community was renamed in 1912 after Dr. William Morrison MacKay, the first president of the Northern Alberta Medical Association. The community's name is spelled Fort McKay by the Fort McKay First Nation. In August 2012, the Fort McKay Métis Community requested the RM of Wood Buffalo to change the name of the hamlet to Fort McKay. The change was recognized by the RM on January 22, 2018.

2016 wildfire

Fort McKay hosted 5000 evacuees from the 2016 Fort McMurray Wildfire but the hamlet itself was put under an evacuation notice due to the northward advance of the flames toward the community.

== Geography ==
Climate

Fort McKay has a subarctic climate (Köppen climate classification Dfc). and falls into the NRC Plant Hardiness Zone 3a. Summers are mild and short, and winters can be long and cold.

== Demographics ==
Population history of Fort MacKay Indian settlement
Year	Pop.	±%
1991	256	—
1996	347	+35.5%
2001	437	+25.9%
2006	521	+19.2%
2011	562	+7.9%
2016	742	+32.0%
Sources: Statistics Canada, 1991–2016 censuses

Settlement

In the 2016 Census of Population conducted by Statistics Canada, the Fort McKay settlement recorded a population of 742 living in 250 of its 303 total private dwellings, a 32% change from its 2011 population of 562. With a land area of 9.53 km^{2} (3.68 sq mi), it had a population density of 77.9/km^{2} (201.7/sq mi) in 2016.

In the 2011 Census, the Fort McKay settlement had a population of 562 living in 201 of its 235 total dwellings, a 7.9% change from its 2006 population of 521. With a land area of 8.17 km^{2} (3.15 sq mi), it had a population density of 68.79/km^{2} (178.16/sq mi) in 2011.

Hamlet

The population of the hamlet portion of Fort McKay according to the 2018 municipal census conducted by the Regional Municipality of Wood Buffalo is 59, an increase from its 2015 municipal census population count of 51.

== Economy ==
The economy is centred on the development of the Athabasca oil sands to the immediate south and north. Motorists travelling north on Highway 63 pass through oil sands developments en route to the community.

== Government ==
The community is located in the federal riding of Fort McMurray—Cold Lake.

Fort McKay, Alberta

== Infrastructure ==
The community is located 6 km (3.7 mi) north of Highway 63 via Fort McKay Road, and is served by air at the Fort MacKay/Horizon Airport.

== See also ==
- List of communities in Alberta
- List of hamlets in Alberta
