= Westwood Community High School =

Coordinates: 56.7284°N 111.4520°W

- Westwood Community High School

Location
- 221 Tundra Drive; Fort McMurray, Alberta; Canada

Information
- Type: Public
- School district: Fort McMurray Public School Division
- Grades: 7–12

Westwood Community High School is a Canadian public senior high school located in Fort McMurray, Alberta and is part of the Fort McMurray Public School District. The school is situated in the community of Thickwood and, as of the 2025–26 school year, had an enrollment of approximately 1100 students in grades 7 through 12. It is the only school in Fort McMurray to offer Advanced Placement courses, with grade 11 and 12 students writing AP exams.

== Academics ==
Westwood Community High School has consistently ranked among the higher-rated secondary schools in Alberta in the Fraser Institute's Report Card on Alberta's High Schools.

Westwood Community High School students have received four Schulich Leader Scholarships, awarded to Linda Guo (2016), Saptarshi Bhattacherya (2021), Manorama Joshi (2022), and Siddhi Singh (2026).

Westwood Community High School students have received five TD Scholarships for Community Leadership, awarded to Yuhan (Angela) Wang (2017), Krish Shah (2021), Irene Olayinka (2022), Haleema Malik (2025), and Ansh Ramani (2026).

Other notable Westwood recipients of nationally competitive scholarships include Dhruv Patel, who received a Loran Scholarship (2018), and Ansh Ramani, who received a Terry Fox Humanitarian Award (2026).

Other recipients of provincial honours include Precious Majekodunmi, who received the Queen Elizabeth II Golden Jubilee Citizenship Award (2022), Diya Laha, who received the Queen Elizabeth II Platinum Jubilee Citizenship Award (2024), and Nishka Rai, who received the Queen Elizabeth II Platinum Jubilee Citizenship Award (2026).

== Advanced Placement ==
The Advanced Placement (AP) courses currently offered at the school include Calculus AB, Biology, Chemistry, Physics 1, Physics 2, English Literature and Composition, English Language and Composition. All AP courses are authorized through the College Board's AP Course Audit program, which verifies that each course meets the curricular and resource requirements established for Advanced Placement courses.

== Programs ==
Westwood Community High School offers competitive robotics through the VEX Robotics Competition. In 2025, Team Rocket (221X) qualified for the VEX Robotics World Championship after receiving the Excellence Award at the Alberta VEX Robotics Championship.

Westwood Community High School students have represented the Wood Buffalo region at the Canada-Wide Science Fair. In 2024, students earned medals, special awards and scholarships at the national competition.

== Facilities ==
The current Westwood Community High School facility opened in 1986. It includes a central interior atrium with mature indoor trees beneath a large skylight.

In 2025, the Government of Alberta approved the design phase for a replacement of Westwood Community High School. The new Grade 7–12 school is planned to accommodate 1,215 students and is scheduled for completion in 2029. The replacement school will be constructed on the athletic field west of the existing building, allowing the current school to remain in operation during construction. The new facility will include classrooms approximately 20–30% larger than those in the existing school, will be designed to accommodate future modular classroom expansion, and will preserve green space through a multi-storey design.

== Fine and performing arts ==
Westwood Community High School offers fine and performing arts programming, including music, visual arts and drama. The school is recognized by the Fort McMurray Public School Division for its dedication to the arts, and its music program includes guitar class, choir and instrumental performance opportunities.

== Athletics ==
The school has multiple sports teams, including basketball, Dene hand games, soccer, football, volleyball, badminton and golf. All athletic teams participate in the Alberta Schools Athletic Association.

== See also ==
- Fort McMurray Public School District
- Fort McMurray
- Regional Municipality of Wood Buffalo
- List of high schools in Alberta
