= Fort McKay First Nation =

First Nations government in Alberta, Canada

- Band No. 467
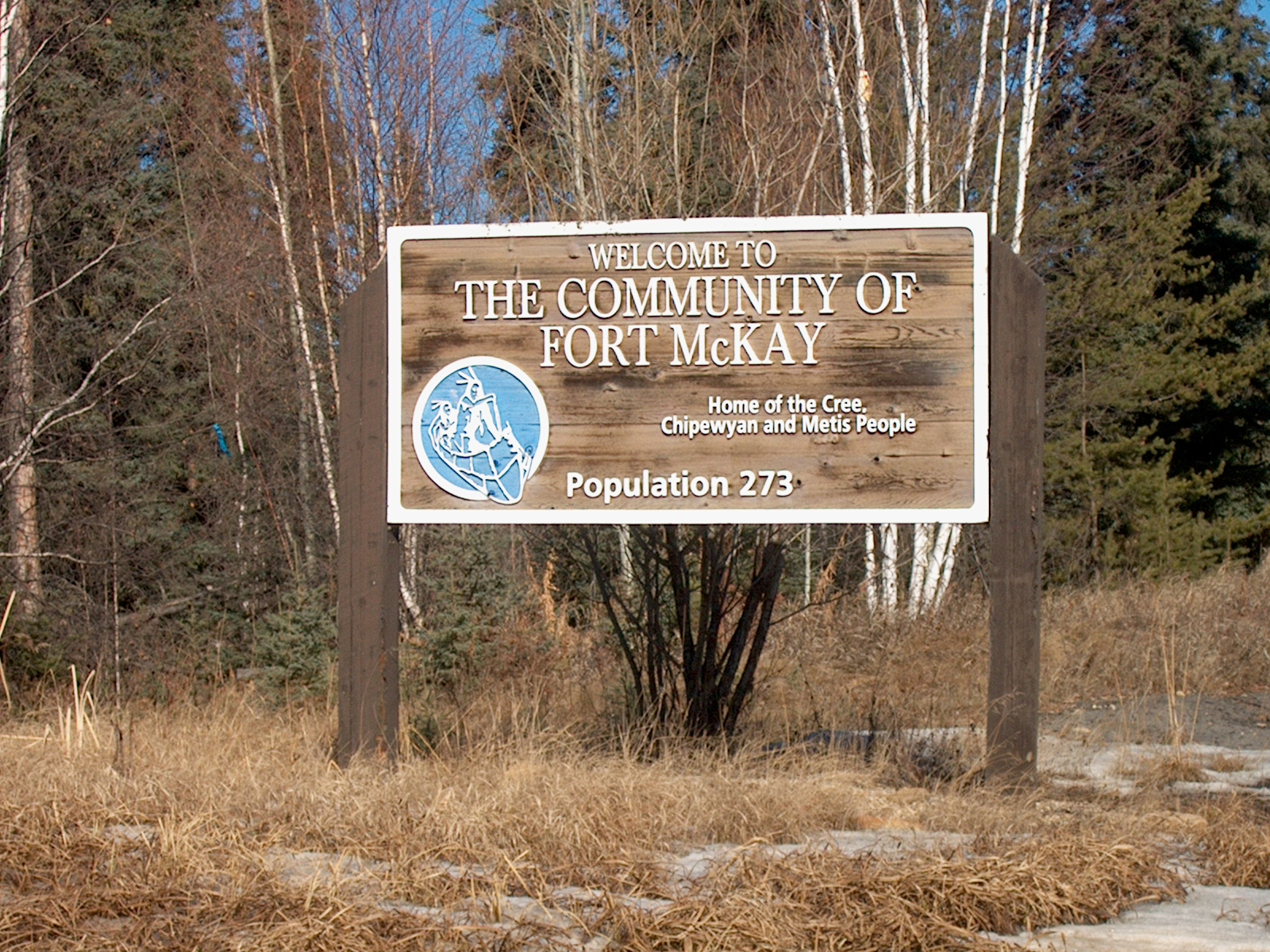
- People: Dene; Cree; Métis
- Treaty: Treaty 8
- Headquarters: Fort McKay
- Province: Alberta

Land
- Other reserves: Fort McKay 174; Fort McKay 174C; Fort McKay 174D; Namur Lake 174B; Namur River 174A
- Land area: 148.86 km^{2} (57.48 sq mi)

Population (2019)
- On reserve: 421
- On other land: 4
- Off reserve: 468
- Total population: 893

Government
- Chief: Raymond Powder

Tribal Council
- Athabasca Tribal Council

Website
- fortmckay.com

The Fort McKay First Nation (FMFN) is a First Nations government in northeast Alberta, Canada comprising five Indian reserves – Fort McKay 174, Fort McKay 174C, Fort McKay 174D, Namur Lake 174B and Namur River 174A. The FMFN, signed to Treaty 8, is affiliated with the Athabasca Tribal Council and its members are of Cree, Métis, and Dene heritage. The FMFN's traditional lands include portions of the Athabasca oil sands.

== History ==
Fur trade route: Fort McKay is located west of Methye Portage on the Athabasca River.

The Cree expanded steadily westward from the Hudson-James Bay country. Although the arrival of the Cree in the Lac la Biche region, is unknown, archaeological evidence in the form of pre-contact pottery indicates that the Cree were in this region in the 1500s.

=== The Historic Voyageur Highway ===
The traditional land of the Fort McKay First Nation was on the historical voyageur route that linked the rich Athabaskan region to Hudson Bay. David Thompson and George Simpson used the fur-trade route via the Beaver River from the main Methye Portage route that reached the Athabasca River.

The Cree, one of the "largest tribes in Canada" were referred to by the early explorers and fur traders as Kristineaux, Kinisteneaux, Kiliston, Kree, Cris and various other names such as Nahathaway. (Note: This is the full-text diary of David Thompson which includes numerous references to the Nahathaway in general and to the First Nations of the Lac la Biche region in particular. He describes their belief in life after death and consequences on the human soul for crimes and misdeeds.) Cree territory extended west from the Hudson-James Bay region to the foot of the Rocky Mountains, and in Alberta, between the north banks of the north Saskatchewan River to Fort Chipewyan. This includes the Beaver, Athabaska and Peace River basins. It is noted in the department of Indian Affairs Annual Reports that Pee-ay-sis of the Lac La Biche band as far north as Great Slave Lake."

Alexander Mackenzie who travelled from Montreal to the Arctic Ocean via the Methy Portage (see map) provided a detailed account of the Kinisteneaux (Cree) in 1789.

=== Tribal Council ===
The Athabasca Tribal Council, (Note: A Tribal Council, is "an association of Native American bands in the United States or First Nations governments in Canada, or (2) the governing body for certain tribes within the United States or elsewhere (since ancient times). They are generally formed along regional, ethnic or linguistic lines.") represents the interests of Fort McKay First Nation, Athabasca Chipewyan First Nation, Chipewyan Prairie First Nation, Fort McMurray No. 468 First Nation and Mikisew Cree First Nation. These five First Nations of North Eastern Alberta include more than 5,000 Cree and Dene people.

=== Treaty 8 ===
Treaty 8 was an agreement signed on June 21, 1899, between Queen Victoria and various First Nations of the Lesser Slave Lake area. The Treaty was signed just south of present-day Grouard, Alberta. The land covered by Treaty 8, 840,000 square kilometres (84,000,000 ha) is larger than France and includes northern Alberta, northeastern British Columbia, northwestern Saskatchewan and a southernmost portion of the Northwest Territories. Adhesions to this agreement were signed that same year on July 1 at Peace River Landing, July 6 at Dunvegan, July 8 at Fort Vermilion, July 13 at Fort Chipewyan, July 17 at Smith's Landing, July 25 and 27 at Fond du Lac, August 4 at Fort McMurray, and August 14 at Wabasca Lake. Further Adhesions were in 1900 on May 13 at Fort St. John, June 8 at Lesser Slave Lake, June 23 at Fort Vermilion and July 25 at Fort Resolution.

== Traditional land use ==
"Hunting and trapping is an integral part of the traditional livelihoods for many Fort McKay residents. Therefore, natural ecosystems and wildlife populations preservation is an important component to help maintain a healthy community." The FMFN expressed concerns about cumulative effects and requested that regulators implement the recommendations in the Terrestrial Ecosystem Management Framework (TEMF) in order to maintain wildlife populations (Cumulative Environmental Management Association 2008). In a letter to the Alberta Environment and Sustainable Resource Development Regulatory Approvals Center regarding the Teck Resources Limited's (Teck) proposed Frontier Oil Sands Mine Project, on FMFN traditional lands, the FMFN stressed that beaver, moose and wood bison are three of the most important species of great importance to the FMFN. Other key resources indicators (KRI) to consider in assessing the effects on wildlife of oil sands development in their territory, include Black Bear, Fisher, Canada Lynx, Northern Goshawk, Yellow Rail, Short‐eared Owl, Common Nighthawk, Olive‐sided Flycatcher, Canada Warbler, Rusty Blackbird, Waterfowl and Western Toad.

== Environment ==
The "Frontier Mine is a major surface mining project, with a total Project footprint of 24,140 ha and with a 50‐year operational life extending from approximately 2020 to 2070 including final closure and reclamation. Closure activities are proposed to be coordinated with the nearby Shell Pierre River Mine (PRM) project located immediately south."

=== Groundwater ===
FMFN expressed concern about the degradation of the McMurray Basal Water Sands Aquifer (BWS), through high-volume use through the mining process.

"The hydrogeologic sequence is typical of the mineable area west of the Athabasca River and is comprised of the following units from oldest to youngest:

1) the eroded top of the Devonian sequence, which includes the Slave Point and Waterways Formations; and in the RSA the Devonian section includes both aquifers and aquitards; the Waterways underlies the Project in the LSA;

2) the McMurray Formation, which contains bitumen; portions of the lower McMurray are water saturated (i.e., basal water sand); where present, the basal aquifer appears to be non‐saline; there are also water‐bearing lenses of sand within the ore body (Middle McMurray);

3) the Clearwater Formation; (aquitard); composed of shale and siltstone; in places the Wabiskaw D sand of the lower Clearwater also contains bitumen;

4) Quaternary sediments including undifferentiated glacial deposits and buried channels and glacial surficial deposits (contains aquifers and aquitards); and

5) Post‐glacial (Recent or Holocene) fluvial fan deposits containing permeable saturated sand (aquifer)."

— FMFN, 2012, 105

=== Moose Lake 'last wilderness' ===
Moose Lake is a "sacred region" that serves as the community's "key cultural heartland". The community originated in the Moose Lake area, which is located 64 km northwest of Fort McKay, and there are gravesites on their traditional lands there, according to a January 20, 2018 article in The Narwhal. Moose Lake is actually two lakes—Gardiner Lake and Namur Lake. Fort McKay is "surrounded on three sides by oilsands development" with mines coming as "close as four kilometres to the community." Moose Lake is the only remaining place that still has clean air and water that is "good enough to drink right from the lake". Grand Chief Mel Grandjamb of the Fort McKay First Nation said that, "We send hunting camps out there every year. We supply cabins to all our elders who want to go out there." The local Métis community also uses Moose Lake for their "traditional activities".

The band began to negotiate with the province of Alberta in the late 1990s to protect the lake and in 2014, then premier Jim Prentice had endorsed plan to protect the lake. The band had almost come to an agreement with the previous Alberta government in 2018 to create a "10-kilometre buffer".

==== Brion Energy's Dover oil sands SAGD project (Moose Lake) ====
The Dover oil sands SAGD project (Moose Lake) project, operated by Brion Energy, is a joint venture between Calgary-based Athabasca Oil Corporation, with Dover holding 40 per cent, and Chinese oil giant PetroChina, which owns 60 per cent."

The FMFN had delayed the Dover project by requiring "a 20-kilometre no-development buffer zone on part of Brion's oil sands leases that were near the FMFN Moose Lake traditional lands. On 6 August 2013, Alberta Energy Regulator’s (AER) denied the FMFN appeal arguing that the Dover oilsands project using steam-assisted gravity drainage technology (SAGD) development would have little impact on FMNN lands. On October 18, 2013 On Friday, Justice Frans Slatter of the Alberta Court of Appeal gave Fort MacKay First Nation leave to appeal the AER's August 6 approval of the Athabasca Oil Corporation's 250,000-barrel-per-day thermal oilsands project, Dover. The Fort MacKay First Nation's lawyer, Karen Buss, predicted that the new panel might "order the regulator to start its process over with direction to consider treaty rights issues identified by the band."

==== Prosper Petroleum Rigel oil sands SAGD project (Moose Lake) ====
Prosper Petroleum, which is a junior oil sands company established in 2007 by veterans oilsands operators—BlackRock Ventures and Koch Exploration Canada, had obtained leases from Koch Oil Sands Operating. Prosper Petroleum's Rigel Oil Sands Project is a steam-assisted gravity drainage technology (SAGD) development that is located just three kilometres off the shore of Namur Lake. Prosper Petroleum started drilling evaluation wells near Moose Lake in 2013.

In June 2018, Alberta's energy regulator approved a $440-million, 10,000-barrel-a-day Oil Sands Project. The band launched an appeal of the approval with the Alberta Court of Appeal.

== Archaeological significance ==
Fort McKay First Nation's traditional territory contains one of the densest concentrations of precontact archaeological sites in northern Alberta, largely due to local deposits of Beaver River Sandstone (BRS), a fine-grained silicified orthoquartzite prized for flintknapping.

Three major sites within this territory are designated Provincial Historic Resources: the Beaver River Quarry (Borden number HgOv-29), the Quarry of the Ancestors (a complex of approximately 80 sites in the Muskeg River Valley), and the Cree Burn Lake Archaeological Site.

Cree Burn Lake, known as Ena Kerin Ka (Burnt Cree Lake) to Cree and Métis residents of Fort McKay and as Isadore's Lake to Chipewyan residents, is a roughly 445-acre site on the east side of the Athabasca River containing dense concentrations of stone artifacts, cultural diagnostic tools, and stratified cultural deposits associated with organic horizons; it was designated a Provincial Historic Resource on August 10, 1999. The surrounding area was historically a traditional resource-procurement ground for fish, waterfowl, fur-bearers, deer, and moose, as well as medicinal plants and berries, and was seasonally frequented by wood bison until overhunting drove them to near-extinction in the region by the mid-19th century.

More than 1,000 archaeological sites have been recorded across the region since the 1970s, largely identified through historic resource impact assessments (HRIAs) conducted ahead of oil sands development. Diagnostic stone tools recovered from these sites indicate the region was used by precontact peoples as early as 9,800 years ago.

== See also ==
- The Canadian Crown and Aboriginal peoples
