= Beaver River sandstone =

Beaver River sandstone (also known as Beaver River Silicified Sandstone, Beaver Creek Quartzite, Muskeg Valley Silicified Limestone, or Muskeg Valley Microquartz) is a rock material locally found in northern Alberta, Canada, that was extensively used by First Nations people in prehistoric times to make tools with a sharp edge.

Many projectile points and other tools made from Beaver River sandstone have been found at archaeological sites in the Oil Sands region of Alberta. As of 2016, artifacts made from the material had been reported at nearly 1,000 archaeological sites across the province.

== Description ==
Technically classified as a silicified orthoquartzite, Beaver River sandstone ranges in colour from light beige to dark grey and in texture from fine- to coarse-grained, with most pieces showing internal irregularities. Finer-grained, flaw-free pieces break in a predictable fashion, making them well suited to flintknapping, while coarser material is less consistent. Some artifacts show reddish discolouration thought to result from intentional heat treatment, a process used to improve the stone's flaking qualities.

Portable X-ray fluorescence analysis can geochemically distinguish Beaver River sandstone from macroscopically similar materials, such as Tongue River Silicified Sediment, which outcrops in Montana and appears in artifact assemblages in southern Alberta.

== Formation ==
The material formed along the margins of an ancient river valley when a shift in groundwater chemistry, driven by sulphate-saturated brine seeps and microbially induced redox reactions, triggered silica cementation in sand beds, producing the Beaver River silcrete.

== Sources ==
Two major quarry complexes have been identified as primary sources of Beaver River sandstone, both located north of Fort McMurray and both designated Provincial Historic Resources.

=== Beaver River Quarry ===
The Beaver River Quarry (Borden number HgOv-29) sits on 49 hectares of land near the confluence of Beaver Creek and the Athabasca River. It was the first identified source of the material and remains rich in evidence of prehistoric quarrying and tool manufacture.

=== Quarry of the Ancestors ===
The Quarry of the Ancestors is a roughly 199-hectare complex of about 80 sites in the Muskeg River Valley. Although coarse-grained Beaver River sandstone outcrops had been known since the 1980s, the source of the finer-grained material dominating regional artifact assemblages remained unidentified until 2003, when archaeologist Nancy Saxberg located it during a historic resource impact assessment ahead of proposed industrial development.

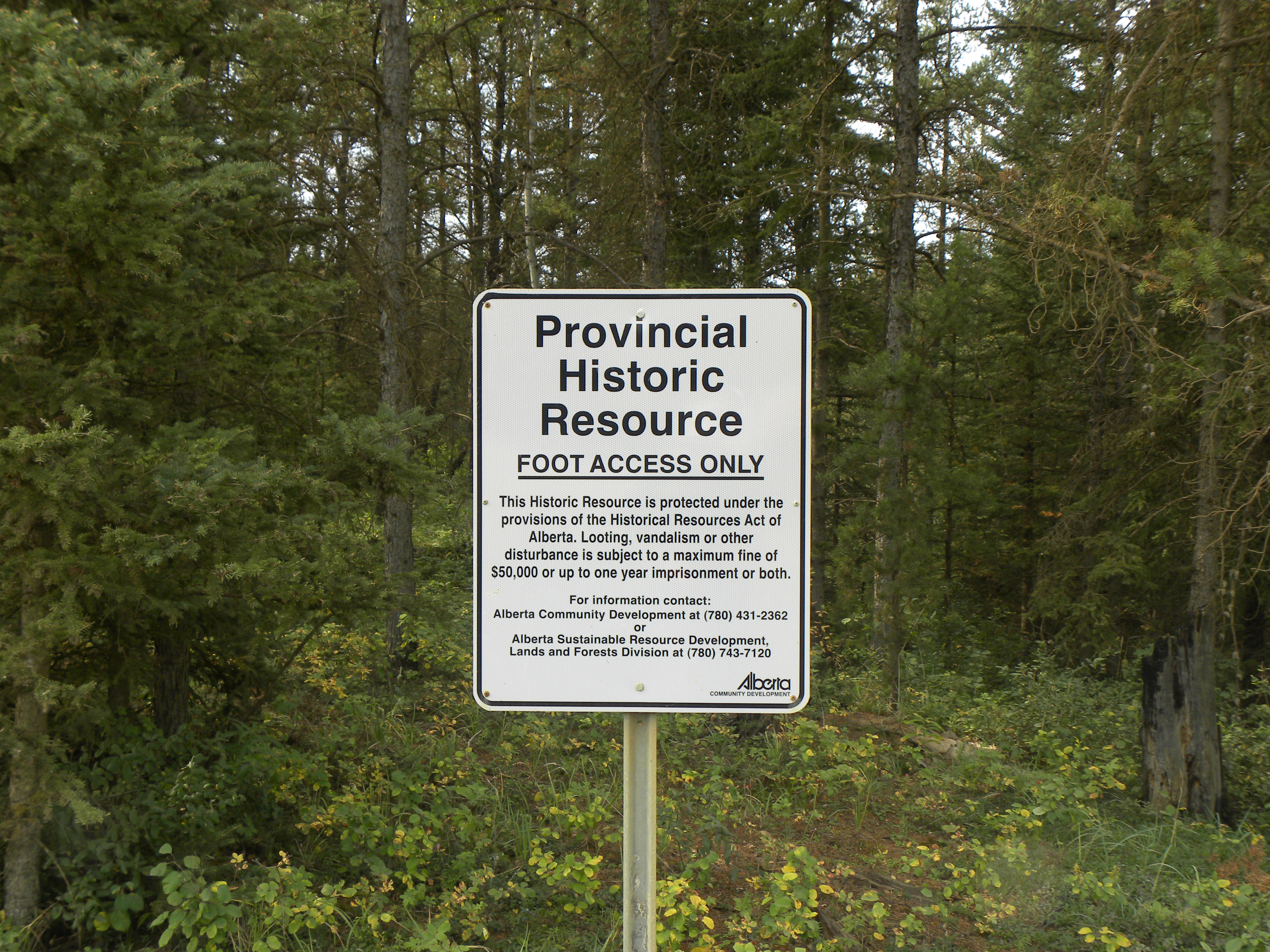
Quarry of the Ancestors, September 2009

== Archaeological significance ==
Diagnostic stone tools recovered from sites in the region indicate Beaver River sandstone was in heavy use from roughly 9,800 to 1,000 years ago. The material was also widely traded or carried well beyond its source: artifacts identified as Beaver River sandstone have been recovered as far afield as the Birch Mountains, the Clearwater River, La Loche in northwestern Saskatchewan, the Slave River, Christina Lake, Cold Lake, Grande Prairie, and sites near Head-Smashed-In Buffalo Jump and Fort Macleod in southern Alberta. This wide distribution has made the material a useful indicator of precontact trade networks and patterns of human mobility across northern and central Alberta.

== See also ==
- Quarry of the Ancestors
- Fort McKay First Nation
