= 2022 Fort McMurray-Lac La Biche provincial by-election =

← 2019	March 15, 2022	2023 →

Seat of Fort McMurray-Lac La Biche
- Registered: 24,048
- Turnout: 24.27% (▼33.98 pp)
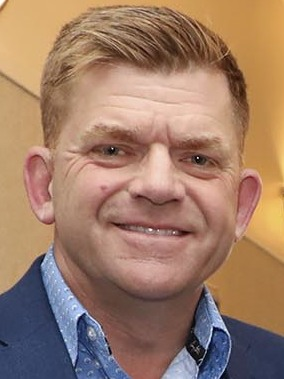

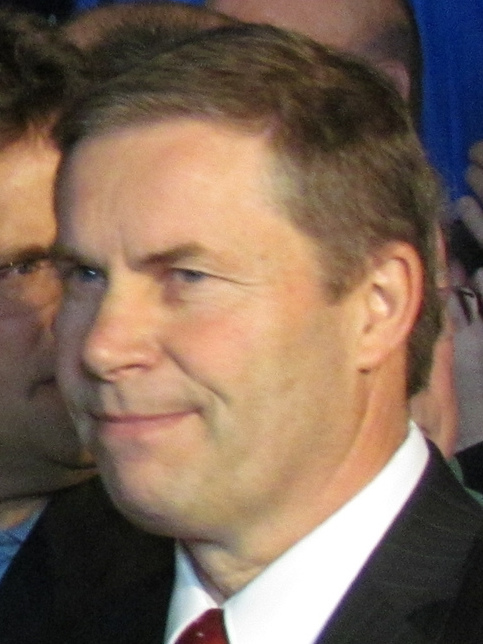
	First party	Second party	Third party
		NDP
Candidate	Brian Jean	Ariana Mancini	Paul Hinman
Party	United Conservative	New Democratic	Wildrose Independence
Popular vote	3,714	1,081	628
Percentage	63.6%	18.5%	10.8%
Swing	▼2.73 pp	▼6.01 pp	N/A
MLA before election
Laila Goodridge
United Conservative
Elected MLA
Brian Jean
United Conservative

The 2022 Fort McMurray-Lac La Biche by-election took place on March 15, 2022. The seat was left vacant on August 15, 2021, when incumbent MLA Laila Goodridge resigned to run in that year's federal election as the Conservative candidate in the riding of Fort McMurray—Cold Lake.

The by-election was won by former MLA Brian Jean of the United Conservative Party, who previously led the Wildrose Party before its merger with the Progressive Conservative Association of Alberta in 2017.

== Background ==
=== Riding profile ===
The district is located in northeastern Alberta and is named for its main communities: it includes all of Lac La Biche County and the southern half of Fort McMurray (Regional Municipality of Wood Buffalo). It also contains two reserves belonging to the Fort McMurray First Nation (Clearwater 175 and Gregoire Lake 176), all three reserves of the Chipewyan Prairie First Nation, the Heart Lake First Nation (on Heart Lake 167), the main reserve of the Beaver Lake Cree Nation, Beaver Lake 131, and one of the Saddle Lake Cree Nation's reserves (Whitefish Lake 128). Major transportation routes include Alberta Highways 36 (Veterans Memorial Highway), 55 (Northern Woods and Water Route), 63, and 881.

=== Resignation of Laila Goodridge ===
On August 14, 2021, incumbent Conservative MP for Fort McMurray—Cold Lake David Yurdiga decided not to seek re-election and communicated his decision to party leader Erin O'Toole the same day. The announcement was made public on August 15, with a party spokesman citing health concerns for his decision.

The same day, Lalia Goodridge resigned her seat in the Legislative Assembly and was chosen by the Conservative Party as Yurdiga's replacement. Her appointment as candidate was criticized by party's local electoral district association in a Facebook post on August 20, stating the association was preparing to hold a nominating contest and was "blindsided" by the federal party's appointment.

== Results ==
Brian Jean won the by-election in a landslide, retaining the seat for the United Conservative Party.

Alberta provincial by-election, 15 March 2022: Fort McMurray-Lac La Biche
Party	Candidate	Votes	%	±%
United Conservative	Brian Jean	3,717	63.64	-2.69
New Democratic	Ariana Mancini	1,081	18.51	-6.01
Wildrose Independence	Paul Hinman	628	10.75	–
Liberal	Abdulhakim Hussein	211	3.61	–
Alberta Party	Michelle Landsiedel	98	1.68	-4.10
Independent	Brian Deheer	57	0.98	–0.58
Alberta Advantage Party	Marilyn Burns	25	0.43	–
Alberta Independence	Steven Mellott	24	0.41	-1.42
Total valid votes		5,841	99.39	
Total rejected ballots		36	0.61	-0.02
Turnout		5,877	23.99	-34.26
Eligible voters		24,501		
United Conservative hold		Swing		+1.66
