= Fort McMurray-Lac La Biche =

Provincial electoral district in Alberta, Canada

Alberta electoral district
- Fort McMurray-Lac La Biche within Alberta (2017 boundaries)

Provincial electoral district
- Legislature: Legislative Assembly of Alberta
MLA
Brian Jean
United Conservative
- District created: 2017
- First contested: 2019
- Last contested: 2023

Demographics
- Population (2016): 44,166
- Area (km²): 32,317
- Pop. density (per km²): 1.4
- Census division(s): Division No. 12, Division No. 13, Division No. 16
- Census subdivision(s): Athabasca County, Beaver Lake 131, Gregoire Lake 176, Heart Lake 167, Janvier 194, Lac la Biche County, Smoky Lake County, White Fish Lake 128, Wood Buffalo

Fort McMurray-Lac La Biche is a current provincial electoral district in Alberta, Canada. The district will be one of 87 districts mandated to return a single member (MLA) to the Legislative Assembly of Alberta using the first past the post method of voting. It was contested for the first time in the 2019 Alberta election.

== Geography ==
The district is located in northeastern Alberta and is named for its main communities: it includes all of Lac La Biche County and the southern half of Fort McMurray (Regional Municipality of Wood Buffalo). It also contains two reserves belonging to the Fort McMurray First Nation (Clearwater 175 and Gregoire Lake 176), all three reserves of the Chipewyan Prairie First Nation, the Heart Lake First Nation (on Heart Lake 167), the main reserve of the Beaver Lake Cree Nation, Beaver Lake 131, and one of the Saddle Lake Cree Nation's reserves (Whitefish Lake 128). Major transportation routes include Alberta Highways 36 (Veterans Memorial Highway), 55 (Northern Woods and Water Route), 63, and 881.

== History ==
Members of the Legislative Assembly for Fort McMurray-Lac La Biche
Assembly	Years	Member	Party
Riding created from Lac La Biche-St. Paul-Two Hills, Fort McMurray-Conklin, Fort McMurray-Wood Buffalo and Athabasca-Sturgeon-Redwater
30th	2019–2021	Laila Goodridge	United Conservative
30th	2022–Present	Brian Jean	United Conservative

The district was created in 2017 when the Electoral Boundaries Commission recommended abolishing Lac La Biche-St. Paul-Two Hills and extending the border of Fort McMurray-Conklin southward, renaming it in the process. The new district differs from the historical Lac La Biche-McMurray district in that it does not contain the whole of Fort McMurray. Its northern boundary is formed by the Athabasca River, Thickwood Boulevard within Fort McMurray, and the Clearwater River.

In 2019, the district elected United Conservative MLA Laila Goodridge who had previously been elected to Fort McMurray-Conklin in the July 12, 2018 by-election following the resignation of Brian Jean on March 5, 2018. Goodridge had previously stood as a Wildrose candidate for Grande Prairie-Wapiti in the 2015 Alberta general election, placing third behind PC Wayne Drysdale and NDP candidate Mary Dahr. The 2019 election was in many ways a rematch of the 2018 by-election with Goodridge once again defeating Regional Municipality of Wood Buffalo councillor and NDP candidate Jane Stroud, this time by 6,231 votes.

In August 2021 Goodridge resigned as MLA to successfully run as the Conservative Party's MP candidate in Fort McMurray—Cold Lake MP in the 2021 Canadian federal election. A provincial by-election was then held in March 2022, making Brian Jean the new MLA.

== Electoral results ==
=== 2023 ===
2023 Alberta general election
Party	Candidate	Votes	%	±%
United Conservative	Brian Jean	7,692	73.57	+9.93
New Democratic	Calan William Simeon Hobbs	2,561	24.50	+5.99
Independent	Kevin Johnston	202	1.93	–
Total		10,455	99.33	–
Rejected and declined		70	0.67	
Turnout		10,525	42.90	
Eligible voters		24,536		
United Conservative hold		Swing		+3.63
Source(s) Source: Elections Alberta

=== 2022 by-election ===
Alberta provincial by-election, 15 March 2022
Party	Candidate	Votes	%	±%
United Conservative	Brian Jean	3,717	63.64	-2.69
New Democratic	Ariana Mancini	1,081	18.51	-6.01
Wildrose Independence	Paul Hinman	628	10.75	–
Liberal	Abdulhakim Hussein	211	3.61	–
Alberta Party	Michelle Landsiedel	98	1.68	-4.10
Independent	Brian Deheer	57	0.98	–0.58
Alberta Advantage Party	Marilyn Burns	25	0.43	–
Alberta Independence	Steven Mellott	24	0.41	-1.42
Total valid votes		5,841	99.39	
Total rejected ballots		36	0.61	-0.02
Turnout		5,877	23.99	-34.26
Eligible voters		24,501		
United Conservative hold		Swing		+1.66

=== 2019 ===
2019 Alberta general election
Party	Candidate	Votes	%	±%
United Conservative	Laila Goodridge	9,836	66.33	+2.63
New Democratic	Jane Stroud	3,635	24.51	-8.79
Alberta Party	Jeff Fafard	857	5.78	–
Alberta Independence	Mark Grinder	271	1.83	–
Green	Brian Deheer	230	1.55	+0.45
Total		14,829	99.36	–
Rejected, spoiled and declined		95	0.64	–
Eligible electors / turnout		25,622	58.25	–
United Conservative notional hold		Swing		5.73
Source(s) Source: "60 - Fort Mcmurray-Lac La Biche, 2019 Alberta general election". officialresults.elections.ab.ca. Elections Alberta. Alberta. Chief Electoral Officer (2019). 2019 General Election. A Report of the Chief Electoral Officer. Volume II (PDF) (Report). Vol. 2. Edmonton, Alta.: Elections Alberta. pp. 269–274. ISBN 978-1-988620-12-1. Change is based on re-distributed results from the 2015 Alberta general election.

=== 2015 ===
Redistributed results, 2015 Alberta election
Party	Votes	%
Wildrose	4,910	42.59%
New Democratic	3,833	33.25%
Progressive Conservative	2,433	21.10%
Others	353	3.06%

== See also ==
- List of Alberta provincial electoral districts
- Canadian provincial electoral districts
