= Fort McMurray-Conklin =

Defunct provincial electoral district in Alberta, Canada

Coordinates: 56°43′35″N 111°22′49″W

Alberta electoral district
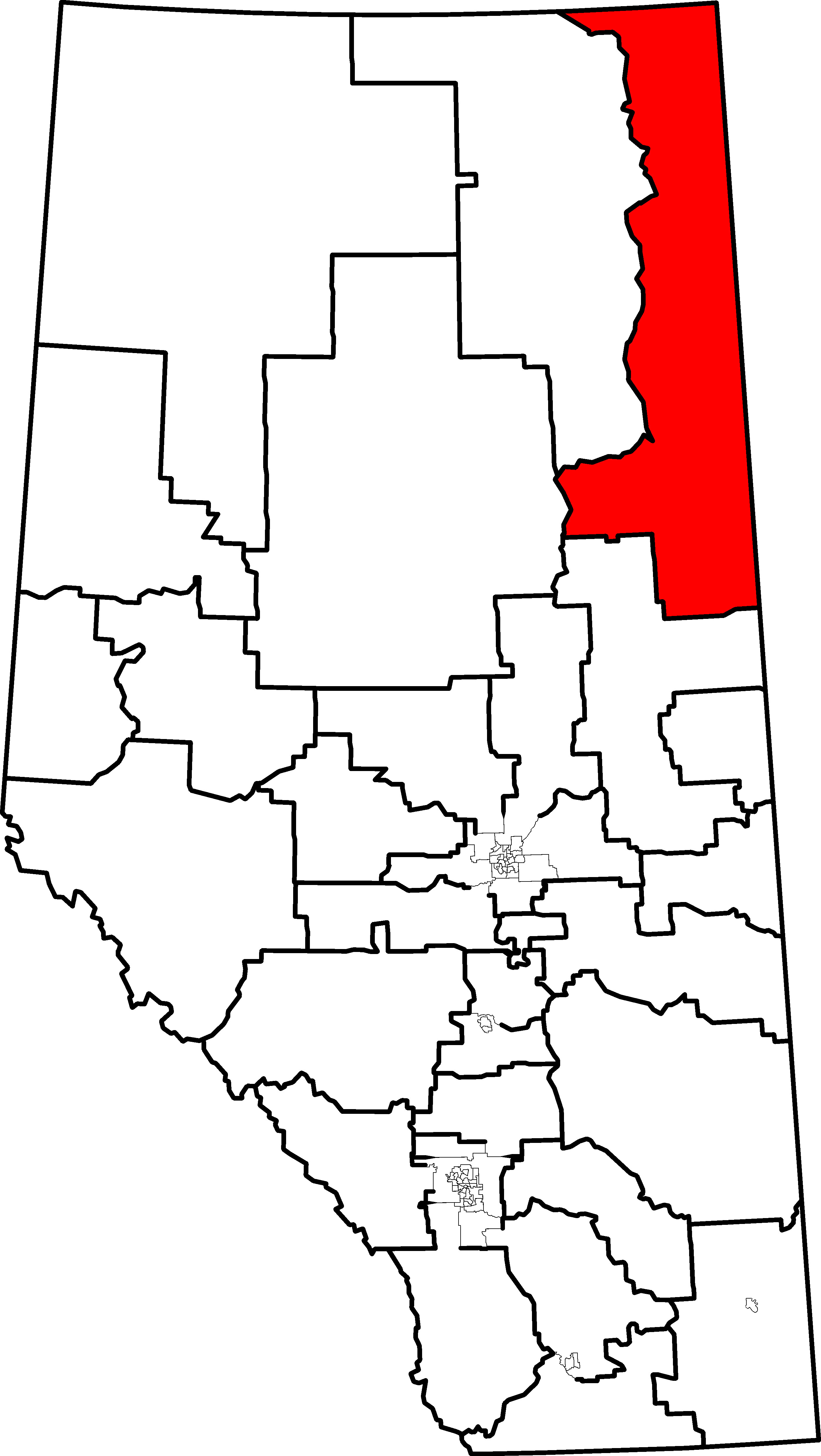
- 2010 boundaries

Defunct provincial electoral district
- Legislature: Legislative Assembly of Alberta
- District created: 2010
- District abolished: 2019
- First contested: 2012
- Last contested: 2015

Demographics
- Census division(s): Division No. 12, Division No. 16
- Census subdivision(s): Allison Bay 219, Chipewyan 201A, Dog Head 218, Fort Mackay, Gregoire Lake 176, Gregoire Lake 176A, Improvement District No. 349, Janvier 194, Lac la Biche County, Old Fort 217, Thabacha Náre 196A, Thebathi 196, Wood Buffalo

Fort McMurray-Conklin was a provincial electoral district in Alberta, Canada, mandated to return a single member to the Legislative Assembly of Alberta using first-past-the-post balloting from 2012 to 2019.

== History ==
The electoral district was created in the 2010 Alberta boundary re-distribution. It was created from the electoral district of Fort McMurray-Wood Buffalo which was split in half to accommodate population growth which has occurred in the region over the past decade due to exploitation and development of the oil sands.

=== Representation history ===
| Assembly | Years | Member | Party |
|---|---|---|---|
See Fort McMurray-Wood Buffalo 2004-2012
| 28th | 2012–2015 | Don Scott | Progressive Conservative |
| 29th | 2015–2017 | Brian Jean | Wildrose |
| 29th | 2017–2018 | Brian Jean | United Conservative |
| 29th | 2018–2019 | Laila Goodridge | United Conservative |
Riding abolished into Fort McMurray-Lac La Biche, Fort McMurray-Wood Buffalo and Bonnyville-Cold Lake-St. Paul

The riding's first representative was Progressive Conservative Don Scott, who served one term until defeated by Wildrose leader Brian Jean. Jean subsequently changed his affiliation to United Conservative when the two parties merged. After an unsuccessful run for the party's leadership, he decided to retire from politics, vacating the seat in early 2018. The resulting by-election was won easily by Jean's former staffer and previous Grande Prairie-Wapiti candidate Laila Goodridge for the United Conservatives.

=== Boundary history ===
The district's boundaries were not altered during its brief existence. In the redistribution of 2017, the riding was abolished and will be replaced with Fort McMurray-Lac La Biche for the 2019 Alberta general election.

58 Fort McMurray-Conklin 2010 boundaries
Bordering districts
| North | East | West | South |
|---|---|---|---|
| Northwest Territories boundary | Saskatchewan boundary | Fort McMurray-Wood Buffalo and Lesser Slave Lake | Lac La Biche-St. Paul-Two Hills |
Note: Boundary descriptions were not used in the 2010 redistribution

== Election results ==
=== Graphical summary ===
2012 general election
| 7.9% | 3.0% | 49.0% | 40.1% |
| NDP | Lib | Progressive Conservative | Wildrose |

2015 general election
| 30.8% | 3.0% | 22.3% | 43.9% |
| NDP | Lib | Progressive Conservative | Wildrose |

2018 by-election
| 28.6% | | 67.0% |
| NDP | A | United Conservative |

=== 2012 ===
2012 Alberta general election
| Party | Candidate | Votes | % |
|---|---|---|---|
| Progressive Conservative | Don Scott | 2,588 | 48.95 |
| Wildrose | Doug Faulkner | 2,123 | 40.16 |
| New Democratic | Paul Pomerleau | 419 | 7.93 |
| Liberal | Ted Remenda | 157 | 2.97 |
| Total valid votes | | 5,287 | 99.17 |
| Rejected, spoiled and declined | | 44 | 0.83 |
| Turnout | | 5,331 | 36.30 |
| Eligible electors | | 14,686 | |
| Progressive Conservative pickup new district. | | | |
Source(s) Elections Alberta. "Election Results - Fort McMurray-Conklin". officialresults.elections.ab.ca/.

=== 2015 ===
2015 Alberta general election
| Party | Candidate | Votes | % | ±% |
|---|---|---|---|---|
| Wildrose | Brian Jean | 2,950 | 43.85 | +3.70 |
| New Democratic | Ariana Mancini | 2,071 | 30.79 | +22.86 |
| Progressive Conservative | Don Scott | 1,502 | 22.33 | −26.62 |
| Liberal | Melinda Hollis | 204 | 3.03 | +0.06 |
| Total valid votes | | 6,727 | 99.10 | – |
| Rejected, spoiled and declined | | 61 | 0.90 | +0.07 |
| Turnout | | 6,788 | 44.45 | +8.15 |
| Eligible electors | | 15,272 | | |
| Wildrose gain from Progressive Conservative | | Swing | | +15.16 |
Source(s) Elections Alberta. "Election Results - Fort McMurray-Conklin".

=== 2018 by-election ===
Alberta provincial by-election, July 12, 2018 Upon the resignation of Brian Jean on March 5, 2018
| Party | Candidate | Votes | % | ±% |
|---|---|---|---|---|
| United Conservative | Laila Goodridge | 2,689 | 67.02 | +0.84 |
| New Democratic | Jane Stroud | 1,149 | 28.64 | -2.15 |
| Alberta Party | Sid Fayed | 103 | 2.57 | – |
| Liberal | Robin Le Fevre | 42 | 1.05 | -1.99 |
| Green | Brian Deheer | 29 | 0.72 | – |
| Total valid votes | | 4,012 | 99.50 | – |
| Rejected, spoiled and declined | | 20 | 0.50 | -0.40 |
| Turnout | | 4,032 | 32.59 | -11.85 |
| Eligible electors | | 12,370 | | |
| United Conservative notional hold | | Swing | | +1.50 |
Source(s) Elections Alberta. "Election results".

^ UCP change is compared to combined Wildrose and Progressive Conservative

== See also ==
- List of Alberta provincial electoral districts
- Canadian provincial electoral districts
- Fort McMurray, an urban service area in the riding
- Conklin, a hamlet in the riding
