= Gregoire Lake 176B =

Coordinates: 56°28′09″N 111°06′51″W

- Indian reserve
- Gregoire Lake Indian Reserve No. 176B
- Location in Alberta
- First Nation: Fort McMurray
- Treaty: 8
- Country: Canada
- Province: Alberta
- Specialized municipality: Wood Buffalo

Area
  - Total: 17 ha (42 acres)
- Time zone: UTC−06:00 (Alberta Time)

Gregoire Lake 176B is an Indian reserve of the Fort McMurray First Nation in Alberta, located within the Regional Municipality of Wood Buffalo.
