= 2017 United Conservative Party leadership election =

Provincial party election in Alberta, Canada

- October 28, 2017
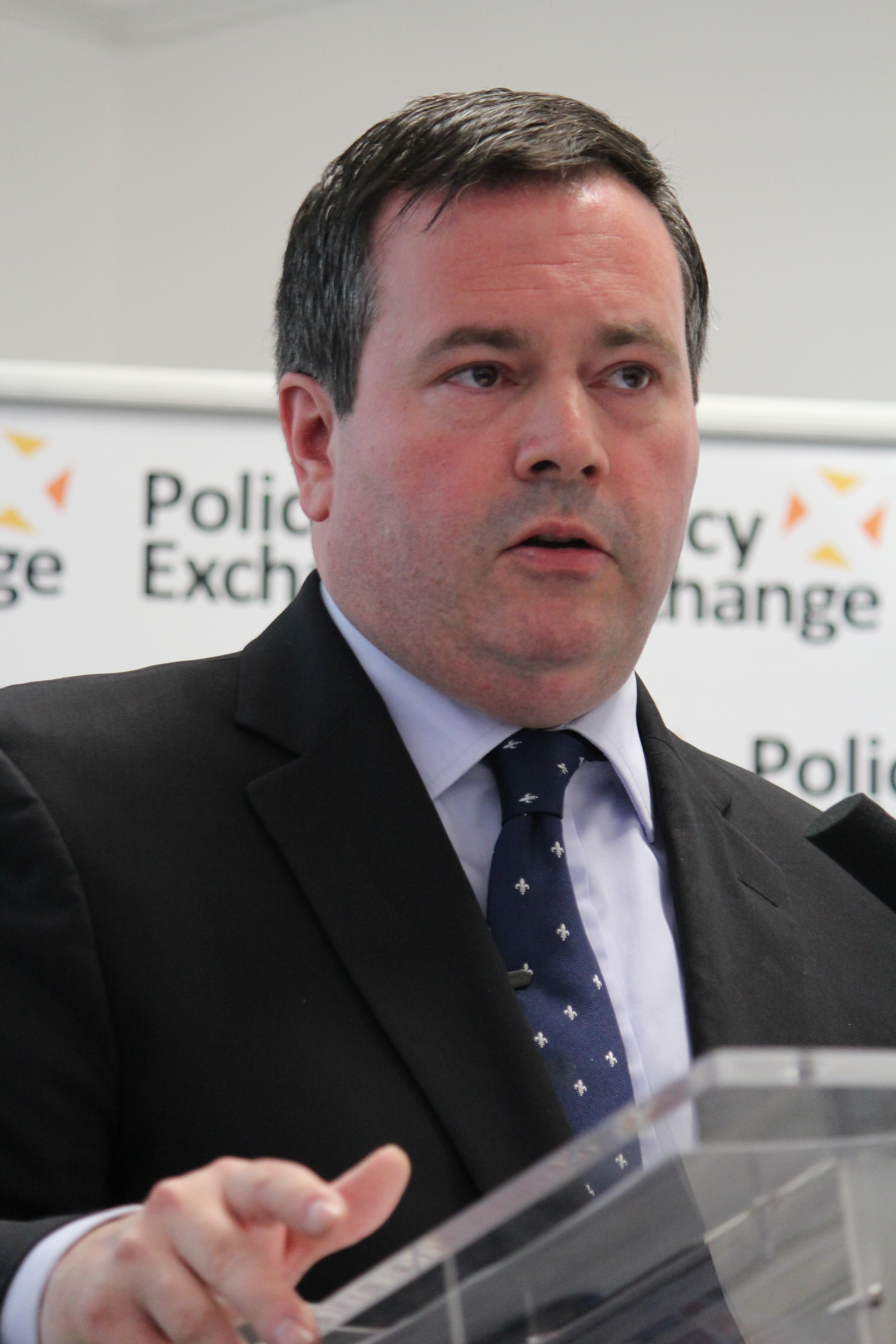

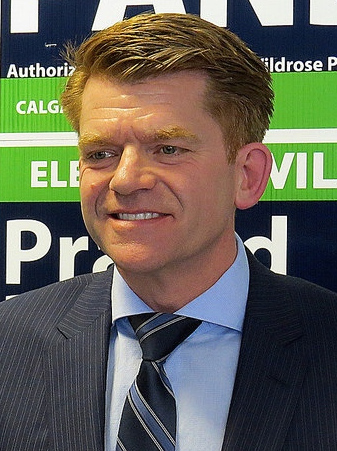

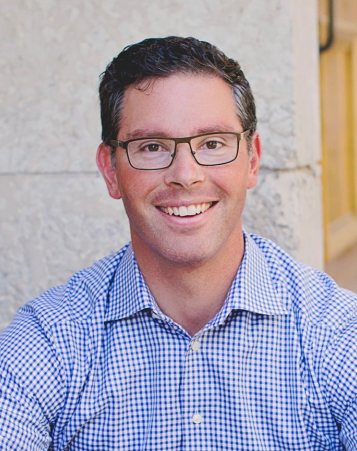
| Candidate | Jason Kenney | Brian Jean | Doug Schweitzer |
| Votes | 35,623 | 18,336 | 4,273 |
| Percentage | 61.2% | 31.5% | 7.3% |
Leader before election
Nathan Cooper (interim)
Leader
Jason Kenney

2017 United Conservative Party leadership election
- Date: October 28, 2017
- Convention: BMO Centre; Calgary, Alberta
- Won by: Jason Kenney
- Ballots: 1
- Candidates: 3
- Entrance fee: C$95,000 ($20,000 of which is a refundable compliance bond)

A United Conservative Party leadership election was held in Alberta on October 28, 2017 following votes on July 22, 2017 by memberships of both the Wildrose Party and the Progressive Conservative Association of Alberta to merge and form the United Conservative Party. The Unity Agreement between the parties states the leadership election will be held on a One Member One Vote basis.

Both Jason Kenney, leader of the PC Party, and Wildrose leader Brian Jean were expected to stand for leader of the new party, with Jean saying at the press conference that announced the merger agreement: "Clearly we're both running for the leadership of this new party." Former Conservative Party of Canada interim leader Rona Ambrose ruled herself out of consideration.

== "Kamikaze campaign" scandal ==
The Royal Canadian Mounted Police and the Alberta Election Commissioner are investigating allegations that Jason Kenney and his team were involved in orchestrating Jeff Callaway's campaign for the leadership of the United Conservative Party in an attempt to harm Kenney's biggest rival, Brian Jean. Documents obtained by The Toronto Star confirm that Kenney's campaign controlled major aspects of Callaway's campaign, including the providing of strategic plans, attack ads, speeches, and talking points intended to discredit Jean. These documents have since been handed over the election commissioner, according to Callaway's former campaign manager, Cameron Davies. Davies also said that Kenney had attended a meeting at Callaway's house in July 2017 where the "kamikaze campaign" was discussed and that Kenney had first-hand knowledge of this strategy.

A leaked document alleged that Jason Kenney's team first approached Derek Fildebrandt in July 2017 about running a "dark-horse" campaign but ultimately decided against working with him. Fildebrandt confirmed this account but stated that it was he who rejected the idea.

An emergency injunction was sought to halt the probe into the financing of Callaway's UCP leadership campaign for the duration of the 2019 Alberta general election, but was denied by Court of Queen's Bench Justice Anne Kirker who ruled it was in the public interest for the investigation to continue.

Callaway, who declared his candidacy on August 10, 2017, only to withdraw on October 4, after the debates but prior to voting, was issued 24 fines totalling $70,000 by the Alberta Election Commissioner on July 18, 2019, during an investigation into allegations that Kenney's leadership team orchestrated Callaway's candidacy in order to attack to attack Jean and that Callaway's campaign was funded by illegal donations. While, Alberta elections commissioner Lorne Gibson has led to fines against 15 people totalling $207,223.

== Timeline ==
- March 18, 2017 - Jason Kenney, former federal cabinet minister, is elected PC leader on a platform of joining with the Wildrose to form a unified right-of-centre party.
- May 18, 2017 - PC leader Jason Kenney and Wildrose leader Brian Jean announce that merger referendums will be held in their parties on July 22, 2017. If they pass, with thresholds of 50%+1 of PC members and 75% of Wildrose members, the parties will begin the process of merging into the United Conservative Party, or UCP.
- June 1, 2017 - Doug Schweitzer declares his candidacy.
- July 22, 2017 - The PC and Wildrose parties hold unity referendums on the question of merging into the United Conservative Party. Both parties approve the merger with 95% support. Brian Jean declares his candidacy.
- July 29, 2017 - Jason Kenney declares his candidacy.
- August 10, 2017 - Jeff Callaway declares his candidacy.
- September 12, 2017 - Nomination period officially closes at 5pm MT (UTC−6). Half of entrance fee is due.
- September 20, 2017 - Leadership debate held in Calgary.
- September 28, 2017 - Leadership debate held in Edmonton.
- September 29, 2017 - Membership sales end at 5 pm MT (UTC−6).
- October 3, 2017 - Leadership debate held in Red Deer.
- October 4, 2017 - Jeff Callaway withdraws his candidacy.
- October 5, 2017 - Balance of entrance fee is due.
- October 12, 2017 - Leadership debate held in Fort McMurray.
- October 13, 2017, 5 pm MT (UTC−6) - Deadline for members to register to vote using photo ID as proof of identity.
- October 17, 2017 - Leadership debate held in Lethbridge.
- October 26, 2017, 9 am MT (UTC−6) - Voting begins via online and telephone balloting.
- October 28, 2017, 5 pm MT (UTC−6) - Voting ends. Results announced at the BMO Centre in Calgary shortly after the close of voting.

== Declared candidates ==
=== Brian Jean ===
Background

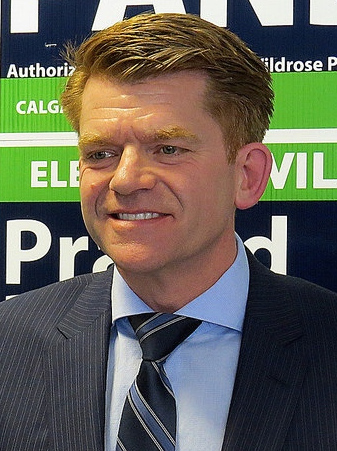
Jean in 2015

Brian Jean, 54, was the final Leader of the Wildrose Party (2015–2017). Jean is the MLA for Fort McMurray-Conklin (2015–2018). He served as MP for Athabasca (2004–2006) and Fort McMurray—Athabasca (2006–2014), Parliamentary Secretary to the Minister of Transport, Infrastructure and Communities (2006–2011), and Leader of the Official Opposition in Alberta (2015–2017). Jean was elected Wildrose leader after previous leader Danielle Smith and eight other Wildrose MLAs crossed the floor to join the PC government of then-Premier Jim Prentice.

Date candidacy declared: July 22, 2017
Campaign website: brianjean.ca
Amount of deposit paid: Full
Supporters
MLAs: (11) Leela Aheer (Chestermere-Rocky View), Wayne Anderson (Highwood), Dave Hanson (Lac La Biche-St. Paul-Two Hills), Todd Loewen (Grande Prairie-Smoky), Don MacIntyre (Innisfail-Sylvan Lake), Angela Pitt (Airdrie), Ron Orr (Lacombe-Ponoka), Dave Schneider (Little Bow), Pat Stier (Livingstone-Macleod), Glenn van Dijken (Barrhead-Morinville-Westlock), Tany Yao (Fort McMurray-Wood Buffalo)
Federal politicians: (1) Blaine Calkins (MP for Red Deer—Lacombe)
Municipal politicians: (6) Omer Moghrabi (Lac La Biche County Mayor), Fred Nash (Rocky Mountain House Mayor), Arnold Romaniuk (Two Hills Mayor), Steve Upham (County of St. Paul No. 19 Reeve), Angie Warwick (Prairie Land School Division Trustee for Hanna), Chris Warwick (Hanna Mayor)
Former federal politicians: (1) Myron Thompson (MP for Wild Rose, 1993–2008)
Other prominent supporters: (4) Theo Fleury (Former professional ice hockey player), Rod Hay (8-time Canadian Rodeo champion), Tim Moen (Leader of the Libertarian Party of Canada), David Yager (President of the Wildrose Party, 2012–2014)

=== Jason Kenney ===
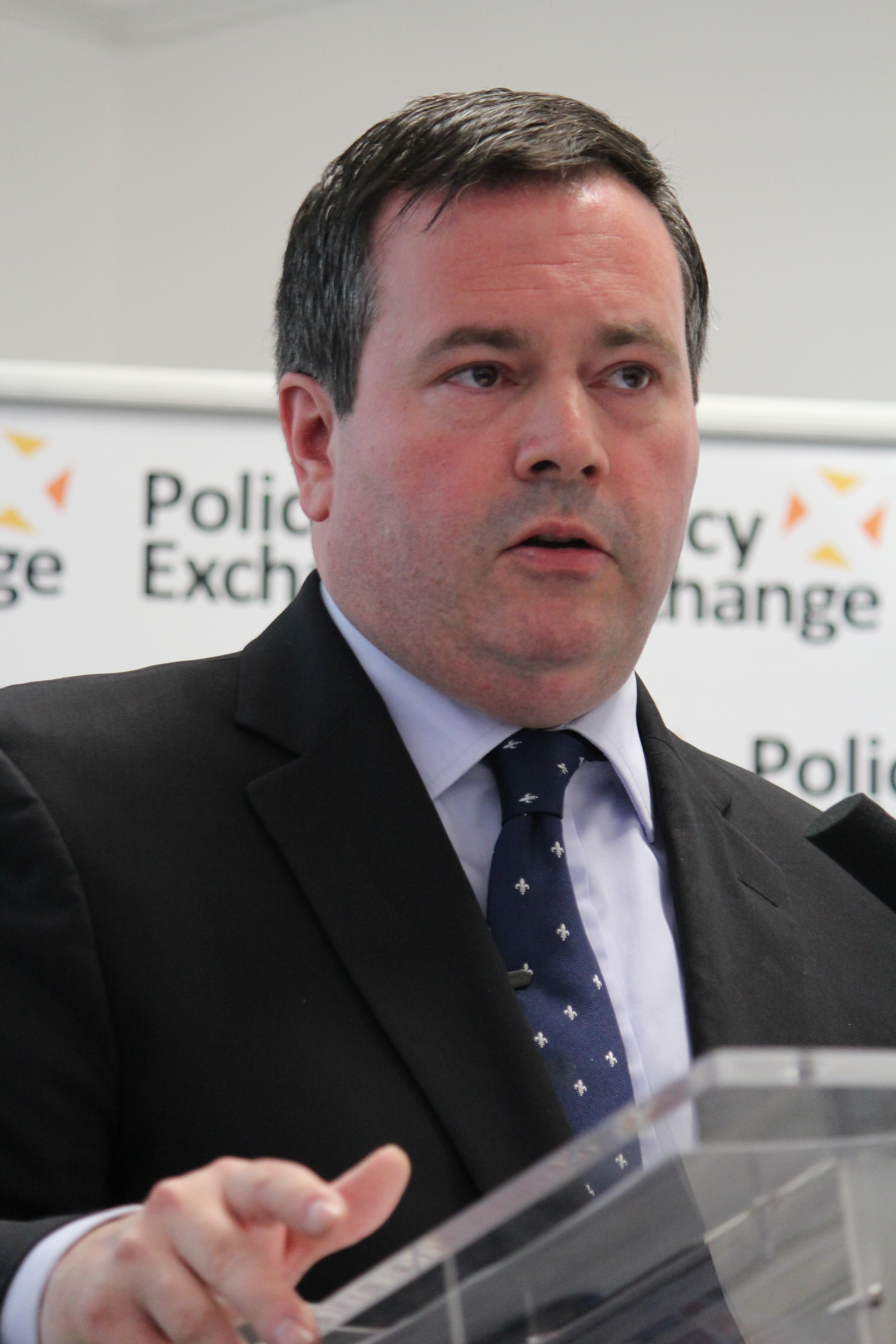
Kenney in 2014

Background

Jason Kenney, 49, was the final Leader of the Progressive Conservative Association of Alberta (2017). He served as MP for Calgary Southeast (1997–2015) and Calgary Midnapore (2015–2016), and was Minister of Citizenship and Immigration (2008–2013), Minister of Employment and Social Development (2013–2015), Minister of Multiculturalism and Citizenship (2013–2015), and Minister of National Defence (2015) under the Harper government. Kenney was elected PC leader on a promise to merge the PC and Wildrose parties.

Date candidacy declared: July 29, 2017
Campaign website: jasonkenney.ca
Amount of deposit paid: Full
Supporters
MLAs: (10) Drew Barnes (Cypress-Medicine Hat), Scott Cyr (Bonnyville-Cold Lake) Prab Gill (Calgary-Greenway), Grant Hunter (Cardston-Taber-Warner), Ric McIver (Calgary-Hays), Jason Nixon (Rimbey-Rocky Mountain House-Sundre), Prasad Panda (Calgary-Foothills) Dave Rodney (Calgary-Lougheed), Mark Smith (Drayton Valley-Devon), Rick Strankman (Drumheller-Stettler)
Federal politicians: (23) John Barlow (MP for Foothills), Bob Benzen (MP for Calgary Heritage), Michael Cooper (MP for St. Albert—Edmonton), Kerry Diotte (MP for Edmonton Griesbach), Earl Dreeshen (MP for Red Deer—Mountain View), Jim Eglinski (MP for Yellowhead), Garnett Genuis (MP for Sherwood Park—Fort Saskatchewan), Rachael Harder (MP for Lethbridge), Matt Jeneroux (MP for Edmonton Riverbend), Pat Kelly (MP for Calgary Rocky Ridge), Tom Kmiec (MP for Calgary Shepard), Ron Liepert (MP for Calgary Signal Hill), Dane Lloyd (MP for Sturgeon River—Parkland), Kelly McCauley (MP for Edmonton West), Glen Motz (Medicine Hat—Cardston—Warner), Deepak Obhrai (MP for Calgary Forest Lawn), Michelle Rempel (MP for Calgary Nose Hill), Blake Richards (MP for Banff—Airdrie), Martin Shields (MP for Bow River), Kevin Sorenson (MP for Battle River—Crowfoot), Shannon Stubbs (MP for Lakeland), Arnold Viersen (MP for Peace River—Westlock), Chris Warkentin (MP for Grande Prairie-Mackenzie)
Municipal politicians: (3) Craig Copeland (City of Cold Lake Mayor), Maggie Croenen (Town of Cardston Mayor), Andrew Prokop (Town of Taber Councillor and Interim Mayor)
Former MLAs: (11) Jack Ady (Cardston-Chief Mountain, 1986–1997), David Dorward (Edmonton-Gold Bar, 2012–2015), Jonathan Denis (Calgary-Egmont, 2008–2012; Calgary-Acadia, 2012–2015), Denis Ducharme (Bonnyville-Cold Lake, 1997–2008), Heather Forsyth (Calgary-Fish Creek, 1993–2015), Paul Hinman (Calgary-Glenmore, 2009–2012; Cardston-Taber-Warner, 2004–2008), Genia Leskiw (Bonnyville-Cold Lake, 2008–2015), Jason Luan (Calgary-Hawkwood, 2012–2015), Ty Lund (Rocky Mountain House, 1989–2012), Marvin Moore (Smoky River, 1971–1989), Shayne Saskiw (Lac La Biche-St. Paul-Two Hills, 2012–2015)
Former federal politicians: (1) Rona Ambrose (MP for Sturgeon River—Parkland)
Other prominent supporters: (2) Jeff Callaway (President of the Wildrose Party, 2008–2010; 2014–2017), Candice Malcolm (Calgary Sun Columnist)

=== Doug Schweitzer ===
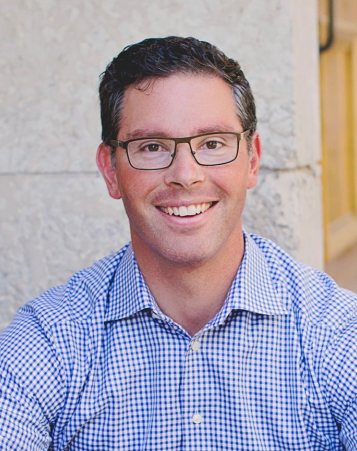
Schweitzer in 2017

Background

Doug Schweitzer, 38, is a Calgary lawyer and longtime PC party member. He served as CEO of the Manitoba PC Party (2008–2009) and campaign manager of Jim Prentice's successful PC leadership campaign in 2014.

Date candidacy declared: June 1, 2017
Campaign website: dougschweitzer.com
Amount of deposit paid: Full
Supporters
MLAs: (1) Wayne Drysdale (Grande Prairie-Wapiti)
Former MLAs: (1) Peter Elzinga (Sherwood Park, 1986–1993)
Former federal politicians: (1) Jay Hill (Prince George—Peace River, 1993–2010)
Other prominent supporters: (2) Kevin O'Leary (Businessman and television personality), Chris Warren (President of the Progressive Conservative Association of Alberta, 1998; 2002–2004)

Policies

- Calls for massive cuts to Alberta's corporate and personal income tax rates, including replacing progressive income tax with a flat tax of 10% for those making more than $100,000 a year and 9% for those making less than that amount.
- Advocates the elimination of the province's carbon levy. Proposes cutting salaries of public sector workers across the board by 3% for those making less than $120,000 a year and by 6% for those making more than that.
- Calls himself a moderate on social issues.
- Says most Albertans are "socially moderate" and that issues such as "gay-straight alliances," "diversity," and inclusion of women are non-partisan issues.

== Withdrawn candidates ==
=== Jeff Callaway ===
Background

Jeff Callaway, 40, was formerly President of the Wildrose Party (2008–2010; 2014–2017) and 2015 Wildrose candidate for Calgary-North West. He is currently a Calgary-based senior investment advisor.

Date candidacy declared: August 10, 2017
Date withdrawn: October 4, 2017
Subsequently endorsed: Jason Kenney

== Declined ==
- Leela Aheer, MLA for Chestermere-Rocky View (2015–2023). Endorsed Jean.
- Rona Ambrose, Interim Leader of the Conservative Party of Canada and Leader of the Official Opposition (2015–2017), MP for Edmonton—Spruce Grove (2004–2015) and Sturgeon River—Parkland (2015–2017), Minister of the Environment (2006–2007), Minister of Intergovernmental Affairs (2007–2008), Minister of Labour (2008–2010), Minister of Public Works and Government Services (2010–2013), and Minister of Health (2013–2015).
- Jonathan Denis, MLA for Calgary-Egmont (2008–2012) and Calgary-Acadia (2012–2015), Minister of Housing and Urban Affairs (2010–2011), Solicitor General, Attorney General, and Minister of Justice for Alberta (2012–2015). Endorsed Kenney.
- Derek Fildebrandt, MLA for Strathmore-Brooks (2015–2019) and Alberta Director and National Research Director of the Canadian Taxpayers Federation (2009–2014).
- Paul Hinman, Leader of the Alberta Alliance (2005–2008) and the Wildrose Alliance (2008–2009) and MLA for Cardston-Taber-Warner (2004–2008) and Calgary-Glenmore (2009–2012). Announced interest in running but was unable to raise enough money to pay entrance fee. Endorsed Kenney.
- Ric McIver, Interim Leader of the Progressive Conservative Association of Alberta (2015–2017), MLA for Calgary-Hays (2012–present), City of Calgary Alderman for Ward 12 (2001–2010), Minister of Transportation (2012–2013), Minister of Infrastructure (2013–2014), and Minister of Jobs, Skills, Training and Labour (2014–2015). Endorsed Kenney.

== Results ==
| Candidate | Votes | Percentage |
|---|---|---|
| Jason Kenney | 35,623 | 61.2% |
| Brian Jean | 18,336 | 31.5% |
| Doug Schweitzer | 4,273 | 7.3% |
| Total | 58,232 | 100% |

== See also ==
- 2017 Progressive Conservative Association of Alberta leadership election
- 2015 Wildrose Party leadership election
- Leadership election
