= Brian Jean =

Canadian politician

The Honourable Brian Jean ECA KC MLA
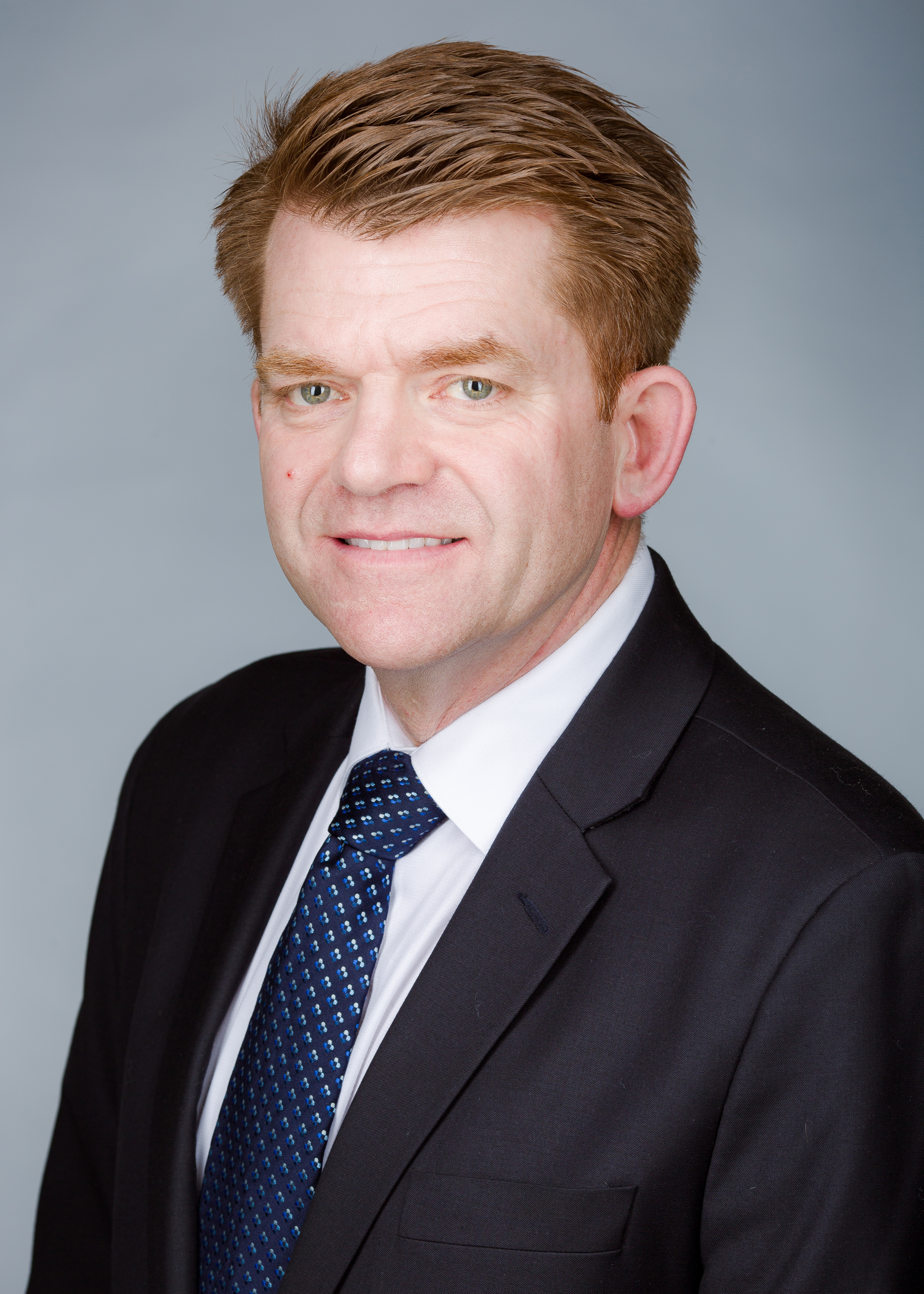
- Jean in 2015

Minister of Energy and Minerals
- Incumbent
- Assumed office June 9, 2023
- Premier: Danielle Smith
- Preceded by: Peter Guthrie

Minister of Jobs, Economy and Northern Development
- In office October 21, 2022 – June 9, 2023
- Premier: Danielle Smith
- Preceded by: Tanya Fir (Jobs, Economy and Innovation)
- Succeeded by: Matt Jones

Leader of the Opposition of Alberta
- In office May 5, 2015 – July 24, 2017
- Preceded by: Heather Forsyth
- Succeeded by: Nathan Cooper

Leader of the Wildrose Party
- In office March 28, 2015 – July 24, 2017
- Preceded by: Heather Forsyth (interim)
- Succeeded by: Nathan Cooper (as interim leader of the UCP)

Parliamentary Secretary to the Minister of Transport, Infrastructure and Communities
- In office February 7, 2006 – March 26, 2011
- Minister: Lawrence Cannon; John Baird; Chuck Strahl; Denis Lebel
- Preceded by: Charles Hubbard
- Succeeded by: Pierre Poilievre
Parliamentary constituencies
Member of the Legislative Assembly of Alberta for Fort McMurray-Lac La Biche (Fort McMurray-Conklin 2015–2018)
Incumbent
Assumed office March 15, 2022
Preceded by	Laila Goodridge
In office May 5, 2015 – March 5, 2018
Preceded by	Don Scott
Succeeded by	Laila Goodridge
Member of Parliament for Fort McMurray—Athabasca (Athabasca 2004–2006)
In office June 28, 2004 – January 17, 2014
Preceded by	David Chatters
Succeeded by	David Yurdiga

Personal details
- Born: Brian Michael Jean; February 3, 1963 (age 63) Kelowna, British Columbia, Canada
- Party: United Conservative Party
- Other political affiliations: Conservative (federal); Wildrose (provincial, until 2017)
- Spouse: Kimberley Michelutti (m. 2016)
- Education: Warner Pacific College; Bond University; University of Calgary
- Occupation: Politician; lawyer
- Website: brianjean.ca

Brian Michael Jean ECA KC MLA (born February 3, 1963) is a Canadian politician who, since June 9, 2023, has been Alberta's minister of Energy and Minerals. He has served as member of the Legislative Assembly (MLA) for Fort McMurray-Lac La Biche since March 16, 2022. He was leader of the Opposition and the last leader of the Wildrose Party from 2015 to 2017 before its merger into the United Conservative Party (UCP). Jean was a member of Parliament (MP) with the Conservative Party from 2004 to 2014 before entering provincial politics.

Jean worked as a lawyer in Fort McMurray for 11 years before he was elected to Parliament, where he represented Athabasca from 2004 to 2006 and Fort McMurray—Athabasca from 2006 to 2014, when he resigned from the House of Commons. He returned to political life in February 2015 when he announced that he would seek the leadership of the Wildrose Party. He was elected party leader on March 28, 2015. In the 2015 provincial election, Jean was elected in the provincial riding of Fort McMurray-Conklin and became the leader of the opposition as the Wildrose Party formed the Official Opposition to the governing Alberta New Democratic Party (NDP). Jean ceased to lead the Wildrose Party when it merged with the Progressive Conservatives (PCs) to become the United Conservative Party in 2017 and ran to be leader of the new party, losing to Jason Kenney. He resigned his seat in the Alberta legislature on March 5, 2018.

Jean re-entered provincial politics after winning a by-election on March 16, 2022. Upon Premier Kenney's resignation announcement on May 18, 2022, Jean declared his candidacy in the United Conservative party leadership election, which took place on October 6, 2022. He finished third on the first ballot with 11 percent of the vote, ultimately losing to Danielle Smith after his elimination from the sixth and final ballot.

== Background ==
Jean was born in Kelowna, British Columbia, and moved to Fort McMurray, Alberta, in 1967 when he was four years old. His mother, Frances Jean founded Fort McMurray's first newspaper in this same year, as well as City Centre Group, Inc., a business that primarily owns car-washes, car-detailing services, and some commercial office space rentals. City Centre Group, Inc. also owns Alberta Local History Publishing, a small-scale publishing house with titles focused on the "determination, adventure, and [...] new frontier" history of Northern Alberta. Despite frequently claiming to have a poor working-class background, Jean stated as recently as 2006 that his family's net-worth grew in just 10 years from "$2 million to $20 million".

Jean has a Bachelor of Science degree from Warner Pacific College in Portland, Oregon, and Master of Business Administration and Bachelor of Laws degrees from Bond University in Gold Coast, Queensland, Australia. He also attended the law school at the University of Calgary, where he received qualification to be admitted to the Law Society of Alberta. This allowed him to practice law for 11 years in Fort McMurray prior to his political career.

Jean has worked as a farmhand, a printer's assistant, a businessperson, a lawyer, and an inspirational speaker. In his community, Jean served as the chairman of the Children's Health Foundation in Northern Alberta, chair of the Alberta Summer Games, president of the Fort McMurray Downtown Business Association, and director of the Fort McMurray Chamber of Commerce.

He currently sits on the advisory board of Barkuna Capital, a Calgary-based financial institution that describes itself as "More Than Merchant Banking".

== Political career ==
=== Member of Parliament ===
Jean was first elected to the House of Commons as a Conservative Party of Canada candidate in the riding of Athabasca in 2004, sitting in the Official Opposition to Paul Martin's Liberal government. He was re-elected in the renamed riding of Fort McMurray—Athabasca in 2006, when the Conservatives formed government under Stephen Harper. In February 2006, Jean was appointed as the parliamentary secretary to minister of transport, infrastructure and communities, Lawrence Cannon. Jean was re-elected again in 2008 and 2011. After the 2011 election, he declined reappointment as parliamentary secretary in order to focus on his constituency needs. In the House of Commons, Jean served on the Finance, Justice, and Industry Committees.

On January 10, 2014, Jean announced that he would be resigning his seat on January 17, 2014, to return to private life in Fort McMurray.

=== Leader of the Wildrose Party ===
The Wildrose Party was in disarray in late 2014 after eleven MLAs, including leader Danielle Smith, crossed the floor to the ruling Progressive Conservative Association of Alberta. A leadership election was organized to choose a new leader and Jean was encouraged to run. Jean entered the race on February 25, 2015. He was elected party leader on March 28, 2015, with 55 per cent of the vote, defeating Cypress-Medicine Hat MLA Drew Barnes and former Strathcona County mayor Linda Osinchuk.

The 2015 Alberta election was held on May 5, 2015, less than two months after Jean became Wildrose leader. The party retained its standing as Official Opposition in the legislature, growing its caucus from 17 in 2012, and 5 at dissolution, to 21. For the first time in Alberta history, the NDP formed government, with Rachel Notley becoming the premier of Alberta. This marked the end of 43 years of government by the Progressive Conservatives.

On August 30, 2016, Jean was hosting a forum in Fort McMurray when a local advocate for seniors complained about the quality of housing and health care for seniors. Jean answered that he had "been beating this drum for 10, 11 years" and said “I will continue to beat it, I promise. But it's against the law to beat Rachel Notley.”

Jean then apologized for what he later called "an inappropriate attempt at humour" and insisted Notley cares about housing and health care for seniors. He also led the room to applaud Notley for approving the construction of a long-term care home for seniors built in downtown Fort McMurray, an issue that former premier Ed Stelmach and PC MLA Guy Boutilier had feuded over.

==== Merger with PCs into UCP ====
Jean's former federal caucus colleague Jason Kenney became Progressive Conservative leader after winning that party's leadership election in early 2017. Kenney's platform called for uniting the Progressive Conservative and Wildrose parties to form a united right-of-centre alliance. On March 20, 2017, Jean met with Kenney to begin unity discussions.

On May 18, 2017, Jean and Kenney announced that their two parties had come to a merger agreement and on July 22, 2017, the merger was passed with 95 per cent support from both the PCs and the Wildrose. The merger agreement formed the United Conservative Party, a leadership election occurred on October 28, 2017, in which Jean was defeated by Kenney, and a founding convention to be held in 2018.

Jean announced his resignation from the legislature on March 5, 2018. He said in an interview that he knew people would accuse him of being a sore loser following his defeat to Kenney, but insisted he was resigning to rebuild his home that was destroyed in 2016 Fort McMurray wildfire and spend time with family, including a sister who was battling Stage 4 cancer at the time. He was succeeded by UCP MLA Laila Goodridge in the 2018 Fort McMurray-Conklin by-election.

=== Return to politics ===
Jean became a vocal critic of Kenney's leadership through social media and guest columns in the Edmonton Journal. After criticizing Kenney's leadership during the COVID-19 pandemic, Jean called for his resignation on June 7, 2021.

On November 3, 2021, Jean announced that he would seek the UCP nomination for an upcoming by-election in Fort McMurray-Lac La Biche, and won this nomination contest on December 12 against Joshua Gogo, with 68 per cent of the vote.

During the nomination race, a post to Jean's LinkedIn profile said Kenney and his supporters were “pushing a Nigerian economist who lives in Fort McMurray” to be the UCP candidate, referring to Gogo's ethnicity. The post was removed and Jean apologized, saying the post's "unacceptable connotation" was written by an unnamed volunteer.

Jean continued to criticize Kenney's leadership during the by-election campaign and accused Kenney of being too weak to defeat Rachel Notley in the 2023 Alberta general election. The UCP did not send any volunteers to help Jean with his campaign and Kenney criticized Jean for resigning from public office twice before.

Jean won the March 15, 2022 by-election after he openly campaigned in favour of removing Kenney from the leadership of the UCP.

Upon Kenney's announcement on May 18, 2022 that he would resign as premier, Jean declared his candidacy in the United Conservative party leadership election, which occurred on October 6, 2022. After initially leading in opinion polls, Jean finished third.

Upon Danielle Smith’s victory in the leadership race, Jean was appointed to Smith’s Cabinet as the Minister for Jobs, Economy, and Northern Development. On June 9, 2023, Jean was appointed Alberta's Minister of Energy and Minerals, with his deputy minister being Larry Kaumeyer, the former CEO of Ducks Unlimited.

== Electoral record ==
=== Provincial ===
2023 Alberta general election: Fort McMurray-Lac La Biche
Party	Candidate	Votes	%	±%
United Conservative	Brian Jean	7,692	73.57	+9.93
New Democratic	Calan William Simeon Hobbs	2,561	24.50	+5.99
Independent	Kevin Johnston	202	1.93	–
Total		10,455	99.33	–
Rejected and declined		70	0.67	
Turnout		10,525	42.90	
Eligible voters		24,536		
United Conservative hold		Swing		+3.63
Source(s) Source: Elections Alberta

Candidate	Round 1		Round 2		Round 3		Round 4		Round 5		Round 6	
Candidate	Votes	%	Votes	%	Votes	%	Votes	%	Votes	%	Votes	%
Danielle Smith	34,949	41.3	34,981	41.4	35,095	41.7	38,496	46.2	39,270	47.7	42,423	53.77
Travis Toews	24,831	29.4	25,054	29.7	25,593	30.4	26,592	31.9	30,794	37.4	36,480	46.23
Brian Jean	9,301	11.1	9,504	11.3	10,157	12.1	11,251	13.5	12,203	14.8	Eliminated	
Rebecca Schulz	5,835	6.9	6,180	7.3	6,784	8.0	6,972	8.4	Eliminated			
Todd Loewen	6,496	7.7	6,512	7.7	6,596	7.8	Eliminated					
Rajan Sawhney	1,787	2.1	2,246	2.7	Eliminated							
Leela Aheer	1,394	1.6	Eliminated									
Total	84,593	100.00	84,405	100.00	84,225	100.00	83,311	100.00	82,267	100.00	78,903	100.00

Alberta provincial by-election, 15 March 2022: Fort McMurray-Lac La Biche
Party	Candidate	Votes	%	±%
United Conservative	Brian Jean	3,717	63.6%	-2.73
New Democratic	Ariana Mancini	1,081	18.5%	-6.01
Wildrose Independence	Paul Hinman	628	10.8%	–
Liberal	Abdulhakim Hussein	211	3.6%	–
Alberta Party	Michelle Landsiedel	98	1.7%	-4.08
Independent	Brian Deheer	57	1.0%	–
Alberta Advantage Party	Marilyn Burns	25	0.4%	–
Alberta Independence	Steven Mellott	24	0.4%	-1.43
Total valid votes		5,837		
Total rejected ballots		0		
Turnout		24.27%		
Eligible voters		24,048		

2015 Alberta general election: Fort McMurray-Conklin
Party	Candidate	Votes	%	±%
Wildrose	Brian Jean	2,950	43.85	+3.70
New Democratic	Ariana Mancini	2,071	30.79	+22.86
Progressive Conservative	Don Scott	1,502	22.33	−26.62
Liberal	Melinda Hollis	204	3.03	+0.06
Total valid votes		6,727	99.10	–
Rejected, spoiled and declined		61	0.90	+0.07
Turnout		6,788	44.45	+8.15
Eligible electors		15,272		
Wildrose gain from Progressive Conservative		Swing		+15.16
Source(s) Elections Alberta. "Election Results - Fort McMurray-Conklin".

=== Federal ===
Athabasca district (in Alberta)

2011 Canadian federal election
Party	Candidate	Votes	%	±%	Expenditures
Conservative	Brian Jean	21,988	71.84	+4.72	$68,113
New Democratic	Berend Wilting	4,053	13.24	+0.33	$24
Liberal	Karen Young	3,230	10.55	-0.05	$20,825
Green	Jule Asterisk	1,374	4.49	-1.88	$2,734
Total valid votes/Expense limit		30,605	100.00		
Total rejected ballots		144	0.47	+0.13	
Turnout		30,749	40.75	+5	
Eligible voters		75,456	–	–	

2008 Canadian federal election
Party	Candidate	Votes	%	±%	Expenditures
Conservative	Brian Jean	17,160	67.12	+2.67	$48,046
New Democratic	Mark Voyageur	3,300	12.91	-1.58	$1,853
Liberal	John Webb	2,710	10.60	-4.17	$5,459
Green	Dylan Richards	1,628	6.37	+1.47	
Independent	Shawn Reimer	350	1.37	–	$666
First Peoples National	John Malcolm	233	0.91	-0.47	
Christian Heritage	Jacob Strydhorst	186	0.73	–	$733
Total valid votes/Expense limit		25,567	100.00	$101,823	
Total rejected ballots		86	0.34	+0.03	
Turnout		25,653	36	-12	

2006 Canadian federal election
Party	Candidate	Votes	%	±%	Expenditures
Conservative	Brian Jean	20,342	64.45	+4.16	$59,027
Liberal	Mel H. Buffalo	4,663	14.77	-9.28	$3,333
New Democratic	Roland Lefort	4,573	14.49	+4.03	$19,091
Green	Ian Hopfe	1,547	4.90	-0.28	$8
First Peoples National	John Malcolm	437	1.38	–	
Total valid votes		31,549	100.00		
Total rejected ballots		97	0.31	-0.06	
Turnout		31,646	48.32	+0.47	

2004 Canadian federal election
Party	Candidate	Votes	%	±%	Expenditures
Conservative	Brian Jean	17,942	60.3	-6.40	$84,096
Liberal	Doug Faulkner	7,158	24.05	-4.35	$52,713
New Democratic	Robert Cree	3,115	10.46	+7.94	$4,942
Green	Ian Hopfe	1,542	5.18	+4.18	$112
Total valid votes		29,757	100.00		
Total rejected ballots		112	0.37	+0.07	
Turnout		29,869	47.85	-8.43	
