= Laila Goodridge =

Canadian politician

Laila Goodridge MP

Member of Parliament for Fort McMurray—Cold Lake
- Incumbent
- Assumed office September 20, 2021
- Preceded by: David Yurdiga

Member of the Legislative Assembly of Alberta for Fort McMurray-Lac La Biche (Fort McMurray-Conklin; 2018–2019)
- In office July 12, 2018 – August 15, 2021
- Preceded by: Brian Jean
- Succeeded by: Brian Jean (2022)

Personal details
- Born: 1986 or 1987 (age 39–40) Fort McMurray, Alberta, Canada
- Party: Conservative (federal); United Conservative (provincial)
- Other political affiliations: Wildrose (provincial, before 2017)
- Education: University of Alberta (Campus Saint-Jean)

Laila Goodridge MP is a Canadian politician who has served as the member of Parliament (MP) for Fort McMurray—Cold Lake, Alberta, from the Conservative Party since 2021.

Goodridge served as Member of the Legislative Assembly (MLA) for Fort McMurray-Lac La Biche from 2018 to 2021. She was first elected to the Legislative Assembly of Alberta in the Fort McMurray-Conklin by-election on July 12, 2018. She was appointed Parliamentary Secretary for the Francophonie on June 23, 2019.

In August 2021 Goodridge resigned as MLA to successfully run as the Conservative Party's MP candidate in Fort McMurray—Cold Lake MP in the 2021 Canadian federal election. She is currently the Conservative Party's shadow minister for families, children and social development after serving as shadow minister for addictions.

== Political career ==
=== Internships and constituency work ===
Goodridge first developed an interest in politics in high school when she read the platforms of every major Canadian political party; she settled on supporting what was then the Canadian Alliance. After the Alliance and Progressive Conservative Party of Canada merged in 2003, she entered politics later that year as a campaign volunteer for Brian Jean, who was running as the Conservative Party's MP candidate in Fort McMurray—Athabasca.

She considered running as a Conservative Party candidate in the 2014 Fort McMurray-Athabasca by-election after Jean resigned as MP, but decided not to pursue the nomination.

During the 2015 Alberta general election, Goodridge ran as a Wildrose Party candidate in the riding of Grande Prairie-Wapiti. She finished third behind Alberta NDP candidate Mary Dahr. The seat was won by PC MLA Wayne Drysdale.

Goodridge was an active volunteer and staffer in conservative politics. Prior to the 2015 Alberta election she was working for Minister of the Environment Leona Aglukkaq. She was also the former constituency assistant for Conservative Calgary Centre MP Joan Crockatt, and was an intern for Conservative Senator and former Minister of Canadian Heritage and Official Languages Josée Verner.

Goodridge was hired by Jean in 2016 to help with disaster recovery work following the 2016 Fort McMurray wildfire, then moved to Edmonton to work as a Legislative Outreach Assistant for the Wildrose and United Conservative Party.

=== Provincial politics ===
Jean resigned as MLA for Fort McMurray-Conklin in February 2018 after his failed bid to become leader of the United Conservative Party. Goodridge won a nomination race against three other candidates. She was elected to the Legislative Assembly of Alberta during the Fort McMurray-Conklin by-election on July 12, 2018.

She was re-elected to represent the constituency of Fort McMurray-Lac La Biche in the 30th Alberta Legislature in the 2019 Alberta general election on April 16, 2019. She was appointed Parliamentary Secretary for the Francophonie on June 23.

In addition to serving as an MLA, Goodridge was the Chair of the Standing Committee on Families and Communities and a member of the Special Standing Committee on Members' Services and the Select Special Democratic Accountability Committee.

=== Federal politics ===
On August 15, 2021, David Yurdiga, MP for Fort McMurray—Cold Lake, resigned as the Conservative Party of Canada's candidate in the riding for the 2021 Canadian federal election. A Conservative Party spokesperson cited "private medical issues" as the reason for Yurdiga's resignation.

Conservative Party leader Erin O'Toole asked Goodridge if she would resign as MLA and replace Yurdiga. Goodridge accepted the nomination and was elected to the House of Commons on September 20 with a victory of 67%, followed by McDonald's 12.8%.

Goodridge remained neutral during the 2022 Conservative Party of Canada leadership election, but welcomed the election of Pierre Poilievre as party leader.

On November 10, Goodridge was named the Conservative Party's shadow minister for families, children and social development. Prior to the 2022 Russian invasion of Ukraine, Goodridge began lobbying for improvements to how Canada accepts refugees. She has also helped Ukrainian refugee applicants arrive in Canada.

Goodridge was banned from entering Russia following the invasion of Ukraine. Goodridge, whose mother is part of the Ukrainian diaspora in Canada, called the ban "a badge of honour."

On October 12, 2022, Conservative Party Leader Pierre Poilievre appointed Goodridge shadow minister of addictions.

== 2021 nomination controversy ==
Goodridge's appointment as the Conservative Party's federal candidate during the 2021 election was met with controversy from some local party members.

Yurdiga had announced his resignation one day before Prime Minister Justin Trudeau dropped the writ announcing the election. Conservative Party officials said Goodridge's appointment was necessary because the party did not want to divert resources away from the election to run a local nomination race.

The Conservative Party's rules and procedures for candidate nominations allow party officials to alter or suspend rules if a general election is called, and Goodridge's appointment was made on the first day of the campaign.

An unsigned and anonymous letter from an unknown number of board members for Fort McMurray's Conservative Party Riding Association said they were "blindsided" and "appalled" when Erin O'Toole appointed Goodridge to be the candidate. The unnamed members claimed there were "outstanding and credible candidates" interested in running for the position, and a nomination race could be completed in as little as one week.

People's Party of Canada candidate Shawn McDonald said during a campaign event in Fort McMurray that he left the Conservative Party because he was one of these candidates when the appointment was announced. Yurdiga endorsed McDonald instead of Goodridge.

== Personal life ==
Goodridge was born and raised in Fort McMurray. She graduated from Father Patrick Mercredi Community High School, and was active in community and school theatre. She spent several years working as a political adviser in Alberta's oil sands. She is fluent in French and holds a Bachelor of Arts degree from University of Alberta's Campus Saint-Jean. Goodridge was 38 weeks pregnant with her first son when she ran in the 2021 Canadian federal election.

== Electoral results ==
=== 2025 federal election ===
2025 Canadian federal election: Fort McMurray—Cold Lake
Party	Candidate	Votes	%	±%	Expenditures
Conservative	Laila Goodridge	39,649	80.15	+12.34	$12,464.97
Liberal	Kaitlyn Staines	7,193	14.54	+7.47	$3,488.06
New Democratic	You-Ju Choi	1,337	2.70	–7.42	none listed
People's	Alan Clarke	896	1.81	–10.89	$8,200.24
Green	Brian Deheer	290	0.59	–0.39	none listed
Independent	Kulbir Chawla	101	0.20	–	none listed
Total valid votes/expense limit		49,466	99.35	–	$159,294.88
Total rejected ballots		325	0.65	–0.10	
Turnout		49,791	61.99	+5.82	
Eligible voters		80,326			
Conservative hold		Swing		–	
Source: Elections Canada

=== 2021 federal election ===
2021 Canadian federal election: Fort McMurray—Cold Lake
Party	Candidate	Votes	%	±%	Expenditures
Conservative	Laila Goodridge	29,242	67.77	–12.09	$31,149.63
People's	Shawn McDonald	5,481	12.70	+9.42	$18,993.62
New Democratic	Garnett Robinson	4,377	10.14	+4.49	none listed
Liberal	Abdifatah Abdi	3,060	7.09	–2.42	$6,898.58
Maverick	Jonathan Meyers	479	1.11	–	$17,740.22
Green	Brian Deheer	423	0.98	–0.72	$45.65
Veterans Coalition	Hughie Shane Whitmore	88	0.20	–	none listed
Total valid votes/expense limit		43,150	99.25	–	$136,793.95
Total rejected ballots		327	0.75	+0.25	
Turnout		43,477	56.17	–8.50	
Eligible voters		77,398			
Conservative hold		Swing		–	
Source: Elections Canada

=== 2019 general election ===
2019 Alberta general election: Fort McMurray-Lac La Biche
Party	Candidate	Votes	%	±%
United Conservative	Laila Goodridge	9,836	66.33	+2.63
New Democratic	Jane Stroud	3,635	24.51	-8.79
Alberta Party	Jeff Fafard	857	5.78	–
Alberta Independence	Mark Grinder	271	1.83	–
Green	Brian Deheer	230	1.55	+0.45
Total		14,829	99.36	–
Rejected, spoiled and declined		95	0.64	–
Eligible electors / turnout		25,622	58.25	–
United Conservative notional hold		Swing		5.73
Source(s) Source: "60 - Fort Mcmurray-Lac La Biche, 2019 Alberta general election". officialresults.elections.ab.ca. Elections Alberta. Alberta. Chief Electoral Officer (2019). 2019 General Election. A Report of the Chief Electoral Officer. Volume II (PDF) (Report). Vol. 2. Edmonton, Alta.: Elections Alberta. pp. 269–274. ISBN 978-1-988620-12-1. Change is based on re-distributed results from the 2015 Alberta general election.

=== 2018 by-election ===
Alberta provincial by-election, July 12, 2018: Fort McMurray-Conklin Upon the resignation of Brian Jean on March 5, 2018
Party	Candidate	Votes	%	±%
United Conservative	Laila Goodridge	2,689	67.02	+0.84
New Democratic	Jane Stroud	1,149	28.64	-2.15
Alberta Party	Sid Fayed	103	2.57	–
Liberal	Robin Le Fevre	42	1.05	-1.99
Green	Brian Deheer	29	0.72	–
Total valid votes		4,012	99.50	–
Rejected, spoiled and declined		20	0.50	-0.40
Turnout		4,032	32.59	-11.85
Eligible electors		12,370		
United Conservative notional hold		Swing		+1.50
Source(s) Elections Alberta. "Election results".

^ UCP change is compared to combined Wildrose and Progressive Conservative

=== 2015 general election ===
2015 Alberta general election: Grande Prairie-Wapiti
Party	Candidate	Votes	%	±%
Progressive Conservative	Wayne Drysdale	6,229	35.57	-16.06
New Democratic	Mary Dahr	5,062	28.90	+19.60
Wildrose	Laila Goodridge	4,175	23.84	-10.84
Alberta Party	Rory Tarant	2,048	11.69	
Total		17,514	100.00	
Rejected, spoiled, and declined		77		
Eligible electors / turnout		37,445	46.98	+4.41
Progressive Conservative hold		Swing		-17.55
Source(s) "Grande Prairie-Wapiti".
