= Fort McMurray—Cold Lake =

Federal electoral district in Alberta, Canada

Alberta electoral district
- Interactive map of riding boundaries from the 2025 federal election. Points indicate the communities of Fort McMurray and Cold Lake.

Federal electoral district
- Legislature: House of Commons
MP
Laila Goodridge
Conservative
- District created: 2013
- First contested: 2015
- Last contested: 2025
- District webpage: profile, map

Demographics
- Population (2011): 101,538
- Electors (2019): 78,157
- Area (km²): 147,412
- Pop. density (per km²): 0.69
- Census division(s): Division No. 12, Division No. 16, Division No. 17
- Census subdivision(s): Wood Buffalo, Cold Lake, Bonnyville (part), Lac La Biche, Opportunity (part), Cold Lake, Wabasca, Fort McKay, Wabasca, Beaver Lake

Fort McMurray—Cold Lake is a federal electoral district in Alberta, Canada, that has been represented in the House of Commons of Canada since 2015. It was created in 2012, mostly from the more urbanized portion of Fort McMurray—Athabasca (78%) combined with a portion of Westlock—St. Paul (22%).

The new riding consists of the Regional Municipality of Wood Buffalo, the city of Cold Lake, and Lac La Biche County. It also contains CFB Cold Lake and most of the Athabasca oil sands.

== Demographics ==
Panethnic groups in Fort McMurray—Cold Lake (2011−2021)
Panethnic group	2021		2016		2011	
Panethnic group	Pop.	%	Pop.	%	Pop.	%
European (Note: Statistic includes all persons that did not make up part of a visible minority or an indigenous identity.)	67,020	61.34%	69,860	63.9%	71,100	70.03%
Indigenous	19,855	18.17%	17,835	16.31%	16,845	16.59%
Southeast Asian (Note: Statistic includes total responses of "Filipino" and "Southeast Asian" under visible minority section on census.)	7,565	6.92%	6,245	5.71%	3,120	3.07%
African	5,115	4.68%	4,550	4.16%	2,230	2.2%
South Asian	5,105	4.67%	5,245	4.8%	4,255	4.19%
East Asian (Note: Statistic includes total responses of "Chinese", "Korean", and "Japanese" under visible minority section on census.)	1,105	1.01%	1,650	1.51%	930	0.92%
Middle Eastern (Note: Statistic includes total responses of "West Asian" and "Arab" under visible minority section on census.)	1,960	1.79%	2,385	2.18%	1,485	1.46%
Latin American	780	0.71%	1,025	0.94%	1,140	1.12%
Other/Multiracial (Note: Statistic includes total responses of "Visible minority, n.i.e." and "Multiple visible minorities" under visible minority section on census.)	755	0.69%	540	0.49%	415	0.41%
Total responses	109,265	99.18%	109,320	99.17%	101,525	99.99%
Total population	110,163	100%	110,230	100%	101,538	100%
Notes: Totals greater than 100% due to multiple origin responses. Demographics based on 2012 Canadian federal electoral redistribution riding boundaries.

== Riding associations ==
Riding associations are the local branches of political parties:

Party	Association name	CEO	HQ city
Conservative	Fort McMurray--Cold Lake Conservative Association	Ronald R. Young	Cold Lake
Liberal	Fort McMurray--Cold Lake Federal Liberal Association	David G. Johnson	Winnipeg, Manitoba
New Democratic	Fort McMurray--Cold Lake Federal NDP Riding Association	Tom Boyce	Edmonton
People's	Fort McMurray--Cold Lake - PPC Association	Darren L. Katerynych	Wood Buffalo

== Members of Parliament ==
This riding has elected the following members of the House of Commons of Canada:

Parliament	Years	Member	Party
Fort McMurray—Cold Lake; Riding created from Fort McMurray—Athabasca and Westlock—St. Paul
42nd	2015–2019	David Yurdiga	Conservative
43rd	2019–2021	David Yurdiga	Conservative
44th	2021–2025	Laila Goodridge	Conservative
45th	2025–present	Laila Goodridge	Conservative

== Election results ==
View source data.
Graph of election results in Fort McMurray—Cold Lake (minor parties that never got 2% of the vote or didn't run consistently are omitted)

=== 2023 representation order ===
2025 Canadian federal election
Party	Candidate	Votes	%	±%	Expenditures
Conservative	Laila Goodridge	39,649	80.15	+12.34	$12,464.97
Liberal	Kaitlyn Staines	7,193	14.54	+7.47	$3,488.06
New Democratic	You-Ju Choi	1,337	2.70	–7.42	none listed
People's	Alan Clarke	896	1.81	–10.89	$8,200.24
Green	Brian Deheer	290	0.59	–0.39	none listed
Independent	Kulbir Chawla	101	0.20	–	none listed
Total valid votes/expense limit		49,466	99.35	–	$159,294.88
Total rejected ballots		325	0.65	–0.10	
Turnout		49,791	61.99	+5.82	
Eligible voters		80,326			
Conservative hold		Swing		–	
Source: Elections Canada

2021 federal election redistributed results
Party	Vote	%
Conservative	29,394	67.81
People's	5,506	12.70
New Democratic	4,385	10.12
Liberal	3,066	7.07
Green	424	0.98
Others	570	1.32

=== 2013 representation order ===
2021 Canadian federal election
Party	Candidate	Votes	%	±%	Expenditures
Conservative	Laila Goodridge	29,242	67.77	–12.09	$31,149.63
People's	Shawn McDonald	5,481	12.70	+9.42	$18,993.62
New Democratic	Garnett Robinson	4,377	10.14	+4.49	none listed
Liberal	Abdifatah Abdi	3,060	7.09	–2.42	$6,898.58
Maverick	Jonathan Meyers	479	1.11	–	$17,740.22
Green	Brian Deheer	423	0.98	–0.72	$45.65
Veterans Coalition	Hughie Shane Whitmore	88	0.20	–	none listed
Total valid votes/expense limit		43,150	99.25	–	$136,793.95
Total rejected ballots		327	0.75	+0.25	
Turnout		43,477	56.17	–8.50	
Eligible voters		77,398			
Conservative hold		Swing		–	
Source: Elections Canada

2019 Canadian federal election
Party	Candidate	Votes	%	±%	Expenditures
Conservative	David Yurdiga	40,706	79.85	+19.29	$53,655.81
Liberal	Maggie Farrington	4,848	9.51	–18.85	$40,627.13
New Democratic	Matthew Gilks	2,883	5.66	–2.09	$14.10
People's	Matthew Barrett	1,674	3.28	–	$8,678.57
Green	Brian Deheer	865	1.70	+0.13	none listed
Total valid votes/expense limit		50,976	99.50	–	$133,281.68
Total rejected ballots		258	0.50	+0.17	
Turnout		51,234	64.67	+3.84	
Eligible voters		79,222			
Conservative hold		Swing		+19.07	
Source: Elections Canada

2015 Canadian federal election
Party	Candidate	Votes	%	±%	Expenditures
Conservative	David Yurdiga	28,625	60.56	–11.95	$85,375.56
Liberal	Kyle Harrietha	13,403	28.36	+17.57	$77,417.78
New Democratic	Melody Lepine	3,663	7.75	–5.38	$18,491.32
Green	Brian Deheer	743	1.57	–2.00	$7.50
Libertarian	Scott Berry	552	1.17	–	$715.09
Christian Heritage	Roelof Janssen	280	0.59	–	$9,136.23
Total valid votes/expense limit		47,266	99.67	–	$260,378.41
Total rejected ballots		158	0.33	–	
Turnout		47,424	60.83	–	
Eligible voters		77,960			
Conservative hold		Swing		–14.76	
Source: Elections Canada

2011 federal election redistributed results
Party	Vote	%
Conservative	18,601	72.51
New Democratic	3,367	13.13
Liberal	2,768	10.79
Green	916	3.57

== See also ==
- List of Canadian electoral districts
- Historical federal electoral districts of Canada
