= Rob Anders =

Canadian politician (born 1972)

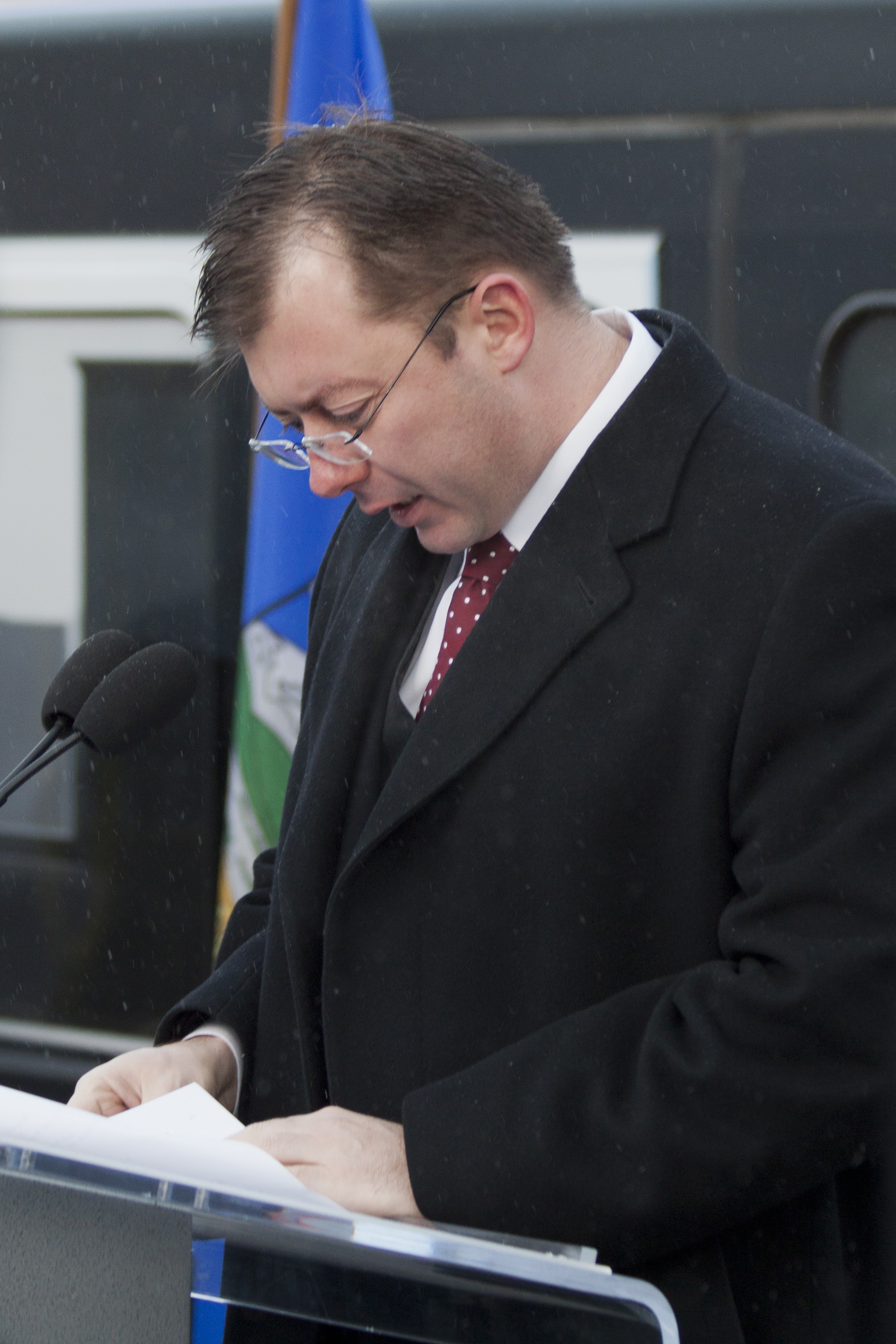

Member of Parliament for Calgary West
- In office June 2, 1997 – August 4, 2015
- Preceded by: Stephen Harper
- Succeeded by: Riding abolished

Personal details
- Born: Robert J. Anders; April 1, 1972 (age 54) Winnipeg, Manitoba, Canada
- Party: Conservative (federal, 2003–present); Wildrose Independence Party of Alberta (provincial, 2022–present)
- Other political affiliations: Reform (1997–2000); Canadian Alliance (2000–2003); Wildrose Party; Solidarity Movement of Alberta (2023)
- Profession: Lobbyist

Robert J. Anders (born April 1, 1972) is a former Canadian politician. He represented the riding of Calgary West from 1997 until 2015 and was a founding member of the Conservative Party of Canada.

On April 12, 2014, Anders was defeated by former provincial minister Ron Liepert for the Conservative nomination in Calgary Signal Hill, which included the bulk of his former riding, for the next federal election.

On September 20, 2014, Anders was defeated for a second time in an attempt to gain the nomination in Bow River by Brooks mayor Martin Shields.

== Early life ==
Anders was born in Winnipeg, Manitoba. He graduated from the University of Calgary with a Bachelor of Arts degree in political science. At the time of his first election in 1997 he served as the director of Canadians Against Forced Unionism.

== Parliamentary career ==
Anders was first elected as the Reform Party MP for Calgary West in 1997, at age 25. The seat had been vacated when the former MP for the riding, Stephen Harper, resigned in 1996. It was expected that Anders would run in a by-election, but the 1997 election was called earlier than expected.

=== Bills introduced ===
In March 2003 Anders introduced Bill C-414 as a private members' bill. It was entitled "An Act to amend the Special Economic Measures Act (no foreign aid to countries that do not respect religious freedom)." The purpose of the bill was to stop Canadian government from spending the foreign aid budget in countries that did not allow for religious freedom.

Anders introduced Bill C-570 on January 29, 2014, which would amend the criminal code to provide for mandatory minimum sentences for rape.

=== 36th Parliament (1997–2000) ===
Anders was elected as a member of the Reform Party (1997–2000) and converted to the Canadian Alliance in 2000.

Anders served in several different critic roles in opposition. First as critic of the Senate from June 16, 1998, to 1999 as well as associate critic for Human Resource Development from his first election to July 31, 2000. In August 2000 he was appointed associate critic for Citizenship and Immigration.

Along with fellow newly elected MPs Jason Kenney, Monte Solberg, Rahim Jaffer and advisor Ezra Levant, Anders was part of an up-and-coming group of young Reformers which pundits dubbed the "Snack Pack" due to their relative youth - all aged under 30; and girth.

=== 37th Parliament (2001–2004) ===
On June 18, 2001, he became associate critic for National Defence, until appointed critic for Civil Preparedness from Jan 22, 2004 until the 2004 election.

Over time Anders has served in several leadership roles on parliamentary committees. In the 37th Canadian Parliament he was the vice-chair of the Subcommittee on National Security of the Standing Committee on Justice, Human Rights, Public Safety and Emergency Preparedness.

Anders was the sole parliamentarian to vote against making Nelson Mandela an honorary citizen of Canada in 2001, which prevented the act from passing unanimously. He defended his actions by stating that Mandela was a communist and a terrorist, causing widespread criticism. As a result, during the next two federal elections, Anders was the target of a mostly unsuccessful non-partisan "Vote Out Rob Anders" campaign in his riding, but his popular vote percentage increased in every federal election since he was first elected in the 1997 Canadian federal election.

Anders was a supporter of Stephen Harper's successful 2002 bid for the leadership of the Canadian Alliance, providing significant assistance with the campaign's phone-banking.

=== 38th Parliament (2004–2005) ===
In the next parliament Anders became the co-chair of the Scrutiny of Regulations Committee.

In December 2005, Anders used public funds to send pamphlets to residents in Richmond, British Columbia, a constituency far removed from his own. The leaflets caused bewilderment for including a survey question about "homosexual sex marriage" in a flyer otherwise addressing crime and crystal meth abuse.

=== 39th Parliament (2006–2008) ===
In the 39th Canadian Parliament, after the Conservatives came to power, he was elected chair of the Standing Committee on Veterans Affairs.

=== 40th Parliament (2008–2011) ===
In the 40th Canadian Parliament he had three different committee leadership jobs: vice-chair of the Government Operations and Estimates Committee, vice-chair of Subcommittee on Agenda and Procedure of the Standing Committee on Government Operations and Estimates and co-chair of Library of Parliament Committee.

Anders has been a consistent critic of the human rights record of the People's Republic of China. He has described the PRC as "the worst human-rights abuser in the world," and compared the 2008 Beijing Olympics to the 1936 Berlin Olympics. He argued that "China is the wrong choice to host the Games... I absolutely 100% think it compares to the Berlin Olympics in 1936." Anders highlights that the fact that Falun Gong practitioners are not allowed to participate in the Olympics is comparable with Adolf Hitler's issue with Jewish participation in the 1936 Berlin Olympics." Anders has also said that no Canadian politician should attend the games, nor should any Canadian athletes be used as "propaganda tools." His comments were criticized by local Chinese trade association as well as fellow Calgary Tory MP Deepak Obhrai, who disclaimed Anders "was speaking as an individual and his comments are not reflective of government policy."

In February 2010, nineteen members of Anders' Calgary West riding association resigned en masse, citing interference from the Conservative Party. The 32 member board had been planning to ask Conservative Party members at the riding's upcoming annual general meeting whether they wanted to hold a nomination contest. The party's national council intervened, saying it had already declared Anders as the candidate for the next federal election, and threatened to take control of the annual general meeting of the constituency association. The resignations brought the total number of board members who had resigned over the course of one year to twenty-four.

In 2010, in a card supporting Canadian troops, Anders wrote: "When in doubt, pull the trigger".

=== 41st Parliament (2011–2015) ===
After the 2011 Canadian election, Anders served as a member of the Veterans Affairs Committee, the Industry, Science and Technology Committee and the Committee for the Scrutiny of Regulations.

Anders' decision to become involved in the newly formed Wildrose Alliance Party of Alberta has generated controversy, as the Wildrose Alliance Party had hoped to defeat the ruling Progressive Conservative Party of Alberta in the province's 2012 election. Ron Liepert, Alberta's Minister of Energy, accused Anders of campaigning against him.

In March 2012, Anders was removed from the Veterans Affairs Committee following controversial comments in response to arriving late, texting, and falling asleep at a committee meeting (including calling his accusers NDP "hacks", and claiming that they praise Vladimir Putin). He was reassigned to the House–Senate Standing Joint Committee on Scrutiny of Regulations. In 2011 Anders began to lobby for the government to stop funding the CBC.

In July 2012, Anders opposed his own party and criticized Treasury Board President Tony Clement for funding a visitors' centre honouring to Norman Bethune, a Canadian physician who died while performing emergency medicine for the Chinese resistance against the Japanese occupation of China. According to Anders, "You don't need taxpayer money to go ahead and memorialize somebody who was a fan of the biggest killer in human history [Mao Zedong]", referring to Bethune's communist ideals, although Bethune had died ten years before Mao took power.

In September and October 2012, fellow Conservative Party members disassociated themselves from Anders' belief that New Democratic Party leader Thomas Mulcair had "hastened the death" of former NDP leader Jack Layton by encouraging an election while being in questionable health.

In October 2012, Anders attracted some controversy by calling Bill C279, a private member's bill that would amend the Canadian Human Rights Act and hate crime section of the Criminal Code to include "gender identity" and "gender expression" as grounds for discrimination, a "bathroom bill".

On December 6, 2013, Anders spoke out after the death of Nelson Mandela, saying "If you are looking for another perspective you may be interested in the obituary that David Horowitz wrote for the Freedom Center".

Prime Minister Stephen Harper has indicated his support of Anders, stating that "Rob is a true reformer and a true conservative. He has been a faithful supporter of mine and I am grateful for his work."

== Nomination challenges ==
Before the nomination race he ultimately lost, Anders defeated several high-profile challengers for the local Conservative nomination.

In 1997, despite his relative youthfulness, Anders was already a veteran political organizer, and was able to win a hotly contested nomination in one of the safest Reform ridings in Canada.

In 2000 he defeated MLA Jocelyn Burgener for the Canadian Alliance nomination. Before the 2004 federal election Anders was challenged by future Alberta Premier Allison Redford. Redford's campaign was run by Ron Liepert, who would later challenge Anders for the new Calgary Signal Hill constituency.

In 2007 Anders was re-nominated by the Conservative party without a challenger. This led to a court challenge, which initially rescinded the decision and called for a new nomination. This decision was overturned on appeal, and Anders was the candidate in the 2008 Canadian Federal Election.

In 2010 Anders was challenged again, but successfully defeated Donna Kennedy-Glans, who was elected an MLA in 2012.

Ahead of the 42nd general election, Anders ran for the Conservative nomination in Calgary Signal Hill, essentially a reconfigured version of Calgary West. However, he was defeated by former provincial cabinet minister Ron Liepert. Anders had characterized the nomination contest as a fight for the party's soul. He was rebuked by the party for making misleading phone calls that left the impression they were coming from Liepert's campaign.

After losing the nomination race for Calgary Signal Hill, Anders decided to contest for the nomination in the new electoral district of Bow River, a mostly rural riding east of Calgary. Anders moved into the district in order to present himself as a resident of the district but he faced a challenge from the mayor of the City of Brooks, Martin Shields; former Rocky View County reeve Rolly Ashdown; and an economics professor from Calgary's Mount Royal University, Gerard Lucyshyn. All have been long-time residents of the district.

On September 20, 2014, Anders lost the nomination for Bow River to Shields. His entry in the race for Bow River caused resentment amongst the other candidates who felt that Anders had parachuted into the riding after losing the nomination race in Calgary Signal Hill.

== Post-parliamentary life ==
Anders serves as president of Firearms Institute for Rational Education. In 2016, he traveled to Arizona to support the campaign to elect Donald Trump as President of the United States.

== Provincial politics ==
At the provincial level, Anders is a member of the Wildrose Party in Alberta and publicly renewed his membership in the wake of the December 2014 defection of 9 of its MLAs, including party leader Danielle Smith, to the governing Progressive Conservatives. Anders expressed interest in running in the Wildrose party's leadership election to choose a successor to Smith after she crossed the floor to join the ruling Progressive Conservatives, however, on January 23, 2015, the Wildrose executive announced that Anders was not qualified to run as he did not meet the minimum 6 month membership requirement and that the party would not be issuing a waiver to permit him to be a candidate.

Since 2022, Anders has served on the Board of Governors of the Wildrose Independence Party as a Governor at Large.

In May 2023, Anders was involved in the creation of a new political party, the Solidarity Movement of Alberta.

== Alleged tax evasion ==
In 2020, the National Post reported that Anders had been charged by the Canada Revenue Agency for tax evasion. Most of the five charges that were laid dated to the period of 1997 to 2015, when he was a member of parliament. Anders was scheduled to face trial on tax evasion charges on October 25, 2021. On June 6, 2022, the CBC reported that all tax evasion charges against Rob Anders had been stayed.

== Electoral record ==
Anders has faced high-profile opponents. In 1997 he defeated Dave Bronconnier, who later became the Mayor of Calgary. In 2000 he defeated Jim Silye, a former Reform MP who was now running for the PCs.

2011 Canadian federal election
Party	Candidate	Votes	%	±%	Expenditures
Conservative	Rob Anders	39,996	62.20	+4.84	$83,426
Liberal	Janice Kinch	11,379	17.68	-4.22	$33,609
New Democratic	Shawna Knowles	6,666	10.36	+4.01	
Green	Anna Wagner	6,068	9.43	-1.72	$15,556
Marxist–Leninist	André Vachon	233	0.36	+0.11	
Total valid votes/Expense limit		64,346	100.00	–	$102,535
Total rejected ballots		338	0.52	+0.15	
Turnout		64,684	63.01	+2.05	
Eligible voters		102,657	–	–	

2008 Canadian federal election
Party	Candidate	Votes	%	±%	Expenditures
Conservative	Rob Anders	34,579	57.36	-1.35	$73,112
Liberal	Jennifer Pollock	13,204	21.90	-0.22	$38,919
Green	Randall Weeks	6,722	11.15	+0.88	$7,103
New Democratic	Teale Phelps Bondaroff	3,832	6.35	-1.94	$7,402
Independent	Kirk Schmidt	1,790	2.96	–	$15,857
Marxist–Leninist	André Vachon	155	0.25	+0.06	
Total valid votes/Expense limit		60,282	100.00	–	$96,909
Total rejected ballots		221	0.37	+0.08	
Turnout		60,503	60.96	-8.98	
Conservative hold		Swing		-0.6	

2006 Canadian federal election
Party	Candidate	Votes	%	±%	Expenditures
Conservative	Rob Anders	38,020	58.71	+2.81	$47,434
Liberal	Jennifer Pollock	14,328	22.12	-7.15	$61,930
Green	Danielle Roberts	6,653	10.27	+2.65	$200
New Democratic	Teale Phelps Bondaroff	5,370	8.29	+1.81	$2,960
Canadian Action	Tim Cayzer	265	0.41	-0.15	$2,356
Marxist–Leninist	André Vachon	125	0.19	+0.04	$16
Total valid votes		64,761	100.00		
Total rejected ballots		191	0.29	-0.04	
Turnout		64,952	69.94	+2.42	

2004 Canadian federal election
Party	Candidate	Votes	%	±%	Expenditures
Conservative	Rob Anders	31,322	55.90	+1.86	$66,962
Liberal	Justin Thompson	16,402	29.27	+11.12	$37,297
Green	Danielle Roberts	4,274	7.63	+5.24	$593
New Democratic	Tim Patterson	3,632	6.48	+2.68	$2,317
Canadian Action	James S. Kohut	315	0.56	–	$551
Marxist–Leninist	André Vachon	87	0.16	–	$46
Total valid votes		56,032	100.00		
Total rejected ballots		184	0.33	+0.13	
Turnout		56,216	67.52	+5.65	

2000 Canadian federal election
Party	Candidate	Votes	%	±%	Expenditures
Alliance	Rob Anders	33,222	54.04	+2.25	$54,150
Progressive Conservative	Jim Silye	13,259	21.57	+4.15	$26,369
Liberal	Frank Bruseker	11,181	18.18	-7.05	$15,745
New Democratic	Greg Klassen	2,350	3.82	+0.04	$1,540
Green	Evan Osenton	1,456	2.36	+1.09	$1,069
Total valid votes		61,468	100.00		
Total rejected ballots		122	0.20	-0.04	
Turnout		61,590	61.87	-3.00	

1997 Canadian federal election
Party	Candidate	Votes	%	±%	Expenditures
Reform	Rob Anders	24,878	51.79	-0.32	$55,330
Liberal	Dave Bronconnier	15,277	25.23	-1.44	$65,590
Progressive Conservative	Sergei Scurfield	9,594	17.42	+1.70	$43,365
New Democratic	Michael Kozakavich	2,105	3.78	+1.75	$1,506
Green	Jack Locke	557	1.27	+0.68	$1,210
Natural Law	Frank Haika	293	0.47	-0.37	$1,149
Total valid votes		52,704	100.00		
Total rejected ballots		128	0.24		
Turnout		52,832	64.87		

== Activism ==
Anders has devoted his time to a variety of conservative causes. Some of these include lobby groups and think tanks such as Focus on the Family, the Canada Family Action Coalition, and to several causes opposing the Government of China's policies regarding Tibet and Falun Gong. Before being elected he worked for the Republican Party on the 1994 Senate campaign of Jim Inhofe in Oklahoma as a professional heckler, which earned him the label of "a foreign political saboteur" from CNN.
