= Gregoire Lake 176A =

Coordinates: 56°26′37″N 111°10′41″W

- Indian reserve
- Gregoire Lake Indian Reserve No. 176A
- Location in Alberta
- First Nation: Fort McMurray
- Treaty: 8
- Country: Canada
- Province: Alberta
- Specialized municipality: Wood Buffalo

Area
  - Total: 67.4 ha (167 acres)

Population (2016)
  - Total: 130
  - Density: 190/km^{2} (500/sq mi)
- Time zone: UTC−06:00 (Alberta Time)

Gregoire Lake 176A is an Indian reserve of the Fort McMurray First Nation in Alberta, located within the Regional Municipality of Wood Buffalo. In the 2016 Canadian Census, it recorded a population of 130 living in 43 of its 49 total private dwellings.
