= 2015 Wildrose Party leadership election =

Canadian political party leadership election

- Date: March 28, 2015
- Convention: Sheraton Cavalier, Calgary
- Resigning leader: Danielle Smith
- Won by: Brian Jean
- Ballots: 1
- Candidates: 3
- Entrance fee: $20,000
- Spending limit: $30,000

The 2015 Wildrose Party leadership election was triggered December 17, 2014, following the decision by leader Danielle Smith and eight other MLAs to leave the Wildrose Party and cross the floor to join the ruling Progressive Conservative Association of Alberta (PCs). The party announced the next day that it would appoint an interim leader and hold an election to choose a permanent leader in 2015. Former Conservative Party of Canada Member of Parliament Brian Jean was elected leader over two other candidates on March 28, 2015.

Under the party's constitution, within 15 days of Smith's resignation, it had to set a date for party members to choose a new permanent leader. Smith tendered her resignation on the morning of December 17, 2014. In a letter to the party's executive, Smith recommended that party members vote on a "reunification resolution" to merge with the PCs as soon as possible, a course of action that the executive rejected.

The party's constitution also stipulates that the leadership election had to be held between three and nine months after the position becomes open, in this case between March and September 2015.

Each candidate had to pay a non-refundable $20,000 deposit and receive endorsement signatures from 250 party members.

The party executive announced on January 23, 2015, that the election was to be held on June 6, 2015, and that party members will be able to vote in person at venues around the province or by mail-in ballot; results were to be announced at the Coast Plaza Hotel in Calgary.

Voting was by means of a ranked ballot(Instant-runoff vote). Originally, voters were required to rank all three candidates. However, due to objections, this was changed to allow voters to rank either one, two, or all three candidates. (the ranking of the third was actually not necessary - the back-up preferences would be used only if the first choice was eliminated, and after the first choice was eliminated, that would leave just two in the running and one or the other would have majority in the very next vote count to win the contest.)

However, due to the likelihood of an early provincial election, the date of the leadership vote was moved up with the vote to be conducted by a telephone ballot in a 12-day period from March 16 to 28, 2015, with results announced at the Sheraton Cavalier in Calgary.

Brian Jean was declared elected, having received a majority of the vote on the First Count.

== Timeline ==
- April 23, 2012: The Wildrose Party under Smith wins 17 seats in the 2012 provincial election, up from zero in the 2008 election and four at dissolution, and forms the official opposition for the first time.
- March 20, 2014: Premier Alison Redford resigns as leader of the PCs following an expense scandal.
- September 6, 2014: In the Progressive Conservative Association of Alberta leadership election Jim Prentice is elected leader.
- September 15, 2014: Prentice is sworn in as premier.
- October 27, 2014: Four by-elections are held, all of which are won by the PCs.
- October 28, 2014: As a result of the by-election losses, Smith asks the party to conduct a leadership review.
- November 2, 2014: Rimbey-Rocky Mountain House-Sundre MLA Joe Anglin leaves the Wildrose caucus to sit as an independent. The remaining members of caucus unanimously pass a resolution asking Smith to withdraw her request for a leadership review; Smith agrees.
- November 15, 2014: At the party's Annual General Meeting, members vote 148–109 against adopting a policy resolution, endorsed by Smith and approved in principle the previous year, to recognize "equal rights for everyone, regardless of race, religion, sexual orientation, or any other differences." Instead, the party kept the current policy, which generally commits it to "recognize that all Albertans have equal rights, privileges and responsibilities."
- November 24, 2014: Innisfail-Sylvan Lake MLA Kerry Towle and Little Bow MLA Ian Donovan leave the Wildrose Party and join the PCs.
- December 17, 2014: Nine Wildrose Party MLAs, including leader Danielle Smith and House Leader Rob Anderson cross the floor to join the PCs; Smith tenders her resignation as Wildrose leader and ask the party executive to hold a vote of the party's rank and file on merging Wildrose and the PC Party. The Wildrose executive rejects Smith's proposal and pledges to hold a leadership election in the new year.
- December 22, 2014: The party names Heather Forsyth to be interim leader until the leadership election can be held.
- December 23, 2014: The Speaker of the Legislative Assembly of Alberta, Gene Zwozdesky, declares that the Wildrose Party will retain official opposition status.
- January 2, 2015: Deadline for the Wildrose executive to set a date for the election of a new leader. Party announces that the election will be sometime between March 17 and September 17 and that "further details with respect to the exact dates, rules and voting procedures will be delivered to all members on or before January 23, 2015."
- January 23, 2015: Deadline for party to announce rules and process for leadership election. Party announces June 6, 2015, date for leadership election and rules.
- January 26, 2015: Nomination period opens.
- February 20, 2015: Linda Osinchuk announces her candidacy.
- February 22, 2015: Party holds its members assembly; party president Jeff Callaway announces that the party executive will try to move up the leadership election to the end of March due to the likelihood of an early provincial general election.
- February 26, 2015: New election date and voting process announced.
- March 7, 2015: Deadline for candidates to submit $20,000 deposit and nomination signatures from 250 party members.
- March 16, 2015: Telephone voting begins.
- March 28, 2015: Telephone voting ends at 3:00 pm MT; new leader expected to be announced in Calgary at approximately 5:30 pm.

== Declared candidates ==
=== Drew Barnes ===
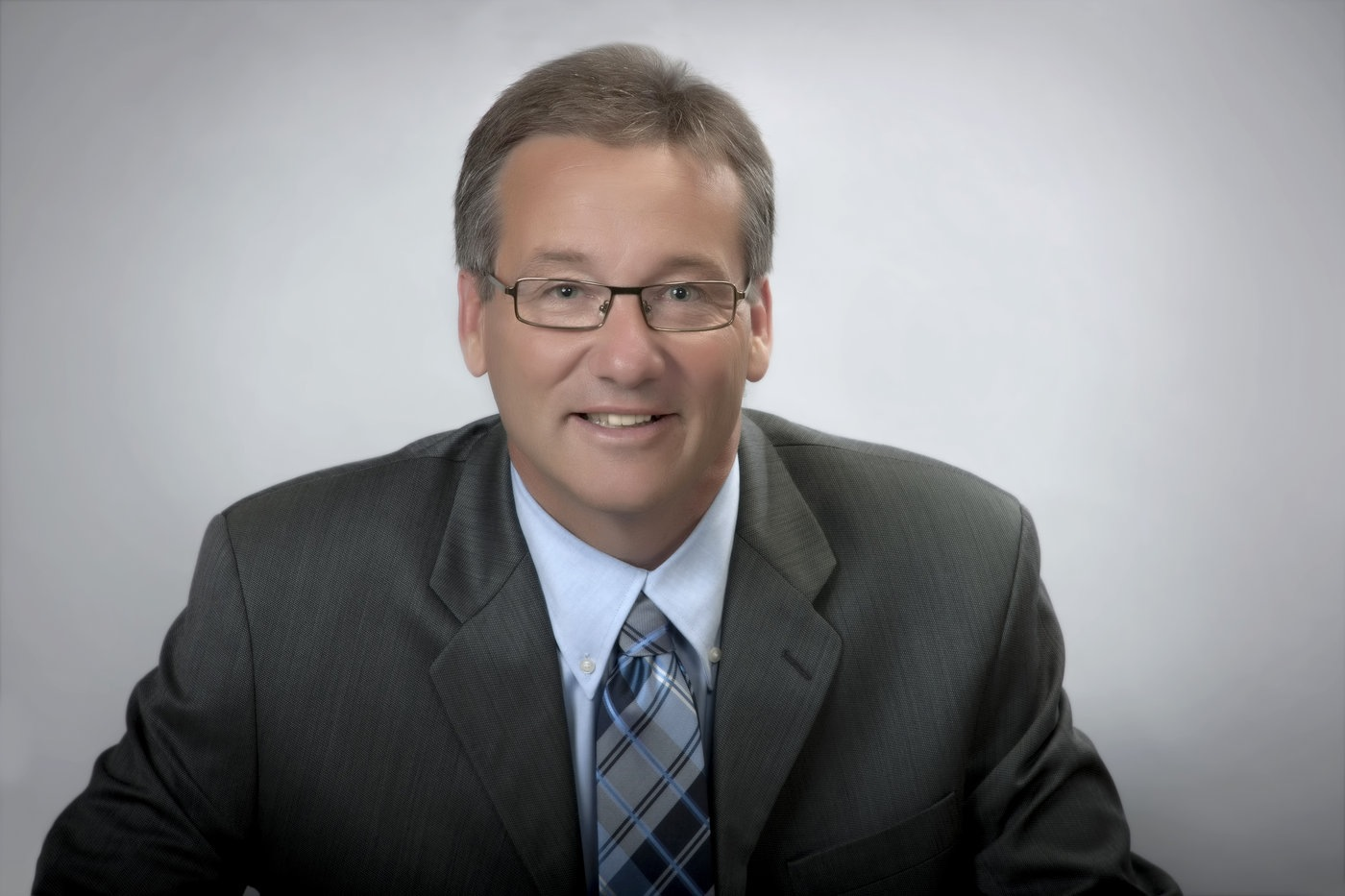
Barnes in 2013

Background

MLA (Cypress-Medicine Hat 2012–present), realtor and businessman by trade.

Date declared: February 26, 2015
Support from provincial caucus members:
Support from federal Members of Parliament:
Support from former provincial caucus members:
Other prominent supporters:
Policies:

=== Brian Jean ===
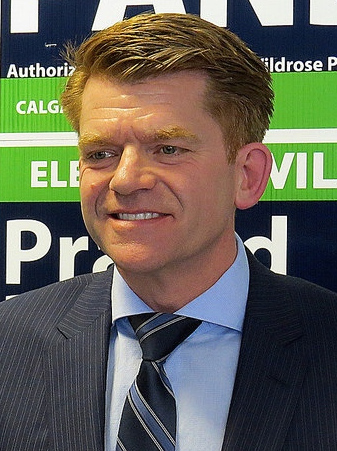
Jean in 2015

Background

Lawyer and former Conservative MP (Athabasca, 2004-2006; Fort McMurray—Athabasca, 2006-2014), Parliamentary Secretary to the Minister of Transport, Infrastructure and Communities (2006-2011).

Date declared: February 25, 2015
Support from provincial caucus members:
Support from federal Members of Parliament:
Support from former provincial caucus members:
Other prominent supporters: Wildrose candidates Derek Fildebrandt (Strathmore-Brooks), a former spokesman for the Canadian Taxpayers Federation who had been touted as a prospective leadership candidate; Kathy Macdonald (Calgary-Mackay-Nose Hill); Hardyal Singh Mann (Calgary-McCall); Kathy Rondeau (Stony Plain); Wayne Anderson (Highwood); Bill Jarvis (Calgary–South East); Darryl Boisson (Lesser Slave Lake); Jaye Walter (Spruce Grove-St. Albert); Travis Olson (Athabasca-Redwater); Leela Aheer (Chestermere-Rocky View); Chris Kemp-Jackson (Calgary-Glenmore); Gerard Lucyshyn (Calgary West); Jason Nixon (Rimbey-Rocky Mountain House-Sundre); Jae Shim (Calgary-Hawkwood); Jeremy Nixon (Calgary-Klein); Todd Loewen (Grand Prairie–Smoky)
Policies: Wants to "clean up" the health care system and deal with alleged financial mismanagement in the provincial government.

=== Linda Osinchuk ===
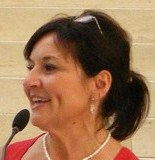
Osinchuk in 2009

Background

Former mayor of Strathcona County (2010-2013), Wildrose nominee for Sherwood Park in the next election, registered nurse by profession.

Date declared: February 26, 2015
Support from provincial caucus members:
Support from federal Members of Parliament:
Support from former provincial caucus members:
Other prominent supporters: Wildrose candidates Sharon Smith (Leduc-Beaumont) and Jaye Walter (Spruce Grove-St. Albert)
Policies: Supports fiscal responsibility but also supports Gay Straight Alliances in schools and inclusion of LGBT people in society.

== Disqualified ==
- Rob Anders, Conservative MP (Calgary West 1997–2015), initially told the Calgary Herald he has "no inclination at this stage" to run for leader, later told the Calgary Sun that he was considering standing as a candidate. Wildrose president Jeff Callaway suggested Anders may not meet the eligibility requirement to be a candidate as he had not been a party member for the required six month minimum prior to the vote. On January 23, the party executive announced that Anders was disqualified from running because he was not a member as of January 10, 2015, and that no waiver will be given allowing him to run. On February 11, 2015, the party's executive committee issued a statement that after reviewing Anders's application and interviewing him, it had again decided he was ineligible to run.

== Declined ==
- Derek Fildebrandt, former Alberta director of the Canadian Taxpayers Federation, is supporting Brian Jean.
- Blake Richards, Conservative MP (Wild Rose 2008–present)
- Shayne Saskiw, MLA (Lac La Biche-St. Paul-Two Hills, 2012–present), Wildrose House Leader. On March 12, 2015, Saskiw, one of the five Wildrose MLAs who did not cross the floor to join the PCs, announced that while he had considered running for the leadership he was disillusioned with politics and would not be running for re-election in the next general election.
- Pat Stier, MLA (Livingstone-Macleod 2012–2019)
- Jeff Willerton, 2009 Wildrose leadership candidate and author of "Fix Canada".

== Results ==
First Ballot
Candidate	Votes	%
Brian Jean	4,792	54.8
Drew Barnes	3,502	40.0
Linda Osinchuk	444	5.1
Total	8,738	100

Turnout was 34.5%

Brian Jean was declared elected, having received a majority of the vote on the First Count.
