= David Yurdiga =

Canadian politician

Member of Parliament for Fort McMurray—Cold Lake Fort McMurray—Athabasca (2014-2015)
- In office June 30, 2014 – September 20, 2021
- Preceded by: Brian Jean
- Succeeded by: Laila Goodridge

Personal details
- Born: March 26, 1964 (age 62) Lac la Biche, Alberta, Canada
- Party: PPC (2021), Conservative (2014-2021, 2022-)
- Profession: Consultant

David Yurdiga (born March 26, 1964) is a former Canadian politician who served as a Member of Parliament (MP) from 2014 to 2021.

== Political career ==
Yurdiga entered politics in 2007 when he was acclaimed to Athabasca County's council as a representative of the hamlet of Grassland. He was named deputy reeve in 2008 and then served as reeve from 2009 to 2013.

On January 10, 2014, Brian Jean announced he was resigning as the Conservative Party's Member of Parliament for the riding Fort McMurray—Athabasca to return to private life in Fort McMurray. Yurdiga resigned from Athabasca County's council after party members selected Yurdiga to replace Jean. Yurdiga was elected during the 2014 by-election. In the 2015 federal election, he was elected to the newly formed riding of Fort McMurray-Cold Lake and re-elected in 2019.

Yurdiga was appointed as the party's critic for Northern Affairs by interim Conservative Party Leader Rona Ambrose on November 20, 2015. He held the position until August 30, 2017, when Conservative Party Leader Andrew Scheer appointed Cathy McLeod to the position. Yurdiga was unharmed during the 2014 shootings at Parliament Hill.

Yurdiga subsequently endorsed Pierre Poilievre in the 2022 Conservative leadership election. He endorsed Peter MacKay during the 2020 Conservative Party of Canada leadership election. He endorsed Kellie Leitch during the 2017 Conservative Party of Canada leadership election.

=== Political positions ===
Yurdiga joined the rest of the Conservative caucus as a vocal supporter of pipeline construction and oil sands production.

He was a critic of gun control legislation in Canada. In March 2021, he launched a failed petition to ban MPs from mentioning the term "assault rifle" in the House of Commons, telling Fort McMurray Today that the term "is a scare tactic used by the current government to demonize all guns.”

He pushed for more supports for people with episodic disabilities, such as multiple sclerosis. He also partnered with Green Party leader Elizabeth May in lobbying for the fast-tracking of a cystic fibrosis medication that, at the time, had yet to be approved for use in Canada.

His votes on social issues were mixed throughout his political career. Yurdiga voted in favour of banning sex-selective abortion in Canada. He also opposed the legalization of medical assistance in dying (MAID) in Canada.

A flyer from Yurdiga's office sent to constituents was mocked on social media because it warned Prime Minister Justin Trudeau was planning to legalize recreational cannabis in Canada. Constituents pointed out Trudeau had never kept his support for cannabis legalization a secret.

In 2021, Yurdiga voted against a bill banning conversion therapy after originally voting in favour of banning the practice during second reading of the bill. He claimed his constituency office had received more than 900 emails and texts that “expressed concerns about parental rights since the bill was introduced," but offered no proof these messages existed. He said he wanted the practice banned, but felt the definition of conversion therapy offered by the Liberal Party of Canada was "broad."

At the same time, Yurdiga supported adding gender identity and gender expression to the Canadian Human Rights Act's list of prohibited grounds of discrimination. In 2016, he supported removing bans on same-sex marriage from official party policy in 2016.

=== Public image as a politician ===
Yurdiga struggled with public speaking when he was first elected. Over time, Yurdiga became more confident in his public speaking and was a popular guest at functions hosted by multicultural groups in Fort McMurray.

But his early struggles with public speaking caused embarrassing moments at public events that were reported by local media. In 2014, Yurdiga confused India and Pakistan when he was asked to give a speech at a ceremony celebrating India's independence. He blamed the gaffe on "inaccurate information" he was given. On election night during the 2015 Canadian federal election, Yurdiga thanked local voters for re-electing Stephen Harper as prime minister, even though Justin Trudeau had already been declared the winner that evening. He later said he meant voters in the riding hoped Harper would be re-elected as prime minister.

Yurdiga was criticized by local media, constituents and his opponents during elections for skipping debates and public forums. Yurdiga said previous commitments during the 2014 by-election and a family health emergency during the 2015 general election kept him from attending most election events. His campaign blamed injuries from a car accident during the 2019 election for keeping Yurdiga away from traditional campaign activities.

During the 2015 campaign, a campaign volunteer confirmed to CJOK-FM's MyMcMurray.com that Yurdiga never intended to attend forums or debates, even before the family medical emergency happened. The volunteer added Yurdiga's campaign team never confirmed attendance with organizers of any of those events.

Yurdiga's Liberal opponent in 2014 and 2015, Kyle Harrietha, portrayed him as an outsider who was ignorant of Fort McMurray and called out Yurdiga for avoiding public events. All of his opponents in the 2019 election criticized him for avoiding all-candidate events.

=== COVID-19 mandates and resignation ===
Yurdiga's constituency office in Cold Lake was vandalized in January 2021 when someone spray painted "COVID lie" on the building. Yurdiga told the Cold Lake Sun he empathized with the frustrations of the person responsible for the vandalism. He also said he was following Alberta's COVID-19 restrictions, but did not agree with all of them.

In August 2021 Yurdiga called legislation mandating COVID-19 vaccinations for public servants "a tyrannical idea" and criticized Quebec's vaccine passport program. Later that month he announced he would not run for re-election, despite being named the party's official candidate in January 2021. A spokesperson for the Conservative Party of Canada said Yurdiga cited health problems as his reason for stepping down.

When the election campaign began, Yurdiga endorsed the People's Party of Canada and the party's candidate for Fort McMurray-Cold Lake, Shawn McDonald. He also donated $1,500 to McDonald's campaign.

Yurdiga did not endorse his Conservative successor, Laila Goodridge, but endorsed the re-election of Lakeland Conservative MP Shannon Stubbs on Facebook. McDonald claimed Yurdiga was forced out for criticizing a COVID-19 vaccine mandate for all government employees.

== Personal background ==
Yurdiga studied power engineering at a technical school in Alberta. He worked at the Eco-Bay Mine in Nunavut, sold industrial chemicals and safety equipment out of Fort McMurray in the early 1990s, then started a consulting and property management business in Lac La Biche.

A Conservative Party biography of Yurdiga said he took over the family farm in Grassland in 2005 and raised organic beef cattle using methods taught to him by his father.

He is married. He has a son, daughter and grandchildren.

On February 16, 2021, a Fort McMurray man was charged with leaving threatening voicemail messages against Yurdiga and the staff at his constituency office. The man, Brad Love, had a history of hate crime and harassment convictions against different politicians, media outlets and religious groups in Canada. Love was found not guilty of threatening Yurdiga but was given a 24-month probationary sentence for threatening a staff member.

== Honours ==
Ribbon	Description	Notes
	Queen Elizabeth II Diamond Jubilee Medal for Canada	2012: David Yurdiga was awarded the Diamond Jubilee Medal in commemoration of the Diamond Jubilee of Elizabeth II.

== Electoral record ==
2019 Canadian federal election: Fort McMurray—Cold Lake
Party	Candidate	Votes	%	±%	Expenditures
Conservative	David Yurdiga	40,706	79.85	+19.29	$53,655.81
Liberal	Maggie Farrington	4,848	9.51	–18.85	$40,627.13
New Democratic	Matthew Gilks	2,883	5.66	–2.09	$14.10
People's	Matthew Barrett	1,674	3.28	–	$8,678.57
Green	Brian Deheer	865	1.70	+0.13	none listed
Total valid votes/expense limit		50,976	99.50	–	$133,281.68
Total rejected ballots		258	0.50	+0.17	
Turnout		51,234	64.67	+3.84	
Eligible voters		79,222			
Conservative hold		Swing		+19.07	
Source: Elections Canada

2015 Canadian federal election: Fort McMurray—Cold Lake
Party	Candidate	Votes	%	±%	Expenditures
Conservative	David Yurdiga	28,625	60.56	–11.95	$85,375.56
Liberal	Kyle Harrietha	13,403	28.36	+17.57	$77,417.78
New Democratic	Melody Lepine	3,663	7.75	–5.38	$18,491.32
Green	Brian Deheer	743	1.57	–2.00	$7.50
Libertarian	Scott Berry	552	1.17	–	$715.09
Christian Heritage	Roelof Janssen	280	0.59	–	$9,136.23
Total valid votes/expense limit		47,266	99.67	–	$260,378.41
Total rejected ballots		158	0.33	–	
Turnout		47,424	60.83	–	
Eligible voters		77,960			
Conservative hold		Swing		–14.76	
Source: Elections Canada

Canadian federal by-election, June 30, 2014: Fort McMurray—Athabasca Resignation of Brian Jean
Party	Candidate	Votes	%	±%	Expenditures
Conservative	David Yurdiga	5,991	46.71	–25.13	$103,194.65
Liberal	Kyle Harrietha	4,529	35.31	+24.89	$103,287.86
New Democratic	Lori McDaniel	1,472	11.48	–1.77	$20,146.42
Green	Brian Deheer	453	3.53	–0.96	$1,189.37
Libertarian	Tim Moen	381	2.97	–	$3,078.39
Total valid votes		12,826	99.74		
Total rejected ballots		34	0.26	–0.20	
Turnout		12,860	14.67	–25.63	
Eligible voters		87,647			
Conservative hold		Swing		–25.01	
Source: Elections Canada

2010 Athabasca County municipal election: Division 7
Candidate	Vote	%
David Yurdiga (X)	Acclaimed	
