= Fort McMurray First Nation =

Cree and Chipewyan band government

- Band No. 468
- ᓂᐢᑕᐚᔮᐤ nistawâyâw
- People: Cree; Chipewyan
- Treaty: Treaty 8
- Headquarters: Fort McMurray
- Province: Alberta

Land
- Other reserves: Clearwater 175; Gregoire Lake 176; Gregoire Lake 176A; Gregoire Lake 176B
- Land area: 32.317 km^{2} (12.478 sq mi)

Population (October 2019)
- On reserve: 284
- On other land: 15
- Off reserve: 571
- Total population: 870

Government
- Chief: Neil Cheecham
- Council: Samantha Wiltzen-Whalen

Tribal Council
- Athabasca Tribal Council

Website
- fmfn468.com

Fort McMurray First Nation (Cree: ᓂᐢᑕᐚᔮᐤ, nistawâyâw) is a Cree and Chipewyan band government located near Fort McMurray, Alberta. It is a member of the Athabasca Tribal Council and a Treaty 8 nation. The Athabasca Tribal Council represents 5 First Nation bands in northeast Alberta. Fort McMurray First Nation is governed by a Chief and two councillors.

The Fort McKay First Nation was originally part of the same Band, but split off in 1942.

== Demographics ==
As of September 2019, the Fort McMurray First Nation had a total population of 870 with 284 members living on reserve and 571 members living off-reserve.

== Reserves ==
Fort McMurray #468 First Nation reserves of ca. 31 km^{2} (12 sq mi) include:

- Clearwater 175 is located on the Clearwater River 11 km (6.8 mi) southeast of Fort McMurray. It is not populated.
- Gregoire Lake 176 located 35 km (22 mi) southeast of Fort McMurray is the largest of the four and the most populated. The population was 191 in 2016 and 274 in 2011.
- Gregoire Lake 176A: the population was 130 in 2016 up from zero in 2011.
- Gregoire Lake 176B: not populated.

Reserves 176, 176A and 176B are located near Anzac on Gregoire Lake approximately 50 km (31 mi) southeast of Fort McMurray)
