= Clearwater 175 =

Coordinates: 56°39′07″N 111°01′06″W

- Indian reserve
- Clearwater Indian Reserve No. 175
- Location in Alberta
- First Nation: Fort McMurray
- Treaty: 8
- Country: Canada
- Province: Alberta
- Specialized municipality: Wood Buffalo

Area
  - Total: 915.4 ha (2,262 acres)
- Time zone: UTC−06:00 (Alberta Time)

Clearwater 175 is an Indian reserve of the Fort McMurray First Nation in Alberta, located within the Regional Municipality of Wood Buffalo. It is 7 kilometres southeast of Fort McMurray.

== History ==
Clearwater Indian Reserve No. 175 was set aside for Paul Cree's Band of Indians under Order in Council P.C. 1570 on 12 May 1921, following surveys in 1915–1916. Although the reserve is now listed as a part of Fort McMurray First Nation, descendants and representatives of the Paul Cree/Clearwater River band have disputed this affiliation, arguing that the band was wrongfully absorbed into the larger structure and should be recognized independently.
