= Beaver Lake Cree Nation =

Canadian First Nation

- Band No. 460
- People: Cree
- Treaty: Treaty 6
- Province: Alberta

Land
- Main reserve: Beaver Lake 131
- Reserve: Blue Quills First Nation Indian Reserve
- Land area: 62.42 km^{2} (24.10 sq mi)

Population (2025)
- On reserve: 439
- On other land: 40
- Off reserve: 1244
- Total population: 1723

Government
- Chief: Gary Lameman
- Council: Cole Gladue; Leonard Jackson; Michael Lameman

Tribal Council
- Tribal Chiefs Ventures Incorporated (fr)

Website
- beaverlakecreenation.ca

The Beaver Lake Cree Nation is a First Nations band government located 105 kilometres (65 mi) northeast of Edmonton, Alberta, representing people of the Cree ethno-linguistic group in the area around Lac La Biche, Alberta, where the band office is currently located. Their treaty area is Treaty 6. The Intergovernmental Affairs office consults with persons on the Government treaty contacts list. There are two parcels of land reserved for the band by the Canadian Crown, Beaver Lake Indian Reserve No. 131 and Blue Quills First Nation Indian Reserve. The latter reserve is shared by six bands; Beaver Lake Cree Nations, Cold Lake First Nations, Frog Lake First Nation, Heart Lake First Nation, Kehewin Cree Nation, Saddle Lake Cree Nation.

A Métis Settlement profile prepared by the Government of Alberta notes that their self defined tribal affiliation is Nîhithaw, or the Woodland Cree or Wood Cree and their linguistic group is Algonquian (Cree). Their population which includes 390 on reserve and 664 off-reserve, is 1,054 according to the Alberta government, as on 2012. Their land base by Reserve Beaver Lake is 131 6,145.3 (hectares) total 6,145.3. There is no chief and council at this time. Other elected representatives include Member of the Legislative Assembly (Lac La Biche-St. Paul-Two Hills) Shayne Saskiw. Brian Jean was the Conservative MP for Fort McMurray—Athabasca, from 2004 until his resignation in 2014; the seat is now vacant.

The colonial governments of Alberta and Canada authorized hundreds of projects or developments representing thousands of individual authorizations related to "oil and gas, forestry, mining and other activities" on Beaver Lake Cree Nation core lands, covering a large portion of northeast Alberta and falling outside the boundaries of any Indigenous reserve including within its territory, the Cold Lake Weapons Range. The Beaver Lake Cree Nation are contesting the "cumulative effect" of these projects and developments on "core traditional territory". On 14 May 2008 the Beaver Lake Cree Nation (BLCN) issued a Statement of Claim against the governments of Alberta and Canada, claiming that "in failing to manage the overall cumulative environmental effects of development on core Traditional Territory", Alberta and Canada have "breached the solemn commitment" in the 9 September 1876 Treaty 6, that the BLCN could "hunt, fish and trap in perpetuity". On 30 April 2013, in Lameman v Alberta, the Court of Appeal of Alberta dismissed Alberta and Canada's appeal of Honourable Madam Justice B.A. Browne's "historic, precedent-setting judgement, "in their entirety", issued in March 2012.

== History ==
The Cree expanded steadily westward from the Hudson-James Bay country. Although the date of arrival of the Cree in the Lac la Biche region is unknown, archaeological evidence in the form of pre-contact pottery indicates that the Cree were in this region in the 1500s. A type of early Cree pottery known as Clearwater Lake Punctate is found regularly in forests in neighbouring Saskatchewan. The Clearwater Lake Punctate, believed to be ancestral to the Cree people, is a ceramic container made during the late prehistoric period, dated to between 250 and 1100 years before present. There is one example in the Canadian Museum of Civilization in Gatineau, Quebec that was found on,

Whitefish Island on Amisk Lake, Saskatchewan in 1950s by Gina Sewap, of the local Cree First Nation. Its distinctive features include an encircling ring of exterior punctates which raise interior bosses, located just below an everted lip. The body of the pot is textured with cord or textile impressions. Pots of this variety are found over a wide area including parts of Eastern Saskatchewan, Manitoba and Northwestern Ontario.

— MCC 1998

Amisk Lake, 45 km west of Beaver Lakes Cree Nation, was on the historic "voyageur highway" that led to the rich Athabaska region. (Amisk is Cree word for beaver.) Examples of this pottery have also been found on Black Fox Island on Lac La Biche and on the shores of Wappau Lake, 90 km north of BLCN. The BLCN included their history on their official webpage and in a legal document, regarding the proposed Enbridge Northern Gateway Project

=== Location on fur trade route ===
Fur trade routes: The Beaver River flows from Beaver Lake near Lac La Biche into Lac Île-à-la-Crosse. The La Biche River flows from Lac La Biche to the Athabasca River. (Note: Cumberland House, founded in 1774, was one of the most important fur trade depots in Canada. To the north the Sturgeon-Weir River led to the Churchill River which led to the Methye Portage and to Lake Athabaska in the rich Athabasca Country to the northwest. See Canadian canoe routes (early).)

The traditional lands of the Beaver Lake Cree Nation were on the historical voyageur route that linked the rich Athabaskan region to Hudson Bay. David Thompson and George Simpson used the fur-trade route via the Beaver River from the main Methye Portage route that reached the Athabasca River. David Thompson founded a trading post on Red Deers Lake, which is now known as Lac La Biche, in 1798-99 and overwintered there, entering copious notes in his diary on the Nahathaway (Cree), their customs, traditions and the Western Boreal forest including this passage,

plenteous supply of white fish and beaver. On the region of the western forest land, at a fine Lake called the Red Deers Lake... at the head of the small streams which feed the Beaver River the southern branch of the Churchill River in October we erected a trading house and passed the winter.

— Thompson 1916:304-5

There was a competition between the Canadian traders of the North West Company and the Hudson's Bay Company.

The Cree, one of the "largest tribes in Canada" was referred to by the early explorers and fur traders as Kristineaux, Kinisteneaux, Kiliston, Kree, Cris and various other names such as Nahathaway. Cree territory extended west from the Hudson-James Bay region to the foot of the Rocky Mountains, and in Alberta, between the north banks of the North Saskatchewan River to Fort Chipewyan. This includes the Beaver, Athabaska and Peace River basins. It is noted in the department of Indian Affairs Annual Reports that Pee-ay-sis of the Lac La Biche band as far north as Great Slave Lake.

Alexander Mackenzie who travelled from Montreal to the Arctic Ocean via the Methy Portage (see map) provided a detailed account of the Kinisteneaux (Cree) in 1789.

An Oblate mission was established at Lac la Biche in 1853 and missionaries "visited the Cree on the South shore of Beaver Lake as early as 1856". The Blue Quill's Indian Residential School (AB-2a) in Lac La Biche, which opened in 1862, was one of the first residential schools in Alberta.

== Treaty 6 and traditional land use ==
Chief Pee-Yas-See-Wah-We-Cha-Koot, also known as Pee-ay-sis, or Pee-ay-sees and Councillor, Pay-Pay-See-See-moo signed the adhesion made to Treaty 6 at Fort Pitt on 9 September 1876, on behalf of the Beaver Lake Band No. 131. Through Treaty 6 the BLCN "were given reserve land and the right to hunt and fish in perpetuity on a much larger piece of territory, their traditional hunting grounds". The essence of the lawsuit is that approximately 17,000 approved oilsands projects will make hunting and fishing impossible for the 920-member band and their future generations.

A report commissioned by Cenovus acknowledged that the Beaver Lake Cree Nation indicated that they practice Traditional Land Use (TLU) activities and that they possess Traditional Ecological Knowledge (TEK). This report contains detailed maps describing sites where "[A]boriginal groups practice traditional trapping, hunting, fishing, berry picking and plant harvesting activities throughout the region. The traditional lands from which these resources are drawn may also contain sites of historical, cultural and spiritual importance.

Whitefish atihkamêk ᐊᑎᐦᑲᒣᐠ (CW) was the staff of life of the Wood Cree and they lived in areas of high whitefish availability, such as Lac la biche.

=== Peayasis ===
Peayasis (also known as François Desjarlais, Piyêsîs, Payasis and Peeaysis, 1824–1899) was a chief of the Peayasis band at Lac La Biche. Peayasis was born to father Joseph Ladoucoeur dit Desjarlais and mother Josephte Suzette Cardinal He married Euphrosine Auger in 1844 and had ten children with her; in 1874, he married Marie Cardinal dit Fleury and had one daughter with her. Later in life, he moved to Battleford and died there in 1899.

While Peayasis was responsible for signing his band to Treaty 6 in 1876, his band did not get a reserve until 1911 when they were assigned land at Beaver Lake.

Peayasis led his band of Lac La Biche in the 1885 Métis Resistance, also known as the North-West Rebellion. Like many other bands that participated in this rebellion, the Lac La Biche band was composed of individuals who had mixed ancestry but culturally identified as First Nations. However, the government suppressed the rebellion and consequently removed those who were in the rebellion from annuity lists. This contributed to some Lac La Biche members leaving treaty to pursue Métis Scrip. Other sources point to the government using scrip money as an incentive for Métis peoples to relinquish their status.

== Oil sands development and Beaver Lake Cree Nation ==
The BLCN is situated in an area geologically rich with oil sands which attracted the early attentions of the industry. However, the nation has waged a defiant campaign against the industry. The governments of Alberta and Canada authorized "300 projects or developments" representing 19,000 individual authorizations" related to "oil and gas, forestry, mining and other activities" on Beaver Lake Cree Nation core lands, covering a large portion of northeast Alberta and falling outside the boundaries of any Indigenous reserve including within its territory, the Cold Lake Weapons Range.

Many environmentalists and activists have celebrated the BLCN's efforts to press for ongoing treaty rights and to preserve their lands from tar sands development. Environmentalist David Suzuki explained that,

BLCN lands cover an area the size of Switzerland and overlap the oil sands. The territory now yields 560,000 barrels of oil a day. Industry wants to raise that to 1.6 million. BLCN land already has 35,000 oil and gas sites, 21,700 kilometres of seismic lines, 4,028 kilometres of pipelines and 948 kilometres of road. Traditional territory has been carved into a patchwork quilt, with wild land reduced to small pieces between roads, pipes and wires, threatening animals like woodland caribou that can't adapt to these intrusions.

— David Suzuki 28 August 2013

The Beaver Lake Cree Nation's opposition to oil and gas exploitation on their lands was prominently featured in the work of Naomi Klein. Klein's bestselling book, This Changes Everything and the Avi Lewis film of the same title both focus on the BLCN's claims with regard to treaties, rights, pollution, and sustainability.

=== Legal Status: Cumulative Ecological Effects ===
A pivotal 1983 article entitled An Ecological Framework for Environmental Impact Assessment in Canada, provided the impetus for the increased use of cumulative effects assessments instead of conventional single-project Environmental Impact Assessments (EIA)s that had been used since the 1970s. As expectations broadened in terms of the scope of assessments, it became apparent that conventional single-project EIAs did not consider environmental degradation, resulting from cumulative effects. (Note: "Deficiencies in both environmental assessment practice and legislation did not provide the mechanisms to move practitioners from the examination of local short-term effects to more far-reaching goals such as sustainable development and maintenance of biodiversity."(CEAA)." Beanlands and Duinker's article "did more to assist cumulative effects assessments practice than any other single effort by ensuring a solid basis on which to conduct any conventional EIA(CEAA).")

The Beaver Lake Cree Nation are contesting the "cumulative effect" of these projects and developments on "core traditional territory". On 14 May 2008 the Beaver Lake Cree Nation (BLCN) issued a Statement of Claim against the governments of Alberta and Canada, claiming that "in failing to manage the overall cumulative environmental effects of development on core Traditional Territory", Alberta and Canada have "breached the solemn commitment" in the 9 September 1876 Treaty 6, that the BLCN could "hunt, fish and trap in perpetuity". On 30 April 2013, in Lameman v Alberta, the Court of Appeal of Alberta dismissed Alberta and Canada's appeal of Honourable Madam Justice B.A. Browne's "historic, precedent-setting judgement, "in their entirety", issued in March 2012.

=== Cold Lake oil sands ===
In 1980, a plant in Cold Lake oil sands was one of just two oil sands plants under construction in Alberta. The Cold Lake oil sands deposit, located near Cold Lake, Alberta, south of the Athabasca oil sands, and directly east of the capital Edmonton, was—as of 2010—one of the largest oil sands deposits in Alberta.

The Province of Alberta owns 81 percent of mineral rights, including oil sands. Mineral rights owned by the Crown are managed by the Alberta Department of Energy on behalf of the citizens of the province. The remaining 19 percent of the mineral rights in the province are held by the Federal Government within Aboriginal reserves, by successors in title to the Hudson's Bay Company, by the railway companies and by the descendants of original homesteaders through rights granted by the Federal Government before 1887. These rights are referred to as "freehold rights".

The federal and provincial government granted "roughly 300 projects with about 19,000 permits" in an area covering a "large portion of northeast Alberta", both "inside and outside" the Beaver Lake First Nation reserve, including the Cold Lake Weapons Range. Most of the grants were made by the province of Alberta but the federal government made 7 of these grants. The Lawyer for the BLCN, Mr. Mildon, explains that BLCN are seeking compensation for losing hunting and fishing rights for the "cumulative effects of oil sands and other industries such as mining and forestry violated their treaty rights, in "past and current projects".

The Beaver Lake Cree are part of a legal dispute over this development on their Treaty lands. In 2008 they issued a declaration, asserting they are the legitimate caretakers of these lands (which includes part of the Cold Lake Air Weapons Range and extends into Saskatchewan). This was followed by a 2012 lawsuit against the governments of Alberta and Canada, alleging that by allowing unfettered development without the band's permission, the governments had violated their treaty rights. The Band has received support in the case from UK-based coop The Co-operative, and the ENGO People & Planet.

=== Kétuskéno Declaration ===
On 14 May 2008, the Beaver Lake Cree released the "Kétuskéno Declaration", "Kawîkiskeyihtâkwan ôma kîyânaw ohci Amiskosâkahikanihk ekanawâpamikoyahk ôhi askiya kâtâpasinahikâteki ôta askîwasinahikanink âhâniskâc ekîpepimâcihowâkehk". asserting their role as caretakers of their traditional territories and started a legal action to: a) enforce recognition of their Constitutionally protected rights to hunt, trap and fish, and b) protect the ecological integrity of their territories. They alleged that development from the oil sands, forestry and the local municipal government infringes upon the First Nation's 1876 treaty rights to hunt, trap and fish Among other resources they foregrounded a native map as evidence.

=== The Co-operative Group ===
The Co-operative Group supported the Beaver Lake Cree Nation as part of its 'Toxic Fuels' campaign "against the alarming global trend of developing carbon-intensive unconventional fossil fuels such as tar sands", which ran from 2008 to 2012. The Co-operative Group became aware of the Beaver Lake Cree Nation concerns regarding oil sands development via the 2008 Kétuskéno Declaration. Colin Baines, Campaigns Manager at The Co-operative Group described the Beaver Lake Cree Nation legal action as "perhaps the best chance we have to stop tar sands expansion". Their involvement and campaigning boosted the national and international profile of the legal challenge. The Co-operative Group sponsored a trip by then-Chief Al Lameman and other senior members of Beaver Lake Cree Nation and their legal counsel to London to officially launch the 'Toxic Fuels' campaign in February 2009. A rally was held outside of the Canadian Embassy in protest of tar sand expansion. This resulted in widespread media attention with major features in The Guardian, Financial Times In July 2009, a team from the BBC accompanied representatives of The Co-operative Group to Beaver Lake to document their visit. The resulting programme entitled 'Tar Wars' was shown in the UK and globally as part of the 'Our World' series. Their visit to Beaver Lake generated significant media coverage in Alberta. In September 2010, then-Chief Lameman returned to the UK as guest of honor for the launch of a major photographic exhibition on the oil sands called 'Tarnished Earth', in which the BLCN legal challenge featured.

The Co-operative Group fund raised or donated over CA$400,000 to support the BLCN legal case. It also funded research into the impacts of oil sands development on the endangered woodland caribou and supported a successful First Nation legal action to force federal government to take action under the Species at Risk Act. It also supported international solidarity campaigning, for example sponsoring a youth exchange with UK student campaigning organization People & Planet in July 2011.

UK-based companies like BP and Shell and UK investors are very active in the Athabasca oil sands. The Co-operative Asset Management, then part of the Co-operative Group, cited the Beaver Lake Cree Nation and "litigation brought by local communities, increasingly affected by pollution, deforestation and wildlife disturbance, claiming breaches of the treaty rights protecting their traditional livelihoods" in shareholder resolutions tabled at the 2010 AGMs of BP and Shell. The Co-operative Group in the United Kingdom is the world's largest consumer co-operative. The Co-operative Group worked with Drew Mildon, of Woodward and Company law firm out of Victoria as legal counsel for the BLCN.

== See also ==
- The Canadian Crown and Indigenous peoples of Canada
