= Beaver Lake 131 =

Beaver Lake 131 Amiskosâkahikanihk
- Location of the Beaver Lake 131 reserve of the Beaver Lake First Nation
- Coordinates: 54°40′07″N 111°52′17″W
- Country: Canada
- Province: Alberta
- Census division: Division No. 12
- Federal electoral district: Fort McMurray—Athabasca

Government
  - Type: First Nations Council
  - Chief: Germaine Anderson
  - Councillor: Gary Lameman
  - Councillor: Curtis Gladue
  - Councillor: Charlene Cardinal
- Elevation: 577 m (1,893 ft)
- Time zone: UTC−06:00 (Alberta Time)
- Area code: 780
- Highways: Highway 55; Highway 36; Highway 881
- Website: www.beaverlakecreenation.ca

Beaver Lake 131 is an Indian reserve in Alberta, Canada, of the Beaver Lake Cree Nation.

== Bibliography ==
- "2012 Metis Settlement Profile" (PDF), Government of Alberta, archived from the original (PDF) on 25 March 2013
