= Gregoire Lake 176 =

Coordinates: 56°24′46″N 111°08′58″W

- Indian reserve
- Gregoire Lake Indian Reserve No. 176
- Location in Alberta
- First Nation: Fort McMurray
- Treaty: 8
- Country: Canada
- Province: Alberta
- Specialized municipality: Wood Buffalo

Area
  - Total: 2,231.9 ha (5,515 acres)

Population (2016)
  - Total: 191
  - Density: 8.56/km^{2} (22.2/sq mi)
- Time zone: UTC−06:00 (Alberta Time)

Gregoire Lake 176 is an Indian reserve of the Fort McMurray First Nation in Alberta, located within the Regional Municipality of Wood Buffalo. It is 35 kilometres southeast of Fort McMurray. In the 2016 Canadian Census, it recorded a population of 191 living in 62 of its 74 total private dwellings.
