= List of senior high schools in Alberta =

This is a list of senior high schools in Alberta accredited by Alberta Education.

The listed schools include public, separate, private and charter high schools, as well as all other organizations accredited to teach high school courses, including outreach schools, adult education schools, distant learning and homeschooling coordination centres, and coordination centres for in place education of hospitalized or incarcerated students. Senior high school in Alberta includes grades 10 to 12.

School name	Location	School type	Grades served	School authority
Academy at King Edward	Edmonton	Public Alternative	3-12	Edmonton Public Schools
Access Academy	Calgary	Private Special Education	7-12	Alberta private schools
ACE Place Learning Centre	Taber	Public Alternative	7-12	Horizon School Division
Acme School	Acme	Public	K-12	Golden Hills School Division
Airdrie Christian Academy	Airdrie	Private Christian	K-12	Alberta private schools
Across the Waters Outreach	Whitecourt	Catholic Alternative	7-12	Living Waters Catholic School Division
Al-Amal Online Academy	Calgary	Public Faith-based	1-12	Prairie Land Regional Division
Al-Mustafa Academy	Edmonton	Private Muslim	K-12	Alberta private schools
AlBaqir Academy	Edmonton	Private Muslim	K-12	Alberta private schools
Alberta Chung Wah School	Calgary	Private, Chinese	10-12	Alberta private schools
Alberta Heritage Language School	Edmonton	Private, Chinese	10-12	Alberta private schools
Alberta School for the Deaf	Edmonton	Public Provincial		Edmonton Public Schools
All Saints High School	Calgary	Catholic	10-12	Calgary Catholic School District
Altario School	Altario	Public	K-12	Prairie Land Regional Division
Alternative High School	Calgary	Public Alternative	10-12	Calgary Board of Education
Alternative Student Programming & Education Network (ASPEN)	Athabasca	Public Alternative		Aspen View Schools
Arise Christian Academy	Calgary	Private Christian	1-12	Alberta private schools
Alix-MAC School	Alix	Public	K-12	Wolf Creek Public Schools
Amiskwaciy Academy	Edmonton	Public Alternative	7-12	Edmonton Public Schools
Archbishop Jordan High School	Sherwood Park	Catholic	9-12	Elk Island Catholic Schools
Archbishop MacDonald High School	Edmonton	Catholic	10-12	Edmonton Catholic School Division
Archbishop O'Leary Catholic High School	Edmonton	Catholic	10-12	Edmonton Catholic School Division
Arden T. Litt Center for Learning (Chamberlain School)	Grassy Lake	Public	PK-12	Horizon School Division
Ardrossan Junior Senior High School	Ardrossan	Public	7-12	Elk Island Public Schools
Ashmont School	Ashmont	Public	K-12	St. Paul Education
Assumption Junior/Senior High School	Cold Lake	Catholic	7-12	Lakeland Catholic Schools
Athabasca Delta Community School	Fort Chipewyan	Public	K-12	Parkland School Division
Aurora Academic Charter Schools	Edmonton	Charter	K-12	Alberta charter schools
Aurora Learning Calgary	Calgary	Private	1-12	Alberta private schools
Aurora Learning Foundation	Sherwood Park	Private	1-12	Alberta private schools
Austin O'Brien Catholic High School	Edmonton	Catholic	10-12	Edmonton Catholic School Division
Avery Outreach School	Lloydminster	Public Alternative	9-12	Lloydminster Public School Division
Banbury Crossroads School	Calgary	Private	K-12	Alberta private schools
Banff Community High School	Banff	Public	7-12	Canadian Rockies Public Schools
Barrhead Composite High School	Barrhead	Public	7-12	Pembina Hills School Division
Barrhead Outreach School	Barrhead	Public Alternative	7-12	Pembina Hills School Division
Bashaw School	Bashaw	Public	K-12	Battle River School Division
Bassano School	Bassano	Public	K-12	Grasslands Public Schools
Battle River Alternative Center for Education (BRACE)	Camrose	Public Alternative		Battle River School Division
Bawlf School	Bawlf	Public	K-12	Battle River School Division
Bearspaw Christian School	Calgary	Private Christian	K-12	Alberta private schools
Beaumont Composite High School	Beaumont	Public	10-12	Black Gold School Division
Beaverlodge Regional High School	Beaverlodge	Public	10-12	Peace Wapiti Public School Division
Beiseker Community School	Beiseker	Public	K-12	Rocky View Schools
Bellerose Composite High School	St. Albert	Public	10-12	St. Albert Public Schools
Bentley School	Bentley	Public	K-12	Wolf Creek Public Schools
Berry Creek Community School	Cessford	Public	ECS-12	Prairie Land Regional Division
Bert Church High School	Airdrie	Public	10-12	Rocky View Schools
Bev Facey Community High School	Sherwood Park	Public	10-12	Elk Island Public Schools
Bill Woodward School	Anzac	Public	6-12	Northland School Division
Bishop Carroll High School	Calgary	Catholic	10-12	Calgary Catholic School District
Bishop McNally High School	Calgary	Catholic	10-12	Calgary Catholic School District
Bishop O'Byrne High School	Calgary	Catholic	10-12	Calgary Catholic School District
Black Gold Home-Based School	Beaumont	Public Alternative	1-12	Black Gold School Division
Black Gold Outreach School	Leduc	Public Alternative	7-12	Black Gold School Division
Black Gold Outreach-Beaumont School	Beaumont	Public Alternative	7-12	Black Gold School Division
Blessed Sacrament Outreach School	Wainwright	Catholic Alternative	10-12	East Central Alberta Catholic Schools
Blessed Sacrament School	Wainwright	Catholic	K-12	East Central Alberta Catholic Schools
Blue Hills Community School	Buffalo Head Prairie	Public	K-12	Fort Vermilion School Division
Bonnyville Centralized High School	Bonnyville	Public	9-12	Northern Lights Public Schools
Bonnyville Outreach School	Bonnyville	Public Alternative	10-12	Northern Lights Public Schools
Bow Valley High School	Cochrane	Public	9-12	Rocky View Schools
Bowden Grandview School	Bowden	Public	K-12	Chinook's Edge Board of Education
Bowness High School	Calgary	Public	10-12	Calgary Board of Education
Boyle School	Boyle	Public	PK-12	Aspen View Schools
Boyle Street Education Centre	Edmonton	Charter	Ages 14–19	Alberta charter schools
Brant Christian School	Brant	Public Faith-based	K-12	Palliser Regional Schools
Braemar School	Edmonton	Public Alternative	8-12	Edmonton Public Schools
Breton High School	Breton	Public	7-12	Wild Rose School Division
BRICK Learning Centre	Ponoka	Public Alternative	10-12	Wolf Creek Public Schools
Bridge Network Outreach School	Grande Prairie	Public Alternative	7-12	Grande Prairie Public School Division
Brooks Composite High School	Brooks	Public	10-12	Grasslands Public Schools
Buck Mountain Central School	Buck Lake	Public	7-12	Wetaskiwin Regional Public Schools
Buffalo Trail Learning Hub	Vermilion	Public Alternative		Buffalo Trail Public Schools
Calgary Academy	Calgary	Private Special Education	K-12	Alberta private schools
Calgary Arts Academy	Edmonton	Charter	K-12	Alberta charter schools
Calgary Chinese Alliance School	Calgary	Private, Chinese	K-12	Alberta private schools
Calgary Chinese Private School	Calgary	Private, Chinese	10-12	Alberta private schools
Calgary Christian School	Calgary	Public Faith-based	PK-12	Palliser Regional Schools
Calgary Classical Academy	Calgary	Charter	K-12	Alberta charter schools
Calgary French and International School	Calgary	Private Special Education	PK-12	Alberta private schools
Calgary German Language School	Calgary	Private	7-12	Alberta private schools
Calgary Mandarin School	Calgary	Private, Chinese-language	10-12	Alberta private schools
Calgary Quest School	Calgary	Private	1-12	Alberta private schools
Calling Lake School	Calling Lake	Public	K-12	Northland School Division
Calmar Secondary Collegiate School	Calmar	Public	7-12	Black Gold School Division
Calvin Christian School	Coalhurst	Private Christian	K-12	Alberta private schools
Cameron Crossing School	Okotoks	Public	10-12	Foothills School Division
Campus EIPS	Sherwood Park	Public Alternative	9-12	Elk Island Public Schools
Canmore Collegiate High School	Canmore	Public	9-12	Canadian Rockies Public Schools
Capstone Engineering Academy	Calgary	Private	1-12	Alberta private schools
Cardinal Collins Academic Centre	Edmonton (City Centre, Clareview, Mill Woods, Westmount)	Catholic Alternative	10-12	Edmonton Catholic School Division
Cardston High School	Cardston	Public	9-12	Westwind School Division
Career and Technology Centre	Calgary	Public	7-12	Calgary Board of Education
Career Pathways Outreach School	Wabasca	Public	10-12	Northland School Division
Carmangay School	Carmangay	Public	7-12	Palliser Regional Schools
Caroline School	Breton	Public	7-12	Wild Rose School Division
Castor Outreach School	Castor	Public Alternative	10-12	Clearview Public Schools
Catholic Central High School	Lethbridge	Catholic	10-12	Holy Spirit Catholic School Division
The Centre for Learning @ Home	Online	Catholic Alternative	1-12	Christ the Redeemer Catholic Schools
Centre High Campus	Edmonton	Public	12	Edmonton Public Schools
CBe-learn	Calgary	Public Alternative	1-12	Calgary Board of Education
Centennial High School	Calgary	Public	10-12	Calgary Board of Education
Central Alberta Christian High School	Lacombe	Private Christian	10-12	Alberta private schools
Central High Sedgewick Public School	Sedgewick	Public	1-12	Battle River School Division
Central Memorial High School	Calgary	Public	10-12	Calgary Board of Education
Charles Spencer High School	Grande Prairie	Public	9-12	Grande Prairie Public School Division
Cherry Coulee Christian Academy	Bow Island	Private Christian	K-12	Alberta private schools
Chestermere High School	Chestermere	Public	10-12	Rocky View Schools
Chesterton Academy of St. Isidore	Sherwood Park	Catholic	9-12	Elk Island Catholic Schools
Chiniki Community College	Mînî Thnî	Private	10-12	Alberta private schools
Chinook High School	Lethbridge	Public	9-12	Lethbridge School Division
Chinook Winds Adventist Academy	Calgary	Private Christian	K-12	Alberta private schools
Christ the King Jr./Sr. High School	Leduc	Catholic	9-12	STAR Catholic Schools
Calgary Islamic School	Calgary	Public Faith-based	K-12	Prairie Rose School Division
Clear Water Academy	Calgary	Private Christian	K-12	Alberta private schools
Coaldale Christian School	Coaldale	Private Christian	K-12	Alberta private schools
Coalhurst High School	Coalhurst	Public	7-12	Palliser Regional Schools
Cochrane High School	Cochrane	Public	9-12	Rocky View Schools
Cold Lake High School	Cold Lake	Public	10-12	Northern Lights Public Schools
Cold Lake Outreach School	Cold Lake	Public Alternative	10-12	Northern Lights Public Schools
College Heights Christian School	Lacombe	Private Christian	K-12	Alberta private schools
Columbia College	Calgary	Private	10-12	Alberta private schools
Columbus Academy	Edmonton	Private	1-12	Alberta private schools
Concordia High School	Edmonton	Private Christian	9-12	Alberta private schools
Conklin Community School	Conklin	Public	K-12	Northland School Division
Connections For Learning	Stony Plain	Public	1-12	Parkland School Division
Consort School	Consort	Public	K-12	Prairie Land Regional Division
Coralwood Adventist Academy	Edmonton	Private Christian	K-12	Alberta private schools
Cornerstone Christian Academy	Kingman	Private Christian	K-12	Alberta private schools
Coronation School	Coronation	Public	K-12	Clearview Public Schools
Coronation Outreach School	Coronation	Public Alternative		Clearview Public Schools
Coulee Collegiate	Medicine Hat	Public Alternative	10-12	Medicine Hat Public School Division
County Central High School	Vulcan	Public	7-12	Palliser Regional Schools
Covenant Canadian Reformed School	Neerlandia	Private Christian	K-12	Alberta private schools
Cremona School	Cremona	Public	K-12	Chinook's Edge Board of Education
Crescent Heights High School (Calgary)	Calgary	Public	10-12	Calgary Board of Education
Crescent Heights High School (Medicine Hat)	Medicine Hat	Public	7-12	Medicine Hat Public School Division
Crossroads Outreach School	Buffalo Lake Metis Settlement	Public Alternative	10-12	Northern Lights Public Schools
Crowsnest Consolidated High School	Coleman	Public	7-12	Livingstone Range School Division
David Thompson High School	Leslieville	Public	7-12	Wild Rose School Division
Daysland School	Daysland	Public	K-12	Battle River School Division
Delburne Centralized School	Delburne	Public	K-12	Chinook's Edge Board of Education
Delia School	Delia	Public	K-12	Prairie Land Regional Division
Delta West Academy	Calgary	Private	K-12	Alberta private schools
Dewberry School	Dewberry	Public	1-12	Buffalo Trail Public Schools
Didsbury High School	Didsbury	Public	9-12	Chinook's Edge Board of Education
Dr. Anne Anderson High School	Edmonton	Public	10-12	Edmonton Public Schools
Dr. E.P. Scarlett High School	Calgary	Public	10-12	Calgary Board of Education
Dr. Folkins Community School	Chauvin	Public	K-12	Buffalo Trail Public Schools
Drayton Valley Outreach School	Drayton Valley	Public Alternative	10-12	Wild Rose School Division
Drumheller Outreach	Drumheller	Public Alternative	10-12	Golden Hills School Division
Drumheller Valley Secondary School	Drumheller	Public	7-12	Golden Hills School Division
Duchess School	Duchess	Public	K-12	Grasslands Public Schools
E2 Academy	Calgary	Private	K-12	Alberta private schools
E.H. Walter School	Paradise Valley	Public	PK-12	Buffalo Trail Public Schools
E.W. Pratt High School	High Prairie	Public	10-12	High Prairie School Division
Eagle Butte High School	Dunmore	Public	10-12	Prairie Rose School Division
Eaglesham School	Eaglesham	Public	K-12	Peace Wapiti Public School Division
Eastglen School	Edmonton	Public	10-12	Edmonton Public Schools
Eastside Christian Academy	Calgary	Private Christian	K-12	Alberta private schools
Eckville Junior/Senior High School	Eckville	Public	7-12	Wolf Creek Public Schools
École Alexandre-Taché	St. Albert	Francophone	5-12	Conseil scolaire Centre-Nord
École Beauséjour	Plamondon	Francophone	PK-12	Conseil scolaire Centre-Est
École Beausoleil	Okotoks	Francophone	K-12	Conseil scolaire FrancoSud
École Boréale	Fort McMurray	Francophone	K-12	Conseil scolaire Centre-Nord
École Camrose Composite High School	Camrose	Public	9-12	Battle River School Division
École de la Rose Sauvage	Calgary	Francophone	7-12	Conseil scolaire FrancoSud
École des Beaux-Lacs	Bonnyville	Francophone	PK-12	Conseil scolaire Centre-Est
École des Fondateurs	Camrose	Francophone	K-12	Conseil scolaire Centre-Nord
École des Hautes-Plaines	Airdrie	Francophone	K-12	Conseil scolaire FrancoSud
École des Quatre-Vents	Peace River	Francophone	PK-12	Conseil scolaire du Nord-Ouest No. 1
École Desrochers	Jasper	Francophone	K-12	Conseil scolaire Centre-Nord
École Héritage	Falher	Francophone	PK-12	Conseil scolaire du Nord-Ouest No. 1
École H.J. Cody High School	Sylvan Lake	Public	9-12	Chinook's Edge Board of Education
École J. H. Picard School	Edmonton	Catholic	K-12	Edmonton Catholic School Division
École La Prairie	Red Deer	Francophone	K-12	Conseil scolaire Centre-Nord
École La Vérendrye	Lethbridge	Francophone	K-12	Conseil scolaire FrancoSud
École Le Ruisseau	Brooks	Francophone	K-12	Conseil scolaire FrancoSud
École Les Cyprès	Medicine Hat	Francophone	K-12	Conseil scolaire FrancoSud
École Mallaig School	Mallaig	Public	K-12	St. Paul Education
École Maurice-Lavallée	Edmonton	Francophone	10-12	Conseil scolaire Centre-Nord
École McTavish Public High School	Fort McMurray	Public	7-12	Fort McMurray Public School District
École Michaëlle-Jean	Edmonton	Francophone	7-12	Conseil scolaire Centre-Nord
École Notre-Dame des Monts	Canmore	Francophone Catholic	K-12	Conseil scolaire FrancoSud
École Notre-Dame des Vallées	Cochrane	Francophone Catholic	K-12	Conseil scolaire FrancoSud
École Notre Dame High School	Bonnyville	Catholic	9-12	Lakeland Catholic Schools
École Nouvelle Frontière	Grande Prairie	Francophone	PK-12	Conseil scolaire du Nord-Ouest No. 1
École Olds High School	Olds	Public	9-12	Chinook's Edge Board of Education
École Plamondon School	Plamondon	Public Alternative	K-12	Northern Lights Public Schools
École Saint-Christophe	Wainwright	Francophone	K-12	Conseil scolaire Centre-Nord
École Sans-Frontières	Lloydminster	Francophone	K-12	Conseil scolaire Centre-Nord
École Secondaire Foothills Composite High School/Alberta High School of Fine Arts	Okotoks	Public	10-12	Foothills School Division
École Secondaire Highwood High School	High River	Public	10-12	Foothills School Division
École Secondaire Le Phare	Calgary	Francophone	7-12	Conseil scolaire FrancoSud
École Secondaire Notre Dame High School	Red Deer	Catholic	10-12	Red Deer Catholic Regional Schools
École St. Joseph	Whitecourt	Catholic	7-12	Living Waters Catholic School Division
Edge School	Calgary	Private	1-12	Alberta private schools
Edgerton Public School	Edgerton	Public	K-12	Buffalo Trail Public Schools
Edison School	Foothills	Private	K-12	Alberta private schools
Edmonton Academy	Edmonton	Private Special Education	K-12	Alberta private schools
Edmonton Christian High School	Edmonton	Public Faith-based	10-12	Edmonton Public Schools
Edmonton Classical Academy	Edmonton	Charter	K-12	Alberta charter schools
Edmonton Islamic Academy	Edmonton	Private Muslim	K-12	Alberta private schools
Education Unlimited Academy	Kingman	Private	K-12	Alberta private schools
Edwin Parr Composite School	Athabasca	Public	7-12	Aspen View Schools
Elder Dr. Francis Whiskeyjack High School	Edmonton	Public	10-12	Edmonton Public Schools
Elk Island Youth Ranch Learning Centre	Lamont	Public Alternative	7-12	Elk Island Public Schools
Elk Point Outreach School	Elk Point	Public Alternative	7-12	St. Paul Education
Elves Adult & Youth Centre	Edmonton	Private Special Education	K-12	Alberta private schools
Emmaus Learning Community	Red Deer	Private Christian	1-12	Alberta private schools
Ernest Manning High School	Calgary	Public	10-12	Calgary Board of Education
F.G. Miller Jr/Sr High School	Elk Point	Public	7-12	St. Paul Education
F.P. Walshe High School	Fort Macleod	Public	6-12	Livingstone Range School Division
Fairview Jr./Sr. High School	Fairview	Public	7-12	Peace River School Division
Father Gerard Redmond Community Catholic School	Spruce Hinton	Catholic	5-12	Evergreen Catholic Schools
Father Lacombe High School	Calgary	Catholic	10-12	Calgary Catholic School District
Father Patrick Mercredi Community High School	Fort McMurray	Catholic	9-12	Fort McMurray Catholic School District
Filipino Language & Cultural School	Edmonton	Private, Filipino	K-12	Alberta private schools
Foothills Academy	Calgary	Private	1-12	Alberta private schools
Foothills Digital School	Okotoks	Public Alternative	10-12	Foothills School Division
Footprints for Learning Society	Airdrie	Private	K-12	Alberta private schools
Foremost School	Foremost	Public	K-12	Prairie Rose School Division
Forest Lawn High School	Calgary	Public	10-12	Calgary Board of Education
Forestburg School	Forestburg	Public	K-12	Battle River School Division
Fort McMurray Composite High School	Fort McMurray	Public	7-12	Fort McMurray Public School District
Fort Saskatchewan Senior High School	Fort Saskatchewan	Public	10-12	Elk Island Public Schools
Fort Vermilion Public School	Fort Vermilion	Public	7-12	Fort Vermilion School Division
Foundations for the Future Charter Academy	Calgary	Charter	K-12	Alberta charter schools
Fox Creek School	Fox Creek	Public	K-12	Northern Gateway Public Schools
Frank Maddock High School	Drayton Valley	Public	9-12	Wild Rose School Division
Frank Spragins High School	Fort McMurray	Public Alternative	8-12	Fort McMurray Public School District
Fusion Collegiate	Calgary	Charter	10-12	Alberta charter schools
Gateway Christian School	Red Deer	Public Faith-based	K-12	Red Deer Public Schools
George McDougall High School	Airdrie	Public	10-12	Rocky View Schools
Georges P. Vanier School	Donnelly	Public	7-12	High Prairie School Division
Glendon School	Glendon	Public	K-12	Northern Lights Public Schools
Glenmary School	Peace River	Catholic	9-12	Holy Family Catholic Division
Gobind Sarvar School	Calgary	Private	1-12	Alberta private schools
Golden Hills Learning Academy	Strathmore	Public Alternative	K-12	Golden Hills School Division
Grand Trunk High School	Lobstick	Public	7-12	Grande Yellowhead Public School Division
Grande Cache Community High School	Grande Cache	Public	9-12	Grande Yellowhead Public School Division
Grande Prairie Composite High School	Grande Prairie	Public	9-12	Grande Prairie Public School Division
Greek Community School	Calgary	Private, Greek	10-12	Alberta private schools
Grimshaw Public School	Grimshaw	Public	K-12	Peace River School Division
Grouard Northland School	Grouard	Public	K-12	Northland School Division
Gus Wetter School	Castor	Public	K-12	Clearview Public Schools
H.A. Kostash School	Smoky Lake	Public	PK-12	Aspen View Schools
Harry Ainlay High School	Edmonton	Public	10-12	Edmonton Public Schools
Harry Collinge High School	Hinton	Public	8-12	Grande Yellowhead Public School Division
Harvest Baptist Academy	Spruce Grove	Private Christian	K-12	Alberta private schools
Hay Lakes School	Hay Lakes	Public	K-12	Battle River School Division
Headway School	Edmonton	Private	K-12	Alberta private schools
Heinsburg Community School	Heinsburg	Public	K-12	St. Paul Education
Henry Wise Wood High School	Calgary	Public	10-12	Calgary Board of Education
Herald School	Medicine Hat	Public Alternative	K-12	Medicine Hat Public School Division
Heritage Christian Academy	Calgary	Private Christian	K-12	Alberta private schools
High Level Public School	High Level	Public	7-12	Fort Vermilion School Division
Hillcrest Christian School	Grande Prairie	Private Christian	K-12	Alberta private schools
Hillside Jr/Sr High School	Valleyview	Public	7-12	Northern Gateway Public Schools
Hilltop High School	Whitecourt	Public	9-12	Northern Gateway Public Schools
Hines Creek Composite School	Hines Creek	Public	K-12	Peace River School Division
Holden Rural Academy	Holden	Charter	7-12	Alberta charter schools
Holy Cross Collegiate	Strathmore	Catholic	K-12	Christ the Redeemer Catholic Schools
Holy Family Catholic School	Waskatenau	Catholic	K-12	Lakeland Catholic Schools
Holy Redeemer Junior Senior Catholic High School	Edson	Catholic	7-12	Living Waters Catholic School Division
Holy Rosary High School	Lloydminster	Catholic	8-12	Lloydminster Catholic School Division
Holy Trinity Academy (Drayton Valley)	Drayton Valley	Catholic	10-12	STAR Catholic Schools
Holy Trinity Academy (Okotoks)	Okotoks	Catholic	10-12	Christ the Redeemer Catholic Schools
Holy Trinity Catholic High School (Edmonton)	Edmonton	Catholic	10-12	Edmonton Catholic School Division
Holy Trinity Catholic High School (Fort McMurray)	Fort McMurray	Catholic	9-12	Fort McMurray Catholic School District
Home Plus Learning Network	Online	Public Alternative	K-12	Prairie Rose School Division
Hope Christian School	Vulcan	Public Faith-based	1-12	Prairie Land Regional Division
Horizon Christian Program	Taber	Public Faith-based	6-12	Horizon School Division
Horizon Heritage Arabic School	Calgary	Private Muslim	10-12	Alberta private schools
Horizon MAP School	Vauxhall	Public Alternative	7-12	Horizon School Division
Horseshoe Crossing High School	Langdon	Public	9-12	Rocky View Schools
Hub Virtual School	Medicine Hat	Public Alternative	K-12	Medicine Hat Public School Division
Hugh Sutherland School	Carstairs	Public	5-12	Chinook's Edge Board of Education
Hughenden School	Hughenden	Public	4-12	Buffalo Trail Public Schools
Hunting Hills High School	Red Deer	Public	9-12	Red Deer Public Schools
Huntsville School	Iron Springs	Public	PK-12	Palliser Regional Schools
Ignite Centre for eLearning	Edmonton	Private, virtual	K-12	Alberta private schools
Immaculate Heart of Mary Catholic High School Outreach	Fort McMurray	Catholic Alternative	7-12	Fort McMurray Catholic School District
Immanuel Christian High School	Lethbridge	Public Faith-based	9-12	Lethbridge School Division
Inner City High School	Edmonton	Private	10-12	Alberta private schools
Innisfail High School	Innisfail	Public	9-12	Chinook's Edge Board of Education
Irma School	Irma	Public	K-12	Buffalo Trail Public Schools
Iron Ridge Secondary Campus	Blackfalds	Public	9-12	Wolf Creek Public Schools
Italian School of Calgary	Calgary	Private, Italian	7-12	Alberta private schools
Ivan Franko Ukrainian School	Edmonton	Private, Ukrainian	7-12	Alberta private schools
J.A. Williams High School	Lac La Biche	Public	9-12	Northern Lights Public Schools
J.C. Charyk Hanna School	Hanna	Public	K-12	Prairie Land Regional Division
J. Percy Page High School	Edmonton	Public	10-12	Edmonton Public Schools
J.R. Robson School	Vermilion	Public	7-12	Buffalo Trail Public Schools
J.T. Foster High School	Nanton	Public	7-12	Livingstone Range School Division
Jack James High School	Calgary	Public	10-12	Calgary Board of Education
James Fowler High School	Calgary	Public	10-12	Calgary Board of Education
Janus Academy Junior/Senior High School	Calgary	Private	1-12	Alberta private schools
Jasper Junior Senior High School	Jasper	Public	7-12	Grande Yellowhead Public School Division
Jasper Place High School	Edmonton	Public	10-12	Edmonton Public Schools
Joane Cardinal-Schubert High School	Calgary	Public	10-12	Calgary Board of Education
John Davidson School	Coaldale	Public	PK-12	Palliser Regional Schools
John G. Diefenbaker High School	Calgary	Public	10-12	Calgary Board of Education
John Maland High School	Devon	Public	10-12	Black Gold School Division
Journeys Learning Academy	Kikino	Public Alternative	10-12	Northern Lights Public Schools
Kinuso School	Kinuso	Public	K-12	High Prairie School Division
Kitscoty Jr/Sr High School	Kitscoty	Public	7-12	Buffalo Trail Public Schools
Koinonia Christian School	Red Deer	Private Christian	K-12	Alberta private schools
L.Y. Cairns School	Edmonton	Public	7-12	Edmonton Public Schools
La Crete Public School	La Crete	Public	7-12	Fort Vermilion School Division
Lac La Biche Outreach School	Lac La Biche	Public Alternative	10-12	Northern Lights Public Schools
Lacombe Composite High School	Lacombe	Public	10-12	Wolf Creek Public Schools
Lacombe Outreach School	Lacombe	Public Alternative	7-12	Wolf Creek Public Schools
Lakeland Christian Academy	Calgary	Private Christian	K-12	Alberta private schools
Lakeside Outreach School	Slave Lake	Public Alternative	10-12	High Prairie School Division
Lamont High School	Lamont	Public	7-12	Elk Island Public Schools
Le Centre francophone d'éducation à distance (CFÉD)	Plamondon	Francophone Alternative	10-12	Conseil scolaire Centre-Est
Learning Store (Blue Quill, Northgate, Whyte, West Edmonton)	Edmonton	Public Alternative	10-12	Edmonton Public Schools
Leduc Composite High School	Leduc	Public	8-12	Black Gold School Division
Lester B. Pearson High School	Calgary	Public	10-12	Calgary Board of Education
Lethbridge Collegiate Institute	Lethbridge	Public	9-12	Lethbridge School Division
Light of Christ Catholic School	Lac La Biche	Catholic	PK-12	Lakeland Catholic Schools
Lighthouse Christian School	Sylvan Lake	Private Christian	K-12	Alberta private schools
Lillian Osborne High School	Edmonton	Public	10-12	Edmonton Public Schools
Lindsay Thurber Comprehensive High School	Red Deer	Public	9-12	Red Deer Public Schools
Living Truth Christian School	Mirror	Private Christian	K-12	Alberta private schools
Living Waters Christian Academy	Spruce Grove	Private Christian	K-12	Alberta private schools
Livingstone School	Lundbreck	Public	K-12	Livingstone Range School Division
Lloyd Garrison School	Berwyn	Public	K-12	Peace River School Division
Lloydminster Comprehensive High School	Lloydminster	Public	9-12	Lloydminster Public School Division
Lomond Community School	Lomond	Public	K-12	Horizon School Division
Lord Beaverbrook High School	Calgary	Public	10-12	Calgary Board of Education
Louis St. Laurent School	Edmonton	Catholic	7-12	Edmonton Catholic School Division
LRSD Pursuits Virtual School	Fort Macleod	Public Alternative		Livingstone Range School Division
Lycée Louis Pasteur	Calgary	Private, French	K-12	Alberta private schools
M.E. LaZerte High School	Edmonton	Public	10-12	Edmonton Public Schools
MAC Islamic School	Edmonton	Private Muslim	K-12	Alberta private schools
Magrath Jr./Sr. High School	Magrath	Public	7-12	Westwind School Division
Mamawi Atosketan Native School	Ponoka	Private Christian	K-12	Alberta private schools
Manning Aurora Composite School	Manning	Public	K-12	Peace River School Division
Mannville School	Mannville	Public	K-12	Buffalo Trail Public Schools
Marwayne Jubilee School	Marwayne	Public	K-12	Buffalo Trail Public Schools
Maskwachees Cultural School	Maskwacis	Private	K-12	Alberta private schools
Master's Academy & College	Calgary	Public Faith-based	K-12	Palliser Regional Schools
Matthew Halton High School	Pincher Creek	Public	7-12	Livingstone Range School Division
Mayerthorpe High School	Mayerthorpe	Public	7-12	Northern Gateway Public Schools
McNally High School	Edmonton	Public	10-12	Edmonton Public Schools
Medicine Hat High School	Medicine Hat	Public	10-12	Medicine Hat Public School Division
Memorial Composite High School	Stony Plain	Public	10-12	Parkland School Division
Menno Simons Community School	Cleardale	Public	K-12	Peace River School Division
Metro Continuing Education	Edmonton	Public Alternative	10-12	Edmonton Public Schools
MHHS Gateway Campus	Pincher Creek	Public Alternative	10-12	Livingstone Range School Division
Milk River Ridge School	Milk River	Public	PK-12	Horizon School Division
Millwoods Christian School	Edmonton	Public Faith-based	K-12	Edmonton Public Schools
Mistassiniy School	Wabasca	Public	7-12	Northland School Division
Monsignor McCoy High School	Medicine Hat	Catholic	10-12	Medicine Hat Catholic Board of Education
Morinville Community High School	Morinville	Catholic	9-12	Greater St. Albert Catholic Schools
Morrin School	Morrin	Public	ECS-12	Prairie Land Regional Division
Mother Margaret Mary Catholic High School	Edmonton	Catholic	10-12	Edmonton Catholic School Division
Mountain View Academy	Calgary	Private	K-12	Alberta private schools
Myrnam Outreach and Homeschool Centre	Myrnam	Public Alternative	4-12	St. Paul Education
National Sport School	Calgary	Public Alternative	8-12	Palliser Regional Schools
Nelson Mandela High School	Calgary	Public	10-12	Calgary Board of Education
New Heights School	Calgary	Private, Special Education	K-12	Alberta private schools
New Myrnam School	Myrnam	Public	K-12	St. Paul Education
New Norway School	New Norway	Public	K-12	Battle River School Division
New Sarepta Community High School	New Sarepta	Public	7-12	Black Gold School Division
Next Step Fort Saskatchewan	Fort Saskatchewan	Public Alternative	8-12	Elk Island Public Schools
Next Step Sherwood Park	Sherwood Park	Public Alternative	8-12	Elk Island Public Schools
Next Step Vegreville	Vegreville	Public Alternative	8-12	Elk Island Public Schools
Noble Central School	Nobleford	Public	PK-12	Palliser Regional Schools
North Point School	Calgary	Private	K-12	Alberta private schools
North Trail High School	Calgary	Public	10-12	Calgary Board of Education
Northern Home Education Centre	La Crete	Public Alternative	K-12	Fort Vermilion School Division
Northland Online School	Online	Public Alternative	K-12	Northland School Division
NorthStar Academy	Red Deer County	Public Faith-based	K-12	Golden Hills School Division
Notre Dame High School	Calgary	Catholic	10-12	Calgary Catholic School District
Notre Dame Collegiate	High River	Catholic	7-12	Christ the Redeemer Catholic Schools
Ohpaho Secondary School	Leduc	Public	8-12	Black Gold School Division
Oilfields School	Diamond Valley	Public	7-12	Foothills School Division
Old Scona Academic High School	Edmonton	Public	10-12	Edmonton Public Schools
Old Sun Community College	Siksika 146	Private	10-12	Alberta private schools
Olds Koinonia Christian School	Bowden	Public Faith-based	K-12	Chinook's Edge Board of Education
Olds Mountain View Christian School	Calgary	Private Christian	K-12	Alberta private schools
Onoway Jr/Sr High School	Onoway	Public	8-12	Northern Gateway Public Schools
Our Lady of Lourdes School	Calgary	Catholic	1-12	Calgary Catholic School District
Our Lady of the Rockies High School	Calgary	Catholic	10-12	Calgary Catholic School District
Our Lady of the Snows Catholic Academy	Canmore	Catholic	K-12	Christ the Redeemer Catholic Schools
Paddle Prairie School	Paddle Prairie	Public	K-12	Northland School Division
Parkland Composite High School	Edson	Public	7-12	Grande Yellowhead Public School Division
Parkview Adventist Academy	Lacombe	Private Christian	10-12	Alberta private schools
Parkland Immanuel Christian School	Edmonton	Private Christian	K-12	Alberta private schools
Parkland School Special Education	Red Deer	Private Special Education	K-12	Alberta private schools
Pathways Alternative School	High Level/La Crete	Public Alternative	10-12	Fort Vermilion School Division
Pathways School	Medicine Hat	Public Alternative	7-12	Medicine Hat Public School Division
Paul Kane High School	St. Albert	Public	10-12	St. Albert Public Schools
Peace Christian Academy	Grimshaw	Private	K-12	Alberta private schools
Peace Learning Connection	Peace River	Public Alternative	K-12	Peace River School Division
Peace River High School	Peace River	Public	9-12	Peace River School Division
Peace Wapiti Academy	Grande Prairie	Public	9-12	Peace Wapiti Public School Division
Penhold Crossing Secondary School	Penhold	Public	9-12	Chinook's Edge Board of Education
Phoenix Academy	Edmonton	Private	7-12	Alberta private schools
Phoenix Education Foundation	Calgary	Private	K-12	Alberta private schools
Picture Butte High School	Picture Butte	Public	7-12	Palliser Regional Schools
Pigeon Lake Regional School	Falun	Public	7-12	Wetaskiwin Regional Public Schools
Pines Alternative School	Red Deer	Public Alternative	9-12	Red Deer Public Schools
Polish Sienkiewicz School	Edmonton	Private, Polish	10-12	Alberta private schools
Ponoka Secondary Campus	Ponoka	Public Alternative	7-12	Wolf Creek Public Schools
Prairie Adventist Christian eSchool	Lacombe	Private Christian	K-12	Alberta private schools
Prairie Christian Academy	Three Hills	Public Faith-based	K-12	Golden Hills School Division
Prairie Land Online Academy	Online	Public Alternative	1-12	Prairie Land Regional Division
Prairie Land Outreach School	Hanna	Public Alternative	10-12	Prairie Land Regional Division
Prairie View Outreach School	High Prairie	Public Alternative	10-12	High Prairie School Division
Progressive Academy	Edmonton	Private	PK-12	Alberta private schools
Providence Christian School	Monarch	Private Christian	K-12	Alberta private schools
Provost Public School	Provost	Public	K-12	Buffalo Trail Public Schools
Queen Elizabeth High School	Calgary	Public	7-12	Calgary Board of Education
Queen Elizabeth High School	Edmonton	Public	10-12	Edmonton Public Schools
R.F. Staples Secondary School	Westlock	Public	7-12	Pembina Hills School Division
Rainbow Lake School	Rainbow Lake	Public	K-12	Fort Vermilion School Division
Raymond High School	Raymond	Public	10-12	Westwind School Division
Red Crow Community College	Cardston	Private	10-12	Alberta private schools
Red Earth Creek School	Red Earth Creek	Public	K-12	Peace River School Division
Redwater School	Redwater	Public	5-12	Sturgeon Public Schools
Renert School	Calgary	Private	K-12	Alberta private schools
Revelation School	Online	Catholic Alternative	10-12	Edmonton Catholic School Division
Rimbey Junior/Senior High School	Rimbey	Public	7-12	Wolf Creek Public Schools
Ridgevalley School	Crooked Creek	Public	K-12	Peace Wapiti Public School Division
Robert Thirsk High School	Calgary	Public	10-12	Calgary Board of Education
Rocky Lake School	Fort Vermilion	Public	K-12	Fort Vermilion School Division
Roland Michener Secondary School	Slave Lake	Public	7-12	High Prairie School Division
Rosemary School	Rosemary	Public	K-12	Grasslands Public Schools
Ross Sheppard High School	Edmonton	Public	10-12	Edmonton Public Schools
RTD Math Academy	Red Deer	Private	7-12	Alberta private schools
Rundle Academy	Calgary	Private Special Education	K-12	Alberta private schools
Rundle College Jr/Sr High School	Calgary	Private	K-12	Alberta private schools
Russian Education Centre	Edmonton	Private, Russian	K-12	Alberta private schools
RVS Community Learning Centre	Airdrie, Chestermere, Cochrane	Public Alternative	10-12	Rocky View Schools
Saint Francis High School	Calgary	Catholic	10-12	Calgary Catholic School District
Salisbury Composite High School	Sherwood Park	Public	10-12	Elk Island Public Schools
Savanna School	Silver Valley	Public	PK-12	Peace Wapiti Public School Division
SCcyber E-Learning Institute	Calgary	Private Online	10-12	Alberta private schools
School of Hope	Online	Catholic Alternative	K-12	East Central Alberta Catholic Schools
Senator Gershaw School	Bow Island	Public	4-12	Prairie Rose School Division
Sexsmith Sedcondary School	Sexsmith	Public	7-12	Peace Wapiti Public School Division
Sir Winston Churchill High School	Calgary	Public	10-12	Calgary Board of Education
Solomon College	Edmonton	Private	10-12	Alberta private schools
South Alberta High School	Online	Public Alternative	10-12	Prairie Rose School Division
South Central High School	Oyen	Public	7-12	Prairie Rose School Division
Spirit River Regional Academy	Spirit River	Public	PK-12	Peace Wapiti Public School Division
Springbank Community High School	Springbank	Public	9-12	Rocky View Schools
Spruce Grove Composite High School	Spruce Grove	Public	10-12	Parkland School Division
Spruce View School	Spruce View	Public	K-12	Chinook's Edge Board of Education
St. Albert Catholic High School	St. Albert	Catholic	10-12	Greater St. Albert Catholic Schools
St. Albert Collegiate	St. Albert	Public Alternative	10-12	St. Albert Public Schools
St. Albert Outreach High School	St. Albert	Public Alternative	10-12	St. Albert Public Schools
St. André Bessette Catholic School	Fort Saskatchewan	Catholic	9-12	Elk Island Catholic Schools
St. Andrew's School	High Prairie	Catholic	ECS-12	Holy Family Catholic Division
St. Anne Academic Centre	Calgary	Catholic	K-12	Calgary Catholic School District
St. Anthony's School	Drumheller	Catholic	K-12	Christ the Redeemer Catholic Schools
St. Augustine School	Ponoka	Catholic	K-12	STAR Catholic Schools
St. Carlo Acutis Catholic High School	Camrose	Catholic	9-12	Elk Island Catholic Schools
St. Francis Xavier High School	Edmonton	Catholic	10-12	Edmonton Catholic School Division
St. Gabriel the Archangel School	Chestermere	Catholic	K-12	Calgary Catholic School District
St. Gabriel Education Centre	St. Albert	Catholic Alternative	10-12	Greater St. Albert Catholic Schools
St. Gabriel School for Diverse Learning	Edmonton	Catholic Alternative	K-12	Edmonton Catholic School Division
St. Isidore Learning Centre	Sherwood Park	Catholic Alternative	1-12	Elk Island Catholic Schools
St. Jerome's School	Vermilion	Catholic	K-12	East Central Alberta Catholic Schools
St. John Bosco Catholic School	Grande Prairie	Catholic	10-12	Grande Prairie and District Catholic Schools
St. John Paul II Catholic School/Faculté St-Jean Paul II	Grande Prairie	Catholic	9-12	Grande Prairie and District Catholic Schools
St. Joseph Catholic High School	Grande Prairie	Catholic	9-12	Grande Prairie and District Catholic Schools
St. Joseph High School	Edmonton	Catholic	10-12	Edmonton Catholic School Division
St. Joseph's Collegiate	Brooks	Catholic	10-12	Christ the Redeemer Catholic Schools
St. Joseph's High School	Red Deer	Catholic	10-12	Red Deer Catholic Regional Schools
St. Luke's Outreach Centre	Brooks, High River, Okotoks	Catholic Alternative	10-12	Christ the Redeemer Catholic Schools
St. Martin De Porres High School	Airdrie	Catholic	10-12	Calgary Catholic School District
St. Mary School	Taber	Catholic	6-12	Holy Spirit Catholic School Division
St. Mary School	Westlock	Catholic	PK-12	Evergreen Catholic Schools
St. Mary's Catholic School	Vegreville	Catholic	7-12	Elk Island Catholic Schools
St. Mary's High School	Calgary	Catholic	10-12	Calgary Catholic School District
St. Michael's School	Bow Island	Catholic	9-12	Holy Spirit Catholic School Division
St. Oscar Romero Catholic High School	Edmonton	Catholic	10-12	Edmonton Catholic School Division
St. Paul Alternate Education Centre	St. Paul	Public Alternative	9-12	St. Paul Education
St. Paul Regional High School	St. Paul	Public	10-12	St. Paul Education
St. Paul's Academy	Online	Catholic Alternative	1-12	Christ the Redeemer Catholic Schools
St. Peter the Apostle Catholic High School	Spruce Grove	Catholic	9-12	Evergreen Catholic Schools
St. Theresa Catholic Learning Centre	Spruce Grove	Catholic Alternative	7-12	Evergreen Catholic Schools
St. Thomas Aquinas School	Provost	Catholic	K-12	East Central Alberta Catholic Schools
St. Thomas More School	Fairview	Catholic	ECS-12	Holy Family Catholic Division
St. Timothy High School	Cochrane	Catholic	7-12	Calgary Catholic School District
STAR Catholic Outreach School	Leduc	Catholic Alternative	10-12	STAR Catholic Schools
STEM Collegiate Canada	Edmonton	Charter	K-12	Alberta charter schools
STEM Innovation Academy	Calgary	Charter	7-12	Alberta charter schools
Stirling School	Stirling	Public	K-12	Westwind School Division
Strathcona Christian Academy	Sherwood Park	Public Faith-based	K-12	Elk Island Public Schools
Strathcona High School	Edmonton	Public	10-12	Edmonton Public Schools
Strathcona-Tweedsmuir School	Okotoks	Private	K-12	Alberta private schools
Strathmore High School	Strathmore	Public	10-12	Golden Hills School Division
Strathmore StoreFront School	Strathmore	Public Alternative	10-12	Golden Hills School Division
Sturgeon Composite High School	Namao	Public	10-12	Sturgeon Public Schools
Sturgeon Learning Centre	St. Albert	Public Alternative	8-12	Sturgeon Public Schools
Summit Trails Online School	Online	Public Alternative	10-12	Rocky View Schools
Summit West Independent School	Okotoks	Private	K-12	Alberta private schools
Sundre High School	Sundre	Public	9-12	Chinook's Edge Board of Education
Sundre Learning Center	Sundre	Public Alternative		Chinook's Edge Board of Education
Sunrise School	Brooks	Public Alternative	6-12	Grasslands Public Schools
Swan Hills School	Swan Hills	Public	K-12	Pembina Hills School Division
Taber Christian High School	Taber	Public Faith-based	9-12	Horizon School Division
Tempo School	Edmonton	Private	K-12	Alberta private schools
The Chinese Academy	Calgary	Private, Chinese	10-12	Alberta private schools
The Chinese Cultural Promotion Society	Edmonton	Private, Chinese	10-12	Alberta private schools
The Father's House Christian School	Morinville	Private Christian	K-12	Alberta private schools
The Gilbertine Academy	Calgary	Private Christian	K-12	Alberta private schools
Third Academy	Rocky View County	Private	7-12	Alberta private schools
Thomas More Academy	Edmonton	Private	1-12	Alberta private schools
Thorhild Central School	Thorhild	Public	PK-12	Aspen View Schools
Thorsby Junior/Senior High School	Thorsby	Public	7-12	Black Gold School Division
Three Hills School	Three Hills	Public	K-12	Golden Hills School Division
Tofield School	Tofield	Public	5-12	Battle River School Division
Trinity Learning Centre	Lethbridge	Catholic	10-12	Holy Spirit Catholic School Division
Trochu Valley School	Trochu	Public	K-12	Golden Hills School Division
Tween Valley Christian School	Taber	Private Christian	K-12	Alberta private schools
Two Hills Mennonite School	Two Hills	Public Faith-based	K-12	St. Paul Education
Two Hills School	Two Hills	Public	K-12	St. Paul Education
Tyndale Christian School	Calgary	Private Christian	K-12	Alberta private schools
Upper Hay River School	High Level	Public	K-12	Fort Vermilion School Division
URSA	Calgary	Private	K-12	Alberta private schools
Vauxhall High School	Vauxhall	Public	7-12	Horizon School Division
Vegreville Composite School	Vegreville	Public	7-12	Elk Island Public Schools
Victoria Park High School	Lethbridge	Public Alternative	9-12	Lethbridge School Division
Victoria School of the Arts	Edmonton	Public Alternative	K-12	Edmonton Public Schools
Viking School	Viking	Public	K-12	Battle River School Division
Villa Spiritus	Derwent	Private Christian	10-12	Alberta private schools
Vilna School	Vilna	Public	PK-12	Aspen View Schools
Vimy Ridge Academy	Edmonton	Public Alternative	10-12	Edmonton Public Schools
Visions West Outreach School	Rocky Mountain House	Public Alternative	10-12	Wild Rose School Division
Vista Virtual School	Calgary	Public Alternative	2-12	Pembina Hills School Division
W.G. Murdoch School	Crossfield	Public	6-12	Rocky View Schools
W.H. Croxford High School	Airdrie	Public	10-12	Rocky View Schools
W.P. Wagner High School	Edmonton	Public	10-12	Edmonton Public Schools
W. R. Myers High School	Taber	Public	9-12	Horizon School Division
Wainwright High School	Wainwright	Public	7-12	Buffalo Trail Public Schools
Walshe Crossroads Campus	Fort Macleod	Public Alternative	10-12	Livingstone Range School Division
Warburg School (K-12)	Warburg	Public	K-12	Black Gold School Division
Warner School	Warner	Public	PK-12	Horizon School Division
Webber Academy	Calgary	Private	PK-12	Alberta private schools
West Central High School	Rocky Mountain House	Public	10-12	Wild Rose School Division
West Country Outreach School	Rimbey	Public Alternative	7-12	Wolf Creek Public Schools
West Island College Calgary	Calgary	Private	K-12	Alberta private schools
Western Canada High School	Calgary	Public	10-12	Calgary Board of Education
Westlock Outreach School	Westlock	Public Alternative	10-12	Pembina Hills School Division
Westmount Charter School	Calgary	Charter	K-12	Alberta charter schools
Westwind Alternate School	Cardston	Public Alternative	9-12	Westwind School Division
Westwood Community High School	Fort McMurray	Public	7-12	Fort McMurray Public School District
Wetaskiwin Composite High School	Wetaskiwin	Public	9-12	Wetaskiwin Regional Public Schools
Wetaskiwin Outreach School	Wetaskiwin	Public Alternative	7-12	Wetaskiwin Regional Public Schools
Wheatland Crossing School	Standard	Public	K-12	Golden Hills School Division
William Aberhart High School	Calgary	Public	10-12	Calgary Board of Education
William E. Hay Outreach Campus	Stettler	Public Alternative		Clearview Public Schools
William E. Hay Stetler Secondary Campus	Stettler	Public	7-12	Clearview Public Schools
Willow Creek Composite High School	Claresholm	Public	7-12	Livingstone Range School Division
Winston Churchill High School	Lethbridge	Public	9-12	Lethbridge School Division
Wolf Creek Education Centre	Ponoka	Public Alternative		Wolf Creek Public Schools
Worsley Central School	Worsley	Public	K-12	Peace River School Division
Yellowhead Koinonia Christian School	Edson	Private Christian	K-12	Alberta private schools
Youngstown School	Youngstown	Public	1-12	Prairie Land Regional Division
Yufeng Chinese School	Calgary	Private, Chinese	1-12	Alberta private schools

== See also ==
- Lists of schools in Canada
