= Public School Boards' Association of Alberta =

Non-profit society in Alberta

The Public School Boards' Association of Alberta (PSBAA) is a not-for-profit society, the members of which can be any public school jurisdiction, or First Nations Education Authority, in Alberta, Canada. The membership criteria for the Association requires a school jurisdiction which provides public education to affirm its support to the Objects of the Association.

== Jurisdictions ==
Twenty-eight of forty-one public school jurisdictions in Alberta belong to the Association as of January, 2026. These jurisdictions are:

- Aspen View Public Schools
- Black Gold School Division
- Buffalo Trail Public Schools
- Canadian Rockies Public Schools
- Edmonton Public Schools
- Fort McMurray Public School District
- Golden Hills School Division
- Grande Prairie Public School Division
- Grande Yellowhead Public School Division
- Grasslands Public Schools
- High Prairie School Division
- Lethbridge School Division
- Medicine Hat Public School Division
- Northern Gateway Public Schools
- Northern Lights Public Schools
- The Northland School Division
- Parkland School Division
- Peace River School Division
- Peace Wapiti Public School Division
- Pembina Hills School Division
- Prairie Land Public School Division
- Prairie Rose Public Schools
- Red Deer Public Schools
- St. Albert Public Schools
- Sturgeon Public School Division
- Wetaskiwin Regional Public Schools
- Wild Rose School Division
- Wolf Creek Public Schools

The main activities of the Association are: advocacy for public school education; leadership development programs for school trustees, system administrators, and citizen advocates for public school education; building and maintaining political relations with the provincial government and the provincial public service; and, research and the dissemination of findings significant to the improvement of public education.

The Association is host of the Public School Boards Council, a representative assembly for school jurisdictions in Alberta, at which assembly the jurisdictions speak about issues of concern to public school education, and do so without relying on the intermediary of a separate corporate entity.

== History ==
The Public School Boards' Association of Alberta was founded in 1989, at a convention held in Edmonton, Alberta.

Presidents in order were:

- Mr. Dick Mather, a trustee of the Edmonton Public School District (1989 - 1991)
- Mr. Gordon Pearcy of Grande Prairie Public School District (1991 - 1992)
- Ms. Deb Poffenroth, of Foothills School Division (1992 - 1994)
- Ms. Anita Dent, of Peace River School Division (1994 - 1996)
- Mr. Dick Chamney, of Buffalo Trail School Division (1996 - 1997)
- Mr. Clyde Blackburn, of Grande Prairie Public School District (1997 - 1999)
- Mr. Don Fleming, of Edmonton Public School District (1999 - 2000)
- Ms. Carolyn Kaiser, of Foothills School Division (2000 - 2001)
- Ms. Joan Trettler, of St. Albert Protestant Separate School District (2001 - 2005)
- Mr. Don Fleming, of Edmonton Public School District (2005 - 2009)
- Ms. Patty Dittrick, of Clearview School Division (2009 - 2013)
- Ms. Arlene Hrynyk, of Northern Lights Public Schools (2013 - 2017)
- Ms. Cathy Hogg of Prairie Rose School Division (2017 - 2021)
- Mr. Dennis MacNeil of Aspen View Public School (2021 - 2025)
- Ms. Lorraine Stewart of Parkland School Division (2025 - Present)

Executive Directors in order were:

- Mr. David King (1990 - 2010)
- Ms. Mary Lynne Campbell (2010 - 2018)
- Mr. Brian Callaghan (2018 - 2020)
- Mr. Troy Tait, Chief Executive Officer (2020 - present)
