= Marjorie Nichols =

Canadian journalist and writer

Marjorie Ann Nichols (1943, Red Deer, Alberta – December 29, 1991, Red Deer, Alberta) was a Canadian political journalist and author. In 1967, at the age of 23, Nichols became the youngest reporter in the Ottawa Press Gallery. In her youth, she was also a nationally ranked speed skater.

== Biography ==
Nichols was born in Red Deer, Alberta and initially raised on an Alberta farm. Nichols' childhood was spent in Red Deer, Alberta, where she graduated from Lindsay Thurber Comprehensive High School in 1962. In 1992, Nichols was posthumously inducted into the school's Hall of Fame, contemporaneously with fellow graduates Roland Michener (former Governor General of Canada) and James L. Foster (former Member of the Alberta Legislative Assembly), among others. In her youth, Nichols was a nationally ranked speed skater, who was an alternate to represent Canada at the 1960 Winter Olympics.

Nichols attended the University of Montana, where she graduated with a degree in journalism. During her undergraduate years, she was awarded a Certificate of Excellence in News Writing by the Hearst Foundation, in relation to her contribution to the national competition of the Hearst Journalism Awards Program. Further, in 1989 the University of Montana recognized Marjorie as an honored alumnus for her journalistic achievements. The Nichols family has established the Marjorie Nichols endowment which serves to bring in notable Canadian journalists to lecture at the university – such lectures have featured the likes of Keith Morrison.

In 1966, Nichols commenced her career in professional journalism as a reporter for the Ottawa Journal. In 1967, at the age of 23, Nichols became the youngest reporter in the Ottawa Press Gallery and its only female member. In 1972, she joined the Vancouver Sun, as its bureau chief in Victoria, British Columbia. During this period, she developed a reputation as an astute critic of the government of British Columbia, irrespective of which political party was in power. During her career as a journalist, she was a British Columbia Legislature and Ottawa Parliament Hill reporter, primarily associated with the Vancouver Sun, the Ottawa Journal and the Ottawa Citizen. She was a close associate of fellow journalists Allan Fotheringham, Pamela Wallin (as of 2009, a member of the Senate of Canada), Hugh Winsor, John Sawatsky and Jack Webster.

Nichols was diagnosed with inoperable lung cancer in 1988. From this time until her death, she was primarily a political columnist at the Ottawa Citizen. She did not publicly discuss her illness. Journalist Jane O'Hara, then Vancouver bureau chief for Maclean's Magazine, met Nichols in 1991, and the two collaborated on Nichols' memoir, Mark My Words: Memoirs of A Very Political Reporter, which was published posthumously, in 1992. In the memoir, Nichols was candid in relation to later career alcoholism and various affairs. Nichols left no publicly acknowledged partner.

== Bibliography ==
- Bill Bennett, the end, (1986); about the politician Bill Bennett
- Mark My Words: Memoirs of A Very Political Reporter, (1992, Douglas & McIntyre); co-authored with Jane O'Hara
