= LCSD =

LCSD may refer to:

- Left cardiac sympathetic denervation
- Leisure and Cultural Services Department, a department of Government of Hong Kong

School districts in Canada

- Lloydminster Catholic School Division in Saskatchewan

School districts in the United States

- Lamar County School District in Georgia
- Lamar County School District in Mississippi
- Leflore County School District in Mississippi
- Lewis and Clark School District in North Dakota
- Liverpool Central School District of Liverpool, New York
- Longwood Central School District of Suffolk County, New York
- Logan City School District of Utah
- Lowndes County School District of Mississippi
