= PRSD =

PRSD may refer to:

- The Social Democrat Radical Party in Chile, also known as Partido Radical Socialdemócrata

Education

- Peace River School Division in Alberta, Canada
- Pearl River School District in Pearl River, New York, USA
- Pentucket Regional School District in West Newbury, Massachusetts, USA
- Pinelands Regional School District in Tuckerton, New Jersey, USA
- Pine-Richland School District in Richland Township, Pennsylvania, USA
