= Crescent Heights High School =

Crescent Heights High School may refer to

- Crescent Heights High School (Calgary) in Alberta
- Crescent Heights High School (Medicine Hat) in Alberta
