= Father Patrick Mercredi Community High School =

Roman Catholic high school in Canada

Coordinates: 56.731°N 111.431°W

Father Mercredi Community High School is a Roman Catholic high school in Fort McMurray, Alberta, Canada. It became the first Catholic high school in the city of Fort McMurray and is operated by the Fort McMurray Catholic School District.

== History ==
The school was named after Father Patrick Mercredi, the second First Nations priest in the Province of Alberta.

== Administration ==
- Principal: Lisa Miller
