= Lindsay Thurber Comprehensive High School =

Location
- 4204 58 St; Red Deer, Alberta, AB T4N 2L6; Canada

Information
- School type: High school
- Founded: 1947
- School board: Red Deer Public School District
- Principal: Jeannette Leahman
- Staff: 131
- Grades: 9–12
- Enrollment: 2000+
- Language: English
- Colours: Red and white
- Team name: Raiders
- Website: lindsaythurber.rdpsd.ab.ca

École Lindsay Thurber Comprehensive High School is the largest school (by enrolment) in Red Deer, Alberta, and is operated by the Red Deer Public School District. The public high school is one of four in Red Deer, Alberta, and serves grades nine through twelve. It is the oldest school still operating in Red Deer. Adjacent to the school, there is an athletic park, named Woody's Athletic Park. The athletic park includes a running track and is commonly used for track and field events.

== History ==
Officially opening in 1947 as Red Deer Composite High School, utilizing the former A-20 Army Corps service buildings, it replaced the Red Deer High School. In 1953, a new school was built and replaced Red Deer Composite High School, named Lindsay Thurber Composite High School. In 1963, the Red Deer Vocational High School had opened adjacent to Lindsay Thurber High School. In 1970, Red Deer Vocational High School amalgamated with Lindsay Thurber Composite High School, subsequently renaming it to Lindsay Thurber Comprehensive High School.
