= Father Gerard Redmond Community Catholic School =

Location
- 174 Maligne Drive; Hinton, Alberta, T7V 1T5; Canada; 53.394952°N 117.5831°W

Information
- School type: Junior High/High School
- Motto: "Ever Growing, Learning, and Living in Christ"
- Founded: 1982
- School board: Evergreen Catholic Separate School Division
- Principal: Barb Marchant
- Grades: 5–12
- Language: English
- Colours: Navy Blue and White
- Team name: Raiders
- Website: www.grccs.ca

Father Gerard Redmond Community Catholic School was named after Father Gerard Redmond who presided over Our Lady of the Foothills Parish from 1964 – 1970 and again from 1980 -1983. Fr. Redmond was instrumental in the initial development of a Catholic school system here in Hinton, Alberta beginning officially in 1982. Originally providing education for grades K – 9, it became a K – 12 school in 1999, and in 2005, after extensive renovations, it began its current configuration as a grade 5 – 12 school.
