= East Central Alberta Catholic Separate Schools Regional Division No. 16 =

School district in Alberta, Canada

Location
- 1018 - 1st Avenue; Wainwright, Alberta, Canada Canada

Other information
- Website: www.ecacs16.ab.ca

East Central Alberta Catholic Separate Schools Regional Division No. 16 or East Central Alberta Catholic Schools is a separate school authority within the Canadian province of Alberta operated out of Wainwright.

== Schools ==
- Blessed Sacrament Outreach School, Wainwright (10-12)
- Blessed Sacrament School, Wainwright (K-12)
- Christ-King Catholic School, Wainwright (PK-9)
- School of Hope & Hope Home Schooling (K-12)
- St. Jerome's School, Vermilion (K-12)
- St. Thomas Aquinas School, Provost (K-12)
- Theresetta Catholic School, Wainwright (K-9)

== See also ==
- List of school authorities in Alberta
