= Elk Island Public Schools =

Canadian Public School

Address
- 683 Wye Road Sherwood Park, Alberta, T8B 1N2; Canada

Other information
- Website: www.eips.ca

Elk Island Public Schools, or EIPS, is a public school authority within the Canadian province of Alberta operated out of Sherwood Park.

The division is composed of 43 schools, 17460 students, and the full-time equivalent of approximately 1435 staff, 875 of which are full-time equivalent teaching staff. It is one of the largest divisions in the province.

== Schools ==
- A.L. Horton Elementary School, Vegreville (PK-6)
- Ardrossan Elementary School, Ardrossan (PK-6)
- Ardrossan Junior Senior High School, Ardrossan (7-12)
- Bruderheim School, Bruderheim (PK-6)
- Elk Island Youth Ranch Learning Centre, Lamont (7-12)
- Lamont Elementary School, Lamont (PK-6)
- Lamont High School, Lamont (7-12)
- Mundare School, Mundare (K-9)
- Next Step Vegreville, Vegreville (8-12)
- Pleasant Ridge Colony School, Vegreville (K-9)
- Scotford Colony, Bruderheim (K-9)
- Uncas Elementary School, Ardrossan (K-6)
- Vegreville Composite High School, Vegreville (7-12)

=== Fort Saskatchewan ===
- École Parc Élémentaire (PK-6)
- Fort Saskatchewan Christian School (K-9)
- Fort Saskatchewan Elementary School (K-6)
- Fort Saskatchewan Senior High School (10-12)
- James Mowat Elementary School (K-6)
- Next Step Fort Saskatchewan (8-12)
- Rudolph Hennig Junior High School (7-9)
- SouthPointe School (K-9)
- Win Ferguson Elementary (PK-6)

=== Sherwood Park ===
- Bev Facey Community High School (10-12)
- Brentwood Elementary School (K-6)
- Campus EIPS (9-12)
- Clover Bar Junior High School (7-9)
- Davidson Creek Elementary School (K-6)
- F.R. Haythorne Junior High School (7-9)
- Forest Grove School (K-9)
- Fultonvale Elementary Junior High School (K-9)
- Glen Allan Elementary School (PK-6)
- Heritage Hills Elementary School (K-6)
- Lakeland Ridge School (PK-9)
- Mills Haven Elementary School (K-6)
- Next Step Sherwood Park (8-12)
- Pine Street Elementary School (PK-6)
- Salisbury Composite High School (10-12)
- Strathcona Christian Academy (K-12)
- Wes Hosford Elementary School (K-6)
- Westboro Elementary School (PK-6)
- Woodbridge Farms Elementary School (K-6)

== See also ==
- List of school authorities in Alberta
