= Black Gold Regional Division No. 18 =

School district in Alberta, Canada

Black Gold School Division

Location
- 3rd Floor, 1101 - 5 Street; Nisku, Alberta, Canada Canada

District information
- Superintendent: Michael Borgfjord
- Chair of the board: Devonna Klaassen
- Schools: 32

Students and staff
- Students: 13,000+
- Teachers: 720
- Staff: 634

Other information
- Website: www.blackgold.ca

Black Gold School Division is a public school authority in Central Alberta, Canada, headquartered in Nisku.

== Size ==
Black Gold School Division (BGSD) is the 7th largest public school division in Alberta with approximately 13,500 students in 32 schools. Approximately 768 teachers and 603 support staff are employed in the division. Formed in 1995, BGSD serves Leduc County, and several municipalities within it, including Beaumont, Calmar, Devon, the city of Leduc, Thorsby, and Warburg.

The division provides education from pre-kindergarten to grade 12, and offers second language instruction, Career and Technology Studies (CTS) programs, as well as specialized support and disabilities services.

== Governance ==
The Board of Trustees of Black Gold School Division is composed of seven trustees, elected as follows, according to Bylaw No. 1-95: one from the Town of Beaumont, one from the town of Devon, two from the city of Leduc, and three from subdivisions of the remainder of Leduc County.

The Board of Trustees provide overall direction and leadership to the School Division, and is accountable for the provision of appropriate educational services and programs to resident students in keeping with the requirements of government legislation and the values of voters.

== French immersion ==
Black Gold School Division offers Early French Immersion in its Beaumont and Leduc schools with the objective of providing full mastery of the English language, functional fluency in French, as well as an understanding and appreciation of Francophone culture (including that of the Franco-Albertans). Early immersion means that students begin their immersion experience in Kindergarten or Grade 1 and continue in the program to Grade 12.

== Schools ==
- Covenant Christian School, Leduc County (K-9)

=== Beaumont ===
- Black Gold Home-Based School (1-12)
- Black Gold Outreach-Beaumont School (7-12)
- École Beau Meadow School (K-6)
- École Bellevue School (K-6)
- École Champs Vallée School (K-9)
- École Dansereau Meadows School (K-9)
- École Horizon Heights School (K-6)
- École J.E. Lapointe School (7-9)
- École Secondaire Beaumont Composite High School (10-12)

=== Calmar ===
- Calmar Elementary School (K-6)
- Calmar Secondary Collegiate School (7-12)

=== Devon ===
- John Maland High School (10-12)
- Riverview Middle School (5-9)
- Robina Baker Elementary School (K-4)

=== Leduc ===
- Black Gold Outreach School (7-12)
- Caledonia Park School (K-7)
- East Elementary School (K-6)
- École Corinthia Park School (K-6)
- École Leduc Estates School (K-6)
- École Leduc Junior High School (7-9)
- Leduc Composite High School (8-12)
- Linsford Park School (K-6)
- Ohpaho Secondary School (8-12)
- West Haven Public School (K-7)
- Willow Park School (K-6)

=== New Sarepta ===
- New Sarepta Community High School (7-12)
- New Sarepta Elementary School

=== Thorsby ===
- Thorsby Elementary School (K-6)
- Thorsby Junior/Senior High School (7-12)

=== Warburg ===
- Warburg School (K-12)
- Warburg Hutterite Colony School (1-9)

== See also ==
- List of school authorities in Alberta
