= Battle River Regional Division No. 31 =

School district in Alberta, Canada

Battle River School Division

Location
- 4302 38 Street; Camrose, Alberta, Canada Canada

Other information
- Website: www.brsd.ab.ca

Battle River School Division is a public school authority within the Canadian province of Alberta operated out of Camrose.

== Schools ==
- Bashaw School, Bashaw (K-12)
- Bawlf School, Bawlf (K-12)
- C.W. Sears School, Tofield (PK-4)
- Central High Sedgewick Public School, Sedgewick
- Daysland School, Daysland
- Forestburg School, Forestburg (K-12)
- Hay Lakes School, Hay Lakes (K-12)
- Killam Public School, Killam (K-9)
- New Norway School, New Norway (K-12)
- Round Hill School, Round Hill (K-9)
- Ryley School, Ryley (K-9)
- Tofield School, Tofield (5-12)
- Viking School, Viking (K-12)

=== Camrose ===
- Battle River Alternative Center for Education (BRACE)
- Chester Ronning School (K-5)
- École Camrose Composite High School (9-12)
- École Charlie Killam School (6-8)
- École Sifton School (PK-5)
- Jack Stuart School (PK-5)
- Sparling School (PK-5)

== See also ==
- List of school authorities in Alberta
