= Salisbury Composite High School =

Location
- 20 Festival Way; Sherwood Park, Alberta, T8A 4Y1; Canada; 53.525°N 113.300°W

Information
- School type: Public secondary
- Motto: Sail on with Pride and Tradition, represented by "Sic Sursum" (Sail On)
- Founded: 1953
- School board: EIPS (Elk Island Public Schools)
- Superintendent: Mark Liguori
- Principal: Curtis Starko
- Grades: 10-12
- Enrollment: approximately 1200
- Language: English
- Colours: Red, Black, and White
- Mascot: Sly the Sabre-Toothed Tiger
- Team name: Sabres
- Website: www.salcomp.ca

Salisbury Composite High School, often referred to as Sal or Sal Comp, is a public high school located in Sherwood Park, Alberta, Canada. It is part of Elk Island Public Schools

== History ==
Salisbury was founded in 1953, and had its first graduation in 1954, with 10 teachers and 27 students. In 1969, the school moved to its current location and opened a vocational department.

In February 2019, there was a bomb threat at the school.

== Motto and logo ==
Salisbury's motto is "Sail on with Pride and Tradition", represented by the latin phrase Sic Sursum, which means "sail on" (literal Latin translation: "thus upwards"). The school's logo is a sailing ship above the phrase Sic Sursum. The school colours are red, black and white, and its various sports teams are known as the Sabres.

Salisbury's crest consists of a red "S" in front of two crossed sabres which "point skywards in a salute to victory."

== Athletics ==
Salisbury athletics includes the following sports:

- Badminton
- Basketball
- Cheer
- Cross country
- Football
- Golf
- Indoor soccer (Co-Ed)
- Rugby
- Soccer
- Swimming
- Track and field
- Handball
- Volleyball

== Clubs ==
Clubs at Salisbury include the following:

- Debate and Model UN
- Esports, with competitive E-sports teams for League of Legends and Super Smash Bros.
- German Exchange
- GSA (Gender and Sexuality Alliance)
- Indigenous Youth and Allies Circle
- Movement
- Robotics
- SAIL (Students Active In Leadership)
- Salisbury for Humanity
- Video Game Club
- Yearbook

== Programs ==
In addition to offering English language arts, mathematics, science, social studies, and modern languages courses, the following programs are available at Salisbury:

- Career and Technology Studies (CTS), including foods, cosmetology, esthetics, mechanics, fabrication, design tech, computer science, and computer works
- Fine Arts, including music (jazz and concert bands), performing arts, and visual arts
- Special Interest Courses, including aboriginal studies, aviation, film, forensics, psychology, SK8trepreneur, and Students Active in Leadership (SAIL)
- Physical Education, including yoga
- Steps to Enhance Personal Success (STEPS), a program "designed for those students of junior to senior high age with significant mental or physical disabilities"
- Grade 10 Honours Programme
- International Baccalaureate, for Grades 11 and 12

== Notable alumni ==
- Mike Johnson, Former MLB player (Baltimore Orioles, Montreal Expos).
- Kelsey Mitchell, Olympic sprint track cycling gold-medalist. She is pictured prominently on the Sabre Athletics Legacy Wall within the school.
