= East Central Francophone Education Region No. 3 =

School district in Alberta, Canada

Location
- P.O. Box 249; St. Paul, Alberta, Canada Canada
- Coordinates: 53.990522°N 111.288297°W

Other information
- Website: www.centreest.ca

East Central Francophone Education Region No. 3, known in French as Conseil scolaire Centre-Est, is a French first language authority within the Canadian province of Alberta operated out of St. Paul.

== Schools ==
- École Beauséjour, Plamondon (PK-12)
- École des Beaux-Lacs, Bonnyville (PK-12)
- École du Sommet, St. Paul (PK-12)
- École Sainte-Catherine, Lac La Biche (PK-6)
- École Voyageur, Cold Lake (PK-12)
- Garderie Les Petits Oursons, St. Paul (Daycare)
- Le Centre francophone d’éducation à distance (CFÉD) (10-12)

== See also ==
- List of school authorities in Alberta
