= Horizon School Division No. 67 =

Public school authority within the Canadian province of Alberta

Location
- 6302 - 56 Street; Taber, Alberta, Canada Canada

Other information
- Website: www.horizon.ab.ca

Horizon School Division No. 67 or Horizon School Division is a public school authority within the Canadian province of Alberta operated out of Taber.

== Schools ==
- Barnwell School, Barnwell (PK-9)
- Chamberlain School/Arden T. Litt Center for Learning, Grassy Lake (PK-12)
- Enchant School, Enchant (PK-9)
- Hays School, Hays (PK-9)
- Horizon MAP School, Vauxhall (7-12)
- Lomond Community School, Lomond (K-12)
- Milk River Ridge School, Milk River (PK-12)
- Vauxhall Elementary School, Vauxhall (PK-6)
- Vauxhall High School, Vauxhall (7-12)
- Warner School, Warner (PK-12)

=== Taber ===
- ACE Place Learning Centre (7-12)
- Central Elementary School (PK-5)
- D.A. Ferguson Middle School (6-8)
- Dr. Hamman Elementary School (PK-5)
- Horizon Christian Program (6-12)
- L.T. Westlake Fine Arts Elementary School (PK-5)
- Taber Christian High School (9-12)
- Taber Christian School (PK-8)
- W. R. Myers High School (9-12)

== Colony Schools ==
- Armada Colony School
- Bluegrass Colony School
- Cameron Farms Colony School
- Copperfield Farms Colony School
- Delco Colony School
- Elmspring Colony School
- Enchant Colony School
- Evergreen Colony School
- Fairlane Colony School
- Gold Spring Colony School
- Hillridge Colony School
- Kingsland Colony School
- Lomond Colony School
- Midland Colony School
- Miltow Colony School
- Oakland Colony School
- Prairie Home Colony School
- River Road Colony School
- Sunnysite Colony School

== See also ==
- List of school authorities in Alberta
