= Calgary Islamic School =

School in Calgary, Alberta, Canada

Calgary Islamic School, Akram Jumaa Campus

Location
- 2612 37 Ave NE; Calgary, Alberta; Canada; 51.0877°N 114.0005°W

Information
- School type: Public
- Religious affiliation: Islamic
- Established: 1992
- Grades: K-12
- Language: English & Arabic
- Campus: Suburban
- Website: aj.myprps.com

The Calgary Islamic School (CIS) has two campuses in the north-east part of Calgary, Alberta. The Calgary Islamic School is part of the Prairie Rose Public Schools School Board

The Omar bin Khattab campus teaches Kindergarten to grade 9 and was purpose-built as a school. Contact info: (587) 353-8900, 225 28 Street S.E. | Calgary, AB T2A 5K4.

The Akram Jumaa campus was purchased as a purpose-built as a school and has since been extensively renovated to also include a Masjid (mosque) known as the NE mosque, and teaches grades kindergarten through twelve, and has a daycare located within the school as well. Contact info: (403) 248-2773, 2612-37 Avenue NE | Calgary, AB T1Y 5L2.

Both campuses have a Tahfeez, or Qur'an memorization, program running within the school for those who wish to memorize the Qur'an, as well as complete their Alberta curriculum education. In addition to the academic curriculum, the school teaches Arabic, Qur'anic Studies, and Islamic Studies.

The Calgary Islamic School was established in 1992 by the Muslim Community Foundation of Calgary.
