= Buffalo Head Prairie =

- Hamlet
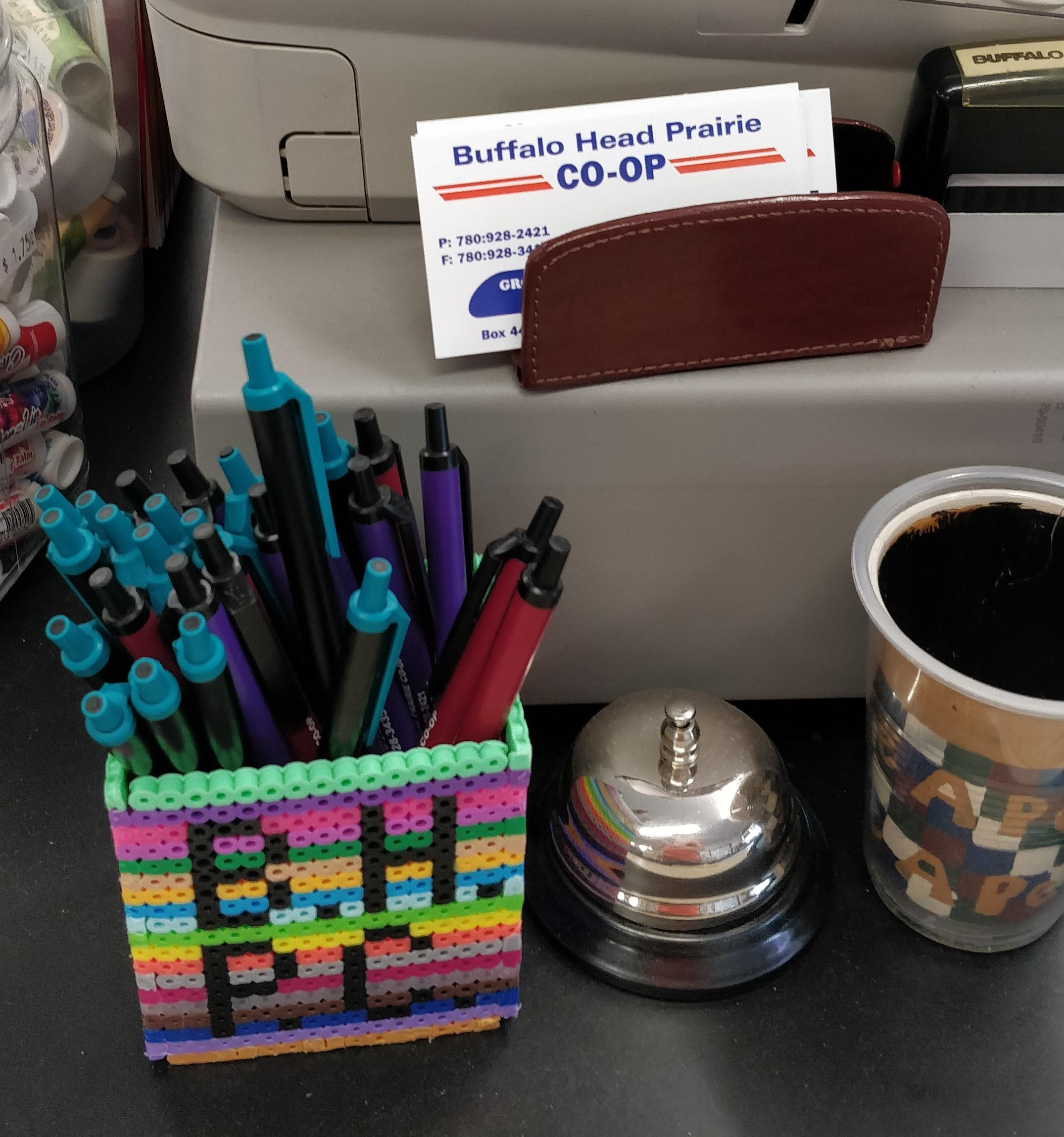
- Insignia of the Buffalo Head Prairie Co-op

- Location in Mackenzie County Location in Alberta Buffalo Head Prairie (Canada) Buffalo Head Prairie (North America)
- Coordinates: 58°03′03″N 116°20′58″W
- Country: Canada
- Province: Alberta
- Region: Northern Alberta
- Planning region: Lower Peace
- Specialized municipality: Mackenzie

Government
  - Type: Unincorporated
  - Governing body: Mackenzie County Council
- Time zone: UTC−7 (MST)
  - Summer (DST): UTC−6 (MDT)
- Postal code: T0H 4A0
- Area code: 780

Buffalo Head Prairie is an unincorporated community in Mackenzie County, Alberta, Canada. It is part of the Fort Vermilion School Division. Schools in the area include Buffalo Head Prairie School and Blue Hills Community School.

It is approximately 64 kilometres (40 mi) west of Highway 88 and 64 kilometres (40 mi) southeast of High Level. It is named for the nearby Buffalo Head Hills.

== Climate data ==
Climate data for Buffalo Head Prairie (1932-1959)
Month	Jan	Feb	Mar	Apr	May	Jun	Jul	Aug	Sep	Oct	Nov	Dec	Year
Record high °C (°F)	12.8 (55.0)	15.6 (60.1)	15.6 (60.1)	25.6 (78.1)	32.2 (90.0)	33.9 (93.0)	36.7 (98.1)	36.1 (97.0)	30.6 (87.1)	27.8 (82.0)	19.4 (66.9)	12.2 (54.0)	36.7 (98.1)
Record low °C (°F)	−53.3 (−64.0)	−50.0 (−58.0)	−39.4 (−38.9)	−33.3 (−27.9)	−12.2 (10.0)	−5.6 (21.9)	−5.6 (21.9)	−6.7 (19.9)	−12.2 (10.0)	−25.6 (−14.1)	−35.0 (−31.0)	−52.2 (−62.0)	−53.3 (−64.0)
