= Peace River School Division No. 10 =

School district in Alberta, Canada

Location
- 10018 - 101 street Peace River, Alberta, Canada Canada

Other information
- Website: www.prsd.ab.ca

Peace River School Division No. 10 or Peace River School Division is a public school authority within the Canadian province of Alberta operated out of Peace River.

== Schools ==
=== K-12 Schools ===
- Grimshaw Public School, Grimshaw
- Hines Creek Composite High School, Hines Creek
- Lloyd Garrison School, Berwyn
- Manning Aurora Composite School, Manning
- Menno Simons Community School, Cleardale
- Peace Learning Connection, Peace River
- Red Earth Creek School, Red Earth Creek
- Worsley Central School, Worsley

=== Elementary schools ===
- E.E. Oliver Elementary School, Fairview
- École Springfield Elementary School, Peace River
- Nampa Public School, Nampa

=== Middle schools ===
- T.A. Norris Middle School, Peace River

=== Secondary schools ===
- Fairview Jr./Sr. High School, Fairview
- Peace River High School, Peace River

=== Alternative schools ===
- Peace Learning Connection, Peace River

=== Colony schools ===
- Bear Canyon Colony School, Cherry Point
- Breaking Point Colony School, Manning
- Cleardale Colony School, Cleardale

== See also ==
- List of school authorities in Alberta
