= Peace Wapiti School Division No. 76 =

School district in Alberta, Canada

Peace Wapiti School Division No. 76 Peace Wapiti School Division

Location
- 8611A - 108 Street; Grande Prairie, Alberta, Canada Canada

Other information
- Website: www.pwpsd.ca

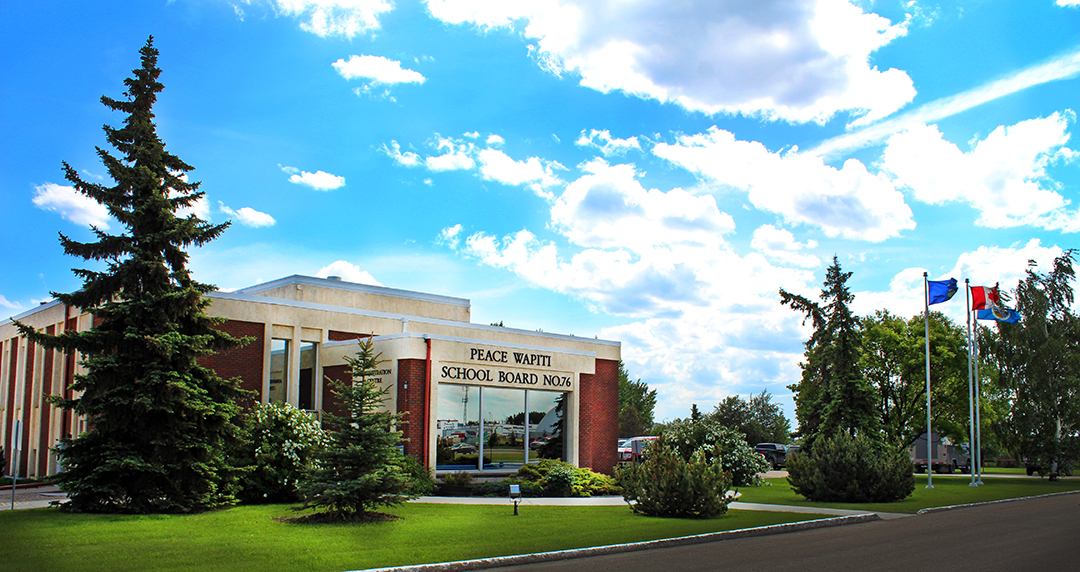
Peace Wapiti School Division’s Central Office

Peace Wapiti Public School Division No. 76 or Peace Wapiti Public School Division is a public school authority within the Canadian province of Alberta operated out of Grande Prairie. Peace Wapiti Public School Division provides service to more than 6,000 students in Kindergarten through Grade 12 in 32 schools, including seven Hutterite colony schools and an outreach/online school. The Board also operates a group home facility serving students in Northern Alberta.

== Schools ==
- Alternative Education Program, Grande Prairie
- Beaverlodge Elementary School, Beaverlodge (PK-6)
- Beaverlodge Regional High School, Beaverlodge (10-12)
- Bezanson School, Bezanson (K-9)
- Bonanza School, Bonanza (K-8)
- Clairmont Community School, Clairmont (K-8)
- Eaglesham School, Eaglesham (K-12)
- Elmworth School, Elmworth (K-9)
- Harry Balfour School, County of Grande Prairie No. 1 (PK-8)
- Helen E. Taylor School, Wembley (4-9)
- Hythe Regional School, Hythe (K-9)
- La Glace School, La Glace (PK-9)
- Peace Wapiti Academy, Grande Prairie (9-12)
- Penson School, Grovedale (K-8)
- Ridgevalley School, Crooked Creek (K-12)
- Robert W. Zahara School, Sexsmith (K-6)
- Rycroft School, Rycroft (PK-8)
- Savanna School, Silver Valley (PK-12)
- Sexsmith Secondary School, Sexsmith (7-12)
- Spirit River Regional Academy, Spirit River (PK-12)
- Teepee Creek School, Sexsmith (PK-8)
- Wembley Elementary School, Wembley (PK-3)
- Whispering Ridge Community School, Grande Prairie (PK-8)

=== Hutterite Colony Schools ===
- Bay Tree Colony School
- Birch Hills Colony School
- Birch Meadows Colony School
- Codesa Colony School
- Crooked Creek Colony School
- Doe River Colony School
- Grandview Colony School
- Shady Lane Colony School
- Silver Valley Colony School

== See also ==
- List of school authorities in Alberta
