= Sturgeon School Division No. 24 =

School district in Alberta, Canada

Sturgeon School Division No. 24 Sturgeon Public Schools

Location
- 9820 - 104 Street; Morinville, Alberta, Canada Canada

Other information
- Website: www.sturgeon.ab.ca

Sturgeon School Division No. 24 or Sturgeon Public Schools is a public school authority within the Canadian province of Alberta operated out of Morinville. Sturgeon Public Schools has many different schools in different towns, hamlets, and cities. The municipalities the division serves include, Sturgeon County, Morinville, Gibbons, Bon Accord, Redwater, Legal, and St. Albert.

== Schools ==
- Bon Accord Community School, Bon Accord (PK-4)
- Camilla School, Sturgeon County (PK-9)
- Four Winds Public School, Morinville (5-9)
- Gibbons School, Gibbons (5-9)
- Guthrie School, Lancaster Park (K-9)
- Landing Trail School, Gibbons (PK-4)
- Legal Public School, Legal (PK-6)
- Lillian Schick School, Bon Accord (5-9)
- Morinville Colony School, Sturgeon County (K-10)
- Morinville Public School, Morinville (PK-4)
- Namao School, Sturgeon County (K-9)
- Oak Hill School, Bon Accord (4-9)
- Ochre Park School, Redwater (PK-4)
- Redwater School, Redwater (5-12)
- Sturgeon Composite High School, Sturgeon County (10-12)
- Sturgeon Heights School, St. Albert (K-9)
- Sturgeon Learning Centre (8-12)

== See also ==
- List of school authorities in Alberta
