= Clearview School Division No. 71 =

School district in Alberta, Canada

Clearview School Division No. 71 Clearview Public Schools

Location
- Box 1720; Stettler, Alberta, Canada Canada

Other information
- Website: www.clearview.ab.ca

Clearview School Division No. 71 or Clearview Public Schools is a public school authority within the Canadian province of Alberta operated out of Stettler.

== Schools ==
- Big Valley School, Big Valley (PK-9)
- Botha School, Botha (ESC-6)
- Brownfield School, Brownfield (K-9)
- Byemoor School, Byemoor (K-9)
- Coronation School, Coronation (K-12)
- Donalda School, Donalda (K-9)
- Erskine School, Erskine (K-9)
- Gus Wetter School, Castor (PK-12)
- Stettler Elementary School, Stettler (K-6)
- William E. Hay Stettler Secondary Campus, Stettler (7-12)

=== Outreach Campuses ===
- Castor Outreach, Castor
- Coronation Outreach, Coronation
- William E. Hay Outreach Campus, Stettler

== See also ==
- List of school authorities in Alberta
