= Sturgeon Composite High School =

Public school in Alberta, Canada

Location
- Namao, Alberta, Canada; T8T 0E9
- Coordinates: 53.7167°N 113.4850°W

Information
- Type: Public high school
- Opened: 1977
- School board: Sturgeon School Division No. 24
- School number: 2510
- Principal: Darwin Krips
- Grades: 10–12
- Enrollment: 960 (2024–25)
- Campus type: Rural
- Team name: Spirits
- Website: www.sturgeoncomp.ca

Sturgeon Composite High School is a public school located in Namao, Alberta.

== Athletics ==
Sturgeon Composite High School competes in the 4A Class of the Edmonton Metro Zone of School Sport Alberta. School Sport Alberta was rebranded from Alberta Schools' Athletic Association in 2025.
