= Holy Family Catholic Regional Division No. 37 =

School district in Alberta, Canada

Location
- 10307 - 99 Street; Peace River, Alberta, Canada Canada

Other information
- Website: www.hfcrd.ab.ca

Holy Family Catholic Regional Division No. 37 is a separate school authority within the Canadian province of Alberta operated out of Peace River.

== Schools ==
- Glenmary School, Peace River (7-12)
- Good Shepherd School, Peace River (PK-6)
- Holy Family School, Grimshaw (ECS-9)
- Rosary School, Manning (ECS-9)
- St. Andrew's School, High Prairie (ECS-12)
- St. Stephen's School, Valleyview (ECS-9)
- St. Thomas More School, Fairview (ECS-12)

== See also ==
- List of school authorities in Alberta
