= Fort Vermilion School Division No. 52 =

School district in Alberta, Canada

Fort Vermilion School Division No. 52 Fort Vermilion School Division

Location
- 5213 River Road, P.O. Bag 1 Fort Vermilion, Alberta, Canada Canada

Other information
- Website: www.fvsd.ab.ca

Fort Vermilion School Division No. 52 or Fort Vermilion School Division is a public school authority within the Canadian province of Alberta operated out of Fort Vermilion.

== Schools ==
- Blue Hills Community School, Buffalo Head Prairie (K-12)
- Buffalo Head Prairie School, Buffalo Head Prairie (K-9)
- Florence MacDougall Community School, High Level (PK-3)
- Fort Vermilion Public School, Fort Vermilion (7-12)
- High Level Public School, High Level (7-12)
- Hill Crest Community School, La Crete (K-9)
- La Crete Public School, La Crete (7-12)
- Northern Home Education Centre, La Crete (K-12)
- Pathways Alternative School, La Crete/High Level (10-12)
- Rainbow Lake School, Rainbow Lake (K-12)
- Ridgeview Central School, La Crete (4-6)
- Rocky Lane School, Fort Vermilion (K-12)
- Sandhills Elementary School, La Crete (PK-3)
- Spirit of the North Community School, High Level (4-6)
- St. Mary's Catholic School, Fort Vermilion (K-6)
- Upper Hay River School, High Level (K-12)

== See also ==
- List of school authorities in Alberta
