= Tempo School =

Location
- 5603 148 St. NW; Edmonton, Alberta, T6H 4T7; 53°29′40″N 113°34′27″W

Information
- School type: Private school
- Motto: Tota Edocenda Maxime Parentum Officium (All teaching is pre-eminently the duty of parents)
- Established: 1963
- Faculty: 43 (2024-2025)
- Grades: K-12
- Enrolment: 483 (2025-2026)
- Colour: Forest green

Tempo School is a K-12 private school in the Riverbend neighbourhood of Edmonton, Alberta. It was founded upon the idea that the education of children is the responsibility of parents. The name of the school TEMPO is an acronym of its Latin motto: Tota Edocenda Maxime Parentum Officium (“all teaching is pre-eminently the duty of parents”).

It is a small academic school, with around 483 students as of 2026 and 45 faculty members. The school's curriculum focuses on the academic studies and intellectual development of its students through traditional teaching methods.

== History ==
Tempo was founded in 1963 by a local physician Dr. George N. Cormack and was incorporated by the provincial Tempo School Act of 1967. Dr. Cormack oversaw the school's development over the next three decades until his retirement as Director of the school in 1995.

The original Board included Dr. Cormack himself, Dr. Charles Allard, an Edmonton surgeon and entrepreneur, Mr. Sandy MacTaggart, an Edmonton developer and philanthropist, who became the 14th Chancellor of the University of Alberta in 1990, and The Reverend Dr. D. L. Leadbeater, Rector of Holy Trinity Church in Old Strathcona.

It was initially located inside the Holy Trinity Church with 10 first grade students. before moving to its present location in Riverbend in 1972 with 10 grades. The first class of Grade 12 students graduated in 1976, and a kindergarten was added in 2000.

== Admission ==
The school receives more applicants than students who are accepted. An applicant's eligibility is determined by interviews, tests, and past academic scores.

== Academics ==
Tempo School offers a unique program of study focusing on sciences and humanities; athletics and fine arts are considered by the school to be the parents' responsibility. The school also expects its students to maintain a full course load based on a prescribed curriculum.

French is a mandatory course taught from Grades 2 to 11, geography from Grades 3 to 11, English grammar from Grades 4 to 8, and STEM from Grades 7 to 9. The three major scientific fields, chemistry, biology, and physics, are taught as separate courses from Grade 7 on; as the Alberta government offers only a general Science course until Grade 11, the marks of Tempo's science courses are averaged into one Science mark until Grade 11.

This prescribed curriculum is designed to give students a background in a variety of academic programs and, in high school, ensure that the Alberta diploma requirements are filled or exceeded for all students, as well as prepare them for post-secondary studies. As a result, the school has the fourth-highest diploma exam average in the province as of 2015.

Many high school courses at Tempo are taught at an Advanced Placement (AP) or International Baccalaureate (IB) level, and some prepare students for AP exams. Additionally, the school offers extracurricular AP classes in English, French, Latin, European History, Biology, Physics, Chemistry, Calculus, and Psychology, as well as courses in Computer Science and Linear Algebra. However, because of Tempo's small size and academic focus, limited electives are offered for credit.

Physical Education is mandatory from Grades 5 to 9, and is offered as an elective at the 20 and 30 levels

== Extracurricular activities ==
A number of clubs are available at the school, including Coding, Young Engineers, Middle School Leadership, Math, Quiz Club, Computers, Chess, Student Council, Art, PE for grades 5 to 12 and AP Courses for the upper school student.

From Grade 9 on, students can run for positions in the Student Council, which organizes sports tournaments, dances, hot lunches, volunteering opportunities, fundraisers, and social events for the high school. A Grad Committee organizes the Grade 12 graduation.

The school has a prolific Speech and Debate team whose members have won medals at speech and debate tournaments, in English and French. The school hosts an intramural debate tournament for junior high students before the winter holiday, as well as the George Cormack Invitational Debate Tournament for senior high debaters across Edmonton. Some students also participate in the High School Model United Nations.

In the spring of 2026, an association football team for boys in Grades 10-12 was introduced.
