= Lloydminster Catholic School Division =

School division in Alberta and Saskatchewan, Canada

Lloydminster Catholic School Division (Lloydminster R.C.S.S.D. No. 89)

Location
- 6611B 39 St, Lloydminster, SK/AB T9V 2Z4 Canada
- Coordinates: 53.270424°N 110.042864°W

District information
- Type: Separate
- Grades: K-12
- Established: 1959
- Superintendent: Glenda Kary (Director of Education)

Students and staff
- Students: 3,071 (2025)

Other information
- Schools: 6
- Board Chair: Paula Scott
- Teachers' union: Saskatchewan Teachers' Federation
- Website: Lloydminster Catholic School Division

Lloydminster Catholic School Division (LCSD) or Lloydminster R.C.S.S.D. No. 89 is a Catholic school division serving approximately 3,000 students in Lloydminster, SK/AB and surrounding area. Lloydminster Catholic School Division operates four elementary schools for grades K-7, one high school for grades 8–12 and one early childhood education center. It is currently the city's sole provider of single-track French Immersion education from grades K-12 through École St. Thomas Elementary School and Holy Rosary High School. The division straddles the Alberta-Saskatchewan boundary and operates on Treaty 6 territory, and is governed under both provinces' education ministries.

== Context: a divided city ==
Lloydminster is Canada's only city split by a provincial boundary. When Alberta and Saskatchewan were created as provinces in 1905, the Fourth Meridian was chosen as the dividing line, bisecting the existing settlement; the Alberta portion incorporated as a village in 1906 and the Saskatchewan portion as a town in 1907, resulting for a quarter-century in duplicated municipal institutions on each side. The two halves were amalgamated into a single municipality by Order-in-Council of both provinces on 20 May 1930, and jointly chartered as a city by both provinces in 1958. The resulting bi-provincial charter arrangement is reflected in the city's institutions, including its two school divisions — the Catholic Lloydminster Catholic School Division and the public Lloydminster Public School Division — both of which operate schools and enrol students on both sides of the interprovincial boundary.

== History ==
Lloydminster Catholic School Division was established in 1959 and opened its first school, École St. Thomas, in 1961. St. Mary's School opened in 1963, initially serving students from grades 9 through 12. With the opening of the public Lloydminster Comprehensive High School in 1968, the Catholic school division relinquished responsibilities of Grades 10 through 12 to the public school division and re-purposed St. Mary's Elementary School as a junior high school in 1969.

Due to growing enrolment across the division, Father Gorman Elementary School was built in 1977 followed by St. Joseph Elementary School in 1982. By 1985, the division had sufficient facility space and demand to offer Catholic education for grades 10 through 12. St. Mary's School became a high school and was renamed Holy Rosary High School. École St. Thomas also began to offer Lloydminster's first French Immersion program in 1985.

Holy Rosary High School moved to a new facility in the fall of 2001, serving students Grades 8 through 12 with both English and French Immersion learning opportunities. The former facility was once again renamed St. Mary's Elementary School. The construction of the new Holy Rosary High School included adjacent office space for the division office. École St. Thomas School moved to a newly built facility in the fall of 2013, with the former building being re-purposed as Mother Teresa Early Childhood Education Center.

Holy Rosary High School received part of a $110.5 million allocation the Saskatchewan Government awarded to six schools across the province. The division subsequently received $10 million from the Government of Saskatchewan to fund an expansion of Holy Rosary High School. The project included the expansion of the south wing, complete with a new common space, new classrooms, STEM labs, a new art studio/gallery, as well as an e-sports lab. Construction on the new wing started at the end of 2021, and it opened to students in February 2023, adding capacity for an additional 400 students. The expansion also included a new welding lab, which opened a couple of months before the wing, and a library addition, which opened later in 2023.

=== 2024–2026 ===
In the period from 2024 to 2026, the Lloydminster Catholic School Division undertook a number of initiatives and received recognition reflecting growth in infrastructure, teaching excellence, and community engagement.

Infrastructure enhancements. LCSD completed several playground construction and revitalisation projects across its schools to support active play and outdoor learning. These projects included modern play equipment installations designed to enhance safety, accessibility, and student engagement in physical activity.

Awards and recognition. Teachers and staff within the division received provincial and national awards in recognition of excellence in education, leadership, and contributions to student learning.

Community engagement. In 2026, LCSD celebrated the fifth anniversary of the Donut Mission, an annual community-based initiative aimed at supporting local families and fostering school-community connections.

In September 2025, the division confirmed Glenda Kary as its Director of Education, following her period acting in the role since March 2025. Kary, who has 28 years of service with the division, succeeded Nigel McCarthy, who had held the post for almost eight years until June 2025. The same month, a by-election was held for a vacant seat on the LCSD Board of Trustees, following the resignation of trustee Cal Fendelet after 12 years of service; Jarrett Reeb was elected to the seat on 8 September 2025.

== Governance ==
The division is led by a Director of Education, currently Glenda Kary, supported by a Superintendent of Education, Vince Orieux, who oversees curriculum delivery and school performance. The division's Board of Trustees is chaired by Paula Scott.

== List of Schools ==
- Father Gorman Community School
- Holy Rosary High School
- St. Joseph Elementary School
- St. Mary's Elementary School
- École St. Thomas Elementary School
- Mother Teresa Early Childhood Education Center
