= Livingstone Range School Division No. 68 =

Public school authority in southern Alberta, Canada

Livingstone Range School Division

Location
- G.R. Davis Administration Building; 410 20 Street (P.O. Box 1810); Fort Macleod, Alberta, T0L 0Z0 Canada

District information
- Superintendent: Sean Beaton
- Chair of the board: Brad Toone
- Schools: 31 (including 13 colony schools)

Students and staff
- Students: 3,803
- Teachers: Approximately 250

Other information
- Elected trustees: Brad Toone, (Chairman) Ward 1 Kathy Charchun, Ward 1 Carla Gimber, Ward 1 Greg Long, Ward 2 Clara Yagos, Ward 2 Lori Hodges, Ward 3 Jim Burdette (Vice-Chairman), Ward 3
- Website: www.lrsd.ca

Livingstone Range School Division is the public school authority for southwest Alberta, Canada operated out of Fort Macleod.

== General ==
Livingstone Range School Division or LRSD, for short, operates 18 public schools and 13 Hutterite colony schools covering grades ranging from Kindergarten to Grade 12. Enrollment for 2025/2025 is approximately 3,800 students. LRSD's boundaries include: The M.D. of Willow Creek, The M.D. of Pincher Creek, The M.D of Ranchland (partial) and the Municipality of Crowsnest Pass. Students are also welcomed from neighbouring Indigenous Reserves, both the Piikani (Brocket) and Kainai (Blood) Nations.

== Schools ==
=== Claresholm ===
- West Meadow School (grades K-6)
- Willow Creek Composite High School (grades 7-12)

=== Crowsnest Pass ===
- Horace Allen Elementary School (K-3)
- Isabelle Sellon School (grades 4–6)
- Crowsnest Consolidated High School (grades 7-12)

=== Fort Macleod ===
- W.A. Day School (K-5)
- F.P. Walshe High School (grades 6-12)

=== Granum ===
- Granum School (K-9)

=== Lundbreck ===
- Livingstone School (K-12)

=== Nanton ===
- A.B. Daley School (K-6)
- J.T. Foster High School (grades 7-12)

=== Pincher Creek ===
- Canyon School (K-6)
- Matthew Halton High School (grades 7-12)

=== Stavely ===
- Stavely School (K-6)

=== Outreach, Virtual & Specialty Programs ===
- LRSD Pursuits Virtual School (Division Wide)
- MHHS Gateway Campus - Gr. 10-12 (Pincher Creek)
- PEAKS Campus (Crowsnest Pass)
- Walshe Crossroads Campus (Fort Macleod)

=== Colony Schools ===
- Clear Lake Colony
- Daly Creek Colony
- Ewelme Colony
- Greenwood Colony
- Jumbo Valley Colony
- Little Bow Colony
- Livingstone Colony
- Parkland Colony
- Pincher Creek Colony
- Spring Point Colony
- Thompson Colony
- Waterton Colony
- Willow Creek Colony
