= Crooked Creek, Alberta =

Crooked Creek
- Unincorporated community
- Location of Crooked Creek in Alberta
- Coordinates: 55.1708°N 117.8897°W
- Country: Canada
- Province: Alberta
- Census division: No. 18
- Municipal district: Municipal District of Greenview No. 16

Government
  - Type: Unincorporated
  - Governing body: Municipal District of Greenview No. 16 Council
- Time zone: UTC-7 (MST)

Crooked Creek is an unincorporated community in northern Alberta, Canada along Highway 43 between Valleyview and Grande Prairie. It lies within the Municipal District of Greenview No. 16 as well as the Peace Wapiti School Division.

The region is largely agricultural, though oil development in recent years has assisted the growth of small businesses and brought many other jobs. The construction and forestry industries are also important employers. The community is home to a mix of various cultures, including important Mennonite and Hutterite communities.

It is home to a few schools, the largest of which is Ridgevalley School, a K-12 public school that serves a large region from the edge of Sturgeon Lake to the east, and Bezanson to the west. The school is attended by approximately 300 students. A grade 1 through 9 school also serves a relatively large Mennonite community, and a nearby Hutterite colony has its own local school.

== See also ==
- List of communities in Alberta
