= St. Paul Education Regional Division No. 1 =

School district in Alberta, Canada

St. Paul Education Regional Division No. 1 St. Paul Education

Location
- 4313 48 Avenue; St. Paul, Alberta, Canada Canada

Other information
- Website: www.stpauleducation.ab.ca

St. Paul Education Regional Division No. 1 or St. Paul Education is a public school authority within the Canadian province of Alberta operated out of St. Paul.

== Schools ==
- Ashmont School, Ashmont (K-12)
- École Mallaig School, Mallaig (K-12)
- École Racette Junior High School, St. Paul (6-9)
- École St. Paul Elementary School, St. Paul (K-5)
- Elk Point Elementary School, Elk Point (K-6)
- Elk Point Outreach School, Elk Point (7-12)
- F.G. Miller Jr/Sr High School, Elk Point (7-12)
- Glen Avon School, St. Paul (K-9)
- Heinsburg Community School, Heinsburg (K-12)
- Myrnam Outreach and Homeschool Centre, Myrnam (4-12)
- New Myrnam School, Myrnam (K-12)
- St. Paul Alternate Education Centre, St. Paul (9-12)
- St. Paul Regional High School, St. Paul (10-12)
- Two Hills Mennonite School, Two Hills (K-12)
- Two Hills School, Two Hills (K-12)

=== Colony Schools ===
- Hairy Hill Colony School, Hairy Hill
- Plain Lake Colony School, Two Hills
- Stony Creek Colony School, Two Hills

== See also ==
- List of school authorities in Alberta
