= Elk Island Catholic Separate Regional Division No. 41 =

School district in Alberta, Canada

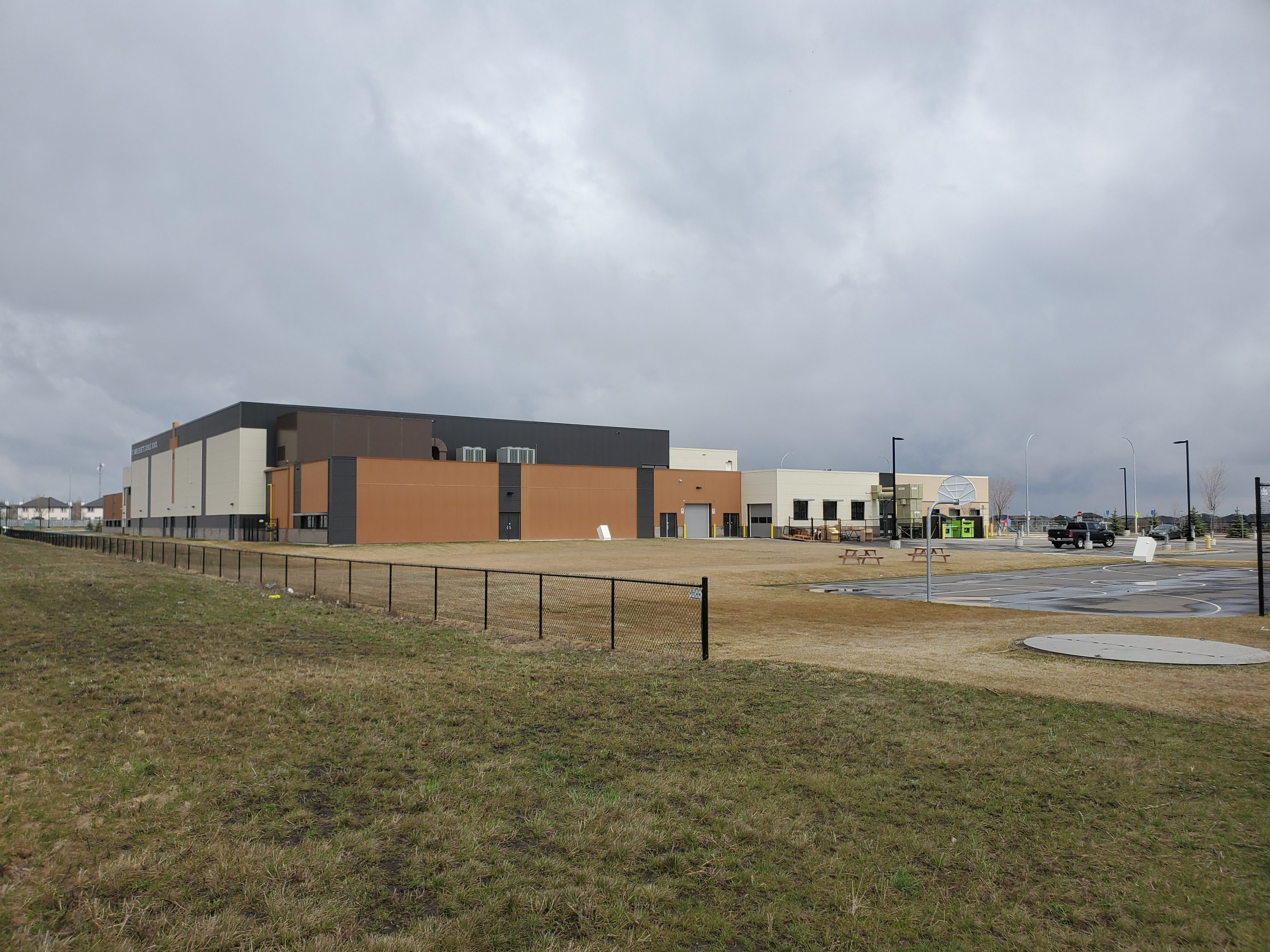
- St. André Bessette Catholic School in Fort Saskatchewan

Location
- 160 Festival Way; Sherwood Park, Alberta, Canada Canada

Other information
- Website: www.eics.ab.ca

Elk Island Catholic Separate Regional Division No. 41 or Elk Island Catholic Schools is a separate school authority within the Canadian province of Alberta operated out of Sherwood Park.

== Schools ==
- Holy Redeemer Catholic School, Ardrossan (PK-8)

=== Camrose ===
- Our Lady of Mount Pleasant Catholic School (5-8)
- St. Carlo Acutis Catholic High School (9-12)
- St. Patrick Catholic School (PK-4)

=== Fort Saskatchewan ===
- Our Lady of the Angels Catholic School (PK-4)
- St. André Bessette Catholic School (9-12)
- St. John Paul II Catholic School (5-8)
- St. John XXIII Catholic School (K-4)

=== Sherwood Park ===
- Archbishop Jordan High School (9-12)
- Chesterton Academy of St. Isidore (9-12)
- École Our Lady of Perpetual Help Catholic School (5-8)
- École Père Kenneth Kearns Catholic Elementary School (PK-4)
- Holy Spirit Catholic Elementary School (PK-4)
- Madonna Catholic School (PK-4)
- St. Isidore Learning Centre (1-12)
- St. Luke Catholic School (PK-8)
- St. Nicholas Catholic School (PK-4)
- St. Theresa Catholic School (5-8)

=== Vegreville ===
- St. Martin's Catholic School (PK-6)
- St. Mary's Catholic School (7-12)

== See also ==
- List of school authorities in Alberta
