= Crescent Heights High School (Medicine Hat) =

Location
- 1201 Division Avenue NE; Medicine Hat, Alberta; Canada; 50.053°N 110.687°W

Information
- School type: Public junior/senior high school
- Motto: Invictus
- School board: Medicine Hat School District No. 76
- Principal: Mike Kukurudza
- Grades: 7–12
- Enrollment: 1,300 (210 per grade)
- Mascot: Viking
- Team name: Vikings
- Website: chhs.mhpsd.ca

Crescent Heights High School is a public high school with approximately 1,300 students in grades 7–12 in Medicine Hat, Alberta. The school is part of the Medicine Hat School District No. 76 and is one of four high schools in the city of Medicine Hat, Alberta supporting a population of some 60,000 people. There are approximately 210 students per grade. The junior high school students are grouped in homeroom classes while the senior high school students are in classes independent of each other.

== Sports and extracurricular programs ==
CHHS offers extracurricular programs and sports activities for students to participate in including:

Athletics

- Badminton
- Basketball
- Cross country running
- Football
- Volleyball
- Rugby
- Track and Field
- Ringette Academy
- Table Tennis

Extracurriculars

- Anime
- Jr and Sr Council
- Chess
- Religion Based Groups
- Robotics Club
- Grad Choir
- Jazz Band
- Myplace activities for grade sevens and eights
- E-Sports Club

== Fine Arts ==
CHHS is recognised for its arts programs that include the drama, band, and visual art programs.

Theatre Arts

CHHS Drama, under the direction of Jennifer Davies, has mainly made renditions of plays and musicals. Their plays are often known for their live musicians in the pit orchestra. Many CHHS graduates of the Drama program have gone on to pursue the Fine Arts professionally.

CHHS Drama has presented many Broadway featured shows including: "Happy Days: The Musical," "Addams Family," "All Shook Up," "The Lion King Jr.," "Bonnie & Clyde," "Young Frankenstein," "Newsies," and "Bullets Over Broadway." In January 2020 they presented the musical "We Will Rock You."

Senior Band

The CHHS Senior Band, directed by Curtis Perrin, has toured around the world and is best known for success at the Harrogate International Music Festival. They have been requested as repeat performers at St. James Church, Birstwith, UK for the past 6 years. Many graduates of the Band program have gone on to pursue music professionally, achieving outstanding success.

== Notable alumni ==
- Terri Clark - Country music star
- Gordie Johnson - Musician, current frontman of Grady, former frontman of Big Sugar
- Aaron Crawford - CFL Football Player
- Mark Sakamoto - Writer
- Connor McGough - CFL Football Player
