= Foothills School Division No. 38 =

School district in Alberta, Canada

Foothills School Division

Location
- P.O. Box 5700; High River, Alberta, Canada T1V 1M7

Other information
- Website: www.foothillsschooldivision.ca

Foothills School Division is a public school authority within the Canadian province of Alberta operated out of High River. The K- 12 Division is a place for all and serves the regions of Okotoks, High River, Diamond Valley, Millarville, Blackie, Cayley, and the surrounding county of Foothills. Programs include Junior Kindergarten (preschool), Kindergarten, outdoor education, French Immersion, Dual Credit programs, Registered Apprenticeship Programs, career technologies, and Fine Arts.

== Schools ==
=== Elementary Schools ===
- Big Rock School, Okotoks
- C. Ian McLaren School, Diamond Valley
- Dr. Morris Gibson School, Okotoks
- École Joe Clark School, High River
- École Percy Pegler School, Okotoks
- Longview School, Longview
- Spitzee Elementary School, High River
- Turner Valley School, Diamond Valley

=== Elementary/Middle Schools ===
- Blackie School, Blackie
- Cayley School, Cayley
- Heritage Heights School, Foothills
- Meadow Ridge School, Okotoks
- Millarville School, Millarville
- Red Deer Lake School, Foothills
- Westmount School, Okotoks

=== Middle Schools ===
- École Okotoks Junior High School, Okotoks
- École Senator Riley Middle School, High River

=== Middle/High Schools ===
- Oilfields School, Diamond Valley

=== High Schools ===
- Cameron Crossing School, Okotoks
- École Secondaire Foothills Composite High School/Alberta High School of Fine Arts, Okotoks
- École Secondaire Highwood High School, High River
- Foothills Digital School, Okotoks

== See also ==
- List of school authorities in Alberta
