= Bearspaw Christian School =

Location
- 15001 - 69 Street NW; Calgary, Alberta, T3R 1C5; Canada; 51.163106°N 114.173609°W

Information
- Type: Private, Independent
- Religious affiliation: Christian
- Denomination: Non-Denominational
- Founded: 1998
- President: Jon Roper - Head of School
- Principal: Robyn Gallant - High School Principal
- Principal: Gabriel Choi - Middle School Principal
- Principal: Lesley Wenzel - Elementary School Principal
- Employees: 100+
- Grades: K-12
- Enrolment: 800+
- Language: English
- Campus size: 39 acres (16 hectares)
- Colours: Blue, Gold, White
- Team name: The Grizzlies
- Website: www.bearspawschool.com

Bearspaw Christian School (BCS) is a non-denominational, private Christian school for Kindergarten to Grade 12. BCS is located in the northwest corner of Calgary, Alberta with an enrolment of 800+ students.

BCS is accredited by Alberta Education and is affiliated with the Association of Christian Schools International (ACSI), the Association of Independent Schools and Colleges of Alberta (AISCA), and the Independent Schools' Athletic Association (ISAA).

The school was established on its current campus in 1998.
