= Grande Prairie Roman Catholic Separate School District No. 28 =

Canadian school district

Location
- 9902 101 ST; Grande Prairie, Alberta, Canada Canada

Other information
- Website: gpcsd.ca

Grande Prairie Roman Catholic Separate School District No. 28 or Grande Prairie and District Catholic Schools is a separate school authority within the Canadian province of Alberta operated out of Grande Prairie.

== Schools ==
School	Location	Grades Served	Website
École St. Gerard	Grande Prairie	PK-9	https://stgerard.gpcsd.ca/
École Catholique Louis Riel	Grande Prairie	PK-9	https://louisriel.gpcsd.ca/
Holy Cross Catholic School	Grande Prairie	PK-8	https://holycross.gpcsd.ca/
Mother Teresa Catholic School	Grande Prairie	PK-6	https://motherteresa.gpcsd.ca/
St. Catherine Catholic School	Grande Prairie	PK-8	https://stcatherine.gpcsd.ca/
St. Clement Catholic School	Grande Prairie	PK-8	https://stclement.gpcsd.ca/
St. John Bosco Catholic School	Grande Prairie	10-12	https://stjohnbosco.gpcsd.ca/
St. John Paul II / Faculté St-Jean Paul II	Grande Prairie	9-12	https://stjohnpaul.gpcsd.ca/
St. Joseph Catholic High School	Grande Prairie	9-12	https://stjoseph.gpcsd.ca/
St. Kateri Catholic School	Grande Prairie	PK-8	https://kateri.gpcsd.ca/
St. Mary Catholic School	Beaverlodge	PK-9	https://stmarybv.gpcsd.ca/
St. Mary's Catholic School	Sexsmith	PK-8	https://stmarys.gpcsd.ca/
St. Patrick Catholic School	Grande Prairie	PK-8	https://stpatrick.gpcsd.ca/
Ste. Marie Catholic School	Spirit River	PK-8	https://stemarie.gpcsd.ca/

== See also ==
- List of school authorities in Alberta
