= Lakeland Roman Catholic Separate School District No. 150 =

School district in Alberta, Canada

Location
- 4810 - 46 Street; Bonnyville, Alberta, Canada Canada

Other information
- Website: www.lcsd150.ab.ca

Lakeland Roman Catholic Separate School District No. 150 or Lakeland Catholic Schools is a separate school authority within the Canadian province of Alberta operating out of Bonnyville.

== Schools ==
- Assumption Junior/Senior High School, Cold Lake (7-12)
- École Dr. Bernard Brosseau Catholic School, Bonnyville (5-8)
- École Notre Dame Elementary School, Bonnyville (PK-4)
- École Notre Dame High School, Bonnyville (9-12)
- Holy Cross Elementary School, Cold Lake (K-6)
- Holy Family Catholic School, Waskatenau (K-12)
- Light of Christ Catholic School, Lac La Biche (PK-12)
- St. Dominic Elementary School, Cold Lake (K-6)

== See also ==
- List of school authorities in Alberta
