= The Southern Francophone Education Region No. 4 =

French first language authority

Location
- Suite 230, 6940 Fisher Road SE; Calgary, Alberta, Canada Canada
- Coordinates: 50.9930°N 114.0673°W

The Southern Francophone Education Region No. 4 (French: Conseil scolaire FrancoSud) is a French first language authority within the Canadian province of Alberta operated out of Calgary.

A merger between the Conseil scolaire catholique et francophone du Sud de l'Alberta and the Conseil scolaire du Sud de l'Alberta in August 2013 led to the creation of Conseil scolaire FrancoSud.

== Schools ==
=== Public ===
- École Beausoleil, Okotoks (K-12)
- École de l’Oasis, Chestermere (K-6)
- École des Grands-Vents, Bellevue (K-6)
- École des Hautes-Plaines, Airdrie (K-12)
- École La Vérendrye, Lethbridge (K-12)
- École Le Ruisseau, Brooks (K-12)
- École Les Cyprès, Medicine Hat (K-12)
- École Sentiers de la Rivière, Cardston (K-9)

==== Calgary ====
- École de la Rose Sauvage (7-12)
- École de la Source (K-6)
- École De L'Horizon (K-6)
- École du Nouveau-Monde (K-6)
- École La Mosaïque (K-6)
- École secondaire Le Phare (7-12)
- École Terre des Jeunes (K-6)

=== Catholic ===
- École Notre-Dame-de-la-Paix, Calgary (K-6)
- École Notre-Dame des Monts, Canmore (K-12)
- École Notre-Dame des Vallées, Cochrane (K-12)
- École Sainte-Marguerite-Bourgeoys, Calgary (K-9)

== See also ==
- List of school authorities in Alberta
