= Red Deer Catholic Regional Division No. 39 =

Separate school authority in Alberta, Canada

Red Deer Catholic Regional Division No. 39 Red Deer Catholic Regional Schools

Location
- 5210 - 61 Street; Red Deer, Alberta, Canada Canada

Other information
- Website: www.rdcrs.ca

Red Deer Catholic Regional Division No. 39 or Red Deer Catholic Regional Schools (RDCRS) is a separate school authority within the Canadian province of Alberta operated out of Red Deer.

Red Deer Catholic Regional Schools is a publicly funded school Division with an elected Board of Trustees and governed by the Alberta Education Act. It serves over 10,650 students in 21 schools including an online school and an outreach school. It also serves approximately 850 students in a home education program. Its schools are located in Red Deer, Sylvan Lake, Blackfalds. Rocky Mountain House, Innisfail and Olds.

Red Deer Catholic Regional Schools also has an International Student Services program. Since its inception in 2004, the RDCRS International Student Services program has hosted students from a variety of countries, with the majority coming from Latin America, Asia and Europe.

== Schools ==
Elementary
- École Camille J. Lerouge School (K–9)
- École Mother Teresa School (K–5)
- École Our Lady of the Rosary School (PreK–2)
- Father Henri Voisin School (K–5)
- Holy Family School (K–5)
- Maryview School (PreK–5)
- St. Elizabeth Seton School (K–5)
- St. Marguerite Bourgeoys School (PreK–5)
- St. Martin de Porres School (K–5)
- St. Patrick's Community School (K–9)
- St. Teresa of Avila School (PreK-5)
Middle school
- École Camille J. Lerouge School (K–9)
- St. Francis of Assisi Middle School (6–9)
- St. Gregory the Great Catholic School (PreK-9)
- St. Lorenzo Ruiz Middle School (6-9)
- St. Patrick's Community School (K–9)
- St. Thomas Aquinas Middle School (6–9)
Secondary/High school
- École Secondaire Notre Dame High School (10–12)
- St. Joseph's High School (10-12)

== See also ==
- List of school authorities in Alberta
