= Aspen View Public School Division No. 78 =

Public school district in Alberta, Canada

Aspen View Public School Division No. 78 Aspen View Schools

Location
- 3600 - 48 Avenue; Athabasca, Alberta, Canada Canada

Other information
- Website: www.aspenview.org

Aspen View Public School Division No. 78 or Aspen View Schools is a public school authority in the Canadian province of Alberta operated out of Athabasca.

== Schools ==
- Alternative Student Programming & Education Network, Athabasca (ASPEN)
- Boyle School, Boyle (PK-12)
- Edwin Parr Composite School, Athabasca (7-12)
- Grassland School, Grassland (PK-9)
- H.A. Kostash School, Smoky Lake
- Landing Trail Intermediate School, Athabasca
- Smith School, Smith (K-9)
- Thorhild Central School, Thorhild
- Vilna School, Vilna
- Whispering Hills Primary School, Athabasca

== See also ==
- List of school authorities in Alberta
