= Grande Prairie Public School Division =

School division in Alberta, Canada

Grande Prairie Public School Division (GPPSD)

Location
- Grande Prairie, Alberta Canada

District information
- Type: Public
- Motto: Every student succeeds.
- Grades: Preschool to Grade 12
- Established: Jan. 29, 1911
- Superintendent: Sandy McDonald
- Chair of the board: Joan Nellis
- Governing agency: Alberta Education
- Schools: 18

Students and staff
- Students: ~ 9,000
- Staff: ~ 1000

Other information
- Website: www.gppsd.ab.ca

Grande Prairie Public School Division, usually called the GPPSD, is a school division in Grande Prairie, Alberta, Canada since 1911. The GPPSD is responsible for delivering the Alberta provincial curriculum, as directed by the provincial ministry of education, Alberta Education, to over 9,000 students (preschool to grade 12) in eighteen schools. The division provides Programs of Choice for Preschool, full-time Kindergarten (KinderPAL), French immersion, Montessori, Christian education, sports-focused Academy, STEM, Music Gr. 5-8, International Baccalaureate, Apprenticeship and more.

== Trustees ==
The Board of Trustees, elected in the last municipal election in 2022, are:

Board Chair: Joan Nellis

Board Vice chair: Donna Koch

Trustees: Ray Buziak, Chris Johnston, Andre Oullette, and Rob Martin

== Schools ==
The Grande Prairie Public School Division is composed of 18 schools. As the City of Grande Prairie continues to grow, the Grande Prairie Public School has been growing along with it.

Attendance at GPPSD schools is determined by geographical attendance boundaries for all neighbourhood schools. Attendance at specialized Schools of Choice is open to students who reside anywhere in the city.

| School name | Grades | Programs of Choice | Location |
Elementary Schools
| Avondale School | K-6 | | 10226 108 Avenue |
| Hillside Community School | K-6 | STEM Learning (K-8) | 9410 106 Avenue |
| Maude Clifford Public School | K-6 | | 9206 Lakeland Drive |
| Swanavon School | K-6 | | 8908 100 Street |
Combined Elementary and Middle Schools
| Alexander Forbes School | K-8 | The Academy | 7240 Poplar Drive |
| Aspen Grove School | K-8 | Music (Gr. 5-8) The Academy | 9720 63rd Avenue |
| Crystal Park School | K-8 | STEM Learning (K-8) | 9351 116 Avenue |
| Derek Taylor Public School | K-8 | STEM Learning (K-8) Music Program (Gr. 5-8) The Academy | 7321 104A Street |
| I.V. Macklin Public School | K-8 | Music (Gr. 5-8) | 8876 108 Avenue |
| Isabel Campbell Public School | K-8 | The Academy | 7149 114 Street |
| Riverstone Public School | K-8 | | 8901 Willow Drive |
| Roy Bickell Public School | K-8 | Music (Gr. 5-8) | 10410 Royal Oaks Drive |
Secondary Schools
| Bridge Network Outreach School | 7-12 | Apprenticeship Program | 9625 Prairie Road |
| Charles Spencer High School | 9-12 | Apprenticeship Program French Immersion The Academy | 20 Knowledge Way |
| Grande Prairie Composite High School | 9-12 | International Baccalaureate Diploma Senior Trades (Registered Apprenticeship Program) The Academy (Athletics) | 10501 112 Ave |
Christian Education School
| Grande Prairie Christian School | K-9 | The Academy | 8202-110 Street |
French Immersion School
| École Montrose | Preschool-8 | Preschool Early French Immersion Late Entry French Immersion Music (Gr. 5-8) The Academy | 6431 98 Street |
Montessori School
| Parkside Montessori | Preschool-6 | Preschool Montessori Programming The Academy | 9617 91a Ave |

=== Schools of Choice ===
- French Immersion
- Montessori
- Christian Education
