= Buffalo Trail Public Schools Regional Division No. 28 =

School district in Alberta, Canada

Location
- 1041 10A Street; Wainwright, Alberta, Canada Canada

Other information
- Website: www.btps.ca

Buffalo Trail Public Schools Regional Division No. 28 or Buffalo Trail Public Schools is a public school authority within the Canadian province of Alberta operated out of Wainwright.

== Schools ==
- Amisk School, Amisk (K-3)
- Buffalo Trail Learning Hub, Vermilion
- Dewberry School, Dewberry (1-12)
- Dr. Folkins Community School, Chauvin (K-12)
- E.H. Walter School, Paradise Valley (ECS-12)
- Edgerton Public School, Edgerton (K-12)
- Hughenden School, Hughenden (4-12)
- Irma School, Irma (K-12)
- J.R. Robson School, Vermilion (7-12)
- Kitscoty Elementary School, Kitscoty (1-6)
- Kitscoty Jr/Sr High School, Kitscoty (7-12)
- Mannville School, Mannville (K-12)
- Marwayne Jubilee School, Marwayne (K-12)
- Provost Public School, Provost (K-12)
- Vermilion Elementary School, Vermilion (K-6)
- Wainwright Elementary School, Wainwright (K-6)
- Wainwright High School, Wainwright (7-12)

== Colony Schools (K-9) ==
- Autumn Leaf Colony School, Wainwright
- Creighton Colony School, Mannville
- Highland View Colony School, Hughenden
- Holt Colony School, Irma
- Percy Lake Colony School, Minburn County
- Ribstone Colony School, Edgerton
- Rosewood Colony School, Hughenden
- South Ferriby Colony, Marwayne

== See also ==
- List of school authorities in Alberta
