= Parkland School Division No. 70 =

School district in Alberta, Canada

Location
- 4603 - 48 Street; Stony Plain, Alberta, Canada Canada

Other information
- Website: www.psd.ca

Parkland School Division No. 70 or Parkland School Division is a public school authority within the Canadian province of Alberta operated out of Stony Plain.

== Schools ==
- Athabasca Delta Community School, Fort Chipewyan (K-12)
- Duffield School, Duffield (K-9)
- Entwistle School, Entwistle (K-9)
- Tomahawk School, Tomahawk (K-9)
- Wabamun School, Wabamun (K-9)

=== Spruce Grove ===
- Brookwood School (K-4)
- Copperhaven School (K-9)
- École Broxton Park School (K-9)
- Graminia School (K-9)
- Greystone Centennial Middle School (5-9)
- Millgrove School (K-4)
- Parkland Village School (K-6)
- Prescott Learning Centre (K-9)
- Spruce Grove Composite High School (10-12)
- Woodhaven Middle School (5-9)

=== Stony Plain ===
- Blueberry School (K-9)
- Connections For Learning (1-12)
- École Meridian Heights School (K-9)
- Forest Green School (K-6)
- High Park School (K-9)
- Memorial Composite High School (10-12)
- Muir Lake School (K-9)
- Westview School (K-9)

== See also ==
- List of school authorities in Alberta
