= High Prairie School Division =

Canadian public school authority

Location
- P.O. Box 870; High Prairie, Alberta, Canada T0G 1E0

District information
- Grades: K-12
- Superintendent: Murray Marran
- Chair of the board: Joy McGregor

Students and staff
- Students: 2935 (2022-23)

Other information
- Website: www.hpsd.ca

High Prairie School Division is a public school authority within the Canadian province of Alberta operated out of High Prairie. Located along the south side of Lesser Slave Lake, High Prairie School Division provides educational services to a population of over 23,000 people within its service region. The division operates 12 schools with approximately 3,000 students, 200 teachers, and over 140 support staff.

== Board of trustees ==
The Board of Trustees for High Prairie School Division is made up of 7 elected trustees across 4 wards. Ward 1 covers the hamlets of Falher, Donnelly, and surrounding communities. Ward 2 covers the Town of High Prairie and surrounding communities. Ward 3 covers the hamlets of Joussard and Kinuso and surrounding lake-shore communities. Ward 4 covers the Town of Slave Lake and surrounding communities.

Ward	Trustee	Elected
1	Karin Scholl	2004
1	Lynn Skrepnek	2013
2	Tammy Henkel	2021
2	Michael Strebchuk	2025
3	Lorraine Shelp	2017
4	Joy McGregor	2021
4	Steven Adams	2025

== Schools ==
High Prairie School Division operates 12 schools across northern Alberta. The schools are located in a region from Falher, Alberta to Slave Lake, Alberta.

Ward	School name	Location	Grade
1	École Routhier School	Falher	K-6
1	Georges P. Vanier School	Donnelly	7-12
2	High Prairie Elementary School	High Prairie	K-6
2	Prairie River Junior High School	High Prairie	7-9
2	E.W. Pratt High School	High Prairie	10-12
2	Prairie View Outreach School	High Prairie	10-12
3	Joussard School	Joussard	K-6
3	Kinuso School	Kinuso	K-12
4	C.J. Schurter School	Slave Lake	K-3
4	E.G. Wahlstrom School	Slave Lake	4-6
4	Roland Michener Secondary School	Slave Lake	7-12
4	Lakeside Outreach School	Slave Lake	10-12

== See also ==
- List of school authorities in Alberta
