= Wolf Creek School Division No. 72 =

School district in Alberta, Canada

Location
- 6000 Highway 2A; Ponoka, Alberta; T4J 1P6 Canada

Other information
- Website: www.wolfcreek.ab.ca

Wolf Creek School Division No. 72 or Wolf Creek Public Schools is a public school authority within the Canadian province of Alberta operated out of Ponoka.

== Schools ==
- Alix-MAC School, Alix (K-12)
- Bentley School, Bentley (K-12)
- Bluffton School, Bluffton (K-9)
- Clive School, Clive (K-9)
- Eckville Elementary School, Eckville (K-6)
- Eckville Junior/Senior High School, Eckville (7-12)
- Rimbey Elementary School, Rimbey (K-6)
- Rimbey Junior Senior High School, Rimbey (7-12)
- West Country Outreach School, Rimbey (7-12)

=== Blackfalds ===
- Iron Ridge Elementary Campus (PK-3)
- Iron Ridge Intermediate Campus (4-6)
- Iron Ridge Junior Campus (7-8)
- Iron Ridge Secondary Campus (9-12)

=== Lacombe ===
- Crestomere School (K-9)
- École James S. McCormick School (PK-3)
- École Lacombe Junior High School (7-9)
- École Lacombe Upper Elementary School (4-6)
- École Secondaire Lacombe Composite High School (10-12)
- Lacombe Outreach School (7-12)
- Terrace Ridge School (PK-6)

=== Ponoka ===
- BRICK Learning Centre (10-12)
- Mecca Glen School (K-9)
- Ponoka Elementary School (PK-6)
- Ponoka Secondary Campus (7-12)
- Wolf Creek Education Centre

=== Colony Schools ===
- Alix Colony School, Alix
- Bentley Colony School, Lacombe County
- Ferrybank Colony School, Ponoka
- Leedale Colony School, Leslieville
- Pleasant Valley Colony School, Lacombe County

== See also ==
- List of school authorities in Alberta
