= Canadian Rockies Regional Division No. 12 =

Public school authority in Alberta, Canada

Address
- 618 7th Avenue Canmore, Alberta; Canada
- Coordinates: 51°05′15″N 115°21′38″W

Other information
- Website: crps.ca

Canadian Rockies Regional Division No. 12 or Canadian Rockies Public Schools is a public school authority within the Canadian province of Alberta operated out of Canmore.

== Schools ==
Canadian Rockies Public Schools' of continuum grades are commonly found in two grade level groupings: kindergarten through grade three being Elementary and grades 7 through 12 being Secondary. Further, Secondary grade groupings can be broken into Middle School (4-8) and Senior High (9-12) schools. However, there are certain schools that include more than one grade level grouping or don't conform to the grouping system.

=== Elementary schools ===
Elementary Schools offer instruction from kindergarten to grade six, unless otherwise noted.

- Alpenglow School
- Banff Elementary School
- Elizabeth Rummel School (K–3)

=== Middle Schools ===
Middle Schools offer instruction from grades four to eight, unless otherwise noted.

- Lawrence Grassi Middle School

==== Secondary schools ====
Secondary Schools (combined Junior/Senior High) offer instruction from grade seven through twelve, and offer 10, 20 and 30 level courses, unless otherwise noted.

- Banff Community High School

=== Senior High Schools ===
Senior High Schools offer instruction for grades nine, ten, eleven, and twelve, and offer 10, 20 and 30 level courses, unless otherwise noted.

- Canmore Collegiate High School

=== Combined Schools ===
==== Combined Elementary/Middle Schools ====
Combined Elementary/Middle Schools offer instruction from kindergarten through grade eight, unless otherwise noted.

- Exshaw School

==== Secondary schools ====
Secondary Schools (combined Junior/Senior High) offer instruction from grade seven through twelve, and offer 10, 20 and 30 level courses, unless otherwise noted.

- Banff Community High School

=== Other schools ===
- Canadian Rockies Outdoor Learning Centre

== See also ==
- List of school authorities in Alberta
