= Lloydminster Public School Division =

School district in Alberta and Saskatchewan, Canada

Location
- 5017 - 46 Street; Lloydminster, Alberta, Canada Canada
- Coordinates: 53.2795°N 110.0075°W

Students and staff
- Students: 4,091 (2025)

Other information
- Website: www.lpsd.ca

Lloydminster Public School Division is a public school authority within the Canadian provinces of Alberta and Saskatchewan operated out of Lloydminster.

== Schools ==
=== Lloydminster, Alberta ===
- Avery Outreach School (9-12)
- Bishop Lloyd Middle School (6-8)
- College Park School (K-8)
- Lloydminster Comprehensive High School (9-12)
- Queen Elizabeth School (K-5)
- Rendell Park Elementary School (K-5)

=== Lloydminster, Saskatchewan ===
- E.S. Laird Middle School (6-8)
- Jack Kemp Community School (PK-5)
- The Pursuit School of Sport (6-12)
- Winston Churchill School (PK-5)

== See also ==
- List of school authorities in Alberta
