= Red Deer Public School District =

Alberta, Canada school district

Red Deer Public School District RDPSD

Location
- 4747 - 53 Street, Red Deer, Alberta City of Red Deer Canada
- Coordinates: 52°16′17″N 113°48′26″W

District information
- Superintendent: Chad Erickson
- Chair of the board: Nicole Buchanan
- Schools: 28

Students and staff
- Students: approximately 11,000

Other information
- Elected trustees: Bill Christie; Laurette Woodward; Nicole Buchanan; Dianne Macaulay; Bev Manning; Cathy Peacocke; Bill Stuebing
- Website: www.rdpsd.ab.ca

Red Deer Public Schools, also known as Public School District No. 104 or the Red Deer Public School District is responsible for public education in the city of Red Deer, Alberta.

== Schools ==
- Gateway Christian School (K-12)

=== Elementary schools ===
- Annie L. Gaetz Elementary School
- Aspen Heights Elementary School
- Barrie Wilson Elementary School
- Don Campbell Elementary School
- Fairview Elementary School
- GW Smith Elementary School
- Joseph Welsh Elementary School
- Mattie McCullough Elementary School
- Mountview Elementary School
- Oriole Park Elementary School
- West Park Elementary School

=== K-8 schools ===
- GH Dawe School
- Glendale Sciences and Technology School
- Normandeau School
- Vista Grande (Spanish Bilingual Program)

=== Middle schools ===
- Central Middle School
- Eastview Middle School
- Westpark Middle School

=== High schools ===
- Hunting Hills High School
- Lindsay Thurber Comprehensive High School
- Pines Alternative School
