= John Maland High School =

Location
- 105 Athabasca Avenue; Devon, Alberta, T9G 1A4; Canada; 53.3655°N 113.7194°W

Information
- School type: Secondary school
- School board: Black Gold School Division
- Superintendent: Michael Borgfjord
- Principal: Jon Ganton
- Grades: 10-12
- Enrollment: 355
- Language: English
- Mascot: Wildcat
- Team name: Wildcats
- Website: jmhs.blackgold.ca

John Maland High School is located in Devon, Alberta, Canada. It teaches students from Grade 10–12. The current principal is Jon Ganton.
