= Golden Hills School Division No. 75 =

School district in Alberta, Canada

Golden Hills School Division No. 75 Golden Hills School Division

Location
- 435A Highway #1; Strathmore, Alberta, Canada Canada

Other information
- Website: www.ghsd75.com

Golden Hills School Division No. 75 or Golden Hills School Division is a public school authority within the Canadian province of Alberta operated out of Strathmore.

== Schools ==
- Acme School, Acme (K-6, 10-12)
- Carbon School, Carbon (K-9)
- Carseland School, Carseland (K-6)
- Dr. Elliott School, Linden (K-9)
- Drumheller Outreach, Drumheller (10-Adult)
- Drumheller Valley Secondary School, Drumheller (7-12)
- Greentree Elementary School, Drumheller (K-6)
- NorthStar Academy, Red Deer County (K-12)
- Prairie Christian Academy, Three Hills (K-12)
- Three Hills School, Three Hills (K-12)
- Trochu Valley School, Trochu (K-12)
- Wheatland Crossing School, Standard (K-12)

=== Strathmore ===
- Crowther Memorial Junior High School (7-9)
- École Brentwood Elementary School (K-6)
- George Freeman School (K-9)
- Golden Hills Learning Academy (K-12)
- Strathmore High School (10-12)
- Strathmore StoreFront School (10-12)
- Trinity Christian Academy (PK-9)
- Westmount School (K-6)

== See also ==
- List of school authorities in Alberta
