= Northland School Division No. 61 =

Public school authority in Alberta, Canada

The Northland School Division

Location
- 9809 - 77 Avenue; Peace River, Alberta, Canada Canada

Other information
- Website: www.nsd61.ca

Northland School Division No. 61 is a public school authority within the Canadian province of Alberta operated out of Peace River.

== Schools ==
- Anzac Community School/Bill Woodward School, Anzac (K-5, 6-12)
- Bishop Routhier School, High Prairie (PK-7)
- Calling Lake School, Calling Lake (K-12)
- Career Pathways Outreach School, Wabasca (10-12)
- Chipewyan Lake School, Wabasca (K-9)
- Conklin Community School, Conklin (K-12)
- Elizabeth School, Cold Lake (PK-9)
- Father R. Perin School, Janvier (PK-9)
- Gift Lake School, Gift Lake (PK-10)
- Grouard Northland School, Grouard (K-11)
- Hillview School, High Prairie (K-6)
- Mistassiniy School, Wabasca (7-12)
- Northland Online School (K-12)
- Paddle Prairie School, Paddle Prairie (K-12)
- St. Theresa School, Wabasca (K-6)
- Susa Creek School, Grande Cache (K-8)

== See also ==
- List of school authorities in Alberta
