= Ardrossan Junior Senior High School =

Location
- 53129 Range Road 222; Ardrossan, Alberta, T8E 2M8; Canada

Information
- School type: Public secondary
- Motto: Dream, Believe, Achieve! / Rêvez, Croyez, Accomplissez!
- Founded: 1958
- School board: EIPS (Elk Island Public Schools)
- Superintendent: Sandra Stoddard
- Principal: Mr. Leatherdale
- Grades: 7-12
- Enrollment: 823
- Language: English, French
- Colours: Blue and White
- Team name: Bisons
- Website: ardrossan.ca

Ardrossan Junior Senior High School is a public junior high and senior high school located in Ardrossan, Alberta, Canada. It is a bilingual school that offers a French immersion program from grades seven to twelve.
