= Blessed Sacrament School (Wainwright, Alberta) =

Coordinates: 52.832°N 110.850°W

Location
- 1321 - 4th Avenue; Wainwright, Alberta, T9W 2R7; Canada

Information
- School type: K-12
- Motto: "Palma Non Sine Pulvere" ("No Reward Without Effort")
- Founded: c. 1933
- School board: East Central Alberta Catholic School Board
- Superintendent: Charlie McCormack
- Principal: Mark DeJong
- Grades: K–12
- Enrollment: approx. 700 students
- Language: English, French
- Team name: BSS Thunder
- Website: www.bss.ecacs16.ab.ca

Blessed Sacrament School is located in Wainwright, Alberta, Canada. BSS is a K-12 school that serves about 700 students. It presently has a Junior Kindergarten available for ages 3–5, titled Little Steps. The school team is the THUNDER. The school was built in 1933, and was rehabbed by early 2004 due to fire on September 26, 2001.
