= Northern Lights School Division No. 69 =

School district in Alberta, Canada

Location
- 6005 - 50 Avenue; Bonnyville, Alberta, Canada Canada

Other information
- Website: www.nlsd.ab.ca

Northern Lights Public Schools, legally known as Northern Lights School Division No. 69, is a public school authority within the Canadian province of Alberta operated out of Bonnyville.

== Schools ==
- Ardmore School, Ardmore (PK-9)
- Caslan School, Caslan (K-8)
- Crossroads Outreach School, Buffalo Lake Metis Settlement (10-12)
- École Plamondon School, Plamondon (PK-12)
- Glendon School, Glendon
- Iron River School, Iron River (PK-9)
- Journeys Learning Academy, Kikino (10-12)
- Kikino School, Kilkino (K-8)
- Wandering River School, Wandering River (PK-6)

=== Bonnyville ===
- Bonnyville Centralized High School (9-12)
- Bonnyville Outreach School (10-12)
- Duclos School (PK-4)
- H.E. Bourgoin School (5-8)
- Learning Together Anywhere (K-9)

=== Cold Lake ===
- Art Smith Aviation Academy (K-9)
- Cold Lake Elementary School (PK-3)
- Cold Lake High School (10-12)
- Cold Lake Junior High School (7-9)
- Cold Lake Outreach School (10-12)
- Nelson Heights Middle School (4-6)
- North Star Elementary School (PK-6)

=== Lac La Biche ===
- Aurora Middle School (4-8)
- J.A. Williams High School (9-12)
- Lac La Biche Outreach School (10-12)
- Vera M. Welsh Elementary School (PK-3)

== See also ==
- List of school authorities in Alberta
