= Grasslands Regional Division No. 6 =

School district in Alberta, Canada

Grasslands Regional Division No. 6 Grasslands Public Schools

Location
- 745 2nd Avenue East; Brooks, Alberta, Canada Canada

Other information
- Website: www.grasslands.ab.ca

Grasslands Regional Division No. 6 or Grasslands Public Schools is a public school authority within the Canadian province of Alberta operated out of Brooks.

== Schools ==
- Alcoma School, Rainier (K-9)
- Bassano School, Bassano (K-12)
- Duchess School, Duchess (K-12)
- Gem School, Gem (1-6)
- Rolling Hills School, Rolling Hills (K-9)
- Rosemary School, Rosemary (K-12)
- Tilley School, Tilley (K-9)

=== Brooks ===
- Brooks Composite High School (10-12)
- Brooks Junior High School (7-9)
- Eastbrook Elementary School (K-6)
- Griffin Park School (K-6)
- Sunrise Collegiate (Adult)
- Sunrise School (6-12)
- Uplands Elementary School (K-6)

=== Colony Schools ===
- Bow City Colony School
- Clearview Colony School
- Fairville Colony School
- Lathom Colony School
- Newell Colony School
- Springside Colony School
- Springview Colony School

== See also ==
- List of school authorities in Alberta
