= Medicine Hat Public School Division =

School district in Alberta, Canada

Location
- 601 1 Avenue SW; Medicine Hat, Alberta Canada
- Coordinates: 50°2′0″N 110°41′29″W

District information
- Superintendent: Tracy Hensel
- Chair of the board: Terry Riley
- Schools: 17
- Budget: CA$91 million (2018-2019)

Students and staff
- Students: 7,440 (approx.)

Other information
- Elected trustees: Deborah Forbes; Rick Massini; Terry Riley; Catherine Wilson; Carolyn Freeman; Celina Symmonds
- Website: www.mhpsd.ca

Medicine Hat Public School Division (MHPSD), formerly known as Medicine Hat Public School District No. 76, is the public school board in Medicine Hat, Alberta, Canada.

== Size ==
Medicine Hat Public School Division operates 15 schools covering grades ranging from Kindergarten to Grade 12. Enrolment for 2008/2009 was 6,370 students. As well, the school district operates three outreach programs/schools. The operating budget was $60.2 million for the 2008-2009 fiscal year.

== Partners ==
Medicine Hat Public School Division works with BHTH Institution to operate international education program since 2013.

== Schools ==
Elementary schools

- Connaught School
- Crestwood School
- Dr. Ken Sauer School
- Dr Roy Wilson Learning Centre
- Elm Street School
- George Davison School
- Herald School
- River Heights School
- Riverside School
- Ross Glen School
- Southview Community School
- Medicine Hat Christian School
- Vincent Massey School
- Webster Niblock School
- Alexandra Middle School
- Crescent Heights High School
- Medicine Hat High School
