= Wild Rose School Division No. 66 =

School district in Alberta, Canada

Wild Rose School Division No. 66 Wild Rose School Division

Location
- 4912 - 43 Street; Rocky Mountain House, Alberta, Canada Canada

Other information
- Website: www.wrsd.ca

Wild Rose School Division No. 66 or Wild Rose School Division is a public school authority within the Canadian province of Alberta operated out of Rocky Mountain House.

== Schools ==
- Breton Elementary School, Breton (K-6)
- Breton High School, Warburg (7-12)
- Caroline School, Caroline (K-12)
- Charlotte Small Elementary School, Condor (PK-6)
- David Thompson High School, Leslieville (7-12)

=== Drayton Valley ===
- Aurora Elementary School (PK-4)
- Drayton Christian School (K-8)
- Drayton Valley Community Outreach School (10-12)
- Evergreen Elementary School (PK-4)
- Frank Maddock High School (9-12)
- H.W. Pickup School (5-8)

=== Rocky Mountain House ===
- École Rocky Elementary School (PK-5)
- Lochearn Elementary School (PK-5)
- Pioneer Middle School (6-8)
- Rocky Christian School (PK-9)
- Visions West Outreach School (10-12)
- West Central High School (10-12)

== See also ==
- List of school authorities in Alberta
