= Silver Valley, Alberta =

Coordinates: 56°02′34″N 119°34′08″W

Location of Silver Valley Alberta

Silver Valley is an unincorporated community in northern Alberta within Saddle Hills County, located 76 kilometres (47 mi) north of Highway 43, 110 kilometres (68 mi) northwest of Grande Prairie. The area was first opened for homesteaders in 1952.
