= Prairie Land Regional Division No. 25 =

School district in Alberta, Canada

Location
- Box 670; Hanna, Alberta, Canada Canada

Other information
- Website: www.plrd.ab.ca

Prairie Land Regional Division No. 25 is a public school authority within the Canadian province of Alberta operated out of Hanna.

== Schools ==
=== Community Schools ===
- Altario School, Altario
- Berry Creek Community School, Cessford
- Consort School, Consort
- Delia School, Delia
- J.C. Charyk Hanna School, Hanna
- Morrin School, Morrin
- Veteran School, Veteran
- Youngstown School, Youngstown

=== Alternative/Faith-based Schools ===
- Al-Amal Academy, Calgary
- Al-Amal Online Academy
- Green Dome Islamic School, Calgary
- Hope Christian School, Vulcan
- Prairie Land Online Academy
- Prairie Land Outreach School, Hanna

=== Colonies of Hutterian Brethren ===
- Blue Sky Colony School
- Cloverleaf Colony School
- Craigmyle Colony School
- East River Colony School
- Handhills Colony School
- Neu Muehl Colony School
- Stahl Colony School
- Starland Colony School
- Verdant Valley Colony School
- Veteran Colony School
- Wind River Colony School

== See also ==
- List of school authorities in Alberta
