= Fort McMurray Catholic School District =

School district in Alberta, Canada

Fort McMurray Roman Catholic Separate School Division No. 32

Location
- 9809 Main Street; Fort McMurray, Alberta; T9H 1T7 Canada
- Coordinates: 56°43′34″N 111°23′00″W

District information
- Grades: K-12
- Superintendent: Natasha MacArthur-Poole
- Chair of the board: Cathie Langmead
- Schools: 13

Students and staff
- Students: 6,600 (as of 2020)

Other information
- Elected trustees: Paula Galenzoski; Tim Byron; Anthony Hoffman; Kelsey Janvier; Cathie Langmead
- Website: www.fmcschools.ca

Fort McMurray Roman Catholic Separate School Division No. 32 or the Fort McMurray Catholic School Division (FMCSD) is the Catholic school board in Fort McMurray, Alberta, Canada.

== Schools ==
There are a total of thirteen schools operating under the Fort McMurray Catholic School Division, featuring a Science and Technology Centre located at Father Patrick Mercredi Community High School, and a Performing Arts Theatre located at Holy Trinity Catholic High School.

- Elementary schools (K-6)
  - St. Martha School
  - Our Lady of the Rivers Catholic School
  - Good Shepherd School
  - Father Beauregard School
  - Ecole St. Paul School
  - St. Gabriel School
  - Sister Mary Phillips School
  - St. Anne School
  - St. Kateri School
  - Elsie Yanik Catholic School
- Secondary schools (7–12)
  - Father Patrick Mercredi Catholic High School
  - Holy Trinity Catholic High School
  - Immaculate Heart of Mary Catholic High School - Outreach

== See also ==
- List of Alberta school boards
- Fort McMurray Public School District
