= Evergreen Catholic Separate School Division =

School district in Alberta, Canada

Location
- Suite 110, 381 Grove Drive; Spruce Grove, Alberta, Canada Canada

District information
- Schools: 10

Other information
- Website: www.ecsrd.ca

Evergreen Catholic Separate School Division or Evergreen Catholic Schools is a separate school authority within the Canadian province of Alberta operated out of Spruce Grove.

== Schools ==
- Spruce Grove

St. Joseph Catholic School Pre-Kindergarten to Grade 4, St. Marguerite Catholic School Kindergarten to Grade 4, St. Peter the Apostle Catholic High School Grades 9-12, St. Teresa Catholic Learning Centre Grades 7-12, St. Thomas the Aquinas Catholic School Grades 5-8

- Stony Plain

St. John Paul II Catholic School Kindergarten to Grade 8

- Westlock

St. Mary School Pre-Kindergarten to Grade 12

- Hinton

St. Gregory Catholic School Pre-Kindergarten to Grade 4, Father Gerard Redmond Community Catholic School Grades 5 to 12

- Devon

Holy Spirit Catholic School Pre-Kindergarten to Grade 8

== See also ==
- List of school authorities in Alberta
