= Pinkham =

Pinkham may refer to:

== People ==
- Bryce Pinkham (born 1982), American stage and television actor
- Charles Pinkham (politician) (1853–1938), English politician
- Charles H. Pinkham (1844–1920), American soldier
- Cyprian Pinkham (1844–1928), Anglican Bishop of Saskatchewan
- Daniel Pinkham (1923–2006), American composer, organist, and harpsichordist
- Dora Pinkham (1891–1941), American politician in Maine
- Ed Pinkham (American football) (born 1953), American college football coach
- Ed Pinkham (baseball) (1846–1906), American baseball player
- Louis Pinkham (1888–1919), American football player and coach
- Lucius E. Pinkham (1850–1922), fourth Territorial Governor of Hawaii
- Lydia Pinkham (1819–1883), American patent medicine manufacturer and businesswoman
- Mary Ellen Pinkham (contemporary), American humor columnist and author
- Natalie Pinkham (born 1977), British television presenter
- Sam Pinkham (contemporary), English broadcaster
- Albert Pinkham Ryder (1847–1917), American painter

== Places ==
- Pinkham Notch, mountain pass in Coös County, New Hampshire
- Pinkham's Grant, New Hampshire, township in Coös County, New Hampshire
- Bishop Pinkham Junior High School, a public junior high school in Calgary, Alberta
- 19419 Pinkham, a minor planet discovered in 1998

== Structures ==
- Daniel Pinkham House, in Portsmouth, New Hampshire
- Lydia Pinkham House, in Lynn, Massachusetts
- Pinkham House, in Quincy, Massachusetts
- Richard Pinkham House, in Medford, Massachusetts

== See also ==
- Pincham
