= List of school authorities in Alberta =

The Canadian province of Alberta has 63 school authorities, which are sometimes referred to as school boards, school districts, or school divisions. Types include public school, separate school and francophone school authorities. There are also charter schools and private schools that act as their own authorities, as well as schools under the authority of early childhood services (ECS), private operators, and Federal Indian Affairs. Alberta's school authorities report to Alberta Education.

== School authority types ==
=== Public ===
Alberta has 42 public school authorities.

- Aspen View Public School Division No. 78
- Battle River Regional Division No. 31
- Black Gold Regional Division No. 18
- Buffalo Trail Public Schools Regional Division No. 28
- Calgary School District No. 19
- Canadian Rockies Regional Division No. 12
- Chinook's Edge School Division No. 73
- Clearview School Division No. 71
- Edmonton School District No. 7
- Elk Island Public Schools Regional Division No. 14
- Foothills School Division No. 38
- Fort McMurray Public School District No. 2833
- Fort Vermilion School Division No. 52
- Golden Hills School Division No. 75
- Grande Prairie School District No. 2357
- Grande Yellowhead Public School Division No. 77
- Grasslands Regional Division No. 6
- High Prairie School Division No. 48
- Horizon School Division No. 67
- Lethbridge School District No. 51
- Livingstone Range School Division No. 68
- Lloydminster Public School Division
- Medicine Hat School District No. 76
- Northern Gateway Regional Division No. 10
- Northern Lights School Division No. 69
- Northland School Division No. 61
- Palliser Regional Division No. 26
- Parkland School Division No. 70
- Peace River School Division No. 10
- Peace Wapiti School Division No. 76
- Pembina Hills Regional Division No. 7
- Prairie Land Regional Division No. 25
- Prairie Rose School Division No. 8
- Red Deer Public School District No. 104
- Rocky View School Division No. 41
- St. Albert Public School District No. 5565
- St. Paul Education Regional Division No. 1
- Sturgeon School Division No. 24
- Westwind School Division No. 74
- Wetaskiwin Regional Division No. 11
- Wild Rose School Division No. 66
- Wolf Creek School Division No. 72

=== Private ===
Alberta has 153 private school authorities.

=== Separate ===
Alberta has 17 separate school authorities.

- Calgary Roman Catholic Separate School District No. 1
- Christ the Redeemer Catholic Separate Regional Division No. 3
- East Central Alberta Catholic Separate Schools Regional Division No. 16
- Edmonton Catholic Separate School District No. 7
- Elk Island Catholic Separate Regional Division No. 41
- Evergreen Catholic Separate Regional Division No. 2
- Fort McMurray Roman Catholic Separate School Division No. 32
- Grande Prairie Roman Catholic Separate School District No. 28
- Greater St. Albert Roman Catholic Separate School District No. 734
- Holy Family Catholic Regional Division No. 37
- Holy Spirit Roman Catholic Separate Regional Division No. 4
- Lakeland Roman Catholic Separate School District No. 150
- Living Waters Catholic Regional Division No. 42
- Lloydminster Roman Catholic Separate School Division
- Medicine Hat Catholic Separate Regional Division No. 20
- Red Deer Catholic Regional Division No. 39
- St. Thomas Aquinas Roman Catholic Separate Regional Division No. 38

=== Francophone ===
After a 1990 Supreme Court decision, based on the Canadian Charter of Rights and Freedoms minority language rights provisions, Alberta established francophone school authorities to allow francophone communities to administer their own schools, and provide French language instruction, wherever numbers warrant.

Alberta has four francophone school authorities.

- East Central Francophone Education Region No. 3
- Greater North Central Francophone Education Region No. 2
- Northwest Francophone Education Region No. 1
- The Southern Francophone Education Region No. 4

=== Charter ===
Charter schools are independent of district school authorities and do not have public oversight. Each has its own board with powers similar to a district authority, but limited to a single school.

Alberta has 21 charter school authorities which operate a total of 36 schools.

- Alberta Classical Academy Ltd.
- Almadina School Society
- Aurora School Ltd.
- Boyle Street Education Centre
- Calgary Arts Academy Society
- Calgary Girls' Charter School Society
- CAPE - Centre for Academic and Personal Excellence Institute
- Connect Charter School Society
- Foundations for the Future Charter Academy (FFCA) Charter School Society
- Fusion Education Association
- Gwynne Valley Rural Education Association
- Holden Rural Academy Society
- Mother Earth's Children's Charter School Society
- New Horizons Charter School Society
- New Humble Community School
- STEM Collegiate Canada Society
- STEM Innovation Academy Society
- Suzuki Charter School Society
- Thrive Charter School
- Valhalla School Foundation
- Westmount Charter School Society

== See also ==
- Public School Boards' Association of Alberta
- Ukrainian Bilingual Program
