= Lakeview, Calgary =

Lakeview
- Neighbourhood
- Location of Lakeview in Calgary
- Coordinates: 50°59′41″N 114°08′28″W
- Country: Canada
- Province: Alberta
- City: Calgary
- Quadrant: SW
- Ward: 11
- Established: 1962
- Annexed: 1956

Government
  - Mayor: Jeromy Farkas
  - Administrative body: Calgary City Council
  - Councillor: Rob Ward (Communities First)

Area
  - Total: 2.3 km^{2} (0.89 sq mi)
- Elevation: 1,100 m (3,600 ft)

Population (2006)
  - Total: 5,581
  - Average Income: $110,824
- Postal code: T3E
- Website: lakeviewcommunity.org

Lakeview is a residential community in the southwestern quadrant of Calgary, Alberta, Canada.

Nestled between Glenmore Trail Sw and Crowchild Trail SW to 37th Street SW, the western city limits at this point. The Tsuu T'ina Nation Indian reserve borders it to the west.

Residences south of 66th Avenue are part of a smaller development named Lakeview Village, which features larger, more expensive homes. East of Crowchild Trail SW with the Earl Grey Golf Course, Longridge Drive and 50th Ave SW, North Glenmore Park is often mistakenly referred to as Lakeview. The community was built in 1960.

== History ==
The community was founded in 1962, six years after the city of Calgary annexed the land it was built on. The name Lakeview was chosen because of the view of Glenmore Reservoir its location afforded. Many of the original homes were built by Engineered Homes Ltd. of Calgary.

== Amenities ==
The Calgary Rowing Club and Calgary Canoe Club are located in the south of the community, adjacent to the Glenmore Reservoir. Numerous hiking and cycling trails are maintained on the shores of the Reservoir, between the Weaselhead flats and Glenmore Trail.

== Demographics ==
In the City of Calgary's 2012 municipal census, Lakeview had a population of 5,468 living in 2,338 dwellings, a -0.6% increase from its 2011 population of 5,501. With a land area of 2.2 km^{2} (0.85 sq mi), it had a population density of 2,490/km^{2} (6,440/sq mi) in 2012.

Residents in this community had a median household income of $64,535 in 2000, and there were 5.2% low income residents living in the neighbourhood. The neighbourhood is represented in the Calgary City Council by the Ward 11 councillor.

As of 2015, the median household income (before tax) was reported as $110,824.

Unusually, residents living east of 30th Street may also have membership with the neighbouring North Glenmore Park Community Association.

== Education ==
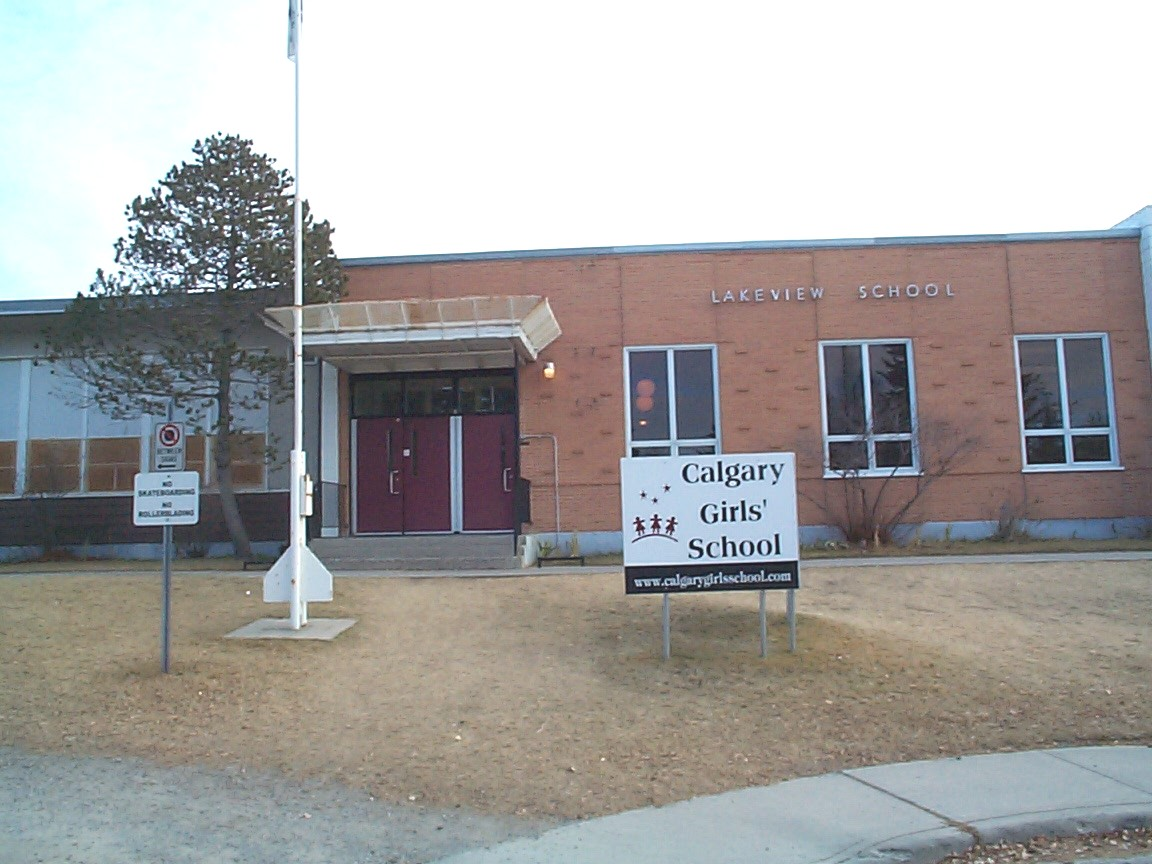
Lakeview School building was closed and re-opened as Calgary Girls' School (a charter school)

The main schools in this community are:

- Connect Charter School
- Bishop Pinkham Junior High School
- Jennie Elliott Elementary School
- Calgary Girls' School

The closest separate school is St.James Elementary & Junior High School

== See also ==
- List of neighbourhoods in Calgary
