= BSEC (disambiguation) =

The BSEC is an international economic organization.

BSEC may also refer to:

- Bangladesh Securities and Exchange Commission, the regulator of the capital market of Bangladesh
- Bendigo South East College, an Australian secondary school
- Boyle Street Education Centre, a Canadian charter school
- Brightwater Science and Environmental Centre, a Canadian nature reserve
