= Medicine Hat =

Medicine Hat City of Medicine Hat
- City
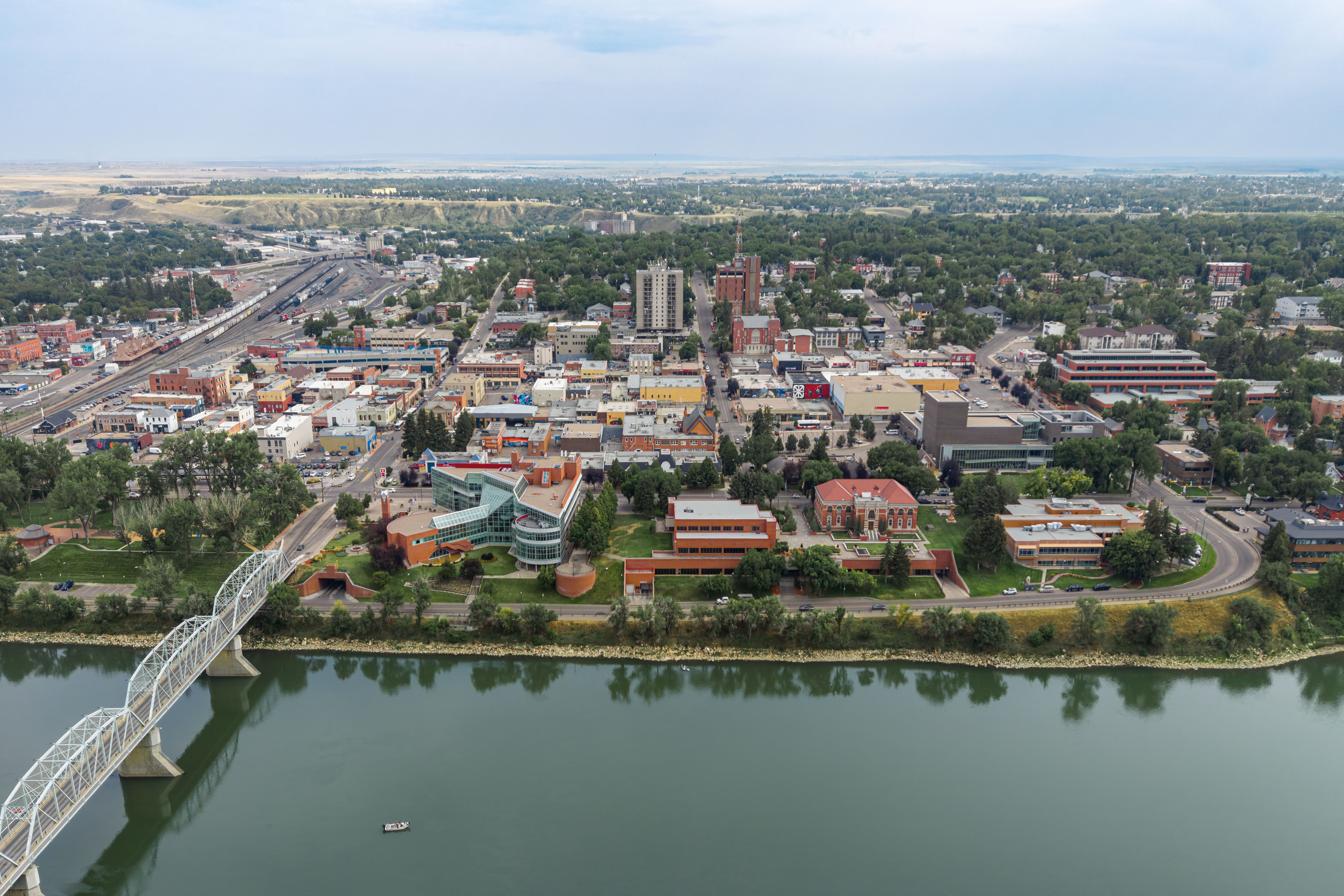
- Downtown Medicine Hat along the South Saskatchewan River

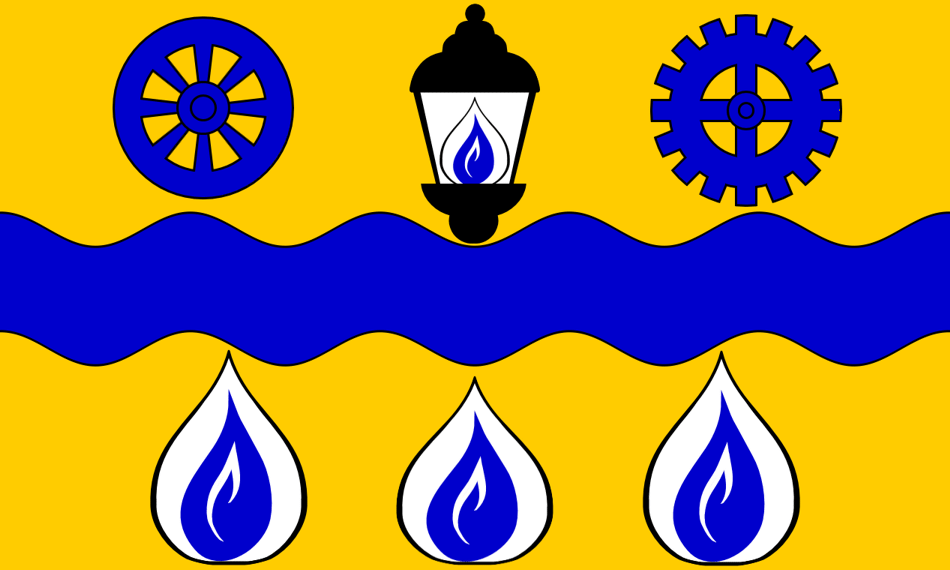
- Flag Coat of arms Logo
- Nicknames: "The Hat", "The Gas City", "Saamis"
- Motto(s): Animo et Fide (Latin) "By Courage and Faith"
- City boundaries

- Location in Alberta Location in Canada Location in Cypress County
- Coordinates: 50°02′27″N 110°40′36″W
- Country: Canada
- Province: Alberta
- Planning region: South Saskatchewan
- Municipal district: Cypress County
- Founded: 1883
- Incorporated
  - Village: May 31, 1894
  - Town: November 1, 1898
  - City: May 9, 1906

Government
  - Mayor: Linnsie Clark
  - Governing body: Medicine Hat City Council: Yusuf Mohammed; Ted Clugston; Stuart Young; Chris Hellman; Bill Cocks; Cheryl Phaff; Dan Reynish; Brian Varga
  - CAO: Ann Mitchell
  - MP: Glen Motz
  - MLAs: Justin Wright; Danielle Smith

Area (2021)
  - Total: 125.01 km^{2} (48.27 sq mi)
  - Land: 111.97 km^{2} (43.23 sq mi)
- Elevation: 690 m (2,260 ft)

Population (2021)
  - Total: 63,271
  - Density: 565.1/km^{2} (1,464/sq mi)
  - Municipal census (2015): 63,018
  - Estimate (2020): 65,527
- Demonym: Hatter
- Time zone: UTC−06:00 (Alberta Time)
- Forward sortation areas: T1A - T1C
- Area codes: 368, 403, 587, 825
- Highways: 1, 3, 41A
- Waterways: South Saskatchewan River, Seven Persons Creek, Ross Creek
- Railways: Canadian Pacific Kansas City
- Website: medicinehat.ca

Medicine Hat is a city in southeast Alberta, Canada. It is located along the South Saskatchewan River, west of the Saskatchewan border. It is approximately 169 kilometres (105 mi) east of Lethbridge, and 295 km (183 mi) southeast of Calgary. The city and the adjacent Town of Redcliff to the northwest are within Cypress County. Medicine Hat was the eighth-largest city in Alberta in 2021 with a population of 63,271. It is also the sunniest place in Canada according to Environment and Climate Change Canada, averaging 2,544 hours of sunshine a year.

Started as a railway town, today, Medicine Hat is served by the Trans-Canada Highway (Highway 1) and the eastern terminus of the Crowsnest Highway (Highway 3). Nearby communities considered part of the Medicine Hat area include the Town of Redcliff (abutting the city's northwest boundary) and the hamlets of Desert Blume, Dunmore, Irvine, Seven Persons, and Veinerville. The Cypress Hills (including Cypress Hills Interprovincial Park) are a relatively short distance (by car) to the southeast of the city.

Historically, Medicine Hat has been known for its large natural gas fields, being immortalized by Rudyard Kipling as having "all hell for a basement". Because of these reserves, the city is known as "The Gas City".

In 2021, Medicine Hat became the first city in Canada to achieve "functional zero" chronic homelessness, defined as three consecutive months where three or fewer individuals experienced chronic homelessness. They were able to achieve this due to their adoption of a Housing First policy to combat homelessness beginning in 2009.

== History ==
=== Name origins and ancient history ===
The name "Medicine Hat" is an English interpretation of Saamis – the Blackfoot word for the eagle tail feather headdress worn by medicine men. Several legends are associated with the name of a mythical mer-man river serpent named Soy-yee-daa-bee – the Creator – who appeared to a hunter and instructed him to sacrifice his wife to get mystical powers which were manifested in a special hat. Another legend tells of a battle long ago between the Blackfoot and the Cree in which a retreating Cree "Medicine Man" lost his headdress in the South Saskatchewan River.

A number of natural factors have always made Medicine Hat a gathering place. The gently sloping valley with its converging waterways and hardy native cottonwood trees attracted both the migratory bison herds which passed through the area, and humans who used the waterways and hunted the bison. Before Europeans arrived, the historic Blackfoot, Cree and Assiniboine nations used the area for hundreds of years, and were preceded for thousands of years by previous indigenous cultures.

Beginning in 1971, archeological excavations supervised by scholars from Medicine Hat College (MHC) were conducted at what became known as Saamis Archeological Site along Seven Persons Creek, near a historic Blackfoot buffalo jump. These revealed numerous artifacts associated with bands of First Nations ancestors, known as the Old Women's Phase to archeologists. They found "quantities of stone tools, fire cracked rock, butchered bone and pottery", marking this as an important spot. Most of the bones were identified as bison. Additional excavations were conducted in 1972 and 1973, and a field school for college students was based there. They "excavated and mapped over 3,200 sq. ft. of living floors and nearly 80 features including hearths and stone boiling pits. Radiocarbon dates indicate the Saamis Site was initially occupied about AD 1500 and again around AD 1750", well before most European contact.

Also in this area, further to the west, other MHC students and faculty were part of an excavation in 2000 at what became known as the Hillside Campsite, where two layers of finds were made. The upper layer had artifacts from the Old Women's Phase, but the lower layers were found to be much older, containing Pelican Lake Phase remains that were dated to between 1000 and 1500 BC.

=== Modern founding ===
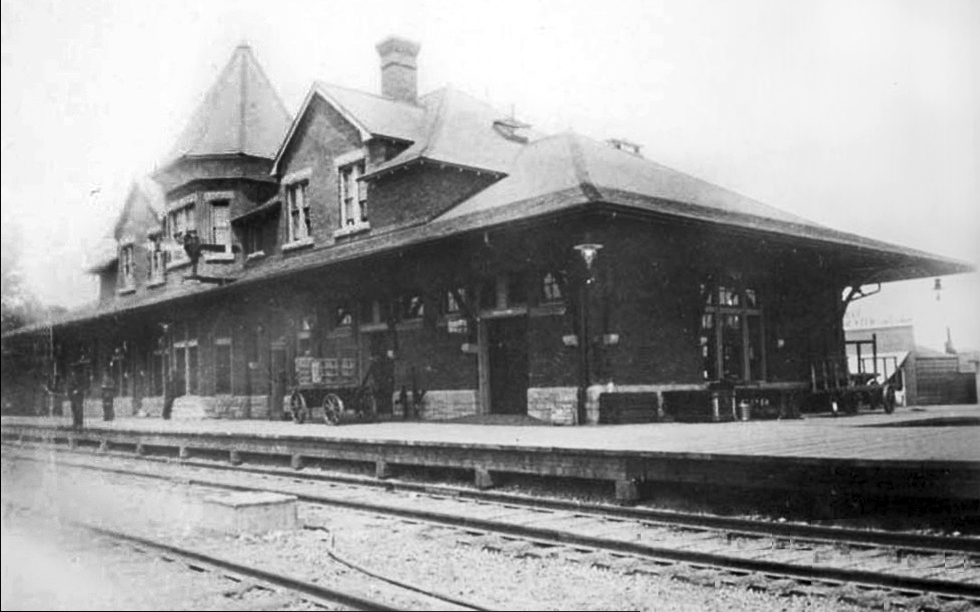
Canadian Pacific Railway Station (1906)

In 1883, when the Canadian Pacific Railway (CPR) reached Medicine Hat and crossed the river, European Canadians established a town site. They named it from the First Nations legends. As growth took place, in 1889 Medicine Hat built the first hospital west of Winnipeg. The CPR established this town as a railway divisional point. The frontier settlement was incorporated as a town on October 31, 1898. In 1905, when the province of Alberta was founded, it took in Medicine Hat, which had formerly been in the district of Assiniboia. Medicine Hat was incorporated as a city on May 9, 1906. The depot is still standing and has been a National Historic Site since 1992.

Medicine Hat is halfway between Winnipeg, Manitoba, and Vancouver, British Columbia, on the Pacific Coast.

=== Industrialization and growth ===
Rich in natural resources including natural gas, coal, clay, and farmland, the town became industrialized and was known in its early days as "the Pittsburgh of the West". A number of large industries located here, attracted by the cheap and plentiful energy resources. Coal mines, brick works, pottery and glass bottle manufacturing plants, flour mills, etc. became established. Altaglass, an art and functional glass production company operated in Medicine Hat from 1950 to 1988. With transportation access via the railway and river, the town became a service and trade center for the agriculture and its products, both commodity crops and livestock, of the surrounding area. Between 1909 and 1914 the town had an economic boom that increased the population to more than 10,000. Little growth occurred between the World Wars.

During World War II, one of the largest prisoner-of-war camps (POW) in Canada was established here in January 1943 and was used primarily to hold German and Italian prisoners until April 1946. It was not until the 1950s of the post-war period that the town again had commercial growth.

In the 21st century, Medicine Hat promotes its quality of life and affordable cost of living, enjoying the savings of a city-owned gas utility and power generation plant. Major industries have included chemical plants, a Goodyear tire and rubber plant, greenhouses, numerous oil and gas related companies, a foundry, I-XL Industries (a brickworks dating from the 1880s), to name a few. Friends of Medalta is a non-profit that has been formed to preserve some of the city's industrial heritage.

== Geography ==
The Medicine Hat landscape is dominated by the South Saskatchewan River valley. In addition, the tributaries Seven Persons Creek and Ross Creek both flow into the South Saskatchewan River within the boundaries of the city. These waterways have cut a dramatic valley landscape with numerous cliffs, and finger coulees throughout the city. Beyond the city and river valley, the land is flat to slightly rolling and is characterized by short-grass vegetation.

=== 2013 Alberta floods ===
During the 2013 Alberta floods Medicine Hat, located on the South Saskatchewan River downstream from the confluence of the Bow and Oldman Rivers was hit with significant flooding. The city evacuated 10,000 residents ahead of the flooding, and facilities including the Medicine Hat Arena had begun to flood late Sunday evening, June 23. The South Saskatchewan River peaked at 5,460 cubic metres per second (193,000 cu ft/s), which was below earlier predictions of 6,000 m^{3}/s (210,000 cu ft/s), but exceeded the highest recorded rate of 5,100 m^{3}/s (180,000 cu ft/s) in 1995.

=== Neighbourhoods ===
- Cottonwood – A community located above the Cottonwood golf course, between the light industrial area and the airport. Overlooks the World's Largest Teepee.
- Crescent Heights – Mainly built in the 1950s through to the 1960s. Located on the north side of city on the entire ridge above the river valley.
- Crestwood and Norwood – This is an older area of town mainly built in the 1950s. It is located on a plateau southeast of the South Flats and the Seven Person's Creek. The Medicine Hat Exhibition & Stampede grounds is within this area.
- Hamptons - A four-phase neighbourhood approved for development in 2005. It is located in south Medicine Hat, and is bounded by South Boundary Road to the south, 13 Avenue SE to the east, South Vista Heights to the west and South Ridge to the north. It features architectural controls implemented by the developer.
- North Flats / River Flats – The oldest area in Medicine Hat. Located northeast of the CPKC marshalling yards near the South Saskatchewan River and downtown. An inner-city neighbourhood that is home to residential and industrial uses. This area is in the east valley.
- Park Meadows – An area that was developed in the 1990s, adjacent to Crestwood. Primarily residential with several apartments.
- Parkview – A subdivision developed in the 1990s, and located north of the South Saskatchewan River. It is adjacent to Police Point Park and Medicine Hat Golf and Country Club.
- Ranchlands – A neighbourhood developed in the mid-2000s and located in the northeast sector of the city. The neighbourhood includes residential lands both above and in the South Saskatchewan River valley.
- River Heights – Located on the Southwest Hill north of the hospital, and south of the South Saskatchewan River. Includes River Heights Elementary School and an extended care wing, which was originally a part of the hospital.
- Riverside – A mature inner-city neighbourhood along the north bank of the South Saskatchewan River. The community has experienced gentrification. Mature trees line the boulevards and streets.
- Ross Glen – Low density middle-class neighbourhood located in the southeast end of the city. First developed in the late 1970s.
- Saamis Heights – Located west of South Ridge in the south sector of the city. Saamis Heights was developed in under five years. The community borders the Seven Person's Creek valley and thus provides some walkout view lots.
- South Flats – Located south of the CPKC marshalling yard, also in the valley, and adjacent to downtown.
- South Ridge – The first residential development south of the Trans-Canada Highway. First developed in the late 1970s. Adjacent to the World's Largest Teepee.
- South Vista Heights – A new residential suburban community south of the Trans-Canada Highway.
- Southeast Hill – One of the oldest areas of the city. It originally overlooked downtown on the north side of the hill and Kin Coulee on the south side. Originally this area housed CPR workers. It is home to four schools.
- Southlands – A community that opened in 2007. It is home to a significant regional commercial centre including Walmart, Staples, Canadian Tire and The Home Depot. The residential community includes parks, future school sites, many low-density residential lots, and several large multi-family sites.
- Southview – Located in the southeast part of the city between Ross Glen and Crestwood. First developed in the 1960s.
- Southwest Hill – Located west of Division Avenue next to the SE Hill area. It is home to five schools and the city's hospital.

==== Housing ====
The average home price in Medicine Hat in 2018 was $277,294.

=== Climate ===
Located in the steppe region known as Palliser's Triangle, Medicine Hat has a semi-arid climate (Köppen climate classification BSk), with cold winters, and warm to hot, dry summers. Frequently, the winter cold is ameliorated by mild and dry Chinook winds blowing from the west, and hot summer daytime temperatures are made more tolerable by low humidity and rapid cooling in the evening. As Medicine Hat receives less precipitation annually than most other cities on the Canadian Prairies and plentiful sunshine (it is widely known as "The sunniest city in Canada"), it is a popular retirement city. Maximum precipitation typically occurs in the late spring and early summer.

The highest temperature ever recorded in Medicine Hat was 42.2 °C (108.0 °F) on July 12, 1886. The coldest temperature ever recorded was −46.1 °C (−51.0 °F) on February 4, 1887.

Climate data for Medicine Hat (composite station threads (Note: Data is from; Medicine Hat AWOS; Climate ID:3034483; coordinates 50°01′08.1″N 110°43′15″W; elevation: 716.9 m (2,352 ft); Medicine Hat; WMO ID: 71247; TC ID: YXH; coordinates 50°01′08″N 110°43′15″W; elevation: 716.9 m (2,352 ft); Medicine Hat A Climate ID: 3034480; TC ID: YXH; coordinates 50°01′08″N 110°43′15″W; elevation: 716.9 m (2,352 ft); Medicine Hat RCS; WMO ID: 71026; TC ID: XMW; coordinates 50°01′30.4″N 110°43′02.1″W; elevation: 715 m (2,346 ft))) 1991−2020 normals, extremes 1883−present, sun 1981–2010
Month	Jan	Feb	Mar	Apr	May	Jun	Jul	Aug	Sep	Oct	Nov	Dec	Year
Record high humidex	16.5	20.9	25.4	30.5	37.0	39.0	42.3	41.1	38.4	30.7	23.5	17.2	42.3
Record high °C (°F)	18.3 (64.9)	21.1 (70.0)	28.9 (84.0)	35.6 (96.1)	37.2 (99.0)	41.7 (107.1)	42.2 (108.0)	41.1 (106.0)	38.3 (100.9)	33.9 (93.0)	24.4 (75.9)	20.0 (68.0)	42.2 (108.0)
Mean daily maximum °C (°F)	−2.9 (26.8)	−0.6 (30.9)	5.9 (42.6)	13.5 (56.3)	19.2 (66.6)	23.1 (73.6)	27.7 (81.9)	27.2 (81.0)	21.3 (70.3)	13.2 (55.8)	4.6 (40.3)	−1.4 (29.5)	12.6 (54.7)
Daily mean °C (°F)	−8.5 (16.7)	−6.4 (20.5)	−0.3 (31.5)	6.6 (43.9)	12.1 (53.8)	16.4 (61.5)	20.1 (68.2)	19.4 (66.9)	13.8 (56.8)	6.6 (43.9)	−1.2 (29.8)	−6.9 (19.6)	6.0 (42.8)
Mean daily minimum °C (°F)	−14.1 (6.6)	−12.2 (10.0)	−6.6 (20.1)	−0.5 (31.1)	5.1 (41.2)	9.7 (49.5)	12.4 (54.3)	11.5 (52.7)	6.3 (43.3)	−0.2 (31.6)	−7.0 (19.4)	−12.4 (9.7)	−0.7 (30.7)
Record low °C (°F)	−46.1 (−51.0)	−46.1 (−51.0)	−38.9 (−38.0)	−26.7 (−16.1)	−11.1 (12.0)	−1.1 (30.0)	1.2 (34.2)	−0.6 (30.9)	−12.8 (9.0)	−28.7 (−19.7)	−37.8 (−36.0)	−45.6 (−50.1)	−46.1 (−51.0)
Record low wind chill	−54.2	−50.7	−44.7	−31	−12.6	−2.9	0.0	0.0	−12.8	−37.6	−49.2	−58.9	−58.9
Average precipitation mm (inches)	13.8 (0.54)	10.3 (0.41)	15.9 (0.63)	23.3 (0.92)	44.9 (1.77)	75.7 (2.98)	35.2 (1.39)	34.3 (1.35)	31.1 (1.22)	20.1 (0.79)	14.0 (0.55)	12.2 (0.48)	330.9 (13.03)
Average rainfall mm (inches)	0.7 (0.03)	0.5 (0.02)	4.4 (0.17)	16.1 (0.63)	33.2 (1.31)	82.7 (3.26)	32.6 (1.28)	34.6 (1.36)	31.3 (1.23)	15.0 (0.59)	2.8 (0.11)	0.7 (0.03)	254.4 (10.02)
Average snowfall cm (inches)	16.5 (6.5)	10.1 (4.0)	14.8 (5.8)	5.3 (2.1)	6.3 (2.5)	0.0 (0.0)	0.0 (0.0)	0.7 (0.3)	1.4 (0.6)	5.2 (2.0)	12.5 (4.9)	12.3 (4.8)	85.2 (33.5)
Average precipitation days (≥ 0.2 mm)	8.8	7.8	8.7	8.1	10.9	12.9	8.6	8.0	7.4	7.1	7.1	9.0	104.3
Average rainy days (≥ 0.2 mm)	0.75	0.53	1.8	6.1	9.5	11.7	7.7	6.9	7.2	4.8	1.9	0.8	59.7
Average snowy days (≥ 0.2 cm)	8.2	6.4	7.4	2.4	1.6	0.0	0.0	0.06	0.29	2.0	6.1	6.6	41.0
Average relative humidity (%) (at 1500)	6.1	60.5	49.8	37.6	38	41.9	34.8	33.4	37.6	44.3	57.4	65.4	47.2
Mean monthly sunshine hours	110.0	138.1	174.2	240.3	282.8	303.4	353.5	323.9	221.4	181.5	114.6	98.6	2,544.3
Percentage possible sunshine	41.2	48.6	47.4	58.3	59.3	62.5	71.7	72.3	58.3	54.3	42.0	38.9	54.6
Source: Environment and Climate Change Canada. Data is from Medicine Hat AWOS, Medicine Hat, Medicine Hat A, Medicine Hat RCS

== Demographics ==
Federal census population history
Year	Pop.	±%
1901	1,570	—
1906	3,050	+94.3%
1911	5,608	+83.9%
1916	9,272	+65.3%
1921	9,634	+3.9%
1926	9,536	−1.0%
1931	10,300	+8.0%
1936	9,592	−6.9%
1941	10,571	+10.2%
1946	12,859	+21.6%
1951	16,364	+27.3%
1956	20,826	+27.3%
1961	24,484	+17.6%
1966	25,574	+4.5%
1971	26,518	+3.7%
1976	32,811	+23.7%
1981	40,380	+23.1%
1986	41,804	+3.5%
1991	43,625	+4.4%
1996	46,783	+7.2%
2001	51,249	+9.5%
2006	56,997	+11.2%
2011	60,005	+5.3%
2016	63,260	+5.4%
2021	63,271	+0.0%
Source: Statistics Canada

In the 2021 Census of Population conducted by Statistics Canada, the City of Medicine Hat had a population of 63,271 living in 27,216 of its 28,732 total private dwellings, virtually unchanged from its 2016 population of 63,260. With a land area of 111.97 square kilometres (43.23 sq mi), it had a population density of 565.1/km^{2} (1,463.5/sq mi) in 2021.

In the 2016 Census of Population conducted by Statistics Canada, the City of Medicine Hat had a population of 63,260 living in 26,652 of its 27,970 total private dwellings, a change of 5.4% from its 2011 population of 60,005. With a land area of 112.04 km^{2} (43.26 sq mi), it had a population density of 564.6/km^{2} (1,462.4/sq mi) in 2016.

The population of the City of Medicine Hat according to its 2015 municipal census is 63,018, a change of 3% from its 2012 municipal census population of 61,180.

=== Ethnicity ===
In 2021, 85.9% of residents were white/European, 9.0% were visible minorities and 5.1% were Indigenous. The largest visible minority groups were South Asian (1.9%), Filipino (1.8%), Black (1.5%), and Chinese (1.0%).

Panethnic groups in the City of Medicine Hat (2001−2021)
Panethnic group	2021		2016		2011		2006		2001	
Panethnic group	Pop.	%	Pop.	%	Pop.	%	Pop.	%	Pop.	%
European (Note: Statistic includes all persons that did not make up part of a visible minority or an indigenous identity.)	53,025	85.76%	54,375	88.11%	52,940	90.28%	51,995	92.93%	47,685	94.16%
Indigenous	3,225	5.22%	3,120	5.06%	2,830	4.83%	2,130	3.81%	1,065	2.1%
Southeast Asian (Note: Statistic includes total responses of "Filipino" and "Southeast Asian" under visible minority section on census.)	1,535	2.48%	945	1.53%	500	0.85%	150	0.27%	200	0.39%
South Asian	1,190	1.92%	630	1.02%	430	0.73%	265	0.47%	150	0.3%
African	955	1.54%	840	1.36%	705	1.2%	180	0.32%	195	0.39%
East Asian (Note: Statistic includes total responses of "Chinese", "Korean", and "Japanese" under visible minority section on census.)	845	1.37%	690	1.12%	560	0.95%	575	1.03%	590	1.17%
Latin American	490	0.79%	635	1.03%	415	0.71%	540	0.97%	655	1.29%
Middle Eastern (Note: Statistic includes total responses of "West Asian" and "Arab" under visible minority section on census.)	330	0.53%	255	0.41%	135	0.23%	40	0.07%	70	0.14%
Other/multiracial (Note: Statistic includes total responses of "Visible minority, n.i.e." and "Multiple visible minorities" under visible minority section on census.)	240	0.39%	235	0.38%	100	0.17%	65	0.12%	35	0.07%
Total responses	61,830	97.72%	61,715	97.56%	58,640	97.73%	55,950	98.16%	50,640	98.81%
Total population	63,271	100%	63,260	100%	60,005	100%	56,997	100%	51,249	100%
Note: Totals greater than 100% due to multiple origin responses

=== Language ===
89.6% of residents identified English as their first language as of the 2021 census. Other common mother tongues were German (1.3%), Tagalog (1.0%), French (0.9%), Spanish (0.9%), Arabic (0.6%), and Chinese languages (0.5%).

=== Religion ===
52.8% of residents identified as Christian at the time of the 2021 census, down from 68.1% in 2011. 20.7% were Catholic, 16.6% were Protestant, 9.0% were Christian n.o.s.. Other Christian denominations and Christian-related traditions accounted for 6.5% of the population, including Latter Day Saints followers at 1.6%. Non-religious and secular residents accounted for 43.1% of the population, up from 30.2% in 2011. 4.1% of residents belonged to other religions, up from 1.7% in 2011. The largest non-Christian religions were Islam (1.5%), Sikhism (0.5%) and Hinduism (0.5%).

== Economy ==
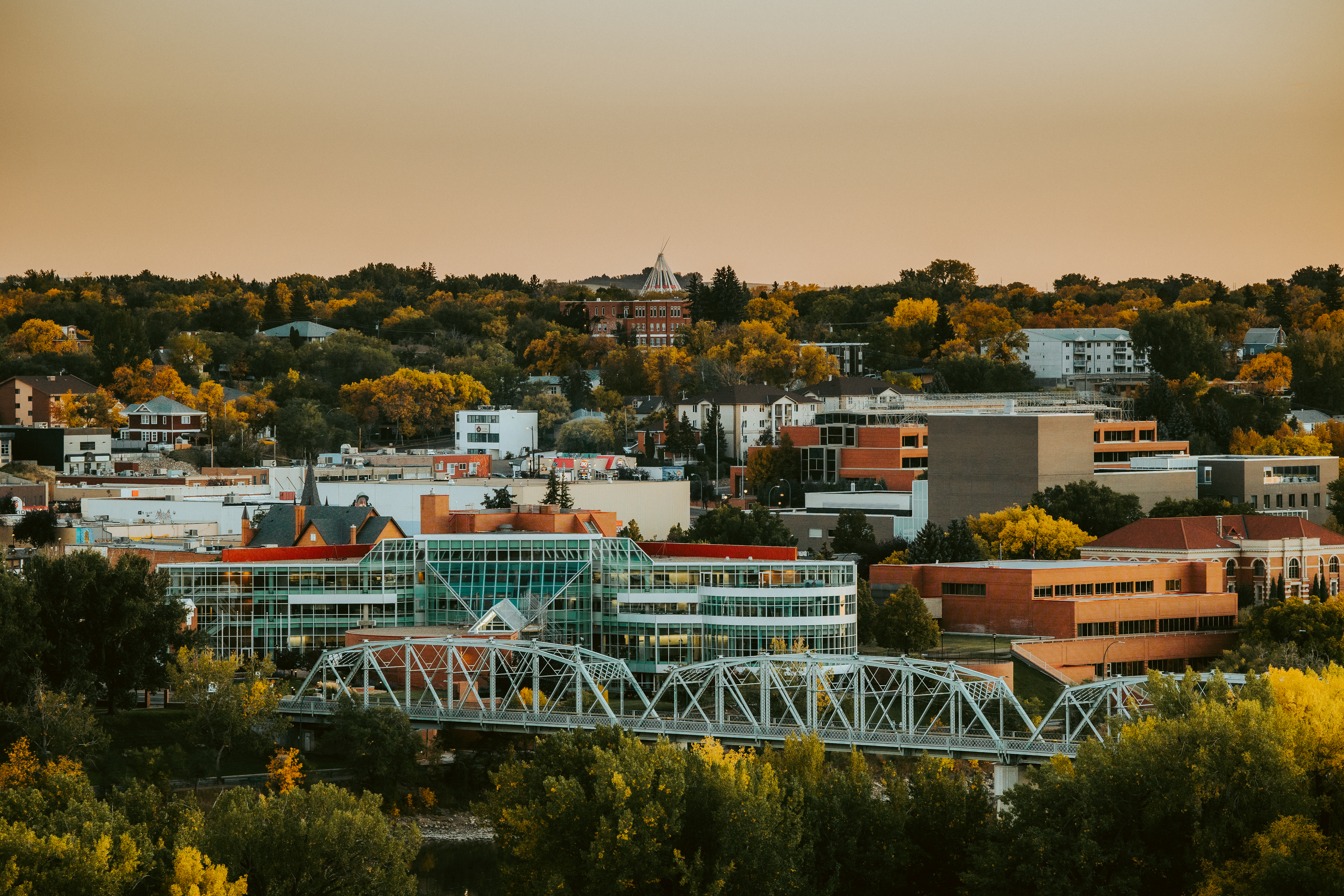
Downtown Medicine Hat

Medicine Hat's economy is characterized by diversification and resilience, though it still reflects its historical roots in natural resources. The city's early reliance on natural gas and clay shaped its economic development, the decline of the natural gas sector has pushed Medicine Hat to adapt and evolve in recent decades.

In the past, natural gas was the backbone of Medicine Hat's economy, earning the city the nickname "The Gas City". However, the fluctuating prices of natural gas, particularly in the 2000s, forced the city to pivot. In 2019, Medicine Hat announced plans to close roughly 2,000 of its natural gas wells, signaling a clear shift away from fossil fuel dependence. This transition has been part of a broader effort to move toward more sustainable and diverse economic drivers.

While the gas industry may have declined, manufacturing continues to be a crucial sector. The city is home to significant industrial operations, including a large Goodyear tire and rubberplant, a Methanex methanol production facility, and other manufacturing businesses. This sector plays a key role in providing employment and maintaining economic stability, with industries ranging from automotive to chemicals and construction materials.

One of the most notable developments in recent years has been Medicine Hat's growing role in the tech and energy sectors. With its abundant energy resources, including renewable energy projects, Medicine Hat is positioning itself as a center for innovative energy solutions, including cryptocurrency mining; the city is home to Canada's largest Bitcoin mine.

Agriculture remains a significant component of Medicine Hat's economy. The city is home to Big Marble Farms, Alberta's largest greenhouse operation. The region's fertile soil supports a robust agricultural base, with diverse activities including crop production, livestock farming, and agribusiness ventures. Additionally, Medicine Hat benefits from its close proximity to the broader agricultural heartland of southern Alberta, further strengthening its agricultural ties.

Medicine Hat is located near the Suffield military base, Canada's largest military training area. This proximity provides economic benefits through defense contracts, research, and employment related to military operations.

While not the dominant driver of the economy, tourism is increasingly important. Medicine Hat's historical landmarks, parks, and events attract visitors, while the city's retail sector continues to grow, supported by both local demand and its role as a regional service center.

Medicine Hat's economy today is far more diversified than it was in the past. While manufacturing and agriculture remain pillars, the city has embraced technological innovation and continues to seek opportunities in emerging industries. The shift away from a sole dependence on natural gas has been a defining feature of its modern economic landscape, setting the stage for a more sustainable and adaptive future.

== Arts and culture ==
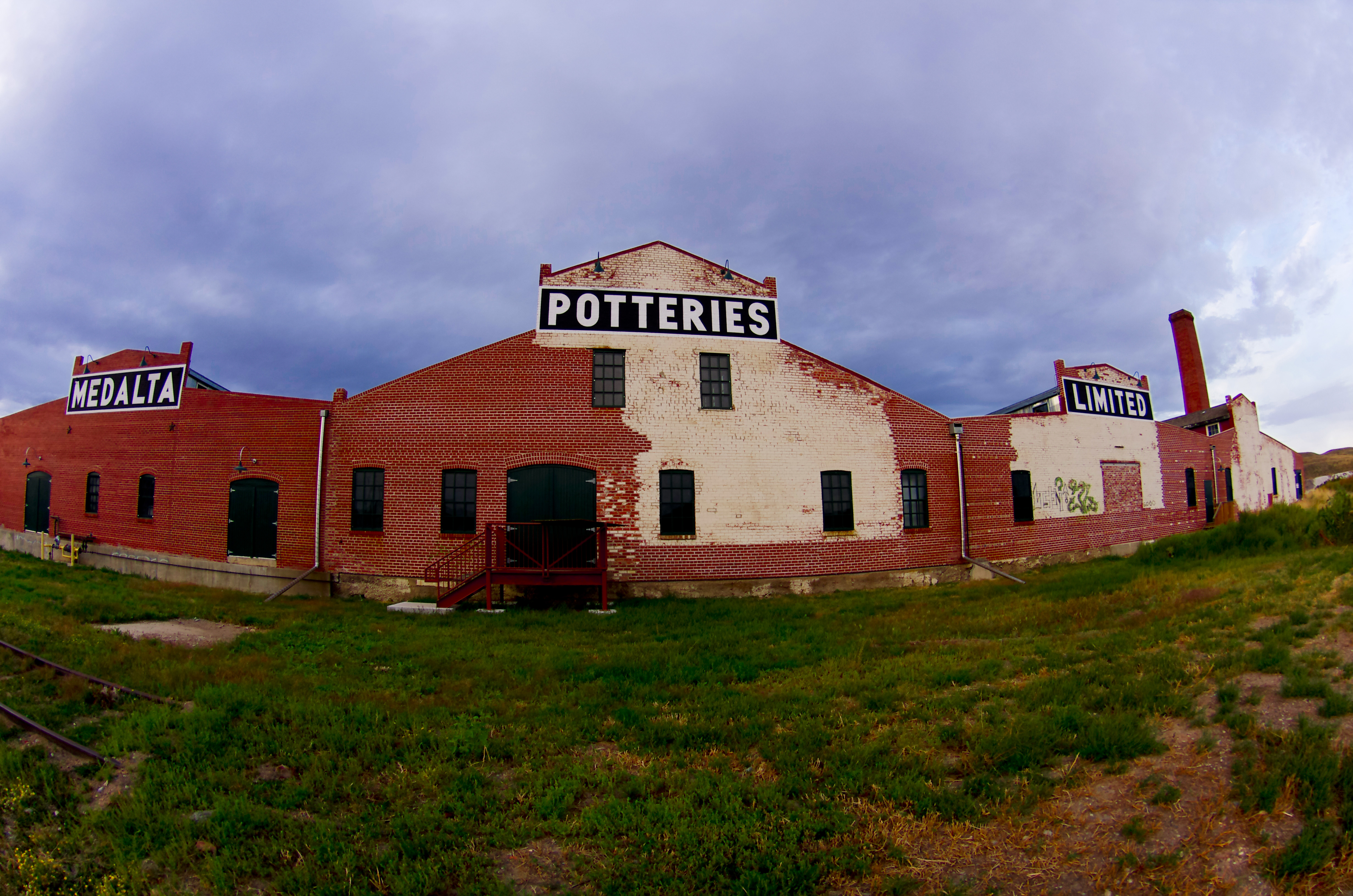
Medalta Potteries

The Medicine Hat Clay Industries National Historic District is a living, working museum based on the Medalta Potteries and Hycroft China Factory Complexes as the focal points of the 61 hectares (150 acres) district. It offers guided tours, educational and arts programming, as well as experience through collections, exhibits, and interpretation. This nationally recognized industrial historic district is a cultural initiative of the Friends of Medalta Society with federal, provincial, municipal and private support. They are working to restore, preserve and culturally develop the Medicine Hat Clay Industries National Historic District for education and public enjoyment.

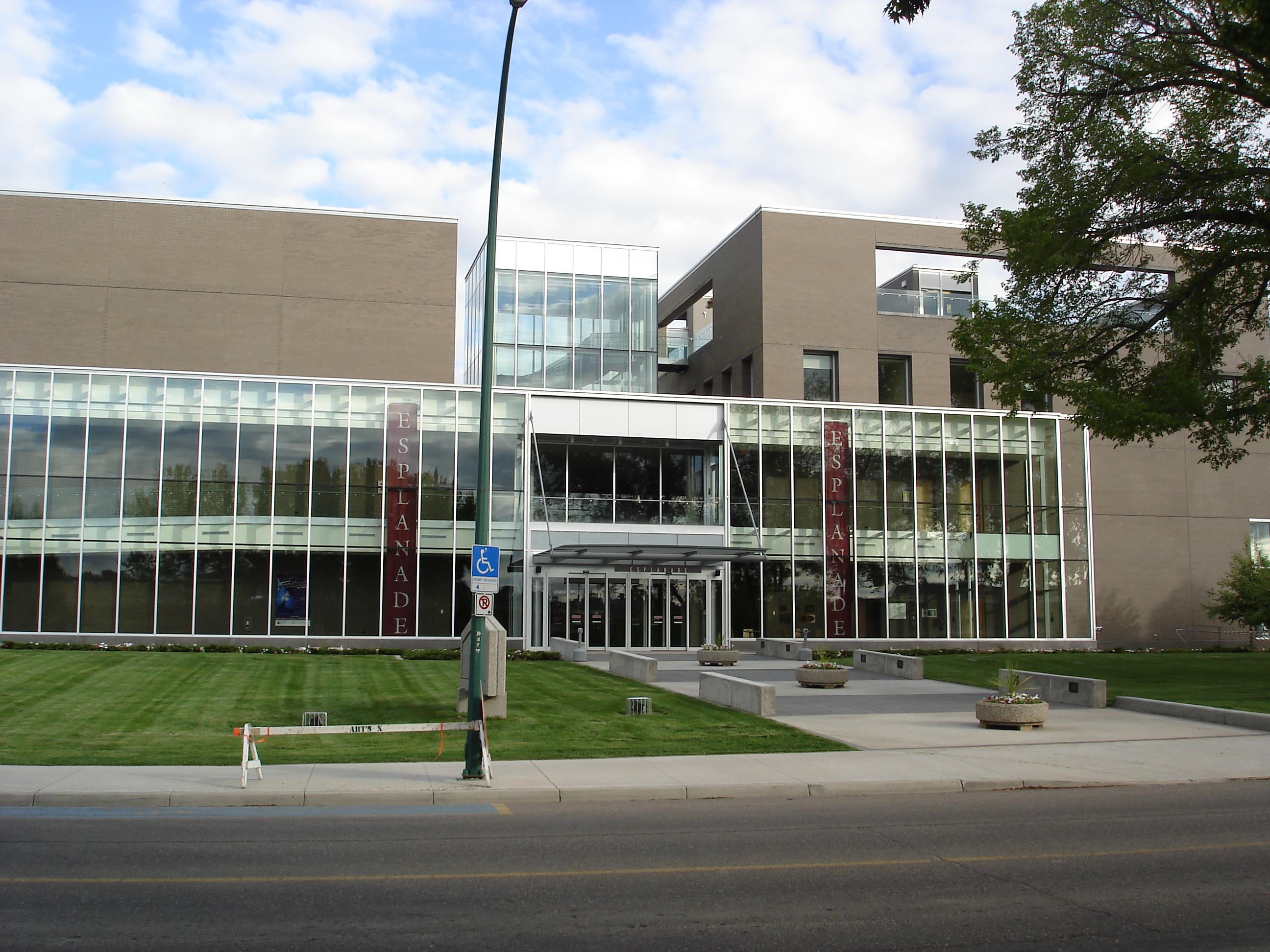
Esplande Arts & Heritage Centre

Located in downtown Medicine Hat, The Esplanade is a large multi-purpose cultural centre. The facility features a 700+ seat performing arts theatre, art gallery, museum, archives, gift shop, and cafe. The Esplanade officially opened in October 2005.

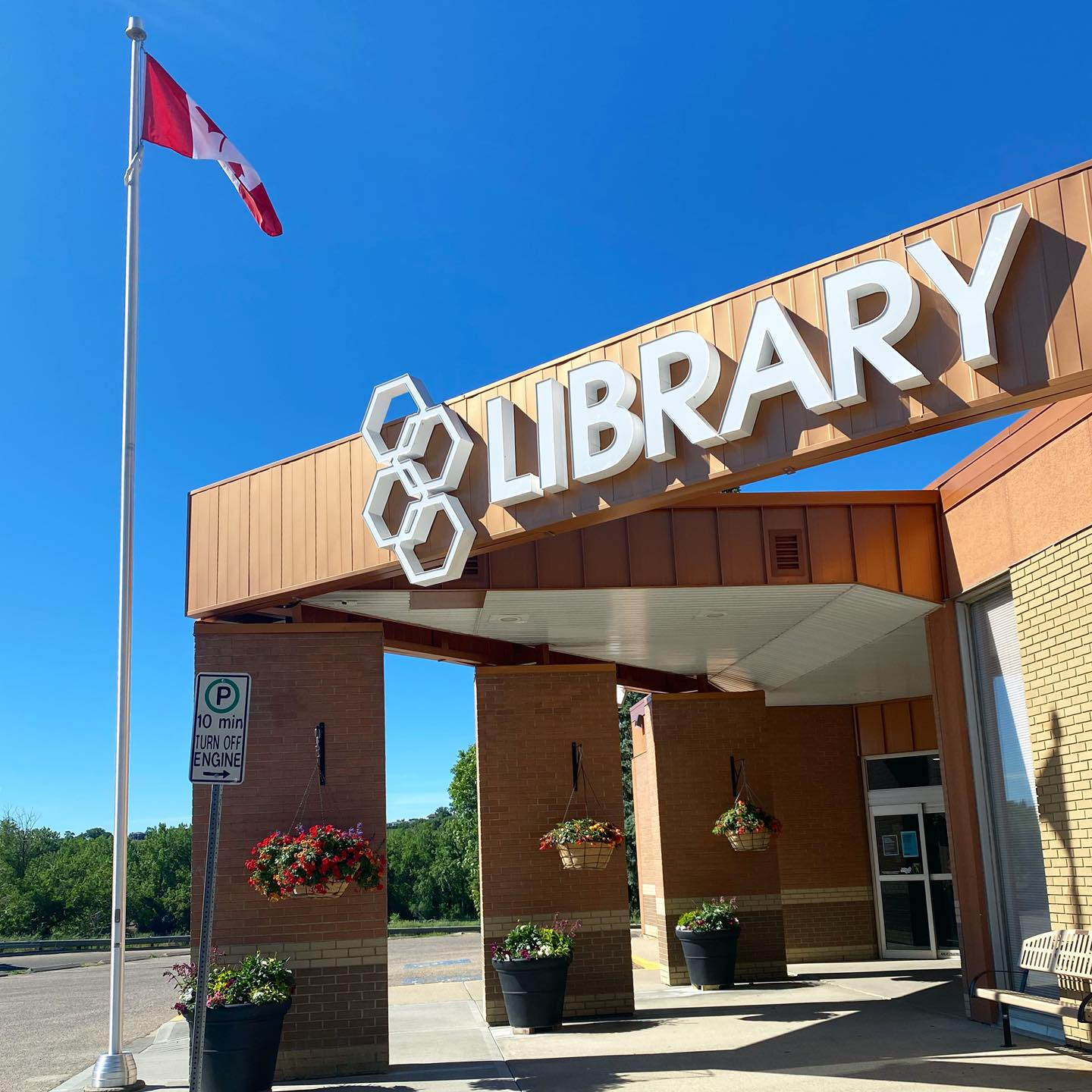
Medicine Hat Public Library

Medicine Hat Public Library is located across the street from The Esplanade. It has over 10,000 annual members and is the resource library for the Shortgrass Library System of Southern Alberta.

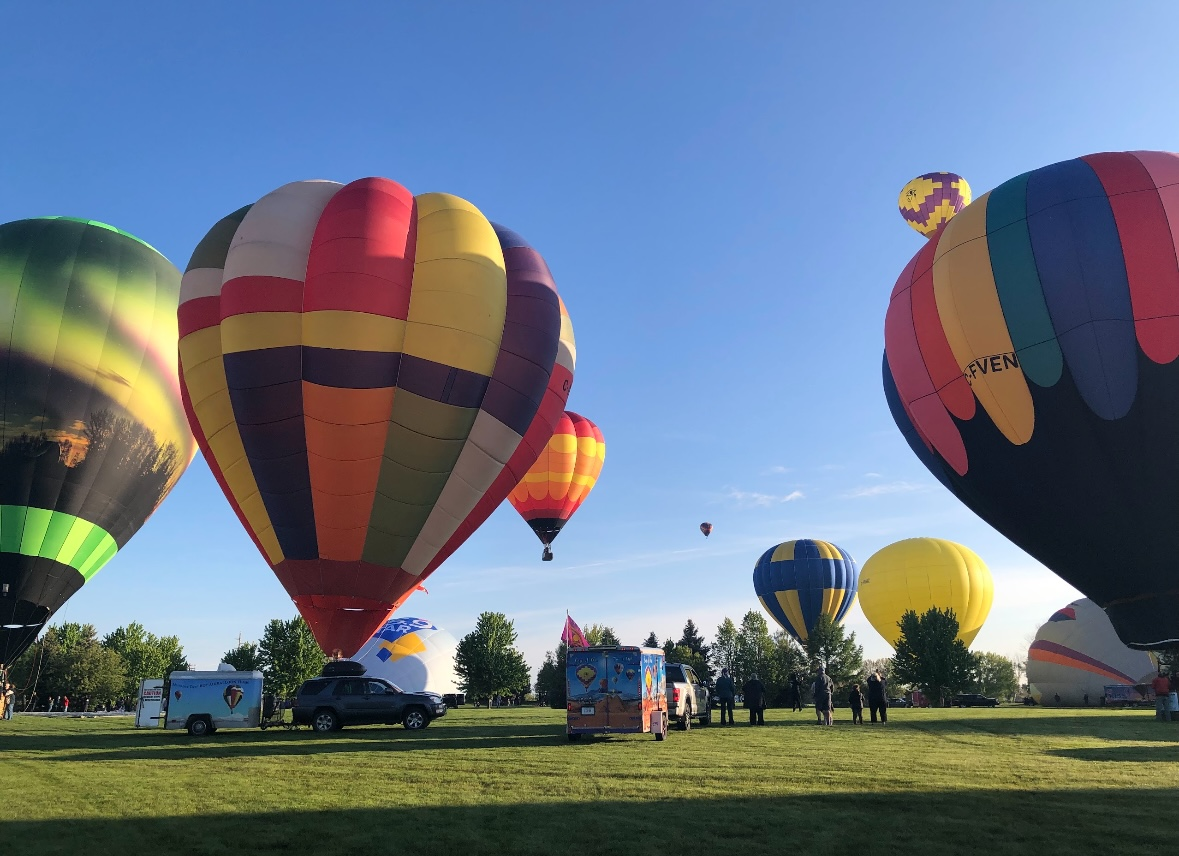
Rise Up Hot Air Balloon Festival

Medicine Hat hosts a number of annual festivals and events throughout the year including Tongue On The Post Folk Music Festival, Rise Up Hot Air Balloon Festival, Spectrum Festival, Jazz Fest, Porch Fest, The Hills Are Alive Music & Culture Fest, Beat The Heat and many more. The best-known event in Medicine Hat is the Medicine Hat Exhibition & Stampede, a rodeo and fair held annually at the end of July. It is one of the largest and oldest rodeo and exhibition events in Canada. The Stampede has a rich history dating back to the early 20th century and has become an integral part of Medicine Hat's cultural identity.

== Attractions ==
The Medicine Hat Family Leisure Centre (now called Big Marble Go Centre) is the largest indoor multi-purpose sports facility in the city. The building is 8,400 m^{2} (90,000 sq ft) and is sited on 23 ha (57 acres) in the north end of the city. The facility includes an Olympic-sized ice rink, 50 m (160 ft) pool, waterslide, diving platforms, kiddies pool, wave pool, and cafe. It is being renovated to include an indoor soccer facility, track, and improved fitness centre. These will almost double the size of the facility. In the area surrounding the Leisure Centre facility are several other sportvenues including; four ball diamonds, lighted football field, three soccer pitches, and one of the largest BMX racing facilities in Southern Alberta.

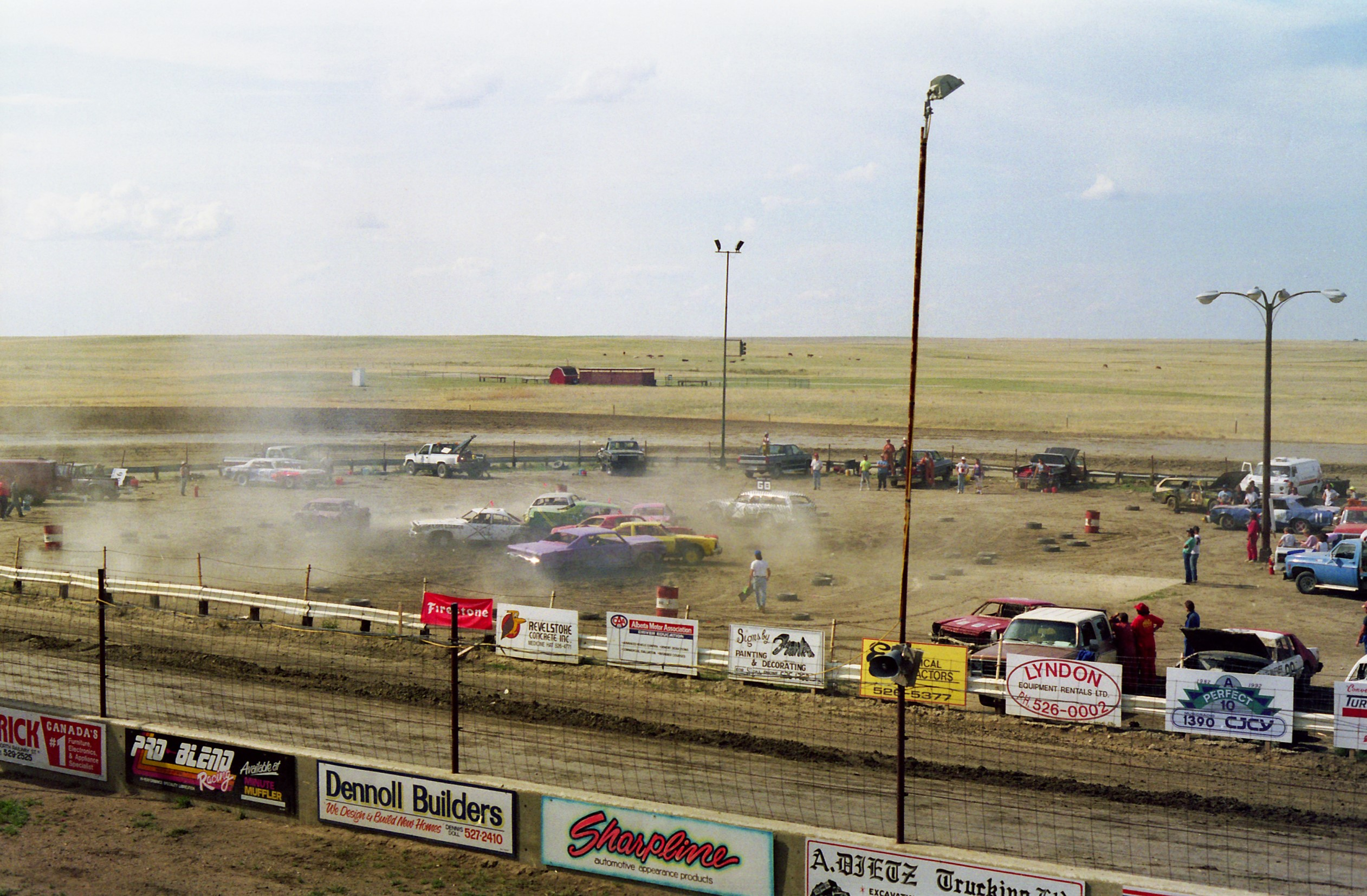
Medicine Hat Speedway

The Medicine Hat Drag Racing Association is located just off the Trans-Canada Highway on Boundary Road or the spectators entrance on Box Springs Road. This is Alberta's only sanctioned National Hot Rod Association (NHRA) track and is a 1/4 mile in length. The facility supports affordable family entertainment and encourages people to race the strip, not the street. The seasons typically run from May till September, with events featuring jet and alcohol cars, bracket racing, and the NHRA National open, which attracts approximately 300 cars from all over North America.

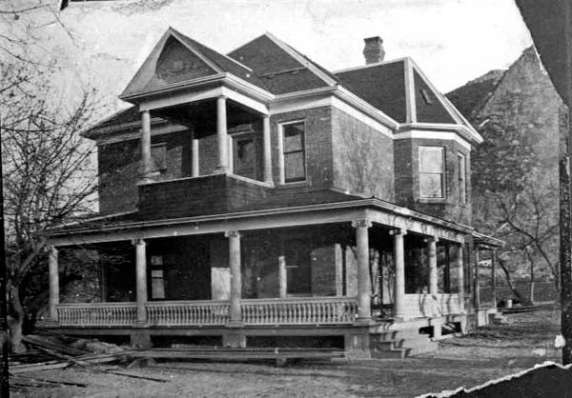
The Shannon House

The Shannon House is a historical landmark built in 1906 by James Shannon for his wife and nine children. He had purchased the land and a team of horses for $40.00 in 1895. The family kept the property for three generations, using part of it as a campground in the early 20th century. In 1930, they built the Maple Leaf motel on the property to generate some income. In 1990 a local family bought the property. With a view toward keeping the prominent property as part of the community, they adapted it as the Saamis Memorial Funeral Chapel & Crematorium.

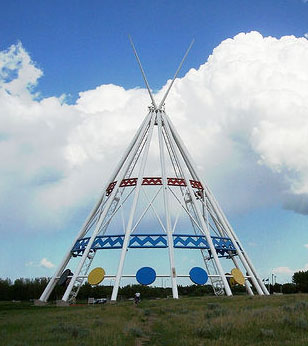
Saamis Tepee, installed 1991

Now named the Saamis Tepee, this work of public art is the world's tallest teepee. It was installed in 1991 south of the Trans-Canada Highway and at the edge of the Blackfoot buffalo jump, above the Saamis Archeological Site along Seven Persons Creek. Commissioned for the 1988 Winter Olympics in Calgary as a symbol of Canada's Plains Indians, it stood 66 m (215 ft) high (more than 20 storeys) and is 160 ft (49 m) in diameter at the base. The sculpture was designed by Steve Illes of steel and concrete. He had the teepee painted "white for purity, red for the rising and setting sun, and blue for flowing waters". Within the teepee are ten circles, with painted illustrations that express ideas about the cultures of the Plains tribes. Explanation are on plaques set in the base. Although designed to withstand extreme temperatures and winds up to 240 km/h (150 mph), during a severe windstorm in January 2007, a portion of the teepee was damaged. Inspection revealed that extensive weathering had weakened the structure. The necessary repairs resulted in lowering the height of Saamis Teepee by approximately 4.6 m (15 ft).

=== Parks ===
There are over 100 km (62 mi) of walking trails in the city. All of the major parks are linked by the extensive trail system.

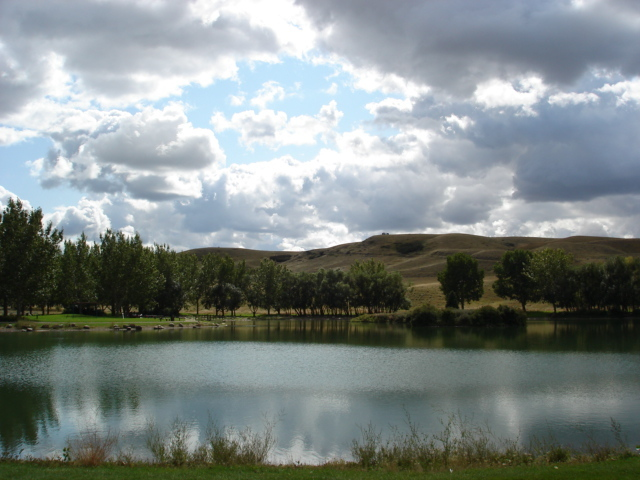
View of the pond at Echodale Regional Park

- Police Point Park was an early North-West Mounted Police outpost. It has 120 ha (300 acres) and shale paths next to the South Saskatchewan River. It is one of Southern Alberta's well-known birding destinations. The Medicine Hat Interpretive Program building is located on-site, to run programs and inform the public about nature around the city.
- Strathcona Island Park is located along the south bank of the South Saskatchewan River. The park has 5 km (3.1 mi) of walking trails, playgrounds, a water park, ball diamonds, a pavilion centre, washrooms, ice skating, kitchens and fire pits. The park is heavily treed.
- Kin Coulee Park is located along the banks of Seven Persons Creek. This 40 ha (100 acres) park is almost entirely manicured. The park features a skateboard park, two ball diamonds, beach volleyball courts, fire pits, a band shell, washrooms, and two playgrounds. It is the venue for the annual Canada Day festival and fireworks.
- Echodale Regional Park is a 650 km^{2} (250 sq mi) park that includes a manmade swimming lake. Amenities include a beach, walking trails, fire pits, canoe rentals, paddle boats, snack bar, washrooms and historic ranch.
- Central Park – located in the Southeast Hill neighbourhood, this is surrounded by large cottonwood trees and, on the north side, a row of cedar trees. It has play structures and a spray-deck, and a street basketball court.
- Riverside Veterans' Memorial Park – located downtown across River Road from the South Saskatchewan River and across 6th Avenue from City Hall. It contains the city's Cenotaph, a WWII-era Sherman tank, a brick mural by James Marshall, and two Canadian Pacific Railway locomotives.
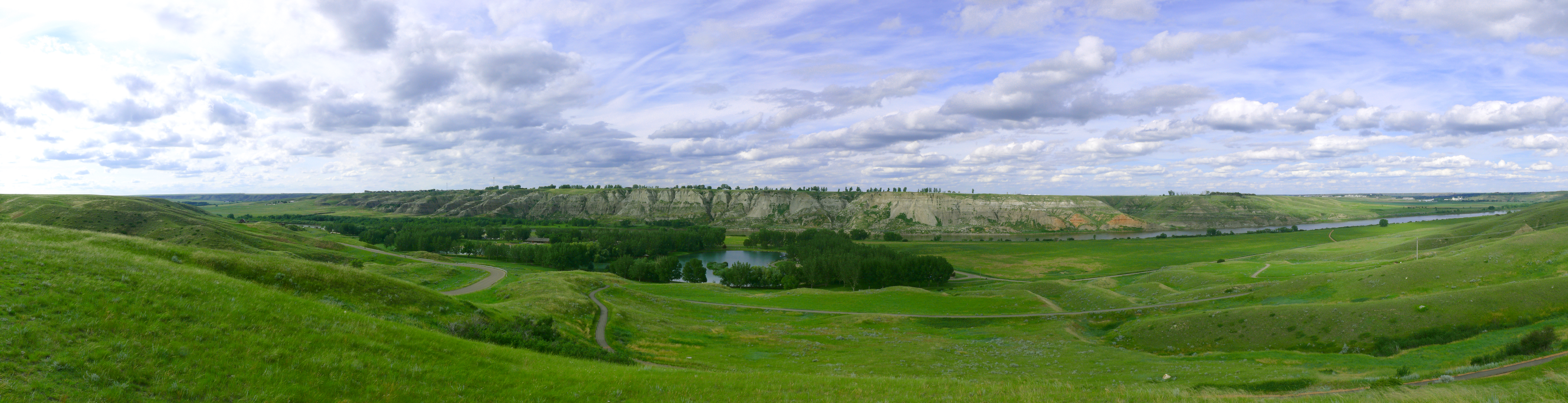
Echodale Regional Park

== Sports ==
The city is home to the Medicine Hat Tigers, a major junior ice hockey team in the Western Hockey League (WHL). Established in 1970, the team has won seven division titles, six WHL league championships and back-to-back Canadian Hockey League (CHL) Memorial Cup national championships in 1987 and 1988 in its history. Numerous Tigers alumni moved on to play in the National Hockey League (NHL). Lanny McDonald played WHL hockey for the Medicine Hat Tigers. He played in 1971–1972 and scored 50 goals and assisted on 64 goals. In 1972–1973 seasons he scored 62 goals and 77 assists. They play at Co-op Place which opened in 2015 and replaced the 40-year-old Medicine Hat Arena.

The city is also home to the Medicine Hat Mavericks, a summer collegiate baseball team in the Western Canadian Baseball League (WCBL). Established in 2003, the team plays at Athletic Park stadium, formerly home to the Medicine Hat Blue Jays, in the River Flats neighbourhood adjacent to downtown.

== Government ==
In 2012 the riding of Medicine Hat was renamed to Medicine Hat—Cardston—Warner. Jim Hillyer of the Conservative Party of Canada (CPC) was elected in the 2015 election. Hillyer died in 2016 and in a special by-election, held on October 24, 2016, Glen Motz (CPC) was elected.

LaVar Payne (CPC) was the Member of Parliament for Medicine Hat since October 2008, and was re-elected in the 2011 election. He announced in 2014 that he would not be running in the next election in October 2015. Previous to Payne the MP was Monte Solberg (CPC).

Medicine Hat has two provincial ridings. One is named Cypress-Medicine Hat, and is represented by Justin Wright of the United Conservative Party (UCP), while the other one is named Brooks-Medicine Hat, and is represented by Danielle Smith of the United Conservative Party.

=== Medicine Hat Police Service ===
Medicine Hat
- Motto: Serving and Protecting With Pride

Jurisdictional structure
- Legal jurisdiction: Municipal

Operational structure
- Sworn members: 114
- Elected officer responsible: The Honourable Kaycee Madu, Minister of Justice and Solicitor General
- Agency executive: Alan Murphy, chief of police

Website
- mhps.ca

The Medicine Hat Police Service (MHPS) can trace its history back to January 13, 1899. Among concern by the town council that the five North-West Mounted Police could no longer safely protect the town and the district, council passed By-Law 8, which authorized a town constable position to be created; at this time the officer was also in charge of health enforcement and other duties. As of 2017 the MHPS employs around 100 officers. In October 2016 Medicine Hat Police Service opened a police museum, the third of its kind in Alberta.

The MHPS was the first police force in Canada to receive a Police Service Banner and first in Alberta to be granted a National Municipal Police Service Badge by the Canadian Heraldic Authority.

== Infrastructure ==
Alberta Transportation is currently negotiating with landowners south of the city to secure land for the future Highway 1 (Trans-Canada Highway) bypass.

The city owns the gas production, gas distribution, electric generation and electric distribution utilities that serve the citizens.

The city is working on design of the South-West Sector Sanitary Trunk main, extension of South Boundary Road from Strachan Road to South Ridge Drive, and a South-West Sector water transmission line. This infrastructure will accommodate the development of new residential communities west of South Ridge Dr, and south of the Seven Persons Creek.

The city is served by the Medicine Hat Airport and Medicine Hat Transit.

Acute medical care is provided to residents at Medicine Hat Regional Hospital.

Beginning in 2009, several ICT business leaders began working together to facilitate economic growth and diversify the local economy by building a robust community network based on fibre optic technologies.

== Education ==
Medicine Hat School District No. 76 has been serving the needs of public school students since it came into existence in 1886. The district has five trustees and comprises three secondary schools, Alexandra Middle School (formerly Alexandra Junior High School), Crescent Heights High School and Medicine Hat High School, 12 elementary (K–6) schools, a special education school for the severely disabled, as well as an Alternative School program which incorporates a joint partnership with the YMCA Teen Moms' Program, YMCA Stay-in-School Program, a program with the former Palliser Health Region for secondary students and a program supported by Alberta Children Services for students with behavioural needs. French immersion programming is provided as an option at one elementary school and at Crescent Heights High. The district currently works with the BHTH Institution for Education, part of the International Education Association of Western Canada, to operate an international educational program in China and three schools have joined this program, Tangshan Caofeidian #2 School, Qinhuangdao Foreign Language School, and Shandong Weifang Middle School.

The Medicine Hat Catholic/Separate School District provides educational programming for students from kindergarten through Grade 12. French immersion programming is provided as an option in select District schools. It operates one high school, Monsignor McCoy, and nine other schools.

Medicine Hat also has a Francophone school, École Les Cyprès, and a public/charter school, the Centre for Academic and Personal Excellence (CAPE).

Medicine Hat College is located in the south part of the city. The first students were accepted to the college in 1965. Now with over 2,500 students and three campuses, the college has grown into an integral part of the community. The Medicine Hat College Rattlers athletic program include cross-country running, basketball, volleyball, golf, soccer and futsal.

== Media ==
Medicine Hat has several radio and television stations broadcasting from it, and can receive a few distant AM radio stations from Calgary. Medicine Hat News publishes a daily newspaper.

== Military ==
Medicine Hat is home to the South Alberta Light Horse (SALH), an army reserve unit. The SALH dates back to 1885 when it took part in the suppression of the North-West Rebellion. It gained battle honours in the First and Second World Wars and today its members serve overseas on United Nations and North Atlantic Treaty Organization missions. Members served in Afghanistan.

During the First World War the 175th (Medicine Hat) Battalion, CEF, commanded by Nelson Spencer, was a unit in the Canadian Expeditionary Force.

Medicine Hat was also home to a British Commonwealth Air Training Plan airfield (located at the present airport) and a POW camp (located at the present Exhibition & Stampede grounds) during the Second World War.

Canadian Forces Base Suffield is located 50 km (31 mi) west of the city. It is estimated that the base contributes C$120 million annually to the local economy, principally through its two lodger units: British Army Training Unit Suffield, and Defence Research and Development Canada – Suffield).

== Notable people ==
- Elic Ayomanor, current football player for the Tennessee Titans; recipient of the Jon Cornish Trophy in 2023 as the top Canadian in NCAA football.
- Ronnie Burkett, puppeteer, best known for his original theatrical plays for adults, performed with marionettes.
- David Campbell, Packey J. Dee Professor of American Democracy at the University of Notre Dame
- Terri Clark, country singer
- Amanda (Falk) Cook, singer-songwriter and worship leader and winner of eight GMA Covenant Awards
- Rhoda Cosgrave Sivell, poet
- Glen Edwards, test pilot for the United States Air Force and the namesake of Edwards Air Force Base in southern California.
- Bruno Gerussi, stage and television actor, best known for the lead role in the CBC Television series The Beachcombers.
- Jurgen Gothe, radio broadcaster
- Warren Glowatski, convicted murderer was born in Medicine Hat
- Todd Herman, author and coach
- Corey Hirsch, former NHL goaltender, Stanley Cup champion, Olympic silver medalist, and mental health advocate
- Richard Hortness, Olympic swimmer
- Gordie Johnson, musician, best known as the front man for the reggae rock band Big Sugar, Austin-based Latin jazz band Sit Down Servant and southern rock band Grady.
- Blaine Lacher, former professional ice hockey goaltender, most known playing for the Boston Bruins in the mid-1990s.
- Marilyn Levine, ceramics artist
- Tamara Lich, activist
- Trevor Linden, former professional hockey player, member of the Order of Canada, former president of hockey operations for Vancouver Canucks and recipient of the Order of British Columbia
- Dawson Murschell, darts player
- Bud Olson, former Member of Parliament and Senator for Medicine Hat, former Lieutenant Governor of Alberta
- Chris Osgood, former professional hockey player
- Kalan Porter, singer-songwriter known for winning season 2 of Canadian Idol
- MacKenzie Porter, TV actress known for her roles as Marci in Travelers and as Naomi in Hell on Wheels
- Richard E. Taylor, co-recipient of the 1990 Nobel Prize in Physics
- Arnold Tremere, Executive director of the Canadian International Grains Institute (government official)
- Sage Watson, Olympic track athlete
- Jadyn Wong, actress known for her role as Happy in the American TV series Scorpion

== See also ==
- List of communities in Alberta
- List of place names in Canada of Indigenous origin
- Richardson family murders
