= Flag of Medicine Hat =

Canadian city flag

Medicine Hat
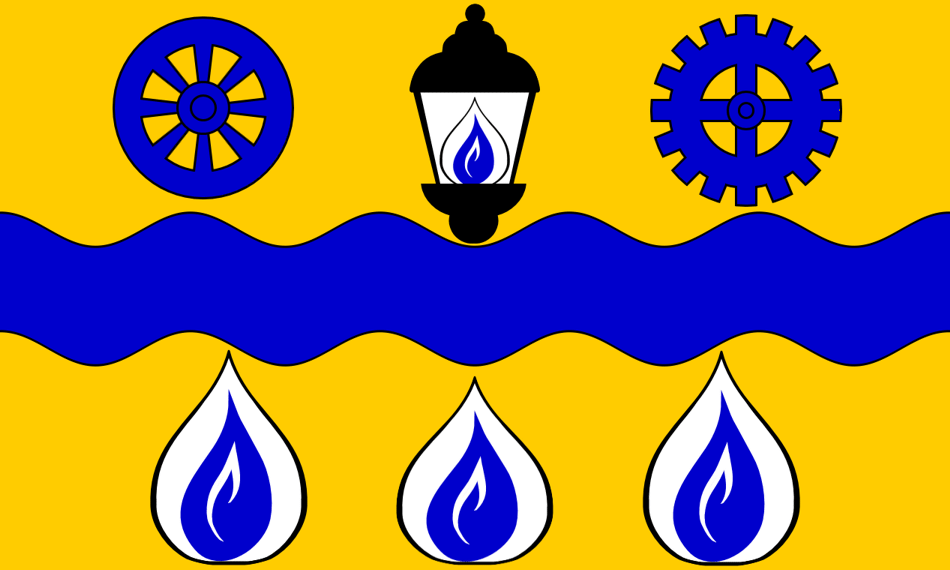
- Proportion: 3:5
- Adopted: July 14, 1998
- Design: A yellow field with a blue twisting stripe with three flames under said stripe and two wheels with a lamp in the middle at the top.
- Designed by: Robert D. Watt

The flag of Medicine Hat is the banner representing the Canadian city of Medicine Hat.

It was designed in 1998 replacing the still frequently used Cree native man and war bonnet blue banner. However, after controversy, the Cree design was re-adopted in 2002 following a non-binding voluntary vote. Today, both flags can be used to represent Medicine Hat. With the official City of Medicine Hat website using the blue banner and the Canadian Heraldic Authority using the redesigned yellow flag.

== History ==
In 1967, Helen Gibson made a proposal for a Medicine civic flag. Pointing out that Edmonton had recently adopted a banner and that it would help advertise the city. However, the city council rejected her idea. Around 30 years later, in the late 1990s, the Medicine Hat Police Service asked, to commemorate its 100th anniversary, a coat of arms from the Canadian Heraldic Society. But, due to a convention, the city would need one first to base the subordinate symbol on. So, the city commissioned its own coat of arms, but received a flag and badge as part of the process. The finishing product is the yellow-blue flag appearing on the city, as well as the police coat of arms. However, Hatters preferred the former flag.

In 2002, the redesign was put on a pole in front of the city plaza and Hatters were asked to take part in a non-binding voluntary vote. They were asked whether to adopt the new flag, or keep them both. 1,300 ballots dropped off at the at city hall, online and at the public library of which 1,004 preferred the old blue banner.

== Symbolism ==
The redesign, which is a banner of arms, is a yellow background featuring a blue twisting stripe in the center symbolizing the South Saskatchewan River as well as flames, and wheels which represents to Medicine Hat's industries: gas, rail and manufacturing.

== Alternative Flag ==
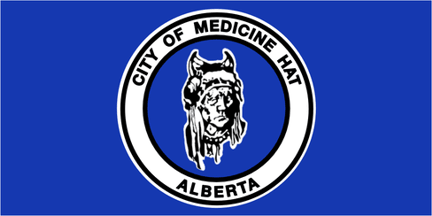
Alternative flag designed by Emily Nott in 1974.

The alternative flag, adopted in 1974, is a deep blue, with a white and blue circle in the middle in which is written: "City of Medicine Hat, Alberta" around a Cree native man coming from the Medicine Hat News logo. Permission was asked to use the copyrighted symbol of course. Despite the new redesign, this flag remains popular among Hatters.
