= Medicine Hat Catholic Separate Regional Division No. 20 =

School district in Alberta, Canada

Location
- 1251 - 1 Avenue SW; Medicine Hat, Alberta, Canada Canada

Other information
- Website: www.mhcbe.ab.ca

Medicine Hat Catholic Separate Regional Division No. 20 or Medicine Hat Catholic Board of Education is a separate school authority within the Canadian province of Alberta operated out of Medicine Hat.

== Schools ==
- École St. John Paul II School (PK-5)
- Holy Trinity Academy (PK-9)
- Monsignor McCoy High School (10-12)
- Mother Teresa School (K-6)
- Notre Dame Academy (6-9)
- St. Francis Xavier School (K-6)
- St. Louis School (K-6)
- St. Mary's School (6-9)
- St. Michael's School (K-6)
- St. Patrick's School (K-5)

== See also ==
- List of school authorities in Alberta
