= Bishop Pinkham Junior High School =

Bishop Pinkham Jr. High School

Location
- 3304 – 63 Avenue S.W. Calgary, Alberta; Canada; 50.997°N 114.128°W

Information
- Type: Public School
- Motto: English: "We will take your hands and help you soar." French: Nous te tendrons la main pour te soutenir et tu t'envoleras
- Established: 1964
- School board: Calgary Board of Education
- Principal: Rishma Hajeed
- Grades: 7, 8, 9 + CSSI
- Enrollment: 478 (2019) (September 2019)
  - Grade 7: 165
  - Grade 8: 165
  - Grade 9: 165
- Campus: Urban
- Communities served: Lakeview, North Glenmore, Discovery Ridge
- School website
- Last updated: Novembre 2019

Bishop Pinkham Junior High School is a public junior high school in Calgary, Alberta, Canada. It has classes for grades 7 through 9, offering French, and English programs. Bishop Pinkham is located in the Lakeview community of Calgary. September 2017 was the last year that French grade 6 was offered at BP. As of September 2017, students leaving the elementary Spanish Bilingual program will enter middle school at AE Cross instead of Bishop Pinkham. At that point, Bishop Pinkham will only offer French and English to grades 7, 8, and 9.

The school is named after Bishop William Cyprian Pinkham who was the first Anglican bishop in Calgary.

== School history ==
The school was founded in 1959 and was named after William Cyprian Pinkham who was a bishop in the city of Calgary. The school was classified as public. It features a late French immersion program, which starts in grade 7, as well as programs for continuing French immersion, and English students. French students take 4 subjects in French (math, social studies, science, and French language arts).
