= North Glenmore Park, Calgary =

North Glenmore Park
- Neighbourhood
- Location of North Glenmore Park in Calgary
- Coordinates: 51°00′14″N 114°06′43″W
- Country: Canada
- Province: Alberta
- City: Calgary
- Quadrant: SW
- Ward: 11
- Established: 1959

Government
  - Mayor: Jeromy Farkas
  - Administrative body: Calgary City Council
  - Councillor: Rob Ward (Communities First)

Area
  - Total: 1.1 km^{2} (0.42 sq mi)
- Elevation: 1,100 m (3,600 ft)

Population (2006)
  - Total: 2,412
  - Average Income: $61,175
- Postal code: T3E
- Website: North Glenmore Park Community Association

North Glenmore Park is a residential neighbourhood in the southwest quadrant of Calgary, Alberta. It is bounded by 50 Avenue SW to the north, Glenmore Athletic Park, Lakeview Golf Course, and Earl Grey Golf Club to the east, Earl Grey Golf Club to the south, and Crowchild Trail SW to the west.

North Glenmore Park was established in 1959 as a subdivision after it was annexed by Calgary the previous year. It is represented in the Calgary City Council by the Ward 11 councillor.

== Demographics ==
In the City of Calgary's 2012 municipal census, North Glenmore Park had a population of 2,386 living in 1,020 dwellings, a -0.1% increase from its 2011 population of 2,388. With a land area of 1.2 km^{2} (0.46 sq mi), it had a population density of 1,990/km^{2} (5,150/sq mi) in 2012.

Residents in this community had a median household income of $61,175 in 2000, and there were 11.2% low income residents living in the neighbourhood. As of 2000, 17.6% of the residents were immigrants. A proportion of 8.3% of the buildings were condominiums or apartments, and 21.4% of the housing was used for renting.

Under an unusual agreement with the neighbouring Lakeview Community Association, North Glenmore Park Community Association may draw the membership of residents of Lakeview living east of 30th Street SW.

== Education ==
The community is served by the Central Memorial/Lord Shaughnessy High School Campus (which houses Juno Beach Academy of Canadian Studies, National Sport Academy and School of Performing and Visual Arts at Central Memorial; a public school), St. James Elementary and Junior High School (Catholic), the Emily Follensbee School for severely disabled students and the Calgary Girls' School charter school.

== See also ==
- List of neighbourhoods in Calgary
