= Ukrainian Bilingual Program =

The Ukrainian Bilingual Program (UBP) is part of some Albertan school board's education. The program was introduced in Edmonton in both the secular and Catholic systems After being founded in Edmonton it then expanded to Vegreville in 1978, Sherwood Park in 1979 and Lamont 1980. Ukrainian as a second language (which is different from a bilingual program) has been taught as a 9-year, 6-year and 3-year program in rural Alberta. There was also a locally developed program from grade 1 in the County of Two Hills.

== History ==
In 1974, in Edmonton, Alberta, the Ukrainian Bilingual Program was created. It was introduced in the Edmonton Public School Board system beginning with a kindergarten class. The 2013–2014 academic school year was the final year for the program to operate in the Edmonton Public School Board district. Edgar Schmidt, superintendent of EPSB cut the program in May 2013 due to declining enrolment in public UBP elementary schools.

The UBP was also introduced into the Edmonton Catholic School District, with its first class starting in 1984. The program in the Edmonton Catholic School Board system celebrated its 40th anniversary in April 2015.

The Lakeland School District offered Ukrainian language education for over 20 years, based in Bonnyville, Alberta.

== Community ==
Students from the UBP have met with students from Aboriginal student groups to share their histories of residential schools and the Holodomor (Ukrainian famine of 1932–33).

== Locations of the Program ==
Although the UBP began in the Edmonton Public School district, it expanded to the Catholic Board about a decade later. The Program also expanded to the area surrounding Edmonton, to the Elk Island Public School District.

The program is currently available in the Edmonton Catholic school system and the Elk Island school system which includes schools in Sherwood Park, and Vegreville. The Elk Island Catholic system also provides the Ukrainian Bilingual Program in Sherwood Park.
