= Pincham =

Pincham is a surname. Notable people with the surname include:

- R. Eugene Pincham (1925–2008), American attorney and judge
- Roger Pincham (born 1935), British politician

== See also ==
- Pinkham (disambiguation)
