= Todd Herman (coach) =

- Born: Medicine Hat, Alberta, Canada
- Education: University of Alberta
- Occupations: Author, performance coach
- Known for: The Alter Ego Effect
- Website: toddherman.me

Todd Herman is a Canadian-born author and performance coach. He is the author of The Alter Ego Effect.

== Early life and education ==
Herman grew up on a farm near Medicine Hat, Alberta, where his parents still run the family farm. He has three siblings and played on sports teams with his older brother, competing with and against players two to three years older than him. He played football for a year at the University of Alberta in Edmonton. During that time, he won OgilvyOne's "World's Greatest Salesperson" and earned a three-month marketing fellowship on Madison Avenue in New York City.

== Career ==
Herman has worked with the New York Yankees staff and the Danish Olympic team to improve performance.

In 2019 Herman published his first book, The Alter Ego Effect. It was reviewed by the Delhi Business Review and appeared the following month on The Wall Street Journal best-seller list. It was also listed on the Missoulian and Qatar Tribune. A year later, in 2020, he published a children's book, My Super Me: Finding the Courage for Tough Stuff. Herman is the founder of 90 Day Year.

== Bibliography ==
- The Alter Ego Effect (2019)
- My Super Me: Finding the Courage for Tough Stuff (2020)
