= Medicine Hat City Council =

Municipal council in Alberta, Canada

Medicine Hat City Council is the governing body for the city of Medicine Hat, Alberta, Canada. The council consists of the mayor and eight councillors.

== Current Medicine Hat City Council ==
- Linnsie Clark, mayor
- Robert Dumanowski, councillor
- Cassi Hider, councillor
- Darren Hirsch, councillor
- Allison Knodel, councillor
- Andy McGrogan, councillor
- Ramona Robins, councillor
- Shila Sharps, councillor
- Alison Van Dyke, councillor
