= Oakridge, Calgary =

Oakridge
- Neighbourhood
- Location of Oakridge in Calgary
- Coordinates: 50°58′04″N 114°07′46″W
- Country: Canada
- Province: Alberta
- City: Calgary
- Quadrant: SW
- Ward: 11
- Established: 1968
- Annexed: 1956

Government
  - Mayor: Jeromy Farkas
  - Administrative body: Calgary City Council
  - Councillor: Rob Ward (Communities First)

Area
  - Total: 2.4 km^{2} (0.93 sq mi)
- Elevation: 1,110 m (3,640 ft)

Population (2006)
  - Total: 6,041
  - Average Income: $72,674
- Website: Oakridge Community Association

Oakridge is a residential neighbourhood in the southwest quadrant of Calgary, Alberta. It is bounded to the north by 90 Avenue S, to the east by 24 Street W and the West/South by Southland Drive. To the north it borders the Glenmore Reservoir and the Weaselhead Natural Area.

Oakridge was under the jurisdiction of the Municipal District of Rocky View until being annexed to the City of Calgary in 1956. It was subsequently established as a neighbourhood in 1968, with home and business construction beginning the following year in 1969. It is represented in the Calgary City Council by the Ward 11 councillor.

== Demographics ==
In the City of Calgary's 2012 municipal census, Oakridge had a population of 5,651 living in 2,291 dwellings, a -1.2% increase from its 2011 population of 5,719. With a land area of 2.4 km^{2} (0.93 sq mi), it had a population density of 2,350/km^{2} (6,100/sq mi) in 2012.

Residents in this community had a median household income of $72,674 in 2000, and there were 6.9% low income residents living in the neighbourhood. As of 2000, 21.3% of the residents were immigrants. A proportion of 1.8% of the buildings were condominiums or apartments, and 8.4% of the housing was used for renting.

== Education ==
The community is served by Louis Riel Elementary & Junior High public school which houses the Science Program and the GATE Program.

== See also ==
- List of neighbourhoods in Calgary
