= Mary Ellen Pinkham =

Mary Ellen Pinkham is a humor columnist and author in the United States. One of her books topped The New York Times Best Seller list for more than a year.

== Bibliography ==
- It Works!: Over 1,000 New Uses for Common Household Items, 2004
- Mary Ellen's Clean House!: the All-In-One-Place Encyclopedia of Contemporary Housekeeping, 1993
- Mary Ellen's Best of Helpful Hints, 1979
- Mary Ellen's One Thousand New Helpful Hints, 1983
- Mary Ellen's Giant Book of Helpful Hints
