= Alberta charter schools =

School system

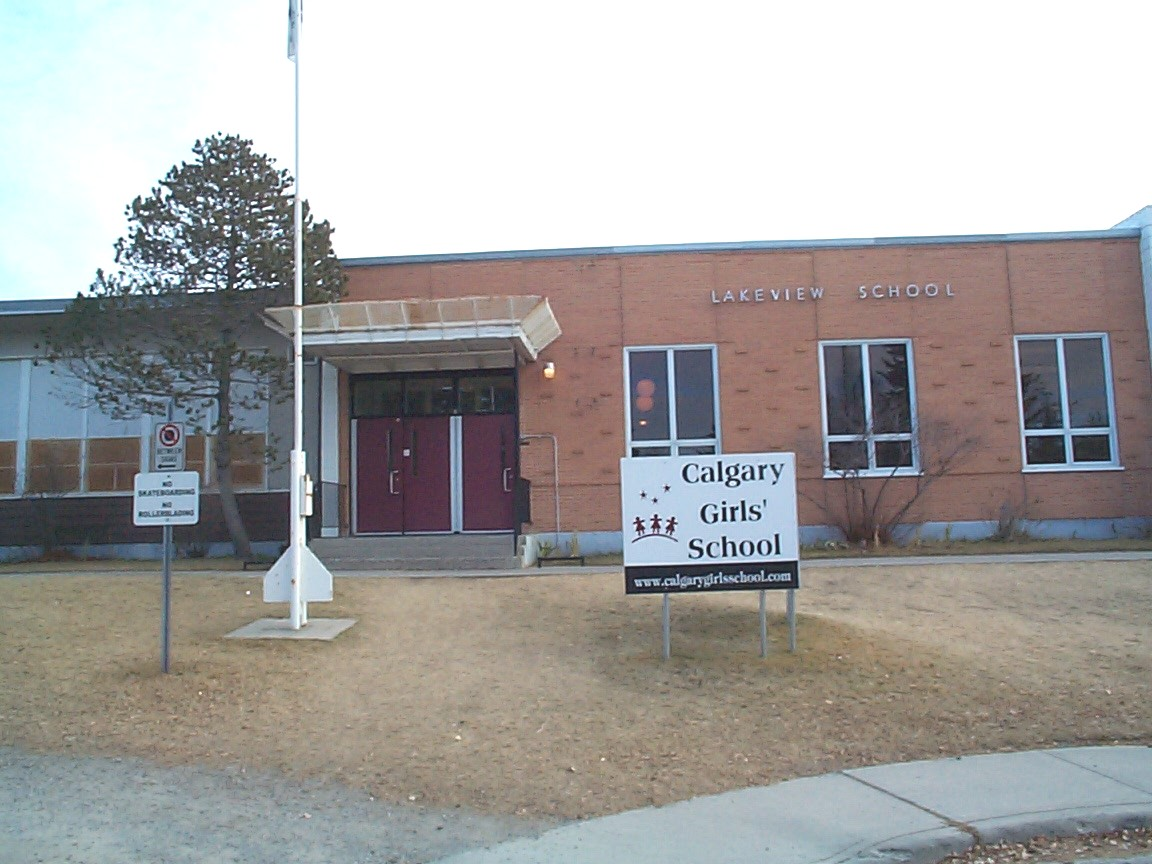
Calgary Girls' School was granted a charter in 2003

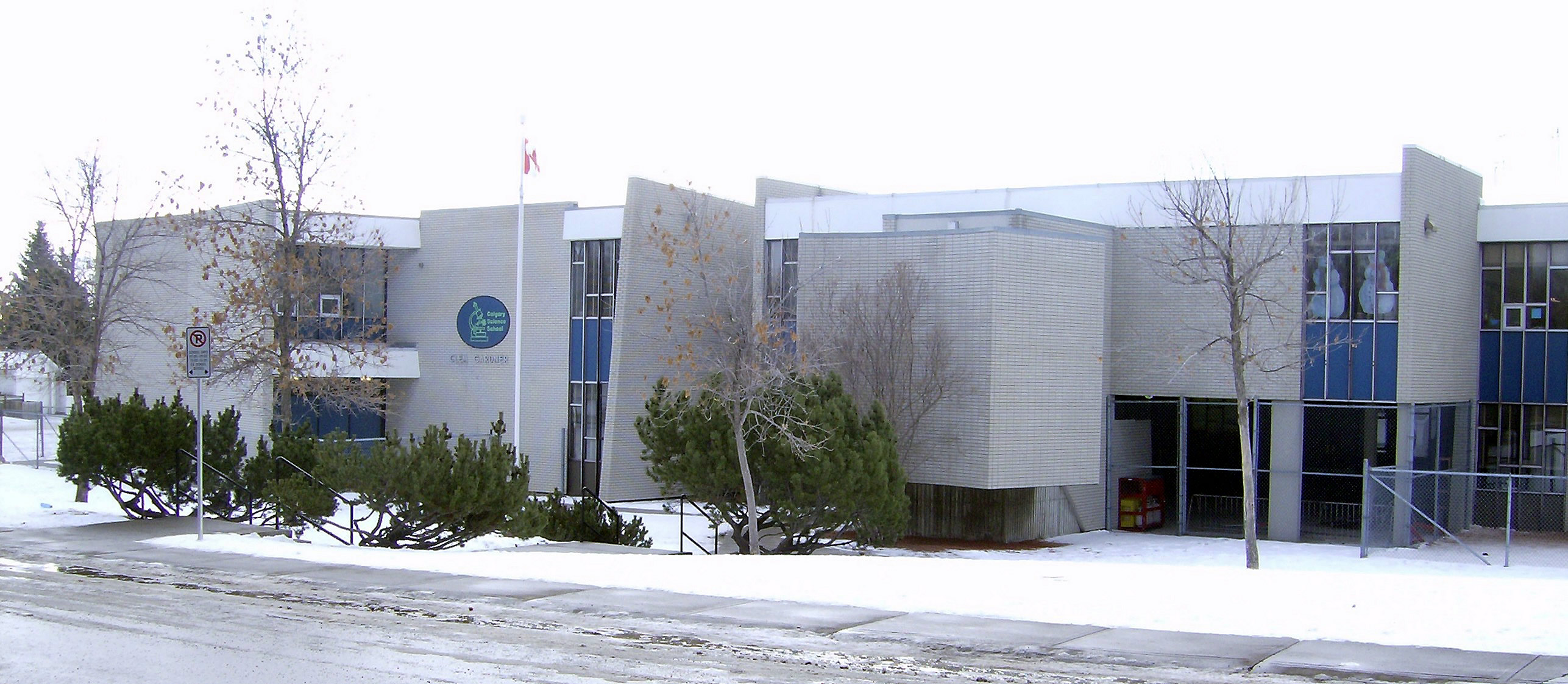
Connect Charter School, a science oriented charter school

Alberta charter schools are a special type of public school which have a greater degree of autonomy than normal public schools, allowing them to offer unique programs that are not available through regular public schools. Charter school boards report directly to the province, bypassing their local school districts.

As of 2022-23, roughly 11,000 students were enrolled in charter schools (1.4% of total student population), compared to 508,478 in public schools (66.3%), 177,633 in separate schools (23.1%), and 40,676 in private schools (5.3%).

Alberta charter schools are publicly-funded institutions that must be incorporated as either non-profit societies or as not-for-profit companies. According to Alberta's Education Act, Charter schools cannot be affiliated with a religious faith or denomination, cannot charge tuition for any Alberta resident students, and cannot operate on a for-profit basis. Teachers must be certificated, but may not necessarily be members of the Alberta Teachers Association union. However, many Charter schools are associate members of the ATA and pay regular union dues (for example: Almadina School Society, Aurora Academic Charter School Limited, Boyle Street Education Centre, and New Horizons Charter School Society) . Moreover, while charters must follow the approved provincial curriculum, they can adopt unique philosophical or pedagogical approaches to their program delivery. Alberta remains the only province in Canada that allows charter schools.

Supporters claim that charter schools offer greater freedom in choice of education for families, allowing them to choose schooling that better reflects their students' interests, aptitudes, or needs, or that more closely aligns with the family's values. They also claim that charter schools improve the public education system through increased accountability, modelling and sharing educational best practices, and by challenging the monopolistic control of local district boards. By contrast, critics have argued that charter schools undermine the public education system by producing separate and segregated educational systems, and by siphoning off students — and the funding that follows them — from regular public schools. Others have argued that charter schools have historically been underfunded relative to other public schools, potentially diminishing the quality of education received by their pupils and establishing a precedent that schools should "do more with less."

Several charter schools are collectively represented by The Association of Alberta Public Charter Schools (TAAPCS).

== Charter schools in Alberta ==
=== Background ===
Alberta first passed legislation allowing charter schools in 1994, three years after the first charter school opened in the United States in Minnesota. Initially, the number of charters was capped at 15 province-wide, and student enrolment numbers were likewise limited. These restrictions were lifted in September 2020.

=== Current charters ===
As of July 2024, there are 37 approved charter schools operated by 22 authorities.

Location	School Authority	Charter/Campus	Chartered	Grades	Notes
Calgary	Alberta Classical Academy Ltd.	Calgary Classical Academy Bridgeland Campus (K-4)	2022	K-11 (with plans to expand to K-12)	Students acquire an academically rigorous and traditional liberal arts education, focusing on classical Western canon art, literature, and philosophy. Offers language instruction in French, Mandarin, and Latin.
Calgary	Alberta Classical Academy Ltd.	Calgary Classical Academy Currie Barracks Campus (K-11)	2023	K-11 (with plans to expand to K-12)	Students acquire an academically rigorous and traditional liberal arts education, focusing on classical Western canon art, literature, and philosophy. Offers language instruction in French, Mandarin, and Latin.
Calgary	Alberta Classical Academy Ltd.	Edmonton Classical Academy Eastgate Campus (K-10)	2023	K-11 (with plans to expand to K-12)	
Calgary	Almadina School Society	Almadina Language Charter Academy, Mountain View Campus (K-4)	1996	K–9	English as a Second Language.
Calgary	Almadina School Society	Almadina Language Charter Academy, Ogden Campus (4-9)	1996	K–9	English as a Second Language.
Calgary	Calgary Arts Academy (CAA)	CAA Knob Hill Elementary Campus (K-3)	2003	K–12	Students learn Alberta Curriculum through Arts Immersion.
Calgary	Calgary Arts Academy (CAA)	CAA Rosscarrock Middle School Campus (4-9)	2003	K–12	Students learn Alberta Curriculum through Arts Immersion.
Calgary	Calgary Arts Academy (CAA)	CAA High School Erickson Centre (10-12)	2020	K–12	Students learn Alberta Curriculum through Arts Immersion.
Calgary	Calgary Girls' Charter School (CGCS)	CGCS Bel-Aire Campus (4-5)	2003	4–9	All-female school with a focus on developing a strong sense of self and understanding historical and contemporary gender issues.
Calgary	Calgary Girls' Charter School (CGCS)	CGCS Lakeview Campus (6-9)	2003	4–9	All-female school with a focus on developing a strong sense of self and understanding historical and contemporary gender issues.
Calgary	Connect Charter School	---	1999	4–9	Formerly called the Calgary Science School. Focus on outdoor education and technology. More instruction time on mathematics, science, and technology, employing a problem-based approach to learning.
Calgary	Foundations for the Future Charter Academy (FFCA)	FFCA High School Campus (9-12)	1997	K–12	Focus on academic excellence, leadership, and character development.
Calgary	Foundations for the Future Charter Academy (FFCA)	FFCA South High School Campus (9-12)	1997	K–12	Focus on academic excellence, leadership, and character development.
Calgary	Foundations for the Future Charter Academy (FFCA)	North Middle School Campus (5-8)	1997	K–12	Focus on academic excellence, leadership, and character development.
Calgary	Foundations for the Future Charter Academy (FFCA)	Northeast Elementary Campus (K-4)	1997	K–12	Focus on academic excellence, leadership, and character development.
Calgary	Foundations for the Future Charter Academy (FFCA)	Northwest Elementary Campus (K-4)	1997	K–12	Focus on academic excellence, leadership, and character development.
Calgary	Foundations for the Future Charter Academy (FFCA)	South Middle School Campus (5-8)	1997	K–12	Focus on academic excellence, leadership, and character development.
Calgary	Foundations for the Future Charter Academy (FFCA)	Southeast Elementary Campus (K-4)	1997	K–12	Focus on academic excellence, leadership, and character development.
Calgary	Foundations for the Future Charter Academy (FFCA)	Southwest Elementary Campus (K-4)	1997	K–12	Focus on academic excellence, leadership, and character development.
Calgary	Fusion Education Association	Fusion Collegiate	**proposed for 2024	10-12	Vocational focus with career pathways in business and entrepreneurship, animal and health sciences, skilled trades, or a combination thereof.
Calgary	STEM Innovation Academy	STEM Innovation Academy Middle School (7-9)	2021	7-12	Focus on STEM education and digital technologies. Sister school to Stem Collegiate (in Edmonton).
Calgary	STEM Innovation Academy	STEM Innovation Academy High School (10-12)	2021	7-12	Focus on STEM education and digital technologies. Sister school to Stem Collegiate (in Edmonton).
Calgary	Westmount Charter School	Westmount Elementary School (K-4)	1996	K–12	Curriculum and charter mandate described as serving gifted students.
Calgary	Westmount Charter School	Westmount Mid-High School (5-12)	1996	K–12	Curriculum and charter mandate described as serving gifted students.
Calmar	New Humble Community School	---	2021	K-6	Offers agricultural and experiential land-management education.
Edmonton	Alberta Classical Academy Ltd.	Edmonton Classical Academy	2023	K-8	Students acquire an academically rigorous and traditional liberal arts education, focusing on classical Western canon art, literature, and philosophy. Offers language instruction in French, Mandarin, and Latin.
Edmonton	Aurora Academic Charter School	AACS Sherbrooke (Primary, K-7)	1996	K–12	Students engage in a structured, knowledge-rich education that emphasises literacy, numeracy, and critical thinking, while fostering courtesy, effort, and personal responsibility. A school uniform supports a focused and respectful learning environment. Offers French language instruction.
Edmonton	Aurora Academic Charter School	AACS Skyrattler (Middle, 5-7)	2025	K–12	Students engage in a structured, knowledge-rich education that emphasises literacy, numeracy, and critical thinking, while fostering courtesy, effort, and personal responsibility. A school uniform supports a focused and respectful learning environment. Offers French language instruction.
Edmonton	Aurora Academic Charter School	AACS Alberta Avenue (Secondary, 8-12)	2023	K–12	Students engage in a structured, knowledge-rich education that emphasises literacy, numeracy, and critical thinking, while fostering courtesy, effort, and personal responsibility. A school uniform supports a focused and respectful learning environment. Offers French language instruction.
Edmonton	Boyle Street Education Centre	---	1995	K–12	Offers trauma-informed, reconciliation-first education, primarily for inner-city Indigenous youth whose formal schooling has been interrupted. Available programming includes art, cooking, fashion, hairstyling, drama, Indigenous cultural experiences, music, woodworking, yoga, meditation, and more.
Edmonton	STEM Collegiate Canada	---	2023	7-11 (with plans to expand to 12)	Focus on STEM education and digital technologies. Sister school to STEM Innovation Academy (Calgary).
Edmonton	Suzuki Charter School	---	1995	K–9	Teaches music using the Suzuki method of learning. The philosophy behind the methodology, originally developed by Shin'ichi Suzuki, extends into other areas of study.
Edmonton	The WISE Charter Society	The WISE Charter School	2024	K-9	Offers High-quality, evidence-based Waldorf education through an integrated curriculum that balances academic rigour, movement, arts, and creativity to support the development of each student’s highest physical, social-emotional, and intellectual potential.
Edmonton	Thrive Charter School	---	2023	K-6	Open to students from low socioeconomic status backgrounds who live in central/west Edmonton. Does not charge any program fees, and includes free busing, meals, extra-curriculuar clubs, extended school hours, and wrap-around services.
Genesee (nearWarburg)	Mother Earth's Children's Charter School (MECCS)	---	2003	K–9	Canada's only Indigenous charter school. Programming and learning based around values including the Medicine wheel, Seven Sacred Teachings (Respect, Love, Courage, Wisdom, Honesty, Humility, Truth) as a basis for action, and traditional Indigenous teaching and philosophies.
Gwynne	Gwynne Valley Rural Education Association (GVREA)	Gwynne Valley Rural Academy	**proposed for 2024	K-9 (with plans to expand to 10-12 by 2027).	Will be focused on horticulture, life skills, food security & sustainability, trades & vocation, finance & budgeting, Maskwacis learning partnerships & cultural exchanges, permaculture, animal husbandry, and resource management.
Holden	Holden Rural Academy Society	Holden Rural Academy	2022	7-12	Core courses in the morning, followed by afternoon options that include sports, fine arts, automotive & HD mechanics, woodworking & construction, culinary, Apprenticeship (through RAP) or work experience, or other off-campus or online programming.
Leduc	New Humble Community School Association	New Humble Community School	2022	K-9	"New Humble Community School is a public charter school located in Leduc County, Alberta. NHCS offers a unique learning experience through the use of agriculture, environment & stewardship as an instrument for experiential hands-on learning."
Medicine Hat	Centre for Academic and Personal Excellence (CAPE) Institute	---	1995	K–9	Individualized and integrated programs "aimed at helping underachieving but intellectually capable students strive for academic and personal excellence".
Sherwood Park	New Horizons Charter School Society	New Horizons Charter School	1995	K–9	The first charter school opened in Canada. Programming for gifted students.
Valhalla Centre	Valhalla School Foundation	Valhalla Community School	2008	K–9	Programming based around rural education and leadership, 'entrepreneurial culture', explicit phonics, second language (German or French, starting in Grade 1), cultural literacy, etiquette.

=== Former charters ===
Three charter school have closed:

- The Global Learning Academy, in Calgary, was granted a charter in 1996, and with 480 students was the largest charter school in the province. However, mismanagement and financial problems resulted in the suspension of its founding principal in December 1997, the replacement of its board of directors with a trustee in January 1998, and the revocation of the school's charter before the start of the 1998–1999 school year.
- The Moberly Hall Charter School, the only charter school hosted by a Roman Catholic school board, operated in Fort McMurray from 1997 to 2007 before voluntarily closing because of declining enrolment and rising costs.
- The Mundare Charter School was established in Mundare by parents in 1997 when the town's elementary/junior high school closed, but operated for only one year. It was absorbed into the local public school board as an alternative elementary school after low enrolment resulted in financial difficulty.

== See also ==
- List of school authorities in Alberta
