= Pinkham House =

House in Quincy, Massachusetts, on the National Register of Historic Places

- U.S. National Register of Historic Places
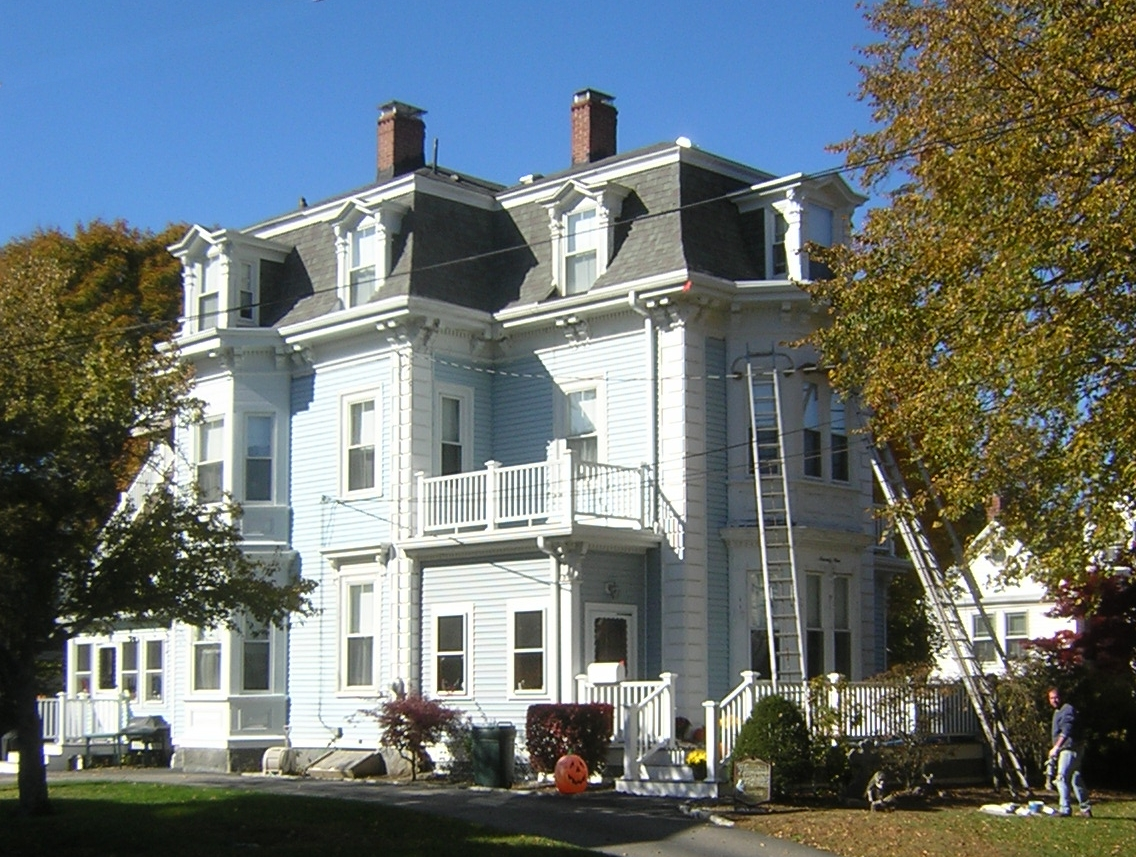

- Location within Massachusetts Location within the United States
- Location: 79 Winthrop Ave., Quincy, Massachusetts
- Coordinates: 42°15′42″N 71°1′10″W
- Built: 1870
- Architectural style: Second Empire
- MPS: Quincy MRA
- NRHP reference No.: 89001384
- Added to NRHP: September 20, 1989

The Pinkham House is a historic house at 79 Winthrop Avenue in the Wollaston Heights neighborhood of Quincy, Massachusetts. The 2 1/2-story wood-frame house was built in the 1870s by George Pinkham, the manager of the Wollaston Land Company, which developed Wollaston Heights, and is the only house in Quincy that has a direct association with the Pinkham family. The house is a handsome example of Second Empire styling, with a dormered flared mansard roof, quoined corners, and bracketed eaves.

The house was listed on the National Register of Historic Places in 1989.

== See also ==
- National Register of Historic Places listings in Quincy, Massachusetts
