= International Education Association of Western Canada =

- Type: not-for-profit organization
- Founded: 2013
- Headquarters: Calgary, Canada
- Area served: Canada, China, Japan
- Key people: managing director Richard Li
- Services: promoting Canadian education
- Number of employees: 6

The International Education Association of Western Canada (IEAWC), established in 2013, is one of Canada's international education associations. It is incorporated non-profit organization that fosters dialogue on international education policy. Their objective is to link researchers, teachers, government and education leaders and students between Canada and all around the world.

== History ==
The association was originally established in 2013, led by the BHTH Institution of Education. In 2012, the BHTH Institution of Education became representative of Canada Public School No.76, as known as Medicine Hat School District No.76. It wasn't until several months later that at least one school district from each Canadian western provinces agreed to join the association to promote Canada education. In the early of 2014, there are at least 4 Chinese education institutions have signed contracts with the member of IEAWC.

== Governance ==
The IEAWC is governed by two bodies, a managing board and a council. The managing director is Richard Li and the current president is Nathan Canuel.
