= Connect Charter School =

Conect charter schol
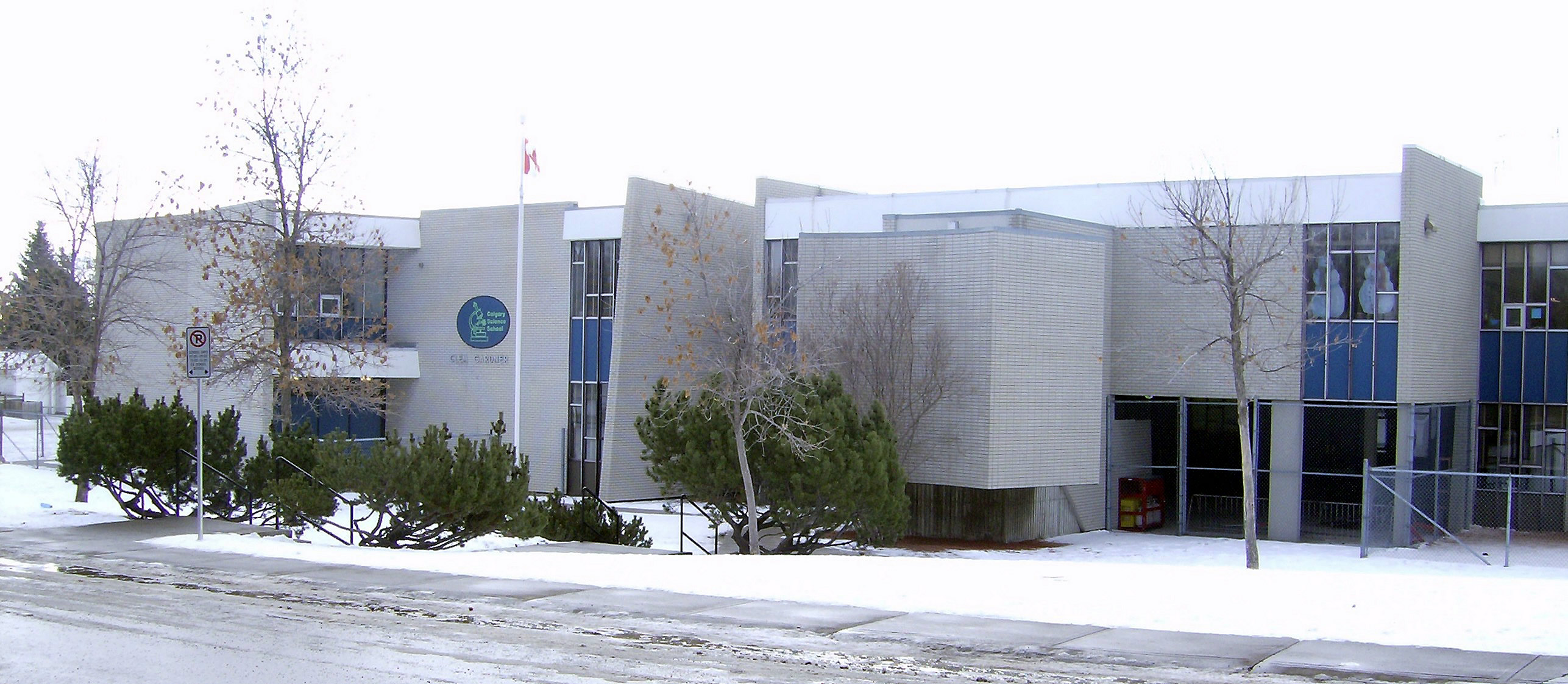

Location
- 5915 Lewis Drive SW; Calgary, Alberta, T3E 5Z4; Canada; 51°0′2.1″N 114°8′8.1″W

Information
- School type: Charter
- Motto: It's never just an ordinary day!
- Established: 1999; 27 years ago
- Superintendent: Chris Gilmour
- Principal: Shannon Bennett
- Grades: 4-9
- Enrollment: 624 (February 2021)
- Language: English
- Team name: The connect trailblazers
- Website: www.connectcharter.ca

The Connect Charter School, formerly the Calgary Science School, is a Canadian public charter school in Calgary, Alberta; which teaches grades four through nine.

== History ==
The school was established in 1998 as Calgary Science School and moved to its current location, formerly the Calgary Board of Education's Clem Gardner Elementary School, in 2002.

The school originally conducted placement testing to ensure average academic performance in students admitted to the school, but this is no longer the case. Students can enroll and be granted a spot in the school solely after being selected from the top of the wait list and paying annual enrichment fees, regardless of their academic performance or needs.

In July 2012, the school was granted a 15-year charter from the Alberta Government. The school was renamed to the Connect Charter School effective January 1, 2014.

== Today ==
At the time of writing, there are 104 students each in grades 4–9. Wait lists are held for each grade in the event of students leaving or transferring away.

Ten buses, owned and operated by Southland Bussing of Calgary service CCS, taking the majority of the kids to and from school every school day.

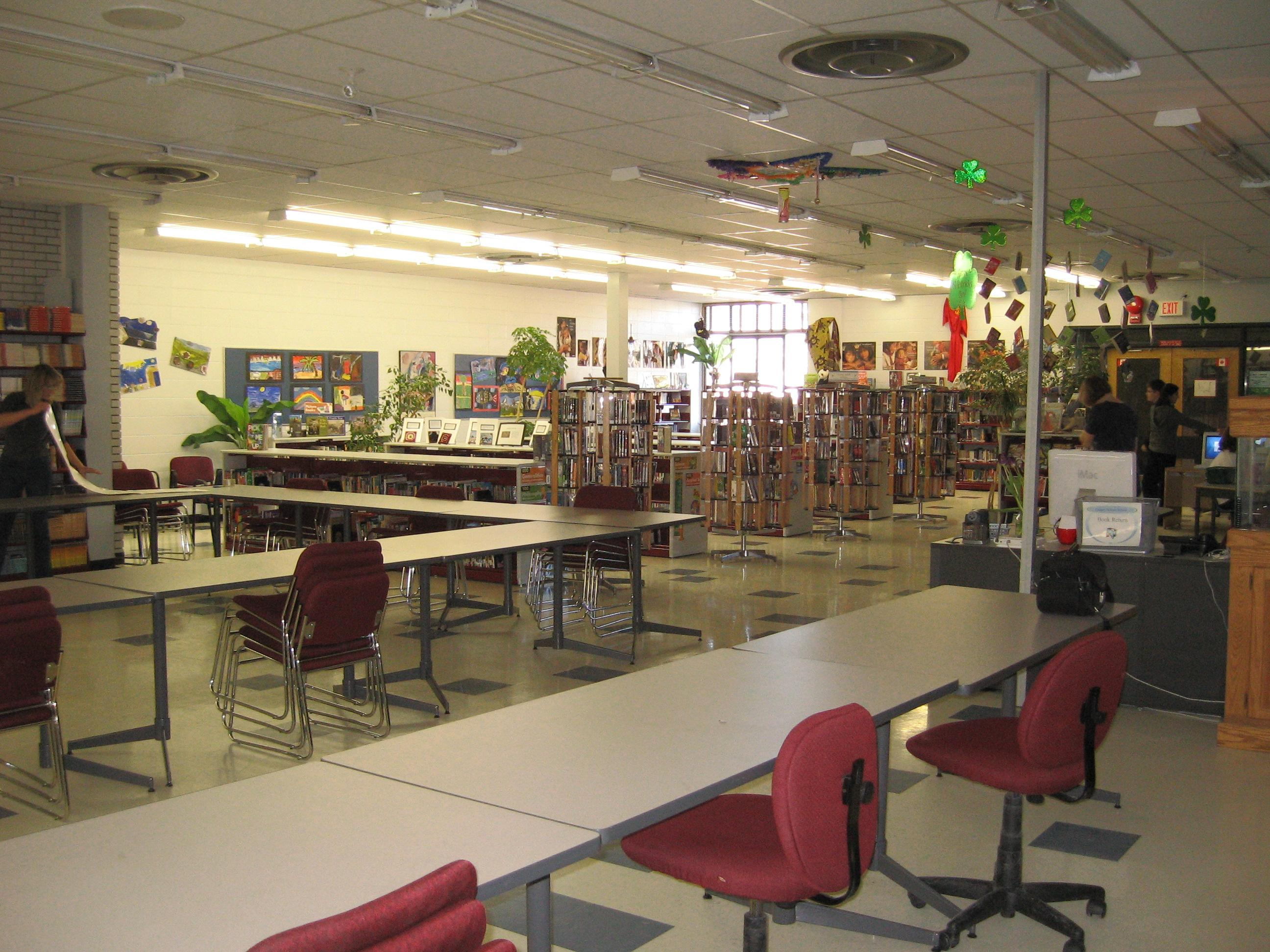
The library at CCS as seen in 2007

Currently, CCS has over 50 staff members, including janitorial staff, technical staff, office attendants, and those in charge of publications.

== Technology ==
CCS maintains a 1-to-1 student to computer ratio, and it finished the transition from a Windows to a Mac base in the beginning of the 2006–2007 school year. Due to an Emerging Technologies grant from Alberta Education, in the 2006–2007 and 2007–2008 school years, each student received their own Apple MacBook. Students continue to be provided an iPad as part of their enrichment fees and the school's efforts to integrate technology into inquiry-based learning.

All CCS classrooms are equipped with SMART board technology, and every classroom has a NEC projector and a screen. Classes use SMART boards for creative math and science debates/discussions. The Macintosh move was made to fully integrate Apple's Ecosystem into the CCS technology to have more control and surveillance over the students.

== School events ==
- ConnectED Canada Conference: The Calgary Science School hosted the first and second ConnectED Canada conferences. The conference hosted 156 delegates in the first year and 277 registered delegates from across Canada May 24–26, 2013.
- Innovate West: will be an annual conference held at the Connect Charter School, formerly the Calgary Science School, celebrating a network of forward thinking educators in western Canada.
- Lasers got Talent: Groups of students or single students will audition with pieces of music they make, sing and dance to a song or just show off their talents. The best ones perform in front of the whole school. The latest show was on October 30, 2009, when Chase Hadden showed of his yo-yo skills and Swish Goswami became MJ and performed "Smooth Criminal".
- Laser Idol: Students use their voices to sing just like in Canadian Idol, but the age requirement is between Grades 4 and 9, rather than between 16 and 28, just like on the show. Just like Laserband, the best singers are picked from the pack and put up on stage to perform for the school.
- Peace Festival: Students enter the gym and circle to many different stations that have different meaning. Since CSS has many races and religions within the walls, most of the stations represent just that. There are stations where you pinpoint on a world map where you're from, there is a station where you get your face painted, and one station in the 2006–2007 peace festival included fictional stories written by grade 8 students, that were designed to be realistic and show some of the problems street children in favelas in Brazil face every day.
- Lego League: The Calgary Science School periodically participates in the FIRST Lego League Challenge, as they have since the 2003 edition, Mission Mars. Students are invited to participate either at lunch times or in electives.

== Courses ==
From its first creation in 1999, Science Alberta School enforced a compulsory course known as SAS Quest. When the school was renamed as Calgary Science School, the program became Quest. The objective of this course was to familiarize students with everyday problems in the world and how to solve them. This program was removed in the 2004 school year.

For electives (options) there are many choices including: CO_{2} Cars, Digital Film Making, Photography, 3-D Design and Modelling, Animation, Outdoor Pursuits, Game Design, First Aid, and Dance.

Students in some classes have the option to do "Explorer Projects". They are able to pick any topic of their liking, and explore the question until answered. Students often have very wide ranges of subjects.

Recently, the plant room was turned into a woodworking shop, and now for grades 6 through 9, there is an elective started by Mr. Scott Petronech called CO^{2}-powered cars. Students carve and sand wooden cars, load them with CO_{2} canisters, and race them.
