= Calgary Girls Charter School =

Location
- Lakeview: 6304 Larkspur Way SW; Calgary, Alberta; Canada; 50.998°N 114.115°W

Information
- School type: Public charter
- Established: 2003
- Superintendent: Dani Sever
- Principal: Jenelee Jones
- Enrollment: 600 (2009/2010)
- Board chairs: Christine Jackson
- Operated by: Calgary Girls' School Society
- Website: www.calgarygirlsschool.com

Calgary Girls Charter School (CGCS) is an all-girl public charter school in Calgary, Alberta, Canada. It currently teaches grades 4–9.

Established in 2003, Calgary Girls Charter School follows the Alberta Education program of studies, with students having a complement of option courses from grades 4 through 9. In addition to student's core programming, CGCS teaches a locally developed program, Go Girls, with themes that centre in developing positive self-image and personal identity, building strong relationships, critically analyzing the world in which we live, deconstructing societal norms, contributing positively to our community, building leadership capacity and exploring strong girls and women who have been change makers.

As one of 23 charter schools in Alberta, CGCS operates with its own board of directors, and is accountable directly to the Minister of Education. As a public charter school, CGCS does not charge tuition to students, and serves students throughout all quadrants of the city of Calgary.

== Opposition ==
The Calgary Board of Education (CBE) and its main union are generally opposed to the idea of charter schools. Founders of the CGCS initially (as required by law) applied to exist within the Calgary Board of Education, prior to being authorized to open as a Charter School, as its own school division.
