= Boyle Street Education Centre =

Edmonton, Alberta school: age 14-19 (est. 1996)

Location
- 10312 - 105 Street; David H. Building; Edmonton, Alberta; Canada; 53°32′41″N 113°30′01″W

Information
- Type: Non-profit public charter
- Religious affiliation: None
- Established: September 1996
- Superintendent: Mavis Averill
- Board Chair: Cheyenne Mihko Kihêw
- Principal: Ken Smale
- Age range: 14 to 19
- Capacity: 170 students
- Last updated: March 2026

Boyle Street Education Centre (BSEC) is a non-profit public charter high school in Edmonton, Alberta, Canada. The Boyle Street Education Centre opened as a charter school in September 1996. The Education Centre grew out of six years of Boyle Street Co-op experience providing an alternative education program. The students, ranging from ages fourteen to nineteen, often do not succeed in mainstream education programs due to traumatic experiences in their early years. The Boyle Street Education Centre offer programs that engage high risk and out-of-school youth in the learning process and provide each student an opportunity for the successful attainment of the learning expectations as established by Alberta Learning.

Continuous enrollment has been identified by students trying to return to school as an important feature of the Education Centre. The teacher/student ratio is low, and students work on independent program plans appropriate to their abilities and interests.

The Education Centre offers the following services:

- Breakfast and lunch program prepared by Work Experience Students
- Earned transportation to and from school for students in need
- No school fees or school supply expenses
- School Liaison/Counselor for one-on-one intervention and outreach
- Registered Apprenticeship Program and Work Experience
- Low student/teacher ratio
- Guest speakers and field trips
- A variety of CTS and option classes are available
- Career and Post Secondary counseling
- First Nation's cultural programming including Sweats, Drumming, Girls'/Boys' Talking Circle, and other cultural activities
- Advocating on behalf of students with numerous social service agencies, including Learner Benefits, Children and Family Services, and Probation Officers/Fine Options
- Whole school approach to education including numerous support services are available for students

The philosophy of the school focuses on ensuring that socially, economically and otherwise disadvantaged students have the opportunity for full and equal participation in the life of Alberta. The Centre believes that the provision of a holistic education program within the context of a multi-disciplinary community model and a supportive environment will maximize opportunities for students and that such education must be student-centered and student-driven.

== Organization ==
Starting in the 1980s, the then Boyle Street Co-op, now renamed Boyle Street Community Services, worked with troubled youth to help them get back into the education system, along with other problems they had. In September 1996 they obtained a charter for BSEC to accomplish this as an independent school. Boyle Street Community Services and BSEC are technically two distinct organizations but work very closely together, with Boyle Street continuing to provide a variety of services that go beyond a school's normal function. The charter school initially kept the original location of the Co-op but moved to its current location in September 2004. As with the other 12 charter schools in the province, the school is directly accountable to the province and Alberta Education.
