= 2010 Alberta municipal elections =

- October 18, 2010
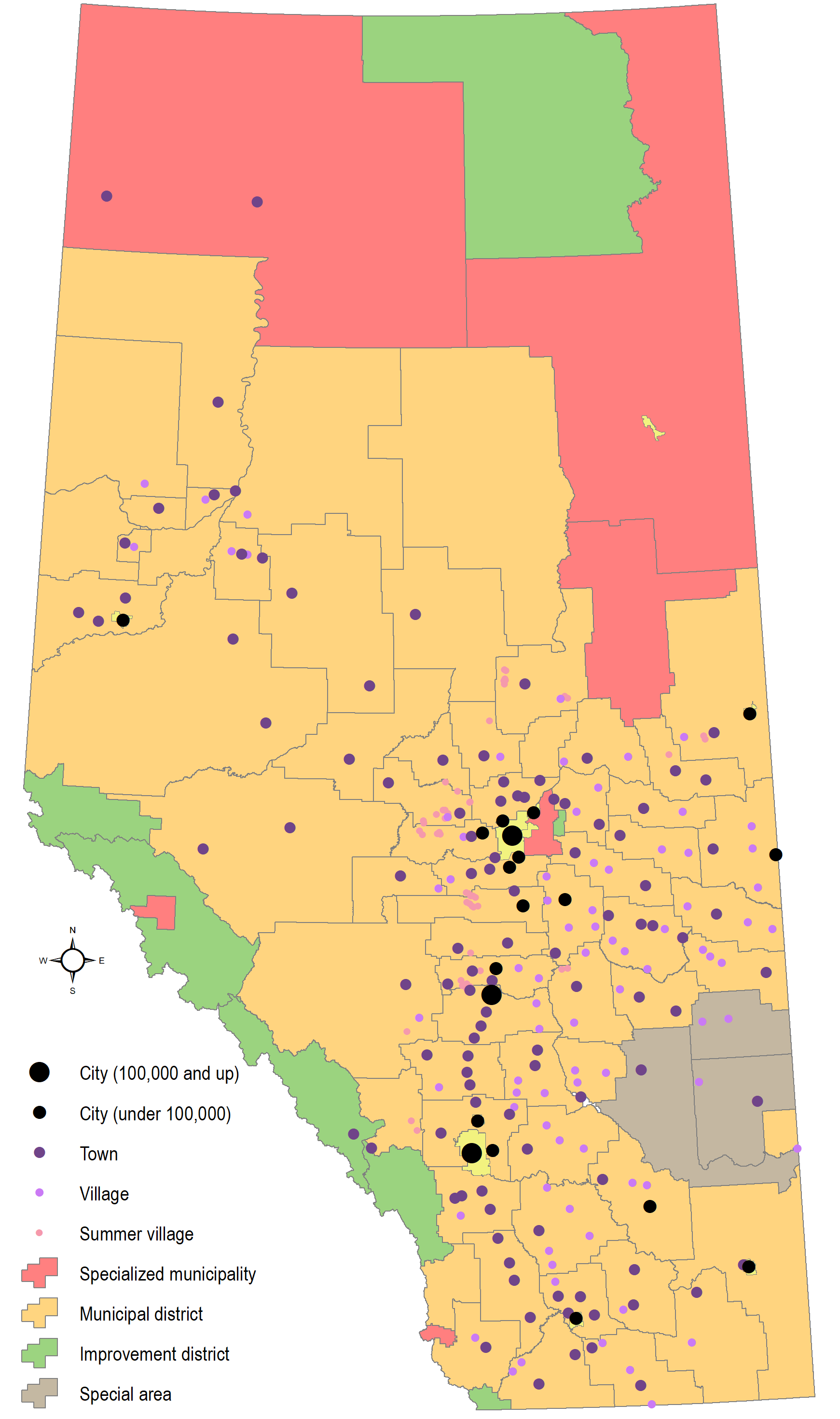
- Alberta's 344 municipalities (19 cities, 106 towns, 80 villages, 51 summer villages, 6 specialized municipalities, 63 municipal districts, 7 improvement districts, and 3 special areas) as of July 2021

Municipal elections were held in Alberta, Canada on Monday, October 18, 2010. Since 1968, provincial legislation has required every municipality to hold triennial elections. Mayors (reeves), councillors (aldermen), and trustees were elected to office in 16 of the 17 cities, all 108 towns, all 95 villages, all 5 specialized municipalities, all 64 municipal districts, 3 of the 7 improvement districts, and the advisory councils of the 3 special areas. The City of Lloydminster is on the Saskatchewan schedule (every three years), and held elections on October 28, 2009 and October 24, 2012, while 4 improvement districts (Nos. 12, 13, 24, and 25) have no councils and are led solely by the Minister of Municipal Affairs. Since the 2007 municipal elections, the villages of Derwent, Kinuso, New Sarepta, and Thorhild were dissolved, the Municipality of Crowsnest Pass changed from town to specialized municipality status, and the Town of Lacombe became a city.

== Cities ==
Bold indicates elected, and incumbents are italicized.

=== Airdrie ===
City of Airdrie
Mayor			Aldermen		
Candidate	Votes	%	Candidate	Votes	%
**Peter Brown**	**4,047**	**47.6**	**Murray Buchanan**	**4,926**	**57.9**
Linda Bruce	2,968	34.9	**Fred Burley**	**4,020**	**47.2**
Ross Mann	1,447	17.0	**Kelly Hegg**	**3,971**	**46.7**
Edward Skelding	46	0.5	**Ron Chapman**	**3,462**	**40.7**
			**Glenda Alexander**	**3,251**	**38.2**
			**Allan Hunter**	**2,259**	**26.6**
			Darrell Belyk	2,252	26.5
			Taylor Evan Farthing	2,009	23.6
			Corina Bohnet	1,962	23.1
			Jeff Willerton	1,894	22.3
			Dave Pollard	1,680	19.7
			Wendy Potter-Duhaime	1,503	17.7
			Tim Elliott	1,478	17.4
			Jennifer Berg	1,454	17.1
			Carolyn Friend	1,328	15.6
			Kevin Hughes	1,327	15.6
			Rachelle Annette Elizabeth Reed	940	11.0
			Trevor Ford Cameron	678	8.0
			Sharron Harripersad	671	7.9
			Vernon Sinnott	350	4.1

In the 2010 elections, the citizens of Airdrie elected one mayor and six aldermen (all at large), and participated in electing two of the Rocky View School Division's seven trustees (West Airdrie being Ward 7, & East Airdrie being part of Ward 3), and one of the Calgary Catholic School District's seven trustees (being part of Ward 3/5).

=== Brooks ===
City of Brooks
Mayor			Councillors		
Candidate	Votes	%	Candidate	Votes	%
**Martin Shields**	**2,141**	**86.1**	**Barry Morishita**	**1,448**	**58.2**
Patrick Ketchmark	346	13.9	**Kimberley Sharkey**	**1,395**	**56.1**
			**Bill Prentice**	**1,359**	**54.6**
			**Noel Mariyama**	**1,213**	**48.8**
			**Ron Yewchuk**	**1,128**	**45.4**
			**Norman Gerestein**	**1,121**	**45.1**
			Keith Boquist	978	39.3
			Inge Ellefson	913	36.7
			Rolf Bander	904	36.3
			Clayton Johnson	776	31.2
			Ahmed Kassem	519	20.9
			Steve Norris	461	18.5
			Michael Mayen	430	17.3

In the 2010 elections, the citizens of Brooks elected one mayor and six councillors (all at large), and participated in electing some of the Grasslands Regional Division No. 6's six trustees, and one of the Christ the Redeemer Catholic Separate Regional Division No. 3's eight trustees.

=== Calgary ===
In the 2010 elections, the citizens of Calgary elected one mayor, 14 aldermen (one from each of 14 wards), the seven Calgary School District trustees (each representing 2 of 14 wards), and four of the seven Calgary Catholic School District trustees (each representing 2 of 14 wards).

=== Camrose ===
City of Camrose
Mayor			Councillors		
Candidate	Votes	%	Candidate	Votes	%
**Marshall Chalmers**	**2,016**	**36.3**	**Daryl Shillington**	**3,112**	**56.1**
Ina Nielsen	1,603	28.9	**Max Lindstrand**	**3,078**	**55.4**
Clarence Mastel	1,387	25.0	**Ray McIsaac**	**2,774**	**50.0**
Mervin (Merv) Griffin	545	9.8	**Gregory (Greg) Wood**	**2,653**	**47.8**
			**Gerry Galenza**	**2,513**	**45.3**
			**Brandon Blatz**	**2,142**	**38.6**
			**John Alan (John) Howard**	**2,077**	**37.4**
			**Earle Berry**	**1,965**	**35.4**
			Thomas (Tom) Banack	1,808	32.6
			Pat Mader Mundel	1,738	31.3
			Melvin (Mel) Sabeski	1,487	26.8
			Keith Elliott	1,417	25.5
			Gregory (Greg) Chrabaszcz	1,154	20.8
			Clinton (Clint) Davenport	1,112	20.0
			Konrad Schellenberg	884	15.9
			Roy Virtue	811	14.6
			Paul Gauthier	562	10.1

In the 2010 elections, the citizens of Camrose elected one mayor, eight councillors (all at large), two of the Battle River Regional Division No. 31's eight trustees (as Ward Camrose), and one of the Elk Island Catholic Separate Regional Division No. 41's seven trustees (as Ward Camrose).

=== Cold Lake ===
City of Cold Lake
Mayor			Councillors		
Candidate	Votes	%	Candidate	Votes	%
**Craig Copeland**	**2,253**	**81.8**	**Kelvin Plain**	**1,820**	**66.1**
Debra Pelechosky	500	18.2	**Bob Buckle**	**1,622**	**58.9**
			**Chris Vining**	**1,313**	**47.7**
			**Duane Lay**	**1,243**	**45.2**
			**Darrell MacDonald**	**1,166**	**42.4**
			**Vicky Lefebvre**	**1,084**	**39.4**
			Keith Rieder	1,035	37.6
			Hubert Rodden	1,012	36.8
			Ajaz Quraishi	758	27.5
			Chris N. Hiebert	658	23.9
			Jeff Bentley	608	22.1
			Colleen McEntee	519	18.9
			Anita Berwick-Miller	397	14.4
			Julia Cornester	265	9.6

In the 2010 elections, the citizens of Cold Lake elected one mayor, six councillors (all at large), three of the Northern Lights School Division No. 69's nine trustees (as Ward 2), and three of the Lakeland Roman Catholic Separate School District No. 150's seven trustees (as Ward Cold Lake).

=== Edmonton ===
In the 2010 elections, the citizens of Edmonton elected one mayor, 12 councillors (one from each of 12 wards), seven of the nine Edmonton Public Schools trustees (one from each of nine wards), and the seven Edmonton Catholic School District trustees (one from each of seven wards).

=== Fort Saskatchewan ===
City of Fort Saskatchewan
Mayor			Councillors		
Candidate	Votes	%	Candidate	Votes	%
**Gale Katchur**	**2,858**	**54.8**	**Ed van Delden**	**2,865**	**55.0**
Jim Sheasgreen	2,354	45.2	**Stew Hennig**	**2,801**	**53.7**
			**John Mather**	**2,540**	**48.7**
			**Frank Garritsen**	**2,538**	**48.7**
			**Tom Hutchison**	**2,455**	**47.1**
			**Don Westman**	**2,421**	**46.5**
			Harold Brookman	2,380	45.7
			Stuart McGowan	1,818	34.9
			Dallas Kristiansen	1,600	30.7
			Reece Karl Sellin	1,282	24.6

In the 2010 elections, the citizens of Fort Saskatchewan elected one mayor, six councillors (all at large), two of the Elk Island Public Schools Regional Division No. 14's nine trustees (as Ward Fort Saskatchewan), and one of the Elk Island Catholic Separate Regional Division No. 41's seven trustees (as Ward Fort Saskatchewan).

=== Grande Prairie ===
City of Grande Prairie
Mayor			Aldermen		
Candidate	Votes	%	Candidate	Votes	%
**Bill Given**	**3,451**	**38.1**	**Lorne Radbourne**	**5,808**	**64.1**
Dwight Logan	3,298	36.4	**Dan Wong**	**5,577**	**61.5**
Gladys Blackmore	2,092	23.1	**Helen A. Rice**	**5,273**	**58.2**
Dale Robertson	136	1.5	**Alex Gustafson**	**4,622**	**51.0**
Nasim Khan	86	0.9	**Justin Munroe**	**3,771**	**41.6**
			**Kevin McLean**	**3,289**	**36.3**
			**John A. Croken**	**3,214**	**35.5**
			**Kevin P. O'Toole**	**3,165**	**34.9**
			Chris Thiessen	2,975	32.8
			Bert Auger	2,768	30.5
			Rob McLeod	2,423	26.7
			Eileen Robertson	2,355	26.0
			Erin Steidel	2,294	25.3
			Colby Whipple	1,985	21.9

In the 2010 elections, the citizens of Grande Prairie elected one mayor, eight aldermen (all at large), the five Grande Prairie School District No. 2357 trustees (at large), and five of the Grande Prairie Roman Catholic Separate School District No. 28's seven trustees (as Ward 1).

=== Lacombe ===
City of Lacombe
Mayor			Councillors		
Candidate	Votes	%	Candidate	Votes	%
**Steve Christie**	**1,732**	**60.2**	**Peter Bouwsema**	**1,805**	**62.8**
Bill McQuesten	1,144	39.8	**Outi Kite**	**1,623**	**56.4**
			**Ian Foster**	**1,610**	**56.0**
			**Reuben Konnik**	**1,557**	**54.1**
			**Wayne Rempel**	**1,544**	**53.7**
			**Grant Creasey**	**1,519**	**52.8**
			Joanne Boruck	1,463	50.9
			Nik Willing	1,389	48.3
			Dawn Parent	1,184	41.2

In the 2010 elections, the citizens of Lacombe elected one mayor and six councillors (all at large), and participated in electing two of the Wolf Creek School Division No. 72's six trustees, and one of the St. Thomas Aquinas Roman Catholic Separate Regional Division No. 38's nine trustees.

=== Leduc ===
City of Leduc
Mayor			Aldermen	
Candidate	Votes	%	Candidate	Votes
**Greg Krischke**	**Acclaimed**		**Dana L. Smith**	**2,538**
			**Dominic Mishio**	**2,538**
			**Bob Young**	**2,219**
			**David Mackenzie**	**2,073**
			**Terry Lazowski**	**1,909**
			**Glen W. Finstad**	**1,879**
			Sherry Fraser	1,660
			Harry Pedersen	1,417
			Linda Raymond	1,244
			Russ Luke	1,233
			Richard (Lefty) Michalyk	1,042
			Mitch Cammidge	703
			Bob Howard	533

In the 2010 elections, the citizens of Leduc elected six alderman (at large), two of the Black Gold Regional Schools' seven trustees (as Ward Leduc), and two of the St. Thomas Aquinas Roman Catholic Separate Regional Division No. 38's nine trustees (as from Ward Leduc). The incumbent mayor was unchallenged.

=== Lethbridge ===
In the 2010 elections, the citizens of Lethbridge elected one mayor, eight alderman (all at large), none of the seven Lethbridge School District No. 51 trustees, and five of the Holy Spirit Roman Catholic Separate Regional Division No. 4's nine trustees (as Ward 2). However, one alderman-elect died before being sworn in, his vacancy was filled on February 1, 2011, by the 2010 runner-up.

=== Medicine Hat ===
City of Medicine Hat
Mayor			Aldermen		
Candidate	Votes	%	Candidate	Votes	%
**Normand Boucher**	**7,366**	**44.8**	**Wayne Craven**	**10,715**	**65.2**
Julie Friesen	6,923	42.1	**Ted Clugston**	**10,161**	**61.8**
Scott Cowan	2,151	13.1	**Graham Kelly**	**9,267**	**56.4**
			**Robert C. Dumanowski**	**9,067**	**55.2**
			**John Hamill**	**8,013**	**48.7**
			**Jeremy O. Thompson**	**7,651**	**46.5**
			**Phil Turnbull**	**7,393**	**45.0**
			**Les Pearson**	**6,931**	**42.2**
			Brian Varga	6,742	41.0
			George Webb	4,782	29.1
			Wayne Ziegler	4,561	27.7
			Pat Kraus	3,798	23.1

In the 2010 elections, the citizens of Medicine Hat elected one mayor, eight alderman (all at large), the five Medicine Hat School District No. 76 trustees (at large), and four of the Medicine Hat Catholic Separate Regional Division No. 20's five trustees (as Ward Medicine Hat).

=== Red Deer ===
Mayor
Candidate	Votes	%
**Morris Flewwelling**	**8,100**	**56.6**
Hilary Penko	6,219	43.4

Councillors
Candidate	Votes	%
**Tara Veer**	**10,311**	**72.0**
**Cindy Jefferies**	**9,278**	**64.8**
**Dianne Wyntjes**	**7,783**	**54.4**
**Chris Stephan**	**7,259**	**50.7**
**Lynne Mulder**	**6,857**	**46.0**
**S.H. (Buck) Buchanan**	**6,800**	**47.5**
**Frank Wong**	**6,733**	**47.0**
**Paul Harris**	**6,449**	**45.0**
Gail M. Parks	5,902	41.2
TerryLee Ropchan	4,962	34.7
Jason Chilibeck	4,838	33.8
Jeffrey Dawson	4,202	29.3
Jim Watters	4,004	28.0
Calvin Yzerman	3,538	24.7
Clarence Torgerson	2,944	20.6
Matt Chapin	1,625	11.3

Red Deer School District No. 104
Candidate	Votes	%
**Bill Stuebing**	**6,583**	**97.7**
**Bev Manning**	**6,089**	**90.3**
**Dianne Macaulay**	**4,756**	**70.6**
**Lawrence Lee**	**4,680**	**69.4**
**Bill Christie**	**4,513**	**66.9**
**Dick Lemke**	**4,058**	**60.2**
**Cathy Peacocke**	**3,836**	**56.9**
Lisa Johnston	3,633	53.9
Lianne Kruger	3,418	50.7
Kaliana Johnston	3,179	47.2
Matthew Chapin	2,439	36.2

Red Deer Catholic Regional Division No. 39
Red Deer Ward			Highway 11 Ward			QE II Ward		
Candidate	Votes	%	Candidate	Votes	%	Candidate	Votes	%
**Adriana LaGrange**	2,236	79.2	**Liam McNiff**	**Acclaimed**		**Dianne J. MacKay**	**271**	62.6
**Guy Pelletier**	2,164	76.6				Tanya Schaber	162	37.4
**Elaine Halter**	2,042	72.3						
**Anne Marie Watson**	2,014	71.3						
**David F. Bouchard**	1,979	70.1						
Christine Moore	1,937	68.6						
Duane Rolheiser	1,748	61.9						

In the 2010 elections, the citizens of Red Deer, Alberta, elected one mayor, eight councillors (all at large) to the Red Deer City Council, the seven Red Deer School District No. 104 trustees (at large), and five of the Red Deer Catholic Regional Division No. 39's seven trustees (as Red Deer Ward). Based on the mayoral vote turnout, of the estimated 59,942 eligible voters, the voter turnout was 23.9%.

=== Spruce Grove ===
City of Spruce Grove
Mayor			Aldermen	
Candidate	Votes	%	Candidate	Votes
**Stuart Houston**	**Acclaimed**		**Jeff Acker**	**2,870**
			**Searle Turton**	**2,293**
			**Wayne Rothe**	**2,122**
			**Bill Kesanko**	**2,040**
			**Louise Baxter**	**2,000**
			**Bill Steinburg**	**1,893**
			John Acevedo	1,849
			Jeremy McConnell	1,564
			Glenn Jensen	1,541
			Ann Gillie	1,343

In the 2010 elections, the citizens of Spruce Grove elected six alderman (at large), and two of the Parkland School Division No. 70's seven trustees (as Ward 5), and participated in electing three of the Evergreen Catholic Separate Regional Division No. 2's eight trustees (as Ward 2). The incumbent mayor was unchallenged.

=== St. Albert ===
City of St. Albert
Mayor			Councillors		
Candidate	Votes	%	Candidate	Votes	%
**Nolan Crouse**	**10,778**	**68.5**	**Cathy Heron**	**9,904**	**63.0**
Shelly Biermanski	4,955	31.5	**Cam MacKay**	**7,565**	**48.1**
			**Malcolm Parker**	**7,030**	**44.7**
			**Len Bracko**	**6,590**	**41.9**
			**Wes Brodhead**	**6,467**	**41.1**
			**Roger Lemieux**	**6,176**	**39.3**
			J.C. (James) Burrows	6,162	39.2
			Gareth Jones	5,893	37.5
			Stanley Haroun	5,297	33.7
			James Van Damme	4,834	30.7
			Norm Harley	4,633	29.4
			Robyn Morrison	4,627	29.4
			Aisling Pollard-Kientzel	2,897	18.4

In the 2010 elections, the citizens of St. Albert elected one mayor, six councillors (all at large), four of the Greater St. Albert Catholic (Public) Schools' seven trustees (as Ward St. Albert), and the five St. Albert Protestant Separate School Division No. 6 trustees (at large).

=== Wetaskiwin ===
City of Wetaskiwin
Mayor			Aldermen		
Candidate	Votes	%	Candidate	Votes	%
**Bill Elliot**	**1,166**	**35.9**	**Joe Branco**	**2,033**	**62.6**
Brian Hockin	970	29.9	**Dale Crabtree**	**1,815**	**55.9**
Theresa Fuller	711	21.9	**Patricia MacQuarrie**	**1,659**	**51.1**
Don Montgomery	402	12.4	**Glenn Ruecker**	**1,546**	**47.6**
			**Barry Hawkes**	**1,480**	**45.6**
			**Mark McFaul**	**1,479**	**45.5**
			Gail Taylor	1,434	44.1
			Robert Behiels	1,198	36.9
			Jason Wright	1,126	34.7
			Larry Kumpitz	897	27.6
			Gwen Britton	436	13.4
			Bernard Paranych	236	7.3

In the 2010 elections, the citizens of Wetaskiwin elected one mayor, six aldermen (all at large), and three of the Wetaskiwin Regional Division No. 11's eight trustees (as Ward City), and participated in electing two of the St. Thomas Aquinas Roman Catholic Separate Regional Division No. 38's nine trustees (as Ward Wetaskiwin).

== Towns ==
The following are the election results for Alberta towns with a population over 7,500. Bold indicates elected, and incumbents are italicized.

=== Banff ===
Town of Banff
Mayor			Councillors		
Candidate	Votes	%	Candidate	Votes	%
**Karen Sorensen**	**Acclaimed**		**Leslie Taylor**	**1,138**	**70.3**
			**Stavros Karlos**	**1,063**	**65.7**
			**Paul Baxter**	**890**	**55.0**
			**Chip Olver**	**886**	**54.7**
			**Brian Standish**	**786**	**48.5**
			**Grant Canning**	**784**	**48.4**
			Maureen Vanmackelbergh	620	38.3
			Kerry-Lee Schultheis	472	29.2
			Stephen Allen	255	15.8

In the 2010 elections, the citizens of Banff elected six councillors (at large) and three of the Canadian Rockies Regional Division No. 12's seven trustees. A former councillor ran for mayor unchallenged.

=== Beaumont ===
Town of Beaumont
Mayor			Councillors		
Candidate	Votes	%	Candidate	Votes	%
**Camille Bérubé**	**1,579**	**61.1**	**Jay Archibald**	**1,770**	**68.5**
Gil Poitras	1,006	38.9	**Bill McNamara**	**1,743**	**67.4**
			**Louise White-Gibbs**	**1,677**	**64.9**
			**John Stewart**	**1,517**	**58.7**
			**Jacqueline Biollo**	**1,510**	**58.4**
			**Larry Goodhope**	**1,505**	**58.2**
			Bruce LeCren	1,442	55.8

In the 2010 elections, the citizens of Beaumont elected one mayor, six councillors (all at large), and one of the Black Gold Regional Schools' seven trustees, and participated in electing one of the St. Thomas Aquinas Roman Catholic Separate Regional Division No. 38's nine trustees.

=== Canmore ===
Town of Canmore
Mayor			Councillors		
Candidate	Votes	%	Candidate	Votes	%
**Ron Casey**	**1,952**	**53.1**	**Ed Russell**	**1,809**	**49.2**
Pam Hilstad	1,722	46.9	**John Borrowman**	**1,611**	**43.8**
			**Gordie Miskow**	**1,502**	**40.9**
			**Joanna McCallum**	**1,404**	**38.2**
			**Jim Ridley**	**1,400**	**38.1**
			**Hans Helder**	**1,391**	**37.9**
			Kristy Davison	1,219	33.2
			Louis Desroches	1,214	33.0
			Ric Proctor	1,159	31.5
			Jason Knudtson	1,094	29.8
			Donna Scott	1,055	28.7
			Bob Warwick	828	22.5
			Jeff Caskenette	788	21.4
			Jesse Guest	742	20.2
			Jude Sternloff	593	16.1
			Wade Graham	444	12.1
			Mathew Brouillet	397	10.8
			James Louden	142	3.9

In the 2010 elections, the citizens of Canmore elected one mayor and six councillors (all at large), and participated in electing three of the Canadian Rockies Regional Division No. 12's seven trustees, and one of the Christ the Redeemer Catholic Separate Regional Division No. 3's eight trustees.

==== By-election ====
Canmore by-election
Mayor			Councillors		
Candidate	Votes	%	Candidate	Votes	%
**John Borrowman**	**1,461**	**48.3**	**Vi Sandford**	**1,365**	**44.9**
Pam Hilstad	1,052	34.8	**Sean Krausert**	**1,089**	**35.8**
Ed Russell	511	16.9	Rob Seeley	952	31.3
			Karen Greene	932	30.6
			Jason Best	319	10.5
			Victor Zablotni	306	10.1
			Shirley Ketterer	292	9.6
			James Louden	76	2.5
			Brian Hyland	33	1.1

After Mayor Ron Casey left council, a by-election was scheduled for June 19, 2012, to fill the empty seat. Two incumbent Councillors also resigned, and ran for mayor.

=== Chestermere ===
Town of Chestermere
Mayor			Councillors		
Candidate	Votes	%	Candidate	Votes	%
**Patricia Matthews**	**Acclaimed**		**Patrick Bergen**	**1,595**	**67.4**
			**Heather Davies**	**1,593**	**67.7**
			**Kelsey Johnson**	**1,561**	**66.0**
			**Stewart Hutchison**	**1,526**	**64.5**
			**Christopher Steeves**	**1,521**	**64.3**
			**Terry Leighton**	**1,299**	**54.9**
			Keith Crowder	1,172	49.6
			Kam Khamba	618	26.1
			Harwinder Mangat	357	15.1
			Jasbir Dhari	347	14.7

In the 2010 elections, the citizens of Chestermere elected six councillors (at large), and participated in electing one of the Rocky View School Division No. 41's seven trustees and one of the Calgary Catholic School District's seven trustees. The incumbent mayor was unchallenged.

=== Cochrane ===
Town of Cochrane
Mayor			Councillors		
Candidate	Votes	%	Candidate	Votes	%
**Truper McBride**	**2,235**	**56.0**	**Joann Churchill**	**2,472**	**61.9**
Mike Anderson	1,757	44.0	**Jeff Toews**	**2,302**	**57.7**
			**Ivan Davies**	**2,277**	**57.0**
			**Tara McFadden**	**2,162**	**54.2**
			**Ivan Brooker**	**2,082**	**52.2**
			**Ross Watson**	**1,898**	**47.5**
			Miles Chester	1,770	44.3
			Brenda Sine	1,671	41.9
			Ron Knowles	1,626	40.7
			Judy Stewart	1,593	39.9

In the 2010 elections, the citizens of Cochrane elected one mayor, six councillors (all at large), and one of the Rocky View School Division's seven trustees, and participated in electing one of the Calgary Catholic School District's seven trustees.

=== Drumheller ===
Town of Drumheller
Mayor			Councillors		
Candidate	Votes	%	Candidate	Votes	%
**Terry Yemen**	**1,276**	**51.5**	**Jay Garbutt**	**1,522**	**61.4**
Tara Semchuk	1,204	48.5	**Tom Zariski**	**1,373**	**55.4**
			**Lisa Hansen-Zacharuk**	**1,205**	**48.6**
			**Doug Stanford**	**1,192**	**48.1**
			**Sharel M. Shoff**	**1,088**	**43.9**
			**Andrew Berdahl**	**1,020**	**41.1**
			Sandy Brown	838	33.8
			Tom Armstrong	795	32.1
			Blaine McDonald	728	29.4
			Bob Hannah	699	28.2
			Mike Hansen	575	23.2
			Ed Lehn	534	21.5
			Zrinko Amerl	272	11.0

In the 2010 elections, the citizens of Drumheller elected one mayor, six councillors (all at large), and one of the Golden Hills School Division No. 75's six trustees, and participated in electing one of the Christ the Redeemer Catholic Separate Regional Division No. 3's eight trustees.

=== Edson ===
Town of Edson
Mayor			Councillors		
Candidate	Votes	%	Candidate	Votes	%
**Greg Pasychny**	**Acclaimed**		**Kevin Zahara**	**826**	63.7
			**Tammy Strang**	**807**	62.3
			**Gean Chouinard**	**758**	58.5
			**Brian Boyce**	**719**	55.5
			**Jim Gomuwka**	**633**	48.8
			**Louise Connolly**	**606**	46.8
			Leigh Friesen	561	43.3
			Carlo Klemm	545	42.1
			Tim Ward	532	41.0

In the 2010 elections, the citizens of Edson elected six councillors (all at large) and two of the Grande Yellowhead Public School Division No. 77's seven trustees, and participated in electing two of the Living Waters Catholic Regional Division No. 42's six trustees. The incumbent mayor was unchallenged.

=== High River ===
Town of High River
Mayor			Councillors		
Candidate	Votes	%	Candidate	Votes	%
**Emile Blokland**	**2,461**	**65.6**	**Don Moore**	**2,676**	**71.4**
Mark Pearl	1,288	34.4	**Betty Hiebert**	**2,244**	**59.9**
			**Chuck Boutland**	**1,838**	**49.0**
			**Jamie Kinghorn**	**1,675**	**44.7**
			**Tim Whitford**	**1,646**	**43.9**
			**Al Brander**	**1,619**	**43.2**
			Sheila Storoschuk	1,388	37.0
			Bob McCracken	1,371	36.6
			Ivan Perich	862	23.0
			Richard Murray	828	22.1
			Bob Shilson	665	17.7
			Gary Weiss	529	14.1
			Roger Higham	444	11.8
			Dave McEvoy	384	10.2

In the 2010 elections, the citizens of High River elected one mayor, six councillors (all at large), and one of the Foothills School Division No. 38's five trustees, and participated in electing one of the Christ the Redeemer Catholic Separate Regional Division No. 3's eight trustees.

=== Hinton ===
Town of Hinton
Mayor			Councillors		
Candidate	Votes	%	Candidate	Votes	%
**Glenn Taylor**	**1,537**	**59.1**	**Dale Currie**	**1,817**	**69.9**
Chris Bell	1,063	40.9	**Bill Bulger**	**1,555**	**59.8**
			**Ian Duncan**	**1,514**	**58.2**
			**Stephen Mitchell**	**1,429**	**55.0**
			**Janice Callihoo**	**1,350**	**51.9**
			**Jane Macridis**	**1,346**	**51.8**
			Buzz Johnson	1,261	48.5
			Rick Grinnell	913	35.1

In the 2010 elections, the citizens of Hinton elected one mayor and six councillors (all at large), and two of the Grande Yellowhead Regional Division No. 35's seven trustees, and participated in electing one of the Evergreen Catholic Separate Regional Division No. 2's eight trustees.

==== By-election ====
Hinton By-election
Mayor		Councillors	
Candidate	Votes	Candidate	Votes
**Ian Duncan**	**Acclaimed**	**Lorraine Johnston-Mackay**	**582**
		**Ryan Maguhn**	**512**
		George Higgerty	390
		Rick Grinnell	283
		Anton (Tony) Sitar	176

After it was announced that Councillor Stephen Mitchell, and Mayor Glenn Taylor, would be leaving council, a by-election was scheduled for February 27, 2012, to fill the empty seats. Incumbent Councillor Ian Duncan also resigned, and ran for mayor unchallenged.

=== Innisfail ===
Town of Innisfail
Mayor			Councillors		
Candidate	Votes	%	Candidate	Votes	%
**Jim Romane**	**926**	**51.5**	**Mark Kemball**	**1,406**	**78.2**
Patt Churchill	872	48.5	**Jason Heistad**	**1,339**	**74.5**
			**Brian Spiller**	**1,111**	**61.8**
			**Derek Baird**	**917**	**51.0**
			**Heather Taylor**	**880**	**48.9**
			**Tracey Walker**	**852**	**47.4**
			Sarah Strauss (Emrich)	724	40.3
			Barbara Dixon	696	38.7
			Jack Zenert	334	18.6
			Marcel Keays	205	11.4

In the 2010 elections, the citizens of Innisfail elected one mayor and six councillors (all at large), and participated in electing one of the Chinook's Edge School Division No. 73's nine trustees and one of the Red Deer Catholic Regional Division No. 39's seven trustees. With the past mayor retiring, the successful mayoral candidate defeated an incumbent councillor for the mayor's chair.

=== Morinville ===
Town of Morinville
Mayor			Councillors		
Candidate	Votes	%	Candidate	Votes	%
**R. Lloyd Bertschi**	**965**	**54.0**	**Gordon Boddez**	**1,088**	**60.9**
Joseph Trapani	823	46.0	**Paul Krauskopf**	**1,050**	**58.7**
			**Lisa Holmes**	**1,007**	**56.3**
			**Nicole Boutestein**	**913**	**51.1**
			**David Pattison**	**812**	**45.4**
			**Ben Van DeWalle**	**777**	**43.5**
			Donna Phinney	758	42.4
			Jackie Luker-Chevalier	683	38.2
			Kerry Knight	672	37.6
			Lucie Roy	593	33.2

In the 2010 elections, the citizens of Morinville elected one mayor, six councillors (all at large), and two of the Greater St. Albert Catholic (Public) Schools' seven trustees.

==== By-election ====
Morinville by-election
Councillor
Candidate	Votes	%
**Sheldon Fingler**	**263**	**35.8**
Kevin Wedick	231	31.5
Jim O'Brien	114	15.5
Joseph Trapani	60	8.2
Jackie Luker-Chevalier	56	7.6
Bonnie Moerike	10	1.4

After Councillor Ben Van DeWalle left council, a by-election was scheduled for August 23, 2012, to fill the empty seat.

=== Okotoks ===
Town of Okotoks
Mayor			Councillors					
Candidate	Votes	%	Candidate	Votes	%	Candidate	Votes	%
**Bill Robertson**	**2,942**	**52.7**	**Edward Sands**	**2,254**	**40.4**	Reg Gothard	1,134	20.3
Beth Kish	2,641	47.3	**Matt Rockley**	**2,192**	**39.3**	Naydene Lewis	1,089	19.5
			**Stephen Clark**	**1,619**	**29.0**	Nicole Watkins	1,076	19.3
			**Laurie Hodson**	**1,434**	**25.7**	Shelley Taylor	1,005	18.0
			**Florence Christophers**	**1,398**	**25.0**	Ben Crook	970	17.4
			**Ray Watrin**	**1,383**	**24.8**	Greg Bell	705	12.6
			Karen Neal	1,373	24.6	Michael Douglas Moore	663	11.9
			Ralph Wilson	1,325	23.7	Gary Loughery	639	11.4
			David Clark	1,316	23.6	Aaron Lawson	459	8.2
			Allen Jenkins	1,292	23.1	Gordon Jason Davis	390	7.0
			Carrie Fischer	1,280	22.9	Derek Lovlin	346	6.2
			Ken Heemeryck	1,219	21.8	Jim Snell	285	5.1
			Scott Garner	1,211	21.7	C.J. Hannis-Burrows	96	1.7

In the 2010 elections, the citizens of Okotoks elected one mayor, six councillors (all at large), and one of the Foothills School Division No. 38's five trustees, and participated in electing one of the Christ the Redeemer Catholic Separate Regional Division No. 3's eight trustees.

=== Stony Plain ===
Town of Stony Plain
Mayor			Councillors		
Candidate	Votes	%	Candidate	Votes	%
**Ken Lemke**	**Acclaimed**		**William Choy**	**2,139**	**82.7**
			**Darren Badry**	**1,903**	**73.5**
			**Judy Bennett**	**1,472**	**56.9**
			**Dwight Ganske**	**1,434**	**55.4**
			**Robert Twerdoclib**	**1,425**	**55.1**
			**Pat Hansard**	**1,165**	**45.0**
			Shirley Akins	1,026	39.6
			Harold Pawlechko	989	38.2
			Donald Butlin	862	33.3

In the 2010 elections, the citizens of Stony Plain elected six councillors (at large), and participated in electing one of the Parkland School Division No. 70's seven trustees and two of the Evergreen Catholic Separate Regional Division No. 2's eight trustees. The incumbent mayor was unchallenged.

==== By-election ====
Stony Plain by-election
Mayor			Councillor		
Candidate	Votes	%	Candidate	Votes	%
**William Choy**	**1,531**	**68.1%**	**Bruce Lloy**	**937**	**64.4%**
Paul McCann	717	31.9	Curtis Grant	518	35.6%
			Harold Pawlechko	475	32.6%
			Donald Butlin	286	19.7%

After it was announced that Mayor Ken Lemke, would be leaving council, a by-election was scheduled for May 1, 2012, to fill the empty seat. Incumbent Councillor William Choy also resigned, and ran for mayor successfully.

=== Strathmore ===
Town of Strathmore
Mayor			Councillors		
Candidate	Votes	%	Candidate	Votes	%
**Steve Grajczyk**	**941**	**28.9**	**Pat Fule**	**2,136**	**65.5**
Michael Ell	736	22.6	**Rocky Blokland**	**1,764**	**54.1**
Brad Walls	718	22.0	**John Rempel**	**1,507**	**46.2**
Glenn Freeland	298	9.1	**David Hamilton**	**1,456**	**44.6**
Kevin Baldwin	292	9.0	**Bob Sobol**	**1,318**	**40.4**
George Lattery	276	8.5	**Earl Best**	**1,242**	**38.1**
			Kevin Keegan	1,239	38.0
			Lois Wegener	1,231	37.7
			Cheryl Payne	1,069	32.8
			Colina Clark	1,033	31.7
			Terry Peterson	753	23.1
			Bill Cooper	639	19.6
			John M. Whieldon	491	15.1

In the 2010 elections, the citizens of Strathmore elected one mayor, six councillors (all at large), and participated in electing two of the Golden Hills School Division No. 75's six trustees and one of the Christ the Redeemer Catholic Separate Regional Division No. 3's eight trustees.

=== Sylvan Lake ===
Town of Sylvan Lake
Mayor			Councillors		
Candidate	Votes	%	Candidate	Votes	%
**Susan Samson**	**1,196**	**51.0**	**Sean McIntyre**	**1,478**	**63.0**
Ted Iverson	584	24.9	**Graham Parsons**	**1,235**	**52.6**
Bryan Lambertson	566	24.1	**Laverne Asselstine**	**1,093**	**46.6**
			**Dale Plante**	**1,085**	**46.2**
			**Rick Grimson**	**976**	**41.6**
			**Ken MacVicar**	**966**	**41.2**
			Melinda Weibe	947	40.4
			Frank Peck	854	36.4
			Lynda Sills Fielder	780	33.2
			Wendy Sauvageau	769	32.8
			Patrick De Jonge	481	20.5
			Murray Bremner	365	15.6

In the 2010 elections, the citizens of Sylvan Lake elected one mayor and six councillors (all at large), and participated in electing one of the Chinook's Edge School Division No. 73's nine trustees.

=== Taber ===
Town of Taber
Mayor			Councillors	
Candidate	Votes	%	Candidate	Votes
**Ray Bryant**	**Acclaimed**		**Louie Tams**	**832**
			**Murray Rochelle**	**822**
			**Randy Sparks**	**809**
			**Garth Bekkering**	**780**
			**Rick Popadynetz**	**661**
			**John Papp**	**659**
			Terry Sargeant	639
			Mark Francis	542
			Chris Bernhardt	537
			Susan Stonehill	500
			Laura Ross Giroux	408

In the 2010 elections, the citizens of Taber elected six councillors (all at large), and participated in electing three of the Horizon School Division No. 67's seven trustees and one of the Holy Spirit Roman Catholic Separate Regional Division No. 4's nine trustees. The incumbent mayor was unchallenged.

=== Whitecourt ===
Town of Whitecourt
Mayor	Councillors
**Trevor Thain**	Darlene Chartrand
	Maryann Chichak
Norman Hodgson
Bill McAree
Derek Schlosser
Willard Strebchuk

In the 2010 elections, the citizens of Whitecourt participated in electing two of the Northern Gateway Regional Division No. 10's nine trustees, and two of the Living Waters Catholic Regional Division No. 42's six trustees. The citizens however did not elect a mayor and councillors as the lone mayoral candidate (the incumbent) and the six councillor candidates (five being incumbents) formed Whitecourt's 2010–2013 council by acclamation. A second mayoral candidate, who was the runner-up in the 2007 municipal election, withdrew from the race a day after nomination day, negating the requirement for the election.

== Specialized municipalities ==
The following are the election results for Alberta specialized municipalities with a population over 7,500, two of which include the urban service areas of Fort McMurray and Sherwood Park. Bold indicates elected, and incumbents are italicized.

=== Mackenzie County ===
Mackenzie County
Councillors
Ward 1			Ward 2			Ward 3		
Candidate	Votes	%	Candidate	Votes	%	Candidate	Votes	%
**Dicky Driedger**	**35**	**38.0**	**Bill Neufeld**	**Acclaimed**		**Peter F. Braun**	**321**	**68.7**
Joe Peters	33	35.9	Ward 4			Ron Dyck	146	31.3
Josh Knelsen	24	26.1	**John W. Dridger**	**Acclaimed**		Ward 5		
Ward 6			Ward 7			**Elmer Derksen**	**46**	**73.0**
**Eric Jorgensen**	**Acclaimed**		**Odell Flett**	**104**	**47.5**	Ed Froese	17	27.0
Ward 8			Ray Toews	86	39.3	Ward 9		
**Walter Sarapuk**	**98**	**73.1**	James Thompson	29	13.2	**Jacqueline Dawn Bateman**	**61**	**61.6**
Richard Marshall	36	26.9	Ward 10			Beth Kappelar	38	38.4
			**Lisa Wardley**	**Acclaimed**				

In the 2010 elections, the citizens of Mackenzie County elected six of their ten councillors (one from each of ten wards), and the eight Fort Vermilion School Division No. 52's trustees. Four of the council candidates, three being incumbents, were unchallenged. Council appointed Ward 2 Councillor Bill Neufeld the County Reeve.

=== Strathcona County ===
In the 2010 elections, the citizens of Strathcona County elected one mayor, five of the eight councillors (one from each of eight wards), four of the Elk Island Public Schools Regional Division No. 14's nine trustees (3 from Sherwood Park, and 1 from Strathcona County north), and four of the Elk Island Catholic Separate Regional Division No. 41's seven trustees (supporters in Sherwood Park). After Ward 5 Councillor Jacquie Fenske left council, a by-election was scheduled for June 25, 2012, to fill the empty seat.

=== Wood Buffalo ===
In the 2010 elections, the citizens of the Regional Municipality of Wood Buffalo elected one mayor, eight of their ten councillors (from four wards), the five Fort McMurray Public School District trustees (in Fort McMurray), three of the Northland School Division No. 61's 23 school boards (outside Fort McMurray, three or five trustees each), and the five Fort McMurray Roman Catholic Separate School District No. 32 trustees (in Fort McMurray). After two Ward 1 Councillors left council, a by-election was scheduled for June 25, 2012, to fill the empty seats.

== Municipal districts ==
The following are the election results for Alberta municipal districts (counties) with a population over 7,500. Bold indicates elected, and incumbents are italicized.

=== Athabasca County ===
Athabasca County
Councillors
Division 1			Division 2			Division 3		
Candidate	Votes	%	Candidate	Votes	%	Candidate	Votes	%
**Allen Balay**	**166**	**57.2**	**Denis Willcott**	**166**	**58.5**	**Doris Splane**	**174**	**49.3**
Victor Cumbleton	124	42.8	Charlie Ashbey	118	41.5	Wes Kowalchuk	168	47.6
						Wayne Plamondon	11	3.1
Division 4			Division 5			Division 6		
**Christine Bilsky**	**214**	**65.2**	**Kevin Haines**	**252**	**68.9**	**Jack Dowhaluk**	**190**	**68.6**
Brian Bahry	114	34.8	Wendy Jewell	114	31.1	Jennifer Batiuk	87	31.4
Division 7			Division 8			Division 9		
**David Yurdiga**	**Acclaimed**		**Larry Armfelt**	**197**	**50.1**	**Michael Demko**	**167**	**58.4**
			Colleen Loziak	196	49.9	Larry Manysiak	119	41.6

In the 2010 elections, the citizens of Athabasca County elected eight of the nine councillors (one from each of nine divisions) and five of the Aspen View Regional Division No. 19's nine trustees. One incumbent councillor was unchallenged. Council appointed the Division 7 Councillor David Yurdiga the County Reeve.

=== M.D. of Bonnyville ===
M.D. of Bonnyville No. 87
		Councillors					
Reeve		Ward 1			Ward 2		
**Ed Rondeau**	**Acclaimed**	**Donald Sinclair**	**Acclaimed**		**David Fox**	**Acclaimed**	
		Ward 3			Ward 4		
		Candidate	Votes	%	Candidate	Votes	%
		**Mike Krywiak**	**Acclaimed**		**Barry Kalinski**	**300**	**56.1**
					Marcy MacEachern	235	43.9
		Ward 5			Ward 6		
		**Glen Johnson**	**196**	**42.0**	**Fred Bamber**	**246**	**48.2**
		Andy Wakaruk	178	38.1	Paul Gullackson	124	24.3
		James Sevenson	93	19.9	Bob Engleder	70	13.7
					Delano Tolley	70	13.7

In the 2010 elections, the citizens of the Municipal District of Bonnyville No. 87 elected three of the six councillors (one from each of six wards), and three of the Northern Lights School Division No. 69's nine trustees (as Ward 1), and participated in electing three of the Lakeland Roman Catholic Separate School District No. 150's seven trustees (supporters near Bonnyville). The incumbent reeve and three of the incumbent councillors were unchallenged.

=== Camrose County ===
Camrose County
Councillors
Division 1			Division 2			Division 3		
**Robert D. Bjorge**	**Acclaimed**		**Glen Karl Nelson**	**Acclaimed**		**Don L. Gregorwich**	**Acclaimed**	
Division 4			Division 5			Division 6		
Candidate	Votes	%	Candidate	Votes	%	Candidate	Votes	%
**Trevor Miller**	**267**	**89.6**	**Brian Austrom**	**121**	**51.9**	**Vern Peterson**	**197**	**59.5**
Dan Olofson	31	10.4	Harvey Benke	112	48.1	Gregory Gillespie	134	40.5
Division 7
**Doug Lyseng**	**Acclaimed**							

In the 2010 elections, the citizens of Camrose County elected three of the seven councillors (one from each of seven divisions) and two of the Battle River Regional Division No. 31's eight trustees (as Ward Camrose County), and participated in electing one of the Elk Island Catholic Separate Regional Division No. 41's seven trustees (supporters near Camrose). Four of the council candidates, three being incumbents, were unchallenged. Council appointed the Division 3 Councillor Don Gregorwich the County Reeve.

=== Clearwater County ===
Clearwater County
Councillors
Division 1			Division 2			Division 3		
Candidate	Votes	%	Candidate	Votes	%	Candidate	Votes	%
**James "Jim" Duncan**	**212**	**53.1**	**Dick Wymenga**	**Acclaimed**		**Case Korver**	**Acclaimed**	
Ken Qually	187	46.9	Division 4			Division 5		
			**John Vandermeer**	**190**	**51.1**	**Bob Bryant**	**246**	**62.9**
			Krista Waters	116	31.2	Andy Smith	145	37.1
Division 6			Millie Boake	66	17.7	Division 7		
**Earl Graham**	**271**	**65.5**				**Pat Alexander**	**170**	**75.2**
Wilf Tricker	143	34.5				Dennis Oelhaupl	56	24.8

In the 2010 elections, the citizens of Clearwater County elected five of the seven councillors (one from each of seven divisions) and two of the Wild Rose School Division No. 66's six trustees (one from each of Wards 3 & 4). Two of the council candidates, one being an incumbent, were unchallenged. Council appointed the Division 7 Councillor Pat Alexander the County Reeve.

=== M.D. of Foothills ===
M.D. of Foothills
Councillors
Division 1			Division 2			Division 3	
Candidate	Votes	%	Candidate	Votes	%	Candidate	Vote
**Ralph C. Nelson**	**Acclaimed**		**Doug Longson**	**189**	**35.0**	**Barbara Castell**	**Acclaimed**
Division 4			Delilah Miller	182	33.7	Division 5	
**Suzanne Oel**	**382**	**54.8**	Jackie Lacey	169	31.3	**Ron Chase**	**Acclaimed**
Gwen Blatz	315	45.2	Division 6			Division 7	
			**Larry Spilak**	**Acclaimed**		**Ted Mills**	**Acclaimed**

In the 2010 elections, the citizens of the Municipal District of Foothills No. 31 elected two of the seven councillors (one from each of seven divisions) and three of the Foothills School Division No. 38's five trustees (one from each of Wards 1, 2, & 3), and participated in electing two of the Christ the Redeemer Catholic Separate Regional Division No. 3's eight trustees (supporters near High River & Okotoks). Four of the incumbent councillors were unchallenged. Council appointed the Division 6 Councillor Larry Spilak the District Reeve.

=== County of Grande Prairie ===
County of Grande Prairie No. 1
Councillors
Division 1			Division 2			Division 3		
Candidate	Votes	%	Candidate	Votes	%	Candidate	Votes	%
**Everett McDonald**	**Acclaimed**		**Sharon Lynne Nelson**	**306**	**57.0**	**Leanne Beaupre**	**Acclaimed**	
Division 4			Kurt Balderston	231	43.0			
**Ross "Sam" Sutherland**	**286**	**53.3**	Division 5			Division 6		
Jack O'Toole	251	46.7	**Patricia "Pat" Jacobs**	**Acclaimed**		**Lois Dueck**	**Acclaimed**	
Division 7			Division 8			Division 9		
**Brock Smith**	**Acclaimed**		**Richard Harpe**	**Acclaimed**		**Mary Ann Eckstrom**	**257**	**53.0**
						Bob Chrenek	228	47.0

In the 2010 elections, the citizens of the County of Grande Prairie No. 1 elected three of the nine councillors (one from each of nine divisions) and five of the Peace Wapiti School Division No. 76's nine trustees (one from each of Wards 3, 4, 5, 6, & 7), and participated in electing six of the Grande Prairie Roman Catholic Separate School District No. 28's seven trustees (supporters near Beaverlodge, Grande Prairie, & Sexsmith). Six of the council candidates, five being incumbents, were unchallenged. Council appointed the Division 1 Councillor Everett McDonald the County Reeve.

==== By-election ====
County of Grande Prairie No. 1 by-election
Councillor
Division 1
Candidate	Votes	%
**Harold Bulford**	**237**	**60.0**
Alvin McEwen	60	15.2
DJ Golden	58	14.7
Andrew Muise	26	6.6
Greg Moody	14	3.5

After Division 1 Councillor, and Reeve, Everett McDonald left council, a by-election was scheduled for June 11, 2012, to fill the empty seat. Council appointed the Division 3 Councillor Leanne Beaupre the County Reeve.

=== Lac La Biche County ===
Lac La Biche County
			Councillors					
Mayor			Ward 1			Ward 2		
Candidate	Votes	%	Candidate	Votes	%	Candidate	Votes	%
**Peter Kirylchuck**	**1,563**	**48.6**	**Alvin A. Kumpula**	**123**	**39.8**	**Aurel Langevin**	**244**	**54.0**
Thomas L. Lett	1,024	31.8	Roger Harbord	101	32.7	David Lozinski	208	46.0
Duane Young	629	19.6	Philip "Phil" Lane	85	27.5			
			Ward 3			Ward 4		
			**Guy Piquette**	**184**	**51.5**	**Eugene Uganecz**	**209**	**57.9**
			Greg Bochkarev	173	48.5	Alex Broadbent	152	42.1
			Ward 5			Ward 6		
			**Mary Jane "M.J." Siebold**	**198**	**44.1**	**Tim Thompson**	**205**	**61.4**
			Terry Colosimo	135	30.1	Heather Stromquist	129	38.6
			William "Bill" Abougoush	61	13.6	Ward 7		
			Darryl Montgomery	55	12.2	**Gail Broadbent**	**425**	**51.0**
						**John Nowak**	**350**	**42.0**
						Cecilia Quist	296	35.5
						Gordon Coutney	255	30.6
						Ralph Whitford	186	22.3
						Jacqueline Pirnak Marchak	155	18.6

In the 2010 elections, the citizens of Lac La Biche County elected one mayor, eight councillors (one from each of Wards 1–6, & two from Ward 7), and three of the Northern Lights School Division No. 69's nine trustees (one from each of Wards 3, 4, & 5).

==== By-election ====
Lac La Biche County by-election
			Councillor	
Mayor			Ward 2	
Candidate	Votes	%	Candidate	Votes
**Aurel Langevin**	**824**	**49.1**	**Robert Richard**	**Acclaimed**
Thomas Lett	718	42.8		
Ray Ewaskiw	135	8.1		

After it was announced that Mayor Peter Kirylchuck, would be leaving council, a by-election was scheduled for September 5, 2012, to fill the empty seat. Incumbent Councillor Aurel Langevin also resigned, and ran for mayor successfully.

=== Lac Ste. Anne County ===
Lac Ste. Anne County
Councillors
Division 1	Division 2	Division 3
**Lorne Olsvik**	**Robert Clark**	**Wayne Borle**
Division 4	Division 5	Division 6
**Dwight Davidson**	**Robert Kohn**	**Ron Kidd**
Division 7
**Lloyd Giebelhaus**

In the 2010 elections, the citizens of Lac Ste. Anne County elected the County Council, which consists of seven councillors (one from each of seven divisions), and three of the Northern Gateway Regional Division No. 10's nine trustees (one from each of Wards Mayerthorpe, Onoway, & Sangudo). Council appointed the Division 7 Councillor Lloyd Giebelhaus the County Reeve.

=== Lacombe County ===
Lacombe County
Councillors
Division 1			Division 2			Division 3		
Candidate	Votes	%	Candidate	Votes	%	Candidate	Votes	%
**Rod McDermand**	**163**	**52.6**	**Brenda Knight**	**213**	**36.6**	**Doug Sproule**	**196**	**48.4**
Hunter Warford	147	47.4	Tony Jeglum	190	32.6	Cliff Soper	184	45.4
			Wes Shackleton	179	30.8	Lewis Cuthbertson	25	6.2
Division 4			Division 5			Division 6		
**Paula Law**	**180**	**54.9**	**Kenneth Wigmore**	**206**	**82.7**	**Keith LeRoy Stephenson**	**Acclaimed**	
Martin Sherrer	61	18.6	Kelly McCullough	43	17.3	Division 7		
June Lundie	51	15.5				**Dana Kreil**	**145**	**56.0**
Cheryl Smythe	36	11.0				Keith Pregoda	114	44.0

In the 2010 elections, the citizens of Lacombe County elected six of the seven councillors (one from each of seven divisions) and three of the Wolf Creek School Division No. 72's six trustees (from Wards 4 & 5), and participated in electing one Wolf Creek trustee from Ward 1, and one of the St. Thomas Aquinas Roman Catholic Separate Regional Division No. 38's nine trustees (supporters near Lacombe). After winning a tie breaker draw the previous election, the Division 6 incumbent was unchallenged. Council appointed the Division 5 Councillor Ken Wigmore the County Reeve.

==== By-election ====
After Division 3 Councillor Doug Sproule died, a by-election was held on June 6, 2011, to fill the empty seat, Cliff Soper, who placed a close second in 2010, won.

=== Leduc County ===
Leduc County
Councillors
Division 1			Division 2			Division 3		
Candidate	Votes	%	Candidate	Votes	%	Candidate	Votes	%
**Jocelyn Mackay**	**274**	**39.8**	**Clayton Stumph**	**412**	**60.3**	**John Schonewille**	**228**	**38.8**
Roy Eckert	264	38.4	Marvin Molzan	271	39.7	Mary-Ann McDonald	204	34.8
Dennis Litke	150	21.8	Division 4			Dellia Tardif	155	26.4
			**John Whaley**	**Acclaimed**		Division 5		
Division 6			Division 7			**Betty Anne Glassman**	**Acclaimed**	
**Ruth Harrison**	**256**	**56.3**	**Audrey Kelto**	**278**	**56.4**			
Shawna Dennis	174	38.2	Donald Mosicki	124	25.2			
Thomas Cliff	25	5.5	Vernon Muth	91	18.5			

In the 2010 elections, the citizens of Leduc County elected five of the seven councillors (one from each of seven divisions) and three of the Black Gold Regional Schools' seven trustees (one from each of Wards County West, Central, & East), and participated in electing three of the St. Thomas Aquinas Roman Catholic Separate Regional Division No. 38's nine trustees (supporters near Beaumont & Leduc) and one of the Evergreen Catholic Separate Regional Division No. 2's eight trustees (supporters near Devon). Two of the incumbent councillors were unchallenged. Council appointed the Division 4 Councillor John Whaley the Mayor.

=== County of Lethbridge ===
County of Lethbridge
Councillors
Division 1			Division 2			Division 3	
Candidate	Votes	%	Candidate	Votes	%	Candidate	Vote
**Lorne Hickey**	**155**	**53.3**	**John Willms**	**Acclaimed**		**Henry Doeve**	**Accalaimed**
Floyd Joss	136	46.7					
Division 4			Division 5			Division 6	
**Ken Benson**	**139**	**53.1**	**Steve Campbell**	**144**	**55.4**	**Tom White**	**Accalaimed**
Bonnie Cote	123	46.9	Kevin Wobick	87	33.5	Division 7	
			Sheldon Albrecht	29	11.2	**Morris Zeinstra**	**Accalaimed**

In the 2010 elections, the citizens of the County of Lethbridge elected three of the seven councillors (one from each of seven divisions) and five of the Palliser Regional Division No. 26's six trustees (one from each of five divisions), and participated in electing seven of the Holy Spirit Roman Catholic Separate Regional Division No. 4's nine trustees (supporters near Coaldale, Lethbridge, & Picture Butte). Four of the incumbent councillors were unchallenged, in divisions 2 and 3 this was the second time in a row. Council appointed the Division 1 Councillor Lorne Hickey the County Reeve.

=== Mountain View County ===
Mountain View County
Councillors
Division 1			Division 2			Division 3		
Candidate	Votes	%	Candidate	Votes	%	Candidate	Votes	%
**Kevin Good**	**341**	**60.0**	**Patricia McKean**	**351**	**63.6**	**Duncan Milne**	**343**	**77.3**
Gwen Day	227	40.0	Lana Yakimchuk	201	36.4	Everett Page	101	22.7
Division 4			Division 5			Division 6		
**Bruce Beattie**	**268**	**56.1**	**Robert Orr**	**230**	**43.8**	**Paddy Munro**	**342**	**51.6**
Kathy Blain	210	43.9	Verna McFadden	175	33.3	Ken Heck	221	33.3
Division 7			Linda Burrell	120	22.9	Bob Nerrie	45	6.8
**Albert "Al" Kemmere**	**218**	**53.4**				Hans Ullmann	36	5.4
Mike Radford	190	46.6				William Davies	19	2.9

In the 2010 elections, the citizens of Mountain View County elected seven councillors (one from each of seven divisions) and four of the Chinook's Edge School Division No. 73's nine trustees (one from each of Wards 6, 7, 8, & 9). Council appointed the Division 6 Councillor Paddy Munro the County Reeve.

=== Parkland County ===
Parkland County
			Councillors					
Mayor			Division 1			Division 2		
Candidate	Votes	%	Candidate	Votes	%	Candidate	Votes	%
**Rodney Shaigec**	**2,982**	**50.3**	**Jo Szady**	**788**	**58.3**	**Dianne Allen**	**526**	**54.6**
Rob Weideman	2,944	49.7	Patrick A. Doyle	323	23.9	Jackie McCuaig	437	45.4
			Sonia Kochansky	145	10.7	Division 3		
			Derek Prue	95	7.0	**Phyllis Kobasiuk**	**755**	**57.0**
			Division 4			Clifford Roy Goerz	570	43.0
			**Darrell Hollands**	**Acclaimed**				
			Division 5			Division 6		
			**Denise Locher**	**545**	**54.1**	**Tracey Melnyk**	**Acclaimed**	
			Ken Darby	462	45.9			

In the 2010 elections, the citizens of Parkland County elected one mayor, four of the six councillors (one from each of six divisions), and four of the Parkland School Division No. 70's six trustees (one from each of Wards 1, 2, 4, & 6), and participated in electing five of the Evergreen Catholic Separate Regional Division No. 2's eight trustees (supporters near Spruce Grove & Stony Plain). Two of the incumbent councillors were unchallenged.

=== Ponoka County ===
Ponoka County
Councillors
Division 1	Division 2	Division 3
**Gordon Svenningsen**	**Gawney Hinkley**	**George Verheire**
Division 4	Division 5	
**Keith Beebe**	**Paul McLauchlin**	

In the 2010 elections, the citizens of Ponoka County elected the County Council, which consists of five councillors (one from each of five divisions), and participated in electing two of the Wolf Creek School Division No. 72's six trustees (from Wards 2 & 3) and one of the St. Thomas Aquinas Roman Catholic Separate Regional Division No. 38's nine trustees (supporters near Ponoka). Council appointed the Division 1 Councillor Gordon Svenningsen the County Reeve for one year.

=== Red Deer County ===
Red Deer County
			Councillors					
Mayor			Division 1			Division 2		
Candidate	Votes	%	Candidate	Votes	%	Candidate	Votes	%
**Jim Wood**	**2,116**	**47.3**	**Philip Massier**	**390**	**40.0**	**Don Nesbitt**	**234**	**35.0**
Stan Bell	1,217	27.2	John Perry	341	35.0	Wade Martens	220	32.9
Debra Hanna	1,145	25.6	Philip Reay	244	25.0	Donel Bryck	169	25.3
			Division 3			Jean Bota-Kuntz	46	6.9
			**Penny Archibald**	**362**	**62.2**	Division 4		
			Doug Malsbury	220	37.8	**David Hoar**	**528**	**66.2**
			Division 5			Bruce Stigings	270	33.8
			**Richard Lorenz**	**343**	**33.7**	Division 6		
			Rod English	340	33.4	**George Gehrke**	**249**	**57.4**
			Jim Lougheed	336	33.0	Gea Phagoo	185	42.6

In the 2010 elections, the citizens of Red Deer County elected one mayor, six councillors (one from each of six divisions), and five of the Chinook's Edge School Division's nine trustees (one from each of Wards 1, 2, 3, 4, & 5).

=== Rocky View County ===
Rocky View County
Councillors
Division 1			Division 2			Division 3		
Candidate	Votes	%	Candidate	Votes	%	Candidate	Votes	%
**Rick Butler**	**464**	**57.4**	**Kim Magnuson**	**513**	**69.3**	**Margaret Bahcheli**	**490**	**44.6**
Bob Everett	344	42.6	Herb Coburn	227	30.7	Christine Pennell	441	40.1
Division 4			Division 5			Breanna Sikorski	134	12.2
**Roland "Rolly" Ashdown**	**832**	**65.3**	**Earl Solberg**	**415**	**52.3**	Jay Sarhan	34	3.1
Jim Rheubottom	442	34.7	Jerry Gautreau	379	47.7	Division 6		
Division 7			Division 8			**Greg Boehlke**	**348**	**61.1**
**Lois Habberfield**	**Acclaimed**		**Alan David Sacuta**	**738**	**50.2**	John McMurray	222	38.9
Division 9			Hopeton Louden	508	34.5			
**Paul Douglas McLean**	**517**	**51.9**	Gerry Neustaedter	225	15.3			
Norman Kent	232	23.3						
Enrique Massot	209	21.0						
Mary Ann Mears	38	3.8						

In the 2010 elections, the citizens of Rocky View County elected eight of the nine councillors (one from each of nine divisions) and five of the Rocky View School Division's seven trustees (one from each of Wards 1, 2, 4, 5, & 6), and participated in electing three of the Calgary Catholic School District's seven trustees (supporters near Airdrie, Chestermere, & Cochrane). For the second time in a row, the incumbent Division 7 councillor was unchallenged. Council appointed the Division 4 Councillor Ronald Ashdown the County Reeve.

==== By-election ====
Rocky View By-election
Councillor
Division 1
Candidate	Vote	%
**Liz Breakey**	**374**	**46.1**
David Rupert	323	39.8
Bob Everett	114	14.1

Division 1 Councillor Rick Butler died in December 2011, a by-election was scheduled for March 26, 2012, to fill the empty seat.

=== Sturgeon County ===
Sturgeon County
		Councillors								
Mayor		Division 1			Division 2			Division 3		
Candidate	Vote	Candidate	Votes	%	Candidate	Votes	%	Candidate	Votes	%
**Donald Rigney**	**Acclaimed**	**Donald McGeachy**	**Acclaimed**		**Tom Flynn**	**Acclaimed**		**Kenneth McGillis**	**479**	**82.0**
		Division 4			Division 5			Catlin Letendre	105	18.0
		**David Kluthe**	**347**	**50.5**	**Joe Milligan**	**364**	**53.7**	Division 6		
		Al Homeniuk	340	49.5	Wayne Bullock	314	46.3	**Karen Shaw**	**Acclaimed**	

In the 2010 elections, the citizens of Sturgeon County elected three of the six councillors (one from each of six divisions), and the seven Sturgeon School Division No. 24 trustees (one from each of seven wards). The incumbent mayor, and three incumbent councillors were unchallenged.

=== County of Vermilion River ===
County of Vermilion River
Councillors
Division 1			Division 2			Division 3		
Candidate	Votes	%	Candidate	Votes	%	Candidate	Votes	%
**Murray King**	**176**	**74.9**	**Daryl Watt**	**212**	**76.5**	**Richard Van Ee**	**Acclaimed**	
Don Malka	59	25.1	Peter Green	65	23.5			
Division 4			Division 5			Division 6		
**David "Dave" Gamracy**	**Acclaimed**		**Glenda Elkow**	**238**	**48.3**	**Edward Parke**	**168**	**76.4**
			Bob Nielsen	134	27.2	Pat Cusack	26	11.8
Division 7			Linda Ulan	62	12.6	Clinton Heathcote	26	11.8
**Brent Romanchuk**	**Acclaimed**		Lillian Prost	59	12.0			

In the 2010 elections, the citizens of the County of Vermilion River elected four of the seven councillors (one from each of seven divisions) and four of the Buffalo Trail Public Schools Regional Division No. 28's nine trustees (one from each of four divisions), and participated in electing two of the East Central Alberta Catholic Separate Schools Regional Division No. 16's eight trustees (supporters near Vermilion). Residents who live near Lloydminster, and send their children to city schools, cannot vote for their trustees, because of Lloydminster being on the Saskatchewan election schedule, and the Lloydminster Public School and Roman Catholic Separate School Divisions using the Saskatchewan curriculum. Three of the incumbent councillors were unchallenged. Council appointed the Division 3 Councillor Richard Van Ee the County Reeve.

=== County of Wetaskiwin ===
County of Wetaskiwin No. 10
Councillors
Division 1			Division 2			Division 3		
Candidate	Votes	%	Candidate	Votes	%	Candidate	Votes	%
**Brenda Shantz**	**133**	**36.9**	**Terry Van De Kraats**	**137**	**38.8**	**Garry Dearing**	**Acclaimed**	
Rod Harink	124	34.4	Kenneth Ball	126	35.7	Division 4		
Bill Angus	103	28.6	Wayne Maygard	90	25.5	**Wayne Meyers**	**Acclaimed**	
Division 5			Division 6			Division 7		
**Larry McKeever**	**332**	**66.8**	**Kathy Rooyakkers**	**296**	**55.6**	**Barry Dunn**	**223**	**39.3**
Gary Rode	165	33.2	Nancy Watson	208	39.1	Kathy Duffy	203	35.8
			Maryann Nomann	28	5.3	Thea Smith	75	13.2
						Mike Cooper	66	11.6

In the 2010 elections, the citizens of the County of Wetaskiwin No. 10 elected five of the seven councillors (one from each of seven divisions), and four of the Wetaskiwin Regional Division No. 11's eight trustees (one from each of Wards 1, 2, 3, & 4), and participated in electing two of the St. Thomas Aquinas Roman Catholic Separate Regional Division No. 38's nine trustees (supporters near Wetaskiwin). For the second time in a row, the incumbent Division 3 and 4 councillors were unchallenged. Council appointed the Division 3 Councillor Garry Dearing the County Reeve.

=== Wheatland County ===
Wheatland County
Councillors
Division 1		Division 2		Division 3	
Candidate	Vote	Candidate	Vote	Candidate	Vote
**Alice Booth**		**Ken Sauve**		**Don Vander Velde**	**Acclaimed**
Division 4		Division 5		Division 6	
**Berniece Bland**	**Acclaimed**	**Brenda Knight**		**Glenn Koester**	**Acclaimed**
Division 7
**Ben Armstrong**	**Acclaimed**				

In the 2010 elections, the citizens of Wheatland County elected three of the seven councillors (one from each of seven divisions) and three of the Golden Hills School Division No. 75's six trustees (two from Ward 4, & one from Ward 5), and participated in electing two of the Christ the Redeemer Catholic Separate Regional Division No. 3's eight trustees (supporters near Drumheller, Rosebud, & Strathmore). Four of the incumbent councillors were unchallenged. Council appointed the Division 7 Councillor Ben Armstrong the District Reeve for one year.

=== Yellowhead County ===
Yellowhead County
		Councillors					
Mayor		Division 1			Division 2		
Candidate	Vote	Candidate	Votes	%	Candidate	Votes	%
**Gerald Soroka**	**Acclaimed**	**Maxine Lappe**	**163**	**55.6**	**Ewald Kwirant**	**Acclaimed**	
		Sandra Cherniawsky	130	44.4			
		Division 3			Division 4		
		**Fred Priestley-Wright**	**156**	**44.7**	**Brandon DePee**	**Acclaimed**	
		Gary Brownlee	111	31.8	Division 5		
		Jay Lowe	82	23.5	**Shawn Brian Berry**	**94**	**52.5**
					Leona Pelke	85	47.5
		Division 6			Division 7		
		**David Allen Stevens**	**117**	**34.1**	**Ruth Martin Williams**	**133**	**65.5**
		Bill Velichko	107	31.2	Roxanne Scherger	70	34.5
		Pat Fossheim	99	28.9	Division 8		
		Hazel Shearer	13	3.8	**Lavone Olson**	**172**	**49.0**
		W. Ray Stewart	7	2.0	Deb Williams	127	36.2
					Carol Kihn	52	14.8

In the 2010 elections, the citizens of Yellowhead County elected six of the eight councillors (one from each of eight divisions), and five of the Grande Yellowhead Public School Division No. 77's seven trustees, and participated in electing one of the Evergreen Catholic Separate Regional Division No. 2's eight trustees (supporters near Hinton) and two of the Living Waters Catholic Regional Division No. 42's six trustees (supporters near Edson). The incumbent mayor and two of the council candidates, one being an incumbent, were unchallenged.

==== By-election ====
Yellowhead By-election
Councillor
Division 4
Candidate	Vote	%
**David Russell**	**64**	**31.4**
Eugene Miluch	57	27.9
Sherry Richter	44	21.6
Tracy L. Boen	34	16.7
Rebeccah Kuhne	5	2.5

After it was announced that Division 4 Councillor Brandon DePee, would be leaving council, a by-election was scheduled for February 27, 2012, to fill the empty seat.

== See also ==
- Canadian electoral calendar, 2010
- Municipal elections in Canada
