= Northern Gateway =

Northern Gateway can refer to:

- Enbridge Northern Gateway Pipelines, a Canadian pipeline project
- Northern Gateway Regional Division No. 10, a school board in Alberta.
- Auckland Northern Motorway, a New Zealand toll road
- The Northern Gateway, an antebellum trade route connecting the Midwestern and Atlantic United States
- Northern Gateway Roundabout, a roundabout in Kingston upon Hull

The gateway to the north can refer to

- Edmonton, Alberta
- The Pas, Manitoba
- Prince Albert, Saskatchewan
