= 2007 Alberta municipal elections =

- October 15, 2007
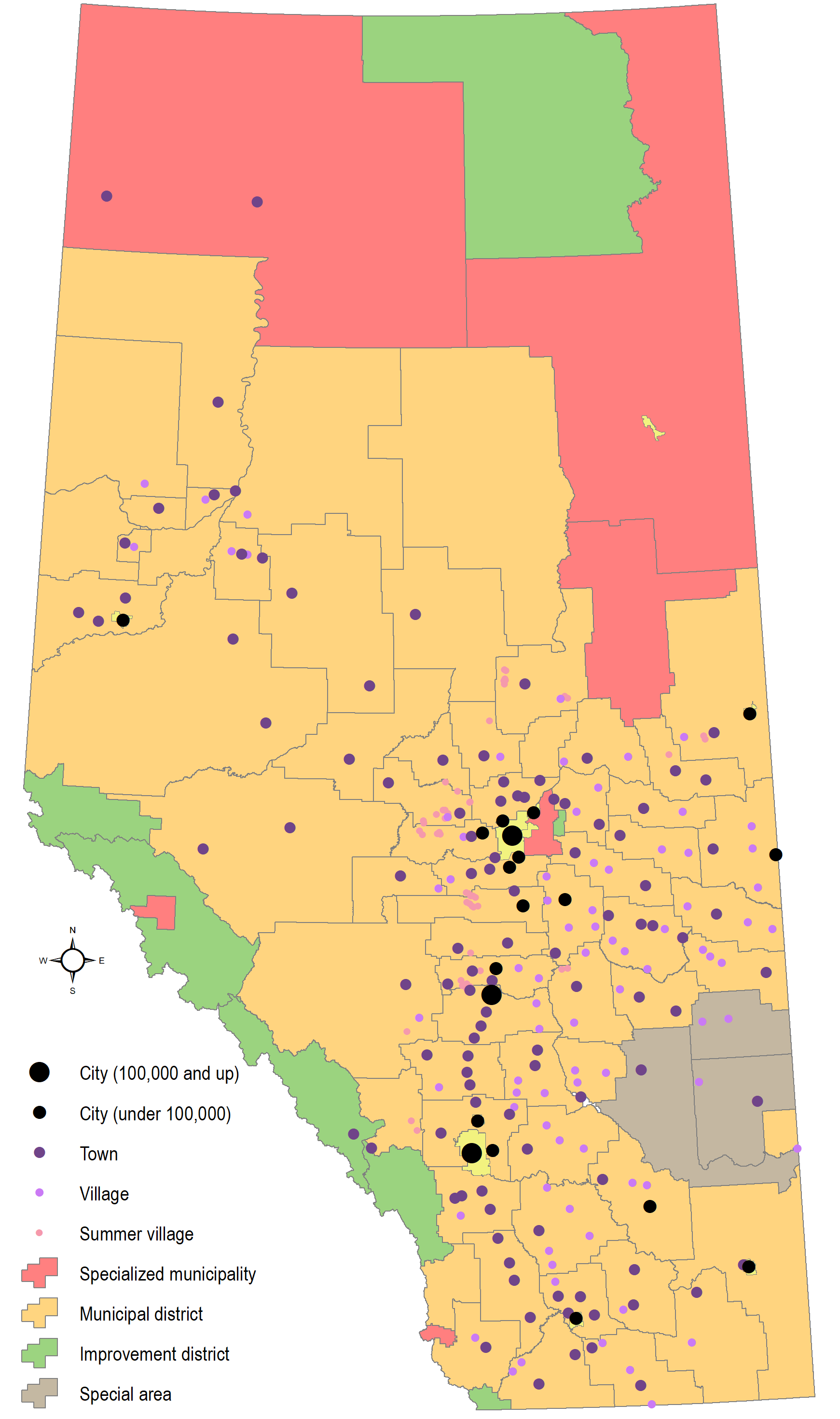
- Alberta's 344 municipalities (19 cities, 106 towns, 80 villages, 51 summer villages, 6 specialized municipalities, 63 municipal districts, 7 improvement districts, and 3 special areas) as of July 2021

Municipal elections were held in Alberta, Canada on Monday, October 15, 2007. Since 1968, provincial legislation has required every municipality to hold triennial elections. Mayors (reeves), councillors (aldermen), and trustees were elected to office in 15 of the 16 cities, all 111 towns, all 99 villages, all 4 specialized municipalities, all 64 municipal districts, 3 of the 7 improvement districts, and the advisory councils of the 3 special areas. The City of Lloydminster is on the Saskatchewan schedule (every three years), and held elections on October 25, 2006 and October 28, 2009, while 4 improvement districts (Nos. 12, 13, 24, and 25) have no councils and are led solely by the Minister of Municipal Affairs. Since the 2004 municipal elections, the Town of Lac La Biche and Lakeland County amalgamated to form Lac La Biche County, the villages of Irricana and Onoway became towns, the Town of Brooks became a city, and the Village of Sangudo was dissolved.

The 2007 municipal elections featured a plebiscite on the possible amalgamation of the towns of Black Diamond and Turner Valley.

== Cities ==
Bold indicates elected, and incumbents are italicized.

=== Airdrie ===
City of Airdrie
Mayor			Aldermen		
Candidate	Votes	%	Candidate	Votes	%
**Linda Bruce**	**Acclaimed**		**Shawn Howard**	**1,851**	**14.43%**
			**Marlene Weaver**	**1,688**	**13.16%**
			**Kelly Hegg**	**1,677**	**13.07%**
			**Glenda Alexander**	**1,662**	**12.96%**
			**Fred Burley**	**1,624**	**12.66%**
			**Richard Siemens**	**1,618**	**12.61%**
			Milton Friesen	1,012	7.89%
			Taylor Farthing	908	7.08%
			Trevor D. Grieve	788	6.14%

In the 2007 elections, the citizens of Airdrie elected six aldermen (at large), and participated in electing two of the Rocky View School Division's seven trustees (West Airdrie being Ward 7, & East Airdrie being part of Ward 3). All six incumbent aldermen were re-elected, the incumbent mayor had no challengers, and the Calgary Catholic School District's Ward 3/5 incumbent trustee had no challengers.

=== Brooks ===
City of Brooks
Mayor			Councillors		
Candidate	Votes	%	Candidate	Votes	%
**Martin Shields**	**1,527**	**57.3%**	**Rolf Bander**		
Carol Secondiak	1,137	42.7%	**Norm Gerestein**		
			**Clayton Johnson**		
			**Noel Moriyama**		
			**Kimberley Sharkey**		
			**Bill Pretice**		
Kerry Crapo
Michael Glynn Macdonald
Martin Shields
Pat Walsh

In the 2007 elections, the citizens of Brooks elected one mayor and six councillors (all at large), and participated in electing some of the Grasslands Regional Division No. 6's six trustees, and one of the Christ the Redeemer Catholic Separate Regional Division No. 3's eight trustees. The incumbent mayor Don Weisbeck, did not run.

=== Calgary ===
In the 2007 elections, the citizens of Calgary elected one mayor, 12 of their 14 aldermen (one from each of 14 wards), five of the seven Calgary School District trustees (each representing 2 of 14 wards), and three of the seven Calgary Catholic School District trustees (each representing 2 of 14 wards). Two incumbent councillors were unchallenged, two incumbent public school trustees were unchallenged, and four separate school trustee candidates (three being incumbents) were unchallenged.

=== Camrose ===
City of Camrose
Mayor			Councillors		
Candidate	Votes	%	Candidate	Votes	%
**Clarence Mastel**	**Acclaimed**		**Gerry Galenza**		
			**John Howard**		
			**Max Lindstrand**		
			**Ray McIsaac**		
			**Ina Nielsen**		
			**Kevin Pratt**		
			**Daryl Shillington**		
			**Wayne Throndson**		
Mary Durand
Wynn McLean

In the 2007 elections, the citizens of Camrose elected eight councillors (at large), two of the Battle River Regional Division No. 31's eight trustees (as Ward Camrose), and one of the Elk Island Catholic Separate Regional Division No. 41's seven trustees (as Ward Camrose). The incumbent mayor had no challengers.

=== Cold Lake ===
City of Cold Lake
Mayor			Councillors		
Candidate	Votes	%	Candidate	Votes	%
**Craig Copeland**	**1,402**	**57.1%**	**Kelvin Plain**	**1,952**	**18.19%**
Peter Urlacher	808	32.9%	**Bob Buckle**	**1,726**	**16.08%**
Jerry Kolewaski	244	9.9%	**Debra Pelechosky**	**1,580**	**14.72%**
			**Duane Lay**	**1,540**	**14.34%**
			**Hubert F. Rodden**	**1,374**	**12.80%**
			**Jean-Yves Taschereau**	**1,353**	**12.61%**
			Carlene Belcourt	1,208	11.26%

In the 2007 elections, the citizens of Cold Lake elected one mayor, six councillors (all at large), three of the Northern Lights School Division No. 69's eight trustees (as Ward 2), and three of the Lakeland Roman Catholic Separate School District No. 150's seven trustees (as Ward Cold Lake). The incumbent mayor Allan Buck, did not run.

=== Edmonton ===
In the 2007 elections, the citizens of Edmonton elected one mayor, 12 councillors (two from each of six wards), eight of the nine Edmonton Public Schools trustees (one from each of nine wards), and four of the seven Edmonton Catholic School District trustees (one from each of six wards, plus the runner-up). One incumbent public school trustee had no challengers, and three separate school trustee candidates (one being an incumbent) were unchallenged.

=== Fort Saskatchewan ===
City of Fort Saskatchewan
Mayor			Councillors		
Candidate	Votes	%	Candidate	Votes	%
**Jim Sheasgreen**	**Acclaimed**		**Ed Van Delden**	**≥1,352**	**≥8.60%**
			**Stew Hennig**	**≥1,352**	**≥8.60%**
			**Tom Hutchison**	**≥1,352**	**≥8.60%**
			**Howard Johnson**	**≥1,352**	**≥8.60%**
			**Gale Katchur**	**≥1,352**	**≥8.60%**
			**Don Westman**	**≥1,352**	**≥8.60%**
			[Candidate 7]	≥1,344	≥8.50%
			Kristie Phelan	1,337	8.50%
			Judy Duncan	1,323	8.41%

In the 2007 elections, the citizens of Fort Saskatchewan elected six councillors (at large), two of the Elk Island Public Schools Regional Division No. 14's nine trustees (as Ward Fort Saskatchewan), and one of the Elk Island Catholic Separate Regional Division No. 41's seven trustees (as Ward Fort Saskatchewan). The incumbent mayor had no challengers.

=== Grande Prairie ===
In the 2007 elections, the citizens of Grande Prairie elected one mayor, eight aldermen (all at large), the five Grande Prairie School District No. 2357 trustees (at large), and five of the Grande Prairie Roman Catholic Separate School District No. 28's seven trustees (as Ward 1).

=== Leduc ===
City of Leduc
Mayor			Aldermen		
Candidate	Votes	%	Candidate	Votes	%
**Greg Krischke**	**2,870**	**71.9%**	**Dana L. Smith**	**2,230**	**11.10%**
James K. Black	1,119	28.1%	**David Mackenzie**	**2,135**	**10.63%**
			**Dominic Mishio**	**2,123**	**10.57%**
			**Bob Young**	**2,116**	**10.53%**
			**Terry Lazowski**	**2,024**	**10.08%**
			**Judy Archie**	**1,829**	**9.10%**
			Terry Atkinson	1,660	8.26%
			Bob Thompson	1,512	7.53%
			Russ Luke	1,282	6.38%
			Brian Calhoun	1,267	6.31%
			Linda Raymond	1,212	6.03%
			Matt Stroyan	698	3.47%

In the 2007 elections, the citizens of Leduc elected one mayor, six aldermen (all at large), two of the Black Gold Regional Schools' seven trustees (as Ward Leduc), and two of the St. Thomas Aquinas Roman Catholic Separate Regional Division No. 38's nine trustees (one from each of Wards Leduc 1 & Leduc 2).

=== Lethbridge ===
In the 2007 elections, the citizens of Lethbridge elected eight aldermen (at large), the seven Lethbridge School District No. 51 trustees (at large), and five of the Holy Spirit Roman Catholic Separate Regional Division No. 4's nine trustees (as Ward 2). The incumbent mayor had no challengers.

=== Medicine Hat ===
In the 2007 elections, the citizens of Medicine Hat elected one mayor, eight aldermen (all at large), the five Medicine Hat School District No. 76 trustees (at large), and four of the Medicine Hat Catholic Separate Regional Division No. 20's five trustees (as Ward Medicine Hat).

=== Red Deer ===
In the 2007 elections, the citizens of Red Deer elected one mayor, eight councillors (all at large), the seven Red Deer School District No. 104 trustees (at large), and five of the Red Deer Catholic Regional Division No. 39's seven trustees (as Ward Red Deer).

=== Spruce Grove ===
In the 2007 elections, the citizens of Spruce Grove elected one mayor, six aldermen (all at large), and two of the Parkland School Division No. 70's seven trustees (as Ward 5). The incumbent mayor Ken Scott, did not run, and the three incumbent Evergreen Catholic Separate Regional Division No. 2 Ward 2 trustees were not challenged (Spruce Grove being part of Ward 2, total nine trustees).

=== St. Albert ===
City of St. Albert
Mayor			Councillors		
Candidate	Votes	%	Candidate	Votes	%
**Nolan Crouse**	**8,857**	**58.2**	**Lorie Garritty**	**8,738**	**57.5**
Garry Woo	4,308	28.3	**Len Bracko**	**8,052**	**52.9**
Richard Plain	2,043	13.4	**James C. Burrows**	**6,880**	**45.2**
			**Roger Lemieux**	**6,757**	**44.4**
			**Gareth Jones**	**5,989**	**39.4**
			**Carol Watamaniuk**	**5,954**	**39.2**
			Malcolm Parker	5,819	38.3
			David Climenhaga	5,804	38.2
			Stanley Haroun	5,178	34.0
			Wes Brodhead	5,173	34.0
			Bob Russell	5,069	33.3
			Frances Badrock	2,678	17.6

In the 2007 elections, the citizens of St. Albert elected one mayor and six councillors (all at large). The incumbent mayor Paul Chalifoux did not run, and the Greater St. Albert Catholic (Public) Schools' four Ward St. Albert trustees (total seven trustees) and the St. Albert Protestant Separate School Division No. 6's five trustees (at large) were unchallenged.

=== Wetaskiwin ===
City of Wetaskiwin
Mayor			Aldermen		
Candidate	Votes	%	Candidate	Votes	%
**Don Montgomery**	**Acclaimed**		**Bill Elliot**		
			**Barry Hawkes**		
			**Mark McFaul**		
			**Glenn Ruecker**		
			**Gail Taylor**		
**Dave Anderson**
Donna Andres
Kevin Miller
Dale Unland

In the 2007 elections, the citizens of Wetaskiwin elected six aldermen (at large) and three of the Wetaskiwin Regional Division No. 11's eight trustees (as Ward City), and participated in electing two of the St. Thomas Aquinas Roman Catholic Separate Regional Division No. 38's nine trustees (as Ward Wetaskiwin). The incumbent mayor had no challengers.

==== By-election ====
Wetaskiwin By-election
Alderman
Candidate	Votes	%
**Dale Crabtree**	**555**	**37.8%**
Lousie Nadeau	403	27.5%
Donna Andres	299	20.4%
Brian Hockin	138	9.4%
Albert Weremey	72	4.9%

After it was announced that Alderman Dave Anderson would be leaving council, a by-election was held on September 15, 2008, to fill the empty seat, only 16.4% of eligible voters turned-out for the vote.

== Towns ==
The following are the available election results for Alberta towns with a population over 8,500, plus the notable town of Slave Lake. Bold indicates elected, and incumbents are italicized.

=== Beaumont ===
Town of Beaumont
Mayor			Councillors		
Candidate	Votes	%	Candidate	Votes	%
**Camille Berube**	**1,232**	**43.5%**	Jay Archibald		
Gill Poitras	801	28.3%	Jacqueline Biollo		
Bill McNamara	798	28.2%	Larry Goodhope		
			Keith Gylander		
			Bruce LeCren		
			Louise White-Gibbs		

In the 2007 elections, the citizens of Beaumont elected one mayor, six councillors (all at large), and one of the Black Gold Regional Schools' seven trustees, and participated in electing one of the St. Thomas Aquinas Roman Catholic Separate Regional Division No. 38's nine trustees.

=== Canmore ===
Town of Canmore
Mayor			Councillors			
Candidate	Votes	%	Candidate	Votes	≥%	≤%
**Ron Casey**	**Acclaimed**		**Pam Hilstad**	**1,703**	**16.34**	**20.45**
			**André Gareau**	**1,521**	**14.59**	**18.27**
			**Shane Jonker**	**1,246**	**11.95**	**14.96**
			**Jim Ridley**	**1,221**	**11.71**	**14.66**
			**Corina Dootjes**	**1,164**	**11.17**	**13.98**
			**Ed Russell**	**767**	**7.36**	**9.21**
			Jason Best	702	6.73	8.43
			[Candidate 8]	≤701	0.01	7.77
			[Candidate 9]	≤700	0.01	7.20
			[Candidate 10]	≤699	0.01	6.71

In the 2007 elections, the citizens of Canmore elected six councillors (at large), and participated in electing three of the Canadian Rockies Regional Division No. 12's seven trustees, and one of the Christ the Redeemer Catholic Separate Regional Division No. 3's eight trustees. The incumbent mayor had no challengers.

=== Chestermere ===
Town of Chestermere
Mayor			Councillors		
Candidate	Votes	%	Candidate	Votes	%
**Patricia Matthews**	**1,281**	**53.4%**	Patrick Bergen		
Jeff Colvin	637	26.5%	Heather Davies		
Ada Rawlings	483	20.1%	Kelsey Johnson		
			Tim Reid		
			Christopher Steeves		
			Stu Hutchison		

In the 2007 elections, the citizens of Chestermere elected one mayor and six councillors (all at large), and participated in electing one of the Rocky View School Division No. 41's seven trustees, and one of the Calgary Catholic School District's seven trustees. The incumbent mayor Dave Mikkelsen, did not run.

=== Cochrane ===
Town of Cochrane
Mayor			Councillors		
Candidate	Votes	%	Candidate	Votes	%
**Truper McBride**	**1,695**	**44.5%**	**Joann Churchill**	**2,465**	**13.36%**
Ken Bech	1,464	38.4%	**Tara McFadden**	**2,120**	**11.49%**
Linda Campbell	414	10.9%	**Miles Chester**	**1,936**	**10.49%**
Thomas Pateman	237	6.2%	**Ross Watson**	**1,590**	**8.62%**
			**Ivan Davies**	**1,587**	**8.60%**
			**Brenda Sine**	**1,573**	**8.52%**
			Gary Sawatzky	1,566	8.49%
			Judy Stewart	1,562	8.46%
			Adamo Cocuzzoli	1,184	6.42%
			Marty Lee	1,110	6.01%
			Ken Koop	948	5.13%
			Neil McLean	425	2.30%
			Fred Palen	389	2.11%

In the 2007 elections, the citizens of Cochrane elected one mayor, six councillors (all at large), and one of the Rocky View School Division's seven trustees. The Calgary Catholic School District's Ward 1/2 incumbent trustee had no challengers.

=== High River ===
Town of High River
Mayor			Councillors		
Candidate	Votes	%	Candidate	Votes	%
**Les Rempel**	**2,068**	**69.1%**	**Emile Blokland**		
Floyd Langenhoff	924	30.9%	**Tom Bragg**		
			**Al Gillis**		
			**Betty (Gow) Hiebert**		
			**Bob McCracken**		
			**Don Moore**		
			Cyril Abbott		
			Glenda Cutforth		
			Frank VanDonzel		
			[Candidate 10]		
			[Candidate 11]		

In the 2007 elections, the citizens of High River elected one mayor, six councillors (all at large), and one of the Foothills School Division No. 38's five trustees, and participated in electing one of the Christ the Redeemer Catholic Separate Regional Division No. 3's eight trustees.

=== Hinton ===
Town of Hinton
Mayor			Councillors		
Candidate	Votes	%	Candidate	Votes	%
**Glenn Taylor**	**1,166**	**50.8%**	Bill Bulger		
Dale Currie	1,128	49.2%	Ian Duncan		
			Mike Jodoin		
			Buzz Johnson		
			Jane Macridis		
			Stephen Mitchell		

In the 2007 elections, the citizens of Hinton elected one mayor and six councillors (all at large), and participated in electing one of the Grande Yellowhead Regional Division No. 35's six trustees, and one of the Evergreen Catholic Separate Regional Division No. 2's eight trustees.

=== Lacombe ===
Town of Lacombe
Mayor			Councillors			
Candidate	Votes	%	Candidate	Votes	≥%	≤%
**Judy Gordon**	**Acclaimed**		**Ian Foster**	**1,206**	**11.1**	**19.2**
			**Steve Christie**	**1,109**	**10.2**	**17.7**
			**W. J. (Bill) McQuesten**	**1,040**	**9.6**	**16.6**
			**Outi Way**	**1,009**	**9.3**	**16.1**
			**Dawn Parent**	**973**	**9.0**	**15.5**
			**Wayne Rempel**	**923**	**8.5**	**14.7**
			Beverley Cousins-Beckley	≤922	0.0	12.8
			Tracey Everett	≤922	0.0	12.8
			Fran Kelly	≤922	0.0	12.8
			[Candidate 10]	≤922	0.0	12.8
			[Candidate 11]	≤922	0.0	12.8

In the 2007 elections, the citizens of Lacombe elected six councillors (at large), and participated in electing two of the Wolf Creek School Division No. 72's six trustees, and one of the St. Thomas Aquinas Roman Catholic Separate Regional Division No. 38's nine trustees. The incumbent mayor had no challengers.

=== Okotoks ===
Town of Okotoks
Mayor			Councillors		
Candidate	Votes	%	Candidate	Votes	%
**Bill McAlpine**	**1,813**	**70.5%**	Stephen Clark		
Dave Clark	517	20.1%	Beth Kish		
Dave R. Clarke	240	9.3%	Naydene Lewis		
			Bill Robertson		
			Ed Sands		
			Ralph Wilson		

In the 2007 elections, the citizens of Okotoks elected one mayor, six councillors (all at large), and one of the Foothills School Division No. 38's five trustees, and participated in electing one of the Christ the Redeemer Catholic Separate Regional Division No. 3's eight trustees.

=== Slave Lake ===
In the 2007 elections, the citizens of Slave Lake elected one mayor and six councillors (all at large), and participated in electing two of the High Prairie School Division No. 48's eight trustees (as Ward 4). The voters were also asked a series of plebiscite questions.

=== Stony Plain ===
Town of Stony Plain
Mayor			Councillors		
Candidate	Votes	%	Candidate	Votes	%
**Ken Lemke**	**1,306**	**41.7%**	**William Choy**	**2,443**	**17.38%**
Paul McCann	1,047	33.5%	**Darren Badry**	**2,408**	**17.13%**
Ingrid R. Schulz	559	17.9%	**Dwight Ganske**	**1,686**	**11.99%**
Harold Olson	217	6.9%	**Robert Twerdoclib**	**1,470**	**10.46%**
			**Judy Bennett**	**1,199**	**8.53%**
			**Pat Hansard**	**1,173**	**8.34%**
			Shirley Akins	1,150	8.18%
			Harold Pawlechko	890	6.33%
			Russell Kreye	851	6.05%
			Donald Butlin	789	5.61%

In the 2007 elections, the citizens of Stony Plain elected one mayor, six councillors (all at large), and one of the Parkland School Division No. 70's seven trustees. The incumbent mayor Donna Cowan, did not run, and the Evergreen Catholic Separate Regional Division No. 2's two Ward 1 trustees were unchallenged.

=== Strathmore ===
Town of Strathmore
Mayor			Councillors		
Candidate	Votes	%	Candidate	Votes	%
**George Lattery**	**953**	**36.06%**	**Earl Best**		
Peter Renny	881	33.33%	**Mike Lloyd**		
Keith Schneider	809	30.61%	**John Rempel**		
			**Bob Sobol**		
			**Brad Walls**		
			**Lois Wegener**		
			J. Greer		
			T. Owel		
			F. Rappel		

In the 2007 elections, the citizens of Strathmore elected one mayor, six councillors (all at large), and two of the Golden Hills School Division No. 75's seven trustees, and participated in electing one of the Christ the Redeemer Catholic Separate Regional Division No. 3's eight trustees.

=== Sylvan Lake ===
Town of Sylvan Lake
Mayor			Councillors		
Candidate	Votes	%	Candidate	Votes	%
**Susan Samson**	**1,474**	**89.5%**	**Joan Barnes**	**824**	**10.07%**
Tina Thiel	173	10.5%	**Richard Backs**	**813**	**9.93%**
			**Ken MacVicar**	**795**	**9.71%**
			**Judith Payne**	**723**	**8.83%**
			**Frank Peck**	**700**	**8.55%**
			**Lynda Sills-Fiedler**	**668**	**8.16%**
			Laverne Asselstine	600	7.33%
			Ted Parks	550	6.72%
			Ted Iverson	546	6.67%
			Donna-Mae Roth	435	5.31%
			Charles Everest	416	5.08%
			Sheldon Pierson	381	4.65%
			Lori Fehr	282	3.44%
			William Trefry	237	2.90%
			Jacci Izat	216	2.64%

In the 2007 elections, the citizens of Sylvan Lake elected one mayor and six councillors (all at large), and participated in electing one of the Chinook's Edge School Division No. 73's nine trustees. The incumbent mayor Bryan Lambertson, did not run.

=== Whitecourt ===
Town of Whitecourt
Mayor			Councillors		
Candidate	Votes	%	Candidate	Votes	%
**Trevor Thain**	**1,274**	**58.3%**	**Norman Hodgson**	**1,414**	**14.47%**
Larry McConnell	911	41.7%	**Bill McAree**	**1,343**	**13.74%**
			**Don Guenette**	**1,303**	**13.33%**
			**Bob Walker**	**1,125**	**11.51%**
			**Williard Strebchuk**	**1,081**	**11.06%**
			**Nieta World**	**999**	**10.22%**
			Darlene Chartrand	886	9.06%
			Shannon Kyle	817	8.36%
			Jeanne MacMillan	806	8.25%

In the 2007 elections, the citizens of Whitecourt elected one mayor and six councillors (all at large), and participated in electing two of the Northern Gateway Regional Division No. 10's nine trustees, and two of the Living Waters Catholic Regional Division No. 42's six trustees.

==== By-election ====
Whitecourt By-election
Councillors
Candidate	Votes	%
**Derek Schlosser**	**373**	**28.8%**
**Darlene Chartrand**	**298**	**23.0%**
Chris Ashcroft	290	22.4%
Ken Podulsky	230	17.7%
Ken Roncin	106	8.2%

After it was announced that Councillors Bob Walker and Nieta World would be leaving council, a by-election was held on May 4, 2009, to fill the empty seats, only 11.5% of eligible voters turned-out for the vote.

== Specialized municipalities ==
The following are the available election results for Alberta specialized municipalities with a population over 20,000, these include the urban service areas of Fort McMurray and Sherwood Park. Bold indicates elected, and incumbents are italicized.

=== Strathcona County ===
Strathcona County
			Councillors								
Mayor			Ward 1			Ward 2			Ward 3		
Candidate	Votes	%	Candidate	Votes	%	Candidate	Votes	%	Candidate	Votes	%
**Cathy Olesen**	**8,056**	**39.1%**	**Victor Bidzinski**	**2,022**	**57.1%**	**Roxanne Carr**	**1,567**	**49.4%**	**Linda Osinchuk**	**2,620**	**78.5%**
Ken Lesniak	6,344	30.8%	Tom Pandos	1,521	42.9%	Dave Anderson	933	29.4%	Teunis Paul Krüger	719	21.5%
Brent Jewell	6,202	30.1%				Randy Wnuk	453	14.3%			
						Len Goulet	220	6.9%			
			Ward 4			Ward 5			Ward 6		
			**Peter Wlodarcazk**	**Acclaimed**		**Jacquie Fenske**	**Acclaimed**		**Alan Dunn**	**1,177**	**57.3%**
			Ward 7			Ward 8			George Key	476	23.2%
			**Glen Lawrence**	**884**	**54.2%**	**Jason Gariepy**	**1,962**	**59.7%**	Darien Masse	381	18.5
			Don McPherson	748	45.8%	Gary Burns	1,327	40.3%	Cyrus Welgan	21	1.0%

In the 2007 elections, the citizens of Strathcona elected one mayor, six of their eight councillors (one from each of eight wards, one more than previous), five of the Elk Island Public Schools Regional Division No. 14's nine trustees (3 from Ward Sherwood Park, and 1 from each of Wards Strathcona North & Strathcona South), and four of the Elk Island Catholic Separate Regional Division No. 41's seven trustees (supporters in Sherwood Park). Two of the incumbent councillors were unchallenged.

=== Wood Buffalo ===
In the 2007 elections, the citizens of the Regional Municipality of Wood Buffalo elected one mayor, nine of their ten councillors (from four wards), the five Fort McMurray Public School District trustees (in Fort McMurray), and four of the Northland School Division No. 61's 23 school boards (outside Fort McMurray, five trustees each). One incumbent Councillor had no challengers, and the five trustee candidates for the Fort McMurray Roman Catholic Separate School District No. 32 (in Fort McMurray) were unchallenged.

==== By-election ====
A by-election was held on June 9, 2008 to fill an empty seat on council.

== Municipal districts ==
The following are the available election results for Alberta municipal districts (counties) with a population over 10,000. Bold indicates elected, and incumbents are italicized.

=== M.D. of Bonnyville ===
M.D. of Bonnyville
			Councillors								
Reeve			Ward 1			Ward 2			Ward 3		
Candidate	Votes	%	Candidate	Votes	%	Candidate	Votes	%	Candidate	Votes	%
**Ed Rondeau**	**1,049**	**39.6%**	**Donald Sinclair**	**287**	**59.5%**	**David Fox**	**209**	**54.7%**	**Mike Krywiak**	**306**	**60.0%**
Eva Urlacher	777	29.3%	Werner Gisler	135	28.0%	Ken Hayter	173	45.3%	Harold Ross	204	40.0%
Victor Stapleton	416	15.7%	Ken Hesson	60	12.4%						
Robert Engleder	406	15.3%	Ward 4			Ward 5			Ward 6		
			**Barry Kalinski**	**311**	**55.5%**	**Andy Wakaruk**	**249**	**68.0%**	**Delano Tolley**	**213**	**54.3%**
			Judy Cabay	144	25.7%	Ronald Flathers	117	32.0%	Patricia Stang	179	45.7%
			Vernon Lynes	74	13.2%						
			Marvin Tkachuk	31	5.5%						

In the 2007 elections, the citizens of the Municipal District of Bonnyville No. 87 elected one reeve, six councillors (one from each of six wards), and three of the Northern Lights School Division No. 69's nine trustees (as Ward 1), and participated in electing three of the Lakeland Roman Catholic Separate School District No. 150's seven trustees (supporters near Bonnyville). The incumbent reeve Ken Foley, did not run.

=== Clearwater County ===
Clearwater County
Councillors
Division 1			Division 2			Division 3		
Candidate	Votes	%	Candidate	Votes	%	Candidate	Votes	%
**Ken Qually**	**Acclaimed**		**Dick Wymenga**			**Larry Kowatch**		
Division 4			Jeff Bradshaw			Chuck Shipley		
**Dwight Oliver**			Division 5					
[Candidate 2]			**Robert Bryant**			Division 6		
Division 7			William Coghill			**Earl Graham**		
**Patrick Alexander**	**Acclaimed**		Kelly Spongberg			[Candidate 2]		

In the 2007 elections, the citizens of Clearwater elected five of their seven councillors (one from each of seven divisions) and two of the Wild Rose School Division No. 66's six trustees (one from each of Wards 3 & 4). Two of the incumbent councillors were unchallenged, and council appointed Division 7 Councillor Patrick Alexander the County Reeve.

=== M.D. of Foothills ===
M.D. of Foothills
Councillors
Division 1			Division 2			Division 3		
Candidate	Votes	%	Candidate	Votes	%	Candidate	Votes	%
**Ralph Nelson**			**Roy McLean**			**Barbara Castell**		
Division 4			Division 5			Division 6		
**Terry Waddock**			**Ron Chase**			**Larry Spilak**		
Division 7
**Ted Mills**								

In the 2007 elections, the citizens of the Municipal District of Foothills No. 31 elected seven councillors (one from each of seven divisions) and three of the Foothills School Division No. 38's five trustees (one from each of Wards 1, 2, & 3), and participated in electing two of the Christ the Redeemer Catholic Separate Regional Division No. 3's eight trustees (supporters near High River & Okotoks). Council appointed Division 2 Councillor Roy McLean the County Reeve.

=== County of Grande Prairie ===
County of Grande Prairie
Councillors
Division 1			Division 2			Division 3		
Candidate	Votes	%	Candidate	Votes	%	Candidate	Votes	%
**Everett McDonald**	**Acclaimed**		**Sharon L. Nelson**	**214**	**44.9%**	**Leanne Beaupre**	**Acclaimed**	
Division 4			Kurt Balderston	145	30.4%	Division 5		
**Jack O'Toole**	**Acclaimed**		Terry Dale McNutt	118	24.7%	**Pat Jacobs**	**212**	**81.2%**
Division 6			Division 7			Norman Hanson	49	18.8%
**Lois Dueck**	**110**	**39.3%**	**Frank Lowen**	**278**	**74.7%**	Division 8		
Alice McKay	86	30.7%	Stephen C. Blum	49	13.2%	**Richard Harpe**	**Acclaimed**	
Dalton L. Longson	84	30.0%	Andy Hommy	45	12.1%			
Division 9
**Mary Ann Eckstrom**	**Acclaimed**							

In the 2007 elections, the citizens of the County of Grande Prairie No. 1 elected four of their nine councillors (one from each of nine divisions) and five of the Peace Wapiti School Division No. 76's nine trustees (one from each of Wards 3, 4, 5, 6, & 7), and participated in electing six of the Grande Prairie Roman Catholic Separate School District No. 28's seven trustees (supporters near Beaverlodge, Grande Prairie, & Sexsmith). Five of the incumbent councillors were unchallenged, and council appointed Division 1 Councillor Everett McDonald the County Reeve.

=== Lacombe County ===
Lacombe County
Councillors
Division 1			Division 2			Division 3		
Candidate	Votes	%	Candidate	Votes	%	Candidate	Votes	%
**Rod McDermand**	**Acclaimed**		**Bill Knight**	**245**	**76.3%**	**Cliff Soper**	**Acclaimed**	
			Ed Kingston	76	23.7%			
Division 4			Division 5			Division 6		
**Linda Landmark**	**Acclaimed**		**Ken Wigmore**	**Acclaimed**		**Keith Stephenson**	**118**	**44.9%**
Division 7						Bob Szasz	**118**	**44.9%**
**Terry Engen**	**Acclaimed**					Kent Williamson	27	10.3%

In the 2007 elections, the citizens of Lacombe County elected two of their seven councillors (one from each of seven divisions) and three of the Wolf Creek School Division No. 72's six trustees (from Wards 4 & 5), and participated in electing a Wolf Creek trustee from Ward 1, and one of the St. Thomas Aquinas Roman Catholic Separate Regional Division No. 38's nine trustees (supporters near Lacombe). All seven incumbent councillors re-ran, five were unchallenged, and one lost in a tie breaker draw; council appointed Division 7 Councillor Terry Engen the County Reeve.

=== Leduc County ===
Leduc County
Councillors
Division 1			Division 2			Division 3		
Candidate	Votes	%	Candidate	Votes	%	Candidate	Votes	%
**Reinhold Ortlieb**			**Marvin Molzan**	**Acclaimed**		**Mary-Ann McDonald**		
Roy Eckert						John Schonewille		
Division 4			Division 5			David Rudzki		
**John Whaley**	**Acclaimed**		**Betty Glassman**			Division 6		
Division 7			Donovan Goebel			**Vern Siemens**		
**Audrey Kelto**			Ron Kozial			Ruth Harrison		
Dick Cornish			Arja Patrick					

In the 2007 elections, the citizens of Leduc County elected five of their seven councillors (one from each of seven divisions) and three of the Black Gold Regional Schools' seven trustees (one from each of Wards County West, Central, & East), and participated in electing three of the St. Thomas Aquinas Roman Catholic Separate Regional Division No. 38's nine trustees (supporters near Beaumont & Leduc) and one of the Evergreen Catholic Separate Regional Division No. 2's nine trustees (supporters near Devon). Two of the incumbent councillors were unchallenged, and council appointed Division 2 Councillor Marvin Molzan the Mayor.

=== County of Lethbridge ===
County of Lethbridge
Councillors
Division 1			Division 2			Division 3		
Candidate	Votes	%	Candidate	Votes	%	Candidate	Votes	%
**Lorne Hickey**	**Acclaimed**		**John Willms**	**Acclaimed**		**Henry Doeve**	**Acclaimed**	
Division 4			Division 5			Division 6		
**Bonnie Cote**	**Acclaimed**		**Hans Rutz**	**Acclaimed**		**Tom White**	**150**	**65.5%**
Division 7						Mark Osaka	79	34.5%
**Morris Zeinstra**	**160**	**58.4%**						
John Vanden Broeke	114	41.6%						

In the 2007 elections, the citizens of Lethbridge County elected two of their seven councillors (one from each of seven divisions) and five of the Palliser Regional Division No. 26's six trustees (one from each of five divisions), and participated in electing seven of the Holy Spirit Roman Catholic Separate Regional Division No. 4's nine trustees (supporters near Coaldale, Lethbridge, & Picture Butte). Five of the council candidates were unchallenged (three being incumbents,) and council appointed Division 1 Councillor Lorne Hickey the County Reeve.

=== Mountain View County ===
Mountain View County
Councillors
Division 1			Division 2			Division 3		
Candidate	Votes	%	Candidate	Votes	%	Candidate	Votes	%
**Gwene Day**			**Lana Yakimchuk**			**Everett Page**		
Division 4			Division 5			Division 6		
**Kathy Blain**			**Gerald Ingeveld**			**Liz Negropontes**		
Division 7
**Al Kemmere**								

In the 2007 elections, the citizens of Mountain View County elected seven councillors (one from each of seven divisions) and four of the Chinook's Edge School Division No. 73's nine trustees (one from each of Wards 6, 7, 8, & 9). Council appointed Division 7 Councillor Al Kemmere the County Reeve.

=== Parkland County ===
Parkland County
			Councillors								
Mayor			Division 1			Division 2			Division 3		
Candidate	Votes	%	Candidate	Votes	%	Candidate	Votes	%	Candidate	Votes	%
**Rob Weideman**	**2,514**	**48.5%**	**Jo Szady**			**Pat Brennan**	**409**	**51.4%**	**Clifford Goerz**		
Phyllis Kobasiuk	2,462	47.5%	[Candidate 2]			Dianne Allen	386	48.6%	[Candidate 2]		
Jim Rustand	204	3.9%	Division 4			Division 5			Division 6		
			**Darrell Hollands**			**Ken Darby**	**507**	**51.7%**	**Tracy Melnyk**		
			[Candidate 2]			Gary MacDougall	473	48.3%	Al Kowalenko		

In the 2007 elections, the citizens of Parkland County elected one mayor, six councillors (one from each of six divisions), and four of the Parkland School Division No. 70's six trustees (one from each of Wards 1, 2, 4, & 6), and participated in electing five of the Evergreen Catholic Separate Regional Division No. 2's nine trustees (supporters near Spruce Grove & Stony Plain).

=== Red Deer County ===
Red Deer County
			Councillors								
Mayor			Division 1			Division 2			Division 3		
Candidate	Votes	%	Candidate	Votes	%	Candidate	Votes	%	Candidate	Votes	%
**Earl Kinsella**	**2,082**	**53.2%**	**Jim Wood**	**598**	**66.7%**	**Reimar Poth**	**317**	**54.9%**	**Penny Archibald**	**407**	**64.7%**
Debra Hanna	1,831	46.8%	John Perry	298	33.3%	Robert Schwartz	260	45.1%	Paul Pettypiece	175	27.8%
			Division 4			Division 5			Lorna Gresham	47	7.5%
			**David Hoar**	**500**	**80.5%**	**Jim Lougheed**	**442**	**45.4%**	Division 6		
			Veronica Duncan	121	19.5%	C.M. Russell Wolf	269	27.6%	**George Gehrke**	**Acclaimed**	
						Stan Bell	262	26.9%			

In the 2007 elections, the citizens of Red Deer County elected one mayor (a new position, as a reeve was appointed previously), five of their six councillors (one from each of six divisions, one less than previous), and five of the Chinook's Edge School Division's nine trustees (one from each of Wards 1, 2, 3, 4, & 5). Division 6 had only one council candidate; italicized names in the table indicates individuals who were in council before this election (as the divisions were redistributed).

=== M.D. of Rocky View ===
M.D. of Rocky View
Councillors
Division 1			Division 2			Division 3		
Candidate	Votes	%	Candidate	Votes	%	Candidate	Votes	%
**Harvey Buckley**	**320**	**42.6%**	**Mitch Yurchak**	**481**	**62.3%**	**Gordon Branson**	**Acclaimed**	
Bob Everett	292	38.9%	Brenda Goode	291	37.7%	Division 4		
Wayne Fullerton	139	18.5%				**Jim Rheubottom**	**436**	**51.8%**
Division 5			Division 6			Rolly Ashdown	285	33.9%
**Earl Solberg**	**454**	**60.3%**	**Greg Boehike**	**307**	**58.6%**	Bruce Winstanley	120	14.3%
Jerry Gautreau	299	39.7%	John McMurray	217	41.4%			
Division 7			Division 8			Division 9		
**Lois Habberfield**	**Acclaimed**		**Hopeton Louden**	**725**	**72.7%**	**Paul McLean**	**Acclaimed**	
			Gerry Neustaedter	272	27.3%			

In the 2007 elections, the citizens of Rocky View County elected six of their nine councillors (one from each of nine divisions) and six of the Rocky View School Division's seven trustees (one from each of Wards 1, 2, 3, 4, 5, & 6), and participated in electing three of the Calgary Catholic School District's seven trustees (supporters near Airdrie, Chestermere, & Cochrane). Three of the incumbent councillors were unchallenged, and council appointed Division 7 Councillor Lois Habberfield the County Reeve.

=== Sturgeon County ===
Sturgeon County
			Councillors								
Mayor			Division 1			Division 2			Division 3		
Candidate	Votes	%	Candidate	Votes	%	Candidate	Votes	%	Candidate	Votes	%
**Don Rigney**	**2,260**	**52.8%**	**Donald McGeachy**	**498**	**54.4%**	**Mark Oberg**	**Acclaimed**		**Ken McGillis**	**Acclaimed**	
Helmut Hinteregger	2,020	47.2%	Graeme MacKay	418	45.6%						
			Division 4			Division 5			Division 6		
			**Jerry Kaup**	**345**	**44.1%**	**Joseph Milligan**	**450**	**58.7%**	**Karen Shaw**	**345**	**57.1%**
			Tom Soetart	267	34.1%	Remi Cyr	159	20.7%	Victor Pasay	259	42.9%
			Lawrence Kluthe	171	21.8%	Gladys Wachowich	158	20.6%			

In the 2007 elections, the citizens of Sturgeon County elected one mayor, four of their six councillors (one from each of six divisions), and the seven Sturgeon School Division No. 24 trustees (one from each of seven wards). Two of the incumbent councillors were unchallenged.

==== By-election ====
Sturgeon By-election
Councillor
Division 2
Candidate	Votes	%
**Tom Flynn**	**280**	**28.8%**
Craig Toth	134	**23.0%**
Barry Lupyrypa	125	22.4%

After it was announced that Councillor Mark Oberg would be leaving council, a by-election was held on April 27, 2009, to fill the empty seat, only 23.2% of eligible voters turned-out for the vote.

=== County of Wetaskiwin ===
County of Wetaskiwin
Councillors
Division 1			Division 2			Division 3		
Candidate	Votes	%	Candidate	Votes	%	Candidate	Votes	%
**Brenda Shantz**	**158**	**51.5%**	**Ken Ball**	**Acclaimed**		**Garry Dearing**	**Acclaimed**	
Bill Angus	149	48.5%	Division 4			Division 5		
			**Wayne Meyers**	**Acclaimed**		**Larry Mckeever**	**451**	**75.4%**
Division 6			Division 7			Richard Wilson	147	24.6%
**Nancy Watson**	**Acclaimed**		**Barry Dunn**	**Acclaimed**				

In the 2007 elections, the citizens of the County of Wetaskiwin No. 10 elected two of their seven councillors (one from each of seven divisions), and four of the Wetaskiwin Regional Division No. 11's eight trustees (one from each of Wards 1, 2, 3, & 4), and participated in electing two of the St. Thomas Aquinas Roman Catholic Separate Regional Division No. 38's nine trustees (supporters near Wetaskiwin). Five of the incumbent councillors were unchallenged, and council appointed Division 3 Councillor Garry Dearing the County Reeve.

=== Yellowhead County ===
Yellowhead County
			Councillors								
Mayor			Division 1			Division 2			Division 3		
Candidate	Votes	%	Candidate	Votes	%	Candidate	Votes	%	Candidate	Votes	%
**Gerald Soroka**			**George Webster**	**227**	**55.9%**	**Ewald Kwirant**	**241**	**72.8%**	**Jay Lowe**	**267**	**72.6%**
Incumbent			Glen Szautner	179	44.1%	Patricia Di Marcello	90	27.2%	Brian Kendrick	101	27.4%
[Candidate 3]			Division 4			Division 5			Division 6		
			**Larry Richter**	**Acclaimed**		**Cheryl Bissell**	**Acclaimed**		**Bill Velichko**	**Acclaimed**	
			Division 7			Division 8					
			**Roxanne Scherger**	**101**	**55.8%**	**Lavone Olson**	**Acclaimed**				
			Roger Byrt	80	44.2%						

In the 2007 elections, the citizens of Yellowhead County elected one mayor, four of their eight councillors (one from each of eight divisions), and four of the Grande Yellowhead Regional Division No. 35's six trustees, and participated in electing one of the Evergreen Catholic Separate Regional Division No. 2's eight trustees (supporters near Hinton) and one of the Living Waters Catholic Regional Division No. 42's six trustees (supporters near Edson). Four of the council candidates (three being incumbents) were unchallenged.

== Amalgamation plebiscite ==
Black Diamond/Turner Valley Amalgamation
Black Diamond			Turner Valley		
Response	Votes	%	Response	Votes	%
For	228	29%	For	493	66%
Against	557	71%	Against	258	34%

In early 2006, the towns of Black Diamond and Turner Valley initiated discussions on a possible amalgamation of the two municipalities. The discussions culminated in a plebiscite held concurrently with their municipal elections, where the question asked of voters was "Do you support an amalgamation of the Town of Black Diamond and the Town of Turner Valley to form one municipality?" The results of the plebiscite were 66% of Turner Valley voters were in favour of amalgamation, while 71% of Black Diamond voters were against amalgamation.

== See also ==
- Canadian electoral calendar, 2007
- Municipal elections in Canada
