= 2007 Canadian electoral calendar =

2007 elections in Canada

This is a list of elections in Canada in 2007. Included are provincial, municipal and federal elections, by-elections on any level, referendums and party leadership races at any level.

== January–April ==
- 8 February: Ferryland, Kilbride, Port au Port provincial by-elections in Newfoundland and Labrador. See also 2007 Newfoundland and Labrador provincial by-elections.
- 8 February: Burlington, Markham and York South—Weston provincial by-elections in Ontario. See also 2007 Ontario provincial by-elections.
- 12 February: Humber Valley, Newfoundland and Labrador by-election
- 5 March
  - 2007 Moncton East provincial by-election, New Brunswick
  - 2007 Martensville provincial by-election, Saskatchewan
- 13 March: Labrador West, Newfoundland and Labrador by-election
- 26 March: 2007 Quebec general election
- 27 April: 2007 Nova Scotia Liberal Party leadership election

== May–September ==
- 6 May
  - Municipal elections in Granby, Quebec
  - Municipal by-election in Rivière-du-Loup, Quebec
- 7 May: 2007 Nova Scotia Green Party leadership election
- 22 May: 2007 Manitoba general election
- 28 May: 2007 Prince Edward Island general election
- 12 June: Provincial by-elections in Calgary-Elbow and Drumheller-Stettler, Alberta
- 14 June: Ward 2 by-election in Milton, Ontario
- 17 September: Federal by-elections in Outremont, Roberval—Lac-Saint-Jean and Saint-Hyacinthe—Bagot
- 24 September: Charlevoix provincial by-election in Quebec

== October–December ==
- 1 October: 2007 Northwest Territories general election
- 2 October: Cole Harbour-Eastern Passage provincial by-election in Nova Scotia
- 9 October: 2007 Newfoundland and Labrador general election
- 9 October: 2007 Saint John, New Brunswick ward plebiscite
- 10 October: Ontario general election and electoral reform referendum, 2007
- 13 October: 2007 New Brunswick New Democratic Party leadership election
- 15 October: 2007 Belfast-Murray River provincial by-election in Prince Edward Island
- 15 October: 2007 Alberta municipal elections
- 21 October: 2007 Green Party of British Columbia leadership election
- 22 October: Plebiscite in Kugluktuk, Nunavut on forming an alcohol education committee
- 24 October: 2007 Saskatchewan municipal elections
- 4 November: Quebec English School board elections.
- 6 November: Grand Falls-Windsor-Buchans provincial by-election in Newfoundland and Labrador (postponed from general)
- 7 November
  - 2007 Saskatchewan general election
- 2 December: 2007 Quebec City municipal by-election
- 16 December: Outremont municipal by-election

== See also ==
- Municipal elections in Canada
- Elections in Canada
