= The Northern Gateway =

The Erie Canal
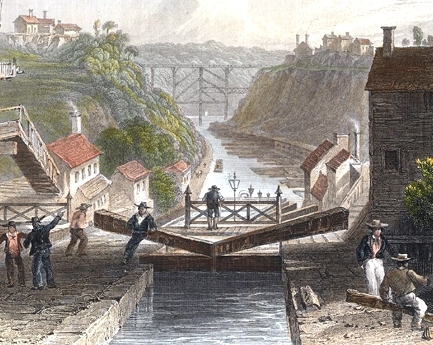
- at Lockport, New York in 1839

Specifications
- Locks: 83

History
- Original owner: New York State
- Principal engineer: Benjamin Wright
- Other engineers: Canvass White, Amos Eaton
- Construction began: July 4, 1817 at Rome, New York
- Date of first use: May 17, 1821
- Date completed: October 26, 1825
- Date restored: September 4, 1996

Geography
- Branch of: New York State Canal System

The Northern Gateway for antebellum trade was the primary trade route connecting the Midwestern United States with the Northeast and the Atlantic Ocean. The gateway's canals, rivers, and railroads drastically altered the makeup of America's economy, culture, and population distribution. As rail and waterway technology improved, the Northern Gateway became the preeminent trade conduit in the nation. It helped spur the growth of both eastern and western cities. Settlers rapidly began to settle in the burgeoning towns of the many trade points all along the gateway's route. It allowed goods and information to travel at unprecedented rates, which, in turn, completely re-vamped the style and processes of American culture and economics.

== Overview ==
The Northern Gateway's primary throughway was the Erie Canal, which was completed in 1825. This man-made waterway traversed New York state 364 miles from Albany to Buffalo. In effect, it connected New York City with Lake Erie due to the fact that the Hudson River unites New York City with Albany. Thus, this feat of human engineering opened up trade between the Atlantic Ocean and Midwestern cities like Chicago. The Saint Lawrence River is the other key waterway of the Northern Gateway. It largely defines the US-Canada border in the northeastern section of the continent. It runs from Lake Ontario in northwestern New York through Quebec and Ontario to the Atlantic Ocean, north of Maine. A later development to the infrastructure of the Northern Gateway was the New York Central Railroad, which was finished in 1852. While it took a little more time than the canals to gain considerable freight traffic, it ended up connecting New York City, Boston, Ontario, Quebec, Erie, and Chicago.

== Economic Significance ==
As time progressed, the Northern Gateway established itself as the foremost trade channel in the United States. Its close rival, the Northeastern Gateway, connected Philadelphia with Pittsburgh. However, it never really challenged the Northern Gateway in terms of volume of freight traffic. While the Northeastern Gateway's trade tonnage did increase during the antebellum period, it rarely carried more than 5% of westward shipments. Even after the state completed the very costly Mainline of the Pennsylvania Public Works in 1834, which was supposed to be the hallmark of the Northeastern Gateway, it only amounted to 5-10% of the Northern Gateway's traffic volume. By the late 1850s, it had surpassed the well-established Southern Gateway in total tonnage of freight shipments, and had become the unparalleled trade thoroughfare in the nation. While the Southern Gateway had prospered since the early 19th century from steamboat transportation and the collision of western rivers at its hub, New Orleans, the Northern Gateway's railroads and access to the Atlantic Ocean propelled it by the increasingly out-of-date Southern Gateway.

Western cities primarily sent lumber, grain, and meat eastward, while eastern metropolises dispatched textiles, leather, machinery, and drugs to the budding western conurbations. At first, most of the shipments along this route went westward. However, by 1842, tonnage from western states equaled that from New York. Shipments going westward from Albany had reached 82,000 tons in 1836, and would more than double from that already high figure by 1852. Wheat travelling east from the Great Lakes may have seen the greatest jump in commerce. In 1829, 3640 bushels were loaded into canal boats heading for Albany. The addition of agricultural processing in places like Michigan and Wisconsin, along with the greatly enhanced volume of total trade on the Northern Gateway, allowed this number to exceed 1 million bushels in 1841. As western farmers prospered from this incredible boom in staple sales, they also began demanding more goods from the east. As a result of their newfound wealth, 78 million pounds of merchandise would end up arriving at one of the Great Lakes key ports for sale to the western population. The Northern Gateway would play a central role in boosting eastward outbound shipments from 65,000 tons in 1810 to 4.7 million tons in 1860.

== Prices ==
The Northern Gateway afforded quicker and more extensive access to markets hundreds of miles away. As a result, price differences in various territories decreased, and the formation of monopolies was inhibited. This occurred because people could no longer profit on the notion that consumers only had access to local markets. Furthermore, the ease of access to distant producers allowed regions to focus on their comparative advantage. Eastern cities could focus on textiles and not have to grow their own grain. This allowed greater profits for both the manufacturing-minded east and the farm-minded west. The decreased transportation costs and travel time also decreased the price of many consumer goods and thus increased the population's real wealth.

== Population Distribution and Growth ==
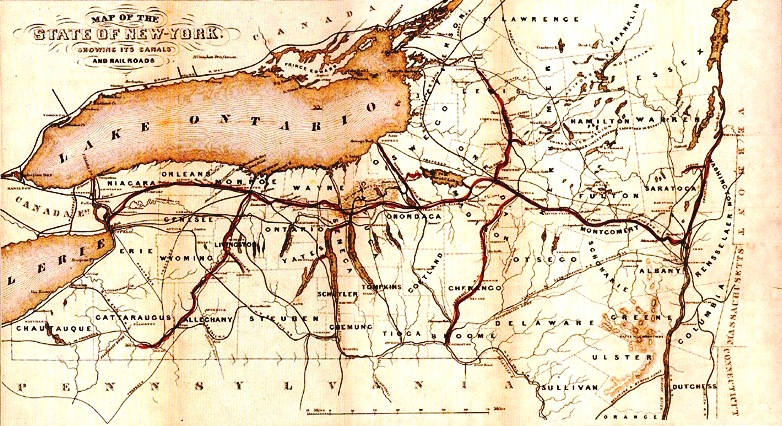
1853 Map of New York canals emboldened, center: the Erie Canal, other lines: railroads, rivers and county borders

As the Northern Gateway increased the size and profits of previously untapped western markets, people began flooding westward along the gateway's routes in search of similar windfalls. The population density of the area along the western section of the Erie Canal increased five-fold between 1817 and 1835. As capital was consistently being allocated westward, new cities shot up between New York City and Lake Erie. Rochester's population increased almost 25 times between 1820 and 1850, Syracuse saw a 13-fold enhancement, and Buffalo's population grew by about 21 times its original size during the same time period. Foreign immigrants contributed substantially to the increased population of western cities. For example, between 1840 arid 1845, 300,000 immigrants landed in New York City. However, the population only increased by 80,000, which means that the majority of immigrants travelled up the Hudson River to Albany or westward along the Erie Canal.

The Gateway did not solely spur the growth of western cities. In fact, some might say that New York City was its primary beneficiary. About New York City, 19th Century real estate mogul Samuel B. Ruggles stated, The flourishing growth of this city must be attributed almost entirely to the Erie Canal, which has opened our internal commerce with the West, and poured in upon us a rare, steady, and rapidly. Similarly, in 1842, the editor of the Albany Argus declared, "So long as New York remains at the head of the western trade, it must irresistibly advance in wealth, influence, and population, until she will be known not only as the great city of America, but as the great city of the world.".

== See also ==
- Erie Canal
- Philadelphia Main Line
