= Christ the Redeemer Catholic Separate Regional Division No. 3 =

School district in Alberta, Canada

Location
- #1 McRae Street, Okotoks, Alberta Brooks, Canmore, Drumheller, High River, Okotoks, Oyen, Strathmore Canada
- Coordinates: 50°43′31″N 113°58′29″W

District information
- Superintendent: Dr. Andrea Holowka
- Chair of the board: Ron Schreiber
- Schools: 16

Other information
- Elected trustees: John De Jong, Brooks; Vijay Domingo, Canmore; Paul Andrew, Drumheller; Joanne Van Donzel, High River; Ron Schreiber, Okotoks; Dale Rolheiser, Oyen; Harry Salm, Strathmore; Brian Lyttle, Turner Valley
- Website: www.redeemer.ab.ca

Christ the Redeemer Catholic Separate Regional Division No. 3 or Christ the Redeemer Catholic Schools is a publicly funded Catholic school jurisdiction serving students in a number of communities across southern Alberta, Canada.

== Communities ==
Communities within the Division include Okotoks, High River, Drumheller, Oyen, Brooks, Strathmore and Canmore. The division offices are in Okotoks.

The division operates a network of contracted school buses to serve smaller outlying communities as well as farms, ranches and rural dwellers. Some of the smaller communities served include Black Diamond, Turner Valley, Rosemary, Priddis and Longview.

== Origins ==
The origins of the district go back to the 1950s when Catholic parents in Drumheller and Oyen separately formed Catholic school districts and each opened a school, St. Anthony's School in Drumheller and Assumption School in Oyen. The then parish priest in Oyen, Father Molnar, was instrumental in helping with the foundation of the Oyen School. As the law stood in Alberta, a public meeting of all Catholics in the area (called a four by four from the size of the original school districts into which Alberta was divided) was called and a vote taken to see if a quorum was present (25%) and if a majority of eligible voters approved of the project.

St. Anthony's School in Drumheller originally offered high school classes, but the declining population in Drumheller due to the closing of the coal mines and the end of the baby boom made the high school a precarious proposition. After a few years, the school reverted to a kindergarten to Grade 9 configuration. Oyen originally offered Grades 1 to 9 at Assumption School, but the end of the baby boom and rural depopulation caused the offering to be restricted to Grades 1 to 6. Kindergarten classes were started in 1995.

By the late 1980s, Okotoks was growing fast and Catholic parents formed an exploratory group to study the feasibility of establishing a Catholic school. They were encouraged by the local parish priest, Fr. Greg McLellan. Among the key parents were Joanne Mercier, Mannie Fink-Fraser, Bev Palko, John Walsh, Ted Tatem, Jim Lewis and Paula Ford {the last five subsequently trustees and the last three chairmen of the board}. The new parish priest in Okotoks, Father Michael Storey, appointed in 1988, became a strong supporter of the project. Following a successful vote in Okotoks and a number of surrounding rural four by fours, the Okotoks Catholic School District was proclaimed in September 1988. The first institution, Good Shepherd School, opened in September 1990, in temporary facilities until a new facility opened in January, 1991. Kindergarten and Grade 1 were held at St. James Church in Okotoks while Grades 2 to 8 were held at Mossleigh School, a 45-minute bus ride east of town. The school opened with about 200 students. Growth was rapid and a high school Holy Trinity Academy opened in 1992 in shared facilities. In 2009 there are four Catholic schools in the town of 20,000.

By 1990, parents in High River began to be interested in a Catholic school, and working in cooperation with the Okotoks Catholic School District, they won a vote in 1992 to establish a Catholic school district. It was merged with the Okotoks Catholic School District into the Foothills Catholic School District and its first school, Holy Spirit Academy, opened in the old High River Hospital, a building that had served for many years as a nursing residence. There are now two Catholic schools in High River.

The Conservative provincial Government of Ralph Klein decided in 1994 to reduce the total number of school jurisdictions in Alberta from about 165 to around 60. It was left to individual districts to seek partners voluntarily or face a government solution. It certainly looked as if the Foothills Catholic District would be absorbed into the Calgary Catholic District, the solution for two other Catholic districts in Airdrie and Cochrane, both in the metro Calgary area. In fact, tentative approaches were made by a Calgary Catholic senior administrator to his counterpart in the Foothills Catholic District along these lines and Drumheller Catholic was slated to join Red Deer Catholic. It was expected that the Catholic school in Oyen would be closed and the district dissolved.

However, at a meeting at Lethbridge in January 1994, a consensus was reached between representatives from Drumheller Catholic and Foothills Catholic for a new type of decentralized regional division which left significant decision making in local hands. Representatives from Oyen were soon approached and found the plan attractive as well. Final details were worked out in a meeting at St. Anthony's Parish Hall in Drumheller on the Saturday after Easter of 1994. The Christ The Redeemer School Division came into existence on January 1, 1995. The first superintendent was Ron Wallace, who had been superintendent in Okotoks since its inception in 1989. Deputy superintendent was Dr. Bertha Wilson, who had been superintendent in Drumheller for some years. The superintendent in Oyen, Len Miller, retired, but was later elected as a trustee for the board from High River, subsequently serving a term as chairman. The first chairman of the board was Virginia Haahr of Okotoks.

== Amalgamation ==
The history of Christ The Redeemer School Division since its inception has been one of innovation, rapid growth and academic achievement. The jurisdiction now serves over 7300 students in sixteen schools in seven communities and recently received the Minister's Education Leadership Award (MELRA) in an unprecedented seventeen categories.

The jurisdiction's vision, mission and fundamental beliefs are brought to life by four foundational school community pillars including: faith; learning; safety and care; and stewardship.

As faith communities, schools embrace the teaching of the Magisterium of the Church. The Catholic faith permeates all that is done. Schools become faith communities when staff and students give witness to their faith. Jesus is the source of morals and values. Prayer is essential. As learning communities, schools believe the family is the fundamental unit of society and that parents are the primary educators of their children. The educational needs of all students must be met in a manner that does not deprive others of access to quality education. As safe and caring communities, schools believe that the infinite value of each person in God's eyes must be reflected in all that is done. This calls for respect in all relationships. As good stewards of resources, schools are called to be faithful stewards of God's creation. The board of trustees is accountable to the Bishop of the Diocese of Calgary, the Minister of Education, and parents and supporters. The board provides direction to its staff and students.

From earliest days, the division had a commitment to the needs of exceptional children. Within two years of its foundation, two new take out programs were introduced in all schools: Early Intervention programs (Kindergarten to Grade 3) targeting the needs of children at risk of academic delay; and, skills programs (Grades 4 to 12) designed to help students who were behind in academic performance. Teachers at common grade levels meet weekly to share strategies and compare student performance. And the metaresearch findings on effective teaching and classroom were endlessly repeated and incorporated into the working practices of the teachers and principals. As a result of this, Christ The Redeemer Catholic Schools soon emerged as the top academic performer of all the school jurisdictions in Alberta, a position it holds to this day as measured by Alberta Education's Accountability Pillar Report Card.

As part of its stewardship of resources pillar, the jurisdiction has become a national leader in designing and constructing "green" school facilities. Most recently (2008), the newly constructed Holy Trinity Academy (Okotoks, Alberta, Canada) was built to LEED Gold standards; the first high school to receive this prestigious recognition in Canada. LEED refers to the Leadership in Energy and Environmental Design Green Building Rating System, developed by the U.S. Green Building Council (USGBC). It provides a suite of standards for environmentally sustainable construction. The recently opened Our Lady of the Snows Catholic Academy (Canmore, Alberta, Canada) was also designed and built to LEED Gold standards. It is anticipated that the new St. Anthony's School (Drumheller, Alberta, Canada), currently under construction, will receive the same designation.

== Schools ==
- Assumption School, Oyen (K-6)
- Our Lady of the Snows Catholic Academy, Canmore (K-12)
- St. Anthony's School, Drumheller (K-12)

=== Brooks ===
- Holy Family Academy (K-4)
- Christ the King Academy (5-8)
- St. Joseph's Collegiate (9-12)
- St. Luke's Outreach Centre - Brooks (10-12)

=== High River ===
- Holy Spirit Academy (K-6)
- Notre Dame Collegiate (7-12)
- St. Luke's Outreach Centre - High River (10-12)

=== Okotoks ===
- École Good Shepherd School (K-6)
- St. Mary's School (K-6)
- St. Francis of Assisi Academy (K-9)
- St. John Paul II Collegiate (7-9)
- Holy Trinity Academy (10-12)
- St. Luke's Outreach Centre - Okotoks (10-12)

=== Strathmore ===
- Sacred Heart Academy (K-6)
- Holy Cross Collegiate (7-12)

=== Online/Homeschools ===
- The Centre for Learning @ Home (1-12)
- St. Paul's Academy (1-12)

== See also ==
- List of Alberta School Boards
