= St. Thomas Aquinas Roman Catholic Separate Regional Division No. 38 =

School district in Alberta, Canada

St. Thomas Aquinas Roman Catholic Separate Regional School Division No. 38 STAR Catholic Schools

Location
- 4906- 50 Ave., Leduc, Alberta, Canada, T9E 6W6 Beaumont, Drayton Valley, Lacombe, Leduc, Ponoka, Wetaskiwin Canada
- Coordinates: 53°15′51″N 113°33′4″W

District information
- Grades: Preschool - 12
- Superintendent: Laurie Kardynal
- Chair of the board: Donna Tugwood
- Schools: 12
- Budget: CA$38.0 million (2012/2013 (Approved))

Students and staff
- Students: 4,838

Other information
- Elected trustees: Donna Tugwood Board Chair Lacombe Liz Taylor-Sirois Vice Chair Beaumont Marilyn Burke Ponoka Jolyne De Marco Leduc Henry Effon Wetaskiwin Michael Linner Drayton Valley
- Website: www.starcatholic.ab.ca

St. Thomas Aquinas Roman Catholic Separate Regional Division No. 38 is a separate Catholic school authority in Central Alberta and is more commonly referred to as STAR Catholic Schools (an acronym used for St. Thomas Aquinas Roman).

== Size and service area ==
STAR Catholic Schools is an urban and rural school division, serving over 5,000 students across 12 schools in Beaumont, Drayton Valley, Leduc, Lacombe, Ponoka, and Wetaskiwin. The School Board is composed of seven trustees and the central office is located in Leduc.

Most recently, STAR Catholic was approved for a catholic high school in Beaumont —the community’s first Catholic high school which will be called St. Olivia Catholic High School.

== List of schools ==
The division includes the following schools.

City	School	Grades Served
Beaumont	Académie Saint-André Academy	Kindergarten to Grade 4
Drayton Valley	St. Anthony School	Preschool to Grade 8
Drayton Valley	Holy Trinity Academy	Grade 9 to Grade 12
Lacombe	Father Lacombe Catholic School	Kindergarten to Grade 9
Leduc	St. Benedict School	Kindergarten to Grade 6
Leduc	Notre Dame School	Kindergarten to Grade 6
Leduc	Christ the King Jr./Sr. High School	Grade 9 to Grade 12
Leduc	STAR Catholic Outreach School	Grade 10 to 12
Ponoka	St. Augustine School	Kindergarten to Grade 12
Wetaskawin	Sacred Heart School	Kindergarten to Grade 9
