= Northern Gateway Regional Division No. 10 =

School board in Alberta, Canada

Northern Gateway Regional Division No. 10 Northern Gateway Public Schools
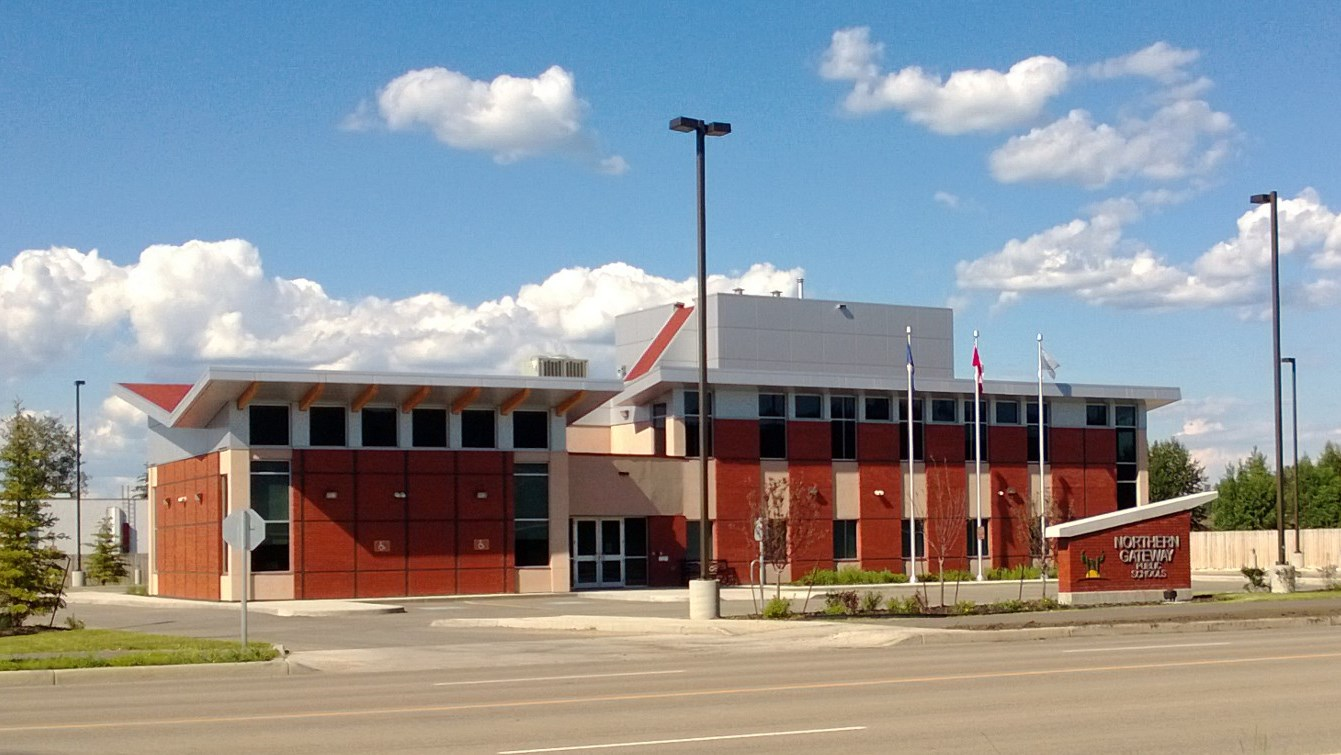

Location
- 4816 - 49 Avenue; Whitecourt, Alberta, Canada Canada
- Coordinates: 54°7′45″N 115°39′55″W

District information
- Superintendent: Kevin Andrea
- Chair of the board: Judy Muir
- Schools: 20
- Budget: CA$64.8 million (2018/2019)

Students and staff
- Students: 4,423

Other information
- Elected trustees: Judy Muir, Alberta Beach; Jim Hailes, Fox Creek; Robin O'Neil, Little Smoky; Albert Schalm, Mayerthorpe; Terry Slemko, Onoway; Sherry Jeffries, Sangudo; Gerry Steinke, Valleyview; Jim Govenlock, Whitecourt; Cindy Granley, Whitecourt
- Website: www.ngps.ca

Northern Gateway Regional Division No. 10 or Northern Gateway Public Schools is a public school board serving Woodlands County, Lac Ste. Anne County and part of the Municipal District of Greenview No. 16.

== Schools ==
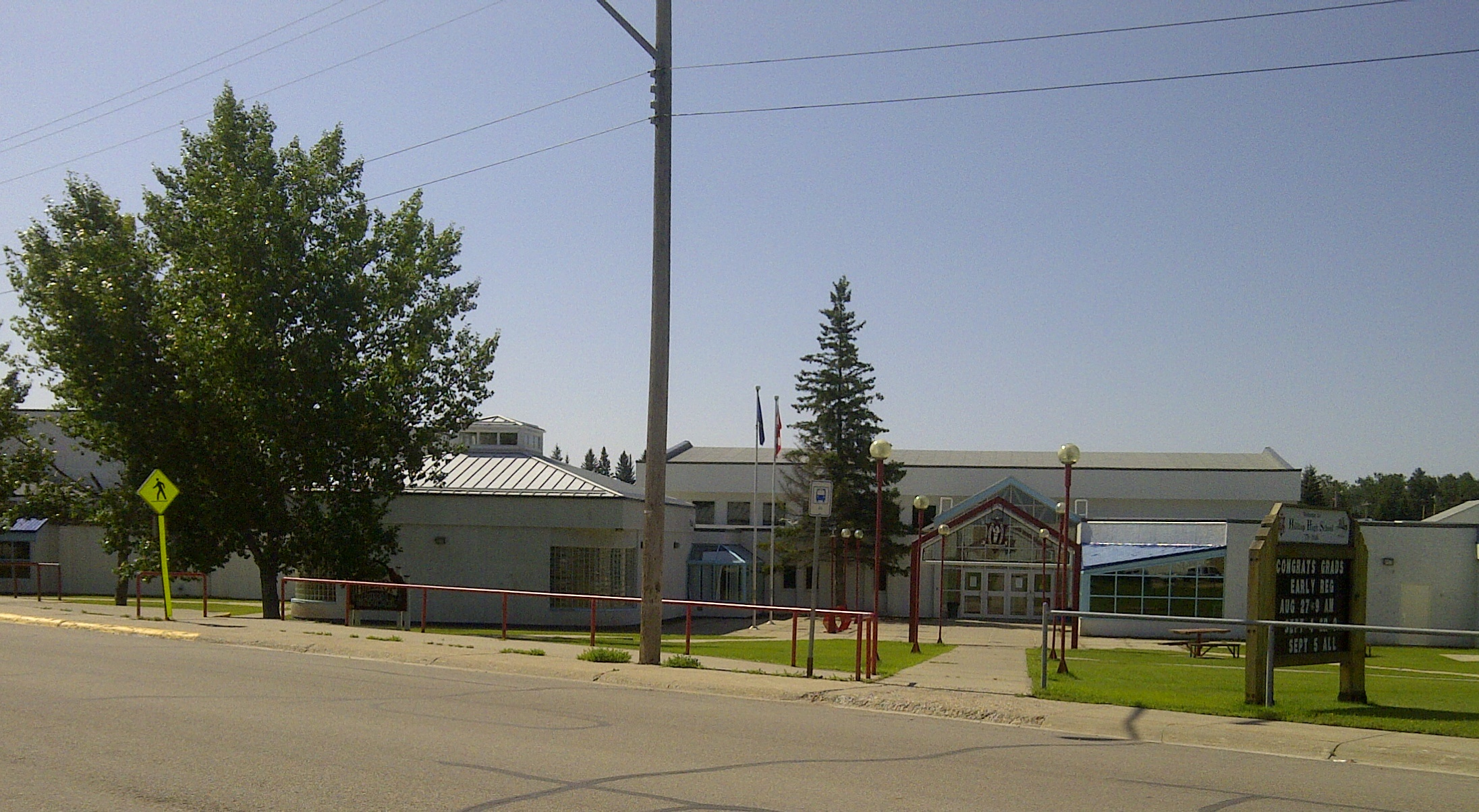
Hilltop High School main entrance

Whitecourt

- Pat Hardy Elementary School (PreK - 2)
- Whitecourt Central Elementary School (3-5)
- Percy Baxter Middle School (6-8)
- Hilltop Jr/Sr High School (9-12)

Valleyview

- Oscar Adolphson School (K-3)
- Harry Gray Elementary School (4-6)
- Hillside Jr/Sr High School (7-12)
- Homeland Colony School (K-9)
- Twilight Colony School (K-9)
- Valleyview Ranches Colony School (K-9)

Fox Creek

- Fox Creek School (K-12)

Mayerthorpe

- Elmer Elson Elementary School (K-6)
- Mayerthorpe Jr/Sr High School (7-12)
- Rochfort Bridge Colony School

Onoway and Area

- Darwell School (K-7)
- Grasmere School (K-7)
- Rich Valley School (K-7)
- Onoway Elementary School (K-7)
- Onoway Jr/Sr High School (8-12)

Sangudo

- Sangudo Community School (K-9)
