= Section 29 of the Canadian Charter of Rights and Freedoms =

Constitutional recognition of separate religious schools

Section 29 of the Canadian Charter of Rights and Freedoms specifically addresses rights regarding denominational schools and separate schools. Section 29 is not the source of these rights but instead reaffirms the pre-existing special rights belonging to Roman Catholics and Protestants, despite freedom of religion and religious equality under sections 2 and 15 of the Charter. Such rights may include financial support from the provincial governments. In the case Mahe v. Alberta (1990), the Supreme Court of Canada also had to reconcile denominational school rights with minority language educational rights under section 23 of the Charter.

== Text ==
The section reads:

29. Nothing in this Charter abrogates or derogates from any rights or privileges guaranteed by or under the Constitution of Canada in respect of denominational, separate or dissentient schools.

== Purpose ==
The Constitution of Canada contains a number of denominational school rights. They usually belong to Catholics and Protestants wherever they form the minority population of the relevant province. The former Chief Justice of Canada Beverley McLachlin once referred to this as an early form of freedom of religion in Canada.

Section 93 of the Constitution Act, 1867 awards jurisdiction over education to the provincial governments, with a few exceptions. Catholics have denominational school rights in Ontario. Both Catholics and Protestants had these rights in Quebec, until abrogated by the Constitution Amendment, 1997 (Québec). Quebec was and is predominantly Catholic (though the effects this has had on the province's politics have changed over the years; see Quiet Revolution). Section 17 of the Alberta Act, 1905 also guarantees denominational school rights for Catholics in Alberta. While the rights for Catholics and Protestants seem to contradict Charter values of equality, section 29 clarifies the privileges cannot be challenged on Charter grounds. It was inserted because the authors of the Constitution Act, 1982 did not want to be held responsible for challenging the old system.

As noted in the Supreme Court case ''Reference re Bill 30, An Act to Amend the Education Act (Ont.)'' [1987] 1 SCR 1148 (SCC), this clarification is really the only function of section 29. Section 29 does not itself shield the rights of denominational schools from the Charter, since the rights are themselves a part of the Constitution and thus cannot be unconstitutional or subject to Charter review. This line of thinking was confirmed by the Supreme Court in Gosselin (Tutor of) v. Quebec (Attorney General) (2005).

== Interpretation ==
In the case Adler v. Ontario (1996) religious freedoms under sections 2 and 15 of the Charter were used to argue that lack of government funding for Jewish Canadian schools and certain Christian schools in Ontario was unconstitutional, since by contrast Catholic schools received government money. The majority of the Supreme Court, however, dismissed the argument, noting section 93's importance as an agreement made between the founders of the nation to make Confederation possible. Since it was a political deal and not based upon the principle of freedom, section 2 of the Charter could not extend section 93 rights to other religions. Moreover, to find that section 2 could extend denominational school rights would contradict the specificity of section 93, and section 29 indicates such a contradiction cannot exist and that denominational schools are not Charter issues.

In Mahe v. Alberta, the Court found that minority language rights of French Canadians in Alberta required that the French community be represented on the school board. While this seemed to border on altering denominational school rights and raised section 29 concerns, since the school board in this case was a religious one, the Court justified it since the religious content of the education was unchanged, and the powers of the school board were merely "regulated" so that the religious teachings could be provided in French.
