= École J. H. Picard School =

K-12 school in Edmonton, Alberta (est. 1972)

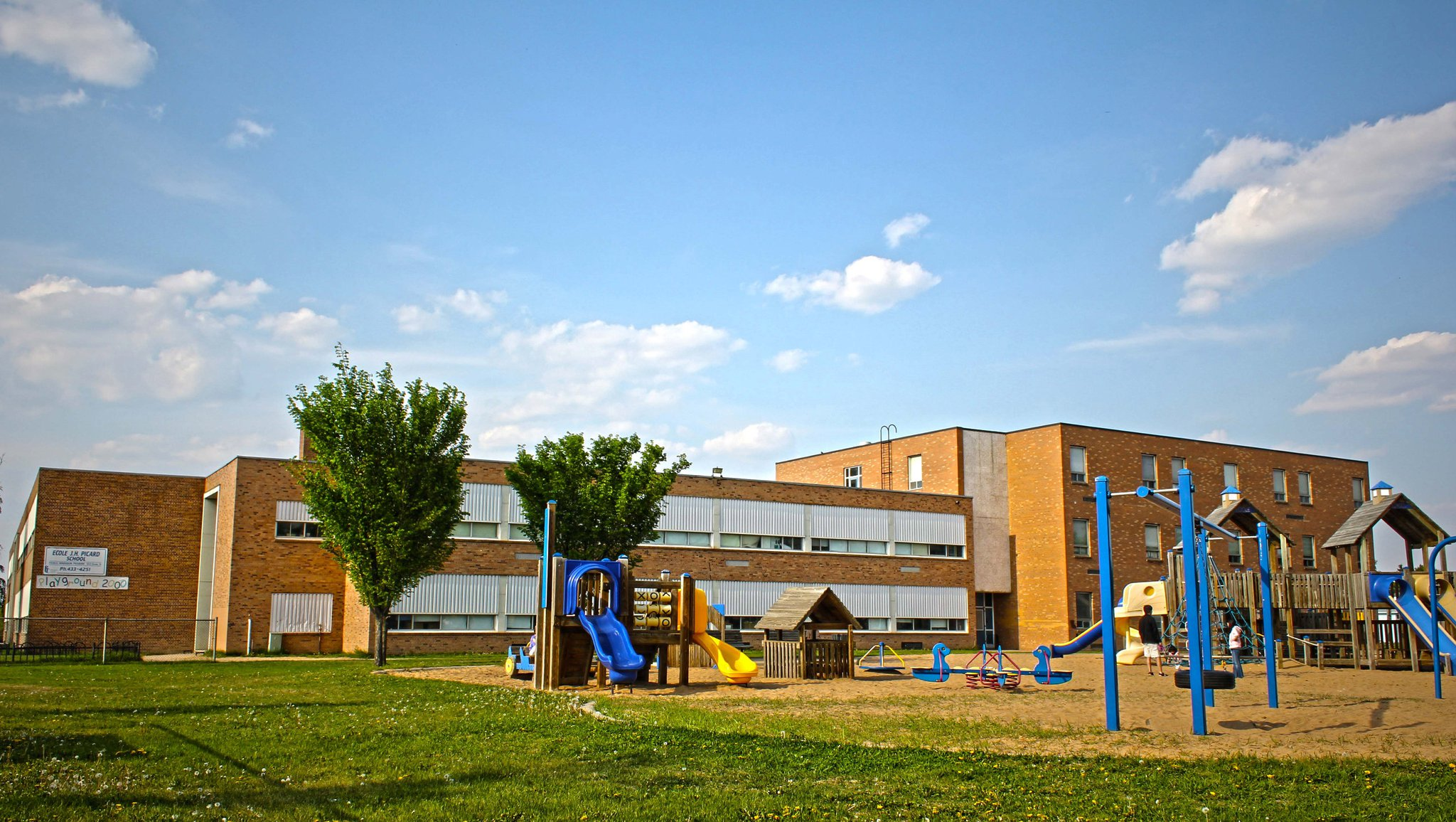

Location
- 7055 99 Street NW; Edmonton, Alberta, T6E 3R4; Canada
- Coordinates: 53°30′27″N 113°29′07″W

Information
- School type: Elementary/junior/senior high
- Motto: "we are family"
- Religious affiliation: Roman Catholic
- Founded: 1972
- School board: Edmonton Catholic School District
- Superintendent: Lynnette Anderson
- Area trustee: Alene Mutala
- Principal: Cindy Dallaire
- Grades: K-12
- Language: English, French immersion
- Area: Hazeldean
- Website: www.jhpicard.ecsd.net

École J.H. Picard School is a K–12 school located in Edmonton, Alberta, Canada. It is presently the only Catholic school in Western Canada that provides French Immersion education from kindergarten to grade 12.

== History ==
The school is named after Joseph Henri Picard, a francophone politician from Edmonton. It was officially opened on September 9, 1973 at a cost of $1.2 million. The school was built to consolidate the students previously attending l'Académie Assomption, a private girls school originally run by the Sisters of the Assumption, and College St. Jean for boys into a co-ed environment. The original location of the school was 8828 95 Street in the Bonnie Doon community, not far from Campus Saint Jean and Edmonton's French Quarter. Many dignitaries attended the official opening of the school including Archbishop Anthony Jordan; Lou Hyndman Minister of Education; Julian Koziak, MLA, Edmonton-Strathcona; Ivor Dent, Mayor of the City of Edmonton; and Lt. Governor Grant MacEwan. The school remained at that location until 1984, when it moved to a much larger facility, the former St. Mary's high School, at 7055 99 St NW. The original, smaller facility of Picard became École Maurice-Lavallée.

A CBC radio documentary in 1988 profiled francophone parents whose children attended the school:

"Basically our students are going to a school designed by and for English speaking people," said Francophone parent Frank McMann." As a result they're getting a second class education."

This situation was resolved with the creation of the Greater North Central Francophone Education Region No. 2, a distinct francophone board, following the 1990 Mahe v Alberta court case.

In 2000, the parents' council for J.H. Picard helped fund the building of a new playground.

As early as the late 1990s J.H. Picard was placed on a list for a major modernization which would have included a completely updated theater space. In 2011, the Edmonton Catholic School District (ECSD) Board of trustees decided to place J.H. Picard as the number one priority for relocation on their capital plan. The plan would have entailed relocation of the junior and senior high school to the Silverberry district of south east Edmonton. The new location would have shared a property with the adjacent Meadows Community Recreation Center as well with a possible new Edmonton Public Schools high school. Due to pressure from the then current parents committee, the Catholic School trustee board shelved the relocation plan.

In 2014, the Edmonton Catholic School board approved and commenced construction of the modernization of the 99th Street site, which temporarily displaced the elementary grades to across the field at the former St. Margaret school building. Construction was completed in February 2017. Renovations included an expansion of the parking lot, a new sound and recording studio, and a newly renovated Drama instruction and rehearsal space.

== Present ==
The École J.H. Picard School is now an arts academy with an emphasis on the fine arts and performing arts. The drama program has put on numerous productions, including Othello, Annie, West Side Story, and for the first time in its history put on a Jr.High Production: the Lion King. Productions stalled briefly due to the COVID-19 pandemic which affected the 2019–2020 and 2020–2021 school years. They restarted with a production of The Curious Incident of the Dog in the Nighttime. The students operate an in-house daily broadcast call JHPTV and school social media and email accounts to replace the monthly newsletter "The Picardien."

The school continues to field sports teams in junior and senior high, participating in soccer, volleyball, basketball, and track and field. The school sports teams are known as the Pumas.
