= École Maurice-Lavallée =

10-12 school in Edmonton, Alberta (est. 1984)

Location
- 8828 - 95 Street NW; Edmonton, Alberta, T6C 4H9; Canada
- Coordinates: 53.52505°N 113.47311°W

Information
- School type: Catholic francophone
- Motto: L'école secondaire de 1er choix!
- Founded: 1984
- School board: Conseil scolaire Centre-Nord
- Superintendent: Robert Lessard
- Principal: Marie-Claude Laroche
- Grades: 10-12
- Enrollment: 241 (September 2011)
- Language: French
- Team name: Jaguars
- Website: www.ml.centrenord.ab.ca

École Maurice-Lavallée is a high school in the Bonnie Doon neighbourhood of south-central Edmonton, Alberta, Canada. It provides Catholic francophone education to Grade 10-12 students.

== School history ==
École Maurice-Lavallée is the first publicly funded francophone school in Edmonton. Its official inauguration occurred on November 27, 1984. During its 12 years prior, École Maurice-Lavallée was operated by Edmonton Catholic Schools and was then called École J. H. Picard School. In 1994, the school became one of five schools to come under the authority of the Conseil scolaire Centre-Nord (Greater North Central Francophone Education Region No. 2). Since its inception, the school has seen many changes in its grade configuration. As of September 2009, École Maurice-Lavallée is a francophone senior high school (grades 10-12) the first of this type in Western Canada.

== Francophone schools ==
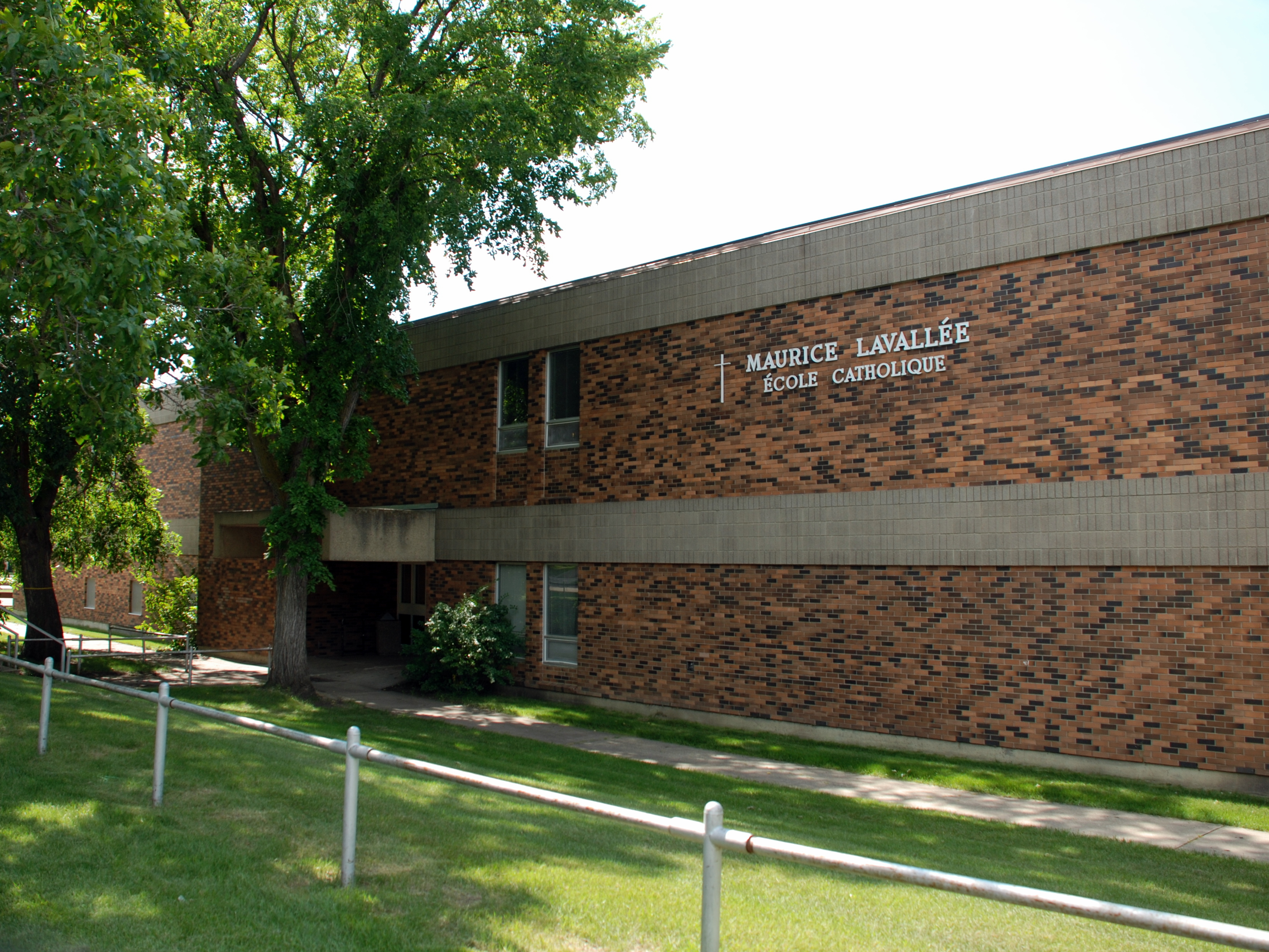
École Maurice-Lavallée

According to Section 23 of the Canadian Charter of Rights and Freedoms, parents whose first language is French have a constitutional right to have their child educated in French where there are enough students to warrant it. They also have the right to govern such schools. There are four francophone school authorities operating 34 schools in Alberta.

The educational needs of francophone students, of their families and their communities, the expected outcomes for francophone education and the conditions that must be met to ensure these outcomes are achieved, are found in the Alberta Education's document Affirming Francophone Education (link in External links section).

== Academic program ==
Alberta Education develops the Program of Studies (link in External links section) in French for Kindergarten to Grade 12 students in francophone programs. All courses, except for English language arts beginning in grade 3, are offered entirely in French.

Students who satisfy the requirements of the Alberta High School Diploma, study in French, and take Français 30-1 or Français 30-2 are awarded an Alberta High School Diploma (French First Language – Francophone).

Students who are enrolled in Knowledge and Employability courses who satisfy the requirements are awarded a Certificate of High School Achievement (French First Language – Francophone).

The school also has a Distributed Learning Centre with computers providing access to online courses as well as access to accredited teachers for support.

== Optional courses ==
Robotics, Construction, Welding, Instrumental Music, Physical Education, Drama, Culinary Arts, Visual Arts, Law, Information technology, Multimedia, Fashion, Hairdressing and Spanish.

== Sports ==
Volleyball, Soccer, Golf, Track and Field, Cross country running, Skiing, Swimming, Badminton, Basketball, Hiking, Camping, Intramural sports and Football (with Austin O'Brien High School).

== Extracurricular activities ==
International excursions, International missionary trips, Student council, Jazz band, School choir, Drama club, participation in provincial rallies, drama and music festivals, provincial francophone parliamentary debate, provincial francophone youth games, spiritual retreats, social justice projects, Forum for Young Canadians, Shad Valley, etc.

== See also ==
- Conseil scolaire Centre-Nord
