= Conseil scolaire francophone de la Colombie-Britannique =

School board in British Columbia, Canada

Location
- 13511 Commerce Parkway, Richmond (Head office) British Columbia Canada
- Coordinates: 49.173313°N 123.072253°W

District information
- Established: 1995
- Superintendent: Pascale Bernier
- Schools: 47 schools
- Budget: CA$175.4 million for the school year 2023–24

Students and staff
- Students: 6 300
- Staff: 1200

Other information
- Website: www.csf.bc.ca

The Conseil scolaire francophone de la Colombie-Britannique (also known as Francophone Education Authority or School District No 93) is the French-language public school board for all French schools located in British Columbia. Its headquarters are in Richmond in Greater Vancouver. Unlike the other school boards in British Columbia, this school board does not cover a specific geographic area, but instead takes ownership of schools based solely on language.

The school board helps ensure those with constitutional rights to minority language education under section 23 of the Canadian Charter of Rights and Freedoms receive it.

The Conseil scolaire francophone de la Colombie-Britannique offers educational programs and services geared towards the growth and cultural promotion of the province's Francophone learners. An active partner in the development of British Columbia's Francophone community, the Conseil has presently in its system, and distributed across 78 communities in the province, over 6,300 students and 46 schools. The school board also operates a French first language virtual school known as École Virtuelle.

== History ==
Public French schooling was established by the Government of British Columbia in 1977, known as the programme cadre de français. The program was managed by various English first language school boards in British Columbia.

In 1995, the provincial government established a French first language school board, known as the Francophone School Authority, providing French first language schooling for residents residing within the areas of Chilliwack and Victoria. As a result of a court action, in December 1997, the school board is given jurisdiction over the entire province. Legislation governing the regulations of the school board was passed in the Legislative Assembly of British Columbia on 27 March 1998. The legislation, including the components that expanded the school board's jurisdiction to cover the entire province, went into effect on 1 July 1999.

== Schools ==
School	Location	Grades	Dedicated facility (Note: Some schools operated by Conseil scolaire francophone de la Colombie-Britannique do not operate from a dedicated facility, with some institutions opting to use/share faculties with an area's local English school district.)
Annexe Queen Elizabeth	Vancouver	K–3	Yes
École André-Piolat	North Vancouver (district)	K–12	Yes
École Anne Hébert	Vancouver	K–6	Yes
École de l'Anse-au-sable	Kelowna	K–12	Yes
École Au-coeur-de-l'île	Comox Valley	K–12	Yes
École Beausoleil	Victoria	K–3	Yes
École du Bois-Joli	Delta	K–7	Yes
École des Cascades	Duncan	K–3	Yes
École des Colibris	Vancouver	K–6	Yes
École Collines d'or	Kamloops	K–7	No
École Côte du Soleil	Powell River	K–9	Yes
École des Deux-Rives	Mission	K–8	Yes
École Entre-Lacs	Penticton	K–8	No
École Franco-Nord	Prince George	K–7	Yes
École Gabrielle-Roy	Surrey	K–12	Yes
École des Glaciers	Revelstoke	K–6	No
École des Grands Cèdres	Port Alberni	K–7	Yes
École Jack-Cook	Terrace	K–7	Yes
École de Kimberley	Kimberley	K–7	Yes
École La Passerelle	Whistler	K–7	No
École La Vallée	Pemberton	K–7	No
École La Vérendrye	Chilliwack	K–7	Yes
École Les Aiglons	Squamish	K–7	Yes
École Mer-et-montagne	Campbell River	K–8	Yes
École des Navigateurs	Richmond	K–7	No
Ecole Norval-Morrisseau	Vancouver	K–3	Unknown
École Océane	Nanaimo	K–7	Yes (Note: École Océane and École secondaire de Nanaimo share the same building, although they are considered separate schools.)
École du Pacifique	Sechelt	K–7	Yes
École des Pionniers-de-Maillardville	Port Coquitlam	K–12	Yes
École Rose-des-Vents	Vancouver	K–6	Yes
École secondaire Brooks	Powell River	10–12	No
École secondaire Carihi	Campbell River	9–12	No
École secondaire Chatelech	Sechelt	8–12	No
École secondaire Duchess Park	Prince George	8–12	No
École secondaire Jules-Verne	Vancouver	7–12	Yes
École secondaire de Nanaimo	Nanaimo	K–7	Yes
École secondaire de Nelson	Nelson	9–11	No
École secondaire de Penticton	Penticton	8–12	Yes
École secondaire de Revelstoke	Revelstoke	8	No
École des Sentiers-Alpins	Nelson	K–8	Yes
École des Sept-Sommets	Rossland	K–7	Yes
École Sophie-Morigeau	Fernie	K–6	No
École Victor-Brodeur	Victoria	K–12	Yes
École des Voyageurs	Langley	K–7	Yes

== See also ==
- Franco-Columbian
- List of school districts in British Columbia
