= École publique Gabrielle-Roy =

K-6 school in Edmonton, Alberta (est. 1997)

Location
- 8728 - 93 Avenue NW; Edmonton, Alberta, T6C 1T8; Canada; 53°31′48″N 113°27′48″W

Information
- School type: Public francophone
- Motto: On est chez soi à Gabrielle-Roy
- Founded: 1997
- School board: Conseil scolaire Centre-Nord
- Superintendent: Robert Lessard
- Principal: Nathalie Viens
- Grades: K-6
- Enrollment: 250 (September 2016)
- Language: French
- Team name: Grizzlies
- Website: www.gr.centrenord.ab.ca

École publique Gabrielle-Roy is an elementary school in the Strathearn community of Edmonton, Alberta, Canada. It provides public francophone education to students from Kindergarten to grade 6. École Enfantine is a preschool program located within the school for children eligible for francophone education aged 3 and 4 years old. This playschool is operated by a parent committee and Fédération des Parents Francophones de l'Alberta. The school also houses a daycare and before and after-school care program called Centre d'expérience préscolaire et parascolaire.

== School history ==
École publique Gabrielle-Roy opened in 1997 with 25 students. It operated in a series of different northside locations, then in 2006 it moved to its present site.

In 2006-2007, enrolment increased by 55%. On September 30, 2012, the school had 343 K-12 students. By the 2015-2016 school year, the school's K-12 enrolment had grown to 460 students, stretching the limits of the school's capacity. To meet the growing demand, in 2016, the Conseil scolaire Centre-Nord reached an agreement with the Edmonton Catholic School Board to take over the former St. Kevin Junior High school in the nearby Forest Heights neighbourhood, and to move students from Grades 7-12 to this new school, which was renamed École publique Michaëlle-Jean. Grades K-6 remain at Gabrielle-Roy.

The school is named after the famous French-Canadian novelist and teacher Gabrielle Roy. She was born in Saint Boniface, Winnipeg (now part of Winnipeg), Manitoba in 1909 and is the author several internationally acclaimed novels, namely The Tin Flute (1947) that won the 1947 Governor General's Awards for fiction as well as the Royal Society of Canada's Lorne Pierce Medal.

== Francophone schools ==
According to Section 23 of the Canadian Charter of Rights and Freedoms, parents whose first language is French have a constitutional right to have their child educated in French where there are enough students to warrant it. They also have the right to govern these schools. There are four francophone school authorities operating 34 schools in Alberta.

The educational needs of francophone students, of their families and their communities, the expected outcomes for francophone education and the conditions that must be met to ensure these outcomes are achieved, are found in the Alberta Education's document Affirming Francophone Education (link in External links section).

== Academic program ==
Alberta Education develops the Program of Studies (link in External links section) in French for Kindergarten to Grade 12 students in Francophone programs. All courses, except for English language arts beginning in grade 3, are offered entirely in French.

== New school building announced ==
On March 1, 2023, the Conseil scolaire Centre-Nord announced that new funding from the provincial government would allow for the building of two new schools on the current site of École publique Gabrielle-Roy. One of these schools will be a replacement for the current Gabrielle-Roy K-6 elementary school, while the other will be a new facility to house the nearby Grade 7-12 École publique Michaëlle-Jean. Once the new schools are completed, the old elementary school building will be demolished.

== Sports ==
Basketball, Soccer, Curling, Badminton, Track and Field, Edmonton Journal Indoor Games and Skiing.

== Extracurricular activities ==
International and national trips, Ski trips, Camping, Intramural sports, Popular music groups, Student Council, etc.

== See also ==
- Conseil scolaire Centre-Nord
