= 2005 reasons of the Supreme Court of Canada =

The table below lists the reasons delivered from the bench by the Supreme Court of Canada during 2005. The table illustrates what reasons were filed by each justice in each case, and which justices joined each reason. This list, however, does not include decisions on motions.

== Reasons ==
Delivered the Court's reason
Joined the Court's reason
Filed a concurrence
Joined a concurrence
Filed a dissent
Joined a dissent
Filed a concurrence/dissent
Joined a concurrence/dissent
Did not participate in the judgment
Did not participate in the final disposition of the judgment
Not a member of the Court at the time of hearing or delivering
- Decisions that do not note a Justice delivering the Court's reason are per coram.
- Multiple concurrences and dissents within a case are numbered, with joining votes numbered accordingly. Justices occasionally join multiple reasons in a single case; each vote is subdivided accordingly.
- Multiple unnumbered reasons are jointly written or delivered.
- Decisions that are given orally from the bench are denoted by a "V"; per coram decisions delivered orally from the bench only note a "V" on the most senior justice on the panel.
- An asterisk ( * ) in the Court's opinion denotes that it was only a majority in part or a plurality.

| Case name | Argued | Decided | McLachlin | Major | Bastarache | Binnie | LeBel | Deschamps | Fish | Abella | Charron |
|---|---|---|---|---|---|---|---|---|---|---|---|
| British Columbia Hydro and Power Authority v British Columbia (Environmental Appeal Board), [2005] 1 S.C.R. 3; 2005 SCC 1 | January 20, 2005 | January 20, 2005 | V | | | | | | | | |
| R v Clark, [2005] 1 S.C.R. 6; 2005 SCC 2 | November 2, 2004 | January 27, 2005 | | | | | | | | | |
| R v Roberts, [2005] 1 S.C.R. 22; 2005 SCC 3 | December 15, 2004 | January 27, 2005 | | | | | | | | | |
| R v Ménard, [2005] 1 S.C.R. 24; 2005 SCC 4 | December 17, 2004 | January 27, 2005 | | | | | | | | | |
| R v Grandinetti, [2005] 1 S.C.R. 27; 2005 SCC 5 | October 15, 2004 | January 27, 2005 | | | | | | | | | |
| Marche v Halifax Insurance Co, [2005] 1 S.C.R. 47; 2005 SCC 6 | November 2, 2004 | February 24, 2005 | | | | | | | | | |
| R v Krymowski, [2005] 1 S.C.R. 101; 2005 SCC 7 | November 8, 2004 | February 24, 2005 | | | | | | | | | |
| Tsiaprailis v Canada, [2005] 1 S.C.R. 113; 2005 SCC 8 | November 4, 2004 | February 25, 2005 | | | | | | | | | |
| R v Decorte, [2005] 1 S.C.R. 133; 2005 SCC 9 | December 10, 2004 | February 25, 2005 | | | | | | | | | |
| UL Canada Inc v Quebec (AG), [2005] 1 S.C.R. 143; 2005 SCC 10 | March 17, 2005 | March 17, 2005 | | | | | V | | | | |
| Case name | Argued | Decided | McLachlin | Major | Bastarache | Binnie | LeBel | Deschamps | Fish | Abella | Charron |
| Vaughan v Canada, [2005] 1 S.C.R. 146; 2005 SCC 11 | May 18, 2004; January 7, 2005 | March 18, 2005 | | | | | | | | | |
| Nova Scotia (Minister of Health) v JJ, [2005] 1 S.C.R. 177; 2005 SCC 12 | November 4, 2004 | March 18, 2005 | | | | | | | | | |
| Rothmans, Benson & Hedges Inc v Saskatchewan, [2005] 1 S.C.R. 188; 2005 SCC 13 | January 19, 2005 | March 18, 2005 | | | | | | | | | |
| Solski (Tutor of) v Quebec (AG), [2005] 1 S.C.R. 201; 2005 SCC 14 | March 22, 2004 | March 31, 2005 | | | | | | | | | |
| Gosselin (Tutor of) v Quebec (AG), [2005] 1 S.C.R. 238; 2005 SCC 15 | March 22, 2004 | March 31, 2005 | | | | | | | | | |
| Okwuobi v Lester B Pearson School Board, [2005] 1 S.C.R. 257; 2005 SCC 16 | March 22, 2004 | March 31, 2005 | | | | | | | | | |
| R v RGL, [2005] 1 S.C.R. 288; 2005 SCC 18 | February 11, 2005 | April 14, 2005 | | | | | | | | | |
| R v PEC, [2005] 1 S.C.R. 290; 2005 SCC 19 | April 19, 2005 | April 19, 2005 | | | | | | | | | V |
| Fédération des producteurs de volailles du Québec v Pelland, [2005] 1 S.C.R. 292; 2005 SCC 20 | December 9, 2004 | April 21, 2005 | | | | | | | | | |
| Gladstone v Canada (AG), [2005] 1 S.C.R. 325; 2005 SCC 21 | February 9, 2005 | April 21, 2005 | | | | | | | | | |
| Case name | Argued | Decided | McLachlin | Major | Bastarache | Binnie | LeBel | Deschamps | Fish | Abella | Charron |
| R v Paice, [2005] 1 S.C.R. 339; 2005 SCC 22 | December 15, 2004 | April 22, 2005 | | | | | | | | | |
| R v Mapara, [2005] 1 S.C.R. 358; 2005 SCC 23 | December 16, 2004 | April 27, 2005 | | | | | | | | | |
| R v Chow, [2005] 1 S.C.R. 384; 2005 SCC 24 | December 16, 2004 | April 27, 2005 | | | | | | | | | |
| HL v Canada (AG), [2005] 1 S.C.R. 401; 2005 SCC 25 | May 13/December 13, 2004 | April 29, 2005 | | | 1 | | 1 | 1 | | | 2 |
| Bristol-Myers Squibb Co v Canada (AG), [2005] 1 S.C.R. 533; 2005 SCC 26 | November 5, 2004 | May 19, 2005 | | | | | | | | | |
| R v Gunning, [2005] 1 S.C.R. 627; 2005 SCC 27 | February 15, 2005 | May 19, 2005 | | | | | | | | | |
| Prebushewski v Dodge City Auto (1984) Ltd, [2005] 1 S.C.R. 649; 2005 SCC 28 | March 9, 2005 | May 19, 2005 | | | | | | | | | |
| R v Dionne, [2005] 1 S.C.R. 665; 2005 SCC 29 | May 19, 2005 | May 19, 2005 | | | | | | | V | | |
| Canada (House of Commons) v Vaid, [2005] 1 S.C.R. 667; 2005 SCC 30 | October 13, 2004 | May 20, 2005 | | | | | | | | | |
| Glegg v Smith & Nephew Inc, [2005] 1 S.C.R. 724; 2005 SCC 31 | January 13, 2005 | May 20, 2005 | | | | | | | | | |
| Case name | Argued | Decided | McLachlin | Major | Bastarache | Binnie | LeBel | Deschamps | Fish | Abella | Charron |
| R v Fice, [2005] 1 S.C.R. 742; 2005 SCC 32 | January 13, 2005 | May 20, 2005 | | | | | | | | | |
| Royal Bank of Canada v State Farm Fire and Casualty Co, [2005] 1 S.C.R. 779; 2005 SCC 34 | April 13, 2005 | June 9, 2005 | | | | | | | | | |
| Chaoulli v Quebec (AG), [2005] 1 S.C.R. 791; 2005 SCC 35 | June 8, 2004 | June 9, 2005 | | | | | | | | | |
| R v Stender, [2005] 1 S.C.R. 914; 2005 SCC 36 | June 10, 2005 | June 10, 2005 | | | | | | | V | | |
| R v Orbanski; R v Elias, [2005] 2 S.C.R. 3; 2005 SCC 37 | October 12, 2004 | June 16, 2005 | | | | | | | | | |
| Ryan v Moore, [2005] 2 S.C.R. 53; 2005 SCC 38 | December 7, 2004 | June 16, 2005 | | | | | | | | | |
| Mugesera v Canada (Minister of Citizenship and Immigration), [2005] 2 S.C.R. 100; 2005 SCC 40 | December 8, 2004 | June 28, 2005 | | | | | | | | | |
| Toronto Star Newspapers Ltd v Ontario, [2005] 2 S.C.R. 188; 2005 SCC 41 | February 9, 2005 | June 29, 2005 | | | | | | | | | |
| R v Woods, [2005] 2 S.C.R. 205; 2005 SCC 42 | May 11, 2005 | June 29, 2005 | | | | | | | | | |
| R v Marshall; R v Bernard, [2005] 2 S.C.R. 220; 2005 SCC 43 | January 17, 18, 2005 | July 20, 2005 | | | | | | | | | |
| Case name | Argued | Decided | McLachlin | Major | Bastarache | Binnie | LeBel | Deschamps | Fish | Abella | Charron |
| Provincial Court Judges' Assn of New Brunswick v New Brunswick (Minister of Justice), [2005] 2 S.C.R. 286; 2005 SCC 44 | November 9, 10, 2004 | July 22, 2005 | | | | | | | | | |
| R v GR, [2005] 2 S.C.R. 371; 2005 SCC 45 | December 17, 2004 | July 22, 2005 | | | | | | | | | |
| GreCon Dimter inc v J R Normand inc, [2005] 2 S.C.R. 401; 2005 SCC 46 | February 10, 2005 | July 22, 2005 | | | | | | | | | |
| R v Hamilton, [2005] 2 S.C.R. 432; 2005 SCC 47 | January 14, 2005 | June 29, 2005 | | | | | | | | | |
| British Columbia v Imperial Tobacco Canada Ltd, [2005] 2 S.C.R. 473; 2005 SCC 49 | June 8, 2005 | September 29, 2005 | | | | | | | | | |
| R v Turcotte, [2005] 2 S.C.R. 519; 2005 SCC 50 | May 10, 2005 | September 30, 2005 | | | | | | | | | |
| Medovarski v Canada (Minister of Citizenship and Immigration); Esteban v. Canada (Minister of Citizenship and Immigration), [2005] 2 S.C.R. 539; 2005 SCC 51 | June 7, 2005 | September 30, 2005 | | | | | | | | | |
| DIMS Construction inc (Trustee of) v Quebec (AG), [2005] 2 S.C.R. 564; 2005 SCC 52 | December 8, 2004 | October 6, 2005 | | | | | | | | | |
| Moufarrège v Quebec (Deputy Minister of Revenue), [2005] 2 S.C.R. 598; 2005 SCC 53 | October 12, 2005 | October 12, 2005 | | | | | | V | | | |
| Canada Trustco Mortgage Co v Canada, [2005] 2 S.C.R. 601; 2005 SCC 54 | March 8, 2005 | October 19, 2005 | | | | | | | | | |
| Case name | Argued | Decided | McLachlin | Major | Bastarache | Binnie | LeBel | Deschamps | Fish | Abella | Charron |
| Mathew v Canada, [2005] 2 S.C.R. 643; 2005 SCC 55 | March 8, 2005 | October 19, 2005 | | | | | | | | | |
| Reference Re Employment Insurance Act (Can), ss 22 and 23, [2005] 2 S.C.R. 669; 2005 SCC 56 | January 11, 2005 | October 20, 2005 | | | | | | | | | |
| Hilewitz v Canada (Minister of Citizenship and Immigration); De Jong v Canada (Minister of Citizenship and Immigration), [2005] 2 S.C.R. 706; 2005 SCC 57 | February 8, 2005 | October 21, 2005 | | | | | | | | | |
| Blackwater v Plint, [2005] 3 S.C.R. 3; 2005 SCC 58 | May 16, 2005 | October 21, 2005 | | | | | | | | | |
| EB v Order of the Oblates of Mary Immaculate in the Province of British Columbia, [2005] 3 S.C.R. 45; 2005 SCC 60 | December 7, 2004 | October 28, 2005 | | | | | | | | | |
| R v RC, [2005] 3 S.C.R. 99; 2005 SCC 61 | April 20, 2005 | October 28, 2005 | | | 2 | | 1 | | | 1 | 1 |
| Montréal (City of) v 2952-1366 Québec Inc, [2005] 3 S.C.R. 141; 2005 SCC 62 | October 14, 2004 | November 3, 2005 | | | | | | | | | |
| Contino v Leonelli-Contino, [2005] 3 S.C.R. 217; 2005 SCC 63 | January 14, 2005 | November 10, 2005 | | | | | | | | | |
| Boucher v Stelco Inc, [2005] 3 S.C.R. 279; 2005 SCC 64 | June 10, 2005 | November 10, 2005 | | | | | | | | | |
| Kirkbi AG v Ritvik Holdings Inc, [2005] 3 S.C.R. 302; 2005 SCC 65 | March 16, 2005 | November 17, 2005 | | | | | | | | | |
| Case name | Argued | Decided | McLachlin | Major | Bastarache | Binnie | LeBel | Deschamps | Fish | Abella | Charron |
| R v Pires; R v Lising, [2005] 3 S.C.R. 343; 2005 SCC 66 | May 18, 2005 | November 17, 2005 | | | | | | | | | |
| R v Rodrigue, [2005] 3 S.C.R. 384; 2005 SCC 67 | November 17, 2005 | November 17, 2005 | | | V | | | | | | |
| R v Escobar-Benavidez, [2005] 3 S.C.R. 386; 2005 SCC 68 | November 18, 2005 | November 18, 2005 | V | | | | | | | | |
| Mikisew Cree First Nation v Canada (Minister of Canadian Heritage), [2005] 3 S.C.R. 388; 2005 SCC 69 | March 14, 2005 | November 24, 2005 | | | | | | | | | |
| Merk v International Association of Bridge, Structural, Ornamental and Reinforcing Iron Workers, Local 771, [2005] 3 S.C.R. 425; 2005 SCC 70 | February 10, 2005 | November 24, 2005 | | | | | | | | | |
| R v Spence, [2005] 3 S.C.R. 458; 2005 SCC 71 | June 9, 2005 | December 2, 2005 | | | | | | | | | |
| R v Boucher, [2005] 3 S.C.R. 499; 2005 SCC 72 | May 10, 2005 | December 2, 2005 | | | | | | | | | |
| Dikranian v Quebec (AG), [2005] 3 S.C.R. 530; 2005 SCC 73 | March 10, 2005 | December 2, 2005 | | | | | | | | | |
| Charlebois v Saint John (City of), [2005] 3 S.C.R. 563; 2005 SCC 74 | October 20, 2005 | December 15, 2005 | | | | | | | | | |
| R v MacKay, [2005] 3 S.C.R. 607; 2005 SCC 75 | December 14, 2005 | December 14, 2005 | V | | | | | | | | |
| Case name | Argued | Decided | McLachlin | Major | Bastarache | Binnie | LeBel | Deschamps | Fish | Abella | Charron |
| R v Henry, [2005] 3 S.C.R. 609; 2005 SCC 76 | April 23, 2004/January 12, 2005 | December 15, 2005 | | | | | | | | | |
| Zenner v Prince Edward Island College of Optometrists, [2005] 3 S.C.R. 645; 2005 SCC 77 | November 9, 2005 | December 16, 2005 | | | | | | | | | |
| R v CD; R v CDK, [2005] 3 S.C.R. 668; 2005 SCC 78 | April 14, 2005 | December 16, 2005 | | | | | | | | | |
| R v MacKay, [2005] 3 S.C.R. 725; 2005 SCC 79 | December 15, 2005 | December 15, 2005 | | | | | | | | | V |
| R v Labaye, [2005] 3 S.C.R. 728; 2005 SCC 80 | April 18, 2005 | December 21, 2005 | | | | | | | | | |
| R v Kouri, [2005] 3 S.C.R. 789; 2005 SCC 81 | April 18, 2005 | December 21, 2005 | | | | | | | | | |
| May v Ferndale Institution, [2005] 3 S.C.R. 809; 2005 SCC 82 | May 17, 2005 | December 22, 2005 | | | | | | | | | |
| Castillo v Castillo, [2005] 3 S.C.R. 870; 2005 SCC 83 | November 16, 2005 | December 22, 2005 | | | | | | | | | |
| R v Wiles, [2005] 3 S.C.R. 895; 2005 SCC 84 | October 11, 2005 | December 22, 2005 | | | | | | | | | |

== Individual statistics ==
| Justice | Reasons written | Votes cast | % Majority |
|---|---|---|---|
| Chief Justice Beverley McLachlin | 14 / 1 / 0 / 0 / Total=15 | 53 / 0 / 0 / 1 / Total=54 | 68 out of 69 (98.5%) |
| Puisne Justice John C. Major | 10 / 1 / 0 / 0 / Total=11 | 50 / 0 / 0 / 3 / Total=53 | 61 out of 64 (95.3%) |
| Puisne Justice Michel Bastarache | 8 / 0 / 0 / 7 / Total=15 | 53 / 1 / 0 / 2 / Total=56 | 62 out or 81 (76.5%) |
| Puisne Justice Ian Binnie | 10 / 0 / 0 / 2 / Total=12 | 61 / 0 / 0 / 2 / Total=63 | 71 out of 75 (94.7%) |
| Puisne Justice Louis LeBel | 7 / 3 / 1 / 3 / Total=14 | 55 / 0 / 0 / 7 / Total=62 | 65 out of 76 (85.5%) |
| Puisne Justice Marie Deschamps | 6 / 0 / 0 / 3 / Total=09 | 62 / 0 / 0 / 4 / Total=66 | 68 out of 75 (90.7%) |
| Puisne Justice Morris Fish | 11 / 1 / 0 / 3 / Total=15 | 53 / 2 / 1 / 2 / Total=58 | 67 out of 73 (91.8%) |
| Puisne Justice Rosalie Abella | 6 / 0 / 0 / 4 / Total=10 | 59 / 0 / 0 / 1 / Total=60 | 65 out of 70 (92.9%) |
| Puisne Justice Louise Charron | 11 / 0 / 0 / 4 / Total=15 | 54 / 0 / 0 / 3 / Total=57 | 65 out of 72 (90.3%) |
Notes on statistics: A justice is only included in the majority if they have joined or concurred in the Court's judgment in full. Percentages are based only on the cases in which a justice participated, and are rounded to the nearest tenth of a percent.
