= École À la Découverte =

Location
- 17610 - 104 Street NW; Edmonton, Alberta, T5X 5X3; Canada; 53°38′28″N 113°30′13″W

Information
- School type: Public francophone
- Motto: L'aventure commence ici!
- Founded: 2007
- School board: Conseil scolaire Centre-Nord
- Superintendent: Robert Lessard
- Principal: Serge Afana
- Grades: K-9
- Enrollment: 72 (September 2012)
- Language: French
- Website: www.ld.centrenord.ab.ca

École À la Découverte is an elementary school in the Elsinore neighbourhood of Edmonton, Alberta, Canada. It provides public francophone education to students from Kindergarten to grade 9.

== School history ==
In 2007, Conseil scolaire Centre-Nord (Greater North Central Francophone Education Region No. 2) opened its 12th school, École publique du Nord, the Authority's second francophone public school in Edmonton. For four years, the school operated in leased space at St. Patrick School (Edmonton Catholic Schools). In March 2009, the school was renamed École À la Découverte. In Fall 2011, the school was relocated in leased space at Kensington Schools, and in September 2016 it opened in its current location, the former Queen Mary Park Elementary School. (Edmonton Public Schools).

== Francophone schools ==
According to Section 23 of the Canadian Charter of Rights and Freedoms, parents whose first language is French have a constitutional right to have their child educated in French where there are enough students to warrant it. They also have the right to govern these schools. There are four francophone school authorities operating 34 schools in Alberta.

The educational needs of francophone students, of their families and their communities, the expected outcomes for francophone education and the conditions that must be met to ensure these outcomes are achieved, are found in Alberta Education's document Affirming Francophone Education (link in External links section).

== Academic program ==
Alberta Education develops the Program of Studies (link in External links section) in French for Kindergarten to Grade 12 students in Francophone programs. All courses, except for English language arts beginning in grade 3, are offered entirely in French.

Students who satisfy the requirements of the Alberta High School Diploma, study in French and take Français 30-1 or Français 30-2, are awarded an Alberta High School Diploma (French First Language – Francophone).

== See also ==
- Conseil scolaire Centre-Nord
