= Canada Clause =

Canada Clause may refer to:

- Article 2 of the North Atlantic Treaty, 1949
- Section 23 of the Canadian Charter of Rights and Freedoms, 1982
- A clause in the proposed Charlottetown Accord, 1992
