= Pionnier =

Pionnier, "pioneer" in French, may refer to:

- Foreign Legion Pioneers (Pionniers), a French military unit
- Laurent Pionnier (born 1982), French footballer
- Pau FC, nicknamed Les Pionniers, a French association football club
- Pionniers de Chamonix-Mont Blanc, a French ice hockey team
- Les Pionniers (rugby league), the first French rugby league team

== See also ==
- École des Pionniers (disambiguation)
