= Arsenault-Cameron v Prince Edward Island =

- Supreme Court of Canada

Hearing: November 4, 1999 Judgment: January 13, 2000
- Full case name: Noëlla Arsenault-Cameron, Madeleine Costa-Petitpas and the Fédération des Parents de l'Île-du-Prince-Édouard Inc. v. The Government of Prince Edward Island
- Citations: [2000] 1 S.C.R. 3, 2000 SCC 1
- Docket No.: 26682
- Prior history: Judgment for the Government of Prince Edward Island in the Supreme Court of Prince Edward Island, Appeal Division.
- Ruling: Appeal allowed.

Holding
- Section 23 of the Canadian Charter of Rights and Freedoms requires education to be provided for a province's minority official language when the number of students warrants it. A comprehensive review of various factors are required to make that determination, and should not be restrictive.

Court membership
- Chief Justice: Antonio Lamer; Puisne Justices: Claire L'Heureux-Dubé, Charles Gonthier, Beverley McLachlin, Frank Iacobucci, John C. Major, Michel Bastarache, Ian Binnie, Louise Arbour

Reasons given
- Unanimous reasons by: Major and Bastarache JJ.

Arsenault-Cameron v Prince Edward Island, [2000] 1 S.C.R. 3, 2000 SCC 1, is a landmark Supreme Court of Canada decision on minority language rights. The Court found that the numbers of Francophone children in Summerside, Prince Edward Island warranted French-language education in Summerside, under section 23 of the Canadian Charter of Rights and Freedoms, and the province was constitutionally obligated to create a French language school.

== Background ==
A number of Francophone families living in Summerside made a request to the French Language Board to build a French-language school in the community rather than bus the children to the closest French school 57 minutes away. The Board made a proposal to the Minister, which was rejected.

The family applied for a declaration against the province to build a school in Summerside. At trial, the declaration was granted, but was overturned on appeal.

In the decision of Arsenault-Cameron v. Prince Edward Island, [1999] 3 S.C.R. 851, prior to the language rights hearing, the counsel for the government sought to have Bastarache recuse himself for reasonable apprehension of bias due to his history of championing the French language. In an application to Bastarache, he held that he was not biased to hear the case, and so did not recuse himself.

== Opinion of the Court ==
Major and Bastarache, writing for a unanimous court, applied a purposive interpretation to section 23 of the Charter. He found that the purpose of the right is to redress past injustices and provide "an official language minority with equal access to high quality education in its own language in circumstances where community development will be enhanced."

== See also ==
- List of Supreme Court of Canada cases (McLachlin Court)
