= Greater North Central Francophone Education Region No. 2 =

School district in Alberta, Canada

Greater North Central Francophone Education Region No. 2 Conseil scolaire Centre-Nord

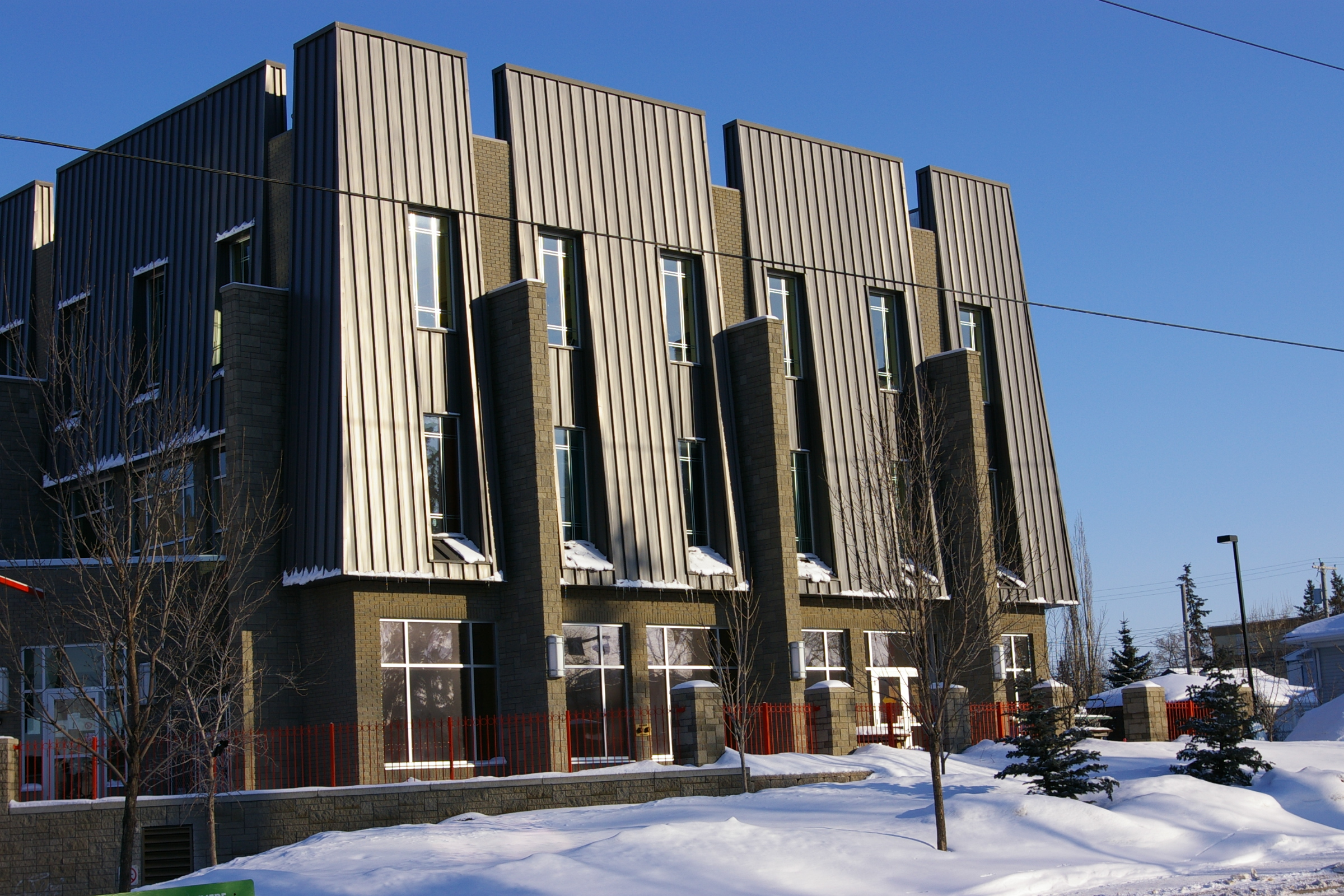
- Greater North Central Francophone Education Region No. 2 office

Address
- Suite 322; 8627 – 91 Street NW; Edmonton, Alberta, Canada Beaumont, Camrose, Edmonton, Fort McMurray, Jasper, Legal, Lloydminster, Red Deer, St. Albert, Sherwood Park, Wainwright Canada
- Coordinates: 53.522758°N 113.467484°W

District information
- Superintendent: Robert Lessard
- Chair of the board: Steve Daigle
- Schools: 20
- Budget: CA$56 million (2017–2018)

Students and staff
- Students: 3368 (September 2017)
- Teachers: 230
- Staff: 135

Other information
- Elected trustees: Steve Daigle (catholic); Tanya Saumure (public); Giscard Kodiane (catholic); Jean-Daniel Tremblay (public); Étienne Alary (catholic); Ismail Osman-Hachi (public)
- Website: centrenord.ab.ca

The Greater North Central Francophone Education Region No. 2, known in French as the Conseil scolaire Centre-Nord (CSCN), is one of Alberta's four French language school boards. French language education is intended for children who are eligible under section 23 of the Canadian Charter of Rights and Freedoms. The CSCN is a composite board, operating both public and catholic francophone schools in Beaumont, Camrose, Edmonton, Fort McMurray, Jasper, Legal, Lloydminster, Red Deer, Sherwood Park, St. Albert. Stony Plain and Wainwright. The CSCN receives funding for all students from the provincial Government of Alberta.

== History ==
In 1993, the Government of Alberta adopted a bill amending the School Act to comply with Mahe v. Alberta (1990), a leading Supreme Court of Canada decision on the minority language education rights under section 23 of the Canadian Charter of Rights and Freedoms. The district was created in 1994 under section 223.3 of the School Act under the name Regional Authority of the North Central Francophone Education Region No. 4 (since changed to Greater North Central Francophone Education Region No. 2). It is one of four French school boards in Alberta.

== Governance ==
According to the School Act (2001), the seven members of the Board of Trustees are elected to represent francophone communities in central and northern Alberta. The composite regional Authority's mandate is to protect the linguistic and confessional rights of section 23 holders.

The CSCN updates its list of electors by carrying out a census, as required. Results of the census determine the proportion of Public school Trustees and Catholic school Trustees to be elected to the Board. The Catholic trustees constitute a separate entity – Conseil scolaire catholique Centre-Nord – according to section 255.4 of the School Act (2001). Based on the 2011 census, there are two Public school trustees and five Catholic school trustees.

== Size ==
In 2016–2017 school year, there were approximately 3,200 students attending 19 schools in total: 9 elementary schools, 1 elementary/junior high school, 1 junior high school, 2 junior/senior high school, 5 elementary/junior/senior high schools, and 1 senior high school.

The CSCN employs approximately 350 teachers and professionals.

A twentieth school, an elementary school, opened in Stony Plain in 2022.

== Schools ==
Name	Public/Catholic	Address	City/Town	Grades
École À la Découverte	Public	10935 – 113 Street NW	Edmonton	K-9
École Alexandre-Taché	Catholic	30 Erin Ridge Drive	St. Albert	5–12
École Boréale	Catholic	312 Abasand Drive	Fort McMurray	K-12
École Citadelle	Catholic	5204 – 46 Street	Legal	K-9
École Claudette-et-Denis-Tardif	Public	10 Hawkins Crescent	Sherwood Park	K-8
École des Fondateurs	Public	4707 – 56 Street	Camrose	K-12
École Desrochers	Public	302 Elm Avenue	Jasper	K-12
École La Trinité	To be determined	5116 55th Avenue	Stony Plain	K-6
École Joseph-Moreau	Catholic	9750 – 74 Avenue NW	Edmonton	7–9
École La Mission	Catholic	46 Heritage Drive	St. Albert	K-4
École La Prairie	Catholic	4810 – 34 Street	Red Deer	K-12
École Maurice-Lavallée	Catholic	8828 – 95 Street NW	Edmonton	10–12
École Michaëlle-Jean	Public	10005 – 84 Street NW	Edmonton	7–12
École Notre-Dame	Catholic	15425 – 91 Avenue NW	Edmonton	K-6
École Père-Lacombe	Catholic	10715 – 131A Avenue NW	Edmonton	K-6
École publique Gabrielle-Roy	Public	8728 – 93 Avenue NW	Edmonton	K-6
École Saint-Christophe	Catholic	214 – 8 Street	Wainwright	K-12
École Quatre-Saisons	Catholic	5505 – Magasin Avenue	Beaumont	K-6
École Sainte-Jeanne-d’Arc	Catholic	8505 – 68A Street NW	Edmonton	K-6
École Sans-Frontières	Public	4204 – 54 Avenue	Lloydminster	K-12

== See also ==
- List of Alberta school boards
