= School District 47 Powell River =

School district in British Columbia, Canada

qathet School District - School District 47

Location
- Powell River Powell River, Texada Island in Metro/Coast Canada
- Coordinates: 49.8338°N 124.5154°W (Admin building)

District information
- Superintendent: Paul McKenzie
- Schools: 9
- Budget: CA$20.2 million

Students and staff
- Students: 2537

Other information
- Website: www.sd47.bc.ca

qathet School District - School District 47 (formerly Powell River Board of Education) is a school district in British Columbia that is situated on the northern tip of the Sunshine Coast in the qathet Regional District. It provides public education to approximately 3,000 students in six elementary schools (Grades K-7), one secondary school (Grades 8-12), an alternate school and a Distributed Learning Program to support home-learning families called Partners in Education (PIE).

SD47 has an elected board of five school trustees - Jaclyn Miller (Chairperson), Maureen Mason (Vice-Chairperson), Gretchen Conti (Trustee), Kirsten Van’t Schip (Trustee) and Dale Lawson (Trustee).

== Schools ==
School	Location	Grades
Brooks Secondary School	Powell River	8-12
Westview Elementary School	Powell River	K-7
Edgehill Elementary School	Powell River	K-7
Henderson Elementary School	Powell River	K-7
James Thomson Elementary School	Powell River	K-7
Kelly Creek Community School	Powell River	K-7
Texada Elementary School	Van Anda	K-7

== See also ==
- List of school districts in British Columbia
