= Louis St. Laurent School =

7-12 school in Edmonton, Alberta (est. 1968)

Coordinates: 53°28′47″N 113°31′24″W

Louis St. Laurent Catholic Junior / Senior High School

Location
- 11230 - 43 Avenue; Edmonton, Alberta, T6J 0X8; Canada

Information
- School type: Secondary school
- Motto: "Through Faith We Aspire to Inspire: Body. Mind, and Soul!"
- Established: 1968: Louis St. Laurent Senior High School; 1974: facility physically amalgamates with Cartier McGee Junior High School (1966), renamed Louis St. Laurent Catholic Junior / Senior High School
- School board: Edmonton Catholic School District
- School number: 8409
- Administrator: Jackie Flynn
- Grades: 7–12
- Enrollment: 1100
- Language: English, French, Spanish
- Area: Edmonton, Alberta, Canada
- Colours: Green and Gold
- Mascot: Baron
- Team name: Barons
- Website: www.louisstlaurent.ecsd.net

Louis St. Laurent Catholic School is a fine arts oriented Junior and Senior High School in the Edmonton Catholic School District, located in south western Edmonton. It is also known as "Louis" or "LSL" by students and staff. The school averages a student body of approximately 1,000 or more pupils each year, spanning grades 7 through 12. From 2009 to 2022, the entire school participated in the International Baccalaureate program. As of 2016, a few students participate in the Spanish bilingual program. As of 2021, the school incorporates the Advanced Placement curriculum. In 2022, Spark Academy was introduced.

== History ==
Louis St. Laurent School is a combination junior/senior high school in the Edmonton Catholic School District, created by combining the former Cartier McGee Junior High School, built in 1966, and Louis St. Laurent High School, built in 1968. The junior high school is still referred to as the Cartier McGee side. In 1974, a central hallway was constructed to connect the two schools on the ground floor. The connector was further modified in 1993 to include a large ancillary room, which serves as a meeting room and lunch hall, as well as facilitating other activities that require a large, open space. From 2016 to 2018, it underwent renovations. In 2016, it officially became a bilingual school. The school is named for the 12th Prime Minister of Canada, Louis Stephen St. Laurent.

== Events ==
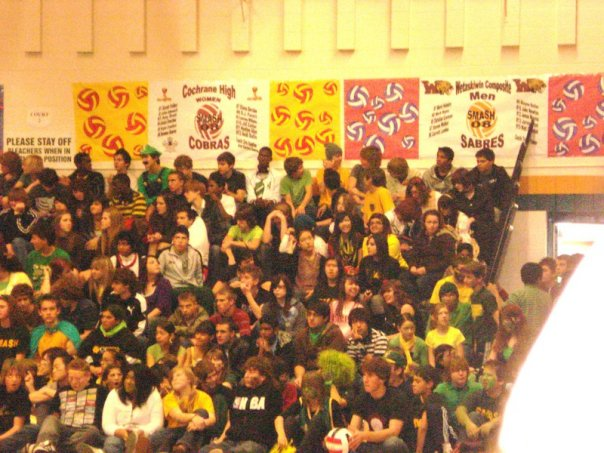
Students watching 2008 S.M.A.S.H. Tournament

=== S.M.A.S.H ===
Louis St. Laurent is considered to be a fine-arts based Catholic School, though it is also known for its athletic teams, especially volleyball. Every year near the end of October, the school holds a volleyball tournament called "S.M.A.S.H". Teams from various places in Alberta and British Columbia participate in this three-day event. It allows the junior and senior high students to gather and cheer for their varsity men's and women's volleyball high school teams. Students are also in control of some aspects of the tournament, which are hosted by the student union. A student from the high school art program has their design become the logo for the year. To show school pride, the students of Louis St. Laurent can usually be seen wearing green and yellow and/or their Halloween costume to support their team. Every student in the school watches the opening ceremony of the tournament and the first game with a Louis St.Laurent team playing against one of the visiting teams, before being dismissed to regular classes.

==== Performers ====
- Drum battle - a drum battle between a few high school students
- Smash Dancers - a group of students who perform a dance routine
- Louis Crew - the hip hop dance crew
- Teachers' Dance - a dance performance by a few teachers and staff

=== Green and Gold Classic ===
Green and Gold Classic is the high school basketball tournament. It takes place a week after the Christmas break. Unlike S.M.A.S.H., the opening ceremony is not attended by the whole school. Only the junior high students participate in the events. Teams from all over Alberta come to participate. It features mostly provincially ranked 3A teams.

==== Performers ====
- Louis Crew - the hip hop dance crew
- Dance - students from the dance class

=== Big Band Night ===
Louis St. Laurent hosts Big Band Night. It is a concert in which a few schools' jazz bands perform and which students may attend and dance to the music performed by Louis' Instrumental Jazz Band and other bands.

== Fine Arts ==
As a fine arts school, Louis St. Laurent offers multiple programs from grades 7 to 12. Most of the programs are progressive, requiring students to stay with the program through the grades. In grade 7, each student has an opportunity to select various classes they wish to participate in. As they progress through school, they have the option to drop the class, or add them if they meet the necessary requirements. Although fine arts is the focus of the school, not all students partake. Many attend the school for the athletics or academic programs.

=== Fine Arts Programs ===
- Art - this program offers various levels of instruction for students to learn about art. Art exhibits are presented throughout the year.
- Dance - students learn about different types of dance and different styles, and students showcase performances throughout the year. An intensive program is available.
- Drama - students develop and practice their acting skills. Various productions are presented during the year. An intensive program is available.
- Music - provides students comprehensive music instruction and performance. Mandatory in grade seven, students are required to progress through the graduated levels. Comprises individual and group performances throughout the course.

== Academics ==
=== Spanish Bilingual Program ===
Louis St. Laurent offers the option for some students to take some of their classes in Spanish. It is available for student in grades 7 through 11. They are able to incorporate Spanish along with their other courses. Two homeroom classes in junior high are reserved for students in the Spanish bilingual program. Half of these students are in both classes and meet together. Bilingual program continues through high school.

=== International Baccalaureate (IB) ===
As an IB school, Louis St. Laurent offers a variety of IB classes; both Standard Level and Higher Level. All students in grade 7 to 10 are enrolled in the Middle Year Program. In grade 11, students have the option of staying in the 2-year International Baccalaureate (IB) Program Diploma Program (DP); or continuing in the standard Alberta high school classes. They may choose to either take individual classes or graduate with an IB diploma in addition to the Alberta High School diploma.

The classes offered are: English (HL), French (SL), Spanish (HL/SL/ab initio), History (HL), Biology (HL), Chemistry (SL), Mathematics (SL), Visual Arts (SL), Theatre (SL), Dance (SL), and Music (SL).

As of 2021, the school offers an AP curriculum in place of the former IB.

=== Advanced Placement (AP) ===
In 2021, there was an announcement that the school would switch from an IB curriculum to AP. Many of the IB courses offered are now given through the AP curriculum. They offer in-class and online options. The in-class courses are: English Literature and Composition, Calculus AB, Physics 1, and Biology. The online courses are: Statistics, Environmental Sciences, European History, Art History, and Chemistry.

=== Enhanced Academic Program (EAP) ===
The EAP is a program designed to prepare junior high students for "high intellectual engagement" by starting the development of skills and acquisition of knowledge as early as possible. It includes more vigorous learning and challenges for students. The goal of the program is to prepare students for higher academic programs such as AP.

=== Spark Academy ===
The ECSD Spark Academy is a program that integrates creativity with STEM. Students "learn...skills in computers, coding and robotics, CAD and 3D printing, audio/video production, automation, and game theory".

=== WIN SR ===
An acronym standing for "Whatever is Necessary, Whenever it’s Needed". It is an inclusive program designed to help students with mild to severe cognitive needs to obtain a Certificate of Completion.

=== English Second Language (ESL) ===
As some students are new to Canada, Louis St. Laurent offers a program to instruct international students to learn English. These students are taught ESL during school hours to develop their English proficiency.

=== French Second Language ===
As part of the nine-year program, students at Louis St. Laurent are taught French. This is the default language taught. The majority of the student population is in the French program in junior high. In high school, they progress to the three-year program. This is taught in conjunction to the IB French course.

== Athletics ==
Athletics is one of the focuses of Louis St. Laurent. There are a variety of sports teams available for students to participate in.

=== Teams ===
The sports teams that are available for students to try out and play for are: badminton, basketball, cross-country running, curling, golf, soccer, softball, swimming, track and field, and volleyball. These teams participate and compete in games, competitions, meets and tournaments throughout the year.

=== Hockey Academy ===
Students have the opportunity to join the Hockey Academy, where they get an in-depth chance to practice and hone their skills. They play more often and have more training. Students in the academy have an altered schedule as they have practice during out of schedule hours. This is an option for both junior high and senior high students. Many athletes graduate from this program and move on to play for professional teams.

=== Soccer Academy ===
Students have the opportunity to join the Soccer Academy for students who wish to focus on their sports concentration in soccer. Students in the academy have an altered schedule as they have practice during out of schedule hours. This is an option for both junior high and senior high students.

=== Elite Athlete Program ===
Trained student athletes are given specialized programs that fit into their training schedule. This allows them to continue their training, while also completing the courses required by Alberta Education.

== Transportation ==
Louis St. Laurent provides students different forms of transportation, ranging from the popular yellow school bus to public transportation.

=== Yellow Bus ===
Students can take the yellow bus when passes are purchased via Powerschool's School Fees tab. After payment, students can pick up their bus passes from either the business office or the main office. However, students cannot take the yellow bus immediately. Their names and stop must be on the route for the bus driver, which can take up to 2 to 3 weeks to process.

=== Public Transport: Edmonton Transit Service ===
Students can take ETS and/or LRT to and from school. To do this, students must either have a bus pass, Arc card (introduced 2023), or cash/coins upon boarding. They can get an Arc card upon payment in the School Fees tab on Powerschool, and pick it up from the business office inside the school. Purchasing a monthly Arc card reload from ECSD allows for unlimited travel via bus or LRT when using the special card for that month until you pay the following month's fee. Students must tap on and tap off the bus, or be able to present the card upon request on the LRT. Students can also take school special bus routes offered by ETS, which are shared by the neighbouring public school Harry Ainlay..

== Traditions ==
Over the years, students have acquired traditions, especially among the grade twelve graduating class. Most noteworthy is the year-end water fight between grade twelve students, and a graduation prank. The Student Union oversees most of these events. After incidents of school break-ins and one year where crickets were set loose in the school, the school staff unsuccessfully attempted to discourage these traditions.

=== Other traditions include ===
- Touch of Class - as part of the preparation for graduation, the grade twelve students traditionally have their grad pictures taken before their graduation date. All high school students come in in their best formal wear for the day.
- Marathon Dance - a school dance where students dance for a set time period to earn money for charity. The marathon dance was discontinued for a few years, but was reinstated in 2010.
- Students vs Teachers Volleyball game - the varsity girls' and boys' volleyball teams play against the teachers during lunch period, and part of the third period after the season is over.
- Dodgeball Tournament - High school students create teams of six to compete in games of dodge ball during lunch. The winning team plays against the teachers in the final match. Though not officially a yearly event, student council has consistently organized this tournament between students and staff.

== Mascot ==
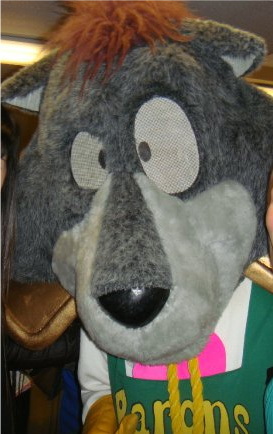
Louis St. Laurent's Mascot

The school has two mascots; one is the Baron, and the other is a nondescript animal called "Louis" in honour of the school name. A never missed event is the "S.M.A.S.H." tournament. Notably, they do not appear in many school games because the audience for the games are small. Auditions are held each year to determine the mascot but the results are kept secret to everyone except the student council to ensure the chosen student's identity is hidden.

The mascot is a grey animal with brownish-red hair and wearing a green jersey with the school team's name on it. The Baron mascot is similar to the school's logo—a warrior with a green helmet, green uniform and holding a green and gold shield and gold sword.

== Notable alumni ==
- Matt Berlin, hockey player
- Luke Prokop, professional ice hockey player
- James Rajotte, MP
- Stuart Skinner, professional ice hockey player
- Natasha Staniszewski, sports reporter of CFRN-TV
