= École des Pionniers =

École des Pionniers may refer to:

- École élémentaire catholique des Pionniers, located in Orléans, Ontario, Canada
- École des Pionniers (British Columbia), located in Port Coquitlam, British Columbia, Canada
- École des Pionniers (New Brunswick), located in Quispamsis, New Brunswick, Canada
