= École Gabrielle-Roy (Surrey) =

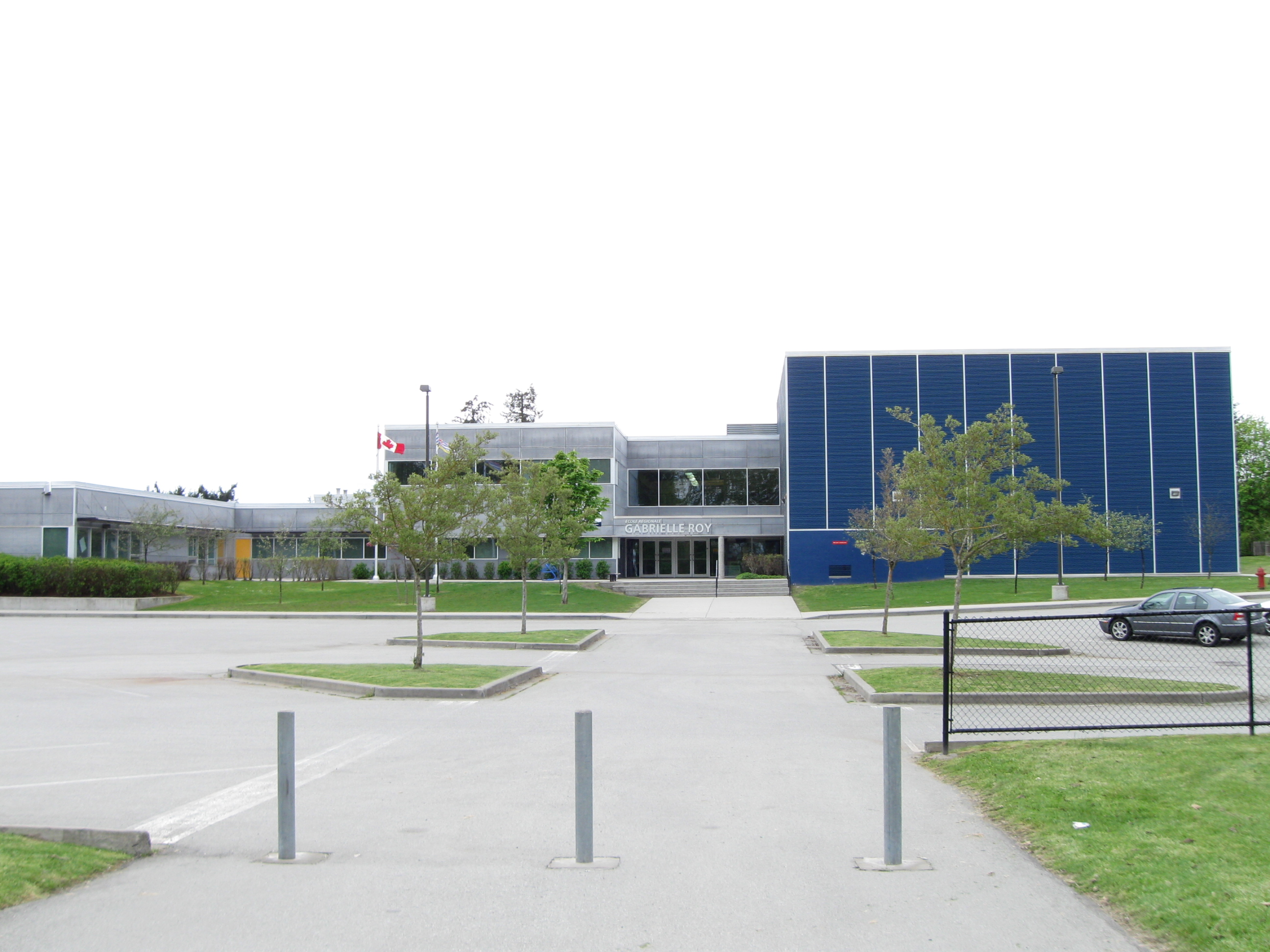

Location
- 6887-132nd Street; Surrey, British Columbia, V3W 4L9; Canada; 49.1284°N 122.8580°W

Information
- School type: Public school (government funded), Elementary school and high school
- Founded: September 1998
- School board: Conseil scolaire francophone de la Colombie-Britannique
- School number: 9393002
- Principal: Syndie Hébert
- Staff: 66
- Grades: K-12
- Enrollment: 604 (November 2025)
- Language: French
- Mascot: Phénix
- Website: Gabrielle Roy Official Website
- Last updated: April 15, 2018

École Gabrielle-Roy is a French first language elementary and high school in Surrey, British Columbia, Canada. It serves the francophone population of the Greater Vancouver Regional District. The school was built at the new location after the previous one burned down due to a fire started by fireworks in the school's library. The school is named in honour of French Canadian author Gabrielle Roy. École Gabrielle-Roy now has the International Baccalaureate Intermediate and Diploma programs for grades 7 to 12.

== Special programs ==
=== IB Programme ===
École Gabrielle-Roy offers an International Baccalaureate Programme in French. The IB classes included français, anglais, histoire, chimie, biologie, mathématiques, musique de groupe, théorie de la connaissance (TDC), mémoire et créativité, action, service (CAS).

=== Études Autochtones ===
Members of the Provincial Native Parents Committee, students and staff members have signed a first "Aboriginal Education Enhancement Agreement" with the Chair of the CSF Board of Governors, the Minister of Education of British Columbia, and representatives of indigenous communities.

Parents of children with an Aboriginal heritage can identify themselves on the CSF school registration forms. By Aboriginal heritage, we mean First Nations, Métis, Inuit, and non-status Aboriginal people. Any child identified as having an Aboriginal heritage is eligible. The Aboriginal ancestor can be a parent, grandparent, great-grandparent, etc. Funding provided by the Department of Education for this program is used to enhance academic, language and cultural programs for identified children. Parents are encouraged to engage in the process of developing a curriculum for their children.

== Diplomas ==
Diplomas	Description
"Dogwood"	Grade 12 Regular Diploma from the BC Ministry of Education. This is also the diploma graduates from English and immersion schools receive in BC.
"Cornouiller"	Grade 12 Diploma in French from the BC Ministry of Education. This diploma gives access to French-language post-secondary institutions and is only offered to graduates of CSF schools.
"IB Diploma"	International Baccalaureate Diploma. This degree is recognized by the BC Ministry and also in 150 countries around the world. Certificates are also offered for one or more courses.

== Sports ==
In the 2024-25 season, the Senior Boys' Basketball team won their first ever, the Greater Vancouver Independent Schools Athletic Association (GVISAA) Championship.

== Services ==
=== Technology ===
All students at Gabrielle-Roy are given access to a personal laptop computer as an educational tool for the remainder of their time at Gabrielle-Roy. From grade 10 till 12, the students are given the privilege to take their laptop home as a tool to complete their school work. The student laptops are also an essential to take online classes with École Virtuelle. In addition, Gabrielle-Roy issues an e-mail address for all students and staff, has a library with computers for research assignments and communication, and Smart Boards in a number of classrooms.

=== Pre and After School Care ===
Pre-school and after-school child care is also provided by Les Papillons of the Association francophone de Surrey.
