= École Franco-Nord =

Location
- 2641 Ellison Drive; Prince George, British Columbia, V2M 2S6; Canada
- Coordinates: 53°54′24″N 122°46′16″W

Information
- School type: Public, Elementary school
- School board: Conseil scolaire francophone de la Colombie-Britannique
- School number: 9357053
- Principal: Dolorès Patenaude
- Staff: 15
- Grades: K-7
- Enrollment: 103 (September 2004)
- Language: French
- Website: franconord.csf.bc.ca
- Last updated: 28 May 2006

École Franco-Nord is a French-language elementary school located in Prince George, British Columbia, Canada. The school's name is a reference to the northern geographic location of Prince George within British Columbia (nord translates to north).
