= Bastarache =

Bastarache (French pronunciation: [bas.ta.ʁɑʃ]) is a French surname of Basque origin. It was formed as a patronym of Basterreche, which itself is a topographic name for someone who lived in a house by a boundary, or on the edge of a settlement or the corner of a street. It is ultimately derived from Basque bazter ("border", "edge") and eche ("house"). It was one of the original Acadian surnames.

== Notable people ==
Notable people with this surname include:

- Michel Bastarache dit Basque (1730–1820), Canadian Acadian
- Michel Bastarache (born 1947), Canadian judge
- Vicky Bastarache (born 1973), Canadian softball player

== Places ==
The hamlet of Bastarache in Sainte-Marie-de-Kent, New Brunswick was named after early settlers Joseph Bastarache, Isidore Bastarache or Peter Bastarache, or after Adrien Bastarache, the first postmaster.
