= École Victor-Brodeur =

Location
- 637, rue Head; Esquimalt, British Columbia, V8R 4T4; Canada; 48°25′55.84″N 123°24′8.94″W

Information
- School type: Public, Elementary school
- School board: Conseil scolaire francophone de la Colombie-Britannique
- School number: 9361060
- Principal: Iza Labbé
- Staff: 43
- Grades: K-12
- Enrollment: 670 (September 18th 2018)
- Language: French
- Website: brodeur.csf.bc.ca

École Victor-Brodeur is a French first language K-12 school located in Esquimalt, British Columbia, Canada. It is designed to accommodate 540 students from the Greater Victoria area and to serve as a community centre for the local francophone community. It was named for Royal Canadian Navy officer Victor Brodeur, who was one of the first "group of six" officer cadets accepted into the RCN and also one of the 3% of Quebec born officers to reach the rank of Rear Admiral.

The school is operated by the Conseil Scolaire Francophone (CSF), the public school district that represents francophone students throughout the province. The school is the second-largest such school in B.C. and also operates a pre-school and a before- and after-school student care program.

The school district has a partnership agreement with the municipality of Esquimalt to share the use of school and nearby municipal facilities, including the school's theatre, gym, basketball courts, field, and kitchen, as well as the public recreation centre, Archie Browning Arena, and Bullen Park.

== History ==
École Victor-Brodeur was formed from the 1985 merger of the two local Francophone schools, the "Programme Cadre de français" at Uplands Elementary School in nearby Oak Bay and a school for the children of the military at CFB Esquimalt. The newly formed school occupied the old Harbour View School with 207 students. During construction of the new facility, the school operated temporarily in Richmond School and Uplands Elementary School.

The school is named after Victor-Gabriel Brodeur, a rear admiral in the RCN who served at the Esquimalt military base.

== Facilities and Programs ==
The current school is a replacement school of the same name and was completed in January 2007 at a cost of $19 million which was provided by the provincial and federal governments. It was designed by Marceau Evans Johnson Architects to be "eco-friendly" and incorporates many sustainable design features, including a highly efficient mechanical system, a rainscreen envelope, an emphasis on the use of natural light, environmentally friendly materials, and permeable paving. The project earned a LEED Silver rating.

The school also hosts the studios of CILS-FM (Radio Victoria), the Victoria-Esquimalt region's francophone community radio station, which itself collaborates with the school on media and journalism education programs for students.

The school offers high school students the option to complete the International Baccalaureate program either through certificates or the diploma.

International Baccalaureate
