= École du Pacifique =

Location
- 5538 Shorncliffe; Sechelt, British Columbia, V0N 3A0; Canada; 49°28′23″N 123°45′51″W

Information
- School type: Public, Elementary/Secondary school
- Founded: September 1989
- School board: Conseil scolaire francophone de la Colombie-Britannique
- Principal: Caroline Picard
- Staff: 16
- Grades: K-7
- Enrollment: 145 (September 2010)
- Language: French
- Website: pacifique.csf.bc.ca
- Last updated: March 11, 2011

L'École du Pacifique is a French first language elementary school located in Sechelt, British Columbia, Canada. It serves the Francophone population of the Sunshine Coast, British Columbia. It includes a French Program at Chatelech Secondary School. Since September 2010, there are 15 staff and 145 students in the Francophone Program from Kindergarten to Grade 12.
