= CILS-FM =

Canadian radio station in Victoria, British Columbia

Coordinates: 48°25′26″N 123°20′10″W

- Victoria, British Columbia; Canada
- Broadcast area: Greater Victoria
- Frequency: 107.9 MHz
- Branding: Radio Victoria

Programming
- Language: French
- Format: community radio

Ownership
- Owner: Société Radio Communautaire Victoria

History
- First air date: November 7, 2007

Technical information
- Class: A1
- ERP: 250 watts
- HAAT: 91.8 metres (301 ft)

Links
- Website: radiovictoria.ca

CILS-FM is a Canadian radio station, which broadcasts at 107.9 FM in Victoria, British Columbia. Branded as Radio Victoria, the station airs a community radio format for the region's Franco-Columbian community.

The station was licensed by the Canadian Radio-television and Telecommunications Commission (CRTC) in 2005. The station currently broadcasts from studios at the École Victor-Brodeur francophone school in suburban Esquimalt.

The station is a member of the Alliance des radios communautaires du Canada.
