= L'Anse-au-sable =

École de l’Anse-au-sable

Location
- 675 Lequime Road; Kelowna, British Columbia, V1W 1A3; Canada; 49.8351°N 119.4842°W

Information
- School type: Public, elementary school and high school
- School board: Conseil scolaire francophone de la Colombie-Britannique
- School number: 9323027
- Principal: Sébastien Hachey (2024)
- Staff: 52 (2024)
- Grades: K-12
- Enrollment: 225 (September 2009)
- Language: French
- Website: anseausable.csf.bc.ca

École de l'Anse-au-sable is a French-language elementary and secondary school located in Kelowna, British Columbia, Canada. The name L'Anse-au-sable translates to sandy cove in English.

In 2005, the BC Ministry of Education provided $3.2 million to the Conseil scolaire francophone de la Colombie-Britannique to help offset the costs associated with the purchase of the former Central Okanagan Academy. The move to the larger facilities allowed École de l'Anse-an-sable to accept 100 additional students and expand the school to grade 12.

École de l'Anse au sable provides Apple MacBook for grades 7 and up.

On May 30, 2008, four grade 12 students graduated from the school. They were the first ever students to graduate from the school.

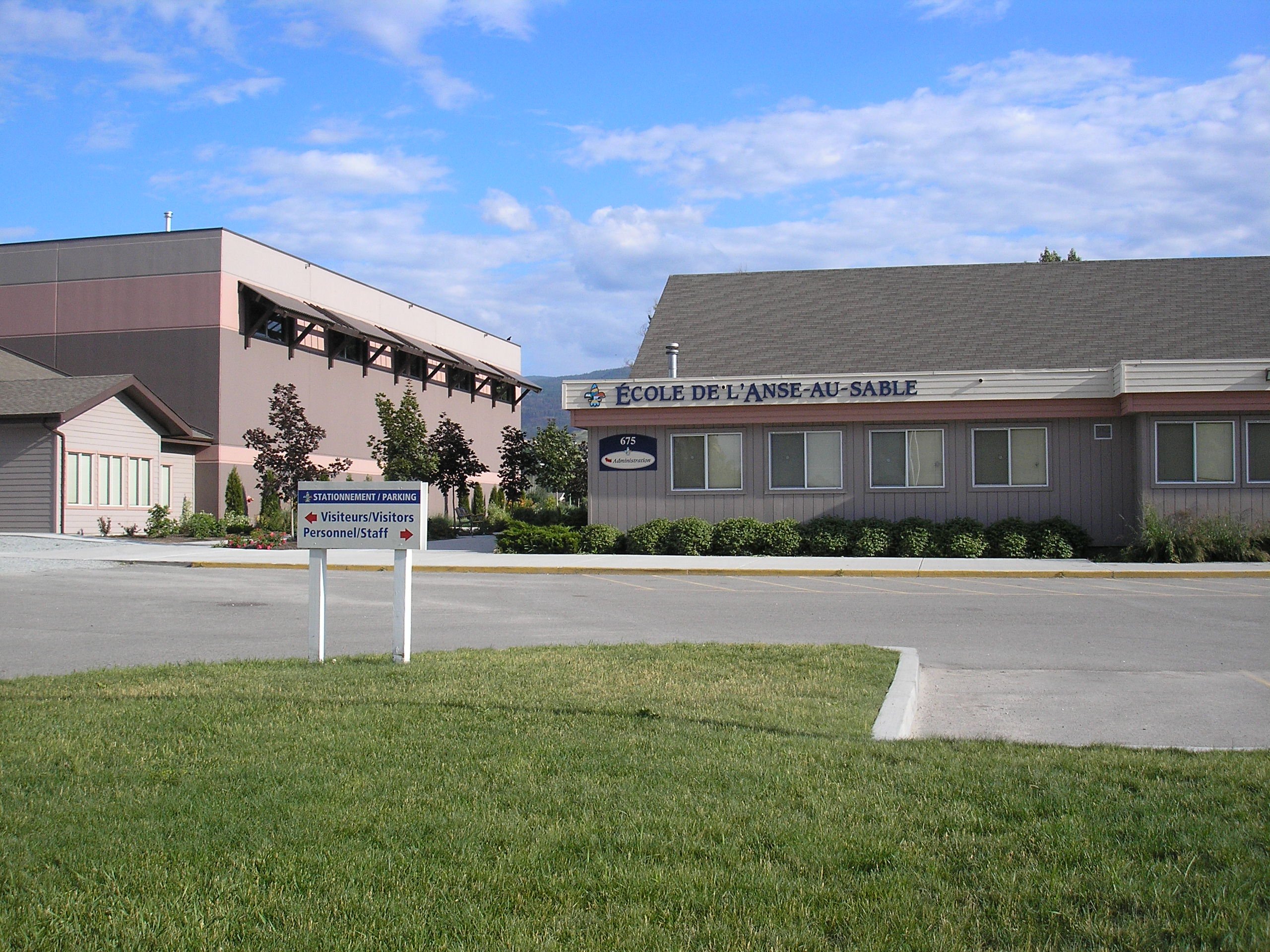
L'Anse-au-sable in Kelowna, British Columbia
