= École des Pionniers (British Columbia) =

École des Pionniers de Maillardville

Location
- 1618 Patricia Avenue; Port Coquitlam, British Columbia, V3B 4A8; Canada; 49.2760°N 122.7611°W

Information
- School type: Day care, Elementary school and high school
- School board: Conseil scolaire francophone de la Colombie-Britannique
- School district: 93
- School number: 9343092
- Principal: Francois Bergeron
- Grades: K-12
- Enrollment: 700 (September 2025)
- Language: French
- Mascot: Lynx
- Website: pionniers.csf.bc.ca

École des Pionniers de Maillardville is a French first language school located in Port Coquitlam, British Columbia, Canada. It serves the French speaking population of the Metro Vancouver area.

The school was founded in 2000 and is located on the former Terry Fox Secondary School grounds. It incorporates classes formerly held at Millside Elementary, Como Lake Middle and Centennial Secondary School in Coquitlam. The school now has the IB Diploma Programme in French for grade 11 and 12 students, and has the MYP IB Programme for grade 7 to 10 students. Not directly affiliated with École des Pionniers, but located within it and often a stepping stone to attending the school, is an independent non-profit francophone preschool called Prématernelle Les p'tits lutins.

== Extracurricular Activities ==
There are lots of lots of extracurricular activities offered at the school including:

- Chess Club
- Fishing Club: the club goes on fishing expeditions after school on Wednesdays
- Games Club: Pokemon, Yu-Gi-Oh and Magic, every Tuesday after school
- Improvisation Club
- Karaoke Club
- Magic Club
- Media Club
- MONU Club
- Mountain Biking Club
- News Channel: EDP Nouvelles
- Poetry Club
- School Newspaper: EDPresse
- Skateboarding Club
- Ski Club
- Student Counsel
- Walking Club
- Well-Being Club
- Yearbook Club

== Sports ==
There are a number of sports teams at École des Pionniers, who play in the Greater Vancouver Independent Schools Athletic Association (GVISAA). These teams consist of:

- Badminton
- Basketball
- Soccer
- Track and Field
- Volleyball

== Accolades in Sports ==
=== Volleyball ===
The Bantam Girls' volleyball team won the GVISAA Championship, in the 2016-17 season and again in the 2017-18 season.

The Junior Girls' volleyball team won the GVISAA Championship in the 2018-19 season.

The Senior Girls' volleyball team won the GVISAA Championship in the 2021-22 season and again a second time in the 2024-25 season.

== Diplomas ==
Diplomas	Description
"Dogwood"	Grade 12 Regular Diploma from the BC Ministry of Education. This is also the diploma awarded by English and immersion schools in British Columbia.
"Cornouiller"	Grade 12 Diploma in French from the BC Ministry of Education. This diploma gives access to French-language post-secondary institutions and is only offered to graduates of CSF schools.
IB Diploma Programme	International Baccalaureate Diploma This degree is recognized by the BC Ministry and also in 150 countries around the world. Certificates are also offered for one or more courses.

== New school construction ==
In 2013, the provincial government announced plans to build a new facility for the school, which has since been completed during the winter of 2018. The 32.7 million dollar project received joint funding from the Government of British Columbia ($27.3 million contributed for the replacement), the Government of Canada ($3.7 million contributed for community and child-care spaces within the school), and the Conseil Scolaire Francophone de la Colombie-Britannique ($1.7 million contributed for generalities and additional classrooms). Since the old school's demolition, the space has since been turned into a playing field and parking area.
