= Gosselin (Tutor of) v Quebec (AG) =

Gosselin (Tutor of) v Quebec (Attorney General)
- Supreme Court of Canada

Hearing: 22 March 2004 Judgment: 31 March 2005
- Full case name: Roger Gosselin, Guylaine Fillion, Daniel Trépanier, Claudette Gosselin, Guy Boulianne, Johanne Labbé, Alain Chénard, Rachel Guay, Gilles Maltais, Guylaine Potvin, Jean‑Marie Martineau, Mance Bourassa, Marc Joyal, Marie‑Irma Cadet, René Giguère and Lucille Giordano v Attorney General of Quebec and Minister of Education
- Citations: 2005 SCC 15
- Docket No.: 29298
- Prior history: Appeal from Gosselin c. Québec (Procureur général), 2002 CanLII 11763 (15 May 2002)
- Ruling: Appeal dismissed

Court membership
- Chief Justice: Beverley McLachlin; Puisne Justices: John C. Major, Michel Bastarache, Ian Binnie, Louis LeBel, Marie Deschamps, Morris Fish, Rosalie Abella, Louise Charron

Reasons given
- Unanimous reasons by: The Court
- Abella and Charron JJ took no part in the consideration or decision of the case.

Gosselin (Tutor of) v Quebec (AG), 2005 SCC 15, [2005] 1 SCR 238 is a leading case of the Supreme Court of Canada on the constitutional protection of minority language rights under section 23 of the Canadian Charter of Rights and Freedoms.

The case was part of a trilogy of minority language rights cases including Solski (Tutor of) v Quebec (AG), 2005 SCC 14, and Okwuobi v Lester B Pearson School Board; Casimir v Quebec (AG); Zorrilla v Quebec (AG), 2005 SCC 16.

A number of French-speaking families who wanted their children educated in English but did not qualify under the Charter of the French Language for English schooling challenged the French Charter as a violation of their equality rights under sections 10 and 12 of the Quebec Charter of Human Rights and Freedoms.

The Court dismissed the claim. It ruled that the parents were not covered under the minority language rights provision in section 23 of the Canadian Charter. The Court also determined that the equality right cannot be employed to nullify other rights under the Constitution; hence there was no violation.

== See also ==
- List of Supreme Court of Canada cases (McLachlin Court)
