= Minority language =

Language spoken by a minority of the population of a territory

A minority language is a language spoken by a minority of the population of a territory. Such people are termed linguistic minorities or language minorities. With a total number of 196 sovereign states recognized internationally (as of 2019) and an estimated number of roughly 5,000 to 7,000 languages spoken worldwide, the vast majority of languages are minority languages in every country in which they are spoken. Some minority languages are simultaneously also official languages, such as Irish in Ireland or the numerous indigenous languages of Bolivia. Likewise, some national languages are often considered minority languages, insofar as they are the national language of a stateless nation.

== Definitions ==
There is no scholarly consensus on what a "minority language" is, because various different standards have been applied in order to classify languages as "minority language" or not. According to Owens (2013), attempts to define minority languages generally fall into several categories:

- Demographic definitions: "Minority languages are those whose speakers are fewer than those of another group(s), within a defined area." In highly linguistically diverse areas, this can mean that even the largest language community is smaller than 50% of the total population of that area (a "plurality language" rather than a "majority language"). As an example, de Vries (1990) pointed out that at the time, the country of Cameroon's largest linguistic group, Fang, constituted only 19% of the total Cameroonian population, and was thus a minority in the country.
- Socio-political definitions: "Minority languages are those which a given population perceives to be minority ones", or even "those languages whose speakers, the linguistic minority, feel their language as threatened." Such definitions have several issues in that they tend to be subjective, used for political campaigning to urge political and legal institutions to officially recognise them, and to suffer from Eurocentrism.
- Ethno-social definitions: Allardt (1984) proposed a definition of "minority language" based on four criteria: "self-categorization, common descent, distinctive linguistic, cultural or historic traits related to language, social organization of the interaction of language groups in such a fashion that the group becomes placed in a minority position." Owens (2013) pointed out that these criteria are 'useful', but in practice, many suggested "minority languages" cannot fulfill all four criteria simultaneously; for example, some members of proposed linguistic minorities do not self-categorise with it, or do not claim common descent with all other members. Finally, the social organisation of a linguistic minority into a (political) minority position is problematic for various reasons, such as situations in which the politically dominant linguistic group in society is outnumbered by a politically marginalised group. As an example, Owens stated that French-speaking colonists (Pied-Noirs) in French Algeria were a demographic minority, but marginalised the Arabic-speaking majority population (along with Berber-speaking groups such as the Kabyles), leaving open the question which language should be considered a "minority language" or not in this situation.

== Law and international politics ==
=== Europe ===
Participation in the European Charter for Regional or Minority Languages Member states that have signed and ratified the charter. Member states that have signed but not ratified the charter. Member states that have neither signed nor ratified the charter. Non-member states of the Council of Europe. Source: the list of signatories at the Council of Europe website.

Definitions

In most European countries, the minority languages are defined by legislation or constitutional documents and afforded some form of official support. In 1992, the Council of Europe adopted the European Charter for Regional or Minority Languages to protect and promote historical regional and minority languages in Europe. For the purposes of the Charter, it stipulated the following definitions:

a.
"regional or minority languages" means languages that are:

i.
traditionally used within a given territory of a State by nationals of that State who form a group numerically smaller than the rest of the State's population; and
ii.
different from the official language(s) of that State;

it does not include either dialects of the official language(s) of the State or the languages of migrants;
b.
"territory in which the regional or minority language is used" means the geographical area in which the said language is the mode of expression of a number of people justifying the adoption of the various protective and promotional measures provided for in this Charter;
c.
"non-territorial languages" means languages used by nationals of the State which differ from the language or languages used by the rest of the State's population but which, although traditionally used within the territory of the State, cannot be identified with a particular area thereof.

Attitudes towards the Charter

The signatories that have not yet ratified it as of 2012 are Azerbaijan, France, Iceland, Ireland, Italy, North Macedonia, Malta, and Moldova. Refraining from signing or ratifying the Charter is also caused by the refusal (for instance, in Estonia or Malta) to recognize such postimperial world languages as English, French or Russian as minority languages, even if they are spoken by minority populations. The symbolic, cultural and political power vested in such world languages empowers any demographically minority population to such a degree that any additional rights (for example, the status of a minority language) granted to their given world language may precipitate the rapid decline of the state (national) language in favor of the world language. That is the situation in Belarus, where after 1995 Russian empowered as an 'equal co-official language' marginalized the use of Belarusian. The Charter was employed to achieve the same effect in Ukraine after 2010 by marginalizing Ukrainian through empowered Russian, a scenario which was only prevented by the Revolution of Dignity in 2014.

=== Canada ===
In Canada, the term "minority language" is used in the Constitution of Canada, in the heading above section 23 of the Canadian Charter of Rights and Freedoms, which guarantees educational rights to official language minority communities. It is generally understood to mean whichever of the official languages is less spoken in a particular province or territory (i.e., English in Québec, French elsewhere).

== Politics ==
Minority languages may be marginalised within nations for a number of reasons. These include having a relatively small number of speakers, a decline in the number of speakers, and popular belief that these speakers are uncultured, or primitive, or the minority language is a dialect of the dominant language. Support for minority languages is sometimes viewed as supporting separatism, for example, the ongoing revival of the Celtic languages in the British Isles and France (Irish, Welsh, Scottish Gaelic, Manx, Cornish and Breton). The dominant culture may consider use of immigrant minority languages to be a threat to unity, indicating that such communities are not integrating into the larger culture. Both of these perceived threats are based on the notion of the exclusion of the majority language speakers. Often this is added to by political systems by not providing support (such as education and policing) in these languages.

Speakers of majority languages can and do learn minority languages, through the large number of courses available. It is not known whether most students of minority languages are members of the minority community re-connecting with the community's language, or others seeking to become familiar with it.

=== Controversy ===
Views differ as to whether the protection of official languages by a state representing the majority speakers violates the human rights of minority speakers. In March 2013, Rita Izsák, UN Independent Expert on minority issues, said that "protection of linguistic minority rights is a human rights obligation and an essential component of good governance, efforts to prevent tensions and conflict, and the construction of equal and politically and socially stable societies".

In Slovakia for example, the Hungarian community generally considers the 'language law' enacted in 1995 to be discriminatory and inconsistent with the European Charter for the Protection of Regional or Minority languages. The Majority Slovaks believed that minority speakers' rights are guaranteed, in accordance with the highest European standards, and are not discriminated against by the state language having preferential status. The language law declares that "the Slovak language enjoys a preferential status over other languages spoken on the territory of the Slovak Republic." As a result of a 2009 amendment, a fine of up to €5,000 may be imposed for a misdemeanor from the regulations protecting the preferential status of the state language, e.g. if the name of a shop or a business is indicated on a sign-board first in the minority language and only after it in Slovak, or if in a bilingual text, the minority language part is written with bigger fonts than its Slovak equivalent, or if the bilingual text on a monument is translated from the minority language to the dominant language and not vice versa, or if a civil servant or doctor communicates with a minority speaker citizen in a minority language in a local community where the proportion of the minority speakers is less than 20%.

Sign languages are often not recognized as true natural languages, although extensive research supports the case that they are independent languages.

Speakers of auxiliary languages have also struggled for their recognition. They are used primarily as second languages and have few native speakers.

=== Numerical thresholds ===
- Belgium: From Belgium's founding in 1830, the government had promoted French as the sole national language. The marginalised Dutch-language community, generally known as Flemish people, gradually managed to emancipate itself through the Flemish Movement, and in 1898 the Equality Law (Dutch: Gelijkheidswet) first recognised Dutch as equal to French in judicial matters (legal documents). The 1919 annexation of the mostly German-speaking Eupen-Malmedy area in to Belgium also led to a movement for the recognition of German as a local minority language. By 1930, a rough agreement had emerged that Belgian citizens should be able to communicate with the authorities in their native language in the municipalities where it constituted the majority of speakers. According to the "Law of 28 June 1932 on the use of languages in administrative matters" (Dutch: Wet van 28 juni 1932 op het gebruik van de talen in bestuurszaken Loi du 28 juin 1932 relative à l'emploi des langues en matière administrative), the municipalities of Belgium were considered "bilingual" if speakers of a minority language constituted at least 30% of the municipal population, which meant that the linguistic minority was entitled to certain rights. To determine these percentages, reference was made to the linguistic census (Dutch: talentelling French: recensement linguistique). The first census, held in 1846, was widely regarded as scholarly reliable regarding the numbers of speakers; however, from the second linguistic census of 1886 onwards, the methodology of the census changed, pressure on citizens to report speaking or knowing the French language increased, more and more cases of fraud were found, and the reliability of the results was increasingly questioned by scholars and Flemish activists. For example, a 1933 investigation concluded that in 22 of the 23 language border municipalities in which the 1930 census was conducted, the results were incorrect, and in each case, the incorrect results favoured the French language; moreover, some 'language inspectors' tasked with checking the accuracy results had received death threats. The legal effect of the censuses was that certain previously monolingually-Dutch municipalities became bilingual or even monolingually-French, and further stimulated the Francization of Brussels. The most controversial language census of 1947 led to an uproar of Flemish protest and the eventual abolition of the controversial language censuses. Finally, the Belgian language border was made permanent in 1963. The remaining 27 Municipalities with language facilities have been a continuous source of controversy in Belgian politics, focusing on the interpretation and legality of the 1997 Peeters directive, which held that the facilities were temporary measures that should eventually be abolished after the French-speaking minorities in the Dutch-language area had sufficiently learnt the Dutch language.
- North Macedonia: The Ohrid Agreement of 13 August 2001 included provisions for altering the official Languages of North Macedonia, with any language spoken by more than 20% of the population becoming co-official with the Macedonian language at the state level and the municipal level. As of 2002, only the Albanian language qualified under this criterion as a co-official language at the state level, and in certain municipalities, and was thus recognised as such.

== Languages lacking recognition in some countries ==
These are languages that have the status of a national language and are spoken by the majority population in at least one country, but lack recognition in other countries, even where there is a significant minority linguistic community:

- Albanian: official language of Albania and a recognised minority language in many countries, including Romania, but not recognized as a minority language in Greece, where 4% of the population are ethnic Albanians.
- Bulgarian: official language of Bulgaria and a recognised minority language in the Czech Republic (4,300 speakers), but not officially recognized as minority language in Greece.
- German: classified as an official language in Germany, Austria, Luxembourg, Belgium, Switzerland and the Italian province of South Tyrol, and as a recognised national language in Namibia. It has no legal recognition in France, where there is a German-speaking minority.
- Hungarian: official in Hungary, and co-official in Serbia's Vojvodina province (293,000 speakers). It is a recognised minority language in the Czech Republic (14,000 speakers), and in Romania (1,447,544 speakers, 6.7% of the population), in those communities where the Hungarian speakers exceed 20% of the population; in Slovakia (520,000 speakers, approximately 10% of the population); in Slovenia (6,243 speakers in 2002), and in Ukraine (170,000 speakers).
- Macedonian – Macedonian is not recognized as a minority language in Greece and Bulgaria.
- Polish – recognized minority language in the Czech Republic (51,000 speakers), but it is not officially recognized as a minority language in Lithuania.
- Romanian: official in Romania and co-official in Vojvodina province, Serbia, with (30,000 speakers), but it does not have official status in Serbia, where another 5300 speakers live outside this province. Note: Ethnologue estimates 250,000 Romanian speakers in Serbia. It is a minority language in northwestern Bulgaria (estimated 10,566 speakers); and in Ukraine (estimated 450,000 speakers).
- Russian: official in Russia, and co-official in Belarus and Kazakhstan. It lacks official status in Estonia and Latvia, likely for historical reasons following Russian dominance during the Soviet Union era; more than 25% of the population in both Estonia and Latvia are Russian speakers.
- Serbian: official in Serbia, and co-official in Bosnia and Herzegovina and Kosovo. It has minority status in Montenegro, Croatia, North Macedonia, Hungary, Slovakia, Czech Republic, and Romania. The minority status in Montenegro is controversial because the majority of the population (63.49%) declared Serbian to be their mother tongue. Serbian was an official language there until 2007, when Montenegro ratified a new constitution.
- Turkish: official in Turkey, Turkish Republic of Cyprus and co-official in Cyprus. It has minority status in Bosnia and Herzegovina, Croatia, North Macedonia, Greece, Kosovo, Iraq, and Romania. Apart from these countries, there are native speakers in Bulgaria (8,4% of the population) and Syria (the third most widely used language), but it lacks minority language status.

== Significant languages having no majority of speakers in any country ==
Linguistic communities that form no majority of population in any country, but whose language has the status of an official language in at least one country:

- Marathi: 83 million speakers; official status in India
- Telugu: 82 million speakers; official status in India
- Tamil: 78 million speakers; official status in India, Sri Lanka, and Singapore
- Berber: 45 million speakers; official status in Morocco and Algeria
- Sundanese: 32 million speakers; regional official status in West Java and Banten, Indonesia
- Kurdish: 22 million speakers; official status in Iraq
- Afrikaans: 13 million first or second language speakers (16 million speakers with basic knowledge); official status in South Africa, recognized regional language in Namibia
- Catalan: 10 million speakers; official status in Andorra, regional official status in Catalonia, the Valencian Community (as Valencian), and the Balearic Islands in Spain. Recognized regional language in Alghero, a city in Sardinia (Italy). It has no official status in Northern Catalonia (France).
- Low Saxon: 4.35–7.15 million speakers; recognised minority language in the Netherlands and Germany
- Galician: 3–4 million speakers; regional official status in Galicia, Spain.
- Limburgish: 2 million speakers; statutory provincial language in Limburg, the Netherlands
- Sardinian: 1.35 million native (first or second language) speakers, more with some knowledge; regional official status in Sardinia
- Basque: 665,800 speakers; regional official status in the Basque Country and Navarre in Spain. It has no official status in the Northern Basque Country in France.
- Welsh: 622,000 speakers; regional official status in Wales (UK); minority in Chubut, Argentina, with no legal recognition.
- Frisian languages: 400,000 speakers; regional official language in Netherlands, Denmark and Germany.
- Irish: 291,470 native speakers (1.66 million with some knowledge); official status in Ireland and an officially recognised minority language in the United Kingdom.
- Occitan: 200,000 native speakers; regional official status in Spain as Aranese in the Val d'Aran (Catalonia) and Catalonia proper
- Māori: 157,110 speakers; official status in New Zealand
- Corsican: 125,000 native (first or second language) speakers; regional co-official status in Corsica
- Scottish Gaelic: 87,000 people with some ability, 57,375 of which are first and second language speakers. Official status in Scotland (UK). 300 native speakers, 2,320 overall in Canada, minority status. About 1,900-speakers minority in the United States.
- Romansh: 60,000 speakers; official status in Switzerland (Graubünden)
- Northern Sámi: 25,000 native speakers; official status in Norway, recognised minority language in Sweden and Finland
- Cherokee: 2,000 speakers; official status within the Cherokee Nation of Oklahoma, a sovereign nation

== Lawsuits ==
- Alexander v. Sandoval
- Arsenault-Cameron v. Prince Edward Island: a 2000 Supreme Court of Canada decision which determined that, based on Section 23 of the Canadian Charter of Rights and Freedoms, in the specific circumstances of a French-language minority in Summerside, Prince Edward Island, the Francophone parents of an estimated potential of 49 to 155 students were entitled to a French-language primary school within town rather than having to bus their children to another Francophone school 57 kilometres away.
- Casimir v. Quebec (Attorney General)
- Charlebois v. Saint John (City)
- Devine v. Quebec (Attorney General)
- Doucet-Boudreau v. Nova Scotia (Minister of Education)
- Gosselin (Tutor of) v. Quebec (Attorney General)
- Katzenbach v. Morgan
- Mahe v. Alberta
- R. v. Beaulac
- Société des Acadiens v. Association of Parents

== Treasure language ==
A treasure language is one of the thousands of small languages still spoken in the world today. The term was proposed by the Rama people of Nicaragua as an alternative to heritage language, indigenous language, and "ethnic language", names that are considered pejorative in the local context. The term is now also used in the context of public storytelling events.

The term "treasure language" references the desire of speakers to sustain the use of their mother tongue into the future:

[The] notion of treasure fit the idea of something that had been buried and almost lost, but was being rediscovered and now shown and shared. And the word treasure also evoked the notion of something belonging exclusively to the Rama people, who now attributed it real value and had become eager and proud of being able to show it to others.

Accordingly, the term is distinct from endangered language for which objective criteria are available, or heritage language which describes an end-state for a language where individuals are more fluent in a dominant language.

== See also ==
- Convention against Discrimination in Education (Article 5)
- Cross-border language
- European Charter for Regional or Minority Languages
- Global language system
- Indigenous language
- Indigenous Tweets
- Language education
- Language minority students in Japanese classrooms
- Language policy
- Language revitalization
- Linguistic demography
- Linguistic rights
- List of language self-study programs
- Lists of endangered languages
- Minoritized languages
- Minority group
- Nationalism
- Regional language

== Bibliography ==
- Owens, Jonathan (2013). Arabic as a Minority Language. Berlin: Walter de Gruyter. p. 468. ISBN 9783110805451.
