= Brooks Secondary School =

Brooks Secondary

Location
- 5400 Marine Avenue; Powell River, British Columbia, V8A 2L6; Canada
- Coordinates: 49.8627°N 124.5422°W

Information
- School type: Public, high school
- School board: School District 47 Powell River
- School number: 4747021
- Administrator: Jasmin Marshman
- Staff: 100
- Grades: 8-12
- Enrollment: 937 (September 2008)
- Area: Townsite
- Colours: Blue, white, and gold
- Mascot: Thunderbird
- Website: www.sd47.bc.ca/school/brooks/Pages/default.aspx

Brooks Secondary School is a high school in Powell River, British Columbia, part of School District 47 Powell River. Recent expansion to the school added a 100 by 50 meter turf field. Brooks is also home to the Max Cameron Theatre, a 500-seat two level proscenium theatre.

== History ==
Brooks Secondary was rebuilt on the same site as the original Brooks school. The new Brooks saw its first graduating class in 1996. In the early 2000s, Max Cameron Secondary School, the other high school in Powell River, was closed and Brooks Secondary became the sole high school in town.

== Fine arts ==
The school is home to numerous musical groups, including two concert bands (junior and senior), a senior jazz band, a chamber choir, and a senior vocal jazz ensemble. The drama program has performed annual productions of numerous plays and musicals, such as Grease, Romeo and Juliet, and A Midsummer Night's Dream.

== Sports ==
The school fields teams for various sports, including boys' and girls' volleyball, soccer, and basketball. Their sports teams also include golf, rugby, and tennis.
