= Robert Smallboy =

Cree community leader (1898–1984)

Chief Robert (Bobtail) Smallboy (7 November 1898 – 8 July 1984), Cree name Keskayo Apitchitchiw, was a community leader who brought national attention to problems faced by urban and reserve Indians when he "returned to the land" with followers from troubled Canadian Indian reservations. He was born while his parents were "in transit" through the Peigan Nation, southwest of Fort Macleod, Alberta, on 7 November 1898, en route to his father's home in what was to become the Rocky Boy (now "Stonechild") Reservation in Montana, named after Bobtail's paternal grandfather. Bobtail spent his formative years there, long enough to speak Cree with a noticeable Chippewa accent. During the first world war, the Smallboys were among the last to settle on their allotted reserve at Hobbema in central Alberta, now named Maskwacis, a Treaty 6 nation now known for its rich oil and gas reserves. Smallboy became a hunter, trapper, farmer, and eventually chief of the Ermineskin Band from 1959 to 1969. In 1968, to escape deteriorating social and political conditions on the reserve, he moved to a bush camp on the Kootenay Plains. He attributed the alcoholism, drug abuse and suicide that he saw in his community to an attempt to live a modern lifestyle on the reserve rather than "The Indian Way". Accompanied by approximately 125 people and with help from other elders, he moved his community. Despite factional splits, the return of many residents to Hobbema, and the group's failure to obtain permanent land tenure, this community, "Smallboy Camp", persisted into the 21st Century as a working community used as a retreat by Plains and Woodlands Indians from western Canada and the US.

Smallboy received the Order of Canada in 1979.

== Early life ==
Smallboy was born in 1898. He was named Keskayo (Bobtail) by his famous maternal grandfather of the same name. However, "Bobtail" was shortened to "Bob" and later expanded in the popular press to "Robert." An Order of Canada Certificate and Medical Scholarship established in his honour are both in the name of "Robert" Smallboy. He also took his father's Cree name Apitchitchiw (Small Boy") as a surname. To add to the confusion, he was never baptized; so when a baptismal certificate was required for his wedding to Louisa Headman in 1918, he supplied his younger brother's certificate in the name "Johnny Smallboy". The records of Our Lady of the Seven Sorrows Church show the name "Bob" typed as an insertion in a different typeface; so he was also known as "Johnny Bob Smallboy." Thus, Smallboy was descended from two great chiefs of the Cree Nation in Alberta and Saskatchewan as well as the chief of the Chippewa-Cree in Montana: Big Bear and Bobtail on his mother's side and Rocky Boy on his father's side.

== Smallboy Camp or Mountain Cree Camp ==
Smallboy became Chief of the Ermineskin Cree Nation in 1959. He led a delegation to Ottawa after becoming a chief. He used this opportunity to address the problems of his people with the Canadian Government and even with Pope John Paul II in Rome, laying out such issues as a need for more land, unemployment, the breaking down of family units, rampant alcoholism, child neglect, and children were performing poorly in school. There was great loss of pride, dignity, religion, and social order, he said. This left people with little meaning in their lives. However, his pleas for help fell on deaf ears. As oil development and modernization engulfed his reserve, Chief Smallboy was saddened by the increasing use of alcohol and drugs, his people's loss of language due to television and their movement away from traditional rituals and medicines.

As oil revenue increased, people gave up farming. Meanwhile, domestic disputes, suicides and traffic deaths increased dramatically. Chief Smallboy could only find one solution and that was to take his followers away from this harmful environment and to embrace a more natural way of life. Based upon the principles of his forefathers, he made a decision to abandon the Ermineskin Reserve for the future of his children and grandchildren and for a good, peaceful life for them in a place far from the what he regarded as the evil influences of the modern world. In the summer of 1968, Chief Small Boy, together with Simon Omeasoo, Lazarus Roan, Alex Shortneck, and some 140 followers left the Ermineskin Reserve. They established a camp in the wilderness of the Kootenay Plains near the Rocky Mountains. They pitched a large council tepee, twenty tents, and, eventually, a portable classroom. They had no intention of reverting to the role of nomadic plains men, but sought isolation, while at the same time providing an acceptable level of education for their children. Chief Smallboy was adamant in maintaining the integrity of his camp and successfully avoided government efforts to close it down.

The camp was an inspiration to other Indigenous people in Canada and the United States and became a centre for learning about Cree Spiritual life. While there were disagreements and breakaways, Chief Smallboy was the undisputed chief. Smallboy camp was constituted under the Pearson administration and led directly to Smallboy and his followers abandoning their reserve at Hobbema and moving to the Kootenay Plains. ‘The treaty process had been a fraud,’ Chief Smallboy declared, this land has not been ceded to Queen Victoria. The collected chiefs who signed Treaty Six in 1876 and Treaty Seven in 1877 had no idea what land they were giving up. The undeveloped crown lands east of the Rocky Mountains, where they then resided, had not been included in Treaty Six or Treaty Seven. The Federal Government sees the camp as occupying crown land. But David Thompson had recognized that the Kootenay Plains and the mountains, including the Columbia Ice Fields, were sacred Indian land. Despite the inclusion of that strip of land, as the anomalous panhandle of Treaty Eight, signed away by tribes a thousand kilometers away, it remained sacred Indian land. It would be occupied by Smallboy‘s Band and any Indian who chose to follow. Thus it was that in 1968, Chief Bobtail Smallboy pitched his tent along with another dozen tents and tepees on the Kootenay Plains North of Abraham Lake.

In 1970s the Smallboy Camp split into two separate camps, with a third of the membership following Joseph Mackinaw to the Buck Lake Region, within the boundaries of Treaty Six. The deaths of Simon Omeasoo and Lazarus Roan led to a number of their relatives returning to Hobbema. The remaining members of the "Smallboy Band" retained their status in the Ermineskin Band. They were not deprived of their share of the oil royalties that occurred in 1970s & 1980s, and this gave each member of Ermineskin Band five hundred dollars a month. Smallboy had initially taken his band to the foothills to help alleviate poverty, yet the Ermineskin band soon became the richest band in the land, partly because of Smallboy's negotiations with big oil companies prior to his leaving Hobbema.

== Legacy and Artistic Tributes ==
In 1996, Tony Isaacs of the label Indian House Records, based in Taos, New Mexico, traveled to the remote location of the Smallboy Camp to make sound recordings.

Visual artist Joane Cardinal-Schubert created several artworks related to Smallboy and the tragedy of his death. Cardinal-Schubert also wrote a poem about Smallboy's death.

In 2005, Fifth House Books and Fitzhenry and Whiteside published Chief Smallboy: In Pursuit of Freedom, by Dr. Gary Botting, a long-time acquaintance of the Chief.

== Kisiko Awasis Kiskinhamawin in Mountain Cree Camp ==
The Mountain Cree Camp School was established on the Smallboy Camp in 1967. The school was not recognized by the province of Alberta or the Federal Government until 2009. Starting in 2005, Alberta Education started negotiations to establish a program with the school. In 2009, a formal agreement was struck by Alberta Education for the Edmonton Catholic School Board to provide educational support to the school.

== Death ==
On a visit to Banff in the winter of 1984, Chief Smallboy, who suffered from diabetes, went for a walk in freezing weather. He became disoriented: he could not find his hotel. Since he did not speak English, he was turned away from several hotels and was forced to stay the night outdoors. He suffered frostbite in his feet, which eventually turned gangrenous. He was treated at Wetaskiwin General Hospital, where he was refused the right to burn purifying sweetgrass. He pleaded to be returned his Camp, where he died on July 8th, 1984. After being smudged with a sweetgrass braid by his son Joe outside his cabin, he reached down and patted the soil. "Good land," he said. "Good land." These were his final words.
