= Vicky Bastarache =

Canadian softball player

Personal information
- Born: 16 May 1973 (age 51); Sainte-Anne-de-Kent, New Brunswick, Canada

Sport
- Sport: Softball

Vicky Bastarache (born 16 May 1973) is a Canadian softball player. She competed in the women's tournament at the 2000 Summer Olympics.

In April 2000, Bastarache suffered a hamstring injury during the Women's Softball World Cup, but recovered and pitched a no-hitter in July of that year.
