= Okwuobi v Lester B Pearson School Board =

Judgement of the Supreme Court of Canada

Okwuobi v Lester B Pearson School Board, 2005 SCC 16, is a leading Supreme Court of Canada decision on minority language rights. The Court held that parents in Quebec who are denied access to English schools for their children must apply through the Administrative Tribunal of Quebec (ATQ), which holds exclusive jurisdiction to hear appeals regarding minority language rights, and cannot bypass the tribunal by applying to the courts. In examining the intent of the Quebec legislation, the Court found that the tribunal also had the power to hear constitutional questions.

This decision was part of a trilogy of cases on minority language rights, which included Solski (Tutor of) v Quebec (AG), 2005 SCC 14, and Gosselin (Tutor of) v Quebec (AG), 2005 SCC 15.

The case was decided with Casimir v Quebec (AG) and Zorilla v Quebec (AG).

== See also ==
- List of Supreme Court of Canada cases (McLachlin Court)
