= Mahe v Alberta =

- Supreme Court of Canada

Hearing: June 14, 1989 Judgment: March 15, 1990
- Full case name: Jean‑Claude Mahe, Angeline Martel, Paul Dubé and the Association de l'école Georges et Julia Bugnet v Her Majesty The Queen in right of the province of Alberta
- Citations: [1990] 1 S.C.R. 342
- Ruling: Mahe appeal allowed

Court membership
- Chief Justice: Brian Dickson; Puisne Justices: Antonio Lamer, Bertha Wilson, Gérard La Forest, Claire L'Heureux-Dubé, John Sopinka, Charles Gonthier, Peter Cory, Beverley McLachlin

Reasons given
- Unanimous reasons by: Dickson C.J.

Mahe v Alberta, [1990] 1 S.C.R. 342, is a leading decision of the Supreme Court of Canada. The ruling is notable because the court established that section 23 of the Canadian Charter of Rights and Freedoms requires parents of the official-language minority in each province to have the right either to be represented on the school board or to have a school board of their own to provide adequate protection for the education rights of their children.

== Background ==
Three Edmonton citizens, Jean-Claude Mahe, Angeline Martel and Paul Dubé, were dissatisfied with the quality of the French-language schools provided by the Alberta government. In 1982, they submitted a proposal to the Minister of Education for a new French elementary school that would be administered by a committee of parents within an autonomous French school board.

The Minister of Education told them that it was not its policy to make such arrangements and so it suggested that they try to do so through the public school board. The board rejected them. Mahe and the others brought an action against the Alberta government for violating their right to a Francophone-run education system under section 23 of the Charter.

The questions before the Supreme Court were:

1. Have the rights of the Francophone population of Edmonton under section 23(2)(b) of the Charter been violated?
2. Do the rights under section 23 include the right to manage and control the schools? If so, what is the nature and extent of the management and control?
3. Does the provincial School Act violate section 23? If so, can it be saved under section 1 of the Charter?
4. Are the rights affected by section 93 of the Constitution Act, 1867, section 29 of the Charter, and section 17 of the Alberta Act?

== Opinion of the Court ==
The Court held that section 23 guarantees representation on the school board and exclusive control over the children's education with respect to culture, or it can guarantee a separate school board. However, there must be sufficient minority language population to warrant either level of protection. In this particular case, the Court decided representation on an existing school board would be sufficient and held that did not interfere with denominational school rights under section 29 of the Charter since it affected merely language.

The Court's unanimous decision was given by Chief Justice Brian Dickson. He began by examining the purpose of section 23, to "preserve and promote the two official languages of Canada, and their respective cultures." The section is intended to be remedial to prevent the loss of a minority group's language and cultural identity and so it must be interpreted in light of section 15 and 27 of the Charter.
