= Edmonton Catholic School Division =

School division in Alberta, Canada

Edmonton Catholic School Division Edmonton Catholic Separate School Division No. 7

Location
- 9405 -50 Street; Edmonton, Alberta, Canada Canada
- Coordinates: 53°32′9″N 113°30′9″W

District information
- Grades: K–12
- Superintendent: Lynette Anderson
- Chair of the board: Sandra Palazzo
- Schools: 96 (2021–22)
- Budget: C$513.2 million (2021-22)

Students and staff
- Students: 43,400 (2021-22)

Other information
- Elected trustees: Terry Harris, Ward 71; Sandra Palazzo, Ward 72; Vacancy, Ward 73; Debbie Engel, Ward 74; Alene Mutala, Ward 75; Lisa Turchansky, Ward 76; Laura Thibert, Ward 77
- Website: www.ecsd.net

Edmonton Catholic Separate School Division No. 7 or the Edmonton Catholic School Division (ECSD) is the Catholic school board in Edmonton, Alberta, Canada.

== Size ==
The Edmonton Catholic School Division currently operates 96 schools. There are a total of 1 pre-K school, 49 elementary schools, 21 elementary/junior high schools, 2 elementary/junior/senior high schools (not counting the Kisiko Awasis Kiskinhamawin in Mountain Cree Camp as the school is managed outside the ECSD main budget), 12 junior high schools, 1 junior/senior high school, 9 senior high schools (counting a 4-campus school as 1), and 1 senior high asynchronous online learning program (standalone, rather than logged in to follow along with a teacher lecturing a class in one of the physical schools).

As of the 2021–22 school year, ECSD has 43,400 students enrolled, with 4,300 staff, of which roughly 62% are certificated and 38% are classified support. The ECSD approved budget for 2021-22 is C$513.2 million.

== History ==
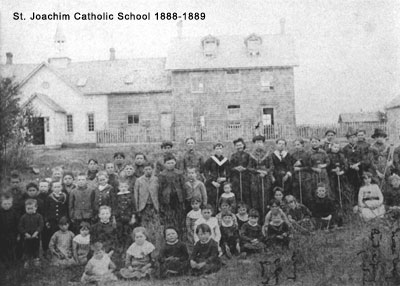
First Catholic School in Edmonton

In August 1888, Edmonton Catholic parents applied to organize a separate school district for their children. In October of that same year three sisters from the Faithful Companions of Jesus sailed from France to open a convent and a school in Edmonton. They began teaching at the newly formed St. Joachim Catholic School on 2 November 1888. That first year the sisters taught 23 students. At that time compulsory schooling began at age seven and was complete by the age of 12. From that start in 1888–89, they have grown from one school with 23 students to 96 schools with more than 43,000 students in 2021–22.

For many years the election of the trustees was at-large with half of them elected each year through Plurality block voting. All of the seats became up for election in each election after 1963.

== Programs ==
=== Early learning ===
Edmonton Catholic Schools offers a pre-kindergarten program for children aged 3 1/2 to 4 1/2 called the 100 Voices program which is available at a number of different schools in the district.

=== Language ===
The Edmonton Catholic School District offers a number of language programs.

==== Immersion and bilingual programs ====
- French immersion
- Ukrainian bilingual
- Spanish bilingual
- Polish bilingual

==== Language and culture programs ====
- Filipino
- Italian
- Spanish
- Ukrainian
- Nehiyaw Pimatisiwin Cree

== Schools ==
As of the 2021–22 school year, ECSD has 96 schools under its jurisdiction.

=== In detail ===
Instruction	School	Notes
Pre-K	St. Monica Early Learning Centre	
Elementary	Anne Fitzgerald	
Elementary	Annunciation	
Elementary	Bishop Greschuk	
Elementary	Bishop Savaryn	
Elementary	Divine Mercy	
Elementary	Father Leo Green	
Elementary	Frère Antoine	
Elementary	Good Shepherd	
Elementary	Holy Child	Changed name from Grandin to Holy Child on 28 June 2021.
Elementary	Blessed John Paul I	
Elementary	Katherine Therrien	
Elementary	Mary Hanley	
Elementary	Monsignor William Irwin	
Elementary	Our Lady of Peace	
Elementary	Our Lady of the Prairies	
Elementary	Our Lady of Victories	
Elementary	St. Angela	
Elementary	St. Anne	
Elementary	St. Augustine	
Elementary	St. Benedict	
Elementary	St. Bernadette	
Elementary	St. Bonaventure	
Elementary	St. Boniface	
Elementary	St. Charles	
Elementary	St. Dominic	
Elementary	St. Elizabeth	
Elementary	St. Francis of Assisi	
Elementary	St. Gerard	
Elementary	St. Jerome	
Elementary	St. John Bosco	
Elementary	St. Justin	
Elementary	St. Kateri	
Elementary	St. Leo	
Elementary	St. Lucy	
Elementary	St. Maria Goretti	
Elementary	St. Martha	
Elementary	St. Martin	
Elementary	St. Mary	
Elementary	St. Matthew	
Elementary	St. Philip	
Elementary	St. Pius X	
Elementary	St. Richard	
Elementary	St. Stanislaus	
Elementary	St. Teresa	
Elementary	St. Teresa of Calcutta	
Elementary	St. Timothy	
Elementary	St. Vincent	
Elementary	St. Vladimir	
Junior high	Cardinal Léger	
Junior high	Father Michael Troy	
Junior high	H.E. Beriault	
Junior high	J.J. Bowlen	
Junior high	St. Cecilia	
Junior high	St. Edmund	
Junior high	St. Hilda	
Junior high	St. Mark	
Junior high	St. Nicholas	
Junior high	St. Rose	
Junior high	St. Thomas More	
Junior high	Sir John Thompson	
Senior high	Archbishop MacDonald	
Senior high	Archbishop O'Leary	
Senior high	Austin O'Brien	
Senior high	Cardinal Collins Academic Centre – City Centre Campus	An alternative learning program previously known as Fresh Start. The City Centre Campus (Edmonton City Hall) operates in partnership with The Hallway program.
Senior high	Cardinal Collins Academic Centre – Clareview Campus	An alternative learning program previously known as Fresh Start. The City Centre Campus (Edmonton City Hall) operates in partnership with The Hallway program.
Senior high	Cardinal Collins Academic Centre – Mill Woods Campus	An alternative learning program previously known as Fresh Start. The City Centre Campus (Edmonton City Hall) operates in partnership with The Hallway program.
Senior high	Cardinal Collins Academic Centre – Westmount Campus	An alternative learning program previously known as Fresh Start. The City Centre Campus (Edmonton City Hall) operates in partnership with The Hallway program.
Senior high	Holy Trinity	
Senior high	Mother Margret Mary	
Senior high	Revelation Online	This is the only school that is a pure virtual school, each student follows their own asynchronous schedule.
Senior high	St. Francis Xavier	
Senior high	St. Joseph	Also offers an online program, as St. Joseph Catholic Online High School.
Senior high	St. Oscar Romero	School name adjusted as Archbishop and Martyr Óscar Romero progressed through beatification to canonization.
Elementary/junior high	Archbishop Joseph MacNeil	
Elementary/junior high	Ben Calf Robe/St. Clare	
Elementary/junior high	Bishop David Motiuk	
Elementary/junior high	Christ The King	
Elementary/junior high	Corpus Christi	
Elementary/junior high	Father Michael Mireau	
Elementary/junior high	Genesis Online School	A blended virtual school, where a class of students follow a shared synchronous schedule of two in-person class days and three online days.
Elementary/junior high	Holy Cross	
Elementary/junior high	Holy Family	
Elementary/junior high	Joan Carr	A new K-9 school opening in September 2022.
Elementary/junior high	Monsignor Fee Otterson	
Elementary/junior high	Our Lady of Mount Carmel	
Elementary/junior high	Sister Annata Brockman	
Elementary/junior high	St. Alphonsus	
Elementary/junior high	St. Basil	
Elementary/junior high	St. Brendan	
Elementary/junior high	St. Catherine	
Elementary/junior high	St. Clement	
Elementary/junior high	St. Edmund	
Elementary/junior high	St. Elizabeth Seton	
Elementary/junior high	St. John XXIII	
Elementary/junior high	St. Thomas Aquinas	
Junior/senior high	Louis St. Laurent	
Elementary/junior/senior high	J. H. Picard	
Elementary/junior/senior high	Kisiko Awasis Kiskinhamawin in Mountain Cree Camp	School is operated under contract, located at the Mountain Cree Camp near Robb, Alberta.
Elementary/junior/senior high	St. Gabriel Centre for Diverse Learning	Offers three programs: Guided Intervention Supported Transition (GIST), Positive Behaviour Supports (PBS), and Personal Pathways.

== See also ==
- List of Alberta school boards
- Edmonton Public Schools
