= Section 23 of the Canadian Charter of Rights and Freedoms =

Minority language education rights

Section 23 of the Canadian Charter of Rights and Freedoms is the section of the Constitution of Canada that guarantees minority language educational rights to French-speaking communities outside Quebec, and, to a lesser extent, English-speaking minorities in Quebec. The section may be particularly notable, in that some scholars believe that section 23 "was the only part of the Charter with which Pierre Trudeau was truly concerned." Trudeau was the prime minister who fought for the inclusion of the Charter of Rights in the Constitution of Canada in 1982.

Section 23(1)(b), or section 23 as a whole, are also known as the "Canada clause."

== Text ==
Under the heading "Minority Language Educational Rights," the section reads,

23.(1) Citizens of Canada

(a) whose first language learned and still understood is that of the English or French linguistic minority population of the province in which they reside, or
(b) who have received their primary school instruction in Canada in English or French and reside in a province where the language in which they received that instruction is the language of the English or French linguistic minority population of the province,

have the right to have their children receive primary and secondary school instruction in that language in that province.

(2) Citizens of Canada of whom any child has received or is receiving primary or secondary school instruction in English or French in Canada, have the right to have all their children receive primary and secondary school instruction in the same language.

(3) The right of citizens of Canada under subsections (1) and (2) to have their children receive primary and secondary school instruction in the language of the English or French linguistic minority population of a province

(a) applies wherever in the province the number of children of citizens who have such a right is sufficient to warrant the provision to them out of public funds of minority language instruction; and
(b) includes, where the number of those children so warrants, the right to have them receive that instruction in minority language educational facilities provided out of public funds.

Section 23 must be read in conjunction with Section 59 of the Constitution Act, 1982:

59. (1) Paragraph 23(1)(a) shall come into force in respect of Quebec on a day to be fixed by proclamation issued by the Queen or the Governor General under the Great Seal of Canada.

(2) A proclamation under subsection (1) shall be issued only where authorized by the legislative assembly or government of Quebec.

(3) This section may be repealed on the day paragraph 23(1)(a) comes into force in respect of Quebec and this Act amended and renumbered, consequentially upon the repeal of this section, by proclamation issued by the Queen or the Governor General under the Great Seal of Canada.

== History ==
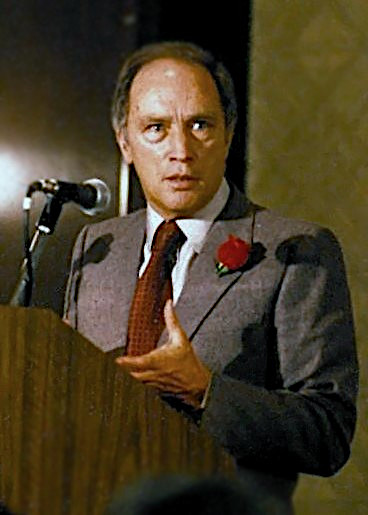
Prime Minister Pierre Trudeau was a major advocate of section 23 and minority language education.

As a strong federalist, Trudeau had fought to ensure linguistic rights in the constitution to promote national unity. Section 23 (1)(b) had its origins in a unanimous agreement between the provincial leaders and Trudeau reached in 1978 in St. Andrews, New Brunswick, in which children of citizens could receive schooling in their language. When this idea was brought to the Charter in the 1980s, Trudeau also successfully secured agreement from provincial leaders that section 23 could not be nullified by the section 33 notwithstanding clause.

When the government of Quebec had passed the Charter of the French Language in 1977, only parents who had gone to English schools in Quebec could have their children educated in English. Concerns for the erosion of the educational rights of English-speaking Quebeckers thus led to section 23(1)(b) being written so that that part of the Quebec law would become unconstitutional. This portion of the Charter of the French Language was indeed struck down by the courts in Attorney General of Quebec v. Quebec Protestant School Boards (1984). The verdict prompted the passing of Bill 86 in 1993 which amended the Charter of the French Language, stating that any child of a Canadian citizen whose parent or sibling had received English-medium education in Canada (rather than Quebec specifically) could attend English-medium schools.

While there was decreased minority language education in Quebec at the time when the Charter was adopted, several other provinces (where English Canadians were the majority) had no French language schools at all. In contrast, in 2005, all provinces had minority language education schools. In 1986, 152,225 French Canadian students outside of Quebec were going to French-language schools in accordance with section 23, and in 2001 the number was 149,042. There have been some roadblocks to minority-language education since the Charter came into effect, such as a need for more French-speaking teachers and decreased enrolment in English-language education in rural Quebec, as well as challenges from both francophone and anglophone minority parents that education of equal quality is not being provided by their provincial government. The relative lack of French-language post secondary education opportunities (colleges and universities) outside of Quebec influences the choice of some French Canadian students to switch to English language instruction, especially as they advance towards the end of their compulsory education. The rights of official language minority students remains a topic contested in provincial and federal courts, with funding for legal costs for court actions being provided by federal governments Court Challenges Program.

== Application ==
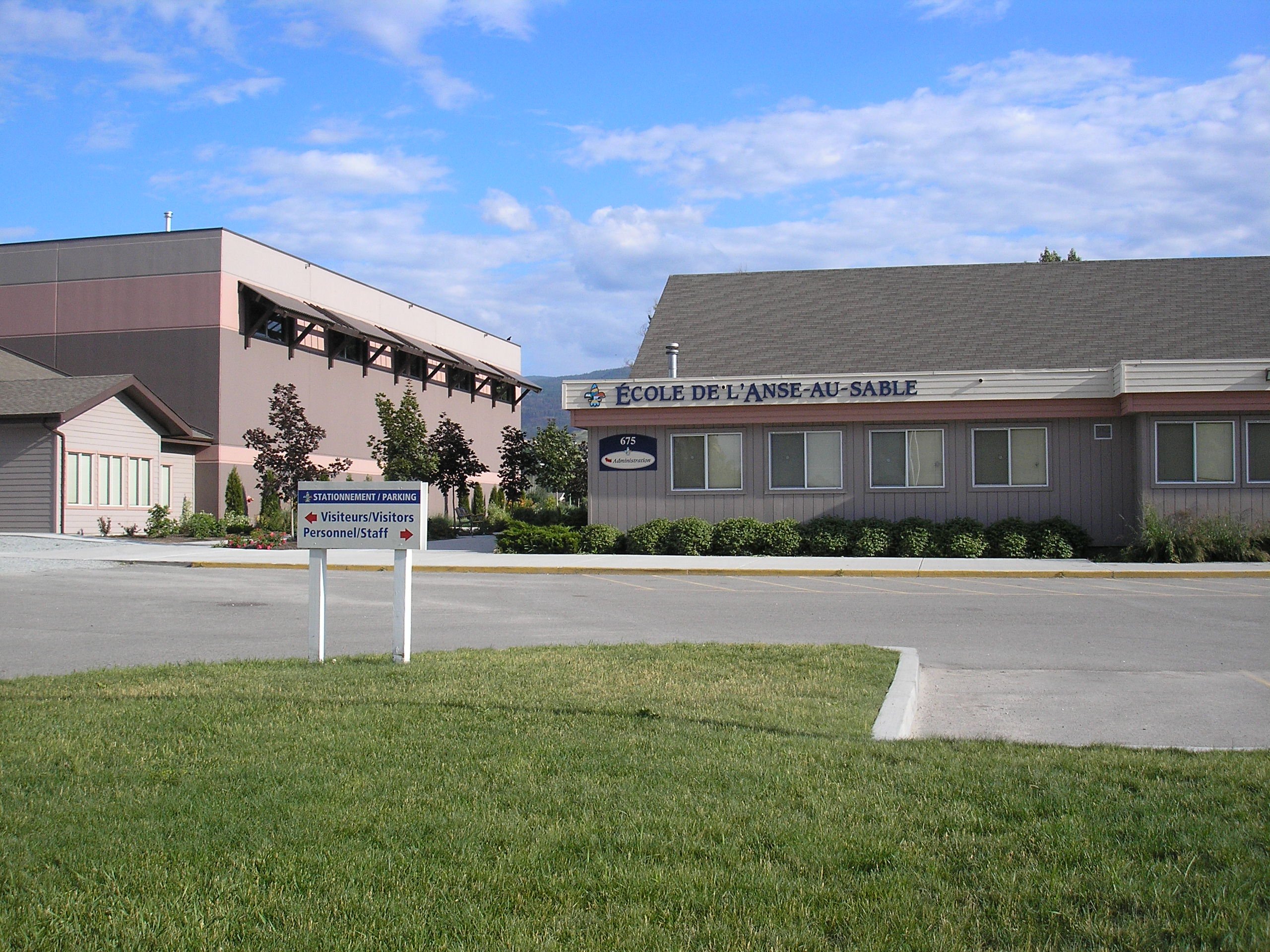
L'Anse-au-sable, a French language school in Kelowna, British Columbia. Its school board Conseil scolaire francophone de la Colombie-Britannique helps ensure those with section 23 rights receive minority language education.

Section 23 is a positive right. It has been found that section 23 thus guards against linguistic minorities being assimilated if their educational rights are denied for a long period of time; this has led to section 24 of the Charter, which provides remedies for rights infringements, to be applied flexibly and creatively. For example, in Doucet-Boudreau v. Nova Scotia (Minister of Education) (2003), it was found that the government could be forced to report to a judge as construction on schools progressed, in order to ensure the schools were built within a sufficient amount of time.

While much of section 23 can apply to Quebec, section 59 of the Constitution Act, 1982 states that section 23(1)(a) is of no force or effect there. This was a conciliatory gesture made by the authors of the Charter, which failed to obtain Quebec's agreement changes in 1982. This provision will not be valid in Quebec until the provincial government chooses to ratify it.

=== Sufficient numbers ===
While section 23 guarantees its rights to Canadian citizens who are also parents, as long as they speak English or French as a minority, the ability to exercise this right to send one's child to minority language education is limited by the possibility that the minority language community in which one lives may be too small. Sections 23(3)(a) and (b) state the "number of children" must be "sufficient to warrant" government spending for either schooling or the building of school facilities.

These limits were defined by the Supreme Court of Canada in the 1990 case Mahe v. Alberta. The Court declared that section 23 guaranteed a "sliding scale." In certain circumstances, the children whose parents could exercise the right might be so few that literally no minority language education may be provided by the government. With a greater number of children, some schools might be required to provide classrooms in which the children could receive minority language education. An even greater number would require the construction of new schools dedicated solely to minority language education.

The Court also ruled that the right to "facilities" in section 23(3)(b) could include more than classrooms and schools. Namely, a large number of children could mandate that minority language schools have their own school boards. Somewhere between the right to a school and a right to a school board was a right for the minority language community to have some members on a larger school board.

In the case Arsenault-Cameron v. Prince Edward Island (2000), the Court further defined sufficient numbers. As 49 French Canadian children were ready for minority language instruction in Summerside, Prince Edward Island, it was argued by the province that a number this low would only require school buses to transport them to a nearby French language school, rather than the construction of a separate school. The Court, however, ruled that if a new school were actually built, it could draw in more people than those whose families had previously expressed interest, and thus the number could be somewhat fewer than 100. While even a school this small might struggle with providing certain educational services, protecting the culture of the minority language community was considered too important and the number of students was ruled sufficient for the building of a new school.

=== Manitoba ===
The decision to allow for minority education rights along a sliding scale had already been nascent in Manitoba through the adoption of the Laurier-Greenway compromise of 1896. This compromise came in response to what was argued to be unconstitutional provincial school legislation (Public Schools Act of 1890) in relation to the constitutionally entrenched Manitoba Act, 1870. In Manitoba, where the Public Schools Act had been reformed along the lines of minority versus majority language rights and a changing proportion of English to French (where English speakers out-numbered French by the 1890s), the Laurier-Greenway compromise allowed for a school districts on a community-by-community basis to offer French language instruction if the French population was large enough and requested such instruction.

In 1916 under Premier T.C. Norris, the prior compromise was rescinded and the Franco-Manitoban minority lost their right to receive instruction in French in Manitoba's public schools. Section 93 of the Constitution Act, 1867 in the province's opinion had been contravened by the Laurier-Greenway compromise and no longer had legal standing. Moreover, in section 93 the province had ultimate authority to decide on minority language instruction. The latter remained the practice in place until two changes were made to Manitoba's Public Schools Act: in 1966 and 1970, when French language instruction was once again recognized as an official language of instruction.

Manitoba's minority French language instruction rights have developed since the introduction of the Charter and section 23 to a point where they have allowed for the inclusion of a separate school board (La Division Scolaire Franco-Manitobaine) that is fully funded by the provincial treasury and operates throughout the Province. Significant with regards to the province's interpretation of section 23 is how the "number of students" and not "mother tongue" is the basis upon which French language (minority) instruction rights are respected. Minority language instruction in Manitoba is in transition and still presents various legal issues and related constitutionally charged questions (see Manitoba Act 1870, Louis Riel, Manitoba Schools Question, Laurier-Greenway Compromise).

== See also ==
- Legal dispute over Quebec's language policy
