= List of communities in Alberta =

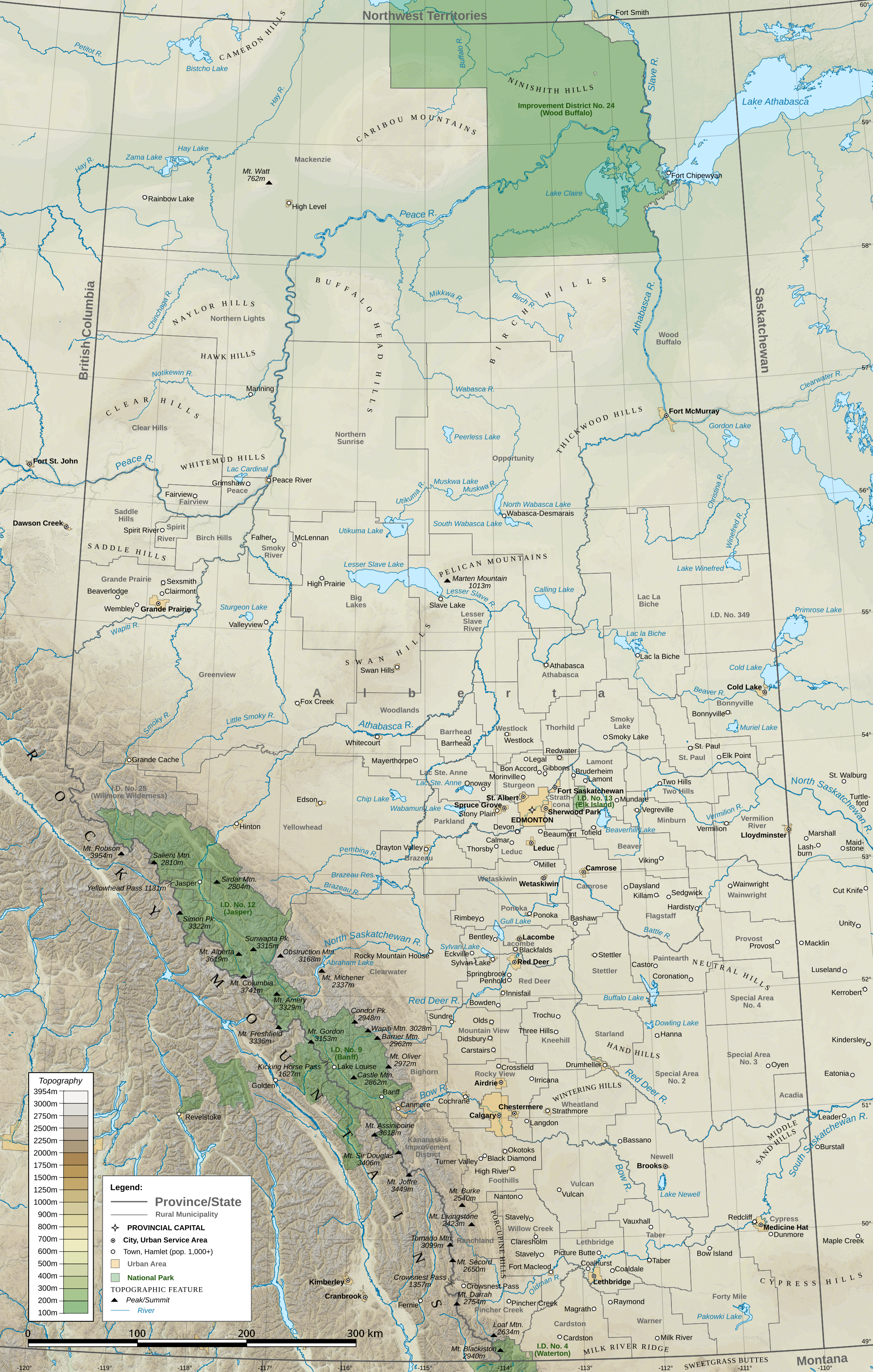
Rural and specialized municipalities, cities, towns, and select hamlets in Alberta

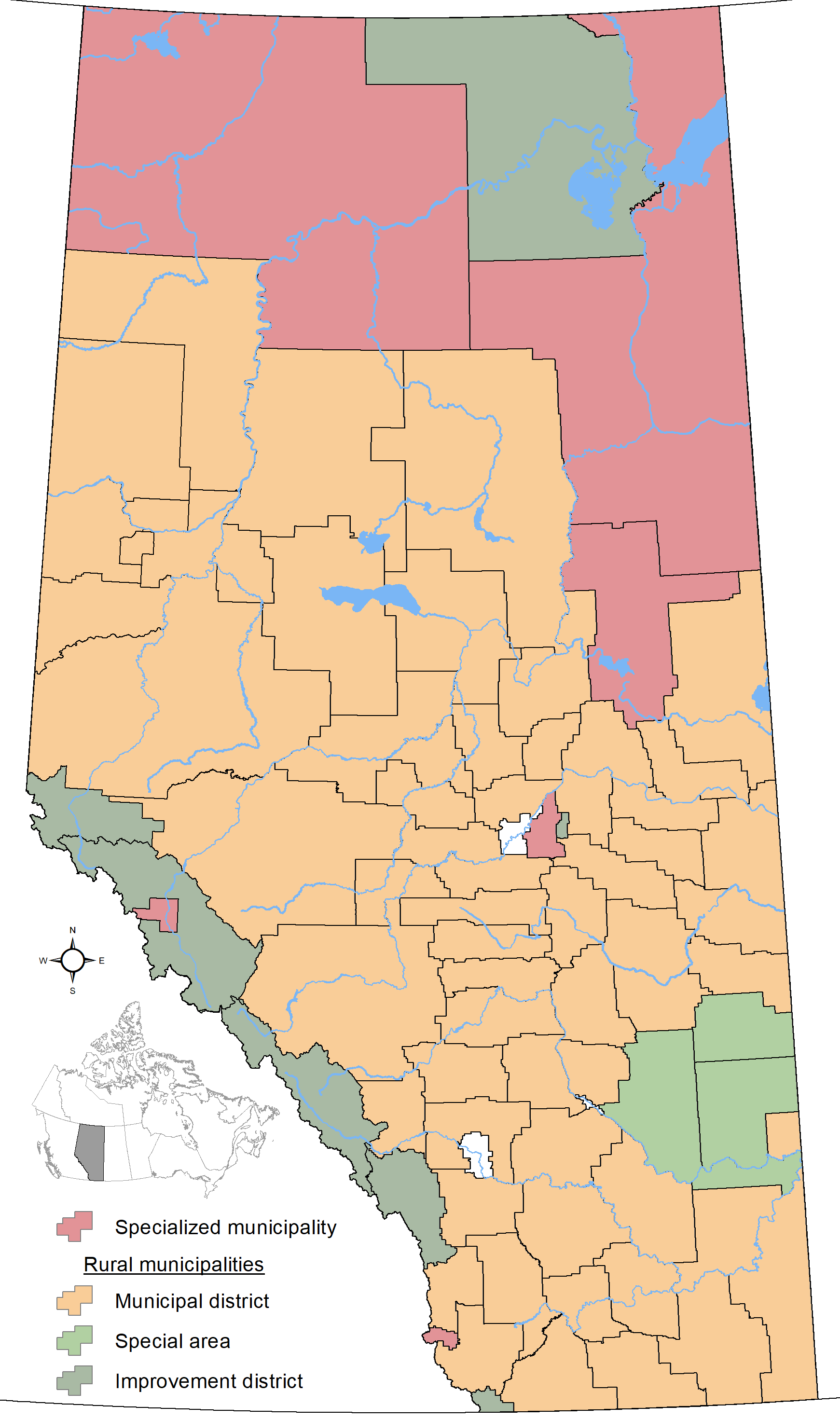
Distribution of Alberta's 6 specialized municipalities (red) and 74 rural municipalities, which include municipal districts that are often branded as counties (orange), improvement districts (dark green) and special areas (light green) (2020)

The province of Alberta, Canada, is divided into ten types of local governments – urban municipalities (including cities, towns, villages and summer villages), specialized municipalities, rural municipalities (including municipal districts (often named as counties), improvement districts, and special areas), Métis settlements, and Indian reserves. All types of municipalities are governed by local residents and were incorporated under various provincial acts, with the exception of improvement districts (governed by either the provincial or federal government), and Alberta's Indian reserves (governed by local band governments under federal jurisdiction).

Alberta also has numerous unincorporated communities (including urban service areas, hamlets and a townsite) that are not independent municipalities in their own right. However, they are all recognized as sub-municipal entities by Ministry of Municipal Affairs under the jurisdiction of specialized municipalities or rural municipalities, with the exception of the lone townsite (its jurisdiction is shared with an Indian reserve that surrounds it).

With the exception of Métis settlements, Statistics Canada recognizes all of Alberta's municipalities as census subdivisions and groups them into 19 census divisions based on geography. Within census divisions, Statistics Canada groups some of Alberta's municipalities/census subdivisions into two census metropolitan areas (CMAs) or 12 census agglomerations (CAs) for enumeration purposes. All CMAs include large urban centres and surrounding census subdivisions. All CAs also include large urban centres and in some cases their surrounding census subdivisions.

With the exception of Indian reserves, the administration of municipalities in Alberta is regulated by the Municipal Government Act, the Special Areas Act and the Metis Settlements Act.

As of 2019, the combined unofficial population of all of Alberta's municipalities was 4,271,759.

== Municipalities ==
=== Urban municipalities ===
==== Cities ====
According to Section 82 of the Municipal Government Act (MGA), an area may incorporate as a city if:

- it has a population of 10,000 people or more; and
- the majority of its buildings are on parcels of land smaller than 1,850 m^{2} (19,900 sq ft).

Essentially, cities are formed from urban communities with populations of at least 10,000 people.

Alberta currently has a total of 19 cities with a combined population totalling 2,959,559 as of 2019.

List of cities in Alberta
| Name | Region | Incorporation date (city) | Council size | 2021 Census of Population | | | | |
| Name | Region | Incorporation date (city) | Council size | Population (2021) | Population (2016) | Change | Land area (km^{2}) | Population density (per km^{2}) |
|---|---|---|---|---|---|---|---|---|
| Airdrie | Calgary Metro | January 1, 1985 | 7 | 74,100 | 61,581 | +20.3% | 84.39 | 878.1 |
| Beaumont (Note: Beaumont is Alberta's newest city, incorporated on January 1, 2019.) | Edmonton Metro | January 1, 2019 | 7 | 20,888 | 17,457 | +19.7% | 24.70 | 845.7 |
| Brooks (Note: Brooks is Alberta's smallest city by land area.) | Southern | September 1, 2005 | 7 | 14,924 | 14,451 | +3.3% | 18.21 | 819.5 |
| Calgary (Note: Calgary is Canada's third-largest city, Alberta's largest city by both population and area, and was Alberta's first city, incorporated on January 1, 1894. The Calgary census metropolitan area (CMA) includes the cities of Airdrie, Calgary and Chestermere.) | Calgary Metro | January 1, 1894 | 15 | 1,306,784 | 1,239,220 | +5.5% | 820.62 | 1,592.4 |
| Camrose | Central | January 1, 1955 | 9 | 18,772 | 18,742 | +0.2% | 41.67 | 450.5 |
| Chestermere (Note: Chestermere was known as Chestermere Lake prior to March 1, 1993. It is the only city in Alberta to have previously hold summer village status.) | Calgary Metro | January 1, 2015 | 7 | 22,163 | 19,887 | +11.4% | 32.83 | 675.1 |
| Cold Lake | Northern | October 1, 2000 | 7 | 15,661 | 14,976 | +4.6% | 66.61 | 235.1 |
| Edmonton (Note: Edmonton is Canada's fifth-largest city and Alberta's capital. The Edmonton CMA includes the cities of Beaumont, Edmonton, Fort Saskatchewan, Leduc, Spruce Grove and St. Albert.) | Edmonton Metro | October 8, 1904 | 13 | 1,010,899 | 933,088 | +8.3% | 765.61 | 1,320.4 |
| Fort Saskatchewan | Edmonton Metro | July 1, 1985 | 7 | 27,088 | 24,169 | +12.1% | 56.50 | 479.4 |
| Grande Prairie | Northern | January 1, 1958 | 9 | 64,141 | 63,166 | +1.5% | 132.71 | 483.3 |
| Lacombe | Central | September 5, 2010 | 7 | 13,396 | 13,057 | +2.6% | 20.59 | 650.6 |
| Leduc | Edmonton Metro | September 1, 1983 | 7 | 34,094 | 29,993 | +13.7% | 42.25 | 807.0 |
| Lethbridge | Southern | May 9, 1906 | 9 | 98,406 | 92,729 | +6.1% | 121.12 | 812.5 |
| Lloydminster (part) (Note: The balance of Lloydminster is located within Saskatchewan.) | Central | January 1, 1958 | 7 | 19,739 | 19,645 | +0.5% | 23.98 | 823.1 |
| Medicine Hat | Southern | May 9, 1906 | 9 | 63,271 | 63,260 | 0.0% | 111.97 | 565.1 |
| Red Deer | Central | March 25, 1913 | 9 | 100,844 | 100,418 | +0.4% | 104.34 | 966.5 |
| Spruce Grove | Edmonton Metro | March 1, 1986 | 7 | 37,645 | 34,108 | +10.4% | 37.52 | 1,003.3 |
| St. Albert | Edmonton Metro | January 1, 1977 | 7 | 68,232 | 65,589 | +4.0% | 47.84 | 1,426.3 |
| Wetaskiwin (Note: Wetaskiwin is Alberta's smallest city by population.) | Central | May 9, 1906 | 7 | 12,594 | 12,655 | −0.5% | 18.75 | 671.7 |
| Total cities | — | — | 157 | 3,023,641 | 2,838,191 | +6.5% | 2,572.21 | 1,175.5 |

==== Towns ====
According to Section 81 of the Municipal Government Act (MGA), an area may incorporate as a town if:

- it has a population of 1,000 people or more; and
- the majority of its buildings are on parcels of land smaller than 1,850 m^{2} (19,900 sq ft).

Essentially, towns are formed from urban communities with populations of at least 1,000 people. When a town's population exceeds 10,000 people, its council may apply to change its status to that of a city, but the change in incorporated status is not mandatory.

Communities with shrinking populations are allowed to retain town status even if the number of residents falls below the 1,000 limit. Some of Alberta's towns have never reached a population of 1,000 people, but were incorporated as towns before the current requirement to have a population of 1,000 or more.

Alberta currently has a total of 107 towns, with a combined population totalling 466,470 as of 2019.

List of towns in Alberta
| Name | Specialized/rural municipality | Incorporation date (town) | 2021 Census of Population | | | | |
| Name | Specialized/rural municipality | Incorporation date (town) | Population (2021) | Population (2016) | Change | Land area (km^{2}) | Population density (/km^{2}) |
|---|---|---|---|---|---|---|---|
| Athabasca (Note: Athabasca was formerly known as Athabasca Landing prior to August 4, 1913.) | Athabasca County | September 19, 1911 | 2,759 | 2,965 | −6.9% | 17.79 | 155.1 |
| Banff | Improvement District No. 9 (Banff) | January 1, 1990 | 8,305 | 7,851 | +5.8% | 4.08 | 2,035.5 |
| Barrhead | Barrhead No. 11, County of | November 26, 1946 | 4,320 | 4,579 | −5.7% | 8.20 | 526.8 |
| Bashaw | Camrose County | May 1, 1964 | 848 | 830 | +2.2% | 2.72 | 311.8 |
| Bassano | Newell, County of | January 16, 1911 | 1,216 | 1,206 | +0.8% | 5.23 | 232.5 |
| Beaverlodge | Grande Prairie No. 1, County of | January 24, 1956 | 2,271 | 2,465 | −7.9% | 5.38 | 422.1 |
| Bentley | Lacombe County | January 1, 2001 | 1,042 | 1,078 | −3.3% | 2.24 | 465.2 |
| Blackfalds | Lacombe County | April 1, 1980 | 10,470 | 9,328 | +12.2% | 16.58 | 631.5 |
| Bon Accord | Sturgeon County | November 20, 1979 | 1,461 | 1,529 | −4.4% | 3.99 | 366.2 |
| Bonnyville | Bonnyville No. 87, M.D. of | February 3, 1948 | 6,404 | 5,975 | +7.2% | 14.17 | 451.9 |
| Bow Island | Forty Mile No. 8, County of | February 1, 1912 | 2,036 | 1,983 | +2.7% | 5.68 | 358.5 |
| Bowden | Red Deer County | September 1, 1981 | 1,280 | 1,240 | +3.2% | 3.46 | 369.9 |
| Bruderheim | Lamont County | September 17, 1980 | 1,329 | 1,323 | +0.5% | 9.28 | 143.2 |
| Calmar | Leduc County | January 19, 1954 | 2,183 | 2,228 | −2.0% | 4.67 | 467.5 |
| Canmore | Bighorn No. 8, M.D. of Kananaskis Improvement District | June 1, 1966 | 15,990 | 13,992 | +14.3% | 68.47 | 233.5 |
| Cardston | Cardston County | July 2, 1901 | 3,724 | 3,585 | +3.9% | 8.58 | 434.0 |
| Carstairs | Mountain View County | September 1, 1966 | 4,898 | 4,077 | +20.1% | 11.77 | 416.1 |
| Castor | Paintearth No. 18, County of | June 27, 1910 | 803 | 929 | −13.6% | 2.61 | 307.7 |
| Claresholm | Willow Creek No. 26, M.D. of | August 31, 1905 | 3,804 | 3,790 | +0.4% | 10.51 | 361.9 |
| Coaldale | Lethbridge County | January 7, 1952 | 8,771 | 8,331 | +5.3% | 13.58 | 645.9 |
| Coalhurst | Lethbridge County | June 1, 1995 | 2,869 | 2,668 | +7.5% | 3.08 | 931.5 |
| Cochrane | Rocky View County | February 15, 1971 | 32,199 | 25,853 | +24.5% | 31.58 | 1,019.6 |
| Coronation | Paintearth No. 18, County of | April 29, 1912 | 868 | 940 | −7.7% | 3.57 | 243.1 |
| Crossfield | Rocky View County | August 1, 1980 | 3,599 | 2,983 | +20.7% | 11.89 | 302.7 |
| Daysland | Flagstaff County | April 2, 1907 | 789 | 824 | −4.2% | 1.77 | 445.8 |
| Devon | Leduc County | February 24, 1950 | 6,545 | 6,578 | −0.5% | 14.26 | 459.0 |
| Diamond Valley | Foothills County | January 1, 2023 | 5,341 | 5,264 | +1.5% | 12.57 | 424.9 |
| Didsbury | Mountain View County | September 27, 1906 | 5,070 | 5,268 | −3.8% | 16.12 | 314.5 |
| Drayton Valley | Brazeau County | February 1, 1957 | 7,291 | 7,235 | +0.8% | 30.90 | 236.0 |
| Drumheller (Note: Drumheller originally incorporated as a city on April 3, 1930, but reverted from city status as a result of its amalgamation with the M.D. of Badlands No. 7 in 1998.) | Kneehill County; Special Area No. 2 Starland County; Wheatland County | March 2, 1916; January 1, 1998 | 7,909 | 7,982 | −0.9% | 107.56 | 73.5 |
| Eckville | Lacombe County | July 1, 1966 | 1,014 | 1,125 | −9.9% | 1.61 | 629.8 |
| Edson | Yellowhead County | September 21, 1911 | 8,374 | 8,414 | −0.5% | 29.43 | 284.5 |
| Elk Point | St. Paul No. 19, County of | January 1, 1962 | 1,399 | 1,452 | −3.7% | 4.91 | 284.9 |
| Fairview | Fairview No. 136, M.D. of | April 25, 1949 | 2,817 | 2,998 | −6.0% | 10.67 | 264.0 |
| Falher | Smoky River No. 130, M.D. of | January 1, 1955 | 1,001 | 1,047 | −4.4% | 2.83 | 353.7 |
| Fort Macleod (Note: Fort Macleod, which grew around the NWMP's Fort Macleod barracks (built 1874), was formerly known as Macleod prior to April 1, 1952.) | Willow Creek No. 26, M.D. of | March 29, 1912 | 3,297 | 2,967 | +11.1% | 22.54 | 146.3 |
| Fox Creek | Greenview No. 16, M.D. of | September 1, 1983 | 1,639 | 1,971 | −16.8% | 12.26 | 133.7 |
| Gibbons | Sturgeon County | April 1, 1977 | 3,218 | 3,159 | +1.9% | 9.46 | 340.2 |
| Grimshaw | Peace No. 135, M.D. of | February 2, 1953 | 2,601 | 2,718 | −4.3% | 7.08 | 367.4 |
| Hanna | Special Area No. 2 | April 14, 1914 | 2,394 | 2,559 | −6.4% | 8.40 | 285.0 |
| Hardisty | Flagstaff County | November 9, 1910 | 548 | 554 | −1.1% | 4.50 | 121.8 |
| High Level | Mackenzie County | September 1, 1983 | 3,922 | 3,159 | +24.2% | 28.70 | 136.7 |
| High Prairie | Big Lakes County | January 10, 1950 | 2,380 | 2,564 | −7.2% | 7.01 | 339.5 |
| High River | Foothills No. 31, M.D. of | February 12, 1906 | 14,324 | 13,594 | +5.4% | 22.19 | 645.5 |
| Hinton | Yellowhead County | December 29, 1958 | 9,817 | 9,882 | −0.7% | 33.32 | 294.6 |
| Innisfail | Red Deer County | November 20, 1903 | 7,985 | 7,847 | +1.8% | 19.39 | 411.8 |
| Irricana | Rocky View County | June 9, 2005 | 1,179 | 1,216 | −3.0% | 3.23 | 365.0 |
| Killam | Flagstaff County | May 1, 1965 | 918 | 989 | −7.2% | 6.40 | 143.4 |
| Lamont | Lamont County | May 31, 1968 | 1,744 | 1,774 | −1.7% | 9.14 | 190.8 |
| Legal | Sturgeon County | January 1, 1998 | 1,232 | 1,345 | −8.4% | 3.18 | 387.4 |
| Magrath | Cardston County | July 24, 1907 | 2,481 | 2,374 | +4.5% | 5.88 | 421.9 |
| Manning | Northern Lights, County of | January 1, 1957 | 1,126 | 1,183 | −4.8% | 3.71 | 303.5 |
| Mayerthorpe | Lac Ste. Anne County | March 20, 1961 | 1,259 | 1,320 | −4.6% | 4.39 | 286.8 |
| McLennan | Smoky River No. 130, M.D. of | February 11, 1948 | 695 | 701 | −0.9% | 3.58 | 194.1 |
| Milk River | Warner No. 5, County of | February 7, 1956 | 824 | 827 | −0.4% | 2.42 | 340.5 |
| Millet | Wetaskiwin No. 10, County of | September 1, 1983 | 1,890 | 1,955 | −3.3% | 6.62 | 285.5 |
| Morinville | Sturgeon County | April 21, 1911 | 10,385 | 9,848 | +5.5% | 11.15 | 931.4 |
| Mundare | Lamont County | January 4, 1951 | 689 | 852 | −19.1% | 4.12 | 167.2 |
| Nanton | Willow Creek No. 26, M.D. of | August 9, 1907 | 2,167 | 2,181 | −0.6% | 5.11 | 424.1 |
| Nobleford | Lethbridge County | February 28, 2018 | 1,438 | 1,278 | +12.5% | 1.69 | 850.9 |
| Okotoks | Foothills No. 31, M.D. of | June 1, 1904 | 30,405 | 29,016 | +4.8% | 38.55 | 788.7 |
| Olds | Mountain View County | July 1, 1905 | 9,209 | 9,184 | +0.3% | 14.92 | 617.2 |
| Onoway | Lac Ste. Anne County | September 1, 2005 | 966 | 1,029 | −6.1% | 3.31 | 291.8 |
| Oyen | Special Area No. 3 | September 1, 1965 | 917 | 1,001 | −8.4% | 5.15 | 178.1 |
| Peace River (Note: Peace River was formerly known as Peace River Crossing prior to May 22, 1916.) | Northern Lights, County of Northern Sunrise County; Peace No. 135, M.D. of | December 1, 1919 | 6,619 | 6,842 | −3.3% | 25.34 | 261.2 |
| Penhold | Red Deer County | September 1, 1980 | 3,484 | 3,287 | +6.0% | 11.20 | 311.1 |
| Picture Butte | Lethbridge County | January 1, 1960 | 1,930 | 1,810 | +6.6% | 3.02 | 639.1 |
| Pincher Creek | Pincher Creek No. 9, M.D. of | May 12, 1906 | 3,622 | 3,642 | −0.5% | 9.87 | 367.0 |
| Ponoka | Ponoka County | October 15, 1904 | 7,331 | 7,229 | +1.4% | 17.22 | 425.7 |
| Provost | Provost No. 52, M.D. of | December 29, 1952 | 1,900 | 1,998 | −4.9% | 4.75 | 400.0 |
| Rainbow Lake | Mackenzie County | September 1, 1995 | 495 | 795 | −37.7% | 10.76 | 46.0 |
| Raymond | Warner No. 5, County of | July 1, 1903 | 4,199 | 3,713 | +13.1% | 7.63 | 550.3 |
| Redcliff | Cypress County | August 5, 1912 | 5,581 | 5,600 | −0.3% | 16.15 | 345.6 |
| Redwater | Sturgeon County | December 31, 1950 | 2,115 | 2,053 | +3.0% | 19.93 | 106.1 |
| Rimbey | Ponoka County | December 13, 1948 | 2,470 | 2,567 | −3.8% | 11.38 | 217.0 |
| Rocky Mountain House | Clearwater County | August 31, 1939 | 6,765 | 6,635 | +2.0% | 13.05 | 518.4 |
| Sedgewick | Flagstaff County | May 1, 1966 | 761 | 811 | −6.2% | 2.71 | 280.8 |
| Sexsmith | Grande Prairie No. 1, County of | October 15, 1979 | 2,427 | 2,620 | −7.4% | 13.01 | 186.5 |
| Slave Lake | Lesser Slave River No. 124, M.D. of | August 2, 1965 | 6,836 | 6,651 | +2.8% | 14.31 | 477.7 |
| Smoky Lake | Smoky Lake County | February 1, 1962 | 1,127 | 964 | +16.9% | 4.26 | 264.6 |
| Spirit River | Spirit River No. 133, M.D. of | September 18, 1951 | 849 | 995 | −14.7% | 3.11 | 273.0 |
| St. Paul (Note: St. Paul was formerly known as St. Paul de Métis prior to December 15, 1932.) | St. Paul No. 19, County of | December 15, 1936 | 5,863 | 5,827 | +0.6% | 8.64 | 678.6 |
| Stavely | Willow Creek No. 26, M.D. of | May 25, 1912 | 544 | 541 | +0.6% | 1.78 | 305.6 |
| Stettler | Stettler No. 6, County of | November 23, 1906 | 5,695 | 5,952 | −4.3% | 13.19 | 431.8 |
| Stony Plain | Parkland County | December 10, 1908 | 17,993 | 17,189 | +4.7% | 35.45 | 507.6 |
| Strathmore | Wheatland County | July 6, 1911 | 14,339 | 13,756 | +4.2% | 26.98 | 531.5 |
| Sundre | Mountain View County | January 1, 1956 | 2,672 | 2,729 | −2.1% | 10.84 | 246.5 |
| Swan Hills | Big Lakes County | January 1, 1967 | 1,201 | 1,301 | −7.7% | 25.87 | 46.4 |
| Sylvan Lake | Red Deer County | May 20, 1946 | 15,995 | 14,816 | +8.0% | 23.09 | 692.7 |
| Taber | Taber, M.D. of | July 1, 1907 | 8,862 | 8,428 | +5.1% | 19.32 | 458.7 |
| Thorsby | Leduc County | January 1, 2017 | 967 | 985 | −1.8% | 3.80 | 254.5 |
| Three Hills | Kneehill County | January 1, 1929 | 3,042 | 3,212 | −5.3% | 6.74 | 451.3 |
| Tofield | Beaver County | September 10, 1909 | 2,045 | 2,081 | −1.7% | 8.21 | 249.1 |
| Trochu | Kneehill County | August 1, 1962 | 998 | 1,058 | −5.7% | 2.78 | 359.0 |
| Two Hills | Two Hills No. 21, County of | January 1, 1955 | 1,416 | 1,352 | +4.7% | 3.11 | 455.3 |
| Valleyview | Greenview No. 16, M.D. of | February 5, 1957 | 1,673 | 1,863 | −10.2% | 9.17 | 182.4 |
| Vauxhall | Taber, M.D. of | January 1, 1961 | 1,286 | 1,222 | +5.2% | 2.71 | 474.5 |
| Vegreville | Minburn No. 27, County of | August 15, 1906 | 5,689 | 5,708 | −0.3% | 14.08 | 404.0 |
| Vermilion | Vermilion River, County of | August 27, 1906 | 3,948 | 4,084 | −3.3% | 12.72 | 310.4 |
| Viking | Beaver County | November 10, 1952 | 986 | 1,083 | −9.0% | 3.45 | 285.8 |
| Vulcan | Vulcan County | June 15, 1921 | 1,769 | 1,917 | −7.7% | 6.28 | 281.7 |
| Wainwright | Wainwright No. 61, M.D. of | July 14, 1910 | 6,606 | 6,285 | +5.1% | 12.17 | 542.8 |
| Wembley | Grande Prairie No. 1, County of | August 1, 1980 | 1,432 | 1,516 | −5.5% | 4.74 | 302.1 |
| Westlock | Westlock County | January 7, 1947 | 4,921 | 5,101 | −3.5% | 13.37 | 368.1 |
| Whitecourt | Woodlands County | December 20, 1971 | 9,927 | 10,209 | −2.8% | 29.51 | 336.4 |
| Total towns | — | — | 471,028 | 455,389 | +3.4% | 1,294.84 | 363.8 |

==== Villages ====
According to Section 80 of the Municipal Government Act (MGA), an area may incorporate as a village if:

- it has a population of 300 people or more; and
- the majority of its buildings are on parcels of land smaller than 1,850 m^{2} (19,900 sq ft).

Essentially, villages are formed from urban communities with populations of at least 300 people. When a village's population exceeds 1,000 people, its council may apply to change its status to that of a town, but the change in incorporated status is not mandatory.

Communities with shrinking populations are allowed to retain village status even if the number of residents falls below the 300 limit. Some of Alberta's villages have never reached a population of 300 people, but were incorporated as villages before there was a requirement to have a population of 300 or more.

Alberta currently has a total of 81 villages, with a combined population totalling 34,600 as of 2021.

List of villages in Alberta
| Name | Rural municipality | Incorporation date (village) | 2021 Census of Population | | | | |
| Name | Rural municipality | Incorporation date (village) | Population (2021) | Population (2016) | Change | Land area (km²) | Population density (/km²) |
|---|---|---|---|---|---|---|---|
| Acme | Kneehill County | July 7, 1910 | 606 | 653 | −7.2% | 2.49 | 243.4 |
| Alberta Beach | Lac Ste. Anne County | January 1, 1999 | 864 | 1,018 | −15.1% | 2.02 | 427.7 |
| Alix | Lacombe County | June 3, 1907 | 774 | 734 | +5.4% | 3.11 | 248.9 |
| Alliance | Flagstaff County | August 26, 1918 | 166 | 159 | +4.4% | 0.62 | 267.7 |
| Amisk | Provost No. 52, MD of | January 1, 1956 | 219 | 204 | +7.4% | 0.76 | 288.2 |
| Andrew | Lamont County | June 24, 1930 | 366 | 425 | −13.9% | 1.18 | 310.2 |
| Arrowwood | Vulcan County | May 13, 1926 | 188 | 207 | −9.2% | 0.75 | 250.7 |
| Barnwell | Taber, MD of | January 1, 1980 | 978 | 947 | +3.3% | 1.5 | 652.0 |
| Barons | Lethbridge County | May 6, 1910 | 313 | 341 | −8.2% | 0.81 | 386.4 |
| Bawlf | Camrose County | October 12, 1906 | 412 | 422 | −2.4% | 0.89 | 462.9 |
| Beiseker | Rocky View County | February 23, 1921 | 754 | 819 | −7.9% | 2.85 | 264.6 |
| Berwyn | Peace No. 135, MD of | November 28, 1936 | 577 | 538 | +7.2% | 1.57 | 367.5 |
| Big Valley | Stettler No. 6, County of | March 9, 1942 | 331 | 346 | −4.3% | 1.86 | 178.0 |
| Bittern Lake (Note: Bittern Lake was formerly known as Rosenroll prior to December 16, 1911.) | Camrose County | November 2, 1904 | 216 | 220 | −1.8% | 6.57 | 32.9 |
| Boyle | Athabasca County | December 31, 1953 | 825 | 845 | −2.4% | 7.12 | 115.9 |
| Breton | Brazeau County | January 1, 1957 | 567 | 574 | −1.2% | 1.72 | 329.7 |
| Carbon | Kneehill County | November 18, 1912 | 492 | 454 | +8.4% | 1.99 | 247.2 |
| Carmangay | Vulcan County | March 4, 1936 | 269 | 242 | +11.2% | 1.8 | 149.4 |
| Champion | Vulcan County | May 27, 1911 | 351 | 317 | +10.7% | 0.88 | 398.9 |
| Chauvin | Wainwright No. 61, MD of | December 30, 1912 | 304 | 335 | −9.3% | 2.22 | 136.9 |
| Chipman | Lamont County | October 21, 1913 | 246 | 274 | −10.2% | 9.6 | 25.6 |
| Clive | Lacombe County | January 9, 1912 | 775 | 715 | +8.4% | 2.17 | 357.1 |
| Clyde | Westlock County | January 28, 1914 | 415 | 430 | −3.5% | 1.28 | 324.2 |
| Consort | Special Area No. 4 | September 23, 1912 | 644 | 729 | −11.7% | 3.02 | 213.2 |
| Coutts | Warner No. 5, County of | January 1, 1960 | 224 | 245 | −8.6% | 1.18 | 189.8 |
| Cowley | Pincher Creek No. 9, MD of | August 16, 1906 | 216 | 209 | +3.3% | 1.36 | 158.8 |
| Cremona | Mountain View County | January 1, 1955 | 437 | 444 | −1.6% | 1.93 | 226.4 |
| Czar | Provost No. 52, MD of | November 12, 1917 | 248 | 202 | +22.8% | 1.12 | 221.4 |
| Delburne | Red Deer County | January 17, 1913 | 919 | 892 | +3.0% | 3.79 | 242.5 |
| Delia (Note: Delia was formerly known as Highland prior to December 9, 1915.) | Starland County | July 20, 1914 | 152 | 216 | −29.6% | 1.33 | 114.3 |
| Donalda | Stettler No. 6, County of | December 30, 1912 | 226 | 219 | +3.2% | 0.97 | 233.0 |
| Donnelly | Smoky River No. 130, MD of | January 1, 1956 | 338 | 359 | −5.8% | 1.26 | 268.3 |
| Duchess | Newell, County of | May 12, 1921 | 1,053 | 1,085 | −2.9% | 1.93 | 545.6 |
| Edberg | Camrose County | February 4, 1930 | 126 | 151 | −16.6% | 0.35 | 360.0 |
| Edgerton | Wainwright No. 61, MD of | September 11, 1917 | 385 | 384 | +0.3% | 2.01 | 191.5 |
| Elnora | Red Deer County | July 22, 1929 | 288 | 298 | −3.4% | 1.5 | 192.0 |
| Empress | Special Area No. 2 | February 5, 1914 | 148 | 135 | +9.6% | 1.58 | 93.7 |
| Foremost | Forty Mile No. 8, County of | December 31, 1950 | 630 | 541 | +16.5% | 2.13 | 295.8 |
| Forestburg | Flagstaff County | August 21, 1919 | 807 | 880 | −8.3% | 4.04 | 199.8 |
| Girouxville | Smoky River No. 130, MD of | December 31, 1951 | 278 | 219 | +26.9% | 0.66 | 421.2 |
| Glendon | Bonnyville No. 87, MD of | January 1, 1956 | 338 | 493 | −31.4% | 1.99 | 169.8 |
| Glenwood | Cardston County | January 1, 1961 | 272 | 316 | −13.9% | 1.37 | 198.5 |
| Hay Lakes (Note: Hay Lakes was formerly known as Hay Lake prior to January 1, 1932.) | Camrose County | April 17, 1928 | 456 | 495 | −7.9% | 0.59 | 772.9 |
| Heisler | Flagstaff County | January 1, 1961 | 135 | 160 | −15.6% | 0.63 | 214.3 |
| Hill Spring | Cardston County | January 1, 1961 | 168 | 162 | +3.7% | 0.96 | 175.0 |
| Hines Creek | Clear Hills County | December 31, 1951 | 335 | 346 | −3.2% | 4.88 | 68.6 |
| Holden | Beaver County | April 14, 1909 | 338 | 350 | −3.4% | 1.55 | 218.1 |
| Hughenden | Provost No. 52, MD of | December 27, 1917 | 213 | 243 | −12.3% | 0.78 | 273.1 |
| Hussar | Wheatland County | April 20, 1928 | 187 | 193 | −3.1% | 1 | 187.0 |
| Innisfree | Minburn No. 27, County of | March 11, 1911 | 193 | 220 | −12.3% | 1.01 | 191.1 |
| Irma | Wainwright No. 61, MD of | May 30, 1912 | 477 | 521 | −8.4% | 1.32 | 361.4 |
| Kitscoty | Vermilion River, County of | March 22, 1911 | 852 | 925 | −7.9% | 1.51 | 564.2 |
| Linden | Kneehill County | January 1, 1964 | 704 | 828 | −15.0% | 2.55 | 276.1 |
| Lomond | Vulcan County | February 16, 1916 | 178 | 166 | +7.2% | 1.19 | 149.6 |
| Longview | Foothills County | January 1, 1964 | 297 | 307 | −3.3% | 1.1 | 270.0 |
| Lougheed | Flagstaff County | November 7, 1911 | 225 | 256 | −12.1% | 2 | 112.5 |
| Mannville | Minburn No. 27, County of | December 29, 1906 | 765 | 828 | −7.6% | 1.64 | 466.5 |
| Marwayne | Vermilion River, County of | December 31, 1952 | 543 | 564 | −3.7% | 1.6 | 339.4 |
| Milo | Vulcan County | May 7, 1931 | 136 | 91 | +49.5% | 0.96 | 141.7 |
| Morrin | Starland County | April 16, 1920 | 205 | 240 | −14.6% | 0.67 | 306.0 |
| Munson | Starland County | May 5, 1911 | 170 | 192 | −11.5% | 2.56 | 66.4 |
| Myrnam | Two Hills No. 21, County of | August 22, 1930 | 257 | 339 | −24.2% | 2.75 | 93.5 |
| Nampa | Northern Sunrise County | January 1, 1958 | 367 | 364 | +0.8% | 1.69 | 217.2 |
| Paradise Valley | Vermilion River, County of | January 1, 1964 | 153 | 179 | −14.5% | 0.63 | 242.9 |
| Rockyford | Wheatland County | March 28, 1919 | 395 | 316 | +25.0% | 1.04 | 379.8 |
| Rosalind | Camrose County | January 1, 1966 | 162 | 188 | −13.8% | 0.62 | 261.3 |
| Rosemary | Newell, County of | December 31, 1951 | 370 | 396 | −6.6% | 0.59 | 627.1 |
| Rycroft | Spirit River No. 133, MD of | March 15, 1944 | 550 | 612 | −10.1% | 1.85 | 297.3 |
| Ryley (Note: Ryley was also known as Equity in 1909.) | Beaver County | April 2, 1910 | 484 | 483 | +0.2% | 2.53 | 191.3 |
| Spring Lake (Note: Spring Lake was formerly known as Edmonton Beach prior to January 1, 1999.) | Parkland County | January 1, 1999 | 711 | 699 | +1.7% | 2.28 | 311.8 |
| Standard | Wheatland County | April 29, 1922 | 353 | 353 | 0.0% | 2.34 | 150.9 |
| Stirling | Warner No. 5, County of | September 3, 1901 | 1,164 | 978 | +19.0% | 2.7 | 431.1 |
| Veteran | Special Area No. 4 | June 30, 1914 | 214 | 207 | +3.4% | 0.84 | 254.8 |
| Vilna | Smoky Lake County | June 23, 1923 | 268 | 290 | −7.6% | 0.96 | 279.2 |
| Warburg | Leduc County | December 31, 1953 | 676 | 766 | −11.7% | 2.56 | 264.1 |
| Warner | Warner No. 5, County of | November 12, 1908 | 364 | 373 | −2.4% | 1.16 | 313.8 |
| Waskatenau | Smoky Lake County | May 19, 1932 | 247 | 186 | +32.8% | 0.59 | 418.6 |
| Youngstown | Special Area No. 3 | December 31, 1936 | 171 | 154 | +11.0% | 1.11 | 154.1 |
| Total villages | — | — | 32,191 | 33,176 | −3.0% | 143.71 | 224.0 |

==== Summer villages ====
According to former Section 79 of the Municipal Government Act (MGA), a summer village is an area that:

- has at least 60 parcels of land developed with dwelling buildings; and
- has a population of less than 300 persons where the majority of the persons who would be electors do not permanently reside in that area.

As a result of Section 79 being repealed, summer villages can no longer be formed in Alberta.

Essentially, summer villages were once formed from urban communities with populations of less than 300 people and significant non-permanent populations. When a summer village's population exceeds 300 people, its council may apply to change its status to that of a village, but the change in incorporated status is not mandatory.

Alberta currently has a total of 51 summer villages, with a combined population totalling 5,200 as of 2019.

List of summer villages in Alberta
| Name | Rural municipality | Incorporation date (summer village) | 2021 Census of Population | | | | |
| Name | Rural municipality | Incorporation date (summer village) | Population (2021) | Population (2016) | Change | Land area (km^{2}) | Population density (/km^{2}) |
|---|---|---|---|---|---|---|---|
| Argentia Beach | Wetaskiwin No. 10, County of | January 1, 1967 | 39 | 27 | +44.4% | 0.62 | 62.9 |
| Betula Beach | Parkland County | January 1, 1960 | 27 | 16 | +68.8% | 0.23 | 117.4 |
| Birch Cove | Lac Ste. Anne County | December 31, 1988 | 67 | 45 | +48.9% | 0.29 | 231.0 |
| Birchcliff | Lacombe County | January 1, 1972 | 211 | 117 | +80.3% | 0.97 | 217.5 |
| Bondiss | Athabasca County | January 1, 1983 | 124 | 110 | +12.7% | 1.18 | 105.1 |
| Bonnyville Beach | Bonnyville No. 87, M.D. of | January 1, 1958 | 70 | 84 | −16.7% | 0.23 | 304.3 |
| Burnstick Lake | Clearwater County | December 31, 1991 | 21 | 15 | +40.0% | 0.18 | 116.7 |
| Castle Island | Lac Ste. Anne County | January 1, 1955 | 15 | 10 | +50.0% | 0.05 | 300.0 |
| Crystal Springs | Wetaskiwin No. 10, County of | January 1, 1957 | 74 | 51 | +45.1% | 0.45 | 164.4 |
| Ghost Lake | Bighorn No. 8, M.D. of | December 31, 1953 | 82 | 82 | 0.0% | 0.62 | 132.3 |
| Golden Days | Leduc County | January 1, 1965 | 248 | 160 | +55.0% | 2.13 | 116.4 |
| Grandview | Wetaskiwin No. 10, County of | January 1, 1967 | 143 | 109 | +31.2% | 0.45 | 317.8 |
| Gull Lake | Lacombe County | September 1, 1993 | 226 | 176 | +28.4% | 0.7 | 322.9 |
| Half Moon Bay | Lacombe County | January 1, 1978 | 65 | 42 | +54.8% | 0.12 | 541.7 |
| Horseshoe Bay | St. Paul No. 19, County of | January 1, 1985 | 81 | 49 | +65.3% | 0.98 | 82.7 |
| Island Lake | Athabasca County | January 1, 1958 | 174 | 228 | −23.7% | 1.55 | 112.3 |
| Island Lake South | Athabasca County | January 1, 1983 | 81 | 61 | +32.8% | 0.48 | 168.8 |
| Itaska Beach | Leduc County | June 30, 1953 | 30 | 23 | +30.4% | 0.26 | 115.4 |
| Jarvis Bay | Red Deer County | January 1, 1986 | 213 | 213 | 0.0% | 0.55 | 387.3 |
| Kapasiwin | Parkland County | September 1, 1993 | 24 | 10 | +140.0% | 0.33 | 72.7 |
| Lakeview | Parkland County | October 25, 1913 | 29 | 30 | −3.3% | 0.32 | 90.6 |
| Larkspur | Westlock County | January 1, 1985 | 53 | 44 | +20.5% | 0.26 | 203.8 |
| Ma-Me-O Beach | Wetaskiwin No. 10, County of | December 31, 1948 | 128 (Note: Originally published as 162, Ma-Me-O Beach's 2021 population was amended to 128 by Statistics Canada.) | 110 | +16.4% | 0.56 | 228.6 |
| Mewatha Beach | Athabasca County | January 1, 1978 | 103 | 90 | +14.4% | 0.79 | 130.4 |
| Nakamun Park | Lac Ste. Anne County | January 1, 1966 | 78 | 96 | −18.7% | 0.43 | 181.4 |
| Norglenwold | Red Deer County | January 1, 1965 | 306 | 273 | +12.1% | 0.62 | 493.5 |
| Norris Beach | Wetaskiwin No. 10, County of | December 31, 1988 | 71 | 38 | +86.8% | 0.19 | 373.7 |
| Parkland Beach | Ponoka County | January 1, 1984 | 168 | 153 | +9.8% | 0.94 | 178.7 |
| Pelican Narrows | Bonnyville No. 87, M.D. of | July 1, 1979 | 158 | 151 | +4.6% | 0.74 | 213.5 |
| Point Alison | Parkland County | December 31, 1950 | 18 | 10 | +80.0% | 0.19 | 94.7 |
| Poplar Bay | Wetaskiwin No. 10, County of | January 1, 1967 | 113 | 103 | +9.7% | 0.71 | 159.2 |
| Rochon Sands | Stettler No. 6, County of | May 17, 1929 | 97 | 86 | +12.8% | 2.03 | 47.8 |
| Ross Haven | Lac Ste. Anne County | January 1, 1962 | 126 | 160 | −21.3% | 0.7 | 180.0 |
| Sandy Beach | Lac Ste. Anne County | January 1, 1956 | 278 | 278 | 0.0% | 2.41 | 115.4 |
| Seba Beach | Parkland County | August 20, 1920 | 229 | 169 | +35.5% | 0.53 | 432.1 |
| Silver Beach | Wetaskiwin No. 10, County of | December 31, 1953 | 55 | 65 | −15.4% | 0.61 | 90.2 |
| Silver Sands | Lac Ste. Anne County | January 1, 1969 | 214 | 160 | +33.7% | 2.51 | 85.3 |
| South Baptiste | Athabasca County | January 1, 1983 | 70 | 66 | +6.1% | 0.91 | 76.9 |
| South View | Lac Ste. Anne County | January 1, 1970 | 72 | 67 | +7.5% | 0.44 | 163.6 |
| Sunbreaker Cove | Lacombe County | December 31, 1990 | 131 | 81 | +61.7% | 0.47 | 278.7 |
| Sundance Beach | Leduc County | January 1, 1970 | 42 | 73 | −42.5% | 0.43 | 97.7 |
| Sunrise Beach | Lac Ste. Anne County | December 31, 1988 | 153 | 135 | +13.3% | 1.66 | 92.2 |
| Sunset Beach | Athabasca County | May 1, 1977 | 55 | 49 | +12.2% | 0.87 | 63.2 |
| Sunset Point | Lac Ste. Anne County | January 1, 1959 | 257 | 169 | +52.1% | 1.17 | 219.7 |
| Val Quentin | Lac Ste. Anne County | January 1, 1966 | 158 | 252 | −37.3% | 0.29 | 544.8 |
| Waiparous | Bighorn No. 8, M.D. of | January 1, 1986 | 57 | 49 | +16.3% | 0.41 | 139.0 |
| West Baptiste | Athabasca County | January 1, 1983 | 46 | 38 | +21.1% | 0.54 | 85.2 |
| West Cove | Lac Ste. Anne County | January 1, 1963 | 222 | 149 | +49.0% | 1.3 | 170.8 |
| Whispering Hills | Athabasca County | January 1, 1983 | 128 | 142 | −9.9% | 1.64 | 78.0 |
| White Sands | Stettler No. 6, County of | January 1, 1980 | 174 | 120 | +45.0% | 1.61 | 108.1 |
| Yellowstone | Lac Ste. Anne County | January 1, 1965 | 117 | 137 | −14.6% | 0.28 | 417.9 |
| Total summer villages | — | — | 5,921 | 5,171 | +14.5% | 38.93 | 152.1 |

=== Specialized municipalities ===
According to Section 83 of the Municipal Government Act (MGA), a municipality may incorporate as a specialized municipality under one of the following three scenarios:

- where the Minister of Alberta Municipal Affairs (AMA) is satisfied that the other incorporated statuses under the MGA do not meet the needs of the municipality's residents;
- to form a local government that, in the opinion of the Minister of AMA, will provide for the orderly development of the municipality in a similar fashion to the other incorporated statuses within the MGA; or
- for any other circumstances that are deemed appropriate by the Minister of AMA.

Essentially, specialized municipalities are municipalities that are unconventional in nature compared to other municipalities in Alberta, and they are incorporated under the authority of the existing MGA instead of relying on the creation of their own separate acts (i.e., the Special Areas Act allowed the incorporation of Alberta's three special areas and the Metis Settlements Act allowed the incorporation of Alberta's eight Métis settlements).

Alberta's six specialized municipalities have a combined population totalling 242,395 as of 2019.

List of specialized municipalities in Alberta
| Name | Region | Incorporation date (specialized municipality) | Council size | 2021 Census of Population | | | | |
| Name | Region | Incorporation date (specialized municipality) | Council size | Population (2021) | Population (2016) | Change | Land area (km^{2}) | Population density (/km^{2}) |
|---|---|---|---|---|---|---|---|---|
| Crowsnest Pass, Municipality of | Southern Alberta | January 16, 2008 | 7 | 5,695 | 5,589 | +1.9% | 370.15 | 15.4 |
| Jasper, Municipality of | Alberta's Rockies | July 20, 2001 | 7 | 4,738 | 4,590 | +3.2% | 921.90 | 5.1 |
| Lac La Biche County (Note: Excludes the unpopulated land area of the portion of the Kikino Metis Settlement that is within Lac La Biche County.) | Northern Alberta | January 1, 2018 | 9 | 7,673 | 8,330 | −7.9% | 12,527.48 | 0.6 |
| Mackenzie County | Northern Alberta | June 23, 1999 | 10 | 12,804 | 11,171 | +14.6% | 79,629.26 | 0.2 |
| Strathcona County | Edmonton Metro | January 1, 1996 | 9 | 99,225 | 98,044 | +1.2% | 1,170.65 | 84.8 |
| Wood Buffalo, Regional Municipality of | Northern Alberta | April 1, 1995 | 11 | 72,326 | 71,589 | +1.0% | 60,843.88 | 1.2 |
| Total specialized municipalities | — | — | 53 | 202,461 | 199,298 | +1.6% | 155,463.32 | 1.3 |

=== Rural municipalities ===
==== Municipal districts ====
According to Section 78 of the Municipal Government Act (MGA), a municipal district is an area in which:

- the majority of the buildings used as dwellings are on parcels of land with an area of at least 1,850 m^{2} (19,900 sq ft); and
- there is a population of 1,000 or more.

Essentially, municipal districts are large rural areas in which their citizens reside on farms, country residential subdivisions or unincorporated communities (i.e., hamlets, localities and other settlements).

In Alberta, the term county is synonymous with the term municipal district – it is not its own incorporated municipal status that is different from that of a municipal district. As such, Alberta Municipal Affairs provides municipal districts with the opportunity to brand themselves either as municipal districts or counties in their official names.

Of Alberta's 63 municipal districts, 46 of them brand themselves as counties. Over the past 30 years, Alberta has observed a trend of numerous municipal districts rebranding themselves as counties through official name changes. Some of the reasons why a municipal district would rebrand itself as a county include that the term county is: more recognizable by the general public; has a more traditional appeal; and is more marketable from an economic development perspective.

The last municipal district (MD) to rebrand itself as a county was the MD of Foothills No. 31, which was renamed as Foothills County on January 1, 2019.

Alberta's 63 municipal districts have a combined population totalling 471,852 as of 2019.

List of municipal districts in Alberta
| Municipal district (MD) | Incorporation date | Census division | Council size | 2021 Census of Population | | | | |
| Municipal district (MD) | Incorporation date | Census division | Council size | Population (2021) | Population (2016) | Change | Land area (km²) | Population density (/km²) |
|---|---|---|---|---|---|---|---|---|
| MD of Acadia No. 34 | December 9, 1913 | 4 | 5 | 494 | 493 | +0.2% | 1,070.92 | 0.5 |
| Athabasca County | January 1, 1947 | 13 | 9 | 6,959 | 7,869 | −11.6% | 6,111.30 | 1.1 |
| County of Barrhead No. 11 | January 1, 1955 | 13 | 7 | 5,877 | 6,288 | −6.5% | 2,385.28 | 2.5 |
| Beaver County | February 1, 1943 | 10 | 5 | 5,868 | 5,905 | −0.6% | 3,219.74 | 1.8 |
| Big Lakes County | January 1, 1995 | 17 | 9 | 3,664 | 4,103 | −10.7% | 11,897.75 | 0.3 |
| MD of Bighorn No. 8 | January 1, 1988 | 15 | 5 | 1,598 | 1,324 | +20.7% | 2,678.80 | 0.6 |
| Birch Hills County | January 1, 1995 | 19 | 7 | 1,516 | 1,553 | −2.4% | 2,848.75 | 0.5 |
| MD of Bonnyville No. 87 | January 1, 1955 | 12 | 7 | 11,864 | 11,661 | +1.7% | 5,410.21 | 2.2 |
| Brazeau County | July 1, 1988 | 11 | 7 | 7,179 | 7,771 | −7.6% | 3,000.14 | 2.4 |
| Camrose County | January 1, 1944 | 10 | 7 | 8,504 | 8,660 | −1.8% | 3,291.75 | 2.6 |
| Cardston County | January 1, 1954 | 3 | 7 | 4,856 | 4,481 | +8.4% | 3,358.39 | 1.4 |
| Clear Hills County | January 1, 1995 | 17 | 7 | 3,006 | 3,018 | −0.4% | 15,025.54 | 0.2 |
| Clearwater County | January 1, 1985 | 9 | 7 | 11,865 | 11,947 | −0.7% | 18,605.71 | 0.6 |
| Cypress County | January 1, 1985 | 1 | 9 | 7,524 | 7,662 | −1.8% | 12,977.99 | 0.6 |
| MD of Fairview No. 136 | December 9, 1914 | 19 | 5 | 1,580 | 1,604 | −1.5% | 1,373.66 | 1.2 |
| Flagstaff County | January 1, 1944 | 7 | 7 | 3,694 | 3,728 | −0.9% | 3,959.78 | 0.9 |
| Foothills County | January 1, 1954 | 6 | 7 | 23,199 | 22,616 | +2.6% | 3,604.76 | 6.4 |
| County of Forty Mile No. 8 | January 1, 1954 | 1 | 7 | 3,471 | 3,581 | −3.1% | 7,163.61 | 0.5 |
| County of Grande Prairie No. 1 | December 21, 1943 | 19 | 9 | 23,769 | 22,502 | +5.6% | 5,790.59 | 4.1 |
| MD of Greenview No. 16 | January 1, 1994 | 18 | 8 | 8,584 | 9,154 | −6.2% | 32,925.53 | 0.3 |
| Kneehill County | January 1, 1944 | 5 | 7 | 4,992 | 5,001 | −0.2% | 3,373.40 | 1.5 |
| Lac Ste. Anne County | January 1, 1944 | 13 | 7 | 10,832 | 10,899 | −0.6% | 2,845.84 | 3.8 |
| Lacombe County | January 1, 1944 | 8 | 7 | 10,283 | 10,343 | −0.6% | 2,759.12 | 3.7 |
| Lamont County | January 1, 1944 | 10 | 5 | 3,754 | 3,884 | −3.3% | 2,385.58 | 1.6 |
| Leduc County | January 1, 1944 | 11 | 7 | 14,416 | 13,177 | +9.4% | 2,502.59 | 5.8 |
| MD of Lesser Slave River No. 124 | January 1, 1995 | 17 | 7 | 2,861 | 2,803 | +2.1% | 10,041.79 | 0.3 |
| Lethbridge County | January 1, 1954 | 2 | 7 | 10,120 | 10,237 | −1.1% | 2,815.66 | 3.6 |
| County of Minburn No. 27 | January 30, 1942 | 10 | 7 | 3,014 | 3,188 | −5.5% | 2,850.37 | 1.1 |
| Mountain View County | January 1, 1944 | 6 | 7 | 12,981 | 13,074 | −0.7% | 3,763.42 | 3.4 |
| County of Newell | January 1, 1953 | 2 | 10 | 7,465 | 7,524 | −0.8% | 5,810.15 | 1.3 |
| County of Northern Lights | January 1, 1995 | 17 | 7 | 3,601 | 3,656 | −1.5% | 18,900.57 | 0.2 |
| Northern Sunrise County | April 1, 1994 | 17 | 6 | 1,711 | 1,921 | −10.9% | 20,914.35 | 0.1 |
| MD of Opportunity No. 17 | August 1, 1995 | 17 | 11 | 3,382 | 3,253 | +4.0% | 28,857.88 | 0.1 |
| County of Paintearth No. 18 | January 1, 1944 | 7 | 7 | 1,990 | 2,102 | −5.3% | 3,239.58 | 0.6 |
| Parkland County | January 1, 1969 | 11 | 7 | 32,205 | 32,737 | −1.6% | 2,375.67 | 13.6 |
| MD of Peace No. 135 | December 11, 1916 | 19 | 5 | 1,581 | 1,752 | −9.8% | 847.22 | 1.9 |
| MD of Pincher Creek No. 9 | January 1, 1944 | 3 | 5 | 3,240 | 2,965 | +9.3% | 3,455.75 | 0.9 |
| Ponoka County | January 1, 1952 | 8 | 5 | 9,998 | 9,806 | +2.0% | 2,807.99 | 3.6 |
| MD of Provost No. 52 | March 1, 1943 | 7 | 7 | 2,071 | 2,205 | −6.1% | 3,571.12 | 0.6 |
| MD of Ranchland No. 66 | January 1, 1995 | 15 | 3 | 110 | 92 | +19.6% | 2,636.75 | 0.0 |
| Red Deer County | January 1, 1944 | 8 | 7 | 19,933 | 19,531 | +2.1% | 3,919.25 | 5.1 |
| Rocky View County | January 1, 1955 | 6 | 9 | 41,028 | 39,407 | +4.1% | 3,828.85 | 10.7 |
| Saddle Hills County | January 1, 1995 | 19 | 7 | 2,338 | 2,225 | +5.1% | 5,827.70 | 0.4 |
| Smoky Lake County | March 1, 1943 | 12 | 5 | 2,517 | 2,461 | +2.3% | 2,619.69 | 1.0 |
| MD of Smoky River No. 130 | January 1, 1952 | 19 | 6 | 1,684 | 2,006 | −16.1% | 2,834.18 | 0.6 |
| MD of Spirit River No. 133 | December 11, 1916 | 19 | 4 | 649 | 700 | −7.3% | 679.86 | 1.0 |
| County of St. Paul No. 19 | January 30, 1942 | 12 | 7 | 6,306 | 6,036 | +4.5% | 3,280.40 | 1.9 |
| Starland County | February 1, 1943 | 5 | 5 | 1,821 | 2,066 | −11.9% | 2,540.85 | 0.7 |
| County of Stettler No. 6 | March 1, 1943 | 7 | 7 | 5,666 | 5,566 | +1.8% | 3,969.65 | 1.4 |
| Sturgeon County | January 1, 1955 | 11 | 7 | 20,061 | 20,495 | −2.1% | 2,084.24 | 9.6 |
| MD of Taber | January 1, 1954 | 2 | 7 | 7,447 | 7,098 | +4.9% | 4,160.47 | 1.8 |
| Thorhild County | January 1, 1955 | 13 | 5 | 3,042 | 3,254 | −6.5% | 1,997.17 | 1.5 |
| County of Two Hills No. 21 | January 1, 1944 | 10 | 5 | 3,412 | 3,641 | −6.3% | 2,600.15 | 1.3 |
| County of Vermilion River | January 1, 1944 | 10 | 7 | 7,994 | 8,453 | −5.4% | 5,420.13 | 1.5 |
| Vulcan County | January 1, 1951 | 5 | 7 | 4,237 | 3,984 | +6.4% | 5,356.65 | 0.8 |
| MD of Wainwright No. 61 | January 30, 1942 | 7 | 7 | 4,276 | 4,464 | −4.2% | 4,095.29 | 1.0 |
| County of Warner No. 5 | January 1, 1954 | 2 | 7 | 4,290 | 3,942 | +8.8% | 4,462.20 | 1.0 |
| Westlock County | February 1, 1943 | 13 | 7 | 7,186 | 7,220 | −0.5% | 3,169.66 | 2.3 |
| County of Wetaskiwin No. 10 | February 1, 1943 | 11 | 7 | 11,212 | 11,176 | +0.3% | 3,121.98 | 3.6 |
| Wheatland County | January 1, 1955 | 5 | 7 | 8,738 | 8,788 | −0.6% | 4,505.05 | 1.9 |
| MD of Willow Creek No. 26 | January 1, 1954 | 3 | 7 | 6,081 | 5,575 | +9.1% | 4,485.05 | 1.4 |
| Woodlands County | January 1, 1994 | 13 | 7 | 4,558 | 4,744 | −3.9% | 7,599.52 | 0.6 |
| Yellowhead County | January 1, 1994 | 14 | 9 | 10,426 | 10,995 | −5.2% | 22,238.56 | 0.5 |
| Total municipal districts | — | — | 437 | 470,580 | 470,366 | 0.0% | 378,251.55 | 1.2 |

==== Improvement districts ====
According to Section 581 of the Municipal Government Act (MGA), Alberta's Lieutenant Governor in Council, on the recommendation of the Minister of Municipal Affairs, may form an improvement district. Section 582 of the MGA requires that the order to form an improvement district must describe its boundaries and give it an official name.

Alberta currently has seven improvement districts, which have a combined population totaling 2,146. With some exceptions, their boundaries are coterminous with that of a national or provincial park. Five of them are located within national parks, and two are within provincial parks.

List of improvement districts in Alberta
| Name | Incorporation date (improvement district) | 2021 Census of Population | | | | | Remarks |
| Name | Incorporation date (improvement district) | Population (2021) | Population (2016) | Change | Land area (km^{2}) | Population density (/km^{2}) | Remarks |
|---|---|---|---|---|---|---|---|
| Improvement District No. 4 (Waterton) | January 1, 1944 | 158 | 105 | +50.5% | 482.54 | 0.3 | Coincident with Waterton Lakes National Park |
| Improvement District No. 9 (Banff) | April 1, 1945 | 1,004 | 1,028 | −2.3% | 6,751.09 | 0.1 | Coincident with Banff National Park excluding the Town of Banff |
| Improvement District No. 12 (Jasper National Park) | April 1, 1945 | 0 | 53 | −100.0% | 10,118.55 | 0.0 | Coincident with Jasper National Park excluding the Municipality of Jasper |
| Improvement District No. 13 (Elk Island) | April 1, 1958 | 0 | 0 | NA | 165.00 | 0.0 | Coincident with Elk Island National Park |
| Improvement District No. 24 (Wood Buffalo) | January 1, 1967 | 706 | 648 | +9.0% | 33,053.78 | 0.0 | Coincident with the Alberta portion of Wood Buffalo National Park excluding Peace Point 222 |
| Improvement District No. 25 (Willmore Wilderness) | January 2, 1994 | 0 | 0 | NA | 4,601.52 | 0.0 | Coincident with Willmore Wilderness Park |
| Kananaskis Improvement District | January 1, 1983 | 156 | 221 | −29.4% | 4,203.24 | 0.0 | Consists mostly of Kananaskis Country |
| Total improvement districts | — | 2,024 | 2,055 | −1.5% | 59,375.72 | 0.0 | — |

==== Special areas ====
Special areas are rural municipalities created in 1938 under the authority of the Special Areas Act. A special area is not to be confused with a specialized municipality, which is a completely different municipal status.

Alberta's three special areas had a combined population totalling 4,184 in 2016.

List of special areas in Alberta
| Special area | Incorporation date (special area) | 2021 Census of Population | | | | |
| Special area | Incorporation date (special area) | Population (2021) | Population (2016) | Change | Area (km^{2}) | Population density (/km^{2}) |
|---|---|---|---|---|---|---|
| Special Area No. 2 | April 7, 1959 | 1,860 | 1,905 | −2.4% | 9,195.06 | 0.2 |
| Special Area No. 3 | April 7, 1959 | 1,142 | 1,153 | −1.0% | 6,469.33 | 0.2 |
| Special Area No. 4 | January 1, 1969 | 1,236 | 1,237 | −0.1% | 4,299.8 | 0.3 |
| Total special areas | — | 4,238 | 4,295 | −1.3% | 19,964.19 | 0.2 |

== Unincorporated communities ==
=== Urban service areas ===
An urban service area is a type of hamlet that is not officially defined under the Municipal Government Act (MGA). However, the province of Alberta recognizes it as equivalent to a city for the purposes of program delivery and grant eligibility according to the Orders in Council that established the Regional Municipality (RM) of Wood Buffalo and Strathcona County as specialized municipalities.

These Orders in Council (see Schedule 1, Section 7 and Schedule 1, Section 3 respectively) also state that:

- the specialized municipalities shall provide to the province of Alberta any information required to administer programs or to determine the amount of grants which would have been paid if the urban service areas were incorporated cities; and
- for the purposes of enactments affecting roads, culverts, ditches, drains, and highways, the urban service areas are deemed to be cities.

Essentially, urban services areas meet the eligibility requirements of the MGA to incorporate as a city. As such, they are Alberta's largest hamlets.

There are currently three urban services areas in Alberta: Fort McMurray, Sherwood Park, and Lac La Biche.

Fort McMurray, within the jurisdiction of the RM of Wood Buffalo, was formerly a city prior its amalgamation with Improvement District No. 143 on April 1, 1995. It was designated an urban service area at the time of the amalgamation.

Sherwood Park has always been an unincorporated community under the jurisdiction of Strathcona County. It became an urban service area when Strathcona County changed its status from a municipal district to a specialized municipality on January 1, 1996.

=== Hamlets ===
According to Section 59 of the Municipal Government Act (MGA), hamlets are unincorporated communities that:

- consist of five or more buildings used as dwellings, a majority of which are on parcels of land smaller than 1,850 m^{2} (19,900 sq ft);
- have a generally accepted boundary and name; and
- contain parcels of land that are used for non‑residential purposes.

Further, Section 59 of the MGA provides the councils of municipal districts (or counties) and specialized municipalities the authority to designate unincorporated communities within its boundaries as hamlets. Hamlets may also be designated within improvement districts and special areas by the Minister of Municipal Affairs pursuant to Section 590 of the MGA and Section 10 of the Special Areas Act respectively.

When a hamlet's population reaches 300, it becomes eligible to incorporated as a village under Section 80 of the MGA, so long as the majority of the buildings are still on parcels of land smaller than 1,850 m^{2} (19,900 sq ft). However, it is a modern-day rarity for a hamlet to incorporate as a village – Barnwell and Wabamun were the last two to do so both on January 1, 1980. It is much more common these days for villages to revert to hamlet status through the dissolution process instead.

There are currently 403 hamlets in Alberta, three of which are the urban services areas presented above.

List of hamlets in Alberta
| Name | Specialized or rural municipality | Latest population | Census year |
|---|---|---|---|
| Abee | Thorhild County | 27 | 2009 |
| Acadia Valley | Acadia No. 34, MD of | 143 | 2021 |
| Aetna | Cardston County | 109 | 2021 |
| Alcomdale | Sturgeon County | 65 | 2021 |
| Alder Flats | Wetaskiwin No. 10, County of | 137 | 2021 |
| Aldersyde | Foothills County | 64 | 2003 |
| Alhambra | Clearwater County | 64 | 1991 |
| Altario | Special Area No. 4 | 26 | 1991 |
| Antler Lake | Strathcona County | 439 | 2024 |
| Anzac | Wood Buffalo, RM of | 506 | 2021 |
| Ardenode | Wheatland County | 0 | 2016 |
| Ardley | Red Deer County | 17 | 1991 |
| Ardmore | Bonnyville No. 87, MD of | 317 | 2021 |
| Ardrossan | Strathcona County | 1,238 | 2024 |
| Armena | Camrose County | 37 | 2021 |
| Ashmont | St. Paul No. 19, County of | 125 | 2021 |
| Atmore | Athabasca County | 10 | 2021 |
| Balzac | Rocky View County | 1 | 2006 |
| Beauvallon | Two Hills No. 21, County of | 7 | 1991 |
| Beaver Crossing | Bonnyville No. 87, MD of | 18 | 1991 |
| Beaver Lake | Lac La Biche County | 467 | 2021 |
| Beaver Mines | Pincher Creek No. 9, MD of | 85 | 2021 |
| Beaverdam | Bonnyville No. 87, MD of | 18 | 2014 |
| Beazer | Cardston County | 11 | 2008 |
| Bellis (Note: Bellis dissolved from village status on December 31, 1945.) | Smoky Lake County | 60 | 2021 |
| Benalto | Red Deer County | 198 | 2021 |
| Benchlands | Bighorn No. 8, MD of | 59 | 2021 |
| Benton | Special Area No. 3 | | |
| Bezanson | Grande Prairie No. 1, County of | 146 | 2024 |
| Bindloss | Special Area No. 2 | 14 | 1991 |
| Bircham | Kneehill County | 5 | 2021 |
| Blackfoot | Vermilion River, County of | 386 | 2021 |
| Blackie (Note: Blackie dissolved from village status on August 31, 1997.) | Foothills County | 360 | 2021 |
| Blue Ridge | Woodlands County | 211 | 2021 |
| Bluesky | Fairview No. 136, MD of | 113 | 2021 |
| Bluffton | Ponoka County | 140 | 2021 |
| Bodo | Provost No. 52, MD of | 30 | 2021 |
| Botha | Stettler No. 6, County of | 180 | 2021 |
| Bottrel | Rocky View County | 5 | 2018 |
| Bow City | Newell, County of | 16 | 2020 |
| Bragg Creek | Rocky View County | 432 | 2021 |
| Brant | Vulcan County | 78 | 2007 |
| Breynat | Athabasca County | 22 | 1991 |
| Brosseau | Two Hills No. 21, County of | 13 | 1981 |
| Brownfield | Paintearth No. 18, County of | 27 | 1991 |
| Brownvale | Peace No. 135, MD of | 114 | 2021 |
| Bruce | Beaver County | 65 | 2021 |
| Brule | Yellowhead County | 127 | 2021 |
| Buck Creek | Brazeau County | 107 | 2005 |
| Buck Lake | Wetaskiwin No. 10, County of | 60 | 2021 |
| Buffalo | Special Area No. 2 | | |
| Buffalo Lakes | Grande Prairie No. 1, County of | 5 | 2024 |
| Buford | Leduc County | 33 | 2021 |
| Burdett (Note: Burdett dissolved from village status on January 1, 2003.) | Forty Mile No. 8, County of | 331 | 2021 |
| Busby | Westlock County | 135 | 2021 |
| Byemoor | Stettler No. 6, County of | 30 | 2021 |
| Cadogan (Note: Cadogan dissolved from village status on December 31, 1945.) | Provost No. 52, MD of | 108 | 2021 |
| Cadomin | Yellowhead County | 54 | 2021 |
| Cadotte Lake | Northern Sunrise County | 23 | 2021 |
| Calahoo | Sturgeon County | 143 | 2021 |
| Calling Lake | Opportunity No. 17, MD of | 375 | 2021 |
| Campsie | Barrhead No. 11, County of | | |
| Canyon Creek | Lesser Slave River No. 124, MD of | 318 | 2021 |
| Carbondale | Sturgeon County | 78 | 2021 |
| Cardiff | Sturgeon County | 1,033 | 2021 |
| Caroline | Clearwater County | 470 | 2021 |
| Carolside | Special Area No. 2 | | |
| Carseland | Wheatland County | 542 | 2021 |
| Carvel | Parkland County | 19 | 2009 |
| Carway | Cardston County | 2 | 2008 |
| Caslan | Athabasca County | 23 | 1991 |
| Cassils | Newell, County of | 22 | 2020 |
| Cavendish | Special Area No. 2 | 26 | 1986 |
| Cayley (Note: Cayley dissolved from village status on June 1, 1996.) | Foothills County | 414 | 2021 |
| Cereal | Special Area No. 3 | 111 | 2021 |
| Cessford | Special Area No. 2 | 31 | 1991 |
| Chancellor | Wheatland County | 5 | 2021 |
| Cheadle | Wheatland County | 83 | 2021 |
| Cherhill | Lac Ste. Anne County | 60 | 2008 |
| Cherry Grove | Bonnyville No. 87, MD of | 405 | 2014 |
| Chin | Lethbridge County | 83 | 2021 |
| Chinook (Note: Chinook dissolved from village status on April 1, 1977.) | Special Area No. 3 | 38 | 1991 |
| Chisholm | Lesser Slave River No. 124, MD of | 15 | 2021 |
| Clairmont (Note: Clairmont dissolved from village status on December 31, 1945.) | Grande Prairie No. 1, County of | 6,123 | 2024 |
| Clandonald | Vermilion River, County of | 117 | 2021 |
| Cleardale | Clear Hills County | 19 | 2008 |
| Cluny (Note: Cluny dissolved from village status on September 15, 1995.) | Wheatland County | 50 | 2021 |
| Cochrane Lake | Rocky View County | 767 | 2021 |
| Colinton | Athabasca County | 169 | 2021 |
| Collingwood Cove | Strathcona County | 371 | 2024 |
| Compeer (Note: Compeer dissolved from village status on December 31, 1936.) | Special Area No. 4 | 21 | 1991 |
| Condor | Clearwater County | 99 | 1991 |
| Conklin | Wood Buffalo, RM of | 154 | 2021 |
| Conrich | Rocky View County | 15 | 2021 |
| Craigmyle (Note: Craigmyle dissolved from village status on January 1, 1972.) | Starland County | 79 | 2013 |
| Cynthia (Note: Cynthia dissolved from town status on May 1, 1959.) | Brazeau County | 50 | 2005 |
| Dalemead | Rocky View County | 25 | 2021 |
| Dalroy | Rocky View County | 39 | 2021 |
| Dalum | Wheatland County | | |
| Dapp | Westlock County | 30 | 2021 |
| Darwell | Lac Ste. Anne County | 30 | 1981 |
| De Winton | Foothills County | 98 | 2003 |
| Dead Man's Flats | Bighorn No. 8, MD of | 377 | 2021 |
| Deadwood | Northern Lights, County of | 22 | 1991 |
| DeBolt | Greenview No. 16, MD of | 132 | 2021 |
| Del Bonita | Cardston County | 6 | 2008 |
| Delacour | Rocky View County | 5 | 2021 |
| Demmitt | Grande Prairie No. 1, County of | 0 | 2024 |
| Derwent (Note: Derwent dissolved from village status on September 1, 2010.) | Two Hills No. 21, County of | 96 | 2021 |
| Desert Blume | Cypress County | 835 | 2021 |
| Dewberry | Vermilion River, County of | 161 | 2021 |
| Diamond City (Note: Diamond City dissolved from village status on June 30, 1937.) | Lethbridge County | 204 | 2021 |
| Dickson | Red Deer County | 50 | 2021 |
| Dimsdale | Grande Prairie No. 1, County of | 29 | 2024 |
| Dixonville | Northern Lights, County of | 96 | 2021 |
| Donatville | Athabasca County | 0 | 2016 |
| Dorothy | Special Area No. 2 | 14 | 1991 |
| Duffield | Parkland County | 60 | 2021 |
| Duhamel | Camrose County | 46 | 2021 |
| Dunmore (Note: Dunmore dissolved from village status on February 4, 1919.) | Cypress County | 1,088 | 2021 |
| Duvernay | Two Hills No. 21, County of | 26 | 1991 |
| Eaglesham (Note: Eaglesham dissolved from village status on December 31, 1996.) | Birch Hills County | 76 | 2021 |
| Edwand | Smoky Lake County | 2 | 1986 |
| Egremont | Thorhild County | 46 | 2021 |
| Ellscott | Athabasca County | 5 | 2021 |
| Elmworth | Grande Prairie No. 1, County of | 5 | 2024 |
| Enchant (Note: Enchant dissolved from village status on January 30, 1945.) | Taber, MD of | 259 | 2016 |
| Endiang | Stettler No. 6, County of | 15 | 2021 |
| Enilda | Big Lakes County | 145 | 2021 |
| Ensign | Vulcan County | 26 | 2007 |
| Entwistle (Note: Entwistle dissolved from village status on December 31, 2000.) | Parkland County | 429 | 2021 |
| Erskine (Note: Erskine dissolved from village status on May 20, 1946.) | Stettler No. 6, County of | 319 | 2021 |
| Esther | Special Area No. 3 | | |
| Etzikom | Forty Mile No. 8, County of | 54 | 1991 |
| Evansburg (Note: Evansburg dissolved from village status on June 30, 1998.) | Yellowhead County | 717 | 2021 |
| Excel | Special Area No. 3 | | |
| Exshaw | Bighorn No. 8, MD of | 449 | 2021 |
| Fabyan | Wainwright No. 61, MD of | 100 | 2007 |
| Fairview | Lethbridge County | 165 | 2021 |
| Fallis | Parkland County | 54 | 2009 |
| Falun | Wetaskiwin No. 10, County of | 25 | 1991 |
| Faust | Big Lakes County | 282 | 2021 |
| Fawcett | Westlock County | 60 | 2021 |
| Federal | Paintearth No. 18, County of | 19 | 1991 |
| Ferintosh (Note: Ferintosh dissolved from village status on January 1, 2020.) | Camrose County | 180 | 2021 |
| Flatbush | Lesser Slave River No. 124, MD of | 30 | 2021 |
| Fleet | Paintearth No. 18, County of | 28 | 1991 |
| Fort Assiniboine (Note: For Assiniboine dissolved from village status on December 31, 1991.) | Woodlands County | 158 | 2021 |
| Fort Chipewyan | Wood Buffalo, RM of | 798 | 2021 |
| Fort Fitzgerald | Wood Buffalo, RM of | 6 | 2021 |
| Fort Kent | Bonnyville No. 87, MD of | 254 | 2021 |
| Fort McKay | Wood Buffalo, RM of | 57 (Note: Fort McKay's population does not include portion of community on Indian reserve.) | 2021 |
| Fort McMurray (Note: Fort McMurray is one of two hamlets designated an urban service area.) | Wood Buffalo, RM of | 68,002 (Note: Fort McMurray's population is that of its population centre as delineated by Statistics Canada.) | 2021 |
| Fort Vermilion | Mackenzie County | 772 | 2024 |
| Gadsby | Stettler No. 6, County of | 36 | 2021 |
| Gainford | Parkland County | 118 | 2021 |
| Galahad (Note: Galahad dissolved from village status on January 1, 2016.) | Flagstaff County | 125 | 2021 |
| Gasoline Alley | Red Deer County | | |
| Gem | Newell, County of | 29 | 2020 |
| Gleichen (Note: Gleichen dissolved from town status on March 31, 1998.) | Wheatland County | 314 | 2021 |
| Glenevis | Lac Ste. Anne County | 49 | 2008 |
| Goodfare | Grande Prairie No. 1, County of | 15 | 2024 |
| Goose Lake (Note: Goose Lake is also known as Lone Pine.) | Woodlands County | 11 | unpublished |
| Grande Cache (Note: Grande Cache dissolved from town status on January 1, 2019.) | Greenview No. 16, MD of | 3,276 | 2021 |
| Granum | Willow Creek No. 26, MD of | 557 | 2021 |
| Grassland | Athabasca County | 46 | 2021 |
| Grassy Lake (Note: Grassy Lake dissolved from village status on July 1, 1996.) | Taber, MD of | 856 | 2021 |
| Green Court | Lac Ste. Anne County | 51 | 2008 |
| Greenshields | Wainwright No. 61, MD of | 80 | 2007 |
| Gregoire Lake Estates | Wood Buffalo, RM of | 138 | 2021 |
| Grouard (Note: Grouard, also known as Grouard Mission, dissolved from village status on January 18, 1944.) | Big Lakes County | 166 | 2021 |
| Grovedale | Greenview No. 16, MD of | 138 | unpublished |
| Gunn | Lac Ste. Anne County | 26 | 2021 |
| Guy | Smoky River No. 130, MD of | 57 | 1991 |
| Gwynne | Wetaskiwin No. 10, County of | 93 | 2021 |
| Hairy Hill (Note: Hairy Hill dissolved from village status on December 31, 1996.) | Two Hills No. 21, County of | 30 (Note: Hairy Hill's population is from the 2001 federal census (Statistics Canada did not publish its population in the 2006, 2011 or 2016 federal censuses).) | 2001 |
| Halcourt | Grande Prairie No. 1, County of | 5 | 2024 |
| Half Moon Lake (Note: Half Moon Lake is also known as Half Moon Estates.) | Strathcona County | 206 | 2024 |
| Halkirk | Paintearth No. 18, County of | 92 | 2021 |
| Harmony | Rocky View County | 757 | 2021 |
| Hartell | Foothills County | 13 | 1991 |
| Harvie Heights | Bighorn No. 8, MD of | 163 | 2021 |
| Hastings Lake | Strathcona County | 110 | 2024 |
| Haynes | Lacombe County | 15 | 2021 |
| Hays | Taber, MD of | 196 | 2021 |
| Hayter | Provost No. 52, MD of | 84 | 2021 |
| Heinsburg | St. Paul No. 19, County of | 60 | 1991 |
| Hemaruka | Special Area No. 4 | | |
| Heritage Pointe | Foothills County | 1,974 (Note: Heritage Pointe's population is that of its population centre as delineated by Statistics Canada.) | 2021 |
| Herronton | Vulcan County | 10 | 2007 |
| Hesketh | Kneehill County | 10 | 2021 |
| Hilda | Cypress County | 40 | 2021 |
| Hilliard | Lamont County | 35 | 1991 |
| Hoadley | Ponoka County | 9 | 1991 |
| Huallen | Grande Prairie No. 1, County of | 10 | 2024 |
| Huxley | Kneehill County | 75 | 2021 |
| Hylo | Lac La Biche County | 33 | 2016 |
| Hythe | Grande Prairie No. 1, County of | 835 | 2024 |
| Iddesleigh | Special Area No. 2 | 14 | 1991 |
| Indus | Rocky View County | 36 | 2021 |
| Iron River | Bonnyville No. 87, MD of | | |
| Iron Springs | Lethbridge County | 84 | 2021 |
| Irvine (Note: Irvine dissolved from town status on December 31, 1996.) | Cypress County | 321 | 2021 |
| Islay (Note: Islay dissolved from village status on March 2, 1944.) | Vermilion River, County of | 177 | 2021 |
| Janet | Rocky View County | 1 | 2006 |
| Janvier South (Note: Janvier South is also known as Janvier and Chard.) | Wood Buffalo, RM of | 61 | 2021 |
| Jarvie | Westlock County | 103 | 2021 |
| Jean Cote | Smoky River No. 130, MD of | 65 | 1991 |
| Jenner (Note: Jenner dissolved from village status on June 22, 1943.) | Special Area No. 2 | 35 | 1986 |
| Joffre | Lacombe County | 128 | 2021 |
| Johnson's Addition | Taber, MD of | 126 | 2021 |
| Josephburg | Strathcona County | 122 | 2024 |
| Joussard | Big Lakes County | 334 | 2021 |
| Kathyrn | Rocky View County | 21 | 2021 |
| Kavanagh | Leduc County | 39 | 2021 |
| Keephills | Parkland County | 57 | 2021 |
| Kelsey | Camrose County | 15 | 2021 |
| Keoma | Rocky View County | 95 | 2021 |
| Kimball | Cardston County | 26 | 2008 |
| Kingman | Camrose County | 78 | 2021 |
| Kinsella | Beaver County | 40 | 2009 |
| Kinuso (Note: Kinuso dissolved from village status on September 1, 2009.) | Big Lakes County | 150 | 2021 |
| Kipp | Lethbridge County | 12 | 1981 |
| Kirkcaldy | Vulcan County | 12 | 2007 |
| Kirriemuir | Special Area No. 4 | 28 | 1991 |
| La Corey | Bonnyville No. 87, MD of | 59 | 2014 |
| La Crete | Mackenzie County | 4,010 | 2024 |
| La Glace | Grande Prairie No. 1, County of | 174 | 2024 |
| Lac des Arcs | Bighorn No. 8, MD of | 146 | 2021 |
| Lac La Biche (Note: Lac La Biche dissolved from town status on August 1, 2007, as a result of its amalgamation with Lakeland County to form Lac La Biche County.) | Lac La Biche County | 3,215 | 2021 |
| Lafond | St. Paul No. 19, County of | 35 | 1991 |
| Lake Newell Resort | Newell, County of | 457 | 2021 |
| Lamoureux | Sturgeon County | 60 | 2008 |
| Landry Heights | Greenview No. 16, MD of | 114 | 1991 |
| Lanfine | Special Area No. 3 | | |
| Langdon (Note: Langdon dissolved from village status on December 31, 1945.) | Rocky View County | 5,497 | 2021 |
| Lavoy (Note: Lavoy dissolved from village status on April 30, 1999.) | Minburn No. 27, County of | 108 | 2001 |
| Leavitt | Cardston County | 59 | 2008 |
| Leedale | Ponoka County | 11 | 1991 |
| Leslieville | Clearwater County | 134 | 2021 |
| Lindbergh | St. Paul No. 19, County of | 50 | 1991 |
| Linn Valley | Red Deer County | 218 | 2021 |
| Little Buffalo | Northern Sunrise County | 441 | 2021 |
| Little Smoky | Greenview No. 16, MD of | 28 | 1991 |
| Lodgepole (Note: Lodgepole dissolved from new town status on March 1, 1970.) | Brazeau County | 117 | 2021 |
| Long Lake | Thorhild County | 81 | 2021 |
| Looma | Leduc County | 33 | 2021 |
| Lottie Lake | St. Paul No. 19, County of | 94 (Note: Referred to as Lottie Lake Development by Statistics Canada in the 1991 census.) | 1991 |
| Lousana | Red Deer County | 42 | 2021 |
| Lowland Heights | Pincher Creek No. 9, MD of | 43 | 2021 |
| Loyalist | Special Area No. 4 | 8 | 1986 |
| Lundbreck | Pincher Creek No. 9, MD of | 289 | 2021 |
| Lyalta | Wheatland County | 480 | 2021 |
| Lymburn | Grande Prairie No. 1, County of | 5 | 2024 |
| |Madden | Rocky View County | 10 | 2021 |
| Mallaig | St. Paul No. 19, County of | 210 | 2021 |
| Manola | Barrhead No. 11, County of | 29 | 1991 |
| Manyberries | Forty Mile No. 8, County of | 96 | 1991 |
| Marie Reine | Northern Sunrise County | 67 | 2010 |
| Markerville | Red Deer County | 38 | 2021 |
| Marlboro | Yellowhead County | 97 | 2021 |
| Marten Beach | Lesser Slave River No. 124, MD of | 38 | 1991 |
| Maskwacis (formerly Hobbema) | Ponoka County | 64 | 2021 |
| McLaughlin | Vermilion River, County of | 41 | 2015 |
| Meanook | Athabasca County | 35 | 2021 |
| Mearns | Sturgeon County | 10 | 2008 |
| Meeting Creek | Camrose County | 0 | 2021 |
| Metiskow | Provost No. 52, MD of | 65 (Note: Statistics Canada cautioned that Metiskow's population from the 1991 census may be an estimate.) | 1991 |
| Michichi | Starland County | 34 | 2013 |
| Millarville | Foothills County | 58 | 2003 |
| Minburn (Note: Minburn dissolved from village status on July 1, 2015.) | Minburn No. 27, County of | 78 | 2021 |
| Mirror (Note: Mirror dissolved from village status on January 1, 2004.) | Lacombe County | 481 | 2021 |
| Mitsue Lake Industrial | Lesser Slave River No. 124, MD of | | |
| Monarch (Note: Monarch dissolved from village status on December 31, 1938.) | Lethbridge County | 217 | 2021 |
| Monitor (Note: Monitor dissolved from village status on December 31, 1945.) | Special Area No. 4 | 60 | 1991 |
| Moon River Estates | Willow Creek No. 26, MD of | 145 | 2021 |
| Morecambe | Two Hills No. 21, County of | 23 | 1981 |
| Morningside | Lacombe County | 85 | 2021 |
| Mossleigh | Vulcan County | 53 | 2007 |
| Mountain View (Note: Mountain View dissolved from village status on September 9, 1915.) | Cardston County | 87 | 2021 |
| Mulhurst Bay (Note: Mulhurst Bay is also known as Mulhurst.) | Wetaskiwin No. 10, County of | 447 | 2021 |
| Musidora | Two Hills No. 21, County of | 13 | 1991 |
| Namaka | Wheatland County | 72 | 2021 |
| Namao | Sturgeon County | 10 | 2010 |
| Naphtha | Foothills County | 27 | 1991 |
| Neerlandia | Barrhead No. 11, County of | 101 | 1991 |
| Nestow | Westlock County | 5 | 2021 |
| Nevis | Stettler No. 6, County of | 30 | 2021 |
| New Brigden | Special Area No. 3 | 24 | 1991 |
| New Dayton | Warner No. 5, County of | 47 | 1991 |
| New Norway (Note: New Norway dissolved from village status on November 1, 2012.) | Camrose County | 307 | 2021 |
| New Sarepta (Note: New Sarepta dissolved from village status on September 1, 2010.) | Leduc County | 495 | 2021 |
| Newbrook | Thorhild County | 63 | 2021 |
| Nightingale | Wheatland County | 37 | 2021 |
| Nisku | Leduc County | 30 | 2005 |
| Niton Junction | Yellowhead County | 88 | 2021 |
| Nordegg | Clearwater County | 53 | 1986 |
| North Cooking Lake | Strathcona County | 53 | 2024 |
| North Star | Northern Lights, County of | 49 | 1991 |
| Notikewin | Northern Lights, County of | 17 | 1991 |
| Ohaton (Note: Ohaton dissolved from village status on December 31, 1945.) | Camrose County | 133 | 2021 |
| Opal | Thorhild County | 24 | 2009 |
| Orion | Forty Mile No. 8, County of | 11 | 1991 |
| Orton | Willow Creek No. 26, MD of | 180 | 2021 |
| Parkland | Willow Creek No. 26, MD of | 50 | 1991 |
| Patricia | Newell, County of | 78 | 2021 |
| Peers | Yellowhead County | 91 | 2021 |
| Pelican Point | Camrose County | 117 | 2021 |
| Peoria | Birch Hills County | 12 | 1986 |
| Perryvale | Athabasca County | 10 | 2021 |
| Pibroch | Westlock County | 35 | 2021 |
| Pickardville | Westlock County | 303 | 2021 |
| Pincher Station | Pincher Creek No. 9, MD of | 26 | 2021 |
| Pine Sands | Sturgeon County | 30 | 2008 |
| Plamondon (Note: Plamondon dissolved from village status on May 1, 2002.) | Lac La Biche County | 501 | 2021 |
| Pollockville | Special Area No. 2 | 19 | 1981 |
| Poplar Ridge | Brazeau County | 604 | 2005 |
| Priddis | Foothills County | 79 | 2003 |
| Priddis Greens | Foothills County | 267 | 2003 |
| Purple Springs | Taber, MD of | 101 | 2021 |
| Queenstown | Vulcan County | 8 | 2007 |
| Radway (Note: Radway dissolved from village status on December 31, 1996.) | Thorhild County | 231 | 2021 |
| Rainier | Newell, County of | 22 | 2020 |
| Ranfurly (Note: Ranfurly dissolved from village status on December 31, 1945.) | Minburn No. 27, County of | 71 | 2021 |
| Red Earth Creek | Opportunity No. 17, MD of | 315 | 2021 |
| Red Willow | Stettler No. 6, County of | 63 | 2021 |
| Redland | Wheatland County | 20 | 2021 |
| Reno | Northern Sunrise County | 20 | 2021 |
| Rich Valley | Lac Ste. Anne County | 32 | 2008 |
| Richdale (Note: Richdale dissolved from village status on June 2, 1931.) | Special Area No. 2 | 14 | 1991 |
| Ridgevalley | Greenview No. 16, MD of | 46 | 1991 |
| Rivercourse | Vermilion River, County of | 16 | 2015 |
| Riverview | St. Paul No. 19, County of | 49 | 1991 |
| Rivière Qui Barre | Sturgeon County | 91 | 2021 |
| Robb | Yellowhead County | 144 | 2021 |
| Rochester | Athabasca County | 72 | 2021 |
| Rochfort Bridge | Lac Ste. Anne County | 71 | 2008 |
| Rocky Rapids | Brazeau County | 317 | 2005 |
| Rolling Hills | Newell, County of | 273 | 2021 |
| Rolly View | Leduc County | 71 | 2021 |
| Rosebud (Note: Rosebud dissolved from village status on December 31, 1945.) | Wheatland County | 112 | 2021 |
| Roselynn | Special Area No. 2 | | |
| Round Hill | Camrose County | 125 | 2021 |
| Rowley | Starland County | 8 | 2013 |
| Rumsey (Note: Rumsey dissolved from village status on January 1, 1995.) | Starland County | 64 | 2013 |
| Sandy Lake (Note: Sandy Lake is also known as Pelican Mountain.) | Opportunity No. 17, MD of | 163 | 2021 |
| Sangudo (Note: Sangudo dissolved from village status on September 16, 2007.) | Lac Ste. Anne County | 298 | 2021 |
| Saprae Creek | Wood Buffalo, RM of | 658 | 2021 |
| Scandia | Newell, County of | 169 | 2021 |
| Scapa | Special Area No. 2 | | |
| Schuler | Cypress County | 86 | 2021 |
| Scotfield | Special Area No. 2 | | |
| Sedalia | Special Area No. 3 | 15 | 1991 |
| Seven Persons | Cypress County | 277 | 2021 |
| Shaughnessy | Lethbridge County | 388 | 2021 |
| Sheerness | Special Area No. 2 | 25 | 1986 |
| Sherwood Park (Note: Sherwood Park is one of two hamlets designated an urban service area.) | Strathcona County | 75,575 | 2024 |
| Shouldice | Vulcan County | 7 | 2007 |
| Sibbald | Special Area No. 3 | 33 | 1991 |
| Skiff | Forty Mile No. 8, County of | 10 | 1991 |
| Smith | Lesser Slave River No. 124, MD of | 227 | 2021 |
| South Cooking Lake | Strathcona County | 291 | 2024 |
| Spedden | Smoky Lake County | 56 | 1991 |
| Spring Coulee | Cardston County | 43 | 2008 |
| Springbrook | Red Deer County | 1,534 | 2021 |
| Spruce View | Red Deer County | 138 | 2021 |
| St. Edouard | St. Paul No. 19, County of | 33 | 1991 |
| St. Francis | Leduc County | 15 | 1991 |
| St. Isidore | Northern Sunrise County | 236 | 2021 |
| St. Lina | St. Paul No. 19, County of | 24 | 1991 |
| St. Michael | Lamont County | 39 | 1991 |
| St. Vincent | St. Paul No. 19, County of | 43 | 1991 |
| Stanmore | Special Area No. 2 | | |
| Star | Lamont County | 32 | 1991 |
| Streamstown | Vermilion River, County of | 20 | 2015 |
| Strome (Note: Strome dissolved from village status on January 1, 2016.) | Flagstaff County | 232 | 2021 |
| Suffield (Note: Suffield dissolved from village status on January 1, 1930.) | Cypress County | 190 | 2021 |
| Sunnybrook | Leduc County | 50 | 2021 |
| Sunnynook | Special Area No. 2 | 13 | 1991 |
| Sunnyslope | Kneehill County | 28 | 2021 |
| Swalwell (Note: Swalwell dissolved from village status on December 31, 1945.) | Kneehill County | 93 | 2021 |
| Tangent | Birch Hills County | 39 | 1991 |
| Tawatinaw | Westlock County | 15 | 2021 |
| Teepee Creek | Grande Prairie No. 1, County of | 20 | 2024 |
| Tees | Lacombe County | 73 | 2021 |
| Telfordville | Leduc County | 35 | 2021 |
| Therien | Bonnyville No. 87, MD of | 71 | 2014 |
| Thorhild (Note: Thorhild dissolved from village status on March 18, 2009.) | Thorhild County | 391 | 2021 |
| Throne | Paintearth No. 18, County of | | |
| Thunder Lake | Barrhead No. 11, County of | 34 | 1991 |
| Tilley (Note: Tilley dissolved from village status on August 31, 2013.) | Newell, County of | 318 | 2021 |
| Tillicum Beach | Camrose County | 130 | 2021 |
| Tomahawk | Parkland County | 113 | 2021 |
| Torrington (Note: Torrington dissolved from village status on January 1, 1998.) | Kneehill County | 239 | 2021 |
| Travers | Vulcan County | 0 | 2007 |
| Tulliby Lake | Vermilion River, County of | 22 | 2015 |
| Turin | Lethbridge County | 72 | 2021 |
| Twin Butte | Pincher Creek No. 9, MD of | 10 | 2021 |
| Valhalla Centre | Grande Prairie No. 1, County of | 38 | 2024 |
| Veinerville | Cypress County | 70 | 2021 |
| Venice | Lac La Biche County | 22 | 2016 |
| Village at Pigeon Lake | Wetaskiwin No. 10, County of | 77 | 2006 |
| Villeneuve | Sturgeon County | 260 | 2021 |
| Vimy | Westlock County | 183 | 2021 |
| Violet Grove | Brazeau County | 141 | 2005 |
| Wabamun | Parkland County | 644 | 2021 |
| Wabasca (Note: Wabasca was formerly named Wabasca-Desmarais.) | Opportunity No. 17, MD of | 1,594 | 2021 |
| Wagner | Lesser Slave River No. 124, MD of | 171 (Note: Statistics Canada cautioned that Wagner's population from the 1991 census may be an estimate.) | 1991 |
| Walsh (Note: Walsh dissolved from village status on April 30, 1925.) | Cypress County | 50 | 2021 |
| Wandering River | Athabasca County | 63 | 1991 |
| Wanham (Note: Wanham dissolved from village status on December 31, 1999.) | Birch Hills County | 141 | 2021 |
| Wardlow | Special Area No. 2 | 28 | 1991 |
| Warspite (Note: Warspite dissolved from village status on June 1, 2000.) | Smoky Lake County | 70 | 2021 |
| Watino | Birch Hills County | 22 | 1991 |
| Watts | Special Area No. 2 | | |
| Wedgewood | Grande Prairie No. 1, County of | 736 | 2024 |
| Welling | Cardston County | 30 | 2008 |
| Welling Station | Cardston County | 18 | 2008 |
| Westerose | Wetaskiwin No. 10, County of | 63 | 1991 |
| Whitelaw | Fairview No. 136, MD of | 110 | 2021 |
| Whitford | Lamont County | 6 | 1981 |
| Whitla | Forty Mile No. 8, County of | | |
| Widewater | Lesser Slave River No. 124, MD of | 405 | 2021 |
| Wildwood (Note: Wildwood dissolved from village status on December 31, 1990.) | Yellowhead County | 257 | 2021 |
| Willingdon | Two Hills No. 21, County of | 249 | 2021 |
| Wimborne | Kneehill County | 15 | 2021 |
| Winfield | Wetaskiwin No. 10, County of | 193 | 2021 |
| Winnifred | Forty Mile No. 8, County of | 52 | 1956 |
| Withrow | Clearwater County | 50 | 1991 |
| Woking | Saddle Hills County | 62 | 2021 |
| Woodhouse | Willow Creek No. 26, MD of | 15 | 1991 |
| Woolford | Cardston County | 13 | 1986 |
| Worsley | Clear Hills County | 28 | 2008 |
| Wostok | Lamont County | 15 | 1991 |
| Wrentham | Warner No. 5, County of | 58 | 1991 |
| Zama City | Mackenzie County | 52 | 2021 |

=== Townsites ===
A townsite is a type of unincorporated community that is not officially defined under the Municipal Government Act (MGA), but it is generally regarded as an independent urban area within an Indian reserve that is comparable in population, land area, services, and built form, to that of Alberta's incorporated towns. Essentially, townsites would meet the eligibility requirements of the MGA to incorporate as a town if they were not on Indian reserve lands under federal jurisdiction.

Redwood Meadows is Alberta's only townsite at this time and is located within the Tsuutʼina Nation.

== Métis settlements ==
Métis settlements are rural areas inhabited by the indigenous Métis in Alberta and were established and recognized in 1936 under the Métis Population Betterment Act. The settlements provide an autonomous land base, allow better access to education, health and other social services, and provide economic development opportunities for the only recognized Métis land-base in Canada. Métis settlements now operate under the authority of the Métis Settlements Act. These eight Métis settlements are governed by a unique Métis government known as the Métis Settlements General Council (MSGC).

Alberta currently has eight Métis settlements, all of which are in the northern half of the province. The official names of the eight settlements, and the municipal districts they are within, are as follows:

List of Métis settlements in Alberta
| Name | Municipal district or specialized municipality | 2021 Census of Population | | | | |
| Name | Municipal district or specialized municipality | Population (2021) | Population (2016) | Change (%) | Land area (km^{2}) | Population density (/km^{2}) |
|---|---|---|---|---|---|---|
| Buffalo Lake | Smoky Lake County | 379 | 712 | −46.8% | 335.68 | 1.1 |
| East Prairie | Big Lakes County | 310 | 304 | +2.0% | 328.42 | 0.9 |
| Elizabeth | MD of Bonnyville No. 87 | 594 | 653 | −9.0% | 246.45 | 2.4 |
| Fishing Lake | MD of Bonnyville No. 87 | 414 | 446 | −7.2% | 348.64 | 1.2 |
| Gift Lake (Note: Gift Lake comprises two parts. The majority is located within Big Lakes County, while the balance is located within Northern Sunrise County. The Big Lakes County portion (part "A") had a population of 625 living on 802.46 km^{2} (309.83 mi^{2}) in 2021, while the Northern Sunrise County portion (part "B") had a population of 0 living on 0.83 km^{2} (0.32 mi^{2}).) | Big Lakes County; Northern Sunrise County | 625 | 658 | −5.0% | 803.29 | 0.8 |
| Kikino (Note: Kikino comprises two parts. The majority is located within Smoky Lake County, while the balance is located within Lac La Biche County. The Smoky Lake County portion (part "A") had a population of 978 living on 440.92 km^{2} (170.24 mi^{2}) in 2021, while the Lac La Biche County portion (part "B") had a population of 0 living on 0.77 km^{2} (0.30 mi^{2}).) | Smoky Lake County; Lac La Biche County | 978 | 934 | +4.7% | 441.69 | 2.2 |
| Paddle Prairie | County of Northern Lights | 551 | 544 | +1.3% | 1,726.45 | 0.3 |
| Peavine | Big Lakes County | 387 | 607 | −36.2% | 798.95 | 0.5 |
| Total Métis settlements | | 4,238 | 4,858 | −12.8% | 5,029.57 | 0.8 |

*Areas generated from provincial Métis settlement boundary data.

Very small portions of the Gift Lake Métis Settlement and the Kikino Métis Settlement are also located within Northern Sunrise County and Lac La Biche County respectively.

Alberta's eight Métis settlements have a combined population totalling 5,632 as of 2018.

== Indian reserves ==
Indian reserves in Alberta cover a total area of 656,660 ha (1,622,630 acres) and range in size from 441 ha (1,089 acres) to 143,529 ha (354,667 acres). Under the Constitution Act, 1982, legislative authority over Indian reserves is allocated to the Parliament of Canada. The Government of Canada exercises executive authority over Indian reserves through Indigenous and Northern Affairs Canada. Local administration is exercised by Band councils whose members are elected by members of the reserve.

Indian reserves of Alberta

List of Indian reserves and settlements in Alberta
| Name as used by Indigenous and Northern Affairs Canada | First Nation(s) | Ethnic/national group | Tribal council | Treaty | Area | | Population | | | Notes |
| Name as used by Indigenous and Northern Affairs Canada | First Nation(s) | Ethnic/national group | Tribal council | Treaty | ha | acre | 2016 | 2011 | % difference | Notes |
|---|---|---|---|---|---|---|---|---|---|---|
| Ɂejëre Kʼelnı Kuę́ 196I | Smith's Landing | Dene | | 8 | 213.0 | 526.3 | | | | INAC lists the reserve in Alberta and the band headquartered in Fort Smith, Northwest Territories |
| Alexander 134 | Alexander | Beaver Hills Cree | Yellowhead Tribal Development Foundation | 6 | 7,280.5 | 17,990.5 | 1,099 | 1,027 | 7.0% | |
| Alexander 134A | Alexander | Beaver Hills Cree | Yellowhead Tribal Development Foundation | 6 | 2,303.3 | 5,691.6 | | | | |
| Alexander 134B | Alexander | Beaver Hills Cree | Yellowhead Tribal Development Foundation | 6 | 3.4 | 8.4 | | | | |
| Alexis 133 | Alexis Nakota Sioux | Nakoda | Yellowhead Tribal Development Foundation | 6 | 6,175.2 | 15,259.3 | 755 | 817 | -7.6% | |
| Alexis Cardinal River 234 | Alexis Nakota Sioux | Nakoda | Yellowhead Tribal Development Foundation | 6 | 4,661.0 | 11,517.6 | | | | |
| Alexis Elk River 233 | Alexis Nakota Sioux | Nakoda | Yellowhead Tribal Development Foundation | 6 | 98.0 | 242.2 | | | | |
| Alexis Whitecourt 232 | Alexis Nakota Sioux | Nakoda | Yellowhead Tribal Development Foundation | 6 | 3,544.9 | 8,759.6 | | | | |
| Allison Bay 219 | Mikisew Cree | Woodland Cree | | 8 | 1,861.0 | 4,598.6 | 127 | 84 | 51.2% | |
| Amber River 211 | Dene Tha' | Slavey | North Peace Tribal Council | 8 | 2,332.3 | 5,763.2 | | | | |
| Assineau River 150F | Swan River | Woods Cree | Lesser Slave Lake Indian Regional Council | 8 | 71.6 | 176.9 | | | | |
| Beaver Lake 131 | Beaver Lake Cree | Cree | Tribal Chiefs Ventures Incorporated | 6 | 6,145.3 | 15,185.4 | 414 | 423 | -2.1% | |
| Beaver Ranch 163 | Tallcree Tribal Government | Anishinaabe | North Peace Tribal Council | 8 | 841.7 | 2,079.9 | 10 | 16 | -37.5% | |
| Beaver Ranch 163A | Tallcree Tribal Government | Anishinaabe | North Peace Tribal Council | 8 | 240.0 | 593.1 | | | | |
| Beaver Ranch 163B | Tallcree Tribal Government | Anishinaabe | North Peace Tribal Council | 8 | 226.0 | 558.5 | | | | |
| Big Horn 144A | Bearspaw; Chiniki; Stoney; Wesley | Nakoda | Stoney Nakoda - Tsuut'ina Tribal Council | 7 | 2,127.4 | 5,256.9 | 237 | 134 | 76.9% | |
| Bistcho Lake 213 | Dene Tha' | Slavey | North Peace Tribal Council | 8 | 354.1 | 875.0 | | | | |
| Blood 148 | Blood | Blackfoot Confederacy | Blackfoot Confederacy | 7 | 134,292.9 | 331,845.0 | 4,570 | 4,679 | -2.3% | |
| Blood 148A | Blood | Blackfoot Confederacy | Blackfoot Confederacy | 7 | 1,971.7 | 4,872.2 | | | | |
| Blue Quills First Nation Indian Reserve | Beaver Lake Cree; Cold Lake; Frog Lake; Heart Lake; Kehewin Cree; Saddle Lake | Cree; Chipewyan; Cree; Cree; Cree; Beaver Hills Cree | Tribal Chiefs Ventures Incorporated | 6 | 96.2 | 237.7 | | | | |
| Boyer 164 | Beaver | Dane-zaa | North Peace Tribal Council | 8 | 4,249.3 | 10,500.2 | 218 | 213 | 2.3% | |
| Buck Lake 133C | Paul | Cree / Nakoda | | 6 | 1,035.2 | 2,558.0 | | | | |
| Bushe River 207 | Dene Tha' | Slavey | North Peace Tribal Council | 8 | 111,675.0 | 275,954.9 | 503 | 492 | 2.2% | |
| Charles Lake 225 | Mikisew Cree | Woodland Cree | | 8 | 64.5 | 159.4 | | | | |
| Child Lake 164A | Beaver | Dane-zaa | North Peace Tribal Council | 8 | 1,035.2 | 2,558.0 | 216 | 188 | 14.9% | |
| Chipewyan 201 | Athabasca Chipewyan | Chipewyan | Athabasca Tribal Council | 8 | 20,072.4 | 49,600.0 | | | | |
| Chipewyan 201A | Athabasca Chipewyan | Chipewyan | Athabasca Tribal Council | 8 | 9,516.2 | 23,515.0 | 0 | 5 | -100.0% | |
| Chipewyan 201B | Athabasca Chipewyan | Chipewyan | Athabasca Tribal Council | 8 | 19.4 | 47.9 | | | | |
| Chipewyan 201C | Athabasca Chipewyan | Chipewyan | Athabasca Tribal Council | 8 | 18.2 | 45.0 | | | | |
| Chipewyan 201D | Athabasca Chipewyan | Chipewyan | Athabasca Tribal Council | 8 | 4.3 | 10.6 | | | | |
| Chipewyan 201E | Athabasca Chipewyan | Chipewyan | Athabasca Tribal Council | 8 | 4,165.5 | 10,293.2 | | | | |
| Chipewyan 201F | Athabasca Chipewyan | Chipewyan | Athabasca Tribal Council | 8 | 66.4 | 164.1 | | | | |
| Chipewyan 201G | Athabasca Chipewyan | Chipewyan | Athabasca Tribal Council | 8 | 905.3 | 2,237.0 | | | | |
| Clear Hills 152C | Horse Lake | Cree / Dane-zaa | Western Cree Tribal Council | 8 | 1,547.1 | 3,823.0 | | | | |
| Clearwater 175 | Fort McMurray #468 | Cree / Chipewyan | Athabasca Tribal Council | 8 | 915.4 | 2,262.0 | | | | |
| Cold Lake 149 | Cold Lake | Chipewyan | Tribal Chiefs Ventures Incorporated | 6 | 14,528.1 | 35,899.7 | 671 | 594 | 13.0% | |
| Cold Lake 149A | Cold Lake | Chipewyan | Tribal Chiefs Ventures Incorporated | 6 | 71.6 | 176.9 | 40 | 45 | -11.1% | |
| Cold Lake 149B | Cold Lake | Chipewyan | Tribal Chiefs Ventures Incorporated | 6 | 4,134.0 | 10,215.3 | 163 | 149 | 9.4% | |
| Cold Lake 149C | Cold Lake | Chipewyan | Tribal Chiefs Ventures Incorporated | 6 | 2,023.5 | 5,000.2 | | | | |
| Collin Lake 223 | Mikisew Cree | Woodland Cree | | 8 | 36.4 | 89.9 | | | | |
| Cornwall Lake 224 | Mikisew Cree | Woodland Cree | | 8 | 69.3 | 171.2 | | | | |
| Cowper Lake 194A | Chipewyan Prairie | Chipewyan | Athabasca Tribal Council | 8 | 143.0 | 353.4 | | | | |
| Devil's Gate 220 | Mikisew Cree | Woodland Cree | | 8 | 819.1 | 2,024.0 | | | | |
| Dog Head 218 | Mikisew Cree | Woodland Cree | | 8 | 34.8 | 86.0 | 99 | 111 | -10.8% | |
| Drift Pile River 150 | Driftpile Cree | Cree | Lesser Slave Lake Indian Regional Council | 8 | 6,354.8 | 15,703.1 | 828 | 800 | 3.5% | |
| Duncans 151A | Duncan's | Woods Cree | Western Cree Tribal Council | 8 | 2,036.8 | 5,033.0 | 150 | 164 | -8.5% | |
| Eden Valley 216 | Bearspaw; Chiniki; Stoney; Wesley | Nakoda | Stoney Nakoda - Tsuut'ina Tribal Council | 7 | 1,690.8 | 4,178.1 | 596 | 587 | 1.5% | |
| Enoch Cree Nation 135 | Enoch Cree | Beaver Hills Cree | | 6 | 5,306.2 | 13,111.9 | 1,690 | 987 | 71.2% | Was Stony Plain 135 |
| Enoch Cree Nation No. 135A | Enoch Cree | Beaver Hills Cree | | 6 | 2.0 | 4.9 | | | | |
| Ermineskin 138 | Ermineskin Tribe | Cree | Maskwacis Cree Tribal Council | 6 | 10,295.8 | 25,441.5 | 2,457 | 1,874 | 31.1% | |
| Fitzgerald No. 196 | Salt River First Nation #195 | Dene | Akaitcho Territory Government | 8 | 3,715.0 | 9,180.0 | | | | Headquartered in the NWT |
| Fort McKay 174 | Fort McKay | Cree / Dene | Athabasca Tribal Council | 8 | 3,106.7 | 7,676.8 | | | | |
| Fort McKay 174C | Fort McKay | Cree / Dene | Athabasca Tribal Council | 8 | 3,381.4 | 8,355.6 | | | | |
| Fort McKay 174D | Fort McKay | Cree / Dene | Athabasca Tribal Council | 8 | 660.8 | 1,632.9 | | | | |
| Fort Vermilion 173B | Tallcree Tribal Government | Anishinaabe | North Peace Tribal Council | 8 | 49.7 | 122.8 | 96 | 97 | -1.0% | |
| Fox Lake 162 | Little Red River Cree | Woods Cree | North Peace Tribal Council | 8 | 10,438.3 | 25,793.6 | 2,032 | 1,875 | 8.4% | |
| Gregoire Lake 176 | Fort McMurray #468 | Cree / Chipewyan | Athabasca Tribal Council | 8 | 2,231.9 | 5,515.1 | 191 | 274 | -30.3% | |
| Gregoire Lake 176A | Fort McMurray #468 | Cree / Chipewyan | Athabasca Tribal Council | 8 | 67.4 | 166.5 | 130 | 0 | | |
| Gregoire Lake 176B | Fort McMurray #468 | Cree / Chipewyan | Athabasca Tribal Council | 8 | 17.0 | 42.0 | | | | |
| Hay Lake 209 | Dene Tha' | Slavey | North Peace Tribal Council | 8 | 12,355.3 | 30,530.6 | 883 | 949 | -7.0% | |
| Heart Lake 167 | Heart Lake | Cree | Tribal Chiefs Ventures Incorporated | 6 | 4,496.2 | 11,110.4 | 184 | 159 | 15.7% | |
| Heart Lake 167A | Heart Lake | Cree | Tribal Chiefs Ventures Incorporated | 6 | 8.3 | 20.5 | | | | |
| Hokedhe Túe 196E | Smith's Landing | Chipewyan | | 8 | 440.4 | 1,088.3 | | | | INAC lists the reserve in Alberta and the band headquartered in Fort Smith, Northwest Territories |
| Horse Lakes 152B | Horse Lake | Cree / Dane-zaa | Western Cree Tribal Council | 8 | 1,552.0 | 3,835.1 | 469 | 402 | 16.7% | |
| Jackfish Point 214 | Dene Tha' | Slavey | North Peace Tribal Council | 8 | 103.6 | 256.0 | | | | |
| Janvier 194 | Chipewyan Prairie | Chipewyan | Athabasca Tribal Council | 8 | 2,486.7 | 6,144.8 | 414 | 295 | 40.3% | |
| Jean Baptiste Gambler 183 | Bigstone Cree | Woods Cree | | 8 | 198.7 | 491.0 | 253 | 254 | -0.4% | |
| John D'Or Prairie 215 | Little Red River Cree | Woods Cree | North Peace Tribal Council | 8 | 14,034.0 | 34,678.8 | 1,196 | 1,123 | 6.5% | |
| K'i Túe 196D | Smith's Landing | Chipewyan | | 8 | 484.3 | 1,196.7 | | | | INAC lists the reserve in Alberta and the band headquartered in Fort Smith, Northwest Territories |
| Kapawe'no First Nation 150B | Kapawe'no | Woods Cree | Lesser Slave Lake Indian Regional Council | 8 | 29.6 | 73.1 | 154 | 115 | 33.9% | |
| Kapawe'no First Nation 150C | Kapawe'no | Woods Cree | Lesser Slave Lake Indian Regional Council | 8 | 21.0 | 51.9 | | | | |
| Kapawe'no First Nation 150D | Kapawe'no | Woods Cree | Lesser Slave Lake Indian Regional Council | 8 | 390.1 | 964.0 | 5 | 5 | 0.0% | |
| Kapawe'no First Nation 229 | Kapawe'no | Woods Cree | Lesser Slave Lake Indian Regional Council | 8 | 129.0 | 318.8 | | | | |
| Kapawe'no First Nation 230 | Kapawe'no | Woods Cree | Lesser Slave Lake Indian Regional Council | 8 | 846.0 | 2,090.5 | | | | |
| Kapawe'no First Nation 231 | Kapawe'no | Woods Cree | Lesser Slave Lake Indian Regional Council | 8 | 147.0 | 363.2 | | | | |
| Kehewin 123 | Kehewin Cree | Cree | Tribal Chiefs Ventures Incorporated | 6 | 8,225.0 | 20,324.4 | 976 | 1,065 | -8.4% | |
| Li Dezé 196C | Smith's Landing | Chipewyan | | 8 | 729.4 | 1,802.4 | | | | INAC lists the reserve in Alberta and the band headquartered in Fort Smith, Northwest Territories |
| Loon Lake 235 | Loon River Cree | Woods Cree | Kee Tas Kee Now Tribal Council | 8 | 6,902.3 | 17,056.0 | 555 | 511 | 8.6% | |
| Loon Prairie 237 | Loon River Cree | Woods Cree | Kee Tas Kee Now Tribal Council | 8 | 259.6 | 641.5 | | | | |
| Louis Bull 138B | Louis Bull | Beaver Hills Cree | Maskwacis Cree Tribal Council | 6 | 3,388.1 | 8,372.2 | 1,177 | 1,309 | -10.1% | |
| Makaoo 120 | Onion Lake Cree | Cree | | 6 | 5,626.6 | 13,903.6 | 208 | 180 | 15.6% | Headquartered in Saskatchewan |
| Montana 139 | Montana | Cree | Maskwacis Cree Tribal Council | 6 | 2,824.8 | 6,980.2 | 630 | 653 | -3.5% | |
| Namur Lake 174B | Fort McKay | Cree / Dene | Athabasca Tribal Council | 8 | 3,122.2 | 7,715.1 | | | | |
| Namur River 174A | Fort McKay | Cree / Dene | Athabasca Tribal Council | 8 | 4,614.9 | 11,403.7 | | | | |
| O'Chiese 203 | O'Chiese | Anishinaabe | Yellowhead Tribal Development Foundation | 6 | 14,131.9 | 34,920.7 | 789 | 751 | 5.1% | |
| O'Chiese Cemetery 203A | O'Chiese | Anishinaabe | Yellowhead Tribal Development Foundation | 6 | 0.1 | 0.2 | | | | |
| Old Fort 217 | Mikisew Cree | Woodland Cree | | 8 | 1,509.0 | 3,728.8 | | | | |
| Peace Point 222 | Mikisew Cree | Woodland Cree | | 8 | 518.0 | 1,280.0 | | | | |
| Peerless Trout 238 | Peerless Trout | Woods Cree | Kee Tas Kee Now Tribal Council | 8 | 3,553.2 | 8,780.1 | | | | |
| Peigan Timber Limit "B" | Piikani | Piegan Blackfeet | Blackfoot Confederacy | 7 | 2,978.6 | 7,360.3 | | | | |
| Pigeon Lake 138A | Ermineskin Tribe; Louis Bull; Montana; Samson | Beaver Hills Cree; Beaver Hills Cree; Cree; Beaver Hills Cree | Maskwacis Cree Tribal Council | 6 | 1,921.1 | 4,747.1 | 429 | 485 | -11.5% | |
| PiikanI | Piikani | Piegan Blackfeet | Blackfoot Confederacy | 7 | 42,699.2 | 105,512.0 | 1,544 | 1,217 | 26.9% | |
| Puskiakiwenin 122 | Frog Lake | Cree | Tribal Chiefs Ventures Incorporated | 6 | 10,339.1 | 25,548.5 | 531 | 484 | 9.7% | |
| Saddle Lake 125 | Saddle Lake Cree | Beaver Hills Cree | | 6 | 25,780.6 | 63,705.2 | UN | UN | UN | |
| Samson 137 | Samson | Beaver Hills Cree | Maskwacis Cree Tribal Council | 6 | 13,552.0 | 33,487.7 | 3,373 | 3,746 | -10.0% | |
| Samson 137A | Samson | Beaver Hills Cree | Maskwacis Cree Tribal Council | 6 | 134.4 | 332.1 | 26 | 38 | -31.6% | |
| Sandy Point 221 | Mikisew Cree | Woodland Cree | | 8 | 204.0 | 504.1 | | | | |
| Sawridge 150G | Sawridge | Woods Cree | Lesser Slave Lake Indian Regional Council | 8 | 906.5 | 2,240.0 | 20 | 48 | -58.3% | |
| Sawridge 150H | Sawridge | Woods Cree | Lesser Slave Lake Indian Regional Council | 8 | 1,236.8 | 3,056.2 | 10 | 20 | -50.0% | |
| Siksika 146 | Siksika | Piegan Blackfeet | Blackfoot Confederacy | 7 | 71,087.5 | 175,661.0 | 3,479 | 2,972 | 17.1% | |
| Stoney 142-143-144 | Bearspaw; Chiniki; Stoney; Wesley | Nakoda | Stoney Nakoda - Tsuut'ina Tribal Council | 7 | 39,264.5 | 97,024.7 | 3,713 | 3,494 | 6.3% | |
| Stoney 142B | Bearspaw; Chiniki; Stoney; Wesley | Nakoda | Stoney Nakoda - Tsuut'ina Tribal Council | 7 | 5,692.4 | 14,066.2 | | | | |
| Sturgeon Lake 154 | Sturgeon Lake Cree | Woods Cree | Western Cree Tribal Council | 8 | 14,814.3 | 36,606.9 | 1,447 | 1,162 | 24.5% | |
| Sturgeon Lake 154A | Sturgeon Lake Cree | Woods Cree | Western Cree Tribal Council | 8 | 753.1 | 1,861.0 | 53 | 24 | 120.8% | |
| Sturgeon Lake 154B | Sturgeon Lake Cree | Woods Cree | Western Cree Tribal Council | 8 | 97.1 | 239.9 | | | | |
| Sucker Creek 150A | Sucker Creek | Woods Cree | Lesser Slave Lake Indian Regional Council | 8 | 5,987.0 | 14,794.2 | 689 | 677 | 1.8% | |
| Sunchild 202 | Sunchild | Beaver Hills Cree | Yellowhead Tribal Development Foundation | 6 | 5,218.1 | 12,894.2 | 749 | 677 | 10.6% | |
| Swampy Lake 236 | Loon River Cree | Woods Cree | Kee Tas Kee Now Tribal Council | 8 | 14,744.4 | 36,434.2 | 413 | 312 | 32.4% | |
| Swan River 150E | Swan River | Woods Cree | Lesser Slave Lake Indian Regional Council | 8 | 4,271.1 | 10,554.1 | 250 | 202 | 23.8% | |
| Tall Cree 173 | Tallcree Tribal Government | Anishinaabe | North Peace Tribal Council | 8 | 4,031.5 | 9,962.1 | 224 | 163 | 37.4% | |
| Tall Cree 173A | Tallcree Tribal Government | Anishinaabe | North Peace Tribal Council | 8 | 2,723.4 | 6,729.7 | 28 | 0 | | |
| Thabacha Náre 196A | Smith's Landing | Chipewyan | | 8 | 397.2 | 981.5 | 20 | 30 | -33.3% | INAC lists the reserve in Alberta and the band headquartered in Fort Smith, Northwest Territories |
| Thebathi 196 | Smith's Landing | Chipewyan | | 8 | 6,524.0 | 16,121.2 | | | | INAC lists the reserve in Alberta and the band headquartered in Fort Smith, Northwest Territories |
| Tsu K'adhe Túe 196F | Smith's Landing | Chipewyan | | 8 | 231.6 | 572.3 | | | | INAC lists the reserve in Alberta and the band headquartered in Fort Smith, Northwest Territories |
| Tsu Nedehe Tue 196H | Smith's Landing | Chipewyan | | 8 | 586.0 | 1,448.0 | | | | INAC lists the reserve in Alberta and the band headquartered in Fort Smith, Northwest Territories |
| Tsu Túe 196G | Smith's Landing | Chipewyan | | 8 | 42.7 | 105.5 | | | | INAC lists the reserve in Alberta and the band headquartered in Fort Smith, Northwest Territories |
| Tsuu T'ina Nation 145 | Tsuut'ina | Dene | Stoney Nakoda - Tsuut'ina Tribal Council | 7 | 29,417.4 | 72,692.0 | 1,643 | 2,052 | -19.9% | |
| Tthejëre Ghaı̨lı̨ 196B | Smith's Landing | Chipewyan | | 8 | 401.1 | 991.1 | | | | INAC lists the reserve in Alberta and the band headquartered in Fort Smith, Northwest Territories |
| Unipouheos 121 | Frog Lake | Cree | Tribal Chiefs Ventures Incorporated | 6 | 8,506.3 | 21,019.5 | 909 | 813 | 11.8% | |
| Upper Hay River 212 | Dene Tha' | Slavey | North Peace Tribal Council | 8 | 1,418.0 | 3,504.0 | 294 | 292 | 0.7% | |
| Utikoomak Lake 155 | Whitefish Lake | Woods Cree | Kee Tas Kee Now Tribal Council | 8 | 6,756.1 | 16,694.7 | 723 | 644 | 12.3% | |
| Utikoomak Lake 155A | Whitefish Lake | Woods Cree | Kee Tas Kee Now Tribal Council | 8 | 1,041.0 | 2,572.4 | 127 | 121 | 5.0% | |
| Utikoomak Lake 155B | Whitefish Lake | Woods Cree | Kee Tas Kee Now Tribal Council | 8 | 502.6 | 1,242.0 | | | | |
| Wabamun 133A | Paul | Cree / Nakoda | | 6 | 6,116.9 | 15,115.2 | 1,592 | 1,069 | 48.9% | |
| Wabamun 133B | Paul | Cree / Nakoda | | 6 | 178.5 | 441.1 | 30 | 17 | 76.5% | |
| Wabasca 166 | Bigstone Cree | Woods Cree | | 8 | 8,452.4 | 20,886.3 | 160 | 152 | 5.3% | |
| Wabasca 166A | Bigstone Cree | Woods Cree | | 8 | 682.1 | 1,685.5 | 658 | 738 | -10.8% | |
| Wabasca 166B | Bigstone Cree | Woods Cree | | 8 | 2,413.4 | 5,963.6 | 190 | 250 | -24.0% | |
| Wabasca 166C | Bigstone Cree | Woods Cree | | 8 | 3,502.6 | 8,655.1 | 188 | 182 | 3.3% | |
| Wabasca 166D | Bigstone Cree | Woods Cree | | 8 | 5,817.4 | 14,375.1 | 961 | 885 | 8.6% | |
| Wadlin Lake 173C | Tallcree Tribal Government | Anishinaabe | North Peace Tribal Council | 8 | 48.0 | 118.6 | | | | |
| White Fish Lake 128 | Saddle Lake Cree | Beaver Hills Cree | | 6 | 4,542.7 | 11,225.3 | 1,310 | 1,188 | 10.3% | |
| William McKenzie 151K | Duncan's | Woods Cree | Western Cree Tribal Council | 8 | 389.3 | 962.0 | | | | |
| Winefred Lake 194B | Chipewyan Prairie | Chipewyan | Athabasca Tribal Council | 8 | 450.0 | 1,112.0 | | | | |
| Woodland Cree 226 | Woodland Cree | Woodland Cree | Kee Tas Kee Now Tribal Council | 8 | 11,660.0 | 28,812.5 | 723 | 706 | 2.4% | |
| Woodland Cree 227 | Woodland Cree | Woodland Cree | Kee Tas Kee Now Tribal Council | 8 | 660.0 | 1,630.9 | | | | |
| Woodland Cree 228 | Woodland Cree | Woodland Cree | Kee Tas Kee Now Tribal Council | 8 | 3,786.0 | 9,355.4 | 150 | 143 | 4.9% | |
| Zama Lake 210 | Dene Tha' | Slavey | North Peace Tribal Council | 8 | 2,307.2 | 5,701.2 | | | | |

== See also ==
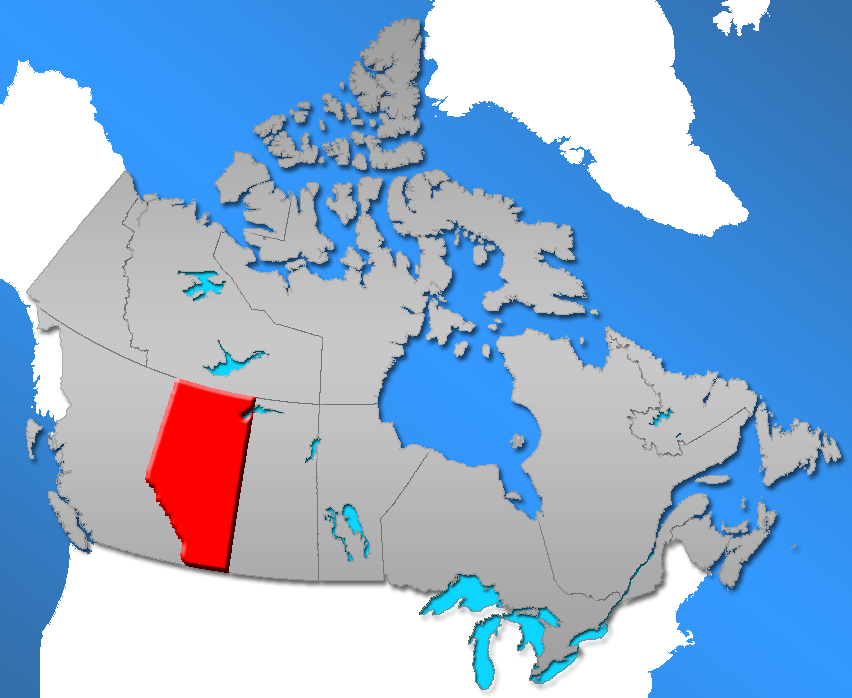
Communities in Canada's provinces and territories
- List of census divisions of Alberta
- List of designated places in Alberta
- List of ghost towns in Alberta
- List of municipalities in Alberta
- List of population centres in Alberta
- List of settlements in Alberta
