= Municipal District of Willow Creek No. 26 =

Municipal district in Alberta, Canada

- Municipal district
- Logo

- Location within Alberta
- Country: Canada
- Province: Alberta
- Region: Southern Alberta
- Census division: No. 3
- Established: 1954
- Incorporated: 1954

Government
  - Reeve: Earl Hemmaway
  - Governing body: MD of Willow Creek Council
  - Administrative office: west of Claresholm

Area (2021)
  - Land: 4,485.05 km^{2} (1,731.69 sq mi)

Population (2021)
  - Total: 6,081
  - Density: 1.4/km^{2} (3.6/sq mi)
- Time zone: UTC−06:00 (Alberta Time)
- Website: mdwillowcreek.com

The Municipal District of Willow Creek No. 26 is a municipal district (MD) in southern Alberta, Canada. Located in Census Division No. 3, its municipal office is located adjacent to Claresholm Industrial Airport, west of the Town of Claresholm.

== History ==
The MD of Willow Creek No. 26 was incorporated on January 1, 1954.

== Geography ==
=== Communities and localities ===
The following urban municipalities are surrounded by the MD of Willow Creek No. 26.

Cities

- none

Towns

- Claresholm
- Fort Macleod
- Nanton
- Stavely

Villages

- none

Summer villages

- none

The following hamlets are located within the MD of Willow Creek No. 26.

Hamlets

- Granum
- Moon River Estates
- Orton
- Parkland
- Woodhouse

The following localities are located within the MD of Willow Creek No. 26.

Localities

- Ardenville
- Blacktail
- Durward
- Furman
- Lyndon
- Mekastoe

- Muirhead
- Nolan
- Pearce
- Pulteney
- Spring Point
- Stowe

== Demographics ==
In the 2021 Census of Population conducted by Statistics Canada, the MD of Willow Creek No. 26 had a population of 6,081 living in 1,882 of its 2,115 total private dwellings, a change of 9.1% from its 2016 population of 5,575. With a land area of 4,485.05 km^{2} (1,731.69 sq mi), it had a population density of 1.4/km^{2} (3.5/sq mi) in 2021.

In the 2016 Census of Population conducted by Statistics Canada, the MD of Willow Creek No. 26 had a population of 5,179 living in 1,671 of its 1,863 total private dwellings, a 1.4% change from its 2011 population of 5,107. With a land area of 4,558.14 km^{2} (1,759.91 sq mi), it had a population density of 1.1/km^{2} (2.9/sq mi) in 2016.

== See also ==
- List of communities in Alberta
- List of municipal districts in Alberta
