= Woodhouse, Alberta =

Woodhouse
- Hamlet
- Location of Woodhouse Woodhouse (Canada)
- Coordinates: 49°56′30″N 113°32′22″W
- Country: Canada
- Province: Alberta
- Region: Southern Alberta
- Census division: 3
- Municipal district: Municipal District of Willow Creek No. 26

Government
  - Type: Unincorporated
  - Governing body: Municipal District of Willow Creek No. 26 Council

Population (1991)
  - Total: 15
- Time zone: UTC−06:00 (Alberta Time)
- Area codes: 403, 587, 825

Woodhouse is a hamlet in southern Alberta, Canada within the Municipal District of Willow Creek No. 26. It is located on Highway 2, approximately 58 kilometres (36 mi) northwest of Lethbridge.

== History ==
During the Second World War, the Royal Canadian Air Force established a Relief Aerodrome near the hamlet.

== Demographics ==
Woodhouse recorded a population of 15 in the 1991 Census of Population conducted by Statistics Canada.

== See also ==
- List of communities in Alberta
- List of hamlets in Alberta
