= Notorious Cree =

Cree hoop dancer and social media influencer

- Born: James Jones; Alberta
- Occupations: Hoop dancer, social media influencer

James Jones, professionally known as Notorious Cree, is a Cree hoop dancer and social media influencer from the Tallcree First Nation. He first rose to fame through his dancing, which combines traditional indigenous styles of dance with breakdancing, before creating his social media account in 2020. He was named to the Time 100 Creators in 2025.

== Biography ==
He hails from the Tallcree First Nation in Northern Alberta, and grew up in a small community in Northern Alberta. He began breakdancing at a young age. He moved to Edmonton at age 10, and struggled to make friends. This led to him beginning to use drugs and alcohol. A grass dancer intervened, telling Jones he should begin dancing at pow-wows and loaning him his gear on the condition that he didn't drink or party. This became his passion and helped him find his community. He also earned a degree in social work.

He subsequently began hoop dancing at the age of 24. By 2018, at 32, he was ranked in the top 5 hoop dancers in the world. He performed hoop dancing at the 2010 Winter Olympics, Coachella, and the Sydney Opera House, among other places, and appeared on So You Think You Can Dance Canada in 2009. In 2018, his hoop-dancing regalia was stolen from his car. He appeared on So You Think You Can Dance Canada again in 2019, where he was a finalist. He also danced for A Tribe Called Red's world tour. Many of his performances include a blend of hip hop and traditional dancing.

He created a social media account in January 2020 and began creating social media content in March 2020 during the COVID-19 pandemic, as all of his performances were cancelled. He went viral from a post in April doing a TikTok trend using hoop dancing. He went from 35 followers to 400,000 followers from that post. His content has both included viral trends and discussion of traditional cultural aspects. He has faced racism on social media. He has had partnerships with TikTok Canada. He avoids sharing elements that he feels are "too spiritual or too sacred".

He was featured as the star of the first episode of MTV's Hidden Healers, discussing hoop dancing, mental health, and Cree tradition. He is an artist ambassador for the Gord Downie & Chanie Wenjack Fund, which focuses on cultural understanding between Indigenous and non-Indigenous Canadians. He won the Entrepeneurial Spirit Award from the Indigenous Entrepeneur Awards in 2023.

As of 2025, he had about 6 million followers. That year, he was named to the Time 100 Creators. In 2026, he worked with an organization called End The Silence to advocate for mental health for First Nations men.
