= Moon River Estates =

- Hamlet
- Location of Moon River Estates Moon River Estates (Canada)
- Coordinates: 49°43′58″N 113°08′07″W
- Country: Canada
- Province: Alberta
- Region: Southern Alberta
- Census division: 3
- Municipal district: Municipal District of Willow Creek No. 26

Government
  - Type: Unincorporated
  - Governing body: Municipal District of Willow Creek No. 26 Council

Area (2021)
  - Land: 1.5 km^{2} (0.58 sq mi)

Population (2021)
  - Total: 145
  - Density: 96.5/km^{2} (250/sq mi)
- Time zone: UTC−06:00 (Alberta Time)
- Area codes: 403, 587, 825

Moon River Estates is a hamlet in southern Alberta, Canada within the Municipal District of Willow Creek No. 26 that was declared on October 17, 1984. It is located 6 kilometres (3.7 mi) south of Highway 3, approximately 22 kilometres (14 mi) west of Lethbridge.

== Demographics ==
Population history of Moon River Estates
| Year | Pop. | ±% |
|---|---|---|
| 1981 | 101 | — |
| 1986 | 117 | +15.8% |
| 1991 | 131 | +12.0% |
| 1991A | 132 | +0.8% |
| 1996 | 132 | +0.0% |
| 2001 | 143 | +8.3% |
| 2006 | 125 | −12.6% |
| 2011 | 127 | +1.6% |
| 2016 | 126 | −0.8% |
| 2021 | 145 | +15.1% |
Source: Statistics Canada

In the 2021 Census of Population conducted by Statistics Canada, Moon River Estates had a population of 145 living in 56 of its 59 total private dwellings, a change of 15.1% from its 2016 population of 126. With a land area of 1.5 km^{2} (0.58 sq mi), it had a population density of 96.7/km^{2} (250.4/sq mi) in 2021.

As a designated place in the 2016 Census of Population conducted by Statistics Canada, Moon River Estates had a population of 126 living in 54 of its 57 total private dwellings, a change of −0.8% from its 2011 population of 127. With a land area of 1.73 km^{2} (0.67 sq mi), it had a population density of 73.4/km^{2} (190.1/sq mi) in 2016.

== See also ==
- List of communities in Alberta
- List of designated places in Alberta
- List of hamlets in Alberta
