= Parkland, Alberta =

Parkland
- Hamlet
- Location of Parkland Parkland (Canada)
- Coordinates: 50°15′22″N 113°39′31″W
- Country: Canada
- Province: Alberta
- Region: Southern Alberta
- Census division: 3
- Municipal district: Municipal District of Willow Creek No. 26

Government
  - Type: Unincorporated
  - Governing body: Municipal District of Willow Creek No. 26 Council

Population (1991)
  - Total: 50
- Time zone: UTC−06:00 (Alberta Time)
- Area codes: 403, 587, 825

Parkland is a hamlet in southern Alberta, Canada within the Municipal District of Willow Creek No. 26. It is located on Highway 2, approximately 86 kilometres (53 mi) northwest of Lethbridge.

== Demographics ==
Population history of Parkland
Year	Pop.	±%
1941	91	—
1951	78	−14.3%
1956	92	+17.9%
1961	96	+4.3%
1966	70	−27.1%
1971	77	+10.0%
1976	66	−14.3%
1981	60	−9.1%
1986	56	−6.7%
1991	50	−10.7%
Source: Statistics Canada

Parkland recorded a population of 50 in the 1991 Census of Population conducted by Statistics Canada.

== See also ==
- List of communities in Alberta
- List of hamlets in Alberta
