= Tallcree 173A =

Indian reserve in Tallcree, Alberta, Canada

Coordinates: 58°05′03″N 115°36′57″W

Tallcree 173A North Tallcree
- Indian reserve
- Tallcree Indian Reserve No. 173A
- Location in Alberta
- First Nation: Tallcree
- Treaty: 8
- Country: Canada
- Province: Alberta
- Specialized municipality: Mackenzie

Area
  - Total: 53.66 km^{2} (20.72 sq mi)

Population (2021)
  - Total: 201
  - Density: 3.75/km^{2} (9.70/sq mi)
- Time zone: UTC−06:00 (Alberta Time)

Tallcree 173A, also known as North Tallcree, is an Indian reserve of the Tallcree First Nation in Alberta, located within Mackenzie County. It is 40 kilometres (25 mi) southeast of Fort Vermilion. In the 2021 Canadian Census, Tallcree 173A had a recorded population of 201 living in 50 of its 56 total private dwellings.
