= Tallcree 173 =

Coordinates: 57°54′27″N 115°24′46″W

Tallcree 173 South Tallcree
- Indian reserve
- Tallcree Indian Reserve No. 173
- Location in Alberta
- First Nation: Tallcree
- Treaty: 8
- Country: Canada
- Province: Alberta
- Specialized municipality: Mackenzie

Area
  - Total: 4,031.5 ha (9,962 acres)

Population (2016)
  - Total: 250
  - Density: 6.2/km^{2} (16/sq mi)
- Time zone: UTC−06:00 (Alberta Time)

Tallcree 173, also known as South Tallcree, is an Indian reserve of the Tallcree First Nation in Alberta, located within Mackenzie County. In the 2016 Canadian Census, it recorded a population of 250 living in 51 of its 53 total private dwellings.
