= Beaver Ranch 163B =

Coordinates: 58°31′33″N 115°47′30″W

- Indian reserve
- Beaver Ranch Indian Reserve No. 163B
- Location in Alberta
- First Nation: Tallcree
- Treaty: 8
- Country: Canada
- Province: Alberta
- Specialized municipality: Mackenzie

Area
  - Total: 226 ha (560 acres)
- Time zone: UTC−06:00 (Alberta Time)

Beaver Ranch 163B is an Indian reserve of the Tallcree First Nation in Alberta, located within Mackenzie County. It is 78 kilometres east of High Level.
