= Beaver First Nation =

Danezaa First Nation in Alberta, Canada

- Band No. 445
- Tsa'tinne
- People: Dane-zaa
- Treaty: Treaty 8 of 1899
- Headquarters: Boyer River
- Province: Alberta

Land
- Main reserve: Boyer 164
- Reserve: Child Lake 164A
- Land area: 70.75 km^{2} (27.32 sq mi)

Population (2019)
- On reserve: 449
- On other land: 38
- Off reserve: 660
- Total population: 1147

Government
- Chief: Gary Kipling
- Council size: 4

Tribal Council
- North Peace Tribal Council

Website
- beaverfirstnation.com

The Beaver First Nation (Dane-zaa: Tsa'tinne) is a First Nation government or band, made up of members of the Danezaa people, also known as the Beavers. The Beaver First Nation is one of only two Danezaa bands in Alberta (the other being the Horse Lake First Nation), but there are several others nearby in British Columbia. The band controls two reserves, Boyer 164 and Child Lake 164A both near Fort Vermilion, Alberta in the Peace Country of Northern Alberta. The band is a member of the North Peace Tribal Council and is party to Treaty 8. In April 2016, the band had a registered population of 1,065, more than half of which lived off reserve.
