= Beaver Ranch 163A =

Coordinates: 58°27′52″N 115°43′03″W

- Indian reserve
- Beaver Ranch Indian Reserve No. 163A
- Location in Alberta
- First Nation: Tallcree
- Treaty: 8
- Country: Canada
- Province: Alberta
- Specialized municipality: Mackenzie

Area
  - Total: 240 ha (590 acres)
- Time zone: UTC−06:00 (Alberta Time)

Beaver Ranch 163A is an Indian reserve of the Tallcree First Nation in Alberta, located within Mackenzie County. It is 82 kilometres east of High Level.
