= Child Lake 164A =

Coordinates: 58°28′04″N 116°34′28″W

- Indian reserve
- Child Lake Indian Reserve No. 164A
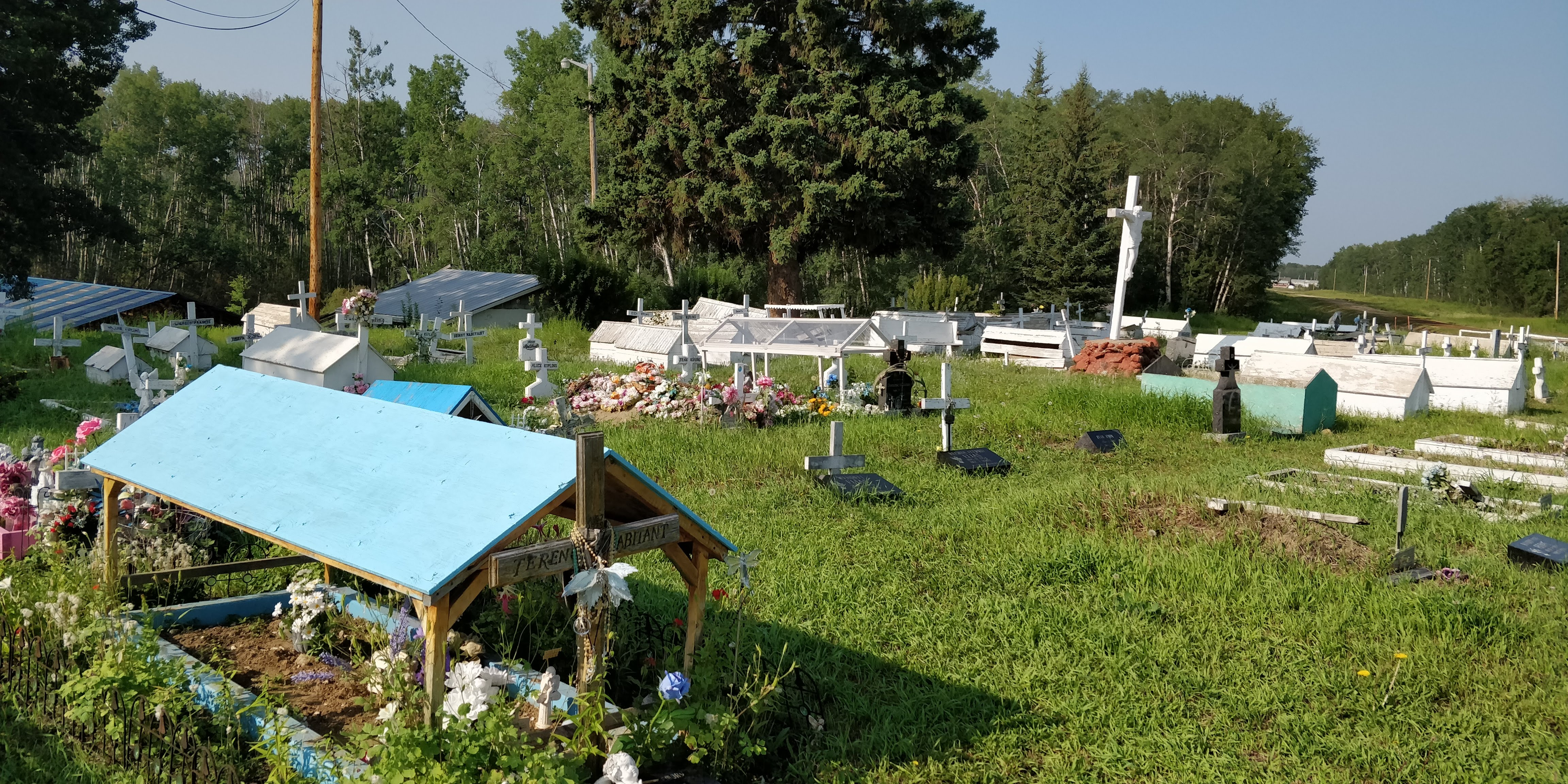
- Dunne-za burial houses at Child Lake

- Location in Alberta
- First Nation: Beaver
- Treaty: 8
- Country: Canada
- Province: Alberta
- Specialized municipality: Mackenzie

Area
  - Total: 2,826 ha (6,980 acres)

Population (2016)
  - Total: 216
  - Density: 7.64/km^{2} (19.8/sq mi)
- Time zone: UTC−06:00 (Alberta Time)

Child Lake 164A is an Indian reserve of the Beaver First Nation in Alberta, located within Mackenzie County. It is 32 kilometres northwest of Fort Vermilion. The reserve takes its name from a nearby lake where a child once drowned.

== Geography ==
The locality of Eleske is on the Child Lake 164A reserve.

== Demographics ==
In the 2016 Canadian Census, Child Lake 164A recorded a population of 216 living in 62 of its 62 total private dwellings.
