= Fort Vermilion 173B =

Coordinates: 58°22′56″N 115°59′54″W

- Indian reserve
- Fort Vermilion Indian Reserve No. 173B
- Location in Alberta
- First Nation: Tallcree
- Treaty: 8
- Country: Canada
- Province: Alberta
- Specialized municipality: Mackenzie

Area
  - Total: 49.7 ha (123 acres)

Population (2016)
  - Total: 96
  - Density: 190/km^{2} (500/sq mi)
- Time zone: UTC−06:00 (Alberta Time)

Fort Vermilion 173B is an Indian reserve of the Tallcree First Nation in Alberta, located within Mackenzie County. It is 1 kilometre southwest of Fort Vermilion. In the 2016 Canadian Census, it recorded a population of 96 living in 23 of its 25 total private dwellings.
