= Tallcree First Nation =

First Nation in Alberta, Canada

- Band No. 446
- People: Woodland Cree
- Treaty: Treaty 8
- Headquarters: Fort Vermilion
- Province: Alberta

Land
- Other reserves: Beaver Ranch 163; Beaver Ranch 163A; Beaver Ranch 163B; Fort Vermilion 173B; Tallcree 173; Tallcree 173A; Wadlin Lake 173C
- Land area: 81.603 km^{2} (31.507 sq mi)

Population (2019)
- On reserve: 523
- On other land: 1
- Off reserve: 861
- Total population: 1385

Government
- Chief: Rupert Meneen

Tribal Council
- North Peace Tribal Council

Website
- labelprodigy.com

The Tallcree First Nation, also called the Tallcree Tribal Government, is a First Nations band government in Northern Alberta. It controls seven Indian reserves, the largest and most populated being Tallcree 173 (South Tallcree) and Tallcree 173A (North Tallcree).

In 1899, they signed Treaty 8. They are part of the North Peace Tribal Council.

== Identity ==
The band described as Woodland Cree and Cree and identifies as Anishinabe, with many members with roots in Montana. They trace their ancestors to those who followed Sitting Bull into Canada in the late 19th century.

== Economic development ==
The band owns and operates a gas station on Fort Vermilion 173B, an urban reserve adjacent to the community of Fort Vermilion.

== Notable people ==
- Notorious Cree, dancer and influencer
