= North Peace Tribal Council =

Tribal council in Alberta, Canada

The North Peace Tribal Council represents five First Nations in northwestern Alberta, Canada. The North Peace Tribal Council was incorporated in 1987, by the Beaver First Nation, Dene Tha' First Nation, Little Red River Cree First Nation, and Tallcree Tribal Government. The Lubicon Lake Nation was accepted into membership in 1995, but left in 2013.

== Members ==
Current Members

As of September 2018, North Peace Tribal Council had the following First Nations with these recorded number of registered members:

- Beaver First Nation: 1,126
- Dene Tha' First Nation: 3,148
- Little Red River Cree Nation: 5,868
- Tallcree Tribal Government: 1,376

Former Members

- Lubicon Lake Indian Nation: transferred to membership to Kee Tas Kee Now Tribal Council in 2013.
