= Wadlin Lake 173C =

Coordinates: 57°45′18″N 115°31′28″W

- Indian reserve
- Wadlin Lake Indian Reserve No. 173C
- Location in Alberta
- First Nation: Tallcree
- Treaty: 8
- Country: Canada
- Province: Alberta
- Specialized municipality: Mackenzie

Area
  - Total: 48 ha (120 acres)
- Time zone: UTC−06:00 (Alberta Time)

Wadlin Lake 173C is an Indian reserve of the Tallcree First Nation in Alberta, located within Mackenzie County. It is 91 kilometres east of Carcajou.
