= Boyer 164 =

Coordinates: 58°26′59″N 116°14′51″W

Boyer River 164
- Indian reserve
- Boyer River Indian Reserve No. 164
- Location in Alberta
- First Nation: Beaver
- Treaty: 8
- Country: Canada
- Province: Alberta
- Specialized municipality: Mackenzie

Area
  - Total: 4,249.3 ha (10,500 acres)

Population (2016)
  - Total: 218
  - Density: 5.13/km^{2} (13.3/sq mi)
- Time zone: UTC−06:00 (Alberta Time)

Boyer River 164 is an Indian reserve of the Beaver First Nation in Alberta, located within Mackenzie County. It is 16 kilometres northwest of Fort Vermilion. In the 2016 Canadian Census, it recorded a population of 218 living in 63 of its 67 total private dwellings.
