= Beaver Ranch 163 =

Coordinates: 58°26′06″N 115°44′24″W

- Indian reserve
- Beaver Ranch Indian Reserve No. 163
- Location in Alberta
- First Nation: Tallcree First Nation
- Country: Canada
- Province: Alberta
- Municipal district: Mackenzie

Area
  - Land: 9.22 km^{2} (3.56 sq mi)

Population (2016)
  - Total: 10
  - Density: 1.08/km^{2} (2.8/sq mi)
- Time zone: UTC−06:00 (Alberta Time)

Beaver Ranch 163 is an Indian reserve in Alberta. It is occupied by the Tallcree First Nation.
