= Alberta Highway 570 =

Highway in Alberta, Canada

Highway 570

Route information
- Maintained by Alberta Transportation
- Length: 184 km (114 mi)

Major junctions
- West end: Highway 10 in Drumheller
- Highway 36 near Sunnynook; Highway 41 near Acadia Valley
- East end: Saskatchewan border

Location
- Country: Canada
- Province: Alberta
- Specialized and rural municipalities: Special Area No. 2, Special Area No. 3
- Towns: Drumheller

Highway system
- Alberta Provincial Highway Network; List; Former
← Highway 569	→ Highway 573

Alberta Provincial Highway No. 570 is a highway in the province of Alberta, Canada. It runs east-west from Highway 10 within Town of Drumheller, 1.6 km (1.0 mi) east of the former hamlet of East Coulee, to the Saskatchewan border south Alsask, Saskatchewan. Highway 570 continues east in Saskatchewan as an unnumbered highway for 1.1 km (0.7 mi) before ending at Saskatchewan Highway 44.

Highway 570 is considered part of the shortest route between Calgary and Saskatoon, with some digital map platforms recommending using it along with Highway 564 and Highway 848 through Alberta, as opposed Highway 9 which is part of Canada's National Highway System. In spite a difference of approximately 25 km (15 mi) and bypassing the Drumheller townsite, the route is sparsely populated with no services.

== Major intersections ==
Rural/specialized municipality	Location	km	mi	Destinations	Notes
Town of Drumheller		0.0	0.0	Highway 10 (Hoo Doo Trail) to Highway 569 – Dalum, East Coulee, Town Centre	Highway 570 western terminus
Special Area No. 2	Dorothy	12.1	7.5	Highway 848 – Little Fish Lake Provincial Park	
Special Area No. 2		32.1– 32.6	19.9– 20.3	Highway 862 – Hanna, Finnegan Ferry	North and south intersections are offset; Highway 862 concurrency for 500 m (0.3 mi)
Special Area No. 2		48.3	30.0	Highway 36 – Hanna, Brooks	
Special Area No. 2		59.3	36.8	Range Road 144 – Sunnynook	
Special Area No. 2		67.4	41.9	Highway 876 south – Pollockville, Cessford	
Special Area No. 3	Big Stone	96.1	59.7	Highway 884 – Youngstown, Jenner	
Special Area No. 3		126.4	78.5	Highway 886 – Consort, Buffalo	
Special Area No. 3		147.4	91.6	Highway 895 north – Oyen	
Special Area No. 3		165.2	102.7	Highway 41 – Oyen, Acadia Valley, Medicine Hat	
Special Area No. 3		168.5	104.7	Highway 899 north – Sibbald	
↑ / ↓		184.3	114.5	Alberta – Saskatchewan border	Highway 570 eastern terminus
Chesterfield No. 261 (Saskatchewan)		185.4– 185.7	115.2– 115.4	Highway 44 – Alsask, Eatonia	
1.000 mi = 1.609 km; 1.000 km = 0.621 mi: Closed/former; Concurrency terminus
