= Rose Lynn, Alberta =

Hamlet in Alberta, Canada

Rose Lynn
- Hamlet
- Location of Rose Lynn in Special Area No. 2 Rose Lynn (Alberta)
- Coordinates: 51.418535°N 111.677266°W
- Country: Canada
- Province: Alberta
- Region: Southern Alberta
- Census division: No. 4
- Special Area: Special Area No. 2

Government
  - Type: Unincorporated
  - Governing body: Special Areas Board
- Elevation: 791 m (2,595 ft)
- Time zone: UTC−06:00 (Alberta Time)

Rose Lynn is a hamlet in Alberta, Canada, in Special Area No. 2.

== Toponymy ==
Rose Lynn derives its name from a post office that was established in the area in 1910. The post office itself was named after the abundance of wild rose bushes in the area.

The hamlet's name is also recorded with the spelling Roselynn by provincial and federal government sources. Newspaper sources referred to the settlement by the name Rose Lynn as early as 1912, and Roselynn as early as 1917.

== History ==
=== Establishment and development: 1900–1929 ===
Around the turn of the 20th century, the area that would become Rose Lynn was populated by a handful of farms.

A post office was established in the area by the name Rose Lynn in February 1910 by postmaster Albert Strong. Albert's wife, Martha, selected the name because the area was profuse with wild roses, and Martha used the word 'lynn' to refer to meadows. In 1915, after this office's name changed to Forcina in July, a new Rose Lynn location opened in November. The Forcina post office closed in 1928, while the second Rose Lynn post office persisted until 1965.

Private Herbert Peterson, the son of Swedish immigrants and resident of Rose Lynn during his childhood, was killed in action during a June 1917 raid by the 49th Battalion during the First World War. Peterson's remains would not be recovered and identified until March 2007, nearly 90 years after his death. A month later, Peterson was interred at La Chaudière Military Cemetery, Vimy.

The Canadian National Railway (CN) purchased land to introduce a railway line connecting Hanna to Wardlow, and established a track near Rose Lynn in 1919. The post office subsequently relocated inside the train station, and a general store opened in 1920 to provide the settlement with groceries and hardware.

Following the introduction of the train line, Rose Lynn expanded quickly throughout the rest of the 1920s. By the end of the decade, the settlement became host to a school, blacksmith, restaurant, community hall, and cosmetics store. Two grain elevators also opened in Rose Lynn: one owned by the Alberta Wheat Pool and the other by Alberta Pacific Grain. The township held a rodeo and sports day, the Rose Lynn Stampede, in 1924 and 1925, affiliated with the Calgary Stampede.

=== Decline: 1930–1969 ===
In the 1930s, Rose Lynn, like much of the Alberta Special Areas, experienced financial hardship due to the Great Depression and drought wrought by the Dust Bowl. Settlements along the Hanna–Wardlow line began to depopulate as farms failed and families relocated in search of better economic conditions. By 1932, the Rose Lynn district government was low enough on funds that it wrote to Perren Baker, Minister of Education, imploring the provincial government to assume responsibility for administering schools in the area. Rose Lynn was moved under the governance of the Special Areas Board in 1938.

In March 1943 Rose Lynn was the site of the worst crash by personnel of the No. 34 Service Flying Training School, which opened as part of the British Commonwealth Air Training Plan during World War II. Four pilots and one passenger departed from Medicine Hat on a cross-country navigational exercise that took them at a low altitude over Rose Lynn. The plane struck a building, damaging the nearby grain elevators; three of the men aboard died in a post-impact fire, and two more died after being rushed to a hospital in Hanna by a CN train.

Rose Lynn's agricultural economy continued to diminish throughout the 1940s and into the 1950s. Alberta Pacific sold its elevator to the Alberta Wheat Pool in the 1940s; the elevator was torn down by the end of the decade. A Rose Lynn chapter of the Alberta Farmers' Union was established in 1943, amalgamating with the United Farmers of Alberta in 1949. Rose Lynn's last remaining grain elevator burned down after being struck by lightning in July 1956.

=== Dissolution and later use of site: 1970-present ===
By the 1970s Rose Lynn as a settlement had effectively ceased to exist, with only a small number of disconnected farms remaining in the area. Train services to the area ended that decade. Reporting on a reunion held in 1981 for Rose Lynn's quondam residents, Calgary Herald columnist Bob Shiels wrote that the event "was noteworthy because Rose Lynn isn't there any more."

As of 2017 some abandoned structures from the original settlement, such as its schoolhouse, remain standing. Some agricultural entities operate in the area as of 2025.

== See also ==
- List of hamlets in Alberta
