= List of hamlets in Alberta =

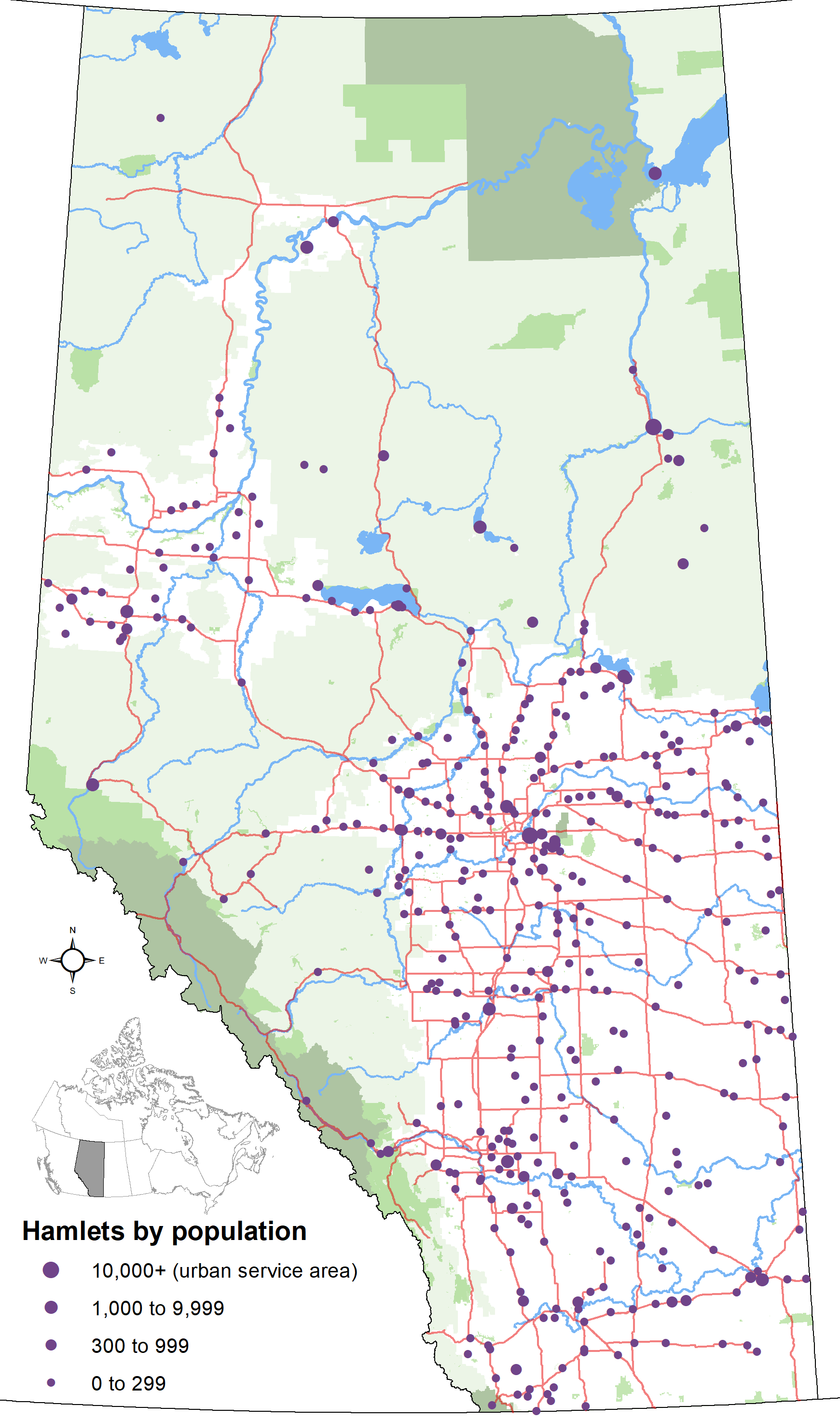
Distribution of Alberta's 403 hamlets as of 2023 by latest population available

Hamlets in the Canadian province of Alberta are unincorporated communities administered by, and within the boundaries of, specialized municipalities or rural municipalities (municipal districts, improvement districts and special areas). They consist of five or more dwellings (a majority of which are on parcels of land that are smaller than 1,850 m^{2}), have a generally accepted boundary and name, and contain parcels of land used for non-residential purposes.

Section 59 of the Municipal Government Act (MGA) enables specialized municipalities and municipal districts to designate a hamlet, while Section 590 of the MGA enables the Minister of Alberta Municipal Affairs to designate a hamlet within an improvement district. The Minister may also designate a hamlet within a special area pursuant to Section 10 of the Special Areas Act.

A hamlet can be incorporated as a village when its population reaches 300. However, Alberta has not had a hamlet incorporate as a village since January 1, 1980, when both Barnwell and Wabamun incorporated as villages. Since then, it has been more common for urban municipalities to dissolve from their current municipal status to that of a hamlet under the jurisdiction of its surrounding specialized or rural municipality. As such, the number of hamlets in Alberta has steadily grown over the years.

As of 2026, Alberta has 436 hamlets recognized by Alberta Municipal Affairs, which is up from 433 in 2024.

Alberta's two largest hamlets – Sherwood Park within Strathcona County and Fort McMurray (formerly a city) within the Regional Municipality of Wood Buffalo – have been further designated as urban service areas by Municipal Affairs. If they were to incorporate as cities, Sherwood Park and Fort McMurray would rank sixth and seventh respectively among Alberta's largest cities by population. Lac La Biche (formerly a town) within Lac La Biche County is a third hamlet also designated as an urban service area.

== List of hamlets ==
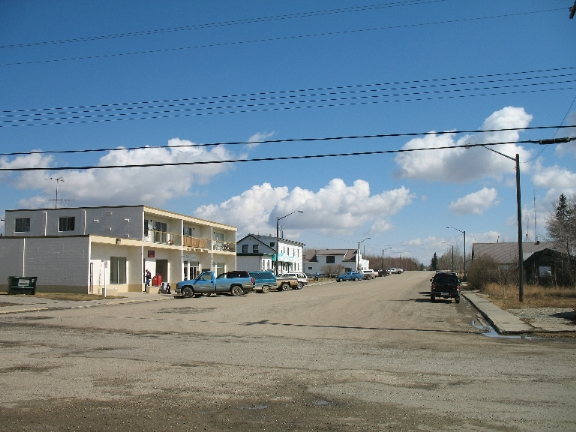
Entwistle

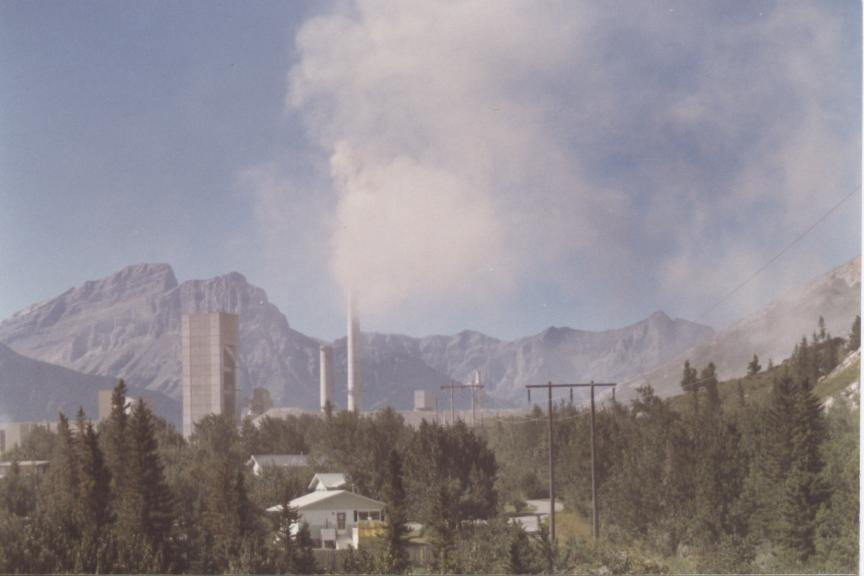
Exshaw townsite with plant

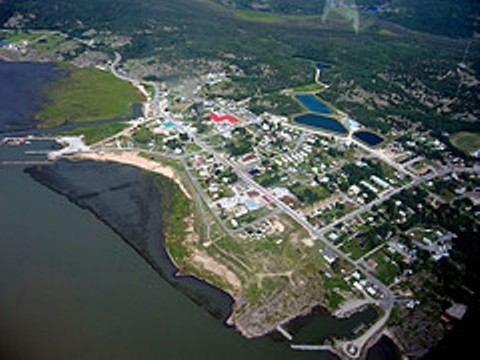
Fort Chipewyan

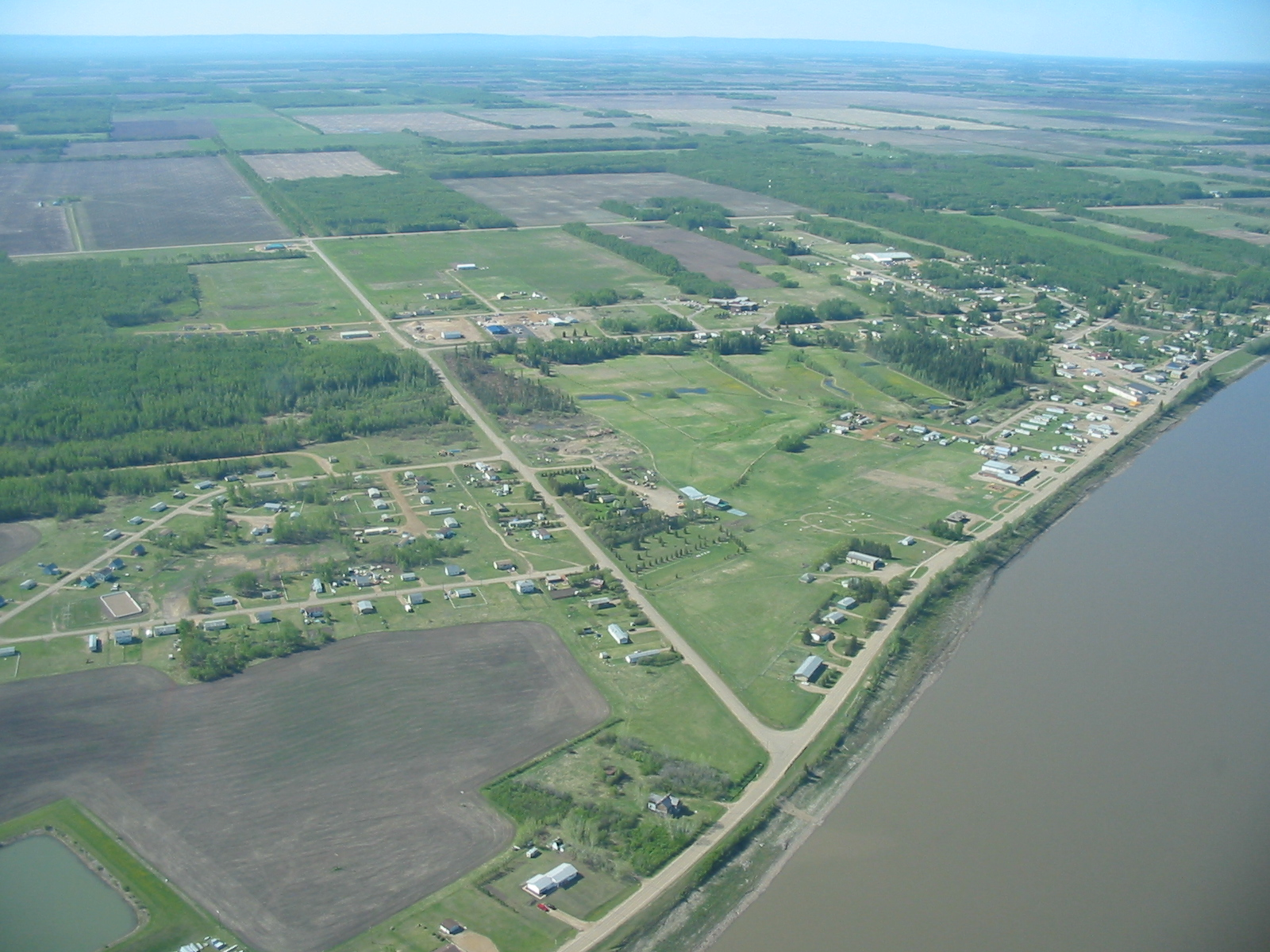
Fort Vermilion

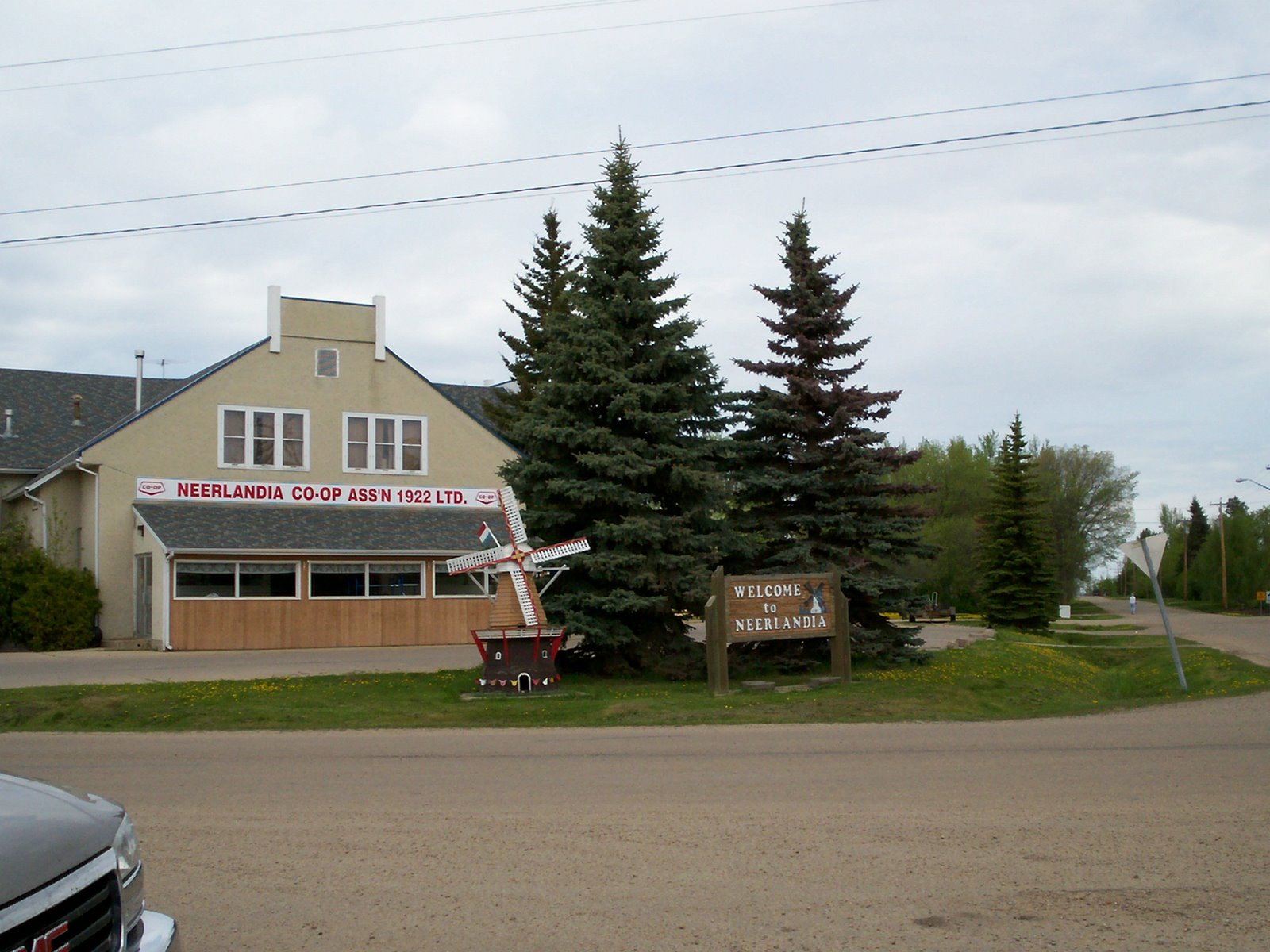
Neerlandia

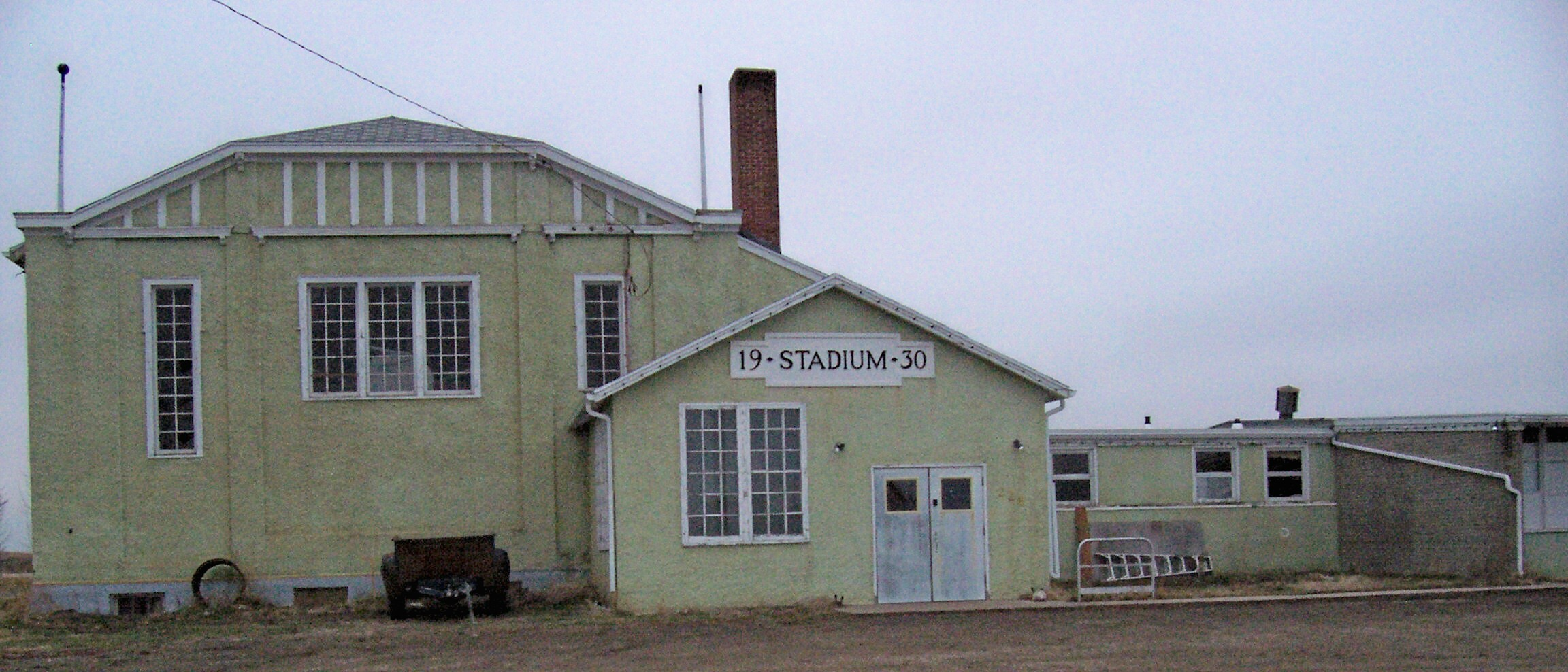
New Dayton

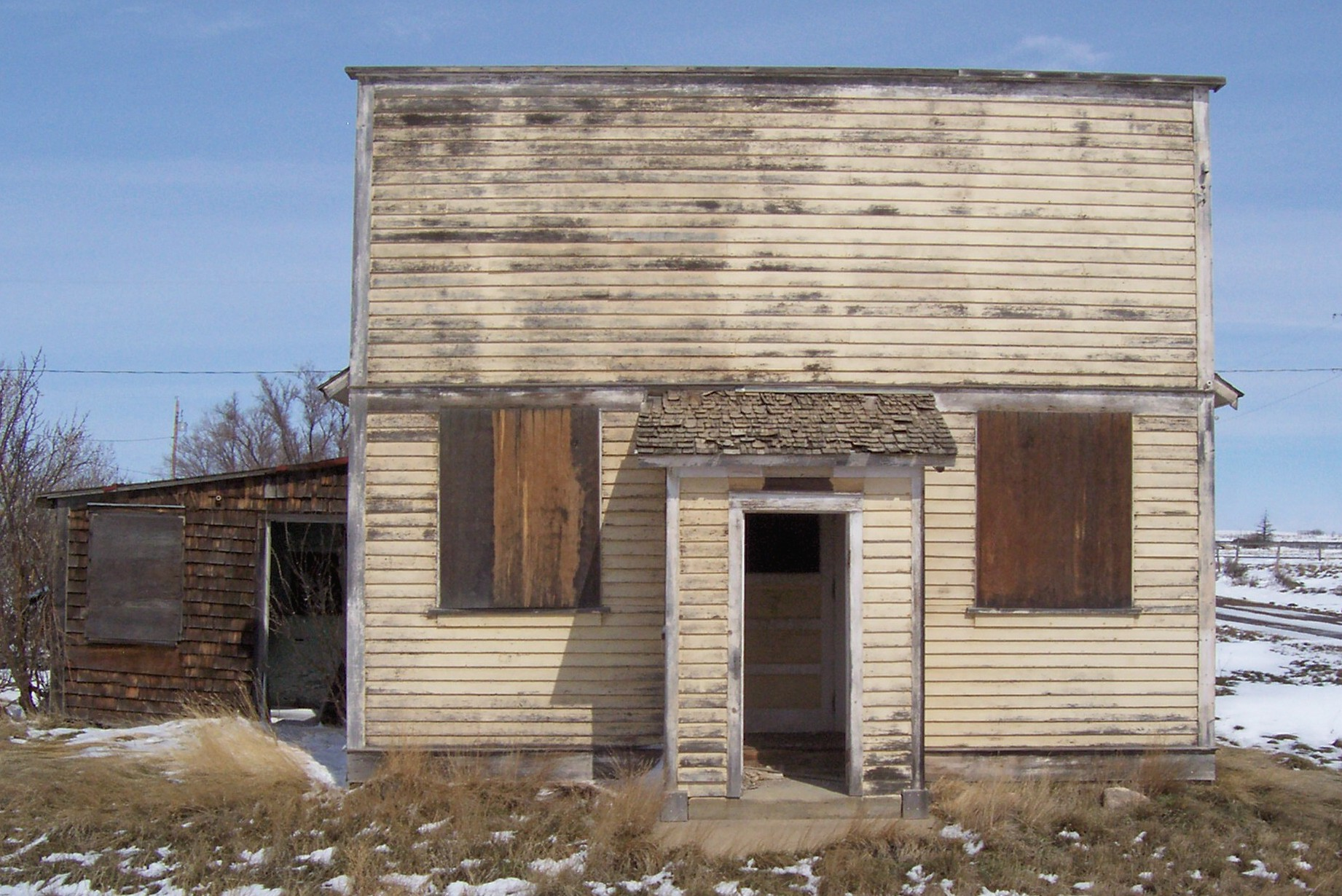
Orion

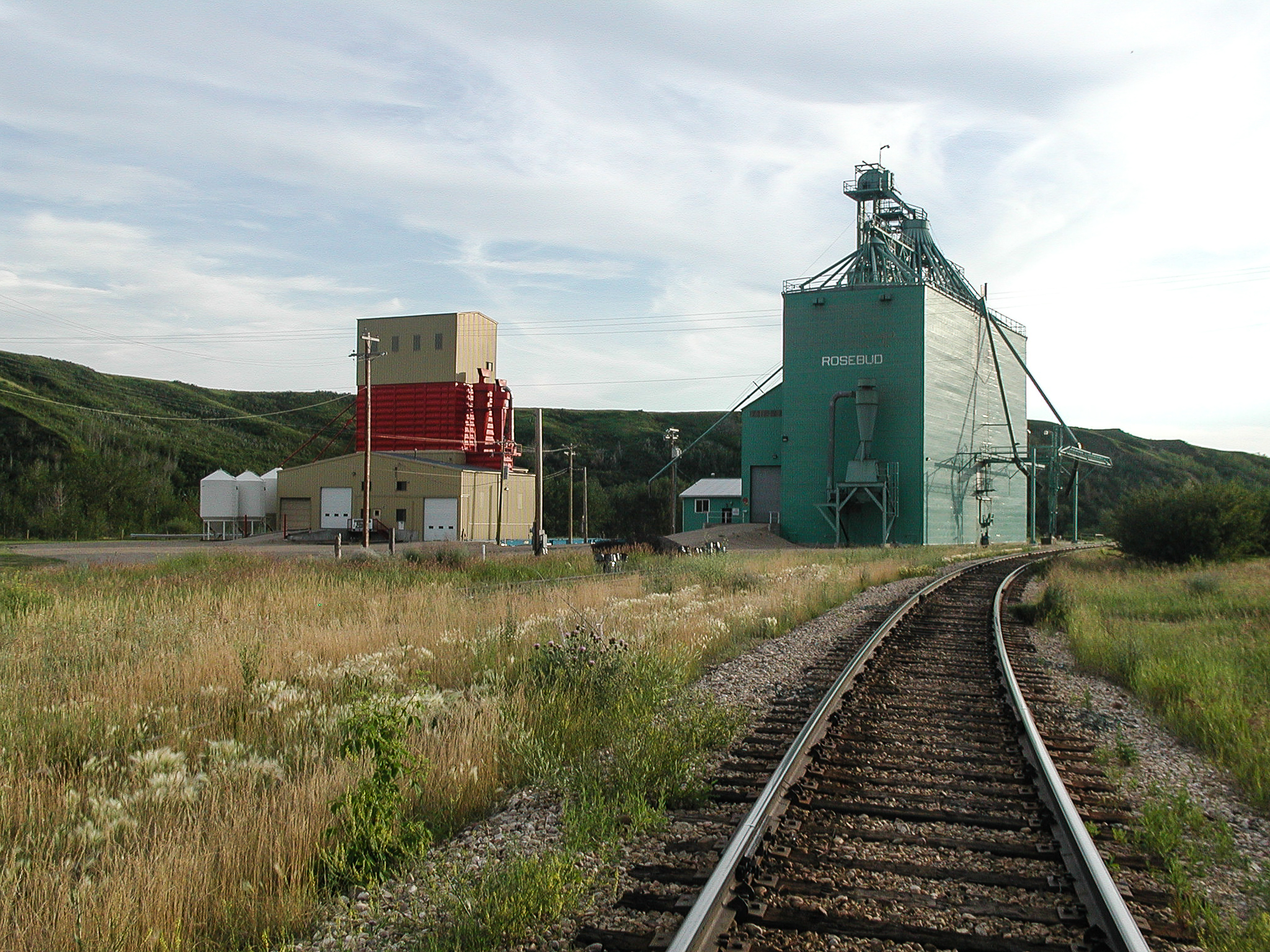
Rosebud

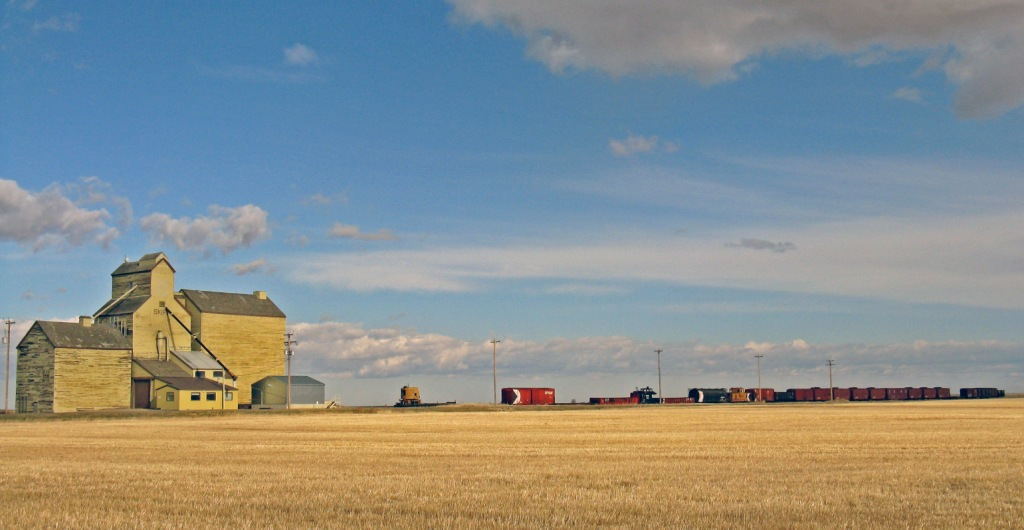
Skiff

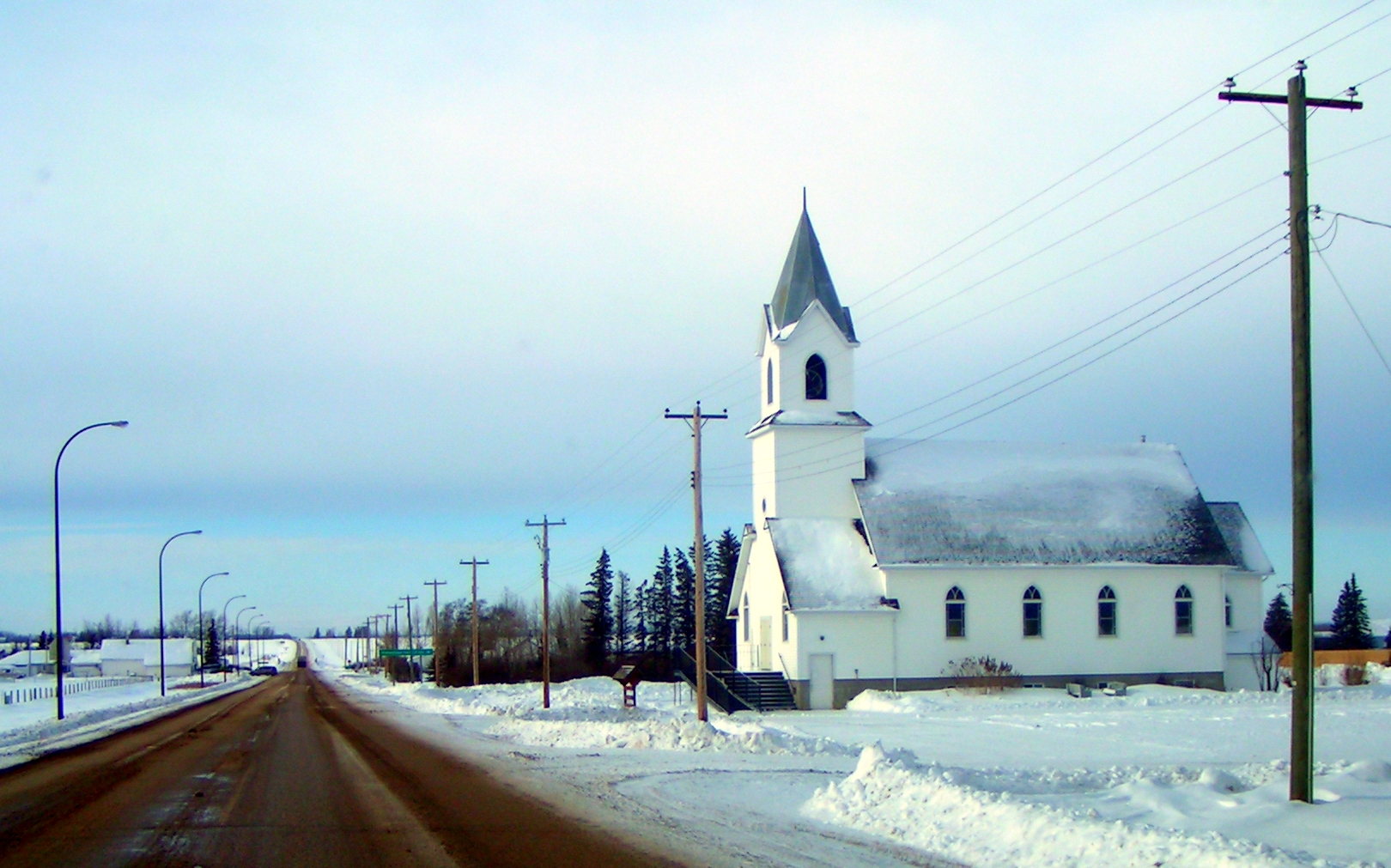
Valhalla Centre

List of hamlets in Alberta
Name	Specialized or rural municipality	Latest population	Census year
Abee	Thorhild County	27	2009
Acadia Valley	Acadia No. 34, MD of	143	2021
Aetna	Cardston County	109	2021
Alcomdale	Sturgeon County	65	2021
Alder Flats	Wetaskiwin No. 10, County of	137	2021
Aldersyde	Foothills County	64	2003
Alhambra	Clearwater County	64	1991
Altario	Special Area No. 4	26	1991
Antler Lake	Strathcona County	439	2024
Anzac	Wood Buffalo, RM of	506	2021
Ardenode	Wheatland County	0	2016
Ardley	Red Deer County	17	1991
Ardmore	Bonnyville No. 87, MD of	317	2021
Ardrossan	Strathcona County	1,238	2024
Armena	Camrose County	37	2021
Ashmont	St. Paul No. 19, County of	125	2021
Atmore	Athabasca County	10	2021
Balzac	Rocky View County	1	2006
Beauvallon	Two Hills No. 21, County of	7	1991
Beaver Crossing	Bonnyville No. 87, MD of	18	1991
Beaver Lake	Lac La Biche County	467	2021
Beaver Mines	Pincher Creek No. 9, MD of	85	2021
Beaverdam	Bonnyville No. 87, MD of	18	2014
Beazer	Cardston County	11	2008
Bellis (Note: Bellis dissolved from village status on December 31, 1945.)	Smoky Lake County	60	2021
Benalto	Red Deer County	198	2021
Benchlands	Bighorn No. 8, MD of	59	2021
Benton	Special Area No. 3		
Bezanson	Grande Prairie No. 1, County of	146	2024
Bindloss	Special Area No. 2	14	1991
Bircham	Kneehill County	5	2021
Blackfoot	Vermilion River, County of	386	2021
Blackie (Note: Blackie dissolved from village status on August 31, 1997.)	Foothills County	360	2021
Blue Ridge	Woodlands County	211	2021
Bluesky	Fairview No. 136, MD of	113	2021
Bluffton	Ponoka County	140	2021
Bodo	Provost No. 52, MD of	30	2021
Botha	Stettler No. 6, County of	180	2021
Bottrel	Rocky View County	5	2018
Bow City	Newell, County of	16	2020
Bragg Creek	Rocky View County	432	2021
Brant	Vulcan County	78	2007
Breynat	Athabasca County	22	1991
Brosseau	Two Hills No. 21, County of	13	1981
Brownfield	Paintearth No. 18, County of	27	1991
Brownvale	Peace No. 135, MD of	114	2021
Bruce	Beaver County	65	2021
Brule	Yellowhead County	127	2021
Buck Creek	Brazeau County	107	2005
Buck Lake	Wetaskiwin No. 10, County of	60	2021
Buffalo	Special Area No. 2		
Buffalo Lakes	Grande Prairie No. 1, County of	5	2024
Buford	Leduc County	33	2021
Burdett (Note: Burdett dissolved from village status on January 1, 2003.)	Forty Mile No. 8, County of	331	2021
Busby	Westlock County	135	2021
Byemoor	Stettler No. 6, County of	30	2021
Cadogan (Note: Cadogan dissolved from village status on December 31, 1945.)	Provost No. 52, MD of	108	2021
Cadomin	Yellowhead County	54	2021
Cadotte Lake	Northern Sunrise County	23	2021
Calahoo	Sturgeon County	143	2021
Calling Lake	Opportunity No. 17, MD of	375	2021
Campsie	Barrhead No. 11, County of		
Canyon Creek	Lesser Slave River No. 124, MD of	318	2021
Carbondale	Sturgeon County	78	2021
Cardiff	Sturgeon County	1,033	2021
Caroline	Clearwater County	470	2021
Carolside	Special Area No. 2		
Carseland	Wheatland County	542	2021
Carvel	Parkland County	19	2009
Carway	Cardston County	2	2008
Caslan	Athabasca County	23	1991
Cassils	Newell, County of	22	2020
Cavendish	Special Area No. 2	26	1986
Cayley (Note: Cayley dissolved from village status on June 1, 1996.)	Foothills County	414	2021
Cereal	Special Area No. 3	111	2021
Cessford	Special Area No. 2	31	1991
Chancellor	Wheatland County	5	2021
Cheadle	Wheatland County	83	2021
Cherhill	Lac Ste. Anne County	60	2008
Cherry Grove	Bonnyville No. 87, MD of	405	2014
Chin	Lethbridge County	83	2021
Chinook (Note: Chinook dissolved from village status on April 1, 1977.)	Special Area No. 3	38	1991
Chisholm	Lesser Slave River No. 124, MD of	15	2021
Clairmont (Note: Clairmont dissolved from village status on December 31, 1945.)	Grande Prairie No. 1, County of	6,123	2024
Clandonald	Vermilion River, County of	117	2021
Cleardale	Clear Hills County	19	2008
Cluny (Note: Cluny dissolved from village status on September 15, 1995.)	Wheatland County	50	2021
Cochrane Lake	Rocky View County	767	2021
Colinton	Athabasca County	169	2021
Collingwood Cove	Strathcona County	371	2024
Compeer (Note: Compeer dissolved from village status on December 31, 1936.)	Special Area No. 4	21	1991
Condor	Clearwater County	99	1991
Conklin	Wood Buffalo, RM of	154	2021
Conrich	Rocky View County	15	2021
Craigmyle (Note: Craigmyle dissolved from village status on January 1, 1972.)	Starland County	79	2013
Cynthia (Note: Cynthia dissolved from town status on May 1, 1959.)	Brazeau County	50	2005
Dalemead	Rocky View County	25	2021
Dalroy	Rocky View County	39	2021
Dalum	Wheatland County		
Dapp	Westlock County	30	2021
Darwell	Lac Ste. Anne County	30	1981
De Winton	Foothills County	98	2003
Dead Man's Flats	Bighorn No. 8, MD of	377	2021
Deadwood	Northern Lights, County of	22	1991
DeBolt	Greenview No. 16, MD of	132	2021
Del Bonita	Cardston County	6	2008
Delacour	Rocky View County	5	2021
Demmitt	Grande Prairie No. 1, County of	0	2024
Derwent (Note: Derwent dissolved from village status on September 1, 2010.)	Two Hills No. 21, County of	96	2021
Desert Blume	Cypress County	835	2021
Dewberry	Vermilion River, County of	161	2021
Diamond City (Note: Diamond City dissolved from village status on June 30, 1937.)	Lethbridge County	204	2021
Dickson	Red Deer County	50	2021
Dimsdale	Grande Prairie No. 1, County of	29	2024
Dixonville	Northern Lights, County of	96	2021
Donatville	Athabasca County	0	2016
Dorothy	Special Area No. 2	14	1991
Duffield	Parkland County	60	2021
Duhamel	Camrose County	46	2021
Dunmore (Note: Dunmore dissolved from village status on February 4, 1919.)	Cypress County	1,088	2021
Duvernay	Two Hills No. 21, County of	26	1991
Eaglesham (Note: Eaglesham dissolved from village status on December 31, 1996.)	Birch Hills County	76	2021
Edwand	Smoky Lake County	2	1986
Egremont	Thorhild County	46	2021
Ellscott	Athabasca County	5	2021
Elmworth	Grande Prairie No. 1, County of	5	2024
Enchant (Note: Enchant dissolved from village status on January 30, 1945.)	Taber, MD of	306	2021
Endiang	Stettler No. 6, County of	15	2021
Enilda	Big Lakes County	145	2021
Ensign	Vulcan County	26	2007
Entwistle (Note: Entwistle dissolved from village status on December 31, 2000.)	Parkland County	429	2021
Erskine (Note: Erskine dissolved from village status on May 20, 1946.)	Stettler No. 6, County of	319	2021
Esther	Special Area No. 3		
Etzikom	Forty Mile No. 8, County of	54	1991
Evansburg (Note: Evansburg dissolved from village status on June 30, 1998.)	Yellowhead County	717	2021
Excel	Special Area No. 3		
Exshaw	Bighorn No. 8, MD of	449	2021
Fabyan	Wainwright No. 61, MD of	100	2007
Fairview	Lethbridge County	165	2021
Fallis	Parkland County	54	2009
Falun	Wetaskiwin No. 10, County of	25	1991
Faust	Big Lakes County	282	2021
Fawcett	Westlock County	60	2021
Federal	Paintearth No. 18, County of	19	1991
Ferintosh (Note: Ferintosh dissolved from village status on January 1, 2020.)	Camrose County	180	2021
Flatbush	Lesser Slave River No. 124, MD of	30	2021
Fleet	Paintearth No. 18, County of	28	1991
Fort Assiniboine (Note: For Assiniboine dissolved from village status on December 31, 1991.)	Woodlands County	158	2021
Fort Chipewyan	Wood Buffalo, RM of	798	2021
Fort Fitzgerald	Wood Buffalo, RM of	6	2021
Fort Kent	Bonnyville No. 87, MD of	254	2021
Fort McKay	Wood Buffalo, RM of	57 (Note: Fort McKay's population does not include portion of community on Indian reserve.)	2021
Fort McMurray (Note: Fort McMurray is one of two hamlets designated an urban service area.)	Wood Buffalo, RM of	68,002 (Note: Fort McMurray's population is that of its population centre as delineated by Statistics Canada.)	2021
Fort Vermilion	Mackenzie County	772	2024
Gadsby	Stettler No. 6, County of	36	2021
Gainford	Parkland County	118	2021
Galahad (Note: Galahad dissolved from village status on January 1, 2016.)	Flagstaff County	125	2021
Gasoline Alley	Red Deer County		
Gem	Newell, County of	29	2020
Gleichen (Note: Gleichen dissolved from town status on March 31, 1998.)	Wheatland County	314	2021
Glenevis	Lac Ste. Anne County	49	2008
Goodfare	Grande Prairie No. 1, County of	15	2024
Goose Lake (Note: Goose Lake is also known as Lone Pine.)	Woodlands County	11	unpublished
Grande Cache (Note: Grande Cache dissolved from town status on January 1, 2019.)	Greenview No. 16, MD of	3,276	2021
Granum	Willow Creek No. 26, MD of	557	2021
Grassland	Athabasca County	46	2021
Grassy Lake (Note: Grassy Lake dissolved from village status on July 1, 1996.)	Taber, MD of	856	2021
Green Court	Lac Ste. Anne County	51	2008
Greenshields	Wainwright No. 61, MD of	80	2007
Gregoire Lake Estates	Wood Buffalo, RM of	138	2021
Grouard (Note: Grouard, also known as Grouard Mission, dissolved from village status on January 18, 1944.)	Big Lakes County	166	2021
Grovedale	Greenview No. 16, MD of	138	unpublished
Gunn	Lac Ste. Anne County	26	2021
Guy	Smoky River No. 130, MD of	57	1991
Gwynne	Wetaskiwin No. 10, County of	93	2021
Hairy Hill (Note: Hairy Hill dissolved from village status on December 31, 1996.)	Two Hills No. 21, County of	30 (Note: Hairy Hill's population is from the 2001 federal census (Statistics Canada did not publish its population in the 2006, 2011 or 2016 federal censuses).)	2001
Halcourt	Grande Prairie No. 1, County of	5	2024
Half Moon Lake (Note: Half Moon Lake is also known as Half Moon Estates.)	Strathcona County	206	2024
Halkirk	Paintearth No. 18, County of	92	2021
Harmony	Rocky View County	757	2021
Hartell	Foothills County	13	1991
Harvie Heights	Bighorn No. 8, MD of	163	2021
Hastings Lake	Strathcona County	110	2024
Haynes	Lacombe County	15	2021
Hays	Taber, MD of	196	2021
Hayter	Provost No. 52, MD of	84	2021
Heinsburg	St. Paul No. 19, County of	60	1991
Hemaruka	Special Area No. 4		
Heritage Pointe	Foothills County	1,974 (Note: Heritage Pointe's population is that of its population centre as delineated by Statistics Canada.)	2021
Herronton	Vulcan County	10	2007
Hesketh	Kneehill County	10	2021
Hilda	Cypress County	40	2021
Hilliard	Lamont County	35	1991
Hoadley	Ponoka County	9	1991
Huallen	Grande Prairie No. 1, County of	10	2024
Huxley	Kneehill County	75	2021
Hylo	Lac La Biche County	33	2016
Hythe	Grande Prairie No. 1, County of	835	2024
Iddesleigh	Special Area No. 2	14	1991
Indus	Rocky View County	36	2021
Iron River	Bonnyville No. 87, MD of		
Iron Springs	Lethbridge County	84	2021
Irvine (Note: Irvine dissolved from town status on December 31, 1996.)	Cypress County	321	2021
Islay (Note: Islay dissolved from village status on March 2, 1944.)	Vermilion River, County of	177	2021
Janet	Rocky View County	1	2006
Janvier South (Note: Janvier South is also known as Janvier and Chard.)	Wood Buffalo, RM of	61	2021
Jarvie	Westlock County	103	2021
Jean Cote	Smoky River No. 130, MD of	65	1991
Jenner (Note: Jenner dissolved from village status on June 22, 1943.)	Special Area No. 2	35	1986
Joffre	Lacombe County	128	2021
Johnson's Addition	Taber, MD of	126	2021
Josephburg	Strathcona County	122	2024
Joussard	Big Lakes County	334	2021
Kathyrn	Rocky View County	21	2021
Kavanagh	Leduc County	39	2021
Keephills	Parkland County	57	2021
Kelsey	Camrose County	15	2021
Keoma	Rocky View County	95	2021
Kimball	Cardston County	26	2008
Kingman	Camrose County	78	2021
Kinsella	Beaver County	40	2009
Kinuso (Note: Kinuso dissolved from village status on September 1, 2009.)	Big Lakes County	150	2021
Kipp	Lethbridge County	12	1981
Kirkcaldy	Vulcan County	12	2007
Kirriemuir	Special Area No. 4	28	1991
La Corey	Bonnyville No. 87, MD of	59	2014
La Crete	Mackenzie County	4,010	2024
La Glace	Grande Prairie No. 1, County of	174	2024
Lac des Arcs	Bighorn No. 8, MD of	146	2021
Lac La Biche (Note: Lac La Biche dissolved from town status on August 1, 2007, as a result of its amalgamation with Lakeland County to form Lac La Biche County.)	Lac La Biche County	3,215	2021
Lafond	St. Paul No. 19, County of	35	1991
Lake Newell Resort	Newell, County of	457	2021
Lamoureux	Sturgeon County	60	2008
Landry Heights	Greenview No. 16, MD of	114	1991
Lanfine	Special Area No. 3		
Langdon (Note: Langdon dissolved from village status on December 31, 1945.)	Rocky View County	5,497	2021
Lavoy (Note: Lavoy dissolved from village status on April 30, 1999.)	Minburn No. 27, County of	108	2001
Leavitt	Cardston County	59	2008
Leedale	Ponoka County	11	1991
Leslieville	Clearwater County	134	2021
Lindbergh	St. Paul No. 19, County of	50	1991
Linn Valley	Red Deer County	218	2021
Little Buffalo	Northern Sunrise County	441	2021
Little Smoky	Greenview No. 16, MD of	28	1991
Lodgepole (Note: Lodgepole dissolved from new town status on March 1, 1970.)	Brazeau County	117	2021
Long Lake	Thorhild County	81	2021
Looma	Leduc County	33	2021
Lottie Lake	St. Paul No. 19, County of	94 (Note: Referred to as Lottie Lake Development by Statistics Canada in the 1991 census.)	1991
Lousana	Red Deer County	42	2021
Lowland Heights	Pincher Creek No. 9, MD of	43	2021
Loyalist	Special Area No. 4	8	1986
Lundbreck	Pincher Creek No. 9, MD of	289	2021
Lyalta	Wheatland County	480	2021
Lymburn	Grande Prairie No. 1, County of	5	2024
Madden	Rocky View County	10	2021
Mallaig	St. Paul No. 19, County of	210	2021
Manola	Barrhead No. 11, County of	29	1991
Manyberries	Forty Mile No. 8, County of	96	1991
Marie Reine	Northern Sunrise County	67	2010
Markerville	Red Deer County	38	2021
Marlboro	Yellowhead County	97	2021
Marten Beach	Lesser Slave River No. 124, MD of	38	1991
Maskwacis (formerly Hobbema)	Ponoka County	64	2021
McLaughlin	Vermilion River, County of	41	2015
Meanook	Athabasca County	35	2021
Mearns	Sturgeon County	10	2008
Meeting Creek	Camrose County	0	2021
Metiskow	Provost No. 52, MD of	65 (Note: Statistics Canada cautioned that Metiskow's population from the 1991 census may be an estimate.)	1991
Michichi	Starland County	34	2013
Millarville	Foothills County	58	2003
Minburn (Note: Minburn dissolved from village status on July 1, 2015.)	Minburn No. 27, County of	78	2021
Mirror (Note: Mirror dissolved from village status on January 1, 2004.)	Lacombe County	481	2021
Mitsue Lake Industrial	Lesser Slave River No. 124, MD of		
Monarch (Note: Monarch dissolved from village status on December 31, 1938.)	Lethbridge County	217	2021
Monitor (Note: Monitor dissolved from village status on December 31, 1945.)	Special Area No. 4	60	1991
Moon River Estates	Willow Creek No. 26, MD of	145	2021
Morecambe	Two Hills No. 21, County of	23	1981
Morningside	Lacombe County	85	2021
Mossleigh	Vulcan County	53	2007
Mountain View (Note: Mountain View dissolved from village status on September 9, 1915.)	Cardston County	87	2021
Mulhurst Bay (Note: Mulhurst Bay is also known as Mulhurst.)	Wetaskiwin No. 10, County of	447	2021
Musidora	Two Hills No. 21, County of	13	1991
Namaka	Wheatland County	72	2021
Namao	Sturgeon County	10	2010
Naphtha	Foothills County	27	1991
Neerlandia	Barrhead No. 11, County of	101	1991
Nestow	Westlock County	5	2021
Nevis	Stettler No. 6, County of	30	2021
New Brigden	Special Area No. 3	24	1991
New Dayton	Warner No. 5, County of	47	1991
New Norway (Note: New Norway dissolved from village status on November 1, 2012.)	Camrose County	307	2021
New Sarepta (Note: New Sarepta dissolved from village status on September 1, 2010.)	Leduc County	495	2021
Newbrook	Thorhild County	63	2021
Nightingale	Wheatland County	37	2021
Nisku	Leduc County	30	2005
Niton Junction	Yellowhead County	88	2021
Nordegg	Clearwater County	53	1986
North Cooking Lake	Strathcona County	53	2024
North Star	Northern Lights, County of	49	1991
Notikewin	Northern Lights, County of	17	1991
Ohaton (Note: Ohaton dissolved from village status on December 31, 1945.)	Camrose County	133	2021
Opal	Thorhild County	24	2009
Orion	Forty Mile No. 8, County of	11	1991
Orton	Willow Creek No. 26, MD of	180	2021
Parkland	Willow Creek No. 26, MD of	50	1991
Patricia	Newell, County of	78	2021
Peers	Yellowhead County	91	2021
Pelican Point	Camrose County	117	2021
Peoria	Birch Hills County	12	1986
Perryvale	Athabasca County	10	2021
Pibroch	Westlock County	35	2021
Pickardville	Westlock County	303	2021
Pincher Station	Pincher Creek No. 9, MD of	26	2021
Pine Sands	Sturgeon County	30	2008
Plamondon (Note: Plamondon dissolved from village status on May 1, 2002.)	Lac La Biche County	501	2021
Pollockville	Special Area No. 2	19	1981
Poplar Ridge	Brazeau County	604	2005
Priddis	Foothills County	79	2003
Priddis Greens	Foothills County	267	2003
Purple Springs	Taber, MD of	101	2021
Queenstown	Vulcan County	8	2007
Radway (Note: Radway dissolved from village status on December 31, 1996.)	Thorhild County	231	2021
Rainier	Newell, County of	22	2020
Ranfurly (Note: Ranfurly dissolved from village status on December 31, 1945.)	Minburn No. 27, County of	71	2021
Red Earth Creek	Opportunity No. 17, MD of	315	2021
Red Willow	Stettler No. 6, County of	63	2021
Redland	Wheatland County	20	2021
Reno	Northern Sunrise County	20	2021
Rich Valley	Lac Ste. Anne County	32	2008
Richdale (Note: Richdale dissolved from village status on June 2, 1931.)	Special Area No. 2	14	1991
Ridgevalley	Greenview No. 16, MD of	46	1991
Rivercourse	Vermilion River, County of	16	2015
Riverview	St. Paul No. 19, County of	49	1991
Rivière Qui Barre	Sturgeon County	91	2021
Robb	Yellowhead County	144	2021
Rochester	Athabasca County	72	2021
Rochfort Bridge	Lac Ste. Anne County	71	2008
Rocky Rapids	Brazeau County	317	2005
Rolling Hills	Newell, County of	273	2021
Rolly View	Leduc County	71	2021
Rosebud (Note: Rosebud dissolved from village status on December 31, 1945.)	Wheatland County	112	2021
Roselynn	Special Area No. 2		
Round Hill	Camrose County	125	2021
Rowley	Starland County	8	2013
Rumsey (Note: Rumsey dissolved from village status on January 1, 1995.)	Starland County	64	2013
Sandy Lake (Note: Sandy Lake is also known as Pelican Mountain.)	Opportunity No. 17, MD of	163	2021
Sangudo (Note: Sangudo dissolved from village status on September 16, 2007.)	Lac Ste. Anne County	298	2021
Saprae Creek	Wood Buffalo, RM of	658	2021
Scandia	Newell, County of	169	2021
Scapa	Special Area No. 2		
Schuler	Cypress County	86	2021
Scotfield	Special Area No. 2		
Sedalia	Special Area No. 3	15	1991
Seven Persons	Cypress County	277	2021
Shaughnessy	Lethbridge County	388	2021
Sheerness	Special Area No. 2	25	1986
Sherwood Park (Note: Sherwood Park is one of two hamlets designated an urban service area.)	Strathcona County	75,575	2024
Shouldice	Vulcan County	7	2007
Sibbald	Special Area No. 3	33	1991
Skiff	Forty Mile No. 8, County of	10	1991
Smith	Lesser Slave River No. 124, MD of	227	2021
South Cooking Lake	Strathcona County	291	2024
Spedden	Smoky Lake County	56	1991
Spring Coulee	Cardston County	43	2008
Springbrook	Red Deer County	1,534	2021
Spruce View	Red Deer County	138	2021
St. Edouard	St. Paul No. 19, County of	33	1991
St. Francis	Leduc County	15	1991
St. Isidore	Northern Sunrise County	236	2021
St. Lina	St. Paul No. 19, County of	24	1991
St. Michael	Lamont County	39	1991
St. Vincent	St. Paul No. 19, County of	43	1991
Stanmore	Special Area No. 2		
Star	Lamont County	32	1991
Streamstown	Vermilion River, County of	20	2015
Strome (Note: Strome dissolved from village status on January 1, 2016.)	Flagstaff County	232	2021
Suffield (Note: Suffield dissolved from village status on January 1, 1930.)	Cypress County	190	2021
Sunnybrook	Leduc County	50	2021
Sunnynook	Special Area No. 2	13	1991
Sunnyslope	Kneehill County	28	2021
Swalwell (Note: Swalwell dissolved from village status on December 31, 1945.)	Kneehill County	93	2021
Tangent	Birch Hills County	39	1991
Tawatinaw	Westlock County	15	2021
Teepee Creek	Grande Prairie No. 1, County of	20	2024
Tees	Lacombe County	73	2021
Telfordville	Leduc County	35	2021
Therien	Bonnyville No. 87, MD of	71	2014
Thorhild (Note: Thorhild dissolved from village status on March 18, 2009.)	Thorhild County	391	2021
Throne	Paintearth No. 18, County of		
Thunder Lake	Barrhead No. 11, County of	34	1991
Tilley (Note: Tilley dissolved from village status on August 31, 2013.)	Newell, County of	318	2021
Tillicum Beach	Camrose County	130	2021
Tomahawk	Parkland County	113	2021
Torrington (Note: Torrington dissolved from village status on January 1, 1998.)	Kneehill County	239	2021
Travers	Vulcan County	0	2007
Tulliby Lake	Vermilion River, County of	22	2015
Turin	Lethbridge County	72	2021
Twin Butte	Pincher Creek No. 9, MD of	10	2021
Valhalla Centre	Grande Prairie No. 1, County of	38	2024
Veinerville	Cypress County	70	2021
Venice	Lac La Biche County	22	2016
Village at Pigeon Lake	Wetaskiwin No. 10, County of	77	2006
Villeneuve	Sturgeon County	260	2021
Vimy	Westlock County	183	2021
Violet Grove	Brazeau County	141	2005
Wabamun	Parkland County	644	2021
Wabasca (Note: Wabasca was formerly named Wabasca-Desmarais.)	Opportunity No. 17, MD of	1,594	2021
Wagner	Lesser Slave River No. 124, MD of	171 (Note: Statistics Canada cautioned that Wagner's population from the 1991 census may be an estimate.)	1991
Walsh (Note: Walsh dissolved from village status on April 30, 1925.)	Cypress County	50	2021
Wandering River	Athabasca County	63	1991
Wanham (Note: Wanham dissolved from village status on December 31, 1999.)	Birch Hills County	141	2021
Wardlow	Special Area No. 2	28	1991
Warspite (Note: Warspite dissolved from village status on June 1, 2000.)	Smoky Lake County	70	2021
Watino	Birch Hills County	22	1991
Watts	Special Area No. 2		
Wedgewood	Grande Prairie No. 1, County of	736	2024
Welling	Cardston County	30	2008
Welling Station	Cardston County	18	2008
Westerose	Wetaskiwin No. 10, County of	63	1991
Whitelaw	Fairview No. 136, MD of	110	2021
Whitford	Lamont County	6	1981
Whitla	Forty Mile No. 8, County of		
Widewater	Lesser Slave River No. 124, MD of	405	2021
Wildwood (Note: Wildwood dissolved from village status on December 31, 1990.)	Yellowhead County	257	2021
Willingdon	Two Hills No. 21, County of	249	2021
Wimborne	Kneehill County	15	2021
Winfield	Wetaskiwin No. 10, County of	193	2021
Winnifred	Forty Mile No. 8, County of	52	1956
Withrow	Clearwater County	50	1991
Woking	Saddle Hills County	62	2021
Woodhouse	Willow Creek No. 26, MD of	15	1991
Woolford	Cardston County	13	1986
Worsley	Clear Hills County	28	2008
Wostok	Lamont County	15	1991
Wrentham	Warner No. 5, County of	58	1991
Zama City	Mackenzie County	52	2021

== Former hamlets ==
Numerous communities in Alberta have been previously recognized as hamlets by the Province of Alberta. The majority were absorbed by urban municipalities through annexation or amalgamation. The following are those hamlets that have had their hamlet designation removed.

Name	Former municipality	Subsequent municipality	Remarks
Bankview	MD of Badlands No. 7	Drumheller	Annexed in 1964
Cambria	MD of Badlands No. 7	Drumheller	Absorbed as a result of amalgamation January 1, 1998
College Heights	Lacombe County	Lacombe	Annexed January 1, 2000
East Coulee	MD of Badlands No. 7	Drumheller	Absorbed as a result of amalgamation January 1, 1998
Glenwood	Yellowhead County	Edson	Annexed January 1, 1984
Grande Prairie Trail	Yellowhead County	Edson	Annexed January 1, 1984
Grantville	Kneehill County	Three Hills	Annexed January 1, 1983
Hardieville	Lethbridge County	Lethbridge	Annexed January 1, 1978
Hillcrest	Improvement District No. 5	Municipality of Crowsnest Pass	Absorbed via amalgamation January 1, 1979
Lake Louise	Improvement District No. 9	Improvement District No. 9	Held hamlet designation in 2024 but not in 2025
Lehigh	MD of Badlands No. 7	Drumheller	Absorbed as a result of amalgamation January 1, 1998
MacKay	Yellowhead County	Yellowhead County	Hamlet status was repealed by Yellowhead County in 2019 after being designated one in 1979
Midlandvale	MD of Badlands No. 7	Drumheller	Annexed in 1972
Midnapore	MD of Foothills No. 31	Calgary	Annexed in 1961
Nacmine	MD of Badlands No. 7	Drumheller	Absorbed as a result of amalgamation January 1, 1998
Newcastle	MD of Badlands No. 7	Drumheller	Annexed in 1967
North Drumheller	MD of Badlands No. 7	Drumheller	Annexed in 1967
Pinedale	Yellowhead County	Yellowhead County	Hamlet status was repealed by Yellowhead County in 2019 after being designated one in 1987
Ribstone	MD of Wainwright No. 61	MD of Wainwright No. 61	Hamlet status was repealed on January 21, 2024
Rosedale	MD of Badlands No. 7	Drumheller	Absorbed as a result of amalgamation January 1, 1998
Ruarkville	Kneehill County	Three Hills	Annexed December 31, 1984
Shepard	Rocky View County	Calgary	Annexed July 31, 2007
Waterton Park	Improvement District No. 4	Improvement District No. 4	Held hamlet designation in 2024 but not in 2025
Wayne	MD of Badlands No. 7	Drumheller	Absorbed as a result of amalgamation January 1, 1998
Western Monarch (Atlas)	Wheatland County	MD of Badlands No. 7	Now within the Town of Drumheller following the amalgamation of the City of Drumheller and the MD of Badlands No. 7 on January 1, 1998

== See also ==
- List of census divisions of Alberta
- List of cities in Alberta
- List of communities in Alberta
- List of designated places in Alberta
- List of former urban municipalities in Alberta
- List of ghost towns in Alberta
- List of Indian reserves in Alberta
- List of localities in Alberta
- List of municipal districts in Alberta
- List of municipalities in Alberta
- List of population centres in Alberta
- List of settlements in Alberta
- List of specialized municipalities in Alberta
- List of summer villages in Alberta
- List of towns in Alberta
- List of villages in Alberta
