= Buffalo, Alberta =

Buffalo
- Hamlet
- Location of Buffalo in Alberta
- Coordinates: 50.8100°N 110.6814°W
- Country: Canada
- Province: Alberta
- Census division: No. 4
- Special Area: No. 2

Government
  - Type: Unincorporated
  - Governing body: Special Areas Board
- Elevation: 720 m (2,360 ft)
- Time zone: UTC−06:00 (Alberta Time)

Buffalo is a hamlet and ghost town in Alberta, Canada, under the jurisdiction of the Special Areas Board. It is on Highway 555, between Bindloss and Jenner, south of the Red Deer River.

== Toponymy ==
Buffalo was named by homesteader James Paulding after his home city of Buffalo, New York.

== Topography ==
Buffalo falls within Alberta's Dry Mixedgrass Natural Subregion, characterized by grasses including needle-and-thread and prairie Junegrass. The moderately undulating terrain is composed of modestly well-drained chernozem soils, though limited water and soil nutrients restrict the production of forage crops.

=== Ecology ===
Buffalo is home to populations of coyotes and pronghorn antelope. The wild prairie rose grows in the area, alongside the western snowberry, death camas, Eastern pasqueflower, and fringed sagebrush.

== History ==
=== Founding and 20th century: 1890–2000 ===
Ranchers began to move to the Buffalo area in the late 1890s. Buffalo was officially founded in 1914 as a railway station along the Bassano Subdivision by the Canadian Pacific Railway. To give the station a name, the railway accepted the suggestion of a local homesteader to christen it after Buffalo, a city in the United States.

Buffalo expanded in the following years to host two grain elevators and commercial operations including a boarding house and community hall. The locality received a post office in February 1920.

In the 1930s, Buffalo and similar communities were afflicted by heavy droughts known as the Dust Bowl, leading to the creation of the Special Areas Board. The board introduced community pastures, including that of Buffalo-Atlee. Local ranchers from Buffalo and Atlee began to share an approximately 59,000-acre pasture.

Buffalo School opened in 1959 to serve grades one through nine. In 1963, Protestant congregants purchased an old schoolhouse and converted it into Buffalo United Church. The Buffalo & District Agricultural Society formed in 1973, and began hosting an annual rodeo and country fair the following year.

In 1993, Cypress School District deliberated whether to close Buffalo School after the school taught just 14 students that year at a cost of $150,000. After enrolment fell to nine in 1994, the school closed. In August that year, Buffalo was affected by a wildfire that burned over 6,500 ha of ranch and grassland in the area.

=== 21st century: 2001–present ===
By 2007, Buffalo was described by travel writer Liz Bryan as a "semi-ghost town". Its last remaining commercial outfits were its post office and general store, with social events provided for by the Buffalo & District Agricultural Society.

The Oyen Echo reported in 2014 that the original Buffalo town site was all but abandoned, but the Buffalo & District Agricultural Society continued, comprising 72 people living in the district. That year, Buffalo's annual fair coincided with the hamlet's centennial; over 200 present and former community members gathered to mark the occasion with a parade and rodeo.

On December 12, 2015, Buffalo United Church held its final service. Beginning in October 2016, the Canadian Food Inspection Agency temporarily quarantined the Buffalo-Atlee community pasture, after a cow that had originated in Alberta tested positive for bovine tuberculosis in the United States.

In 2025, the Special Areas Board entered into an agreement with the Buffalo-Atlee Grazing Co-operative to share responsibility for running the Buffalo-Atlee community pasture. The agreement will run initially as a three-year pilot.

== Services ==
=== Services ===
As of 2026, Buffalo is served by the Buffalo Post Office and General Store, the hamlet's only commercial operation. The Buffalo area hosts a volunteer fire department.

=== Recreation ===
The Buffalo Rodeo takes place annually in August. The Special Areas Board operates a campground near Buffalo.

== Climate ==
Buffalo averages 272 mm of annual precipitation.

== See also ==
- List of communities in Alberta
- List of ghost towns in Alberta
- List of hamlets in Alberta
