= Carolside, Alberta =

Hamlet in Alberta, Canada

Carolside
- Hamlet
- Location of Carolside in Special Area No. 2 Carolside (Alberta)
- Coordinates: 51.221612°N 111.628350°W
- Country: Canada
- Province: Alberta
- Region: Central Alberta
- Census division: No. 4
- Special Area: Special Area No. 2

Government
  - Type: Unincorporated
  - Governing body: Special Areas Board
- Time zone: UTC−06:00 (Alberta Time)
- Highways: Highway 570; Highway 876

Carolside is a hamlet and ghost town located in Special Area No. 2 in Alberta, Canada. Carolside was established in 1919 when the Canadian National Railway was constructed in the area. The hamlet was planned to have a grocery store, grain elevators, a trains station, a hardware store, a feed mill, and a manufacturing plant. By the 1950s, the new settlement was abandoned, having suffered serious blows caused by the Wall Street Crash of 1929 and the Great Depression. The railway line through the settlement was closed in the 1970s. There are no longer any buildings or structures left in Carolside, and that remains is the concrete foundation of the grain elevator and the faint remnants of the hamlets streets. In between Carolside and the hamlet of Sunnynook there is the Carolside Reservoir and Campground, named after the hamlet, which was the site of the discovery of Mosasaur remains in the 2010s. To commemorate this discovery, there is a sculpture of the Mosasaur at the reservoir.

== See also ==
- List of hamlets in Alberta
