= Scotfield =

- Hamlet
- Location of Scotfield in Special Area No. 2 Scotfield (Alberta)
- Coordinates: 51.5572°N 111.3392°W
- Country: Canada
- Province: Alberta
- Region: Southern Alberta
- Census division: No. 4
- Special Area: Special Area No. 2

Government
  - Type: Unincorporated
  - Governing body: Special Areas Board
- Time zone: UTC−06:00 (Alberta Time)

Scotfield is a hamlet in east-central Alberta, Canada that is under the jurisdiction of the Special Areas Board. Within Special Area No. 2, it is on Highway 9 between the Town of Hanna and the Village of Youngstown.

== See also ==
- List of hamlets in Alberta
