= Scapa, Alberta =

Hamlet in Alberta, Canada

Scapa
- Hamlet
- Etymology: Scapa Flow, Scotland
- Location of Scapa in Special Area No. 2 Scapa (Alberta)
- Coordinates: 51.872684°N 111.989499°W
- Country: Canada
- Province: Alberta
- Region: Central Alberta
- Census division: No. 4
- Special Area: Special Area No. 2

Government
  - Type: Unincorporated
  - Governing body: Special Areas Board
- Elevation: 791 m (2,595 ft)
- Time zone: UTC−06:00 (Alberta Time)

Scapa is a hamlet located in Special Area No. 2 in Alberta, Canada. It had a population of 4 in 1975. The former Canadian National Railway line that travelled past the community was completed in 1934. In 2020 the community erected a memorial to the victims of a 1906 blizzard that hit Scapa. Scapa is home to St. Peter's Lutheran Church and at one point also had two grain elevators.

== History ==
The CNR railway reached its terminus of Scapa in 1925, which was surveyed into four lots and three grain elevator sites (only two were ever used). Scapa was named by J.B. Mackenzie, the first post office master, likely after Scapa Flow from his native Scotland. A hall was built in the hamlet and a school was opened in 1929, and other amenities were also constructed such as a store and a Lutheran church. St. Peter's Lutheran Church was originally built in 1911 in Wetaskiwin but was dismantled and moved to Craigmyle by train and then transported to Scapa by sleighs in the winter of 1920–1921 after the Wetaskiwin congregation disbanded. The school was closed in 1968, with children from the hamlet being bused to nearby Hanna. The store and post office were converted into private dwellings in the late seventies and the grain elevators in the hamlet were demolished in 1983. The church and the hall continue to operate to this day and Scapa celebrated a centennial in 2025.

== See also ==
- List of hamlets in Alberta
