= Sheerness (disambiguation) =

Sheerness is a town in England, United Kingdom. Sheerness may also refer to:

== Canada ==
- Sheerness, Alberta, an unincorporated community in Alberta
- Sheerness Generating Station, coal fired power plant in Alberta

== United Kingdom ==
- Sheerness Dockyard, a naval dockyard in Sheerness, England
- Sheerness East railway station, a railway station in Sheerness, England, operated from 1901 to 1950
- Sheerness Line, a railway line in England
- Sheerness-on-Sea railway station, a railway station in Sheerness, England, since 1883

== Other ==
- HMS Sheerness, various ships in the 17th, 18th, and 19th centuries
