= Watts, Alberta =

Hamlet in Alberta, Canada

Watts
- Hamlet
- Location of Watts in Special Area No. 2 Watts (Alberta)
- Coordinates: 51.662912°N 112.092281°W
- Country: Canada
- Province: Alberta
- Region: Central Alberta
- Census division: No. 4
- Special Area: Special Area No. 2

Government
  - Type: Unincorporated
  - Governing body: Special Areas Board
- Elevation: 791 m (2,595 ft)
- Time zone: UTC−06:00 (Alberta Time)

Watts is a hamlet located in Special Area No. 2 in Alberta, Canada.

== See also ==
- List of hamlets in Alberta
