= Sheerness, Alberta =

Hamlet in Alberta, Canada

Coordinates: 51°29′21″N 111°40′44″W

Location of Sheerness Alberta

Sheerness is a hamlet in southern Alberta, Canada that is under the jurisdiction of the Special Areas Board. Within Special Area No. 2, it is 7 kilometres (4.3 mi) east of Highway 36 and 102 kilometres (63 mi) north of Brooks.

== Toponymy ==
Sheerness was named after a port town of the same name in Kent, England. The name was selected by English settler George Crozier, whose wife served as the first postmaster of Alberta's Sheerness.

== History ==
=== Founding, railway and coal mining: 1905–1960 ===
Around the year 1905, the area that today contains Sheerness was used for grazing by cattle ranchers. One local history provides that a rancher searching for a potential well site struck coal while digging, which subsequently attracted mining operations to the area.

The settlement developed quickly enough that a Sheerness post office began operating in May 1910, and Sheerness School opened in 1913. A hardware store, pool hall, and boarding house were operating in the townsite by 1914. Prior to the introduction of the railroad, coal was transported from Sheerness by horses and wagons.

The Canadian National Railway built a railway line through the settlement in 1919, facilitating its growth. A community hall was established in the 1920s to host social events for locals, including dances and concerts, and the Alberta Pacific Company began operating a Sheerness grain elevator in 1923. During the late 1920s, Sheerness held a yearly stampede.

Between 1943 and 1967 Sheerness' coal mines employed around 50 miners, producing up to 270,000 tons of coal a year. At its peak in the early 1950s, Sheerness contained around 150 residents. The Sheerness mine's largest contract was to supply the Saskatoon Power Plant with fuel. In 1948, the grain elevator was purchased by the Alberta Wheat Pool.

=== Decline and later energy-based economy: 1961–present ===
In 1961, Sheerness' grain elevator closed down; it was dismantled two years later. Sheerness School closed in 1963, as a number of local schools were consolidated in Hanna. When the Saskatoon Power Plant switched to natural gas fuel in 1969, Sheerness' coal operations declined, and much of its permanent population relocated to Hanna. Other families moved due to the introduction of better highways in the area, which allowed them to commute. Its post office closed in April 1970.

Until 1975, Sheerness' mine opened only during the winter months to supply the local domestic market. By 1976, however, demand for coal had increased enough that moderate operations restarted in the hamlet. Nonetheless, Sheerness contained approximately four permanent families by this time. Its now-disused community centre was dismantled in 1978. As of 2025, nothing of the original Sheerness townsite remains.

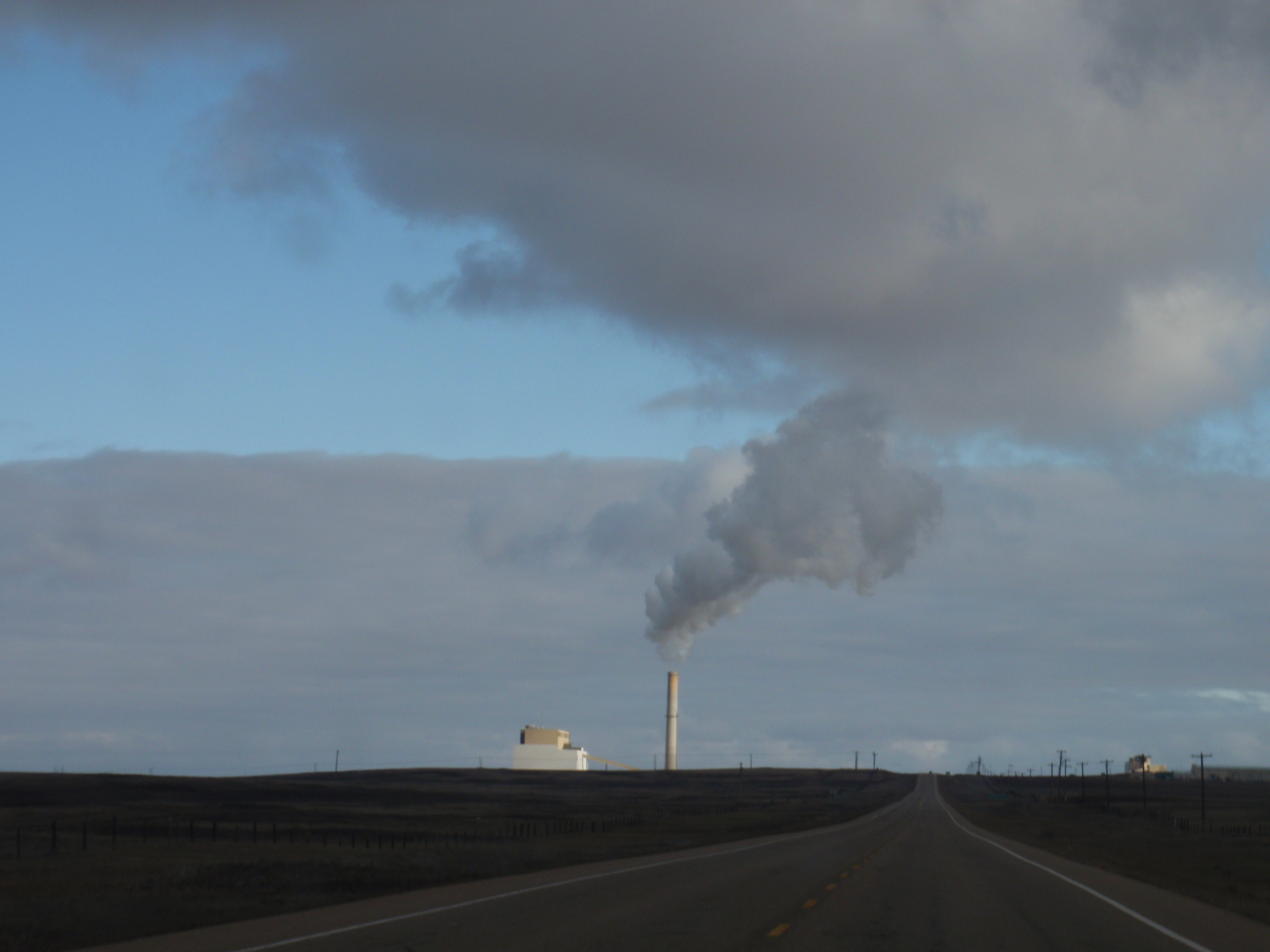
Sheerness Generating Station, photographed in 2010 while still operating with coal fuel.

Sheerness itself became the site of a power plant in 1986: Sheerness Generating Station. The Sheerness mine provided the plant with coal until 2021, when the station converted to natural gas.

Sheerness Coal Mine began winding down operations in 2015 as part of the Government of Alberta's climate change strategy. At this time, the mine employed 200 workers, primarily from the nearby town of Hanna. The announcement of the mine's impending closure was observed to have a negative effect on the mental health of workers, and also preceded a spike in domestic violence cases reported to the RCMP. The mine closed in 2021.

== Economy ==
In 2021 Sheerness Coal Mine was repurposed into a soil amendment operation, selling naturally-occurring humalite found in the mine to agricultural buyers. Also in 2024, construction began on Sheerness Industrial Park and Reservoir. The project, completed in early 2025, created industrial lots across 320 acres of land, supported by a dedicated water reservoir.

In December 2025 the Sheerness Generating Station announced that it would temporarily deactivate one generator beginning in April 2026, for a period of up to two years.

== Amenities ==
Sheerness Cooling Pond, a reservoir measuring two miles by two miles (3.2 by 3.2 kilometers) that cools the Sheerness Generating Station, is part of Prairie Oasis Park. Visitors can bathe, participate in water-based sports, walk dogs, or access beaches on the pond's shores.

== Demographics ==
Nothing of the 20th century Sheerness townsite remains as of 2025, but the area contains several properties and agricultural operations.

== See also ==
- List of hamlets in Alberta
