= Hemaruka, Alberta =

Hemaruka
- Hamlet
- Location of Hemaruka in Special Area No. 4 Hemaruka (Alberta)
- Coordinates: 51.78342°N 111.10172°W
- Country: Canada
- Province: Alberta
- Region: Central Alberta
- Census division: No. 4
- Special Area: Special Area No. 4

Government
  - Type: Unincorporated
  - Governing body: Special Areas Board
- Time zone: UTC−06:00 (Alberta Time)
- Highways: Highway 885

Hemaruka is a hamlet in Alberta, Canada that is under the jurisdiction of the Special Areas Board.

== Toponymy ==
The settlement was known as Zetland until 1927, when it became Hemaruka. Its original name derived from an eponymous settlement in Huron County, Ontario.

The name Hemaruka is a combination of the first two letters of the names Helen, Margaret, Ruth, and Kathleen (also recorded as Mary and Kate). These were the names of the daughters of Albert Edward Warren, general manager of the Canadian National Railways (CNR) Central Region at the time.

== History ==
In 1912, a post office was established for the settlement by the name Zetland. In 1926, construction was completed of a CNR train line between Zetland, Alberta and Biggar, Saskatchewan. When the station was named Hemaruka after the daughters of Albert Warren, Zetland, and subsequently its post office, assumed the same name from April 1927 onwards. Also around this time, the Alberta Wheat Pool opened a grain elevator in the area, a school opened, and a community hall was built by 1929.

The CNR track was used for periodic grain exports and coal deliveries, but received no timetabled rail services until 1933, when an ongoing coal hauling operation was established. This service involved a train from Biggar to Hemaruka and back again once a week, on Fridays. No additional services were established due to the ongoing economic pressures of the Great Depression.

Hemaruka received national media attention in 1935 after Austrian-born resident, William Hawryluk, was prosecuted for the murder of his wife, Helen, in January of that year. Their ten-year-old son, a witness to the crime, testified against Hawryluk at trial. An autopsy also determined that Helen had died from head injuries "resulting from heavy blows," and William was sentenced to death by Justice Thomas Tweedie. After the federal government declined to intervene with the sentence, Hawryluk was executed at Fort Saskatchewan by hanging in August.

As the Depression era transitioned into the Second World War, train services to Hemaruka did not expand. An absence of transit connections damaged the locality's economy, and, by 1944, Hemaruka had a population of 17. Despite its modest size, three general stores remained operational in the settlement at this time. The hamlet was served by one nurse, who also acted as an unofficial undertaker for Ukrainian families in the district who conducted their own funerals.

Hemaruka's post office closed in March 1966, and the school closed the next year. In 1969, the CNR sold the Hemaruka train station for one dollar to a local. Hemaruka's grain elevator ceased operations in 1975, and its train tracks were removed entirely in 1978.

As of 2024, Hemaruka contains some inhabited residential properties, while some abandoned buildings from its earlier operations remain standing. Its community hall remains in use for occasional events hosted by the Hemaruka Hall Association as of 2025. Around 40 people attended a New Year's Eve display at the hall in 2024.

== See also ==
- List of hamlets in Alberta
