= Cavendish, Alberta =

Cavendish
- Hamlet
- Location of Cavendish in Special Area No. 2 Cavendish (Alberta)
- Coordinates: 50.819403°N 110.450952°W
- Country: Canada
- Province: Alberta
- Region: Central Alberta
- Census division: No. 4
- Special Area: Special Area No. 2

Government
  - Type: Unincorporated
  - Governing body: Special Areas Board
- Elevation: 791 m (2,595 ft)
- Time zone: UTC−06:00 (Alberta Time)

Cavendish is a hamlet in Alberta, Canada that is under the jurisdiction of the Special Areas Board.

The hamlet is named after Victor Cavendish, 9th Duke of Devonshire, 11th Governor General of Canada.

A marsh in Cavendish was the location of Alberta's first record of a Common crane on December 11, 1957.

== See also ==
- List of hamlets in Alberta
