= Stanmore, Alberta =

Hamlet in Alberta, Canada

Stanmore
- Hamlet
- Location of Stanmore in Special Area No. 2 Stanmore (Alberta)
- Coordinates: 51.579862°N 111.512042°W
- Country: Canada
- Province: Alberta
- Region: Central Alberta
- Census division: No. 4
- Special Area: Special Area No. 2

Government
  - Type: Unincorporated
  - Governing body: Special Areas Board
- Time zone: UTC−06:00 (Alberta Time)
- Highways: Highway 9

Stanmore is a hamlet located in Special Area No. 2 in Alberta, Canada. It is directly adjacent to Alberta Highway 9, which takes the former route of the Canadian National Railway line that went through the community. The hamlet is believed to have been named after Stanmore, England. Stanmore was formerly a larger settlement then it currently is, at its peak being home to a school, grain elevators, and a post office which opened in 1913 and closed in 1970. There was also a municipal district named after the hamlet, Stanmore No. 454. Stanmore was the location of a minor breakout of the Bubonic plague in 1937 that led to the death of one mink farmer and the death of 22 minks, who had contracted the disease from dead prairie dogs. Natural gas discoveries around Stanmore since the 1950s have led to it becoming one of the largest driver of economic development in the area, along with agriculture and ranching.

== See also ==
- List of hamlets in Alberta
