= Esther, Alberta =

Community in Alberta, Canada

Esther
- Hamlet
- Location of Esther in Special Area No. 3 Esther (Alberta)
- Coordinates: 51.6825°N 110.2603°W
- Country: Canada
- Province: Alberta
- Region: Central Alberta
- Census division: No. 4
- Special Area: Special Area No. 3

Government
  - Type: Unincorporated
  - Governing body: Special Areas Board
- Time zone: UTC−06:00 (Alberta Time)
- Waterways: Sounding Creek

Esther is a hamlet in southern Alberta, Canada, that is under the jurisdiction of the Special Areas Board. Within Special Area No. 3, it is 16 kilometres (9.9 mi) east of Highway 41, 185 kilometres (115 mi) north of Medicine Hat. It was first settled in 1910. The community was named after Anna Esther Landreth, the daughter of the postmaster and first girl settler in the area.

== See also ==
- List of hamlets in Alberta
