= Richdale =

- Hamlet
- Location of Richdale Richdale (Canada)
- Coordinates: 51°36′37″N 111°36′15″W
- Country: Canada
- Province: Alberta
- Region: Southern Alberta
- Census division: 4
- Special area: Special Area No. 2

Government
  - Type: Unincorporated
  - Governing body: Special Areas Board

Population (1991)
  - Total: 14
- Time zone: UTC−06:00 (Alberta Time)
- Area codes: 403, 587, 825

Richdale is a hamlet in east-central Alberta, Canada within Special Area No. 2. It is located on Highway 9 approximately 24 kilometres (15 mi) east of the Town of Hanna, 29 kilometres (18 mi) west of the Village of Youngstown and 130 kilometres (81 mi) north of the City of Brooks. Previously an incorporated community, Richdale was incorporated as a village in 1916, it was dissolved from village status on June 2, 1931.

== Demographics ==
Richdale recorded a population of 14 in the 1991 Census of Population conducted by Statistics Canada.

== See also ==
- List of communities in Alberta
- List of former urban municipalities in Alberta
- List of hamlets in Alberta
