= Sedalia, Alberta =

Community in Alberta, Canada

Sedalia
- Hamlet
- Location of Sedalia Sedalia (Canada)
- Coordinates: 51°40′30″N 110°39′53″W
- Country: Canada
- Province: Alberta
- Region: Southern Alberta
- Census division: 4
- Special area: Special Area No. 3

Government
  - Type: Unincorporated
  - Governing body: Special Areas Board

Population (1991)
  - Total: 15
- Time zone: UTC−06:00 (Alberta Time)
- Area codes: 403, 587, 825

Sedalia is a hamlet in southern Alberta, Canada, within Special Area No. 3. It is located approximately 31 kilometres (19 mi) north of Highway 9 and 150 kilometres (93 mi) northeast of Brooks. The area was developed when the railway came through in 1925. The hamlet was named after Sedalia, Missouri, where some settlers of the area originated from.

A-200 megawatt solar farm is proposed for a parcel of land north of Sedalia.

== See also ==
- List of communities in Alberta
- List of hamlets in Alberta
