= New Brigden =

- Hamlet
- Location of New Brigden New Brigden (Canada)
- Coordinates: 51°42′02″N 110°29′24″W
- Country: Canada
- Province: Alberta
- Region: Southern Alberta
- Census division: 4
- Special area: Special Area No. 3

Government
  - Type: Unincorporated
  - Governing body: Special Areas Board

Population (1991)
  - Total: 24
- Time zone: UTC−06:00 (Alberta Time)
- Area codes: 403, 587, 825

New Brigden is a hamlet in southern Alberta, Canada within Special Area No. 3. It is located 1 kilometre (0.62 mi) east of Highway 41, approximately 185 kilometres (115 mi) north of Medicine Hat.

== Demographics ==
New Brigden recorded a population of 24 in the 1991 Census of Population conducted by Statistics Canada.

== See also ==
- List of communities in Alberta
- List of hamlets in Alberta
