= Wardlow, Alberta =

Wardlow
- Hamlet
- Location of Wardlow Wardlow (Canada)
- Coordinates: 50°54′19″N 111°32′46″W
- Country: Canada
- Province: Alberta
- Region: Southern Alberta
- Census division: 4
- Special area: Special Area No. 2

Government
  - Type: Unincorporated
  - Governing body: Special Areas Board

Population (1991)
  - Total: 28
- Time zone: UTC−06:00 (Alberta Time)
- Area codes: 403, 587, 825

Wardlow is a hamlet in southern Alberta, Canada within Special Area No. 2. It is located approximately 24 kilometres (15 mi) east of Highway 36 and 45 kilometres (28 mi) northeast of Brooks.

== Toponymy ==
There are two competing accounts of how Wardlow received its name. The first provides that Wardlow was named for a location in Scotland associated with Clan Cameron.

The second suggests Wardlow was named for a daughter of rancher James R. Sutherland, after the Canadian Northern Railway established a track through his property. Historian Harry Sanders notes that Sutherland was, in actuality, a Calgary-based federal employee working on an irrigation project in the area. Among Sutherland's children was daughter Catherine Wardlow Sutherland.

== Topography ==
Wardlow lies on generally flat terrain. Its soil is Solonetzic and subsequently poor for arable farming, though the area has traditionally housed grain operations. Low levels of precipitation in the area further pose a challenge for pastoral farming.

=== Flora and fauna ===
Wardlow is populated by Cooper's hawks, mule deer, loggerhead shrikes, curlews, and marbled godwits.

== History ==
=== Cravath Corners: 1910-1919 ===
Before the introduction of the railway, the area that would come to be known as Wardlow contained a few farms, of which four were run by the Cravath family. They established a post office and family cemetery by the name of Cravath Corners within a few years of their arrival in 1910. One of the four Cravath families vacated the area in 1919, followed by two others in 1926.

=== Wardlow and its growth: 1920-1970 ===
In the fall of 1920, the Canadian Northern Railway established a railway line through the agricultural lands, and named the railway station Wardlow. A larger community developed around the railway station, with the expectation that the line would eventually connect the community to Medicine Hat. (The line ultimately fell short of this aspiration, and instead terminated at Hanna.)

After the Cravath Corners post office closed permanently in August 1920, a Wardlow post office was established in January 1922. Wardlow was slow to develop nonetheless, and, in 1926, the train tracks connecting Wardlow to Steveville were removed. Services to Hanna continued.

To provide for local children, a schoolhouse was moved from a nearby settlement to Wardlow in the 1930s. Though the school was open by 1934, it was poorly equipped and in a state of disrepair, as teacher Phyllis Dove discovered when she accepted the post in September. She wrote to the provincial government to request that the building receive three panes of glass, two door handles, and general structural repairs. When the school closed in 1940, Wardlow had a permanent population of around 20 people.

Speculation that the area contained oil and gas renewed interest in Wardlow in the early 1950s. Drilling reached its peak by 1955, a year in which Wardlow's permanent population stood at around 40. In September, Wardlow's name was accepted for federal mapping purposes. Also in 1955, Wardlow School reopened; this time, it would remain in operation until June 1961.

In 1967, Wardlow reportedly had 11 settled residents.

=== Later development: 1971-present ===
Train services connecting Wardlow to Hanna ended in the 1970s. In 1976, the provincial government awarded residents of Wardlow a grant to install a cairn bearing the names of the 34 people interred at Cravath Corners Cemetery. The graves were previously unmarked, and the cemetery's original records were lost.

Today, Wardlow is a hamlet and agricultural community. The provincial and federal governments announced in January 2026 that residents of Wardlow will receive high-speed internet access by December 2026, via Xplore Inc.

== Demographics ==
Wardlow recorded a population of 28 in the 1991 Census of Population conducted by Statistics Canada.

== Places of interest ==
Wardlow is approximately 15.1 kilometres (9.4 mi) north of Dinosaur Provincial Park.

== Notable residents ==
- Aliya Saddy – born in Wardlow, sister of Edward Saddy. She married Mohammad Ali Bogra, third prime minister of Pakistan, in 1955. The relationship caused outrage in Pakistan as Bogra was already married at the time, and polygamy, while legal, was controversial.
- Edward Saddy (1931 – 2023) – Canada's first Muslim judge, born in Wardlow; brother of Aliya Saddy.

== See also ==
- List of communities in Alberta
- List of hamlets in Alberta
