= Carolside =

Carolside may refer to the following places:

- Carolside, Alberta, Canada
- Carolside, Scottish Borders, an estate in Scottish Borders, Scotland
- Carolside, Clarkston, a neighbourhood in Clarkston, Scotland
  - Carolside Primary School, school in the Carolside neighbourhood
