= Chinook, Alberta =

Chinook
- Hamlet
- Location of Chinook Chinook (Canada)
- Coordinates: 51°26′58″N 110°55′31″W
- Country: Canada
- Province: Alberta
- Region: Southern Alberta
- Census division: 4
- Special area: Special Area No. 3

Government
  - Type: Unincorporated
  - Governing body: Special Areas Board

Population (1991)
  - Total: 38
- Time zone: UTC−06:00 (Alberta Time)
- Area codes: 403, 587, 825

Chinook is a hamlet in southern Alberta, Canada within Special Area No. 3. It is located on Highway 9 approximately 119 kilometres (74 mi) northeast of Brooks.

Chinook was named after the Chinook wind, a "warm dry westerly wind from the Rocky Mountains."

== Demographics ==
Population history of Chinook
Year	Pop.	±%
1901		—
1906		—
1911		—
1916	189	—
1921	241	+27.5%
1926	198	−17.8%
1931	176	−11.1%
1936	134	−23.9%
1941	142	+6.0%
1946	130	−8.5%
1951	116	−10.8%
1956	154	+32.8%
1961	114	−26.0%
1966		—
1971		—
1976		—
1981		—
1986		—
1991	38	—
Source: Statistics Canada

Chinook recorded a population of 38 in the 1991 Census of Population conducted by Statistics Canada.

== See also ==
- List of communities in Alberta
- List of former urban municipalities in Alberta
- List of hamlets in Alberta
