= Sheerness Generating Station =

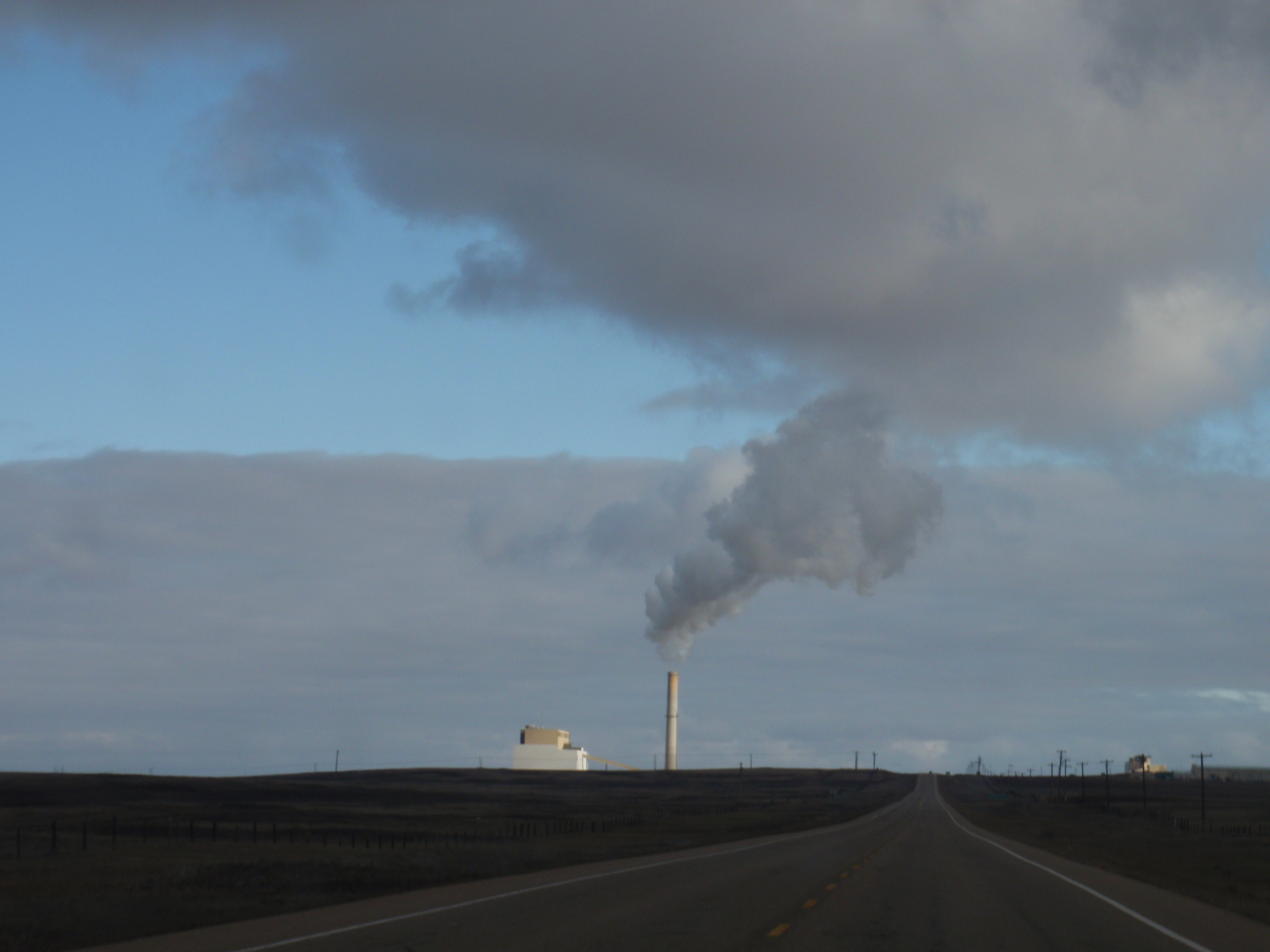
- Country: Canada
- Location: Special Area No. 2, near Hanna, Alberta
- Coordinates: 51°26′34″N 111°47′32″W
- Status: Operational
- Commission date: 1986
- Owners: Heartland Generation 50% TransAlta 50%
- Operator: Heartland Generation
- Employees: ~60

Thermal power station
- Primary fuel: Natural Gas
- Cooling source: Artificial pond supplied by the Red Deer River

Power generation
- Nameplate capacity: 800 MW

Sheerness Generating Station is a natural gas-fired power station owned by Heartland Generation (50%) and TransAlta (50%), located southeast of Hanna, Alberta.

== Description ==
Two Hitachi turbines with Alstom boilers.
