= Bindloss =

- Hamlet
- Location of Bindloss Bindloss (Canada)
- Coordinates: 50°52′48″N 110°16′25″W
- Country: Canada
- Province: Alberta
- Region: Southern Alberta
- Census division: 4
- Special area: Special Area No. 2

Government
  - Type: Unincorporated
  - Governing body: Special Areas Board

Population (1991)
  - Total: 14
- Time zone: UTC−06:00 (Alberta Time)
- Area codes: 403, 587, 825

Bindloss /ˈbaɪndloʊs/ is a hamlet in southern Alberta, Canada within Special Area No. 2. (Note: The Great Depression and droughts in the 1930s hit parts of southeastern Alberta very hard. The response of the Alberta government was to establish a new governing body, called the Special Areas Board - to provide municipal services and support. The board consists of four individuals appointed by the Provincial Government which oversee the local elected advisory councils. The board works like a normal municipal government, providing services such as water and emergency services, maintaining roads and parks, managing public land and community pastures, and planning for economic development and agricultural conservation.) It is located approximately 10 kilometres (6.2 mi) west of Highway 41 and 97 kilometres (60 mi) north of Medicine Hat.

It is named after English author Harold Edward Bindloss, who wrote a number of Western novels. Little remains of the original town site.

On 11 September 2017, an attempt to dispose of unexploded ordnance at Canadian Forces Base Suffield led to a fire that burned 220 square kilometres on the base plus another 58 square kilometres beyond. Bindloss was affected by the fire, which led to the death of 260 head of cattle, either killed in the fire, or put down because they were so badly burned.

== Climate ==
Climate data for Bindloss, Alberta
Month	Jan	Feb	Mar	Apr	May	Jun	Jul	Aug	Sep	Oct	Nov	Dec	Year
Record high °C (°F)	12.5 (54.5)	17.0 (62.6)	27.0 (80.6)	30.0 (86.0)	36.0 (96.8)	38.5 (101.3)	39.0 (102.2)	40.0 (104.0)	36.5 (97.7)	31.5 (88.7)	22.0 (71.6)	15.0 (59.0)	40.0 (104.0)
Mean daily maximum °C (°F)	−7.0 (19.4)	−2.9 (26.8)	4.5 (40.1)	14.0 (57.2)	19.6 (67.3)	23.5 (74.3)	27.4 (81.3)	26.7 (80.1)	20.4 (68.7)	12.6 (54.7)	0.4 (32.7)	−5.6 (21.9)	11.1 (52.0)
Daily mean °C (°F)	−12.5 (9.5)	−8.5 (16.7)	−1.3 (29.7)	6.8 (44.2)	12.3 (54.1)	16.5 (61.7)	19.8 (67.6)	18.8 (65.8)	12.7 (54.9)	5.6 (42.1)	−4.8 (23.4)	−10.9 (12.4)	4.5 (40.1)
Mean daily minimum °C (°F)	−17.9 (−0.2)	−14.1 (6.6)	−7.1 (19.2)	−0.5 (31.1)	4.9 (40.8)	9.5 (49.1)	12.2 (54.0)	10.9 (51.6)	5.0 (41.0)	−1.5 (29.3)	−9.9 (14.2)	−16.2 (2.8)	−2.1 (28.2)
Record low °C (°F)	−42.0 (−43.6)	−42.0 (−43.6)	−34.0 (−29.2)	−16.0 (3.2)	−9.5 (14.9)	−2.5 (27.5)	2.5 (36.5)	0.5 (32.9)	−9.5 (14.9)	−29.0 (−20.2)	−35.5 (−31.9)	−45.0 (−49.0)	−45.0 (−49.0)
Average precipitation mm (inches)	13.3 (0.52)	8.2 (0.32)	12.2 (0.48)	18.5 (0.73)	40.4 (1.59)	69.0 (2.72)	47.0 (1.85)	36.8 (1.45)	31.4 (1.24)	10.6 (0.42)	12.0 (0.47)	12.8 (0.50)	306.5 (12.07)
Average rainfall mm (inches)	0.1 (0.00)	0.1 (0.00)	1.3 (0.05)	14.7 (0.58)	39.9 (1.57)	63.5 (2.50)	47.0 (1.85)	36.8 (1.45)	30.4 (1.20)	8.8 (0.35)	1.9 (0.07)	1.2 (0.05)	245.7 (9.67)
Average snowfall cm (inches)	13.1 (5.2)	8.1 (3.2)	10.9 (4.3)	3.7 (1.5)	0.5 (0.2)	0.0 (0.0)	0.0 (0.0)	0.0 (0.0)	1.0 (0.4)	1.8 (0.7)	10.1 (4.0)	11.6 (4.6)	60.7 (23.9)
Source: Environment Canada

== Demographics ==
Bindloss recorded a population of 14 in the 1991 Census of Population conducted by Statistics Canada.

== See also ==
- List of communities in Alberta
- List of hamlets in Alberta
