= Sibbald =

- Hamlet
- Location of Sibbald Sibbald (Canada)
- Coordinates: 51°23′18″N 110°09′01″W
- Country: Canada
- Province: Alberta
- Region: Southern Alberta
- Census division: 4
- Special area: Special Area No. 3

Government
  - Type: Unincorporated
  - Governing body: Special Areas Board

Population (1991)
  - Total: 33
- Time zone: UTC−06:00 (Alberta Time)
- Area codes: 403, 587, 825

Sibbald is a hamlet in southern Alberta, Canada within Special Area No. 3. It is located on Highway 9, approximately 10 kilometres (6.2 mi) west of the provincial border with Saskatchewan and 154 kilometres (96 mi) northeast of Medicine Hat.

== Climate ==
Sibbald experiences a semi-arid climate (Köppen climate classification BSk). Winters are cold, while summers are warm to hot, and dry. Precipitation is generally low year round, with an annual average of 313.8 millimetres (12.35 in), and is heavily concentrated in the warmer months.

Climate data for Sibbald
Month	Jan	Feb	Mar	Apr	May	Jun	Jul	Aug	Sep	Oct	Nov	Dec	Year
Record high °C (°F)	11.1 (52.0)	11.7 (53.1)	21.5 (70.7)	31.0 (87.8)	36.5 (97.7)	37.5 (99.5)	38.5 (101.3)	40.6 (105.1)	36.1 (97.0)	29.4 (84.9)	21.5 (70.7)	14.5 (58.1)	40.6 (105.1)
Mean daily maximum °C (°F)	−10.4 (13.3)	−5.6 (21.9)	1.0 (33.8)	12.3 (54.1)	18.2 (64.8)	22.4 (72.3)	25.3 (77.5)	25.2 (77.4)	18.9 (66.0)	11.7 (53.1)	1.0 (33.8)	−6.7 (19.9)	9.4 (48.9)
Daily mean °C (°F)	−16.5 (2.3)	−11.6 (11.1)	−4.9 (23.2)	5.0 (41.0)	10.7 (51.3)	15.1 (59.2)	17.7 (63.9)	17.2 (63.0)	11.2 (52.2)	4.4 (39.9)	−5.0 (23.0)	−12.6 (9.3)	2.6 (36.7)
Mean daily minimum °C (°F)	−22.4 (−8.3)	−17.6 (0.3)	−10.7 (12.7)	−2.2 (28.0)	3.2 (37.8)	7.7 (45.9)	10.2 (50.4)	9.1 (48.4)	3.5 (38.3)	−3.0 (26.6)	−11.1 (12.0)	−18.3 (−0.9)	−4.3 (24.3)
Record low °C (°F)	−46.1 (−51.0)	−43.3 (−45.9)	−40.0 (−40.0)	−30.0 (−22.0)	−10.0 (14.0)	−5.0 (23.0)	0.6 (33.1)	−1.5 (29.3)	−9.0 (15.8)	−27.0 (−16.6)	−38.0 (−36.4)	−43.9 (−47.0)	−46.1 (−51.0)
Average precipitation mm (inches)	13.7 (0.54)	9.0 (0.35)	16.7 (0.66)	19.4 (0.76)	38.4 (1.51)	65.2 (2.57)	54.3 (2.14)	34.7 (1.37)	23.2 (0.91)	12.6 (0.50)	12.4 (0.49)	14.1 (0.56)	313.8 (12.35)
Source: Environment Canada

== Demographics ==
Population history of Sibbald
Year	Pop.	±%
1941	69	—
1951	86	+24.6%
1956	55	−36.0%
1961	75	+36.4%
1966	73	−2.7%
1971	60	−17.8%
1976	51	−15.0%
1981	45	−11.8%
1986	52	+15.6%
1991	33	−36.5%
Source: Statistics Canada

Sibbald recorded a population of 33 in the 1991 Census of Population conducted by Statistics Canada.

== See also ==
- List of communities in Alberta
- List of hamlets in Alberta
