= Marjorie Willison =

Canadian gardener

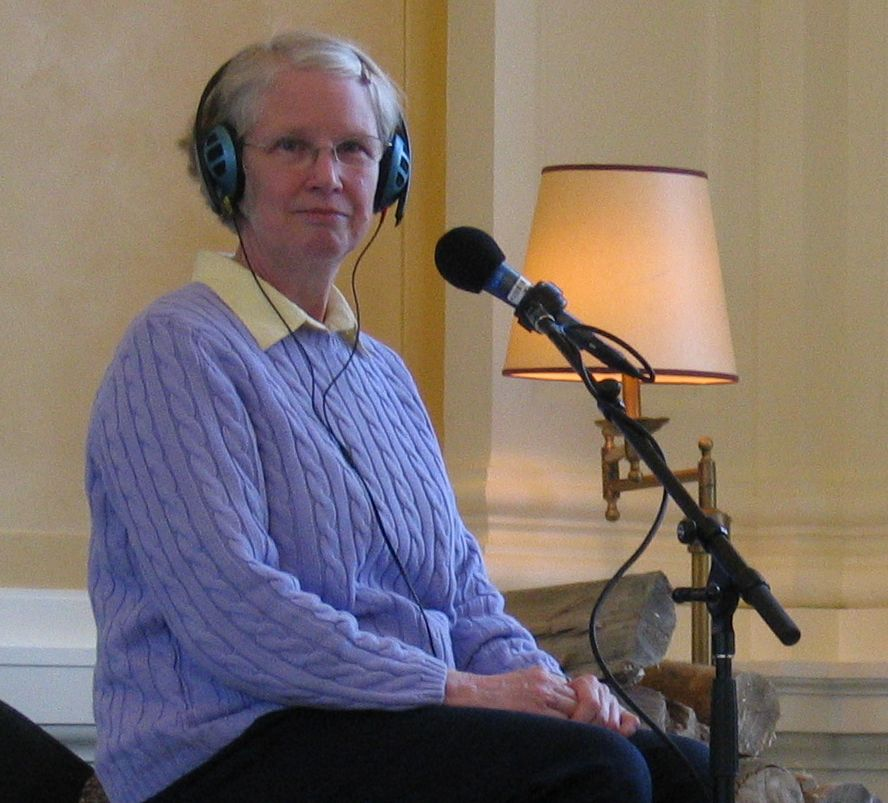
Marjorie Willison

Marjorie Willison is an author of books on gardening and a radio personality who answers gardeners' questions during regular appearances on "Maritime Noon", a show broadcast in New Brunswick, Nova Scotia and Prince Edward Island on CBC Radio One.

She was born in Hanna, Alberta, and studied at the University of Alberta (occupational therapy) and Dalhousie University, obtaining an M.Sc. in ecology. She married Martin Willison in 1978 and lives in Halifax, Nova Scotia. They have two children, Meghan and Kate.
