= Pollockville, Alberta =

Pollockville
- Hamlet
- Location of Pollockville in Alberta
- Coordinates: 51.1061°N 111.5903°W
- Country: Canada
- Province: Alberta
- Census division: No. 4
- Special area: No. 2

Government
  - Type: Unincorporated
  - Governing body: Special Areas Board

Population (1981)
  - Total: 19
- Time zone: UTC−06:00 (Alberta Time)

Pollockville is a hamlet in southern Alberta in Special Area No. 2. It is 20 km (12 mi) east of Highway 36 and 62 km (39 mi) northeast of Brooks.

== History ==
Pollockville is named for Robert Pollock, an early settler that lived nearby. Canadian National established a railway station in the community in 1919.

== Demographics ==
Population history of Pollockville
Year	Pop.	±%
1971	29	—
1976	29	+0.0%
1981	19	−34.5%
Source: Statistics Canada

In the 1981 Census of Population conducted by Statistics Canada, Pollockville had a population of 19.
