= Cessford, Alberta =

Cessford
- Hamlet
- Location within Alberta
- Coordinates: 51.0064°N 111.5567°W
- Country: Canada
- Province: Alberta
- Region: Southern Alberta
- Census division: 4
- Municipal district: Special Area No. 2

Government
  - Governing body: Special Areas Board

Population (1991)
  - Total: 31
- Time zone: UTC−06:00 (Alberta Time)
- Postal code span: List of T Postal Codes of Canada
- Area code: +1-403
- Highways: Highway 561; Highway 876

Cessford is a hamlet in southern Alberta, Canada within Special Area No. 2. It is located approximately 22 kilometres (14 mi) east of Highway 36 and 54 kilometres (34 mi) northeast of Brooks.

The hamlet took its name from a local farm.

== Demographics ==
Cessford recorded a population of 31 in the 1991 Census of Population conducted by Statistics Canada.

== See also ==
- List of communities in Alberta
- List of hamlets in Alberta
