= David Blyth Hanna =

Scottish-Canadian railway executive (1858–1938)

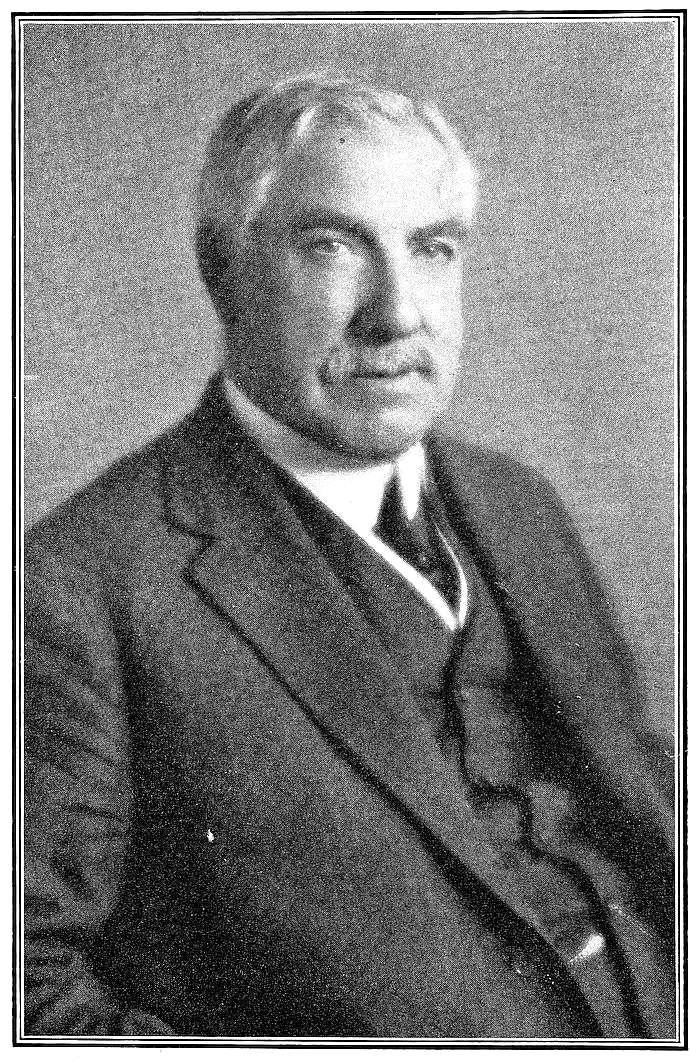
- Born: December 20, 1858; Thornliebank, Scotland
- Died: December 1, 1938 (aged 79); Toronto, Canada
- Occupation: Executive
- Years active: 1882–1922
- Employer: Canadian National Railway

David Blyth Hanna (December 20, 1858, Thornliebank, Scotland – December 1, 1938, Toronto) was a railway executive with the Canadian Northern Railway and the Canadian National Railways. Born in Thornliebank, Scotland, he emigrated to Canada in 1882 where he was employed by the Grand Trunk Railway. In 1896 he joined William Mackenzie and Donald Mann who organized the Canadian Northern Railway (CNoR) in Western Canada.

He was third vice-president of the CNoR, president of the Canadian Northern Quebec Railway Company and of the Quebec and Lake St. John Railway Company. After the federal government took control of the bankrupt CNoR in 1918, Hanna was named president of the reorganized company in September 1918.

He was appointed the first president of the Board of Directors of the Canadian National Railways in 1919. He retired in 1922 and was appointed first chairman of the Liquor Control Board of Ontario 1927–28. Sir Henry Thornton (1871–1933) succeeded him as second president of the CNR.

The town of Hanna, Alberta is named after him.

== Sources ==
- Hanna, D.B. Trains of Recollection Drawn from Fifty Years of Railway Service in Scotland and Canada, and Told to Arthur Hawkes. Toronto: Macmillan, 1924.
