= Sunnynook, Alberta =

Sunnynook
- Hamlet
- Location of Sunnynook Sunnynook (Canada)
- Coordinates: 51°17′38″N 111°40′05″W
- Country: Canada
- Province: Alberta
- Region: Southern Alberta
- Census division: 4
- Special area: Special Area No. 2

Government
  - Type: Unincorporated
  - Governing body: Special Areas Board

Population (1991)
  - Total: 13
- Time zone: UTC−06:00 (Alberta Time)
- Area codes: 403, 587, 825

Sunnynook is a hamlet in southern Alberta, Canada within Special Area No. 2. It is located approximately 10 kilometres (6.2 mi) east of Highway 36 and 86 kilometres (53 mi) northeast of Brooks. The hamlet formerly housed the Berry Creek Community School Division office and area post office until amalgamation of the school division into Prairie Land Regional Division.

== Demographics ==
Sunnynook recorded a population of 13 in the 1991 Census of Population conducted by Statistics Canada.

== See also ==
- List of communities in Alberta
- List of hamlets in Alberta
