= Atlee, Alberta =

Coordinates: 50°50′30″N 110°57′01″W

Location of Atlee Alberta

Atlee is a locality in Special Area No. 2, Alberta, Canada. It is located 1 km (0.62 mi) north of Highway 555 on Range Road 75, approximately 90 km (56 mi) north of the City of Medicine Hat. It has an elevation of 2,559 ft (780 m).

The community is named after W. Atlee James, a railroad official.

== See also ==
- List of communities in Alberta
- List of ghost towns in Alberta
