= Special Area No. 2 =

Special area in Alberta, Canada

- Special area
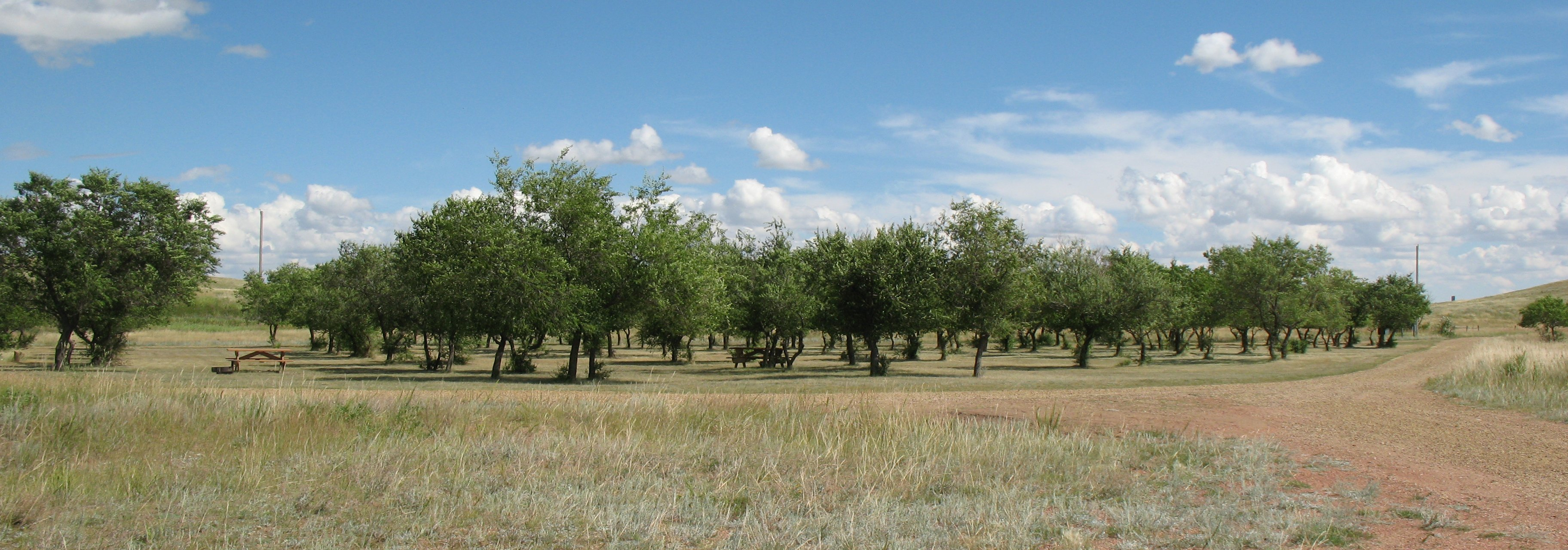
- Little Fish Lake Provincial Park

- Location within Alberta
- Coordinates: 51.4°N 111.7°W
- Country: Canada
- Province: Alberta
- Planning region: Red Deer
- Incorporated: April 7, 1959

Government
  - Governing body: Special Areas Board
  - Municipal office: Hanna
  - District office: Hanna

Area (2021)
  - Land: 9,195.06 km^{2} (3,550.23 sq mi)

Population (2021)
  - Total: 1,860
  - Density: 0.2/km^{2} (0.52/sq mi)
- Time zone: UTC−06:00 (Alberta Time)
- Forward sortation area: T0J
- Area code: 403, 587, 825
- Website: specialareas.ab.ca

Special Area No. 2 is a special area in southern Alberta, Canada. It is a rural municipality similar to a municipal district; however, the elected council is overseen by four representatives appointed by the province, the Special Areas Board.

Special Area 2 has two provincial parks, Little Fish Lake Provincial Park, and the portion of Dinosaur Provincial Park north of the Red Deer River. Lakes include Little Fish Lake, Dowling Lake, and the south portion of Sullivan Lake.

== Geography ==
=== Communities and localities ===
The following urban municipalities are surrounded by Special Area No. 2.

Cities

- none

Towns

- Hanna

Villages

- Empress

Summer villages

- none

The following hamlets are located within Special Area No. 2.

- Bindloss
- Buffalo
- Carolside
- Cavendish
- Cessford
- Dorothy
- Iddesleigh
- Jenner
- Pollockville
- Richdale
- Rose Lynn
- Scapa
- Scotfield
- Sheerness
- Stanmore
- Sunnynook
- Wardlow
- Watts

The following localities are located within Special Area No. 2.

- Alness
- Atlee
- Batter Junction
- Berry Creek
- Bonar
- Bullpound
- Burfield
- Clivale
- Comet
- Dowling
- Finnegan
- Galarneauville
- Garden Plain
- Halliday
- Halsbury
- Howie
- Hutton

- Lawsonburg
- Lonebutte
- Lorne Crossing
- Majestic
- Medicine Hat Junction
- Millerfield
- Sharrow
- Spondin
- Stoppington
- Taplow
- Trefoil
- West Wingham

== Demographics ==
In the 2021 Census of Population conducted by Statistics Canada, Special Area No. 2 had a population of 1,860 living in 644 of its 783 total private dwellings, a change of −2.4% from its 2016 population of 1,905. With a land area of 9,195.06 km^{2} (3,550.23 sq mi), it had a population density of 0.2/km^{2} (0.5/sq mi) in 2021.

In the 2016 Census of Population conducted by Statistics Canada, Special Area No. 2 had a population of 1,905 living in 648 of its 750 total private dwellings, a change of −5.9% from its 2011 population of 2,025. With a land area of 9,347.57 km^{2} (3,609.12 sq mi), it had a population density of 0.2/km^{2} (0.5/sq mi) in 2016.

== See also ==
- List of communities in Alberta
- List of improvement districts in Alberta
- List of municipal districts in Alberta
- List of municipalities in Alberta
