= Hanna, Alberta =

Town in Alberta, Canada

Hanna
- Town
- Town of Hanna
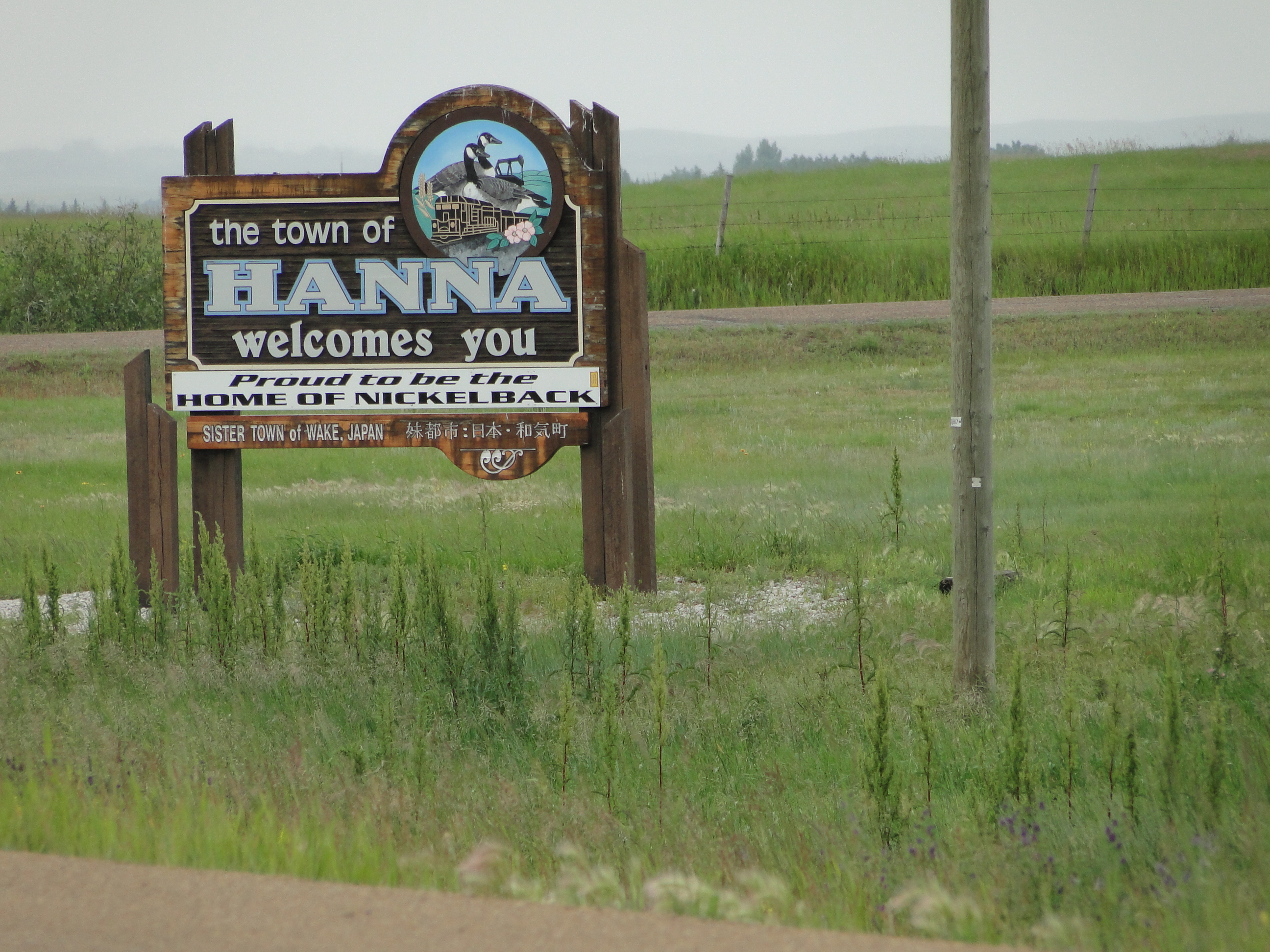

- Location within Special Area No. 2 Location within Alberta
- Coordinates: 51°38′18″N 111°56′31″W
- Country: Canada
- Province: Alberta
- Region: Southern Alberta
- Census division: 4
- Incorporated
  - Village: December 31, 1912
  - Town: April 14, 1914
- Founder: Canadian Northern Railway
- Named for: David Blyth Hanna

Government
  - Mayor: Elizabeth Lajoie
  - Governing body: Hanna Town Council

Area (2021)
  - Land: 8.4 km^{2} (3.2 sq mi)
- Elevation: 785 m (2,575 ft)

Population (2021)
  - Total: 2,394
  - Density: 285.1/km^{2} (738/sq mi)
- Time zone: UTC−06:00 (Alberta Time)
- Postal code span: T0J 1P0
- Area code: 403, 587, 825
- Highway: Highway 9
- Website: www.hanna.ca

Hanna is a town in Central Alberta, Canada, approximately 57 km (35 mi) northeast of the town of Drumheller.

It is surrounded by Special Area No. 2 and the district office of the Alberta government's Special Areas administration is located in Hanna.

== History ==
The town was first settled in 1912 and was incorporated in 1914. The Canadian Northern Railway's Goose Lake line running between Saskatoon to Calgary was built there at that time. Hanna was named after David Blyth Hanna, the third vice president of the Canadian Northern Railway. It was a division point of the Canadian Northern Railway and had a 10-stall railway roundhouse.

The Depression-era drought hurt the area. In 1939, the Alberta government established a Special Area to provide additional support for residents in that part of the province.

== Demographics ==
In the 2021 Census of Population conducted by Statistics Canada, the Town of Hanna had a population of 2,394 living in 1,100 of its 1,257 total private dwellings, a change of −6.4% from its 2016 population of 2,559. With a land area of 8.4 km^{2} (3.2 sq mi), it had a population density of 285.0/km^{2} (738.1/sq mi) in 2021.

In the 2016 Census of Population conducted by Statistics Canada, the Town of Hanna recorded a population of 2,559 living in 1,149 of its 1,246 total private dwellings, a −4.3% change from its 2011 population of 2,673. With a land area of 8.81 km^{2} (3.40 sq mi), it had a population density of 290.5/km^{2} (752.3/sq mi) in 2016.

== Economy ==
The town's main industries are agriculture, oil production, power generation, tourism, and coal mining. It is the centre of a large trading area called Short Grass County and is the home of approximately 200 businesses. Natural resources in the Hanna area are coal, petroleum, natural gas, and bentonite.

== Notable people ==
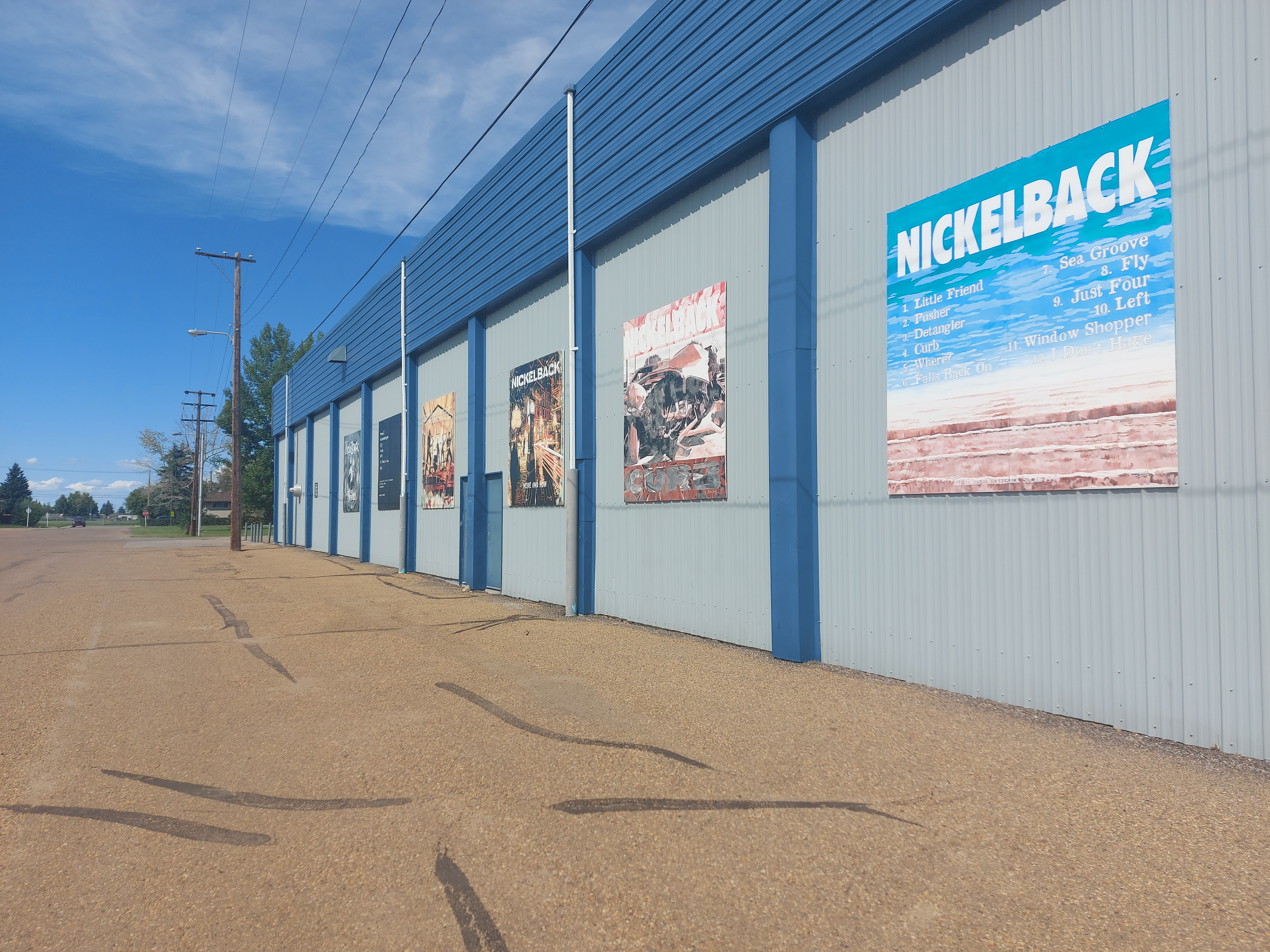
Nickelback album covers on Hanna Arena

- Robert Raymond Cook, mass murderer, last person to be executed in Alberta.
- Chad Kroeger, Mike Kroeger, Brandon Kroeger, and Ryan Peake, members of the rock band Nickelback. The music video for the band’s song Photograph was filmed in Hanna, which features Chad Kroeger singing about his upbringing in the town.
- Shirley McClellan, former provincial politician
- Lanny McDonald, former professional hockey player, chairman of the Hockey Hall of Fame, and a Stanley Cup trustee.
- Glen Motz, Conservative MP for Medicine Hat—Cardston—Warner
- Blake Nill, college football coach and former professional football player
- Jim Nill, general manager of the Dallas Stars and former professional hockey player
- Milt Pahl, former provincial politician
- Dave Ruhl, former professional wrestler
- Marjorie Willison, author and radio personality

== Sister town ==
- Wake, Okayama is the sister town of Hanna.
