= Division No. 4, Alberta =

Census division in Canada

Coordinates: 51°38′41″N 111°55′59″W

Division No. 4
- Census division in Alberta
- Country: Canada
- Province: Alberta

Area
  - Total: 21,055 km^{2} (8,129 sq mi)

Population (2021)
  - Total: 9,220
  - Density: 0.438/km^{2} (1.13/sq mi)

Division No. 4 is a census division in Alberta, Canada. It is located in the northeast corner of southern Alberta and its largest urban community is the Town of Hanna. The census division contains all of Alberta's Special Areas as well as the Municipal District of Acadia. Division No. 4 is the smallest census division in Alberta according to population.

== Census subdivisions ==
The following census subdivisions (municipalities or municipal equivalents) are located within Alberta's Division No. 4.

- Towns
  - Hanna
  - Oyen
- Villages
  - Consort
  - Empress
  - Veteran
  - Youngstown
- Hamlets
  - Acadia Valley
  - Altario
  - Bindloss
  - Cereal
  - Cessford
  - Chinook
  - Compeer
  - Dorothy
  - Iddesleigh
  - Kirriemuir
  - Jenner
  - Monitor
  - New Brigden
  - Richdale
  - Sedalia
  - Sibbald
  - Sunnynook
  - Wardlow
- Municipal districts
  - Acadia No. 34, M.D. of
- Special areas
  - Special Area No. 2
  - Special Area No. 3
  - Special Area No. 4

== Demographics ==
Historical population
Year	Pop.	±%
1991	11,947	—
1996	12,046	+0.8%
2001	11,300	−6.2%
2006	10,600	−6.2%
2011	10,078	−4.9%
2016	9,573	−5.0%
2021	9,220	−3.7%

In the 2021 Census of Population conducted by Statistics Canada, Division No. 4 had a population of 9,220 living in 3,623 of its 4,293 total private dwellings, a change of −3.7% from its 2016 population of 9,573. With a land area of 21,055.21 km^{2} (8,129.46 sq mi), it had a population density of 0.4/km^{2} (1.1/sq mi) in 2021.

== See also ==
- List of census divisions of Alberta
- List of communities in Alberta
