= Special Areas Board =

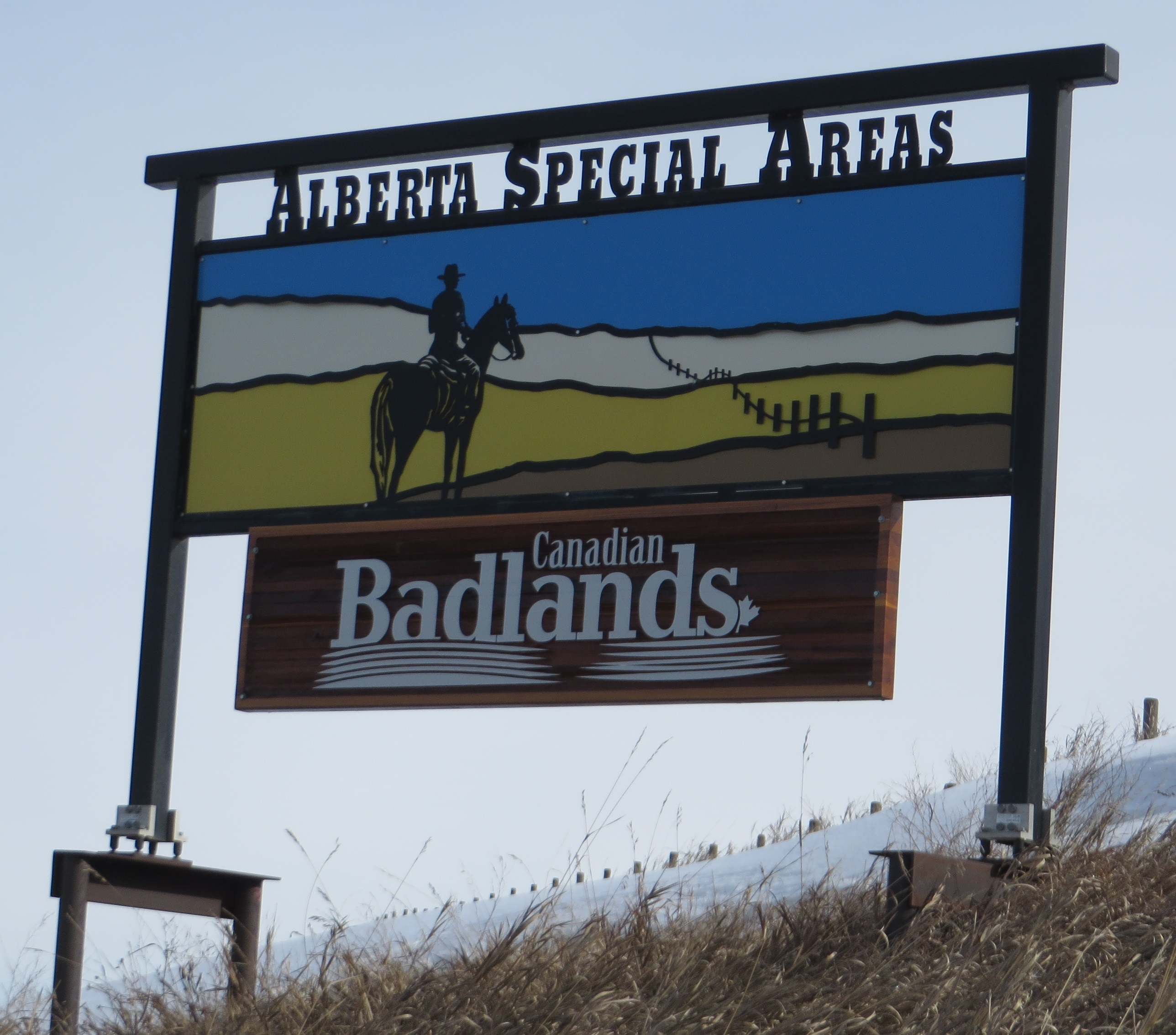
- Special Areas boundary sign

- Distribution of Alberta's three special areas
- Country: Canada
- Province: Alberta
- Regions: Central and Southern Alberta
- Census division: No. 4
- Special Areas Act: 1938

Government
  - Governing body: Special Areas Board
  - Chairperson: Ryan Francis (acting)
  - Minister of Municipal Affairs: Ric McIver
  - District office: Hanna

Area (2021)
  - Land: 19,964.19 km^{2} (7,708.22 sq mi)

Population (2016)
  - Total: 4,238
  - Density: 0.21/km^{2} (0.54/sq mi)
- Time zone: UTC−06:00 (Alberta Time)
- Website: Special Areas Board

The Special Areas Board is the governing body of Alberta's special areas. Special areas are designated rural municipalities similar to municipal districts; however, the elected advisory councils are overseen by four representatives appointed by the province, under the direct authority of Alberta Municipal Affairs.

The three special areas were created in 1938 under the authority of the Special Areas Act as a result of hardship brought upon a particular area in southeastern Alberta during the drought of the 1930s. A special area is not to be confused with a specialized municipality, which is a completely different municipal status.

The special areas are administered under the provisions of the Special Areas Act. The three special areas are located in southeast Alberta within Census Division 4.

== History ==
The Special Areas Act of 1938 created the six special areas of Tilley East, Berry Creek, Sullivan Lake, Sounding Creek, Neutral Hills, and Bow West, which had previously been special municipal areas. In 1939, these six special areas were consolidated into the four special areas listed below. The original six special areas included 3.2 million hectares, while the current three only include 2.1 million hectares.

- Tilley East Special Area, No. 1: The northern part of this special area was withdrawn and added to Berry Creek-Sullivan Lake Special Area in 1941, and now forms the portion of Special Area No. 2 that is south of the Red Deer River. Tilley East was still a special area in 1955, but was not by 1959. This area is now part of Cypress County, formerly the Municipal District of Cypress No. 1.
- Berry Creek-Sullivan Lake Special Area, No. 2: The eastern portion of this special area was withdrawn and added to the Sounding Creek-Neutral Hills Special Area in 1939. The northern part of Tilley East Special Area was added to this special area in 1941. It was renamed Special Area No. 2 in 1959.
- Sounding Creek-Neutral Hills Special Area, No. 3: The eastern portion of the Berry Creek-Sullivan Lake Special Area was added to this special area in 1939. It was renamed Special Area No. 3 in 1959. In 1969, the northern portion of Special Area No. 3 became Special Area No. 4.
- Bow West Special Area, No. 4: This area was still a special area in 1955, but was not by 1959. It is now part of Vulcan County and the Municipal District of Taber.

== List ==
Alberta's three special areas had a combined population of 4,238 in 2021.

List of special areas in Alberta
Special area	Incorporation date (special area)	2021 Census of Population				
Special area	Incorporation date (special area)	Population (2021)	Population (2016)	Change	Area (km^{2})	Population density (/km^{2})
Special Area No. 2	April 7, 1959	1,860	1,905	−2.4%	9,195.06	0.2
Special Area No. 3	April 7, 1959	1,142	1,153	−1.0%	6,469.33	0.2
Special Area No. 4	January 1, 1969	1,236	1,237	−0.1%	4,299.8	0.3
Total special areas	—	4,238	4,295	−1.3%	19,964.19	0.2

== See also ==
- List of census divisions of Alberta
- List of communities in Alberta
- List of municipal districts in Alberta
- List of municipalities in Alberta
- Special Areas Act 1934, a British act also imposed due to hardships
- List of specialized municipalities in Alberta
