= Wapiti (disambiguation) =

Wapiti, or elk, are a species of large deer.

Wapiti may also refer to:

== Animals ==
- Boulder darter (Etheostoma wapiti), a species of fish

== Places ==
- Wapiti Pass, a mountain pass in British Columbia, Canada
- Wapiti River, a river in British Columbia and Alberta, Canada
- Wapiti Lake Provincial Park, a provincial park in British Columbia, Canada
- Wapiti Ranger Station, a ranger station in Shoshone National Forest, Wyoming, United States
- Grande Prairie-Wapiti, a provincial electoral district in Alberta, Canada
- Wapiti, Wyoming, a town in Wyoming, United States

== Other uses ==
- Westland Wapiti, a British military aeroplane built in the 1920s
- The Wapiti tribe, a fictional Native American tribe in Red Dead Redemption 2.
