= Grande Prairie-Wapiti =

Provincial electoral district in Alberta, Canada

Alberta electoral district
- Grande Prairie-Wapiti within Alberta, 2017 boundaries

Provincial electoral district
- Legislature: Legislative Assembly of Alberta
MLA
Ron Wiebe
United Conservative
- District created: 1993
- First contested: 1993
- Last contested: 2023

Grande Prairie-Wapiti is a provincial electoral district in northwestern Alberta, Canada. It is one of 87 mandated to return a single member to the Legislative Assembly of Alberta using the first past the post method of voting.

The electoral district was created in the 1993 boundary redistribution from the old Grande Prairie electoral district and significantly modified in the 2017 redistribution.

The district and its antecedent have been a stronghold for conservative candidates in recent decades. The representative for this district is United Conservative Ron Wiebe. Prior to 2023 the district was represented by Travis Toews who won election for the first time in 2017. To date there have been five representatives who have held the district.

The riding takes its name from the city of Grande Prairie and the Wapiti River.

== Geography ==
While a predominantly rural riding, Grande Prairie-Wapiti includes a few neighbourhoods on the east side of the city of Grande Prairie (including Cobblestone, Countryside, Crystal Heights, Crystal Landing, Hillside, Ivy Lake, and Smith). Four small towns are also located in the riding - Beaverlodge, Hythe, Sexsmith, and Wembley. The bulk of the riding's area is made up of rural municipalities, including almost all of the County of Grande Prairie No. 1 and a portion of the Municipal District of Greenview No. 16.

The riding's Indigenous community includes the Horse Lake First Nation and the Wanyandie Flats East settlement of the unrecognized Aseniwuche Winewak Nation.

Grande Prairie-Wapiti surrounds the riding of Grande Prairie and borders Central Peace-Notley to the north and east and West Yellowhead to the south. The riding's western boundary is the Alberta-British Columbia border.

== History ==
The electoral district was created in the 1993 boundary redistribution from the old Grande Prairie electoral district. It remained mostly unchanged in the 1997 and 2003 re-distributions. The Boundaries Commission proposed to abolish the district to create a completely urban Grande Prairie district but it changed its decision under public pressure. The 2010 distribution made minor changes to the border with Grande Prairie-Smoky in the city of Grande Prairie but stayed the same in the rural areas.

=== Boundary history ===
57 Grande Prairie-Wapiti 2003 boundaries
Bordering districts
North	East	West	South
Dunvegan-Central Peace	Grande Prairie-Smoky	British Columbia boundary	West Yellowhead
riding map goes here			
Legal description from the Statutes of Alberta 2003, Electoral Divisions Act.
Starting at the intersection of the west boundary of the Province and the north boundary of Sec. 7 in Twp. 75, Rge. 13 W6; then 1. east along the north boundary of Secs. 7, 8, 9, 10, 11 and 12 in the Twp. and the north boundary of Sec. 7 in Twp. 75, Rge. 12 W6 to the east boundary of the Sec.; 2. south along the east boundary to the north boundary of Sec. 5 in the Twp.; 3. east along the north boundary of Secs. 5, 4 and 3 in the Twp. to the eastboundary of Sec. 3 in the Twp.; 4. south along the east boundary to the north boundary of Twp. 74; 5. east along the north boundary to the east boundary of Sec. 2 in Twp. 75, Rge. 11 W6; 6. north along the east boundary to the north boundary of Sec. 12 in the Twp.; 7. east along the north boundary of Sec. 12 in Twp. 75, Rge. 11 W6 and east along the north boundary of Sec. 7, Rge. 10 in Twp. 75 to the east boundary of Sec. 18 in the Twp.; 8. north along the east boundary of Secs. 18 and 19 in the Twp. to the north boundary of Sec. 20 in the Twp.; 9. east along the north boundary of Secs. 20, 21 and 22 in the Twp. to the east boundary of Sec. 27 in the Twp.; 10. north along the east boundary to the north boundary of Sec. 26 in the Twp.; 11. east along the north boundary to the east boundary of Sec. 35 in the Twp.; 12. north along the east boundary to the north boundary of Twp. 75; 13. east along the north boundary to the east boundary of Sec. 33 in Twp. 75, Rge. 8 W6; 14. south along the east boundary of Secs. 33, 28, 21 and 16 in the Twp. to the north boundary of Sec. 10 in the Twp.; 15. east along the north boundary of Secs. 10, 11 and 12 in the Twp. and the north boundary of Secs. 7, 8, 9, 10, 11 and 12 in Twp. 75, Rge. 7 W6 to the east boundary of Rge. 7 W6; 16. south along the east boundary to the north boundary of Twp. 72, Rge. 6 W6; 17. east along the north boundary of the Twp. to the intersection with the right bank of the Grande Prairie Creek; 18. downstream along the Grande Prairie Creek to the intersection with the Bear River; 19. downstream along the Bear River to the north Grande Prairie city boundary; 20. in a generally southerly, westerly and southerly direction along the city boundary to the centre line of 100 Avenue (Richmond Avenue); 21. east along the centre line of 100 Avenue to the Grande Prairie city boundary; 22. south and west along the city boundary to the centre line of the Alberta RailNet Inc.; 23. in a generally southerly direction along the centre line of the Alberta RailNet Inc. to the north boundary of Twp. 70; 24. east along the north boundary to the east boundary of Sec. 31 in Twp. 70, Rge. 5 W6; 25. south along the east boundary of Secs. 31, 30 and 19 in the Twp. to the right bank of the Wapiti River; 26. downstream along the right bank of the Wapiti River to the left bank of the Smoky River; 27. upstream along the left bank of the Smoky River to the north boundary of Twp. 58; 28. west along the north boundary to the west boundary of the Province; 29. north along the west boundary of the province to the starting point.
Note:

62 Grande Prairie-Wapiti 2010 boundaries
Bordering districts
North	East	West	South
Dunvegan-Central Peace-Notley	Grande Prairie-Smoky	British Columbia boundary	West Yellowhead
Legal description from the Statutes of Alberta 2010, Electoral Divisions Act.

=== Electoral history ===
Members of the Legislative Assembly for Grande Prairie-Wapiti
Assembly	Years	Member	Party
See Grande Prairie 1930-1993
23rd	1993–1997	Wayne Jacques	Progressive; Conservative
24th	1997–2001	Wayne Jacques	Progressive; Conservative
25th	2001–2004	Gordon Graydon	Progressive; Conservative
26th	2004–2008	Gordon Graydon	Progressive; Conservative
27th	2008–2012	Wayne Drysdale	Progressive; Conservative
28th	2012-2015	Wayne Drysdale	Progressive; Conservative
29th	2015–2017	Wayne Drysdale	Progressive; Conservative
29th	2017–2019	Wayne Drysdale	United; Conservative
30th	2019–2023	Travis Toews	United; Conservative
31st	2023–present	Ron Wiebe	United; Conservative

The electoral district was created in the 1993 boundary redistribution from the old Grande Prairie district. The first representative elected in 1993 was Progressive Conservative candidate Wayne Jaques. He won a hotly contested race over Liberal candidate Dwight Logan to pick up the new district for his party. Jaques was re-elected in the 1997 election with a much larger margin. He retired from provincial politics in 2001.

The second representative was Progressive Conservative was Gordon Graydon who won his first term in office in 2001 with a landslide over a field of five other candidates. He won a second term in the 2004 general election winning over half the popular vote. After the 2004 election Premier Ralph Klein appointed Graydon Minister of Gaming. He held that post until 2006. Graydon retired from provincial politics in 2008.

The third representative is current Progressive Conservative MLA is Wayne Drysdale who was elected in the 2008 election for the first time.

== Legislative election results ==
=== 1993 ===
1993 Alberta general election
Party	Candidate	Votes	%
Progressive Conservative	Wayne Jacques	4,457	48.03%
Liberal	Dwight Logan	3,942	42.48%
New Democratic	Trish Wright	880	9.49%
Total		9,279	100.00%
Rejected, spoiled and declined		28	
Eligible electors / Turnout		16,272	57.20%
Progressive Conservative pickup new district.			
Source(s) "Grande Prairie-Wapiti results 1993 Alberta general election". Alberta Heritage Community Foundation.

=== 1997 ===
1997 Alberta general election
Party	Candidate	Votes	%	±%
Progressive Conservative	Wayne Jacques	5,592	63.24%	+15.21%
Liberal	Ray Stitsen	2,003	22.65%	-19.83%
New Democratic	Campbell Ross	1,247	14.10%	+4.61%
Total		8,842	100.00%	
Rejected, spoiled and declined		23		
Eligible electors / Turnout		18,901	46.90%	-10.30%
Progressive Conservative hold		Swing		+17.52%
Source(s) "1997 General Election". Elections Alberta. Archived from the original on February 14, 2012.

=== 2001 ===
2001 Alberta general election
Party	Candidate	Votes	%	±%
Progressive Conservative	Gordon Graydon	5,674	65.50%	+2.26%
Liberal	Ray Stitsen	1,489	17.19%	-5.46%
New Democratic	Elroy Deimert	819	9.46%	-4.64%
Social Credit	Ivo Noga	432	4.99%	
Independent	Robert Weberg	112	1.29%	
Total		8,662	100.00%	
Rejected, spoiled and declined		22		
Eligible electors / Turnout		19,730	44.01%	-2.89
Progressive Conservative hold		Swing		+3.86%
Source(s) "Grande Prairie-Wapiti Official Results 2001 Alberta general election" (PDF). Elections Alberta.

=== 2004 ===
2004 Alberta general election
Party	Candidate	Votes	%	±%
Progressive Conservative	Gordon Graydon	4,346	55.07%	-10.43%
Liberal	Cibylla Rakestraw	1,681	21.30%	+4.11%
New Democratic	Jerry MacDonald	971	12.30%	+2.84%
Alberta Alliance	John Hilton-O'Brien	546	6.92%	
Greens	Allan Webber	348	4.41%	
Total		7,892	100.00%	
Rejected, spoiled, and declined		34		
Eligible electors / Turnout		21,683	36.58%	
Progressive Conservative hold		Swing		-7.27%
Source(s) "Grande Prairie-Wapiti Statement of Official Results 2004 Alberta general election" (PDF). Elections Alberta.

=== 2008 ===
2008 Alberta general election
Party	Candidate	Votes	%	±%
Progressive Conservative	Wayne Drysdale	5,145	66.70%	+11.63%
Liberal	Augustine Ebinu	1,304	16.90%	-4.40%
New Democratic	Manuela Campbell	829	10.75%	-1.55%
Greens	Allan Webber	436	5.65%	+1.24%
Total		7,714	100.00%	
Rejected, spoiled and declined		74		
Eligible electors / turnout		29,053	26.81%	-9.77%
Progressive Conservative hold		Swing		+8.02%
Source(s) The Report on the March 3, 2008 Provincial General Election of the Twenty-seventh Legislative Assembly. Elections Alberta. July 28, 2008. pp. 430–433.

=== 2012 ===
2012 Alberta general election
Party	Candidate	Votes	%	±%
Progressive Conservative	Wayne Drysdale	6,712	51.63%	-15.07%
Wildrose	Ethane Jarvis	4,509	34.68%	
New Democratic	Paula Anderson	1,209	9.30%	-1.38%
Liberal	Alya Nazarali	365	2.81%	-14.09%
Independent	Anthony Barendregt	204	1.57%	
Total valid votes		12,999	100.00%	
Rejected, spoiled, and declined		96		
Eligible electors / Turnout		30,764	42.57%	+15.76%
Progressive Conservative hold		Swing		-24.89%
Source(s) "Grande Prairie-Wapiti".

=== 2015 ===
2015 Alberta general election
Party	Candidate	Votes	%	±%
Progressive Conservative	Wayne Drysdale	6,229	35.57	-16.06
New Democratic	Mary Dahr	5,062	28.90	+19.60
Wildrose	Laila Goodridge	4,175	23.84	-10.84
Alberta Party	Rory Tarant	2,048	11.69	
Total		17,514	100.00	
Rejected, spoiled, and declined		77		
Eligible electors / turnout		37,445	46.98	+4.41
Progressive Conservative hold		Swing		-17.55
Source(s) "Grande Prairie-Wapiti".

2015 Alberta general election redistributed results
Party	Votes	%
Progressive Conservative	6,012	37.20
Wildrose	4,669	28.89
New Democratic	4,310	26.67
Alberta Party	847	5.24
Liberal	324	2.00
Source(s) Source: Ridingbuilder

=== 2019 ===
2019 Alberta general election
Party	Candidate	Votes	%	±%
United Conservative	Travis Toews	17,772	74.85	+8.76
New Democratic	Shannon Dunfield	3,523	14.84	-11.83
Alberta Party	Jason Jones	2,227	9.38	+4.14
Independent	Terry Dueck	222	0.93	–
Total		23,744	99.19	–
Rejected, spoiled and declined		193	0.81	
Turnout		23,937	70.94	
Eligible electors		33,741		
United Conservative notional hold		Swing		+10.30
Source(s) Source: "64 - Grande Prairie-Wapiti, 2019 Alberta general election". officialresults.elections.ab.ca. Elections Alberta.

=== 2023 ===
2023 Alberta general election
Party	Candidate	Votes	%	±%
United Conservative	Ron Wiebe	15,093	76.22	+1.38
New Democratic	Dustin Archibald	4,063	20.52	+5.68
Alberta Independence	Brooklyn Biegel	645	3.26	–
Total		19,801	99.66	–
Rejected and declined		68	0.34	
Turnout		19,869	54.52	
Eligible voters		36,444		
United Conservative hold		Swing		-2.15
Source(s) Source: Elections Alberta

== Senate nominee election results ==
=== 2004 ===
2004 Senate nominee election results: Grande Prairie-Wapiti				Turnout 43.52%	
Affiliation	Candidate	Votes	% votes	% ballots	Rank
Progressive Conservative	Cliff Breitkreuz	3,122	16.26%	50.36%	3
Progressive Conservative	Betty Unger	2,750	14.32%	44.36%	2
Progressive Conservative	Bert Brown	2,488	12.96%	40.13%	1
Independent	Link Byfield	2,127	11.08%	34.31%	4
Progressive Conservative	David Usherwood	1,727	9.00%	27.86%	6
Progressive Conservative	Jim Silye	1,525	7.94%	24.60%	5
Alberta Alliance	Michael Roth	1,476	7.69%	23.81%	7
Alberta Alliance	Vance Gough	1,346	7.01%	21.71%	8
Independent	Tom Sindlinger	1,331	6.93%	21.47%	9
Alberta Alliance	Gary Horan	1,306	6.81%	21.07%	10
Total votes		19,198	100%		
Total ballots		6,200	3.10 votes per ballot		
Rejected, spoiled and declined		1,619			

Voters had the option of selecting four candidates on the ballot

== Student vote results ==
=== 2004 ===
Participating schools
Beaverlodge Elementary School
Helleny Taylor School
Kateri Mission Catholic School
Saint Joseph Catholic High School
St. Gerrard School

On November 19, 2004, a student vote was conducted at participating Alberta schools to parallel the 2004 Alberta general election results. The vote was designed to educate students and simulate the electoral process for persons who have not yet reached the legal majority. The vote was conducted in 80 of the 83 provincial electoral districts with students voting for actual election candidates. Schools with a large student body that reside in another electoral district had the option to vote for candidates outside of the electoral district then where they were physically located.

2004 Alberta student vote results
Affiliation	Candidate	Votes	%
Progressive Conservative	Gordon Graydon	458	43.25%
Green	Allan Webber	193	18.22%
NDP	Jerry MacDonald	190	17.94%
Liberal	Cibylla Rakestraw	182	17.19%
Alberta Alliance	John Hilton-O'Brien	36	3.40%
Total		1,059	100%
Rejected, Spoiled and Declined		36	

=== 2012 ===
2012 Alberta student vote results
Affiliation	Candidate	Votes	%	
Progressive Conservative		Wayne Drysdale		%
Wildrose	Ethane Jarvis			
Liberal			%	
NDP	Paula Anderson		%	
Total			100%	

== See also ==
- List of Alberta provincial electoral districts
- Canadian provincial electoral districts
