= Bad Heart, Alberta =

Locality in Alberta, Canada

Bad Heart
- Settlement
- Location of Bad Heart in Alberta
- Coordinates: 55°29′46″N 118°16′57″W
- Country: Canada
- Province: Alberta
- Region: Northern Alberta
- Census division: Division No. 19, Alberta
- County: County of Grande Prairie No. 1
- First settled: 1918
- Recognized for federal maps: March 2, 1948
- Area code: 780

Bad Heart (also recorded as Badheart) is a locality in northern Alberta, Canada, within the County of Grande Prairie No. 1. Connected by range roads to Alberta Highway 733, it is approximately 50 km (31 mi) northeast of Grande Prairie.

== Toponymy ==
Bad Heart is named after the nearby Bad Heart River. The river's name, in turn, derives from a literal translation of the Cree words maatsiti ("wicked" or "bad heart") and missipi ("river").

== History ==
=== Founding and early development: 1919–1929 ===
Permanent settlement began in the area that became Bad Heart in 1919, after the federal government established the Soldier Settlement Board to provide land to returning veterans of the First World War.

The community developed slowly, owing to the site's unsuitability for arable farming. Plagued by dry weather and cut off from amenities by Bad Heart's remote location, some settlers foreclosed soon after arriving. Ranches and pastoral farms were more successful, sustaining the community's growth.

A log schoolhouse named Bad Heart School opened in 1928 to serve families in surrounding areas, followed by a post office in July 1929. Bad Heart School also functioned as a community hall that held dances and religious services.

=== Remaining 20th century: 1930–2000 ===
On May 4, 1944, a wildfire rapidly spread from Webster to Bad Heart that would become known as the Moose Hill Wildfire or Bad Heart River Fire. Low snowfall the previous winter, coupled with a scarcity of firefighters due to the Second World War, allowed the fire to spread 15,000 hectares.

Bad Heart was recognized as a settlement for federal mapping purposes on March 2, 1948.

In 1949, the Bad Heart School burned down. The school district was subsequently divided into North and South Bad Heart, with a school building moved from the nearby Odin District to serve as the North Bad Heart School. Local volunteers built South Bad Heart School, on land purchased from the Hudson's Bay Company.

Bad Heart's straw church, photographed 1954.

Few other amenities were established in Bad Heart by early 1954, when Roman Catholic priest and trained architect Francis Dales decided the settlement required its own place of worship. Until this point, Bad Heart's residents travelled to religious services held in nearby Teepee Creek. Owing to the relative poverty of Bad Heart's residents, Dales fundraised enough to construct a church made from rye straw. Construction of the Immaculate Heart Church, popularly known as the Bad Heart Straw Church, began and ended that summer.

Bad Heart School closed in 1955, when all local schools were consolidated at Teepee Creek. The straw church ceased operations in 1960, six years after opening. In 1968, Bad Heart's post office also permanently closed.

The locality's straw church was refurbished in 1985.

=== 21st century: 2001–present ===
The Bad Heart Straw Church was recognized as a provincial historic site by the Government of Alberta in 2009, then designated a municipal historic resource by Grande Prairie County the following year.

In June 2024, Grande Prairie County considered classifying Bad Heart itself as a "rural or historical settlement" that could eventually be marked by a commemorative plaque. The county's 2026 municipal development plan affirmed that Bad Heart is not expected to grow; the plan designated the area as a rural and agricultural settlement. Bad Heart's name is also used by the county to refer to surrounding unincorporated communities and their residents.
