= Redwillow River =

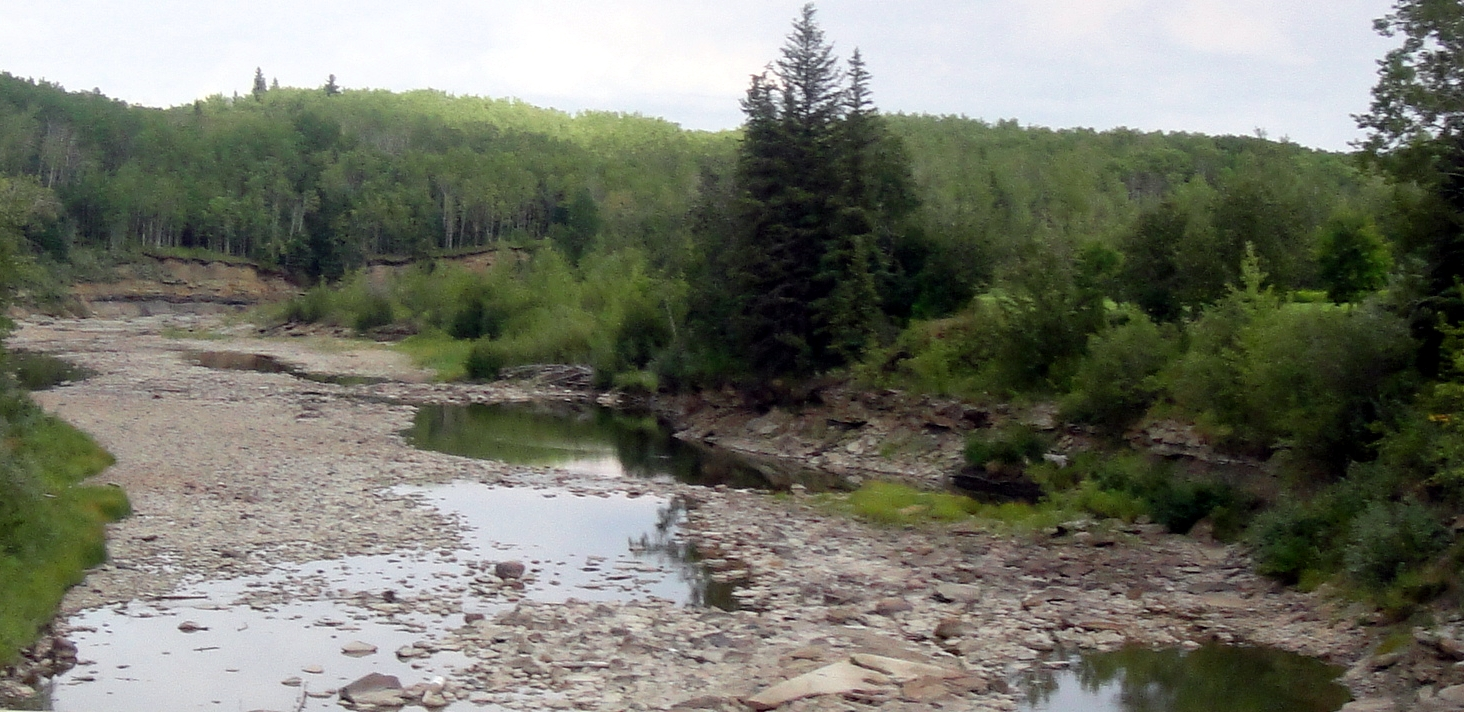

Location
- Country: Canada

Physical characteristics
- Source
  - location: Stony Lake
  - coordinates: 54.83535°N 120.55419°W
  - elevation: 1,080 meters (3,540 ft)
- Mouth
  - location: Wapiti River
  - coordinates: 55.03078°N 119.30938°W
  - elevation: 575 meters (1,886 ft)

The Redwillow River is a tributary of the Wapiti River in northern Alberta and north-eastern British Columbia, Canada. It flows through the Pouce Coupe Prairie, in the south of Peace River Country.

== Course ==
The Redwillow River forms in north-eastern British Columbia as an outflow of Stony Lake, in the Rocky Mountain Foothills, north of Yoho Mountain and south of Lone Mountain, at an elevation of 1,080 meters (3,540 ft). A campground is established on the shore of Stony lake immediately west of the river origin, and is accessible through local roads south of the Heritage Highway.

It flows east between Lone Mountain and Squaw Mountain, where it receives the waters from Rat Lake and other mountainside creeks. South Redwillow River is a right tributary that also brings water from Quicksand Lake. After draining Little Prairie Lakes, it continues east and receives water from Thunder Creek and Hiding Creek.

The Redwillow River becomes meandered as it progresses east and north-east into the province of Alberta. It continues through prairie land and receives water from Lattice Creek and further east from Diamond Dick Creek as it passes between the communities of Rio Grande, Sylvester and Elmworth. South of Beaverlodge it receives the waters of Beaverlodge River, then flows into the Wapiti River, at an elevation of 575 meters (1,886 ft), 83 kilometers (52 mi) east of its origin.

== Tributaries ==
In British Columbia

- Rat Lake
- South Redwillow River
- Little Prairie Lakes
- Thunder Creek
- Hiding Creek

In Alberta

- Lattice Creek
- Diamond Dick Creek
- Beaverlodge River

== See also ==
- List of rivers of British Columbia
- List of rivers of Alberta
