= Albright, Alberta =

Locality in Alberta, Canada

Coordinates: 55°15′57″N 119°29′50″W

Location of Albright in Alberta

Albright, Alberta is an unincorporated locality within northwest Alberta, Canada within the County of Grande Prairie No. 1. It is located on Highway 43 and the Grande Prairie-Grande Cache Railway between Beaverlodge and Hythe. It has an elevation 740 meters (2,430 ft).

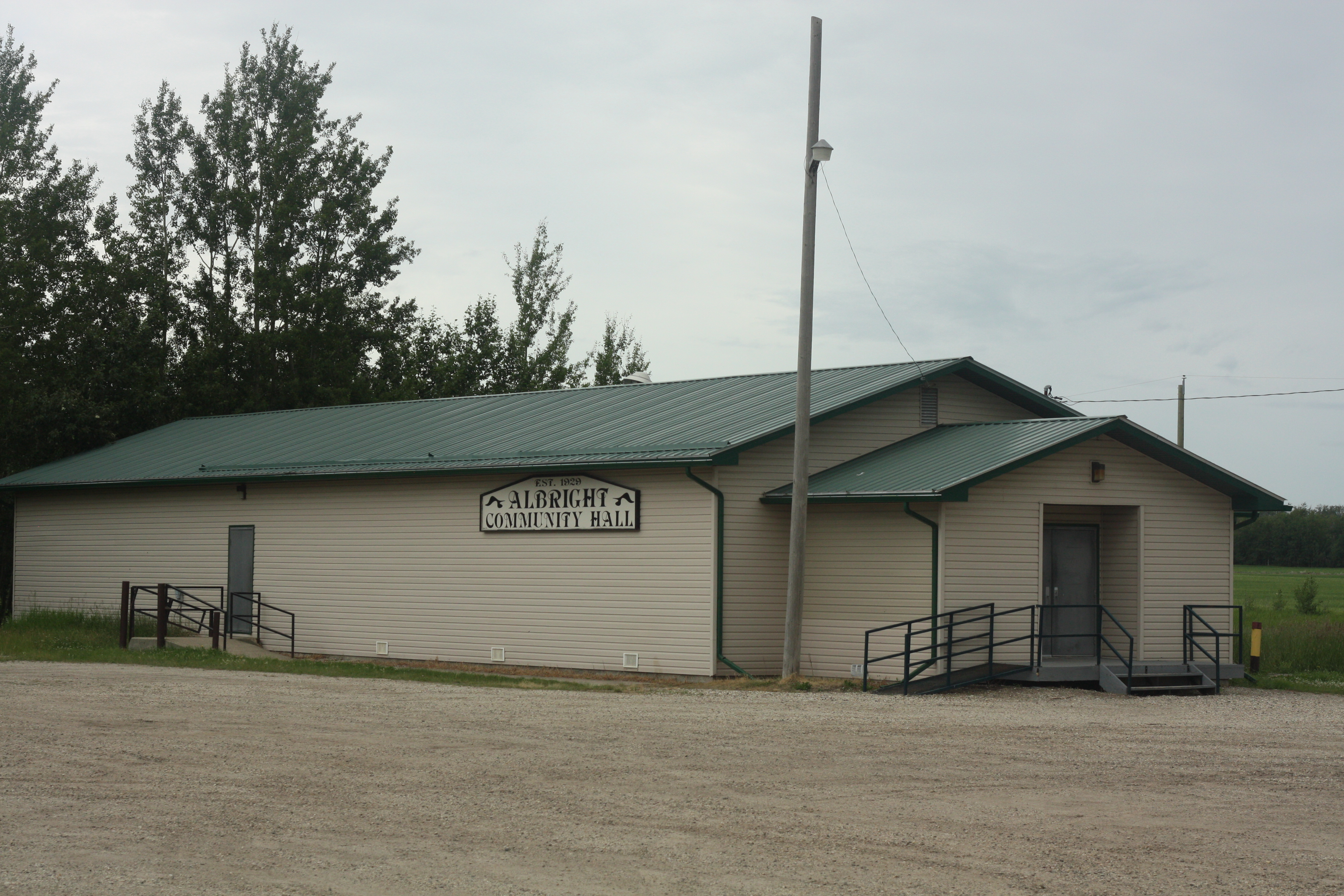
Albright Community Hall.

It was named after W.D. Albright (1881–1946), who was a proponent of agriculture in the Peace River Country and the founder of the Beaverlodge Dominion Experimental Farm (1917). Along the railway at this siding was the NAR railway station and the Alberta Pacific Grain elevator. The Albright Store soon opened across the road, followed by establishment of the Albright Post Office within the store in 1929. This was first named Hommy (after an early settler) but changed to Albright in 1931. Just west of the railway siding was the one-room Gimle School, built in 1919. The school was also home to Gimle Lutheran Church and served as the community hall until the Albright Hall was built beside the store in 1929. South of the railway siding was the Beisel Dairy and the Albright ball diamonds. Albright also had a United Church, Ladies Aid Society and Literary Society. The post office, store and school closed in the 1950s while the railway station closed in the 1970s. Around 1988, the grain elevator was replaced by a cement structure, and the original moved to the South Peace Centennial Museum. The cement Viterra grain elevator, the Albright Community Hall, and two cemeteries—Gimle and Riverside—continue to mark the existence of Albright, Alberta.
