= Hayfield, Alberta =

Hayfield, also known as Leighmore, is a locality in northern Alberta, Canada within the County of Grande Prairie No. 1. It is approximately 52 km (32 mi) west of Grande Prairie. the locality was formed around the Leighmore post office established July 1, 1922 in the home of George James Beadle on the SW quarter of section 10, township 71, range 11, west of the 6th meridian. It was named after post master Beadle's former home in the Channel Islands, the Barnardo Boys Home at Teighmore Park on the Island of Jersey. The name was misspelled, and recorded as Leighmore. In 1934, Hayfield School District 4661 was formed for the children of the area, as their former schools at Appleton and Rio Grande were becoming overcrowded. The post office closed in 1947, and the school in 1950. Information on people who lived in the Leighmore district can be found in the book "Beaverlodge to the Rockies", by Earl C. Stacey.
