= Travis Toews =

Canadian politician

The Honourable Travis Toews ECA
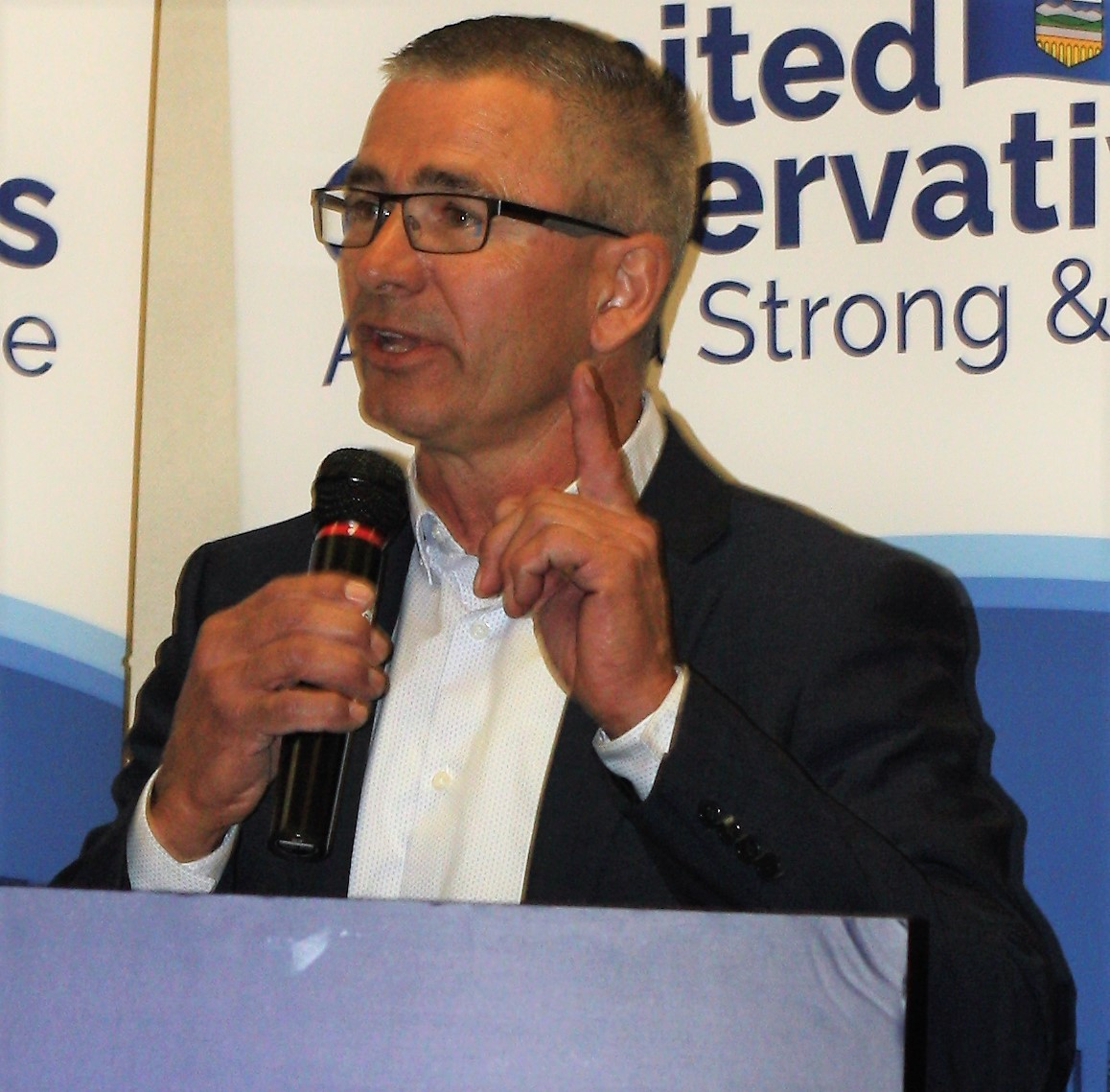

Minister of Finance of Alberta President of the Treasury Board
- In office October 24, 2022 – May 29, 2023
- Premier: Danielle Smith
- Preceded by: Jason Nixon
- Succeeded by: Nate Horner
- In office April 30, 2019 – May 31, 2022
- Premier: Jason Kenney
- Preceded by: Joe Ceci
- Succeeded by: Jason Nixon

Member of the Legislative Assembly of Alberta for Grande Prairie Wapiti
- In office April 16, 2019 – May 29, 2023
- Preceded by: Wayne Drysdale
- Succeeded by: Ron Wiebe

Personal details
- Born: November 15, 1964 (age 61) Beaverlodge, Alberta, Canada
- Party: United Conservative
- Education: Northern Alberta Institute of Technology
- Occupation: Accountant, rancher, business owner
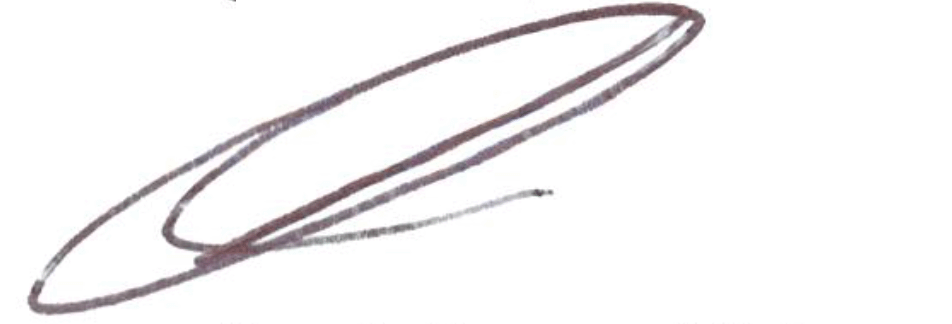
- Signature
- Website: www.toewsforalberta.ca

Travis Toews ECA (born 1964) is a Canadian politician elected in the 2019 Alberta general election to represent the electoral district of Grande Prairie-Wapiti in the 30th Alberta Legislature. He was appointed as Minister of Finance of Alberta and President of the Treasury Board on April 30, 2019, by Alberta Premier Jason Kenney.

On June 4, 2022, Toews resigned as the minister of finance and announced his candidacy in the 2022 United Conservative Party leadership election, where he placed second to Danielle Smith. Toews was reappointed as minister by premier Danielle Smith on October 24, 2022.

== Education ==
Toews attended the University of Alberta. He then attained a professional accounting designation through the society of management accountants and holds Certified Management Accountants of Canada (CMA) and Chartered Professional Accountant (CPA) accounting designations.

== Career ==
Toews spent twelve years working in a public accounting practice prior to pursuing business interests. After retiring from public accounting practice, Toews invested in, managed and grew a corporate family cattle ranching operation as well as an oilfield environmental company. Toews has served as a Director on a number of local non-profit boards, as well as provincial and national industry boards and committees including the Alberta Beef Producers and the Canadian Agri-Food Trade Alliance. He served as President of the Canadian Cattlemen's Association from 2010 to 2012. Toews co-chaired the Agri-Innovators Committee for then federal Agriculture Minister Gerry Ritz. In 2013, Ritz appointed Toews as a Canadian representative on the Asia Pacific Economic Cooperation (APEC) committee designed to improve international food security between APEC countries. Between 2010 and 2012, Toews served as a member of Country of Origin Labelling Canadian World Trade Organization Legal working group in Geneva, Switzerland.

== Minister of Finance ==
On April 30, 2019, Alberta Premier Jason Kenney appointed Toews as Minister of Finance of Alberta and President of the Treasury Board. Toews succeeds Calgary-Buffalo MLA Joe Ceci as Minister of Finance.

On 24 March 2023, he announced that he would not be seeking re election as an MLA. He was succeeded in the 2023 Alberta general election by Ron Wiebe from the UCP.

== 2022 UCP leadership election ==
On May 30, 2022, Toews registered his candidacy to replace Jason Kenney as UCP Leader with Elections Alberta. At the time of his registration he had not publicly declared his intention to run.

On June 4, 2022, Toews launched his campaign with twenty-three caucus endorsements. On October 6, 2022, Danielle Smith won the UCP leadership election defeating six other candidates as determined by instant-runoff voting. On the sixth ballot she was declared the winner taking 53 per cent of the vote, defeating Toews who had 46 per cent.

== Electoral history ==
Candidate	Round 1		Round 2		Round 3		Round 4		Round 5		Round 6	
Candidate	Votes	%	Votes	%	Votes	%	Votes	%	Votes	%	Votes	%
Danielle Smith	34,949	41.3	34,981	41.4	35,095	41.7	38,496	46.2	39,270	47.7	42,423	53.77
Travis Toews	24,831	29.4	25,054	29.7	25,593	30.4	26,592	31.9	30,794	37.4	36,480	46.23
Brian Jean	9,301	11.1	9,504	11.3	10,157	12.1	11,251	13.5	12,203	14.8	Eliminated	
Rebecca Schulz	5,835	6.9	6,180	7.3	6,784	8.0	6,972	8.4	Eliminated			
Todd Loewen	6,496	7.7	6,512	7.7	6,596	7.8	Eliminated					
Rajan Sawhney	1,787	2.1	2,246	2.7	Eliminated							
Leela Aheer	1,394	1.6	Eliminated									
Total	84,593	100.00	84,405	100.00	84,225	100.00	83,3177	100.00	82,267	100.00	78,903	100.00

2019 Alberta general election: Grande Prairie-Wapiti
Party	Candidate	Votes	%
United Conservative	Travis Toews	17,772	74.8
New Democratic	Shannon Dunfield	3,523	14.8
Alberta Party	Jason Jones	2,227	9.4
Independent	Terry Dueck	222	0.9
Total valid votes		23,744	
Rejected, spoiled, and declined		193	
Registered electors		29,757	
Turnout		80.2	

Alberta provincial government of Jason Kenney
Cabinet post (1)
Predecessor	Office	Successor
Joe Ceci	Minister of Finance & President of the Treasury Board; April 30, 2019–	Incumbent
