= Red Willow =

Red Willow or Redwillow may refer to:

== Trees ==
- Cornus amomum
- Cornus sericea
- Salix laevigata

== Other uses ==
- Red Willow, Alberta
- Red Willow County, Nebraska
- Red Willow Creek
- Redwillow River
- Red Willow Vineyard
