= Woodland Acres =

Woodland Acres may refer to:

- Woodland Acres, Grande Prairie County No. 1, Alberta
- Woodland Acres, Parkland County, Alberta
- Woodland Acres, Ontario, in Selwyn
