= Hilltop Estates, Alberta =

Hilltop Estates, Alberta may refer to:

- Hilltop Estates, Leduc County, Alberta, a locality in Leduc County, Alberta
- Hilltop Estates, Grande Prairie County No. 1, Alberta, a locality in Grande Prairie County No. 1, Alberta
