= Brainard, Alberta =

Brainard is a locality in northern Alberta, Canada within the County of Grande Prairie No. 1. It is approximately 61 km (38 mi) northwest of Grande Prairie. The locality was originally established in 1919 and took the name of the first postmaster, Leo Brainard.

William Leroy "Leo" Brainard first came to southern Alberta in 1906 to continue his successful career as a rancher. However, he arrived in time for the infamous winter of 1906-1907, during which many ranchers in southern Alberta lost much of their stock due to the severe blizzards. Leo Brainard was no exception. Not only did he lose his livelihood, he lost his son during one of the blizzards. He returned to Canada in 1918 and settled in the Hythe area.

The "Stopping Place" was located on the main road, on the south-east side of Sinclair Lake, between Grande Prairie and Pouce Coupe. Many travelers, some famous (Sir Henry Thornton, Lord and Lady Bessborough), stopped for Ma Brainard's famous chicken dinners. Sinclair Lake was officially changed to Brainard Lake in 1991 to reflect common usage in the local area. The Stopping Place was used as a post office from 1919-12-01 to 1961-08-16. Sinclair Lake School held its first classes in September 1929. The school was closed in 1951 centralizing to Goodfare, Alberta.
