= Niobe, Alberta =

Niobe, Alberta may refer to:

- Niobe, Red Deer County, Alberta, a locality in Red Deer County, Alberta
- Niobe, Grande Prairie County No. 1, Alberta, a locality in Grande Prairie County No. 1, Alberta
