= Mount Valley, Alberta =

Locality in Alberta, Canada

Mount Valley is a locality in northern Alberta, Canada within the County of Grande Prairie No. 1. It is approximately 54 km (34 mi) southwest of Grande Prairie.

The locality is centered on the Mount Valley Store which was established by Colonel Lyle Tennyson and Cephas Tennyson of Beaverlodge, Alberta in 1930. The name is descriptive, as the location of the store was in a valley near the mountains.

In January 1932, West End School District 4592 was organized and a log school on a stone foundation was built two miles west of the store. On January 8, 1938, the Mount Valley Post Office was added to the store, now owned by the Elliott family. The postmistress was Elva Elliott Lingrell, a daughter of the family.

The school closed in 1935 and the store and post office burned down in 1951. The closing date for the post office was September 16, 1951.
