= Gundy, Alberta =

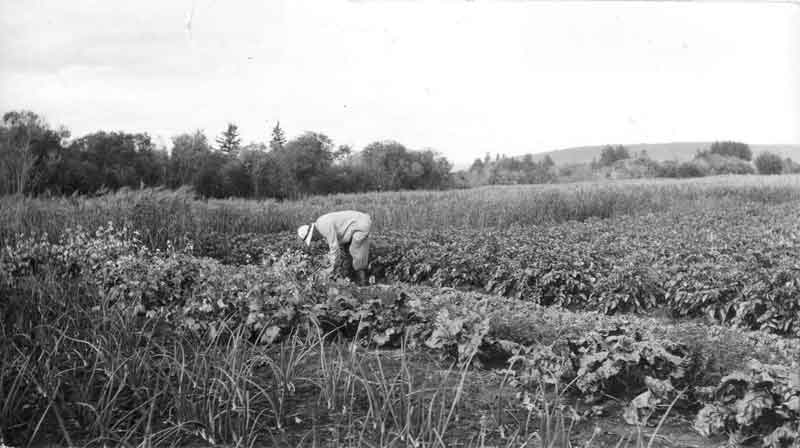
Garden near Gundy, Alberta circa 1911

Gundy is a locality in northern Alberta, Canada within the County of Grande Prairie No. 1 near the British Columbia-Alberta border northeast of Dawson Creek. It was named after H.W. Gundy, a partner in the Toronto real estate firm, Gundy & Gundy, who, in 1915, purchased 35,000 acres of land in the area with the view of selling it to incoming settlers on January 10, 1916. With plenty of land available by homestead grant, there were no buyers for Gundy’s remote scheme, so in 1922 they formed the Tate Creek Cattle Company, better known as the Gundy Ranch. They brought in 1000 head of cattle but lost 900 head the first winter. They then sold all but the land and the buildings. In the stock market crash of 1929, Gundy’s fortune was lost, and any profit from the ranch was retained by the manager of the ranch, whom they were no longer able to pay. About this same time, land north and east of the ranch was opened for homesteading, and in 1932 the Gundy Post Office was established in the home of James Kellar on the B.C. side of the border. In 1936, the Gundy Church was built (also in B.C.), but the Gundy Cemetery on the lot east of the church, was laid out in Alberta. The Gundy Ranch land was eventually acquired by the Canadian Colonization Association, a division of the Department of Immigration and Colonization of the Canadian Pacific Railway Company, and in 1939 about 500 Sudetens were settled there. The Sudetens were opposed to Hitler and the Nazi government, and had fled after Germany invaded Sudetenland.

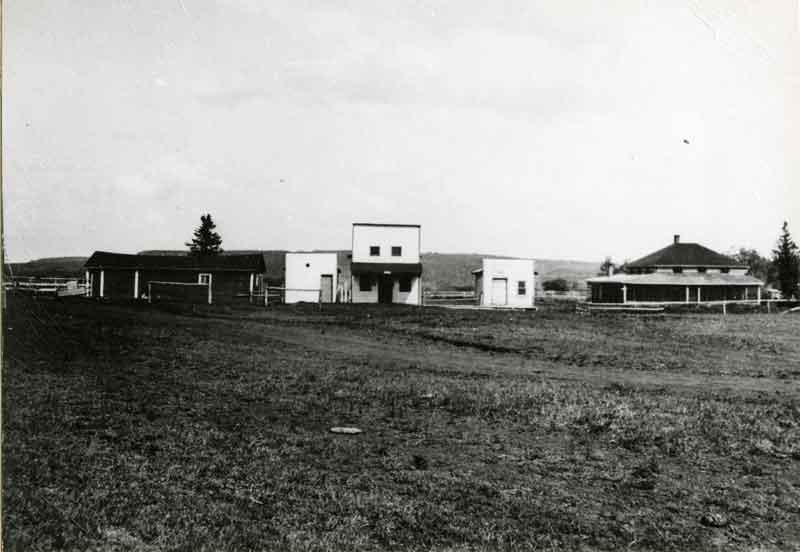
Swan Lake Stopping Place close to Gundy, Alberta circa 1920
