= Halcourt, Alberta =

Halcourt
- Hamlet
- Location of Halcourt in the County of Grande Prairie No. 1 Halcourt (Alberta)
- Coordinates: 55.112321°N 119.523415°W
- Country: Canada
- Province: Alberta
- Region: Northern Alberta
- Census division: No. 19
- Municipal district: County of Grande Prairie No. 1
- Settled: 1910
- Hamlet: June 3, 2024

Government
  - Type: Unincorporated
  - Reeve: Leanne Beaupre
  - Governing body: County of Grande Prairie No. 1 Council: Leanne Beaupre; Corey Beck; Daryl Beeston; Harold Bulford; Peter Harris; Bob Marshall; Karen Rosvold; Ross Sutherland; Linda Dianne Waddy

Area (2015)
  - Land: 1.80 km^{2} (0.69 sq mi)
- Time zone: UTC−06:00 (Alberta Time)

Halcourt is a hamlet in northern Alberta, Canada that is under the jurisdiction of the County of Grande Prairie No. 1. It is approximately 40 km (25 mi) west of Grande Prairie.

== History ==
It was named after Harry Halcourt Walker, an early settler who filed claim in April 1910 as the land was being surveyed for settlement. The first public building was the Halcourt Methodist Church, which opened in 1911. In 1912, Halcourt School District 2835 was formed and classes held in the church until a log school was built kitty-corner from the church in 1914. On May 15, 1913, a post office was established in Thomas Metcalf's home across the road east of the school on Section 33, township 70, range 10, west of the 6th meridian. This was the center of the community until 1917, when the school was moved two miles west to the intersection of ranges 10 and 11, and townships 70 and 71. This was where the community grew, with the addition of Funnell's Store, the District Nurse's Cottage, and Frank Keasis’ blacksmith shop in 1922. About the same time, a cemetery was laid out a half mile south of the church. In 1924, the Orangemen's Hall was built across the road from the school, and in 1938 a Curling Rink beside the hall. During the 1930s the residents created a Sports Ground two miles south on the banks of the Red Willow River. The community also boasted a tennis court, a Literary Society, and Funnell's Orchestra. After 45 years of operation, the school closed in 1957, but the building was retained as a hall operated by the Halcourt Ladies Club. The post office closed in 1962. (4) Today, the historic church and school, as well as the active cemetery mark are within the hamlet.

== See also ==
- List of hamlets in Alberta
