= Glen Leslie =

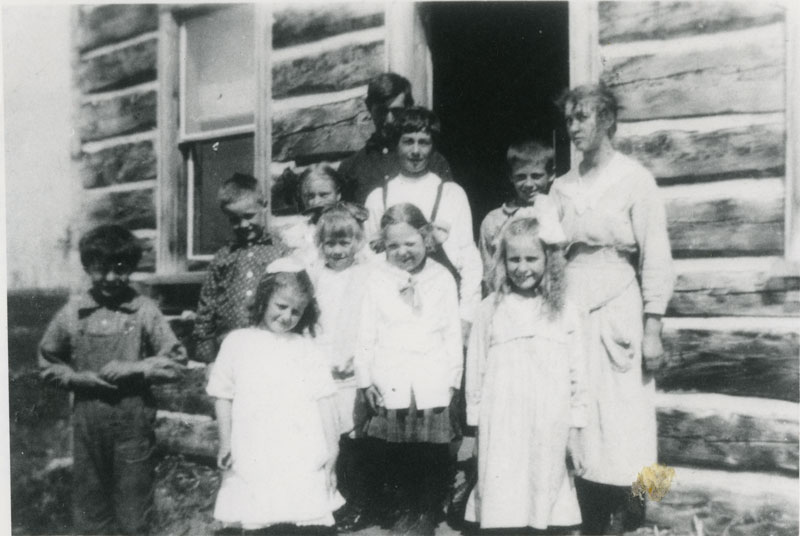
First class of students with teacher on the steps of Glen Leslie Church

Glen Leslie, Alberta is an unincorporated locality in northwest Alberta, Canada within the County of Grande Prairie No. 1. It is approximately 20 km (12 mi) east of Grande Prairie, south of Highway 43 on Highway 670.

Originally established as a post office, it was named after the Thomas Leslie family.

In 1912, Tom Leslie, his sons and three other men traveled with horse and wagon from Edmonton, over the Edson trail, to Bezanson to file homesteads in the district. The Leslie home became the Glen Leslie store and post office July 1, 1914. The postmaster was Thomas Leslie. The home also became a stopping place for travelers and for church services.

In 1915, a log church was built a mile east of the post office. Work was completed that fall and on October 30, the first service took place in what became known as the Glen Leslie Presbyterian Church. It was restored as a provincial historic site and celebrated its 100th anniversary in 2015.

The Somme School District was organized in 1915, and classes were held in the log church until Somme School was built in 1930. Somme school closed under consolidation in 1956.
