= Hazelmere, Alberta =

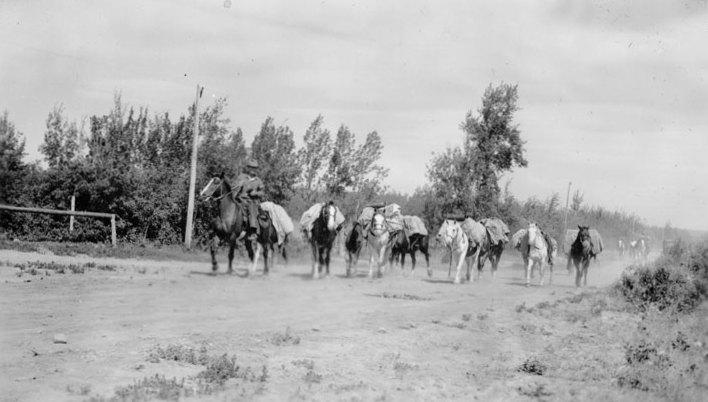
Pack Horse Train Leaving Hazelmere for Monkman Pass

Hazelmere is a locality in northwest Alberta, Canada within the County of Grande Prairie No. 1. It is located between the Red Willow River and Diamond Dick Creek, approximately 75 km (47 mi) southwest of Grande Prairie.

Hazelmere was mainly settled through the process of homesteading in the 1920s by newcomers to the Peace River Country, and by neighbours from adjoining rural areas who needed more land. In 1920, Beaverbrook School District 3979 was organized and a one-room log school built on the northwest quarter of section 11, township 70, range 12, west of the sixth meridian. The second building was Hazelmere's post office, established in 1930 in the home of Herbert and Louise Jordan one mile south of the school. Mr. Jordan named the post office after a town in England near where he had been stationed at the Canadian training camp in Bramshott during World War I. When he opened the Hazelmere General Store in 1935, the post office was moved into the store, which was located in the same yard as their home. Under consolidation of one-rooms schools in the County of Grande Prairie, Beaverbrook School closed in 1952, centralizing to the Elmworth School District. Hazelmere's post office closed on August 7, 1964 when the Jordan family left the area.
