= Ministry of Gaming (Alberta) =

The logo of the Alberta Lottery Fund

The Ministry of Gaming was a Cabinet-level agency of the government of the Canadian province of Alberta that handled policy and legislation relating to liquor and gambling. The agency had three main divisions, the Department of Gaming, the Alberta Gaming Research Council, and the Alberta Gaming and Liquor Commission. It had oversight of the Alberta Lottery Fund, and it was responsible for the Horse Racing Alberta Act and Racing Appeal Tribunal.

The last Minister of Gaming was Gordon Graydon. The Ministry was first created in 1999, although one of its components had then been the Community Lottery Program Secretariat. In December 2006, Premier Ed Stelmach abolished the Ministry of Gaming and folded it into other agencies in an effort to trim down government. At that time the Alberta Gaming and Liquor Commission moved under The Ministry of Solicitor General and Public Security.

The Alberta Gaming Research Council, created on August 24, 1999, guided the activities of the Alberta Gaming Research Institute. Council members were appointed for a three-year term. The Alberta Gaming Research Institute still exists as a joint venture of the University of Alberta, the University of Calgary, and the University of Lethbridge. It studies the positive and negative effects of gaming, trends, and matters relating to aboriginal gaming. Its $1.5 million annual budget is reliant upon the Alberta Lottery Fund.

The Alberta Gaming and Liquor Commission, abbreviated AGLC, became a part of the Ministry of Gaming on May 25, 1999. It was composed of a Corporation and a Board, which was charged with establishing policy, reviewing and approving liquor and gaming licenses and registrations, and conducting hearings into violations of legislation and matters relating to licenses and registrations. The Commission also enforced aspects of the Tobacco Tax Act with the Tobacco Enforcement Unit of the Commission's Investigations Branch.

Under the jurisdiction of the Commission was also the Alberta Lottery Fund, composed of the government's $1 billion annual share of revenue from Video Lottery Terminals, ticket lotteries, and slot machines. The Alberta Lottery Fund was originally established in 1987 by Bill 10. In addition to funding the Alberta Gaming Research Council, it also fully funded the Alberta Alcohol and Drug Abuse Commission. A grand total of $1,207,533,000 came from the fund as the estimate of 2005/2006.
