= Gordon Graydon (Alberta politician) =

Canadian politician (1942–2024)

The Honourable Gordon Graydon ECA

MLA for Grande Prairie-Wapiti
- In office March 12, 2001 – March 3, 2008
- Preceded by: Wayne Jacques
- Succeeded by: Wayne Drysdale

Alderman for Grande Prairie City Council
- In office October 17, 1983 – October 22, 1992

Mayor of Grande Prairie
- In office October 22, 1992 – 2001
- Preceded by: Dwight Logan
- Succeeded by: Wayne Ayling

Personal details
- Born: September 19, 1942 Lacombe, Alberta, Canada
- Died: December 7, 2024 (aged 82) Grande Prairie, Alberta, Canada
- Party: Progressive Conservative
- Spouse: Anne Graydon
- Children: 4

Hon. Gordon John Graydon ECA (September 19, 1942 – December 7, 2024) was a Canadian politician and former member of Grande Prairie City Council and the Legislative Assembly of Alberta. He served on Grande Prairie City Council for 18 years including as Mayor from 1992 to 2001. Following his term as Mayor, Gordon represented the electoral district of Grande Prairie-Wapiti as a Progressive Conservative from the 2001 election until the 2008 election, in which he did not seek re-election. He was Alberta's last Gaming Minister. Graydon died on December 7, 2024, at the age of 82.
