= Dimsdale, Alberta =

Dimsdale
- Hamlet
- Location of Dimsdale Dimsdale (Canada)
- Coordinates: 55°08′38″N 118°59′24″W
- Country: Canada
- Province: Alberta
- Region: Northern Alberta
- Census division: 19
- Municipal district: County of Grande Prairie No. 1

Government
  - Type: Unincorporated
  - Governing body: County of Grande Prairie No. 1 Council

Population (1981)
  - Total: 25
- Time zone: UTC−06:00 (Alberta Time)
- Area codes: 780, 587, 825

Dimsdale is a hamlet in northern Alberta, Canada within the County of Grande Prairie No. 1. It was established on March 30 of 2001 and is located 2 kilometres (1.2 mi) south of Highway 43, approximately 13 kilometres (8.1 mi) west of Grande Prairie.

The hamlet was named after Henry George Wadsworth Dimsdale, a construction engineer on the extension of the Edmonton, Dunvegan and British Columbia Railway.

== Demographics ==
Dimsdale recorded a population of 25 in the 1981 Census of Population conducted by Statistics Canada.

== See also ==
- List of communities in Alberta
- List of hamlets in Alberta
