= Buffalo Lake, Alberta =

Buffalo Lake
- Hamlet
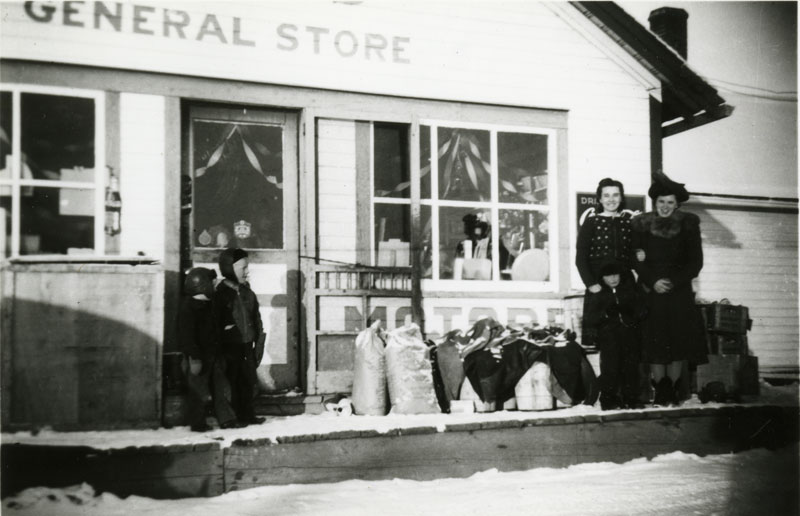
- Girls smiling while child looks on in front of Buffalo Lake General Store

- Location of Buffalo Lake in the County of Grande Prairie No. 1 Buffalo Lake (Alberta)
- Coordinates: 55.112321°N 119.523415°W
- Country: Canada
- Province: Alberta
- Region: Northern Alberta
- Census division: No. 19
- Municipal district: County of Grande Prairie No. 1
- Settled: 1913

Government
  - Type: Unincorporated
  - Reeve: Leanne Beaupre
  - Governing body: County of Grande Prairie No. 1 Council: Leanne Beaupre; Corey Beck; Daryl Beeston; Harold Bulford; Peter Harris; Bob Marshall; Karen Rosvold; Ross Sutherland; Linda Dianne Waddy
- Time zone: UTC−06:00 (Alberta Time)

Buffalo Lake or Buffalo Lakes is a hamlet in northwest Alberta, Canada that is under the jurisdiction of the County of Grande Prairie No. 1. It is located approximately 22 km (14 mi) northwest of Grande Prairie. The locality is on Highway 59 within proximity of Buffalo Lake, for which it is named. Buffalo Lake is one of a group of lakes referred to as Buffalo Lakes (other lakes named are Jones Lake and Gummer Lake). Bison were known to use the lakes as a watering hole and to wallow in the shallow waters as a respite from heat and insects. Many buffalo skulls were found in the area by early settlers.

The first public building in Buffalo Lake was the Anglican Church, built in 1913. In 1918, the United Farmers of Alberta Hall was built a half-mile east of the church. In 1917, the Buffalo Lake post office was established. Businesses in the community included a blacksmith shop, a livery stable, a café and two garages. A curling rink was built in the mid-1930s across the road west of the store. The present hall was built in about 1950. Buffalo Lakes School District was established in 1914.

The post office closed in 1952. The hall closed circa 2010, but the building remains on site.

== See also ==
- List of hamlets in Alberta
