= Ron Wiebe =

Canadian politician from Alberta

Ron Wiebe MLA

Member of the Legislative Assembly of Alberta for Grande Prairie-Wapiti
- Incumbent
- Assumed office May 29, 2023
- Preceded by: Travis Toews

Personal details
- Party: UCP

Ron Wiebe is a Canadian politician from the United Conservative Party. He was elected as a Member of the Legislative Assembly of Alberta for Grande Prairie-Wapiti in the 2023 Alberta general election.

Wiebe's professional career was in the transport industry as the founder of Wiebe Transport. He also served on the Northwestern Polytechnic Board of Governors and as a municipal councillor for Mackenzie County, Alberta.

== Electoral history ==
=== 2023 general election ===
2023 Alberta general election: Grande Prairie-Wapiti
Party	Candidate	Votes	%	±%
United Conservative	Ron Wiebe	15,093	76.22	+1.38
New Democratic	Dustin Archibald	4,063	20.52	+5.68
Alberta Independence	Brooklyn Biegel	645	3.26	–
Total		19,801	99.66	–
Rejected and declined		68	0.34	
Turnout		19,869	54.52	
Eligible voters		36,444		
United Conservative hold		Swing		-2.15
Source(s) Source: Elections Alberta
