= Fitzsimmons, Alberta =

Locality in Alberta, Canada

Fitzsimmons is an unincorporated locality in northwest Alberta, Canada within the County of Grande Prairie No. 1. It is approximately 30 km (19 mi) northeast of Grande Prairie.

The locality of Fitzsimmons formed around the Fitzsimmons School District No. 4500 which was approved July 7, 1930, for the area north of Bezanson and west of the Smoky River. It was named after a homesteader in the district, Scotty Fitzsimmons. Two years later, a post office was established in the home of C. Milnar on the NW quarter of Township 73, Range 3, West of the 6th Meridian. The one-room school closed in 1956 and the students were bussed to the school at Bezanson. In 1951, the post office also closed and there are no public buildings remaining to mark the locality of Fitzsimmons. Information on this community and the people who lived there can be found in Smoky River to Grande Prairie. (4)
