= Wayne Drysdale =

Canadian politician

The Honourable Wayne Drysdale ECA
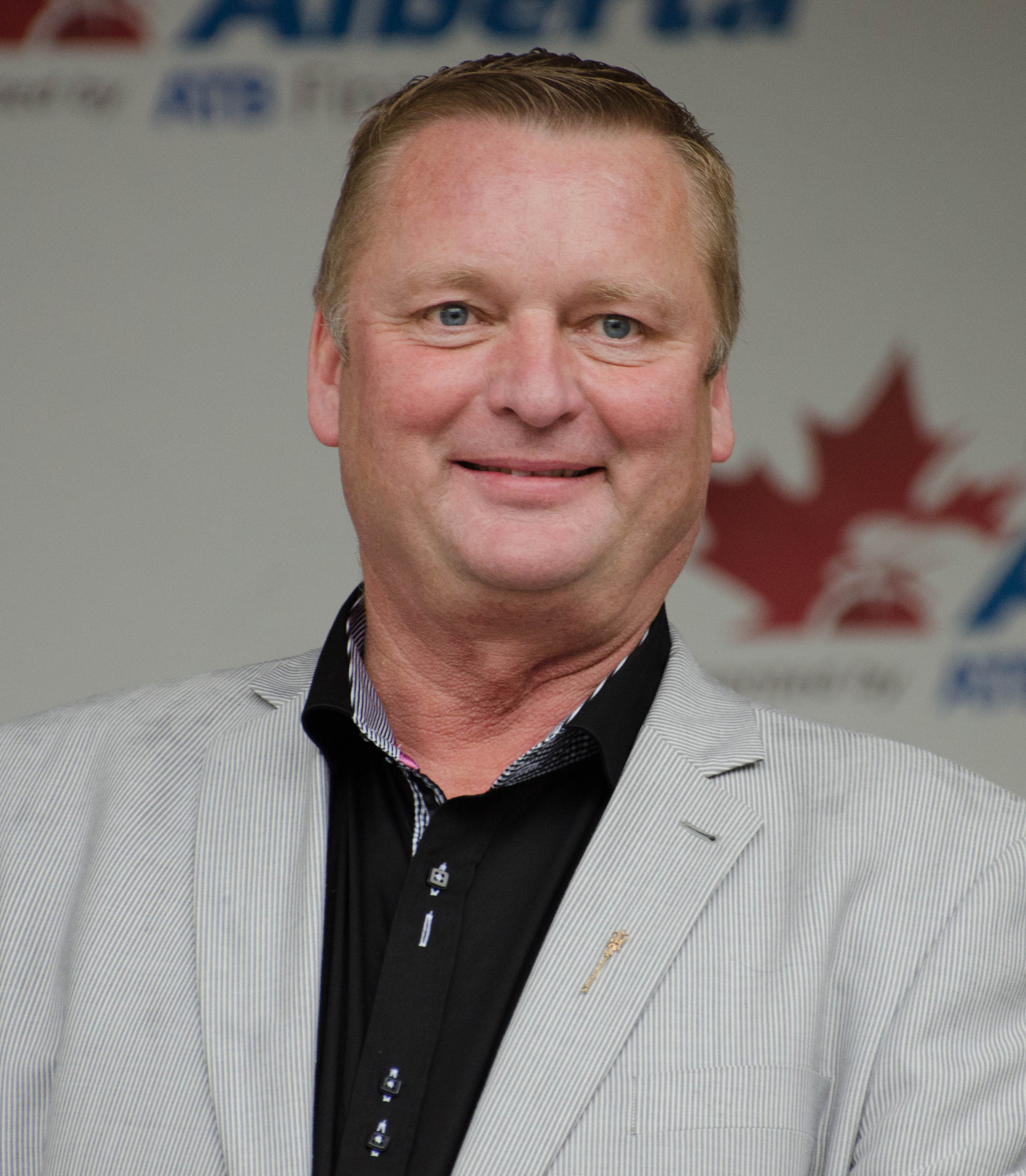
- Drysdale at the 2014 Tour of Alberta

Member of the Legislative Assembly of Alberta for Grande Prairie Wapiti
- In office March 3, 2008 – March 19, 2019
- Preceded by: Gordon Graydon
- Succeeded by: Travis Toews

Personal details
- Party: United Conservative

Wayne Ronald Drysdale ECA is a Canadian politician, who served as an Alberta MLA from 2008 to 2019. He is a member of the Progressive Conservatives. He was Minister of Transportation in the cabinet of Jim Prentice.

He was elected in the 2008 provincial election to represent the electoral district of Grande Prairie Wapiti in the Legislative Assembly of Alberta and re-elected there in 2012 and 2015.

He did not seek re-election in 2019.

== Election results ==
2008 Alberta general election: Grande Prairie-Wapiti
Party	Candidate	Votes	%	±%
Progressive Conservative	Wayne Drysdale	5,145	66.70%	+11.63%
Liberal	Augustine Ebinu	1,304	16.90%	-4.40%
New Democratic	Manuela Campbell	829	10.75%	-1.55%
Greens	Allan Webber	436	5.65%	+1.24%
Total		7,714	100.00%	
Rejected, spoiled and declined		74		
Eligible electors / turnout		29,053	26.81%	-9.77%
Progressive Conservative hold		Swing		+8.02%
Source(s) The Report on the March 3, 2008 Provincial General Election of the Twenty-seventh Legislative Assembly. Elections Alberta. July 28, 2008. pp. 430–433.

2012 Alberta general election: Grande Prairie-Wapiti
Party	Candidate	Votes	%	±%
Progressive Conservative	Wayne Drysdale	6,712	51.63%	-15.07%
Wildrose	Ethane Jarvis	4,509	34.68%	
New Democratic	Paula Anderson	1,209	9.30%	-1.38%
Liberal	Alya Nazarali	365	2.81%	-14.09%
Independent	Anthony Barendregt	204	1.57%	
Total valid votes		12,999	100.00%	
Rejected, spoiled, and declined		96		
Eligible electors / Turnout		30,764	42.57%	+15.76%
Progressive Conservative hold		Swing		-24.89%
Source(s) "Grande Prairie-Wapiti".

2015 Alberta general election: Grande Prairie-Wapiti
Party	Candidate	Votes	%	±%
Progressive Conservative	Wayne Drysdale	6,229	35.57	-16.06
New Democratic	Mary Dahr	5,062	28.90	+19.60
Wildrose	Laila Goodridge	4,175	23.84	-10.84
Alberta Party	Rory Tarant	2,048	11.69	
Total		17,514	100.00	
Rejected, spoiled, and declined		77		
Eligible electors / turnout		37,445	46.98	+4.41
Progressive Conservative hold		Swing		-17.55
Source(s) "Grande Prairie-Wapiti".
