= Huallen =

- Hamlet
- Location of Huallen Huallen (Canada)
- Coordinates: 55°09′52″N 119°17′11″W
- Country: Canada
- Province: Alberta
- Region: Northern Alberta
- Census division: 19
- Municipal district: County of Grande Prairie No. 1

Government
  - Type: Unincorporated
  - Governing body: County of Grande Prairie No. 1 Council

Population (1991)
  - Total: 28
- Time zone: UTC−06:00 (Alberta Time)
- Area codes: 780, 587, 825

Huallen is a hamlet in northern Alberta, Canada, within the County of Grande Prairie No. 1. It is located on Highway 43, approximately 35 kilometres (22 mi) west of Grande Prairie.

== Toponymy ==
Huallen is named after local farmer and provincial politician Hugh Allen, who represented the electoral district of Peace River.

== Topography ==
Huallen's landscape is characterized by gently rolling land and Solonetzic clay loam soil.

== History ==
=== Pre-settlement ===
Archaeological evidence of lithic tools and bison bones indicates that Indigenous peoples traditionally hunted in the Huallen area.

=== Establishment: 1909–1929 ===
Settlement in the area began around 1909, but the site that became Huallen was first occupied by its future eponym Hugh Wright Allen in 1911, who established a farm there with his wife, Mable. Allen was elected to represent Peace River in 1926.

In 1929, the community received its name when Clara Clow opened a post office named Huallen after its most well-known resident. Later that year, the Edmonton, Dunvegan and British Columbia Railway established the Huallen railway station. Around this time, the settlement's population expanded with the arrival of German Lutheran families, who established St. John's Lutheran School and Church.

=== Remaining 20th century: 1930–2000 ===
The railway brought a period of growth to Huallen, which soon received two grain elevators and a cooperative livestock stockyard. A community hall was built in 1935, followed by a curling rink. The area received telephone services through the Lower Beaver Lodge Mutual Telephone Company in 1936.

Children received an education at the Lower Beaverlodge school, around 5 km from Huallen. The school also hosted the area's polling station for federal and municipal elections, and served as an occasional health clinic.

Lower Beaverlodge School closed in 1947, shortly before the introduction of improved transit and better roads in the 1950s began to erode Huallen's population. Although the provincial government recognized Huallen as a hamlet in 1951, residents slowly relocated to larger localities, culminating in the closures of St. John's Lutheran School in 1962 and Huallen's post office in June 1970. Huallen's grain elevators ceased operations in 1974, and its train station was removed some time after.

Although provincially recognized as a hamlet, Huallen was considered a rural settlement by the municipal County of Grande Prairie until 1998, when a municipal development plan similarly identified Huallen as a hamlet. Nonetheless, the county's land use bylaws continued to treat Huallen as a rural settlement.

=== 21st century: 2001–present ===
In December 2020, Richardson Pioneer announced plans to build a new Huallen grain elevator. Construction of the 45,000 tonne capacity facility was completed in 2021.

The County of Grande Prairie formally began considering reclassifying Huallen as a rural settlement in 2024. The area had previously been identified as a rural residential neighbourhood in 2017, which the county did not expect to grow.

== Services ==
Huallen is a primarily agricultural community with no retail businesses. Municipal services are limited, and residents rely upon private wells and septic tanks for water and sewage. The Canadian National Railway maintains the railroad through Huallen for freight services.

== Demographics ==
Huallen recorded a population of 28 in the 1991 Census of Population conducted by Statistics Canada.

The County of Grande Prairie estimates that Huallen's population stands at around 15 as of 2024.

== See also ==
- List of communities in Alberta
- List of hamlets in Alberta
