= Clairmont, Alberta =

Clairmont
- Hamlet
- Location of Clairmont in Alberta
- Coordinates: 55.2614°N 118.7936°W
- Country: Canada
- Province: Alberta
- Census division: No. 19
- Municipal district: County of Grande Prairie No. 1

Government
  - Type: Unincorporated
  - Reeve: Leanne Beaupre
  - Governing body: County of Grande Prairie No. 1 Council: Leanne Beaupre; Corey Beck; Daryl Beeston; Harold Bulford; Peter Harris; Bob Marshall; Karen Rosvold; Ross Sutherland; Linda Dianne Waddy

Population (2021)
  - Total: 5,135
- Time zone: UTC−06:00 (Alberta Time)

Clairmont is a hamlet in northern Alberta, Canada within the County of Grande Prairie No. 1. Previously an incorporated municipality, Clairmont dissolved from village status on January 1, 1946 to become part of the Municipal District of Bear Lake No. 740.

Clairmont is located in the Peace Country, along Highway 2, approximately 10 km (6.2 mi) north of Grande Prairie and 9 km (5.6 mi) south of Sexsmith.

Clairmont lies at an elevation of 685 m (2,247 ft), on the western shore of Clairmont Lake. Initially the area was commonly known as Twin Lakes. The first use of the name "Clairmont" was in 1907 by the earliest surveyor of the township boundaries, JB Saint Cyr.

== History ==
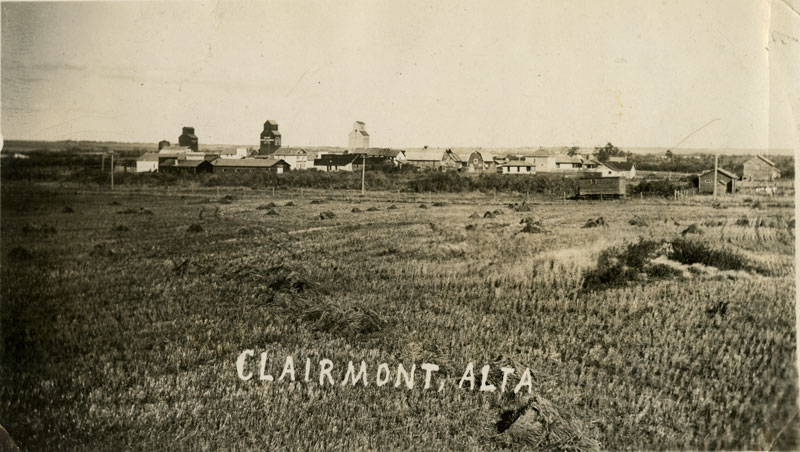
Clairmont circa 1917

Development of the townsite really got started once it was surveyed and after the arrival of the Edmonton, Dunvegan & British Columbia Railway in 1916. By the end of 1916, the townsite had a railway station, two or three grain elevators, an agent's house, the Buffalo Lakes Lumber Yard, Clairmont Hotel, a Union Bank, a butcher shop, several stores, a Baptist church, and a handful of residences. On September 10, 1915 the Clairmont Lake School District was opened. A post office was established in 1916. In 1922, a large fire consumed many Clairmont businesses, while a train station was built in 1923.

Clairmont was incorporated as a village in 1917, but renounced the village status in 1946 after a downturn in economy caused by the Great Depression. It eventually became the location of the County of Grande Prairie No. 1's municipal office.

A new school was built with municipal funding in 2007 and opened in 2008.

== Demographics ==
Population history of Clairmont
Year	Pop.	±%
1921	130	—
1926	75	−42.3%
1931	110	+46.7%
1936	104	−5.5%
1941	102	−1.9%
1951	71	−30.4%
1956	164	+131.0%
1961	292	+78.0%
1966	274	−6.2%
1971	309	+12.8%
1976	599	+93.9%
1981	852	+42.2%
1986	817	−4.1%
1991	864	+5.8%
1996	1,021	+18.2%
2001	1,481	+45.1%
2006	2,174	+46.8%
2016	4,274	+96.6%
2021	5,135	+20.1%
The 1981, 1986, and 1991 population counts are the sum of Clairmont and Clairmont Trailer Court. Source: Statistics Canada (2016 and 1921–2001) and County of Grande Prairie No. 1 (2006 and 2021)

The Hamlet of Clairmont had a population of 5,135 in the 2021 Census of Population.

== See also ==
- List of communities in Alberta
- List of former urban municipalities in Alberta
- List of hamlets in Alberta
