= Homestead, Alberta =

Coordinates: 55.51664°N 119.36948°W

Homestead is a locality in northern Alberta, Canada within the County of Grande Prairie No. 1. It is approximately 48 km (30 mi) northwest of Grande Prairie and wa, formed around the Homestead post office that was established November 1, 1930. The post office was in the home of Christian & Caroline Nordhagen, who also operated a small store.

The land around Homestead ad been opened for homesteading (hence the name) in 1929. A forest fire had ravaged the area, leaving a fine white ash over the land, so when the school district was established in 1930, it was named Ashdown. A log school was built on the NW quarter of section 20, township 75, range 9, west of the 6th meridian. This was the community centre for club meetings, concerts, dances and church services until 1949, when the Northern Lights Hall was built.

The school closed in 1956 and the post office in 1962. The vacant school was used as a United Church until it was sold in 1959, but in 2006, the Ashdown Historic Society was formed to preserve the site and the building.
