= Windsor Creek, Alberta =

Canadian locality

Windsor Creek is a locality in northern Alberta, Canada within the County of Grande Prairie No. 1. It is approximately 72 km (45 mi) west-southwest of Grande Prairie. It was named for its proximity to the creek of the same name and it had a post office dating to October 1929.
