= Smoky Heights, Alberta =

Smoky Heights is a locality in northern Alberta, Canada within the County of Grande Prairie No. 1. It is on the west bank of the Smoky River northeast of Grande Prairie. It was formed around the Smoky Heights post office, which was established June 1, 1923 in the home of Edith and Clarence Field. The post office lasted only a few years, in 1927 it was moved to Bezanson, but the area retained the name. On November 14, 1928, the Rivertop School District 4371 was approved. This school was much larger than the normal one-room school as it was intended to serve as a community center and included accommodations for the teacher as well. The school closed in 1955 and the students were bussed to the consolidated school at Teepee Creek.
