= Wedgewood, Alberta =

Wedgewood
- Hamlet
- Location of Wedgewood Wedgewood (Canada)
- Coordinates: 55°06′59″N 118°48′48″W
- Country: Canada
- Province: Alberta
- Region: Northern Alberta
- Census division: 19
- Municipal district: County of Grande Prairie No. 1

Government
  - Type: Unincorporated
  - Governing body: County of Grande Prairie No. 1 Council

Area (2021)
  - Land: 0.53 km^{2} (0.20 sq mi)

Population (2021)
  - Total: 752
  - Density: 1,428/km^{2} (3,700/sq mi)
- Time zone: UTC−06:00 (Alberta Time)
- Area codes: 780, 587, 825

Wedgewood is a hamlet in northern Alberta, Canada within the County of Grande Prairie No. 1.

It is immediately adjacent to the City of Grande Prairie on the west side of Resources Road (Range Road 60), approximately 2.4 kilometres (1.5 mi) east of Highway 40 and 0.8 kilometres (0.50 mi) north of Highway 668.

== Demographics ==
Population history of Wedgewood
Year	Pop.	±%
2011	755	—
2016	753	−0.3%
2021	752	−0.1%
Source: Statistics Canada

In the 2021 Census of Population conducted by Statistics Canada, Wedgewood had a population of 752 living in 297 of its 305 total private dwellings, a change of −0.1% from its 2016 population of 753. With a land area of 0.53 km^{2} (0.20 sq mi), it had a population density of 1,418.9/km^{2} (3,674.9/sq mi) in 2021.

As a designated place in the 2016 Census of Population conducted by Statistics Canada, Wedgewood had a population of 753 living in 297 of its 304 total private dwellings, a change of −0.3% from its 2011 population of 755. With a land area of 0.53 km^{2} (0.20 sq mi), it had a population density of 1,420.8/km^{2} (3,679.7/sq mi) in 2016.

== See also ==
- List of communities in Alberta
- List of hamlets in Alberta
