= Triple-L-Trailer Court, Alberta =

Triple-L-Trailer Court
- Designated place
- Location of Triple-L-Trailer Court Triple-L-Trailer Court (Canada)
- Coordinates: 55.169°N 118.652°W
- Country: Canada
- Province: Alberta
- Region: Northern Alberta
- Census division: 19
- Municipal district: County of Grande Prairie No. 1

Government
  - Type: Unincorporated
  - Governing body: County of Grande Prairie No. 1 Council

Area (2021)
  - Land: 0.2 km^{2} (0.077 sq mi)

Population (2021)
  - Total: 275
  - Density: 1,383.3/km^{2} (3,583/sq mi)
- Time zone: UTC−06:00 (Alberta Time)
- Area codes: 780, 587, 825

Triple-L-Trailer Court is an unincorporated community in Alberta, Canada within the County of Grande Prairie No. 1 that is recognized as a designated place by Statistics Canada. It is located on the north side of Township Road 714, 2.4 km (1.5 mi) south of Highway 670.

== Demographics ==
In the 2021 Census of Population conducted by Statistics Canada, Triple-L-Trailer Court had a population of 275 living in 120 of its 141 total private dwellings, a change of 105.2% from its 2016 population of 134. With a land area of 0.2 km^{2} (0.077 sq mi), it had a population density of 1,375.0/km^{2} (3,561.2/sq mi) in 2021.

As a designated place in the 2016 Census of Population conducted by Statistics Canada, Triple-L-Trailer Court had a population of 86 living in 34 of its 40 total private dwellings, a change of −56.8% from its 2011 population of 199. With a land area of 0.1 km^{2} (0.039 sq mi), it had a population density of 860.0/km^{2} (2,227.4/sq mi) in 2016.

== See also ==
- List of communities in Alberta
- List of designated places in Alberta
