= Goodfare =

- Hamlet
- Location of Goodfare Goodfare (Canada)
- Coordinates: 55°15′28″N 119°42′59″W
- Country: Canada
- Province: Alberta
- Region: Northern Alberta
- Census division: 19
- Municipal district: County of Grande Prairie No. 1

Government
  - Type: Unincorporated
  - Governing body: County of Grande Prairie No. 1 Council

Population (1986)
  - Total: 11
- Time zone: UTC−06:00 (Alberta Time)
- Area codes: 780, 587, 825

Goodfare is a hamlet in northern Alberta, Canada within the County of Grande Prairie No. 1. It is located on Highway 671, approximately 14 kilometres (8.7 mi) west of Highway 43 and 60 kilometres (37 mi) northwest of Grande Prairie.

Established as a post office in April 1919, after the residents petitioned for postal service, the name Goodfair was chosen, being descriptive of the area, the name was changed to the current spelling since there was already a Goodfair post office in Saskatchewan. John Third was the first postmaster. The area was originally known as Kempton.

== Demographics ==
Goodfare recorded a population of 11 in the 1986 Census of Population conducted by Statistics Canada.

== See also ==
- List of communities in Alberta
- List of hamlets in Alberta
