= Sylvester, Alberta =

Coordinates: 54.99687°N 119.67957°W

Location of Sylvester in Alberta

Sylvester is a locality in northern Alberta, Canada within the County of Grande Prairie No. 1. It is approximately 41 km (25 mi) southwest of Highway 43 and 75 km (47 mi) west of Grande Prairie.

The locality of Sylvester was centered on Sylvester Post Office established in June 1936 about 60 km (37 mi) west-southwest of Grande Prairie on the NW quarter of section 19, township 69, range 11, west of the 6th meridian. It took its name from nearby Sylvester Creek, which in turn was named after Sylvester Belcourt, an Iroquois Cree Metis fur trapper who had settled in the area. The post office also contained a store. The first postmaster was T.R. Elliot. Across from Elliott's store and post office was Itipaw School, a one-room log school which had been built in 1934. The post office closed in 1951, and the school in 1952. Information on Sylvester locality and the people who lived there can be found in Beaverlodge to the Rockies.
