= Wapiti Lake Provincial Park =

Provincial park in British Columbia, Canada

- IUCN category II (national park)
- Location within British Columbia
- Interactive map of Wapiti Lake Provincial Park
- Location: British Columbia, Canada
- Nearest city: Prince George
- Coordinates: 54°30′59″N 120°47′34″W
- Area: 168.09 km^{2} (64.90 sq mi)
- Established: June 29, 2000
- Governing body: BC Parks

Wapiti Lake Provincial Park is a 16,837-hectare (41,610-acre) provincial park in British Columbia, Canada. It is 60 kilometres (37 mi) south of Tumbler Ridge, at the headwaters of Wapiti River, including its watershed from the Wapiti Pass to Wapiti Lake in the Canadian Rockies. The area contains significant amounts of fossils (ichthyosaurs) and fossil beds. There is habitat for grizzly bears, mountain goats, and bull trout. It was established as a Provincial Park on June 26, 2000. It is recognized by the provincial government as being an area traditionally used by First Nations people. Hunting and fishing are permitted in the park.

== See also ==
- List of British Columbia Provincial Parks
- List of Canadian provincial parks
- List of National Parks of Canada
