= Rio Grande, Alberta =

Locality in Alberta, Canada

Coordinates: 55.09850°N 119.70222°W

Location of Rio Grande in Alberta

Rio Grande is a locality in northern Alberta, Canada within the County of Grande Prairie No. 1. It is approximately 32 km (20 mi) southwest of Highway 43 and 65 km (40 mi) west of Grande Prairie.

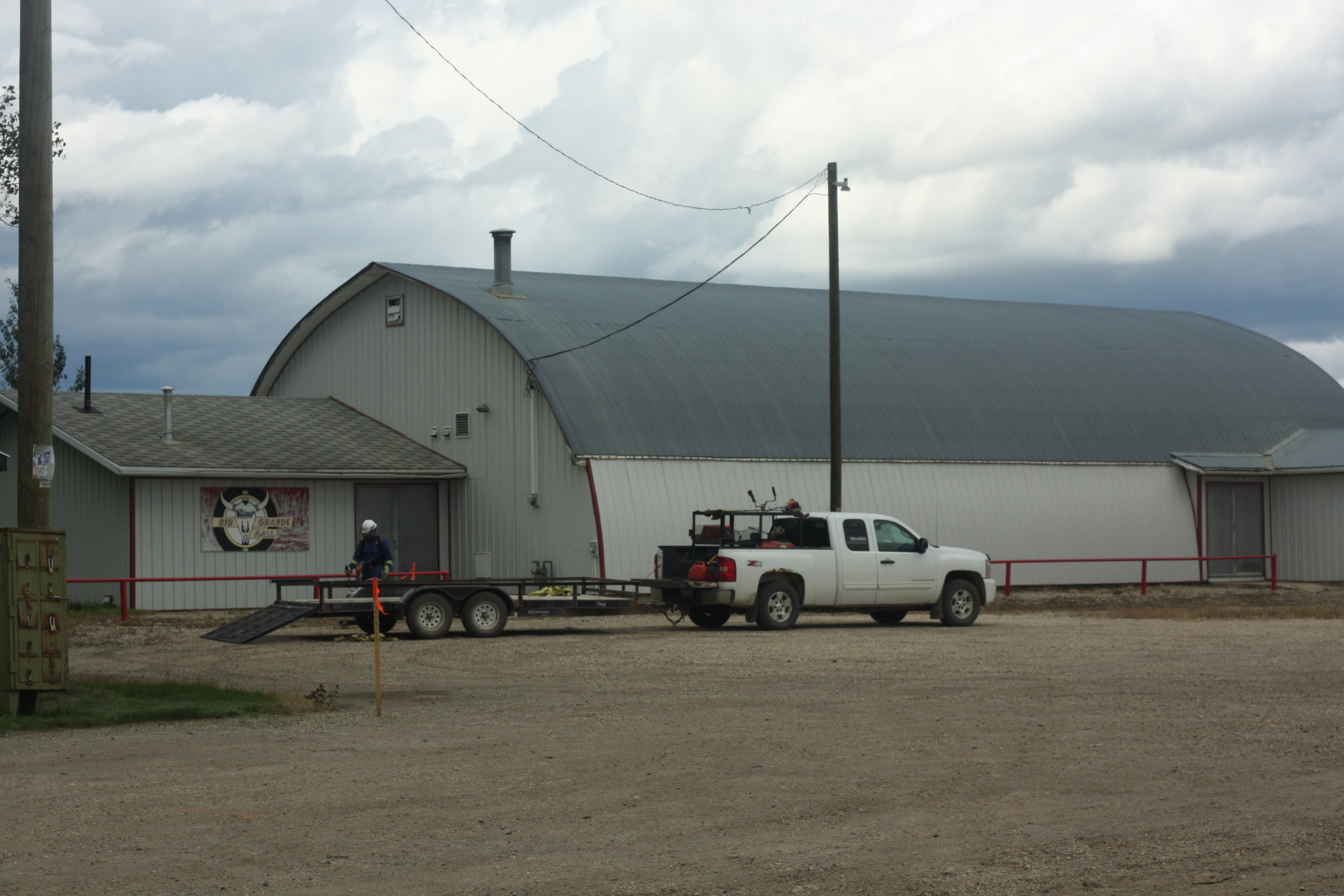
Rio Grande Hall

Rio Grande is a farming community established in the Redwillow River valley, in the Pouce Coupe Prairie of southern Peace River Country. The locality of Rio Grande, approximately 65 km west of Grande Prairie, saw European settlers by 1915, but was also the site of a Metis community before that time. The name was suggested by settlers Min and Clay Stumpt after they spent the winter near the Rio Grande on the Mexico-United States border, perhaps referring to the Redwillow River and the “grande prairie” nearby. Public events and buildings followed one another in quick succession: the first Rio Grande Rodeo in 1916, a Catholic Mission in 1917, Rio Grande School District in 1918, and the post office in 1919. In the late 1920s, the Rio Grande Rodeo received a permanent location on the south banks of the Rio Grande, and on the north side of the river, on the SE quarter of section 35, township 70, range 12, west of the 6th meridian, a hall was added north of a large new church and rectory. A new store and post office was built across the road from the hall. This formed the neucleus of the community for many years until the store was destroyed by fire in 1955. The school closed in 1944 and the post office in 1957, but the Rio Grande Rodeo, the church and the hall still mark the locality of Rio Grande.
