= Teepee Creek =

- Hamlet
- Location of Teepee Creek in Alberta
- Coordinates: 55.3742°N 118.4097°W
- Country: Canada
- Province: Alberta
- Census division: No. 19
- Municipal district: County of Grande Prairie No. 1

Government
  - Type: Unincorporated
  - Reeve: Leanne Beaupre
  - Governing body: County of Grande Prairie No. 1 Council: Leanne Beaupre; Corey Beck; Daryl Beeston; Harold Bulford; Peter Harris; Bob Marshall; Karen Rosvold; Ross Sutherland; Linda Dianne Waddy
- Elevation: 650 m (2,130 ft)

Population (1981)
  - Total: 25
- Time zone: UTC−06:00 (Alberta Time)

Teepee Creek is a hamlet in northwest Alberta, Canada within the County of Grande Prairie No. 1. It is located north of Bezanson and east of Sexsmith, at the intersection of Highway 674 and Highway 733.

The hamlet is located in census division No. 19 and in the federal riding of Peace River.

It was a farming and ranching community that became an oil and gas based economy during the 1980s.

== Demographics ==
Teepee Creek recorded a population of 25 in the 1981 Census of Population conducted by Statistics Canada.

== Amenities ==
As of 2006, the community had Teepee Creek School, community hall, fire hall and arena.

== Attractions ==
Teepee Creek is known to most people for its stampede. In the 1960s the stampede was the most popular rodeo in northern Alberta. The first stampede was held in 1917.

== See also ==
- List of communities in Alberta
- List of hamlets in Alberta
