= Wapiti Pass =

Mountain pass in British Columbia, Canada

- Location within British Columbia
- Elevation: 1,375 m (4,511 ft)

Third Approach
- Location: British Columbia, Canada
- Range: Canadian Rockies
- Coordinates: 54°26′N 120°49′W
- Topo map: NTS 93I7 Wapiti Pass

Wapiti Pass is a mountain pass in the Northern Rocky Mountains of British Columbia, Canada. It lies immediately east of Wapiti Lake Provincial Park, at the headwaters of the Wapiti River, northeast of Prince George and west of Monkman Provincial Park.

No roads or railways cross the pass. While it and Monkman Pass were surveyed prior to the building of the Grand Trunk Pacific Railway, the GTP decided to use the Yellowhead Pass to the southeast instead.
