= Elmworth =

- Hamlet
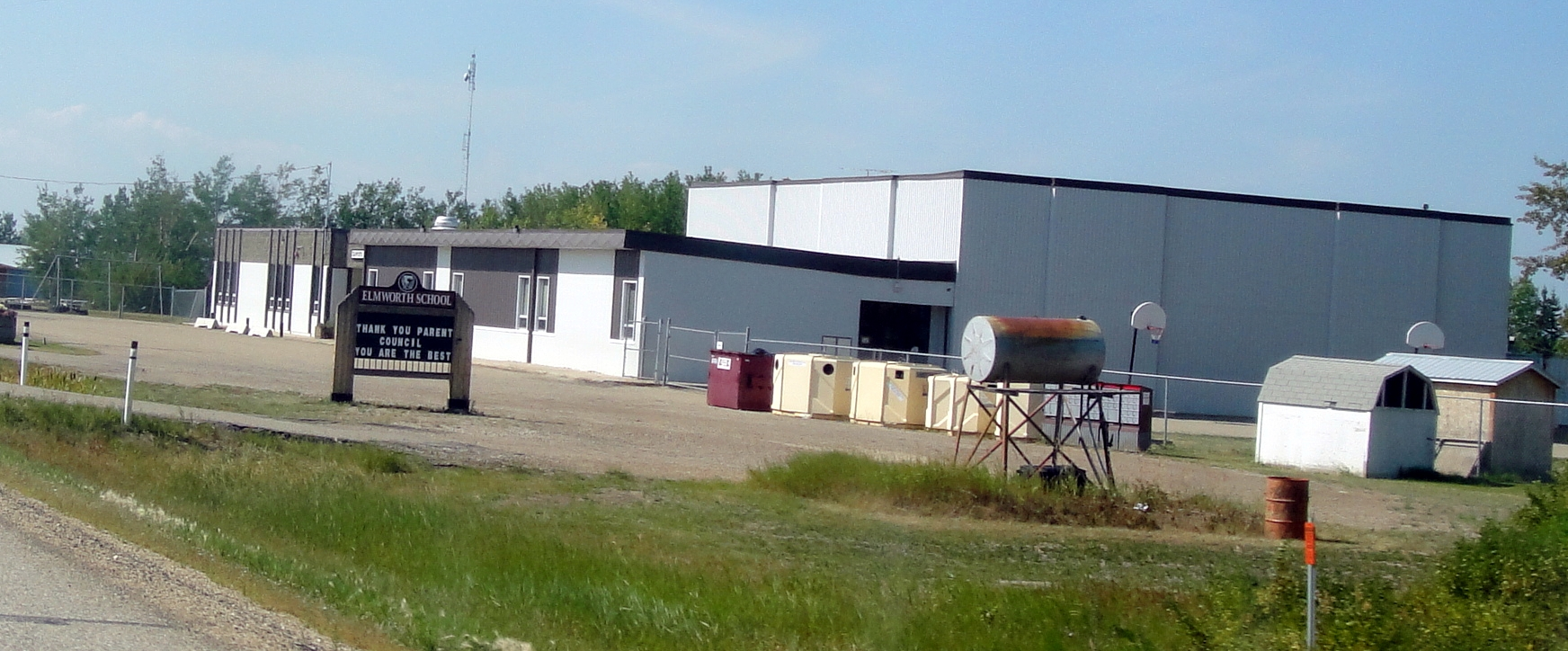
- Elmworth School

- Location of Elmworth in Alberta Elmworth (Canada) Elmworth (North America)
- Coordinates: 55.0539°N 119.6158°W
- Country: Canada
- Province: Alberta
- Census division: No. 19
- Municipal district: County of Grande Prairie No. 1

Government
  - Type: Unincorporated
  - Reeve: Leanne Beaupre
  - Governing body: County of Grande Prairie No. 1 Council: Leanne Beaupre; Corey Beck; Daryl Beeston; Harold Bulford; Peter Harris; Bob Marshall; Karen Rosvold; Ross Sutherland; Linda Dianne Waddy
- Elevation: 715 m (2,346 ft)

Population (1981)
  - Total: 8
- Time zone: UTC−06:00 (Alberta Time)

Elmworth is a hamlet in northern Alberta, Canada within the County of Grande Prairie No. 1. It is located on Highway 722 north of the Wapiti River and east of the British Columbia border. It has an elevation of 715 metres (2,346 ft). The Elmworth natural gas field stretches west and south of the hamlet.

The hamlet is located in census division No. 19 and in the federal riding of Peace River. The hamlet of Elmworth formed around Elmworth School District 3791, established in March 1919 and named after Elmworth, New Brunswick, home of settler Franklin Brewer. Classes began in a borrowed log cabin until the school could be built on the SE quarter of section 16, township 70, range 11, west of the 6th meridian. On 1 December 1920 a post office was opened in the Brewer home, and in 1927, the Brewers decided to add a country store to their services. They built a new home, store and post office across from the school on the NW quarter of section 9. The store also contained the government telephone. These two buildings formed the nucleus of the hamlet of Elmworth until the Elmworth Hall was added in 1947, a Community Church in 1948, and the Elmworth Cemetery soon after.

== Climate ==
Climate data for Elmworth, Alberta
| Month | Jan | Feb | Mar | Apr | May | Jun | Jul | Aug | Sep | Oct | Nov | Dec | Year |
|---|---|---|---|---|---|---|---|---|---|---|---|---|---|
| Record high °C (°F) | 16.5 (61.7) | 19.0 (66.2) | 17.0 (62.6) | 29.4 (84.9) | 32.0 (89.6) | 33.0 (91.4) | 35.5 (95.9) | 37.5 (99.5) | 32.5 (90.5) | 26.5 (79.7) | 19.4 (66.9) | 14.0 (57.2) | 37.5 (99.5) |
| Mean daily maximum °C (°F) | −5.7 (21.7) | −2.3 (27.9) | 2.1 (35.8) | 10.3 (50.5) | 16.8 (62.2) | 20.7 (69.3) | 22.7 (72.9) | 21.8 (71.2) | 16.6 (61.9) | 9.3 (48.7) | −0.4 (31.3) | −3.8 (25.2) | 9.0 (48.2) |
| Daily mean °C (°F) | −11.6 (11.1) | −8.7 (16.3) | −4.1 (24.6) | 3.5 (38.3) | 9.4 (48.9) | 13.4 (56.1) | 15.5 (59.9) | 14.3 (57.7) | 9.5 (49.1) | 3.2 (37.8) | −5.5 (22.1) | −9.3 (15.3) | 2.5 (36.5) |
| Mean daily minimum °C (°F) | −17.5 (0.5) | −15.1 (4.8) | −10.4 (13.3) | −3.4 (25.9) | 1.9 (35.4) | 6.2 (43.2) | 8.2 (46.8) | 6.8 (44.2) | 2.3 (36.1) | −3.0 (26.6) | −10.7 (12.7) | −14.8 (5.4) | −4.1 (24.6) |
| Record low °C (°F) | −56.7 (−70.1) | −53.3 (−64.0) | −41.7 (−43.1) | −28.0 (−18.4) | −15.0 (5.0) | −2.0 (28.4) | −3.0 (26.6) | −4.5 (23.9) | −9.0 (15.8) | −32.0 (−25.6) | −40.0 (−40.0) | −44.4 (−47.9) | −56.7 (−70.1) |
| Average precipitation mm (inches) | 22.4 (0.88) | 16.8 (0.66) | 18.1 (0.71) | 16.6 (0.65) | 44.4 (1.75) | 74.4 (2.93) | 81.1 (3.19) | 62.8 (2.47) | 45.9 (1.81) | 30.0 (1.18) | 21.8 (0.86) | 18.8 (0.74) | 453.0 (17.83) |
| Average rainfall mm (inches) | 0.1 (0.00) | 0.1 (0.00) | 0.5 (0.02) | 9.0 (0.35) | 40.7 (1.60) | 74.4 (2.93) | 81.1 (3.19) | 62.6 (2.46) | 45.1 (1.78) | 17.9 (0.70) | 1.8 (0.07) | 0.4 (0.02) | 333.7 (13.14) |
| Average snowfall cm (inches) | 22.4 (8.8) | 16.7 (6.6) | 17.6 (6.9) | 7.6 (3.0) | 3.7 (1.5) | 0.0 (0.0) | 0.0 (0.0) | 0.2 (0.1) | 0.8 (0.3) | 12.1 (4.8) | 19.9 (7.8) | 18.4 (7.2) | 119.3 (47.0) |
Source: Environment Canada

== Demographics ==
Elmworth recorded a population of 8 in the 1981 Census of Population conducted by Statistics Canada.

== Amenities ==
The hamlet is served by a school, the Elmworth School, administered by the Peace Wapiti School Division. The K-9 school has about 80 students.

A curling club was established in the community in 1963 and is still operational, offering two ice sheets and a yearly bonspiel. A rural store serves the hamlet and nearby settlements and farms. A church serving different denominations is now closed.

The Elmworth gas plant is operated by ConocoPhillips Canada immediately south of the settlement. It was opened in 1979 by Canadian Hunter Exploration.

== See also ==
- List of communities in Alberta
- List of hamlets in Alberta
