= Webster, Alberta =

Canadian locality

Coordinates: 55.4330394°N 118.6992938°W

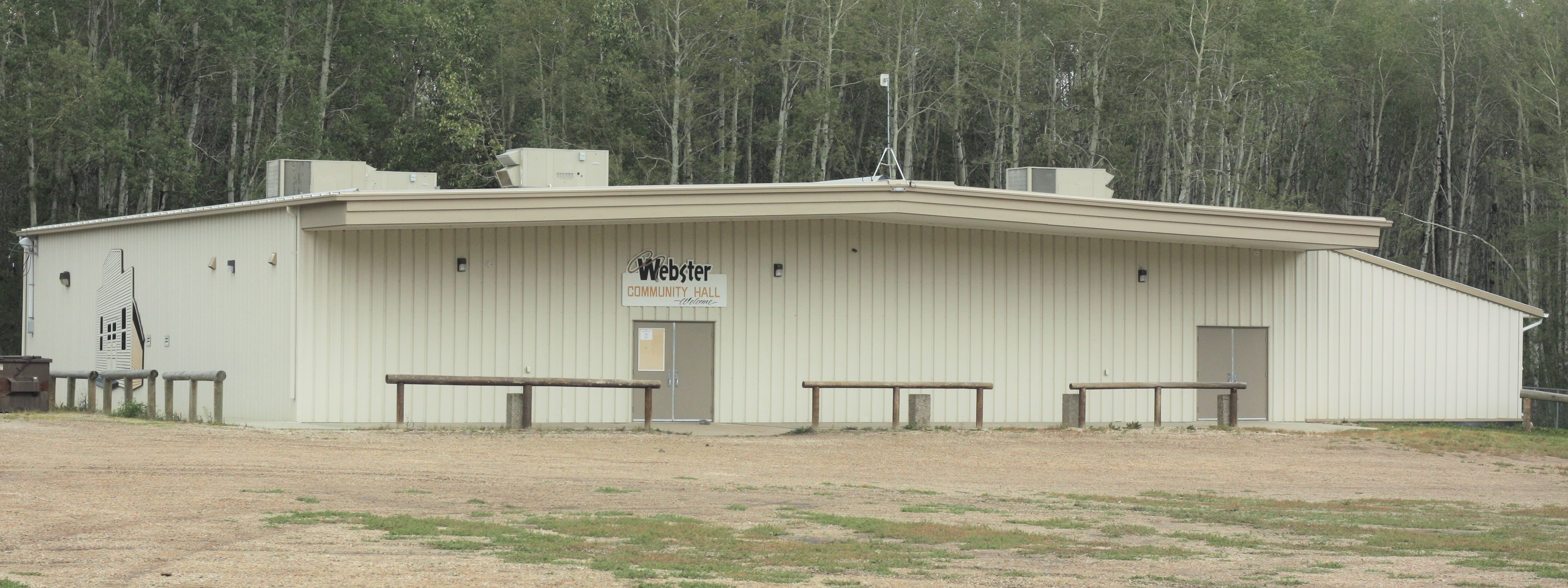
Webster Community Hall.

Webster is a locality in northern Alberta, Canada within the County of Grande Prairie No. 1. It was established in 1916 as a station on the Edmonton, Dunvegan and British Columbia Railway, approximately 30 km (19 mi) north of Grande Prairie. It was named after George Webster, a subcontractor for the railway at that time.

Although there were a few railway workers who lived in the area from 1916 to the late 1920s, the town was properly settled in 1929 by Polish immigrants from the Vermilion area who had fled Poland after Russia invaded following World War I. In the fall of 1929, a store was opened by Andrew and Cathy Hancharyk, and a post office opened on October 15, 1929, with Andrew Hancharyk as postmaster. Across the street from the store was a butcher shop and café.

The community included two livery barns, a single elevator which served an area as far away as Heart Valley, an elevator house, and a water tank for trains. Across the creek was the Webster sawmill. In 1930, a large Catholic church was erected, which also served as a schoolroom for the Torun School District for several years. In the late 1930s, Webster Hall was built for community gatherings, and a rectory was added for the first resident Catholic priest.

In later years, the elevator was destroyed by fire, followed by the church in the early 1960s. In 1957, Torun School closed, and the students were vanned to Sexsmith. The post office closed in 1966, leaving only the hall and the Catholic grotto which had been erected beside the church, as well as the Webster Cemetery.
