= Hythe, Alberta =

Hythe
- Hamlet
- Hamlet of Hythe
- Location in County of Grande Prairie

- Location within Alberta
- Coordinates: 55°19′51″N 119°33′23″W
- Country: Canada
- Province: Alberta
- Region: Northern Alberta
- Planning region: Upper Peace
- Municipal district: County of Grande Prairie No. 1
- Founded: 1928
- Incorporated
  - Village: August 31, 1929
- Dissolved: July 1, 2021

Area (2021)
  - Land: 4.03 km^{2} (1.56 sq mi)
- Elevation: 745 m (2,444 ft)

Population (2021)
  - Total: 854
  - Density: 211.9/km^{2} (549/sq mi)
- Time zone: UTC−06:00 (Alberta Time)
- Postal code span: T0H 2C0
- Area code: +1-780
- Highways: Highway 43
- Waterways: Beaverlodge River
- Website: Official website

Hythe is a hamlet in northwest Alberta, Canada within the County of Grande Prairie No. 1. It is located on Highway 43 approximately 58 km (36 mi) northwest of the City of Grande Prairie and 73 km (45 mi) southeast of the City of Dawson Creek, British Columbia. It held village status prior to July 2021.

== History ==
Hythe's post office was established in 1914 and named after Hythe, Kent in England. The community was incorporated as a village on August 31, 1929. The village dissolved becoming a hamlet under the jurisdiction of the County of Grande Prairie No. 1 on July 1, 2021.

== Geography ==
Hythe is located in an area known as the Peace River Country that straddles northwest Alberta and northeast British Columbia.

== Demographics ==
Federal census population history
Year	Pop.	±%
1931	278	—
1936	260	−6.5%
1941	247	−5.0%
1946	288	+16.6%
1951	342	+18.8%
1956	481	+40.6%
1961	449	−6.7%
1966	445	−0.9%
1971	487	+9.4%
1976	460	−5.5%
1981	639	+38.9%
1986	673	+5.3%
1991	623	−7.4%
1996	712	+14.3%
2001	582	−18.3%
2006	821	+41.1%
2011	820	−0.1%
2016	827	+0.9%
Source: Statistics Canada

In the 2021 Census of Population conducted by Statistics Canada, the Hamlet of Hythe had a population of 854 living in 276 of its 312 total private dwellings, a change of 3.3% from its 2016 population of 827. With a land area of 4.03 km^{2} (1.56 sq mi), it had a population density of 211.9/km^{2} (548.8/sq mi) in 2021.

In the 2016 Census of Population conducted by Statistics Canada, Hythe had a population of 827 living in 289 of its 320 total private dwellings, a 0.9% change from its 2011 population of 820. With a land area of 4.1 km^{2} (1.6 sq mi), it had a population density of 201.7/km^{2} (522.4/sq mi) in 2016.

== Economy ==
The economy of Hythe and area is driven by agriculture, forestry and oil and gas.

== Arts and culture ==
Hythe hosts an annual agricultural fair and celebrates an annual South Peace Centennial Museum Day.

== Attractions ==
Recreational amenities in Hythe include a hockey arena, a curling rink and ball diamonds. It also has a bowling alley and was home to the Hythe Motor Speedway, which used to operate annually between May and September.

== Education ==
Hythe Regional School, operated by Peace Wapiti School Division No. 76, offers kindergarten through grade nine schooling to children of Hythe and nearby communities. After junior high, local senior high students attend Beaverlodge Regional High School in the nearby Town of Beaverlodge, which is located 16 km (9.9 mi) to the southeast.

== See also ==
- List of communities in Alberta
- List of villages in Alberta
