= Wapiti River =

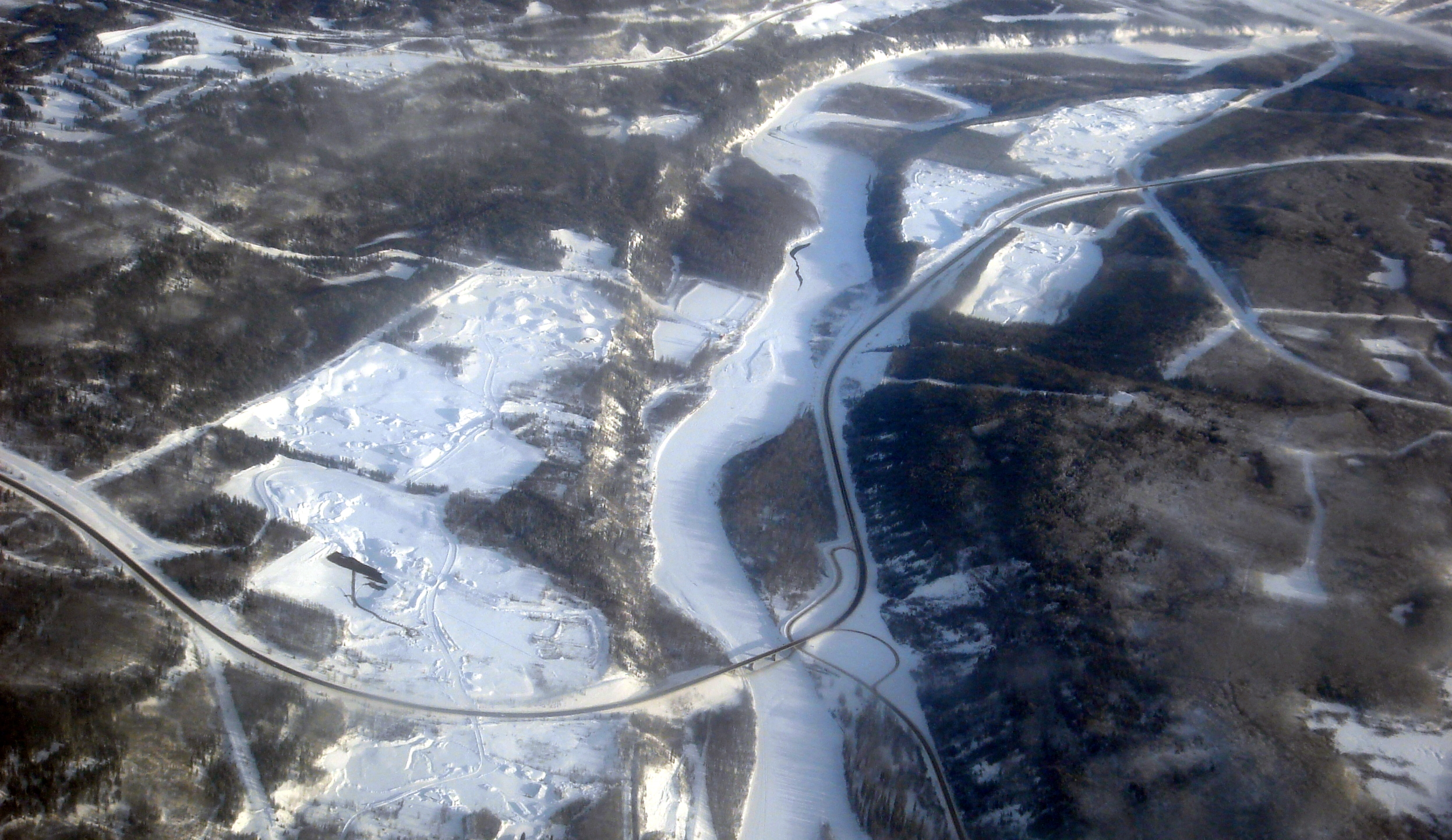

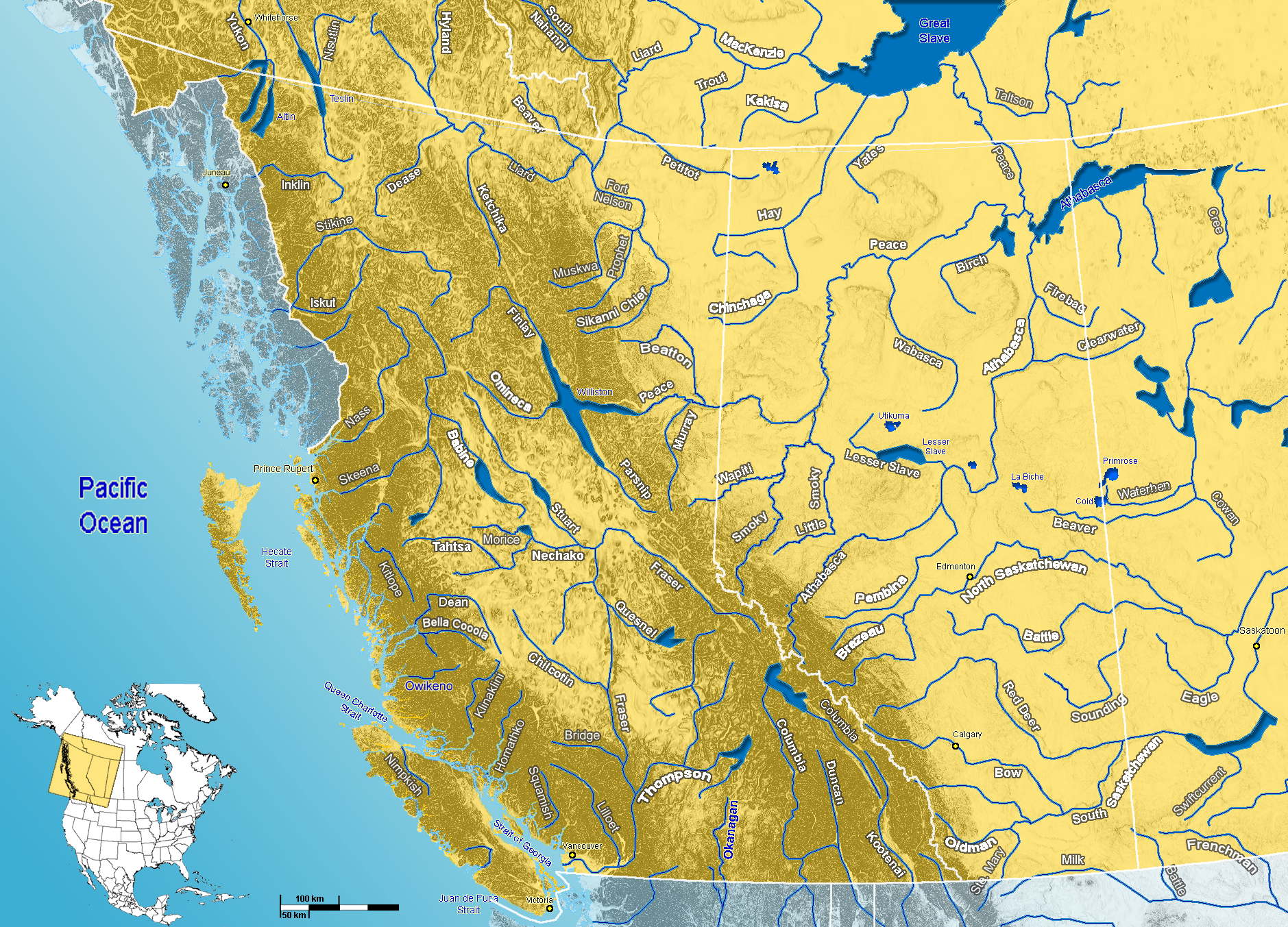
- Wapiti River in western Canada

Location
- Country: Canada

Physical characteristics
- Source
  - location: Tuck Lake, Wapiti Pass
  - coordinates: 54.44069°N 120.79021°W
  - elevation: 1,370 m (4,490 ft)
- Mouth
  - location: Smoky River
  - coordinates: 55.13784°N 118.30152°W
  - elevation: 485 m (1,591 ft)
- Discharge
  - average: 100 m^{3}/s (3,500 cu ft/s)

The Wapiti River /ˈwɑːpɪdiː/ is a river in eastern British Columbia and western Alberta, Canada. It is a major tributary of the Smoky River, located in the southern area of the Peace River Basin.

Wapiti is named after the Cree word for elk (waapiti).

== Course ==
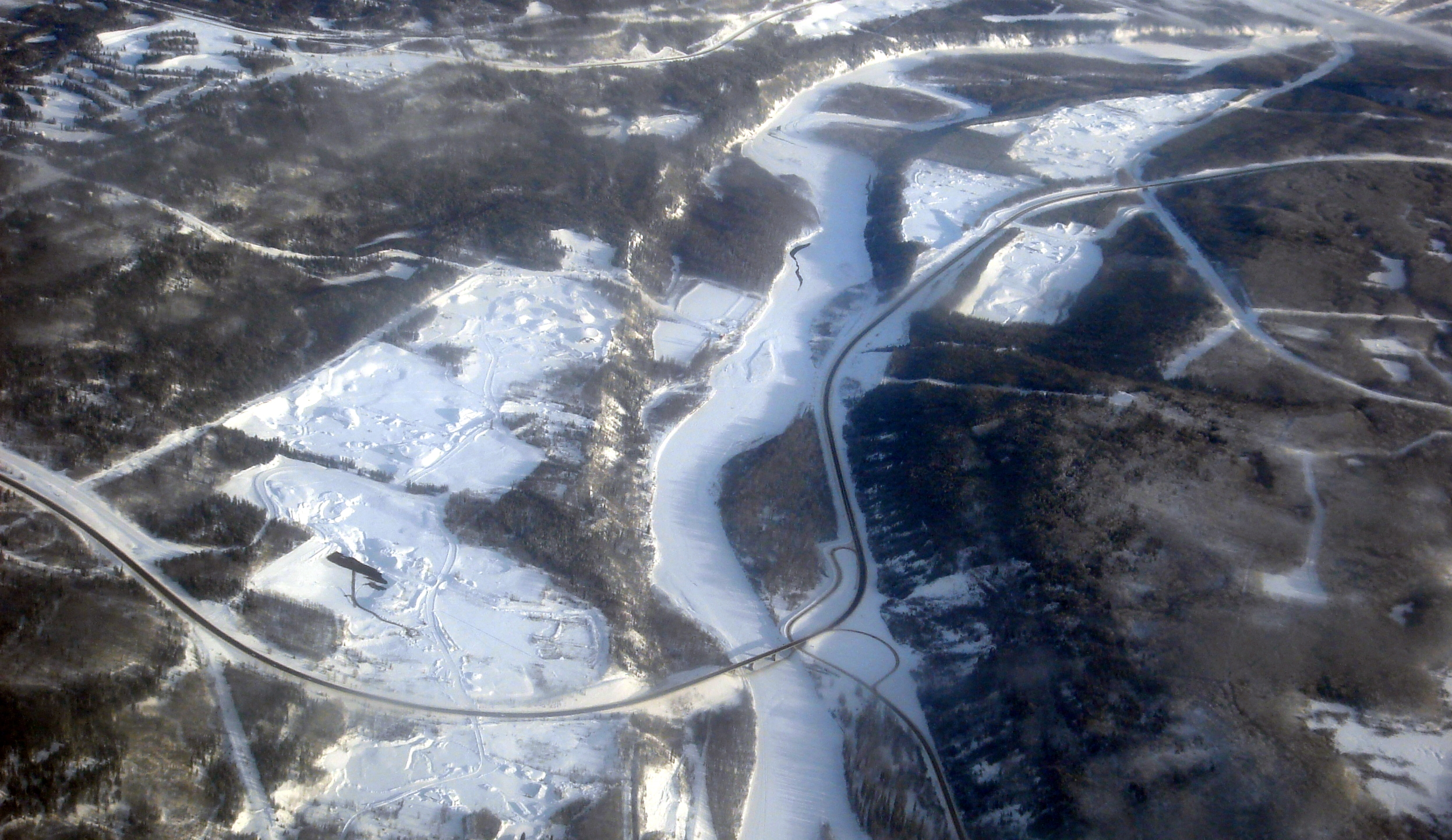
Wapiti River crossed by Highway 40 south of Grande Prairie

Wapiti River originates as the outflow of Tuck Lake, east of Wapiti Pass, in Wapiti Lake Provincial Park, east-central British Columbia, in the Canadian Rockies. It then runs in a north-eastern direction, crosses into Alberta, where it becomes more meandered as it continues through the County of Grande Prairie No. 1. It merges into the Smoky River 30 kilometres (19 mi) east of Grande Prairie.

From west to east, Wapiti River flows through the alpine environment of the Rocky Mountains, the rolling foothills, then farmlands and aspen parkland in western Alberta. Wapiti Lake Provincial Park, Bear River Park, O'Brien Provincial Park and Pipestone Creek Park are protected areas along the river.

Close to its mouth, Wapiti has an average discharge of 100 cubic metres per second (3,500 cu ft/s).

== Tributaries and crossings ==
Tributary/Crossing	Location	Remarks
Tuck Lake	54.44069°N 120.79021°W	Originates from Tuck Lake in Wapiti Pass
Wapiti Lake	54.56148°N 120.77831°W	Flows into Wapiti Lake
Wapiti Lake	54.58420°N 120.75794°W	Flows from Wapiti Lake
Wapiti Lake Provincial Park	54.59638°N 120.73880°W	Leaves Park
Fearless Creek	54.73646°N 120.51058°W	Left tributary, also waters of Dokken Creek
Calliou Creek	54.74127°N 120.45839°W	Left tributary
Red Deer Creek	54.68386°N 120.24966°W	Right tributary
Belcourt Creek	54.68479°N 120.10373°W	Right tributary
Mistanusk Creek	54.70038°N 120.06016°W	Right tributary, from Boundary Lake
Alberta/British Columbia	54.73684°N 120.00109°W	Crosses into the province of Alberta
Chinook Creek	54.72715°N 119.94752°W	Right tributary, from Chinook Ridge
Narraway River	54.73503°N 119.92292°W	Right tributary
Lingrell Creek	54.77732°N 119.84333°W	Right tributary, from Lingrell Lake
Nose Creek	54.86847°N 119.63802°W	Right tributary
Calahoo Creek	54.91894°N 119.68454°W	Left tributary
Smith Creek	54.95758°N 119.60497°W	Left tributary
Pinto Creek	54.97542°N 119.45228°W	Right tributary
West Iroquois Creek	55.00271°N 119.37504°W	Right tributary
Iroquois Creek	55.02108°N 119.31770°W	Right tributary
Redwillow River	55.03241°N 119.30971°W	Left tributary, carries waters from Beaverlodge River as well
Pipestone Creek	55.04614°N 119.10261°W	Left tributary
Spring Creek	55.07790°N 118.94005°W	Left tributary
Highway 40	55.07206°N 118.80483°W	Crossed by road bridge
Big Mountain Creek	55.05953°N 118.66093°W	Right tributary
Canadian National Railway	55.07215°N 118.62247°W	Crossed by railway bridge
Bear River	55.10725°N 118.48549°W	Left tributary
Smoky River	55.13784°N 118.30152°W	Empties into the Smoky River as left tributary

== See also ==
- List of rivers of British Columbia
- List of rivers of Alberta
