= County of Grande Prairie No. 1 =

Municipal district in Alberta, Canada

- Municipal district
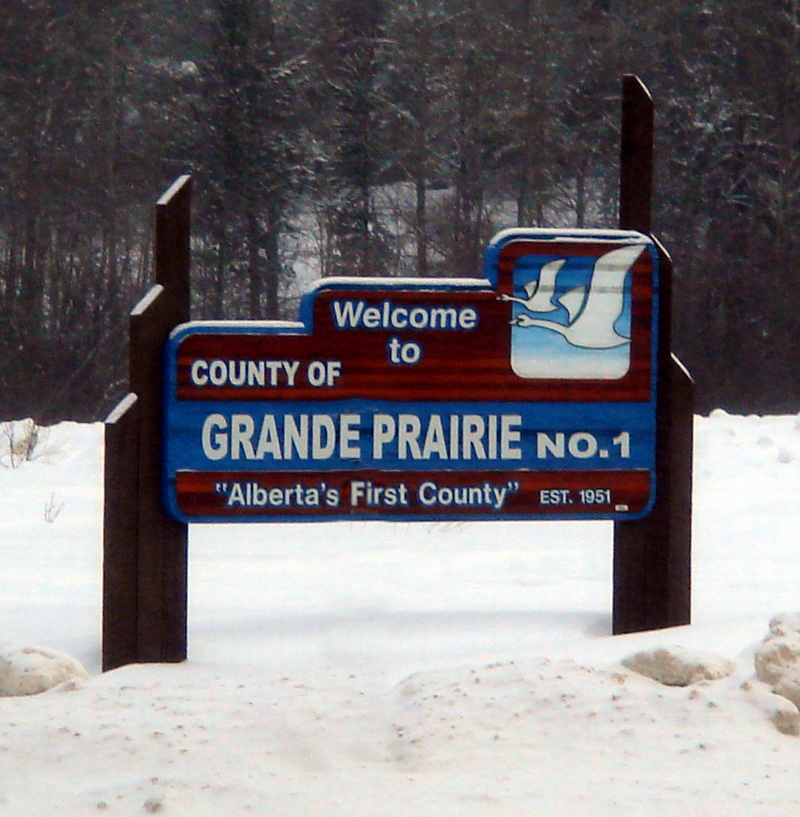
- Welcome sign

- Logo
- Nickname: Alberta's First County

- Location within Alberta
- Country: Canada
- Province: Alberta
- Region: Northern Alberta
- Planning region: Upper Peace
- Established: 1943
- Incorporated: 1951

Government
  - Reeve: Leanne Beaupre
  - Governing body: County of Grande Prairie No. 1 Council: Leanne Beaupre; Corey Beck; Daryl Beeston; Harold Bulford; Peter Harris; Bob Marshall; Karen Rosvold; Ross Sutherland; Linda Dianne Waddy
  - Administrator: Joulia Whittleton
  - Administrative office: Clairmont

Area (2021)
  - Land: 5,790.59 km^{2} (2,235.76 sq mi)

Population (2021)
  - Total: 23,769
  - Density: 4.1/km^{2} (11/sq mi)
- Time zone: UTC−06:00 (Alberta Time)
- Website: countygp.ab.ca

The County of Grande Prairie No. 1 is a municipal district in northwestern Alberta, Canada in Census Division No. 19.

It is bounded on the south by the Wapiti River, on the east by the Smoky River and on the west by the province of British Columbia.

== Geography ==
=== Communities and localities ===
The following urban municipalities are surrounded by the County of Grande Prairie No. 1.

Cities

- Grande Prairie

Towns

- Beaverlodge
- Sexsmith
- Wembley

Villages

- none

Summer villages

- none

The following hamlets are located within the County of Grande Prairie No. 1.

Hamlets

- Bezanson
- Buffalo Lakes
- Clairmont
- Demmitt
- Dimsdale
- Elmworth
- Goodfare
- Halcourt
- Huallen
- Hythe
- La Glace
- Lymburn
- Teepee Creek
- Valhalla Centre
- Wedgewood

The following localities are located within the County of Grande Prairie No. 1.

Localities

- Albright
- Aspen Ridge Estates
- Aspen Ridge Subdivision
- Bad Heart
- Bear Lake
- Brainard
- Bredin
- Clairmont Trailer Court
- Fitzsimmons
- Flying Shot
- Flyingshot Lake Settlement (designated place and settlement)
- Glen Leslie
- Grande Prairie Aerodrome
- Gundy
- Hayfield
- Hazelmere
- Hermit Lake

- Hilltop Estates
- Hinton Trail
- Hockey Estates
- Homestead
- J D Barr Subdivision
- J.D. Renton Subdivision
- J.D. Willis Subdivision
- Kleskun Hill
- Lake Saskatoon
- Lakeview Estates
- Leighmore
- Lynburn
- Mansfield Subdivision
- Maple Grove
- Morgan's Mountain Subdivision
- Mount Valley
- Mountainside Acres

- Mountainside Estates
- Niobe
- Nordhagen Subdivision
- Pine Valley Estates
- Pine Valley Subdivision
- Pipestone Creek
- Poplar Hill
- Research Station
- Richmond Hill Estates
- Richmond Subdivision
- Rio Grande
- Riverview Pines Estates
- Riverview Pines Subdivision (designated place)
- Sandy Lane
- Sandy Lanes
- Sandy Ridge Estates

- Shaver
- Silvestre
- Smoky Heights
- South Pine Valley Estates
- Sprucewood Subdivision
- Swan City Trailer Court (designated place)
- Sylvester
- The Dunes
- Triple-L-Trailer Court (designated place)
- Valhalla
- Webster
- Willow Wood Subdivision
- Willowood Estates
- Windsor Creek
- Woodlake Estates
- Woodland Acres

Horse Lakes 152B is an Indian reserve within the County of Grande Prairie No. 1.

== Demographics ==
Federal census population history
Year	Pop.	±%
1951	10,126	—
1956	8,899	−12.1%
1961	8,803	−1.1%
1966	8,697	−1.2%
1971	8,496	−2.3%
1976	9,147	+7.7%
1981	12,078	+32.0%
1986	12,075	−0.0%
1991	12,314	+2.0%
1996	13,537	+9.9%
2001	15,638	+15.5%
2006	17,970	+14.9%
2011	19,724	+9.8%
2016	22,303	+13.1%
Source: Statistics Canada

In the 2021 Census of Population conducted by Statistics Canada, the County of Grande Prairie No. 1 had a population of 23,769 living in 8,354 of its 9,075 total private dwellings, a change of 5.6% from its 2016 population of 22,502. With a land area of 5,790.59 km^{2} (2,235.76 sq mi), it had a population density of 4.1/km^{2} (10.6/sq mi) in 2021.

In the 2016 Census of Population conducted by Statistics Canada, the County of Grande Prairie No. 1 had a population of 22,303 living in 7,684 of its 8,291 total private dwellings, a 13.1% change from its 2011 population of 19,724. With a land area of 5,802.21 km^{2} (2,240.25 sq mi), it had a population density of 3.8/km^{2} (10.0/sq mi) in 2016.

The County of Grande Prairie No. 1 conducted a municipal census in 2012, which resulted in an estimated population of 21,157, a 17.6% increase over its 2006 municipal census population of 17,989.

== See also ==
- List of communities in Alberta
- List of municipal districts in Alberta
