= Beaverlodge =

- Town
- Town of Beaverlodge
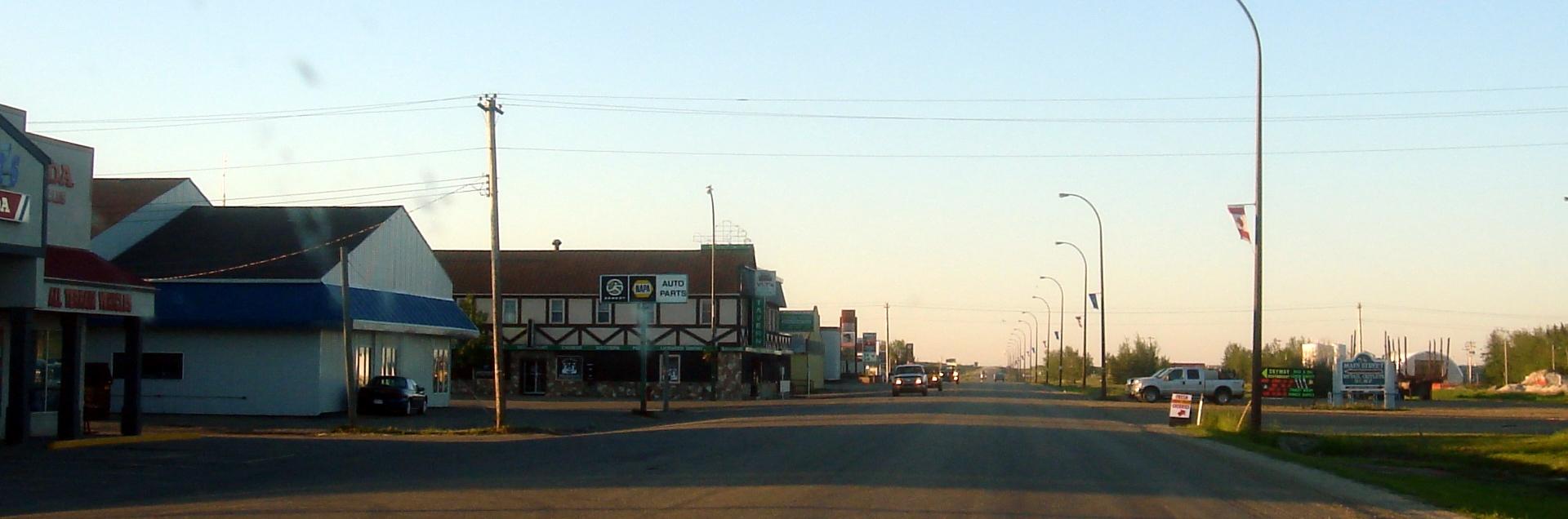
- Highway 43 passing through Beaverlodge

- Town boundaries

- Location in Alberta Location in Grande Prairie County
- Coordinates: 55°12′34″N 119°25′45″W
- Country: Canada
- Province: Alberta
- Region: Northern Alberta
- Planning region: Upper Peace
- Municipal district: County of Grande Prairie No. 1
- Incorporated
  - Village: July 31, 1929
  - Town: January 24, 1956

Government
  - Mayor: Gary Rycroft
  - Governing body: Beaverlodge Town Council

Area (2021)
  - Land: 5.38 km^{2} (2.08 sq mi)
- Elevation: 730 m (2,400 ft)

Population (2021)
  - Total: 2,271
  - Density: 421.9/km^{2} (1,093/sq mi)
- Time zone: UTC−06:00 (Alberta Time)
- Highways: Highway 43
- Waterways: Beaverlodge River
- Website: Official website

Beaverlodge is a town in northern Alberta, Canada. It is located on Highway 43, 43 km (27 mi) west of Grande Prairie and 48 km (30 mi) east of the British Columbia border.

== History ==
The town was named for the Beaverlodge River, which was known as Uz-i-pa ("temporary lodge") by members of the Beaver First Nation. The first European-Canadian settlers arrived in 1909.

In 1953, a Specialized Canadian Forces Station was built five miles northeast of the town. It was a General Surveillance Radar Station built as part of the NORAD pact with U.S. The buildings were operated by U.S military members, until the mid 60s when control was handed back to the Royal Canadian Air Force. Operations at the base ceased on April 1, 1988, when the threat of the Cold War decreased. The buildings were all eventually demolished in the mid 1990s.

== Geography ==
=== Climate ===
Beaverlodge experiences a subarctic climate (Köppen climate classification Dfc) that borders on a humid continental climate (Köppen Dfb).

Climate data for Beaverlodge (1981–2010)
Month	Jan	Feb	Mar	Apr	May	Jun	Jul	Aug	Sep	Oct	Nov	Dec	Year
Record high °C (°F)	16.7 (62.1)	16.1 (61.0)	16.1 (61.0)	28.9 (84.0)	32.8 (91.0)	37.5 (99.5)	36.7 (98.1)	34.5 (94.1)	31.7 (89.1)	27.8 (82.0)	21.7 (71.1)	16.7 (62.1)	37.5 (99.5)
Mean daily maximum °C (°F)	−7 (19)	−3.3 (26.1)	1.4 (34.5)	9.6 (49.3)	16.1 (61.0)	19.7 (67.5)	21.7 (71.1)	21.2 (70.2)	15.9 (60.6)	8.8 (47.8)	−1.3 (29.7)	−5.1 (22.8)	8.1 (46.6)
Daily mean °C (°F)	−11.7 (10.9)	−8.4 (16.9)	−3.7 (25.3)	3.9 (39.0)	9.7 (49.5)	13.6 (56.5)	15.5 (59.9)	14.7 (58.5)	9.9 (49.8)	3.7 (38.7)	−5.5 (22.1)	−9.8 (14.4)	2.7 (36.9)
Mean daily minimum °C (°F)	−16.3 (2.7)	−13.3 (8.1)	−8.9 (16.0)	−1.8 (28.8)	3.2 (37.8)	7.5 (45.5)	9.1 (48.4)	8.2 (46.8)	3.9 (39.0)	−1.4 (29.5)	−9.7 (14.5)	−14.4 (6.1)	−2.8 (27.0)
Record low °C (°F)	−47.8 (−54.0)	−47.2 (−53.0)	−38.9 (−38.0)	−35 (−31)	−12.2 (10.0)	−6.7 (19.9)	−5 (23)	−3 (27)	−11.7 (10.9)	−29 (−20)	−40.5 (−40.9)	−43.3 (−45.9)	−47.8 (−54.0)
Average precipitation mm (inches)	29.4 (1.16)	18.0 (0.71)	15.8 (0.62)	19.9 (0.78)	36.9 (1.45)	71.7 (2.82)	69.7 (2.74)	56.5 (2.22)	42.2 (1.66)	24.4 (0.96)	26.5 (1.04)	22.2 (0.87)	433.1 (17.05)
Average rainfall mm (inches)	1.3 (0.05)	0.6 (0.02)	1.1 (0.04)	10.4 (0.41)	33.7 (1.33)	71.7 (2.82)	69.7 (2.74)	56.4 (2.22)	41.6 (1.64)	14.8 (0.58)	2.8 (0.11)	0.4 (0.02)	304.6 (11.99)
Average snowfall cm (inches)	31.7 (12.5)	19.1 (7.5)	16.0 (6.3)	8.7 (3.4)	2.8 (1.1)	0.0 (0.0)	0.0 (0.0)	0.1 (0.0)	0.6 (0.2)	9.1 (3.6)	25.3 (10.0)	23.9 (9.4)	137.2 (54.0)
Average precipitation days (≥ 0.2 mm)	9.6	7.8	7.2	6.8	10.7	13.7	14.0	12.5	13.1	10.9	9.4	8.3	124.0
Average rainy days (≥ 0.2 mm)	1.2	0.58	0.95	4.4	10.6	13.7	14.0	12.5	12.9	8.1	1.8	0.43	81.1
Average snowy days (≥ 0.2 cm)	8.6	6.8	6.0	2.8	0.76	0.0	0.0	0.04	0.42	3.1	7.7	8.1	44.3
Mean monthly sunshine hours	76.7	104.4	172.8	220.0	264.6	281.2	298.4	267.1	177.3	131.8	78.1	68.6	2,141
Percentage possible sunshine	31.7	38.4	47.2	52.0	52.8	54.2	57.3	57.5	46.2	40.4	30.9	30.5	44.9
Source: Environment Canada

== Demographics ==
Federal census population history
Year	Pop.	±%
1931	211	—
1936	203	−3.8%
1941	331	+63.1%
1946	443	+33.8%
1951	514	+16.0%
1956	768	+49.4%
1961	897	+16.8%
1966	1,083	+20.7%
1971	1,172	+8.2%
1976	1,332	+13.7%
1981	1,937	+45.4%
1986	1,808	−6.7%
1991	1,779	−1.6%
1996	1,997	+12.3%
2001	2,110	+5.7%
2006	2,264	+7.3%
2011	2,365	+4.5%
2016	2,465	+4.2%
2021	2,271	−7.9%
Source: Statistics Canada

In the 2021 Census of Population conducted by Statistics Canada, the Town of Beaverlodge had a population of 2,271 living in 923 of its 1,022 total private dwellings, a change of −7.9% from its 2016 population of 2,465. With a land area of 5.38 km^{2} (2.08 sq mi), it had a population density of 422.1/km^{2} (1,093.3/sq mi) in 2021.

In the 2016 Census of Population conducted by Statistics Canada, the Town of Beaverlodge recorded a population of 2,465 living in 953 of its 1,024 total private dwellings, a 4.2% change from its 2011 population of 2,365. With a land area of 5.73 km^{2} (2.21 sq mi), it had a population density of 430.2/km^{2} (1,114.2/sq mi) in 2016.

== Attractions ==
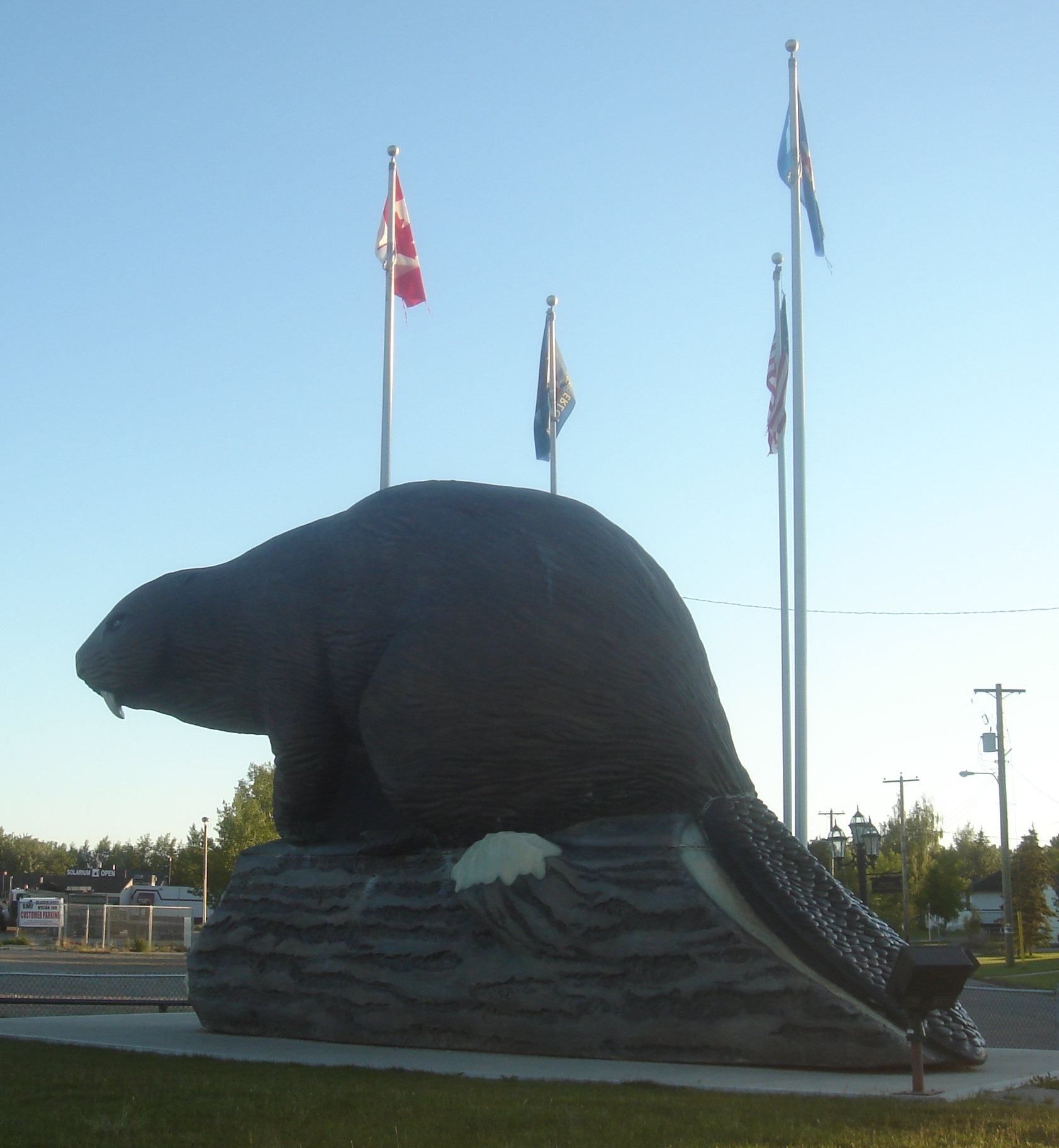
Beaver statue

In 2004, a Giant Beaver statue was unveiled in the town's park, which can be seen from Highway 43.

== Sports ==
The town is the home of the Beaverlodge Blades, a hockey team in the North West Junior Hockey League (NWJHL). The team plays out of the Beaverlodge Arena and was established in 2000.

== Amenities ==
The town has an arena, a public library, an indoor swimming pool and play parks.

== Education ==
There is an elementary school, grade K-6, Junior High students are bused to Hythe for grades 7–9, St. Mary's Catholic School is available for students attending grades 1–9. The high school, Beaverlodge Regional High School (BRHS), is attended by students from Wembley, Valhalla, Hythe, Horse Lakes No. 152B (Indian reserve), Kelly Lake (Metis settlement), Elmworth and St. Mary's in addition to the local Beaverlodge students.

Northwestern Polytechnic's National Bee Diagnostic Centre is located in Beaverlodge.

== Notable people ==
- Jerry Holland, ice hockey player
- Simon Hoogewerf, middle-distance runner
- Mel Knight, politician
- Chris Schmidt, ice hockey player
- Geoff Walker, curler
- Matt Walker, ice hockey player
- Brian Walker, ice hockey player
- Euphemia McNaught, impressionist painter

== See also ==
- List of communities in Alberta
- List of towns in Alberta
- CFS Beaverlodge
- South Peace Centennial Museum
