= Kakwa =

Kakwa may refer to:

- Cacua language or Kákwa, spoken in Colombia
- Kakwa language, spoken in Democratic Republic of the Congo, South Sudan, and Uganda
- Kãkwã people of Vaupés, Colombia
- Kakwa people of Central Africa
- Kakwa Provincial Park and Protected Area in British Columbia, Canada
- Kakwa River, a river in British Columbia and Alberta, Canada
- Kakwa Wildlands Park, in Alberta Canada
