= Sturgeon Lake 154B =

Coordinates: 54°58′54″N 117°33′39″W

- Indian reserve
- Sturgeon Lake Indian Reserve No. 154B
- Location in Alberta
- First Nation: Sturgeon Lake Cree
- Treaty: 8
- Country: Canada
- Province: Alberta
- Municipal district: Greenview

Area
  - Total: 97.1 ha (240 acres)
- Time zone: UTC−06:00 (Alberta Time)

Sturgeon Lake 154B is an Indian reserve of the Sturgeon Lake Cree Nation in Alberta, located within the Municipal District of Greenview No. 16. It is 4 kilometres south of Sturgeon Lake.
