= Williamson Provincial Park =

Provincial park in Alberta, Canada

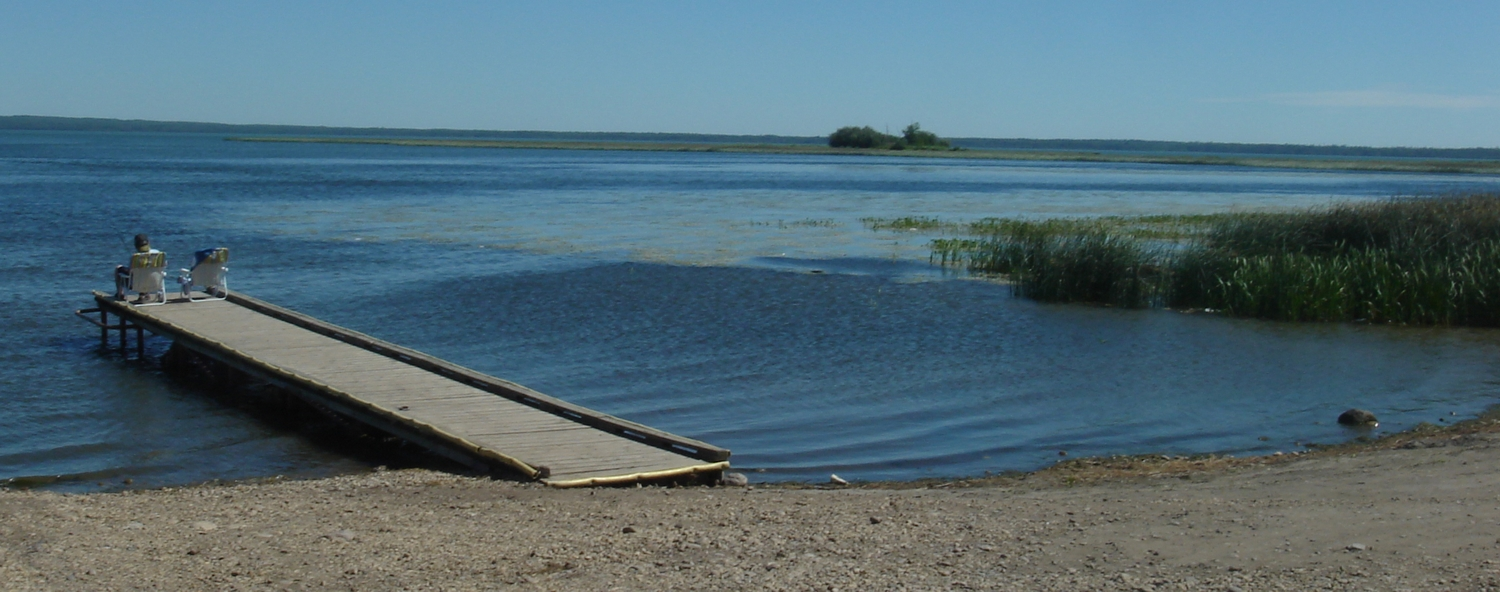
- Sturgeon Lake seen from Williamson Provincial Park

- Location within Alberta
- Interactive map of Williamson Provincial Park
- Location: Municipal District of Greenview No. 16, Alberta Canada
- Nearest city: Valleyview, Grande Prairie
- Coordinates: 55°04′57″N 117°33′35″W
- Area: 0.2 km^{2} (0.077 sq mi)
- Established: August 3, 1971
- Governing body: Alberta Tourism, Parks and Recreation

Williamson Provincial Park is a small provincial park in northwestern Alberta, Canada.

The park is situated on the southern shore of Sturgeon Lake, 19 km west of Valleyview on Highway 43. It lies across Sturgeon Lake from the much larger Young's Point Provincial Park.

Recreational activities in the park include swimming (a gravel beach) and boating (a standard boat launch area). Facilities for camping are also provided.

== History ==
The area was designated a provincial park in 1960, at the time it was the 40th park to be operated by Alberta Parks. It took its name from Alexander Williamson, a Scottish landowner who settled the area in the 1920s. He also was a fire ranger and a mail carrier for the area around Sturgeon Lake.

== Facilities ==
The park features the Williamson campground, with power, tap water, fire pits, and picnic tables. The park also has a boat launch, washrooms, and a playground.

== Activities ==
Activities at the park include swimming, birdwatching, fishing, boating, canoeing, and camping.

== Ecology ==
The park features many species of birds, including bonaparte's gull, bald eagle, red-necked grebe, purple finch, northern waterthrush, and hermit thrush.

== See also ==
- List of provincial parks in Alberta
- List of Canadian provincial parks
- List of National Parks of Canada
