= Landry Heights =

- Hamlet
- Location of Landry Heights Landry Heights (Canada)
- Coordinates: 55°02′36″N 118°54′34″W
- Country: Canada
- Province: Alberta
- Region: Northern Alberta
- Census division: 18
- Municipal district: Municipal District of Greenview No. 16

Government
  - Type: Unincorporated
  - Governing body: Municipal District of Greenview No. 16 Council

Population (1991)
  - Total: 114
- Time zone: UTC−06:00 (Alberta Time)
- Area codes: 780, 587, 825

Landry Heights is a hamlet in northern Alberta, Canada within the Municipal District of Greenview No. 16. It is located approximately 11 kilometres (6.8 mi) west of Highway 40 and 16 kilometres (9.9 mi) southwest of Grande Prairie.

== Toponymy ==
Landry Heights is named after Dale Landry, who purchased 320 acres of land in the area and subdivided them for sale in the 1970s.

== Geography ==
Landry Heights is 3 kilometres away from O'Brien Provincial Park. Some residential lots within the hamlet border the Wapiti River.

== History ==
Immigrant settlers first established a presence in Landry Heights around the year 1931. Residents cut a road to the settlement themselves, which is located atop a steep hill. The route was dangerous, owing to its narrow width and hairpin turns. In the 1960s, resident Albin Jacobson voluntarily drained the road every spring using a spade. The road was rebuilt in 1964.

In the early 1960s, John "Dale" Armont Landry (1937 – 2008) and his wife Mona relocated with their children to Grovedale for work. In 1966, the Landry family purchased an acre of land in the area that would become Landry Heights from Enos Kyle, who ran a coffeehouse atop the hill. The next year, Landry began a contracting business based in Grovedale.

In 1974, Landry bought an additional 320 acres of land from Albin and Art Jacobson. He received approval to subdivide this land in the fall of 1976. Plots became available for purchase the next year. Upon Landry's death in 2008, residents of Grovedale recalled that Landry often sold land he owned to his employees for "next to nothing," to assist them financially.

Landry Heights, named after Dale, became a hamlet in 1980.

== Governance ==
Landry Heights falls within the Municipal District of Greenview No. 16. The hamlet primarily consists of self-serviced lots.

=== Amenities ===
As of 2022, residents can access postal, grocery and fire services through nearby Grovedale, which is around 5 kilometres away. The proximity of Landry Heights to O'Brien Provincial Park provides access to outdoor recreation.

== Demographics ==
Landry Heights recorded a population of 114 in the 1991 Census of Population conducted by Statistics Canada. As of 2022, Landry Heights comprises around 50 residential lots.

== See also ==
- List of communities in Alberta
- List of hamlets in Alberta
