= Sturgeon Lake Cree Nation =

First Nations band government in Northern Alberta, Canada

- Band No. 455
- ᓇᒣᐢ ᓵᑲᐦᐃᑲᐣ namês sâkahikan CAa-Deny
- People: Cree
- Treaty: Treaty 8
- Headquarters: Sturgeon Lake
- Province: Alberta

Land
- Main reserve: Sturgeon Lake 154
- Reserves: Sturgeon Lake 154A; Sturgeon Lake 154B
- Land area: 156.645 km^{2} (60.481 sq mi)

Population (2019)
- On reserve: 1505
- On other land: 43
- Off reserve: 1918
- Total population: 3466

Government
- Chief: Sheldon Sunshine
- Council size: 6

Tribal Council
- Western Cree Tribal Council

Website
- sturgeonlake.ca

The Sturgeon Lake Cree Nation (Cree: ᓇᒣᐢ ᓵᑲᐦᐃᑲᐣ, namês sâkahikan) is a First Nations band government or "band", part of the Cree ethnic group, a member of the Western Cree Tribal Council, and a party to Treaty 8. The band controls three Indian reserves, the large Sturgeon Lake 154 and the smaller 154A and 154B. It is based on the shores of Sturgeon Lake, around Calais, west of Valleyview, in the M.D. of Greenview in the Peace Country of Northern Alberta. The registered population of the band is 3,064, of those 1,407 are on the band's own reserves.

== Notable people ==
- Tanya Kappo, Indigenous rights activist
