= Sturgeon Lake 154A =

Coordinates: 55°07′40″N 117°27′45″W

- Indian reserve
- Sturgeon Lake Indian Reserve No. 154A
- Location in Alberta
- First Nation: Sturgeon Lake Cree Nation
- Treaty: 8
- Country: Canada
- Province: Alberta
- Municipal district: Municipal District of Greenview No. 16

Area
  - Total: 753.1 ha (1,861 acres)

Population (2016)
  - Total: 53
  - Density: 7.0/km^{2} (18/sq mi)
- Time zone: UTC−06:00 (Alberta Time)

Sturgeon Lake 154A is an Indian reserve of the Sturgeon Lake Cree Nation in Alberta, located within the Municipal District of Greenview No. 16. It is 45 kilometres southwest of High Prairie. In the 2016 Canadian Census, it recorded a population of 53 living in 15 of its 16 total private dwellings.
