= Calais, Alberta =

Coordinates: 55°04′25″N 117°29′51″W

Location of Calais, Alberta

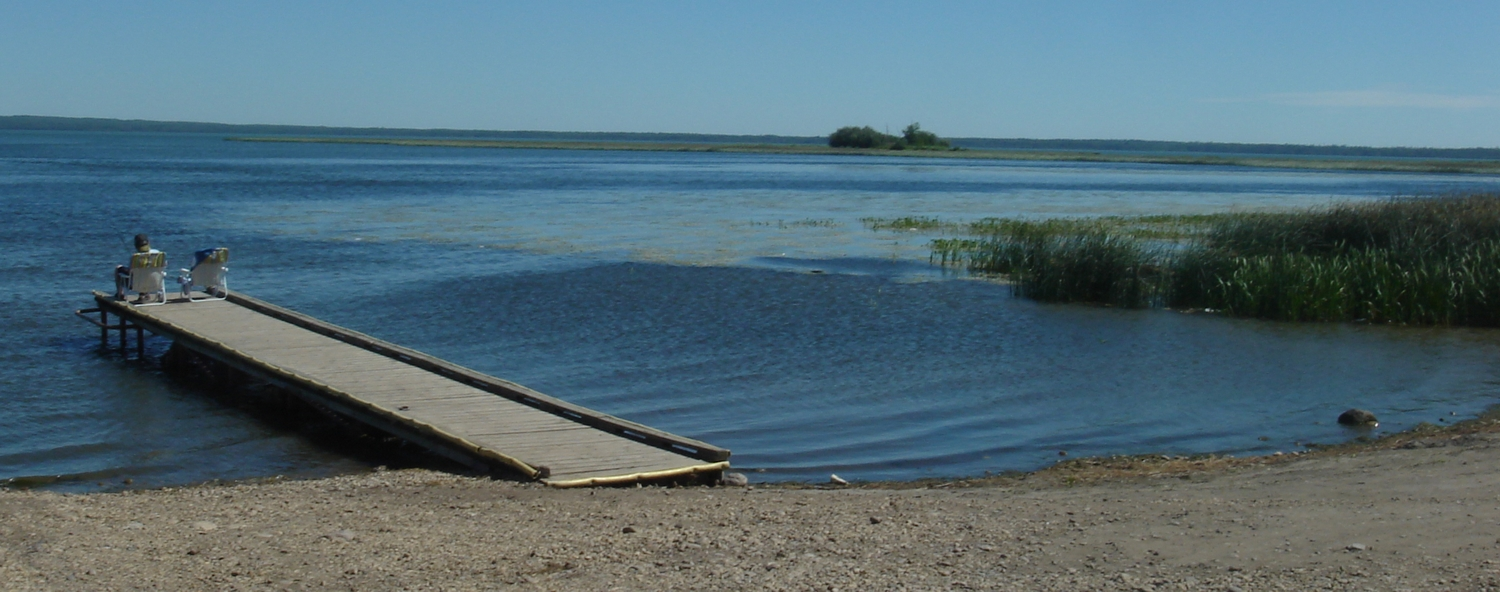
Sturgeon Lake

Calais is an unincorporated community in northern Alberta, on the south shore of Sturgeon Lake, surrounded by the Sturgeon Lake Cree Nation in the Municipal District of Greenview No. 16. It is located 0.5 kilometres (0.31 mi) north of Highway 43, 83 kilometres (52 mi) east of Grande Prairie.

The community was named after Father Jean-Baptiste Calais, the founder of the Roman Catholic mission at Sturgeon Lake.
