= Grovedale, Alberta =

Grovedale
- Hamlet
- Location in M.D. of Greenview Location in Alberta Grovedale (Canada) Grovedale (North America)
- Coordinates: 55.0278°N 118.8594°W
- Country: Canada
- Province: Alberta
- Planning region: Upper Peace
- Municipal district: Greenview

Government
  - Type: Unincorporated
  - Governing body: Municipal District of Greenview No. 16 Council

Area
  - Total: 1.82 km^{2} (0.70 sq mi)

Population
  - Total: 138
  - Density: 75.8/km^{2} (196/sq mi)
- Time zone: UTC−06:00 (Alberta Time)

Grovedale is a hamlet in northern Alberta, Canada within the Municipal District of Greenview No. 16. It is located on Highway 666 south of Grande Prairie. It is just south of the Wapiti River valley, amidst farmland and ranchland at the northern limits of the boreal forests and aspen parkland in the foothills of the Canadian Rockies.

== History ==
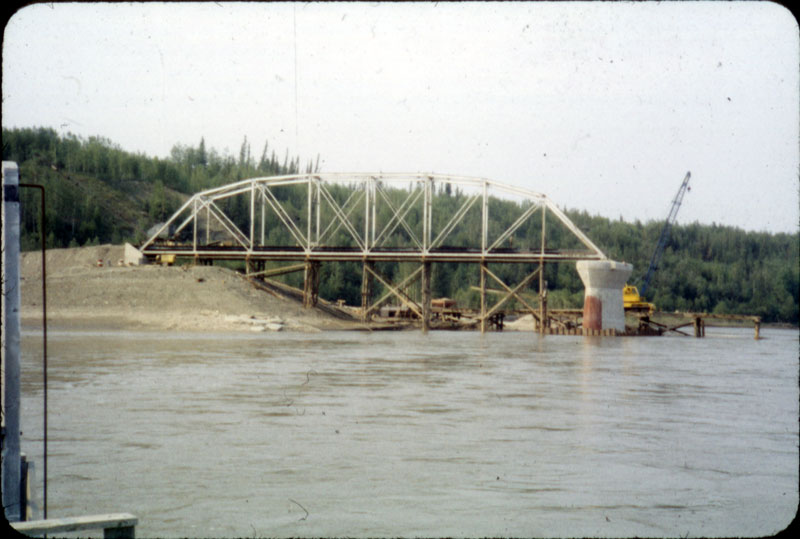
Building the bridge over the Wapiti River

- 1928: William and Mary Gabler settle in Grovedale.
- 1934: Ferry service commences by donations. T.E. Cooke owned and operated the ferry. A ferryman's house was built on the bank and occupied by Otto Sorely from 1934 to 1945. He was paid with food and supplies from the people who used the ferry, as there was no government wage.
- 1939: Post office and general store open. Farmers start growing alfalfa in their fields.
- 1945: First school opened with a class of 14 children.
- 1954: O'Brien Provincial Park was created and named after Dr. L.J. O'Brien, Grovedale's first forest ranger in 1932.
- 1958: Electrical lines reach Grovedale.
- 1958: Bridge crossing the Wapiti River opens. Ribbon cutting was held on 28 November 1958. Lumber companies had erected bridges in the past, but each spring they were swept away. Proponents of the bridge promoted the importance of it in the development of a short truck-route link with Vancouver and the United States.
- 1963: Another school comes to Grovedale, from a small community 9 kilometres south of Grovedale.
- 1960: A new two room school was built on the present site.
- 1967: The two room school was enlarged and renamed Penson Elementary School.
- 1970s: Natural gas lines reach Grovedale.
- 1975: Grovedale Community Centre was built.
- 1976: Landry Heights subdivision was approved.

== Climate ==
Climate data for Grovedale, Alberta
Month	Jan	Feb	Mar	Apr	May	Jun	Jul	Aug	Sep	Oct	Nov	Dec	Year
Record high °C (°F)	17.0 (62.6)	17.0 (62.6)	20.0 (68.0)	28.5 (83.3)	31.5 (88.7)	32.3 (90.1)	36.0 (96.8)	34.5 (94.1)	30.5 (86.9)	28.0 (82.4)	17.5 (63.5)	15.0 (59.0)	36.0 (96.8)
Mean daily maximum °C (°F)	−6.5 (20.3)	−2.6 (27.3)	2.8 (37.0)	11.0 (51.8)	17.2 (63.0)	20.6 (69.1)	23.0 (73.4)	22.2 (72.0)	16.9 (62.4)	10.5 (50.9)	−0.3 (31.5)	−4.6 (23.7)	9.2 (48.6)
Daily mean °C (°F)	−12.8 (9.0)	−9.5 (14.9)	−4.1 (24.6)	3.9 (39.0)	9.7 (49.5)	13.6 (56.5)	15.7 (60.3)	14.5 (58.1)	9.8 (49.6)	4.0 (39.2)	−5.8 (21.6)	−10.8 (12.6)	2.4 (36.3)
Mean daily minimum °C (°F)	−19.1 (−2.4)	−16.4 (2.5)	−11 (12)	−3.2 (26.2)	2.3 (36.1)	6.4 (43.5)	8.4 (47.1)	6.8 (44.2)	2.6 (36.7)	−2.6 (27.3)	−11.3 (11.7)	−17 (1)	−4.5 (23.9)
Record low °C (°F)	−49 (−56)	−48 (−54)	−48.5 (−55.3)	−29 (−20)	−10 (14)	−3 (27)	−3 (27)	−4.5 (23.9)	−11.5 (11.3)	−35.5 (−31.9)	−37.5 (−35.5)	−45 (−49)	−49 (−56)
Average precipitation mm (inches)	36.3 (1.43)	22.2 (0.87)	23.8 (0.94)	24.9 (0.98)	42.9 (1.69)	68.1 (2.68)	76.1 (3.00)	56.5 (2.22)	46.2 (1.82)	27.9 (1.10)	31.2 (1.23)	22.2 (0.87)	478.2 (18.83)
Average rainfall mm (inches)	1.7 (0.07)	1.0 (0.04)	1.8 (0.07)	13.7 (0.54)	39.4 (1.55)	68.1 (2.68)	76.1 (3.00)	56.5 (2.22)	45.2 (1.78)	15.4 (0.61)	5.1 (0.20)	0.7 (0.03)	324.7 (12.78)
Average snowfall cm (inches)	35.0 (13.8)	22.0 (8.7)	22.0 (8.7)	11.0 (4.3)	4.0 (1.6)	0.0 (0.0)	0.0 (0.0)	0.0 (0.0)	1.0 (0.4)	13.0 (5.1)	26.0 (10.2)	22.0 (8.7)	156.0 (61.4)
Source: Environment Canada

== Demographics ==
The population of Grovedale according to Alberta Transportation's Basic Municipal Transportation Grant funding program is 138.

== See also ==
- List of communities in Alberta
- List of hamlets in Alberta
