= Sturgeon Lake 154 =

Indian reserve in Alberta, Canada

Coordinates: 55°03′N 117°26′W

Location of Sturgeon Lake 154, Alberta

Sturgeon Lake 154 is an Indian reserve of the Sturgeon Lake Cree Nation in northern Alberta, Canada that is surrounded by the Municipal District of Greenview No. 16. It is 85 km (53 mi) east of the City of Grande Prairie at an elevation of 700 m (2,300 ft).

== Geography ==
The locality of Sturgeon Lake is on the Sturgeon Lake 154 reserve. The reserve is 3.5 km (2.2 mi) west of the Town of Valleyview on Highway 43.
