= Improvement District No. 25 =

Improvement district in Alberta, Canada

Improvement District No. 25 Improvement District No. 25 (Willmore Wilderness)
- Improvement district
- Location within Alberta
- Coordinates: 53°41′N 119°8′W
- Country: Canada
- Province: Alberta
- Region: Central Alberta
- Census division: No. 14
- Established: January 2, 1994

Government
  - Governing body: Alberta Municipal Affairs (AMA)
  - Minister of AMA: Ric McIver
  - CAO: Troy Shewchuk
  - MLA: Martin Long

Area (2021)
  - Land: 4,601.52 km^{2} (1,776.66 sq mi)

Population (2021)
  - Total: 0
  - Density: 0/km^{2} (0/sq mi)
- Time zone: UTC−06:00 (Alberta Time)

Improvement District No. 25, or Improvement District No. 25 (Willmore Wilderness), is an improvement district in Alberta, Canada. Coextensive with Willmore Wilderness Park in central Alberta, the improvement district provides local governance for lands within the park.

== History ==
Prior to 1994, those lands within Improvement District (ID) No. 25 were split between ID No. 14 and ID No. 16. Those lands within Willmore Wilderness Park were incorporated as ID No. 25 on January 2, 1994.

== Geography ==
=== Communities ===
There are no urban municipalities, hamlets, or urban service areas within Improvement District No. 25.

== Demographics ==
In the 2021 Census of Population conducted by Statistics Canada, Improvement District No. 25 had a population of 0 living in 0 of its 0 total private dwellings, no change from its 2016 population of 0. With a land area of 4,601.52 km^{2} (1,776.66 sq mi), it had a population density of 0.0/km^{2} (0.0/sq mi) in 2021.

Improvement District No. 25 was unpopulated and had no private dwellings according to the 2016 Census of Population conducted by Statistics Canada. It had a land area of 4,605.63 square kilometres (1,778.2 sq mi) in 2016.

== Government ==
Improvement District No. 25 is governed by Alberta's Minister of Municipal Affairs.

== See also ==
- List of communities in Alberta
