= Alberta Highway 666 =

Highway in Alberta, Canada

Highway 666

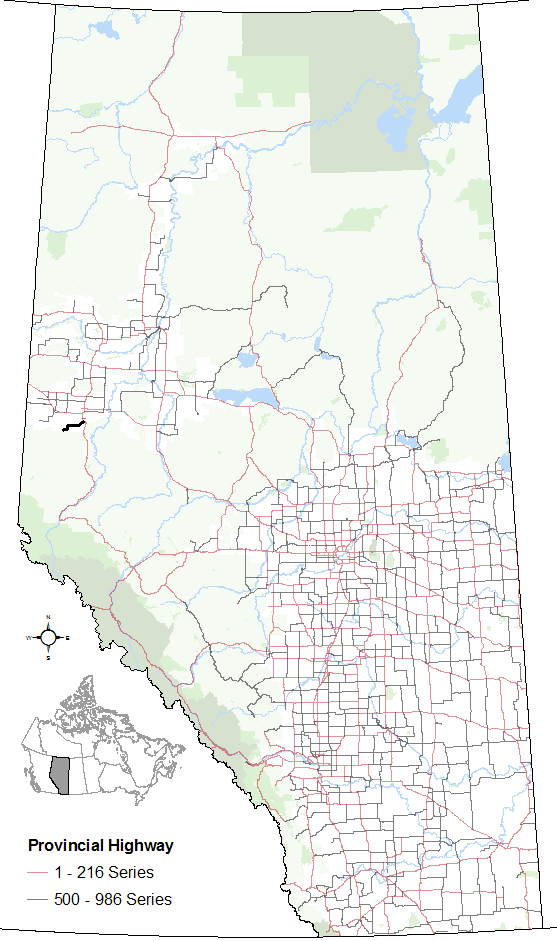

Route information
- Maintained by Alberta Transportation
- Length: 36.85 km (22.90 mi)

Major junctions
- West end: Creek crossing on Range Road 85
- East end: Highway 40 south of Grande Prairie

Location
- Country: Canada
- Province: Alberta
- Specialized and rural municipalities: Municipal District of Greenview No. 16

Highway system
- Alberta Provincial Highway Network; List; Former
← Highway 665	→ Highway 667

Alberta Provincial Highway No. 666, commonly referred to as Highway 666, is a highway in the province of Alberta, Canada. It runs mostly west-east, on mostly existing township and range roads in the Municipal District of Greenview No. 16 in Northern Alberta, for 37 km.

== Route description ==
The highway starts on Range Road 85 at a creek crossing. South of this point, Weyerhaeuser Canada Corporation maintains a network of forestry roads, extending approximately 100 km (62 mi) south to the Two Lakes Provincial Park and Nose Mountain camping areas, and further to the 30 m (98 ft) high Kakwa Falls on the Kakwa River. Highway 666 travels north east on Township Road 692, Range Road 82, and Township Road 700, to the hamlet of Grovedale. It then follows the south bank of Wapiti River, with O'Brien Provincial Park in between, before meeting up with Highway 40. The Highway 40 bridge over Wapiti River south of Grande Prairie also crosses Highway 666, and with separate northbound and southbound exits to Hwy 666, it makes a Trumpet/Directional-T hybrid.

It is used by forestry and the oil and gas industry working in the area of the Wapiti River valley, as well as for recreational use (two summer campgrounds are open in this wilderness area). It is paved for its entire length.

== Major intersections ==
Starting from the west end of Highway 666:

Rural/specialized municipality	Location	km	mi	Destinations	Notes
Continues as Two Lakes Road towards Two Lakes Provincial Park
M.D. of Greenview No. 16		0	0.0	Creek	Western terminus 54.95083°N 119.19556°W
M.D. of Greenview No. 16	Grovedale	29	18	Range Road 64, Township Road 700	Hwy 666 branches north 55.02333°N 118.86528°W
M.D. of Greenview No. 16		32	20	Road – O'Brien Provincial Park	55.05500°N 118.85750°W
M.D. of Greenview No. 16		36	22	Highway 40 – Grande Prairie, Grande Cache, Hinton	Partially grade separated; eastern terminus 55.07167°N 118.79611°W
1.000 mi = 1.609 km; 1.000 km = 0.621 mi

== Gallery ==
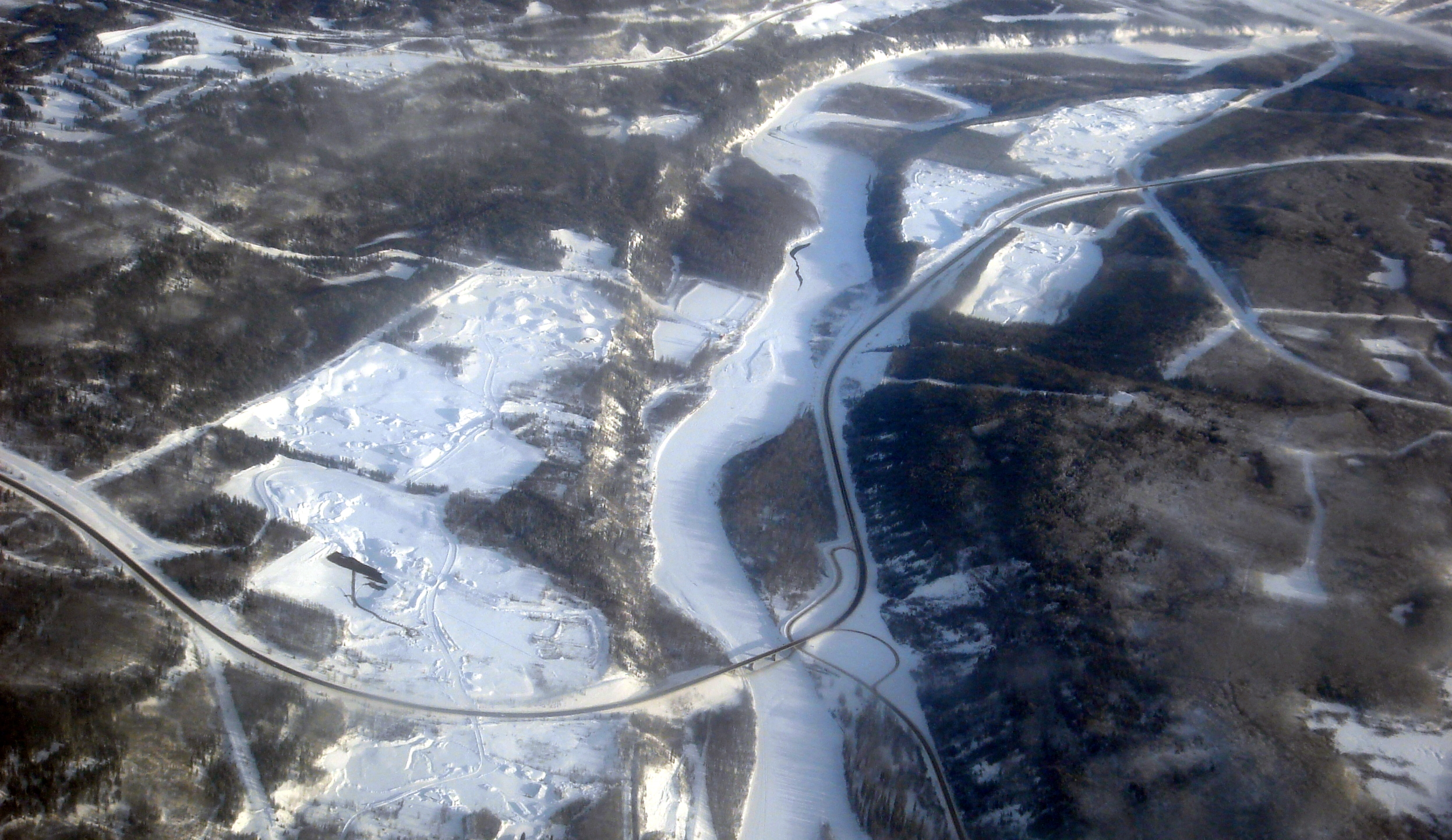
Hwy 40 bridge over Wapiti River and Hwy 666 east terminus

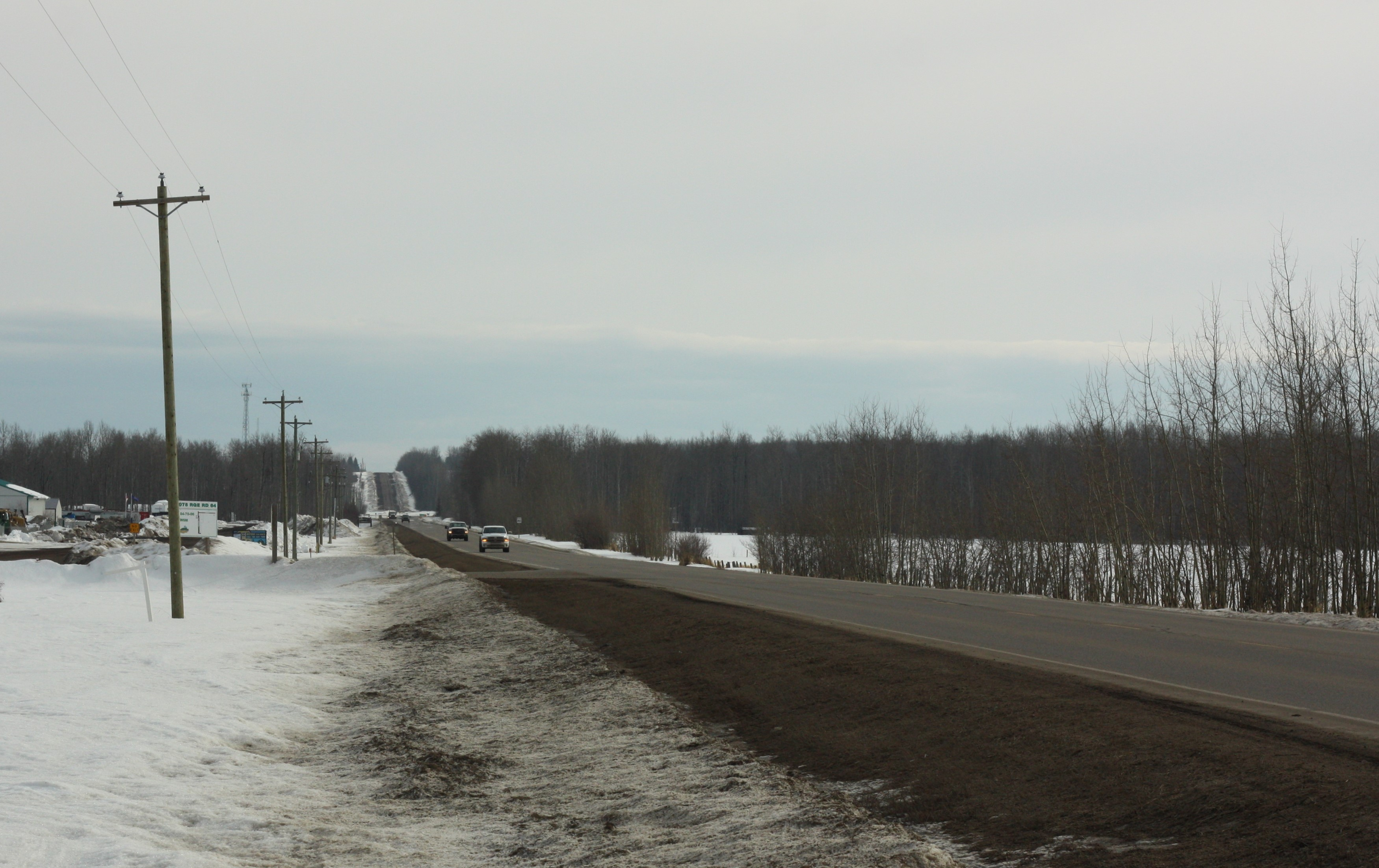
Highway 666 leading to Grovedale, Alberta

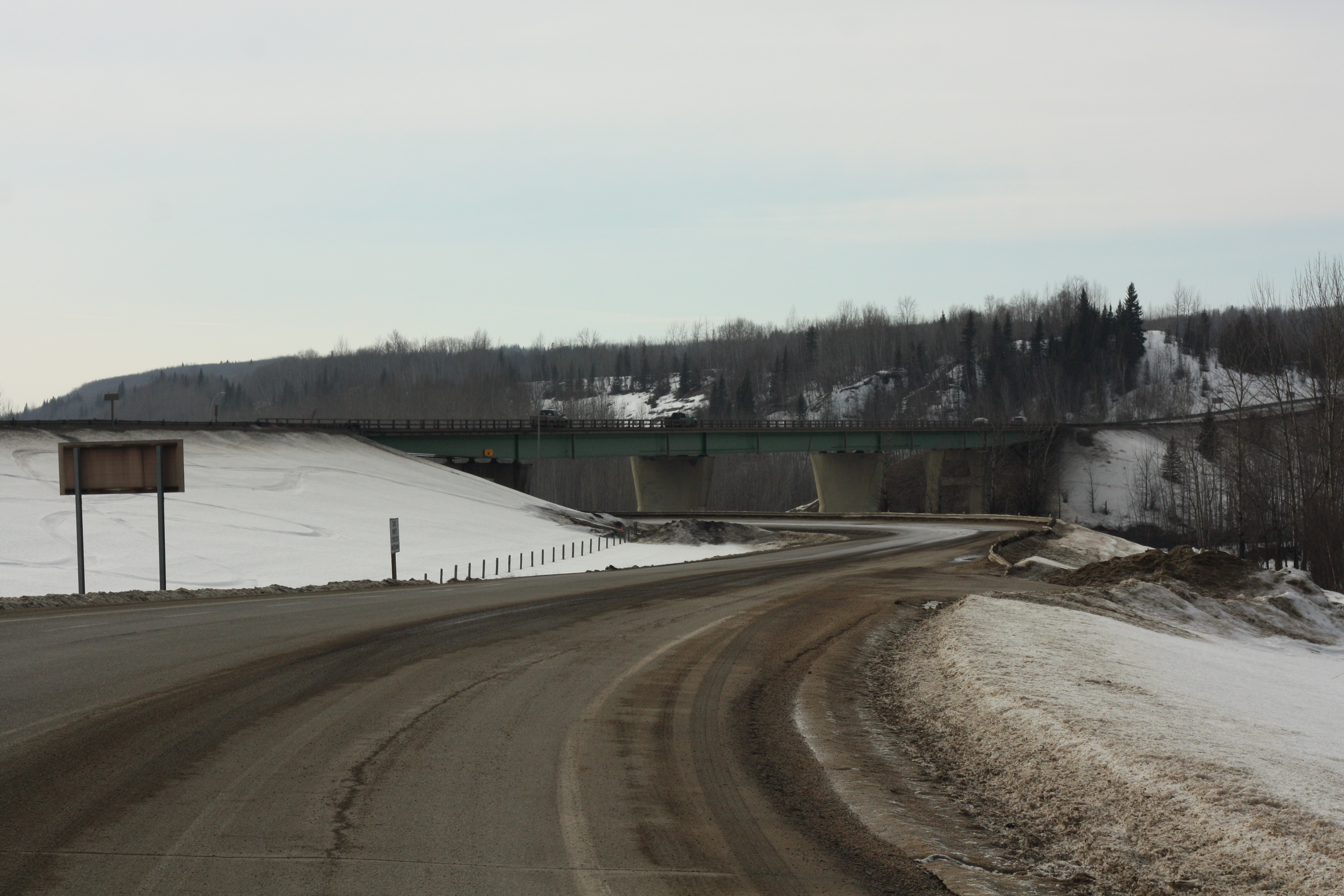
Highway 666 under the Wapiti River bridge.

== See also ==
- List of Alberta provincial highways
