= Musreau Lake (Alberta) =

Lake in Alberta, Canada

- Location within Alberta
- Location: Municipal District of Greenview No. 16, Alberta
- Coordinates: 54°33′N 118°37′W
- Primary inflows: Six inlet creeks
- Primary outflows: Musreau Creek into; Kakwa River into; Smoky River
- Catchment area: 101 km (63 mi)
- Basin countries: Canada
- Max. length: 4.2 km (2.6 mi)
- Max. width: 2.7 km (1.7 mi)
- Surface area: 5.49 km^{2} (2.12 sq mi)
- Max. depth: 13.0 m (42.7 ft)
- Shore length^{1}: 13.4 km (8.3 mi)
- Surface elevation: 871.9 m (2,861 ft)
- Settlements: Grande Prairie
- ^{1} Shore length is not a well-defined measure.

Musreau Lake is a Mesotrophic lake northwestern Alberta. The closest city is Grande Prairie, Alberta. It has Six inlet creeks and outflows out to Musreau Creek that links to the Kakwa River, then the Smoky River. A small lake directly to the west is named Little Musreau Lake connected by a short unnamed creek, both are within the Musreau Lake Provincial Recreation Area established in 1978.

== Fauna ==
There are seven different types of fish found in the lake these include; The longnose sucker (Catostomus catostomus), white sucker (Catostomus commersonii), bull trout (Salvelinus confluentus), burbot (Lota lota), rainbow trout (Oncorhynchus mykiss), northern pearl dace (Margariscus nachtriebi), and the brassy minnow (Hybognathus hankinsoni).

== Flora ==
The lake contains Water lilies, Bulrush, and Horsetail. Trees in the area are the White spruce (Picea glauca), Lodgepole pine (Pinus contorta), Black spruce (Picea mariana), and Willows.
