= DeBolt =

- Hamlet
- Location of DeBolt in Alberta
- Coordinates: 55.2217°N 118.0203°W
- Country: Canada
- Province: Alberta
- Census division: No. 18
- Municipal district: Municipal District of Greenview No. 16

Government
  - Type: Unincorporated
  - Governing body: Municipal District of Greenview No. 16 Council

Area (2021)
  - Land: 2.79 km^{2} (1.08 sq mi)
- Elevation: 640 m (2,100 ft)

Population (2021)
  - Total: 132
  - Density: 47.4/km^{2} (123/sq mi)
- Time zone: UTC−06:00 (Alberta Time)

DeBolt is a hamlet in northern Alberta, Canada within the Municipal District of Greenview No. 16. Henry DeBolt, an early postmaster, gave the community his last name.

The hamlet is located in census division No. 18.

== Geography ==
DeBolt is located in Peace Country, 58 km (36 mi) east from Grande Prairie and 54 km (34 mi) west of Valleyview along Highway 43. It lies in the Smoky River valley, at an elevation of 640 m (2,100 ft).

It gives the name to the Debolt Formation, a stratigraphical unit first described in a well located 10 kilometres (6.2 mi) north of the settlement.

== Demographics ==
Population history of DeBolt
Year	Pop.	±%
1941	29	—
1951	88	+203.4%
1956	111	+26.1%
1961	87	−21.6%
1966	66	−24.1%
1971	79	+19.7%
1976	63	−20.3%
1981	117	+85.7%
1986	106	−9.4%
1991	103	−2.8%
1991A	106	+2.9%
1996	116	+9.4%
2001	124	+6.9%
2006	128	+3.2%
2011	133	+3.9%
2016	121	−9.0%
2021	132	+9.1%
Source: Statistics Canada

In the 2021 Census of Population conducted by Statistics Canada, DeBolt had a population of 132 living in 66 of its 73 total private dwellings, a change of 9.1% from its 2016 population of 121. With a land area of 2.79 km^{2} (1.08 sq mi), it had a population density of 47.3/km^{2} (122.5/sq mi) in 2021.

As a designated place in the 2016 Census of Population conducted by Statistics Canada, DeBolt had a population of 121 living in 55 of its 78 total private dwellings, a change of −9% from its 2011 population of 133. With a land area of 2.79 km^{2} (1.08 sq mi), it had a population density of 43.4/km^{2} (112.3/sq mi) in 2016.

== Attractions ==
The Hubert Memorial Park, a collection of early buildings and artifacts, is located in DeBolt, while Legion Hall is part of the DeBolt and District Pioneer Museum.

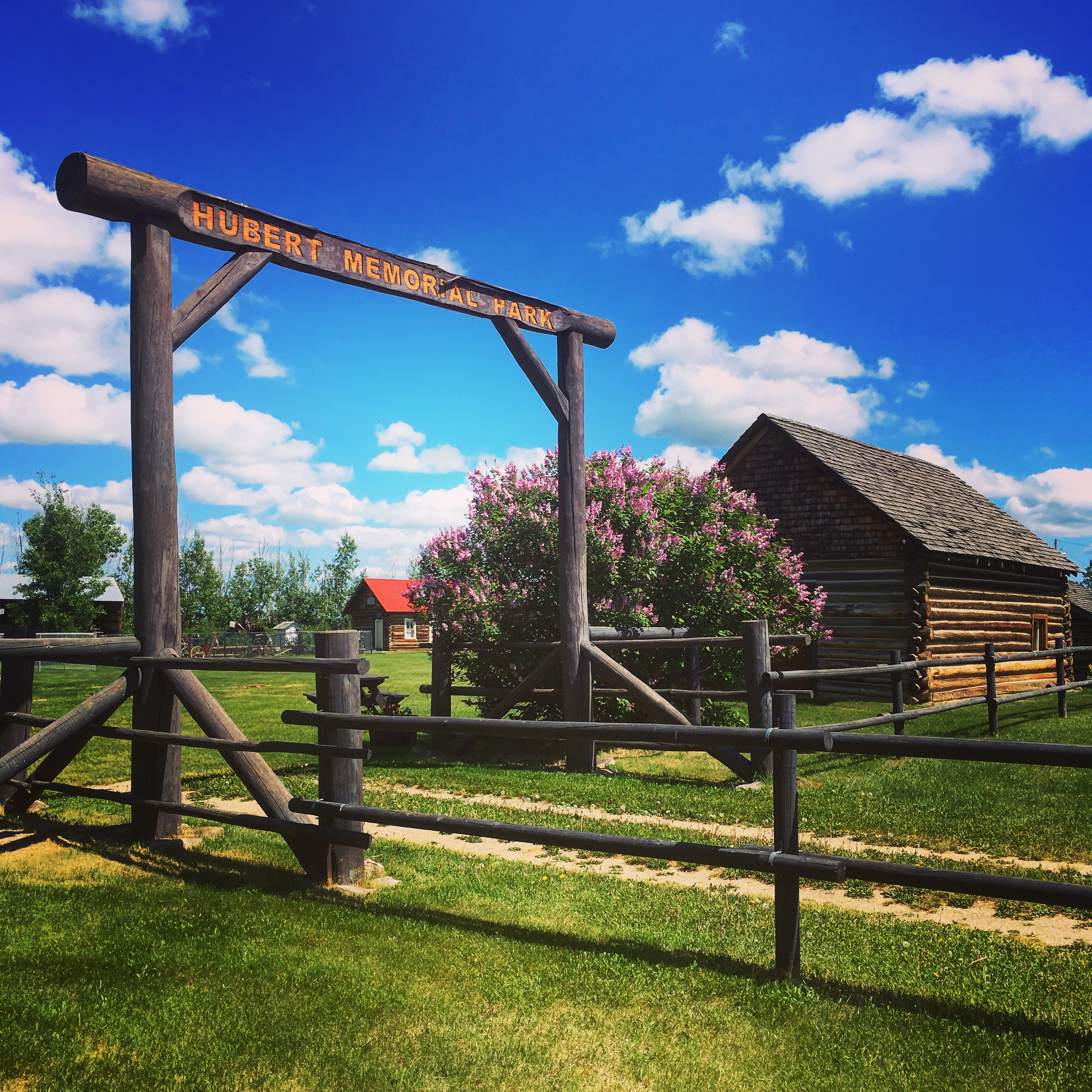
DeBolt Alberta's Hubert Memorial Park

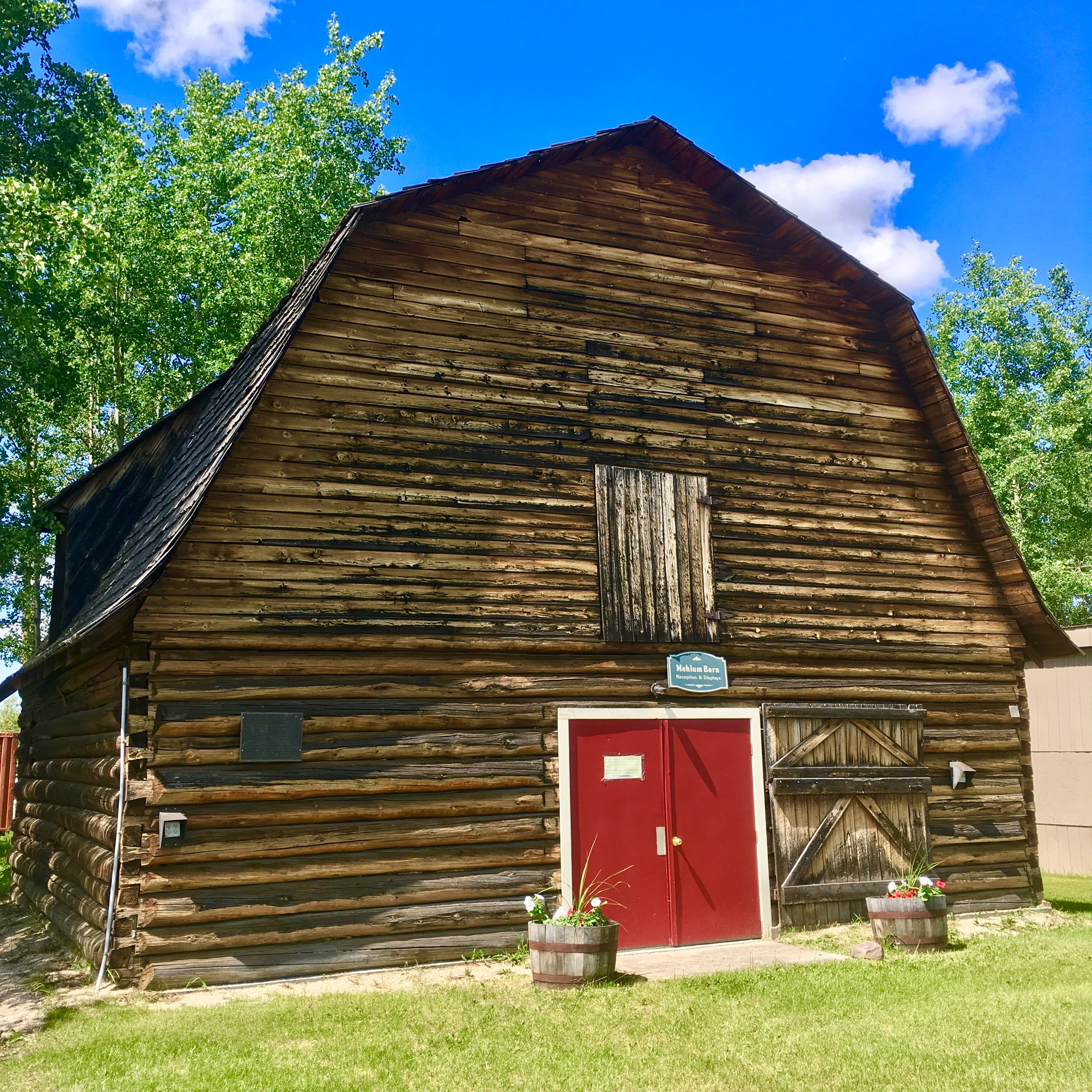
Mehlum Barn at the Hubert Memorial Park

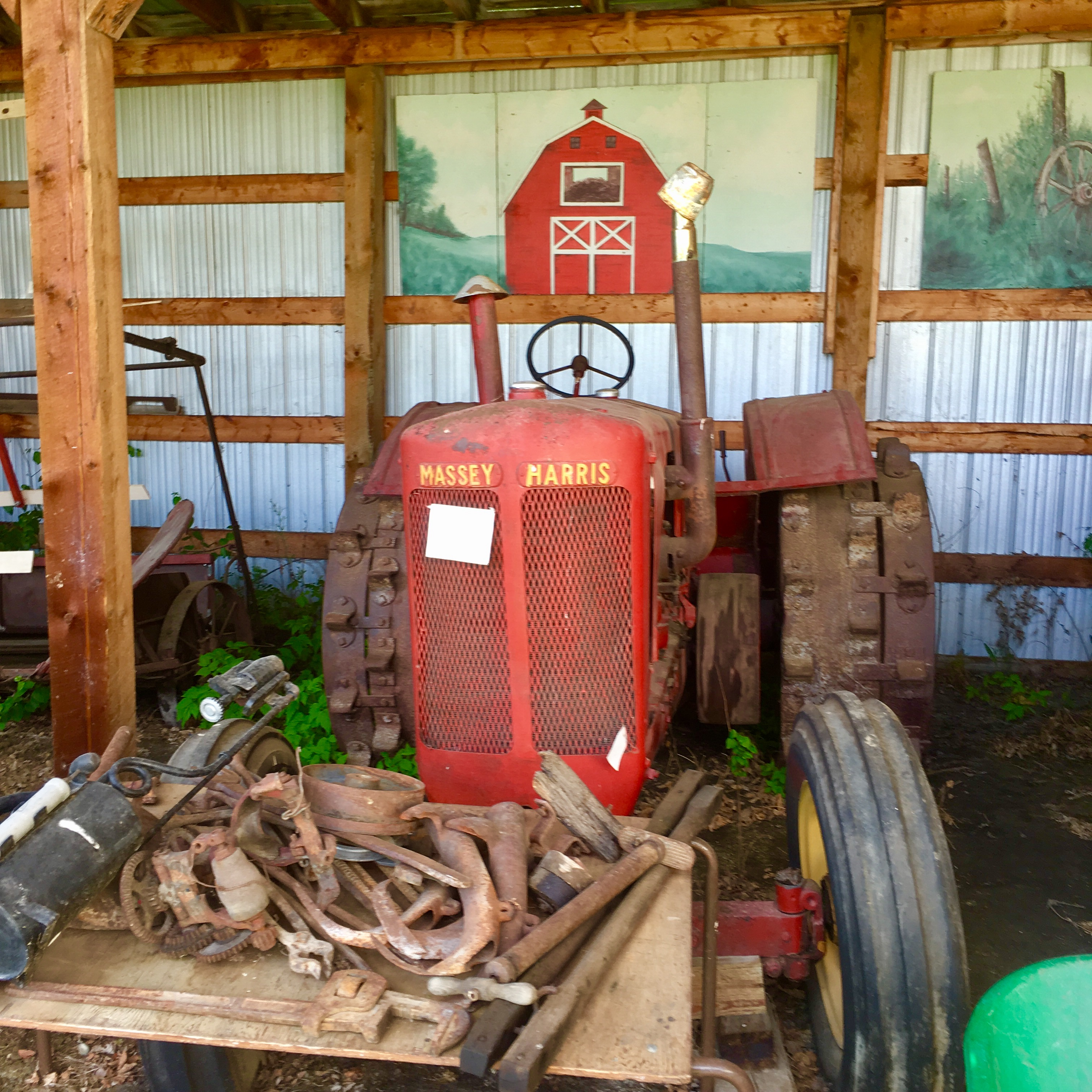
Classic tractor at the Hubert Memorial Park

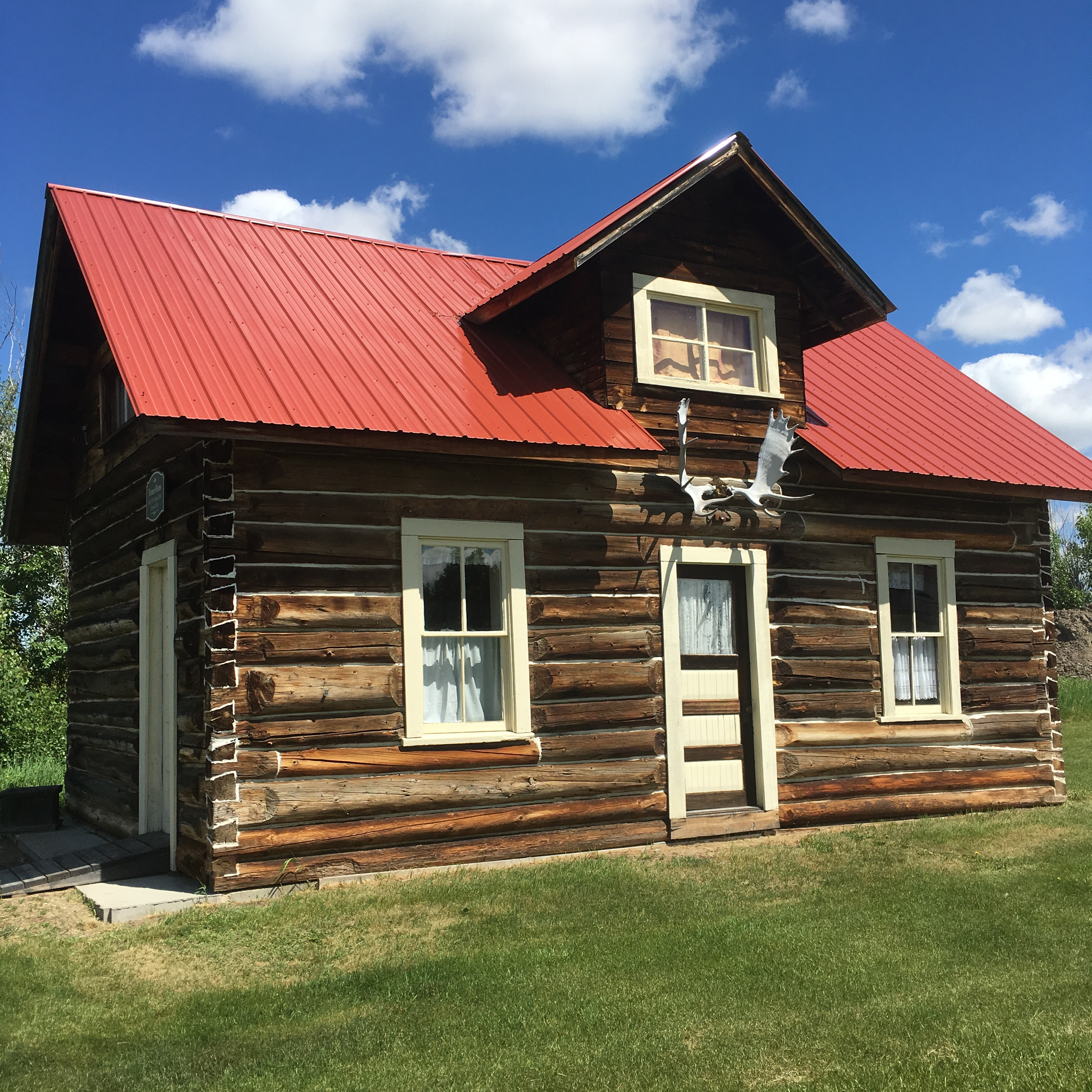
Turner Home in the Hubert Memorial Park

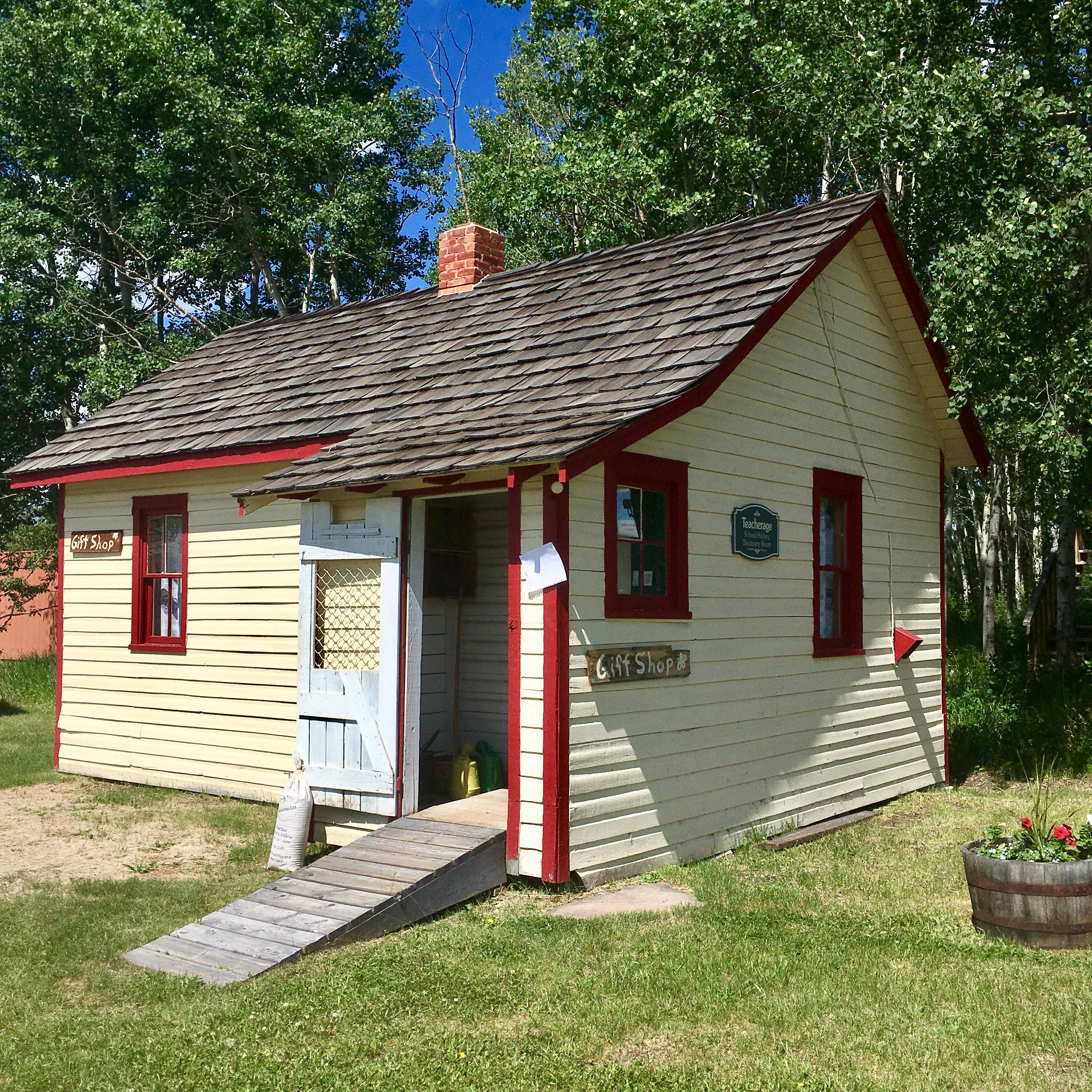
Old school house and current gift shop

== Infrastructure ==
The hamlet is served by DeBolt Aerodrome (TC LID: CFG4), located 1 NM (1.9 km; 1.2 mi) north of the community. DeBolt also has a fire hall for volunteer firefighters.

== Services ==
The community has a church, a pub, a general store with restaurant and a gas station.

== Notable residents ==
- Henry DeBolt, community namesake, and former Alberta MLA
- Ken Belford, a poet
- Marvin Moore, former Alberta MLA
- Kristie Moore, 2010 Vancouver Olympics curling silver medalist
- Roy Bickell, a fossil hunter, philanthropist, and local historian
- Georgie Collins, actress

== See also ==
- List of communities in Alberta
- List of designated places in Alberta
- List of hamlets in Alberta
