= Ridgevalley =

- Hamlet
- Location of Ridgevalley Ridgevalley (Canada)
- Coordinates: 55°09′26″N 117°53′52″W
- Country: Canada
- Province: Alberta
- Region: Northern Alberta
- Census division: 18
- Municipal district: Municipal District of Greenview No. 16

Government
  - Type: Unincorporated
  - Governing body: Municipal District of Greenview No. 16 Council

Population (1991)
  - Total: 46
- Time zone: UTC−06:00 (Alberta Time)
- Area codes: 780, 587, 825

Ridgevalley is a hamlet in northern Alberta, Canada within the Municipal District of Greenview No. 16. It is located 2.5 kilometres (1.6 mi) southwest of Highway 43, approximately 57 kilometres (35 mi) east of Grande Prairie.

== Demographics ==
Ridgevalley recorded a population of 46 in the 1991 Census of Population conducted by Statistics Canada.

== See also ==
- List of communities in Alberta
- List of hamlets in Alberta
