= Willmore Wilderness Park =

Provincial park of Alberta, Canada

- IUCN category Ib (wilderness area)
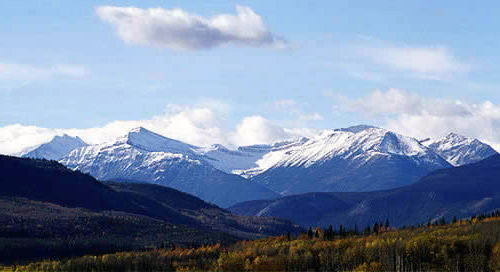
- Mount De Veber in Willmore Wilderness Park

- Location within Alberta
- Location: Alberta, Canada
- Nearest city: Grande Cache, Hinton
- Coordinates: 53°42′05″N 119°03′21″W
- Area: 4,568 km^{2} (1,764 sq mi)
- Established: April 7, 1959
- Governing body: Alberta Tourism, Parks and Recreation

Willmore Wilderness Park is a large wilderness area in west-central Alberta, Canada. It covers roughly 4,600-square-kilometre (1,800 sq mi) of undeveloped mountain and foothill terrain. The park is located along the northern boundary of Jasper National Park and includes river valleys, forested slopes, and high-elevation landscapes typical of the eastern side of the Canadian Rockies.

The park is managed with a focus on conservation and low-impact backcountry recreation. There are no public roads, bridges, or permanent facilities inside the park, although a small number of historic ranger cabins are still used for administrative or emergency purposes. Visitors mainly take part in activities such as hiking, horseback riding, fishing, skiing, and backcountry camping, all of which must be done without motorized vehicles under provincial regulations.

Willmore Wilderness Park borders Kakwa Wildland Park to the north, Kakwa Provincial Park and Protected Area in British Columbia to the west, Rock Lake Provincial Park to the southwest, and Sulphur Gates Provincial Recreation Area to the east. Together, these parks form a continuous protected mountain region that spans the border between Alberta and British Columbia.

Another staging area is found south-east of the park, in the town of Hinton.

== Toponym ==
The toponym Willmore honors Norman Willmore, a Minister of Lands and Forests who supported the creation of the park. Previously called Wilderness Provincial Park, it was renamed Willmore Wilderness Park in 1965 to commemorate him following his death in a motor vehicle accident.

== History ==
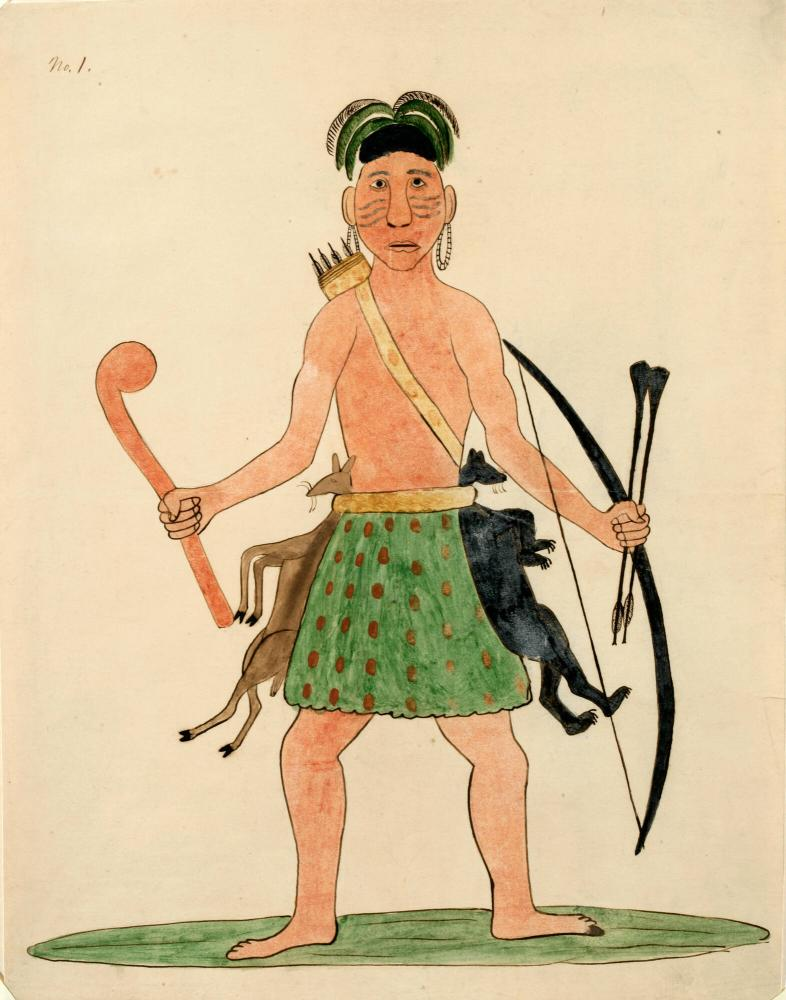

In terms of local governance, those lands within Willmore Wilderness Park were split between the Improvement District (ID) No. 14 and ID No. 16 prior to 1994. Those lands within Willmore Wilderness Park were incorporated as ID No. 25 on January 2, 1994. The park was named on April 12, 1965, after Norman Willmore of Edson, a provincial cabinet minister and member of the Legislative Assembly of Alberta who was killed in a motor vehicle accident in February 1965. It was previously known as Wilderness Provincial Park, established in 1959 through a bill introduced by Willmore.

The first Iroquois hunters arrived from the Montreal region in the 1790s to work for fur trading companies. After their contracts ended, some decided to stay and settle in the Athabasca Valley. They built friendly relations with the local Shuswap people and gradually expanded their communities into the mountain regions, Grande Prairie, and Peace River areas.

Several key families such as the Wanyandies, Karakunties, and Findlays played important roles in the area's early history. They worked as voyageurs and Freemen, trading goods and guiding others through the rugged landscape. Many of their descendants still live in the region today, preserving the Métis and Iroquois heritage of the Willmore Wilderness area.

== Geography ==
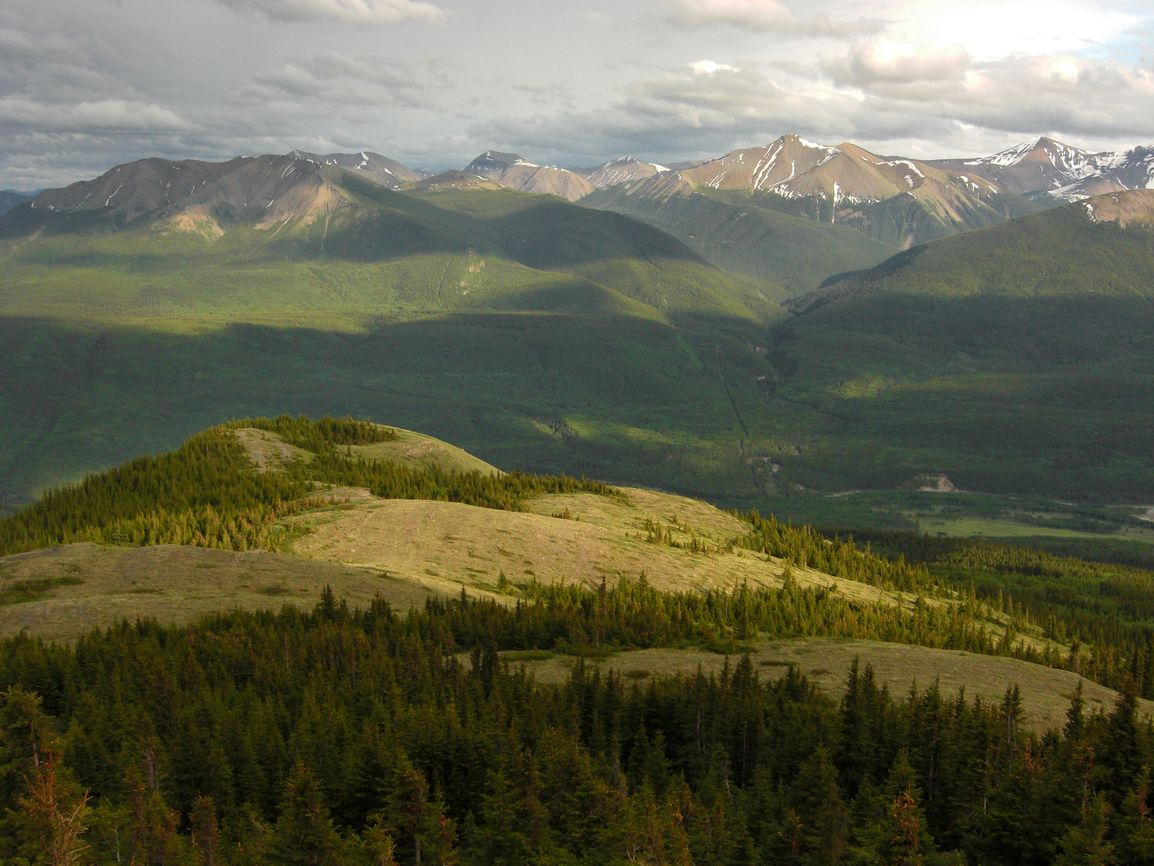
Willmore Wilderness from Mount Stearn, near Grande Cache

Willmore Wilderness Park covers approximately 4,600 square kilometres and is characterized by rugged mountainous terrain. The park contains numerous peaks that rise above 2,400 metres (8,000 ft), including Resthaven Mountain, its highest point at 3,100 metres (10,171 ft), and features glaciers, snowfields, and wide U-shaped valleys formed by long-term erosion. These landscapes also include major river systems, alpine tundra, subalpine forests of lodgepole pine and Engelmann spruce, and foothill regions that support diverse ecosystems across the park.

Located in west-central Alberta, the park lies southwest of the hamlet of Grande Cache. It borders British Columbia, Jasper National Park, Kakwa Wildland Park, and Rock Lake–Solomon Creek Wildland Park, forming part of the greater Rocky Mountain region of western Canada. The area encompasses three major physiographic units the Main Ranges, composed of ancient quartzite and carbonate layers uplifted by tectonic forces the Front Ranges, dominated by folded and faulted limestone and dolomite and the Foothills, which consist mainly of eroded sandstone and shale formations.

The topography of Willmore Wilderness Park includes high ridges, deep valleys, and extensive glacial deposits. During the Pleistocene, alpine glaciers carved cirques, horns, and steep valleys, leaving moraines and tills that define much of the current landscape. Major rivers such as the Smoky, Berland, Wildhay, and Muskeg drain the park and flow northward into the Mackenzie River system, creating a complex network of waterways shaped by both glacial and fluvial processes.

== Geology ==
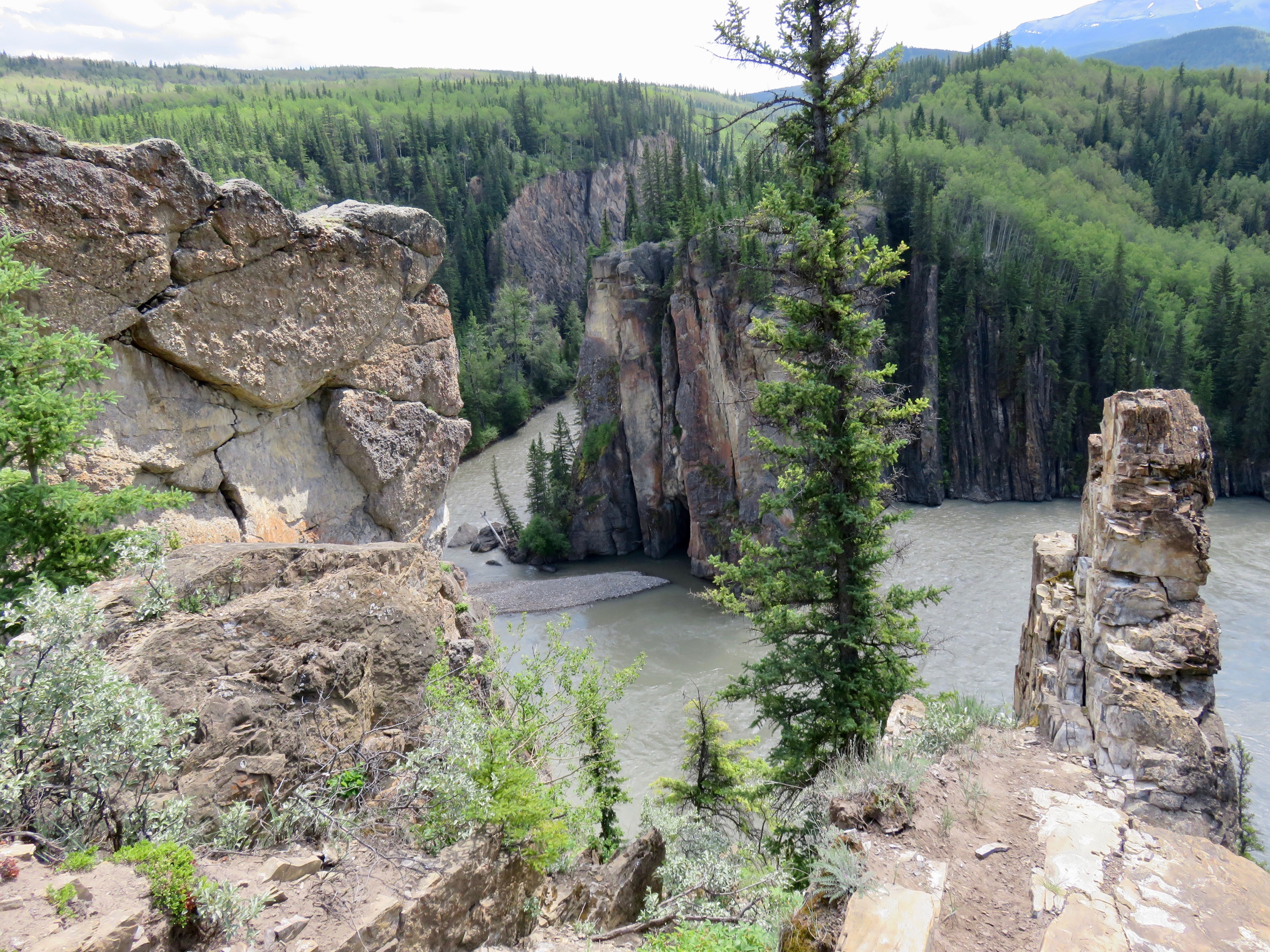
The Sulphur Gates near Grande Cache

Willmore Wilderness Park's landscape is shaped by diverse geological formations and forces. The park's terrain includes the Foothills with easily eroded sandstone and shale, the Front Ranges dominated by folded limestone and dolomite, and the Main Ranges featuring ancient quartzite and carbonate layers uplifted by tectonic movement. Its high ridges, cliffs, and deep valleys create dramatic landscapes that define the region. The park's mountains and valleys are sculpted by erosion and layered rock formations, making its landscape unique and complex.

Glacial influence is evident throughout the park, with alpine glaciers having carved many of the valleys into distinctive U-shapes and created classic glacial landforms like cirques, aretes, and cols. These natural features are shaped by glaciers, with significant deposits left behind such as moraines and tills. The rock layers show evidence of tectonic activity, contributing to the complexity of the formations seen today. The geological features here show a dynamic interaction between glacial carving and tectonic uplift.

Today, Willmore Wilderness Park holds significant geological importance. It contains dramatic cliffs and valleys composed of granite, limestone, and quartzite. The landscape is rich with unique rock formations and glacial deposits, offering insights into natural history and geological processes. It remains a valuable natural area for studying erosion, tectonic forces, and glacial shaping, preserving a pristine example of the region's geological past.

== Conservation ==
Willmore Wilderness Park is managed by Alberta Community Development as a wilderness park. Conservation-based research within the park includes:

- Willmore Biodiversity Monitoring Project
- Alberta Experimental Wolverine Monitoring Project

The park protects a large population of mountain goats and bighorn sheep (20% of the total population in Alberta). Other mammals commonly found here include grizzly bears, woodland caribou, Rocky Mountain elk, deer, cougars and northern Rocky Mountain wolves. Coyotes, wolverines, Canada lynx and black bears are also present in the sub-alpine region, while marmots, rock pika, ptarmigan and mountain goats can be found in the higher alpine areas.

The sub-alpine environment contains white spruce, lodgepole pine, balsam fir and aspen poplar.

Several First Nations burial sites are at Big Grave Flats, as well as some early coal mining, forestry and trapper cabins.

== Activities ==
Recreational activities in the park include camping, hiking, horseback riding, mountain biking, cross-country skiing and some hunting. Fishing for bull trout is allowed only in a catch-and-release fashion (9.1 kg or 20 lb bull trout have been caught on the upper part of the Jackpine River). Canoeing and whitewater rafting can be done on the Smoky River.

Motorized vehicles are prohibited within the park.

Open-pit fires are allowed.

Potential dangers while travelling through the park are changing weather (which can make rising waters dangerous to ford), lost and water-logged trails and the abundant bear population.

Several trails cross the park (Indian Trail, Pope Thoreau Trail, Great Divide Trail), and horseback riding can be done along rivers and passes (Sulphur River, West Sulphur River, Rocky Pass, Jackknife Pass, Casket Pass, Forget-Me-Not Pass, Fetherstonhaugh Pass and Morkill Pass).

Rock Lake staging area allows easy access to the north part of Jasper National Park through Willow Creek Trail. The 14 km trail joins the North Boundary Trail at about 49 km from Snake Indian River staging.

== See also ==
- List of protected areas of Alberta
- List of provincial parks in Alberta
- List of National Parks of Canada
- Cypress Hills Interprovincial Park (Alberta-Saskatchewan)
