= Mount De Veber =

Mountain in Alberta, Canada

- Mount de Veber
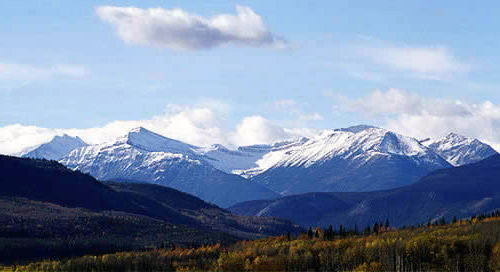

Highest point
- Elevation: 2,573 m (8,442 ft)
- Prominence: 363 m (1,191 ft)
- Listing: Mountains of Alberta
- Coordinates: 53°41′43″N 119°39′16″W

Geography
- Location within Alberta
- Country: Canada
- Province: Alberta
- Protected area: Willmore Wilderness Park
- Parent range: Front Ranges
- Topo map: NTS 83E12 Pauline Creek

Mount De Veber (sometimes spelled DeVeber or de Veber) is a mountain in Willmore Wilderness Park in Alberta, Canada. It is named for former Canadian Senator Leverett George DeVeber.
