= Young's Point Provincial Park =

Provincial park in Alberta, Canada

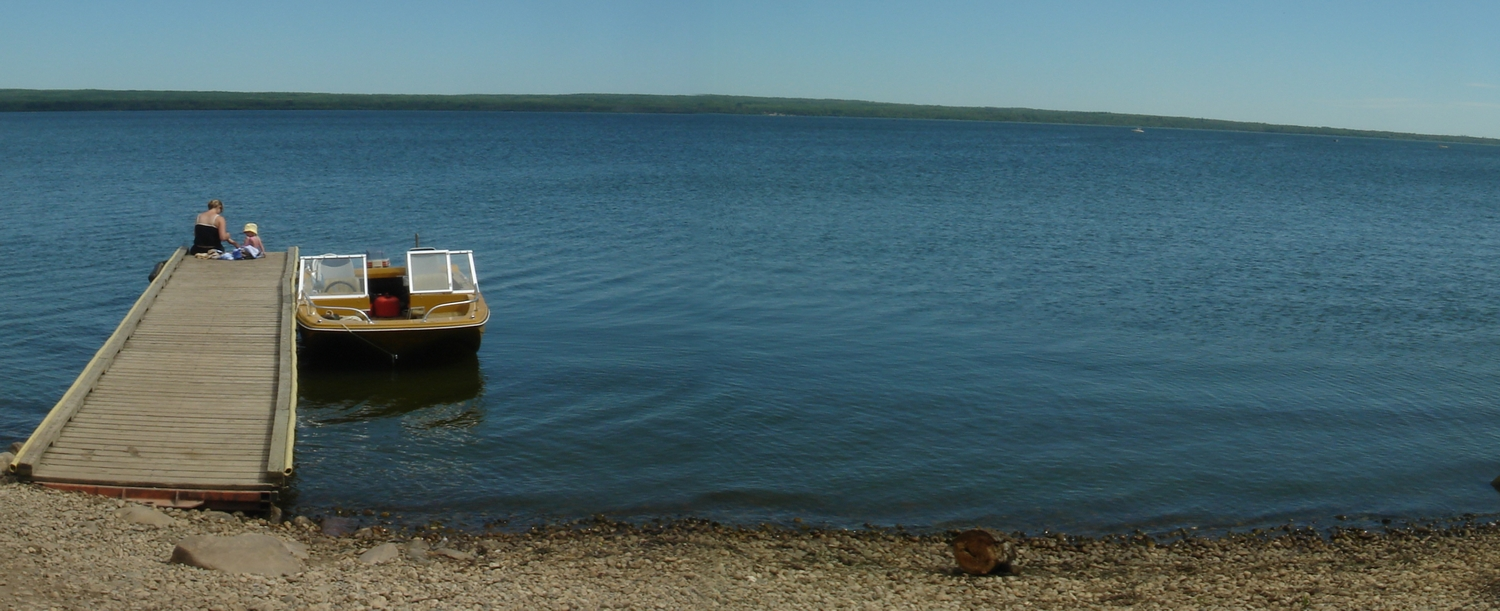
- Sturgeon Lake at Young's Point

- Location within Alberta
- Interactive map of Young's Point Provincial Park
- Location: Municipal District of Greenview No. 16, Alberta Canada
- Nearest city: Valleyview, Grande Prairie
- Coordinates: 55°08′37″N 117°34′02″W
- Area: 30.5 km^{2} (11.8 sq mi)
- Established: August 3, 1971
- Governing body: Alberta Tourism, Parks and Recreation

Young's Point Provincial Park is a provincial park located in northwestern Alberta, Canada.

It is located on the north shore of Sturgeon Lake, 23 km west of Valleyview, a short distance from Highway 43.

== History ==
The park was established on August 3, 1971, to protect the boreal forest ecosystem. The park was named after the homesteader Frederick Campbell Young, son of Elizabeth (Libby) McDougall and Harrison Young.

== Activities ==
The park has modern camping facilities, with amenities for boating, swimming, and picnic. Water activities on Sturgeon Lake include canoeing, kayaking, fishing, ice fishing, power boating, water skiing, windsurfing, and swimming. 20 km of trails are maintained for front country hiking in the summer and cross-country skiing in winter.

Fishing on Sturgeon Lake for Burbot, Iowa Darter, Lake Whitefish, Longnose Sucker, Northern Pike, Spottail Shiner, Walleye, White Sucker, and Yellow Perch.

=== Camping ===
A campground is located at Young's Point Main, along with a boat launch facility and day-use area at Young's Point Beach. Camping facilities are operational from May 1 to September 30.
