= Kakwa River =

Location
- Country: Canada

Physical characteristics
- Source
  - location: Kakwa Lake, Kakwa Provincial Park
  - coordinates: 54.03462°N 120.14526°W
  - elevation: 1,495 m (4,905 ft)
- Mouth
  - location: Smoky River
  - coordinates: 54.61372°N 118.45993°W
  - elevation: 670 m (2,200 ft)

The Kakwa River is a tributary of the Smoky River in western Alberta, Canada.

The river is named for Kakwa, the Cree word for porcupine. Porcupines are abundant in Kakwa Provincial Park and Protected Area.

Tourism along the river revolves around bull trout fishing and white water rafting. Kakwa Falls (54.10913°N 119.92350°W) are developed in the course of the river, over a 30-metre (98 ft) high ledge formed by an outcrop of the Cadomin Formation. The area was designated a protected wildland (Kakwa Wildland Park). It can be accessed through the forestry road network south of Highway 666, approximately 35 kilometres (22 mi) south of Two Lakes Provincial Park.

== Course ==
The Kakwa River originates in Kakwa Lake, north of McBride, in British Columbia, at an elevation of 1,495 metres (4,905 ft). The surrounding area is protected by Kakwa Provincial Park and Protected Area. The river flows north-east into the province of Alberta in Kakwa Wildlands Park, then flows east and north-east through the foothills. It is crossed by the Bighorn Highway before it converges into the Smoky River, at an elevation of 670 metres (2,200 ft).

== Tributaries ==
From its origins to its mouth, Kakwa River receives waters from:

- Kakwa Lake
- Cecilia Creek
- Mouse Cache Creek
- Musreau Creek
- Francis Peak Creek
- South Kakwa River
- Lynx Creek
- Ravine Creek
- Chicken Creek
- Daniel Creek
- Copton Creek
- Redrock Creek
- Route Creek
- Prairie Creek

== See also ==
- List of rivers of Alberta
