= Two Lakes Provincial Park =

Provincial park in Alberta, Canada

- Location within Alberta
- Interactive map of Two Lakes Provincial Park
- Location: Municipal District of Greenview No. 16, Alberta, Canada
- Nearest city: Grande Prairie
- Coordinates: 54°22′00″N 119°46′02″W
- Governing body: Alberta Tourism, Parks and Recreation

Two Lakes Provincial Park is a provincial park in Alberta, Canada, located 142 km (88 mi) south of Grande Prairie, 65 km (40 mi) south of Highway 666 and an additional 77 km (48 mi) south on forestry roads, where 4WD is recommended for access.

The park is situated in the foothills of Alberta's Rocky Mountains, between the two lakes called "Two Lakes", at an elevation of 1,110 m (3,640 ft).

== Activities ==
The following activities are available in the park:

- Camping (three campgrounds are available on Gunderson Trail, Moberly Trail and Pine Hollow, all without electrical or water hookups)
- Canoeing and kayaking
- Fishing and ice fishing (Brook trout)
- Front country hiking (6.3 km (3.9 mi) of trails, including Gunderson trail, Moberly trail and Pine Hollow trail)
- Horseback riding
- Boating (power vessels on south lake only)
- Wildlife watching

== See also ==
- List of provincial parks in Alberta
- List of Canadian provincial parks
- List of National Parks of Canada
