= O'Brien Provincial Park =

Provincial park in Alberta, Canada

- Location within Alberta
- Interactive map of O'Brien Provincial Park
- Location: Municipal District of Greenview No. 16, Alberta Canada
- Nearest city: Grande Prairie
- Coordinates: 55°03′49″N 118°49′28″W
- Area: 0.6 km^{2} (0.23 sq mi)
- Established: June 29, 1954
- Named for: Lewis O'Brien
- Governing body: Alberta Tourism, Parks and Recreation

O'Brien Provincial Park is a provincial park in Alberta, Canada, located 15 km (9.3 mi) south from Grande Prairie, on Highway 666.

The park is situated in the Wapiti River valley, at an elevation of 520 m (1,710 ft) and has a surface of 0.6 km^{2} (0.23 sq mi). It was established on June 29, 1954, and is maintained by Alberta Tourism, Parks and Recreation. The park is named for Lewis O'Brien, a pioneer doctor in the Grande Prairie region and former Member of the Legislative Assembly of Alberta.

== Activities ==
The following activities are available in the park:

- Canoeing and kayaking
- Fishing (Arctic grayling, bull trout, burbot, emerald shiner, fathead minnow, flathead chub, lake chub, largescale sucker, longnose dace, longnose sucker, mountain whitefish, northern pike, peamouth chub, northern pearl dace, redside shiner, slimy sculpin, spoonhead sculpin, spottail shiner, walleye, white sucker)
- Power boating
- Swimming

== See also ==
- List of provincial parks in Alberta
- List of Canadian provincial parks
- List of National Parks of Canada
