= Kakwa Wildland Provincial Park =

Provincial park in Alberta, Canada

Kakwa Wildland Park
- Kakwa Wildland Provincial Park
- IUCN category Ib (wilderness area)
- Location within Alberta
- Location: Regional Municipality of Wood Buffalo, Alberta, Canada
- Nearest city: Grande Cache
- Coordinates: 54°04′06″N 119°44′04″W
- Area: 64,928 ha (160,440 acres)
- Established: 1996
- Governing body: Alberta Tourism, Parks and Recreation

Kakwa Wildland Park is a provincial park in the Rocky Mountain Foothills just east of the northern Canadian Rockies, in Alberta, Canada, immediately east of the border with British Columbia at the 120th meridian west. The park is home to Alberta's tallest waterfall, the Kakwa Falls, which is 30 metres tall.

It adjoins Willmore Wilderness Park and British Columbia's Kakwa Provincial Park and Protected Area and together with them comprises the first interprovincial park shared between BC and Alberta.

It takes the name from kâkwa, the Cree word for porcupine.

== See also ==
- List of Alberta provincial parks
- Cypress Hills Interprovincial Park (Alberta-Saskatchewan)
