= Division No. 18, Alberta =

Census division in Canada

Coordinates: 53°53′09″N 119°07′18″W

Division No. 18
- Census division in Alberta
- Country: Canada
- Province: Alberta

Area
  - Total: 33,205 km^{2} (12,821 sq mi)
- As of 2011

Population (2021)
  - Total: 13,226
  - Density: 0.39831/km^{2} (1.0316/sq mi)

Division No. 18 is a census division in Alberta, Canada. It is located in the southeast corner of northern Alberta and its largest urban community is the Hamlet of Grande Cache. The boundaries of the division are coextensive with the outer boundaries of the Municipal District of Greenview No. 16.

== Census subdivisions ==
The following census subdivisions (municipalities or municipal equivalents) are located within Alberta's Division No. 18.

- Towns
  - Fox Creek
  - Valleyview
- Hamlets
  - DeBolt
  - Grande Cache
- Municipal districts
  - Greenview No. 16, M.D. of
- Indian reserves
  - Sturgeon Lake 154
  - Sturgeon Lake 154A

== Demographics ==
Historical population
Year	Pop.	±%
1991	13,979	—
1996	15,022	+7.5%
2001	14,346	−4.5%
2006	14,322	−0.2%
2011	14,534	+1.5%
2016	14,488	−0.3%
2021	13,226	−8.7%

In the 2021 Census of Population conducted by Statistics Canada, Division No. 18 had a population of 13,226 living in 4,999 of its 6,219 total private dwellings, a change of −8.7% from its 2016 population of 14,488. With a land area of 33,104.45 km^{2} (12,781.70 sq mi), it had a population density of 0.4/km^{2} (1.0/sq mi) in 2021.

== See also ==
- List of census divisions of Alberta
- List of communities in Alberta
