= Rocky Mountain Foothills =

Upland area in western Canada

Coordinates: 56°30′00″N 123°00′00″W

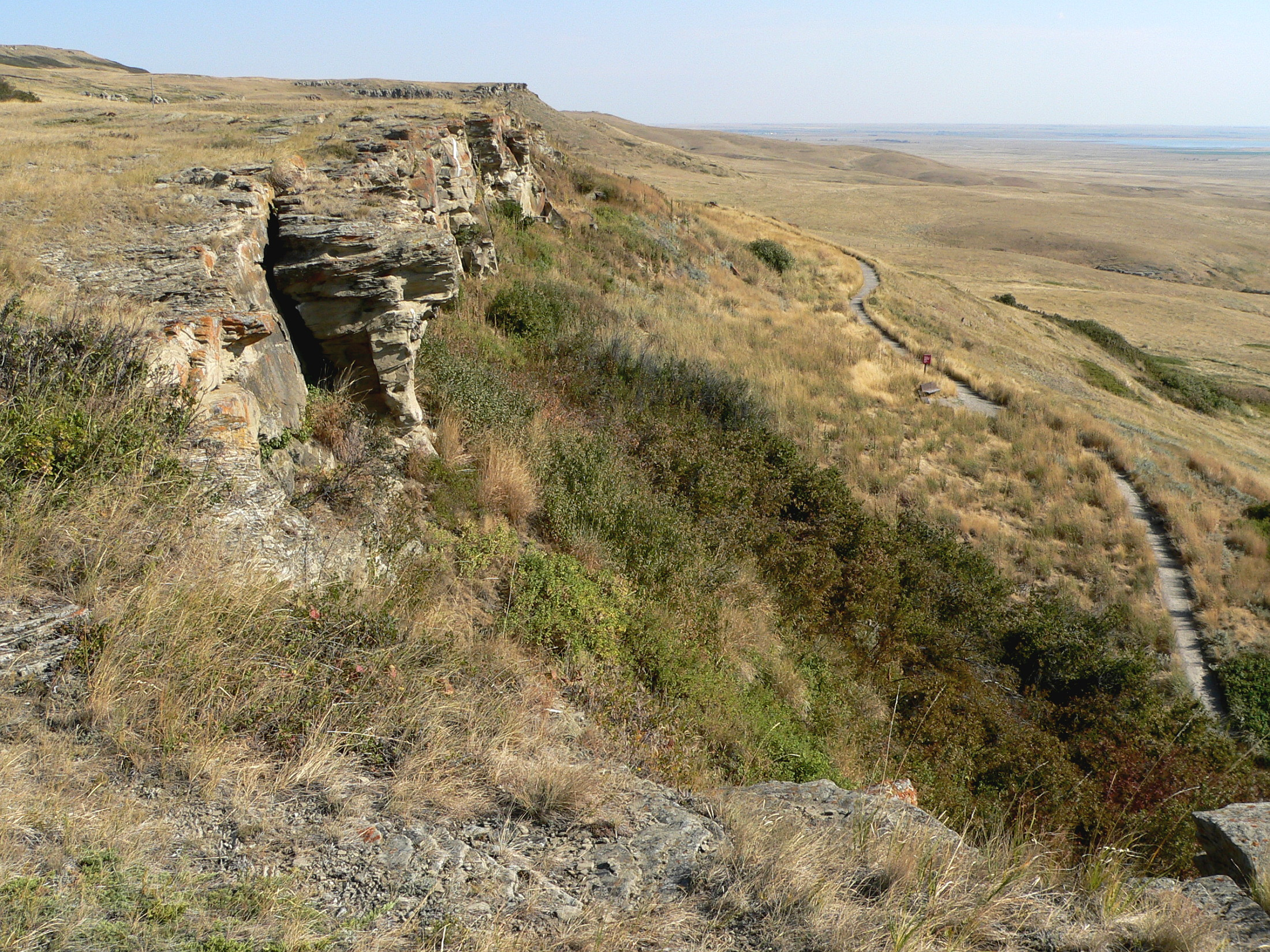
A buffalo jump located where the foothills of the Rocky Mountains begin to rise from the prairie.

The Rocky Mountain Foothills are an upland area flanking the eastern side of the Rocky Mountains, extending from the Liard River in British Columbia southward into Alberta. Bordering the Interior Plains system, they are part of the Rocky Mountain System or Eastern System of the Western Cordillera of North America.

== See also ==
- List of mountain ranges
