= Sturgeon Lake (Alberta) =

Lake in Alberta, Canada

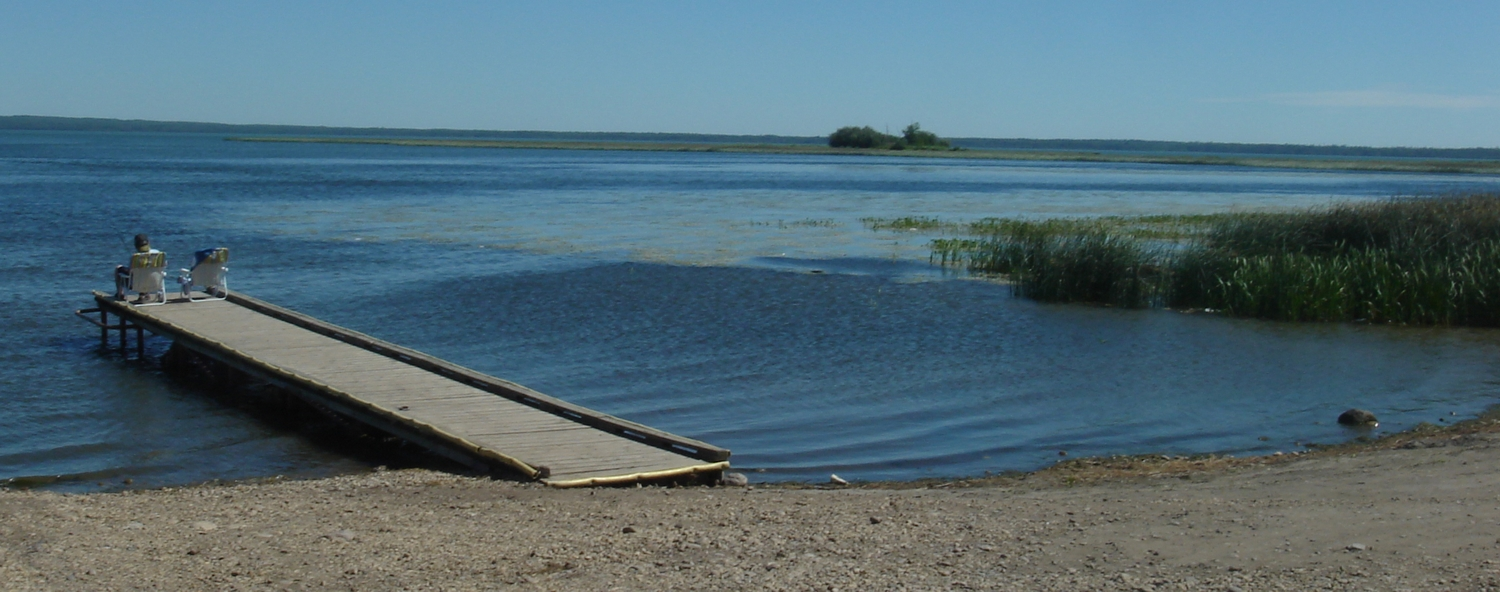
- Southern shore

- Location within Alberta
- Location: Municipal District of Greenview No. 16, Alberta
- Coordinates: 55°06′16″N 117°34′07″W
- Primary inflows: Cornwall Creek, Goose Creek
- Primary outflows: Sturgeon Creek
- Catchment area: 571 km^{2} (220 sq mi)
- Basin countries: Canada
- Surface area: 49.1 km^{2} (19.0 sq mi)
- Average depth: 5.4 m (18 ft)
- Max. depth: 9.5 m (31 ft)
- Surface elevation: 685 m (2,247 ft)
- Settlements: Sturgeon Heights

Sturgeon Lake is a lake in north-western Alberta, Canada. It has a total area of 49.1 km^{2} (19.0 sq mi) and a maximum depth of 9.5 m (31 ft). It is located in the hydrographic basin of the Little Smoky River at an elevation of 685 m, 20 km west of the town of Valleyview, along Highway 43.

Young's Point Provincial Park is located on the northern shore of the lake, and Williamson Provincial Park lies on the southern shore. The Sturgeon Lake First Nations reserve of the Sturgeon Lake Cree Nation is established on the southern shore. The hamlet of Sturgeon Heights is located at the western tip of the lake.

Just near Williamson Provincial Park is the Sturgeon Lake Campground. Sturgeon Lake Campground is a co-operative effort between M. Isley Enterprises Inc. and the Sturgeon Lake Cree Nation. It has been recently revitalized with all new washroom facilities, 50 power and water sites, 54 non-serviced sites, a group campsite, a brand new store and a playground for the kids. The campground is also the site of a giant teepee with beautiful artwork emblazoned on its sides. It is also the site of Sturgeon Lake Cree Nation Pow Wow Arbour. The arbour is where the ceremonial dances of the Sturgeon Lake Cree Nation are performed.

The waters of the lake are drained into the Little Smoky River through the 28 km (17 mi) long Sturgeon Creek.

Despite the name, the lake doesn't host any Sturgeon fish.

== Recreation ==
Sturgeon lake offers a variety of recreations opportunities. A variety of fish are available consisting of Pickerel (Walleye), Jackfish (Northern Pike), Perch, Burbot (Lingcod), White suckers & White-fish.

Boat launch sites are located on both south and north shores, as are campgrounds and day use areas.
