= Kakwa Provincial Park and Protected Area =

Provincial park in British Columbia, Canada

- IUCN category II (national park)
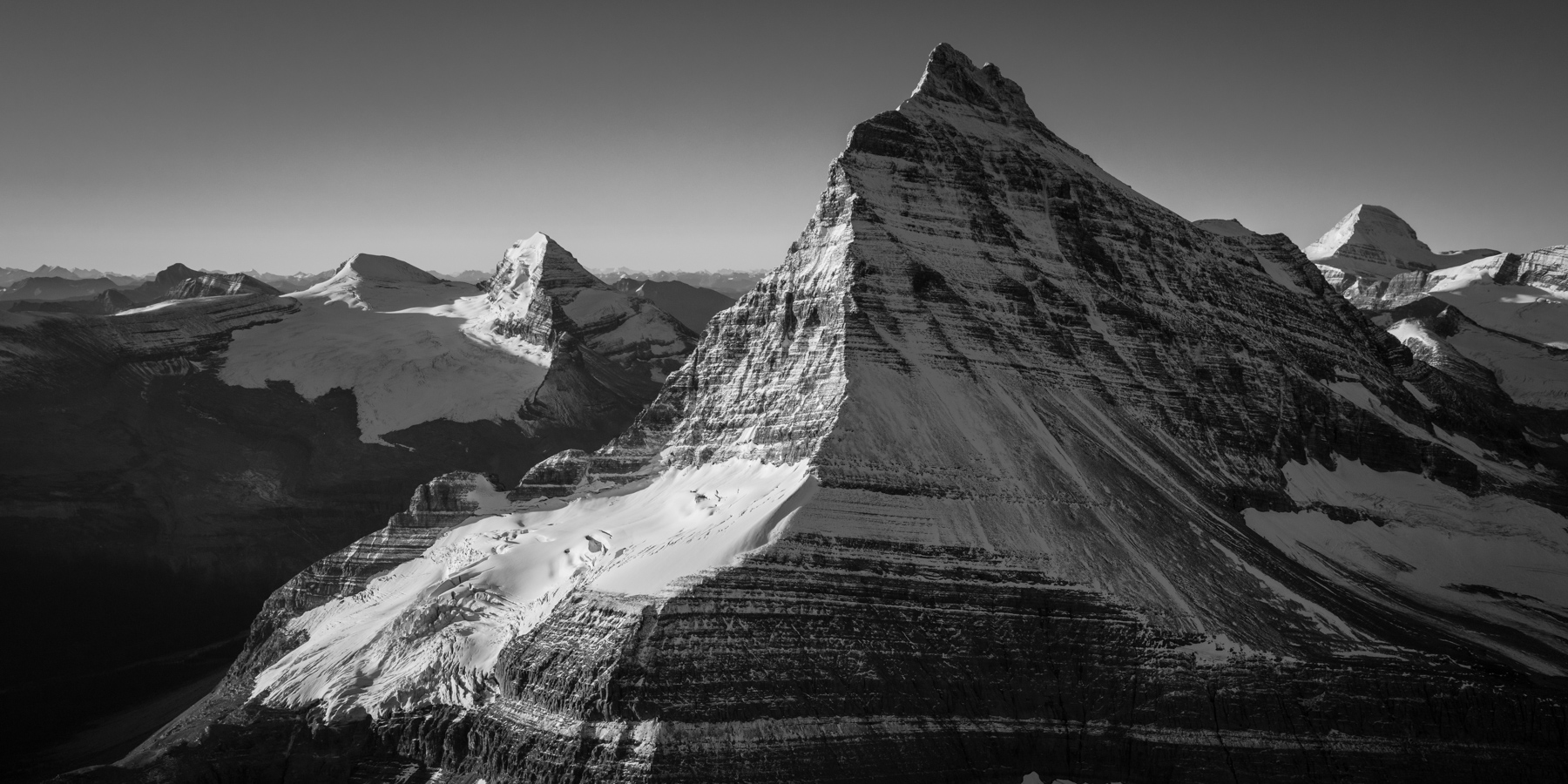
- Mount Ida, with Mounts Saint Patrick and Saint George at left, and Sir Alexander at right

- Location within British Columbia
- Interactive map of Kakwa Provincial Park and Protected Area
- Location: British Columbia, Canada
- Nearest city: Prince George
- Coordinates: 54°02′59″N 120°19′59″W
- Area: 170,890 ha (659.8 sq mi)
- Established: March 14, 1987
- Governing body: BC Parks

Kakwa Provincial Park and Protected Area is a 170,890 ha provincial park in eastern British Columbia, Canada. The park preserves the southernmost portion of the Hart Ranges and the northernmost portion of the Continental Ranges. The park also preserves significant marine fossil deposits located in the region.

== Geography ==
The Kakwa River originates in Kakwa Lake, at the core of the park. It is named for Kakwa, the Cree word for porcupine.

The tallest mountains are Mount Sir Alexander (3270 m) and Mount Ida (3189 m).

== Recreation ==
Fishing in Kakwa Lake is permitted. Snowmobiling is permitted on trails, meadows, and along mountain sides. It is advised that snowmobilers bring extra fuel, for Kakwa Lake is about 100 km from the staging site.

Kakwa Provincial Park is also the Northern terminus of the Great Divide Trail, running from the US border at Waterton Lakes National Park to a trailhead on the Walker Creek Forest Service Road.

== See also ==
- List of British Columbia Provincial Parks
