= Valleyview, Alberta =

Valleyview
- Town
- Town of Valleyview
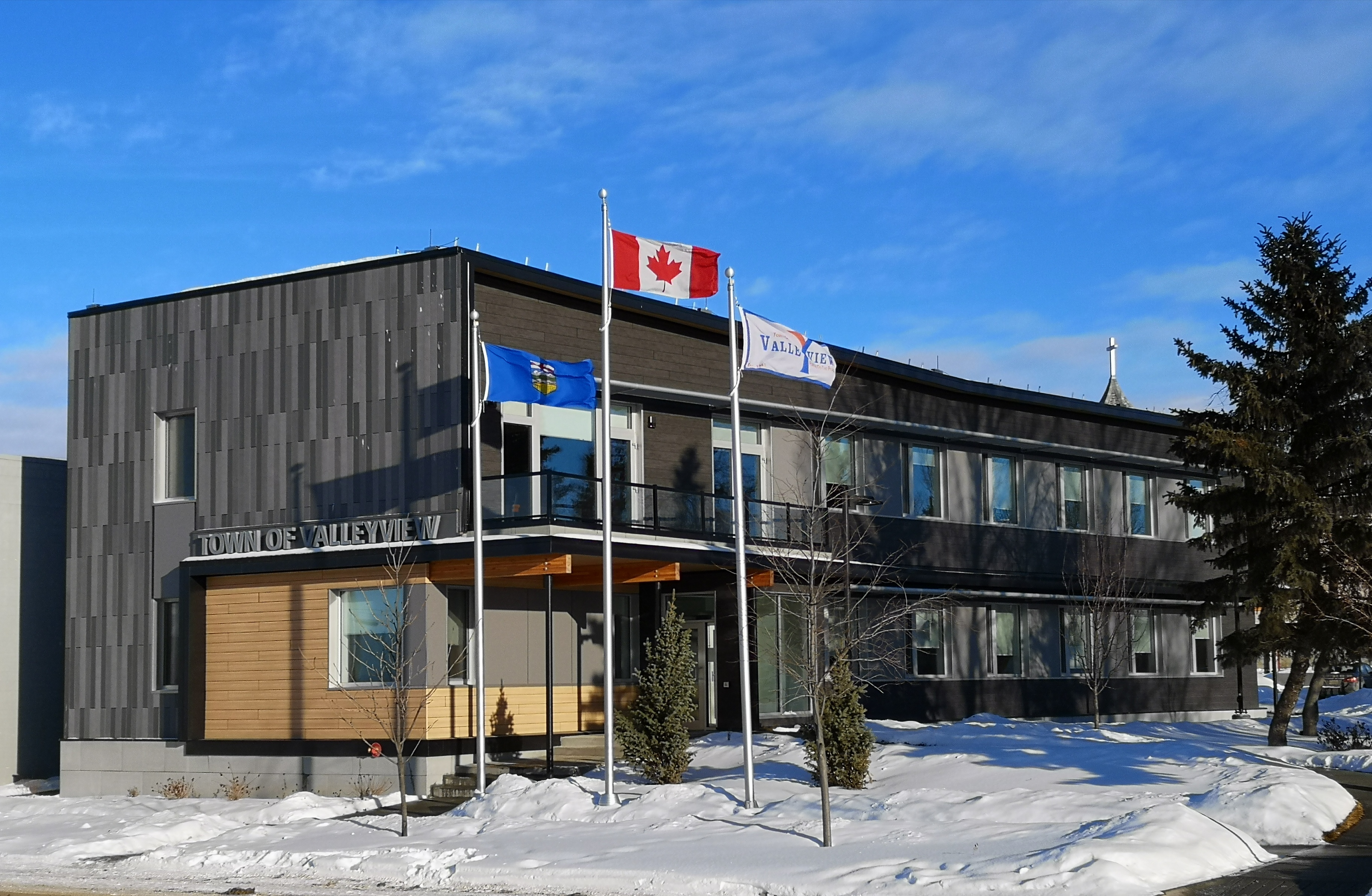
- Town Hall

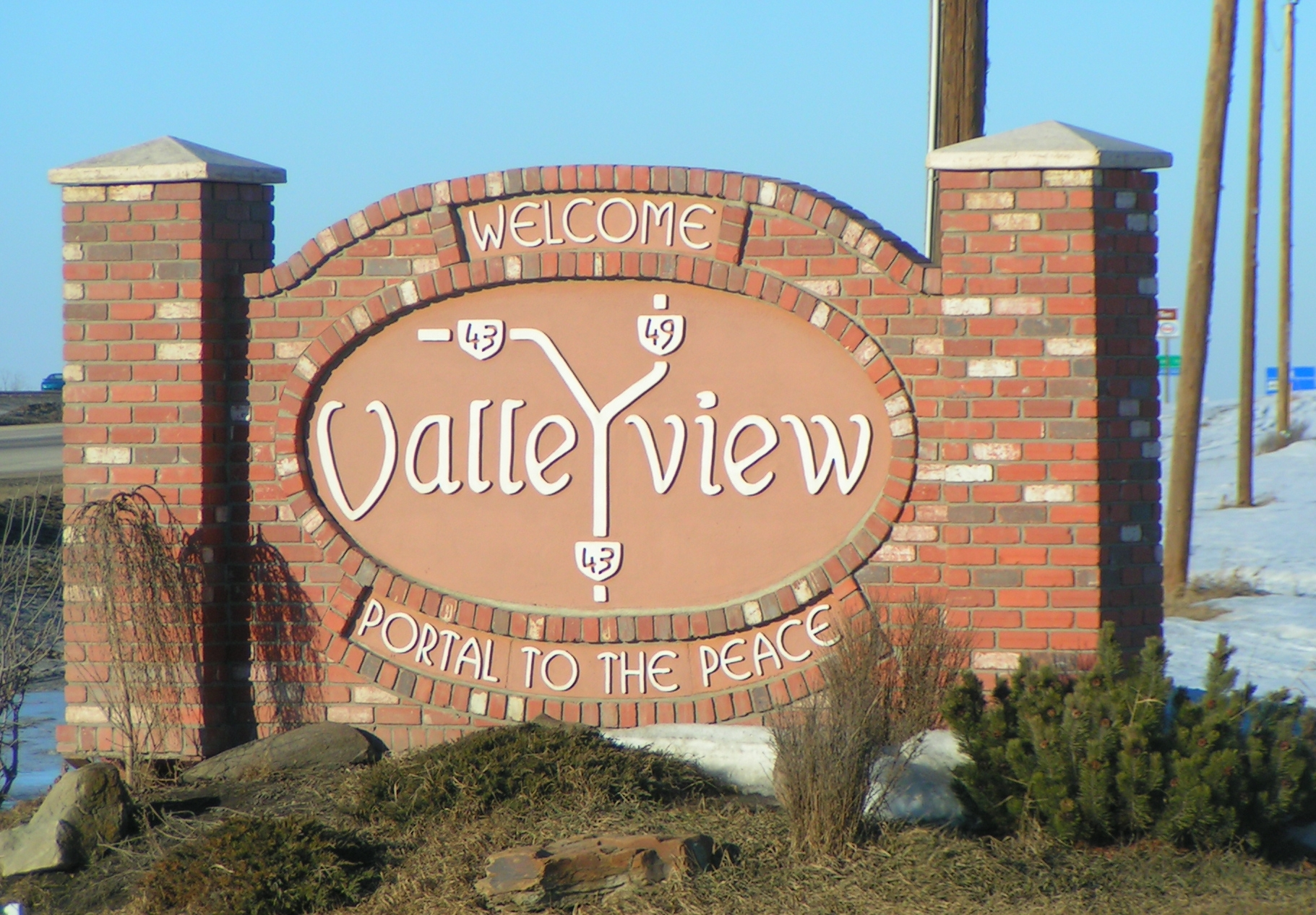
- Coat of arms Welcome sign
- Motto: Portal to the Peace
- Location in the MD of Greenview No. 16

- Location in Alberta Valleyview (Canada) Valleyview (North America)
- Coordinates: 55°04′07″N 117°16′06″W
- Country: Canada
- Province: Alberta
- Region: Northern Alberta
- Planning region: Upper Peace
- Municipal district: Municipal District of Greenview No. 16
- Incorporated
  - Village: 1 January 1955
  - Town: 5 February 1957

Government
  - Mayor: Glenn Burke
  - Governing body: Valleyview Town Council
  - Chief Administrative Officer: Jim Fedyk
  - MP: Arnold Viersen (Cons – Peace River—Westlock)
  - MLA: Todd Loewen (Independent – Central Peace—Notley)

Area (2021)
  - Land: 9.17 km^{2} (3.54 sq mi)
- Elevation: 700 m (2,300 ft)

Population (2021)
  - Total: 1,673
  - Density: 182.4/km^{2} (472/sq mi)
- Time zone: UTC−06:00 (Alberta Time)
- Postal code span: T0H
- Area code: +1-780
- Highways: Highway 43; Highway 49
- Waterways: Sturgeon Lake
- Website: Official website

Valleyview is a town in northwest Alberta, Canada. It is surrounded by the Municipal District of Greenview No. 16 and in Census Division No. 18.

It is at the junction of Highway 43 and Highway 49, between the Little Smoky River and Sturgeon Lake. Its position, in the junction of the two highways into the Peace Region, has led to the town motto, "Portal to the Peace".

== History ==
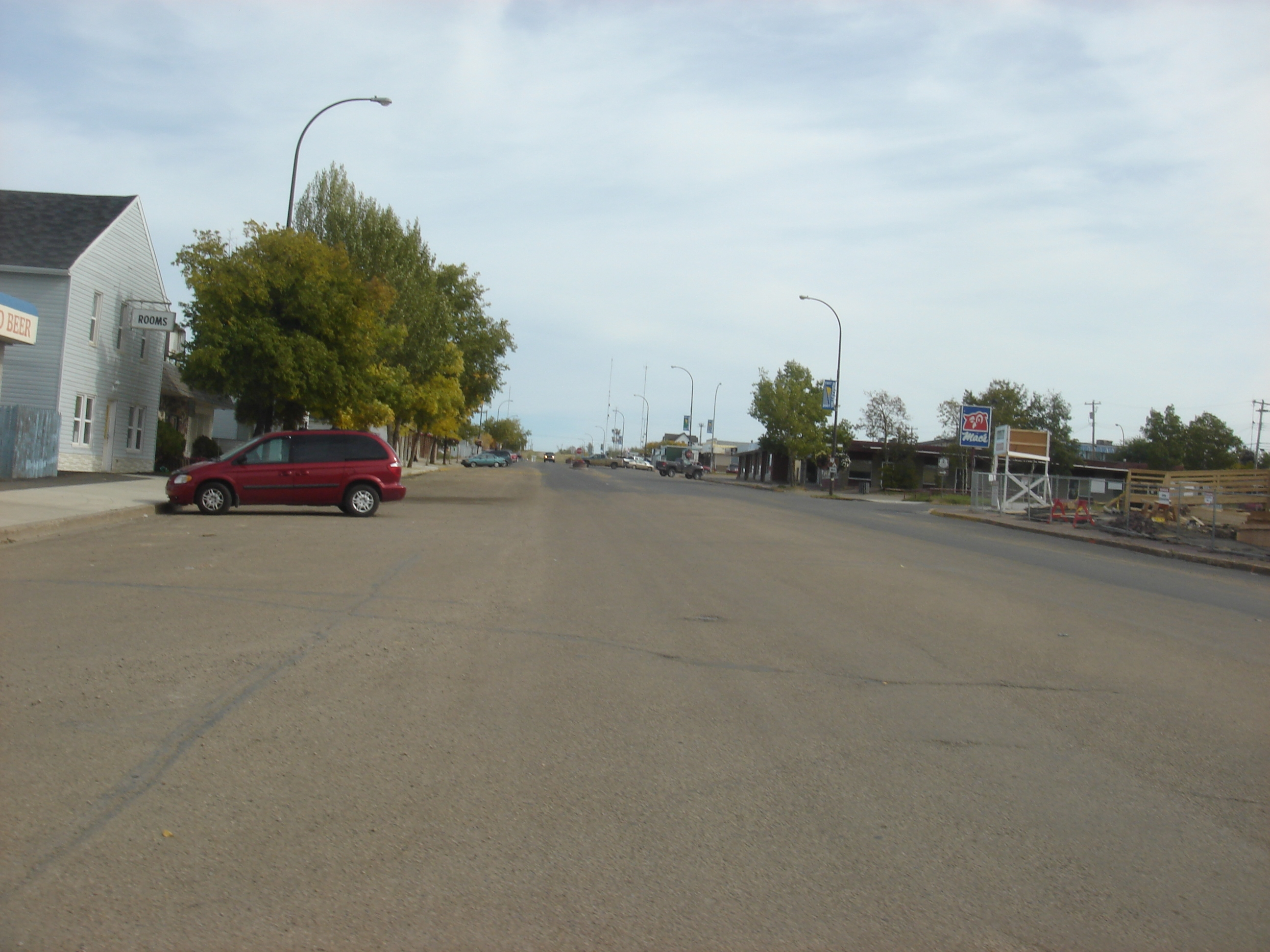
Main Street

The area around Valleyview has been inhabited by Indigenous peoples for thousands of years due to the area's rich hunting and fishing grounds. The local Cree population has lived in the region since at least the 18th century.

In the early 1800s the first visitors to the area arrived, seeking natives to exchange goods for furs. The trading was good and a Hudson's Bay Company post was established on Sturgeon Lake in 1877. Peace River Jim' Cornwall established the Bredin and Cornwall Trading Post nearby. The area was surveyed in 1900 for a possible settlement, but little developed of it. The following year the area was surveyed again by Fred Young who was particularly impressed with a piece of land on the northwest shore of Sturgeon Lake. By 1916 the first pioneers settled in the area nearby as its soil was rich for farming.

The community that formed to serve the growing population was initially named Red Willow Creek. Only when the first post office was opened in 1929 did the community change its name to Valleyview.

In late 1950 oil was discovered near the hamlet. The Whitecourt Cutoff project was completed in 1955, significantly reducing the travel time between the Peace Country and Edmonton. In 2020, the Town of Valleyview and Chamber of Commerce renamed a stretch of the highway to recognize the 65th anniversary of the cutoff's completion. By the late fifties Valleyview had firmly achieved boomtown status having been incorporated as a village in 1954 and then a town only three years later in 1957.

== Geography ==
The town is located in the southern Peace Region between the Little Smoky River and Sturgeon Lake. As noted by its name, the town is elevated and overlooks the surrounding valleys. Sturgeon Lake is located approximately 15 km west of the town and is home to Young's Point Provincial Park, a popular provincial park in the area. Residing next to the Sturgeon Lake Cree Nation reservation #154, within the land of Treaty 8.

Valleyview lies on the Western Canadian Sedimentary Basin known for some of the largest coal and oil deposits in the world and the Duvernay Formation a rich source of natural gas and oil. The town is also located in an active geothermal area.

=== Climate ===
Valleyview experiences a humid continental climate (Köppen climate classification Dfb). Summers are warm with cool nights. Winters are long and severely cold.

Climate data for Valleyview
| Month | Jan | Feb | Mar | Apr | May | Jun | Jul | Aug | Sep | Oct | Nov | Dec | Year |
|---|---|---|---|---|---|---|---|---|---|---|---|---|---|
| Record high °C (°F) | 16.0 (60.8) | 18.0 (64.4) | 21.0 (69.8) | 28.0 (82.4) | 32.0 (89.6) | 33.3 (91.9) | 34.8 (94.6) | 34.0 (93.2) | 32.0 (89.6) | 29.0 (84.2) | 18.0 (64.4) | 14.5 (58.1) | 34.8 (94.6) |
| Mean daily maximum °C (°F) | −6.3 (20.7) | −2.6 (27.3) | 2.9 (37.2) | 10.6 (51.1) | 16.7 (62.1) | 20.6 (69.1) | 22.6 (72.7) | 21.6 (70.9) | 16.3 (61.3) | 9.4 (48.9) | 0.2 (32.4) | −4.7 (23.5) | 8.9 (48.0) |
| Daily mean °C (°F) | −11.5 (11.3) | −8.3 (17.1) | −3 (27) | 4.5 (40.1) | 10.1 (50.2) | 14.2 (57.6) | 16.3 (61.3) | 15.2 (59.4) | 10.3 (50.5) | 4.3 (39.7) | −4.4 (24.1) | −9.5 (14.9) | 3.2 (37.8) |
| Mean daily minimum °C (°F) | −16.7 (1.9) | −14 (7) | −8.8 (16.2) | −1.6 (29.1) | 3.5 (38.3) | 7.9 (46.2) | 9.9 (49.8) | 8.8 (47.8) | 4.2 (39.6) | −0.8 (30.6) | −8.9 (16.0) | −14.3 (6.3) | −2.6 (27.3) |
| Record low °C (°F) | −43 (−45) | −40 (−40) | −42 (−44) | −27 (−17) | −15 (5) | −4 (25) | 0.0 (32.0) | −1 (30) | −11.1 (12.0) | −29 (−20) | −32.2 (−26.0) | −46.1 (−51.0) | −46.1 (−51.0) |
| Average precipitation mm (inches) | 33.8 (1.33) | 18.3 (0.72) | 19.2 (0.76) | 24.4 (0.96) | 48.8 (1.92) | 79.4 (3.13) | 92.4 (3.64) | 62.9 (2.48) | 48.2 (1.90) | 24.7 (0.97) | 28.2 (1.11) | 27.0 (1.06) | 504.8 (19.87) |
Source: Environment Canada

== Demographics ==
Federal census population history
| Year | Pop. | ±% |
|---|---|---|
| 1956 | 973 | — |
| 1961 | 1,077 | +10.7% |
| 1966 | 1,827 | +69.6% |
| 1971 | 1,732 | −5.2% |
| 1976 | 1,716 | −0.9% |
| 1981 | 2,061 | +20.1% |
| 1986 | 1,987 | −3.6% |
| 1991 | 1,980 | −0.4% |
| 1996 | 1,906 | −3.7% |
| 2001 | 1,856 | −2.6% |
| 2006 | 1,725 | −7.1% |
| 2011 | 1,761 | +2.1% |
| 2016 | 1,863 | +5.8% |
Source: Statistics Canada

In the 2021 Census of Population conducted by Statistics Canada, the Town of Valleyview had a population of 1,673 living in 661 of its 782 total private dwellings, a change of −10.2% from its 2016 population of 1,863. With a land area of 9.17 km^{2} (3.54 sq mi), it had a population density of 182.4/km^{2} (472.5/sq mi) in 2021.

In the 2016 Census of Population conducted by Statistics Canada, the Town of Valleyview recorded a population of 1,863 living in 747 of its 833 total private dwellings, a 5.8% change from its 2011 population of 1,761. With a land area of 9.32 km^{2} (3.60 sq mi), it had a population density of 199.9/km^{2} (517.7/sq mi) in 2016.

The Town of Valleyview's 2013 municipal census counted a population of 1,972, a 4.7% change from its 2007 municipal census population of 1,884.

== Government ==
=== Municipal politics ===
Valleyview Town Council consists of a mayor and six councillors. The current mayor, Glenn Burke, has served the town previously as a councillor. The town's Chief Administrative Officer is Jim Fedyk.

=== Provincial politics ===
Valleyview federal election results
| Year | Liberal | | Conservative | | New Democratic | | Green | |
|---|---|---|---|---|---|---|---|---|
| 2021 | 6% | 51 | 59% | 518 | 12% | 108 | 1% | 5 |
| 2019 | 6% | 55 | 79% | 727 | 10% | 88 | 2% | 20 |

Valleyview provincial election results
| Year | United Cons. | | New Democratic | |
|---|---|---|---|---|
| 2019 | 76% | 498 | 18% | 121 |

Valleyview is part of the Central Peace-Notley provincial electoral district. The riding was first contested in 2019; previously, Valleyview was in the Grande Prairie-Smoky riding. Central Peace-Notley is represented by MLA Todd Loewen, who was elected as a member of the United Conservative Party in 2019. Loewen briefly sat as an independent MLA, but was welcomed back into the UCP by Premier Danielle Smith. He now sits as the Minister of Forestry and Parks for the provincial Alberta government.

=== Federal politics ===
Valleyview is part of the Peace River federal electoral district, and is represented by MP Chris Warkentin. In the next federal election, Valleyview will become part of the newly created riding of Peace River—Westlock.

== Economy ==
Valleyview's economy is primarily resource driven with oil and gas being the predominant industry. Multiple oil and gas companies operate in the area with several pipelines in the vicinity. Tervita began in Valleyview as Concord Well Servicing in 1979, founded by David Werklund and Gordon Vivian, and still has operations in the area. Pembina Pipeline has an office in Valleyview and operates a terminal facility south of town along with managing other assets in the area. The industry also supports a variety of well service companies and related businesses.

The travel industry is also a major component in Valleyview. Situated along the CANAMEX Corridor and at the junction of two major highways, a service corridor has developed to cater to the needs of travelers. Hotels/motels, gas/service stations and fast food establishments have been built adjacent to the portions of Highway 43 and Highway 49 that pass through town. This section is called Crocus Hill Gasoline Alley.

Another notable employer in Valleyview is the Municipal District of Greenview, which has its main administrative office and several departments situated within town limits. The town is also a regional hub for medical services.

== Attractions ==
Valleyview hosts the Crocus Hill Stampede, an annual rodeo and agricultural show at the Valleyview and District Agricultural Society grounds. Each summer a fair is held on the town's Main St. (50th Ave).

=== Sports and recreation ===
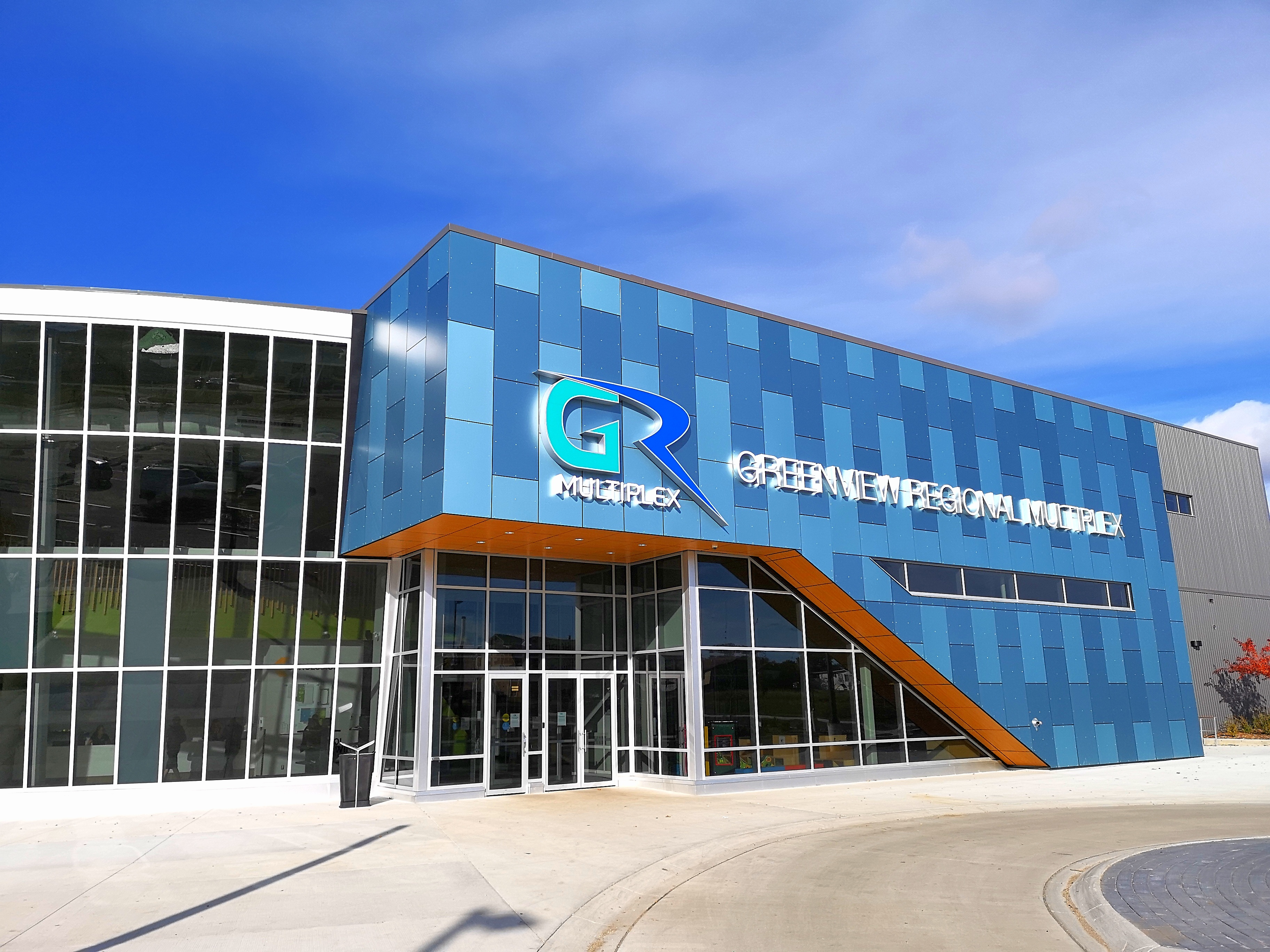
Greenview Regional Multiplex

Valleyview is the home of Greenview's regional multiplex titled the Greenview Regional Multiplex. The recreational centre opened 9 February 2018, boasting aquatics, a fieldhouse, a play area, a commercial kitchen, and a fitness centre located on the second floor.

Valleyview's main recreational activity is found at the ice rink, named Polar Palace. This is where the Valleyview's hockey team (the Valleyview Jets) plays regular games in the Peace Region league. Also located in the ice rink is a curling rink which has regular bonspiels. Next door to the Polar Palace is the Legion picnic area and water park.

The nearby Sturgeon Lake provides setting for outdoor activities. Two provincial parks are found on its shores: Young's Point Provincial Park (beach, boating, fishing, camping) and Williamson Provincial Park (beach, boating, fishing).

== Infrastructure ==
=== Transportation ===
Valleyview is situated on the junction of Highway 43 leading to British Columbia and Alaska via Grande Prairie and the north south stretch of Highway 49 towards Donnelly and Alberta Highway 2 towards Peace River.

The town is served by Valleyview Airport (TC LID: CEL5), located south of the community. The Valleyview airport primarily provides air ambulance flights and serves as a hub for recreational pilots and charter flights in the area. As of 2022 a capital upgrade initiative is underway to improve infrastructure at the Valleyview Airport. There are no regularly scheduled flights.

=== Healthcare ===
The Valleyview Health Centre, administered by Alberta Health Services, provides emergency care and other services to the town and immediate area. Alberta Health Services provides immunizations, early-childhood classes, and additional services through Valleyview Community Health Services located in the Provincial Building on 50th Ave. The Valleyview Medical and Dental Clinic provides doctor's offices and dental services.

== Education ==
Valleyview has three public schools, operated by Northern Gateway Public Schools, which combined serve students from Kindergarten to Grade 12. Valleyview also has St. Stephen's, a Catholic school serving students from Kindergarten to Grade Nine operated by the Holy Family Catholic Regional Division.

Northern Lakes College provides post-secondary education at their Valleyview Campus.

== Libraries ==
According to national media, a library in Valleyview has been under attack in recent years. The town council voted to close the library and relocate it to a school that will be built sometime in the future.

In early February 2025, the critically-acclaimed, and award-winning, Canadian investigative television program, The Fifth Estate, broadcast a report about the Valleyview Public Library. The closing of the library was inspired by far-right local, who believe that the decision will stop the spread of “gender ideology” in Valleyview.

According to the Canadian Anti-hate Network (an NGO that tracks hatred) the reality is, "...the small library offers support and a place for the town’s Gay Straight Alliance (GSA) to play board games and eat pizza, and carries books that reflect the lived experiences of those same kids."

== Notable people ==
- David Werklund, entrepreneur and Alberta Order of Excellence recipient
- Rona Ambrose, politician
- Todd Loewen, politician
- Wyatt McIntyre, politician
- Colin Krieger, leader of the Maverick Party

== See also ==
- List of communities in Alberta
- List of francophone communities in Alberta
- List of towns in Alberta
