= Municipal District of Greenview No. 16 =

Municipal district in Alberta, Canada

- Municipal district
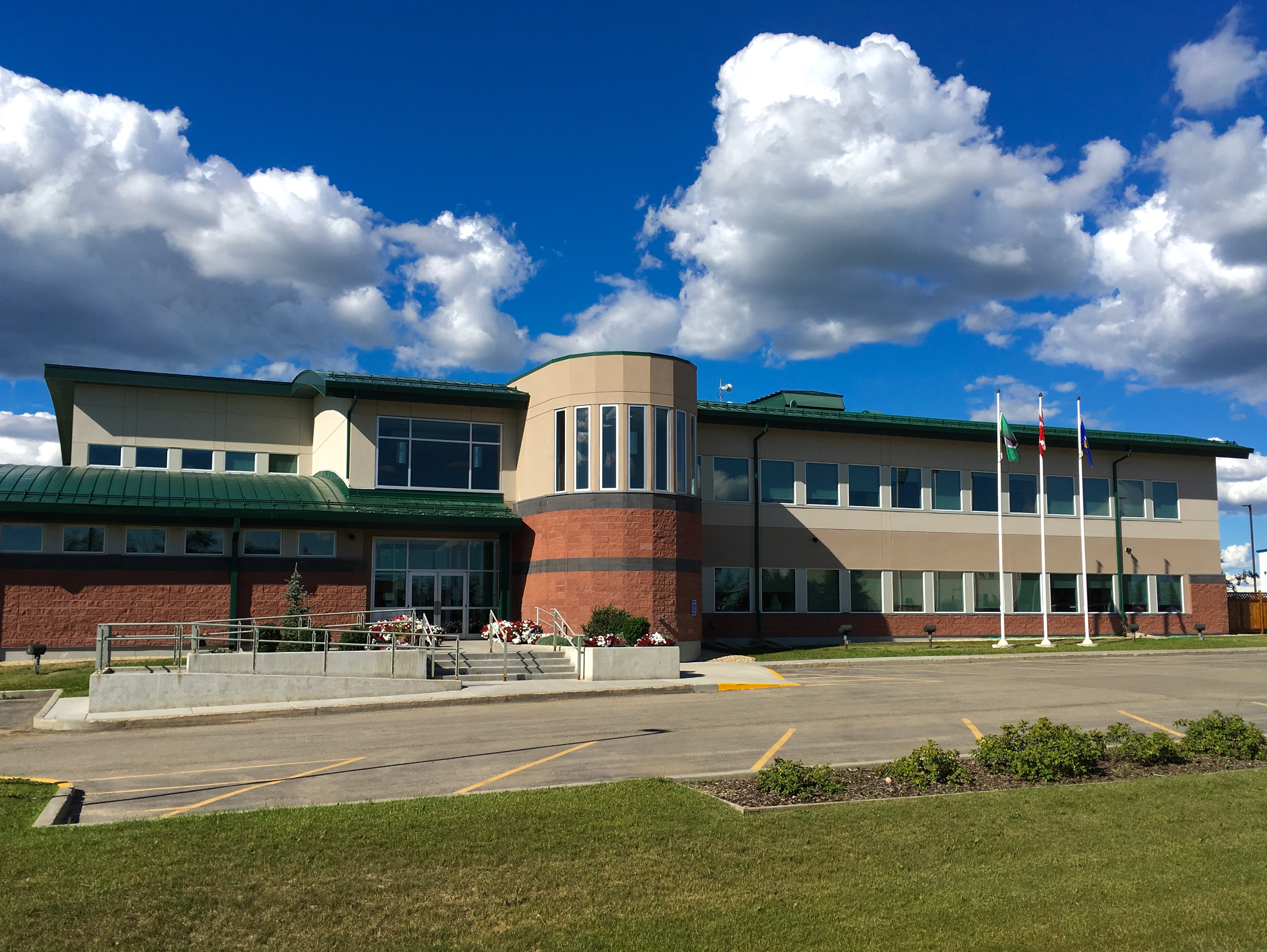
- Municipal District of Greenview's administration building in Valleyview

- Logo

- Location within Alberta
- Coordinates: 55°04′7″N 117°16′6″W
- Country: Canada
- Province: Alberta
- Region: Northern Alberta
- Census division: 18
- Established: 1994

Government
  - Reeve: Ryan Ratzlaff
  - Governing body: MD of Greenview Council
  - Administrative office: Valleyview

Area (2021)
  - Land: 32,925.53 km^{2} (12,712.62 sq mi)

Population (2021)
  - Total: 8,584
  - Density: 0.3/km^{2} (0.78/sq mi)
- Time zone: UTC−06:00 (Alberta Time)
- Website: mdgreenview.ab.ca

The Municipal District of Greenview No. 16 is a municipal district (MD) in northwest Alberta, Canada. It covers the full extent of Census Division 18, and with an area of 32,984 km^{2} (12,735 mi^{2}), it is the largest municipal district in Alberta. Its administrative office is located in the Town of Valleyview.

== History ==
Human settlement of the area now forming Greenview occurred millennia ago with archaeological evidence of native peoples in the Grande Cache area dating back over 10,000 years.

Modern settlement occurred predominantly in the early twentieth century throughout the municipal district. Settlers and homesteaders followed various trails to found homesteads and early communities including DeBolt, Ridgevalley, and Grovedale. During the initial influx, the Edson to Grande Prairie Trail was a common route for many settlers reaching the north and east sections of Greenview.

In 1968 three improvement districts, formerly 110,111 and 126, were conglomerated to establish Improvement District 16. As an Improvement District it was initially administered under Alberta's Department of Municipal Affairs. In 1996 Improvement District 16 became the MD of Greenview No. 16 and was fully self-governed.

In January 2019, the former Town of Grande Cache was dissolved, becoming a hamlet under the jurisdiction of Greenview.

== Geography ==
Greenview covers a landmass with an area of 32,984.24 square kilometres and contains several geographic formations. Its westernmost portion runs along the Alberta – British Columbia border and is part of the Canadian Rockies. Its northern portion is located in Peace Country while most of the south and interior is boreal forest. The Wapiti River makes up a portion of the boundary between the County of Grande Prairie No. 1 and Greenview which also includes the Simmonette, Smoky and Little Smoky River valleys. Numerous lakes are located in Greenview. Some of the most notable are Sturgeon, Musreau, and Swan Lake as well as a portion of Snipe Lake in its northeasternmost corner.

The MD encompasses two other municipalities: the towns of Valleyview and Fox Creek as well as three reserves administered by the Sturgeon Lake Cree Nation. Greenview, in turn, is immediately neighboured by six municipalities, Wilmore Wilderness Park in the southwest and British Columbia. Grande Cache was formerly a third town within the MD until its dissolution. The town became a hamlet within Greenview on January 1, 2019.

Lying on part of the Western Canadian Sedimentary Basin which includes some of the largest coal and oil deposits in the world, Greenview is well known for its oil and gas-rich geology. The Hamlet of DeBolt gives its name to the Debolt Formation. Geothermal reservoirs are also abundant in certain parts of the municipal district.

=== Communities and localities ===
The following urban municipalities are surrounded by the MD of Greenview No. 16.

Cities

- none

Towns

- Fox Creek
- Valleyview

Villages

- none

Summer villages

- none

The following hamlets are located within the MD of Greenview No. 16.

Hamlets

- DeBolt
- Grande Cache
- Grovedale
- Landry Heights
- Little Smoky
- Ridgevalley

The following localities are located within the MD of Greenview No. 16.

Localities

- Amundson
- Aspen Grove
- Botten
- Braaten
- Calais
- Clarkson Valley
- Cosy Cove
- Crooked Creek
- Denard
- Dorscheid
- East Grove
- Goodwin
- Kamisak (Grande Cache Lake) Enterprise
- Grey
- Grizzly
- Hilltop
- Kaybob
- Joachim Enterprise
- Latornell
- Little Smoky River
- Muskeg River
- The Narrows
- New Fish Creek
- Owen
- Pass Creek
- Sturgeon Heights
- Sturgeon Lake Settlement
- Sunset House
- Susa Creek Cooperative
- Sweathouse Creek
- Thordarson
- Tolstad
- Two Creeks
- Victor Lake Cooperative
- Wapiti
- Winniandy

Other places

- Wanyandie Flats

== Demographics ==
In the 2021 Census of Population conducted by Statistics Canada, the MD of Greenview No. 16 had a population of 8,584 living in 3,230 of its 3,955 total private dwellings, a change of −6.2% from its 2016 population of 9,154. With a land area of 32,925.53 km^{2} (12,712.62 sq mi), it had a population density of 0.3/km^{2} (0.7/sq mi) in 2021.

In the 2016 Census of Population conducted by Statistics Canada, the MD of Greenview No. 16 had a population of 5,583 living in 2,067 of its 2,473 total private dwellings, a 5.4% change from its 2011 population of 5,299. With a land area of 32,984.24 km^{2} (12,735.29 sq mi), it had a population density of 0.2/km^{2} (0.4/sq mi) in 2016.

The MD of Greenview No. 16's 2013 municipal census counted a population of 5,242, a −5% change from its 2000 municipal census population of 5,516.

== Economy ==
Oil and gas is the main economic driver in the MD, along with forestry and agriculture.

== Attractions ==
- DeBolt and District Pioneer Museum
- Kakwa Wildlands Park
- Musreau Lake
- O'Brien Provincial Park
- Pierre Grey's Lakes Provincial Park
- Sturgeon Lake
- Willmore Wilderness Park

== Government ==
=== Municipal politics ===
The MD of Greenview No. 16 is governed in accordance with Alberta's Municipal Government Act. Residents elect 11 ward councillors every four years.

=== Provincial politics ===
Greenview is served by the provincial electoral divisions of Grande Prairie – Smoky, Grande Prairie – Wapiti and, West Yellowhead. As of 2026, all ridings are currently held by the United Conservative Party.

=== Federal politics ===
Greenview is served by the federal electoral divisions of Grande Prairie Mackenzie, Peace River- Westlock and Yellowhead. All three are currently represented by members of the Conservative Party.

== Infrastructure ==
As part of the CANAMEX Corridor, the presence of Highway 43 within the MD makes Greenview an important industry travel route. The Bighorn Highway (Highway 40) as well as Highway 49 also play a large role in making the area a major transportation route for the north of the province. Several small airports and heliports are in the area including the Valleyview Airport, Fox Creek Airport and DeBolt Aerodrome. They predominantly serve industry and medical facilities in the area with light aircraft.

== See also ==
- List of communities in Alberta
- List of municipal districts in Alberta
