= Thunder Lake =

Thunder Lake can refer to:

- Thunder Lake (Alberta), a lake in Alberta, Canada
- Thunder Lake, Alberta, a hamlet in Alberta, Canada
- Thunder Lake Provincial Park in Alberta, Canada
- Thunder Lake (Minnesota), a lake in Cass County
- Thunder Lake Township, Cass County, Minnesota
- Thunder Lake (British Columbia), a lake in E. C. Manning Provincial Park.

== See also ==
- Thunder Bay (disambiguation)
