= Alberta Highway 33 =

Highway in Alberta, Canada

Highway 33
- Grizzly Trail
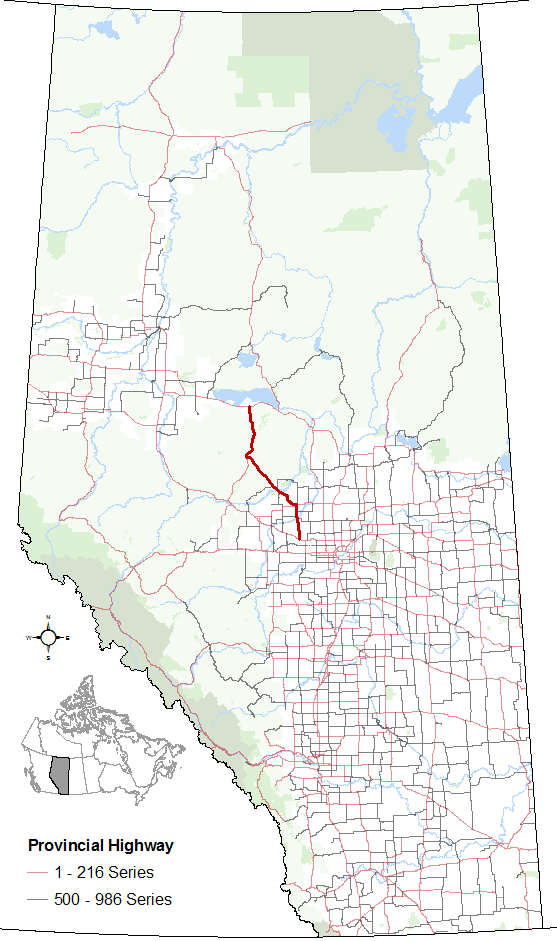

Route information
- Maintained by the Ministry of Transportation and Economic Corridors
- Length: 218.6 km (135.8 mi)

Major junctions
- South end: Highway 43 near Gunn
- Highway 18 in Barrhead; Highway 32 in Swan Hills
- North end: Highway 2 near Kinuso

Location
- Country: Canada
- Province: Alberta
- Specialized and rural municipalities: Lac Ste. Anne County, County of Barrhead No. 11, Woodlands County, Big Lakes County
- Towns: Barrhead, Swan Hills

Highway system
- Alberta Numbered Highway Network; List; Former
← Highway 32	→ Highway 35

Highway 33, officially named Grizzly Trail, is a north–south highway in west–central Alberta, Canada.

Highway 33 begins at Highway 43 near the hamlet of Gunn and travels north to the town of Barrhead. North of Barrhead, Highway 33 turns northwest, crossing the Athabasca River at Fort Assiniboine, before reaching the town of Swan Hills. Highway 33 continues north from Swan Hills to Highway 2 east of Kinuso. Highway 33 is about 219 kilometres (136 mi) in length.

== History ==
Highway 33 follows the original Klondike Trail, which was advertised by Edmonton merchants as the shortest route to the Yukon during the Klondike Gold Rush, from the Athabasca River at Pruden's Crossing, near Fort Assiniboine, through present-day Swan Hills and along the Swan River to north to present-day Kinuso. The trail followed a very difficult and dangerous route and by 1901-02 use of the trail declined, soon after it was abandoned altogether in favour of other routes to the Peace River area.

Highway 33 originally started as short highway that connected Highway 43, 7 km (4 mi) south of Onoway, to Alberta Beach. In the 1970s, Highway 33 was extended north to Barrhead from Gunn, resulting in an 8 km (5 mi) gap between Alberta Beach and Gunn. Highway 18, which ran between Barrhead and Swan Hills, was renumbered to Highway 33 and the highway was extended north to Kinuso. In c. 1985, the original section to Alberta Beach became part of Highway 633. Highway 33 in Alberta is officially known as "Grizzly Trail" as after Fort Assinaboine, it passes directly through the middle of the primary habitat of the Swan Hills grizzly bear.

== Points of interest ==
Approximately 1/2 way along Highway 33, following it 111 km from either end will place you at or near the geographical center of Alberta.

== Major intersections ==
From south to north:

Rural/specialized municipality	Location	km	mi	Destinations	Notes
Lac Ste. Anne County		−18.7	−11.6	Highway 43 – Grande Prairie, Edmonton	South of Onoway; former eastern terminus
Lac Ste. Anne County		−10.6	−6.6	Highway 633 west – Darwell	Former Highway 634
Lac Ste. Anne County	Alberta Beach	−8.1	−5.0		Former western terminus
Lac Ste. Anne County	8 km (5 mi) gap				
Lac Ste. Anne County		0.0	0.0	Highway 43 – Edmonton, Grande Prairie	East of Gunn; southern terminus
Lac Ste. Anne County	Rich Valley	13.5	8.4		
Lac Ste. Anne County	Birch Cove	25.8	16.0		
County of Barrhead No. 11		28.0	17.4	Highway 651 east – Legal	
County of Barrhead No. 11		30.0	18.6	Crosses the Pembina River	
County of Barrhead No. 11		31.9	19.8	Highway 654 west	South end of Highway 654 concurrency
County of Barrhead No. 11		38.3	23.8	Highway 654 east – Manola	North end of Highway 654 concurrency
Barrhead		44.8	27.8	Highway 18 west (53 Avenue) – Mayerthorpe	South end of Highway 18 concurrency
County of Barrhead No. 11		48.0	29.8	Highway 18 east – Westlock	North end of Highway 18 concurrency
County of Barrhead No. 11	Camp Creek	66.9	41.6		
County of Barrhead No. 11		79.7	49.5	Highway 763 south – Tiger Lilly	
↑ / ↓		82.3	51.1	Crosses the Athabasca River	
Woodlands County	Fort Assiniboine	83.9	52.1	Highway 661 east – Dapp	
Woodlands County		91.1	56.6	Highway 658 west – Goose Lake, Blue Ridge	
Big Lakes County	Swan Hills	145.2	90.2	Highway 32 south – Whitecourt	
Big Lakes County		218.6	135.8	Highway 2 – Peace River, Slave Lake, Edmonton	East of Kinuso; northern terminus
1.000 mi = 1.609 km; 1.000 km = 0.621 mi: Closed/former; Concurrency terminus

== Photos ==
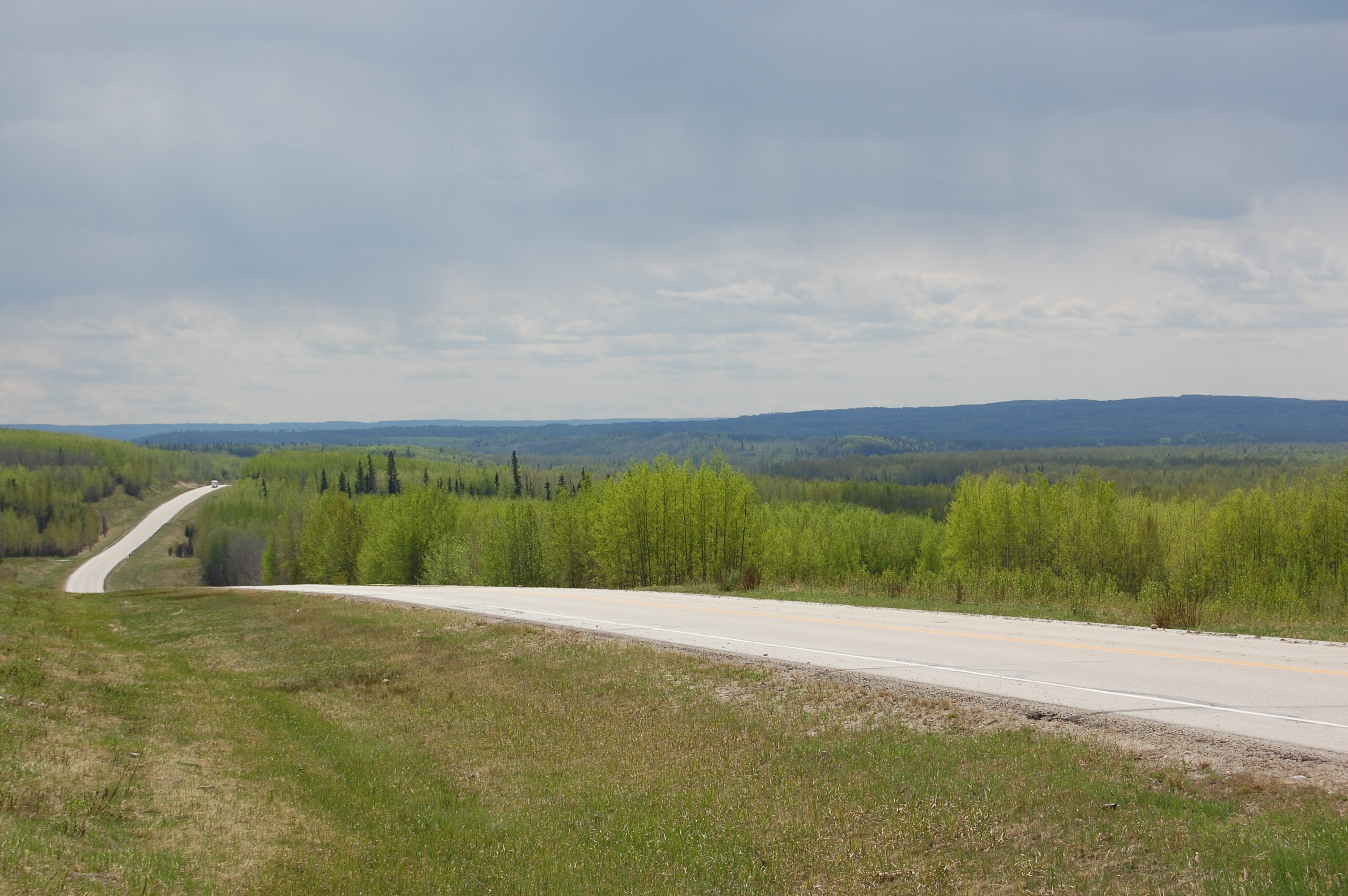
Highway 33 north of Swan Hills

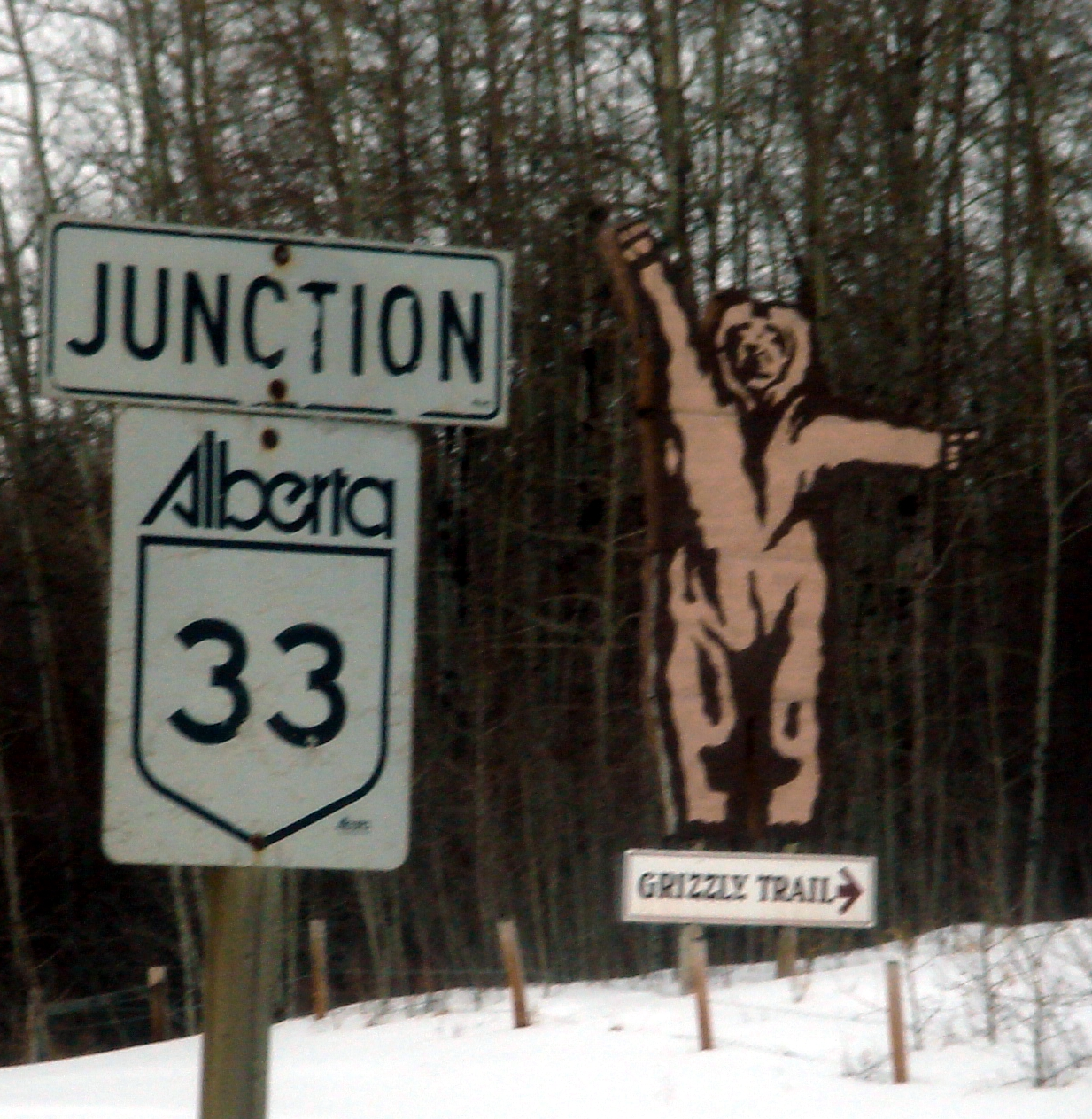
Junction sign on Highway 43
