= Freeman River =

River in Alberta, Canada

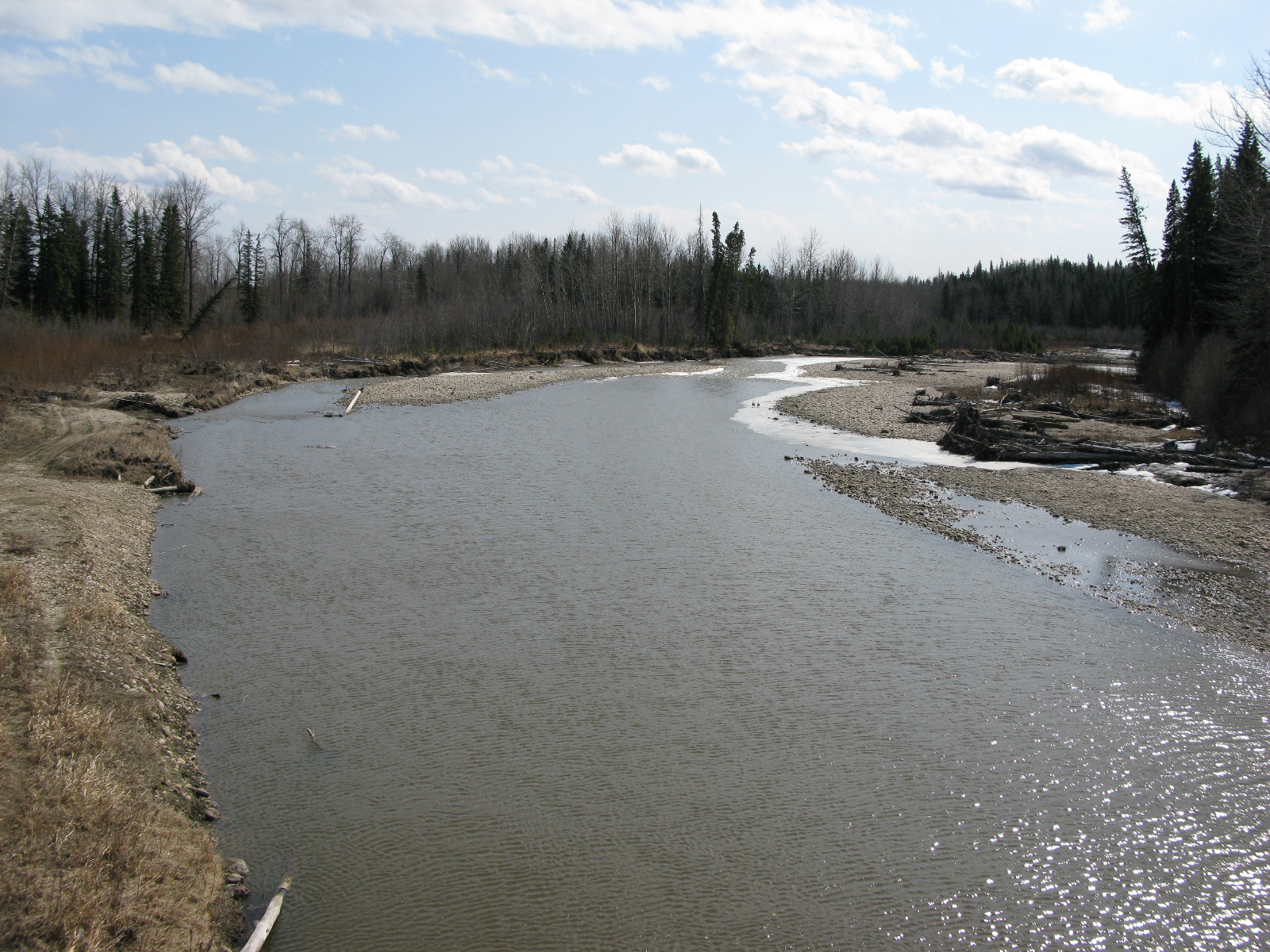
- The Freeman River near Fort Assiniboine

Location
- Country: Canada
- Province: Alberta

Physical characteristics
- Source
  - location: Freeman River Headwaters
  - coordinates: 54°39′56″N 115°57′54″W
  - elevation: 1,096 m (3,596 ft)
- Mouth
  - location: Athabasca River
  - coordinates: 54°19′14″N 114°47′16″W
  - elevation: 605 m (1,985 ft)

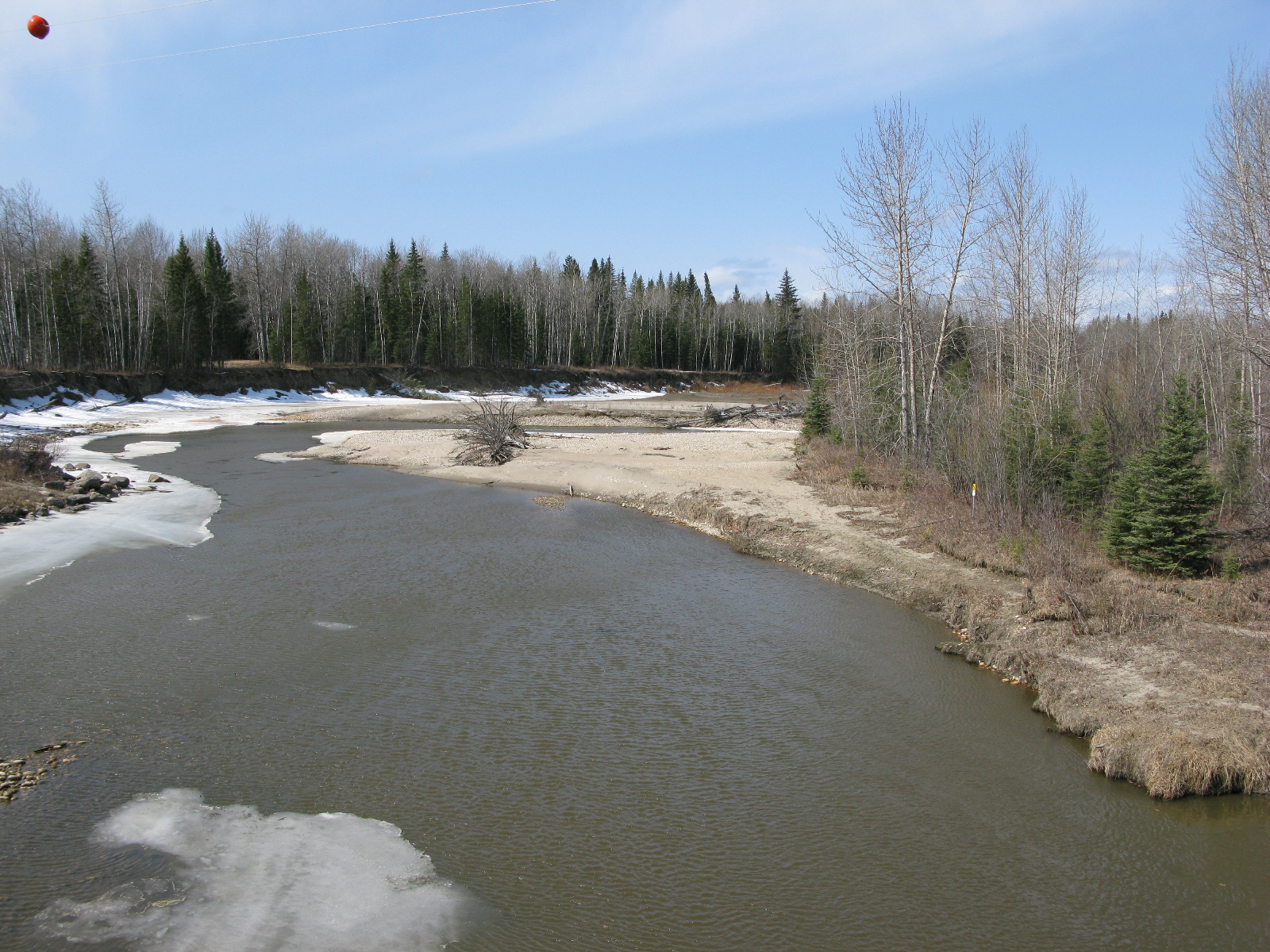
Freeman River

The Freeman River is a short river in west-central Alberta, Canada. The Freeman takes its name from the fur traders, who, after leaving the employ of the Hudson's Bay Company or the North West Company, decided to remain in the interior and work as free trappers or free hunters.

== Course ==
The river flows in a southeastern direction for much of its course. It flows through a significant petroleum and natural gas field near the town of Swan Hills, before being bridged by Alberta Highway 32. The river then runs parallel to Alberta Highway 33, takes on the Morse River, and joins the Athabasca River near Fort Assiniboine.

== Flooding ==
The Freeman River has experienced significant flooding in the past. Particularly notable is the flood of July 1971, which swept away a bridge crossing the river near Fort Assiniboine, Alberta. One first-year science student from the University of Alberta, who was working with the Provincial Ecology Corps over the summer, was killed when the bridge collapsed and fell into the river.

== Tributaries ==
- Mons Lake
- Louis Creek
- Judy Creek
- Freeman Creek
- Sarah Creek
- Morse River

== See also ==
- List of Alberta rivers
