= Alberta Highway 18 =

Highway in Alberta, Canada

Highway 18

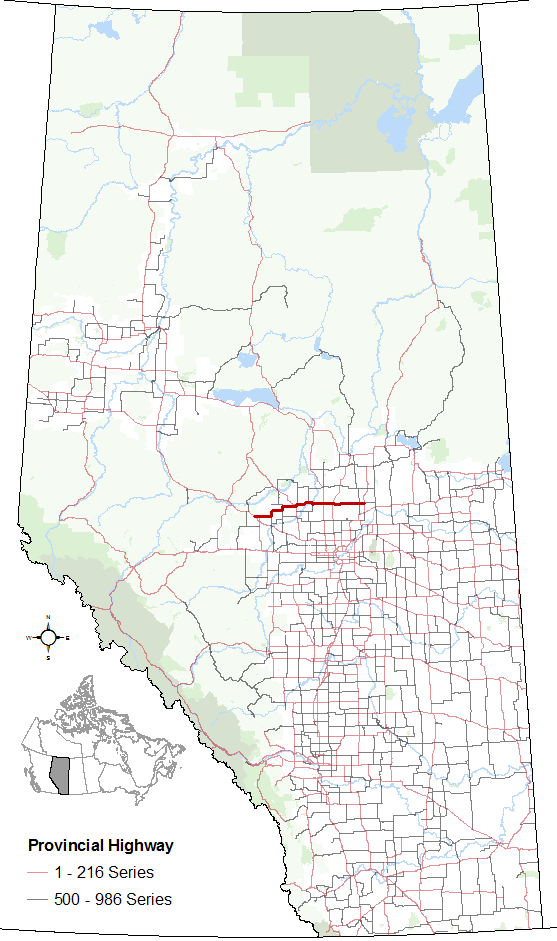

Route information
- Maintained by the Ministry of Transportation and Economic Corridors
- Length: 160.8 km (99.9 mi)

Major junctions
- West end: Highway 43 in Green Court
- Highway 22 near Mayerthorpe; Highway 33 near Barrhead; Highway 44 in Westlock; Highway 2 near Clyde
- East end: Highway 63 / Highway 656 near Thorhild

Location
- Country: Canada
- Province: Alberta
- Specialized and rural municipalities: Lac Ste. Anne County, Barrhead No. 11 County, Westlock County, Thorhild County
- Towns: Barrhead, Westlock
- Villages: Clyde

Highway system
- Alberta Numbered Highway Network; List; Former
← Highway 17	→ Highway 19

Highway 18 is a 161-kilometre (100 mi) highway in Alberta, Canada. It stretches from Highway 43 at the hamlet of Green Court, through the towns of Barrhead and Westlock, to Highway 63 east of the hamlet of Thorhild.

== Route description ==
Highway 18 begins northwest of the town of Mayerthorpe at the junction of Highway 43 at the hamlet of Green Court. It proceeds east for 8 km (5 mi), crossing the terminus of Highway 22 prior to reaching Highway 757. It turns north for a few kilometres and bends east again until it crosses Highway 764, then curves north again.

The jog in the road skirts Thunder Lake Provincial Park to the north. Upon reaching Highway 763, Highway 18 turns east to the Town of Barrhead where it meets Highway 33. The two highways run concurrently to the north for approximately 5 km (3 mi) until a T–intersection north of town. Highway 18 then turns east from this intersection while Highway 33 turns west. Highway 769 branches to the north towards Neerlandia, 2 km (1 mi) east of this intersection.

Highway 18 then crosses Highways 776 and 777 before it reaches Westlock at Highway 44, some 103 km (64 mi) from the starting point. It continues east, crossing Highway 2 at Clyde at an intersection known as "Clyde Corner". The highway goes through Thorhild as it crosses Highway 827 and proceeds west until it reaches Highways 63 and 656 where it ends.

== History ==
Highway 18 originally was a connection between Highway 2 at Clyde Corner and the towns of Westlock and Barrhead. In the 1940s it was extended northwest from Barrhead to Fort Assiniboine, and then in 1960 to Swan Hills. In c. 1977, the 97 km (60 mi) section of Highway 18 between Barrhead and Swan Hills was renumbered to Highway 33, while Secondary Highway 655 between Barrhead and Thunder Lake Provincial Park, as well as Secondary Highway 656 between Clyde and Highway 46 (present-day Highway 63) west of Thorhild became part of Highway 18. Around the same time, gravel roads between Thunder Lake and Green Court were designated as Secondary Highway 918, and was upgraded and paved throughout the 1980s, becoming part of Highway 18 in c. 1987.

== Major intersections ==
From west to east:

Rural/specialized municipality	Location	km	mi	Destinations	Notes
Lac Ste. Anne County	Green Court	0.0	0.0	Highway 43 – Whitecourt, Grande Prairie, Edmonton	Highway 18 western terminus
Lac Ste. Anne County		6.6	4.1	Highway 22 south – Mayerthorpe	
Lac Ste. Anne County		22.7	14.1	Highway 757 south – Sangudo	
Barrhead County		43.7	27.2	Highway 764 south – Cherhill	
Barrhead County	Campsie	47.7	29.6	Highway 763 north / PAR 107 west – Fort Assiniboine, Thunder Lake Provincial Park	
Barrhead		65.6	40.8	Highway 33 south (49 Street) / 53 Avenue – Edmonton	West end of Highway 33 concurrency
Barrhead County		68.9	42.8	Highway 33 north – Swan Hills	East end of Highway 33 concurrency
Barrhead County		70.5	43.8	Highway 769 north – Neerlandia, Vega	
Westlock County		85.9	53.4	Highway 776 north	
Westlock County		89.9	55.9	Crosses the Pembina River	
Westlock County		91.4	56.8	Highway 777 south – Highridge	
Westlock		106.3	66.1	Highway 44 (104 Avenue) – Slave Lake, High Prairie, Edmonton	
Westlock County		117.7	73.1	Highway 2 south – Edmonton	West end of Highway 2 concurrency
Westlock County	Clyde	119.4	74.2	Highway 2 north – Athabasca	East end of Highway 2 concurrency
Thorhild County	Thorhild	154.3	95.9	Highway 827 (2nd Street)	
Thorhild County		160.8	99.9	Highway 63 – Lac La Biche, Fort McMurray, Edmonton Highway 656 east	Highway 18 eastern terminus; continues as Highway 656
1.000 mi = 1.609 km; 1.000 km = 0.621 mi: Concurrency terminus
