= McLeod Lake (Alberta) =

Lake in Woodlands County, Alberta, Canada

- Location within Alberta
- Location: Woodlands County, Alberta
- Coordinates: 54°17′47″N 115°39′12″W
- Basin countries: Canada
- Max. length: 2.1 km (1.3 mi)
- Max. width: 2.6 km (1.6 mi)
- Surface area: 3.73 km^{2} (1.44 sq mi)
- Average depth: 5.1 m (17 ft)
- Max. depth: 10.7 m (35 ft)
- Surface elevation: 588 m (1,929 ft)
- References: McLeod Lake

McLeod Lake, formerly named Carson Lake, is a lake in central Alberta, Canada within Woodlands County. It is located north of Whitecourt, approximately 5 km (3.1 mi) east of Highway 32. Carson-Pegasus Provincial Park surrounds McLeod Lake and nearby Little McLeod Lake to the northeast.

== Camping ==
Carson-Pegasus Provincial Park at McLeod Lake includes a campground featuring 182 campsites, day use sites, and a group use site, and offers winter camping.

== Recreation ==
Other recreational activities at the provincial park and lake include bird-watching, canoeing/kayaking, cross-country skiing, fishing, hiking, horseshoes, ice fishing, power boating, snowmobiling (off-site), swimming, and wildlife viewing.

== Fish species ==
Fish species in McLeod Lake include rainbow trout.
