= Carson-Pegasus Provincial Park =

Provincial park in Alberta, Canada

- IUCN category II (national park)
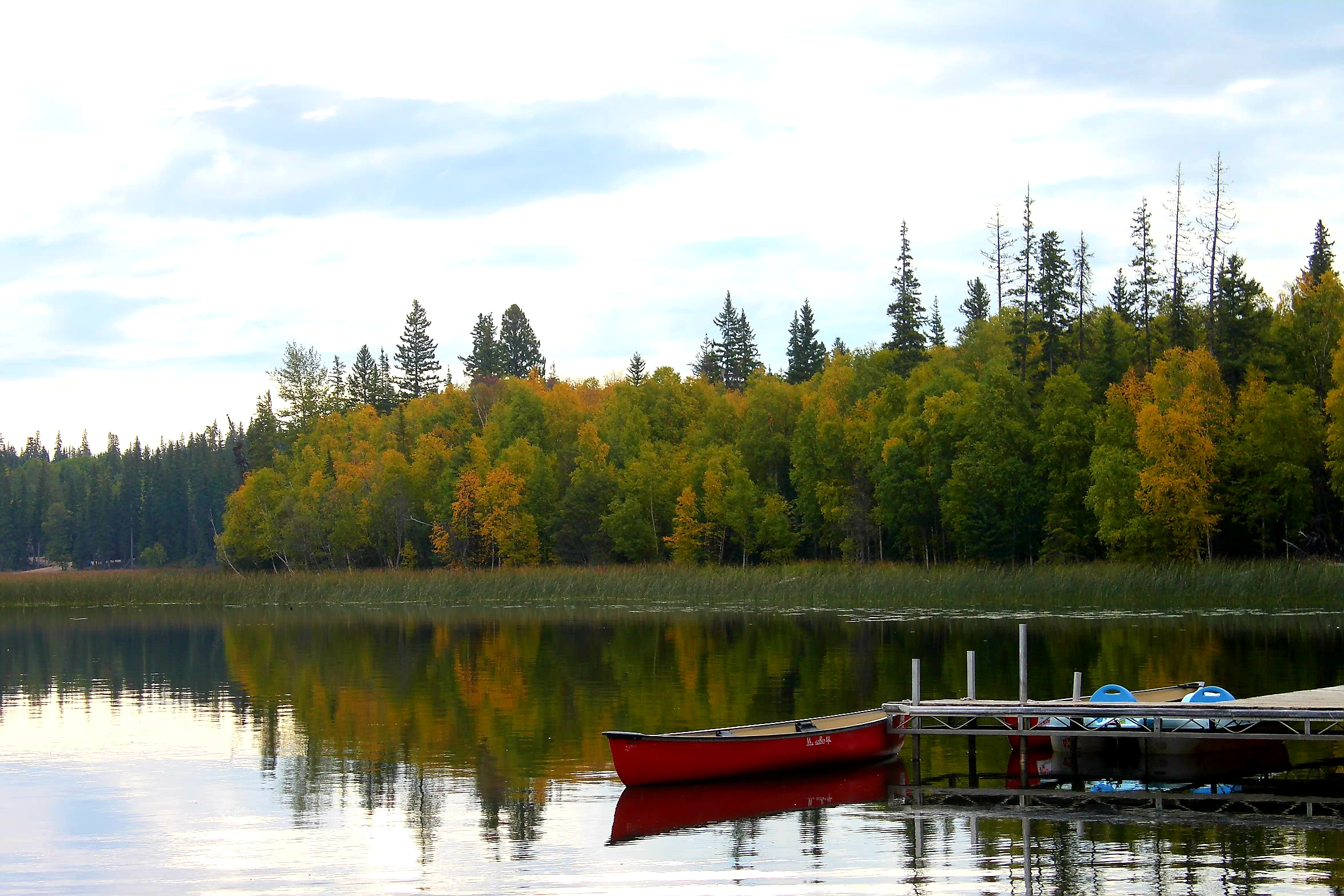

- Location within Alberta
- Interactive map of Carson-Pegasus Provincial Park
- Location: Woodlands County, Alberta, Canada
- Nearest city: Whitecourt
- Coordinates: 54°18′08″N 115°38′24″W
- Established: May 19, 1982
- Governing body: Alberta Tourism, Parks and Recreation

Carson-Pegasus Provincial Park is a provincial park located in central Alberta, Canada, within Woodlands County.

The park is located around McLeod Lake (previously named Carson Lake) and Little McLeod Lake (previously known as Pegasus Lake), approximately 23 km (14 mi) north of Whitecourt. It is accessed by Highway 32.

The park protects the boreal forest ecosystem with aspen, balsam poplar, balsam fir and white spruce, as well as the willow/alder shorelines, black spruce bogs, grass marshes, and fens. The park is also a fishing spot and a habitat for diverse mammals and birds.

== See also ==
- List of provincial parks in Alberta
- List of Canadian provincial parks
- List of National Parks of Canada
