= Neerlandia =

- Hamlet
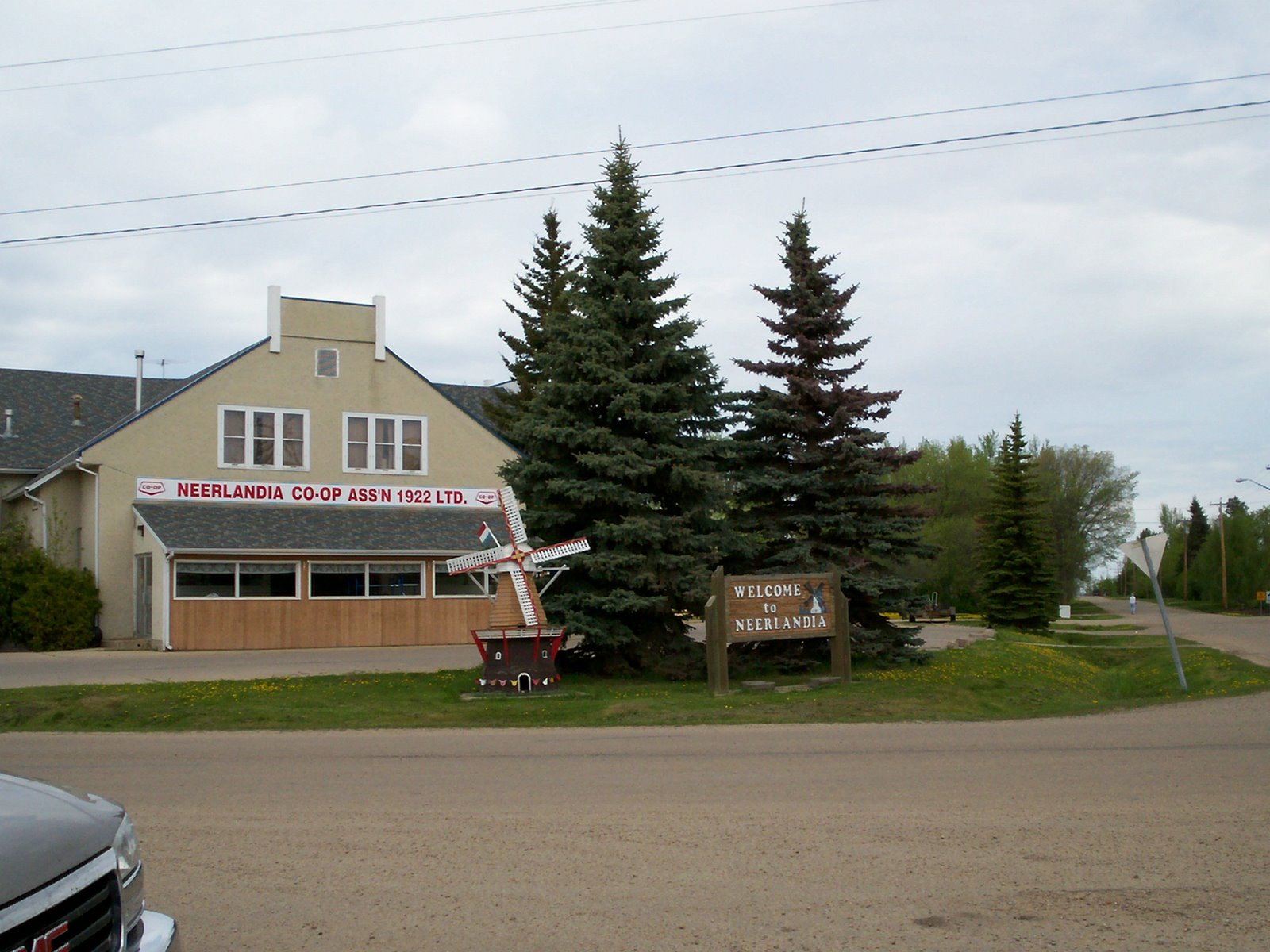
- View of downtown Neerlandia

- Location of Neerlandia Neerlandia (Canada)
- Coordinates: 54.319°N 114.377°W
- Country: Canada
- Province: Alberta
- Region: Central Alberta
- Census division: 13
- Municipal district: County of Barrhead No. 11

Government
  - Type: Unincorporated
  - Governing body: County of Barrhead No. 11 Council

Population (1991)
  - Total: 101
- Time zone: UTC−06:00 (Alberta Time)
- Area codes: 780, 587, 825

Neerlandia is a hamlet in central Alberta, Canada within the County of Barrhead No. 11. Neerlandia is situated at the intersection of Highway 769 and Township Road 615A between Mellowdale and Vega, approximately 20 kilometres north of Barrhead and northwest of Westlock.

Neerlandia was founded by Dutch immigrants beginning in 1911. The name "Neerlandia" refers to the first settlers' country of origin, the Netherlands. The surrounding area is largely agricultural based with many people in the outlying area also being involved in construction and other trades as well.

== History ==
In January 1911, Henry Kippers began a Dutch colonization society with the goal to create a Dutch farming community. The community formation began on December 18, 1911, with 16 men filling for land permits at the Dominion of Lands Office in Edmonton, Alberta. These men were John Anema, Rients de Jager, Drikus Huinink, Cornelius Ingwersen, Albert M. Mast, Johan Messelink, Henry J. Micheal, Menne Nanninga, Albert J. Oldegbers, Hendrik Schoonekamp, Berend te Ronde, Douwe Terpsma, John Terpsma, Siebren Tiemstra and Willem van Ark. This was followed by Fred Baron and Henry J. Kippers on December 26, 1911, and Arie Emmerzael on February 6, 1912.

== Demographics ==
Population history of Neerlandia
Year	Pop.	±%
1941	26	—
1951	87	+234.6%
1956	66	−24.1%
1961	71	+7.6%
1966	58	−18.3%
1971	81	+39.7%
1976	61	−24.7%
1981	67	+9.8%
1986	77	+14.9%
1991	101	+31.2%
Source: Statistics Canada

Neerlandia recorded a population of 101 in the 1991 Census of Population conducted by Statistics Canada.

== Services and amenities ==
The Hamlet of Neerlandia has four churches (Christian Reformed, United Reformed and two Canadian Reformed), a grocery store, a farm and building centre, a self-serve gas station, a restaurant, and two schools, the Neerlandia Public Christian School and the Covenant Canadian Reformed School. The public school houses the public library and has a tennis court and a baseball diamond. The ice rink beside the public school was demolished to make room for the new school and a new ice rink has been constructed across the road from the school. Neerlandia is southeast of the Fort Assiniboine Sandhills Wildland Provincial Park in Woodlands County, which is accessible via Highway 769 and Highway 661. The park and surrounding area is a camping, snowmobiling, quadding, trailriding and hunting destination.

== See also ==
- List of communities in Alberta
- List of hamlets in Alberta
