= Thunder Lake (Alberta) =

Lake in Alberta, Canada

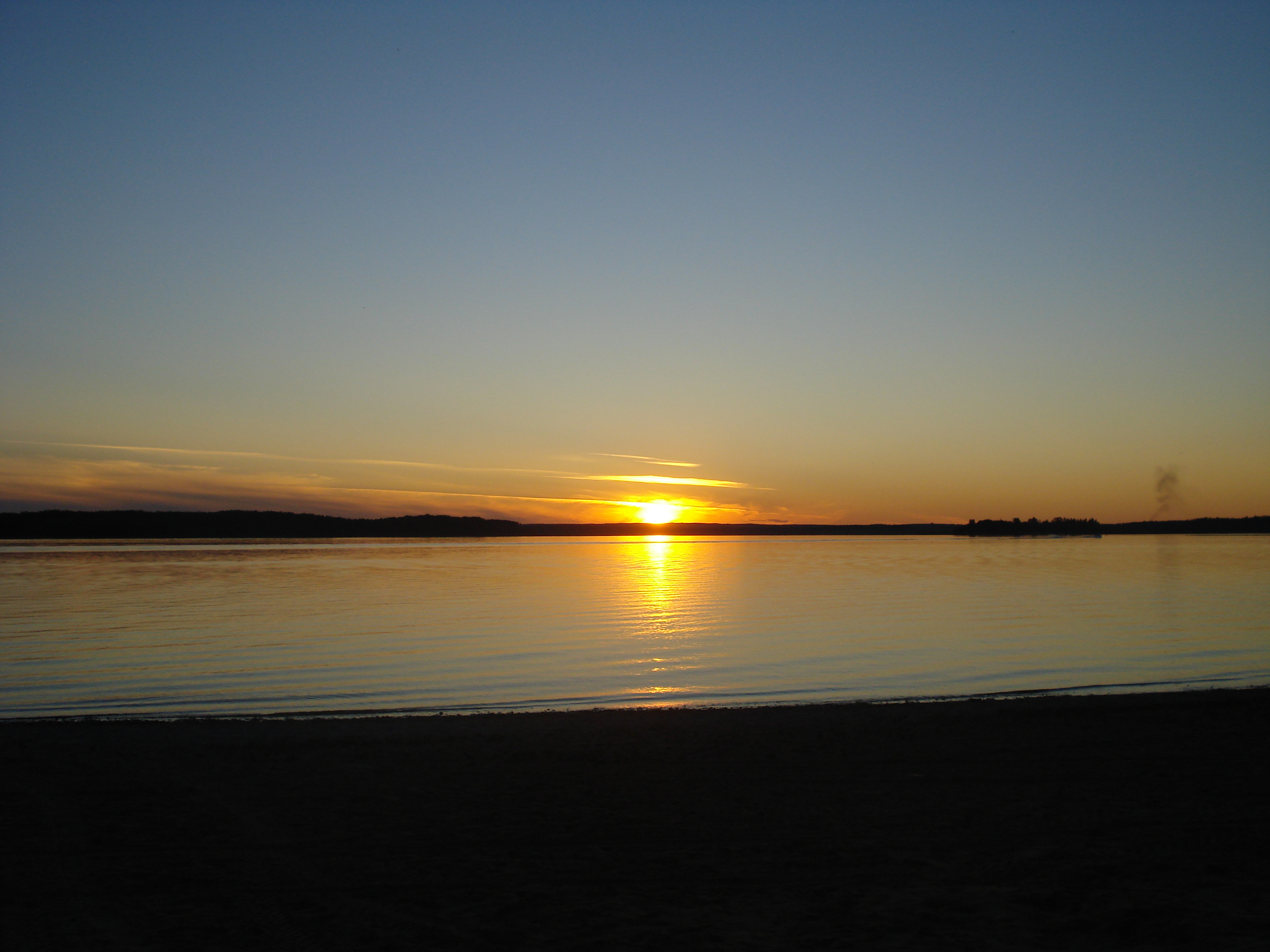
- Sunset at Thunder Lake

- Location within Alberta
- Location: County of Barrhead No. 11, Alberta
- Coordinates: 54°07′37″N 114°45′30″W
- Basin countries: Canada
- Max. length: 2.8 km (1.7 mi)
- Max. width: 5.4 km (3.4 mi)
- Surface area: 7.03 km^{2} (2.71 sq mi)
- Average depth: 3.0 m (9.8 ft)
- Max. depth: 6.1 m (20 ft)
- Surface elevation: 656 m (2,152 ft)

Thunder Lake is a lake in Alberta, Canada.

== Description ==
The lake is located in northern Alberta, 25 kilometres (16 mi) west of Barrhead, immediately south of Tiger Lily, at an elevation of 656 m (2,152 ft).

It reaches a maximum depth of 6.1 m (20 ft), and is on average 3.0 m (9.8 ft) deep.

Thunder Lake Provincial Park is established on the north-eastern shore of the lake, and the community of Thunder Lake on the southeastern shore.

== See also ==
- List of lakes in Alberta
