= Thunder Lake, Alberta =

Thunder Lake
- Hamlet
- Location of Thunder Lake Thunder Lake (Canada)
- Coordinates: 54°07′07″N 114°42′53″W
- Country: Canada
- Province: Alberta
- Region: Central Alberta
- Census division: 13
- Municipal district: County of Barrhead No. 11

Government
  - Type: Unincorporated
  - Governing body: County of Barrhead No. 11 Council

Population (1991)
  - Total: 34
- Time zone: UTC−06:00 (Alberta Time)
- Area codes: 780, 587, 825

Thunder Lake is a hamlet in central Alberta within the County of Barrhead No. 11. It is located on the eastern shore of Thunder Lake, just south of Thunder Lake Provincial Park, and is about 5 kilometres (3.1 mi) west of Highway 18 and approximately 21 kilometres (13 mi) west of Barrhead.

== Demographics ==
Thunder Lake recorded a population of 34 in the 1991 Census of Population conducted by Statistics Canada.

== See also ==
- List of communities in Alberta
- List of hamlets in Alberta
