= Bloomsbury, Alberta =

Community in Alberta, Canada

Coordinates: 54°12′38″N 114°28′30″W

Location of Bloomsbury Alberta

Bloomsbury is an unincorporated community in central Alberta in the County of Barrhead No. 11, located 6 km (3.7 mi) north of Highway 33, approximately 97 km (60 mi) northwest of Edmonton.
