= Covenant Canadian Reformed School =

Private school in Alberta, Canada

Coordinates: 54.3197155°N 114.3281377°W

- Neerlandia, Alberta; Canada

Information
- Funding type: Private school
- Religious affiliation: Christianity
- Grades: K-12
- Website: covenantschool.ca

Covenant Canadian Reformed School is a K-12 private Christian school in Neerlandia, Alberta, Canada.
