= Windfall, Alberta =

Ghost town in Woodlands County, Alberta, Canada

Coordinates: 54°11′14″N 116°13′10″W

Location of Windfall, Alberta

Windfall is a former unincorporated community and ghost town in the northwest portion of central Alberta, Canada within Woodlands County. It is located on Township Road 604 approximately 36 km (22 mi) west of Whitecourt, 12 km (7.5 mi) southwest of Highway 43, and 6 km (3.7 mi) south of the Athabasca River.

== History ==
Windfall was founded by Canadian Fina Oil Ltd. shortly after the company drilled a well and discovered gas in the Windfall field in March 1955. As a result of this discovery, and discoveries in two nearby fields by two other companies, the company developed a pilot project plant to recover gas, sulphur, and hydrocarbons from the three fields through an interlocking recovery process.

Built over two phases, the community included an apartment complex, 17 houses in excess of 1,050 ft^{2} (98 m^{2}) on basements with paved driveways and detached garages, and a school consisting of three rooms, and by 1961, Windfall had a population of 101. Infrastructure included water, wastewater, gas, and power utilities, as well as roads, sidewalks, and streetlights.

Due to the success of the pilot project plant, a larger plant was built by the Pan American Petroleum Corporation. It opened in April 1962 and was named the West Whitecourt Plant. A bridge over the Athabasca River, between Windfall and Highway 43, was built in time for the opening of the plant. As a result, the up to four-hour commute from Whitecourt was reduced to a 39 km (24 mi) commute. An extension of the Canadian National rail line from Whitecourt to Windfall was completed later that year in November 1962.

By 1966, the population of Windfall declined to 78. Shortly thereafter, those families that lived in Windfall moved to Whitecourt, approximately 36 km (22 mi) to the east, or 39 km (24 mi) away via Township Road 604 and Highway 43, rendering it a ghost town despite the adjacent West Whitecourt Plant remaining in operation.

The community's houses were later relocated to Fox Creek, approximately 44 km (27 mi) to the northwest, or 70 km (43 mi) away via Township Road 604 and Highway 43.

To this date, directional signs along Highway 43 approaching its intersection with Township Road 604 still indicate the presence of Windfall.

== See also ==
- List of communities in Alberta
- List of ghost towns in Alberta
