= Thorhild, Alberta =

Hamlet in Canada

Thorhild
- Hamlet
- Location of Thorhild
- Coordinates: 54°09′32″N 113°07′31″W
- Country: Canada
- Province: Alberta
- Region: Central Alberta
- Census division: No. 13
- Municipal district: Thorhild County
- Post office: 1914
- Incorporated (village): December 31, 1949
- Dissolved (hamlet): April 1, 2009

Government
  - Governing body: Thorhild County Council
  - Mayor: Cody Krupa

Area (2021)
  - Land: 1.69 km^{2} (0.65 sq mi)
- Elevation: 649 m (2,129 ft)

Population (2021)
  - Total: 391
  - Density: 231/km^{2} (600/sq mi)
- Time zone: UTC−06:00 (Alberta Time)
- Highways: 18; 827
- Waterways: Kennedy Creek

Thorhild is a hamlet in Alberta, Canada within Thorhild County. It is located at the intersection of Highway 18 and Highway 827, approximately 86 kilometres (53 mi) northeast of the City of Edmonton.

Thorhild was formerly a village until April 1, 2009, when it dissolved and became a hamlet within the County of Thorhild No. 7. It originally incorporated as a village on December 31, 1949. The Alberta and Great Waterways Railway paid $480 for the original townsite on July 16, 1914, and a Royal Mail Canada post office was immediately placed in the community.

== Demographics ==
In the 2021 Census of Population conducted by Statistics Canada, Thorhild had a population of 391 living in 173 of its 214 total private dwellings, a change of −26.4% from its 2016 population of 531. With a land area of 1.69 km^{2} (0.65 sq mi), it had a population density of 231.4/km^{2} (599.2/sq mi) in 2021.

As a designated place in the 2016 Census of Population conducted by Statistics Canada, Thorhild had a population of 531 living in 244 of its 270 total private dwellings, a change of 8.8% from its 2011 population of 488. With a land area of 1.68 km^{2} (0.65 sq mi), it had a population density of 316.1/km^{2} (818.6/sq mi) in 2016.

== See also ==
- List of communities in Alberta
- List of former urban municipalities in Alberta
- List of hamlets in Alberta
