= Campsie, Alberta =

Campsie
- Hamlet
- Location of Campsie Campsie (Canada) Campsie (North America)
- Coordinates: 54°07′40″N 114°38′48″W
- Country: Canada
- Province: Alberta
- Region: Central Alberta
- Census division: 13
- Municipal district: County of Barrhead No. 11

Government
  - Type: Unincorporated
  - Governing body: County of Barrhead No. 11 Council

Population (1991)
  - Total: 65
- Time zone: UTC−06:00 (Alberta Time)
- Area codes: 780, 587, 825

Campsie is a hamlet in central Alberta within the County of Barrhead No. 11, located approximately 17 kilometres (11 mi) west of Barrhead then 1 kilometre (0.62 mi) north of Highway 18, roughly 101 kilometres (63 mi) northwest of Edmonton. It has an elevation of 660 m (2,170 ft).

The hamlet took its name, in 1909, from Campsie, in Scotland, the ancestral home of an early postmaster. The post office operated until 1969. The community was a block settlement established by Black Canadian homesteaders from Oklahoma and Texas, within four to five years of Alberta becoming a province in 1905.

Climate data for Campsie, Alberta (1991–2020 normals, extremes 1912–present)
Month	Jan	Feb	Mar	Apr	May	Jun	Jul	Aug	Sep	Oct	Nov	Dec	Year
Record high °C (°F)	20.5 (68.9)	18.3 (64.9)	20.6 (69.1)	29.4 (84.9)	33.3 (91.9)	37.8 (100.0)	37.2 (99.0)	35.0 (95.0)	32.0 (89.6)	30.0 (86.0)	22.2 (72.0)	16.0 (60.8)	37.8 (100.0)
Mean daily maximum °C (°F)	−6.6 (20.1)	−3.1 (26.4)	1.8 (35.2)	10.5 (50.9)	17.5 (63.5)	20.9 (69.6)	23.5 (74.3)	22.5 (72.5)	17.6 (63.7)	9.6 (49.3)	−0.1 (31.8)	−5.8 (21.6)	9.0 (48.2)
Daily mean °C (°F)	−12.8 (9.0)	−10.0 (14.0)	−4.7 (23.5)	3.7 (38.7)	10.1 (50.2)	14.1 (57.4)	16.6 (61.9)	15.3 (59.5)	10.3 (50.5)	3.4 (38.1)	−5.3 (22.5)	−11.7 (10.9)	2.4 (36.4)
Mean daily minimum °C (°F)	−19.0 (−2.2)	−16.9 (1.6)	−11.2 (11.8)	−3.1 (26.4)	2.5 (36.5)	7.3 (45.1)	9.7 (49.5)	8.1 (46.6)	2.9 (37.2)	−2.9 (26.8)	−10.7 (12.7)	−17.5 (0.5)	−4.2 (24.4)
Record low °C (°F)	−51.7 (−61.1)	−50.6 (−59.1)	−44.5 (−48.1)	−32.2 (−26.0)	−12.2 (10.0)	−7.8 (18.0)	−2.8 (27.0)	−5.0 (23.0)	−17.2 (1.0)	−28.0 (−18.4)	−45.6 (−50.1)	−51.7 (−61.1)	−51.7 (−61.1)
Average precipitation mm (inches)	27.1 (1.07)	14.5 (0.57)	18.0 (0.71)	30.0 (1.18)	46.8 (1.84)	84.3 (3.32)	85.9 (3.38)	57.1 (2.25)	36.1 (1.42)	22.6 (0.89)	24.9 (0.98)	18.8 (0.74)	466.1 (18.35)
Average rainfall mm (inches)	0.4 (0.02)	0.4 (0.02)	0.7 (0.03)	19.7 (0.78)	45.6 (1.80)	86.5 (3.41)	87.5 (3.44)	56.4 (2.22)	36.5 (1.44)	12.6 (0.50)	1.4 (0.06)	0.1 (0.00)	347.8 (13.72)
Average snowfall cm (inches)	29.4 (11.6)	13.6 (5.4)	18.4 (7.2)	10.0 (3.9)	2.6 (1.0)	0.0 (0.0)	0.0 (0.0)	0.0 (0.0)	0.4 (0.2)	9.8 (3.9)	23.7 (9.3)	20.4 (8.0)	128.3 (50.5)
Average precipitation days (≥ 0.2 mm)	9.4	7.0	8.2	7.3	10.0	14.5	14.6	12.6	10.0	8.4	8.6	7.4	118.0
Average rainy days (≥ 0.2 mm)	0.26	0.17	0.50	4.5	9.6	14.1	14.5	12.6	9.0	5.5	0.79	0.09	71.61
Average snowy days (≥ 0.2 cm)	7.9	5.3	6.8	2.9	0.68	0.0	0.0	0.0	0.18	2.3	7.4	7.1	40.56
Source: Environment Canada

== Demographics ==
Campsie recorded a population of 65 in the 1991 Census of Population conducted by Statistics Canada.

== See also ==
- List of communities in Alberta
- List of hamlets in Alberta
- Similar 1908 to 1910 Alberta homesteader settlements of Black Canadians:
  - Amber Valley, Alberta
  - Junkins (now Wildwood), Alberta
  - Keystone (now Breton), Alberta
