= Athabasca Landing Trail =

Long-distance portage route in Canada

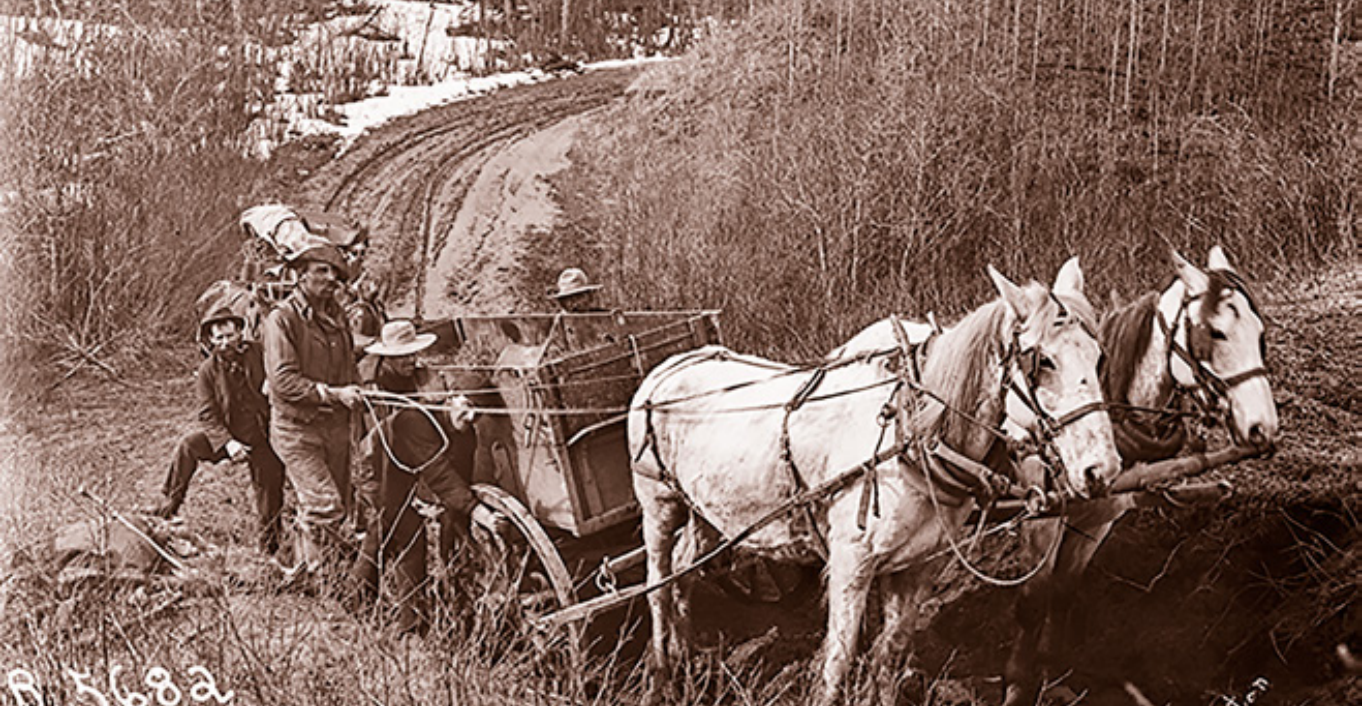
The trail was primitive, and muddy sections were particularly hard to traverse.

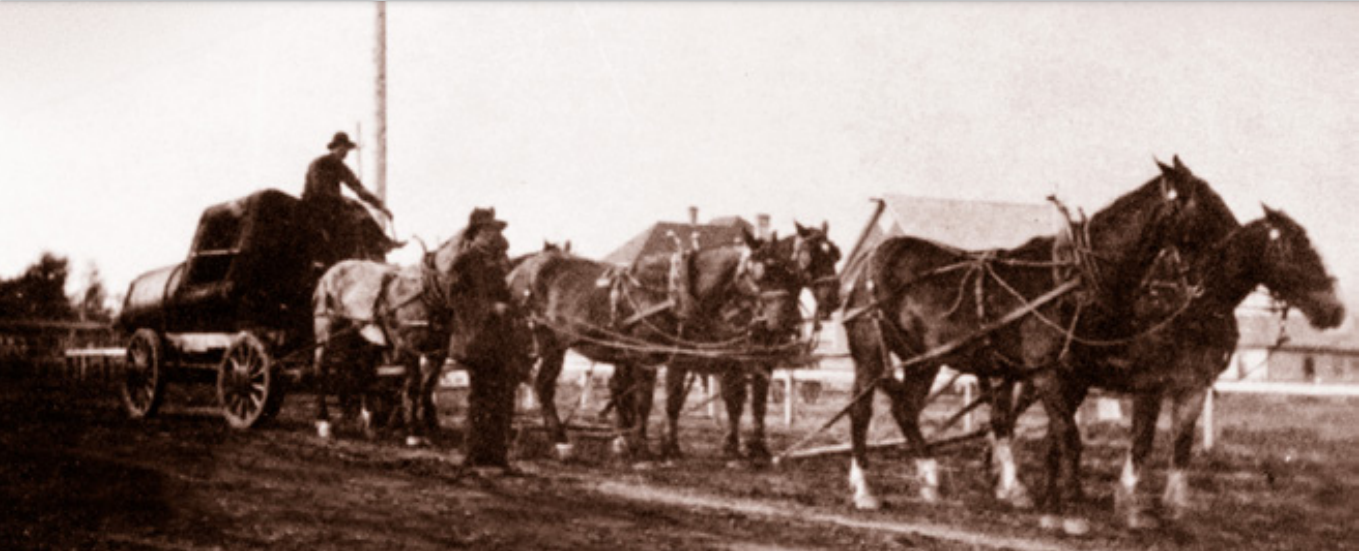
A six-horse team transporting a boiler on the Athabasca Trail.

The Athabasca Landing Trail was a long-distance portage route that linked Fort Edmonton (modern day Edmonton, Alberta) on the North Saskatchewan River with Athabasca Landing (modern day Athabasca, Alberta) on the Athabasca River. The distance of the trail between Fort Edmonton and Athabasca Landing was 100 miles (160 km), giving the trail the nickname "The 100 Mile Portage."

The Saskatchewan flows east and its waters flow into the Nelson River which drains into Hudson Bay. The Athabasca flows north and joins the Slave River, which itself joins the Mackenzie River which drains into the Arctic Ocean. The Edmonton-Athabasca portage, therefore, had local economic significance and was also part of a wide trade network that linked the Arctic and sub-arctic to the Hudson Bay, central Canada and overseas to Europe.

Various portage routes between the two rivers had been used by the Indigenous peoples of the region for centuries before the arrival of British and Canadian fur traders in the region in the late eighteenth century. Once fur trading posts were established in the region, the simple trails were used to move freight between the posts. They linked Fort Edmonton (in its various incarnations over the years), the centre of the Saskatchewan District, to posts in the Athabasca District (including the Peace River Country) such as Dunvegan, Fort St. Mary's, Fort Chipewyan, and Fort Vermilion. The main packroute northwards from Edmonton from 1824 to 1876 was that to Fort Assiniboine, well to the west of the later Athabasca Landing Trail. It was due to Hudson's Bay Company scouts seeking an alternative to the Fort Assiniboine route that Athabasca Landing was founded in 1876.

The North-West Mounted Police stationed nine officers at Athabasca Landing in 1893.

In 2010, a conceptual master plan for the modern version of the Athabasca Landing Trail was completed. The plan is to build a 150 km (93-mile) non-motorized recreational trail, which runs between Fort Saskatchewan and Athabasca, and highlights the region's historic and natural features. The route is also designated as part of the Trans Canada Trail; it links to the River Valley Alliance Trail in the south and to both the land and water routes north to the Arctic Ocean.

== See also ==
- York Factory Express
