= Manola, Alberta =

Manola
- Hamlet
- Location of Manola Manola (Canada)
- Coordinates: 54°05′53″N 114°13′58″W
- Country: Canada
- Province: Alberta
- Region: Central Alberta
- Census division: 13
- Municipal district: County of Barrhead No. 11

Government
  - Type: Unincorporated
  - Governing body: County of Barrhead No. 11 Council

Population (1991)
  - Total: 29
- Time zone: UTC−06:00 (Alberta Time)
- Area codes: 780, 587, 825

Manola is a hamlet in central Alberta within the County of Barrhead No. 11, located 6 kilometres (3.7 mi) south of Highway 18, approximately 65 kilometres (40 mi) northwest of St. Albert.

== Demographics ==
Manola recorded a population of 29 in the 1991 Census of Population conducted by Statistics Canada.

== See also ==
- List of communities in Alberta
- List of hamlets in Alberta
