= Swan Hills (Alberta) =

Geographic region in Alberta, Canada

The Swan Hills are part of the Alberta High Plains, lying within a physiographic region called the Swan Hills Upland. Reaching to 1,328 m (4,357 ft) above sea level, Wallace and Goose Mountains form the high terrain, with a radial drainage network that feeds the Smoky, Slave, and Athabasca Rivers. Regarded by some as "Alberta's forgotten wilderness", this forested and sparsely populated region has a rich natural and cultural history and is the namesake of the Town of Swan Hills.

== First Nations history ==
Named by the Cree for "legendary giant swans whose thundering wings would fill the air", the Swan Hills lie within Treaty 8 territories, in the vicinity of Swan River First Nation. The Swan River First Nation is a Woodland Cree nation that is one of the original negotiators and signatories to Treaty 8. Today, the Swan River First Nation reserve is located on the south, central shore of Lesser Slave Lake, to the northwest of the Swan Hills. Although its history remains the subject of debate, the Cree name for Lesser Slave Lake possibly recognizes the Slavey or Dene people as the earliest inhabitants of the region. Indeed, both Lesser Slave Lake and the Swan Hills are central to oral accounts of past conflict between Cree and Dene peoples, as recounted by Cree elder Willie Okemow in 1973 (and later corroborated by Dene elder Cecile Antoine in Fort Simpson in 1973):

"You are of the fifth generation of Cree who moved into the boreal forest. About five thousand Cree under the leadership of Kinusieou moved into the bush from the South. They came over the Swan Hills (North-central Alberta today) and down the Swan River valley to the South shore of Lesser Slave Lake. There were five hundred and seventy warriors. They pushed the Dene North. There were three battles. The Cree won the first two. The Dene won the third. The Cree retreated south of the Peace River and called for talks. They explained to the Dene what was happening in the South and how to survive the Cree needed clean land away from small pox (sic) and other diseases. Although they won the war, the Dene agreed to give the Cree all the lands South and East of the Peace River. Together the Cree and Dene gave the river the name: Peace River. They accepted it as the new boundary between their territories."

== Geological history ==
The Swan Hills form part of the Western Canada Sedimentary Basin, within the southern tectonometamorphic region of the Peace River Arch. The landscape is underlain with bedrock dating from the late epoch of the Cretaceous period (65–136 million years old) to the Paleocene epoch of the Tertiary period (66–56 million years old). The Wapiti Formation is the dominant geological formation, comprising sandstone and siltstone with minor bentonite, mudstone and coral beds deposited in fluvial to lacustrine environments. The Paskapoo Formation forms another unit composed of sandstones, sandy shales, indurated and semi-indurated clays, and highly calcareous shales. These shales are resistant to erosion, forming creamy-coloured cliffs at several locations in the area. Most of the upland soils within the Swan Hills are Orthic or Gleyed Grey Luvisols having origin in glacial till or cobbly gravel of the Tertiary period. In the lowlands, soils are derived from peatlands due to minimal water drainage, and are generally low in organic matter.

The extensive bentonite and bentonitic mudstone found in the Swan Hills is composed of the clay mineral montmorillonite (also known as smectite) that has formed by alteration of volcanic ash. The ash source for these bentonite beds remains unknown, but may have derived from Upper Cretaceous felsic volcanism in the Cordillera of British Columbia during prolonged subduction and uplift, or it may have been generated more locally through ultramafic intrusions (e.g., kimberlites and alkaline basalts) within northern Alberta, if not within the Swan Hills themselves.

The Swan Hills are a region of both anthropological and biogeographical interest, lying within the ice-free corridor that formed with the deglaciation of Laurentide and Cordilleran ice sheets somewhere between 16 and 14 thousand years ago. The prominent topographical features of the Swan Hills, such as discontinuous plateaus with glacial deposits and heavily dissected colluvial slopes, speak to this complex history of glaciation.

== Natural history ==
The Swan Hills exhibit an extensive array of boreal ecosystems, including old growth mixed coniferous forests, pine forests, poplar forests, shrublands, muskegs, lakes, bogs, carrs and patterned fens. These ecosystems are home to a flora and fauna that is unique within the province, including many mountain and northern plants at the eastern and southern limits of their range and a few species (e.g., devil's club) more typical of the wet belts of British Columbia. Common tree species include balsam fir (Abies balsamea), white spruce (Picea glauca), black spruce (Picea mariana), lodgepole pine (Pinus contorta ssp. latifolia), tamarack (Larix laricina), trembling aspen (Populus tremuloides), balsam poplar (Populus balsamifera) and paper birch (Betula papyrifera). Notable wildlife species include moose (Alces alces), white-tailed deer (Odocoileus virginianus), spruce grouse (Canachites canadensis), red-tailed hawk (Buteo jamaicensis), mallard (Anas platyrhynchos), blue-winged teal (Spatula discors), yellow perch (Perca flavescens), northern pike (Esox lucius), lake whitefish (Coregonus clupeaformis), red fox (Vulpes vulpes), Canada lynx (Lynx canadensis), coyote (Canis latrans), wolf (Canis lupus), American black bear (Ursus americanus), and grizzly bear (Ursus arctos horribilis).

The Swan Hills grizzlies are a small population estimated at around 23 individuals. These grizzlies are considered among the largest in the world, rivalled only by the Kodiak bear. In 1853, a massive grizzly was shot in the Swan Hills by an elderly Indigenous woman, Bella Twin. The animal's skull measured over 16 9/10 inches long and 9 14/16 inches wide. At the time, it was recorded as the world record grizzly skull, though it has since lost this status as the grizzly bear species concept was expanded to include the large brown bears from coastal western North America. Given their large stature, it has been theorized that the Swan Hills grizzlies may have descended from the now extirpated plains grizzly bear.
