= Camp Creek, Alberta =

Unincorporated community in Alberta, Canada

Coordinates: 54°15′14″N 114°35′28″W

Location of Camp Creek, Alberta

Camp Creek is an unincorporated community in central Alberta, Canada, within the County of Barrhead No. 11. It is located 2 kilometres (1.2 mi) east of Highway 33, approximately 104 kilometres (65 mi) northwest of Edmonton.
