= Peers, Alberta =

Community in Alberta, Canada

Peers
- Hamlet
- Location of Peers in Alberta
- Coordinates: 53°39′57″N 115°59′33″W
- Country: Canada
- Province: Alberta
- Census division: No. 14
- Municipal district: Yellowhead County

Area (2021)
  - Land: 0.9 km^{2} (0.35 sq mi)

Population (2021)
  - Total: 91
  - Density: 101.5/km^{2} (263/sq mi)
- Time zone: UTC−06:00 (Alberta Time)

Peers is a hamlet in west-central Alberta, Canada within Yellowhead County. It is located on Highway 32, 8 kilometres (5.0 mi) north of the Yellowhead Highway (Highway 16) and approximately 35 kilometres (22 mi) northeast of Edson. January Creek, a tributary of the McLeod River flows directly adjacent to the hamlet. Peers is also home to the annual Peers Gold Dust Daze, which takes place ~3 miles north of the hamlet.

Statistics Canada recognizes Peers as a designated place.

== Demographics ==
Population history of Peers
Year	Pop.	±%
1941	79	—
1951	56	−29.1%
1956	98	+75.0%
1961	128	+30.6%
1966	120	−6.2%
1971	129	+7.5%
1976	162	+25.6%
1981	111	−31.5%
1986	138	+24.3%
1991	113	−18.1%
1991A	114	+0.9%
1996	119	+4.4%
2001	120	+0.8%
2006	113	−5.8%
2011	108	−4.4%
2016	98	−9.3%
2021	91	−7.1%
Source: Statistics Canada

In the 2021 Census of Population conducted by Statistics Canada, Peers had a population of 91 living in 49 of its 62 total private dwellings, a change of −7.1% from its 2016 population of 98. With a land area of 0.9 km^{2} (0.35 sq mi), it had a population density of 101.1/km^{2} (261.9/sq mi) in 2021.

As a designated place in the 2016 Census of Population conducted by Statistics Canada, Peers had a population of 98 living in 48 of its 56 total private dwellings, a change of −9.3% from its 2011 population of 108. With a land area of 0.91 km^{2} (0.35 sq mi), it had a population density of 107.7/km^{2} (278.9/sq mi) in 2016.

== Notable people ==
- Katie Ohe: sculptor

== See also ==
- List of communities in Alberta
- List of designated places in Alberta
- List of hamlets in Alberta
