= Klondike Trail =

Former Canadian trail

- Length: 120 mi (190 km)
- Location: Northern Alberta
- Trailheads: Fort Assiniboine; Grouard
- Use: Prospecting, Mining

The Klondike Trail or Chalmers Trail was an overland route to the Klondike Gold Rush in the Yukon, Canada. Prospectors were reaching the Klondike via the American route over the Chilkoot Pass, and a northern (water) route via Edmonton and the Athabasca River. Edmonton's merchants, however, promoted an overland route, which appeared shorter on the map, but proved to be arduous, treacherous, and took much longer to travel.

In attempt to improve the most deadly part of the trail between Fort Assiniboine and Lesser Slave Lake, the North-West Territorial government in Regina sent territorial road engineer Thomas W. Chalmers to survey and cut a new trail. Attempting to bypass muskeg and without consulting the local Indigenous people, who may have helped him find a better route, Chalmers set out in September 1897. He surveyed a route which traversed the highest point in the Swan Hills, about 20 kilometres east of the present day town of Swan Hills, nearly paralleling present-day Alberta Highway 33. He returned to Edmonton on November 7.

In the spring and summer of 1898 he and a road-cutting party cut 240 miles (390 km) of what was expected to be a wagon trail out of the heavy bush. The trail started at Pruden's Crossing on the Athabasca River near Fort Assiniboine then headed north to the shore of Lesser Slave Lake near what would become Kinuso. From there it was still another 2,500 kilometres north to the gold fields. Chalmers declared the trail passable in July. It was a very difficult trail, taking some travellers months to cover. Travellers endured great danger and back-breaking labour. An estimated 2,000 horses died due to lack of feed, poor packing techniques and exhaustion.

Many human deaths were reported on the trail from Edmonton to the Klondike gold fields. The grave of an unidentified little girl is still marked along the trail east of Fort Assiniboine. Louis Day got part way on the journey, gave up and died during his return trip to Edmonton. Captain J.H. Mason, leader of the Philadelphia party making the journey, drowned perhaps on the Liard River. Alexander David Stewart, who was mayor of Hamilton 1894-1895, joined the gold rush and died of scurvy at the confluence of the Peel and Beaver rivers in March 1899. The Helpman party was plagued by misfortune - Capt. Alleyne died at Edmonton; one person suffered an ankle sprain; two others suffered broken bones. And that was before the party had gone past St. Albert, just outside Edmonton. H. Burbank, a furtrader, came out of the Northland to report that many travellers had died on the Liard River.

The gold rush was over about the time Chalmers finished his trail. The last Yukon party to use the trail left Edmonton in August 1898. Use of the trail declined by 1901–02.

The trail is mostly grown over now, although in places near Fort Assiniboine, wagon ruts are still visible.

== See also ==
- Chilkoot Trail from the coast of Alaska to Northern BC
