= Thunder Lake (Minnesota) =

Lake in the state of Minnesota, United States

- Location within Minnesota
- Location: Cass County, Minnesota
- Coordinates: 46°57′17″N 93°58′5″W
- Type: reservoir

Thunder Lake is a lake in Cass County, Minnesota, in the United States. Thunder Lake is 1,346 acres in size and reaches a depth of 95 feet. Thunder Lake is located in the western corner of the Mississippi River - Grand Rapids Watershed and is surrounded by dense forested areas including the Chippewa National Forest and the Land O'Lakes State Forest. The shoreline is approximately 16 miles long and 83% of the lake has a depth greater than 15 feet. Thunder Lake has high water clarity with a Secchi depth of approximately 17 feet.

"Thunder Lake" is likely an English translation of the Native American name.

== See also ==
- List of lakes in Minnesota
