= Tiger Lily, Alberta =

Coordinates: 54°10′54″N 114°46′31″W

Location of Tiger Lily Alberta

Tiger Lily is an unincorporated community in central Alberta within the County of Barrhead No. 11, located 8 kilometres (5.0 mi) northwest Highway 18, 96 kilometres (60 mi) northwest of St. Albert. It is named for the tiger lily flower.

Tiger Lily is a retirement and tourist destination. It is home to several retirement communities and Clear Lake Park, a camp and resort.

A ranch near Tiger Lily sells beef directly to the public.
