= Alberta Highway 32 =

Highway in Alberta, Canada

Highway 32

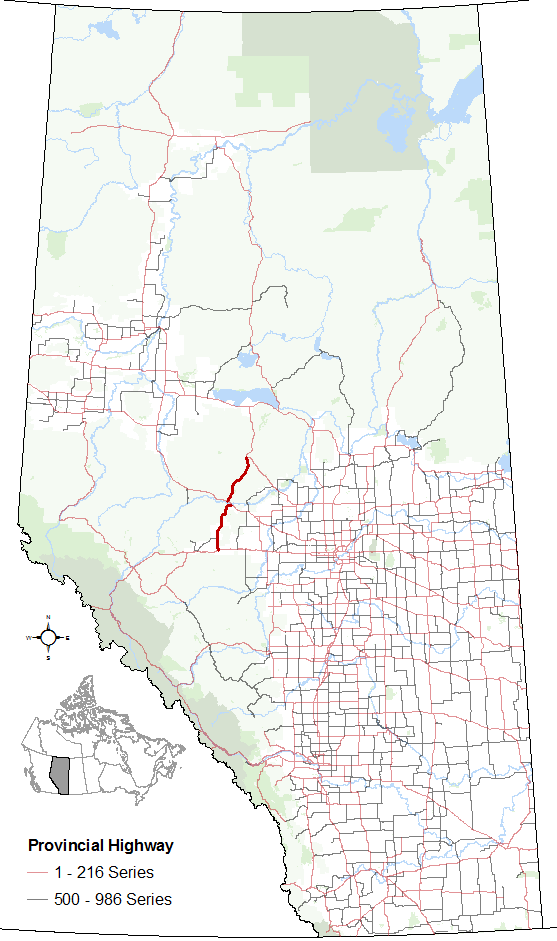

Route information
- Maintained by the Ministry of Transportation and Economic Corridors
- Length: 147.3 km (91.5 mi)

Major junctions
- South end: Highway 16 (TCH) near Carrot Creek
- Highway 43 in Whitecourt
- North end: Highway 33 in Swan Hills

Location
- Country: Canada
- Province: Alberta
- Specialized and rural municipalities: Yellowhead County, Woodlands County, Big Lakes County
- Towns: Whitecourt, Swan Hills

Highway system
- Alberta Provincial Highway Network; List; Former
← Highway 31	→ Highway 33

Alberta Provincial Highway No. 32, commonly referred to as Highway 32, is a north–south highway in west–central Alberta, Canada. From north to south, Highway 32 begins at its junction with Highway 33 in the Town of Swan Hills. It proceeds south for 69 km (43 mi) where it meets Highway 43 northwest of Whitecourt. After following Highway 43 southeast for 8 km (5.0 mi), Highway 32 continues south from Whitecourt for 72 km (45 mi), crossing the McLeod River, passing through the Hamlet of Peers, and ending at Highway 16 (Yellowhead Highway) approximately 32 km (20 mi) east of the Town of Edson.

== Major intersections ==
From south to north:

Rural/specialized municipality	Location	km	mi	Destinations	Notes
Yellowhead County		0.0	0.0	Highway 16 (TCH/YH) – Edson, Jasper, Edmonton	
Yellowhead County	Peers	8.1	5.0	UAR 197 west	
Yellowhead County		13.1	8.1	Crosses the McLeod River	
Yellowhead County		16.9	10.5	Highway 748 west – Edson	
Woodlands County	No major junctions				
Whitecourt		70.8	44.0	Highway 43 south – Edmonton	South end of Highway 43 concurrency
Whitecourt		72.7	45.2	Crosses the Athabasca River	
Woodlands County		78.7	48.9	Highway 43 north – Valleyview, Grande Prairie	North end of Highway 43 concurrency
Woodlands County		89.1	55.4	UAR 142 east – Carson-Pegasus Provincial Park	
Big Lakes County	Swan Hills	147.3	91.5	Highway 33 – Kinuso, Peace River, Barrhead	
1.000 mi = 1.609 km; 1.000 km = 0.621 mi: Concurrency terminus
