= Fort Assiniboine =

- Hamlet
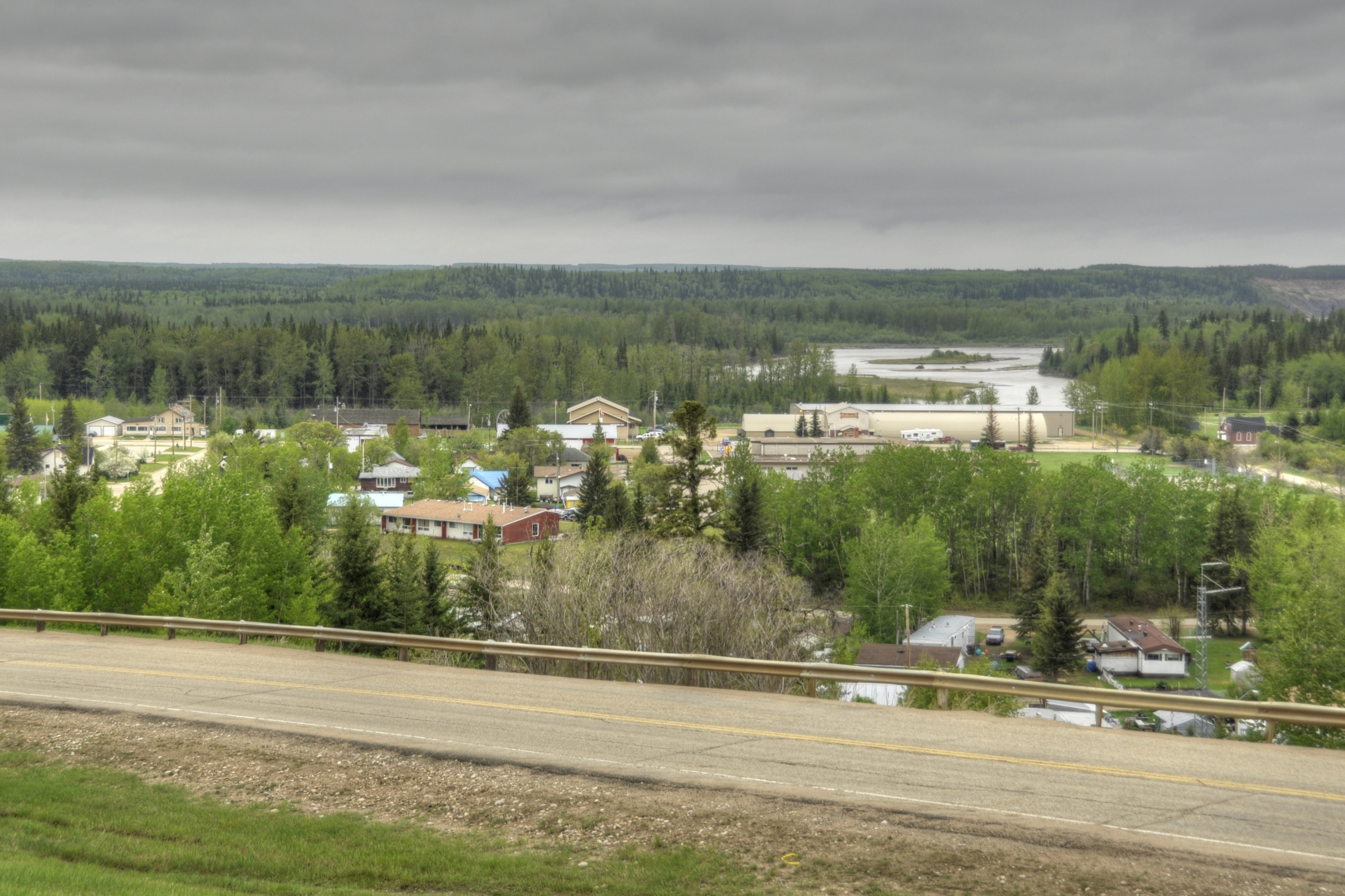
- Skyline and the Athabasca River

- Location in Woodlands County Location in Alberta Fort Assiniboine (Canada) Fort Assiniboine (North America)
- Coordinates: 54.3342°N 114.7747°W
- Country: Canada
- Province: Alberta
- Region: Northern Alberta
- Planning region: Upper Athabasca
- Municipal district: Woodlands

Government
  - Type: Unincorporated
  - Governing body: Woodlands County Council

Area (2021)
  - Land: 0.75 km^{2} (0.29 sq mi)

Population (2021)
  - Total: 158
  - Density: 212/km^{2} (550/sq mi)
- Time zone: UTC−06:00 (Alberta Time)

Fort Assiniboine
- Interactive map of Fort Assiniboine
- Type: Fort
- Location: Barrhead, Alberta, Canada
- Nearest city: Edmonton

Site notes
- Elevation: 604 m (1,982 ft)
- Governing body: Woodlands County Council

National Historic Site of Canada

Fort Assiniboine is a hamlet in northwest Alberta, Canada, within Woodlands County. It is located along the north shore of the Athabasca River at the junction of Highway 33 and Highway 661. It is approximately 39 kilometres (24 mi) northwest of Barrhead, 62 kilometres (39 mi) southeast of Swan Hills and 91 kilometres (57 mi) northeast of Whitecourt.

Fort Assiniboine was founded as a trading post by the Hudson's Bay Company and became a stopping point along the Klondike Trail. It gets its name from the Assiniboine people. The fort itself no longer exists, but the land on which it stood is designated as a National Historic Site for its archaeological value. The hamlet, built on and around the site of the fort, is now a local hub for the surrounding agricultural region.

== History ==
Local oral history tells of an early (possibly late 1700s) North West Company fur trading post south of Holmes Crossing (an early ferry crossing) on the Athabasca River. In 1821, the North West Company was merged with Hudson's Bay Company (HBC), who then undertook to reorganize its transportation routes, seeking out advantages and efficiencies in its operations. By then, trade on Lesser Slave Lake was in decline. The HBC council passed a resolution in 1823 calling for a fort further up the Athabasca River to reduce transport times from Edmonton to parts west and northwest. Under the new plan, Fort Assiniboine on the Athabasca River (the fort was originally named 'Athabaska River House') opened in 1824.

It became the northwest end of an overland 130-kilometre (80 mi) horse track to Edmonton House/Fort Edmonton, cut by Jacques Cardinal, a Métis free trader, in 1824–25. The trail became known as 'The Hudson's Bay Packtrail'.

The trail shortened travel time from Jasper House and the Athabasca Pass within the Rocky Mountains, to York Factory on the Hudson Bay. The old canoe route involved going far north-northeast down the Athabasca to Fort Chipewyan and then southeast through Methye Portage to Lake Winnipeg. The new route was used by the York Factory Express. A party on horseback could make the trip from Fort Assiniboine to Edmonton in two to six days, depending on conditions.

Though the fort at Fort Assiniboine never was as large as some other Alberta forts, its role as a transportation hub and provision centre ensured its survival from the 1820s to the 1880s. The fort burned to the ground after its abandonment by the HBC. No plans existed for its original layout, but, using clues from post administrators' log books and archaeological surveys, a replica was built on the site in 1980. It operates as a museum and friendship centre.

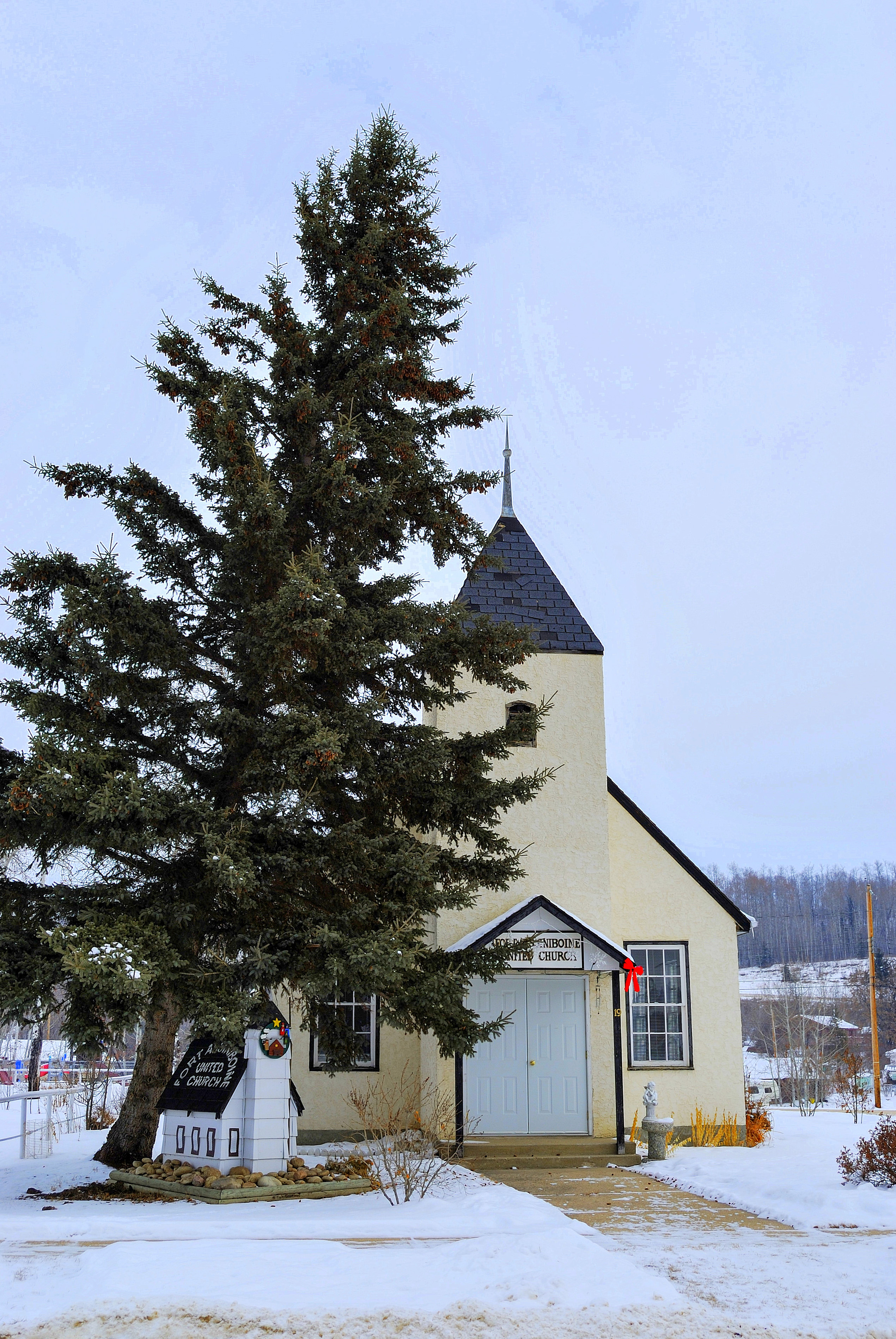
Fort Assiniboine United Church, built in 1948

In 1898, when the Chalmers, or Klondike Trail was cut through the Swan Hills, northwest of Fort Assiniboine to Lesser Slave Lake, the location again became a stopping point. A self-service ferry at the site carried gold seekers on their overland trek to the Yukon.

The earliest homesteads in the area were filed in 1906 in the Holmes Crossing district (named for the ferryman William B. Holmes), across the Athabasca and downriver from Fort Assiniboine. Most came via Edmonton, by way of the Hudson's Bay Pack Trail, which had been widened by then to accommodate wagons and sleighs. The graded road only went to about 16 km (10 mi) west of Morinville. By 1908 settlers crossed on the ferry and took up land north of the Athabasca River, including around the site of the old fort. The Fort Assiniboine post office was set up in 1910, operated, as was the practice, in a local farmhouse. Joseph Brewster was the first postmaster. A blacksmith's shop, and a store were soon built near the fort site. In 1914, the railway was built to Westlock, shortening the route on the trail significantly.

The first community hall was built in 1916. By 1919, the road to Holmes Crossing was graded. The next year, on the north side of the river, a road was graded from the ferry landing, to a bridge on the Freeman River west of Fort Assiniboine. In 1922, the post office was moved to the settlement.

The quarter-section of land on which the trading post had been situated had been homesteaded by a Dr. E.J. State in 1913. When he died in 1923, his property was willed to the University of Alberta, who surveyed and sold the lots, expanding the hamlet.

In 1927 a railway line was built to Barrhead, 40 kilometres (25 mi) away.

In 1934 the provincial government set up a public nursing service in the hamlet, which operated until 1969. The surrounding schools were centralized to Fort Assiniboine in 1946, and in the same year a charter was issued for a Fort Assiniboine Branch of the Royal Canadian Legion. A United Church and a Roman Catholic Church were built in 1948 and 1949. The curling club was formed and a rink built in 1953. In 1956 a bridge was built over the Athabasca River, putting the ferry out of business.

Fort Assiniboine was a hamlet until incorporated as a village in 1958. E.M. (Gene) Redington was the first mayor. The Village of Fort Assiniboine dissolved and reverted to hamlet status on December 31, 1991. It is now administered by Woodlands County, which has offices in the hamlet and in Whitecourt.

== Demographics ==
In the 2021 Census of Population conducted by Statistics Canada, Fort Assiniboine had a population of 158 living in 64 of its 74 total private dwellings, a change of −10.2% from its 2016 population of 176. With a land area of 0.75 km^{2} (0.29 sq mi), it had a population density of 210.7/km^{2} (545.6/sq mi) in 2021.

As a designated place in the 2016 Census of Population conducted by Statistics Canada, Fort Assiniboine had a population of 176 living in 78 of its 83 total private dwellings, a change of 13.5% from its 2011 population of 155. With a land area of 0.73 km^{2} (0.28 sq mi), it had a population density of 241.1/km^{2} (624.4/sq mi) in 2016.

== Attractions ==
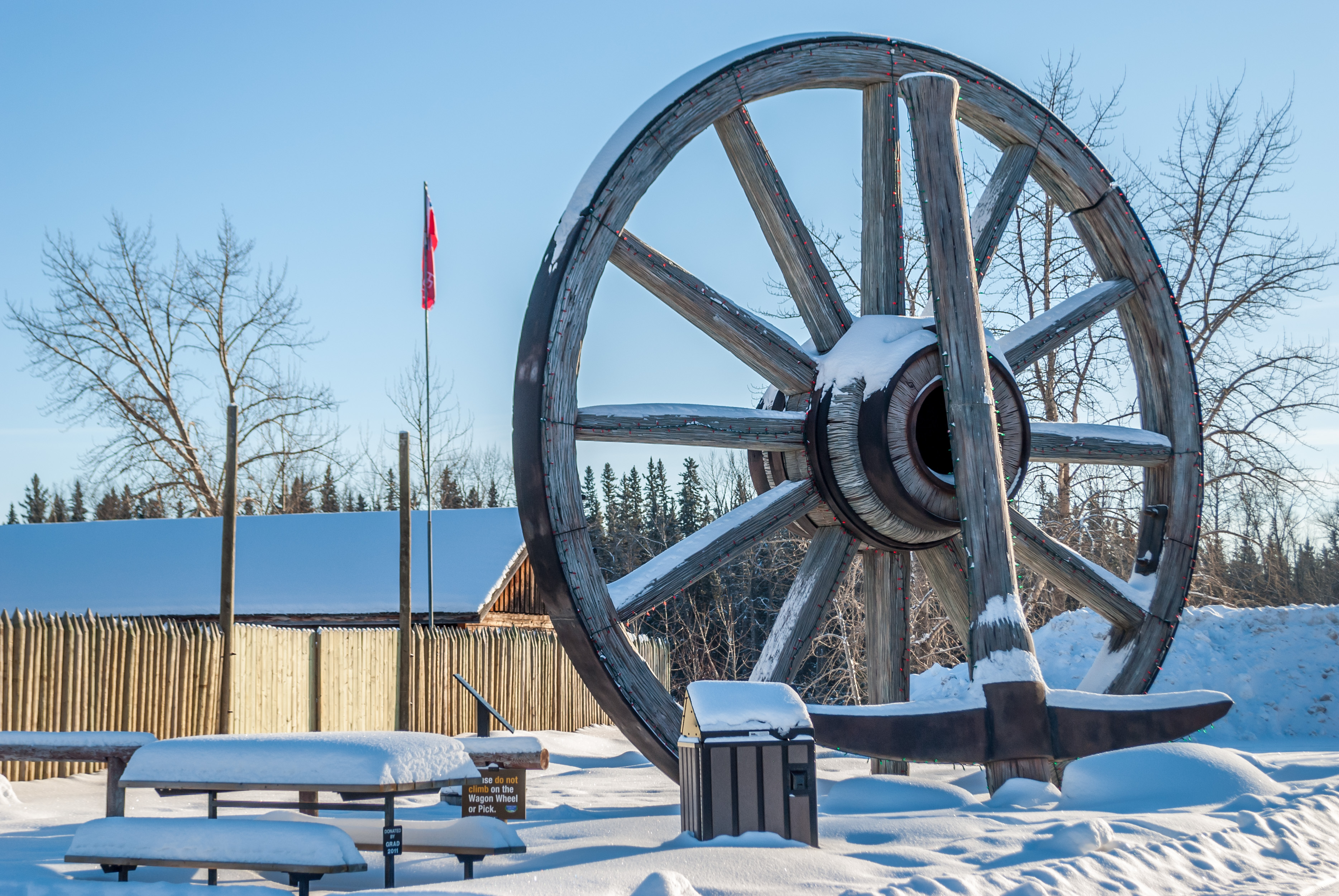
7.3 m (24 ft) wagon wheel and pick axe at Fort Assiniboine

Fort Assiniboine is home to a Hudson's Bay–style historical museum, known as the Fort Assiniboine Museum and Friendship Club Drop-In Centre, and the world's largest wagon wheel and pick axe. A boat launch east of the hamlet provides river-boaters access to the Athabasca River. There is also a private R.V. park and marina, which hosted the Athabasca River Voyageur Canoe Brigade in June 2017, celebrating Canada's 150th birthday. A farmer's market is held every Friday afternoon from May to September in the Recreation and Agriculture Building, which also hosts agricultural and sports events throughout the year including the annual Hamlet Hoedown Rodeo & Fair, held each August.

== Services ==
The Fort Assiniboine School, which offers kindergarten through Grade 9, is located within the hamlet. Students in Grades 10-12 are bussed to Barrhead Composite High School. Both are administered by Pembina Hills Public Schools (PHPS). Fort Assiniboine is also served by a post office and the Fort Assiniboine Public Library. It has numerous businesses including a general store, a motel, a gas station, a liquor store and a shop that repairs and sells all-terrain and other vehicles.

== Climate ==
Fort Assiniboine had a subarctic climate (Köppen Dfc), characterized by pleasant summers and frigid, although extremely variable, winters.

Climate data for Fort Assiniboine
Month	Jan	Feb	Mar	Apr	May	Jun	Jul	Aug	Sep	Oct	Nov	Dec	Year
Record high °C (°F)	13.0 (55.4)	17.0 (62.6)	17.0 (62.6)	29.5 (85.1)	34.0 (93.2)	33.3 (91.9)	32.0 (89.6)	33.0 (91.4)	33.0 (91.4)	29.0 (84.2)	18.5 (65.3)	13.3 (55.9)	34.0 (93.2)
Mean daily maximum °C (°F)	−8.2 (17.2)	−3.3 (26.1)	2.9 (37.2)	11.3 (52.3)	17.5 (63.5)	20.7 (69.3)	22.5 (72.5)	21.4 (70.5)	16.1 (61.0)	10.4 (50.7)	−1.1 (30.0)	−7.7 (18.1)	8.5 (47.3)
Daily mean °C (°F)	−14.8 (5.4)	−10.8 (12.6)	−4.2 (24.4)	3.7 (38.7)	9.7 (49.5)	13.5 (56.3)	15.6 (60.1)	14.4 (57.9)	9.1 (48.4)	3.4 (38.1)	−6.7 (19.9)	−13.9 (7.0)	1.6 (34.9)
Mean daily minimum °C (°F)	−21.4 (−6.5)	−18.2 (−0.8)	−11.3 (11.7)	−3.9 (25.0)	1.9 (35.4)	6.3 (43.3)	8.6 (47.5)	7.4 (45.3)	2.1 (35.8)	−3.5 (25.7)	−12.3 (9.9)	−20 (−4)	−5.4 (22.3)
Record low °C (°F)	−48 (−54)	−47 (−53)	−38.9 (−38.0)	−30 (−22)	−8.5 (16.7)	−2.8 (27.0)	1.7 (35.1)	−4 (25)	−11 (12)	−30 (−22)	−38.3 (−36.9)	−46 (−51)	−48 (−54)
Average precipitation mm (inches)	18.6 (0.73)	15.5 (0.61)	16.1 (0.63)	24.0 (0.94)	48.9 (1.93)	105.3 (4.15)	118.7 (4.67)	83.2 (3.28)	44.0 (1.73)	16.9 (0.67)	18.6 (0.73)	23.4 (0.92)	533.2 (20.99)
Source: Environment Canada

== See also ==
- Athabasca Landing Trail
- List of communities in Alberta
- List of former urban municipalities in Alberta
- List of hamlets in Alberta
