= Goose Lake, Alberta =

Goose Lake
- Hamlet
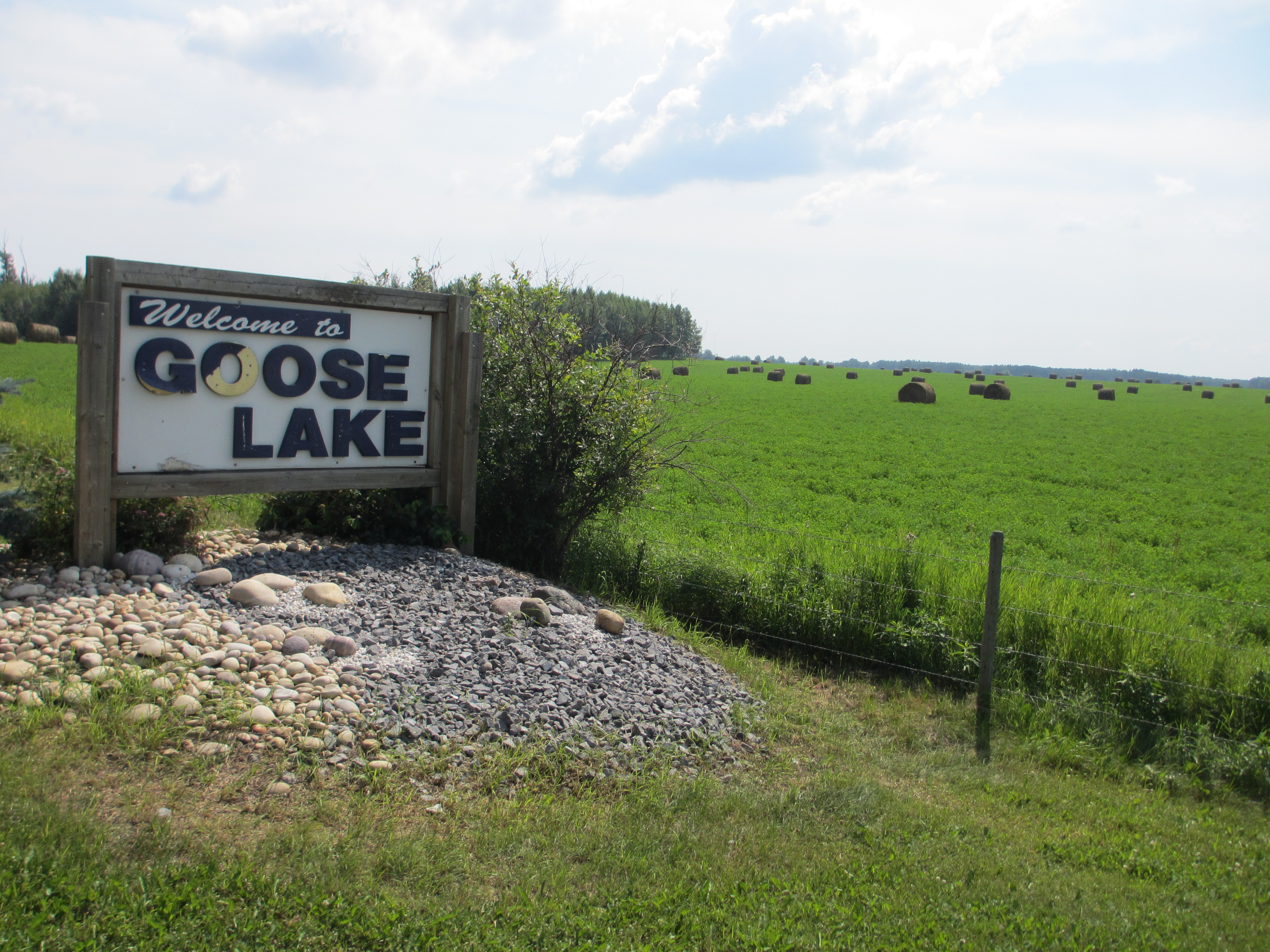

- Location in Alberta Location in Canada Location in North America
- Coordinates: 54.3058°N 115.1147°W
- Country: Canada
- Province: Alberta
- Region: Central Alberta
- Census division: No. 13
- Municipal district: Woodlands County

Population
  - Total: 11
- Time zone: UTC−06:00 (Alberta Time)

Goose Lake, also known as Lone Pine, is a hamlet in northwest Alberta, Canada within Woodlands County. It is located approximately 37 kilometres (23 mi) northeast of Highway 43 and 136 kilometres (85 mi) northwest of Edmonton.

Goose Lake is often referred to as Lone Pine due to the location of its former post office at the former Lone Pine Store, which was located near the intersection of Highway 658 and Township Road 614B—the road that provides access to the hamlet and the Goose Lake Campground.

== Demographics ==
The population of Goose Lake according to Alberta Transportation's Basic Municipal Transportation Grant funding program is 11.

== See also ==
- List of communities in Alberta
- List of hamlets in Alberta
