= Blue Ridge, Alberta =

Blue Ridge
- Hamlet
- Location of Blue Ridge in Alberta
- Coordinates: 54.1250°N 115.3778°W
- Country: Canada
- Province: Alberta
- Census division: No. 13
- Municipal district: Woodlands County

Government
  - Type: Unincorporated
  - Governing body: Woodlands County Council

Area (2021)
  - Land: 2.98 km^{2} (1.15 sq mi)

Population (2021)
  - Total: 211
  - Density: 70.8/km^{2} (183/sq mi)
- Time zone: UTC−06:00 (Alberta Time)

Blue Ridge is a hamlet in northwest Alberta, Canada within Woodlands County. It is located on Highway 658, 7 kilometres (4.3 mi) north of Highway 43 and 3 kilometres (1.9 mi) south of the Athabasca River. It is midway between the towns of Whitecourt and Mayerthorpe and approximately 159 kilometres (99 mi) northwest of Edmonton.

== Economy ==
A lumber mill to the north of Blue Ridge, operated by Blue Ridge Lumber Inc., is the main employer for the community. The hamlet also offers services to the oil and gas industry and the surrounding agricultural community.

== Demographics ==
Population history of Blue Ridge
Year	Pop.	±%
1941	76	—
1951	145	+90.8%
1956	195	+34.5%
1961	233	+19.5%
1966	187	−19.7%
1971	239	+27.8%
1976	195	−18.4%
1981	165	−15.4%
1986	163	−1.2%
1991	232	+42.3%
1991A	234	+0.9%
1996	274	+17.1%
2001	230	−16.1%
2006	208	−9.6%
2011	239	+14.9%
2016	244	+2.1%
2021	211	−13.5%
Source: Statistics Canada

In the 2021 Census of Population conducted by Statistics Canada, Blue Ridge had a population of 211 living in 89 of its 97 total private dwellings, a change of −13.5% from its 2016 population of 244. With a land area of 2.98 km^{2} (1.15 sq mi), it had a population density of 70.8/km^{2} (183.4/sq mi) in 2021.

As a designated place in the 2016 Census of Population conducted by Statistics Canada, Blue Ridge had a population of 244 living in 101 of its 105 total private dwellings, a change of 2.1% from its 2011 population of 239. With a land area of 2.98 km^{2} (1.15 sq mi), it had a population density of 81.9/km^{2} (212.1/sq mi) in 2016.

== See also ==
- List of communities in Alberta
- List of designated places in Alberta
- List of hamlets in Alberta
