= Swan Hills =

- Town
- Town of Swan Hills
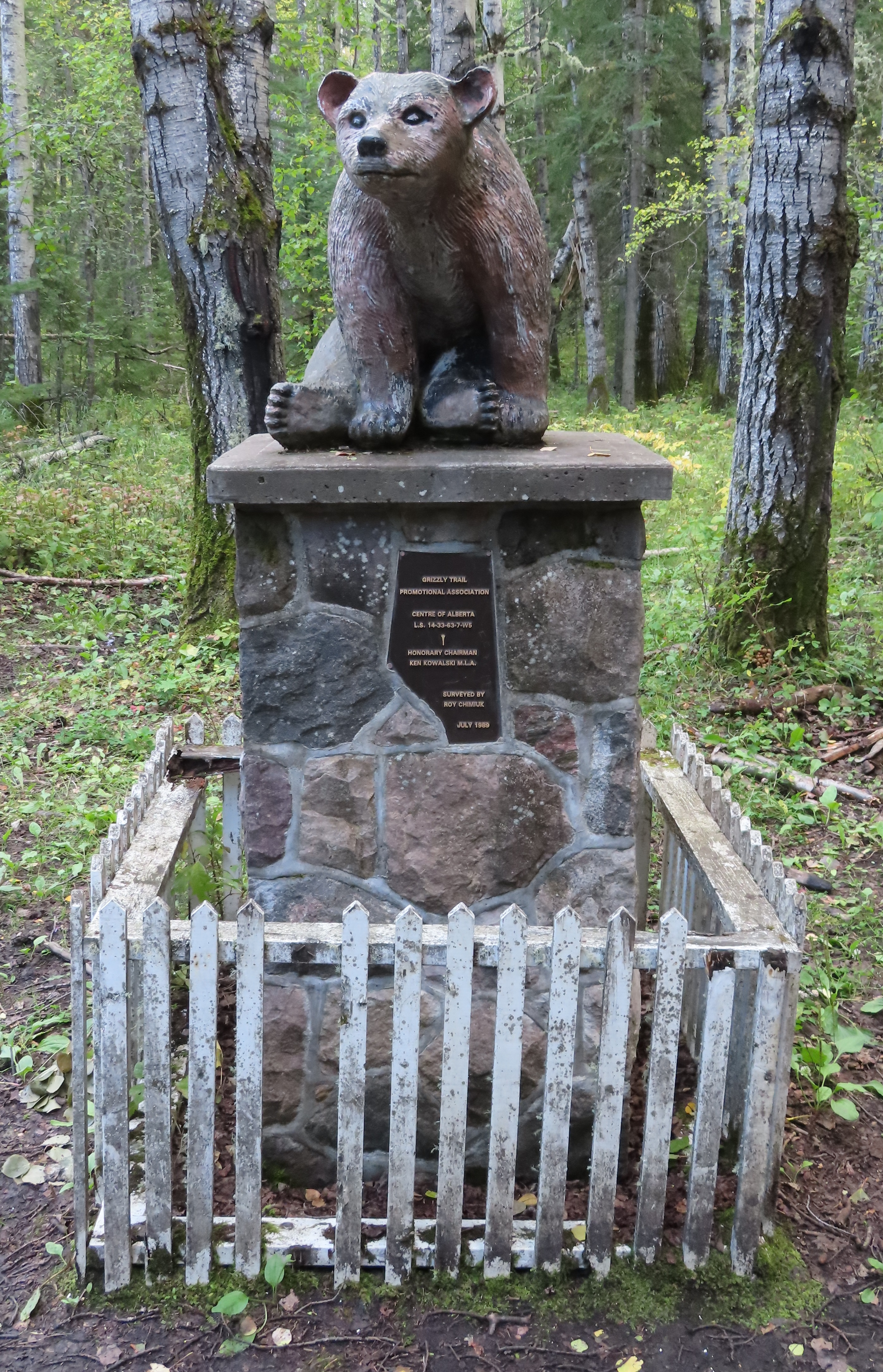
- Centre of Alberta Natural Area

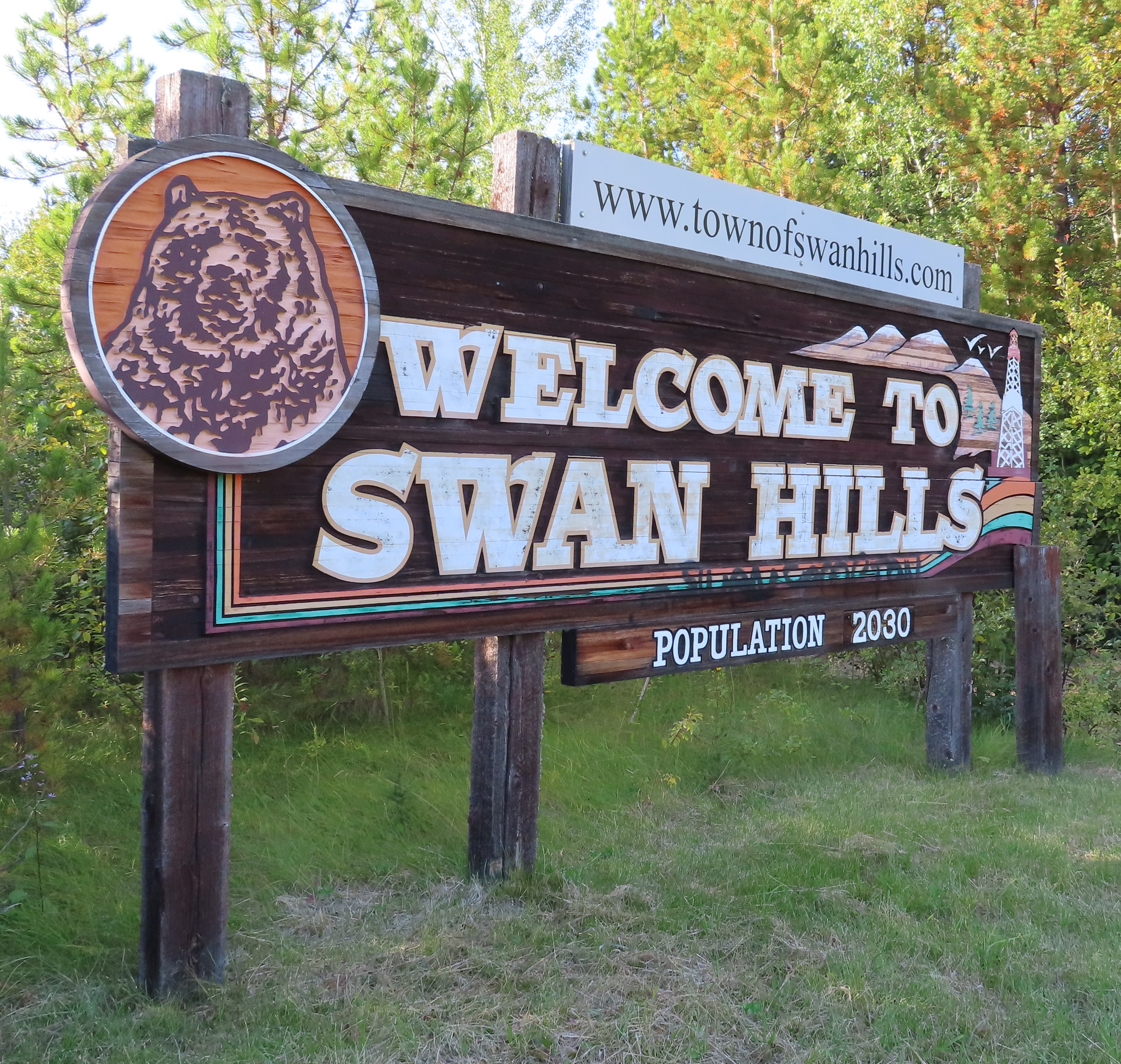
- Flag Welcome sign

- Location in Big Lakes County Location in Alberta
- Coordinates: 54°42′38″N 115°24′48″W
- Country: Canada
- Province: Alberta
- Planning region: Upper Athabasca
- Municipal district: Big Lakes County
- Incorporated
  - New town: September 1, 1959
  - Town: January 1, 1967

Government
  - Mayor: Craig Wilson
  - Governing body: Swan Hills Town Council

Area (2021)
  - Land: 25.87 km^{2} (9.99 sq mi)
- Elevation: 1,113 m (3,652 ft)

Population (2021)
  - Total: 1,201
  - Density: 46.4/km^{2} (120/sq mi)
- Time zone: UTC−06:00 (Alberta Time)
- Postal code span: T0G 2C0
- Area codes: 780, 587, 825
- Highways: Highway 32; Highway 33
- Waterways: Morse River; Freeman River
- Website: townofswanhills.com

Swan Hills is a town in northern Alberta, Canada. It is in the eponymous Swan Hills, approximately 80 km (50 mi) north of Whitecourt and 62 km (39 mi) northwest of Fort Assiniboine. The town is at the junction of Highway 32 and Grizzly Trail, and is surrounded by Big Lakes County.

It is the nearest major settlement to the geographic centre of the province. In 1989, local resident Roy Chimiuk used a minimum bounding box method to place a cairn marking the exact location at 54°30′N 115°0′W, about 30 kilometres south of the town. The site is protected by the Centre of Alberta Natural Area, a 3-kilometre hike from Highway 33.

== History ==
Initially a base camp for workers in the Swan Hills oilfield, accommodations and facilities were moved from a nearby site and jointly developed in the present location by the government of Alberta and oil companies between 1959 and 1961. Casually nicknamed 'Oil Hills', the town's official name was taken from the area of densely forested uplands in which it is located, although 'Chalmers' was also considered, after T.W. Chalmers, who had surveyed and cut the Klondike Trail through the area.

The New Town of Swan Hills was incorporated on September 1, 1959, and R.L. Maxfield was appointed as Development Officer and Secretary Treasurer. Twenty-four parcels of industrial land were sold at the first land auction in November 1959. The first all-weather road into the area was completed in 1960, replacing the treacherous forestry road connecting Swan Hills to Fort Assiniboine; the Swan Hills Post Office was opened the same year. The New Town of Swan Hills was officially opened by Premier Ernest Manning in June 1962.

Two teachers provided instruction for forty students in the first two-room school, which was quickly replaced by a seven-room building due to the rapidly increasing population as oil field workers began to relocate their families to the town. Two mobile radio units provided communications and an isolated diesel generating plant provided power until Alberta Government Telephones installed service and Canadian Utilities Ltd. completed a 138 kilometres (86 mi) transmission line in 1960. In November 1965, Swan Hills became the most northerly town in Alberta to be served with natural gas by Northwestern Utilities.

Swan Hills' status was changed when it was formally incorporated as a town on January 1, 1967, making it the first town incorporated during Canada's centennial year. Tom Parkinson was elected the first mayor, serving in the position until 1971.

Situated within dense boreal forest, Swan Hills has been evacuated at least 6 times as wildfires threatened the town: 1972, 1981, 1983, twice in 1998, once in 2023 and the most recent in May 2025 due to the Grizzly Complex wildfire. The town has since implemented a FireSmart program, reducing fire fuel within and around the urban perimeter.

== Demographics ==
Federal census population history
Year	Pop.	±%
1961	643	—
1966	1,414	+119.9%
1971	1,376	−2.7%
1976	2,012	+46.2%
1981	2,497	+24.1%
1986	2,403	−3.8%
1991	2,348	−2.3%
1996	2,030	−13.5%
2001	1,807	−11.0%
2006	1,645	−9.0%
2011	1,465	−10.9%
2016	1,301	−11.2%
Source: Statistics Canada

In the 2021 Census of Population conducted by Statistics Canada, the Town of Swan Hills had a population of 1,201 living in 512 of its 728 total private dwellings, a change of −7.7% from its 2016 population of 1,301. With a land area of 25.87 km^{2} (9.99 sq mi), it had a population density of 46.4/km^{2} (120.2/sq mi) in 2021.

In the 2016 Census of Population conducted by Statistics Canada, the Town of Swan Hills recorded a population of 1,301 living in 535 of its 724 total private dwellings, a change of −11.2% from its 2011 population of 1,465. With a land area of 26.12 km^{2} (10.08 sq mi), it had a population density of 49.8/km^{2} (129.0/sq mi) in 2016.

== Economy ==
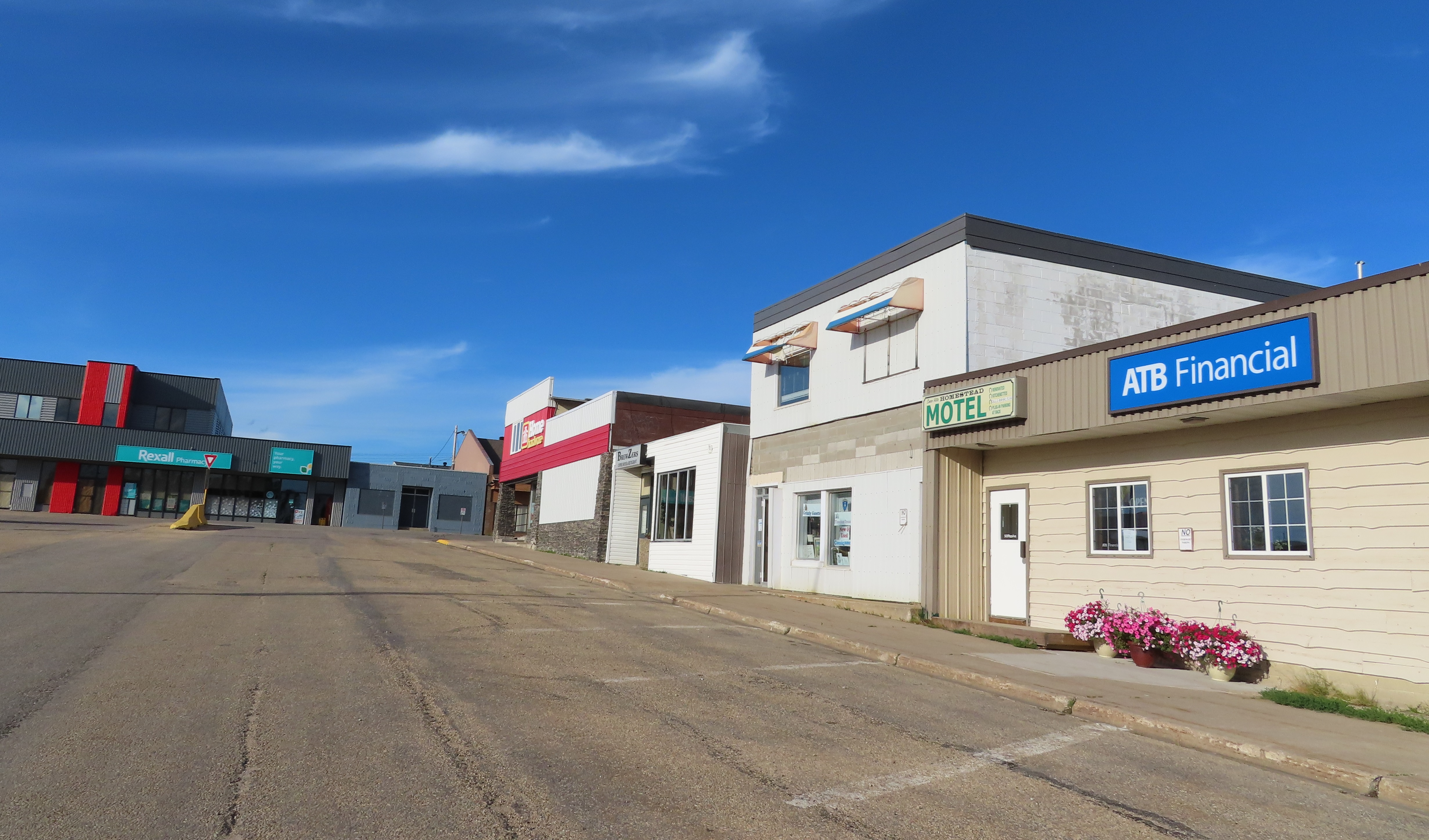
Retail district

The primary industry in Swan Hills is oil and gas, although the Swan Hills Treatment Centre, north of the town, is also a local employer. It is also a service centre for the logging industry.

== Attractions ==
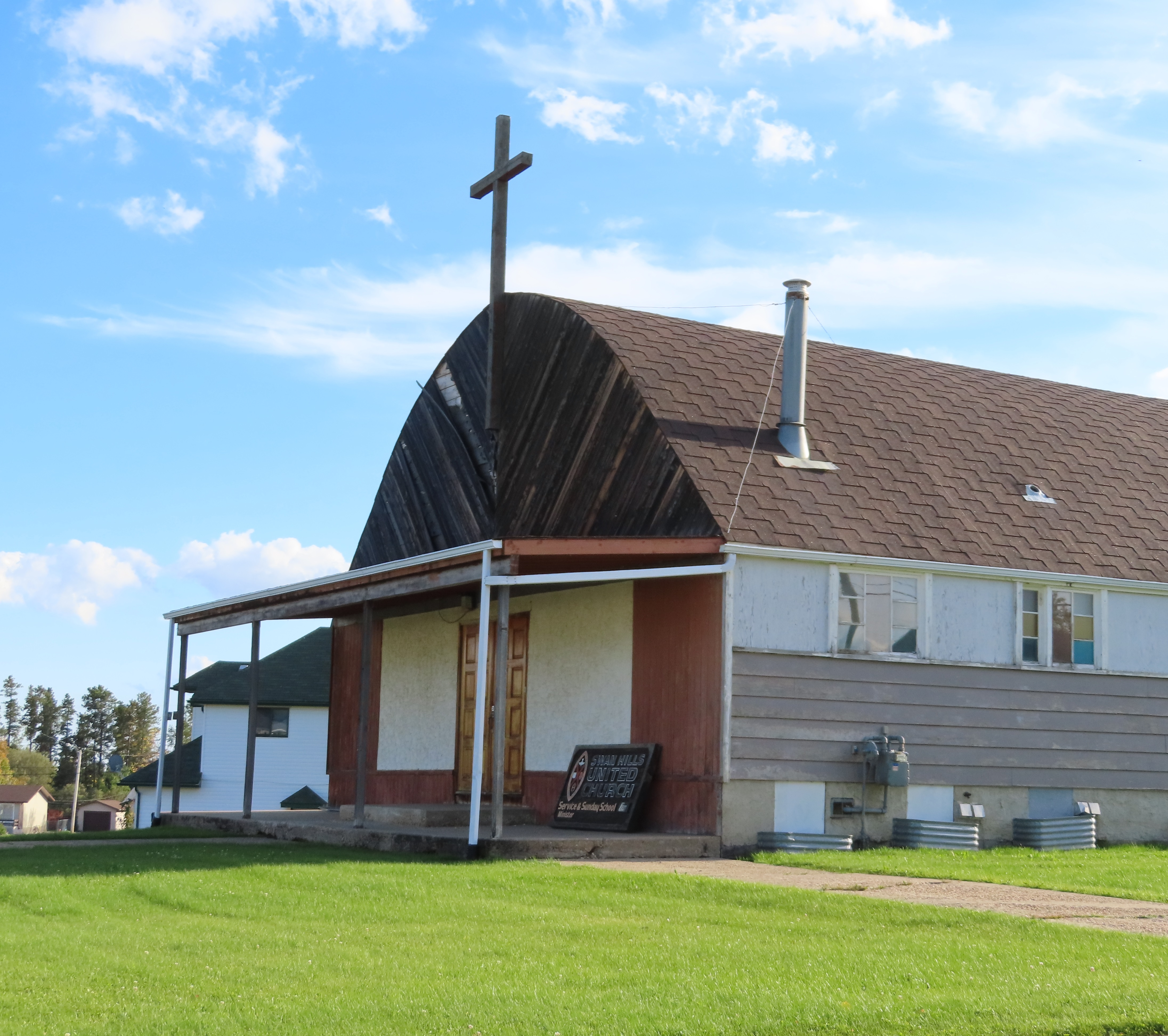
United Church in quonset hut

Swan Hills' wilderness setting makes it a popular year-round destination for nature enthusiasts and outdoor sports including camping, hunting, fishing, trapping and ATV riding.

Annual Events

- Snowmobiling: Swan Hills is one of the three points of The Golden Triangle, a groomed 350 kilometres (220 mi) snowmobile trail. A large number of people visit town for the annual Swan Hills Snow Goers snowmobile rally.
- Motocross: The Swan Hills Dirt riders host an annual motocross meet.
- Target Shooting: Swan Hills Outdoor Recreation Club hosts an annual skeet-shooting competition at the gun range
- Golfing: The 9-hole Swan Hills Golf and Country Club, 6 kilometres (3.7 mi) south of town is open from mid-April to mid-October, depending on snowfall and hosts several annual tournaments.
- Curling: In the winter there are several annual bonspiels hosted by the Swan Hills Curling Cub.
- Hockey: In the winter there are several tournaments hosted by Swan Hills Minor Hockey.

== Education ==
Kindergarten to Grade 12 students are served by Swan Hills School , in the Pembina Hills Public Schools district.

== Health Services ==
Emergency and other medical services are provided at the Swan Hills Healthcare Centre. Family and community social programs and services are available through FCSS (Family & Community Support Services) 780-333-4119

== Government ==
Local affairs in Swan Hills are managed by a mayor and town council under Alberta Municipal Affairs. Swan Hills is located in the provincial riding of Barrhead-Morinville-Westlock. Federally, the town is in the constituency of Peace River-Westlock.

== Notable people ==
- Evan Williams, actor and musician
- Leland Irving, professional hockey player

== Nearby ==
- Goose Mountain Ecological Reserve
- E.S. Huestis Demonstration Forest
- Trapper Lea's Cabin
- Centre of Alberta Natural Area
- Swan Hills Airport

== See also ==
- List of communities in Alberta
- List of towns in Alberta
