= Vega, Alberta =

Settlement in Alberta, Canada

Coordinates: 54°24′00″N 114°22′40″W

Location of Vega, Alberta

Vega is an unincorporated community in central Alberta within the County of Barrhead No. 11. It is located on Highway 661 approximately 31 kilometres (19 mi) north of Barrhead and 112 kilometres (70 mi) northwest of Edmonton.
