= Thunder Lake Provincial Park =

Provincial park in Alberta, Canada

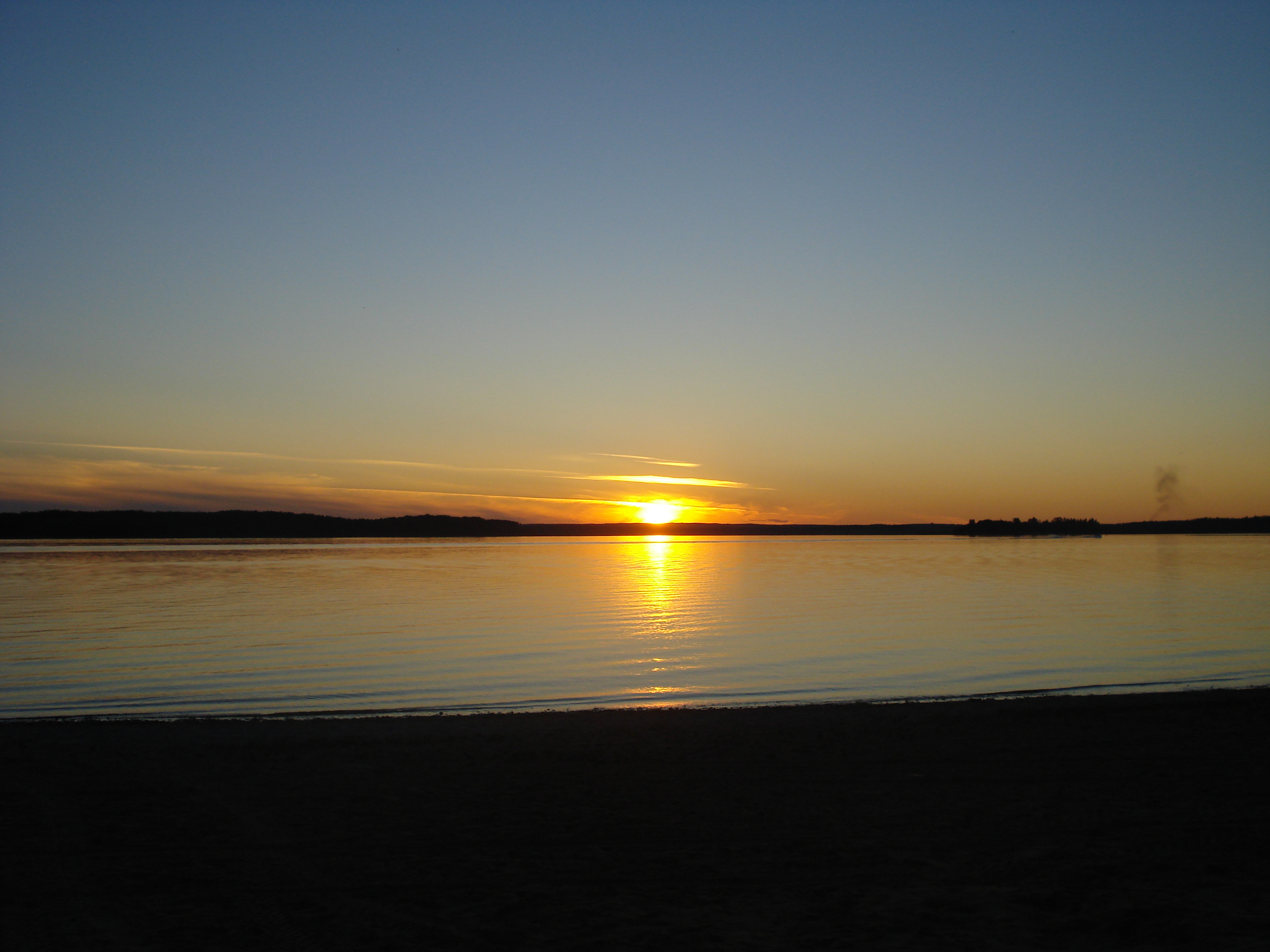
- Sunset at Thunder Lake

- Location within Alberta
- Interactive map of Thunder Lake Provincial Park
- Location: County of Barrhead No. 11, Alberta, Canada
- Nearest city: Barrhead, Edmonton
- Coordinates: 54°07′47″N 114°43′41″W
- Area: 208 ha (510 acres)
- Established: January 28, 1958
- Governing body: Alberta Tourism, Parks and Recreation, Glowing Embers

Thunder Lake Provincial Park is a provincial park located in Alberta, Canada, and is located 140 kilometres (87 mi) west of Edmonton, on the shore of the park features setting for boating, water-skiing, swimming, running, fishing and camping. Thunder lake is approximately 21 kilometres (13 mi) West of the nearest town, Barrhead.

The park is located on the north-western shore of Thunder Lake. The lake itself has a total water surface of 7.03 km^{2} (2.71 sq mi) and reaches a maximum depth of 6.1 m (20 ft). The main fish found are Northern Pike.

== See also ==
- List of provincial parks in Alberta
- List of Canadian provincial parks
- List of National Parks of Canada
