= County of Barrhead No. 11 =

Municipal district in Alberta, Canada

- Municipal district

- Location within Alberta
- Country: Canada
- Province: Alberta
- Region: Central Alberta
- Census division: 13
- Established: 1955
- Incorporated: 1959 (County)

Government
  - Reeve: Erik Munck
  - Governing body: County of Barrhead Council
  - Administrative office: Barrhead

Area (2021)
  - Land: 2,385.28 km^{2} (920.96 sq mi)

Population (2021)
  - Total: 5,877
  - Density: 2.5/km^{2} (6.5/sq mi)
- Time zone: UTC−06:00 (Alberta Time)
- Website: Official website

The County of Barrhead No. 11 is a municipal district in north central Alberta, Canada. It is located northwest of Edmonton and is in Census Division No. 13.

== Geography ==
=== Communities and localities ===
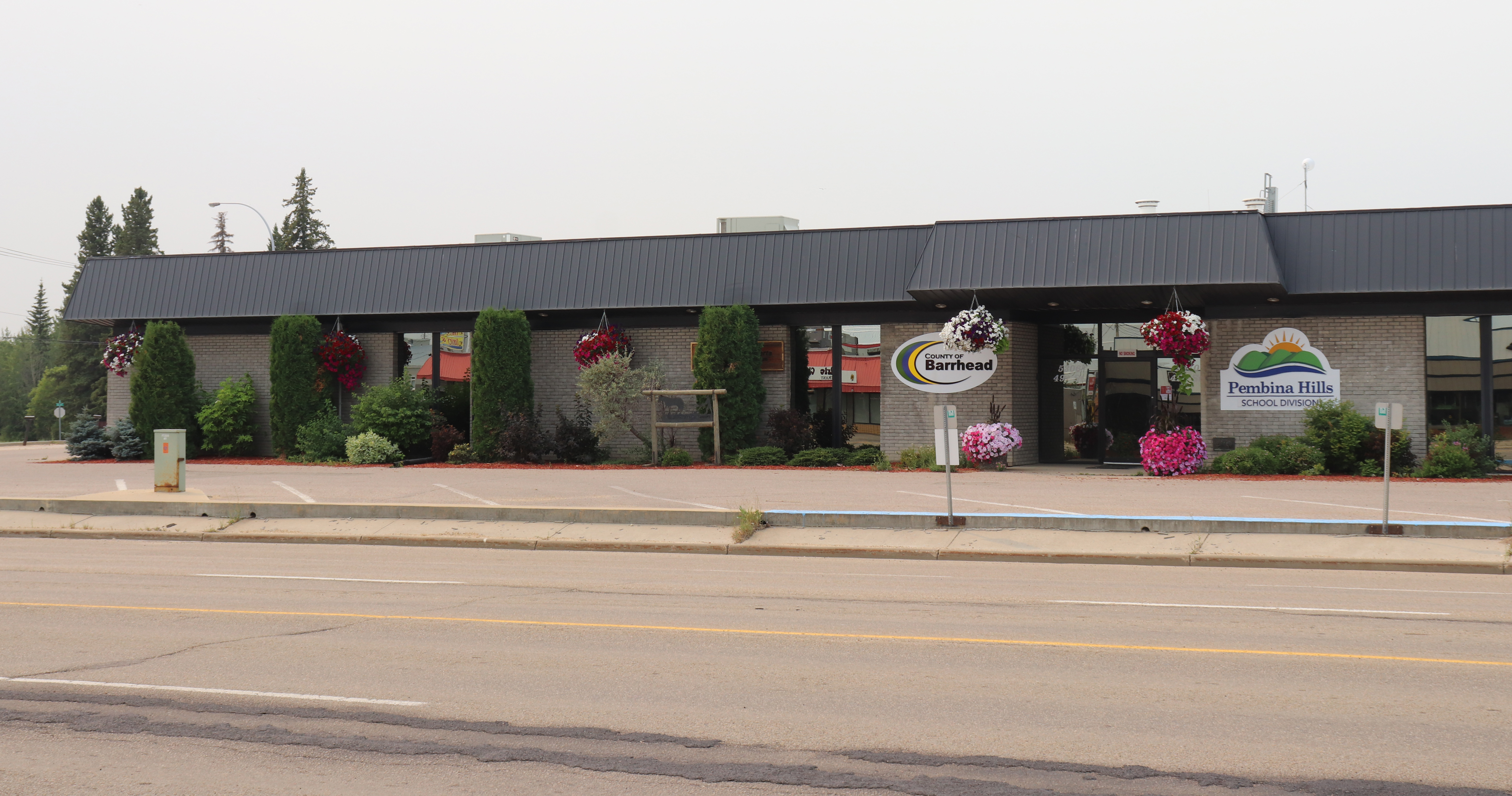
County of Barrhead office in Barrhead, Alberta

The following urban municipalities are surrounded by the County of Barrhead No. 11.

Cities

- none

Towns

- Barrhead

Villages

- none

Summer villages

- none

The following hamlets are located within the County of Barrhead No. 11.

Hamlets

- Campsie
- Manola
- Neerlandia
- Thunder Lake

The following localities are located within the County of Barrhead No. 11.

Localities

- Belvedere
- Bloomsbury
- Cam-Bar Estates
- Camp Creek
- Campsie Cove
- Dunstable
- Düsseldorf
- Freedom
- Gardenview
- Greendale Subdivision
- Highridge
- Holmes Crossing
- Idle Hours
- Lawton
- Lightning Bay
- Lunnford

- Mahar Subdivision
- Meadowview
- Mellowdale
- Moonlight Bay Estates
- Moose Wallow
- Mosside
- Mystery Lake
- Naples
- Park La Nonne
- Roselea
- Sion
- Stewartfield
- Summerlea
- Tiger Lily
- Vega

== Demographics ==
In the 2021 Census of Population conducted by Statistics Canada, the County of Barrhead No. 11 had a population of 5,877 living in 2,199 of its 2,677 total private dwellings, a change of −6.5% from its 2016 population of 6,288. With a land area of 2,385.28 km^{2} (920.96 sq mi), it had a population density of 2.5/km^{2} (6.4/sq mi) in 2021.

In the 2016 Census of Population conducted by Statistics Canada, the County of Barrhead No. 11 had a population of 6,288 living in 2,298 of its 2,830 total private dwellings, a 3.1% change from its 2011 population of 6,096. With a land area of 2,406.25 km^{2} (929.06 sq mi), it had a population density of 2.6/km^{2} (6.8/sq mi) in 2016.

Visible minority and Aboriginal population (Canada 2006 Census)
Population group		Population	% of total population
White		5,520	94.4%
Visible minority group Source:	South Asian	0	0%
Visible minority group Source:	Chinese	0	0%
Visible minority group Source:	Black	0	0%
Visible minority group Source:	Filipino	0	0%
Visible minority group Source:	Latin American	0	0%
Visible minority group Source:	Arab	0	0%
Visible minority group Source:	Southeast Asian	0	0%
Visible minority group Source:	West Asian	0	0%
Visible minority group Source:	Korean	0	0%
Visible minority group Source:	Japanese	0	0%
Visible minority group Source:	Visible minority, n.i.e.	0	0%
Visible minority group Source:	Multiple visible minority	0	0%
Total visible minority population		10	0.2%
Aboriginal group Source:	First Nations	55	0.9%
Aboriginal group Source:	Métis	240	4.1%
Aboriginal group Source:	Inuit	0	0%
Aboriginal group Source:	Aboriginal, n.i.e.	15	0.3%
Aboriginal group Source:	Multiple Aboriginal identity	0	0%
Total Aboriginal population		315	5.4%
Total population		5,845	100%

== Attractions ==
- Parks: Thunder Lake Provincial Park, Holmes Crossing Recreation Area, Klondike Ferry Park
- Dolberg Lake Campground, Homesteaders Walking Trail
- Lakes: Clear Lake, Lac la Nonne / Elks Beach, Peanut Lake
- Sport Venues in Barrhead: Swimming Pool, Curling Rink, Rodeo Grounds, Tennis Courts
  - Ice hockey: Barrhead Agrena
  - Golf: Barrhead Golf Course, Paddle River Golf Course
  - Off-Road Riding: Barry’s Ultra Motorsports Park (BUMP)
  - Bowling: Blue Heron Bowl
- Ski: Misty Ridge Ski Hill

== Education ==
The county is within the Pembina Hills Public Schools, which formed in 1995 as a merger of three school districts.

== See also ==
- List of communities in Alberta
- List of municipal districts in Alberta
