= Woodlands County =

Municipal district in Alberta, Canada

- Municipal district
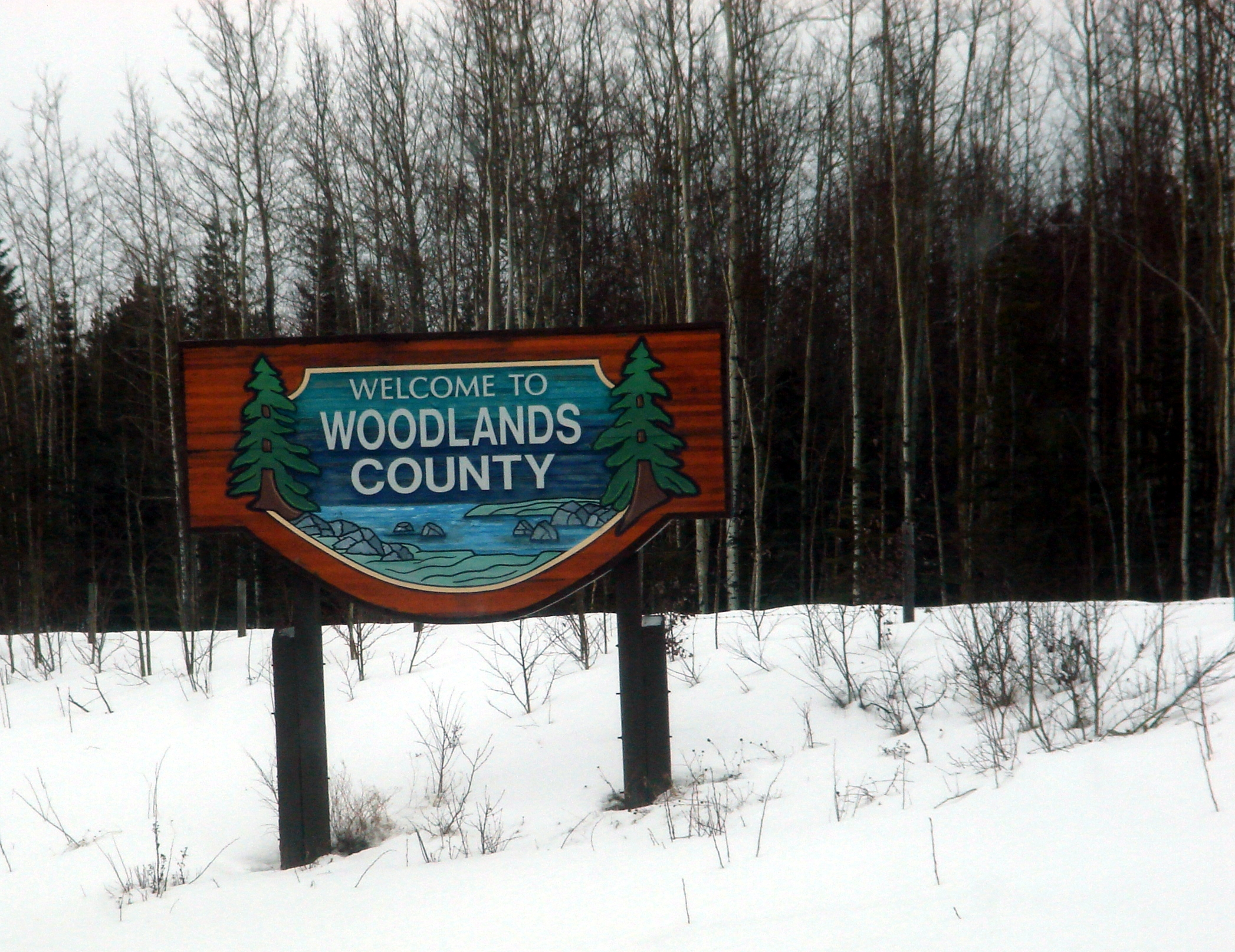
- Welcome sign

- Location within Alberta
- Coordinates: 54°08′34″N 115°41′7″W
- Country: Canada
- Province: Alberta
- Region: Central Alberta
- Census division: 13
- Established: 1994
- Incorporated: 1999 (County)

Government
  - Mayor: Dave Kusch
  - County Council: Woodlands County Council: Karen St. Martin Patricia MacNeil Peter Kuelken Alan Deane Jenna Wright Benny Whitten
  - Administrative office: adjacent to Whitecourt

Area (2021)
  - Land: 7,599.52 km^{2} (2,934.19 sq mi)

Population (2021)
  - Total: 4,558
  - Density: 0.6/km^{2} (1.6/sq mi)
- Time zone: UTC−06:00 (Alberta Time)
- Website: woodlands.ab.ca

Woodlands County is a municipal district in north-central Alberta, Canada. Located in Census Division No. 13, its municipal office is located outside but adjacent to the Town of Whitecourt. A second municipal office is located in the Hamlet of Fort Assiniboine.

== Geography ==
=== Communities and localities ===
The following urban municipalities are surrounded by Woodlands County.

Cities

- none

Towns

- Whitecourt

Villages

- none

Summer villages

- none

The following hamlets are located within Woodlands County.

Hamlets

- Blue Ridge
- Fort Assiniboine
- Goose Lake

The following localities are located within Woodlands County.

Localities

- Anselmo
- Benbow
- Corbett Creek
- Doris
- Freeman River
- Highway
- Hurdy
- Knight

- Lombell
- Lone Pine
- Lonira
- Silver Creek
- Timeu
- Topland
- Windfall

== Demographics ==
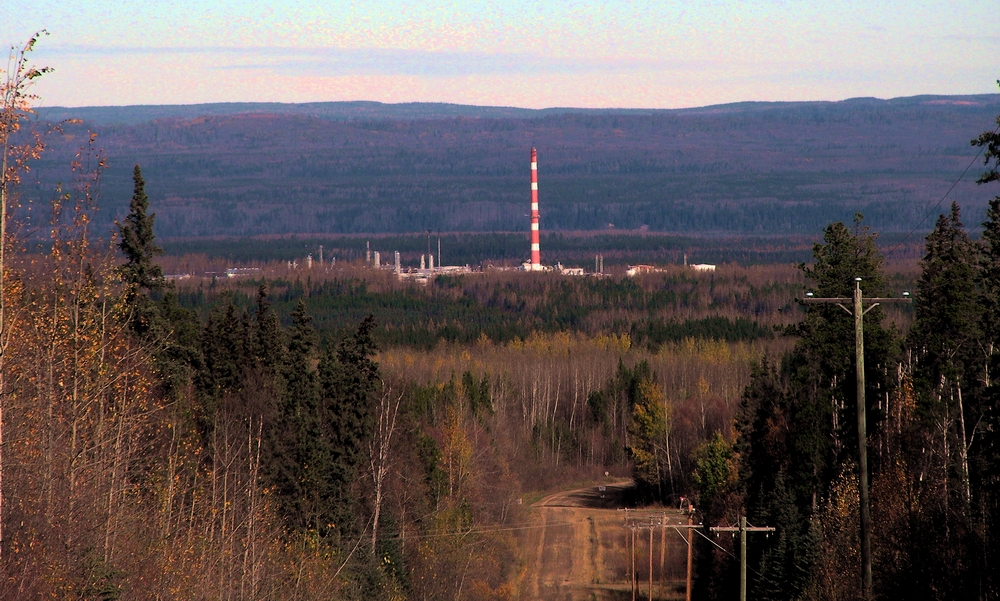
Windfall gas plant in Woodlands County

In the 2021 Census of Population conducted by Statistics Canada, Woodlands County had a population of 4,558 living in 1,739 of its 1,991 total private dwellings, a change of −3.9% from its 2016 population of 4,744. With a land area of 7,599.52 km^{2} (2,934.19 sq mi), it had a population density of 0.6/km^{2} (1.6/sq mi) in 2021.

In the 2016 Census of Population conducted by Statistics Canada, Woodlands County had a population of 4,754 living in 1,812 of its 1,950 total private dwellings, a 10.4% change from its 2011 population of 4,306. With a land area of 7,669.13 km^{2} (2,961.07 sq mi), it had a population density of 0.6/km^{2} (1.6/sq mi) in 2016.

== Education ==
The county is within the Pembina Hills Public Schools, which formed in 1995 as a merger of three school districts.

== See also ==
- List of communities in Alberta
- List of municipal districts in Alberta
