= Upper Athabasca Region =

- Land-use framework region
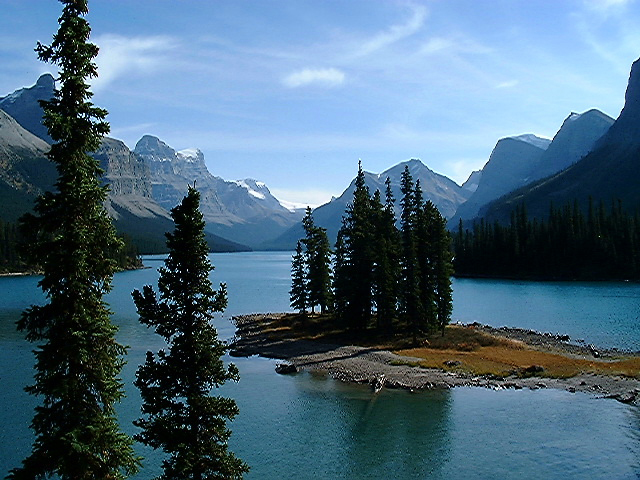
- Jasper National Park

- Location in Alberta
- Largest population centres: Whitecourt; Hinton; Edson; Slave Lake

Government
  - Parent authority: Alberta Environment and Parks

Area
  - Total: 83,004 km^{2} (32,048 sq mi)

Population (2016)
  - Total: 122,806
  - Density: 1.4795/km^{2} (3.8319/sq mi)

The Upper Athabasca Region is a land-use framework region in northern Alberta, Canada. One of seven in the province, each is intended to develop and implement a regional plan, complementing the planning efforts of member municipalities in order to coordinate future growth. Corresponding roughly to major watersheds while following municipal boundaries, these regions are managed by Alberta Environment and Parks.

== Communities ==
The following municipalities are contained in the Upper Athabasca Region.

Towns

- Athabasca
- Barrhead
- Edson
- High Prairie
- Hinton
- Mayerthorpe
- Onoway
- Slave Lake
- Swan Hills
- Westlock
- Whitecourt

Villages

- Alberta Beach
- Boyle
- Clyde

Summer villages

- Birch Cove
- Bondiss
- Castle Island
- Island Lake
- Island Lake South
- Larkspur
- Mewatha Beach
- Nakamun Park
- Ross Haven
- Sandy Beach
- Silver Sands
- South Baptiste
- South View
- Sunrise Beach
- Sunset Beach
- Sunset Point
- Val Quentin
- West Baptiste
- West Cove
- Whispering Hills
- Yellowstone

Métis settlements

- East Prairie
- Peavine
- Gift Lake

Municipal districts

- Athabasca County
- County of Barrhead No. 11
- Big Lakes County
- Lac Ste. Anne County
- Municipal District of Lesser Slave River No. 124
- Westlock County
- Woodlands County
- Yellowhead County

Specialized municipalities

- Jasper

Improvement districts

- Improvement District No. 12

Indian reserves

- Alexis 133
- Alexis Cardinal River 234
- Alexis Elk River 233
- Alexis Whitecourt 232
- Assineau River 150F
- Driftpile River 150
- Kapawe'no 150B
- Kapawe'no 150C
- Kapawe'no 150D
- Kapawe'no 229
- Kapawe'no 230
- Kapawe'no 231
- Sawridge 150G
- Sawridge 150H
- Enoch Cree Nation 135A
- Sucker Creek 150A
- Swan River 150E
