= Lac Ste. Anne County =

Municipal district in Alberta, Canada

Coordinates: 53°53′42″N 114°53′27″W

- Municipal district
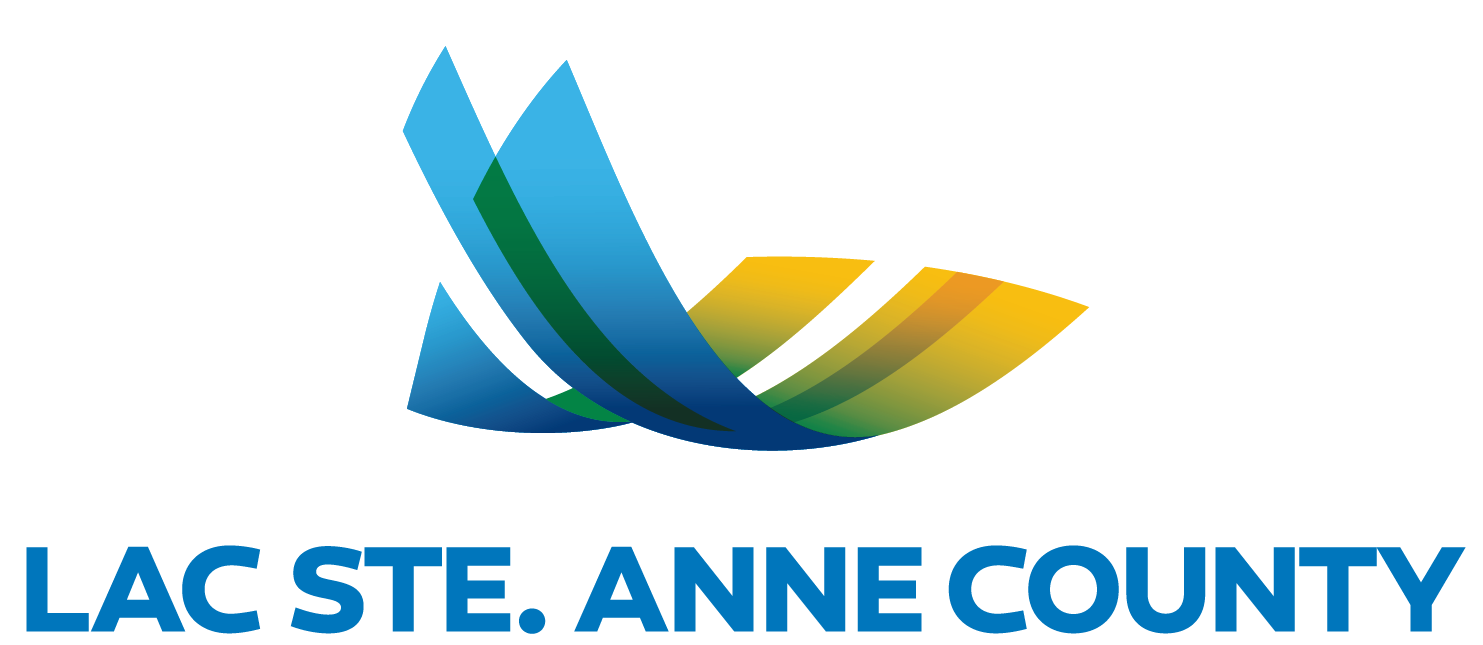
- Logo

- Major communities

- Location within Alberta
- Country: Canada
- Province: Alberta
- Region: Central Alberta
- Planning region: Upper Athabasca
- Established: 1944
- Incorporated: 1965

Government
  - Reeve: Jurgen Preugschas
  - Governing body: Lac Ste. Anne County Council Jurgen Preugschas; Dale Johnson; Barry Voltner; Mike Derksen; Ed Gifford; Bo Knysh Jill Stoney
  - Chief Administrative Officer: Ann Mitchell
  - Administrative office: Sangudo

Area (2021)
  - Land: 2,845.84 km^{2} (1,098.78 sq mi)

Population (2021)
  - Total: 11,300
- Time zone: UTC−06:00 (Alberta Time)
- Website: lsac.ca

Lac Ste. Anne County is a municipal district in central Alberta, Canada.

It is located in Census Division 13, north west of Edmonton. Highway 43 stretches across this county. Its municipal office is located in the Hamlet of Sangudo.

The county was named after Lac Ste. Anne, which in turn was named for Saint Anne.

== Geography ==
=== Communities and localities ===
The following urban municipalities are surrounded by Lac Ste. Anne County.

- Cities
  - none
- Towns
  - Mayerthorpe
  - Onoway
- Villages
  - Alberta Beach
- Summer villages
  - Birch Cove
  - Castle Island
  - Nakamun Park
  - Ross Haven
  - Silver Sands
  - South View
  - Sunrise Beach
  - Sunset Point
  - Val Quentin
  - West Cove
  - Yellowstone

The following hamlets are located within Lac Ste. Anne County.

- Hamlets
  - Cherhill
  - Darwell
  - Glenevis
  - Green Court
  - Gunn
  - Rich Valley
  - Rochfort Bridge
  - Sangudo (location of municipal office)

The following localities are located within Lac Ste. Anne County.

Localities

- Ardea Park
- Arndt Acres
- Aspen Hills
- Ballantine
- Balm
- Bay Bridge Park
- Bilby
- Birchwood Estates
- Cheviot Hills
- Cheyenne Estates
- Connor Creek
- Corsair Cove Subdivision
- Cosmo
- Darbyson Estates
- Darwell Rolling Woods
- Fern Valley Trailer Park
- Forest West
- Glenford
- Glenister
- Golden Glen Estates
- Hansen-Mayer

- Heatherdown
- Heldar
- Highland Park Subdivision
- Hillview Estates
- Hoffman Beach
- Home Acres
- Horne Beach
- Jalna
- Johnston Park
- Jones Beach
- Lac la Nonne
- Lac Ste. Anne
- Lac Ste. Anne Settlement
- Lake Isle
- Lake Majeau
- Lakewood Estates
- Laurentian Heights
- Lisburn
- Louden Park
- Manly
- Mayfair Park

- Mission Creek Estates
- Nakamun
- Noyes Crossing
- Noyes Crossing Estates
- Padstow
- Paradise Estates
- Peavine
- Pembridge
- Robinson
- Ronan
- Roydale
- Spruce Lane
- Stanger
- Ste Anne
- Stettin
- Tri Lakes Manor
- Valhalla Acres
- Warawa Estates
- Woodland Bay

== Demographics ==
In the 2021 Census of Population conducted by Statistics Canada, Lac Ste. Anne County had a population of 11,300 living in 4,547 of its 5,788 total private dwellings, a change of 3.7% from its 2016 population of 10,899. With a land area of 2,845.84 km^{2} (1,098.78 sq mi), it had a population density of 4.0/km^{2} (10.3/sq mi) in 2021.

In the 2016 Census of Population conducted by Statistics Canada, Lac Ste. Anne County had a population of 10,899 living in 4,346 of its 5,385 total private dwellings, a 6.2% change from its 2011 population of 10,260. With a land area of 2,850.38 km^{2} (1,100.54 sq mi), it had a population density of 3.8/km^{2} (9.9/sq mi) in 2016.

== Attractions ==
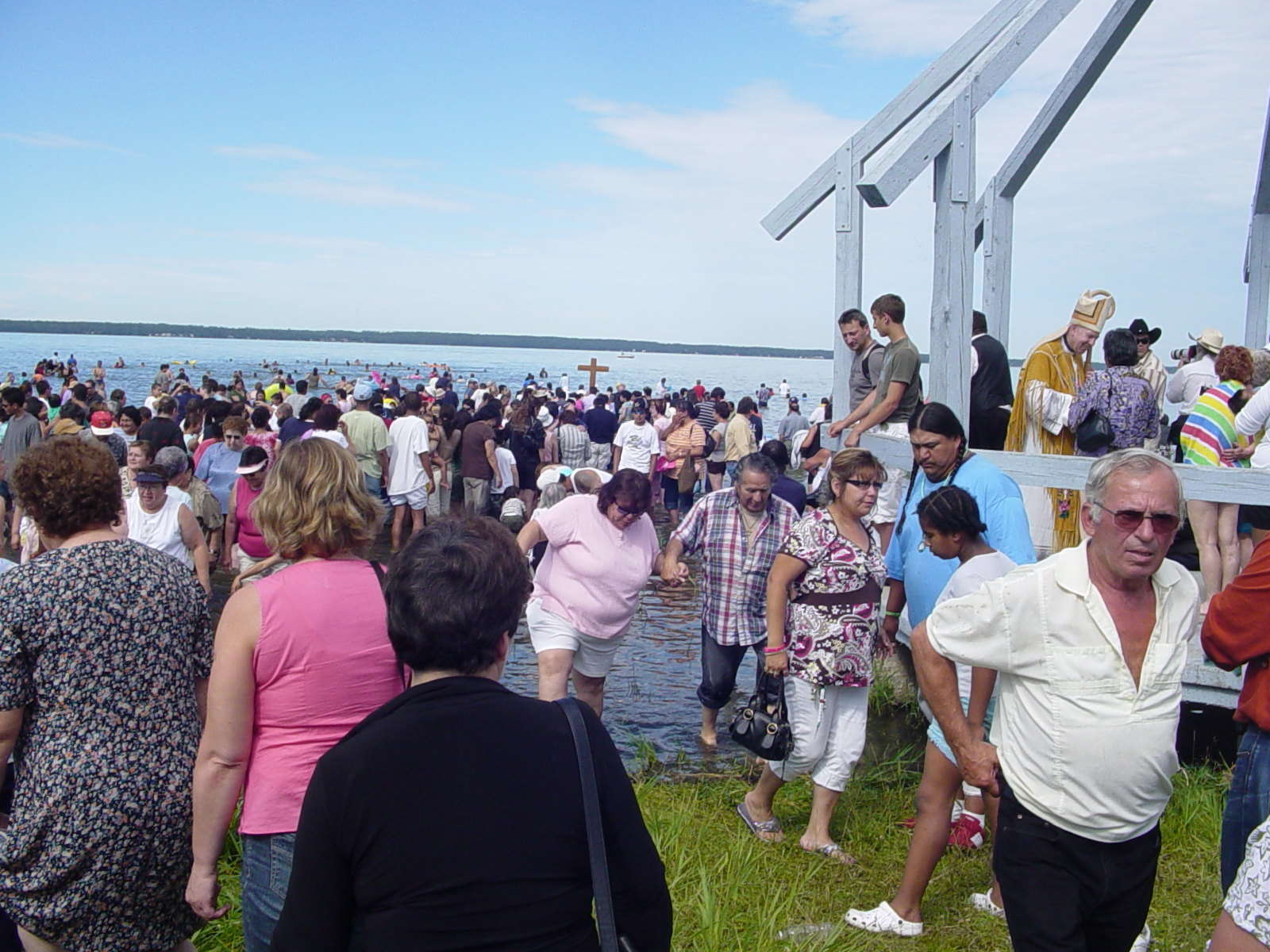
Lac Ste. Anne Pilgrimage

The municipality of Lac Ste. Anne maintains the Lessard Lake Campground, the Lessard Lake Outdoor Ed Centre, the Riverside Campground, and the Paddle River Dam Campground.

Many summer villages are established, especially on lake shores (such as Lac Ste. Anne, Lac la Nonne, Nakamun Lake, and Lake Isle).

Protected and recreational areas in the county include Lily Lake Provincial Natural Area, Pembina River Provincial Natural Area, Majeau Lake Provincial Natural Area (with two campgrounds), Paddle River Dam Picnic Site, Park Court Provincial Natural Area, Lily Lake Provincial Natural Area and Prefontaine and Brock Lake Provincial Natural Area.

- Lac Ste. Anne Mission
- Lac Ste. Anne Pilgrimage

== See also ==
- List of communities in Alberta
- List of municipal districts in Alberta
