= Central Alberta =

Region in the province of Alberta, Canada

Coordinates: 52°N 113°W

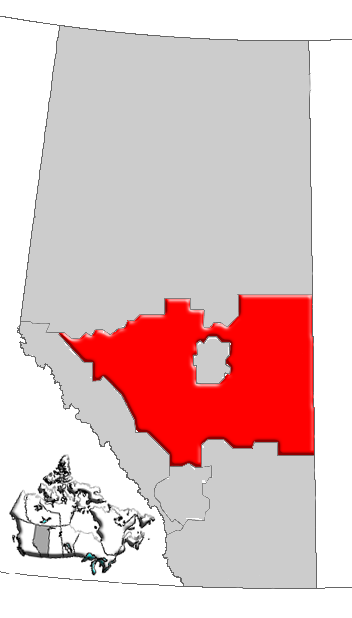

Central Alberta is a region located in the Canadian province of Alberta.

Central Alberta is the most densely populated rural area in the province. Agriculture and energy are important to the area's economy.

== Geography ==
Central Alberta is bordered by the Canadian Rockies in the west, Southern Alberta and the Calgary Region to the south, Saskatchewan to the east and Northern Alberta to the north. It completely surrounds the Edmonton Capital Region and contains the central part of the heavily populated Calgary-Edmonton Corridor.

The North Saskatchewan River crosses the region from west to east. Other rivers traversing the area are Red Deer River, Battle River, Athabasca River, Pembina River, Brazeau River, Beaver River.

Tourist attractions in the region include Alberta Prairie Railway Excursions, the Canadian Petroleum Discovery Centre in Leduc, Discovery Wildlife Park, Kerry Wood Nature Centre and Gaetz Lake Sanctuary in Red Deer, Nordegg Heritage Centre and Mine Site, Reynolds-Alberta Museum, Rocky Mountain House National Historic Site, Ukrainian Cultural Heritage Village and Stephannson House Provincial Historic Site near Sylvan Lake.

Major national, provincial, and municipal parks include Elk Island National Park, William A. Switzer Provincial Park, Dry Island Buffalo Jump Provincial Park, Big Knife Provincial Park, Pigeon Lake Provincial Park, and Sylvan Lake Park.

A series of roadside attractions known as the Giants of the Prairies can be found in Central Alberta. Large mushrooms in Vilna, huge pumpkins in Smoky Lake, giant Perogy (Ukrainian dumpling) in Glendon, huge Kielbasa (Ukrainian garlic sausage) in Mundare, large Pysanka (Ukrainian easter egg) in Vegreville, a UFO Landing Pad in St. Paul, and a giant mallard duck in Andrew.

== Demographics ==
Central Alberta has a population of 240,368 (2004).

Sector	Labour force	% of total
Agriculture	16,530	12.83%
Mining	9,690	7.52%
Manufacturing	8,610	6.68%
Construction	11,340	8.80%
Transportation and utilities	5,945	4.61%
Retail and wholesale	19,150	14.87%
Finance	4,830	3.75%
Business and community services	48,360	37.54%
Public administration	4,340	3.37%
Total	128,825	100.00%

== Infrastructure ==
=== Transportation ===
Queen Elizabeth II Highway crosses the region from south to north and the Yellowhead Highway from east to west. Other major highways include Highway 9, Highway 21, Veteran Memorial Highway, David Thomson Highway, Cowboy Trail, Grizzly Trail and Buffalo Trail. Poundmaker Trail runs through the north-east of the region.

=== Health care ===
Health care in the region is overseen by Alberta Health Services. It was formerly served by Aspen Regional Health Authority, David Thompson Regional Health Authority and East Central Health before they were amalgamated with the other six regional health boards in 2008 to form Alberta Health Services.

=== Education ===
Post-secondary institutions in the region are Red Deer Polytechnic, Olds College, Lakeland College, Burman University and the University of Alberta Augustana Faculty (Camrose).

== Politics ==
On a provincial level, central Alberta is represented in the Legislative Assembly of Alberta by MLA's elected in the ridings of Camrose, Drayton Valley-Devon, Drumheller-Stettler, Fort Saskatchewan-Vegreville, Innisfail-Sylvan Lake, Lacombe-Ponoka, Lac Ste. Anne-Parkland, Leduc-Beaumont, Maskwacis-Wetaskiwin, Olds-Didsbury-Three Hills, Red Deer-North, Red Deer-South, Rimbey-Rocky Mountain House-Sundre, Vermilion-Lloydminster-Wainwright, and West Yellowhead.

== Communities ==
The region spreads across several census divisions: 7, 8, 9, 10, 14 and parts of divisions 11, 12 and 13.

Cities

- Camrose
- Lacombe
- Lloydminster
- Red Deer
- Wetaskiwin

Towns

- Barrhead
- Bashaw
- Bentley
- Blackfalds
- Bowden
- Carstairs
- Castor
- Coronation
- Daysland
- Didsbury
- Drayton Valley
- Eckville
- Edson
- Hanna
- Hardisty
- Hinton
- Innisfail
- Killam
- Lamont
- Mayerthorpe
- Millet
- Mundare
- Olds
- Onoway
- Penhold
- Ponoka
- Provost
- Rimbey
- Rocky Mountain House
- Sedgewick
- Smoky Lake
- Stettler
- Sundre
- Sylvan Lake
- Tofield
- Two Hills
- Vegreville
- Vermilion
- Viking
- Wainwright
- Westlock

Villages

- Alberta Beach
- Alix
- Alliance
- Amisk
- Andrew
- Bawlf
- Big Valley
- Bittern Lake
- Botha
- Breton
- Caroline
- Chauvin
- Chipman
- Clive
- Clyde
- Consort
- Cremona
- Czar
- Delburne
- Dewberry
- Donalda
- Edberg
- Edgerton
- Elnora
- Ferintosh
- Forestburg
- Gadsby
- Galahad
- Glendon
- Halkirk
- Hay Lakes
- Heisler
- Holden
- Hughenden
- Innisfree
- Irma
- Kitscoty
- Lougheed
- Mannville
- Marwayne
- Myrnam
- Paradise Valley
- Rosalind
- Ryley
- Sangudo
- Spring Lake
- Strome
- Veteran
- Vilna
- Waskatenau
- Willingdon

Summer villages

- Argentia Beach
- Birch Cove
- Birchcliff
- Burnstick Lake
- Castle Island
- Crystal Springs
- Grandview
- Gull Lake
- Half Moon Bay
- Horseshoe Bay
- Jarvis Bay
- Larkspur
- Ma-Me-O Beach
- Nakamun Park
- Norglenwold
- Norris Beach
- Parkland Beach
- Pelican Narrows
- Poplar Bay
- Rochon Sands
- Ross Haven
- Sandy Beach
- Silver Beach
- Silver Sands
- South View
- Sunbreaker Cove
- Sunrise Beach
- Sunset Point
- Val Quentin
- West Cove
- White Sands
- Yellowstone

Improvement districts

- Improvement District No. 13 (Elk Island)

Municipal districts

- Barrhead No. 11, County of
- Beaver County
- Brazeau County
- Camrose County
- Clearwater County
- Flagstaff County
- Lac Ste. Anne County
- Lacombe County
- Lamont County
- Minburn No. 27, County of
- Mountain View County
- Paintearth No. 18, County of
- Ponoka County
- Provost No. 52, M.D. of
- Red Deer County
- Smoky Lake County
- Stettler No. 6, County of
- Thorhild County
- Two Hills No. 21, County of
- Vermilion River, County of
- Wainwright No. 61, M.D. of
- Westlock County
- Wetaskiwin No. 10, County of
- Woodlands County
- Yellowhead County

Special areas

- Special Area No. 4

== See also ==
- List of regions of Canada
