= Lac Ste. Anne (Alberta) =

Lake in Alberta, Canada

- Wakamne (Stoney); Manitou Sakhahigan (Cree)
- Location within Alberta
- Location: Lac Ste. Anne County, Alberta
- Coordinates: 53°42′30″N 114°27′37″W
- Type: eutrophic
- Etymology: Saint Anne
- Primary inflows: Sturgeon River
- Primary outflows: Sturgeon River
- Catchment area: 619 km^{2} (239 sq mi)
- Basin countries: Canada
- Surface area: 54.5 km^{2} (21.0 sq mi)
- Average depth: 4.8 m (15.7 ft)
- Max. depth: 11 m (36 ft)
- Surface elevation: 730 m (2,400 ft)
- Islands: Farming Island, Horse Island, Castle Island
- Settlements: Alberta Beach, Sunset Point, Yellowstone, Ross Haven, West Cove, Lac Ste. Anne, Val Quentin

National Historic Site of Canada
- Official name: Lac Ste. Anne Pilgrimage National Historic Site of Canada
- Designated: 2004

Lac Ste. Anne is a large lake in central Alberta, Canada. It is in Lac Ste. Anne County, along Highway 43, 75 km west of Edmonton.

The lake has a total area of 54.5 km^{2}, a maximum depth of 11 m, and an average depth of 4.8 m. Lac Ste. Anne lies at an elevation of 730 m, and has a drainage area of 619 km^{2}. The eutrophic lake is formed along the Sturgeon River through which it drains into the North Saskatchewan River. Two islands are found at the western end of the lake, Farming Island and Horse Island, while the small Castle Island and tiny Rock Island lie at the eastern tip of the lake.

Along the southern area coal mines generate power and employment, and recreational businesses have flourished because of the lakes. Agriculture is still a mainstay and the area is known for some of the best oat crops in Canada.

== History ==
Lac Ste. Anne was first called Wakamne (God's Lake) by the Nakota Sioux and Manitou Sakhahigan (Lake of the Spirit) by the Cree before the arrival of the settlers.

First Nations and Métis peoples hunted buffalo and fished in the lake. Legends told of a large serpent that lived in the lake, where it created dangerous, unpredictable currents that could easily capsize a canoe. Very few people saw the serpent, but when the Hudson's Bay Company (HBC) came employees renamed the lake Devil's Lake, which was a mistaken translation of the Cree name for it. The Cree name actually means Spirit Lake, because they consider it a very sacred place.

Elders of Alexis Reserve recall their grandparents telling of how as children they would go out on the lake and peer down through the then clear water to the lake bottom in search of the monster. They would hope and fear that they might see its legendary form.

=== Lac Ste. Anne Mission ===
The village of Lac Ste. Anne is one of the first permanent Métis communities in what later became Alberta and the first Catholic mission. Lac Ste. Anne was visited by Jean-Baptiste Thibault, a Catholic priest, in 1842. Two years later in 1844 he established the Mission of Lac Ste. Anne. There were 30 Métis families living here, who had come there in the 1830s, and the church served the Métis and First Nations of the area who had converted to Catholicism. He renamed the lake Lac Ste. Anne, honouring Saint Anne. Lac Ste. Anne was in a central location with good fertile fields, tall trees for lumber, and plenty of fish and wildlife. It was also far away from the HBC politics in Fort Edmonton.

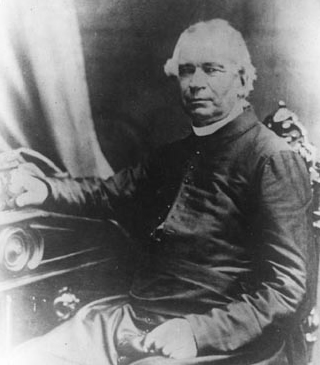
Jean-Baptiste Thibault founder of the Lac Ste. Anne Mission

The missionaries began to spread the teachings of the church, and also taught the people how to farm. The people in the area could see the buffalo was declining and the missionaries wanted to make the Métis people into farmers. By 1859 the mission boasted it had 17 fat and fine cows, 15 horses, 10 dogs, 10 cats, and a garden with flowerbeds. Pigs and sheep were not raised because of the dogs and wild predators. Crops included wheat, barley, potatoes, cabbage, onions, and turnips.

In 1859 three Grey Nuns made the journey from Montreal to the mission, where they arrived on September 24. They began their lives in Lac Ste. Anne by learning the Cree language, starting a school, helping in the gardens and painting the windows of the church so that worshippers would not be distracted during services.

The Mission grew until there were over two thousand people. An HBC post, a separate school, an orphanage retreat, a North-West Mounted Police (NWMP) barracks, a dance hall, a post office, several stores, saloons and hotels moved into the area complementing the church, rectory and convent.

At one time the mission was larger in population and commerce than Fort Edmonton.

Albert Lacombe, a Catholic priest who arrived in 1852, left Lac Ste. Anne in 1861 to build a new mission at St. Albert. When he left the mission of Lac Ste. Anne it was almost deserted by pastors and followers of the church. All that was left were a few families, the church, the rectory and the Grey Nuns' residence.

=== Lac Ste. Anne Pilgrimage ===
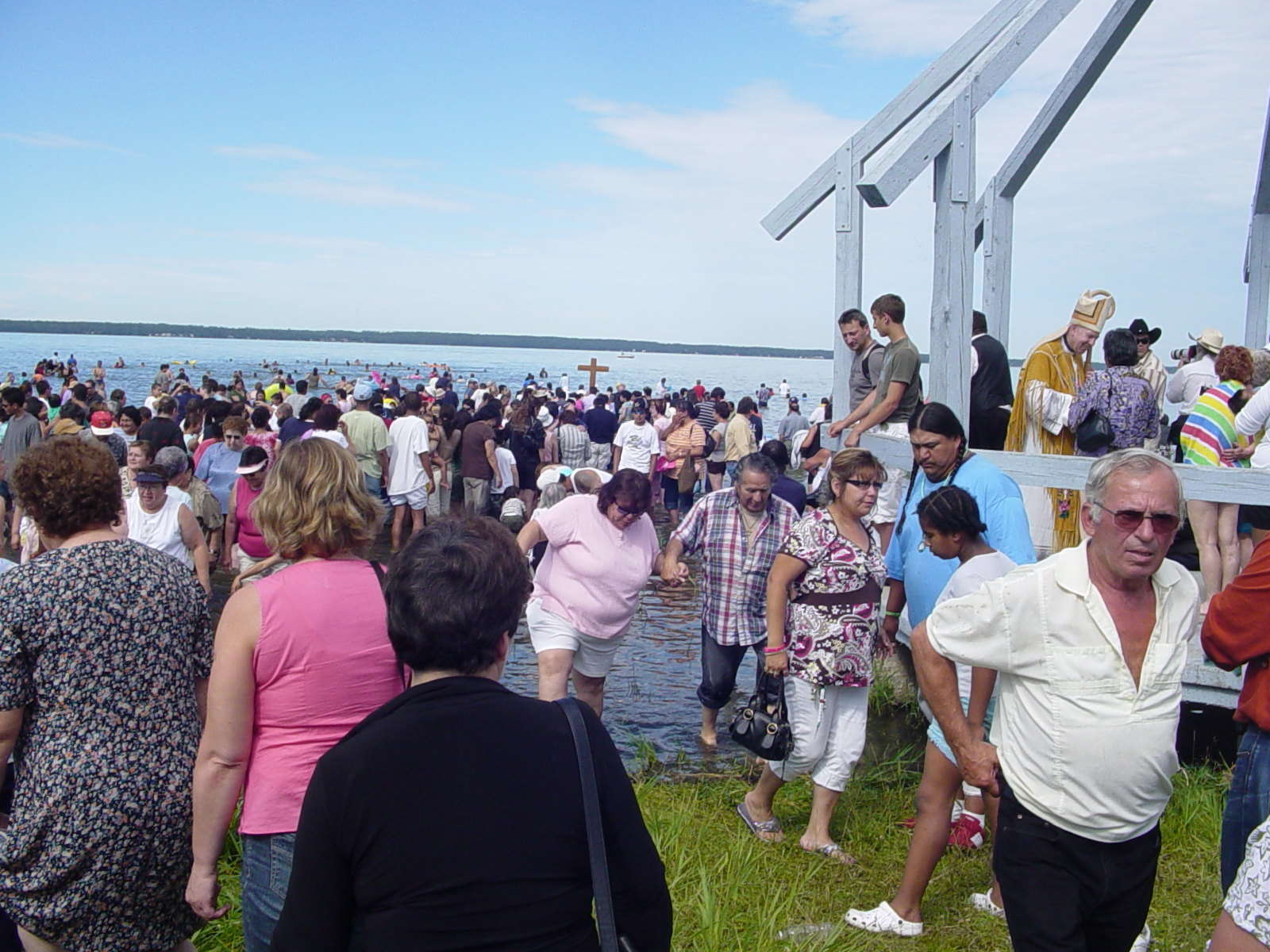
Pilgrims on Lac Ste. Anne

Joseph J. Lestanc, a priest of the Missionary Oblates of Mary Immaculate, organized the first pilgrimage to Lac Ste. Anne in 1889 in honour of Saint Anne, whose feast day is on July 26. In 1926 over 5,500 pilgrims attended. Many came by a special train from the city of Edmonton, 72 km (45 mi) away. Today pilgrims come to the lake from all over North America, many walking miles bare-footed as penance, to witness or be a part of the miracle of healing. A display of crutches and canes have been left behind in the shrine by pilgrims. Thirty to forty thousand people now attend the annual pilgrimage in the last week of July. Oaths of sobriety, along with other life-style promises are made, and prayers and forgiveness are given.

The Lac Ste. Anne Pilgrimage was declared a national historic site of Canada in 2004 for its social and cultural importance.

Lac Ste. Anne Pilgrimage is a site of national historic significance because as early as 1889, Aboriginal people, including Cree, Dene, Blackfoot and Métis, have been coming to Lac Ste. Anne to celebrate the Feast of Saint Anne. Saint Anne embodies, for many Aboriginal peoples, the traditional importance of the grandmother figure. For the Aboriginal people of Western and Northwestern Canada, the pilgrimage site is an important place of social, cultural and spiritual rejuvenation, which are important aspects of the traditional summer gathering.

— Parks Canada

On July 26, 2022, Pope Francis made a pilgrimage to Lac Ste. Anne. The pope blessed the lake's water before leading a Liturgy of the Word at the shrine of Ste. Anne, with the Catholic News Agency estimating about 10,000 people in attendance.

=== Alberta Beach ===
Several miles east, Lac Ste. Anne was the hostess of more history. In 1912 the Canadian Northern Railway (CNoR) arrived in what is now Alberta Beach, and brought its employees out for company picnics and holidays. By 1920 they had incorporated the area as a summer village, built a dance pavilion, a large wooden pier, and several cabins. Other companies such as Marshall Wells and Woodwards then began to bring their employees out for the same relaxing and beautiful atmosphere.

There was such a demand for this atmosphere that the Moonlight Express was started. The CNoR picked people up in Edmonton on Saturday mornings, took them to Alberta Beach, then picked them up Sunday night to take them back to Edmonton.

Soon people began purchasing and building their own cabins and small businesses. On January 1, 1999, the summer village of Alberta Beach became a village. It now has 884 year-round residents and can swell to over 3,000 people during long weekends. A hotel and many small businesses operate within the village.

=== Hamlet of Gunn ===
In the 1900s the Hamlet of Gunn (named after Peter Gunn) was also developing as a major trade centre, consisting mainly of Métis and First Nations. There were two flour mills, a blacksmith shop, the hotel, several stores and trading posts that nestled beside the train station. In the 1930s an army training centre was built where the Gunn housing centre now operates. Prosperity reigned until the army left and the Canadian National Railway removed its station. With it, many of the residents and businesses also left.

Today all that remains is a combination store, laundromat, restaurant, car wash and a post office, community hall and university observation and research station, as well as the Gunn Housing and Senior's Centre.

=== Castle Island ===
A French viscount, Charles de Caze, in the 1890s began building a castle on the small island on the northeast shores of Lac Ste. Anne, which he named Constance Island, in honour of his only daughter. The castle was to be four storeys high, built of stone. The walls were to be 3 feet (0.91 m) thick, and crowning it was to be a stone battlement running all the way around.

The castle was to be his retirement home but he died at the age of 44 and did not complete his project. For many years, only the two storeys of his dream castle stood.

Approximately twenty years later a Mr. Shorty purchased the island. He demolished the castle and transported several cabins to Constance Island. During prohibition it was an excellent spot for parties and fun. Years later he built a causeway which provided better access to the island. Eventually the island was sold, renamed Castle Island, subdivided, and incorporated into a summer village.

=== Darwell ===
A rail station in 1912 also created the community of Darwell, located between Lac Ste. Anne and Isle Lake. The naming of this station caused many debates with no resolution, until an enterprising man took out his hymnbook and randomly picked a good tune. The tune had the name Darwell in it.

It also became known throughout Alberta as a hobo stop because of a ranch which never turned away anyone asking for shelter. Many men out of work rode the rail to Darwell to get food and lodging in exchange for work. As the story goes many men wanted by the law also found refuge, and the NWMP made many trips to the Hobo Ranch.

Today Darwell has a store, volunteer fire department, community hall, old age home and school. The old ranch has long disappeared.

== Communities ==
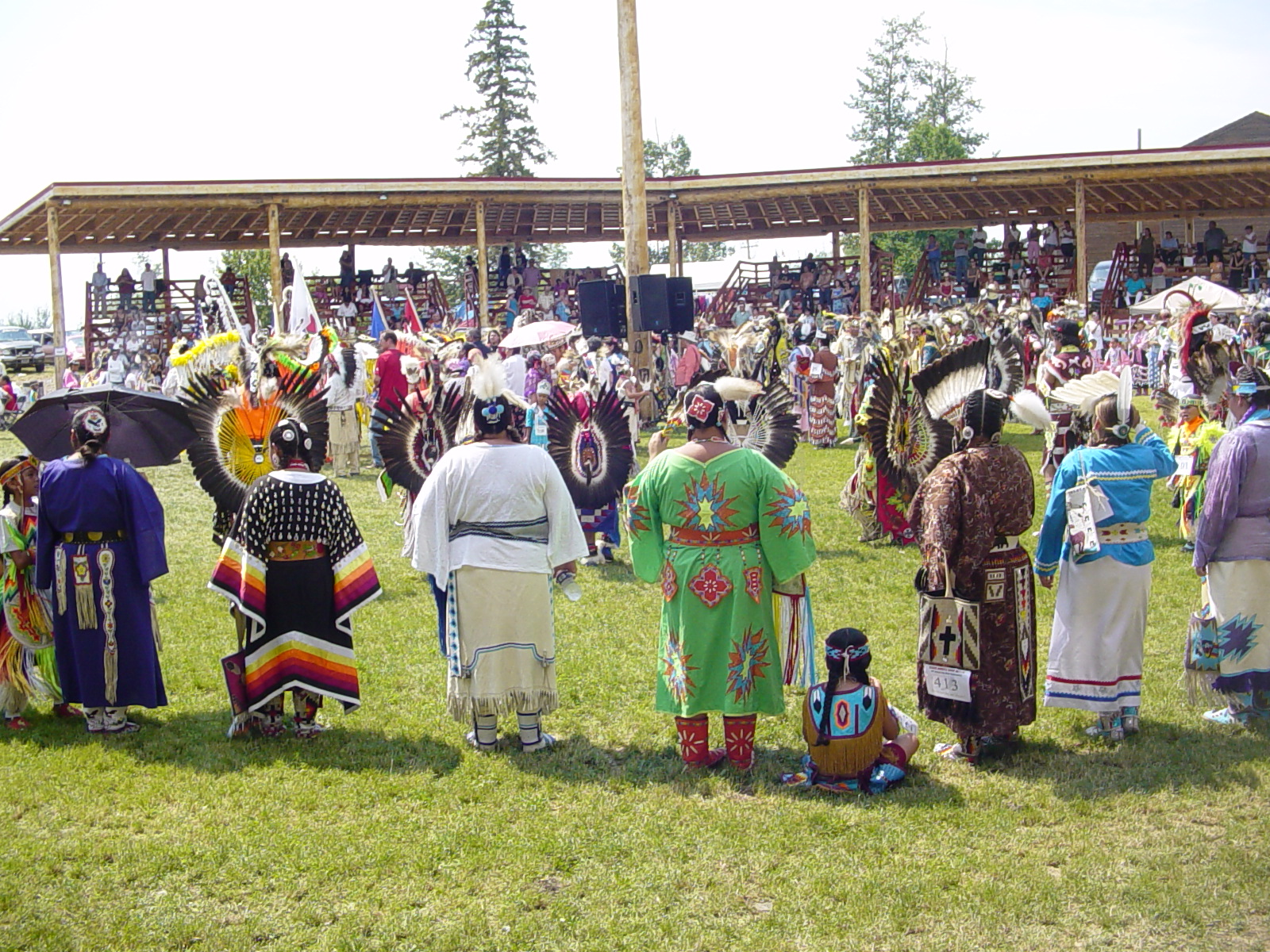
In the arbour during the grand entry, Alexis Pow-wow 2007

The Alexis Indian Reserve of the Alexis Nakota Sioux First Nation is on the northern shore of the lake, and Alberta Beach is on the southeastern shore. The summer villages of Ross Haven and Yellowstone, along with the subdivision of Corsair Cove, and the unincorporated hamlet of Gunn lie along the northern shore. The summer villages of Castle Island, Sunset Point and Val Quentin lie to either side of Alberta Beach. The summer village of West Cove lies on the southern shore of the west basin.

== Recreation ==
Two campgrounds are located around the lake, one at Alberta Beach and the other at Gunn, on the north-eastern shore. There are also two golf courses in the immediate area, one at Alberta Beach, and the other in Ross Haven. There are two Bible camps with lakefront property on Lac Ste. Anne: Ross Haven Bible Camp, in Ross Haven, and run by the Canadian Sunday School Mission, and Sunset Point Christian Camp, in Sunset Point, and run by the Alberta Pentecostal Missions Society.

Fishing is a popular recreational activity, species including whitefish, northern pike, walleye and yellow perch.

Water based sports include sailing, water skiing and windsurfing in summer and snowmobiling and cross-country skiing in winter.
