= Green Court =

- Hamlet
- Location of Green Court Green Court (Canada)
- Coordinates: 54°00′28″N 115°14′19″W
- Country: Canada
- Province: Alberta
- Region: Central Alberta
- Census division: 13
- Municipal district: Lac Ste. Anne County

Government
  - Type: Unincorporated
  - Governing body: Lac Ste. Anne County Council

Population (2008)
  - Total: 51
- Time zone: UTC−06:00 (Alberta Time)
- Area codes: 780, 587, 825

Greencourt is a hamlet in central Alberta, Canada within Lac Ste. Anne County. It is located at the intersection of Highway 43 and Highway 18, approximately 127 kilometres (79 mi) northwest of Edmonton.

The community takes its name from Greencourt, England.

== History ==
In 1908, when the railway reached Junkins, Alberta (later Wildwood) a trail was cut from Junkins to Green Court as a route for homesteaders and supplies.

== Demographics ==
The population of Green Court according to the 2008 municipal census conducted by Lac Ste. Anne County is 51.

== See also ==
- List of communities in Alberta
- List of hamlets in Alberta
