= Glenevis =

- Hamlet
- Location of Glenevis Glenevis (Canada)
- Coordinates: 53°47′23″N 114°31′01″W
- Country: Canada
- Province: Alberta
- Region: Central Alberta
- Census division: 13
- Municipal district: Lac Ste. Anne County

Government
  - Type: Unincorporated
  - Governing body: Lac Ste. Anne County Council

Population (2008)
  - Total: 49
- Time zone: UTC−06:00 (Alberta Time)
- Area codes: 780, 587, 825

Glenevis is a hamlet in central Alberta, Canada within Lac Ste. Anne County. It is located on Highway 43, approximately 71 kilometres (44 mi) northwest of Edmonton.

The community takes its name from Glennevis, in Nova Scotia.

== Climate ==
Climate data for Glenevis
Month	Jan	Feb	Mar	Apr	May	Jun	Jul	Aug	Sep	Oct	Nov	Dec	Year
Record high °C (°F)	13 (55)	13.3 (55.9)	15.5 (59.9)	29.4 (84.9)	31 (88)	31.1 (88.0)	31.5 (88.7)	32 (90)	33 (91)	30 (86)	20.5 (68.9)	12.2 (54.0)	33 (91)
Mean daily maximum °C (°F)	−7.1 (19.2)	−3.8 (25.2)	1.7 (35.1)	10.7 (51.3)	17.2 (63.0)	20.4 (68.7)	22.1 (71.8)	21.1 (70.0)	15.5 (59.9)	10.9 (51.6)	0 (32)	−6.9 (19.6)	8.5 (47.3)
Daily mean °C (°F)	−12.1 (10.2)	−9.2 (15.4)	−3.8 (25.2)	4.3 (39.7)	10.4 (50.7)	13.8 (56.8)	15.7 (60.3)	14.7 (58.5)	9.5 (49.1)	5.1 (41.2)	−4.5 (23.9)	−11.6 (11.1)	2.7 (36.9)
Mean daily minimum °C (°F)	−17 (1)	−14.5 (5.9)	−9.2 (15.4)	−2.2 (28.0)	3.5 (38.3)	7.1 (44.8)	9.3 (48.7)	8.2 (46.8)	3.5 (38.3)	−0.7 (30.7)	−8.9 (16.0)	−16.2 (2.8)	−3.1 (26.4)
Record low °C (°F)	−42.2 (−44.0)	−36.5 (−33.7)	−32.8 (−27.0)	−27.5 (−17.5)	−7 (19)	−1.1 (30.0)	0.5 (32.9)	−0.6 (30.9)	−7.8 (18.0)	−27 (−17)	−32.8 (−27.0)	−41.1 (−42.0)	−42.2 (−44.0)
Average precipitation mm (inches)	32 (1.3)	23.2 (0.91)	27.4 (1.08)	26.6 (1.05)	55.3 (2.18)	104 (4.1)	108.4 (4.27)	70.8 (2.79)	54.5 (2.15)	25 (1.0)	21.4 (0.84)	36.8 (1.45)	585.6 (23.06)
Source: Environment Canada

== Demographics ==
The population of Glenevis according to the 2008 municipal census conducted by Lac Ste. Anne County is 49.

== See also ==
- List of communities in Alberta
- List of hamlets in Alberta
