= Lac Ste. Anne, Alberta =

Locality in Alberta

Lac Ste. Anne
- Locality
- Interactive map of Lac Ste. Anne
- Coordinates: 53°41′20″N 114°25′49″W
- Country: Canada
- Province: Alberta
- Municipal district: Lac Ste. Anne County
- Time zone: UTC−7 (Mountain Time Zone)
  - Summer (DST): UTC−6 (MDT)
- Area codes: 780, 587, 825

Lac Ste. Anne is a locality in central Alberta, Canada, within Lac Ste. Anne County.

It is located on the southern shore of Lac Ste. Anne, approximately 77 kilometres (48 mi) west of Edmonton. It has an elevation of 720 metres (2,360 ft).

== See also ==
- Lac Ste. Anne Mission
- Lac Ste. Anne Pilgrimage
- List of communities in Alberta
- List of settlements in Alberta
