= Hillview Estates, Alberta =

Hillview Estates, Alberta may refer to:

- Hillview Estates, Parkland County, Alberta, a locality in Parkland County, Alberta
- Hillview Estates, Lac Ste. Anne County, Alberta, a locality in Lac Ste. Anne County, Alberta
