= Lac la Nonne =

Lake in Alberta, Canada

- Location within Alberta
- Location: County of Barrhead No. 11 / Lac Ste. Anne County, Alberta
- Coordinates: 53°56′14″N 114°19′11″W
- Type: Hyper-Eutrophic
- Primary inflows: Majeu Creek
- Primary outflows: MacDonald Creek, Pembina River
- Catchment area: 130 km^{2} (50 sq mi)
- Basin countries: Canada
- Max. length: 7 km (4.3 mi)
- Max. width: 2.5 km (1.6 mi)
- Surface area: 12.28 km^{2} (4.74 sq mi)
- Average depth: 7.8 m (26 ft)
- Max. depth: 20 m (66 ft)
- Residence time: 6.5 years
- Surface elevation: 664 m (2,178 ft)
- Settlements: Birch Cove

Lac la Nonne is a lake in central Alberta, Canada. It is located between Lac Ste. Anne County and the County of Barrhead No. 11, 85 km north-west from Edmonton, east of the Grizzly Trail.

The lake is located within the Athabasca River basin and is fed by Majeau Creek, with water levels controlled by a dam, on the outflowing MacDonald Creek which then flows into the Pembina River.

== History ==
Lac la Nonne is fairly large (11.8 km^{2}) and deep (maximum depth 19.8 m) lake located about 90 km northwest of Edmonton in the counties of Barrhead and Lac Ste. Anne. This is a highly developed and popular recreational lake. The closest large population centre is the town of Barrhead, 20 km to the north. The name of the lake was originally mi-ka-sioo, meaning "eagle" in Cree. The current name, Lac la Nonne has an uncertain origin but is believed to derive from "the nun" in French. In 1827, Edward Ermatinger recorded the lake's name in his journal as Lac La Nane or “Lac La Nan“. It has been suggested that the name comes from the white-winged scoter, a duck with features similar to ducks in England known as "the nun".

The Hudson's Bay Company established a trading post at the lake in the early 19th century; by the 1830s there were many Métis, and by the 1870s a Catholic mission had been established. In the 1890s several families had settled around the lake, and by 1912 most of the available land had been homesteaded.

The Atlas of Alberta Lakes has this to say about the history of Lac LaNonne:

The Hudson's Bay Company established a trading post at Lac la Nonne in the early 1800s. The post was used to pasture the herds of pack horses needed to portage goods from Edmonton House to Fort Assiniboine on the Athabasca River (Edm. Reg. Plan. Commis. and Alta. Mun. Aff. 1980). By the 1830s, there were considerable numbers of Métis living by the lake. Missionaries arrived in the 1870s, and in 1878, the Oblate Fathers established a mission on the southeast shore at the site of the present-day Catholic Church in Camp Encounter. When the fur trade declined, the Métis moved away and the trading post and mission were closed (Barrhead Dist. Hist. Soc. 1967). By the 1890s, several white families had settled around the lakeshore, and by 1912, most of the available land had been home-steaded. Horse and cattle raising were important occupations, and sawmills operated periodically near the lake. The first summer cottages were built on the eastern shore in the early 1900s. For many years the local recreation centre was Killdeer Beach Resort on the southwest shore. It began business in about 1928, and held activities such as "amphibious" horse races (Barrhead Dist. Hist. Soc. 1967). At present, it is one of two commercial facilities at the lake, which offer a total of 410 campsites (Alta. Hotel Assoc. 1989). As well, there is a restaurant, a gas station and three small stores in the subdivisions on the lakeshore. There are no provincial or municipal campgrounds at the lake."

In 1924, the lake began stocking smallmouth bass, in an effort to introduce sport-fishing species into Alberta lakes.

== On the York Factory Express ==
Lac la Nonne was on the York Factory Express the main overland connection between HBC headquarters at York Factory and the principal station of Columbia Department, Fort Vancouver, as recorded in the York Factory Express Journals of “1827-182S” by Edward Ermatinger's York Factory Express Journal.

“ YORK FACTORY EXPRESS JOURNAL 85 ...' Lac la Nonne or Nun lake; about 40 miles north-west of Edmonton; is now the centre of a flourishing settlement. ”

“ YORK FACTORY EXPRESS JOURNAL 103 ... 15th. — Fine weather. Proceeded this day as far as Lac La Nan/ having made one halt — 2 men sent ahead to repair the canoes at Fort Assiniboine. Picard arrives at our encampment with letters from J. R. Esq.^ ”

Source: Full text of "Proceedings and transactions of the Royal Society of Canada. Délibérations et mémoires de la Société royale du Canada"

PROCEEDINGS AND TRANSACTIONS OF THE ROYAL SOCIETY OF CANADA THIRD SERIES— VOLUME VI. MEETING OF MAY 1912

G. — Edward Ermatinger's York Factory Express Journal, Ijeing a Record of Journeys made l^etween Fort Vancouver and Hudson Bay in the year 1827-182S. Edited and annotated b} Judge A. Ermatinger. Presented by Dr. J. H. Coyne.

== Among the earliest land grants in Alberta granted at Lac la Nonne ==
Only three years after the Hudson's Bay Company assumed responsibility for Ruperts Land it started surveying for issuing special land grants at Lac la Nonne:

“ In 1881 it is estimated that only about one thousand white men considered Alberta home. However, the land was ready for settlement. The Dominion Land Survey, begun in 1871 in Manitoba and continued west through Saskatchewan, was well underway in Alberta. As early as 1873, the special land grants provided to the Hudson Bay Company as part of their deal with the government of Canada, were surveyed around posts in Edmonton, Lac La Nonne, Victoria, Rocky Mountain House, Assiniboine and over half a dozen others, amounting to some 3,000 acres.

== Connection to the Klondike Trail ==
"The overland route from Edmonton to Dawson City in the Yukon was 1,446 miles long and passed through St. Albert, Lac La Nonne (including the Sion area), Fort Assiniboine, Grouard and Peace River.

When the Edmonton Bulletin reported the Yukon gold strike in a May edition of 1897 the first 90 miles of the trail were already in place. It was a pack horse trail and was used for moving furs and other goods to and from the upper and lower Athabasca River. Main stopping places on the old Klondike Trail included Riviere Qui Barre, Sion, Lac La Nonne, and Belvedere or McDonald's Crossing.

A combination of Klondike gold seekers, the promises of the Homestead Land Act and the northward progress of land surveyors, all combined to quicken rural development along the Klondike Trail. "

== Camp Encounter ==
Currently owned by Catholic Archdiocese of Edmonton, Camp Encounter has this to say about its history at Lac La Nonne:

"Various events and people that made Canadian history contributed to our local Albertan heritage, have had strong association with this site, the lake, and the surrounding Lac la Nonne area.

Until the 1800s, the area was mainly a vast expanse of wilderness, and served as the hunting and fishing grounds for the Cree and Stoney Native peoples. Due to the importance of the Athabasca River on the early fur trade, several forts were established along the route, and Lac la Nonne became an important link between the Athabasca River and Fort Edmonton. The Hudson Bay Company established a trading post just to the north of the lake to service travelers along this trade route. Fur farms were commonly found along the route to serve the trading company. The ruins of one such farm on this site are the reminders of this early booming economy.

Early Christian Oblate missionaries visited the area and Father Abert Lacombe and Father H Leduc were among the early missionaries to frequent the area. In 1870 Father Favard, who was later killed at Frog Lake during the Riel rebellion, was appointed resident priest for the area and built a little log cabin at the site of the present church, Our Lady of Lourdes. On Easter Sunday 1878, Cree chief Katchikawesham, of the Lac la Nonne mission, was baptised and became known by his Christian name, Alexander Arcand. Earlier in 1876, he had just signed the treaty number 6 which resulted in the establishment of a new reserve, number 134, now situated along the eastern shore of the Sandy Lake.

During the 1890s the mission experienced the excitement of the Klondike Gold Rush, as would-be prospectors, lured by the call of gold in the Klondike, tracked their way through this area and were reminded of the harsh reality of the North.

A signpost on the trail not too far from this site read:

Due North - Dawson City - starvation and death

Due South - Home Sweet Home and a warm bed

...The charm and excitement of the Klondike Gold Rush through this area remains etched within the very boundaries of Camp Encounter, as a continuous section of this historic trail crosses the length of this site. Off this once beaten path, a rock outcrop overgrown with bush is the only relic of a grotto of Our Lady that once stood here and was later destroyed by lightning. "

Killdeer Beach Resort and Elksbeach Campground are the two commercial facilities at the lake. No commercial fisheries exist on the lake, although sport fishery, with the main catches being walleye and northern pike, is very popular in the summer. Killdeer Beach was established in 1928, making it one of Alberta's oldest such resorts. "In 1928 a local recreation centre was founded called Killdeer Beach Resort on the southwest shore."

The following quote is taken from GeoTourism Canada's more extensive history and descriptive page on Lac La None:

" THE LAST WORD From wilderness to the Hudson Bay Company, the Missions of the Oblate Fathers, the trail to the Klondike and one of Alberta's oldest and most popular 20th century summer resorts, Lac La Nonne has experienced a full and rich history to become one of the most settled, protected and prettiest lakes in Alberta."

Land acquisition around this lake and cottage development on the shoreline increased through to the 1970s until most of the shoreline became privately owned. Many cottages have been winterized and general lake use has intensified over the last half of the 20th century. Due to concerns about the quality of the lake, further development around the lake was halted through regulations enforced by Alberta Environment."

Sammy Majeau was the first Metis President at the Lac la Nonne Local.
