= Cherhill, Alberta =

Cherhill
- Hamlet
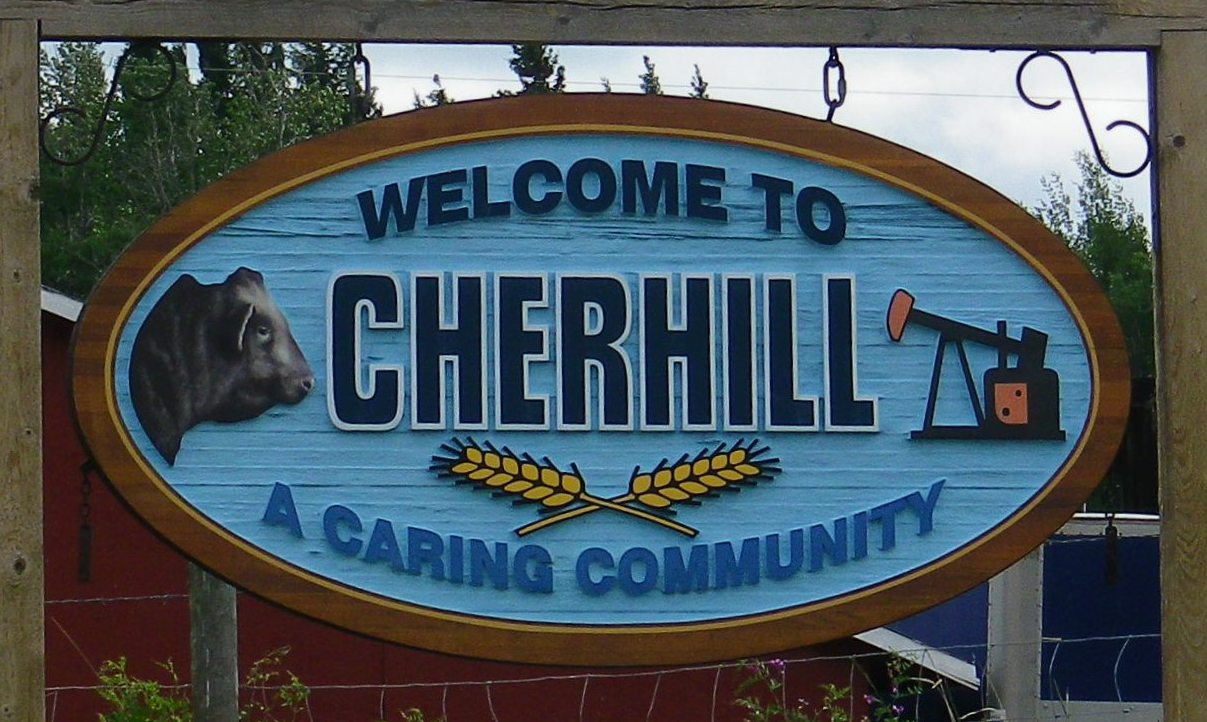
- An entrance sign of Cherhill

- Location of Cherhill in Alberta
- Coordinates: 53.8192°N 114.6772°W
- Country: Canada
- Province: Alberta
- Census division: No. 13
- Municipal district: Lac Ste. Anne County
- First post office: 1911

Government
  - Type: Unincorporated

Population (2008)
  - Total: 60
- Time zone: UTC−06:00 (Alberta Time)
- Postal code: T0E 0J0

Cherhill is a hamlet in Alberta, Canada within Lac Ste. Anne County. It is located along Highway 43, approximately 35 kilometres (22 mi) east of Mayerthorpe and 82 kilometres (51 mi) northwest of Edmonton.

The hamlet is located in census division No. 13.

The first syllable of the Cherhill's name is derived from the last syllable of the name of A. P. Stetcher, the postmaster when the post office opened in 1911, with "hill" added to it.

== Demographics ==
Population history of Cherhill
Year	Pop.	±%
1941	50	—
1951	81	+62.0%
1956	84	+3.7%
1961	72	−14.3%
1966	83	+15.3%
1971	62	−25.3%
1976	71	+14.5%
1981	79	+11.3%
1986	61	−22.8%
1991	80	+31.1%
Source: Statistics Canada

As of a 2008 census conducted by Lac Ste. Anne County, the population of Cherhill was 60.

== See also ==
- List of communities in Alberta
- List of hamlets in Alberta
- Cherhill, Wiltshire, England
