= Nakamun Lake (Alberta) =

Lake in Alberta, Canada

- Location within Alberta
- Location: Lac Ste. Anne County / County of Barrhead No. 11, Alberta
- Coordinates: 53°53′04″N 114°11′58″W
- Primary outflows: Toad Creek
- Catchment area: 44.9 km (27.9 mi)
- Basin countries: Canada
- Max. length: 2.2 km (1.4 mi)
- Max. width: 0.8 km (0.50 mi)
- Surface area: 3.54 km^{2} (1.37 sq mi)
- Average depth: 4.5 m (15 ft)
- Max. depth: 8.0 m (26.2 ft)
- Water volume: 1,500,000 m^{3} (1,200 acre⋅ft)
- Residence time: 21 years
- Shore length^{1}: 12.5 km (7.8 mi)
- Surface elevation: 683.03 m (2,240.9 ft)
- Settlements: Nakamun Park
- ^{1} Shore length is not a well-defined measure.

Nakamun Lake is a lake in Alberta. The name is derived from nikamon (Cree for 'song, song of praise').
