= Aspen Hills, Alberta =

Aspen Hills, Alberta may refer to:

- Aspen Hills, Parkland County, Alberta, a locality in Parkland County, Alberta
- Aspen Hills, Lac Ste. Anne County, Alberta, a locality in Lac Ste. Anne County, Alberta
