= Sangudo =

- Hamlet
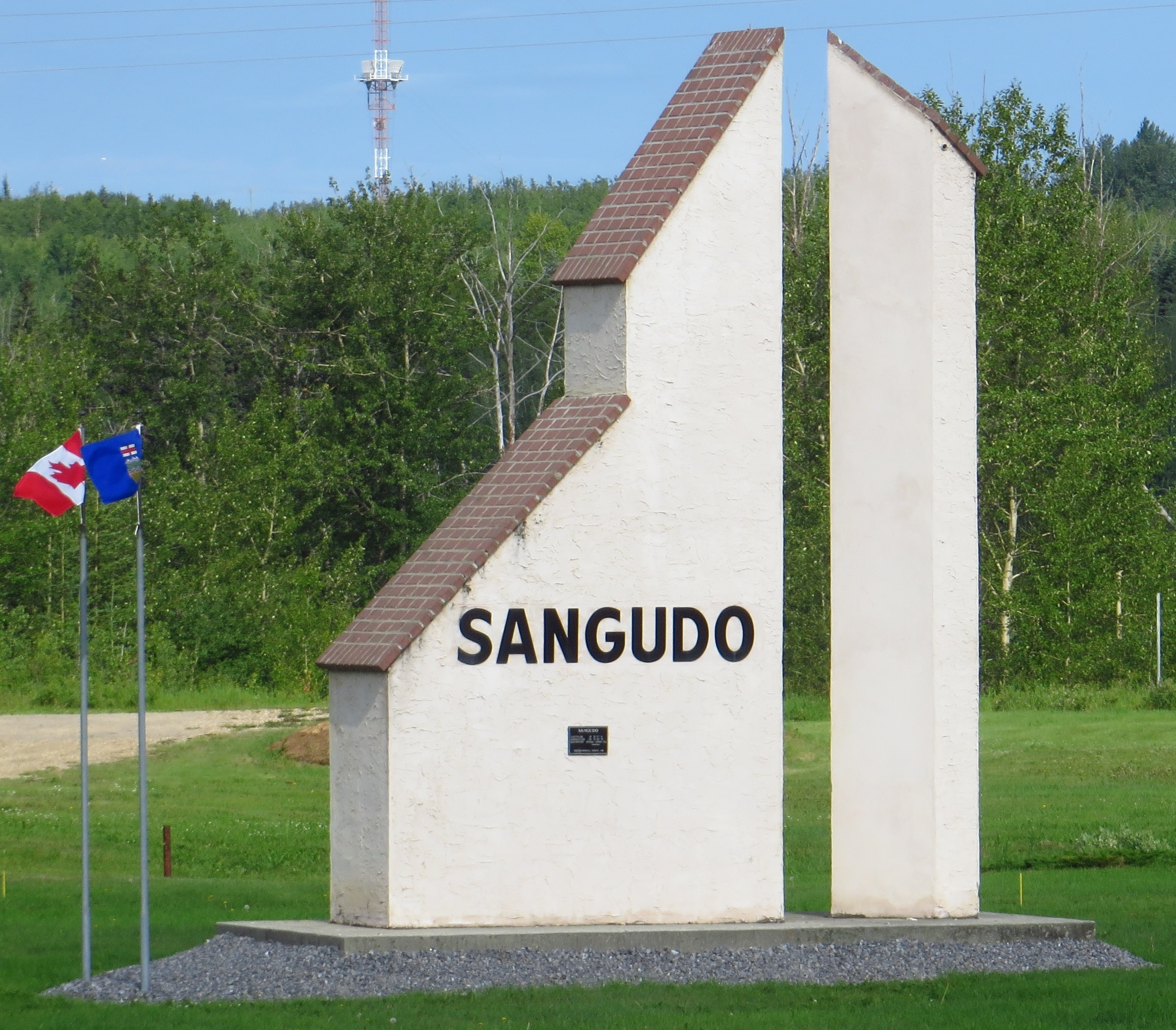
- Sundial at the highway entrance of Sangudo

- Location of Sangudo
- Coordinates: 53°53′17″N 114°54′0″W
- Country: Canada
- Province: Alberta
- Region: Central Alberta
- Census Division: No. 13
- Municipal district: Lac Ste. Anne County

Government
  - Mayor: William Hegy
  - Governing body: Lac Ste. Anne County Council: Ross Bohnet; Wayne Borle; Dwight Davidson; Lloyd Glebelhaus; William Hegy; Robert Kohn; Lorne Olsvik

Area (2021)
  - Land: 2.8 km^{2} (1.1 sq mi)
- Elevation: 680 m (2,230 ft)

Population (2021)
  - Total: 298
  - Density: 106.3/km^{2} (275/sq mi)
- Demonym: Sangudoite
- Time zone: UTC−06:00 (Alberta Time)
- Highways: 43; 757
- Waterways: Pembina River
- Website: Official website

Sangudo is a hamlet in Alberta, Canada within Lac Ste. Anne County. It is located on Highway 43 and the Pembina River, approximately 99 kilometres (62 mi) northwest of Edmonton.

Sangudo was formerly incorporated as a village on April 12, 1937, but dissolved and reverted to hamlet status effective September 16, 2007.

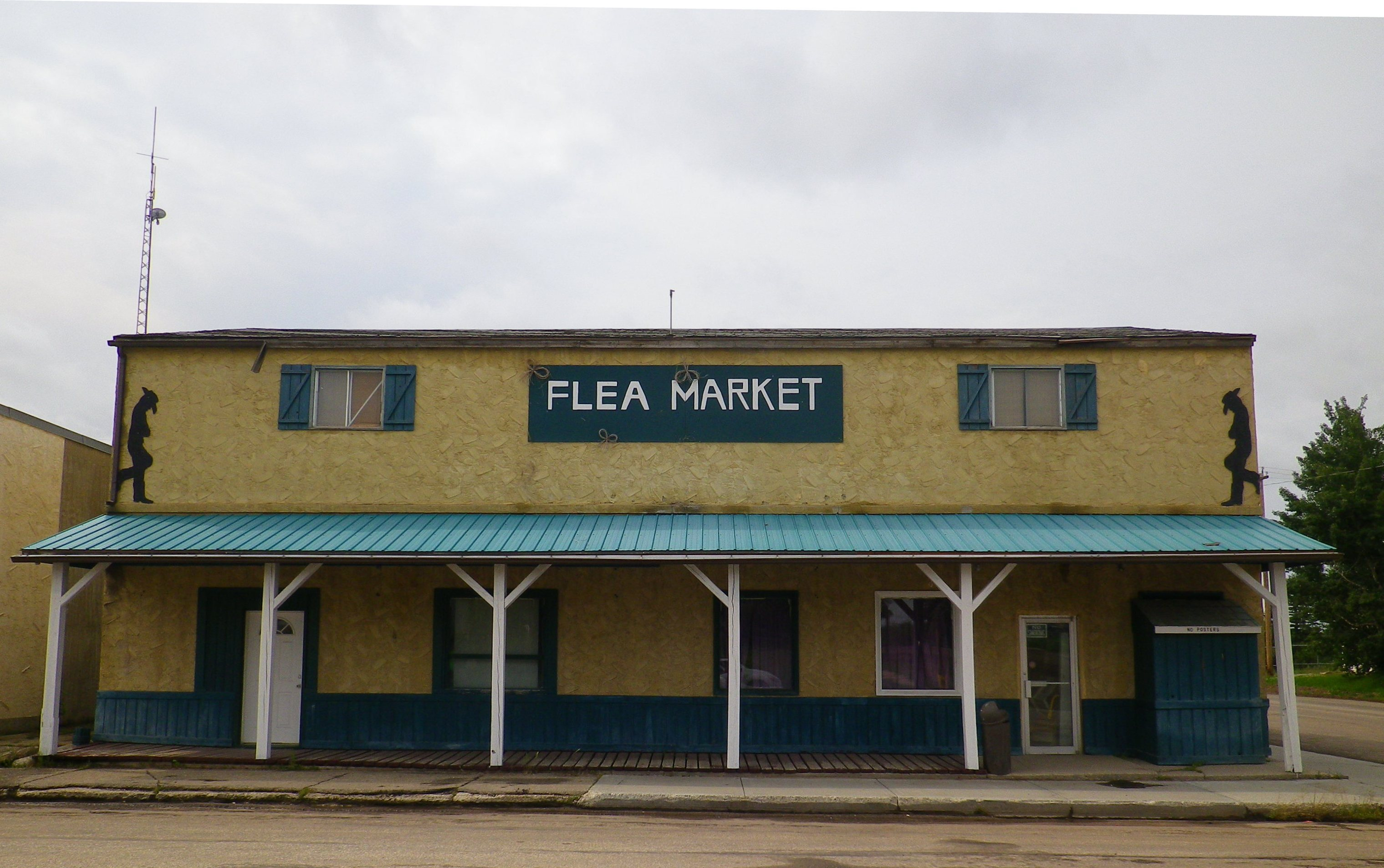
Building in Sangudo

== Demographics ==
In the 2021 Census of Population conducted by Statistics Canada, Sangudo had a population of 298 living in 153 of its 178 total private dwellings, a change of −0.3% from its 2016 population of 299. With a land area of 2.8 km^{2} (1.1 sq mi), it had a population density of 106.4/km^{2} (275.6/sq mi) in 2021.

As a designated place in the 2016 Census of Population conducted by Statistics Canada, Sangudo had a population of 299 living in 137 of its 171 total private dwellings, a change of −6.6% from its 2011 population of 320. With a land area of 2.72 km^{2} (1.05 sq mi), it had a population density of 109.9/km^{2} (284.7/sq mi) in 2016.

== Industry ==
The main sources of revenue for the hamlet are tourism from traffic along Highway 43, oil production, and agriculture (mostly cattle ranching).

== Attractions ==
The hamlet is the home to the closed Sangudo Speedway, a high-banked dirt oval that is a quarter-mile long. Sangudo also features a sundial tourist monument that can be seen from Highway 43. There is camping at Deep Creek Campground right on the Pembina River.

== Notable people ==
- Gene Zwozdesky Alberta teacher, musician, politician (12th Speaker of the Alberta Legislative Assembly), grew up in Sangudo.
- Clayton Brown 4 time QSPL Champion with the QSPL Pirates Softball Team.

== See also ==
- List of communities in Alberta
- List of former urban municipalities in Alberta
- List of hamlets in Alberta
