= Alberta Highway 947 =

Highway in Alberta, Canada

Highway 947

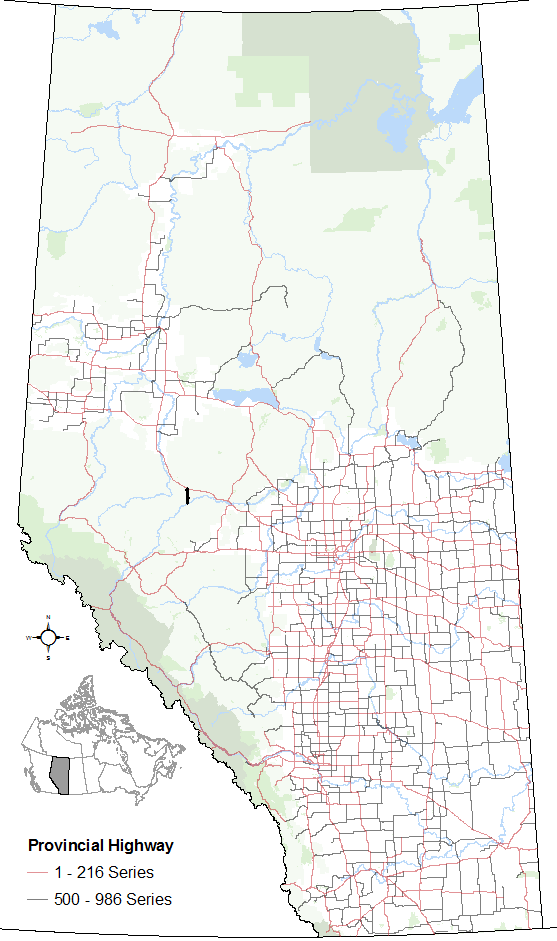

Route information
- Maintained by the Ministry of Transportation and Economic Corridors
- Length: 20 km (12 mi) Future - 89 km (55 mi)

Major junctions
- South end: Athabasca River
- North end: Highway 43 southeast of Fox Creek

Location
- Country: Canada
- Province: Alberta
- Specialized and rural municipalities: Yellowhead County, Woodlands County, Greenview M.D. No. 16

Highway system
- Alberta Numbered Highway Network; List; Former
← Highway 921	→ Highway 956

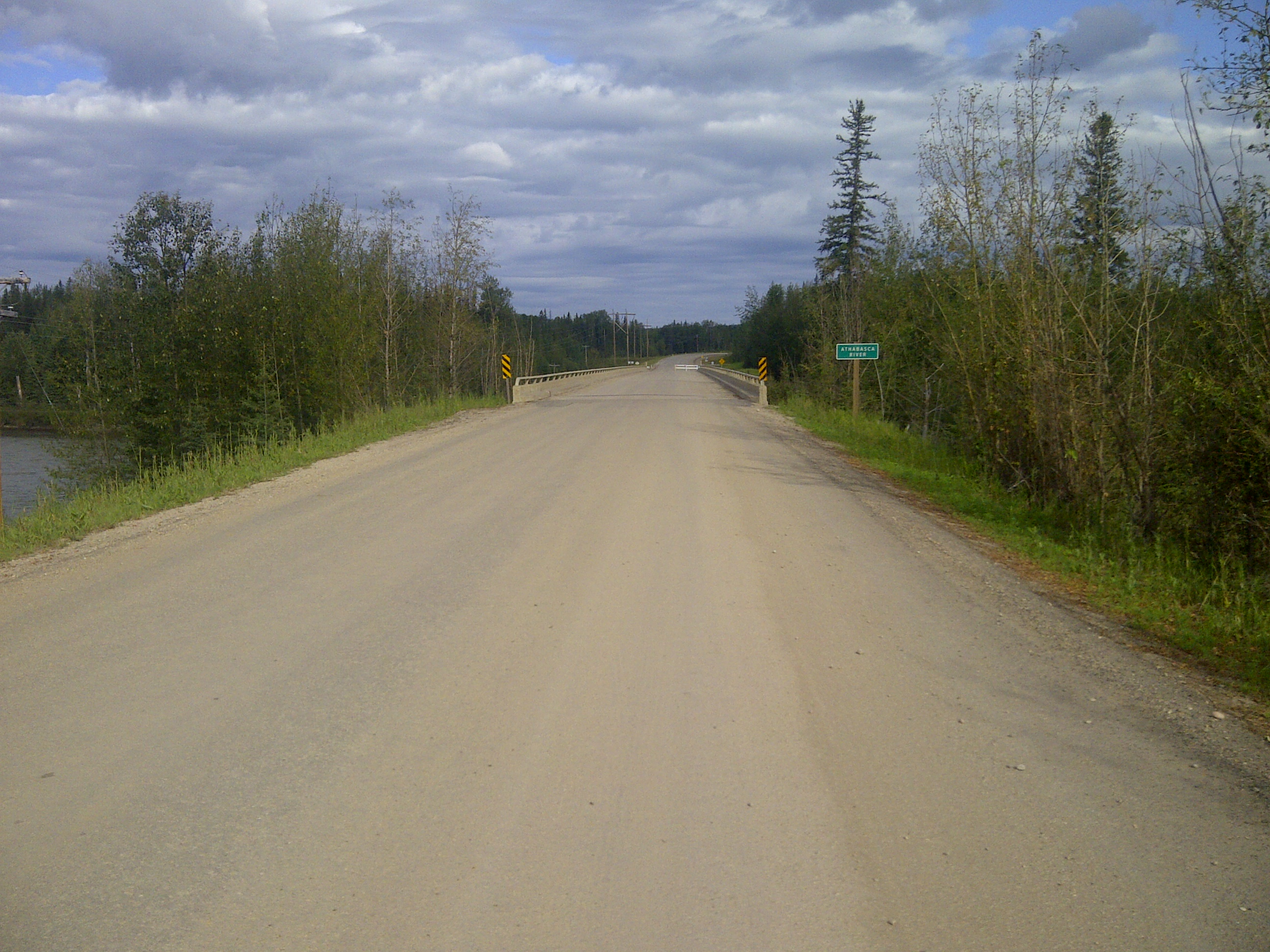
Highway 947 northbound approaching the Athabasca River bridge – the segment south of the river has yet to be improved to highway standards

Highway 947 is a designated north-south highway in northern Alberta, Canada that is partially constructed. Upon completion, the entire highway will span approximately 89 km (55 mi) from Highway 16 to Highway 43. The constructed portion of the highway consists of the final 20 km (12 mi) of the route from the Athabasca River to Highway 43.

== Route description ==
The constructed portion of Highway 947 begins at the north bank of the Athabasca River, which serves at the boundary between Woodlands County to the south and the Municipal District of Greenview No. 16 to the north. It is preceded by a bridge and a series of private resource roads that provides access to oil and gas facilities on the south side of the Athabasca River.

Proceeding north, the highway terminates at Highway 43, approximately 14 km (8.7 mi) southeast of the Town of Fox Creek.

Once fully constructed, Highway 947 will begin at Highway 16 (Yellowhead Highway) within Yellowhead County, approximately 10 km (6.2 mi) west of the Town of Edson, and will be preceded by Highway 47.

== History ==
=== Original alignment ===
Highway 947 was first designated in the early 1970s, but in a different alignment. At that time, the highway began at Highway 16 within Edson. It traveled northeast using the general alignment that is now designated Highway 748, and then north to Swan Hills via Whitecourt using the general alignment that is now designated Highway 32. From Swan Hills, it continued north to Highway 2 using the general alignment that is now designated Highway 33.

By the mid-1970s however, the portion of this original alignment of Highway 947 from Edson to present day Highway 32 was renumbered to Highway 748, while the balance of this original alignment to Highway 2 was renumbered to Highway 932.

=== Current alignment ===
In the mid-1970s, after the original Highway 947 was renumbered to Highway 748 and Highway 932, the Highway 947 designation was applied to the current alignment of the highway from the Athabasca River to Highway 43. Previously at a gravel standard, this segment of the highway was paved in 2009.

The balance of this highway was planned by the Province of Alberta and identified as a future resource highway in the 1980s, but economic constraints prevented its construction.

== Future ==
Headed by Yellowhead County, the most recent lobby effort to construct the balance of Highway 947 began in late 2010. In early 2011, the lobby effort expanded to the Grande Alberta Economic Region, an alliance of 12 municipalities, to which the towns of Edson and Fox Creek have obliged. As part of its lobbying efforts, Yellowhead County has committed to constructing the first 6.5 km (4 mi) of Highway 947 (Range Road 183) north Highway 16 to a paved standard with a scheduled completion of 2013. Alberta Transportation approached the Canadian Environmental Assessment Agency in 2014 to determine if a federal environmental assessment would be required to construct and operate the highway extension.

== Major intersections ==
The following is a list of existing and future major intersections along Highway 947 from south to north.

Location	km	mi	Destinations	Notes
Yellowhead County	−69	−43	Highway 16 (TCH/YH) – Jasper, Edson, Edmonton; Highway 47 south – Robb	Proposed southern extension
Woodlands County	No major junctions			
M.D. of Greenview No. 16	0	0.0	Crosses the Athabasca River	
M.D. of Greenview No. 16	20	12	Highway 43 – Grande Prairie, Whitecourt, Edmonton	Near Fox Creek
1.000 mi = 1.609 km; 1.000 km = 0.621 mi: Unopened
