= Rochfort Bridge =

- Hamlet
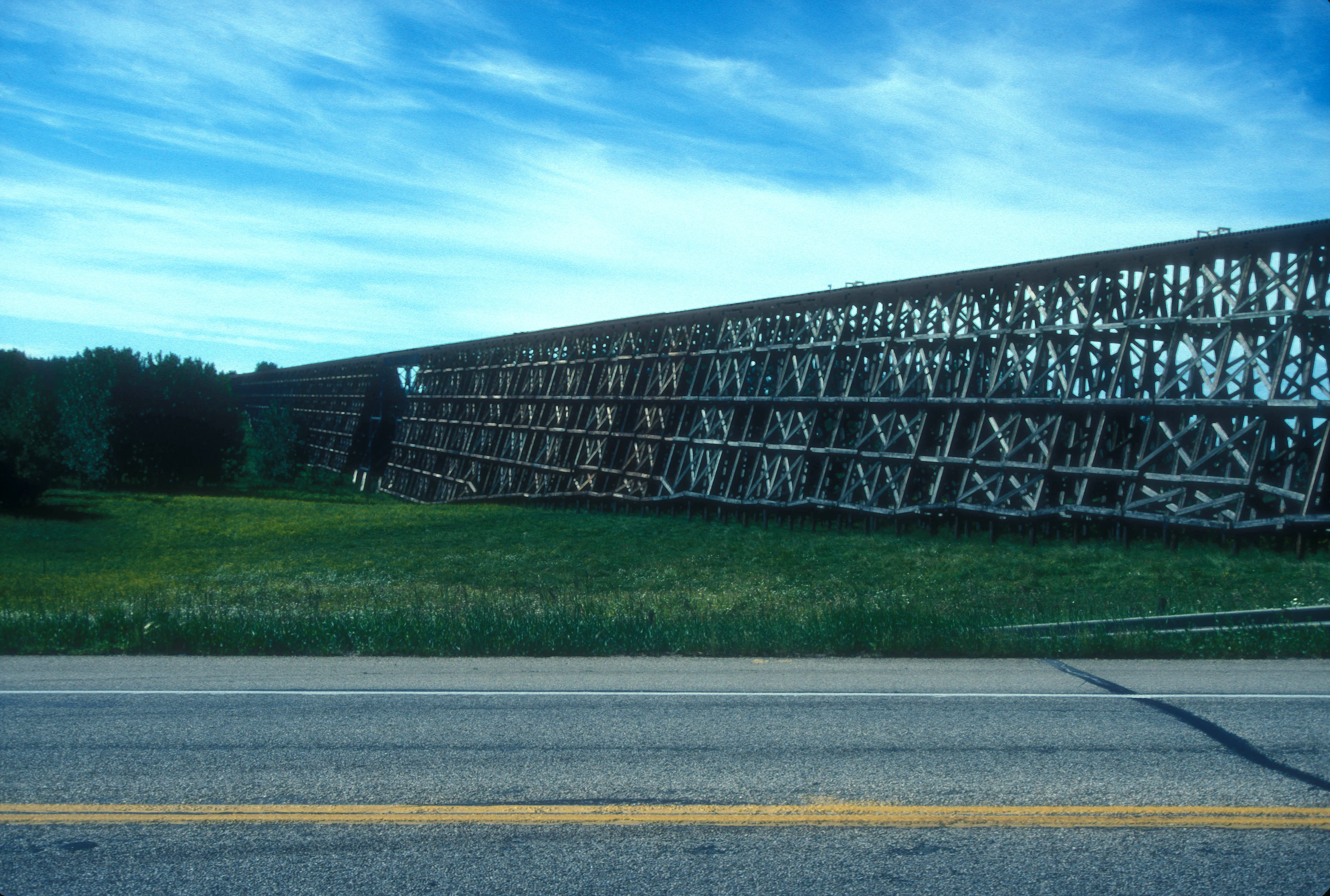
- The Rochfort Trestle Bridge

- Location within Alberta Location within Canada Location within North America
- Coordinates: 53.912309°N 115.04258°W
- Country: Canada
- Province: Alberta
- Municipal district: Lac Ste. Anne County

Population (2008)
  - Total: 71
- Time zone: UTC−06:00 (Alberta Time)
- Postal code: T0E 1N0

Rochfort Bridge is a hamlet in Alberta, Canada within Lac Ste. Anne County. It is located approximately 105 kilometres (65 mi) northwest of Edmonton and 8 kilometres (5.0 mi) east of Mayerthorpe. Rochfort Bridge is named for Cooper (Cowper) Rochfort, who with his associate, Percy Michaelson, homesteaded on the Paddle River at the point where the old trail from Lac Ste. Anne to the MacLeod River crossed the Paddle River.

One of North America’s longest wooden train trestles is located just east of the hamlet, which crosses over the Paddle River valley and Highway 43. Rochfort Bridge Trestle was built in 1919 by Canadian Northern Railway.

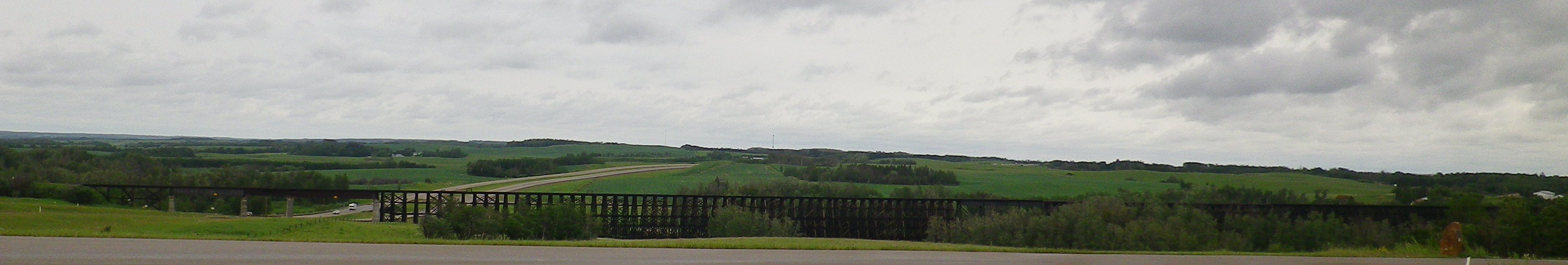

== History ==
A farm near Rochfort Bridge and Mayerthorpe was the site of the Mayerthorpe tragedy on March 3, 2005, in which four officers of the Royal Canadian Mounted Police were shot and killed in a raid on a marijuana drug operation.

On December 5, 2019, a fire broke out in a home inside the hamlet. In the early morning hours of December 6, fire crews announced a body had been discovered, and later on after a more extensive search, four more bodies had been discovered. Two adults, Marvin and Janet Gibbs, and their three grandchildren all were killed in the fire.

== Demographics ==
Population history of Rochfort Bridge
Year	Pop.	±%
1941	87	—
1951	132	+51.7%
1956	101	−23.5%
1961	85	−15.8%
1966	77	−9.4%
1971	63	−18.2%
1976	69	+9.5%
1981	62	−10.1%
1986	72	+16.1%
1991	81	+12.5%
Source: Statistics Canada

The population of Rochfort Bridge according to the 2008 municipal census conducted by Lac Ste. Anne County is 71.

== Notable people ==
- Peter Trynchy – Canadian politician, Progressive Conservative MLA (1971-2001) and cabinet minister

== See also ==
- List of communities in Alberta
- List of hamlets in Alberta
