= Demmitt =

- Hamlet
- Location of Demmitt Demmitt (Canada)
- Coordinates: 55°27′20″N 119°53′48″W
- Country: Canada
- Province: Alberta
- Region: Northern Alberta
- Census division: 19
- Municipal district: County of Grande Prairie No. 1

Government
  - Type: Unincorporated
  - Governing body: County of Grande Prairie No. 1 Council
- Time zone: UTC−06:00 (Alberta Time)
- Area codes: 780, 587, 825

Demmitt is a hamlet in northern Alberta, Canada within the County of Grande Prairie No. 1. It is located on Highway 43, approximately 77 kilometres (48 mi) northwest of Grande Prairie. The Northern Alberta Railway was built through the area in 1930 as it extended westwards towards Dawson Creek, British Columbia.

== See also ==
- List of communities in Alberta
- List of hamlets in Alberta
