= Gunn, Alberta =

Gunn
- Hamlet
- Location of Gunn in Alberta
- Coordinates: 53.7269°N 114.3436°W
- Country: Canada
- Province: Alberta
- Census division: No. 13
- Municipal district: Lac Ste. Anne County

Government
  - Type: Unincorporated
  - Reeve: William Hegy
  - Governing body: Lac Ste. Anne County Council: Ross Bohnet; Wayne Borle; Dwight Davidson; Lloyd Glebelhaus; William Hegy; Robert Kohn; Lorne Olsvik

Area (2021)
  - Land: 0.44 km^{2} (0.17 sq mi)
- Elevation: 740 m (2,430 ft)

Population (2021)
  - Total: 26
  - Density: 59.7/km^{2} (155/sq mi)
- Time zone: UTC−06:00 (Alberta Time)

Gunn is a hamlet in Alberta, Canada within Lac Ste. Anne County. It is located west of the junction of Highway 43 and Highway 33 on the northeast shore of Lac Ste. Anne. It is approximately 58 kilometres (36 mi) northwest of Edmonton and has an elevation of 740 metres (2,430 ft).

The hamlet is located in Census Division No. 13 and in the federal riding of Yellowhead.

The community has the name of Peter Gunn, Hudson's Bay Company factor at Lac Ste. Anne and first MLA for that constituency.

The first post office was established in 1915.

== Demographics ==
In the 2021 Census of Population conducted by Statistics Canada, Gunn had a population of 26 living in 10 of its 18 total private dwellings, a change of 73.3% from its 2016 population of 15. With a land area of 0.44 km^{2} (0.17 sq mi), it had a population density of 59.1/km^{2} (153.0/sq mi) in 2021.

As a designated place in the 2016 Census of Population conducted by Statistics Canada, Gunn had a population of 10 living in 4 of its 10 total private dwellings, an increase from its 2011 population of 0. With a land area of 0.01 km^{2} (0.0039 sq mi), it had a population density of 1,000.0/km^{2} (2,590.0/sq mi) in 2016.

== See also ==
- List of communities in Alberta
- List of designated places in Alberta
- List of hamlets in Alberta
- Peter Gunn (Alberta politician)
