= Manly Corner, Alberta =

Manly Corner
- Locality
- Location of Manly Corner in Alberta
- Coordinates: 53°34′15″N 114°13′17″W
- Country: Canada
- Province: Alberta
- Region: Edmonton Metropolitan Region
- Census division: 11
- Municipal district: Parkland County

Government
  - Type: Unincorporated
  - Mayor: Allan Gamble
  - Governing body: Parkland County Council: Natalie Birnie; Allan William Hoefsloot; Phyllis Kobasiuk; Kristina Kowalski; Sally Kucher Johnson; Rob Wiedeman
- Elevation: 736 m (2,415 ft)
- Time zone: UTC−7 (MST)
  - Summer (DST): UTC−6 (MDT)
- Postal code span: T7Y
- Area codes: 780, 587, 825
- Highways: Highway 16 (TCH); Highway 43; Highway 770

Manly Corner is a locality where the Yellowhead Highway (Highway 16) intersects Highway 43 in Parkland County, Alberta. It is named after the nearby former locality of Manly, located northeast of the junction. An Alberta Heritage marker describes this Highway as leading to Dawson Creek, British Columbia, where the Alaska Highway begins, and signifies where the CANAMEX Corridor transitions from Highway 16 to Highway 43.

Manly Corner is located about 35 kilometres (22 mi) west of Edmonton.
