= Yellowstone, Alberta =

Yellowstone
- Summer village
- Summer Village of Yellowstone
- Location of Yellowstone in Alberta
- Coordinates: 53.73353°N 114.38068°W
- Country: Canada
- Province: Alberta
- Census division: No. 13

Government
  - Type: Municipal incorporation
  - Mayor: Jeff Stolte
  - Governing body: Yellowstone Summer Village Council

Area (2021)
  - Land: 0.28 km^{2} (0.11 sq mi)

Population (2021)
  - Total: 117
  - Density: 424.1/km^{2} (1,098/sq mi)
- Time zone: UTC−06:00 (Alberta Time)
- Website: Official website

Yellowstone is a summer village in Alberta, Canada. It is developed on the northern shore of Lac Ste. Anne, south of Alberta Highway 43, between Ross Haven and Gunn, 78 kilometres (48 mi) from Edmonton.

== Demographics ==
In the 2021 Census of Population conducted by Statistics Canada, the Summer Village of Yellowstone had a population of 117 living in 58 of its 149 total private dwellings, a change of −14.6% from its 2016 population of 137. With a land area of 0.28 km^{2} (0.11 sq mi), it had a population density of 417.9/km^{2} (1,082.2/sq mi) in 2021.

In the 2016 Census of Population conducted by Statistics Canada, the Summer Village of Yellowstone had a population of 137 living in 63 of its 145 total private dwellings, a 10.5% change from its 2011 population of 124. With a land area of 0.28 km^{2} (0.11 sq mi), it had a population density of 489.3/km^{2} (1,267.2/sq mi) in 2016.

The Summer Village of Yellowstone's 2012 municipal census counted a population of 131.

== See also ==
- List of communities in Alberta
- List of summer villages in Alberta
- List of resort villages in Saskatchewan
