= Island Lake South =

Summer village in Alberta, Canada

- Summer village
- Summer Village of Island Lake South
- Location of Island Lake South in Alberta
- Coordinates: 54.83109°N 113.54413°W
- Country: Canada
- Province: Alberta
- Census division: No. 13

Government
  - Type: Municipal incorporation
  - Mayor: Gary Tym
  - Governing body: Island Lake South Summer Village Council

Area (2021)
  - Land: 0.48 km^{2} (0.19 sq mi)

Population (2021)
  - Total: 81
  - Density: 170/km^{2} (440/sq mi)
- Time zone: UTC−06:00 (Alberta Time)
- Website: Official website

Island Lake South is a summer village in Alberta, Canada. It is located on the southern shore of Island Lake, along Highway 2, northwest of Athabasca.

== Demographics ==
In the 2021 Census of Population conducted by Statistics Canada, the Summer Village of Island Lake had a population of 174 living in 80 of its 219 total private dwellings, a change of −23.7% from its 2016 population of 228. With a land area of 1.55 km^{2} (0.60 sq mi), it had a population density of 112.3/km^{2} (290.7/sq mi) in 2021.

In the 2016 Census of Population conducted by Statistics Canada, the Summer Village of Island Lake South had a population of 61 living in 30 of its 74 total private dwellings, a −15.3% change from its 2011 population of 72. With a land area of 0.67 km^{2} (0.26 sq mi), it had a population density of 91.0/km^{2} (235.8/sq mi) in 2016.

== See also ==
- List of communities in Alberta
- List of summer villages in Alberta
- List of resort villages in Saskatchewan
