= South Baptiste =

- Summer village
- Summer Village of South Baptiste
- Location of South Baptiste in Alberta
- Coordinates: 54.72397°N 113.56928°W
- Country: Canada
- Province: Alberta
- Census division: No. 13

Government
  - Type: Municipal incorporation
  - Mayor: Blaine Page
  - Governing body: South Baptiste Summer Village Council

Area (2021)
  - Land: 0.91 km^{2} (0.35 sq mi)

Population (2021)
  - Total: 70
  - Density: 77/km^{2} (200/sq mi)
- Time zone: UTC−06:00 (Alberta Time)
- Website: Official website

South Baptiste is a summer village in Alberta, Canada. It is located on the southern shore of Baptiste Lake, west of Athabasca.

== Demographics ==
In the 2021 Census of Population conducted by Statistics Canada, the Summer Village of South Baptiste had a population of 70 living in 33 of its 76 total private dwellings, a change of 6.1% from its 2016 population of 66. With a land area of 0.91 km^{2} (0.35 sq mi), it had a population density of 76.9/km^{2} (199.2/sq mi) in 2021.

In the 2016 Census of Population conducted by Statistics Canada, the Summer Village of South Baptiste had a population of 66 living in 30 of its 77 total private dwellings, a 26.9% change from its 2011 population of 52. With a land area of 0.93 km^{2} (0.36 sq mi), it had a population density of 71.0/km^{2} (183.8/sq mi) in 2016.

== See also ==
- List of communities in Alberta
- List of summer villages in Alberta
- List of resort villages in Saskatchewan
