= Alberta Highway 43 =

Highway in Alberta

Highway 43

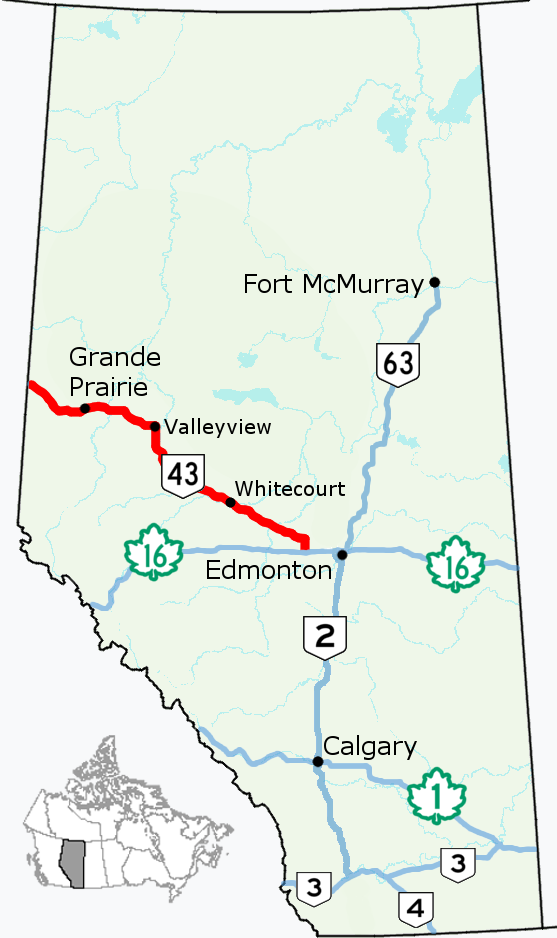
- Highway 43 highlighted in red

Route information
- Maintained by the Ministry of Transportation and Economic Corridors
- Length: 495.0 km (307.6 mi)

Major junctions
- West end: Highway 2 at British Columbia border west of Demmitt
- Highway 59 near Hythe; Highway 40 in Grande Prairie; Highway 2 near Grande Prairie; Highway 49 in Valleyview; Highway 32 in Whitecourt; Highway 18 in Green Court; Highway 22 in Mayerthorpe; Highway 33 near Gunn; Highway 37 near Onoway
- East end: Highway 16 (TCH) at Manly Corner

Location
- Country: Canada
- Province: Alberta
- Specialized and rural municipalities: County of Grande Prairie No. 1, Greenview No. 16 M.D., Woodlands County, Lac Ste. Anne County, Parkland County
- Major cities: Grande Prairie
- Towns: Beaverlodge, Wembley, Valleyview, Fox Creek, Whitecourt, Mayerthorpe
- Villages: Hythe

Highway system
- Alberta Numbered Highway Network; List; Former
- CANAMEX Corridor
← Highway 42	→ Highway 44

Highway 43 is a major highway in northern and central Alberta, Canada, that connects Edmonton to the British Columbia border via the Peace Country, forming the northernmost portion of the CANAMEX Corridor in Alberta. It stretches approximately 495 kilometres (308 mi) from Highway 16 (Yellowhead Highway) near Manly Corner west of Edmonton to the British Columbia border west of Demmitt. It is designated as a core route in Canada's National Highway System, comprising a portion of a key international corridor that stretches from Alaska into Mexico.

Highway 43 was originally numbered Highway 17, a short gravel road that ran only from Highway 16 to Onoway. It was later extended to Whitecourt and renumbered as Highway 43 in the 1940s, and an extension to Valleyview had been completed by the mid-1950s. In 1991 the highway was extended to included a portion of the existing Highway 34 from Valleyview to Donnelly, but was revised in 1998 to turn west through Grande Prairie, forming a contiguous route from Manly Corner to the border. Due to increasing traffic levels and the province's greater plan to upgrade their portion of the CANAMEX Corridor, work began in the 2000s to twin the entire length of the highway. The Edmonton–Grande Prairie section was completed in summer 2014, and construction began in 2016 on an expressway bypass to the northwest of Grande Prairie. Planning is underway for the remaining section between the BC border and Beaverlodge.

== Route description ==
Highway 43 begins west of Demmitt at the British Columbia border and runs through Grande Prairie, Valleyview, and Whitecourt to Highway 16 near Manly Corner west of Edmonton.

== History ==
=== Construction and paving ===
The history of Highway 43 dates back to the late 1920s or early 1930s. It was originally numbered Highway 17 and, by 1932, it spanned approximately 17 km from Highway 16 to Onoway. By 1938, Highway 17 (now 43) had been extended to Sangudo, and it had reached Whitecourt via a jagged alignment with numerous 90° jogs by 1940. Sometime between 1942 and 1946, the highway was renumbered to Highway 43. The former number was transferred to Highway 17 that straddles the Alberta/Saskatchewan provincial boundary north and south of Lloydminster.

By 1952, extension of Highway 43 from Whitecourt to Valleyview was well underway. The segment of the highway from Valleyview to Little Smoky was complete, while the segment from Whitecourt to Two Creeks was under construction. The next segment of the highway, from Little Smoky to west of Giroux Lake, opened a year later. In 1954, the connecting segment of Highway 43 between west of Giroux Lake and Two Creeks was under construction. Meanwhile, paving of the highway between Highway 16 and Gunn was complete.

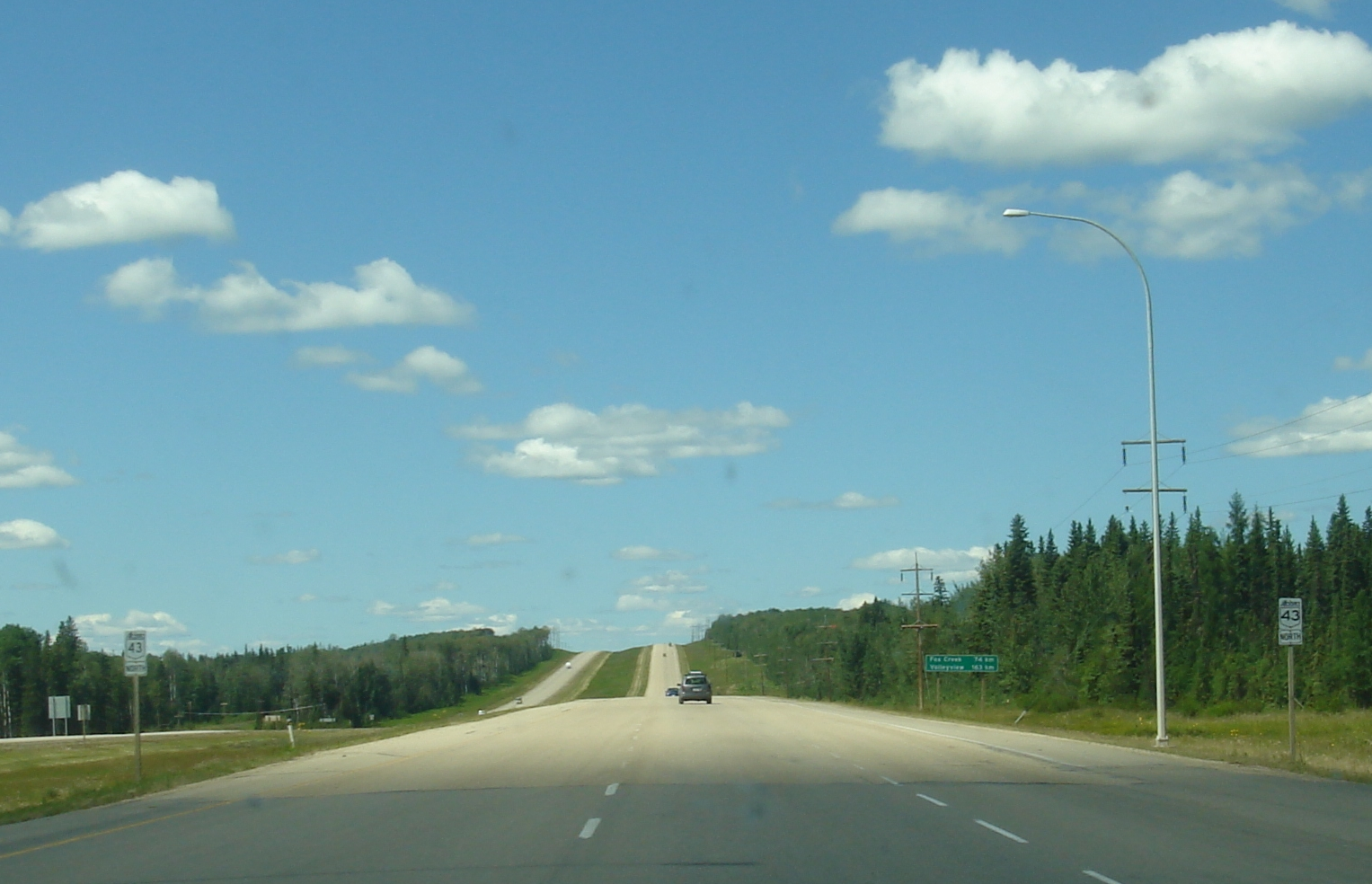
Westbound lanes of Highway 43, west of Whitecourt

The final segment of Highway 43 between Whitecourt and Valleyview was officially completed in 1955 and a ribbon-cutting ceremony was held in the Iosegun River valley, approximately 20 km southeast of Fox Creek. The completion of the highway provided the south Peace Region of northwest Alberta, particularly Grande Prairie and Valleyview, with a more direct and significantly shorter route to Edmonton. It also slightly shortened the driving distance from Peace River to Edmonton once the Highway 34 realignment north of Valleyview was completed by 1959. An aggressive paving program began shortly after the highway was completed. Paving began northwest of Whitecourt and south of Valleyview. By 1960, the entire length of the highway was paved, which included a significant realignment between Whitecourt and Cottonwood Corner south of Blue Ridge and other minor realignments between Cottonwood Corner and Gunn to smooth out the highway's numerous jogs.

=== Extension by renumbering ===
In 1990/1991, Highway 43 was extended by the province through a highway renumbering. In particular, the stretch of highway between Valleyview and Donnelly (Highways 34 and 2) was renumbered to Highway 43. However, this extension proved to last only until 1998 when the province completed a second set of highway renumberings in northwest Alberta.

On March 1, 1998, the portion of Highway 43 north of Valleyview was renumbered to Highway 49 to allow for the renumbering of Highway 34 (from Valleyview to north of Grande Prairie), and Highway 2 (from north of Grande Prairie to the British Columbia border via Grande Prairie, Beaverlodge and Hythe) was renumbered as Highway 43. The renumbering had two advantages: it established Highway 43 as a continuous highway number from Highway 16 through the Peace Country to the British Columbia border, simplifying travel, and it created fewer highway number changes along the CANAMEX Corridor, the Alberta portion of which stretches from Coutts at the United States border to the BC border west of Grande Prairie.

=== Twinning ===
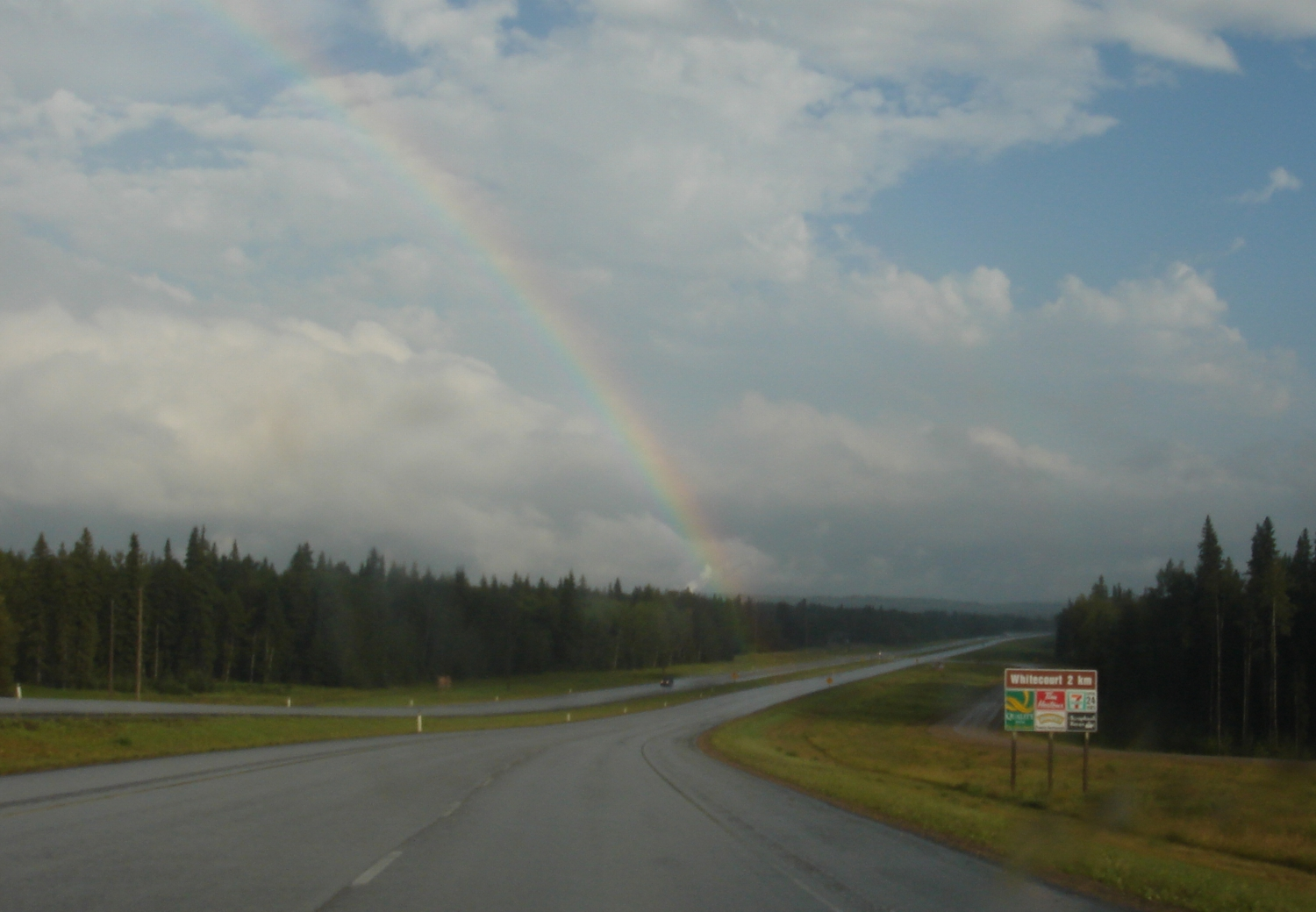
Highway 43 eastbound, west of Whitecourt

The initial twinning of Highway 43 began in the early 1970s with the first segment, from Highway 16 to north of Highway 633 (then numbered Highway 33), open by 1974. Eight years later, the second segment was twinned from north of Highway 633 to west of Gunn.

Twinning of Highway 43 then ceased for 15 years until a segment within Whitecourt from Govenlock Road/Mill Road, just east of the McLeod River, to east of 33 Street in Whitecourt's southeast end was opened by 1997. Shortly after this segment was twinned, the province announced an aggressive twinning program for the highway from Gunn to the BC border as part of Alberta's North-South Trade (CANAMEX) Corridor initiative. By 1999, the twinning program saw its first two segments open – from Grande Prairie westward towards British Columbia (halfway to Wembley) and from Whitecourt eastward towards Edmonton (halfway to Highway 658).

Two years later, the twinned portions of Highway 43 west of Grande Prairie and east of Whitecourt had been extended to Highway 724 serving Wembley and Highway 658 serving Blue Ridge respectively. Also in 2001, twinning in three other locations was complete – from east of Highway 2 to west of Highway 733 (east of Grande Prairie), from the eastern boundary of the Sturgeon Lake Cree Nation through Valleyview to south of Highway 665, and from northwest of Fox Creek to southeast of Fox Creek near the Highway 947 intersection.

In 2002, the two largest newly twinned segments of Highway 43 had opened to traffic. The largest segment stretched from Whitecourt to west of Two Creeks. The other segment stretched from west of Highway 733 to Crooked Creek, which included a realignment to bypass Bezanson. The interchange with Highway 2 north of Grande Prairie also opened to traffic on October 3, 2002. By 2003, the first newly twinned segment in over 20 years at Highway 43's southeastern end was open to traffic – starting from west of Gunn and ending east of Highway 765 near Glenevis. Also, the brief 2 km segment from Highway 2 (north of Grande Prairie) to east of Highway 2 opened upon completion of an interchange at Highway 2 and a grade separation over a CN rail line. By 2004, three additional segments of Highway 43 had been twinned. The first was from northwest of Fox Creek to near Giroux Lake. The second was filling in the gap between Fox Creek and Whitecourt from west of Highway 947 to west of Two Creeks. The third was from east of Highway 658 to east of Green Court/Highway 18.

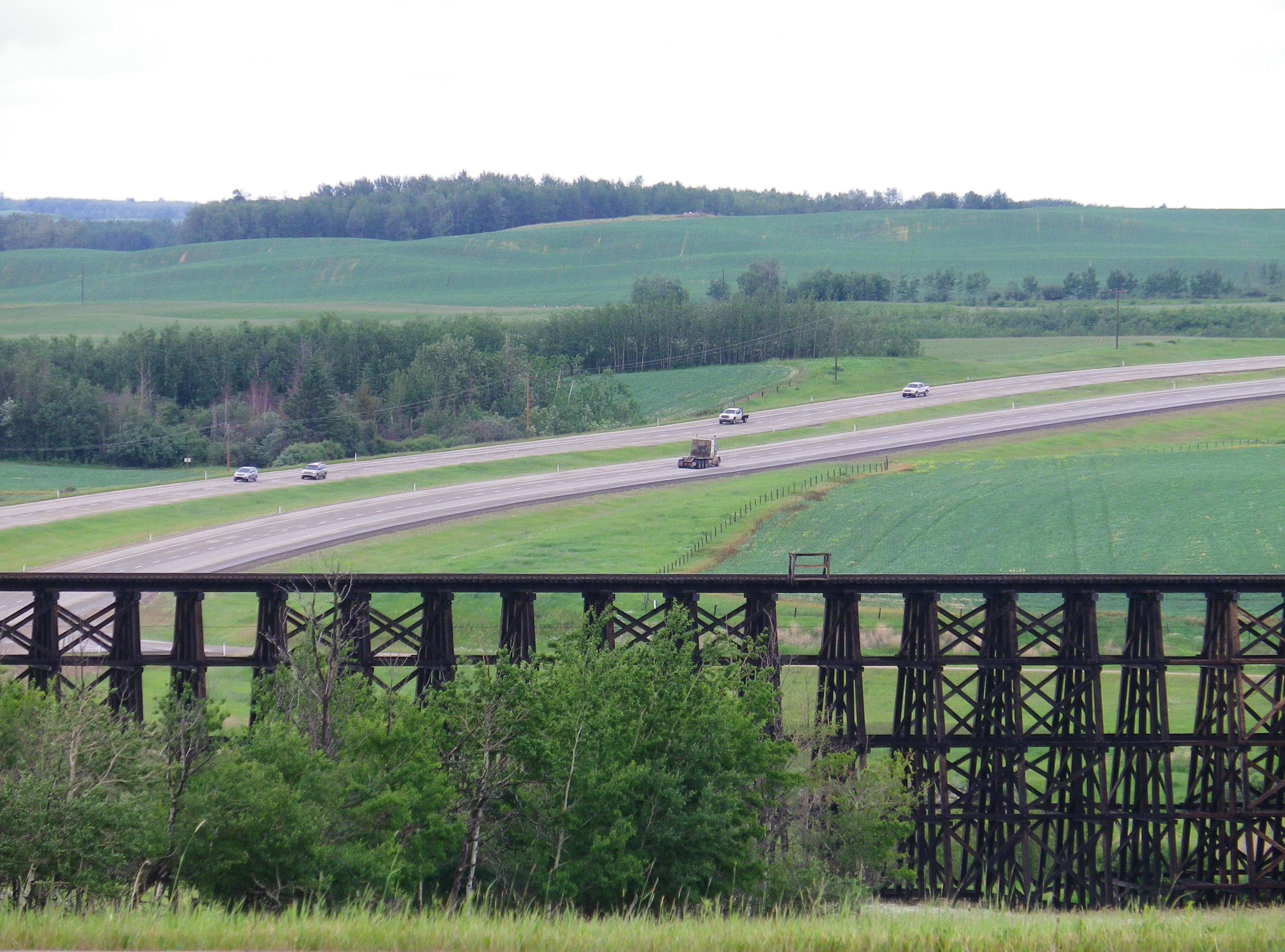
The Rochfort Bridge is one of North America's longest wooden railway bridges. It crosses Highway 43 near the hamlet of the same name.

In 2005, three segments of twinned Highway 43 opened to traffic including 15.4 km (9.6 mi) from west of Fox Creek to west of Iosegun Lake, 19.1 km (11.9 mi) from west of Sangudo to west of Cherhill, and 14.1 km (8.8 mi) from west of Cherhill to west of Gunn. The twinning of two additional segments of Highway 43 was completed in 2007, including 35 km (22 mi) from Asplund Creek (south of Highway 665) to west of Iosegun Lake (south of Little Smoky), and 18.5 km (11.5 mi) from east of Green Court to west of Sangudo. With these segments completed, over 300 km (190 mi) of Highway 43 was continuously twinned from Highway 16 to west of Valleyview.

Also in 2007, the Government of Alberta announced that twinning of Highway 43 would go through the Sturgeon Lake Cree Nation after previously deciding in 2006 to bypass it by routing the highway to the north side of Sturgeon Lake. Subsequently, construction of the remaining 36 km (22 mi) between Crooked Creek and Valleyview, including 17 km (11 mi) through the Sturgeon Lake Cree Nation, began in the fall of 2010 and was completed on Sept. 12, 2014. In 2010, 13 km (8.1 mi) from Highway 723 east of Beaverlodge to Highway 724 at Wembley was twinned.

=== Grande Prairie bypass ===
In September 2019, the western leg of the Grande Prairie bypass as completed and opened to traffic in September 2019. In December 2018, then-premier Rachel Notley announced a new, full interchange at Highway 43X (Grande Prairie bypass) and Highway 43 (100 Avenue); however, the interchange is still several years into the future. As part of the project, Highway 43 was moved to the Grande Prairie Bypass (previously designated as Highway 43X) while the former 13 km (8 mi) section through Grande Prairie along 100 Avenue, 108 Street/116 Avenue, and 100 Street became jurisdiction of the City of Grande Prairie.

== Highway 43X ==
Highway 43X
- Location: Grande Prairie
- Length: 3.3 km (2.1 mi)
- Existed: 2010–2019

Highway 43X is the temporary designation of future realignments of Highway 43 in northwest Alberta – one was a partially constructed northwest bypass around Grande Prairie, and the other will act as a south bypass around Whitecourt once constructed in the future.

=== Grande Prairie ===
The first segment of the Grande Prairie bypass, initially signed as Highway 43X, opened to traffic on July 30, 2010, to a twinned standard. It was 3.3 km (2.1 mi) in length, extending westward from the Highway 43/2 interchange, 2.5 km (1.6 mi) north of Grande Prairie city limits, to 116 Street/Range Road 63, serving Grande Prairie to the south and the County of Grande Prairie No. 1 to the north. The next segment of the bypass, 10.5 km (6.5 mi) in length, was announced in April 2016 and was completed and opened to traffic in September 2019. As part of the project, Highway 43X became part of Highway 43.

=== Whitecourt ===
A study for the future alignment of a south bypass around Whitecourt was completed in the 1980s, with a future alignment being registered in 1984. The registered alignment begins in west Whitecourt, just north of a Canadian National (CN) rail line, and ends southeast of Whitecourt, just west of Highway 43's current at-grade intersection with East Mountain Road (Range Road 115B)/Deer Foot Road (Township Road 592B). The bypass will cross over the CN rail line, Highway 32, the McLeod River, Govenlock Road/West Mountain Road (Range Road 122) and Beaver Creek. Three interchange opportunities have been identified – one in the vicinity of the current Highway 43/32 interchange in west Whitecourt, one at Govenlock Road/West Mountain Road, and one at the east end of the bypass southeast of Whitecourt. The design of the future interchange in west Whitecourt is anticipated to be complicated by the convergence of two existing highways, the adjacency of the CN rail line, the short distance between Highway 32 and the McLeod River to the south, existing highway commercial and industrial development along Highway 43 and Highway 32 respectively, and the close proximity of another interchange opportunity 1.2 km (0.75 mi) to the southeast at Govenlock Road/West Mountain Road, just east of the McLeod River. The right-of-way is designated as Highway 43X.

A functional planning study was initiated in 2008 for the Highway 43/43X interchange southeast of Whitecourt. The study considers three options, all of which incorporate a direct connection to East Mountain Road. Construction of the interchange is not anticipated to occur for 5–10 years. A functional plan for the remainder of the bypass has not yet been undertaken, and is anticipated to be planned under a separate project.

== Major intersections ==
Rural/specialized municipality	Location	km	mi	Destinations	Notes
County of Grande Prairie No. 1		0.0	0.0	Highway 2 west – Dawson Creek, Alaska Highway	Continuation into British Columbia
County of Grande Prairie No. 1		20.2	12.6	Highway 59 east – Sexsmith, Peace River	
County of Grande Prairie No. 1	Hythe	32.4	20.1	Highway 721 north	
County of Grande Prairie No. 1	Hythe	34.7	21.6	Highway 672 (Emerson Trail) – Lymburn	
County of Grande Prairie No. 1		42.3	26.3	Highway 671 west – Goodfare	
County of Grande Prairie No. 1	Beaverlodge	48.0	29.8	Highway 722 south	
County of Grande Prairie No. 1		52.8	32.8	Highway 723 north – Valhalla Centre	
County of Grande Prairie No. 1		56.5	35.1	Highway 667 west – Elmworth, Rio Grande	
County of Grande Prairie No. 1		64.8	40.3	Range Road 85	Former Highway 724 south
County of Grande Prairie No. 1	Wembley	68.1	42.3	Highway 724 north – La Glace	
County of Grande Prairie No. 1		71.4	44.4	PAR 117 north – Saskatoon Island Provincial Park	
City of Grande Prairie		81.8	50.8	100 Avenue to Highway 40 south – Grande Prairie Airport, City Centre, Grande Cache, Hinton	Interchange proposed; former Highway 43 east; future Highway 40X south
City of Grande Prairie		92.3	57.4	Range Road 63 (116 Street)	Roundabout
County of Grande Prairie No. 1	Clairmont	95.5	59.3	Highway 2 north / 100 Street – Grande Prairie City Centre, Peace River	Interchange; former Highway 43 west
County of Grande Prairie No. 1	Bezanson	121.6	75.6	Highway 733 north – Teepee Creek; Highway 670 south – Grande Prairie	
↑ / ↓		129.8	80.7	Crosses the Smoky River	
M.D. of Greenview No. 16		136.5	84.8	Forestry Trunk Road	Former Highway 734
M.D. of Greenview No. 16	DeBolt	146.2	90.8	Highway 736 north	
M.D. of Greenview No. 16	Sturgeon Heights	172.6	107.2	PAR 135 north – Young's Point Provincial Park	
Sturgeon Lake No. 154	Calais	180.9	112.4	PAR 113 north – Williamson Provincial Park	
M.D. of Greenview No. 16	Valleyview	199.4	123.9	Highway 49 north – Peace River	Roundabout under construction; Arctic Corridor southern terminus
M.D. of Greenview No. 16		206.7	128.4	Highway 665 east	
M.D. of Greenview No. 16		238.2	148.0	Crosses the Little Smoky River	
M.D. of Greenview No. 16	Little Smoky	238.9	148.4	Little Smoky Road	Former Highway 745
M.D. of Greenview No. 16	Fox Creek	285.4	177.3		
M.D. of Greenview No. 16		300.5	186.7	Highway 947 south	
Woodlands County		358.6	222.8	Highway 32 north – Swan Hills	West end of Highway 32 concurrency
Whitecourt		364.6	226.6	Crosses the Athabasca River	
Whitecourt		366.5	227.7	Highway 32 south – Edson	East end of Highway 32 concurrency
Whitecourt		366.8	227.9	Crosses the McLeod River	
Whitecourt		367.6	228.4	51 Street	
Whitecourt		369.4	229.5	Dahl Drive / Pine Road	
Woodlands County		389.1	241.8	Highway 751 south – MacKay	
Woodlands County		391.6	243.3	Highway 658 north – Fort Assiniboine	
Lac Ste. Anne County	Green Court	401.9	249.7	Highway 18 east – Barrhead	
Lac Ste. Anne County	Mayerthorpe	411.5	255.7	Highway 22 (Cowboy Trail) – Evansburg, Entwistle	
Lac Ste. Anne County	Rochfort Bridge	418.9	260.3	UAR 68 north	
Lac Ste. Anne County		427.1	265.4	Highway 757 north	West end of Highway 757 concurrency
Lac Ste. Anne County		428.8	266.4	Crosses the Pembina River	
Lac Ste. Anne County	Sangudo	429.5	266.9	Highway 757 south – Gainford	East end of Highway 757 concurrency
Lac Ste. Anne County	Cherhill	446.4	277.4	Highway 764 north	
Lac Ste. Anne County		451.9	280.8	Highway 765 south – Darwell	
Lac Ste. Anne County	Gunn	470.4	292.3	Range Road 32 (St. Anne Trail) – Alberta Beach	
Lac Ste. Anne County	Gunn	471.3	292.9	Highway 33 north (Grizzly Trail) – Barrhead, Swan Hills	
Lac Ste. Anne County		477.4	296.6	Highway 37 east – Fort Saskatchewan	
Lac Ste. Anne County	Onoway	480.7	298.7	UAR 84 east (Lac St. Anne Trail)	Partially grade sperated
Lac Ste. Anne County		485.3	301.6	Highway 633 – Alberta Beach	Former Highway 33 west
Parkland County	Manly Corner	495.0	307.6	Highway 16 (TCH/YH) (Yellowhead Highway) – Edmonton, Edson, Jasper	Interchange; Highway 16 exit 340; CANAMEX Corridor follows Highway 16 east
Parkland County	Manly Corner	495.0	307.6	To Highway 770 south – Carvel, Genesee	Southbound exit only; full access via Highway 16 west
1.000 mi = 1.609 km; 1.000 km = 0.621 mi: Concurrency terminus; Incomplete access; Route transition

== See also ==
- Alaska Highway
- Pan-American Highway
- Transportation in Grande Prairie
