= Darwell, Alberta =

Coordinates: 53°40′14″N 114°35′32″W

Location of Darwell Alberta

Darwell is a hamlet in central Alberta, Canada that is under the jurisdiction of Lac Ste. Anne County. It is 10 kilometres (6.2 mi) north of Highway 16, 74 kilometres (46 mi) northwest of Edmonton.

== History ==
Darwell is located on the old Yellowhead Trail fur trade route, which ran from Lac Ste Anne to Jasper. The Canadian Northern Railway was built through Darwell, roughly following the Yellowhead Trail. A railway station opened in 1912. Darwell was the site of a consolidated school which opened in 1947 to serve students who previously attended eight one-roomed schools in the area. That school burned in 1954, and a modern school was built. When the tracks were torn up in the mid-1930's, the railway bed became a road, now Highway 633.

== Government ==
Darwell is located in the provincial riding of Lac Ste. Anne - Parkland and the Yellowhead electoral district (federal).

== Infrastructure ==
- Darwell Community Hall
- Darwell Public Library (member of the Yellowhead Regional Library)
- Darwell School, which offers education from kindergarten to grade 7

== Notable people ==
Campbell, Bettie Jean (June 18, 1933 - January 12, 2023) (painter)

Carlier, Oneil (June 22, 1962 -) (politician) Member of the Legislative Assembly (29th Legislative Assembly 2015 - 2019). Carlier was elected in the 2015 Alberta general election, as the member representing the electoral district of Whitecourt-Ste. Anne and served as Minister of Agriculture and Forestry. Minister Carlier served until April, 2019.

Kinsella, William Patrick (WP) - (May 25, 1935 - September 16, 2016) - (Canadian writer/author) lived on a farm near Darwell until age 10.

== See also ==
- List of communities in Alberta
