= Sunset Point, Alberta =

Sunset Point
- Summer village
- Summer Village of Sunset Point
- Location of Sunset Point in Alberta
- Coordinates: 53.69242°N 114.34712°W
- Country: Canada
- Province: Alberta
- Census division: No. 13

Government
  - Type: Municipal incorporation
  - Mayor: Lee Landsperg
  - Governing body: Sunset Point Summer Village Council

Area (2021)
  - Land: 1.17 km^{2} (0.45 sq mi)

Population (2021)
  - Total: 257
  - Density: 220/km^{2} (570/sq mi)
- Time zone: UTC−06:00 (Alberta Time)
- Website: Official website

Sunset Point is a summer village in Alberta, Canada. It is located on the eastern shore of Lac Ste. Anne and north of Alberta Beach.

== Demographics ==
In the 2021 Census of Population conducted by Statistics Canada, the Summer Village of Sunset Point had a population of 257 living in 110 of its 336 total private dwellings, a change of 52.1% from its 2016 population of 169. With a land area of 1.17 km^{2} (0.45 sq mi), it had a population density of 219.7/km^{2} (568.9/sq mi) in 2021.

In the 2016 Census of Population conducted by Statistics Canada, the Summer Village of Sunset Point had a population of 169 living in 74 of its 337 total private dwellings, a −23.5% change from its 2011 population of 221. With a land area of 1.15 km^{2} (0.44 sq mi), it had a population density of 147.0/km^{2} (380.6/sq mi) in 2016.

== See also ==
- List of communities in Alberta
- List of summer villages in Alberta
- List of resort villages in Saskatchewan
