= Division No. 13, Alberta =

Census division in Canada

Coordinates: 54°42′56″N 113°15′13″W

Division No. 13
- Census division in Alberta
- Country: Canada
- Province: Alberta

Area
  - Total: 24,374 km^{2} (9,411 sq mi)

Population (2021)
  - Total: 68,076
  - Density: 2.7930/km^{2} (7.2338/sq mi)

Division No. 13 is a census division in Alberta, Canada. The majority of the division is located in the north-central portion of central Alberta, while the northeast portion of the division is located within northern Alberta. The division's largest urban community is the Town of Whitecourt.

== Census subdivisions ==
The following census subdivisions (municipalities or municipal equivalents) are located within Alberta's Division No. 13.

- Towns
  - Athabasca
  - Barrhead
  - Mayerthorpe
  - Onoway
  - Westlock
  - Whitecourt
- Villages
  - Alberta Beach
  - Boyle
  - Clyde
- Summer villages
  - Birch Cove
  - Bondiss
  - Castle Island
  - Island Lake
  - Island Lake South
  - Larkspur
  - Mewatha Beach
  - Nakamun Park
  - Ross Haven
  - Sandy Beach
  - Silver Sands
  - South Baptiste
  - South View
  - Sunrise Beach
  - Sunset Beach
  - Sunset Point
  - Val Quentin
  - West Baptiste
  - West Cove
  - Whispering Hills
  - Yellowstone
- Municipal districts
  - Athabasca County
  - Barrhead No. 11, County of
  - Lac Ste. Anne County
  - Thorhild County
  - Westlock County
  - Woodlands County
- Indian reserves
  - Alexis 133

== Demographics ==
Historical population
Year	Pop.	±%
1991	58,102	—
1996	62,569	+7.7%
2001	63,954	+2.2%
2006	66,972	+4.7%
2011	68,919	+2.9%
2016	71,016	+3.0%
2021	68,076	−4.1%

In the 2021 Census of Population conducted by Statistics Canada, Division No. 13 had a population of 68,076 living in 27,482 of its 34,696 total private dwellings, a change of −4.1% from its 2016 population of 71,016. With a land area of 24,308.74 km^{2} (9,385.66 sq mi), it had a population density of 2.8/km^{2} (7.3/sq mi) in 2021.

== See also ==
- List of census divisions of Alberta
- List of communities in Alberta
