= Larkspur, Alberta =

Larkspur
- Summer village
- Summer Village of Larkspur
- Location of Larkspur in Alberta
- Coordinates: 54.44080°N 113.77025°W
- Country: Canada
- Province: Alberta
- Census division: No. 13

Government
  - Type: Municipal incorporation
  - Mayor: Gerald Keane
  - Governing body: Larkspur Summer Village Council

Area (2021)
  - Land: 0.26 km^{2} (0.10 sq mi)

Population (2021)
  - Total: 53
  - Density: 206.4/km^{2} (535/sq mi)
- Time zone: UTC−06:00 (Alberta Time)
- Website: www.svlarkspur.ca

Larkspur is a summer village in Alberta, Canada. It is located north of Westlock and south of Athabasca, east of Highway 44 and west of Highway 2.

== Demographics ==
In the 2021 Census of Population conducted by Statistics Canada, the Summer Village of Larkspur had a population of 53 living in 25 of its 78 total private dwellings, a change of 20.5% from its 2016 population of 44. With a land area of 0.26 km^{2} (0.10 sq mi), it had a population density of 203.8/km^{2} (528.0/sq mi) in 2021.

In the 2016 Census of Population conducted by Statistics Canada, the Summer Village of Larkspur had a population of 44 living in 23 of its 89 total private dwellings, a 15.8% change from its 2011 population of 38. With a land area of 0.26 km^{2} (0.10 sq mi), it had a population density of 169.2/km^{2} (438.3/sq mi) in 2016.

== See also ==
- List of communities in Alberta
- List of summer villages in Alberta
- List of resort villages in Saskatchewan
