= Sunrise Beach, Alberta =

Sunrise Beach
- Summer village
- Summer Village of Sunrise Beach
- Location of Sunrise Beach in Alberta
- Coordinates: 53.08032°N 114.10302°W
- Country: Canada
- Province: Alberta
- Census division: No. 13

Government
  - Type: Municipal incorporation
  - Mayor: Jon Ethier
  - Governing body: Sunrise Beach Summer Village Council

Area (2021)
  - Land: 1.66 km^{2} (0.64 sq mi)

Population (2021)
  - Total: 153
  - Density: 92/km^{2} (240/sq mi)
- Time zone: UTC−06:00 (Alberta Time)
- Website: www.summervillageofsunrisebeach.ca

Sunrise Beach is a summer village in Alberta, Canada. It is located on the western shore of Sandy Lake, south of Sandy Beach.

== Demographics ==
In the 2021 Census of Population conducted by Statistics Canada, the Summer Village of Sunrise Beach had a population of 153 living in 86 of its 139 total private dwellings, a change of 13.3% from its 2016 population of 135. With a land area of 1.66 km^{2} (0.64 sq mi), it had a population density of 92.2/km^{2} (238.7/sq mi) in 2021.

In the 2016 Census of Population conducted by Statistics Canada, the Summer Village of Sunrise Beach had a population of 135 living in 69 of its 139 total private dwellings, a −9.4% change from its 2011 population of 149. With a land area of 1.66 km^{2} (0.64 sq mi), it had a population density of 81.3/km^{2} (210.6/sq mi) in 2016.

== See also ==
- List of communities in Alberta
- List of francophone communities in Alberta
- List of summer villages in Alberta
- List of resort villages in Saskatchewan
