= Alexis 133 =

Coordinates: 53°44′57″N 114°31′22″W

- Indian reserve
- Alexis Indian Reserve No. 133
- Boundaries of Alexis 133

- Location in Alberta
- First Nation: Alexis Nakota Sioux
- Treaty: 6
- Country: Canada
- Province: Alberta
- Municipal district: Lac Ste. Anne

Area
  - Total: 6,175.2 ha (15,259 acres)

Population (2016)
  - Total: 755
  - Density: 12.2/km^{2} (31.7/sq mi)
- Time zone: UTC−06:00 (Alberta Time)

Alexis 133 is an Indian reserve of the Alexis Nakota Sioux First Nation in Alberta, located within Lac Ste. Anne County. It is 70 kilometres northwest of Edmonton. In the 2016 Canadian Census, it recorded a population of 755 living in 173 of its 209 total private dwellings.

The reserve has the name of Alexis, a tribal leader.
