= Birch Cove =

- Summer village
- Summer Village of Birch Cove
- Location of Birch Cove in Alberta
- Coordinates: 53°56′55″N 114°21′49″W
- Country: Canada
- Province: Alberta
- Census division: No. 13

Government
  - Type: Municipal incorporation
  - Mayor: Dean Preston
  - Governing body: Birch Cove Summer Village Council

Area (2021)
  - Land: 0.29 km^{2} (0.11 sq mi)

Population (2021)
  - Total: 67
  - Density: 232.2/km^{2} (601/sq mi)
- Time zone: UTC−06:00 (Alberta Time)
- Website: www.birchcove.ca

Birch Cove is a summer village in Alberta, Canada. It is located between Highway 33 and Lac la Nonne, 99 kilometres (62 mi) northwest of Edmonton.

== Demographics ==
In the 2021 Census of Population conducted by Statistics Canada, the Summer Village of Birch Cove had a population of 67 living in 27 of its 61 total private dwellings, a change of 48.9% from its 2016 population of 45. With a land area of 0.29 km^{2} (0.11 sq mi), it had a population density of 231.0/km^{2} (598.4/sq mi) in 2021.

In the 2016 Census of Population conducted by Statistics Canada, the Summer Village of Birch Cove had a population of 45 living in 20 of its 74 total private dwellings, which represents no change from its 2011 population of 45. With a land area of 0.3 km^{2} (0.12 sq mi), it had a population density of 150.0/km^{2} (388.5/sq mi) in 2016.

== See also ==
- List of communities in Alberta
- List of summer villages in Alberta
- List of resort villages in Saskatchewan
