= Ross Haven =

- Summer village
- Summer Village of Ross Haven
- Location of Ross Haven in Alberta
- Coordinates: 53.73349°N 114.4045°W
- Country: Canada
- Province: Alberta
- Census division: No. 13

Government
  - Type: Municipal incorporation
  - Mayor: Ray Hutscal
  - Governing body: Ross Haven Summer Village Council

Area (2021)
  - Land: 0.7 km^{2} (0.27 sq mi)

Population (2021)
  - Total: 126
  - Density: 179.9/km^{2} (466/sq mi)
- Time zone: UTC−06:00 (Alberta Time)
- Website: Official website

Ross Haven is a summer village in Alberta, Canada. It is located on the northern shore of Lac Ste. Anne, south of Highway 43.

== Demographics ==
In the 2021 Census of Population conducted by Statistics Canada, the Summer Village of Ross Haven had a population of 126 living in 60 of its 212 total private dwellings, a change of −21.3% from its 2016 population of 160. With a land area of 0.7 km^{2} (0.27 sq mi), it had a population density of 180.0/km^{2} (466.2/sq mi) in 2021.

In the 2016 Census of Population conducted by Statistics Canada, the Summer Village of Ross Haven had a population of 160 living in 64 of its 215 total private dwellings, a 16.8% change from its 2011 population of 137. With a land area of 0.71 km^{2} (0.27 sq mi), it had a population density of 225.4/km^{2} (583.7/sq mi) in 2016.

== See also ==
- List of communities in Alberta
- List of summer villages in Alberta
- List of resort villages in Saskatchewan
