= Nakamun Park =

- Summer village
- Summer Village of Nakamun Park
- Location of Nakamun Park in Alberta
- Coordinates: 53.88026°N 114.21661°W
- Country: Canada
- Province: Alberta
- Census division: No. 13

Government
  - Type: Municipal incorporation
  - Mayor: Marge Hanssen
  - Governing body: Nakamun Park Summer Village Council

Area (2021)
  - Land: 0.43 km^{2} (0.17 sq mi)

Population (2021)
  - Total: 78
  - Density: 181.6/km^{2} (470/sq mi)
- Time zone: UTC−06:00 (Alberta Time)
- Website: Official website

Nakamun Park is a summer village in Alberta, Canada. It is located on the southern shore of Nakamun Lake, west of Highway 33 and north of Onoway.

== Demographics ==
In the 2021 Census of Population conducted by Statistics Canada, the Summer Village of Nakamun Park had a population of 78 living in 39 of its 151 total private dwellings, a change of −18.8% from its 2016 population of 96. With a land area of 0.43 km^{2} (0.17 sq mi), it had a population density of 181.4/km^{2} (469.8/sq mi) in 2021.

In the 2016 Census of Population conducted by Statistics Canada, the Summer Village of Nakamun Park had a population of 96 living in 45 of its 148 total private dwellings, a 166.7% change from its 2011 population of 36. With a land area of 0.45 km^{2} (0.17 sq mi), it had a population density of 213.3/km^{2} (552.5/sq mi) in 2016.

== See also ==
- List of communities in Alberta
- List of summer villages in Alberta
- List of resort villages in Saskatchewan
