= West Cove =

- Summer village
- Summer Village of West Cove
- Location of West Cove in Alberta
- Coordinates: 53.70121°N 114.49741°W
- Country: Canada
- Province: Alberta
- Census division: No. 13

Government
  - Type: Municipal incorporation
  - Mayor: Ren Giesbrecht
  - Governing body: West Cove Summer Village Council

Area (2021)
  - Land: 1.3 km^{2} (0.50 sq mi)

Population (2021)
  - Total: 222
  - Density: 171.2/km^{2} (443/sq mi)
- Time zone: UTC−06:00 (Alberta Time)
- Website: Official website

West Cove is a summer village in Alberta, Canada. It is located on the southern shore of Lac Ste. Anne.

== Demographics ==
In the 2021 Census of Population conducted by Statistics Canada, the Summer Village of West Cove had a population of 222 living in 108 of its 238 total private dwellings, a change of 49% from its 2016 population of 149. With a land area of 1.3 km^{2} (0.50 sq mi), it had a population density of 170.8/km^{2} (442.3/sq mi) in 2021.

In the 2016 Census of Population conducted by Statistics Canada, the Summer Village of West Cove had a population of 149 living in 78 of its 214 total private dwellings, a 23.1% change from its 2011 population of 121. With a land area of 1.33 km^{2} (0.51 sq mi), it had a population density of 112.0/km^{2} (290.2/sq mi) in 2016.

== See also ==
- List of communities in Alberta
- List of summer villages in Alberta
- List of resort villages in Saskatchewan
