= Val Quentin =

- Summer village
- Summer Village of Val Quentin
- Location of Val Quentin in Alberta
- Coordinates: 53.66924°N 114.37815°W
- Country: Canada
- Province: Alberta
- Census division: No. 13

Government
  - Type: Municipal incorporation
  - Mayor: Bob Lehman
  - Governing body: Val Quentin Summer Village Council

Area (2021)
  - Land: 0.29 km^{2} (0.11 sq mi)

Population (2021)
  - Total: 158
  - Density: 554.2/km^{2} (1,435/sq mi)
- Time zone: UTC−06:00 (Alberta Time)
- Website: Official website

Val Quentin is a summer village in Alberta, Canada. It is located on the southern shore of Lac Ste. Anne.

== Demographics ==
In the 2021 Census of Population conducted by Statistics Canada, the Summer Village of Val Quentin had a population of 158 living in 74 of its 160 total private dwellings, a change of −37.3% from its 2016 population of 252. With a land area of 0.29 km^{2} (0.11 sq mi), it had a population density of 544.8/km^{2} (1,411.1/sq mi) in 2021.

In the 2016 Census of Population conducted by Statistics Canada, the Summer Village of Val Quentin had a population of 252 living in 128 of its 224 total private dwellings, a 60.5% change from its 2011 population of 157. With a land area of 0.31 km^{2} (0.12 sq mi), it had a population density of 812.9/km^{2} (2,105.4/sq mi) in 2016.

== See also ==
- List of communities in Alberta
- List of summer villages in Alberta
- List of resort villages in Saskatchewan
