= Castle Island, Alberta =

Castle Island
- Summer village
- Summer Village of Castle Island
- Location of Castle Island in Alberta
- Coordinates: 53.70803°N 114.34066°W
- Country: Canada
- Province: Alberta
- Census division: No. 13

Government
  - Type: Municipal incorporation
  - Mayor: Ian Kupchenko
  - Governing body: Castle Island Summer Village Council

Area (2021)
  - Land: 0.05 km^{2} (0.019 sq mi)

Population (2021)
  - Total: 15
  - Density: 278.8/km^{2} (722/sq mi)
- Time zone: UTC−06:00 (Alberta Time)
- Website: summervillageofcastleisland.com

Castle Island is a summer village in Alberta, Canada. It is located on a small island on Lac Ste. Anne, close to the mouth of the Sturgeon River.

== History ==
Originally known as "Constance Island", this island was the site chosen by Indian Agent, Charles de Caze, for an impressive summer home. The island later became known as "Castle Island".

== Demographics ==
In the 2021 Census of Population conducted by Statistics Canada, the Summer Village of Castle Island had a population of 15 living in 9 of its 18 total private dwellings, a change of 50% from its 2016 population of 10. With a land area of 0.05 km^{2} (0.019 sq mi), it had a population density of 300.0/km^{2} (777.0/sq mi) in 2021.

In the 2016 Census of Population conducted by Statistics Canada, the Summer Village of Castle Island had a population of 10 living in 7 of its 19 total private dwellings, a −47.4% change from its 2011 population of 19. With a land area of 0.05 km^{2} (0.019 sq mi), it had a population density of 200.0/km^{2} (518.0/sq mi) in 2016.

== See also ==
- List of communities in Alberta
- List of summer villages in Alberta
- List of resort villages in Saskatchewan
- Lac Ste. Anne (Alberta)
