= Alberta Beach =

- Village
- Village boundaries

- Location in Lac Ste. Anne County Location in Alberta
- Coordinates: 53°40′36″N 114°21′00″W
- Country: Canada
- Province: Alberta
- Region: Central Alberta
- Municipal district: Lac Ste. Anne County
- Incorporated
  - Summer village: August 23, 1920
  - Village: January 1, 1999

Government
  - Mayor: Kelly Muir
  - Governing body: Alberta Beach Village Council

Area (2021)
  - Land: 2.02 km^{2} (0.78 sq mi)
- Elevation: 740 m (2,430 ft)

Population (2021)
  - Total: 864
  - Density: 427.7/km^{2} (1,108/sq mi)
- Time zone: UTC−06:00 (Alberta Time)
- Highways: Highway 33; Highway 43
- Waterway: Lac Ste. Anne
- Website: Official website

Alberta Beach is a village in central Alberta, Canada, west of Edmonton. It is located on the southeast shore of Lac Ste. Anne, approximately 8 km (5.0 mi) west of Highway 43 and 2 km (1.2 mi) north of Highway 633.

Alberta Beach's economy is centred on tourism and recreation. The village is the site of the Lac Ste. Anne Pilgrimage, an event having key significance to Aboriginal people, including Cree, Dene, Blackfoot and Métis Roman Catholics. It is also notable as being one of Edmonton, Alberta's main cottage weekend retreats.

Alberta Beach is the only urban municipality (city, town, village, and summer village) in Alberta that does not include its municipal status in its official legal name. Its official name is simply Alberta Beach instead of Village of Alberta Beach like the convention used by other urban municipalities. Alberta Beach changed from this convention at the time it changed its municipal status from summer village to village on January 1, 1999.

== History ==
In 1912 the Canadian Northern Railway built its Edmonton–Vancouver line through what is now Alberta Beach. It brought its employees out for company picnics and holidays. By 1920 the area had incorporated as a summer village, built a dance pavilion, a large wooden pier, and several cabins. Other companies such as Marshall Wells and Woodward's then began to bring their employees out for the same relaxing and beautiful atmosphere.

There was such a demand for this atmosphere that the Moonlight Express was started. The railway picked people up in Edmonton on Saturday mornings, took them to Alberta Beach, then picked them up Sunday night to take them back to Edmonton.

Soon people began purchasing and building their own cabins and small businesses. On January 1, 1999, the summer village of Alberta Beach became a village. It now has 884 year-round residents and can swell to over 3,000 people during long weekends. A hotel and many small businesses operate within the village.

== Demographics ==
In the 2021 Census of Population conducted by Statistics Canada, Alberta Beach had a population of 864 living in 417 of its 743 total private dwellings, a change of −15.1% from its 2016 population of 1,018. With a land area of 2.02 km^{2} (0.78 sq mi), it had a population density of 427.7/km^{2} (1,107.8/sq mi) in 2021.

In the 2016 Census of Population conducted by Statistics Canada, Alberta Beach recorded a population of 1,018 living in 479 of its 743 total private dwellings, a 17.7% change from its 2011 population of 865. With a land area of 2.01 km^{2} (0.78 sq mi), it had a population density of 506.5/km^{2} (1,311.7/sq mi) in 2016.

== See also ==
- List of communities in Alberta
- List of villages in Alberta
- Royal eponyms in Canada
