= Silver Sands, Alberta =

Silver Sands
- Summer village
- Summer Village of Silver Sands
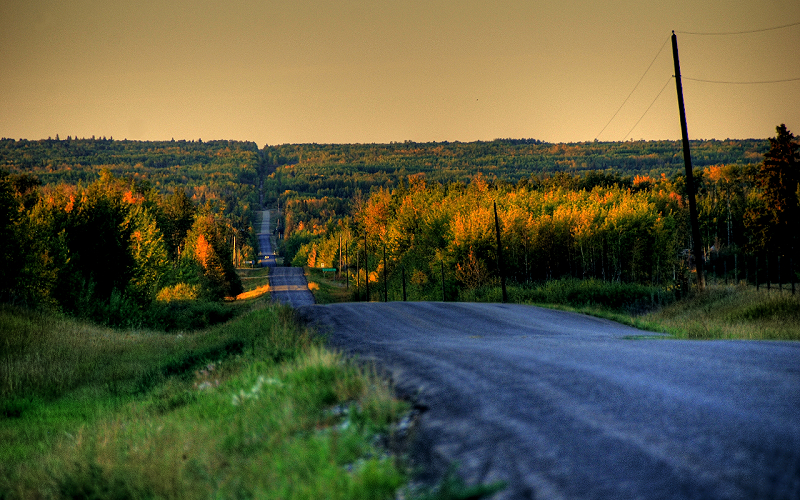
- Range Road 52 at Silver Sands

- Location of Silver Sands in Alberta
- Coordinates: 53.63783°N 114.65529°W
- Country: Canada
- Province: Alberta
- Census division: No. 13

Government
  - Type: Municipal incorporation
  - Mayor: Bernie Poulin
  - Governing body: Silver Sands Summer Village Council

Area (2021)
  - Land: 2.51 km^{2} (0.97 sq mi)

Population (2021)
  - Total: 214
  - Density: 85.2/km^{2} (221/sq mi)
- Time zone: UTC−06:00 (Alberta Time)
- Website: Official website

Silver Sands is a summer village in Alberta, Canada. The summer village is located on the shores of Isle Lake. Silver Sands was founded on January 1, 1969.

== Demographics ==
In the 2021 Census of Population conducted by Statistics Canada, the Summer Village of Silver Sands had a population of 214 living in 109 of its 234 total private dwellings, a change of 33.8% from its 2016 population of 160. With a land area of 2.51 km^{2} (0.97 sq mi), it had a population density of 85.3/km^{2} (220.8/sq mi) in 2021.

In the 2016 Census of Population conducted by Statistics Canada, the Summer Village of Silver Sands had a population of 160 living in 79 of its 165 total private dwellings, a change of 88.2% from its 2011 population of 85. With a land area of 2.41 km^{2} (0.93 sq mi), it had a population density of 66.4/km^{2} (171.9/sq mi) in 2016.

The Summer Village of Silver Sands' 2012 municipal census counted a population of 154.

== Attractions ==
The main attraction of this summer village is the Silver Sands golf and country club. Some other attractions are a playground and a horseshoe pit.

== 2021 Election ==
On June 12, 2021, the Silver Sands General Election concluded. There were three vacancies in the council, councillor, mayor and deputy mayor. In this election only three candidates ran, therefore under section 34 of the Local Authorities Election Act governing municipal elections in the province of Alberta. By acclamation the three candidates won.

== 2025 Election ==
On July 26, 2025, the Silver Sands General Election concluded. There were three vacancies with five total candidates. Both Graeme Horn and Bernie Poulin were reelected, receiving 100 and 92 out of the total 146 votes respectively. While Sherry Strong was voted in for the first time receiving 92 out of the total 146 votes. Robert Kirk and Richard Wagner were defeated in this election receiving 35 and 70 out of the total 146 votes respectively. 1 ballot was a spoilt vote. Candidates will be municipal councilors until 2029.

== See also ==
- List of communities in Alberta
- List of francophone communities in Alberta
- List of summer villages in Alberta
- List of resort villages in Saskatchewan
