= Sandy Beach, Alberta =

Sandy Beach
- Summer village
- Summer Village of Sandy Beach
- Location of Sandy Beach in Alberta
- Coordinates: 53.79790°N 114.03744°W
- Country: Canada
- Province: Alberta
- Census division: No. 11

Government
  - Type: Municipal incorporation
  - Mayor: Michael Harney
  - Governing body: Sandy Beach Summer Village Council

Area (2021)
  - Land: 2.41 km^{2} (0.93 sq mi)

Population (2021)
  - Total: 278
  - Density: 115.4/km^{2} (299/sq mi)
- Time zone: UTC−06:00 (Alberta Time)
- Website: Official website

Sandy Beach is a summer village in Alberta, Canada. It is located on Sandy Lake, northwest from Edmonton along Highway 642.

== Demographics ==
In the 2021 Census of Population conducted by Statistics Canada, the Summer Village of Sandy Beach had a population of 278 living in 139 of its 258 total private dwellings, a change of 0% from its 2016 population of 278. With a land area of 2.41 km^{2} (0.93 sq mi), it had a population density of 115.4/km^{2} (298.8/sq mi) in 2021.

In the 2016 Census of Population conducted by Statistics Canada, the Summer Village of Sandy Beach had a population of 278 living in 126 of its 264 total private dwellings, a 24.7% change from its 2011 population of 223. With a land area of 2.4 km^{2} (0.93 sq mi), it had a population density of 115.8/km^{2} (300.0/sq mi) in 2016.

== See also ==
- List of communities in Alberta
- List of summer villages in Alberta
- List of resort villages in Saskatchewan
