= Alberta Highway 49 =

Highway in Alberta

Highway 49
- Highway 49 highlighted in red

Route information
- Maintained by the Ministry of Transportation and Economic Corridors
- Length: 265.9 km (165.2 mi)

Major junctions
- West end: Highway 49 at British Columbia border
- Highway 2 in Rycroft; Highway 2 in Donnelly; Highway 2A in Guy
- South end: Highway 43 in Valleyview

Location
- Country: Canada
- Province: Alberta
- Specialized and rural municipalities: Saddle Hills County, Spirit River No. 133 M.D., Birch Hills County, Smoky River No. 130 M.D., Greenview No. 16 M.D.
- Towns: Spirit River, Falher, Valleyview
- Villages: Rycroft, Donnelly

Highway system
- Alberta Numbered Highway Network; List; Former
← Highway 47	→ Highway 50

Alberta Provincial Highway No. 49, commonly referred to as Highway 49, is a highway in northwestern Alberta, Canada. It runs east–west from the British Columbia border to Donnelly, and then north–south to Valleyview. Highway 49 has a total length of 266 kilometres (165 mi).

The portion of Highway 49 from Donnelly to the British Columbia is also known as the Spirit River Highway. It also comprises the westernmost segment of Alberta's portion of the Northern Woods and Water Route. After Donnelly, the Northern Woods and Water Route continues eastward along Highway 2 and then Highway 55. Its southernmost section, between Highway 2 and Highway 43, is part of Alberta's Arctic Corridor and is designated as a core route of Canada's National Highway System.

== Route description ==
Highway 49 begins at the Alberta/British Columbia border (where it continues as British Columbia Highway 49 to the City of Dawson Creek) 8 km (5.0 mi) west of the locality of Bay Tree and is part of the Northern Woods and Water Route. The highway passes through Bay Tree, the locality of Gordondale, the Town of Spirit River, before intersecting Highway 2 in the Village of Rycroft. The highway continues east, passing by the hamlets of Wanham, Eaglesham, Tangent, and Watino before crossing the Smoky River. The highway then passes by the Village of Girouxville and the Town of Falher before again intersecting Highway 2, approximately 2 km (1 mi) west of the Village of Donnelly.

At the Highway 2 intersection, known locally as the 'Donnelly Corner', Highway 49 turns south and becomes part of a core route of Canada's National Highway System while the Northern Woods and Water Route continues eastward along Highway 2. The highway passes Guy and New Fish Creek before entering Valleyview and terminating at an intersection with Highway 43.

== History ==
The southern and easternmost sections of Highway 49 have seen a variety of highway designations.

Prior to 1990, Highway 49 continued east past Donnelly and through the Town of McLennan before terminating at Highway 2 in Triangle, 14 km (8.7 mi) west of the Town of High Prairie, along present-day Highway 2. At the same time, its present-day alignment between Donnelly and Valleyview was designated as Highway 34.

In 1990/1991, Highway 34 between Valleyview and Donnelly was renumbered to Highway 43 and Highway 49 between Triangle and Donnelly was renumbered to Highway 2, resulting in Highway 49 terminating at the Donnelly Corner.

Finally, on March 1, 1998, Highway 43 between Valleyview and Donnelly was renumbered to Highway 49 to allow for Highway 43 to travel west from Valleyview to Grande Prairie and the British Columbia border.

== Future ==
Alberta Transportation is conducting planning studies for upgrades along the Highway 2/49 corridor between Peace River and Valleyview, which includes twinning the portion of Highway 49 south of Donnelly and constructing a bypass around Valleyview. There is no timeline for construction.

== Major intersections ==
Rural/specialized municipality	Location	km	mi	Destinations	Notes
Saddle Hills County		0.0	0.0	Highway 49 west (NWWR) – Dawson Creek	Continues into British Columbia
Saddle Hills County		13.2	8.2	Highway 719 north – Bonanza	
Saddle Hills County		52.4	32.6	Highway 725 north – Blueberry Mountain	
↑ / ↓		68.6	42.6	Highway 727 north	
M.D. of Spirit River No. 133	Spirit River	78.2	48.6	Highway 731 south	
M.D. of Spirit River No. 133	Rycroft	88.4	54.9	Highway 2 – Grande Prairie, Fairview, Peace River	Northern Woods and Water Route follows Highway 2 north
Birch Hills County	Wanham	108.7	67.5	Highway 733 south – Bezanson	
Birch Hills County		140.7	87.4	Highway 739 north – Eaglesham	
Birch Hills County		153.6	95.4	Highway 740 north – Tangent	
↑ / ↓	Watino	157.1	97.6	Crosses the Smoky River	
M.D. of Smoky River No. 130		176.5	109.7	Highway 744 north – Girouxville	
M.D. of Smoky River No. 130	Falher	185.0	115.0		
M.D. of Smoky River No. 130	Donnelly	189.4	117.7	Highway 2 (NWWR) – Peace River, McLennan, Edmonton	Directional signage changes from east/west to north/south; north end of Arctic Corridor
M.D. of Smoky River No. 130		202.4	125.8	Highway 679 east – Kathleen	
M.D. of Smoky River No. 130		208.8	129.7	UAR 212 east – Guy	
M.D. of Smoky River No. 130		218.5	135.8	Highway 2A east – High Prairie, Edmonton	
M.D. of Smoky River No. 130		220.3	136.9	Crosses the Little Smoky River	
M.D. of Smoky River No. 130		226.5	140.7	Highway 676 west	
M.D. of Greenview No. 16		254.6	158.2	Township Road 713A	Former Highway 34A north
M.D. of Greenview No. 16		262.7	163.2	Highway 669 east – Sunset House	
M.D. of Greenview No. 16	Valleyview	265.9	165.2	Highway 43 – Whitecourt, Edmonton, Grande Prairie	Former Highway 34 west; south end of Arctic Corridor
1.000 mi = 1.609 km; 1.000 km = 0.621 mi: Route transition

== See also ==
- List of Alberta provincial highways
