= Alberta Highway 34 =

Highway in Alberta, Canada

Highway 34

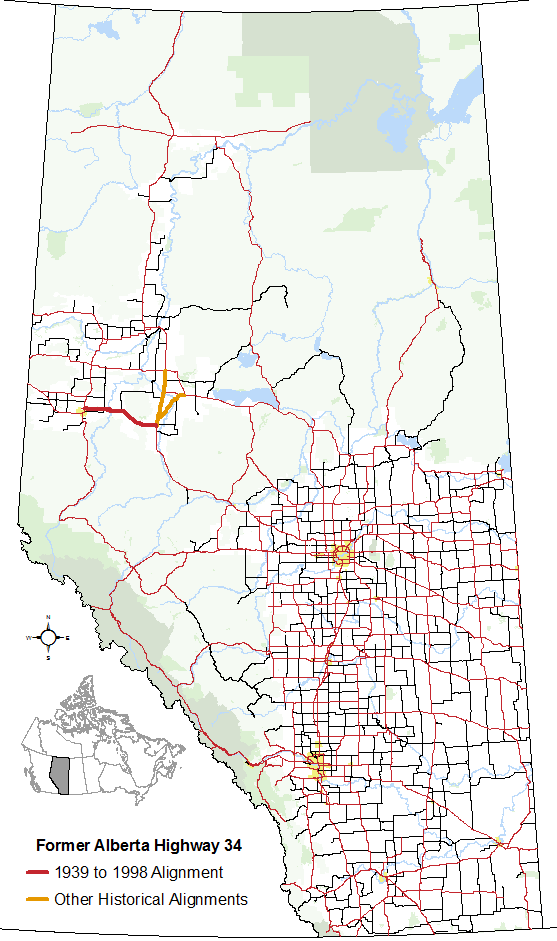
- Former Alberta Highway 34

Route information
- Maintained by the Ministry of Transportation and Economic Corridors
- Length: 105 km (65 mi)
- Existed: Late 1930s–March 1, 1998

Major junctions
- West end: Highway 2 north of Grande Prairie
- East end: Highway 49 in Valleyview

Location
- Country: Canada
- Province: Alberta
- Specialized and rural municipalities: County of Grande Prairie No. 1, Municipal District of Greenview No. 16
- Towns: Valleyview

Highway system
- Alberta Provincial Highway Network; List; Former
- CANAMEX Corridor

Alberta Provincial Highway No. 34, also known as Highway 34, was a highway in northwest Alberta, Canada, that existed in various configurations from the mid-1930s to the late 1990s. It was originally established in the 1930s as a 172-kilometre (107 mi) east–west alternative highway to Highway 2 (then Highway 1) from north of Grande Prairie to Triangle, west of High Prairie, through the southern Peace Country via Valleyview. After a number of realignments affecting the east segment of the highway in the late 1950s through mid-1960s and a shortening in the early 1990s due to highway renumbering, Highway 34 spent its final years as a 105-kilometre (65 mi) highway between Highway 2 north of Grande Prairie to Valleyview before being renumbered as Highway 43 on March 1, 1998.

== History ==
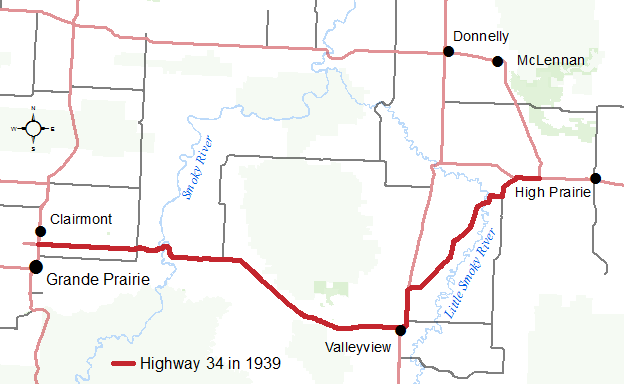
Alignment of former Highway 34 between 1939 and 1958

Highway 34 was originally established as a 172-kilometre (107 mi) unnumbered graded road in the late 1930s. It started at Highway 2 (then numbered Highway 1) 6.4 km (4.0 mi) north of Grande Prairie and 4.8 km (3.0 mi) south of Clairmont. It crossed the Smoky River via ferry 34 km (21 mi) east of its starting point and continued another 77 km (48 mi) eastward to reach Valleyview. At Valleyview, the road turned north and then northeast for 61 km (38 mi) crossing the Little Smoky River before reconnecting with Highway 2 approximately 19 km (12 mi) west of High Prairie and 34 km (21 mi) south of McLennan. The road was designated Highway 34 in 1939.

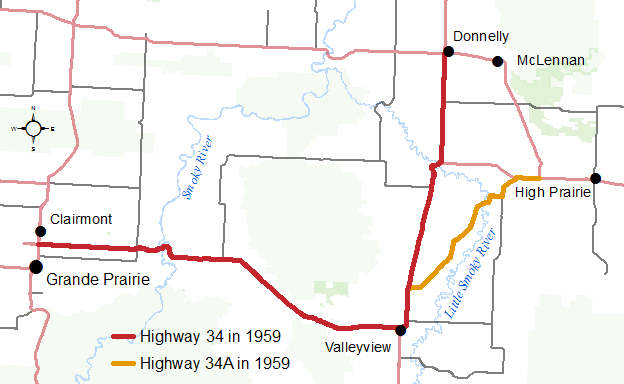
Alignments of former Highways 34 and 34A in 1959

By 1959, the western 111-kilometre (69 mi) stretch of Highway 34 provided access to numerous localities between Grande Prairie and Valleyview including Bezanson, Goodwin, Debolt, Crooked Creek, Clarkson Valley, Sturgeon Heights and Calais. The western 27 km (17 mi) to Bezanson and the eastern 45 km (28 mi) from Crooked Creek to Valleyview was paved while the remaining 35 km (22 mi) between Bezanson and Crooked Creek was graveled.

Much of the stretch of Highway 34 northeast of Valleyview was realigned in 1959. At a point 10 km (6.2 mi) north of Valleyview, Highway 34 was rerouted north for 66 km (41 mi) to the intersection of Highway 2 and Highway 49 just west of Donnelly, while the former highway alignment from north of Valleyview to Triangle was renumbered Highway 34A. The new Highway 34 alignment crossed the Little Smoky River 45 km (28 mi) north of Valleyview and passed by Guy 13 km (8.1 mi) later. The entire 76-kilometre (47 mi) stretch from Valleyview to Donnelly was graveled at that time, as was the 53 km (33 mi) segment of Highway 34A. In total, Highway 34 spanned 187 km (116 mi) in 1959.

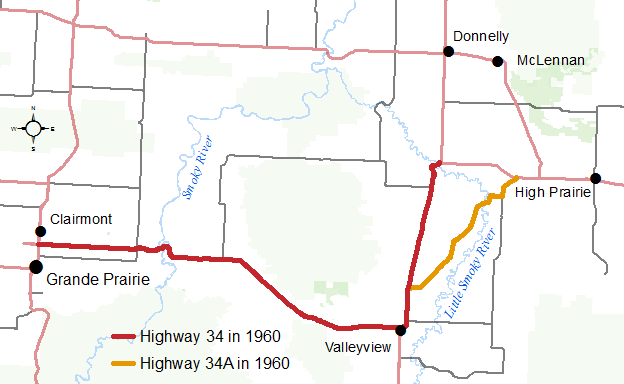
Alignments of former Highways 34 and 34A between 1960 and 1966

Within a year, the northernmost 31-kilometre (19 mi) segment of the new Highway 34 realignment was renumbered Highway 2 in 1960 from just north of the Little Smoky River to Highway 49 near Donnelly. This was due to a realignment of Highway 2 from Triangle west to meet Highway 34 just north of the Little Smoky River. The Highway 2 realignment was also responsible for the shortening of Highway 34A by 5 km (3.1 mi) as the final stretch prior to Triangle became part of Highway 2.

As a result of Highway 2 realignment in 1960, the total length of Highway 34 was reduced to 156 km (97 mi), while the length of Highway 34A was reduced to 47 km (29 mi). By this time, the entire stretch from Grande Prairie to Valleyview was paved, while the stretch from Valleyview to north of the Little Smoky River remained gravel.
