= Spirit River =

Spirit River can refer to:

- Spirit River (Alberta), a river in northern Alberta, Canada
- Spirit River, Alberta, a town in northern Alberta, Canada
  - Spirit River (electoral district), a defunct provincial electoral district in Alberta, Canada from 1940 to 1971
  - Spirit River-Fairview, a defunct provincial electoral district in Alberta, Canada from 1971 to 1986
  - Spirit River Airport, an airport in Spirit River, Alberta, Canada
- Municipal District of Spirit River No. 133, a municipal district in northern Alberta, Canada
- Spirit River Formation, a geological unit of the Western Canadian Sedimentary Basin
- Spirit River Highway, alternate name for Alberta Highway 49 and British Columbia Highway 49, part of the Northern Woods and Water Route in Western Canada
- Spirit River (Wisconsin), river in Price County, Wisconsin and Lincoln County, Wisconsin
