= Peoria, Alberta =

Peoria
- Hamlet
- Location of Peoria Peoria (Canada)
- Coordinates: 55°37′22″N 118°18′41″W
- Country: Canada
- Province: Alberta
- Region: Northern Alberta
- Census division: 19
- Municipal district: Birch Hills County
- Named for: Peoria, Illinois

Government
  - Type: Unincorporated
  - Governing body: Birch Hills County Council

Population (1986)
  - Total: 12
- Time zone: UTC−06:00 (Alberta Time)
- Area codes: 780, 587, 825

Peoria is a hamlet in northern Alberta, Canada within Birch Hills County, located 11 kilometres (6.8 mi) south of Highway 49, approximately 56 kilometres (35 mi) northeast of Grande Prairie.

== Demographics ==
Peoria recorded a population of 12 in the 1986 Census of Population conducted by Statistics Canada.

== See also ==
- List of communities in Alberta
- List of hamlets in Alberta
- List of places named Peoria
