= Watino =

- Hamlet
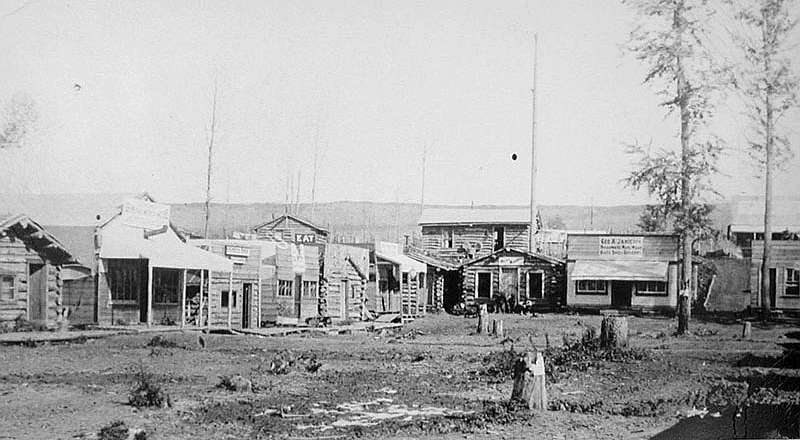
- Watino, circa 1915

- Location of Watino Watino (Canada)
- Coordinates: 55°43′09″N 117°37′02″W
- Country: Canada
- Province: Alberta
- Region: Northern Alberta
- Census division: 19
- Municipal district: Birch Hills County

Government
  - Type: Unincorporated
  - Governing body: Birch Hills County Council

Population (1991)
  - Total: 22
- Time zone: UTC−06:00 (Alberta Time)
- Area codes: 780, 587, 825

Watino is a hamlet in northern Alberta, Canada within Birch Hills County. It is located on Highway 49, approximately 96 kilometres (60 mi) northeast of Grande Prairie, and has an elevation of 385 meters (1,263 ft).

== History ==
Watino was established on the banks of the Smoky River, downstream from its confluence with the Little Smoky River. The name Watino is derived from the Cree word wâyatinâw, meaning 'valley'.

When the Edmonton, Dunvegan and British Columbia Railway began to construct a railway bridge over the Smoky River in 1915, two temporary hamlets sprang up on either side of the river. On the east bank was the main railway camp, called Pruden's Crossing, and on the west, connected by a small cable ferry, was the hamlet of Smoky River, or "Old Smoky".

The railway bridge was erected in 1916, and a railway siding situated on the west bank. It was here that Carl Donis opened the first post office, named Prudens Crossing, in 1917. The community was renamed Watino in 1921, and the post office name changed to the same in November 1925 .

Eventually Watino contained a school, two grocery stores, two hardware stores, post office, three machine agencies, garage, grain elevator, restaurant, pool hall, community hall, and skating rink . There was also a railway station, a pump station, and coal dock for the steam trains, and stockyards on the railway, from which Egg Lake Ranch shipped 13 carloads of cattle to Chicago in 1920. The railway was the main mode of transportation until 1938, when the bush trail into the community was replaced by a highway and a connecting ferry over the Smoky River. In 1950, the establishment of the Park Brothers sawmill and planer made Watino boom.

Watino declined in the 1970s and 1980s. In 1972, the Smoky River flooded, washing away much farmland in the valley, and in 1975 the grain elevator was removed. In 1987 another flood caused heavy damage to the east and west sides of the railroad bridge and forcing the closure of the CNR train system through Watino.

== Demographics ==
Population history of Watino
Year	Pop.	±%
1941	56	—
1951	126	+125.0%
1956	150	+19.0%
1961	93	−38.0%
1966	60	−35.5%
1971	68	+13.3%
1976	66	−2.9%
1981	54	−18.2%
1986	47	−13.0%
1991	22	−53.2%
Source: Statistics Canada

Watino recorded a population of 22 in the 1991 Census of Population conducted by Statistics Canada.

== See also ==
- List of communities in Alberta
- List of hamlets in Alberta
