= Jean Cote, Alberta =

Jean Cote
- Hamlet
- Location of Jean Cote Jean Cote (Canada)
- Coordinates: 55°53′53″N 117°18′38″W
- Country: Canada
- Province: Alberta
- Region: Northern Alberta
- Census division: 19
- Municipal district: Municipal District of Smoky River No. 130

Government
  - Type: Unincorporated
  - Governing body: Municipal District of Smoky River No. 130 Council

Population (1991)
  - Total: 65
- Time zone: UTC−06:00 (Alberta Time)
- Area codes: 780, 587, 825

Jean Cote, or Jean Côté, is a hamlet in northern Alberta, Canada within the Municipal District of Smoky River No. 130. It is located approximately 11 kilometres (6.8 mi) west of Highway 2 and 123 kilometres (76 mi) northeast of Grande Prairie.

== Demographics ==
Jean Cote recorded a population of 65 in the 1991 Census of Population conducted by Statistics Canada.

== See also ==
- List of communities in Alberta
- List of hamlets in Alberta
