= Little Smoky =

- Hamlet
- Location of Little Smoky in Alberta
- Coordinates: 54.7389°N 117.1797°W
- Country: Canada
- Province: Alberta
- Census division: No. 18
- Municipal district: Municipal District of Greenview No. 16

Government
  - Type: Unincorporated
  - Governing body: Municipal District of Greenview No. 16 Council

Population (1991)
  - Total: 28
- Time zone: UTC−06:00 (Alberta Time)
- Waterways: Little Smoky River, Waskahigan River, Iosegun River

Little Smoky is a hamlet in northwest Alberta, Canada within the Municipal District of Greenview No. 16. It is located on Highway 43, approximately 39 kilometres (24 mi) south of Valleyview and 47 kilometres (29 mi) northwest of Fox Creek. The hamlet is adjacent to the Little Smoky River.

== Demographics ==
Little Smoky recorded a population of 28 in the 1991 Census of Population conducted by Statistics Canada.

== Services and amenities ==
Little Smoky has a community hall, a motel, a playground, and an ice rink. The Waskahigan River Provincial Recreation Area is located across Highway 43.

== Infrastructure ==
The hamlet has two locally significant rural roads near it: Little Smoky Road (formerly Highway 745), which connects the hamlet to Highway 665, and Simonette Road, which connects to Forestry Trunk Road (formerly Highway 734).

The Little Smoky transfer station is located southwest of the hamlet on Range Road 221. The Greenview Regional Landfill was built northeast of Little Smoky on the corner of Township Road 672 and Range Road 210.

== See also ==
- List of communities in Alberta
- List of hamlets in Alberta
