= Tangent, Alberta =

Tangent
- Hamlet
- Location of Tangent Tangent (Canada)
- Coordinates: 55°47′55″N 117°40′44″W
- Country: Canada
- Province: Alberta
- Region: Northern Alberta
- Census division: 19
- Municipal district: Birch Hills County

Government
  - Type: Unincorporated
  - Governing body: Birch Hills County Council

Population (1991)
  - Total: 39
- Time zone: UTC−06:00 (Alberta Time)
- Area codes: 780, 587, 825

Tangent is a hamlet in northern Alberta, Canada within Birch Hills County, located along Alberta Highway 740, approximately 98 kilometres (61 mi) northeast of Grande Prairie. It was named by surveyors due to the formation of a tangent (straight-section) in the rail track that ran from Edmonton to Dawson Creek.

== History ==
On June 18, 1928, John Yaremko chose to settle at the current location of the hamlet, later joined by Albert Purcha and his family. The spring of 1929 brought a large group of settlers under the recruitment of Father Josephat Hamelin. In May, a general store was built, and a post office erected in the winter of that same year. Natural gas was discovered in the 1950s, opening up a new industry alongside agriculture and animal husbandry.

Today, Tangent is an agricultural community made up of mostly Franco-Albertans descended from the settlers that followed Father Hamelin, Eastern European Canadians, and Anglo-Canadians.

== Demographics ==
Population history of Tangent
Year	Pop.	±%
1941	13	—
1951	110	+746.2%
1956	92	−16.4%
1961	102	+10.9%
1966	97	−4.9%
1971	96	−1.0%
1976	87	−9.4%
1981	48	−44.8%
1986	40	−16.7%
1991	39	−2.5%
Source: Statistics Canada

Tangent recorded a population of 39 in the 1991 Census of Population conducted by Statistics Canada.

== See also ==
- List of communities in Alberta
- List of hamlets in Alberta
