= Wanham, Alberta =

Wanham
- Hamlet
- Location of Wanham Wanham (Canada) Wanham (North America)
- Coordinates: 55°44′N 118°24′W
- Country: Canada
- Province: Alberta
- Region: Northern Alberta
- Census division: 17
- Municipal district: Birch Hills County

Government
  - Type: Unincorporated
  - Governing body: Birch Hills County Council

Area (2021)
  - Land: 0.98 km^{2} (0.38 sq mi)

Population (2021)
  - Total: 141
  - Density: 143.3/km^{2} (371/sq mi)
- Time zone: UTC−06:00 (Alberta Time)
- Area codes: 780, 587, 825

Wanham (/ˈwɑːnəm/) is a hamlet in northern Alberta, Canada within Birch Hills County. It is located 29 km (18 mi) east of Rycroft along Highway 49 and approximately 106 km (66 mi) north of Grande Prairie, in the farmlands of Peace River Country. Saddle River, a tributary of Peace River, flows immediately north of the community. The origin of the name Wanham could have come from Wanham in England.

The local economy is based on agriculture and ranching, the settlement being an agricultural service centre for the surrounding farms. A wood products plant, Newpro, was previously the largest employer in the settlement. It was announced it was closing in January 2006.

== History ==
It was established in 1916 as a station on the Edmonton, Dunvegan and British Columbia Railway. The first post office was built in 1918.

It was incorporated as a village, but dissolved and merged with Birch Hills County in 1999 by Order in Council 458/99. Birch Hills County's municipal office is in Wanham.

== Demographics ==
Federal census population history
Year	Pop.	±%
1961	251	—
1966	235	−6.4%
1971	268	+14.0%
1976	225	−16.0%
1981	266	+18.2%
1986	233	−12.4%
1991	216	−7.3%
2011	127	−41.2%
2016	124	−2.4%
2021	141	+13.7%
Source: Statistics Canada

In the 2021 Census of Population conducted by Statistics Canada, Wanham had a population of 141 living in 58 of its 76 total private dwellings, a change of 13.7% from its 2016 population of 124. With a land area of 0.98 km^{2} (0.38 sq mi), it had a population density of 143.9/km^{2} (372.6/sq mi) in 2021.

As a designated place in the 2016 Census of Population conducted by Statistics Canada, Wanham had a population of 124 living in 62 of its 78 total private dwellings, a change of −2.4% from its 2011 population of 127. With a land area of 0.99 km^{2} (0.38 sq mi), it had a population density of 125.3/km^{2} (324.4/sq mi) in 2016.

== Attractions ==
A yearly plowing competition takes place in Wanham since 1971. It is currently named Alberta Provincial and Canadian Plowing Match and includes a horse drawn antique parade, live music and fashion show.

The Grizzly Bear Prairie Museum is seasonally opened in Wanham. It was founded in 1979 by a group called the Community of Cooperating Organization (COCO for short). It was officially opened in 1981.

== Climate ==
Climate data for Wanham
Month	Jan	Feb	Mar	Apr	May	Jun	Jul	Aug	Sep	Oct	Nov	Dec	Year
Record high °C (°F)	11.7 (53.1)	14.5 (58.1)	17.2 (63.0)	29.4 (84.9)	32 (90)	33.9 (93.0)	33 (91)	36 (97)	31.5 (88.7)	26.7 (80.1)	18 (64)	11 (52)	33.9 (93.0)
Mean daily maximum °C (°F)	−9.3 (15.3)	−6 (21)	0.9 (33.6)	10.3 (50.5)	17.3 (63.1)	20.7 (69.3)	22.4 (72.3)	21 (70)	16.1 (61.0)	9.4 (48.9)	−2 (28)	−8 (18)	7.7 (45.9)
Daily mean °C (°F)	−14.8 (5.4)	−11.7 (10.9)	−4.8 (23.4)	4.2 (39.6)	10.5 (50.9)	14.5 (58.1)	16.2 (61.2)	14.8 (58.6)	10 (50)	3.9 (39.0)	−6.8 (19.8)	−13.3 (8.1)	1.9 (35.4)
Mean daily minimum °C (°F)	−20.3 (−4.5)	−17.3 (0.9)	−10.5 (13.1)	−1.9 (28.6)	3.8 (38.8)	8.2 (46.8)	10 (50)	8.4 (47.1)	3.8 (38.8)	−1.5 (29.3)	−11.5 (11.3)	−18.7 (−1.7)	−4 (25)
Record low °C (°F)	−48.3 (−54.9)	−45 (−49)	−37 (−35)	−22.8 (−9.0)	−7.2 (19.0)	−3.9 (25.0)	0 (32)	−4.5 (23.9)	−10.6 (12.9)	−28 (−18)	−41.1 (−42.0)	−50 (−58)	−50 (−58)
Average precipitation mm (inches)	29.1 (1.15)	21.4 (0.84)	18.6 (0.73)	22.2 (0.87)	40.6 (1.60)	75.8 (2.98)	72.4 (2.85)	65.8 (2.59)	42.2 (1.66)	28 (1.1)	24.2 (0.95)	27.8 (1.09)	468 (18.4)
Source: Environment Canada

== See also ==
- List of communities in Alberta
- List of former urban municipalities in Alberta
- List of hamlets in Alberta
