= Guy, Alberta =

Guy
- Hamlet
- Location of Guy in Alberta Location of Guy in Canada
- Coordinates: 55°32′56″N 117°07′12″W
- Country: Canada
- Province: Alberta
- Region: Northern Alberta
- Census division: 19
- Municipal district: Municipal District of Smoky River No. 130

Government
  - Type: Unincorporated
  - Governing body: Municipal District of Smoky River No. 130 Council

Population (1991)
  - Total: 57
- Time zone: UTC−06:00 (Alberta Time)
- Area codes: 780, 587, 825

Guy (/ɡiː/) is a hamlet in northern Alberta, Canada within the Municipal District of Smoky River No. 130. It is located on Highway 49, approximately 113 kilometres (70 mi) northeast of Grande Prairie. The inhabitants are named "Guylois" and "Guyloise".

== Demographics ==
Guy recorded a population of 57 in the 1991 Census of Population conducted by Statistics Canada.

== See also ==
- List of communities in Alberta
- List of hamlets in Alberta
