= Eaglesham, Alberta =

Eaglesham
- Hamlet
- Location of Eaglesham Eaglesham (Canada)
- Coordinates: 55°46′57″N 117°53′00″W
- Country: Canada
- Province: Alberta
- Region: Northern Alberta
- Census division: 17
- Municipal district: Birch Hills County

Government
  - Type: Unincorporated
  - Governing body: Birch Hills County Council

Area (2021)
  - Land: 0.84 km^{2} (0.32 sq mi)

Population (2021)
  - Total: 76
  - Density: 91/km^{2} (240/sq mi)
- Time zone: UTC−06:00 (Alberta Time)
- Area codes: 780, 587, 825

Eaglesham (/ˈiːɡəlzəm/) is a hamlet in northern Alberta, Canada within Birch Hills County, located 6 kilometres (3.7 mi) north of Highway 49, approximately 89 kilometres (55 mi) northeast of Grande Prairie.

The hamlet takes its name from Eaglesham in Scotland.

Eaglesham is primarily a farming community. Eaglesham also has a small K-12 school with 80 students.

== Demographics ==
Federal census population history
Year	Pop.	±%
1971	218	—
1976	229	+5.0%
1981	208	−9.2%
1986	197	−5.3%
1991	184	−6.6%
2001	147	−20.1%
2006	112	−23.8%
2011	119	+6.2%
2016	93	−21.8%
2021	76	−18.3%
Source: Statistics Canada

In the 2021 Census of Population conducted by Statistics Canada, Eaglesham had a population of 76 living in 45 of its 60 total private dwellings, a change of −18.3% from its 2016 population of 93. With a land area of 0.84 km^{2} (0.32 sq mi), it had a population density of 90.5/km^{2} (234.3/sq mi) in 2021.

As a designated place in the 2016 Census of Population conducted by Statistics Canada, Eaglesham had a population of 93 living in 50 of its 60 total private dwellings, a change of −21.8% from its 2011 population of 119. With a land area of 0.84 km^{2} (0.32 sq mi), it had a population density of 110.7/km^{2} (286.7/sq mi) in 2016.

== See also ==
- List of communities in Alberta
- List of designated places in Alberta
- List of former urban municipalities in Alberta
- List of hamlets in Alberta
- Eaglesham, Scotland
