= Upper Peace Region =

- Land-use framework region
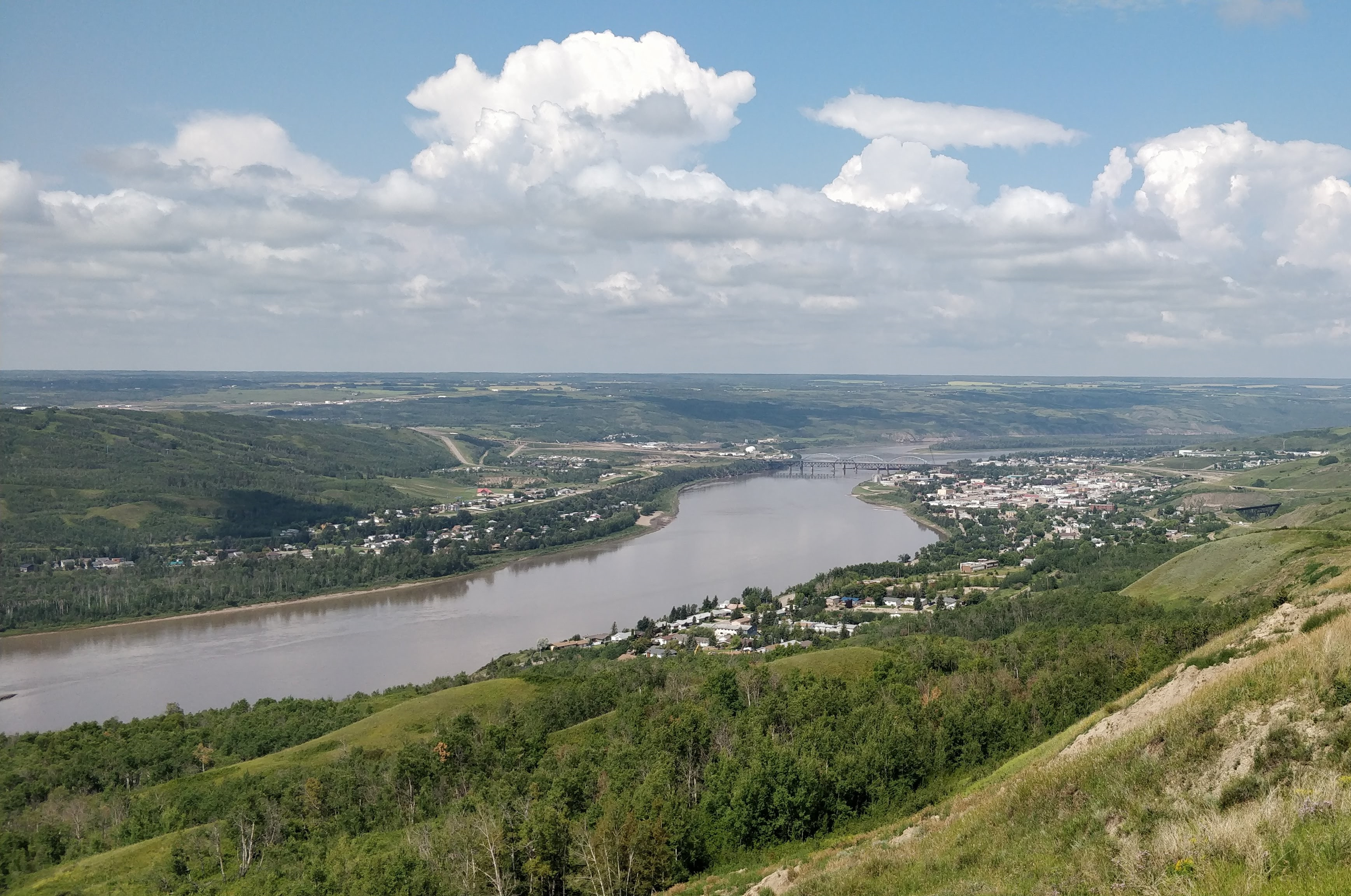
- Sagitawa Lookout, Peace River

- Location in Alberta
- Largest population centres: Grande Prairie; Peace River; Grande Cache; Fairview

Government
  - Parent authority: Alberta Environment and Parks

Area
  - Total: 74,270 km^{2} (28,680 sq mi)

Population (2016)
  - Total: 138,237
  - Density: 1.861/km^{2} (4.821/sq mi)

The Upper Peace Region is a land-use framework region in northern Alberta, Canada. One of seven in the province, each is intended to develop and implement a regional plan, complementing the planning efforts of member municipalities in order to coordinate future growth. Corresponding roughly to major watersheds while following municipal boundaries, these regions are managed by Alberta Environment and Parks.

== Communities ==
The following municipalities are contained in the Upper Peace Region.

Cities

- Grande Prairie

Towns

- Beaverlodge
- Fairview
- Fox Creek
- Grimshaw
- McLennan
- Peace River
- Sexsmith
- Spirit River
- Valleyview
- Wembley

Villages

- Berwyn
- Donnelly
- Girouxville
- Hines Creek
- Hythe
- Rycroft

Municipal districts

- Birch Hills County
- Clear Hills County
- Municipal District of Fairview
- County of Grande Prairie
- Municipal District of Greenview
- Municipal District of Peace
- Municipal District of Smoky River
- Municipal District of Spirit River
- Saddle Hills County

Improvement districts

- Improvement District No. 25 (Willmore Wilderness)

Indian reserves

- Alexander 134A
- Clear Hills 152C
- Duncan's 151A
- Horse Lakes 152B
- Sturgeon Lake 154
- Sturgeon Lake 154A
- Sturgeon Lake 154B
