= Spirit River (Alberta) =

Location
- Country: Canada
- Province: Alberta

Physical characteristics
- Source
  - location: Spirit Ridge
  - coordinates: 55.67918°N 119.18016°W
  - elevation: 920 meters (3,020 ft)
- Mouth
  - location: Saddle River
  - coordinates: 55.81531°N 118.37253°W
  - elevation: 440 meters (1,440 ft)

The Spirit River is a river in northern Alberta, Canada. The name is a translation of the Cree words Chepe Sepi, meaning ghost or spirit.

The town of Spirit River is established close to the river banks and is named for the river, as is the Municipal District of Spirit River No. 133 and the Spirit River Formation, a geological formation of the Western Canadian Sedimentary Basin.

== Course ==
The river originates in the Spirit Ridge, 25 kilometers (16 mi) southwest from the town of Spirit River, at an elevation of 920 meters (3,020 ft). It flows eastwards through the Municipal District of Spirit River No. 133, then by Rycroft, south of the Birch Hills into Birch Hills County. There it flows into the Saddle River (AKA Burnt River), at an elevation of 440 meters (1,440 ft); the Saddle River empties after 25 kilometers (16 mi) into the Peace River east of Dunvegan.

== See also ==
- List of rivers of Alberta
