= Bezanson, Alberta =

Bezanson
- Hamlet
- Location of Bezanson in Alberta
- Coordinates: 55.2286°N 118.3608°W
- Country: Canada
- Province: Alberta
- Region: Northern Alberta
- Planning region: Upper Peace
- Municipal district: Grande Prairie

Government
  - Type: Unincorporated
  - Reeve: Leanne Beaupre
  - Governing body: County of Grande Prairie No. 1 Council: Leanne Beaupre; Corey Beck; Daryl Beeston; Harold Bulford; Peter Harris; Bob Marshall; Karen Rosvold; Ross Sutherland; Linda Dianne Waddy

Area (2021)
  - Land: 1.11 km^{2} (0.43 sq mi)

Population (2021)
  - Total: 133
  - Density: 120.2/km^{2} (311/sq mi)
- Time zone: UTC−06:00 (Alberta Time)
- Postal code: T0H 0G0
- Area codes: 780, 587, 825

Bezanson is a hamlet in northern Alberta, Canada within the County of Grande Prairie No. 1. It is located approximately 30 kilometres (19 mi) east of Grande Prairie on Highway 43, west of the Smoky River.

== History ==
Born near Halifax, Nova Scotia September 1, 1878, A. M. Bezanson (Ancel Maynard) had come to the Peace River Country in 1906. On returning to Edmonton he published a pamphlet, 'The Peace River Trail', in May 1907 in an effort to increase interest in the area. He settled near the junction of the Wapiti, Smoky, and Simonette rivers in 1908 and started a settlement there. He died on 2 September 1959 in Vancouver, British Columbia. Bezanson was established in 1910, when it was expected that the Edmonton, Dunvegan & British Columbia Railway would pass through the region. The settlement grew until 1914, when it was found that the railway would pass to the north through Rycroft. The townsite was moved to be near the highway. A campsite and historical markers are at the original townsite 6 miles (9.7 km) to the southeast.

A ferry was opened in 1915 across the Smoky River. The first bridge over the river was built in 1949, near where the highway from Grande Prairie to Edmonton passed through the settlement. It was detoured in 2001, with the twinning of Highway 43 and the opening of the new Smoky River bridge.

== Geography ==
The nearby Kleskun Hills are the northernmost badlands in Canada and contain one of the few unbroken areas of the original prairie.

== Demographics ==
Population history of Bezanson
Year	Pop.	±%
1951	65	—
1956	73	+12.3%
1961	68	−6.8%
1966	67	−1.5%
1971	54	−19.4%
1976	65	+20.4%
1981	87	+33.8%
1986	62	−28.7%
1991	68	+9.7%
1991A	70	+2.9%
1996	72	+2.9%
2001	81	+12.5%
2006	137	+69.1%
2011	121	−11.7%
2016	107	−11.6%
2021	133	+24.3%
Source: Statistics Canada

In the 2021 Census of Population conducted by Statistics Canada, Bezanson had a population of 133 living in 58 of its 63 total private dwellings, a change of 24.3% from its 2016 population of 107. With a land area of 1.11 km^{2} (0.43 sq mi), it had a population density of 119.8/km^{2} (310.3/sq mi) in 2021.

As a designated place in the 2016 Census of Population conducted by Statistics Canada, Bezanson had a population of 107 living in 50 of its 55 total private dwellings, a change of −11.6% from its 2011 population of 121. With a land area of 1.11 km^{2} (0.43 sq mi), it had a population density of 96.4/km^{2} (249.7/sq mi) in 2016.

== See also ==
- Besançon, a city in France
- Kleskunsaurus
- List of communities in Alberta
- List of designated places in Alberta
- List of hamlets in Alberta
