= Winagami Lake =

Lake in Alberta, Canada

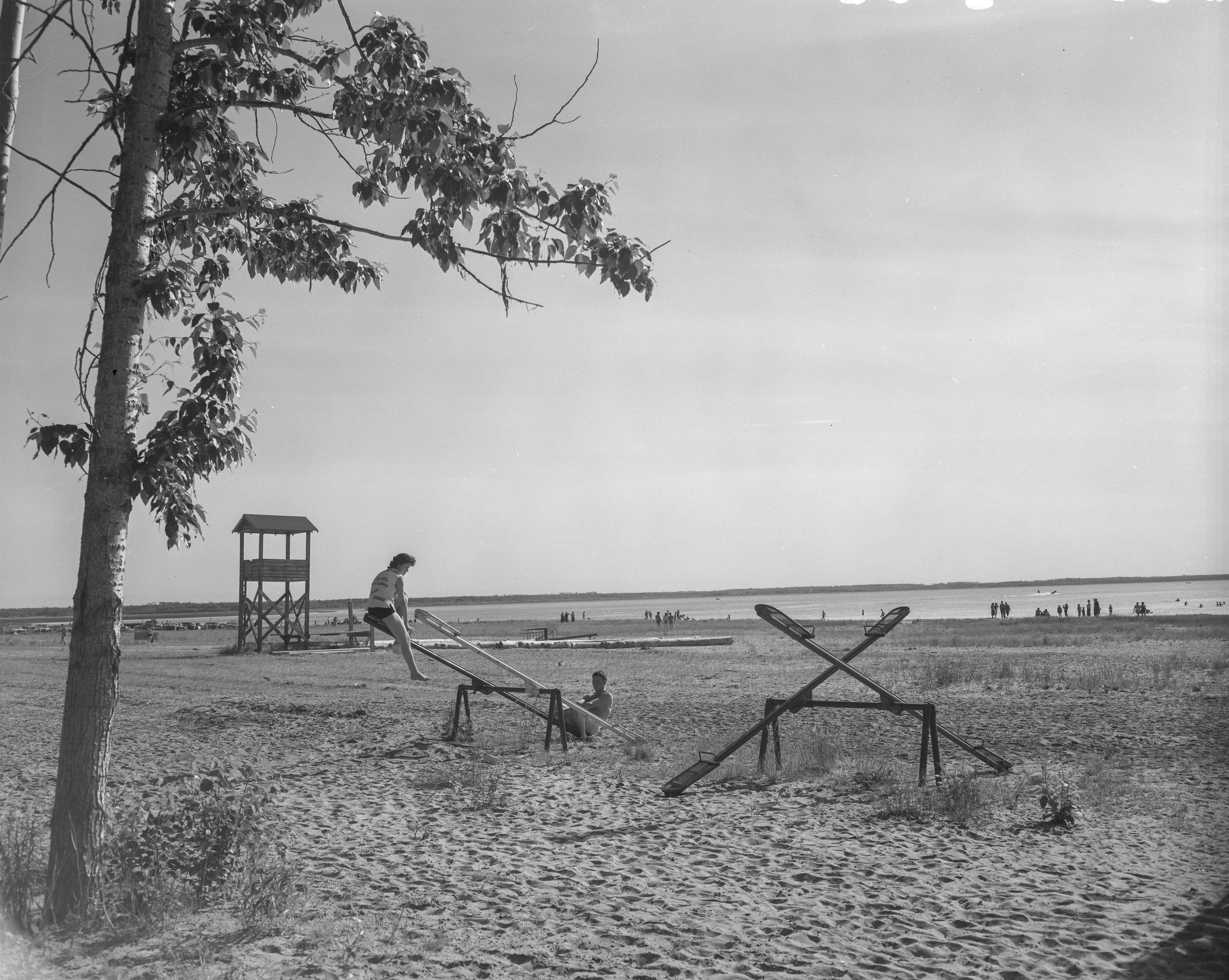
- Sunset on Winagami Lake

- Location within Alberta
- Location: Big Lakes County / Smoky River No. 130, Alberta
- Coordinates: 55°38′44″N 116°46′12″W
- Type: Hyper-eutrophic
- Primary outflows: South Heart River
- Catchment area: 221 km^{2} (85 sq mi)
- Basin countries: Canada
- Max. length: 14 km (8.7 mi)
- Max. width: 6 km (3.7 mi)
- Average depth: 1.7 m (5 ft 7 in)
- Max. depth: 4.7 m (15 ft)
- Surface elevation: 621 m (2,037 ft)
- Settlements: Kathleen

Winagami Lake (/wɪˈnɑːɡəmi/) is a large and shallow lake in northern Alberta, Canada. It is in Big Lakes County and Municipal District of Smoky River No. 130, northeast of the junction of Highway 2 and Highway 679. It lies in the hydrographic basin of the Athabasca River.

The name comes from a Cree phrase meaning "dirty-water lake": ᐃᐧᓇᑲᒣᐤ ᓵᑳᐦᐃᑲᐣ (winakamew sâkâhikan).

The lake contains lake whitefish, yellow perch, northern pike and walleye.

The lake is controlled by means of a weir, and has a mean depth of 1.7 metres (5.6 ft), with a maximum depth of 4.7 metres (15 ft).

Winagami Lake Provincial Park is on the western, southern and eastern shores of the lake.

== See also ==
- Lakes of Alberta
