= McLennan, Alberta =

McLennan
- Town
- Town of McLennan
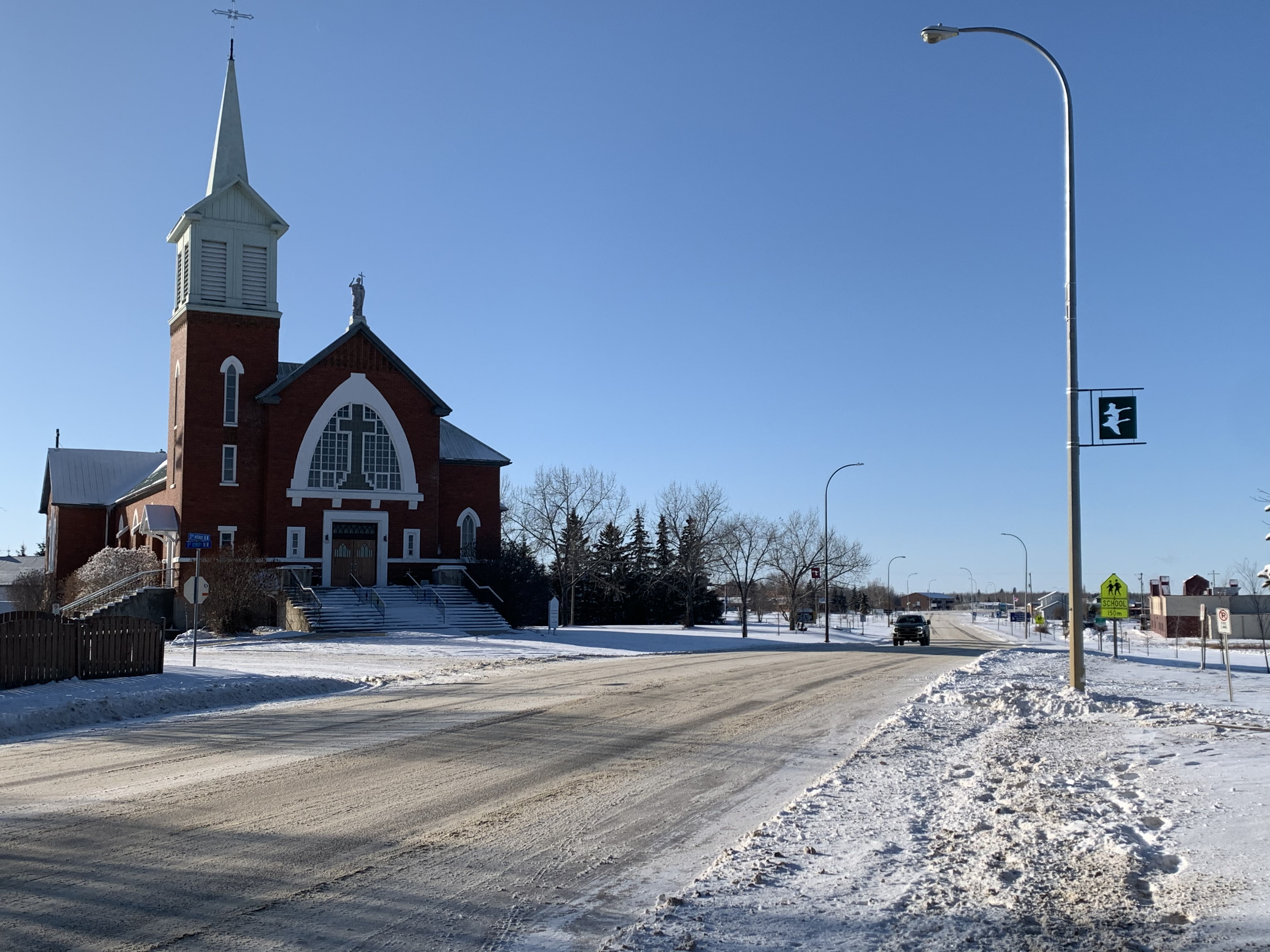
- Nickname: Bird Capital of Canada
- Location in the MD of Smoky River No. 130

- Location within Alberta
- Coordinates: 55°42′42″N 116°54′34″W
- Country: Canada
- Province: Alberta
- Region: Northern Alberta
- Planning region: Upper Peace
- Municipal district: Municipal District of Smoky River No. 130
- Incorporated
  - Village: February 1, 1940
  - Town: February 11, 1950

Government
  - Mayor: Jason Doris (Mayor)
  - Governing body: McLennan Town Council

Area (2021)
  - Land: 3.58 km^{2} (1.38 sq mi)
- Elevation: 625 m (2,051 ft)

Population (2021)
  - Total: 695
  - Density: 194.3/km^{2} (503/sq mi)
- Time zone: UTC−06:00 (Alberta Time)
- Postal codes: T0H 2L0
- Highways: Highway 2
- Waterway: Kimiwan Lake
- Website: Official website

McLennan is a town in northern Alberta, Canada. It is approximately 50 km (31 mi) north of High Prairie on Highway 2.

Named after John K. McLennan, vice president of the Edmonton, Dunvegan and British Columbia Railway on what used to be a community known as Round Lake, the town lies on the southern shore of Kimiwan Lake (the Cree word for rain), and northwest of Winagami Lake. The large concentration of shorebirds and waterfowl and McLennan's informal nickname as the 'Bird Capital of Canada' is due to the nearby lakes creating an attraction for migratory birds. Winagami Lake Provincial Park is located 29 km (18 mi) southeast of McLennan.

Its Cathédrale Saint-Jean-Baptiste, dedicated to John the Baptist, and built in 1947 is the archiepiscopal see of the Metropolitan Roman Catholic Archdiocese of Grouard–McLennan.

== Demographics ==
Federal census population history
Year	Pop.	±%
1946	823	—
1951	1,074	+30.5%
1956	1,092	+1.7%
1961	1,078	−1.3%
1966	1,104	+2.4%
1971	1,126	+2.0%
1976	1,133	+0.6%
1981	1,125	−0.7%
1986	993	−11.7%
1991	1,020	+2.7%
1996	867	−15.0%
2001	804	−7.3%
2006	824	+2.5%
2011	809	−1.8%
2016	701	−13.3%
Source: Statistics Canada

In the 2021 Census of Population conducted by Statistics Canada, the Town of McLennan had a population of 695 living in 255 of its 322 total private dwellings, a change of −0.9% from its 2016 population of 701. With a land area of 3.58 km^{2} (1.38 sq mi), it had a population density of 194.1/km^{2} (502.8/sq mi) in 2021.

In the 2016 Census of Population conducted by Statistics Canada, the Town of McLennan recorded a population of 701 living in 256 of its 296 total private dwellings, a −13.3% change from its 2011 population of 809. With a land area of 3.71 km^{2} (1.43 sq mi), it had a population density of 188.9/km^{2} (489.4/sq mi) in 2016.

The population of the Town of McLennan according to its 2017 municipal census is 791.

== See also ==
- List of communities in Alberta
- List of francophone communities in Alberta
- List of towns in Alberta
