= Girouxville =

- Village
- Village of Girouxville
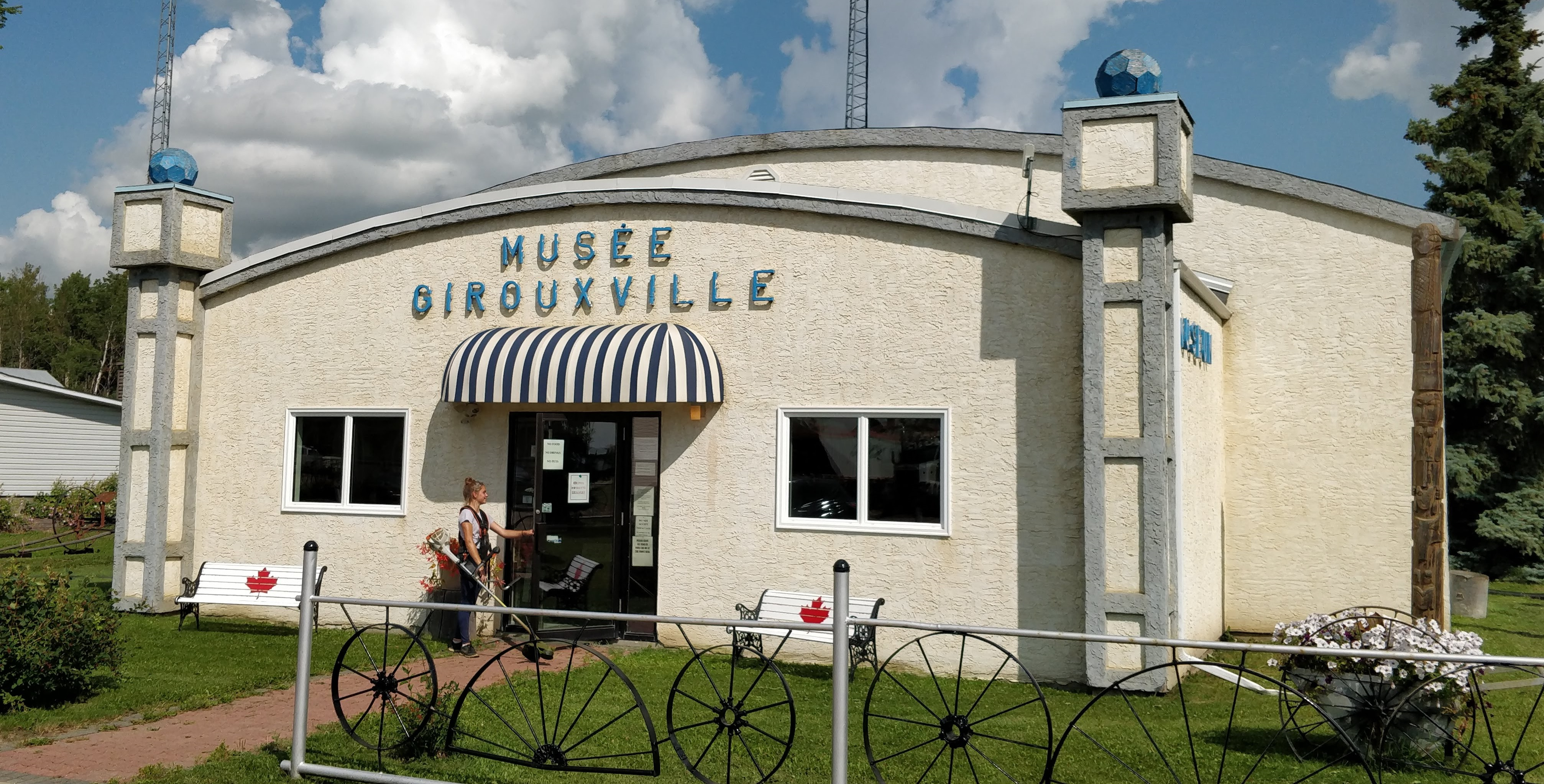
- Girouxville Museum

- Location in M.D. of Smoky River

- Location in Alberta
- Coordinates: 55°45′14″N 117°20′19″W
- Country: Canada
- Province: Alberta
- Region: Northern Alberta
- Planning region: Upper Peace
- Municipal district: Smoky River
- Incorporated
  - Village: December 31, 1951

Government
  - Mayor: Joseph Zdeb
  - Governing body: Girouxville Village Council

Area (2021)
  - Land: 0.66 km^{2} (0.25 sq mi)
- Elevation: 570 m (1,870 ft)

Population (2021)
  - Total: 278
  - Density: 422.4/km^{2} (1,094/sq mi)
- Time zone: UTC−06:00 (Alberta Time)
- Highways: Highway 49
- Waterway: Hunting Creek
- Website: https://www.girouxville.ca

Girouxville (/dʒɪˈruːvɪl/ ji-ROO-vil, Quebec French: [ʒiʁuˈvɪl]) is a village in northern Alberta, Canada. It is located 58 kilometres (36 mi) south of the Town of Peace River.

== History ==
The community has the name of the local Giroux family, being named after Father Henri Giroux, a Roman Catholic missionary appointed by Émile Grouard. In 1951, Girouxville was incorporated as a village. In June 2026, the village was hit by an EF2 tornado without prior warning, which caused extensive property damage to many houses.

== Demographics ==
Federal census population history
Year	Pop.	±%
1956	300	—
1961	318	+6.0%
1966	305	−4.1%
1971	347	+13.8%
1976	303	−12.7%
1981	325	+7.3%
1986	367	+12.9%
1991	349	−4.9%
1996	332	−4.9%
2001	306	−7.8%
2006	282	−7.8%
2011	266	−5.7%
2016	219	−17.7%
2021	278	+26.9%
Source: Statistics Canada

In the 2021 Census of Population conducted by Statistics Canada, the Village of Girouxville had a population of 278 living in 127 of its 150 total private dwellings, a change of 26.9% from its 2016 population of 219. With a land area of 0.66 km^{2} (0.25 sq mi), it had a population density of 421.2/km^{2} (1,090.9/sq mi) in 2021.

The population of the Village of Girouxville according to its 2017 municipal census is 289.

In the 2016 Census of Population conducted by Statistics Canada, the Village of Girouxville recorded a population of 219 living in 107 of its 130 total private dwellings, a −17.7% change from its 2011 population of 266. With a land area of 0.67 km^{2} (0.26 sq mi), it had a population density of 326.9/km^{2} (846.6/sq mi) in 2016.

== Notable people ==
Singer and actor Robert Goulet lived in Girouxville for a portion of his teenage years.

== See also ==
- List of communities in Alberta
- List of francophone communities in Alberta
- List of villages in Alberta
