= Division No. 19, Alberta =

Census division in Canada

Coordinates: 55°10′41″N 118°47′00″W

Division No. 19
- Census division in Alberta
- Country: Canada
- Province: Alberta

Area
  - Total: 20,454 km^{2} (7,897 sq mi)

Population (2021)
  - Total: 121,167
  - Density: 5.9239/km^{2} (15.343/sq mi)

Division No. 19 is a census division in Alberta, Canada. It is located in the west-central portion of northern Alberta and surrounds the City of Grande Prairie.

== Census subdivisions ==
Historical population
Year	Pop.	±%
1991	74,855	—
1996	79,665	+6.4%
2001	86,299	+8.3%
2006	98,712	+14.4%
2011	109,712	+11.1%
2016	120,380	+9.7%
2021	121,167	+0.7%

The following census subdivisions (municipalities or municipal equivalents) are located within Alberta's Division No. 19.

- Cities
  - Grande Prairie
- Towns
  - Beaverlodge
  - Fairview
  - Falher
  - Grimshaw
  - McLennan
  - Peace River
  - Sexsmith
  - Spirit River
  - Wembley
- Villages
  - Berwyn
  - Donnelly
  - Girouxville
  - Rycroft
- Municipal districts
  - Birch Hills County
  - Fairview No. 136, M.D. of
  - Grande Prairie No. 1, County of
  - Peace No. 135, M.D. of
  - Saddle Hills County
  - Smoky River No. 130, M.D. of
  - Spirit River No. 133, M.D. of
- Indian reserves
- Duncan's 151A
- Horse Lakes 152B

== Demographics ==
In the 2021 Census of Population conducted by Statistics Canada, Division No. 19 had a population of 121,167 living in 46,072 of its 51,616 total private dwellings, a change of 0.7% from its 2016 population of 120,380. With a land area of 20,454.38 km^{2} (7,897.48 sq mi), it had a population density of 5.9/km^{2} (15.3/sq mi) in 2021.

== See also ==
- List of census divisions of Alberta
- List of communities in Alberta
