= Patricia Joudry =

Canadian playwright and author (1921–2000)

Patricia Joudry (October 18, 1921 – October 28, 2000) was a Canadian playwright and author.

== Biography ==
Patricia was born in Spirit River, Alberta, the daughter of Clifford and Beth Joudry. While in her twenties, she began a career in radio broadcast, including co-writing the radio drama, The Aldrich Family from 1945–49. During her career, she wrote more than 300 plays, 250 of which were for radio broadcast. Her play Teach Me How to Cry was the basis of the 1958 film, The Restless Years. Starting as a CBS Sunday Night Series, Teach Me How To Cry eventually became Joudry's first stage play. After Teach Me How To Cry was awarded the distinction of ‘Honours’ at the Canadian Dominion Drama Festival it began to be broadcast in both London and New York. She became the first English-Canadian professional playwright to make a living from her writing in the 20th century. Patricia was a co-writer of the popular radio broadcast show, The Aldrich Family, a comedy series, broadcast from New York. At one point in her life, Joudry was earning one of the highest incomes of radio broadcasters in America.

As well as being a self-proclaimed clairvoyant and a successful playwright and radio writer, Joudry held many positions in other industries throughout her career; holding titles including actress, television writer, theatrical producer, photographer, and model.

Joudry lived in England and the United States from the 1940s until 1973, when she returned to Canada. Along with her daughter Rafaele, in 1984 she began introducing the use of sound therapy. She has been married and divorced twice. She died in Powell River, British Columbia.

== Money trouble ==
Patricia Joudry's husband, Spalding Steele appeared in bankruptcy court in Bristol, England in August 1963. It was believed that Steele had accumulated debts of €24,091 ($72,273). The unfortunate financial situation was a result of expensive house renovations totalling about €13,000 ($39,000). Steele proposed that the income from the vending of Joudry's many unpublished literary works at the time would cover the cost of these home renovations. The court would meet again in October 1963 to declare of verdict.

== Spirituality ==
Patricia Joudry wrote an estimated forty-five works in an eighteen-month period. These works were planned to fund her and Steele's house renovations. Steele declared to the bankruptcy court judge that his wife was able to produce this extensive amount of literary pieces because of her “spirit guides.” It took Joudry only a week to write a full-length stage play because of the voices in her head believed to be the “spirits of Shakespeare, Shaw, and Tolstoy.”

Steele believed that Joudry was a “spiritual medium” who could “[hear] and [see] clairvoyantly.” After paying for the home renovations with the theoretical money from selling her many plays, Joudry hoped to put her spiritual side to work by creating a new world religion.

In 1963, Joudry gave birth to her daughter with Steele. Joudry believed her newborn daughter was the “new Messiah.”

== Bibliography ==
- Twin Souls: A Guide to Finding Your True Spiritual Partner (1995) with Maurice D. Pressman and Carol Southern
- Twin Souls: Eternal Feminine, Eternal Masculine (1993) with Maurice D. Pressman
- Sound Therapy for the Walk Man (1989)
- The Selena Tree: a novel (1980)
- Spirit River to Angels' Roost: Religions I Have Loved and Left (1977)
- And the Children Played (1975)
- The Dweller on the Threshold (1973)
- My Lady Shiva (1973)
- I Ching (1971)
- Think Again (1969)
- Man with the Perfect Wife (1965)
- Wind in the wasteland: a new drama in three acts (1962)
- The Song of Louise in the Morning (1961)
- 3 Rings for Michelle: a play (1960)
- Semi-detached: a new drama (1959)
- Three Rings for Michelle (1956)
- Teach me how to cry: drama in three acts (1955)
- The Sand Castle (1955)
