= New Fish Creek, Alberta =

Locality in Alberta, Canada

Coordinates: 55°17′40″N 117°15′27″W

Location of New Fish Creek Alberta

New Fish Creek is an unincorporated locality in northern Alberta within the Municipal District of Greenview No. 16, located 3 kilometres (1.9 mi) west of Highway 49, 98 kilometres (61 mi) northeast of Grande Prairie.
