= Donnelly, Alberta =

Donnelly
- Village
- Village of Donnelly
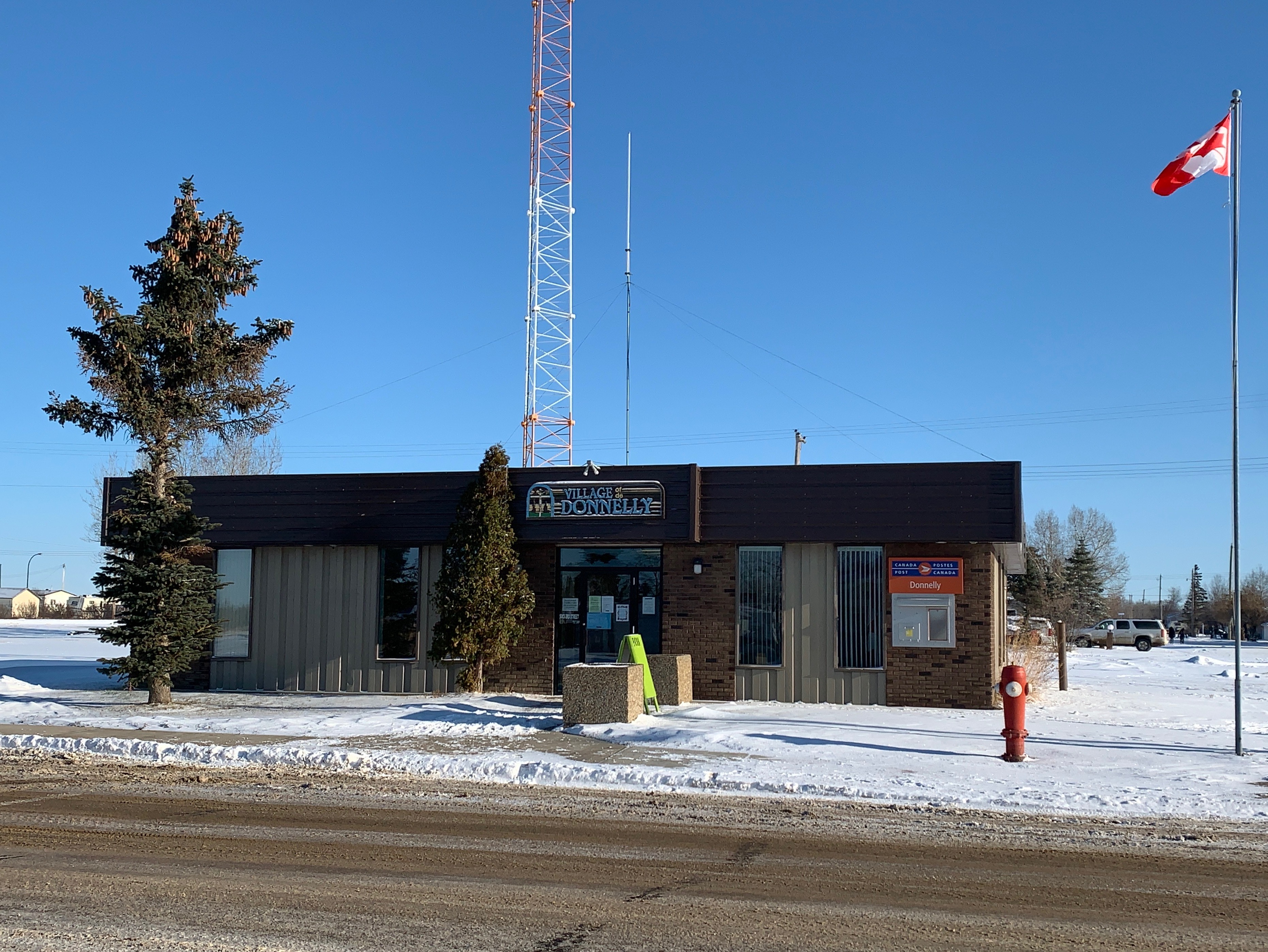
- Post Office in Donnelly, Alberta

- Location in M.D. of Smoky River

- Location in Alberta
- Coordinates: 55°43′22.2″N 117°06′16.9″W
- Country: Canada
- Province: Alberta
- Region: Northern Alberta
- Planning region: Upper Peace
- Municipal district: Smoky River
- Incorporated
  - Village: January 1, 1956

Government
  - Mayor: Myrna Lanctot
  - Governing body: Donnelly Village Council

Area (2021)
  - Land: 1.26 km^{2} (0.49 sq mi)
- Elevation: 595 m (1,952 ft)

Population (2021)
  - Total: 338
  - Density: 269/km^{2} (700/sq mi)
- Time zone: UTC−06:00 (Alberta Time)
- Highways: Highway 2 Highway 49
- Website: Official website

Donnelly is a village in northern Alberta, Canada within the Municipal District of Smoky River No. 130. It is located near the intersection of Highway 2 and Highway 49, located approximately 65 km (40 mi) south of Peace River and 427 km (265 mi) northwest of Edmonton.

== History ==
In 1912, a group of 14 settlers from Grouard arrived in the Donnelly area. Marie-Anne Leblanc Gravel was first homesteader.

The community was named after one Mr. Donnelly, a railroad employee.

== Demographics ==
Federal census population history
| Year | Pop. | ±% |
|---|---|---|
| 1956 | 265 | — |
| 1961 | 289 | +9.1% |
| 1966 | 249 | −13.8% |
| 1971 | 274 | +10.0% |
| 1976 | 278 | +1.5% |
| 1981 | 336 | +20.9% |
| 1986 | 405 | +20.5% |
| 1991 | 421 | +4.0% |
| 1996 | 375 | −10.9% |
| 2001 | 377 | +0.5% |
| 2006 | 293 | −22.3% |
| 2011 | 305 | +4.1% |
| 2016 | 342 | +12.1% |
Source: Statistics Canada

In the 2021 Census of Population conducted by Statistics Canada, the Village of Donnelly had a population of 338 living in 154 of its 185 total private dwellings, a change of −5.8% from its 2016 population of 359. With a land area of 1.26 km^{2} (0.49 sq mi), it had a population density of 268.3/km^{2} (694.8/sq mi) in 2021.

In the 2016 Census of Population conducted by Statistics Canada, the Village of Donnelly recorded a population of 342 living in 150 of its 170 total private dwellings, a 12.1% change from its 2011 population of 305. With a land area of 1.31 km^{2} (0.51 sq mi), it had a population density of 261.1/km^{2} (676.2/sq mi) in 2016.

== Transportation ==
Donnelly is served by the Donnelly Airport (IATA: YOE, TC LID: CFM4).

== See also ==
- List of communities in Alberta
- List of francophone communities in Alberta
- List of villages in Alberta
