= Winagami Lake Provincial Park =

Provincial park in Alberta, Canada

Coordinates: 55°38′36″N 116°40′47″W

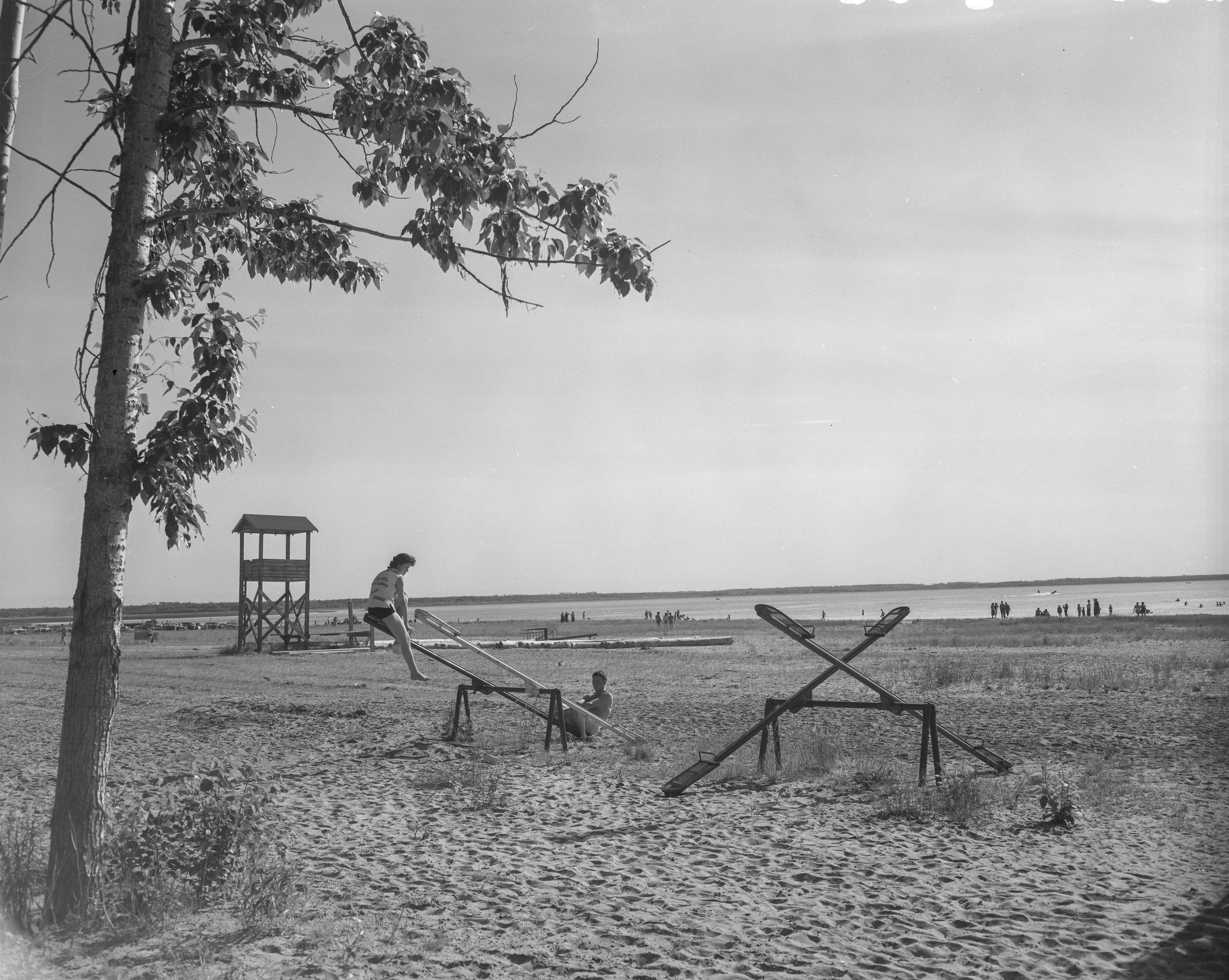
Winagami Lake Provincial Park, 1961

Winagami Lake Provincial Park is a provincial park in Alberta, Canada, located on three sides of Winagami Lake and accessible from Highway 2, about 30 km north of High Prairie. The park was established on November 13, 1956.

Winagami Wildland Park is an extension of the park.

== See also ==
- List of provincial parks in Alberta
- List of Canadian provincial parks
- List of National Parks of Canada
