= Kathleen, Alberta =

Coordinates: 55°37′17″N 116°50′10″W

Location of Kathleen, Alberta

Kathleen is an unincorporated community in northern Alberta in the Municipal District of Smoky River No. 130, located on Highway 2, 134 kilometres (83 mi) northeast of Grande Prairie.

It is named after a relative of W. R Smith, general manager of the Edmonton, Dunvegan and British Columbia Railway
