= Spirit River, Alberta =

Spirit River
- Town
- Town of Spirit River
- Town boundaries

- Location in the M.D. of Spirit River Location in Alberta
- Coordinates: 55°46′46″N 118°50′11″W
- Country: Canada
- Province: Alberta
- Region: Northern Alberta
- Planning region: Upper Peace
- Municipal district: Municipal District of Spirit River No. 133
- Incorporated
  - Village: June 13, 1916
  - Town: September 18, 1951

Government
  - Mayor: Tammy Yaremko
  - Deputy Mayor: Ryan Funk

Area (2021)
  - Land: 3.11 km^{2} (1.20 sq mi)
- Elevation: 640 m (2,100 ft)

Population (2021)
  - Total: 992
- Time zone: UTC−06:00 (Alberta Time)
- Area code: 1-780
- Highways: Highway 49; Highway 731
- Waterways: Spirit River; Dunvegan Creek
- Website: Official website

Spirit River is a town in northern Alberta, Canada. It is approximately 78 km (48 mi) north of Grande Prairie and 7 km (4.3 mi) west of Rycroft at the junction of Highway 49 and Highway 731.

== Demographics ==
Federal census population history
Year	Pop.	±%
1921	210	—
1926	167	−20.5%
1931	232	+38.9%
1936	234	+0.9%
1941	276	+17.9%
1946	362	+31.2%
1951	553	+52.8%
1956	743	+34.4%
1961	890	+19.8%
1966	1,034	+16.2%
1971	1,121	+8.4%
1976	1,020	−9.0%
1981	1,104	+8.2%
1986	1,086	−1.6%
1991	1,016	−6.4%
1996	1,112	+9.4%
2001	1,100	−1.1%
2006	1,148	+4.4%
2011	1,025	−10.7%
2016	995	−2.9%
2021	992	−0.3%
Source: Statistics Canada

In the 2021 Census of Population conducted by Statistics Canada, the Town of Spirit River had a population of 992 living in 445 of its 510 total private dwellings, a change of −0.3% from its 2016 population of 995. With a land area of 3.11 km^{2} (1.20 sq mi), it had a population density of 319.0/km^{2} (826.1/sq mi) in 2021.

In the 2016 Census of Population conducted by Statistics Canada, the Town of Spirit River recorded a population of 995 living in 442 of its 487 total private dwellings, a −2.9% change from its 2011 population of 1,025. With a land area of 3.14 km^{2} (1.21 sq mi), it had a population density of 316.9/km^{2} (820.7/sq mi) in 2016.

== Economy ==
The community is largely agricultural, being located in the fertile Peace Country. It also features an active oil and gas industry.

== History ==
The name Spirit River comes from the Cree Chepe Sepe, or Ghost River.

In 1891, a trading post became the original settlement along the banks of the Spirit River. Ranching in the area started as early as the 1840s and farming in the 1880s. The first school opened in 1910. In 1915, to the northwest, on Section 22, the Edmonton, Dunvegan and British Columbia Railway subdivided a townsite called Spirit River Station. The residents and storekeepers at the old settlement then moved, creating a village in 1916. On February 16 of that year, the Herald Tribune reported that McRae & Co. opened a general store. Spirit River was incorporated as a town in 1951.

In 1923, the wheat pool was established.

In October 2013, a pipeline inspection crew working in the Saddle Hills area southwest of Spirit River unearthed a 10-metre long dinosaur fossil. It was later confirmed to be that of the duck-billed hadrosaur.

The Town of Spirit River, along with the Municipal District of Spirit River celebrated its 100th anniversary in August 2016.

== Government ==
The Municipal District of Spirit River No. 133's municipal office is located in Spirit River. It is also home to the Peace-Wapiti School Board and provincial offices for Alberta Agriculture and Fish and Wildlife.

== Infrastructure ==
Transportation

A paved airport accommodates medical emergency flights and private aircraft.

Recreation

The town features a curling rink, arena, outdoor pool, library, museum and community hall.

Health care

Spirit River is home to a hospital and the Central Peace Health Centre, a newly constructed clinic that has physician, dentist, physiotherapist and massage therapist offices. A new 92-bed seniors care home is set to open in 2024.

== Education ==
The town is home to two schools – Ste. Marie Catholic School (elementary) and Spirit River Regional Academy (K-12).

== Sports ==
The Spirit River Rangers of the North Peace Hockey League play out of the Maclean Rec Centre.

== Notable people ==
- Hilarion Kapral, a bishop and First Hierarch of ROCOR
- Patricia Joudry, screenwriter.
- Tim Howar, singer and dancer, known as a London-based rock vocalist with Mike + the Mechanics
- Dayle Ross, professional ice hockey player in the PWHL
- Aaron Goodvin, country singer
- Frank Grigware, who escaped from Leavenworth Prison while serving a life sentence for train robbery, and was elected mayor in 1916 using the name James Fahey

== See also ==
- List of communities in Alberta
- List of towns in Alberta
