= Little Smoky River =

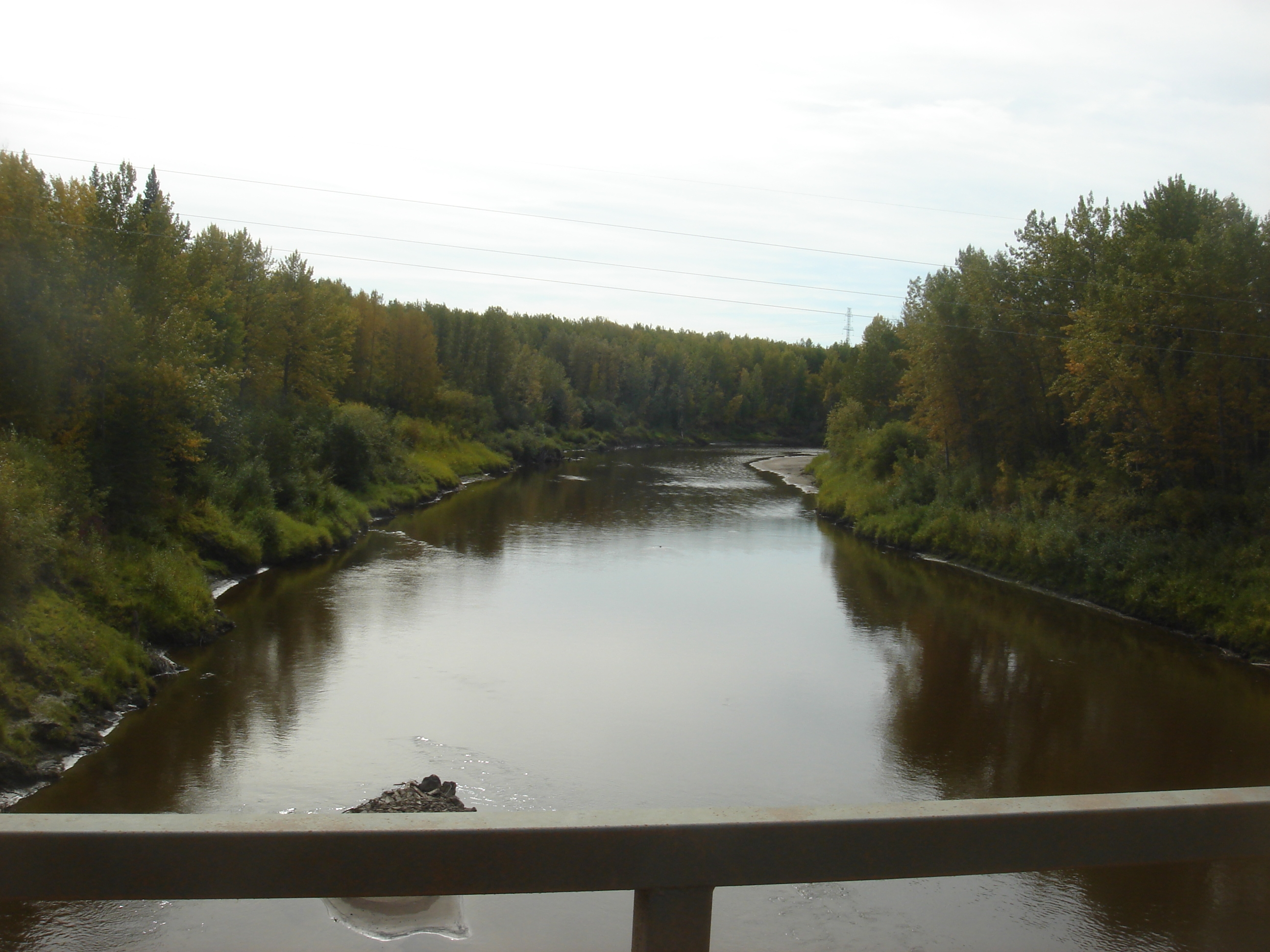
- Little Smoky south of Valleyview

Location
- Country: Canada
- Province: Alberta

Physical characteristics
- Source
  - location: Canadian Rockies
  - coordinates: 53.86400°N 118.40598°W
  - elevation: 1,470 m (4,820 ft)
- Mouth
  - location: Smoky River
  - coordinates: 55.67370°N 117.62706°W
  - elevation: 385 m (1,263 ft)
- Discharge
  - average: 25 m^{3}/s (880 cu ft/s)

The Little Smoky River is a tributary of the Smoky River in west-central Alberta, Canada.

== Course ==
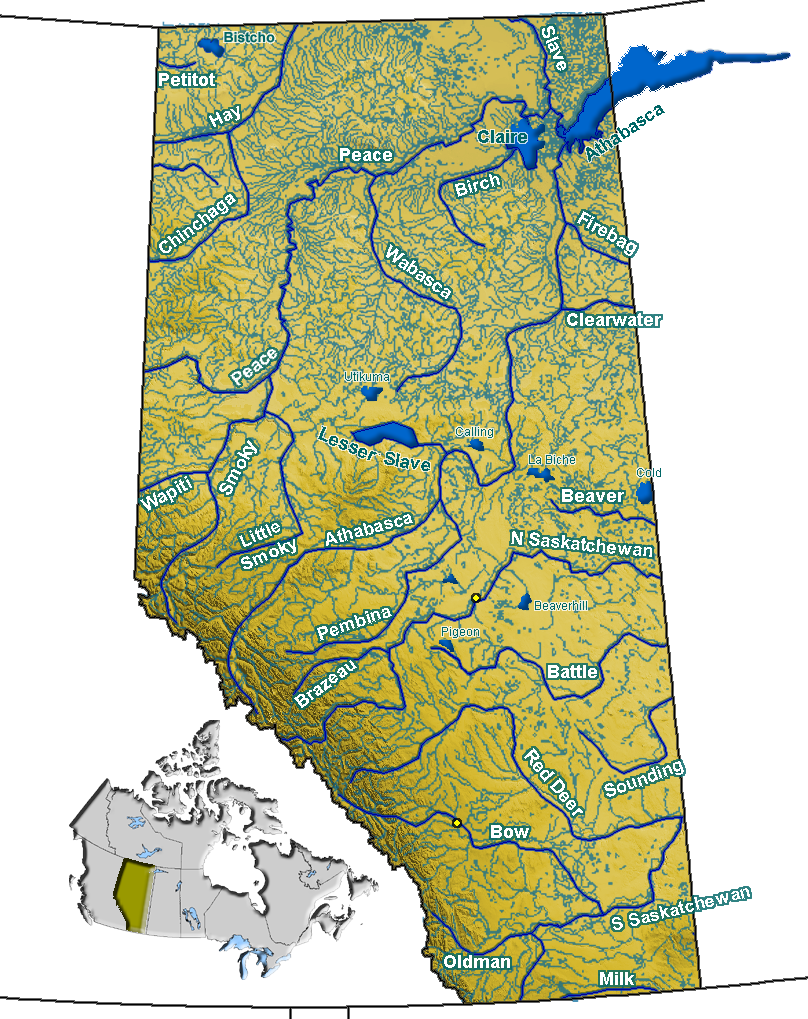
Little Smoky River in Alberta

The river originates in the foothills of the Canadian Rockies, west of Grande Cache and flows in a north-east direction throughout the foothills. Upon reaching the open prairie, it meanders northwards and merges into the Smoky River south of the town of Watino. From here, its waters are carried to the Arctic Ocean through the Peace, Slave and Mackenzie Rivers.

The Little Smoky River has an average discharge of 25 m³/s, and can reach over 100 m³/s in spring.

The towns of Valleyview and Little Smoky are located in the Little Smoky River basin.

== Tributaries ==
- Joachim Creek
- David Creek
- Rocky Creek
- Kiskiu Creek
- Smoky Lake
- Tony Creek
- Iosegun River
- Waskahigan River
- Asplund Creek
- Goose River
- Sweathouse Creek
- Sturgeon Creek (from Sturgeon Lake)
- Boulder Creek
- Snipe Creek (from Snipe Lake)
- Deep Creek
- Stony Creek
  - Crazy Man Creek
- Bartsch Creek
- Nicholls Creek
- Mcleans Creek
- Gunns Creek
- Wabatanisk Creek
- Peavine Creek
- Whitemud Creek
- Shufflemire Creek

== See also ==
- Geography of Alberta
- List of Alberta rivers
