= Rycroft, Alberta =

Rycroft
- Village
- Village of Rycroft
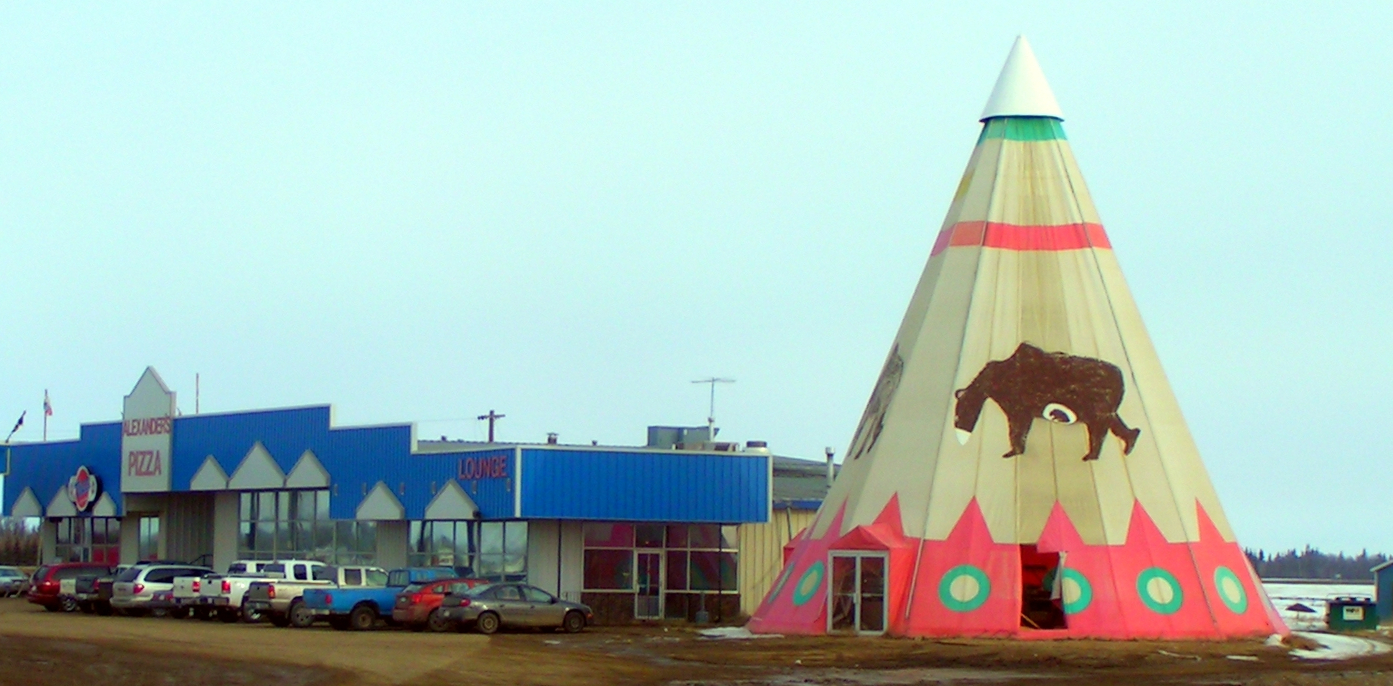
- Strip mall and tipi in Rycroft

- Seal
- Motto: Hub of the Peace
- Location in the MD of Spirit River No. 133

- Location of Rycroft in Alberta
- Coordinates: 55°45′28″N 118°41′48″W
- Country: Canada
- Province: Alberta
- Region: Northern Alberta
- Planning region: Upper Peace
- Municipal district: Municipal District of Spirit River No. 133
- Incorporated
  - Village: March 15, 1944

Government
  - Mayor: James Verquin
  - Governing body: Rycroft Village Council

Area (2021)
  - Land: 1.85 km^{2} (0.71 sq mi)
- Elevation: 600 m (2,000 ft)

Population (2021)
  - Total: 550
  - Density: 297.1/km^{2} (769/sq mi)
- Time zone: UTC−06:00 (Alberta Time)
- Highways: 2; 49
- Waterways: Spirit River
- Website: Official website

Rycroft is a village in northern Alberta, Canada. It is approximately 68 km (42 mi) north of Grande Prairie and 7 km (4.3 mi) east of Spirit River. Dunvegan Provincial Park is located 20 km north of the community.

The post office was originally known as Spirit River. The name was changed to Roycroft in 1920 to honour R.H. Roycroft, a prominent local citizen, and was altered to Rycroft in 1933.

== Demographics ==
Federal census population history
Year	Pop.	±%
1946	272	—
1951	372	+36.8%
1956	424	+14.0%
1961	500	+17.9%
1966	539	+7.8%
1971	461	−14.5%
1976	533	+15.6%
1981	649	+21.8%
1986	672	+3.5%
1991	634	−5.7%
1996	667	+5.2%
2001	609	−8.7%
2006	638	+4.8%
2011	628	−1.6%
2016	612	−2.5%
Source: Statistics Canada

In the 2021 Census of Population conducted by Statistics Canada, the Village of Rycroft had a population of 550 living in 243 of its 299 total private dwellings, a change of −10.1% from its 2016 population of 612. With a land area of 1.85 km^{2} (0.71 sq mi), it had a population density of 297.3/km^{2} (770.0/sq mi) in 2021.

In the 2016 Census of Population conducted by Statistics Canada, the Village of Rycroft recorded a population of 612 living in 274 of its 316 total private dwellings, a −2.5% change from its 2011 population of 628. With a land area of 1.92 km^{2} (0.74 sq mi), it had a population density of 318.8/km^{2} (825.6/sq mi) in 2016.

== See also ==
- List of communities in Alberta
- List of villages in Alberta
- Peace Country
