= Municipal District of Smoky River No. 130 =

Municipal district in Alberta, Canada

- Municipal district
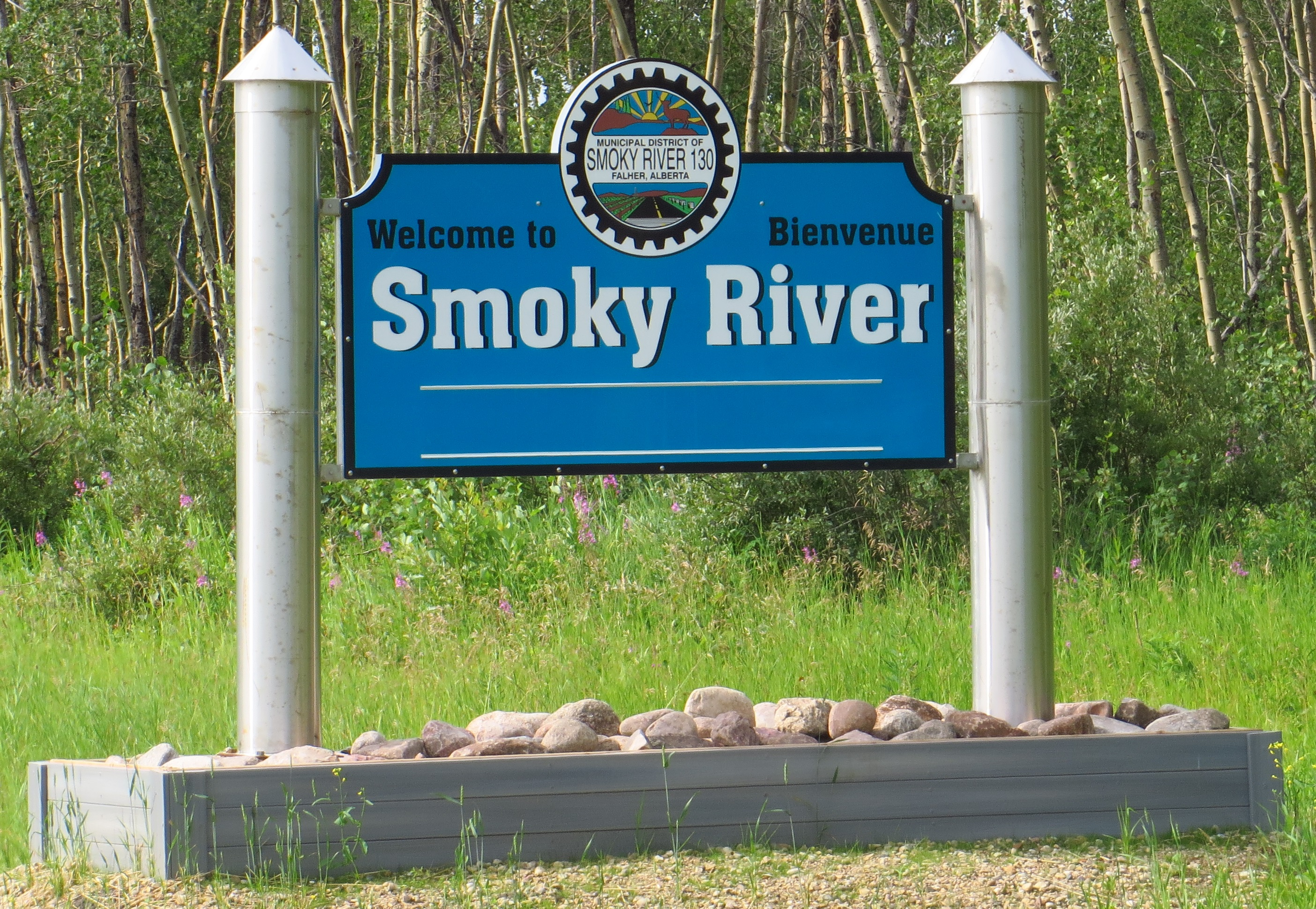
- Welcome sign

- Location within Alberta
- Country: Canada
- Province: Alberta
- Region: Northern Alberta
- Census division: 19
- Established: 1952
- Incorporated: 1952

Government
  - Reeve: Robert Brochu
  - Governing body: MD of Smoky River Council
  - Administrative office: Falher

Area (2021)
  - Land: 2,834.18 km^{2} (1,094.28 sq mi)

Population (2021)
  - Total: 1,895
- Time zone: UTC−06:00 (Alberta Time)
- Website: mdsmokyriver.com

The Municipal District of Smoky River No. 130 is a municipal district (MD) in northwestern Alberta, Canada. Located in Census Division No. 19, its municipal office is located in the Town of Falher.

== History ==
On January 1, 1952, its name was changed from MD of Fillion No. 130 to its current name, which was taken from Smoky River, a tributary of Peace River.

== Geography ==
=== Communities and localities ===
The following urban municipalities are surrounded by the MD of Smoky River No. 130.

Cities

- none

Towns

- Falher
- McLennan

Villages

- Donnelly
- Girouxville

Summer villages

- none

The following hamlets are located within the MD of Smoky River No. 130.

Hamlets

- Guy
- Jean Cote

The following localities are located within the MD of Smoky River No. 130.

Localities

- Ballater
- Crowell
- Culp
- Dreau
- Forest View
- Kathleen
- Lac Magloire
- Little Smoky
- Normandville
- Roxana
- Whitemud Creek
- Winagami

== Demographics ==
Federal census population history
Year	Pop.	±%
1951	4,374	—
1956	3,955	−9.6%
1961	4,094	+3.5%
1966	3,984	−2.7%
1971	3,400	−14.7%
1976	2,948	−13.3%
1981	2,858	−3.1%
1986	2,853	−0.2%
1991	2,613	−8.4%
1996	2,491	−4.7%
2001	2,379	−4.5%
2006	2,442	+2.6%
2011	2,126	−12.9%
2016	2,023	−4.8%
2021	1,895	−6.3%
Source: Statistics Canada

In the 2021 Census of Population conducted by Statistics Canada, the MD of Smoky River No. 130 had a population of 1,895 living in 664 of its 878 total private dwellings, a change of −5.5% from its 2016 population of 2,006. With a land area of 2,834.18 km^{2} (1,094.28 sq mi), it had a population density of 0.7/km^{2} (1.7/sq mi) in 2021.

In the 2016 Census of Population conducted by Statistics Canada, the MD of Smoky River No. 130 had a population of 2,023 living in 720 of its 891 total private dwellings, a −4.8% change from its 2011 population of 2,126. With a land area of 2,840.14 km^{2} (1,096.58 sq mi), it had a population density of 0.7/km^{2} (1.8/sq mi) in 2016.

== See also ==
- List of communities in Alberta
- List of francophone communities in Alberta
- List of municipal districts in Alberta
