= Birch Hills County =

Municipal district in Alberta, Canada

- Municipal district
- Logo

- Location within Alberta
- Country: Canada
- Province: Alberta
- Region: Northern Alberta
- Census division: 19
- Established: 1995

Government
  - Reeve: Gerald Manzulenko
  - Governing body: Birch Hills County Council
  - Administrative office: Wanham

Area (2021)
  - Land: 2,848.75 km^{2} (1,099.91 sq mi)

Population (2021)
  - Total: 1,516
  - Density: 0.5/km^{2} (1.3/sq mi)
- Time zone: UTC−06:00 (Alberta Time)
- Website: birchhillscounty.com

Birch Hills County is a municipal district in north-western Alberta, Canada. It is located in Census Division 19, northeast of Grande Prairie.

The district takes its name from a range of hills of the same name, which in turn were named by Cree Indians.

== History ==
In January 2021, a helicopter crash happened in the county, in which a family of four were killed.

== Geography ==
=== Communities and localities ===
The following urban municipalities are surrounded by Birch Hills County.

Cities

- none

Towns

- none

Villages

- none

Summer villages

- none

The following hamlets are located within Birch Hills County.

Hamlets

- Eaglesham
- Peoria
- Tangent
- Wanham (dissolved from village status in 1999, location of municipal office)
- Watino

The following localities are located within Birch Hills County.

Localities

- Belloy
- Codesa
- Heart Valley

== Demographics ==
In the 2021 Census of Population conducted by Statistics Canada, Birch Hills County had a population of 1,516 living in 485 of its 637 total private dwellings, a change of −2.4% from its 2016 population of 1,553. With a land area of 2,848.75 km^{2} (1,099.91 sq mi), it had a population density of 0.5/km^{2} (1.4/sq mi) in 2021.

In the 2016 Census of Population conducted by Statistics Canada, Birch Hills County had a population of 1,553 living in 496 of its 616 total private dwellings, a −1.8% change from its 2011 population of 1,582. With a land area of 2,859.6 km^{2} (1,104.1 sq mi), it had a population density of 0.5/km^{2} (1.4/sq mi) in 2016.

== See also ==
- List of communities in Alberta
- List of francophone communities in Alberta
- List of municipal districts in Alberta
