= Municipal District of Spirit River No. 133 =

Municipal district in Alberta, Canada

Spirit River No. 133
- Municipal district
- Municipal District of Spirit River No. 133
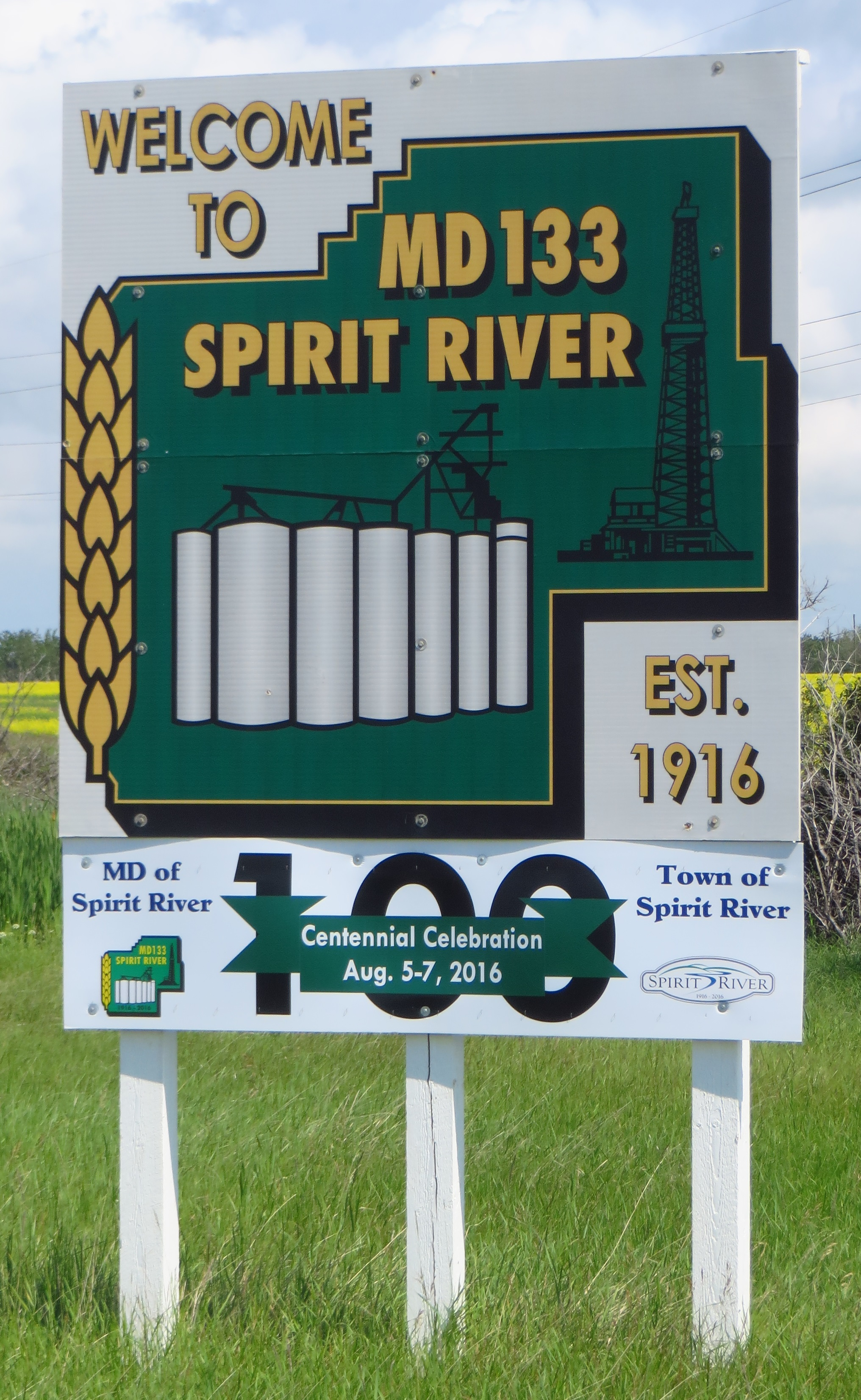
- Welcome sign

- Location within Alberta
- Country: Canada
- Province: Alberta
- Region: Northern Alberta
- Planning region: Upper Peace
- Established: 1916
- Incorporated: 1916

Government
  - Reeve: Stanley W. Bzowy
  - Governing body: MD of Spirit River Council
  - Administrative office: Spirit River

Area (2021)
  - Land: 679.86 km^{2} (262.50 sq mi)

Population (2021)
  - Total: 649
  - Density: 1/km^{2} (2.6/sq mi)
- Time zone: UTC−06:00 (Alberta Time)
- Website: mdspiritriver.ab.ca

The Municipal District of Spirit River No. 133 is a municipal district (MD) in northwest Alberta, Canada, north of Grande Prairie. Located in the Upper Peace Region, its municipal office is located in the Town of Spirit River. With an area of 683.6 km^{2} (263.9 mi^{2}), it is the smallest municipal district in Alberta.

== History ==
The MD of Spirit River No. 133 was incorporated in 1916.

== Geography ==
=== Communities and localities ===
The following urban municipalities are surrounded by the MD of Spirit River No. 133.

Cities

- none

Towns

- Spirit River

Villages

- Rycroft

Summer villages

- none

The following hamlets are located within the MD of Spirit River No. 133.

Hamlets

- none

The following localities are located within the MD of Spirit River No. 133.

Localities

- Bridgeview
- Manir
- Prestville
- Silverwood
- Spirit River Settlement

== Demographics ==
Federal census population history
Year	Pop.	±%
1916	899	—
1921	888	−1.2%
1926	893	+0.6%
1931	1,800	+101.6%
1936	1,890	+5.0%
1941	1,828	−3.3%
1946	1,404	−23.2%
1951	1,406	+0.1%
1956	1,413	+0.5%
1961	1,318	−6.7%
1966	1,243	−5.7%
1971	1,022	−17.8%
1976	857	−16.1%
1981	891	+4.0%
1986	848	−4.8%
1991	812	−4.2%
1996	809	−0.4%
2001	824	+1.9%
2006	662	−19.7%
2011	713	+7.7%
2016	700	−1.8%
Source: Statistics Canada

In the 2021 Census of Population conducted by Statistics Canada, the MD of Spirit River No. 133 had a population of 649 living in 273 of its 315 total private dwellings, a change of −7.3% from its 2016 population of 700. With a land area of 679.86 km^{2} (262.50 sq mi), it had a population density of 1.0/km^{2} (2.5/sq mi) in 2021.

In the 2016 Census of Population conducted by Statistics Canada, the MD of Spirit River No. 133 had a population of 700 living in 274 of its 306 total private dwellings, a −1.8% change from its 2011 population of 713. With a land area of 683.6 km^{2} (263.9 sq mi), it had a population density of 1.0/km^{2} (2.7/sq mi) in 2016.

== See also ==
- List of communities in Alberta
- List of municipal districts in Alberta
