= List of census divisions of Alberta =

Census divisions of Alberta
- Category: Census division
- Location: Alberta
- Number: 19
- Populations: 9,220 (Division No. 4) – 1,590,639 (Division No. 6)
- Subdivisions: Cities, towns, villages, summer villages, specialized municipalities, municipal districts, special areas, improvement districts, Indian reserves, Indian settlements

Population density map of Alberta census divisions (people/km^{2}) 0-1 1.1-2 2.1-5 5.1-10 10.1-20 20.1-40 40.1-60 60.1-80 >80

Statistics Canada divides the province of Alberta into nineteen census divisions. Unlike in some other provinces, census divisions do not reflect the organization of local government in Alberta. These areas exist solely for the purposes of statistical analysis and presentation; they have no government of their own.

Alberta's census divisions consist of numerous census subdivisions. The types of census subdivisions within an Alberta census division may include:

- cities, towns, villages, and summer villages (urban municipalities);
- specialized municipalities;
- municipal districts, special areas, and improvement districts (rural municipalities);
- Indian reserves; and
- Indian settlements.

== List of census divisions ==
The following is a list of Alberta's census divisions. Population, area, and density figures are from the 2021 Census.

Div.	Pop.	Area (km^{2})	Density (/km^{2})	Largest urban community	Specialized/rural municipalities
1	82,513	20,277.52	4.1	Medicine Hat	Cypress County; County of Forty Mile No. 8
2	178,513	17,456.33	10.2	Lethbridge	Lethbridge County; County of Newell; Municipal District of Taber; County of Warner No. 5
3	40,768	13,725.07	3.0	Claresholm	Cardston County; Improvement District No. 4 Municipal District of Pincher Creek No. 9 Municipal District of Willow Creek No. 26
4	9,220	21,055.21	0.4	Hanna	Acadia MD; Special Area 2 Special Area 3 Special Area 4
5	55,784	16,651.23	3.4	Strathmore	Kneehill County; Starland County; Vulcan County; Wheatland County
6	1,590,639	12,614.18	126.1	Calgary	Foothills County; Mountain View County; Rocky View County
7	40,684	18,909.66	2.2	Wainwright	Flagstaff County; County of Paintearth No. 18; Provost MD; Stettler County; Wainwright MD
8	213,470	9,890.05	21.6	Red Deer	Lacombe County; Ponoka County; Red Deer County
9	20,569	18,834.93	1.1	Rocky Mountain House	Clearwater County
10	95,455	20,134.12	4.7	Lloydminster	Beaver County; Camrose County; Improvement District 13; Lamont County; County of Minburn No. 27; County of Two Hills No. 21; County of Vermilion River
11	1,462,041	15,746.42	92.8	Edmonton	Brazeau County; Leduc County; Parkland County; Strathcona County; Sturgeon County; County of Wetaskiwin No. 10
12	67,483	31,816.86	2.1	Cold Lake	Bonnyville MD; Lac La Biche County; Smoky Lake County; St. Paul County
13	68,076	24,308.74	2.8	Whitecourt	Athabasca County; County of Barrhead No. 11; Lac Ste. Anne County; Thorhild County; Westlock County; Woodlands County
14	28,617	26,902.83	1.1	Hinton	Improvement District 25; Yellowhead County
15	37,735	28,270.14	1.3	Canmore	Bighorn MD; Crowsnest Pass; Improvement District 9 Improvement District 12; Jasper; Kananaskis I.D. Ranchland MD
16	74,543	94,072.31	0.8	Fort McMurray	Improvement District 24; Wood Buffalo
17	62,132	190,433.83	0.3	Slave Lake	Big Lakes County; Clear Hills County; Northern Sunrise County; Municipal District of Lesser Slave River No. 124; Mackenzie County; County of Northern Lights; Opportunity MD
18	13,226	33,104.45	0.4	Grande Cache	Greenview MD
19	121,167	20,454.38	5.9	Grande Prairie	Birch Hills County; Fairview MD; County of Grande Prairie No. 1 Peace MD; Saddle Hills County; Smoky River MD; Spirit River MD

== See also ==
- List of cities in Alberta
- List of communities in Alberta
- List of designated places in Alberta
- List of hamlets in Alberta
- List of Indian reserves in Alberta
- List of municipal districts in Alberta
- List of municipalities in Alberta
- List of population centres in Alberta
- List of summer villages in Alberta
- List of towns in Alberta
- List of villages in Alberta
- Specialized municipalities of Alberta
- Subdivisions of Canada
