= List of municipal districts in Alberta =

Municipal districts of Alberta
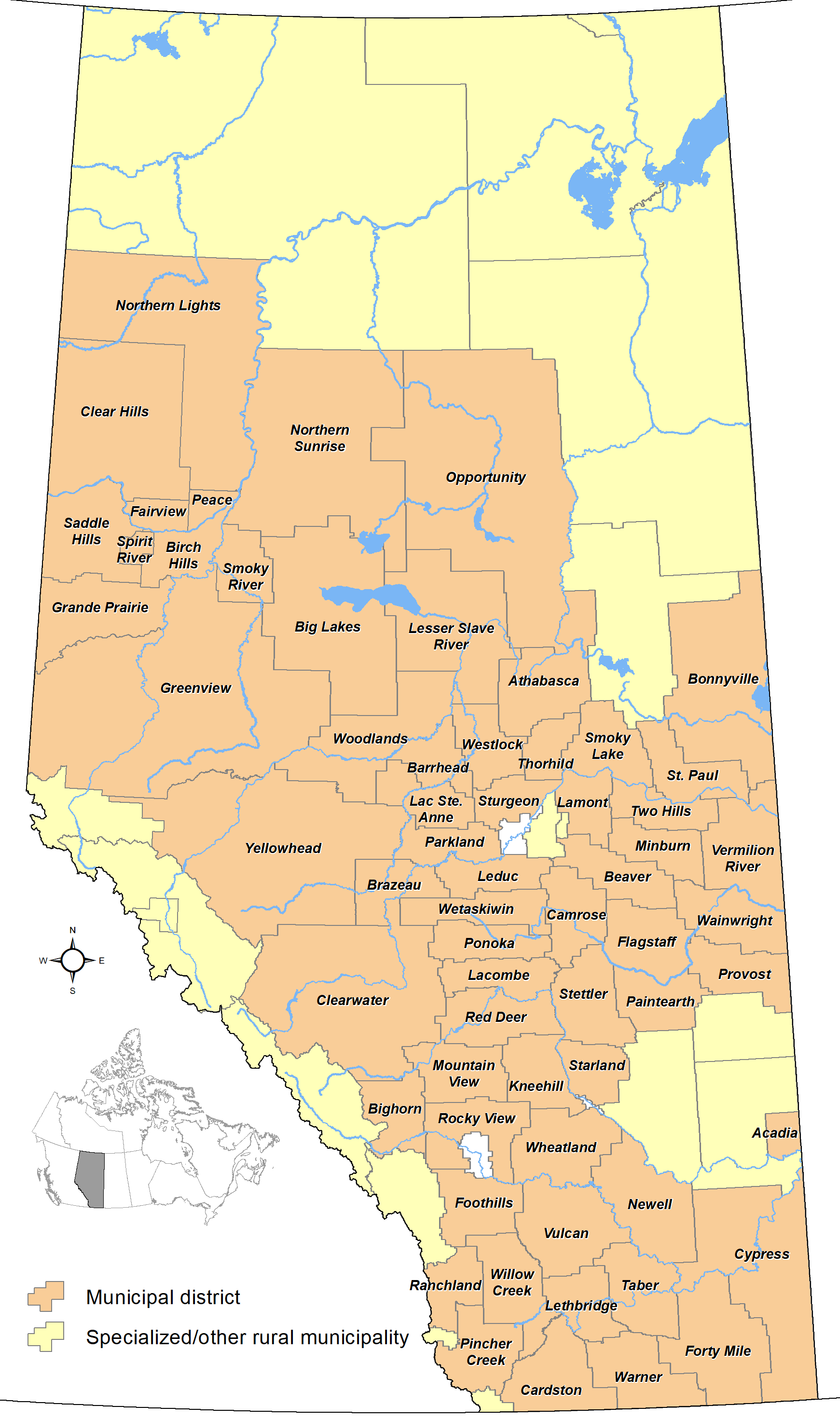
- Distribution of Alberta's 63 municipal districts
- Location: Province of Alberta
- Number: 63
- Populations: 110 (Ranchland) – 41,028 (Rocky View)
- Areas: 683.6 km^{2} (Spirit River) – 32,984.24 km^{2} (Greenview)
- Government: Municipal district
- Subdivisions: Hamlets, unincorporated communities

A municipal district (MD) is the most common form of all rural municipality statuses used in the Canadian province of Alberta. Alberta's municipal districts, most of which are branded as a county (e.g. Yellowhead County, County of Newell, etc.), are predominantly rural areas that may include either farmland, Crown land or a combination of both depending on their geographic location. They may also include country residential subdivisions and unincorporated communities, some of which are recognized as hamlets by Alberta Municipal Affairs.

Municipal districts are created when predominantly rural areas with populations of at least 1,000 people, where a majority of their residential buildings are on parcels of land greater than 1,850 m^{2}, apply to Alberta Municipal Affairs for municipal district status under the authority of the Municipal Government Act. Applications for municipal district status are approved via orders in council made by the Lieutenant Governor in Council under recommendation from the Minister of Municipal Affairs.

As of the 2011 Census, Alberta's then 64 municipal districts (Lac La Biche County has since then converted to a specialized municipality) had a cumulative population of 451,979 and an average population of 7,062. Alberta's most populous and least populated municipal districts are Rocky View County and the MD of Ranchland No. 66 with populations of 36,461 and 79 respectively.

437 elected officials (eight mayors, 56 reeves and 373 councillors) provide municipal district governance throughout the province.

== Branding ==
An order in council to incorporate any municipality must give the municipality an official name. Of Alberta's 63 municipal districts, 16 still have municipal district in their official names, while 47 of them have branded themselves as a county in their official names. Twenty-five of Alberta's municipal districts retain a numerical designation (e.g. "No. 8") in their official names.

The use of the county term in the official names of 47 municipal districts (and three specialized municipalities) has partially led to a common belief that a county is its own separate municipal status type, which is not the case. The other major contributor to this common belief is that a county was formerly a municipal status type in Alberta prior to the County Act being repealed in the mid-1990s. Those municipalities that were once officially incorporated as counties were continued under the Municipal Government Act (MGA) as municipal districts and were permitted to retain the term county in their official names.

== Municipal office locations ==
More than half of the 63 municipal districts have their main administration offices, including council chambers, in a separate municipality such as a city, town, or village. This municipality (like all other cities, towns, and villages) is not part of the municipal district's jurisdiction. Nine municipal districts have their offices in a hamlet, which is part of the district's jurisdiction. They are Acadia (Acadia Valley), Bighorn (Exshaw), Birch Hills (Wanham), Clear Hills (Worsley), Cypress (Dunmore), Grande Prairie (Clairmont), Lac Ste. Anne (Sangudo), Opportunity (Wabasca), and Thorhild (Thorhild). One municipal district, Ranchland, has its offices in a provincial park, Chain Lakes Provincial Park. Thirteen municipal districts have their offices in their jurisdiction, outside the boundaries of a city, town, or village. They are Brazeau (Drayton Valley), Lacombe (between Gull Lake and Lacombe), Mountain View (Didsbury), Newell (Brooks), Northern Sunrise (Peace River), Paintearth (Castor), Parkland (Stony Plain), Peace (Berwyn), Red Deer (Red Deer), Saddle Hills (Spirit River), Wheatland (Strathmore), Willow Creek (Claresholm), and Woodlands (Whitecourt).

== List ==
The below table is a list of only those rural municipalities in Alberta that are incorporated as municipal districts.

Despite their names, Lac La Biche County, Mackenzie County, and Strathcona County are not listed because they are in fact incorporated as specialized municipalities, not municipal districts. The Regional Municipality of Wood Buffalo is likewise a specialized municipality and is thus not listed here. For more information on specialized municipalities, see List of specialized municipalities in Alberta.

Alberta's seven improvement districts and three special areas are also not listed because they are their own separate type of rural municipality and not subset types of the municipal district status. For more information on special areas, see Special Areas Board.

List of municipal districts in Alberta
| Municipal district (MD) | Incorporation date | Census division | Council size | 2021 Census of Population | | | | |
| Municipal district (MD) | Incorporation date | Census division | Council size | Population (2021) | Population (2016) | Change | Land area (km²) | Population density (/km²) |
|---|---|---|---|---|---|---|---|---|
| MD of Acadia No. 34 | December 9, 1913 | 4 | 5 | 494 | 493 | +0.2% | 1,070.92 | 0.5 |
| Athabasca County | January 1, 1947 | 13 | 9 | 6,959 | 7,869 | −11.6% | 6,111.30 | 1.1 |
| County of Barrhead No. 11 | January 1, 1955 | 13 | 7 | 5,877 | 6,288 | −6.5% | 2,385.28 | 2.5 |
| Beaver County | February 1, 1943 | 10 | 5 | 5,868 | 5,905 | −0.6% | 3,219.74 | 1.8 |
| Big Lakes County | January 1, 1995 | 17 | 9 | 3,664 | 4,103 | −10.7% | 11,897.75 | 0.3 |
| MD of Bighorn No. 8 | January 1, 1988 | 15 | 5 | 1,598 | 1,324 | +20.7% | 2,678.80 | 0.6 |
| Birch Hills County | January 1, 1995 | 19 | 7 | 1,516 | 1,553 | −2.4% | 2,848.75 | 0.5 |
| MD of Bonnyville No. 87 | January 1, 1955 | 12 | 7 | 11,864 | 11,661 | +1.7% | 5,410.21 | 2.2 |
| Brazeau County | July 1, 1988 | 11 | 7 | 7,179 | 7,771 | −7.6% | 3,000.14 | 2.4 |
| Camrose County | January 1, 1944 | 10 | 7 | 8,504 | 8,660 | −1.8% | 3,291.75 | 2.6 |
| Cardston County | January 1, 1954 | 3 | 7 | 4,856 | 4,481 | +8.4% | 3,358.39 | 1.4 |
| Clear Hills County | January 1, 1995 | 17 | 7 | 3,006 | 3,018 | −0.4% | 15,025.54 | 0.2 |
| Clearwater County | January 1, 1985 | 9 | 7 | 11,865 | 11,947 | −0.7% | 18,605.71 | 0.6 |
| Cypress County | January 1, 1985 | 1 | 9 | 7,524 | 7,662 | −1.8% | 12,977.99 | 0.6 |
| MD of Fairview No. 136 | December 9, 1914 | 19 | 5 | 1,580 | 1,604 | −1.5% | 1,373.66 | 1.2 |
| Flagstaff County | January 1, 1944 | 7 | 7 | 3,694 | 3,728 | −0.9% | 3,959.78 | 0.9 |
| Foothills County | January 1, 1954 | 6 | 7 | 23,199 | 22,616 | +2.6% | 3,604.76 | 6.4 |
| County of Forty Mile No. 8 | January 1, 1954 | 1 | 7 | 3,471 | 3,581 | −3.1% | 7,163.61 | 0.5 |
| County of Grande Prairie No. 1 | December 21, 1943 | 19 | 9 | 23,769 | 22,502 | +5.6% | 5,790.59 | 4.1 |
| MD of Greenview No. 16 | January 1, 1994 | 18 | 8 | 8,584 | 9,154 | −6.2% | 32,925.53 | 0.3 |
| Kneehill County | January 1, 1944 | 5 | 7 | 4,992 | 5,001 | −0.2% | 3,373.40 | 1.5 |
| Lac Ste. Anne County | January 1, 1944 | 13 | 7 | 10,832 | 10,899 | −0.6% | 2,845.84 | 3.8 |
| Lacombe County | January 1, 1944 | 8 | 7 | 10,283 | 10,343 | −0.6% | 2,759.12 | 3.7 |
| Lamont County | January 1, 1944 | 10 | 5 | 3,754 | 3,884 | −3.3% | 2,385.58 | 1.6 |
| Leduc County | January 1, 1944 | 11 | 7 | 14,416 | 13,177 | +9.4% | 2,502.59 | 5.8 |
| MD of Lesser Slave River No. 124 | January 1, 1995 | 17 | 7 | 2,861 | 2,803 | +2.1% | 10,041.79 | 0.3 |
| Lethbridge County | January 1, 1954 | 2 | 7 | 10,120 | 10,237 | −1.1% | 2,815.66 | 3.6 |
| County of Minburn No. 27 | January 30, 1942 | 10 | 7 | 3,014 | 3,188 | −5.5% | 2,850.37 | 1.1 |
| Mountain View County | January 1, 1944 | 6 | 7 | 12,981 | 13,074 | −0.7% | 3,763.42 | 3.4 |
| County of Newell | January 1, 1953 | 2 | 10 | 7,465 | 7,524 | −0.8% | 5,810.15 | 1.3 |
| County of Northern Lights | January 1, 1995 | 17 | 7 | 3,601 | 3,656 | −1.5% | 18,900.57 | 0.2 |
| Northern Sunrise County | April 1, 1994 | 17 | 6 | 1,711 | 1,921 | −10.9% | 20,914.35 | 0.1 |
| MD of Opportunity No. 17 | August 1, 1995 | 17 | 11 | 3,382 | 3,253 | +4.0% | 28,857.88 | 0.1 |
| County of Paintearth No. 18 | January 1, 1944 | 7 | 7 | 1,990 | 2,102 | −5.3% | 3,239.58 | 0.6 |
| Parkland County | January 1, 1969 | 11 | 7 | 32,205 | 32,737 | −1.6% | 2,375.67 | 13.6 |
| MD of Peace No. 135 | December 11, 1916 | 19 | 5 | 1,581 | 1,752 | −9.8% | 847.22 | 1.9 |
| MD of Pincher Creek No. 9 | January 1, 1944 | 3 | 5 | 3,240 | 2,965 | +9.3% | 3,455.75 | 0.9 |
| Ponoka County | January 1, 1952 | 8 | 5 | 9,998 | 9,806 | +2.0% | 2,807.99 | 3.6 |
| MD of Provost No. 52 | March 1, 1943 | 7 | 7 | 2,071 | 2,205 | −6.1% | 3,571.12 | 0.6 |
| MD of Ranchland No. 66 | January 1, 1995 | 15 | 3 | 110 | 92 | +19.6% | 2,636.75 | 0.0 |
| Red Deer County | January 1, 1944 | 8 | 7 | 19,933 | 19,531 | +2.1% | 3,919.25 | 5.1 |
| Rocky View County | January 1, 1955 | 6 | 9 | 41,028 | 39,407 | +4.1% | 3,828.85 | 10.7 |
| Saddle Hills County | January 1, 1995 | 19 | 7 | 2,338 | 2,225 | +5.1% | 5,827.70 | 0.4 |
| Smoky Lake County | March 1, 1943 | 12 | 5 | 2,517 | 2,461 | +2.3% | 2,619.69 | 1.0 |
| MD of Smoky River No. 130 | January 1, 1952 | 19 | 6 | 1,684 | 2,006 | −16.1% | 2,834.18 | 0.6 |
| MD of Spirit River No. 133 | December 11, 1916 | 19 | 4 | 649 | 700 | −7.3% | 679.86 | 1.0 |
| County of St. Paul No. 19 | January 30, 1942 | 12 | 7 | 6,306 | 6,036 | +4.5% | 3,280.40 | 1.9 |
| Starland County | February 1, 1943 | 5 | 5 | 1,821 | 2,066 | −11.9% | 2,540.85 | 0.7 |
| County of Stettler No. 6 | March 1, 1943 | 7 | 7 | 5,666 | 5,566 | +1.8% | 3,969.65 | 1.4 |
| Sturgeon County | January 1, 1955 | 11 | 7 | 20,061 | 20,495 | −2.1% | 2,084.24 | 9.6 |
| MD of Taber | January 1, 1954 | 2 | 7 | 7,447 | 7,098 | +4.9% | 4,160.47 | 1.8 |
| Thorhild County | January 1, 1955 | 13 | 5 | 3,042 | 3,254 | −6.5% | 1,997.17 | 1.5 |
| County of Two Hills No. 21 | January 1, 1944 | 10 | 5 | 3,412 | 3,641 | −6.3% | 2,600.15 | 1.3 |
| County of Vermilion River | January 1, 1944 | 10 | 7 | 7,994 | 8,453 | −5.4% | 5,420.13 | 1.5 |
| Vulcan County | January 1, 1951 | 5 | 7 | 4,237 | 3,984 | +6.4% | 5,356.65 | 0.8 |
| MD of Wainwright No. 61 | January 30, 1942 | 7 | 7 | 4,276 | 4,464 | −4.2% | 4,095.29 | 1.0 |
| County of Warner No. 5 | January 1, 1954 | 2 | 7 | 4,290 | 3,942 | +8.8% | 4,462.20 | 1.0 |
| Westlock County | February 1, 1943 | 13 | 7 | 7,186 | 7,220 | −0.5% | 3,169.66 | 2.3 |
| County of Wetaskiwin No. 10 | February 1, 1943 | 11 | 7 | 11,212 | 11,176 | +0.3% | 3,121.98 | 3.6 |
| Wheatland County | January 1, 1955 | 5 | 7 | 8,738 | 8,788 | −0.6% | 4,505.05 | 1.9 |
| MD of Willow Creek No. 26 | January 1, 1954 | 3 | 7 | 6,081 | 5,575 | +9.1% | 4,485.05 | 1.4 |
| Woodlands County | January 1, 1994 | 13 | 7 | 4,558 | 4,744 | −3.9% | 7,599.52 | 0.6 |
| Yellowhead County | January 1, 1994 | 14 | 9 | 10,426 | 10,995 | −5.2% | 22,238.56 | 0.5 |
| Total municipal districts | — | — | 437 | 470,580 | 470,366 | 0.0% | 378,251.55 | 1.2 |

== Former municipal districts ==
Territorial evolution of Alberta's municipalities from 1955 to 2024

=== Changed status ===
| Name Earlier name(s) | Incorporation date (municipal district) | Status change date | Subsequent municipal status |
|---|---|---|---|
| Lac La Biche County | August 1, 2007 | January 1, 2018 | Specialized municipality |
| Mackenzie County; MD of Mackenzie No. 23 | January 1, 1995 | June 23, 1999 | Specialized municipality |
| Strathcona County; County of Strathcona No. 20; MD of Strathcona No. 83; MD of Strathcona No. 517 | March 1, 1943 | January 1, 1996 | Specialized municipality |

=== Dissolved ===
| Name Earlier name(s) | Incorporation date (municipal district) | Dissolution date | Subsequent municipality(ies) |
|---|---|---|---|
| Argyle No. 26; Argyle No. 100 | | January 1, 1954 | Vulcan County (1951); Municipal District of Willow Creek No. 26 (1954) |
| Argyle No. 99 | December 9, 1912 | January 1, 1944 | Argyle No. 100 |
| Arthur No. 340 | | January 1, 1944 | Red Deer County |
| Ashmont No. 605 | May 1, 1919 | | Smoky Lake County; County of St. Paul No. 19 |
| Asquith No. 394 | December 14, 1914 | January 1, 1944 | Flagstaff County |
| Badlands No. 7 | January 1, 1991 | January 1, 1998 | Drumheller (town) |
| Barons No. 25 | | January 1, 1954 | Lethbridge County (1954); Vulcan County (1951); Municipal District of Willow Creek No. 26 (1954) |
| Battle River No. 423 | December 9, 1912 | January 30, 1942 | Municipal District of Wainwright No. 61 |
| Bear Lake No. 740 | December 9, 1912 | December 21, 1943 | County of Grande Prairie No. 1 |
| Beaver Dam No. 281 | | January 1, 1944 | Mountain View County |
| Beaver Lake No. 486 | | February 1, 1943 | Beaver County |
| Beddington No. 250 | December 9, 1912 | February 1, 1943 | Beddington (Conrich) No. 220 |
| Berry Creek No. 214 | December 9, 1912 | | |
| Bertawan No. 271 | December 9, 1912 | | |
| Bigstone No. 459 | | February 1, 1943 | County of Wetaskiwin No. 10 |
| Birch Lake No. 484 | | January 30, 1942 | County of Minburn No. 27 |
| Blackfoot No. 218 | | | Bow Valley No. 40 |
| Blackie No. 30 | | January 1, 1951 | Vulcan County |
| Blackmud No. 488 | | January 1, 1944 | Leduc County |
| Blindman No. 430 | | January 1, 1944 | Ponoka County |
| Bonnyville No. 87; Bonnyville No. 572; Boucher No. 572 | December 14, 1914 | January 1, 1955 | Municipal District of Bonnyville No. 87 |
| Bow Island No. 13; Bow Island No. 94 | December 9, 1912 | January 1, 1950 | Bow Island No. 13 (enlarged) |
| Bow Island No. 13 (enlarged) | January 1, 1950 | January 1, 1954 | County of Forty Mile No. 8 |
| Bow Valley No. 40; Bow Valley No. 218 | December 9, 1912 | January 1, 1955 | County of Newell (1953); Wheatland County (1955) |
| Bright No. 16; Bright No. 69 | | January 1, 1954 | Lethbridge County; Municipal District of Willow Creek No. 26 |
| Britannia No. 183 | December 10, 1917 | | |
| Buffalo Coulee No. 453 | | January 30, 1942 | County of Minburn No. 27 |
| Bulyea No. 215 | December 14, 1914 | | |
| Burlington No. 2 Burlington No. 34 | December 9, 1912 | January 1, 1950 | Burlington No. 2 (enlarged) |
| Burlington No. 2 (enlarged) | January 1, 1950 | January 1, 1954 | County of Forty Mile No. 8 County of Warner No. 5 |
| Canmer No. 301 | December 9, 1912 | | |
| Carbon No. 278 | December 9, 1912 | January 1, 1944 | Kneehill County |
| Cartier No. 103; Cartier No. 637 | December 14, 1914 | January 1, 1947 | Athabasca County |
| Castle River No. 40 | | January 1, 1944 | Municipal District of Pincher Creek No. 9 |
| Cereal No. 242 | December 9, 1912 | | |
| Champlain No. 544 | | January 30, 1942 | County of St. Paul No. 19 |
| Chip Lake No. 553 | December 14, 1914 | | |
| Clear Lake No. 129 | | January 1, 1944 | Argyle No. 100 |
| Clifton No. 127 | December 14, 1914 | | |
| Clover Bar No. 517 | | March 1, 1943 | Strathcona County |
| Cochrane No. 6 Cochrane No. 10 | December 14, 1914 | January 1, 1954 | Cardston County |
| Cochrane No. 7 | | January 1, 1946 | Cochrane No. 6 |
| Collholme No. 243 | December 9, 1912 | | |
| Columbia No. 460 | | | Improvement District No. 76 |
| Conrich No. 44; Conrich No. 220; Beddington No. 220 | | January 1, 1955 | Rocky View County |
| Cornhill No. 487 | December 9, 1912 | February 1, 1943 | Beaver County |
| Coronation No. 334; Whiteside No. 334 | December 8, 1913 | January 1, 1944 | County of Paintearth No. 18 |
| Crown No. 399 | | January 1, 1944 | Lacombe County |
| Dinton No. 189 | December 9, 1912 | | Blackie No. 30 |
| Dowling Lake No. 305 | December 9, 1912 | | |
| Dublin No. 366 | | March 1, 1943 | County of Stettler No. 6 |
| Eagle No. 545 | | January 1, 1944 | County of Two Hills No. 21 |
| Edson No. 555 | December 9, 1912 | | |
| Ethelwyn No. 512 | | January 1, 1944 | County of Vermilion River |
| Eureka No. 14; Eureka No. 65 | December 9, 1912 | January 1, 1954 | Municipal District of Taber |
| Evergreen No. 427 | | | Camrose County |
| Excelsior No. 92 | December 9, 1912 | | |
| Fertile Valley No. 429 | | January 1, 1944 | Ponoka County |
| Flagstaff No. 364; Flagstaff No. 394 | December 9, 1912 | January 1, 1944 | Flagstaff County |
| Flowerdale No. 244 | December 8, 1913 | | |
| Flowery Plain No. 33 | December 9, 1912 | | Burlington No. 2 |
| Forty Mile No. 12; Forty Mile No. 64 | December 9, 1912 | January 1, 1950 | Bow Island No. 13; Burlington No. 2 |
| Gariepy No. 574 | December 14, 1914 | | |
| Ghost Pine No. 308; Roach No. 308 | December 9, 1912 | January 1, 1944 | Kneehill County |
| Gilt Edge No. 422 | | January 30, 1942 | Municipal District of Wainwright No. 61 |
| Glendon No. 88 | | January 1, 1955 | Municipal District of Bonnyville No. 87 |
| Golden Centre No. 272 | December 9, 1912 | | |
| Golden West No. 371 | | January 1, 1944 | Red Deer County |
| Grande Prairie No. 739; Grande Prairie No. 709 | December 9, 1912 | December 21, 1943 | County of Grande Prairie No. 1 |
| Grasswold No. 248 | December 9, 1914 | | Serviceberry No. 43 |
| Grizzly Bear No. 452 | December 8, 1913 | January 1, 1944 | County of Vermilion River (1944); Municipal District of Wainwright No. 61 (1942) |
| Grosmont No. 106; Grosmont No. 668 | December 14, 1914 | January 1, 1947 | Athabasca County |
| Haig No. 396 | | | Camrose County |
| Hand Hills No. 275 | December 9, 1912 | | |
| Harmony No. 128 | | | Vulcan No. 29 |
| Hays No. 338 | December 9, 1912 | January 1, 1944 | Red Deer County |
| Hazelwood No. 579 | | February 1, 1943 | Westlock County |
| Highwood No. 31; Highwood No. 159 | January 1, 1944 | January 1, 1954 | Municipal District of Foothills No. 31; Municipal District of Willow Creek No. 26 |
| Hillcrest No. 362 | December 9, 1912 | March 1, 1943 | Municipal District of Provost No. 52 |
| Hiram No. 304; Misqueta Valley No. 304 | December 9, 1912 | | |
| Huamha No. 393 | December 9, 1912 | | Municipal District of Provost No. 52 |
| Inga No. 520 | March 1, 1918 | January 30, 1942 | Stony Plain No. 84 |
| Iron Creek No. 455 | | February 1, 1943 | Beaver County |
| Keoma No. 249 | December 9, 1912 | | Serviceberry No. 43 |
| Kerr No. 39 | | January 1, 1944 | Municipal District of Pincher Creek No. 9 |
| King No. 153 | December 9, 1912 | | |
| Kinsella No. 424 | | January 1, 1944 | Flagstaff County |
| Kitchener No. 582 | December 14, 1914 | January 1, 1944 | Lac Ste. Anne County |
| Lac Ste. Anne No. 93 | | January 1, 1955 | Sturgeon County |
| Lakeland County | July 1, 1998 | August 1, 2007 | Lac La Biche County |
| Lakeside No. 397 | | | Camrose County |
| Lakeview No. 454 | December 8, 1913 | January 30, 1942 | County of Minburn No. 27 |
| Lambton No. 306 | December 9, 1912 | February 1, 1943 | Starland County |
| Lamerton No. 398 | | January 1, 1944 | Lacombe County |
| Last West No. 67; Last West No. 431 | | | |
| Laurier No. 543 | December 14, 1914 | January 30, 1942 | County of St. Paul No. 19 |
| Leslie No. 547 | | January 1, 1944 | Lamont County |
| Liberty No. 489 | | January 1, 1944 | Leduc County |
| Lincoln No. 542 | December 14, 1914 | January 30, 1942 | County of St. Paul No. 19 |
| Little Bow No. 98 | December 8, 1913 | | Barons No. 25 |
| Livingstone No. 70 | | January 1, 1944 | Municipal District of Pincher Creek No. 9 |
| Lloyd George No. 457 | | | Camrose County |
| Lochearn No. 401 | | | Improvement District No. 65 |
| Lockerbie No. 580 | | February 1, 1943 | Westlock County |
| Lonebutte No. 245 | December 9, 1912 | | |
| Lorne No. 400 | | January 1, 1944 | Lacombe County |
| Marquis No. 157 | December 9, 1912 | | Blackie No. 30; Vulcan No. 29; Bow West Area |
| McLean No. 96 | December 9, 1912 | | |
| Melberta No. 483 | | January 30, 1942 | County of Minburn No. 27 |
| Melrose No. 426 | | | Camrose County |
| Merton No. 451 | December 14, 1914 | January 1, 1944 | County of Vermilion River (1944); Municipal District of Wainwright No. 61 (1942) |
| Michichi No. 277 | | February 1, 1943 | Starland County |
| Montgomery No. 458 | December 13, 1915 | February 1, 1943 | County of Wetaskiwin No. 10 |
| Morinville No. 91 | | January 1, 1955 | Sturgeon County |
| Morthen No. 551 | | January 1, 1944 | Lac Ste. Anne County |
| Mountain View No. 310 | December 9, 1912 | January 1, 1944 | Mountain View County |
| Nelson No. 105; Nelson No. 638 | December 14, 1914 | January 1, 1947 | Athabasca County |
| Newell No. 28 | February 10, 1948 | January 1, 1953 | County of Newell |
| Norma No. 515 | | January 1, 1944 | County of Two Hills No. 21 |
| Norquay No. 279 | | January 1, 1944 | Kneehill County |
| Opal No. 578 | | February 1, 1943 | Bon Accord (Sturgeon) No. 548 |
| Parkland No. 456 | December 11, 1916 | February 1, 1943 | Beaver County |
| Patricia No. 486 | | February 1, 1943 | Beaver County |
| Paxson No. 667 | December 14, 1914 | | |
| Pembina No. 94; Pembina No. 552 | | | |
| Pershing No. 581 | | January 1, 1944 | Lac Ste. Anne County |
| Pibroch No. 609 | December 9, 1912 | February 1, 1943 | Westlock County |
| Pine Lake No. 339 | | January 1, 1944 | Red Deer County |
| The Pines No. 516 | | January 1, 1944 | Lamont County |
| Pioneer No. 490 | December 9, 1912 | January 1, 1944 | Leduc County |
| Poplar Grove No. 341 | | January 1, 1944 | Red Deer County |
| Prairie Creek No. 343 | | | |
| Progress No. 365 | | January 1, 1944 | County of Paintearth No. 18 |
| Raven No. 57; Raven No. 342 | | | |
| Ray No. 549 | | | Morinville No. 91 |
| Ribstone No. 421 | December 8, 1913 | January 30, 1942 | Municipal District of Wainwright No. 61 |
| Richdale No. 274 | December 9, 1912 | | |
| Riley No. 159 | | January 1, 1944 | Highwood No. 31 |
| Rocky Rapids No. 522 | December 13, 1915 | April 1, 1937 | Improvement District No. 522 |
| Rosebud No. 280 | December 8, 1913 | January 1, 1944 | Mountain View County |
| Rosenheim No. 361 | December 9, 1912 | | |
| Royal No. 158 | | | Vulcan No. 29 |
| Serviceberry No. 43 | | January 1, 1955 | Rocky View County; Wheatland County |
| Sheep Creek No. 190 | | January 1, 1944 | Highwood No. 31 |
| Shepard No. 220 | | February 1, 1943 | Beddington (Conrich) No. 220 |
| Shoal Creek No. 610 | | February 1, 1943 | Westlock County |
| Sifton No. 391 | December 9, 1912 | March 1, 1943 | Municipal District of Provost No. 52 |
| Smoky Lake No. 576 | | March 1, 1943 | Smoky Lake County |
| Sobor No. 514 | | January 1, 1944 | County of Two Hills No. 21 |
| Sounding Creek No. 273 | December 9, 1912 | | |
| Springbank No. 45; Springbank No. 221 | | January 1, 1955 | Municipal District of Foothills No. 31 (1954); Rocky View County (1955) |
| Spruce Grove No. 519 | December 13, 1915 | January 30, 1942 | Stony Plain No. 84 |
| St. Lina No. 574 | | | County of St. Paul No. 19 |
| St. Vincent No. 88; St. Vincent No. 573 | | | |
| Starland No. 307 | December 9, 1912 | February 1, 1943 | Starland County |
| Stauffer No. 309 | | January 1, 1944 | Kneehill County |
| Stewart No. 302 | December 9, 1912 | | |
| Stirling No. 425 | December 9, 1912 | January 1, 1944 | Flagstaff County |
| Stockland No. 191 | | | Turner Valley No. 32 |
| Stocks No. 363 | | January 1, 1944 | County of Paintearth No. 18 |
| Stony Plain No. 84; Stony Plain No. 520 | | January 1, 1969 | Parkland County |
| Strathcona No. 518 | | March 1, 1943 | Strathcona County |
| Streamstown No. 511 | December 9, 1912 | January 1, 1944 | County of Vermilion River |
| Sturgeon No. 548 | | February 1, 1943 | Bon Accord (Sturgeon) No. 548 |
| Sturgeon River No. 90; Sturgeon No. 548; Bon Accord No. 548 | | January 1, 1955 | Sturgeon County |
| Success No. 336 | December 9, 1912 | March 1, 1943 | County of Stettler No. 6 |
| Sugar City No. 5 Sugar City No. 37 | | January 1, 1954 | Cardston County; Lethbridge County; County of Warner No. 5 |
| Sullivan Lake No. 335 | December 9, 1912 | | |
| Sunny South No. 123 | December 9, 1912 | | |
| Tawatinaw No. 608 | December 14, 1914 | February 1, 1943 | Westlock County |
| Tomahawk No. 521 | December 9, 1912 | January 30, 1942 | Stony Plain No. 84 |
| Turner Valley No. 32 | | January 1, 1954 | Municipal District of Foothills No. 31; Municipal District of Willow Creek No. 26 |
| Ukraina No. 513 | | January 1, 1944 | County of Two Hills No. 21 |
| Unity No. 577 | | March 1, 1943 | Smoky Lake County |
| Vale No. 392 | December 8, 1913 | January 30, 1942 | Municipal District of Wainwright No. 61 |
| Vermilion Valley No. 482 | December 8, 1913 | January 1, 1944 | County of Vermilion River |
| Vilna No. 575; Wasel No. 575 | | March 1, 1943 | Smoky Lake County |
| Vimy No. 337 | | March 1, 1943 | County of Stettler No. 6 |
| Vulcan No. 29; Vulcan No. 128 | | January 1, 1951 | Vulcan County |
| Warner No. 4 Warner No. 36 | December 9, 1912 | January 1, 1950 | Warner No. 4 (enlarged) |
| Warner No. 4 (enlarged) | January 1, 1950 | January 1, 1954 | County of Forty Mile No. 8 Lethbridge County; County of Warner No. 5 |
| Water Glen No. 428 | | January 1, 1944 | Ponoka County |
| Waterloo No. 56; Waterloo No. 312 | December 8, 1913 | | |
| Waverly No. 367 | | March 1, 1943 | County of Stettler No. 6 |
| Wellington No. 481 | December 9, 1912 | January 1, 1944 | County of Vermilion River |
| Westerdale No. 311 | December 8, 1913 | January 1, 1944 | Mountain View County |
| Wheatland No. 395 | December 9, 1912 | January 1, 1944 | Flagstaff County |
| Wiste No. 303 | December 9, 1912 | | |
| Woodford No. 550 | | January 1, 1944 | Lac Ste. Anne County |
| Wostok No. 546 | | January 1, 1944 | Lamont County |

== See also ==
- Administrative divisions of Canada
- List of census divisions of Alberta
- List of communities in Alberta
- List of designated places in Alberta
- List of hamlets in Alberta
- List of Indian reserves in Alberta
- List of municipalities in Alberta
- List of rural municipalities in Manitoba
- List of rural municipalities in Saskatchewan
- List of specialized municipalities in Alberta
- Special Areas Board
