= List of municipalities in Alberta =

Location of Alberta in Canada

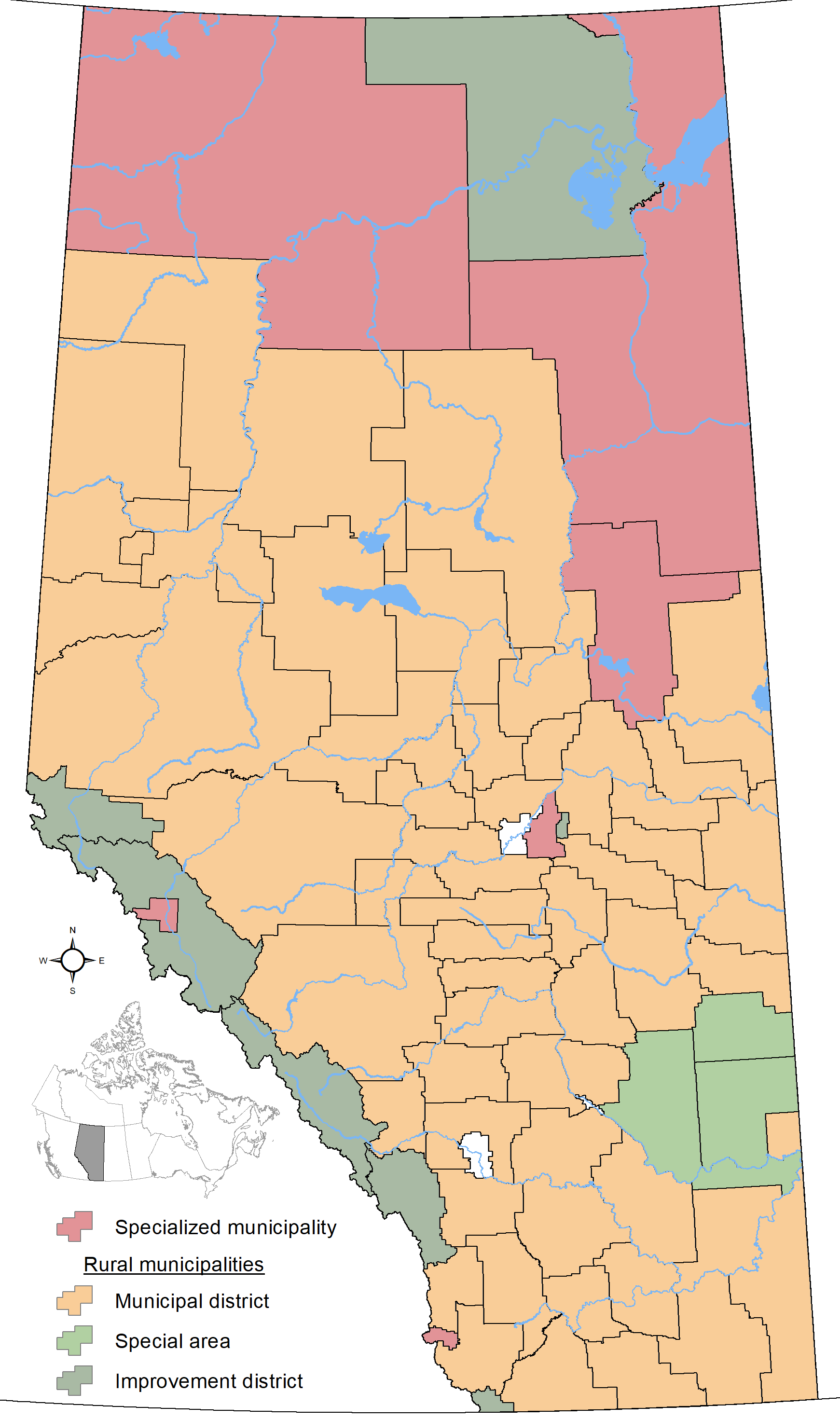
Distribution of Alberta's 6 specialized municipalities (red) and 73 rural municipalities, which include municipal districts (orange), improvement districts (dark green) and special areas (light green)

Alberta is the fourth-most populous province in Canada with 4,262,635 residents as of 2021 Census of Population and is the fourth-largest in land area at 634,658 km^{2} (245,043 mi^{2}). Alberta's 344 municipalities cover 99.7% of the province's land mass and are home to 99% of its population. (Note: Alberta's Indian reserves and settlements account for the rest.) These municipalities provide local government services, including roads, water, sewer and garbage collection among others, and a variety of programs to their residents.

According to the Municipal Government Act (MGA), which was enacted in 2000, a municipality in Alberta is "a city, town, village, summer village, municipal district or specialized municipality, a town under the Parks Towns Act, or a municipality formed by special Act". The MGA also recognizes improvement districts and special areas as municipal authorities while Metis settlements are recognized as municipalities by the Government of Alberta's Ministry of Municipal Affairs. Cities, towns, villages, summer villages, municipal districts, specialized municipalities and improvement districts are formed under the provincial authority of the MGA. Special areas and Metis settlements are formed under the provincial authority of the Special Areas Act (SAA) and the Metis Settlements Act (MSA) respectively, of which both were enacted in 2000. As provincial law, the MGA, the SAA and the MSA were passed by the Legislative Assembly of Alberta with royal assent granted by the Lieutenant Governor.

Of Alberta's 341 municipalities, 253 of them are urban municipalities (19 cities, 105 towns, 78 villages and 51 summer villages), 6 are specialized municipalities, 73 are rural municipalities (63 municipal districts, 7 improvement districts and 3 special areas) and 8 are Metis settlements. The MGA, the SAA and the MSA stipulate governance of these municipalities. Alberta's Ministry of Municipal Affairs is responsible for providing provincial services to municipalities.

Over half of Alberta's population resides in its two largest cities. Calgary, the largest city, is home to 30.7% of the province's population (1,306,784 residents), while Edmonton, Alberta's capital city, is home to 23.7% (1,010,899 residents). Improvement District No. 13 (Elk Island). Improvement District No. 12 (Jasper National Park) and Improvement District No. 25 (Willmore Wilderness) are Alberta's smallest municipalities by population; they are unpopulated according to the 2021 Census of Population. (Note: Actual population may not be 0 as Statistics Canada, to protect privacy, rounds population to the nearest 5 in the event a geographic area's actual population is less than 15.) The largest municipality by land area is Mackenzie County at 79,629.26 km^{2} (30,745.03 mi^{2}), while the smallest by land area is the Summer Village of Castle Island at 0.05 km^{2} (0.019 mi^{2}).

== Urban municipalities ==
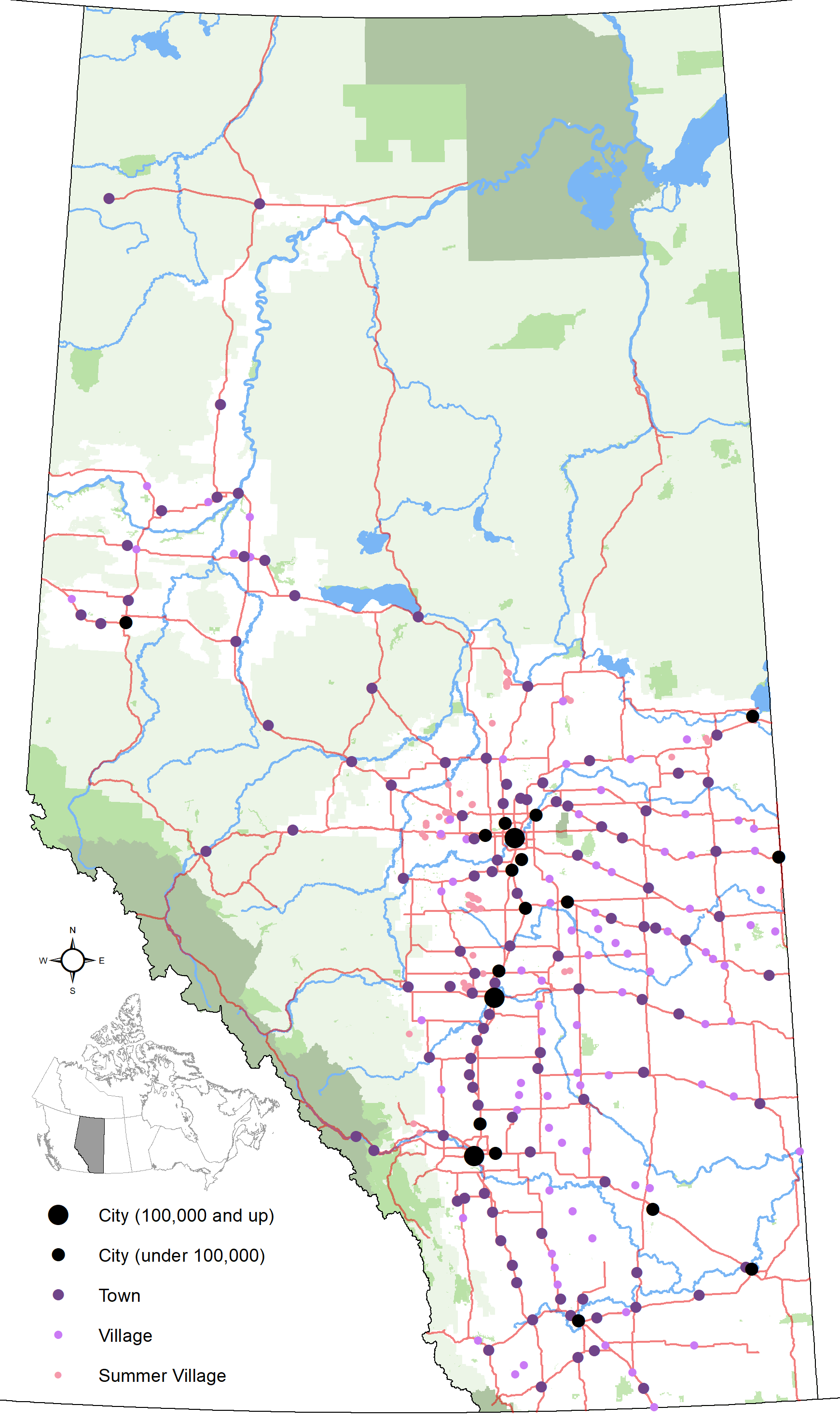
Distribution of Alberta's 260 urban municipalities including 19 cities (black), 106 towns (dark purple), 81 villages (light purple) and 51 summer villages (pink) (2011)

Alberta's Municipal Government Act (MGA), enacted in 2000, defines urban municipality as a "city, town, village or summer village." For federal census purposes, Statistics Canada recognizes all four urban municipality types as census subdivisions.

Combined, Alberta has 257 urban municipalities comprising 19 cities, 106 towns, 81 villages and 51 summer villages. The 257 urban municipalities have a total population of 3,533,377, a total land area of 4,052.34 km^{2} (1,564.62 mi^{2}). These totals represent 83% of Alberta's population yet only 0.6% of its land area.

=== Cities ===
The MGA previously stipulated that an area may incorporate as a city if it has a population of 10,000 people or more and the majority of its buildings are on parcels of land smaller than 1,850 m^{2} (19,900 sq ft). Bill 21 amended the MGA in 2022 to remove these two city status requirements.

Alberta has 19 cities that had a cumulative population of 3,023,641 in the 2021 Census of Population. These 19 cities include Lloydminster, of which a portion is located within the neighbouring province of Saskatchewan. Alberta's largest city by population and land area is Calgary with 1,306,784 and 820.62 km^{2} (316.84 sq mi), while Wetaskiwin is its smallest city by population with 12,594 and land area at 18.75 km^{2} (7.24 sq mi). Beaumont is Alberta's newest city; it became Alberta's 19th city on January 1, 2019.

=== Towns ===
The MGA previously stipulated that an area may incorporate as a town if it has a population of 1,000 people or more and the majority of its buildings are on parcels of land smaller than 1,850 m^{2} (19,900 sq ft). Bill 21 amended the MGA in 2022 to remove these two town status requirements.

Alberta has 105 towns that had a cumulative population of 471,028 in the 2021 Census of Population. The province's largest and smallest towns by population are Cochrane and Rainbow Lake with 32,199 and 495 respectively, while its largest and smallest by land area are Drumheller and Eckville with 107.56 km^{2} (41.53 sq mi) and 1.61 km^{2} (0.62 sq mi) respectively. Diamond Valley is Alberta's newest town, formed by the amalgamation of Black Diamond and Turner Valley on January 1, 2023.

=== Villages ===
The MGA previously stipulated that an area may incorporate as a village if it has a population of 300 people or more and the majority of its buildings are on parcels of land smaller than 1,850 m^{2} (19,900 sq ft). Bill 21 amended the MGA in 2022 to remove these two village status requirements.

Alberta has 79 villages that had a cumulative population of 32,191 in the 2021 Census of Population. The province's largest and smallest villages by population are Stirling and Edberg with 1,164 and 126 respectively, while its largest and smallest by land area are Chipman and Edberg with 9.60 km^{2} (3.71 sq mi) and 0.35 km^{2} (0.14 sq mi) respectively. The last communities to incorporate as villages were Alberta Beach and Spring Lake, which both changed from summer villages to villages on January 1, 1999.

=== Summer villages ===
Under previous legislation, a community could incorporate as a summer village if it had "a minimum of 50 separate buildings occupied as dwellings at any time during a six-month period". A community can no longer incorporate as a summer village under the MGA.

Alberta has 51 summer villages that had a cumulative population of 5,955 in the 2021 Census of Population. The province's largest summer village by population is Norglenwold with 306, while Castle Island is Alberta's smallest summer village with a population of 15. The province's largest and smallest summer villages by land area are Silver Sands and Castle Island with 2.51 km^{2} (0.97 sq mi) and 0.05 km^{2} (0.019 sq mi) respectively. Gull Lake and Kapasiwin were the last communities in Alberta to incorporate as summer villages. Both were incorporated on September 1, 1993. Since then, two summer villages have incorporated as villages (Alberta Beach and Edmonton Beach, now named Spring Lake) and one has dissolved (White Gull).

=== List of urban municipalities ===
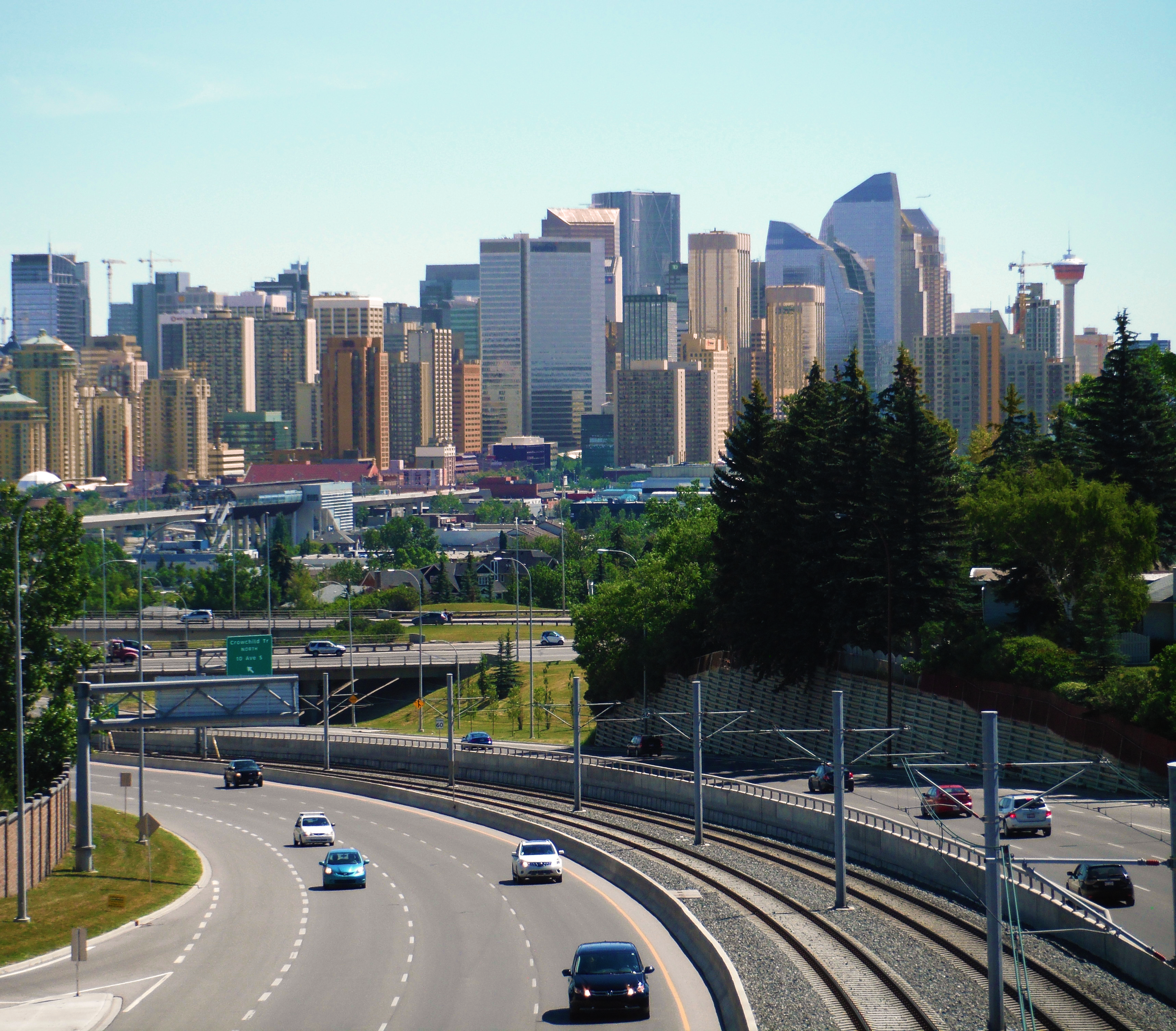
Calgary, Alberta's largest city

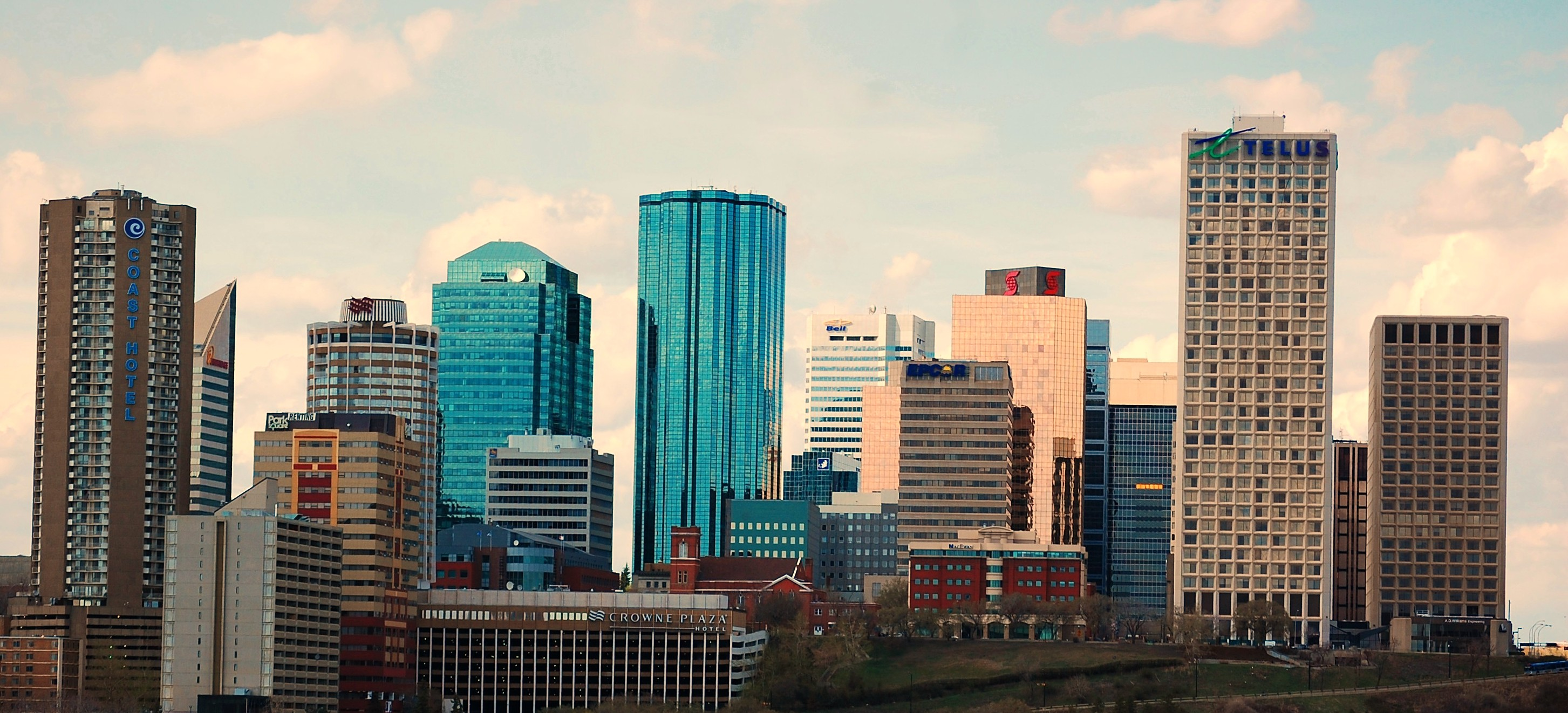
Edmonton, Alberta's capital and second largest city

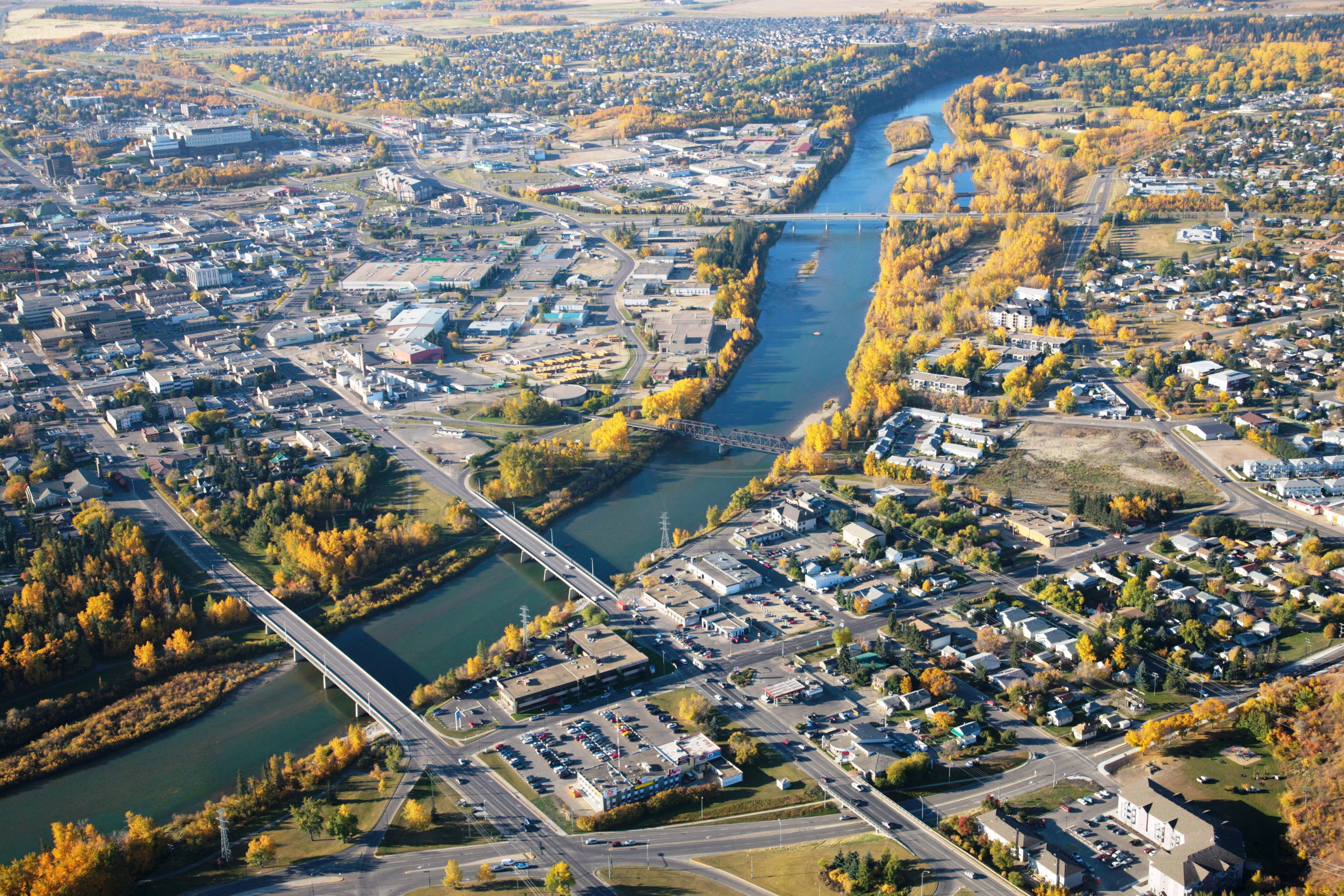
Red Deer, Alberta's third largest city, is located at the midpoint between Calgary and Edmonton.

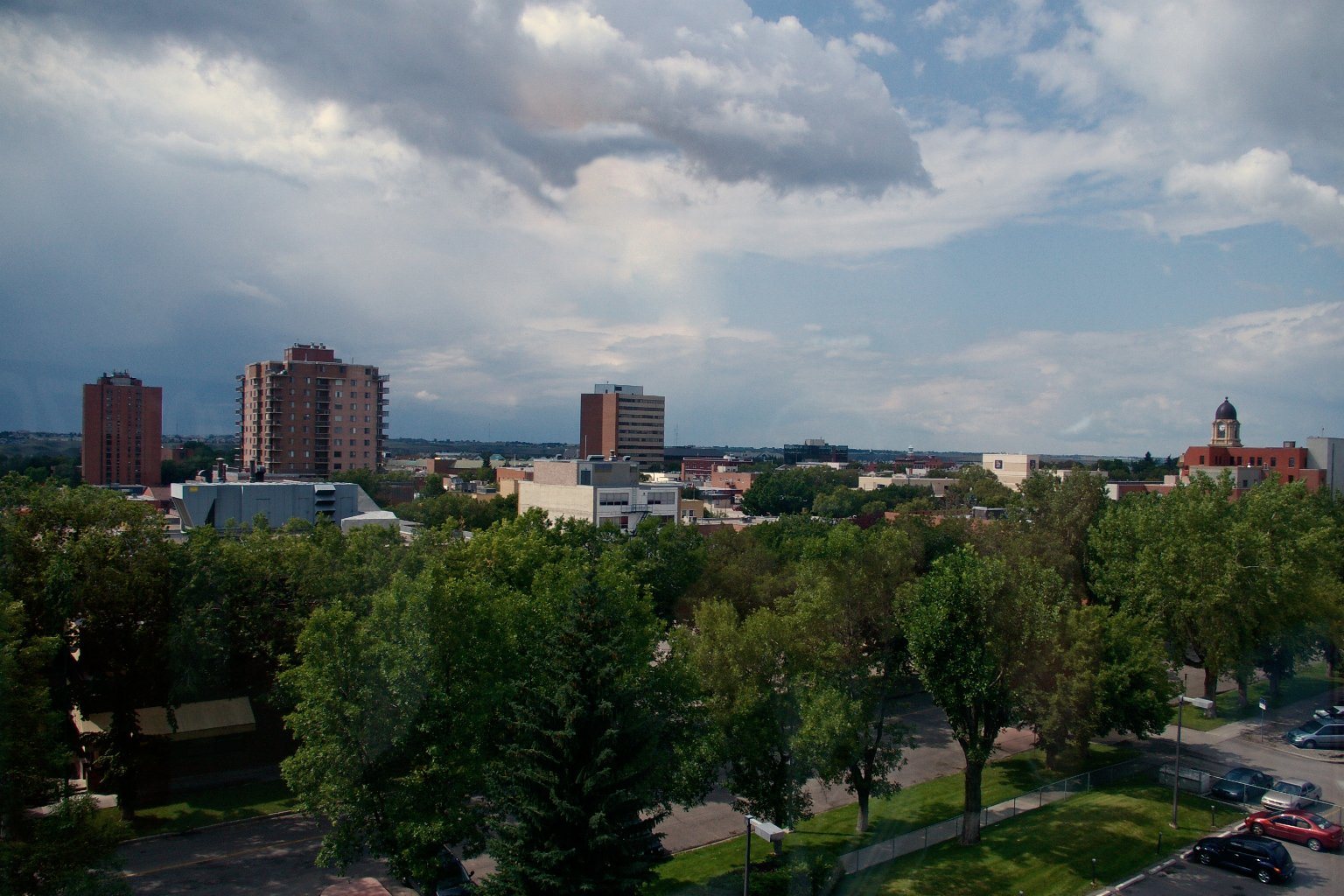
Lethbridge is Alberta's fourth largest city.

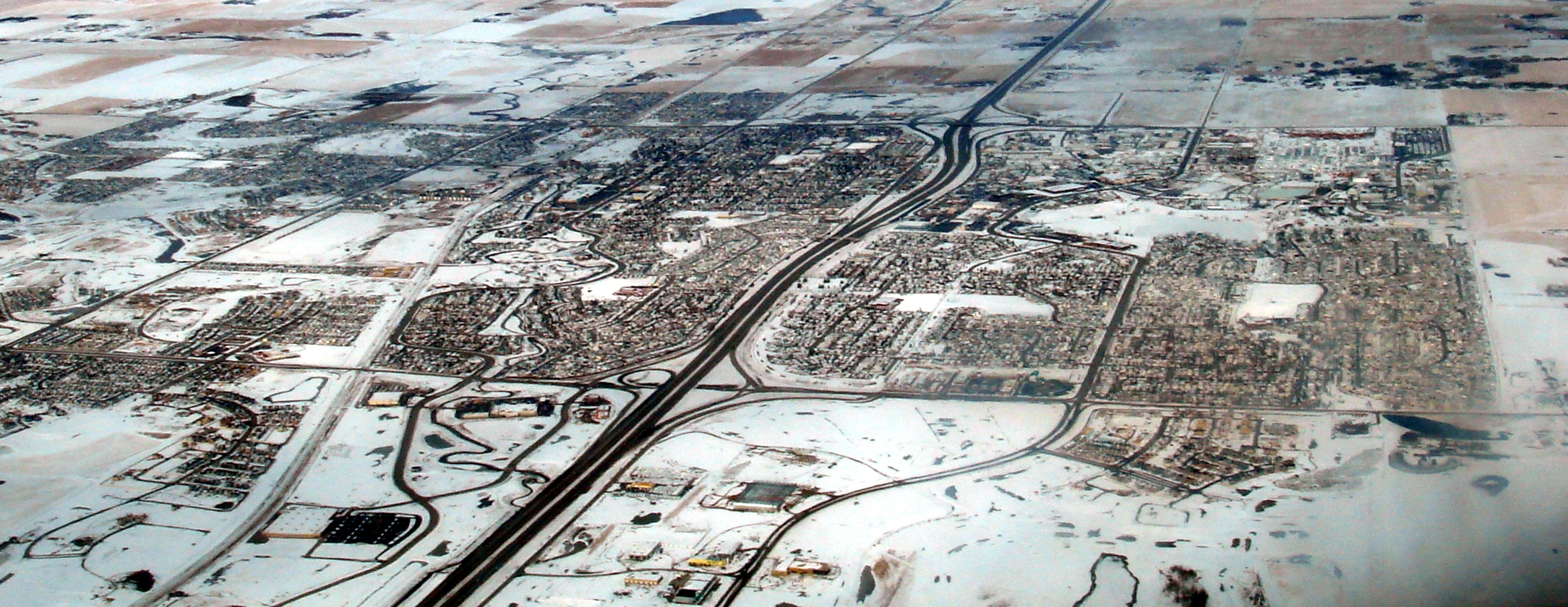
Airdrie, Alberta's fifth largest city, is located adjacent to Calgary.

List of urban municipalities in Alberta
Name	Status	Incorporation date (current status)	2021 Census of Population				
Name	Status	Incorporation date (current status)	Population (2021)	Population (2016)	Change (%)	Land area (km^{2})	Population density (/km^{2})
Acme	Village	July 7, 1910	606	653	−7.2%	2.49	243.4
Airdrie	City	January 1, 1985	74,100	61,581	+20.3%	84.39	878.1
Alberta Beach	Village	January 1, 1999	864	1,018	−15.1%	2.02	427.7
Alix	Village	June 3, 1907	774	734	+5.4%	3.11	248.9
Alliance	Village	August 26, 1918	166	159	+4.4%	0.62	267.7
Amisk	Village	January 1, 1956	219	204	+7.4%	0.76	288.2
Andrew	Village	June 24, 1930	366	425	−13.9%	1.18	310.2
Argentia Beach	Summer village	January 1, 1967	39	27	+44.4%	0.62	62.9
Arrowwood	Village	May 13, 1926	188	207	−9.2%	0.75	250.7
Athabasca	Town	September 19, 1911	2,759	2,965	−6.9%	17.79	155.1
Banff	Town	January 1, 1990	8,305	7,851	+5.8%	4.08	2,035.5
Barnwell	Village	January 1, 1980	978	947	+3.3%	1.50	652.0
Barons	Village	May 6, 1910	313	341	−8.2%	0.81	386.4
Barrhead	Town	November 26, 1946	4,320	4,579	−5.7%	8.20	526.8
Bashaw	Town	May 1, 1964	848	830	+2.2%	2.72	311.8
Bassano	Town	January 16, 1911	1,216	1,206	+0.8%	5.23	232.5
Bawlf	Village	October 12, 1906	412	422	−2.4%	0.89	462.9
Beaumont	City	January 1, 2019	20,888	17,457	+19.7%	24.70	845.7
Beaverlodge	Town	January 24, 1956	2,271	2,465	−7.9%	5.38	422.1
Beiseker	Village	February 23, 1921	754	819	−7.9%	2.85	264.6
Bentley	Town	January 1, 2001	1,042	1,078	−3.3%	2.24	465.2
Berwyn	Village	November 28, 1936	577	538	+7.2%	1.57	367.5
Betula Beach	Summer village	January 1, 1960	27	16	+68.8%	0.23	117.4
Big Valley	Village	March 9, 1942	331	346	−4.3%	1.86	178.0
Birch Cove	Summer village	December 31, 1988	67	45	+48.9%	0.29	231.0
Birchcliff	Summer village	January 1, 1972	211	117	+80.3%	0.97	217.5
Bittern Lake	Village	November 2, 1904	216	220	−1.8%	6.57	32.9
Blackfalds	Town	April 1, 1980	10,470	9,328	+12.2%	16.58	631.5
Bon Accord	Town	November 20, 1979	1,461	1,529	−4.4%	3.99	366.2
Bondiss	Summer village	January 1, 1983	124	110	+12.7%	1.18	105.1
Bonnyville	Town	February 3, 1948	6,404	5,975	+7.2%	14.17	451.9
Bonnyville Beach	Summer village	January 1, 1958	70	84	−16.7%	0.23	304.3
Bow Island	Town	February 1, 1912	2,036	1,983	+2.7%	5.68	358.5
Bowden	Town	September 1, 1981	1,280	1,240	+3.2%	3.46	369.9
Boyle	Village	December 31, 1953	825	845	−2.4%	7.12	115.9
Breton	Village	January 1, 1957	567	574	−1.2%	1.72	329.7
Brooks	City	September 1, 2005	14,924	14,451	+3.3%	18.21	819.5
Bruderheim	Town	September 17, 1980	1,329	1,323	+0.5%	9.28	143.2
Burnstick Lake	Summer village	December 31, 1991	21	15	+40.0%	0.18	116.7
Calgary	City	January 1, 1894	1,306,784	1,239,220	+5.5%	820.62	1,592.4
Calmar	Town	January 19, 1954	2,183	2,228	−2.0%	4.67	467.5
Camrose	City	January 1, 1955	18,772	18,742	+0.2%	41.67	450.5
Canmore	Town	June 1, 1966	15,990	13,992	+14.3%	68.47	233.5
Carbon	Village	November 18, 1912	492	454	+8.4%	1.99	247.2
Cardston	Town	July 2, 1901	3,724	3,585	+3.9%	8.58	434.0
Carmangay	Village	March 4, 1936	269	242	+11.2%	1.80	149.4
Carstairs	Town	September 1, 1966	4,898	4,077	+20.1%	11.77	416.1
Castle Island	Summer village	January 1, 1955	15	10	+50.0%	0.05	300.0
Castor	Town	June 27, 1910	803	929	−13.6%	2.61	307.7
Champion	Village	May 27, 1911	351	317	+10.7%	0.88	398.9
Chauvin	Village	December 30, 1912	304	335	−9.3%	2.22	136.9
Chestermere	City	January 1, 2015	22,163	19,887	+11.4%	32.83	675.1
Chipman	Village	October 21, 1913	246	274	−10.2%	9.60	25.6
Claresholm	Town	August 31, 1905	3,804	3,790	+0.4%	10.51	361.9
Clive	Village	January 9, 1912	775	715	+8.4%	2.17	357.1
Clyde	Village	January 28, 1914	415	430	−3.5%	1.28	324.2
Coaldale	Town	January 7, 1952	8,771	8,331	+5.3%	13.58	645.9
Coalhurst	Town	June 1, 1995	2,869	2,668	+7.5%	3.08	931.5
Cochrane	Town	February 15, 1971	32,199	25,853	+24.5%	31.58	1,019.6
Cold Lake	City	October 1, 2000	15,661	14,976	+4.6%	66.61	235.1
Consort	Village	September 23, 1912	644	729	−11.7%	3.02	213.2
Coronation	Town	April 29, 1912	868	940	−7.7%	3.57	243.1
Coutts	Village	January 1, 1960	224	245	−8.6%	1.18	189.8
Cowley	Village	August 16, 1906	216	209	+3.3%	1.36	158.8
Cremona	Village	January 1, 1955	437	444	−1.6%	1.93	226.4
Crossfield	Town	August 1, 1980	3,599	2,983	+20.7%	11.89	302.7
Crystal Springs	Summer village	January 1, 1957	74	51	+45.1%	0.45	164.4
Czar	Village	November 12, 1917	248	202	+22.8%	1.12	221.4
Daysland	Town	April 2, 1907	789	824	−4.2%	1.77	445.8
Delburne	Village	January 17, 1913	919	892	+3.0%	3.79	242.5
Delia	Village	July 20, 1914	152	216	−29.6%	1.33	114.3
Devon	Town	February 24, 1950	6,545	6,578	−0.5%	14.26	459.0
Diamond Valley	Town	January 1, 2023	5,341	5,264	+1.5%	12.57	424.9
Didsbury	Town	September 27, 1906	5,070	5,268	−3.8%	16.12	314.5
Donalda	Village	December 30, 1912	226	219	+3.2%	0.97	233.0
Donnelly	Village	January 1, 1956	338	359	−5.8%	1.26	268.3
Drayton Valley	Town	February 1, 1957	7,291	7,235	+0.8%	30.90	236.0
Drumheller	Town	January 1, 1998	7,909	7,982	−0.9%	107.56	73.5
Duchess	Village	May 12, 1921	1,053	1,085	−2.9%	1.93	545.6
Eckville	Town	July 1, 1966	1,014	1,125	−9.9%	1.61	629.8
Edberg	Village	February 4, 1930	126	151	−16.6%	0.35	360.0
Edgerton	Village	September 11, 1917	385	384	+0.3%	2.01	191.5
Edmonton	City	October 8, 1904	1,010,899	933,088	+8.3%	765.61	1,320.4
Edson	Town	September 21, 1911	8,374	8,414	−0.5%	29.43	284.5
Elk Point	Town	January 1, 1962	1,399	1,452	−3.7%	4.91	284.9
Elnora	Village	July 22, 1929	288	298	−3.4%	1.50	192.0
Empress	Village	February 5, 1914	148	135	+9.6%	1.58	93.7
Fairview	Town	April 25, 1949	2,817	2,998	−6.0%	10.67	264.0
Falher	Town	January 1, 1955	1,001	1,047	−4.4%	2.83	353.7
Foremost	Village	December 31, 1950	630	541	+16.5%	2.13	295.8
Forestburg	Village	August 21, 1919	807	880	−8.3%	4.04	199.8
Fort Macleod	Town	March 29, 1912	3,297	2,967	+11.1%	22.54	146.3
Fort Saskatchewan	City	July 1, 1985	27,088	24,169	+12.1%	56.50	479.4
Fox Creek	Town	September 1, 1983	1,639	1,971	−16.8%	12.26	133.7
Ghost Lake	Summer village	December 31, 1953	82	82	0.0%	0.62	132.3
Gibbons	Town	April 1, 1977	3,218	3,159	+1.9%	9.46	340.2
Girouxville	Village	December 31, 1951	278	219	+26.9%	0.66	421.2
Glendon	Village	January 1, 1956	338	493	−31.4%	1.99	169.8
Glenwood	Village	January 1, 1961	272	316	−13.9%	1.37	198.5
Golden Days	Summer village	January 1, 1965	248	160	+55.0%	2.13	116.4
Grande Prairie	City	January 1, 1958	64,141	63,166	+1.5%	132.71	483.3
Grandview	Summer village	January 1, 1967	143	109	+31.2%	0.45	317.8
Grimshaw	Town	February 2, 1953	2,601	2,718	−4.3%	7.08	367.4
Gull Lake	Summer village	September 1, 1993	226	176	+28.4%	0.70	322.9
Half Moon Bay	Summer village	January 1, 1978	65	42	+54.8%	0.12	541.7
Hanna	Town	April 14, 1914	2,394	2,559	−6.4%	8.40	285.0
Hardisty	Town	November 9, 1910	548	554	−1.1%	4.50	121.8
Hay Lakes	Village	April 17, 1928	456	495	−7.9%	0.59	772.9
Heisler	Village	January 1, 1961	135	160	−15.6%	0.63	214.3
High Level	Town	September 1, 1983	3,922	3,159	+24.2%	28.70	136.7
High Prairie	Town	January 10, 1950	2,380	2,564	−7.2%	7.01	339.5
High River	Town	February 12, 1906	14,324	13,594	+5.4%	22.19	645.5
Hill Spring	Village	January 1, 1961	168	162	+3.7%	0.96	175.0
Hines Creek	Village	December 31, 1951	335	346	−3.2%	4.88	68.6
Hinton	Town	December 29, 1958	9,817	9,882	−0.7%	33.32	294.6
Holden	Village	April 14, 1909	338	350	−3.4%	1.55	218.1
Horseshoe Bay	Summer village	January 1, 1985	81	49	+65.3%	0.98	82.7
Hughenden	Village	December 27, 1917	213	243	−12.3%	0.78	273.1
Hussar	Village	April 20, 1928	164	190	−13.7%	0.70	234.3
Innisfail	Town	November 20, 1903	7,985	7,847	+1.8%	19.39	411.8
Innisfree	Village	March 11, 1911	187	193	−3.1%	1.00	187.0
Irma	Village	May 30, 1912	477	521	−8.4%	1.32	361.4
Irricana	Town	June 9, 2005	1,179	1,216	−3.0%	3.23	365.0
Island Lake	Summer village	January 1, 1958	174	228	−23.7%	1.55	112.3
Island Lake South	Summer village	January 1, 1983	81	61	+32.8%	0.48	168.8
Itaska Beach	Summer village	June 30, 1953	30	23	+30.4%	0.26	115.4
Jarvis Bay	Summer village	January 1, 1986	213	213	0.0%	0.55	387.3
Kapasiwin	Summer village	September 1, 1993	24	10	+140.0%	0.33	72.7
Killam	Town	May 1, 1965	918	989	−7.2%	6.40	143.4
Kitscoty	Village	March 22, 1911	852	925	−7.9%	1.51	564.2
Lacombe	City	September 5, 2010	13,396	13,057	+2.6%	20.59	650.6
Lakeview	Summer village	October 25, 1913	29	30	−3.3%	0.32	90.6
Lamont	Town	May 31, 1968	1,744	1,774	−1.7%	9.14	190.8
Larkspur	Summer village	January 1, 1985	53	44	+20.5%	0.26	203.8
Leduc	City	September 1, 1983	34,094	29,993	+13.7%	42.25	807.0
Legal	Town	January 1, 1998	1,232	1,345	−8.4%	3.18	387.4
Lethbridge	City	May 9, 1906	98,406	92,729	+6.1%	121.12	812.5
Linden	Village	January 1, 1964	704	828	−15.0%	2.55	276.1
Lloydminster (part)	City	January 1, 1958	19,739	19,645	+0.5%	23.98	823.1
Lomond	Village	February 16, 1916	178	166	+7.2%	1.19	149.6
Longview	Village	January 1, 1964	297	307	−3.3%	1.10	270.0
Lougheed	Village	November 7, 1911	225	256	−12.1%	2.00	112.5
Magrath	Town	July 24, 1907	2,481	2,374	+4.5%	5.88	421.9
Ma-Me-O Beach	Summer village	December 31, 1948	162	110	+47.3%	0.56	289.3
Manning	Town	January 1, 1957	1,126	1,183	−4.8%	3.71	303.5
Mannville	Village	December 29, 1906	765	828	−7.6%	1.64	466.5
Marwayne	Village	December 31, 1952	543	564	−3.7%	1.60	339.4
Mayerthorpe	Town	March 20, 1961	1,259	1,320	−4.6%	4.39	286.8
McLennan	Town	February 11, 1948	695	701	−0.9%	3.58	194.1
Medicine Hat	City	May 9, 1906	63,271	63,260	0.0%	111.97	565.1
Mewatha Beach	Summer village	January 1, 1978	103	90	+14.4%	0.79	130.4
Milk River	Town	February 7, 1956	824	827	−0.4%	2.42	340.5
Millet	Town	September 1, 1983	1,890	1,955	−3.3%	6.62	285.5
Milo	Village	May 7, 1931	136	91	+49.5%	0.96	141.7
Morinville	Town	April 21, 1911	10,385	9,848	+5.5%	11.15	931.4
Morrin	Village	April 16, 1920	205	240	−14.6%	0.67	306.0
Mundare	Town	January 4, 1951	689	852	−19.1%	4.12	167.2
Munson	Village	May 5, 1911	170	192	−11.5%	2.56	66.4
Myrnam	Village	August 22, 1930	257	339	−24.2%	2.75	93.5
Nakamun Park	Summer village	January 1, 1966	78	96	−18.7%	0.43	181.4
Nampa	Village	January 1, 1958	367	364	+0.8%	1.69	217.2
Nanton	Town	August 9, 1907	2,167	2,181	−0.6%	5.11	424.1
Nobleford	Town	February 28, 2018	1,438	1,278	+12.5%	1.69	850.9
Norglenwold	Summer village	January 1, 1965	306	273	+12.1%	0.62	493.5
Norris Beach	Summer village	December 31, 1988	71	38	+86.8%	0.19	373.7
Okotoks	Town	June 1, 1904	30,405	29,016	+4.8%	38.55	788.7
Olds	Town	July 1, 1905	9,209	9,184	+0.3%	14.92	617.2
Onoway	Town	September 1, 2005	966	1,029	−6.1%	3.31	291.8
Oyen	Town	September 1, 1965	917	1,001	−8.4%	5.15	178.1
Paradise Valley	Village	January 1, 1964	153	179	−14.5%	0.63	242.9
Parkland Beach	Summer village	January 1, 1984	168	153	+9.8%	0.94	178.7
Peace River	Town	December 1, 1919	6,619	6,842	−3.3%	25.34	261.2
Pelican Narrows	Summer village	July 1, 1979	158	151	+4.6%	0.74	213.5
Penhold	Town	September 1, 1980	3,484	3,287	+6.0%	11.20	311.1
Picture Butte	Town	January 1, 1960	1,930	1,810	+6.6%	3.02	639.1
Pincher Creek	Town	May 12, 1906	3,622	3,642	−0.5%	9.87	367.0
Point Alison	Summer village	December 31, 1950	18	10	+80.0%	0.19	94.7
Ponoka	Town	October 15, 1904	7,331	7,229	+1.4%	17.22	425.7
Poplar Bay	Summer village	January 1, 1967	113	103	+9.7%	0.71	159.2
Provost	Town	December 29, 1952	1,900	1,998	−4.9%	4.75	400.0
Rainbow Lake	Town	September 1, 1995	495	795	−37.7%	10.76	46.0
Raymond	Town	July 1, 1903	4,199	3,713	+13.1%	7.63	550.3
Red Deer	City	March 25, 1913	100,844	100,418	+0.4%	104.34	966.5
Redcliff	Town	August 5, 1912	5,581	5,600	−0.3%	16.15	345.6
Redwater	Town	December 31, 1950	2,115	2,053	+3.0%	19.93	106.1
Rimbey	Town	December 13, 1948	2,470	2,567	−3.8%	11.38	217.0
Rochon Sands	Summer village	May 17, 1929	97	86	+12.8%	2.03	47.8
Rocky Mountain House	Town	August 31, 1939	6,765	6,635	+2.0%	13.05	518.4
Rockyford	Village	March 28, 1919	395	316	+25.0%	1.04	379.8
Rosalind	Village	January 1, 1966	162	188	−13.8%	0.62	261.3
Rosemary	Village	December 31, 1951	370	396	−6.6%	0.59	627.1
Ross Haven	Summer village	January 1, 1962	126	160	−21.3%	0.70	180.0
Rycroft	Village	March 15, 1944	550	612	−10.1%	1.85	297.3
Ryley	Village	April 2, 1910	484	483	+0.2%	2.53	191.3
Sandy Beach	Summer village	January 1, 1956	278	278	0.0%	2.41	115.4
Seba Beach	Summer village	August 20, 1920	229	169	+35.5%	0.53	432.1
Sedgewick	Town	May 1, 1966	761	811	−6.2%	2.71	280.8
Sexsmith	Town	October 15, 1979	2,427	2,620	−7.4%	13.01	186.5
Silver Beach	Summer village	December 31, 1953	55	65	−15.4%	0.61	90.2
Silver Sands	Summer village	January 1, 1969	214	160	+33.7%	2.51	85.3
Slave Lake	Town	August 2, 1965	6,836	6,651	+2.8%	14.31	477.7
Smoky Lake	Town	February 1, 1962	1,127	964	+16.9%	4.26	264.6
South Baptiste	Summer village	January 1, 1983	70	66	+6.1%	0.91	76.9
South View	Summer village	January 1, 1970	72	67	+7.5%	0.44	163.6
Spirit River	Town	September 18, 1951	849	995	−14.7%	3.11	273.0
Spring Lake	Village	January 1, 1999	711	699	+1.7%	2.28	311.8
Spruce Grove	City	March 1, 1986	37,645	34,108	+10.4%	37.52	1,003.3
St. Albert	City	January 1, 1977	68,232	65,589	+4.0%	47.84	1,426.3
St. Paul	Town	December 15, 1936	5,863	5,827	+0.6%	8.64	678.6
Standard	Village	April 29, 1922	353	353	0.0%	2.34	150.9
Stavely	Town	May 25, 1912	544	541	+0.6%	1.78	305.6
Stettler	Town	November 23, 1906	5,695	5,952	−4.3%	13.19	431.8
Stirling	Village	September 3, 1901	1,164	978	+19.0%	2.70	431.1
Stony Plain	Town	December 10, 1908	17,993	17,189	+4.7%	35.45	507.6
Strathmore	Town	July 6, 1911	14,339	13,756	+4.2%	26.98	531.5
Sunbreaker Cove	Summer village	December 31, 1990	131	81	+61.7%	0.47	278.7
Sundance Beach	Summer village	January 1, 1970	42	73	−42.5%	0.43	97.7
Sundre	Town	January 1, 1956	2,672	2,729	−2.1%	10.84	246.5
Sunrise Beach	Summer village	December 31, 1988	153	135	+13.3%	1.66	92.2
Sunset Beach	Summer village	May 1, 1977	55	49	+12.2%	0.87	63.2
Sunset Point	Summer village	January 1, 1959	257	169	+52.1%	1.17	219.7
Swan Hills	Town	January 1, 1967	1,201	1,301	−7.7%	25.87	46.4
Sylvan Lake	Town	May 20, 1946	15,995	14,816	+8.0%	23.09	692.7
Taber	Town	July 1, 1907	8,862	8,428	+5.1%	19.32	458.7
Thorsby	Town	January 1, 2017	967	985	−1.8%	3.80	254.5
Three Hills	Town	January 1, 1929	3,042	3,212	−5.3%	6.74	451.3
Tofield	Town	September 10, 1909	2,045	2,081	−1.7%	8.21	249.1
Trochu	Town	August 1, 1962	998	1,058	−5.7%	2.78	359.0
Two Hills	Town	January 1, 1955	1,416	1,352	+4.7%	3.11	455.3
Val Quentin	Summer village	January 1, 1966	158	252	−37.3%	0.29	544.8
Valleyview	Town	February 5, 1957	1,673	1,863	−10.2%	9.17	182.4
Vauxhall	Town	January 1, 1961	1,286	1,222	+5.2%	2.71	474.5
Vegreville	Town	August 15, 1906	5,689	5,708	−0.3%	14.08	404.0
Vermilion	Town	August 27, 1906	3,948	4,084	−3.3%	12.72	310.4
Veteran	Village	June 30, 1914	214	207	+3.4%	0.84	254.8
Viking	Town	November 10, 1952	986	1,083	−9.0%	3.45	285.8
Vilna	Village	June 23, 1923	268	290	−7.6%	0.96	279.2
Vulcan	Town	June 15, 1921	1,769	1,917	−7.7%	6.28	281.7
Wainwright	Town	July 14, 1910	6,606	6,285	+5.1%	12.17	542.8
Waiparous	Summer village	January 1, 1986	57	49	+16.3%	0.41	139.0
Warburg	Village	December 31, 1953	676	766	−11.7%	2.56	264.1
Warner	Village	November 12, 1908	364	373	−2.4%	1.16	313.8
Waskatenau	Village	May 19, 1932	247	186	+32.8%	0.59	418.6
Wembley	Town	August 1, 1980	1,432	1,516	−5.5%	4.74	302.1
West Baptiste	Summer village	January 1, 1983	46	38	+21.1%	0.54	85.2
West Cove	Summer village	January 1, 1963	222	149	+49.0%	1.30	170.8
Westlock	Town	January 7, 1947	4,921	5,101	−3.5%	13.37	368.1
Wetaskiwin	City	May 9, 1906	12,594	12,655	−0.5%	18.75	671.7
Whispering Hills	Summer village	January 1, 1983	128	142	−9.9%	1.64	78.0
White Sands	Summer village	January 1, 1980	174	120	+45.0%	1.61	108.1
Whitecourt	Town	December 20, 1971	9,927	10,209	−2.8%	29.51	336.4
Yellowstone	Summer village	January 1, 1965	117	137	−14.6%	0.28	417.9
Youngstown	Village	December 31, 1936	171	154	+11.0%	1.11	154.1
Sub-total cities			3,023,641	2,838,191	+6.5%	2,572.21	1,175.5
Sub-total towns			471,028	455,389	+3.4%	1,294.84	363.8
Sub-total villages			32,191	33,176	−3.0%	143.71	224.0
Sub-total summer villages			5,955	5,171	+15.2%	38.93	153.0
Total urban municipalities			3,532,815	3,331,927	+6.0%	4,049.69	871.8
Province of Alberta			4,262,075	4,066,551	+4.8%	634,655.62	6.7

== Specialized municipalities ==
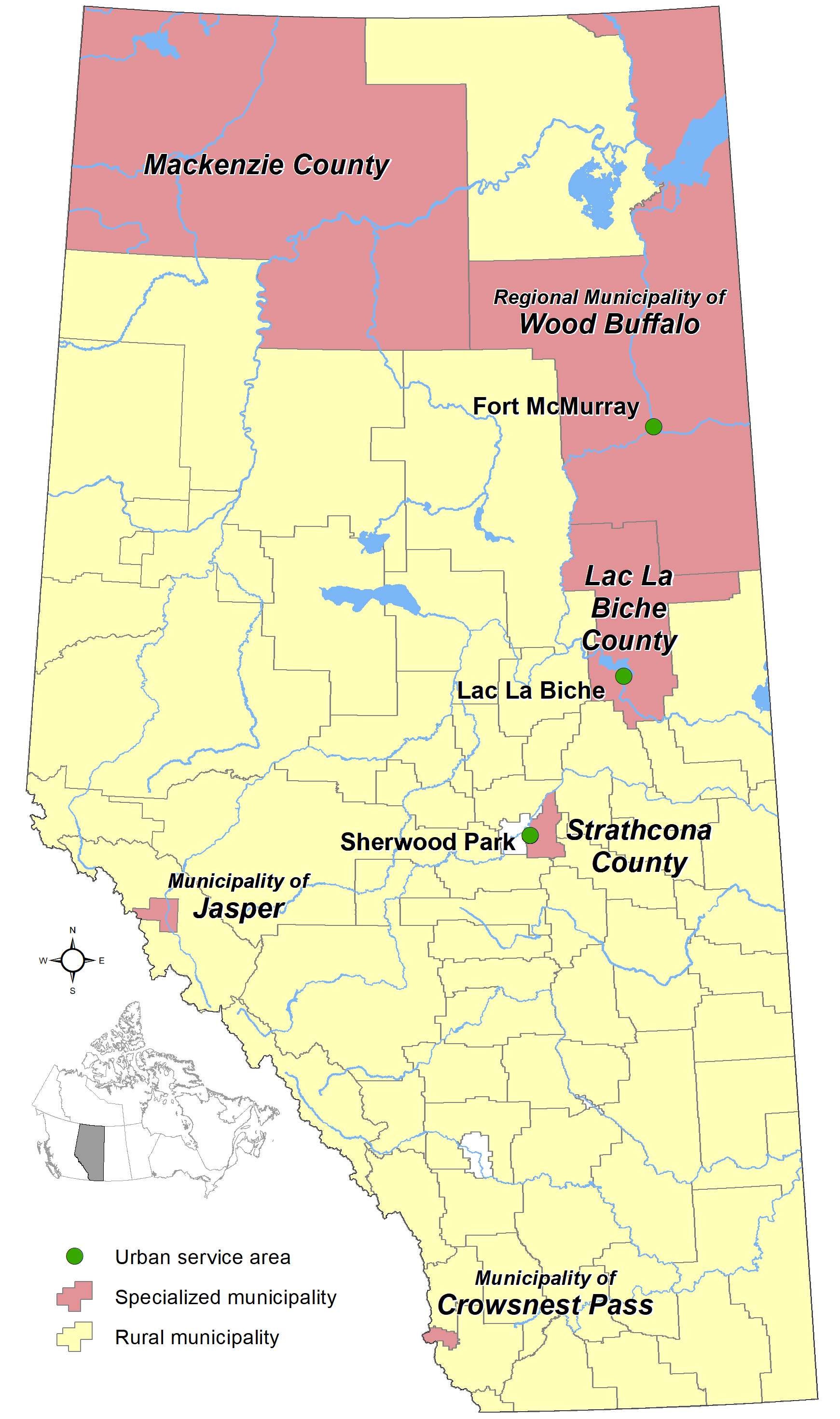
Distribution of Alberta's six specialized municipalities and three urban service areas (2020)

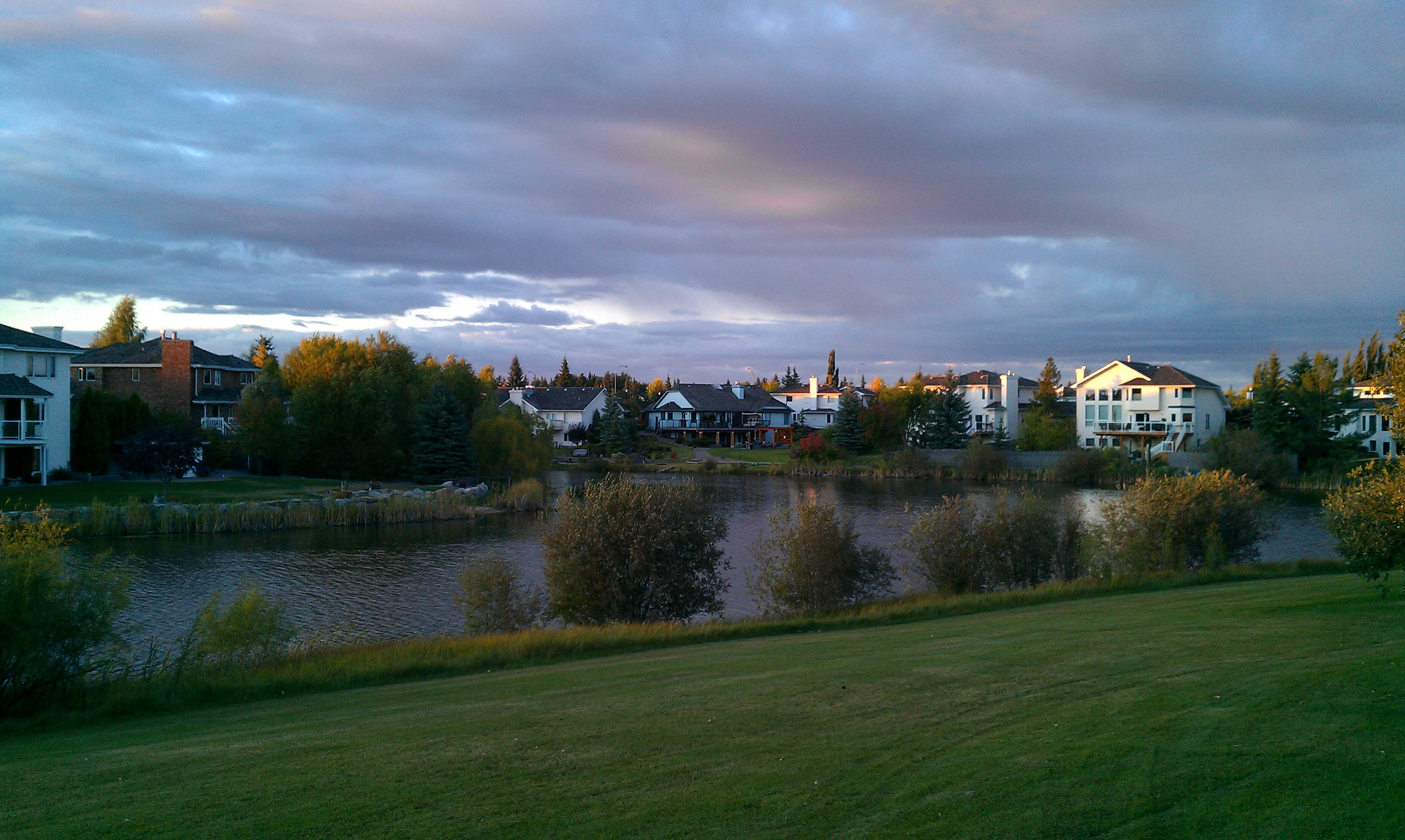
Sherwood Park is an urban service area within Strathcona County.

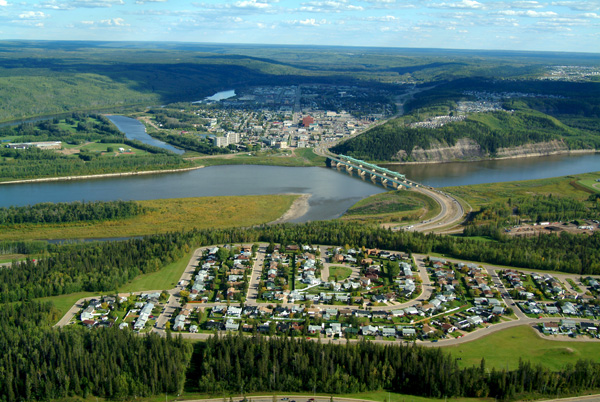
Fort McMurray is an urban service area within the Regional Municipality of Wood Buffalo.

Specialized municipalities in Alberta are unique local governments. The MGA previously stipulated that an area may incorporate as a specialized municipality under the following scenarios:

- where the Minister of Municipal Affairs is satisfied that the other incorporated statuses under the MGA do not meet the needs of the proposed municipality's residents;
- to form a local government that, in the opinion of the Minister of Municipal Affairs, will provide for the orderly development of the municipality in a similar fashion to the other incorporated statuses within the MGA, including other previously incorporated specialized municipalities; or
- for any other circumstances that are deemed appropriate by the Minister of Municipal Affairs.

Bill 21 amended the MGA in 2022 to remove these specialized municipality status requirements.

Alberta has six specialized municipalities, which are recognized as census subdivisions by Statistics Canada. In the 2021 Census of Population, they had a cumulative population of 202,461, a total land area of 155,463.32 km^{2} (60,024.72 mi^{2}). These totals represent 5% of Alberta's population yet 24.5% of its land area.

The province's largest and smallest specialized municipalities by population are Strathcona County and the Municipality of Jasper with 99,225 and 4,738 respectively, while its largest and smallest by land area are Mackenzie County and the Municipality of Crowsnest Pass with 79,629.26 km^{2} (30,745.03 sq mi) and 370.15 km^{2} (142.92 sq mi) respectively. Lac La Biche County is Alberta's newest specialized municipality, which was formed on January 1, 2018. Alberta's first specialized municipality was the Regional Municipality of Wood Buffalo, which formed on April 1, 1995.

Strathcona County and the Regional Municipality (RM) of Wood Buffalo are home to the unincorporated hamlets of Sherwood Park and Fort McMurray respectively. These communities are designated urban service areas, which are deemed equivalents of cities. Excluding Sherwood Park and Fort McMurray, 18 other unincorporated communities, also recognized as hamlets by Alberta Municipal Affairs, are distributed among Mackenzie County, Strathcona County and the RM of Wood Buffalo.

List of specialized municipalities in Alberta
Name	Region	Incorporation date (specialized municipality)	Council size	2021 Census of Population				
Name	Region	Incorporation date (specialized municipality)	Council size	Population (2021)	Population (2016)	Change	Land area (km^{2})	Population density (/km^{2})
Crowsnest Pass, Municipality of	Southern Alberta	January 16, 2008	7	5,695	5,589	+1.9%	370.15	15.4
Jasper, Municipality of	Alberta's Rockies	July 20, 2001	7	4,738	4,590	+3.2%	921.90	5.1
Lac La Biche County (Note: Excludes the unpopulated land area of the portion of the Kikino Metis Settlement that is within Lac La Biche County.)	Northern Alberta	January 1, 2018	9	7,673	8,330	−7.9%	12,527.48	0.6
Mackenzie County	Northern Alberta	June 23, 1999	10	12,804	11,171	+14.6%	79,629.26	0.2
Strathcona County	Edmonton Metro	January 1, 1996	9	99,225	98,044	+1.2%	1,170.65	84.8
Wood Buffalo, Regional Municipality of	Northern Alberta	April 1, 1995	11	72,326	71,589	+1.0%	60,843.88	1.2
Total specialized municipalities	—	—	53	202,461	199,298	+1.6%	155,463.32	1.3

== Rural municipalities ==
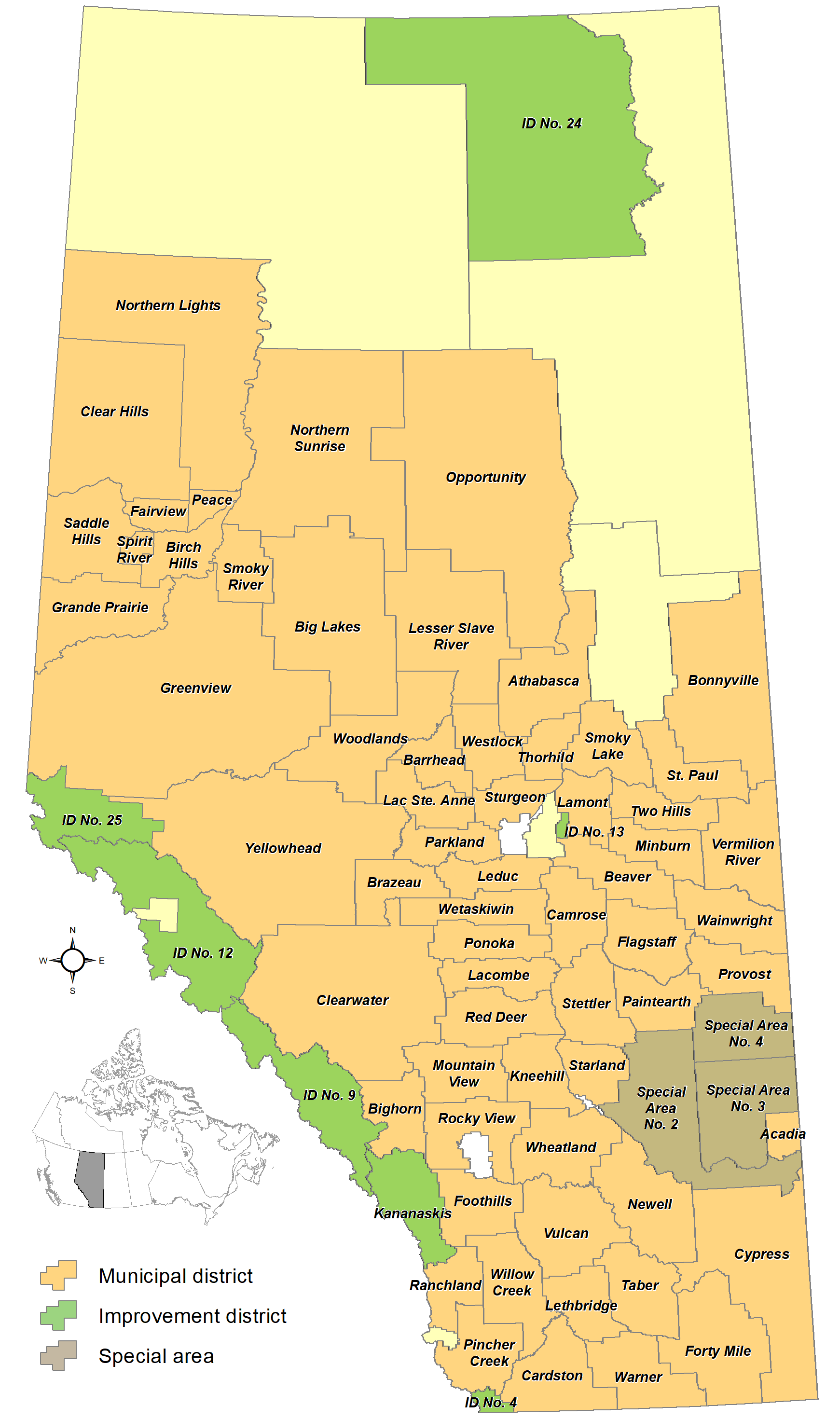
Distribution of Alberta's 73 rural municipalities as of May 2021 including 63 municipal districts (orange), 7 improvement districts (green) and 3 special areas (brown)

Rural municipalities in Alberta include municipal districts, improvement districts and special areas. For federal census purposes, Statistics Canada recognizes all three rural municipality types as census subdivisions. However, Statistics Canada embeds Alberta's eight Metis settlements, a separate type of municipality, into the census subdivisions for six municipal districts.

Combined, Alberta has 73 rural municipalities comprising 63 municipal districts, 7 improvement districts and 3 special areas. The 73 rural municipalities have a total population of 481,120, a total land area of 468,246.83 km^{2} (180,791.11 mi^{2}). (Note: Statistics presented for six municipal districts (the Big Lakes County, the MD of Bonnyville No. 87, Lac La Biche County, the County of Northern Lights, Northern Sunrise County and Smoky Lake County) differ from statistics for their corresponding census subdivisions published by Statistics Canada to recognize that Alberta's eight Metis settlements, which are designated places located within these six municipal districts, are separate municipalities. The statistics presented for total municipal districts and total rural municipalities therefore exclude the statistics associated with the eight Metis settlements.) These totals represent 11% of Alberta's population yet 73.8% of its land area.

=== Municipal districts ===
In Alberta, a municipal district, typically branded as a county, is a type of rural municipality. The MGA previously stipulated that an area may incorporate as a municipal district if it has a population of 1,000 people or more and the majority of its buildings are on parcels of land larger than 1,850 m^{2} (19,900 sq ft). Bill 21 amended the MGA in 2022 to remove these two municipal district status requirements.

Alberta has 63 municipal districts that had a cumulative population of 471,182 in the 2021 Census of Population. The province's largest and smallest municipal districts by population are Rocky View County and the Municipal District (MD) of Ranchland No. 66 with 41,028 and 110 respectively, while its largest and smallest by land area are the MD of Greenview No. 16 and the MD of Spirit River No. 133 with 32,925.53 km^{2} (12,712.62 sq mi) and 679.86 km^{2} (262.50 sq mi) respectively. Unincorporated communities recognized as hamlets by Alberta Municipal Affairs are located within every municipal district with the exception of Mountain View County, the MD of Ranchland No. 66 and the MD of Spirit River No. 133.

=== Improvement districts ===
In Alberta, an improvement district is a type of rural municipality that can be incorporated by the Lieutenant Governor in Council on the recommendation of Alberta's Minister of Municipal Affairs under the authority of the MGA. Improvement districts are administered by the province of Alberta through its Ministry of Municipal Affairs.

Alberta had eight improvement districts that had a cumulative population of 2,024 in the 2021 Census of Population. The number of improvement districts was reduced to seven on May 1, 2021, when Improvement District (ID) No. 349 dissolved by way of annexation to the MD of Bonnyville No. 87. Five of Alberta's improvement districts are within national parks while two are within provincial parks. Alberta's largest improvement district by population is ID No. 9, located within Banff National Park, with 1,004, while its largest by land area is ID No. 24, located within Wood Buffalo National Park, at 33,053.78 km^{2} (12,762.14 sq mi). ID No. 13 (Elk Island), ID No. 12 (Jasper National Park) and ID No. 25 (Willmore Wilderness) are unpopulated, while its smallest by land area is ID No. 13 (Elk Island) at 165.00 km^{2} (63.71 sq mi). Alberta Municipal Affairs recognizes two unincorporated communities within improvement districts as hamlets – Lake Louise within ID No. 9 (Banff National Park) and Waterton Park within ID No. 4 (Waterton Lakes National Park).

=== Special areas ===
In Alberta, a special area is a type of rural municipality that can be incorporated by the Lieutenant Governor in Council under the authority of the Special Areas Act, which was enacted in 2000. They were originally created in 1938 as a result of hardship brought upon a particular area in southeastern Alberta during the drought of the 1930s.

Alberta has three special areas that had a cumulative population of 4,238 in the 2021 Census of Populations. The province's largest by population and land area is Special Area (SA) No. 2 with 1,860 and 9,195.06 km^{2} (3,550.23 sq mi) respectively. Alberta's smallest by population is SA No. 3 with 1,142, while its smallest by land area is SA No. 4 with 4,299.80 km^{2} (1,660.16 sq mi). The last special area to form was SA No. 4, which incorporated on January 1, 1969, through the removal of certain lands from SA No. 3. The three special areas are administered as a single unit by the Special Areas Board, and are home to 16 unincorporated communities recognized as hamlets by Alberta Municipal Affairs.

=== List of rural municipalities ===
List of rural municipalities in Alberta
Name	Status	Incorporation date (current status)	2021 Census of Population				
Name	Status	Incorporation date (current status)	Population (2021)	Population (2016)	Change (%)	Land area (km^{2})	Population density (/km^{2})
MD of Acadia No. 34	Municipal district	December 9, 1913	494	493	+0.2%	1,070.92	0.5
Athabasca County	Municipal district	January 1, 1947	6,959	7,869	−11.6%	6,111.30	1.1
County of Barrhead No. 11	Municipal district	January 1, 1955	5,877	6,288	−6.5%	2,385.28	2.5
Beaver County	Municipal district	February 1, 1943	5,868	5,905	−0.6%	3,219.74	1.8
Big Lakes County (Note: Excludes the populations and land areas of the East Prairie and Peavine Metis settlements and the portion of the Gift Lake Metis Settlement that are within Big Lakes County.)	Municipal district	January 1, 1995	3,664	3,780	−3.1%	12,259.29	0.3
MD of Bighorn No. 8	Municipal district	January 1, 1988	1,598	1,324	+20.7%	2,678.80	0.6
Birch Hills County	Municipal district	January 1, 1995	1,516	1,553	−2.4%	2,848.75	0.5
MD of Bonnyville No. 87 (Note: Includes the population and land area of the former Improvement District No. 349 that dissolved by way of annexation to the MD of Bonnyville No. 87 on May 1, 2021.) (Note: Excludes the populations and land areas of the Elizabeth and Fishing Lake Metis settlements that are within the Municipal District of Bonnyville No. 87.)	Municipal district	January 1, 1955	12,912	12,745	+1.3%	11,631.87	1.1
Brazeau County	Municipal district	July 1, 1988	7,179	7,771	−7.6%	3,000.14	2.4
Camrose County	Municipal district	January 1, 1944	8,504	8,660	−1.8%	3,291.75	2.6
Cardston County	Municipal district	January 1, 1954	4,856	4,481	+8.4%	3,358.39	1.4
Clear Hills County	Municipal district	January 1, 1995	3,006	3,018	−0.4%	15,025.54	0.2
Clearwater County (Note: Includes the population and land area of the former Village of Caroline that amalgamated with Clearwater County on January 1, 2025.)	Municipal district	January 1, 1985	12,335	12,459	−1.0%	18,607.75	0.7
Cypress County	Municipal district	January 1, 1985	7,524	7,662	−1.8%	12,977.99	0.6
MD of Fairview No. 136	Municipal district	December 9, 1914	1,580	1,604	−1.5%	1,373.66	1.2
Flagstaff County	Municipal district	January 1, 1944	3,694	3,728	−0.9%	3,959.78	0.9
Foothills County	Municipal district	January 1, 1954	23,199	22,616	+2.6%	3,604.76	6.4
County of Forty Mile No. 8	Municipal district	January 1, 1954	3,471	3,581	−3.1%	7,163.61	0.5
County of Grande Prairie No. 1	Municipal district	December 21, 1943	23,769	22,502	+5.6%	5,790.59	4.1
MD of Greenview No. 16	Municipal district	January 1, 1994	8,584	9,154	−6.2%	32,925.53	0.3
Improvement District No. 4	Improvement district	January 1, 1944	158	105	+50.5%	482.54	0.3
Improvement District No. 9	Improvement district	April 1, 1945	1,004	1,028	−2.3%	6,751.09	0.1
Improvement District No. 12	Improvement district	April 1, 1945	0	53	−100.0%	10,118.55	0.0
Improvement District No. 13	Improvement district	April 1, 1958	0	0	NA	165.00	0.0
Improvement District No. 24	Improvement district	January 1, 1967	706	648	+9.0%	33,053.78	0.0
Improvement District No. 25	Improvement district	January 2, 1994	0	0	NA	4,601.52	0.0
Kananaskis Improvement District	Improvement district	January 1, 1983	156	221	−29.4%	4,203.24	0.0
Kneehill County	Municipal district	January 1, 1944	4,992	5,001	−0.2%	3,373.40	1.5
Lac Ste. Anne County	Municipal district	January 1, 1944	10,832	10,899	−0.6%	2,845.84	3.8
Lacombe County	Municipal district	January 1, 1944	10,283	10,343	−0.6%	2,759.12	3.7
Lamont County	Municipal district	January 1, 1944	3,754	3,884	−3.3%	2,385.58	1.6
Leduc County	Municipal district	January 1, 1944	14,416	13,177	+9.4%	2,502.59	5.8
MD of Lesser Slave River No. 124	Municipal district	January 1, 1995	2,861	2,803	+2.1%	10,041.79	0.3
Lethbridge County	Municipal district	January 1, 1954	10,120	10,237	−1.1%	2,815.66	3.6
County of Minburn No. 27	Municipal district	January 30, 1942	3,014	3,188	−5.5%	2,850.37	1.1
Mountain View County	Municipal district	January 1, 1944	12,981	13,074	−0.7%	3,763.42	3.4
County of Newell	Municipal district	January 1, 1953	7,465	7,524	−0.8%	5,810.15	1.3
County of Northern Lights (Note: Excludes the population and land area of the Paddle Prairie Metis Settlement that is within the County of Northern Lights.)	Municipal district	January 1, 1995	3,601	3,656	−1.5%	18,900.57	0.2
Northern Sunrise County (Note: Excludes the unpopulated land area of the portion of the Gift Lake Metis Settlement that is within Northern Sunrise County.)	Municipal district	April 1, 1994	1,711	1,921	−10.9%	20,914.35	0.1
MD of Opportunity No. 17	Municipal district	August 1, 1995	3,382	3,253	+4.0%	28,857.88	0.1
County of Paintearth No. 18 (Note: Includes the population and land area of the former Village of Halkirk that dissolved on January 1, 2025.)	Municipal district	January 1, 1944	2,082	2,214	−6.0%	3,240.19	0.6
Parkland County	Municipal district	January 1, 1969	32,205	32,737	−1.6%	2,375.67	13.6
MD of Peace No. 135	Municipal district	December 11, 1916	1,581	1,752	−9.8%	847.22	1.9
MD of Pincher Creek No. 9	Municipal district	January 1, 1944	3,240	2,965	+9.3%	3,455.75	0.9
Ponoka County	Municipal district	January 1, 1952	9,998	9,806	+2.0%	2,807.99	3.6
MD of Provost No. 52	Municipal district	March 1, 1943	2,071	2,205	−6.1%	3,571.12	0.6
MD of Ranchland No. 66	Municipal district	January 1, 1995	110	92	+19.6%	2,636.75	0.0
Red Deer County	Municipal district	January 1, 1944	19,933	19,531	+2.1%	3,919.25	5.1
Rocky View County	Municipal district	January 1, 1955	41,028	39,407	+4.1%	3,828.85	10.7
Saddle Hills County	Municipal district	January 1, 1995	2,338	2,225	+5.1%	5,827.70	0.4
Smoky Lake County (Note: Excludes the populations and land areas of the Buffalo Lake Metis Settlement and the portion of the Kikino Metis Settlement that are within Smoky Lake County.)	Municipal district	March 1, 1943	2,939	3,145	−6.6%	2,265.41	1.3
MD of Smoky River No. 130	Municipal district	January 1, 1952	1,684	2,006	−16.1%	2,834.18	0.6
Special Area No. 2	Special area	April 7, 1959	1,860	1,905	−2.4%	9,195.06	0.2
Special Area No. 3	Special area	April 7, 1959	1,142	1,153	−1.0%	6,469.33	0.2
Special Area No. 4	Special area	January 1, 1969	1,236	1,237	−0.1%	4,299.80	0.3
MD of Spirit River No. 133	Municipal district	December 11, 1916	649	700	−7.3%	679.86	1.0
County of St. Paul No. 19	Municipal district	January 30, 1942	6,306	6,036	+4.5%	3,280.40	1.9
Starland County	Municipal district	February 1, 1943	1,821	2,066	−11.9%	2,540.85	0.7
County of Stettler No. 6	Municipal district	March 1, 1943	5,666	5,566	+1.8%	3,969.65	1.4
Sturgeon County	Municipal district	January 1, 1955	20,061	20,495	−2.1%	2,084.24	9.6
MD of Taber	Municipal district	January 1, 1954	7,447	7,098	+4.9%	4,160.47	1.8
Thorhild County	Municipal district	January 1, 1955	3,042	3,254	−6.5%	1,997.17	1.5
County of Two Hills No. 21	Municipal district	January 1, 1944	3,412	3,641	−6.3%	2,600.15	1.3
County of Vermilion River	Municipal district	January 1, 1944	7,994	8,453	−5.4%	5,420.13	1.5
Vulcan County	Municipal district	January 1, 1951	4,237	3,984	+6.4%	5,356.65	0.8
MD of Wainwright No. 61	Municipal district	January 30, 1942	4,276	4,464	−4.2%	4,095.29	1.0
County of Warner No. 5	Municipal district	January 1, 1954	4,290	3,942	+8.8%	4,462.20	1.0
Westlock County	Municipal district	February 1, 1943	7,186	7,220	−0.5%	3,169.66	2.3
County of Wetaskiwin No. 10	Municipal district	February 1, 1943	11,212	11,176	+0.3%	3,121.98	3.6
Wheatland County	Municipal district	January 1, 1955	8,738	8,788	−0.6%	4,505.05	1.9
MD of Willow Creek No. 26	Municipal district	January 1, 1954	6,081	5,575	+9.1%	4,485.05	1.4
Woodlands County	Municipal district	January 1, 1994	4,558	4,744	−3.9%	7,599.52	0.6
Yellowhead County	Municipal district	January 1, 1994	10,426	10,995	−5.2%	22,238.56	0.5
Sub-total municipal districts			471,182	470,928	+0.1%	383,880.77	1.2
Sub-total improvement districts			2,024	2,055	−1.5%	59,375.72	0.0
Sub-total special areas			4,238	4,295	−1.3%	19,964.19	0.2
Total rural municipalities			481,682	482,136	−0.1%	468,249.48	1.0
Province of Alberta			4,262,635	4,067,175	+4.8%	634,658.27	6.7

== Metis settlements ==
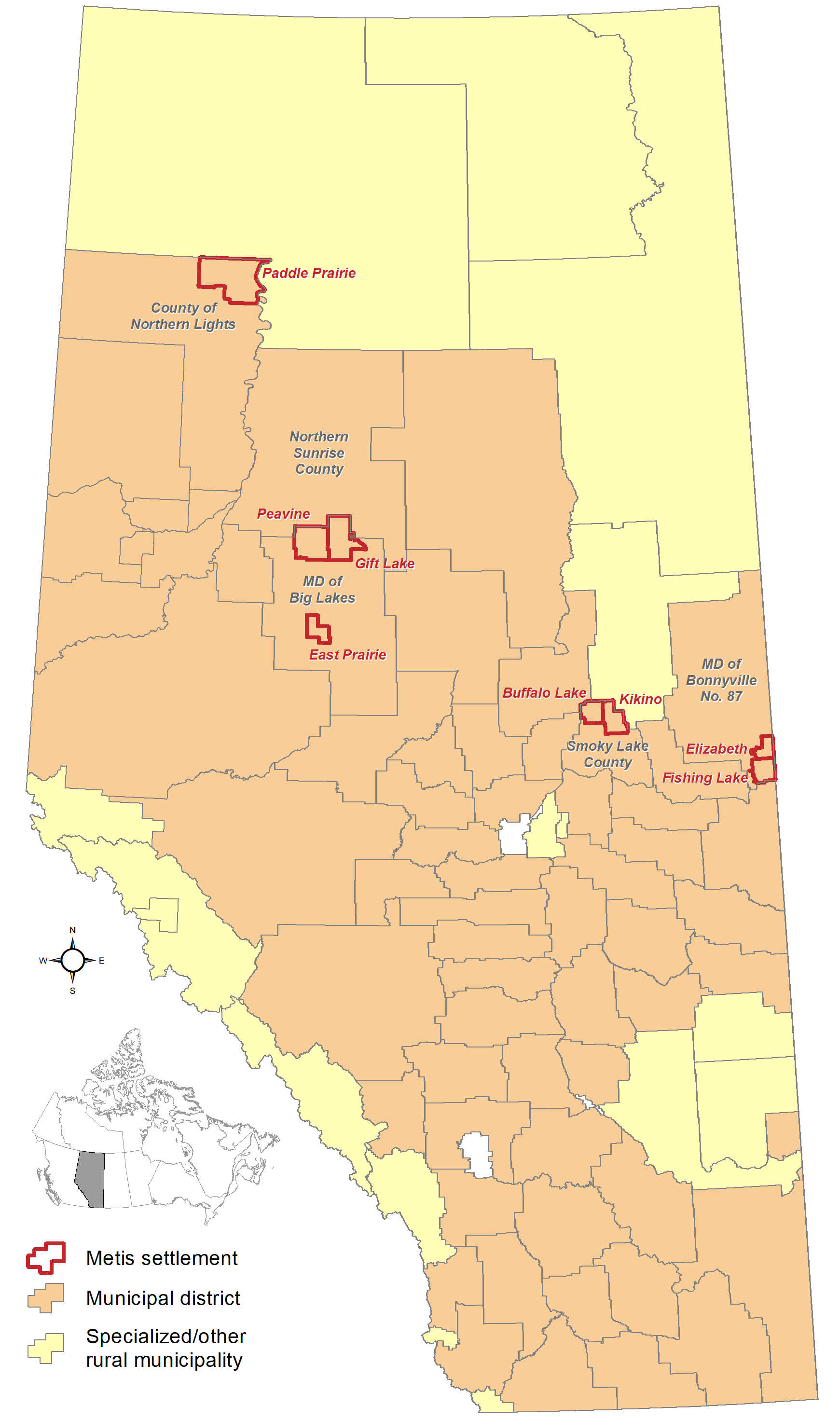
Distribution of Alberta's 8 Metis settlements among its 63 municipal districts (2020)

Metis settlements are unique local governments dedicated to Alberta's Metis people. (Note: The Metis are descendants of people of mixed First Nations and European heritage.) The settlements were originally created in 1938 under the authority of the Metis Population Betterment Act with land and governance being transferred to the settlements in 1989. Metis settlements are presently under the jurisdiction of the Metis Settlements Act, which was enacted in 2000.

Alberta has eight Metis settlements. Unlike the other types of municipalities, Metis settlements are not recognized as census subdivisions by Statistics Canada for federal census purposes. Rather, Statistics Canada recognizes them as designated places embedded within six municipal districts.

Alberta's eight Metis settlements had a cumulative population of 4,238 in the 2021 Census of Population. The province's largest and smallest Metis settlements by population are Kikino and East Prairie with 978 and 310 respectively, while the largest and smallest by land area are Paddle Prairie and Elizabeth at 1,726.45 km^{2} (666.59 sq mi) and 246.45 km^{2} (95.15 sq mi) respectively.

List of Métis settlements in Alberta
Name	Municipal district or specialized municipality	2021 Census of Population				
Name	Municipal district or specialized municipality	Population (2021)	Population (2016)	Change (%)	Land area (km^{2})	Population density (/km^{2})
Buffalo Lake	Smoky Lake County	379	712	−46.8%	335.68	1.1
East Prairie	Big Lakes County	310	304	+2.0%	328.42	0.9
Elizabeth	MD of Bonnyville No. 87	594	653	−9.0%	246.45	2.4
Fishing Lake	MD of Bonnyville No. 87	414	446	−7.2%	348.64	1.2
Gift Lake (Note: Gift Lake comprises two parts. The majority is located within Big Lakes County, while the balance is located within Northern Sunrise County. The Big Lakes County portion (part "A") had a population of 625 living on 802.46 km^{2} (309.83 mi^{2}) in 2021, while the Northern Sunrise County portion (part "B") had a population of 0 living on 0.83 km^{2} (0.32 mi^{2}).)	Big Lakes County; Northern Sunrise County	625	658	−5.0%	803.29	0.8
Kikino (Note: Kikino comprises two parts. The majority is located within Smoky Lake County, while the balance is located within Lac La Biche County. The Smoky Lake County portion (part "A") had a population of 978 living on 440.92 km^{2} (170.24 mi^{2}) in 2021, while the Lac La Biche County portion (part "B") had a population of 0 living on 0.77 km^{2} (0.30 mi^{2}).)	Smoky Lake County; Lac La Biche County	978	934	+4.7%	441.69	2.2
Paddle Prairie	County of Northern Lights	551	544	+1.3%	1,726.45	0.3
Peavine	Big Lakes County	387	607	−36.2%	798.95	0.5
Total Métis settlements		4,238	4,858	−12.8%	5,029.57	0.8

== See also ==
- List of former urban municipalities in Alberta
- List of hamlets in Alberta
- List of population centres in Alberta
