= List of francophone communities in Alberta =

This is a list of francophone communities in Alberta. Municipalities with a high percentage of French-speakers in the Canadian province of Alberta are listed.

Alberta’s Francophone population dates back to its early days as part of Rupert’s Land and the fur trade. This history has led to the establishment of several Francophone settlements, such as Morinville and Beaumont, as well as numerous geographic features—mountains, rivers, and towns—named after Métis or French words.

Today, Alberta is home to over 300,000 Francophones (those with French as a first language) and Francophiles (those who speak French as a second language), making up about 8% of the province’s total population.

While several communities have sizeable French-speaking minorities, the majority of Franco-Albertans resides within the province's two largest cities: Edmonton, and Calgary.

Municipality	Type	County, district, or regional municipality	Total population	Percentage of population whose mother tongue is French	Number of people whose mother tongue is French
Athabasca County	Rural municipality	Northern Alberta	6,959	2%	139
Banff	Town	Alberta's Rockies	8,305	8%	664
Beaumont	City	Edmonton Metropolitan Region	20,888	4%	836
Big Lakes	Rural Municipality	Northern Alberta	4,986	3%	150
Bighorn	Rural Municipality	Calgary Metropolitan Region	1,598	6%	96
Birch Hills	Rural Municipality	Northern Alberta	1,516	6%	91
Bon Accord	Town	Edmonton Metropolitan Region	1,461	3%	44
Bonnyville	Rural Municipality	Northern Alberta	12,897	5%	645
Bonnyville	Town	Northern Alberta	6,404	5%	320
Canmore	Town	Alberta's Rockies	15,990	5%	800
Cochrane	Town	Calgary Metropolitan Region	32,199	2%	644
Cold Lake	City	Northern Alberta	15,661	5%	783
Elk Point	Town	Northern Alberta	1,399	2%	28
Falher	Town	Northern Alberta	1,001	42%	420
Gibbons	Town	Edmonton Metropolitan Region	3,218	3%	97
Grande Prairie	City	Northern Alberta	64,141	2%	1,283
Grimshaw	Town	Northern Alberta	2,601	2%	52
High Prairie	Town	Northern Alberta	2,380	2%	48
Hinton	Town	Upper Athabasca	9,817	3%	295
Jasper	Specialized municipality	Alberta's Rockies	4,738	6%	284
Lac La Biche	Specialized municipality	Northern Alberta	7,673	6%	460
Legal	Town	Edmonton Metropolitan Region	1,232	11%	136
Morinville	Town	Edmonton Metropolitan Region	10,385	4%	415
Northern Sunrise	Rural Municipality	Northern Alberta	1,711	15%	257
Peace	Rural Municipality	Northern Alberta	1,581	3%	47
Peace River	Town	Northern Alberta	6,619	4%	265
Smoky River	Rural Municipality	Northern Alberta	1,684	36%	606
St. Albert	City	Edmonton Metropolitan Region	68,232	3%	2,047
St. Paul	Town	Northern Alberta	5,863	9%	528
St. Paul County	Rural Municipality	Northern Alberta	6,306	10%	631
Stony Plain	Town	Edmonton Metropolitan Region	17,993	2%	360
Sturgeon	Rural Municipality	Edmonton Metropolitan Region	20,061	3%	602
Valleyview	Town	Northern Alberta	1,673	2%	33
Wainwright	Rural Municipality	Central Alberta	4,276	3%	128
Wainwright	Town	Central Alberta	6,606	2%	132
Westlock County	Rural Municipality	Central Alberta	7,186	3%	216

A number of small municipalities also have high francophone populations. Small francophone-minority municipalities include: Alliance (6%), Bashaw (2%), Birchcliff (2%), Bondiss (8%), Bonnyville Beach (7%), Carbon (2%), Chipman (2%), Cremona (2%), Czar (2%), Donnelly (27%), Forestburg (3%), Girouxville (34%), Glendon (3%), Hay Lakes (2%), Holden (3%), Horseshoe Bay (13%), Hughenden (2%), Innisfree (3%), Island Lake (6%), Jarvis Bay (2%), Ma-Me-O Beach (3%), Mannville (2%), McLennan (12%), Mewatha Beach (5%), Morrin (2%), Munson (3%), Myrnam (2%), Nampa (4%), Parkland Beach (6%), Pelican Narrows (13%), Seba Beach (2%), Silver Sands (2%), South View (7%), Sunbreaker Cove (7%), Sundance Beach (11%), Sunrise Beach (7%), Waskatenau (2%), Whispering Hills (4%) and White Sands (3%).

== See also ==
- French Canadians
- Geographical distribution of French speakers
- List of municipalities in Alberta
