= Skeleton Lake =

Skeleton Lake may refer to:

- Skeleton Lake (Ontario), in the Muskoka region
- Skeleton Lake (Alberta), near Boyle
- Roopkund or Skeleton Lake, a high altitude glacial lake in Uttarakhand, India, the location of 300 to 600 skeletons at the edge of a lake
