= South View =

South View can refer to:

- South View LRT station, a light rail station on the Bukit Panjang LRT line in Choa Chu Kang, Singapore
- Southview, Calgary, a neighborhood in Calgary, Alberta, Canada
- Sylvania Southview High School, a high school in Sylvania, Ohio, United States
- South View, Alberta, a summer village in Alberta, Canada
