= Saddle Hills County =

Municipal district in Alberta, Canada

- Municipal district
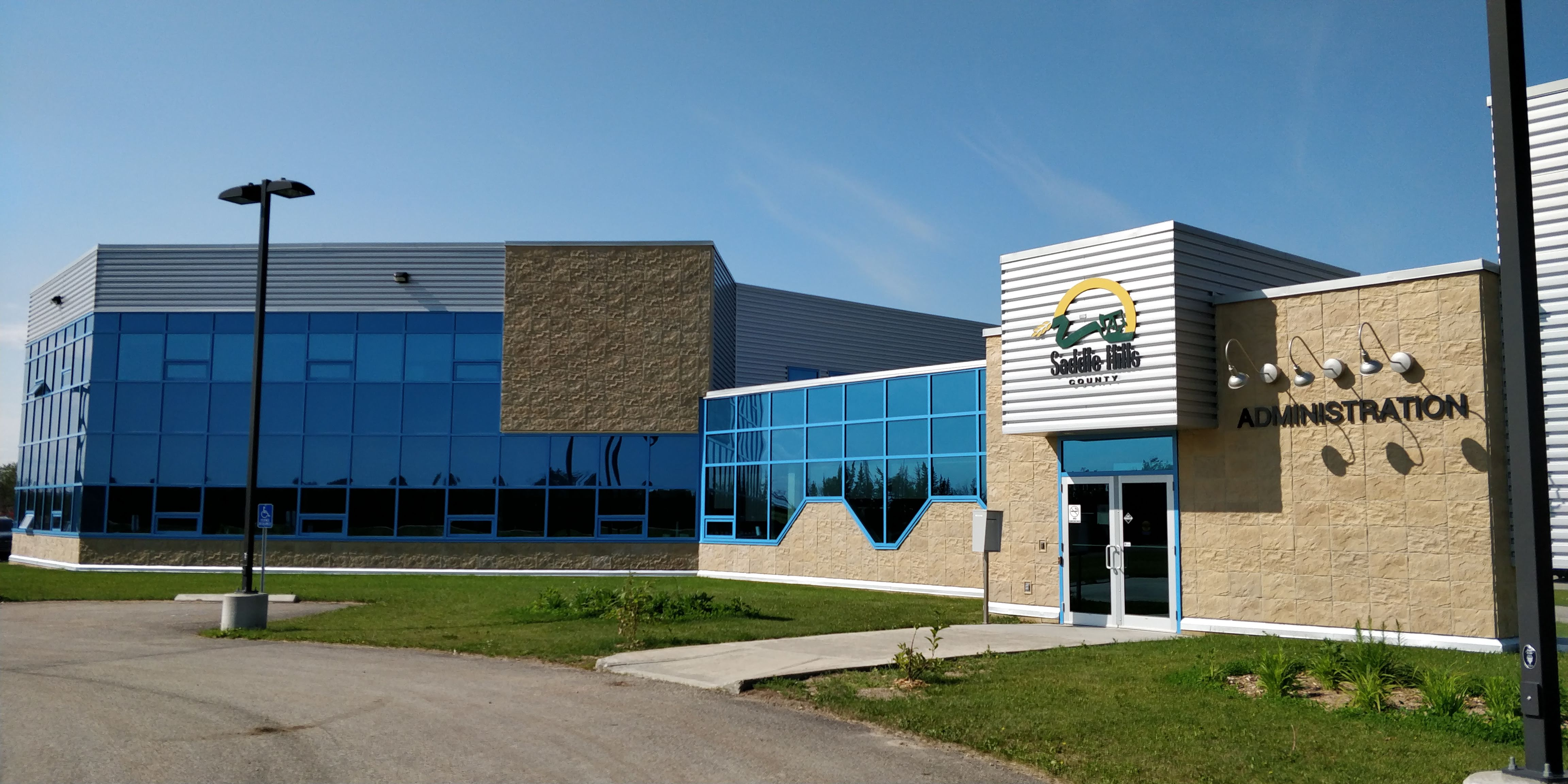
- Administration building

- Logo
- Motto: The Wilderness is our Back Yard

- Location within Alberta
- Coordinates: 55°46′55″N 118°50′2″W
- Country: Canada
- Province: Alberta
- Region: Northern Alberta
- Census division: 19
- Established: 1945
- Incorporated: 1995 (Municipal district)
- 1999 (County)

Government
  - Reeve: Alvin Hubert
  - Governing body: Saddle Hills County Council
  - Administrative office: west of Spirit River

Area (2021)
  - Land: 5,827.7 km^{2} (2,250.1 sq mi)

Population (2021)
  - Total: 2,338
  - Density: 0.4/km^{2} (1.0/sq mi)
- Time zone: UTC−06:00 (Alberta Time)
- Website: saddlehills.ab.ca

Saddle Hills County is a municipal district situated in the central portion of the Peace Country in northwest Alberta, Canada. Located approximately 450 km (280 mi) northwest of Edmonton and 90 km (56 mi) north of Grande Prairie, its municipal office is located approximately 25 km (16 mi) west of the Town of Spirit River at the intersection of Highway 49 and Highway 725.

== Geography ==
=== Communities and localities ===
The following urban municipalities are surrounded by Saddle Hills County.

Cities

- none

Towns

- none

Villages

- none

Summer villages

- none

The following hamlets are located within Saddle Hills County.

Hamlets

- Woking

The following localities are located within Saddle Hills County.

Localities

- Bay Tree
- Blueberry Mountain
- Bonanza
- Braeburn
- Cotillion
- Dunvegan Settlement
- Fourth Creek
- Gordondale
- Happy Valley
- Ksituan
- Moonshine Lake
- Northmark
- Poplar Ridge
- Savanna
- Silver Valley
- Whitburn

== Demographics ==
In the 2021 Census of Population conducted by Statistics Canada, Saddle Hills County had a population of 2,338 living in 880 of its 1,115 total private dwellings, a change of 5.1% from its 2016 population of 2,225. With a land area of 5,827.7 km^{2} (2,250.1 sq mi), it had a population density of 0.4/km^{2} (1.0/sq mi) in 2021.

In the 2016 Census of Population conducted by Statistics Canada, Saddle Hills County had a population of 2,225 living in 838 of its 978 total private dwellings, a −2.8% change from its 2011 population of 2,288. With a land area of 5,838.15 km^{2} (2,254.12 sq mi), it had a population density of 0.4/km^{2} (1.0/sq mi) in 2016.

== Economy ==
Saddle Hills County is situated in the Central Peace Region of northwestern Alberta along the southern banks of the Peace River. The county has a diverse agricultural community and deposits of natural gas and oil.

The oil and gas industry continues to play an important role in the region and helps to create a progressive and growing economic base.

Saddle Hills County is also home to a diverse agricultural community which produces crops which include: pulses, cereals, canola, legumes as well as bison, elk, goats and sheep. The most common livestock is cattle with an estimated 26,429 head.

Rail service is available nearby in the Village of Rycroft, the Hamlet of Woking and the City of Dawson Creek.

Two major road corridors (Highway 49 and Highway 2) run through the County offering access to the Northwest Territories, British Columbia as well as Central and Southern Alberta.

Three areas of the County have been targeted for economic growth and have area structure plans that are designed to give landowners, developers and prospective residents a sense of where the County its future potential.

In November 2019, Saddle Hills County Council declared a municipal agricultural disaster following a wet fall and early snow that resulted in many crops remaining unharvested. As late October 2019, only 59% of crops had been harvested in the Peace Region.

== Government ==
County Council is responsible for establishing municipal service levels, approving the annual budget and local taxation levels. Council has seven members and is headed by a reeve. The reeve, currently Alvin Hubert, is the chief elected officer and is elected from within council. It is the reeve's responsibility to chair all council meetings and speak on behalf of council and the community.

Council provides direction to its administration through its chief administrative officer (CAO). The CAO is responsible for the overall administration of the county and for advising and making recommendations to county council on matters concerning the municipality.

== Gallery ==
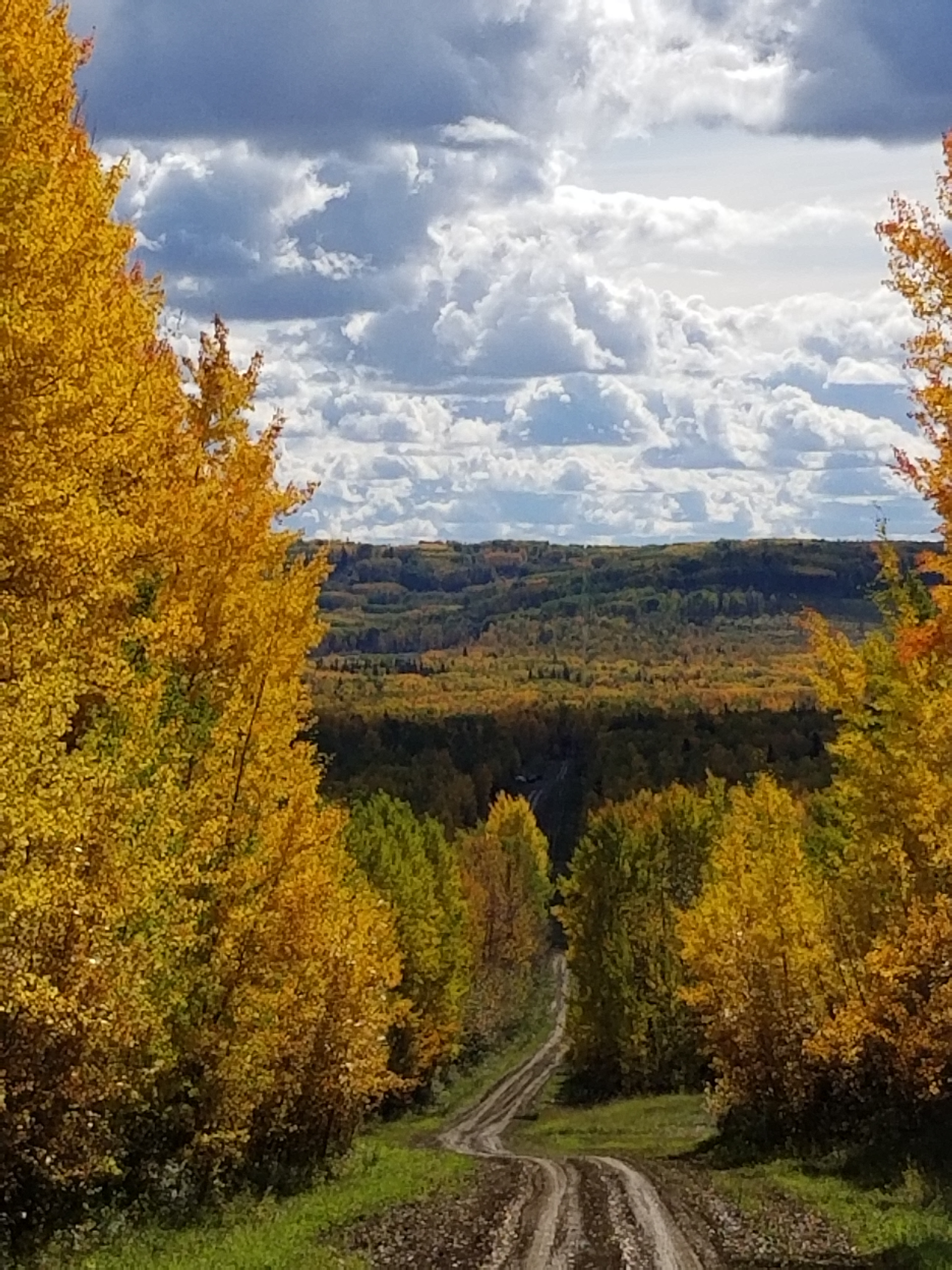
The beautiful Saddle Hills in autumn

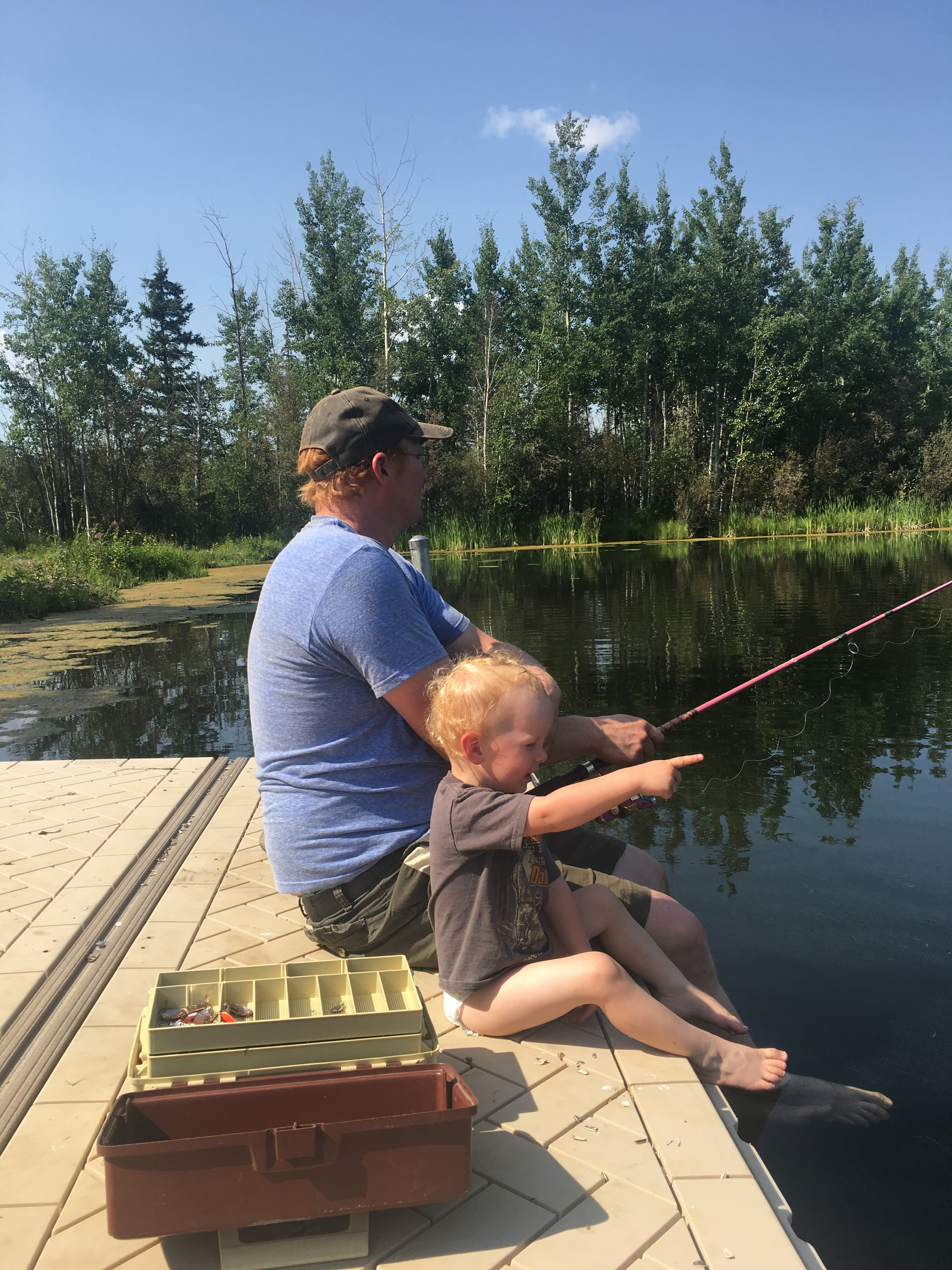
Moonshine Lake offers year-round fishing

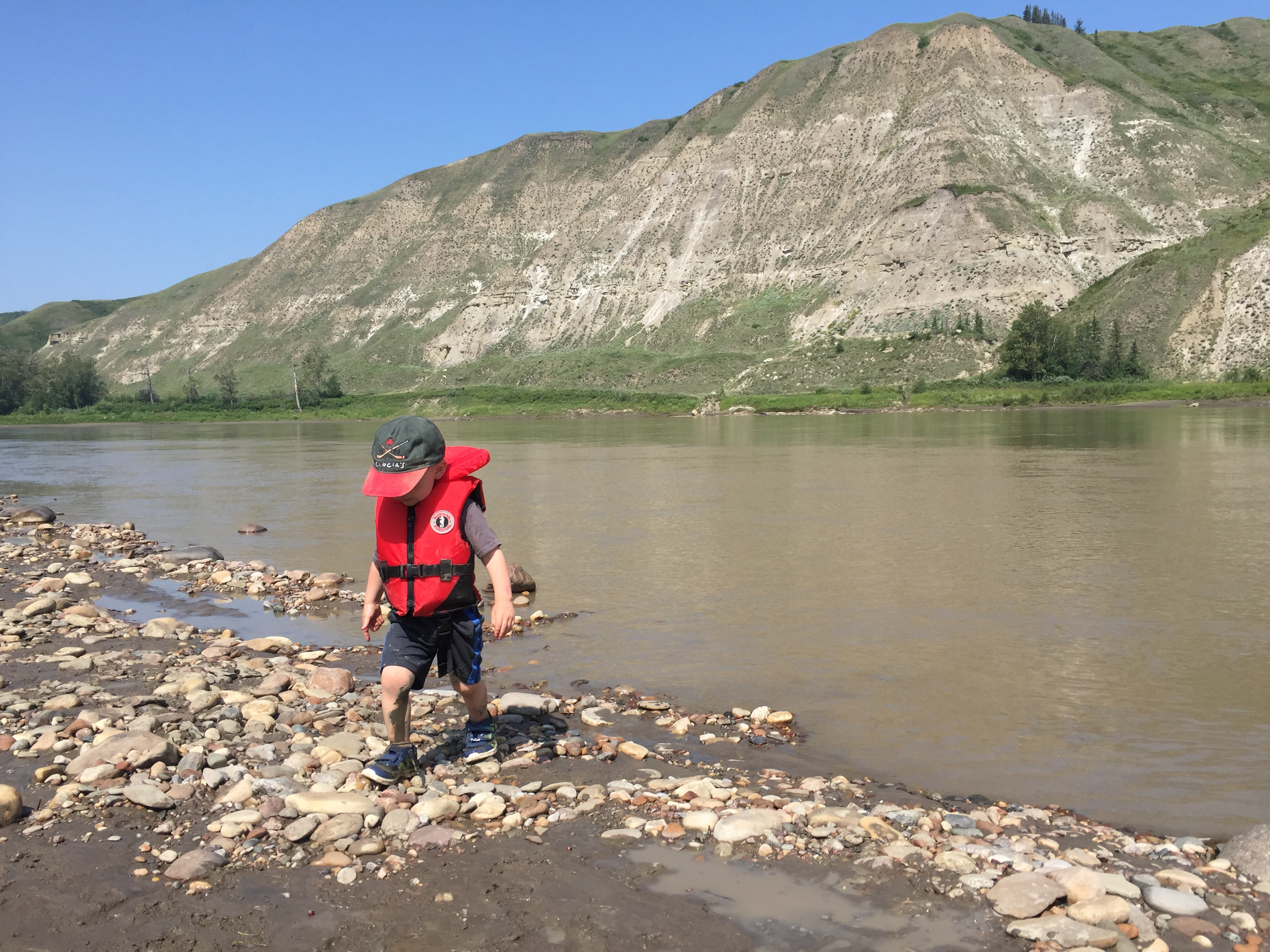
Canada's Mighty Peace River runs through Saddle Hills County

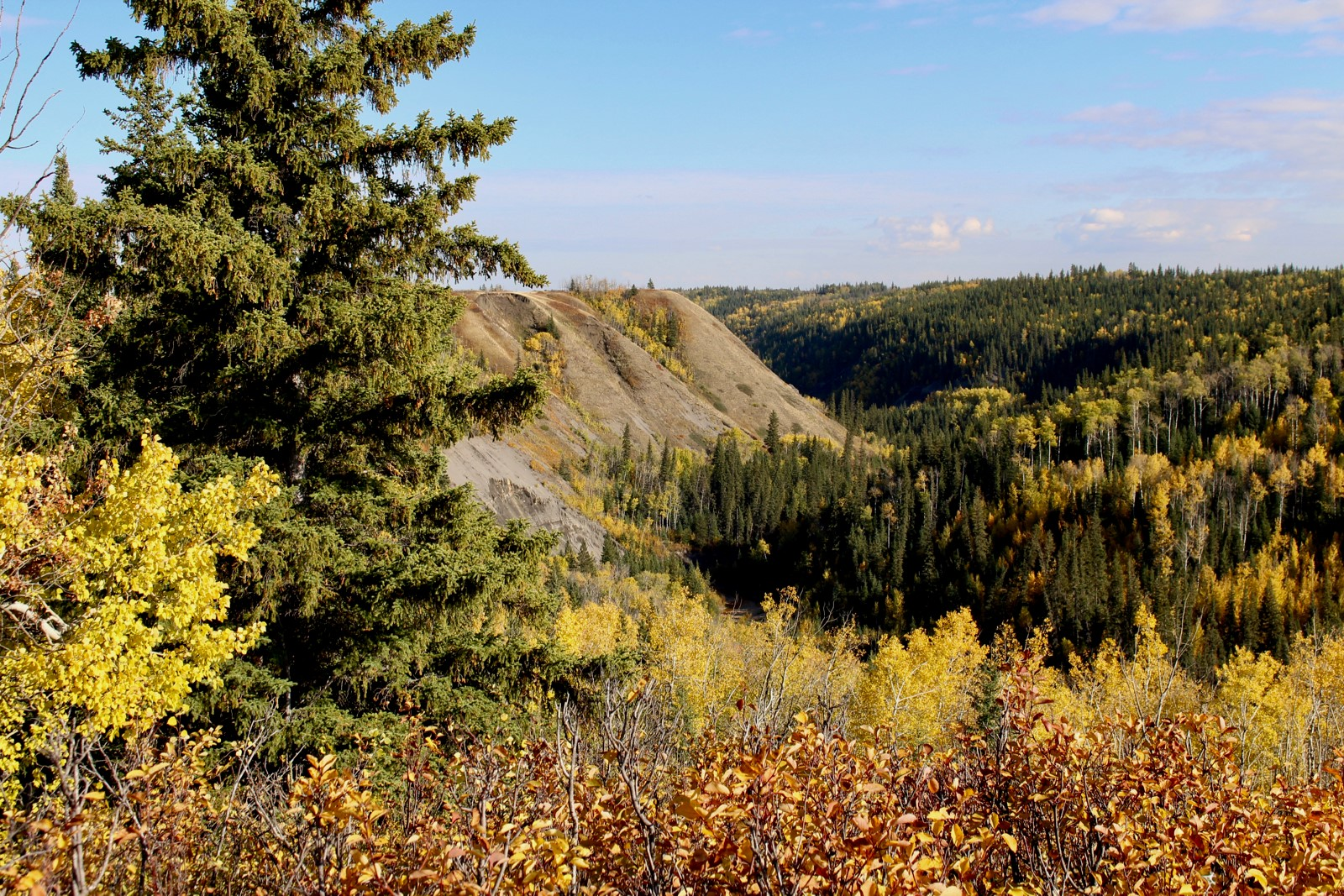
Autumn makes the hills and valley of Saddle Hills County stand out

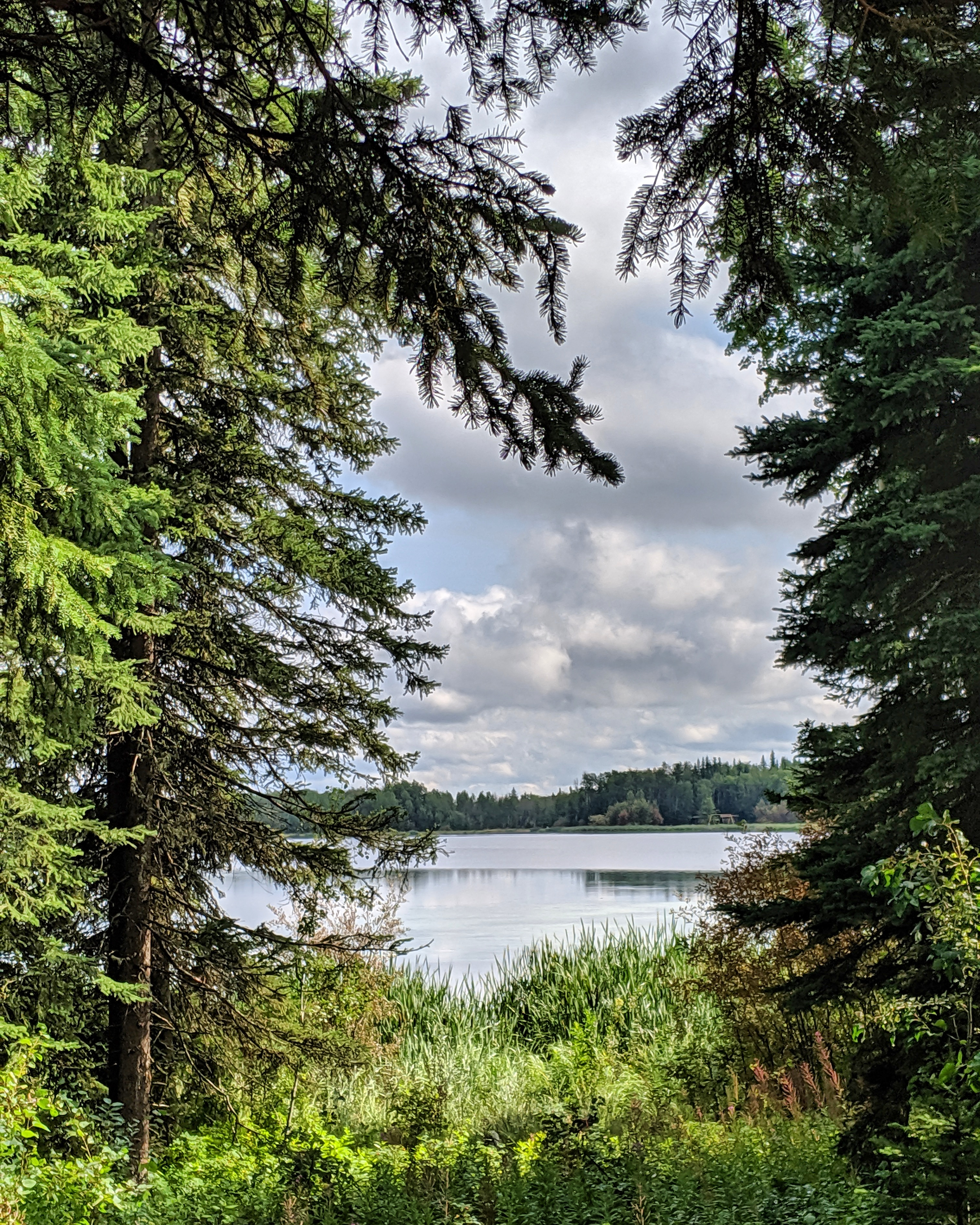
Moonshine Lake is one of the jewels of Saddle Hills County

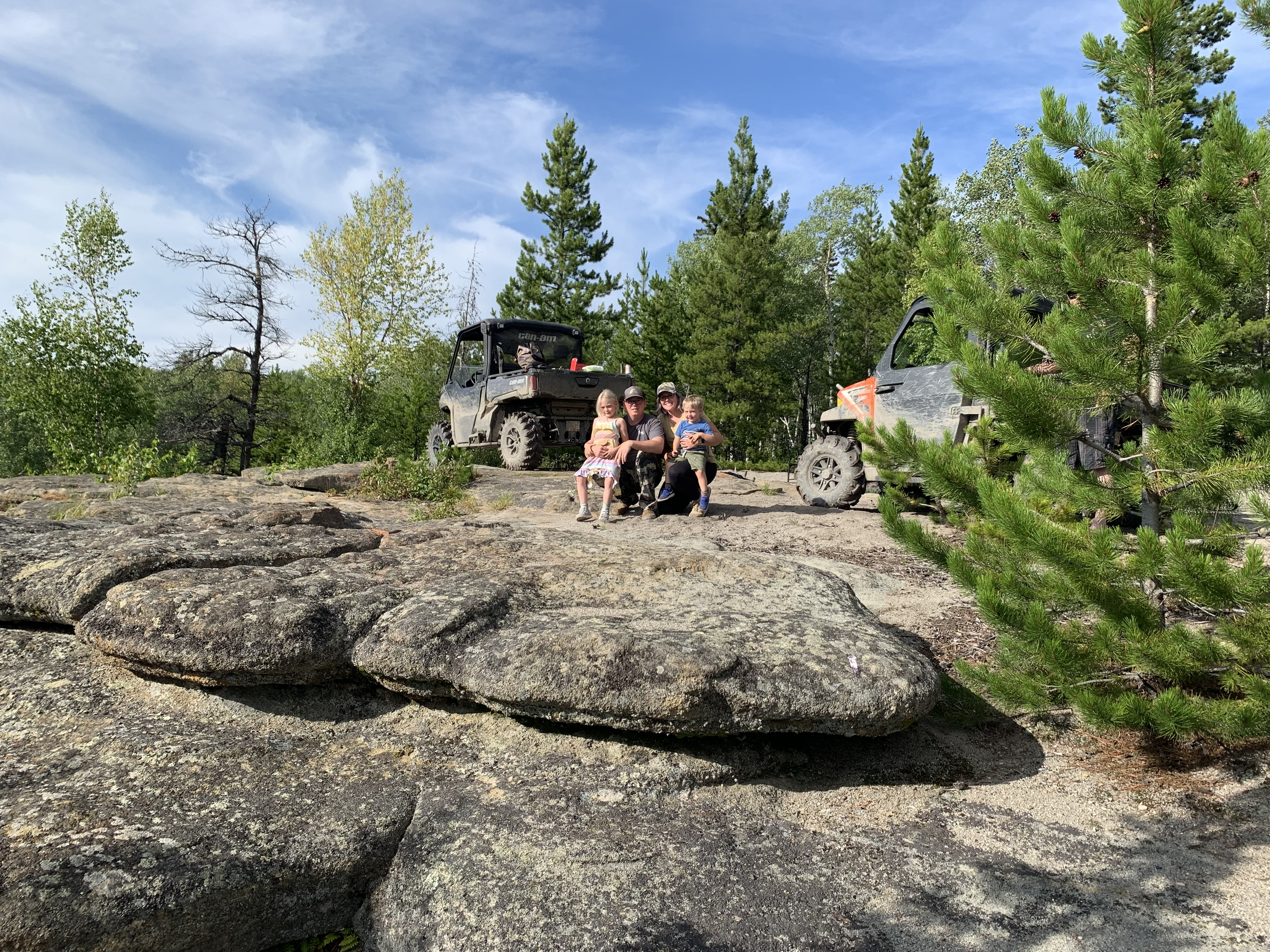
The Rim Rocks are a unique rock formation near Bay Tree is Saddle Hills County

== See also ==
- List of communities in Alberta
- List of municipal districts in Alberta
