= Kikino Metis Settlement =

- Metis Settlement
- Location within Smoky Lake County

- Location within Alberta
- Coordinates: 54°24′N 112°30′W
- Country: Canada
- Province: Alberta
- Region: Central Alberta
- Census division: 12

Government
  - Chair: Chad Cardinal
  - Governing body: Kikino Metis Council

Area (2021)
  - Land: 799.78 km^{2} (308.80 sq mi)

Population (2021)
  - Total: 978
  - Density: 0.5/km^{2} (1.3/sq mi)
- Time zone: UTC−06:00 (Alberta Time)
- Website: Official website

Kikino Metis Settlement is a Metis settlement in central Alberta, Canada within Smoky Lake County. It is located along Highway 36, approximately 128 km (80 mi) west of Cold Lake. Kikino is one of eight Metis settlements. The eight Metis settlements comprise 512,121 hectares of land in total, and Kikino comprises about 44,000 hectares Resources such as gas and oil, fishing, trapping, and hunting can be found from the land of the settlement. Kikino, along with the other Metis Settlements of Alberta function as their own individual town or city and have their own schools, post office and other buildings.

== Demographics ==
In the 2021 Census of Population conducted by Statistics Canada, Kikino (parts A and B combined) had a population of 978 living in 309 of its 322 total private dwellings, a change of 4.7% from its 2016 population of 934. With a land area of 441.69 km^{2} (170.54 sq mi), it had a population density of 2.2/km^{2} (5.7/sq mi) in 2021.

The population of the Kikino Metis Settlement according to its 2018 municipal census is 928, an increase from its 2015 municipal census population count of 918.

As a designated place in the 2016 Census of Population conducted by Statistics Canada, by combining parts "A" and "B", the Kikino Metis Settlement had a population of 934 living in 283 of its 319 total private dwellings, a change of −3.1% from its 2011 population of 964. With a land area of 443.57 km^{2} (171.26 sq mi), it had a population density of 2.1/km^{2} (5.5/sq mi) in 2016.

== History ==
In their early years, Kikino was a part of a greater settlement which was just the Metis First Peoples and they were not their own settlement. Their early life takes place in the Great Lakes region, but as European settlements expanded, they moved upwards to where they are now. Prior to the 8 communities established, it was only a separation of two Metis groups. It was the French Metis and Anglo Metis. Eventually those distinctions developed into twelve different communities then fell down to 8.

The first major act that affected Kikino, which at the time was known as Goodfish Lake, was the Dominion Lands Act of 1872. This act made land available at a very low price to settlers moving West. However, this excluded the Metis up until the late 1870s.

The Metis Settlement was created from the Métis Population Betterment Act of 1938. This act was passed by the Alberta government, due to the poorly structured living conditions that the Metis people were living in. The Metis people were already living on this land, they just did not have their own governance of this land. The act made it so the Metis Settlement was able to form their one government and this was said to eventually lead to an improvement of living conditions for the Metis First Peoples. The struggles that the Kikino people faced was that they were struggling to live up to the standards of the West's living standards. This act also allowed for the preservations of culture and a way to allow traditions to live on. The Betterment Act did not give complete control over the Metis land, but it gave them a little bit more than what they previously had.

The Metis Population Betterment Act established 12 colonies within the Metis Settlement. Kikino was previously known as Goodfish Lake, but later adopted Kikino which means "our home". The settlement was said to have chosen Kikino as a means to demonstrated what the Betterment Act meant to the community as a whole, since the First Peoples struggled with self identity. The land that was granted to them was theirs and they did not have very much built in the area, therefore they were able to have a clean slate.

The Act was later revisited because the Metis Settlement did not solve all of the problems that the Metis settlements were concerned about, it only allowed them to exist as their own settlement. Eventually in 1952 after the Betterment Act was revisited, they were allowed to elect board members and they gained control of their businesses. By 1960, out of the 12 original communities, only 8 of them continued to be a part of the Metis Settlement. Kikino remained one of the 8.

== Events ==
=== Silver Birch Rodeo & Celebration Days ===
Silver Birch Rodeo is a yearly event during the community's Celebration Days, usually hosted in August. There are usually anywhere from 2–3 days to celebrate this event and they host activities such as bull riding, cow riding, wild horse racing and other rodeo events. In several news outlets, it is said that the event is becoming extremely popular that it will eventually have to move to a bigger area to host the event. Other events that Kikino are involved in or host are the Slo-Pitch Tourney and the Metis Triathlon.

== Culture ==
Kikino culture is a mixture of First Nation's traditions but also European culture from the time that they were going through assimilation. The reason this settlement, along with the rest of the Metis settlements, fought for their own land and right of governance was because of the struggles they were facing when adapting to Western life. There is no real timeline of when the Metis settlements shifted from French Metis to Anglo Metis. Even in the Metis right declaration, they acknowledge that they are forever tied with Canadian history and lineage.

As of August 2024, Kikino is the home to Alberta's Largest Red River Cart. The cart was constructed from welded metal and wood beams and stands at over 30 feet tall, 24 feet wide and 58 feet in length. The cart is open to the public and is located on Township road 632 west at the entrance to the townsite of Kikino.

=== Language ===
In the Kikino settlement, English is predominantly spoken. Other languages spoken also include "mother tongue" languages which are the Aboriginal, Cree-Montagnais, Cree, Northern Athabaskan languages, and Dene. Michif is also a spoken language among the Kikino settlement.

=== Architecture ===
When Kikino is known for its buildings and architecture and it plays a major role in the community's identity. Items such as the Metis flag and birchbark canoes remain a representation in Kikino traditions. When the Kikino families were first given rights to their own land, they built homes by using basic needs and using materials available. This meant that most of the material that was readily available were logs or thick pieces of wood. This was how the ancestors of the Metis Settlement built their homes, so the Kikino and other settlements building their homes this way kept they kept their tradition alive. Much of their resources were repurposed and this left them with a better relationship with their traditions. Kikino's elemenatary school is one of the most popular examples that is used to demonstrate Metis traditions and architecture. Kikino's architecture also keeps developing, the community tends to come together to teach each other new techniques on what to build.

== Government ==
The Kikino government follows the Metis Settlement Constitution that was approved by the Prime Minister. Kikino's constitution was amended several times before it was approved. Each settlement elects leaders in order to maintain their councils. Kikino elects five member every three years. With the Metis Betterment Act, it was instructed to the settlements that their council had specific powers and responsibilities, these included but were not limited to ensuring the improvement of the settlements. This meant that they would constantly find ways to improve their living conditions that is agreed upon by the people. the council was expected to look at what their community needs and improve it.

=== Current Councilman ===
Chad Cardinal is the current Chairman of the Kikino Metis Settlement. One of the current issues that Chad Cardinal is focusing on is inflation. The 2022 all-time high is heavily effecting the Kikino settlement. Chad Cardinal is currently using different programs that are already assist members of the community with covering these rising costs. Although, Cardinal feels that Kikino can implement more programs to help these First Nations people, he still believe Alberta needs to do more to assist them during these difficult times.

== See also ==
- List of communities in Alberta
- List of designated places in Alberta
