= Bonanza, Alberta =

Bonanza
- Unincorporated community
- Location of Bonanza in Alberta
- Coordinates: 55.9128°N 119.8275°W
- Country: Canada
- Province: Alberta
- Census division: No. 19
- Municipal district: Saddle Hills County

Government
  - Type: Unincorporated
  - Governing body: Saddle Hills County Council
- Time zone: UTC-7 (MST)

Bonanza is an unincorporated community in Alberta, Canada.

It is located in census division No. 19 and is administered by Saddle Hills County.

== See also ==
- List of communities in Alberta
