= Gordondale, Alberta =

Unincorporated community

Coordinates: 55°50′24″N 119°32′25″W

Location of Gordondale Alberta

Gordondale is an unincorporated community in northern Alberta in Saddle Hills County, located on Highway 49, 88 kilometres (55 mi) northwest of Grande Prairie.

Gordondale was originally settled as Moose Creek. Moose Creek Post Office was opened in 1929. Moose Creek Store opened in 1930. Moose Creek was renamed Gordondale in 1933 after early settlers Henry and Louise Kirkness’ son Gordon.

The area economy is farming and petroleum extraction based.

References: https://southpeacearchives.org/holdings-2/finding-aids/fonds-660-kirkness-steinhauer-testawich-family-fonds/ https://www.saddlehills.ab.ca/en/explore-and-play/gordondale.aspx
