= Moonshine Lake (Alberta) =

Lake in Saddle Hills County, Alberta, Canada

- Location within Alberta
- Location: Saddle Hills County, Alberta
- Coordinates: 55°53′11″N 119°13′40″W
- Basin countries: Canada
- Max. length: 0.8 km (0.50 mi)
- Max. width: 0.7 km (0.43 mi)
- Surface area: 28 ha (69 acres)
- Average depth: 1.3 m (4 ft 3 in)
- Max. depth: 3.5 m (11 ft)
- Surface elevation: 717 m (2,352 ft)
- References: Moonshine Lake

Moonshine Lake is a lake in Alberta. As early as 1910, this small lake 55°53′11″N 119°13′40″W was located on what was known as the Moonshine Trail. The lake was originally called Mirage Lake. Local folklore tells of two men, Jack Campbell and Harry Hanrahan, who while climbing the steep bank of the north shore of the lake in the 1920s, spilled their home-brewed moonshine. It has been known as Moonshine Lake ever since. There is also folklore that a rich crazy woman buried gold coins at the bottom of the lake.

Moonshine Lake Provincial Park 55°52′47″N 119°12′56″W was established in 1979 and covers an area of 847 hectares. The campground is located on the north and northeast side of the lake, while the day-use area and group camping is located on the south side of the lake.
