= Island Lake, Alberta =

Island Lake
- Summer village
- Summer Village of Island Lake
- Location of Island Lake in Alberta
- Coordinates: 54.84937°N 113.55426°W
- Country: Canada
- Province: Alberta
- Census division: No. 13

Government
  - Type: Municipal incorporation
  - Mayor: Chad Newton
  - Governing body: Island Lake Summer Village Council

Area (2021)
  - Land: 1.55 km^{2} (0.60 sq mi)

Population (2021)
  - Total: 174
  - Density: 112.4/km^{2} (291/sq mi)
- Time zone: UTC−06:00 (Alberta Time)
- Website: islandlake.ca

Island Lake is a summer village in Alberta, Canada. It is located on the western shore of Island Lake, along Highway 2, northwest of Athabasca.

== Demographics ==
In the 2021 Census of Population conducted by Statistics Canada, the Summer Village of Island Lake South had a population of 81 living in 42 of its 85 total private dwellings, a change of 32.8% from its 2016 population of 61. With a land area of 0.48 km^{2} (0.19 sq mi), it had a population density of 168.8/km^{2} (437.1/sq mi) in 2021.

In the 2016 Census of Population conducted by Statistics Canada, the Summer Village of Island Lake had a population of 228 living in 96 of its 263 total private dwellings, a −6.2% change from its 2011 population of 243. With a land area of 1.85 km^{2} (0.71 sq mi), it had a population density of 123.2/km^{2} (319.2/sq mi) in 2016.

== See also ==
- List of communities in Alberta
- List of francophone communities in Alberta
- List of summer villages in Alberta
- List of resort villages in Saskatchewan
