= Bonnyville Beach =

- Summer village
- Summer Village of Bonnyville Beach
- Location in M.D. of Bonnyville No. 87

- Location of Bonnyville Beach in Alberta
- Coordinates: 54°14′00″N 110°52′00″W
- Country: Canada
- Province: Alberta
- Planning region: Lower Athabasca
- Municipal district: Bonnyville No. 87

Government
  - Type: Municipal incorporation
  - Mayor: Grant Ferbey
  - Governing body: Bonnyville Beach Summer Village Council

Area (2021)
  - Land: 0.23 km^{2} (0.089 sq mi)

Population (2021)
  - Total: 70
  - Density: 298.1/km^{2} (772/sq mi)
- Time zone: UTC−06:00 (Alberta Time)
- Website: bonnyvillebeach.com

Bonnyville Beach is a summer village in Alberta, Canada. It is located in the Municipal District of Bonnyville No. 87.

== Demographics ==
In the 2021 Census of Population conducted by Statistics Canada, the Summer Village of Bonnyville Beach had a population of 70 living in 32 of its 66 total private dwellings, a change of −16.7% from its 2016 population of 84. With a land area of 0.23 km^{2} (0.089 sq mi), it had a population density of 304.3/km^{2} (788.3/sq mi) in 2021.

In the 2016 Census of Population conducted by Statistics Canada, the Summer Village of Bonnyville Beach had a population of 84 living in 33 of its 70 total private dwellings, a change of −11.6% from its 2011 population of 95. With a land area of 0.17 km^{2} (0.066 sq mi), it had a population density of 494.1/km^{2} (1,279.8/sq mi) in 2016.

== See also ==
- List of communities in Alberta
- List of francophone communities in Alberta
- List of summer villages in Alberta
- List of resort villages in Saskatchewan
