= Mewatha Beach =

- Summer village
- Summer Village of Mewatha Beach
- Location of Mewatha Beach in Alberta
- Coordinates: 54.60201°N 112.72775°W
- Country: Canada
- Province: Alberta
- Census division: No. 13

Government
  - Type: Municipal incorporation
  - Mayor: Barry Walker
  - Governing body: Mewatha Beach Summer Village Council

Area (2021)
  - Land: 0.79 km^{2} (0.31 sq mi)

Population (2021)
  - Total: 103
  - Density: 129.8/km^{2} (336/sq mi)
- Time zone: UTC−06:00 (Alberta Time)
- Website: Official website

Mewatha Beach is a summer village in Alberta, Canada. It is located on the western shore of Skeleton Lake, east of Boyle.

== Demographics ==
In the 2021 Census of Population conducted by Statistics Canada, the Summer Village of Mewatha Beach had a population of 103 living in 57 of its 177 total private dwellings, a change of 14.4% from its 2016 population of 90. With a land area of 0.79 km^{2} (0.31 sq mi), it had a population density of 130.4/km^{2} (337.7/sq mi) in 2021.

In the 2016 Census of Population conducted by Statistics Canada, the Summer Village of Mewatha Beach had a population of 90 living in 48 of its 177 total private dwellings, a 13.9% change from its 2011 population of 79. With a land area of 0.8 km^{2} (0.31 sq mi), it had a population density of 112.5/km^{2} (291.4/sq mi) in 2016.

== See also ==
- List of communities in Alberta
- List of francophone communities in Alberta
- List of summer villages in Alberta
- List of resort villages in Saskatchewan
