= Pelican Narrows, Alberta =

Pelican Narrows Pelly
- Summer village
- Summer Village of Pelican Narrows
- Location of Pelican Narrows in Alberta
- Coordinates: 54.25002°N 110.88329°W
- Country: Canada
- Province: Alberta
- Census division: No. 12

Government
  - Type: Municipal incorporation
  - Mayor: Robert Hornseth
  - Governing body: Pelican Narrows Summer Village Council

Area (2021)
  - Land: 0.74 km^{2} (0.29 sq mi)

Population (2021)
  - Total: 158
  - Density: 215/km^{2} (560/sq mi)
- Time zone: UTC−06:00 (Alberta Time)

Pelican Narrows ("Pelly") is a summer village in Alberta, Canada. Located on the western shore of Moose Lake, south of Moose Lake Provincial Park, it is connected to Bonnyville by Highway 28.

== Demographics ==
In the 2021 Census of Population conducted by Statistics Canada, the Summer Village of Pelican Narrows had a population of 158 living in 60 of its 95 total private dwellings, a change of 4.6% from its 2016 population of 151. With a land area of 0.74 km^{2} (0.29 sq mi), it had a population density of 213.5/km^{2} (553.0/sq mi) in 2021.

In the 2016 Census of Population conducted by Statistics Canada, the Summer Village of Pelican Narrows had a population of 151 living in 54 of its 65 total private dwellings, a −6.8% change from its 2011 population of 162. With a land area of 0.72 km^{2} (0.28 sq mi), it had a population density of 209.7/km^{2} (543.2/sq mi) in 2016.

== See also ==
- List of communities in Alberta
- List of francophone communities in Alberta
- List of summer villages in Alberta
- List of resort villages in Saskatchewan
