= Skeleton Lake (Alberta) =

Recreational lake in Alberta, Canada

- Location within Alberta
- Location: Athabasca County, Alberta
- Coordinates: 54°37′19″N 112°43′29″W
- Basin countries: Canada
- Max. length: 5.7 km (3.5 mi)
- Max. width: 5.4 km (3.4 mi)
- Surface area: 7.89 km^{2} (3.05 sq mi)
- Average depth: 6.5 m (21 ft)
- Max. depth: 17 m (56 ft)
- Surface elevation: 623 m (2,044 ft)
- References: Skeleton Lake

Skeleton Lake (Cree: Cheply Sakhahigan) is a recreational, freshwater lake in Alberta, Canada. The lake is 6.5 kilometres (4.0 mi) Northeast of the town of Boyle, Alberta, along Highway 63. It is in Athabasca County, 170 kilometres (110 mi) northeast of the City of Edmonton.

The lake's name is a translation of the Cree Cheply Sakhahigan which means "place of the skeletons." A Cree chief is buried along the eastern shore of the lake. The lake drains through a small creek in Bondiss eastwards towards Amisk Lake.

There are approximately 890 cottage and trailer sites around Skeleton Lake. There are 11 subdivisions surrounding the lake, which are part of the Athabasca County, containing approximately 300 lots. As well, the Summer Village of Mewatha Beach with approximately 220 properties, the Summer Village of Bondiss with approximately 195 lots and Shoreline Campground with approximately 170 sites are all on the shores of Skeleton Lake. A public golf course is in the Summer Village of Bondiss on the east side of the lake.

== History ==
The area around Skeleton Lake was home to large amounts of logging during the early twentieth century. Spruce was harvested from the surrounding forests, while birch and other hardwoods were often used for furniture or wagons, and sometimes burned into charcoal. The lake also became a popular fishing spot, stocking whitefish, northern pike and other species, with commercial fishing starting in the 1930s. Whitefish were introduced into the lake in the mid-1940s via spawn caught by local fishermen.
