= Bondiss =

- Summer village
- Summer Village of Bondiss
- Location of Bondiss in Alberta
- Coordinates: 54°36′04″N 112°41′24″W
- Country: Canada
- Province: Alberta
- Census division: No. 13

Government
  - Type: Municipal incorporation
  - Mayor: (acting)
  - Governing body: Bondiss Summer Village Council

Area (2021)
  - Land: 1.18 km^{2} (0.46 sq mi)

Population (2021)
  - Total: 124
  - Density: 105.5/km^{2} (273/sq mi)
- Time zone: UTC−06:00 (Alberta Time)
- Website: www.bondiss.com

Bondiss is a summer village in Alberta, Canada. It is located at the eastern tip of Skeleton Lake, between Boyle and Lac La Biche.

== Demographics ==
In the 2021 Census of Population conducted by Statistics Canada, the Summer Village of Bondiss had a population of 124 living in 70 of its 177 total private dwellings, a change of 12.7% from its 2016 population of 110. With a land area of 1.18 km^{2} (0.46 sq mi), it had a population density of 105.1/km^{2} (272.2/sq mi) in 2021.

In the 2016 Census of Population conducted by Statistics Canada, the Summer Village of Bondiss had a population of 110 living in 56 of its 195 total private dwellings, a 3.8% change from its 2011 population of 106. With a land area of 1.23 km^{2} (0.47 sq mi), it had a population density of 89.4/km^{2} (231.6/sq mi) in 2016.

== See also ==
- List of communities in Alberta
- List of francophone communities in Alberta
- List of summer villages in Alberta
- List of resort villages in Saskatchewan
