= South View, Alberta =

South View
- Summer village
- Summer Village of South View
- Location of South View in Alberta
- Coordinates: 53.65152°N 114.66444°W
- Country: Canada
- Province: Alberta
- Census division: No. 13

Government
  - Type: Municipal incorporation
  - Mayor: Sandra Benford
  - Governing body: South View Summer Village Council

Area (2021)
  - Land: 0.44 km^{2} (0.17 sq mi)

Population (2021)
  - Total: 72
  - Density: 162.4/km^{2} (421/sq mi)
- Time zone: UTC−06:00 (Alberta Time)
- Website: Official website

South View is a summer village in Alberta, Canada. It is located on the northern shore of Isle Lake, opposite from Silver Sands.

== Demographics ==
In the 2021 Census of Population conducted by Statistics Canada, the Summer Village of South View had a population of 72 living in 35 of its 86 total private dwellings, a change of 7.5% from its 2016 population of 67. With a land area of 0.44 km^{2} (0.17 sq mi), it had a population density of 163.6/km^{2} (423.8/sq mi) in 2021.

In the 2016 Census of Population conducted by Statistics Canada, the Summer Village of South View had a population of 67 living in 30 of its 88 total private dwellings, a 91.4% change from its 2011 population of 35. With a land area of 0.41 km^{2} (0.16 sq mi), it had a population density of 163.4/km^{2} (423.2/sq mi) in 2016.

The Summer Village of South View's 2012 municipal census counted a population of 76.

== See also ==
- List of communities in Alberta
- List of francophone communities in Alberta
- List of summer villages in Alberta
- List of resort villages in Saskatchewan
