= Alberta Highway 44 =

Highway in Alberta, Canada

Highway 44
- Highway 44 highlighted in red

Route information
- Maintained by the Ministry of Transportation and Economic Corridors
- Length: 171.63 km (106.65 mi)

Major junctions
- South end: Highway 16 (TCH) near Acheson
- Highway 37 near Rivière Qui Barre; Highway 18 in Westlock
- North end: Highway 2 near Hondo

Location
- Country: Canada
- Province: Alberta
- Specialized and rural municipalities: Parkland County, Sturgeon County, Westlock County, Lesser Slave River No. 124 M.D.
- Towns: Westlock

Highway system
- Alberta Numbered Highway Network; List; Former
← Highway 43	→ Highway 45

Alberta Provincial Highway No. 44, commonly referred to as Highway 44, is a highway in northern Alberta, Canada that extends from Hondo to Highway 16 (Yellowhead Highway) east of Spruce Grove. It is the primary route between the Edmonton area and the Lesser Slave Lake region. The stretch between Highway 16 and Westlock was formerly Secondary Highway 794, but due to a large increase in traffic it was upgraded to Highway 44 in 1999. Highway 44 is approximately 172 kilometres (107 mi) long.

== Major intersections ==
From south to north:

Rural/specialized municipality	Location	km	mi	Destinations	Notes
Parkland County	Acheson	0.0	0.0	Highway 16 (TCH/YH) – Jasper, Edmonton	Interchange; Highway 16 exit 368
Sturgeon County	Villeneuve	9.9	6.2	Highway 633 – Alberta Beach, St. Albert	Roundabout
Sturgeon County		16.5	10.3	Highway 37 – Onoway, Fort Saskatchewan	
Sturgeon County	Rivière Qui Barre	23.3	14.5		
Sturgeon County		26.8	16.7	Highway 642 – Sandy Beach, Morinville	
Sturgeon County	Alcomdale	36.6	22.7	Township Road 570	Former Highway 650 west
Westlock County		43.0	26.7	Highway 651 – Busby, Legal	
Westlock		65.8	40.9	Highway 18 (100 Street) – Barrhead, Swan Hills, Clyde	
Westlock County		77.2	48.0	UAR 73 west – Pibroch	
Westlock County		86.9	54.0	Highway 601 west – Dapp	South end of Highway 601 concurrency
Westlock County		88.5	55.0	Highway 601 east / Highway 801 north – Rochester	North end of Highway 601 concurrency
Westlock County		102.3	63.6	UAR 81 west – Jarvie	
Westlock County	Fawcett	115.5	71.8	UAR 83 west	
Westlock County		117.7	73.1	Highway 663 east – Boyle	
M.D. of Lesser Slave River No. 124		132.3	82.2	UAR 82 west – Flatbush	
M.D. of Lesser Slave River No. 124		157.9	98.1	Township Road 684 – Chisholm	
M.D. of Lesser Slave River No. 124		171.6	106.6	Highway 2 – Slave Lake, Peace River, Athabasca	Continues as Highway 2 north
1.000 mi = 1.609 km; 1.000 km = 0.621 mi: Concurrency terminus
