= Alberta Highway 2 =

Highway in Alberta, Canada

Highway 2
- Highway 2 highlighted in red

Route information
- Maintained by the Ministry of Transportation and Economic Corridors
- Length: 1,273 km (Note: Average between northbound length of 1,272 km (790 mi) and southbound length of 1,274 km (792 mi)) (791 mi)

Major junctions
- South end: US 89 at U.S. border in Carway
- Highway 5 in Cardston; Highway 3 in Fort Macleod; Highway 201 in Calgary; Highway 1 (TCH) in Calgary; Highway 11 in Red Deer; Highway 216 in Edmonton; Highway 14 in Edmonton; Highway 16 (TCH) in Edmonton; Highway 49 near Donnelly; Highway 35 near Grimshaw
- North end: Highway 43 near Grande Prairie

Location
- Country: Canada
- Province: Alberta
- Specialized and rural municipalities: Cardston; Willow Creek; Foothills County; Rocky View; Mountain View; Red Deer; Lacombe; Ponoka; Wetaskiwin; Leduc; Sturgeon; Westlock; Athabasca; Lesser Slave River; Big Lakes; Smoky River; Northern Sunrise; Peace; Fairview; Birch Hills; Spirit River; Saddle Hills; Grande Prairie
- Major cities: Calgary, Airdrie, Red Deer, Lacombe, Leduc, Edmonton, St. Albert

Highway system
- Alberta Numbered Highway Network; List; Former
← Highway 1X	→ Highway 2A

Highway 2 (also known as the Queen Elizabeth II Highway between Calgary and Edmonton) (Note: Officially, the Queen Elizabeth II Highway (QEII) refers only to the section between the northern Calgary city limit at Stoney Trail (Highway 201) and the southern Edmonton city limit at 41 Avenue SW.) is a major highway in Alberta, Canada, that stretches from the Canada–United States border through Alberta's largest cities, Calgary and Edmonton, to Grande Prairie. Running primarily north to south for approximately 1,273 kilometres (791 mi), it is the longest and busiest highway in Alberta, carrying more than 150,000 vehicles per day near Downtown Calgary. The Fort Macleod–Edmonton section forms a portion of the CANAMEX Corridor that links Alaska with Mexico; while the Donnelly–Grimshaw section forms a portion of the Arctic Corridor that links Edmonton with the Northwest Territories. More than half of Alberta's 5 million residents live in the Calgary–Edmonton Corridor created by Highway 2.

U.S. Route 89 enters Alberta from Montana and becomes Highway 2, a two-lane, undivided road that traverses the foothills of southern Alberta to Fort Macleod where it intersects Highway 3 and becomes divided. In Calgary, the route is a busy freeway, Deerfoot Trail, that continues into central Alberta as the "Queen Elizabeth II Highway", bypassing Red Deer. In Edmonton, Highway 2 is briefly concurrent with freeway sections of Highways 216 and 16 before bisecting St. Albert and reverting to two lanes en route to Athabasca. It bends northwest along the south shore of Lesser Slave Lake as the Northern Woods and Water Route into High Prairie, before turning north to Peace River, west to Fairview, and finally south to Grande Prairie, where it ends at Highway 43.

Originally numbered as Highway 1, Highway 2 is the oldest major highway in Alberta and the first to stretch north into the Peace Country. It was historically known as the Calgary and Edmonton Trail, Sunshine Trail, and the Blue Trail. Major changes include the construction of a divided expressway between Calgary and Edmonton in the 1960s, realignment along Deerfoot Trail in Calgary the 1980s, and twinning south of Nanton in the 1990s. A Highway 43 realignment in 1998 shortened Highway 2 by nearly 90 kilometres (56 mi) to its current northern terminus in Grande Prairie; it previously extended west to British Columbia Highway 2 at the border. Several projects including median widening and interchange upgrades have been undertaken in the 2010s to increase the safety of the highway's busier sections, with further improvements either under construction or awaiting funding. Bypasses of Fort Macleod, Claresholm, and Nanton are planned as part of Alberta's effort to make its portion of the CANAMEX Corridor free-flowing from border to border.

== Route description ==
=== Overview ===
Much of Highway 2 is a core route in the National Highway System of Canada: between Fort Macleod and Edmonton and between Donnelly and Grimshaw. The posted speed limit along the majority of the highway between Fort Macleod and Morinville is 110 kilometres per hour (68 mph), with a brief section south of Leduc having a posted speed limit of 120 kilometres per hour (75 mph).. In urban areas, such as through Claresholm, Nanton, Calgary, and Edmonton, it ranges from 50 to 110 km/h (31 to 68 mph). During the winter, accidents are common on the stretch of the highway between Calgary and Edmonton as the weather can change rapidly and drivers underestimate the conditions, overwhelming emergency services attempting to respond. As the main north–south access in Alberta, Highway 2 is the preferred path of the CANAMEX Corridor. Between Fort Macleod and Morinville, Highway 2 maintains no fewer than four lanes of traffic and is largely a freeway between Okotoks and Edmonton, with improvements underway to eliminate the at-grade crossings that remain. Alberta Transportation and Economic Corridors has invested more than $2 billion in the highway since construction of the divided expressway between Calgary and Edmonton began in the 1960s.

=== Southern Alberta ===
==== Rocky Mountain Foothills ====
Alberta's Highway 2 begins at the United States border, as the two-lane U.S. Route 89 crosses into Canada at Carway, Alberta. The road proceeds north through the Rocky Mountain Foothills to a brief concurrency with Highway 501, before bisecting the town of Cardston. At the north end of town, the highway enters Blood Indian Reserve No. 148 and Highway 5 splits west to Waterton Lakes National Park; it is briefly concurrent with Highway 2 before splitting east to cross the St. Mary River en route to Magrath and Lethbridge. Highway 2 continues north to another short concurrency with Highway 505 during which it crosses the Waterton River to Stand Off, continuing across the Belly River to Fort Macleod in the Municipal District of Willow Creek.

Less than 1 kilometre (0.62 mi) before meeting Highway 3 southeast of Fort Macleod, Highway 2 becomes a divided highway. Highway 3 splits east to Lethbridge, and the combined Highways 2 and 3 turn due west through town as a divided highway at a speed limit of 50 km/h (31 mph), where Highway 2 assumes its CANMEX Corridor designation. West of town, the highways diverge at an interchange; Highway 3 continues west as the Crowsnest Highway to Pincher Creek and British Columbia, and Highway 2 turns north across the Oldman River as a four-lane, divided highway. It continues approximately 25 kilometres (16 mi) north to Granum from which Highway 519 splits to the east. In tandem with Highway 23, Highway 519 is often used by CANAMEX traffic to bypass Fort Macleod. Further north on Highway 2, the towns of Claresholm and Nanton are each bisected at a reduced speed limit of 50 km/h (31 mph). The highway is concurrent with Highway 533 for its brief distance through Nanton.

North of Nanton, the highway continues into the Foothills County to a major junction with Highways 23 and 2A at High River, after which it veers northwest to cross the Highwood River. On the other side of the river, a second interchange provides access to Okotoks via Highways 7 and 2A, and Highway 2 continues north across the Sheep River to De Winton where Highway 2A splits into southwest Calgary as Macleod Trail, and Highway 2 veers northeast toward the Bow River valley and southeast Calgary.

==== Calgary ====
From its split with Macleod Trail, Highway 2 becomes a 46-kilometre (29 mi) major freeway, Deerfoot Trail, which descends to cross the Bow River before entering Calgary's city limits. In the city, it crosses the river twice more, jogging back and forth between its east and west bank. The freeway intersects the Stoney Trail ring road at the south end of Calgary, with signage recommending that traffic en route to Calgary International Airport, Edmonton, and Medicine Hat use eastbound Stoney Trail as a bypass. Deerfoot Trail then merges with the major routes of Anderson Road and Bow Bottom Trail. Crossing Glenmore Trail (Highway 8), Memorial Drive (access to downtown Calgary) and 16 Avenue NE (Highway 1), Deerfoot Trail continues into north Calgary, past the Calgary International Airport en route to a second interchange with Stoney Trail at the Calgary city limit. The Deerfoot Trail designation is dropped, and the highway carries on north into Rocky View County.

=== Central Alberta ===
==== Queen Elizabeth II Highway ====
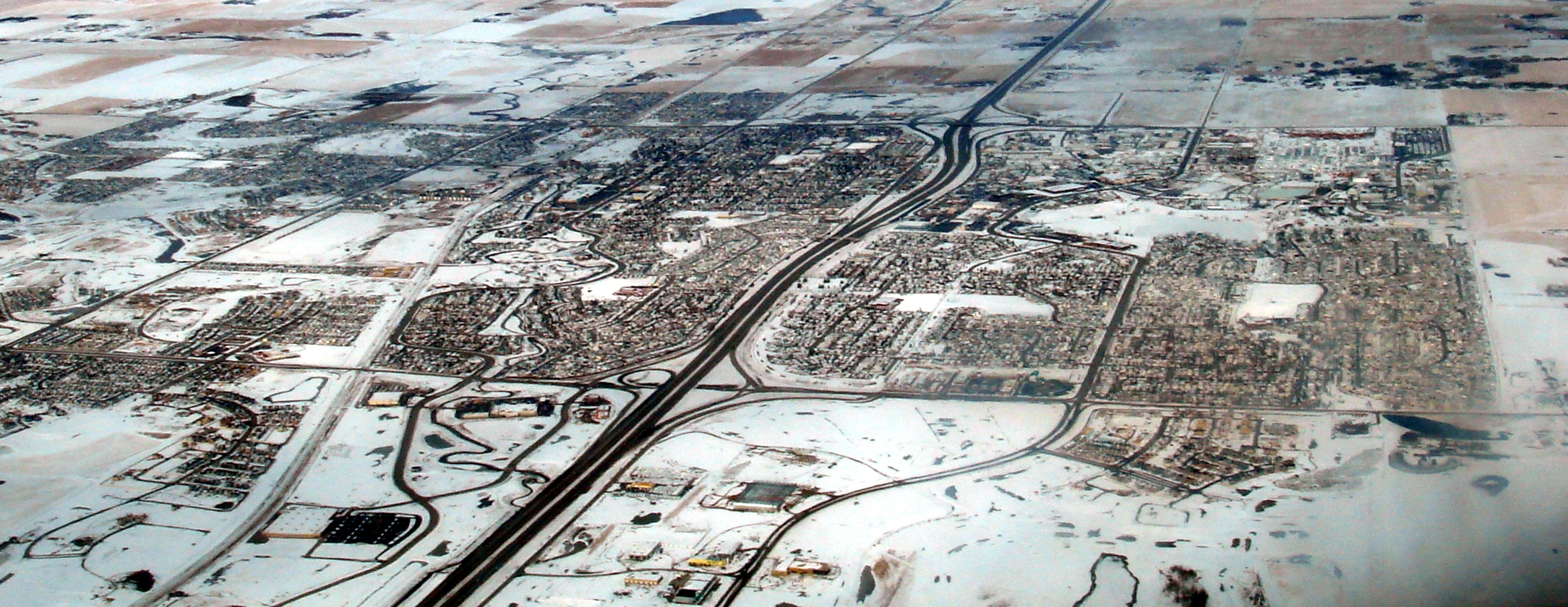
The Queen Elizabeth II Highway bisects Airdrie.

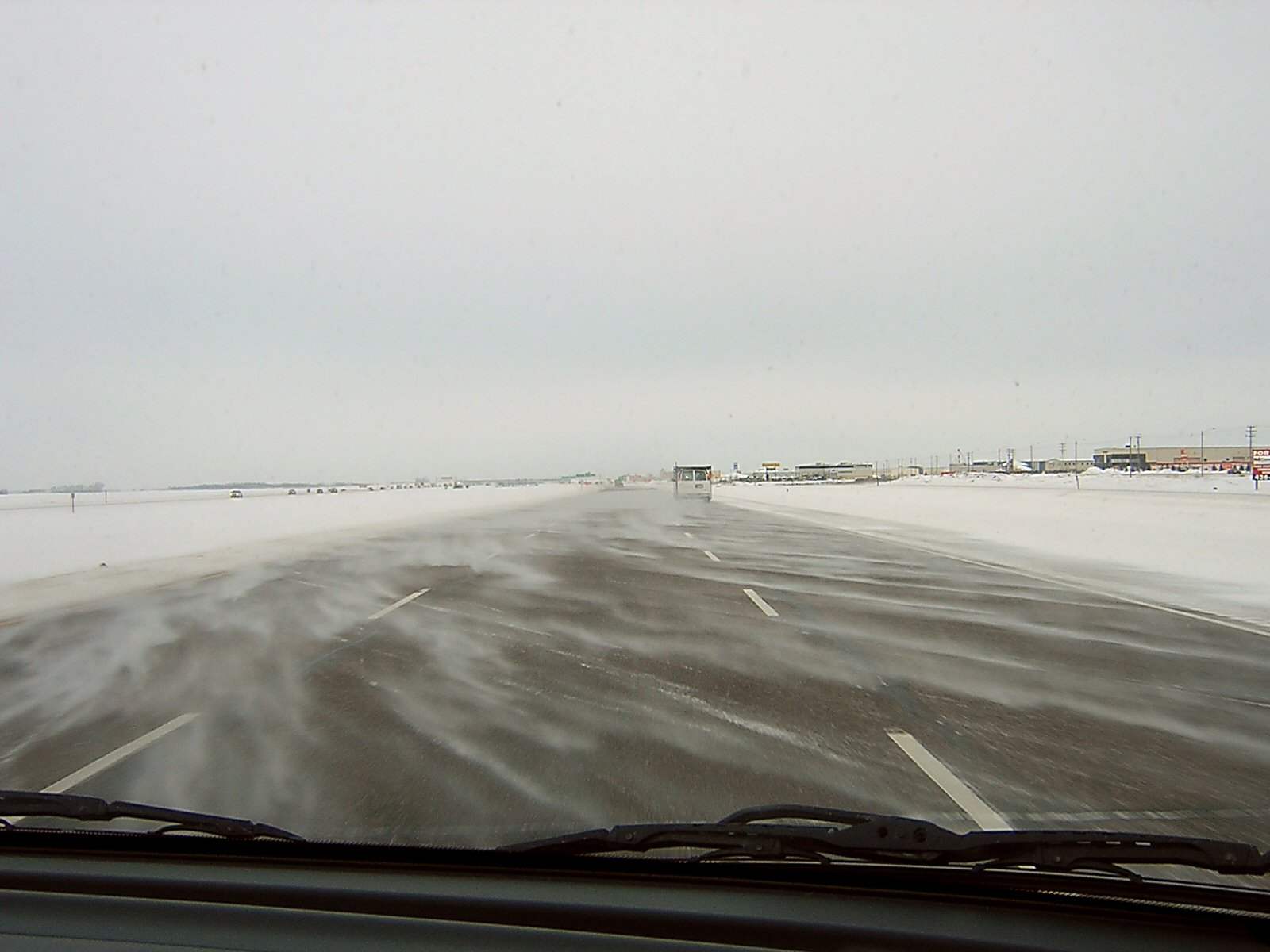
Queen Elizabeth II Highway between Leduc and Edmonton

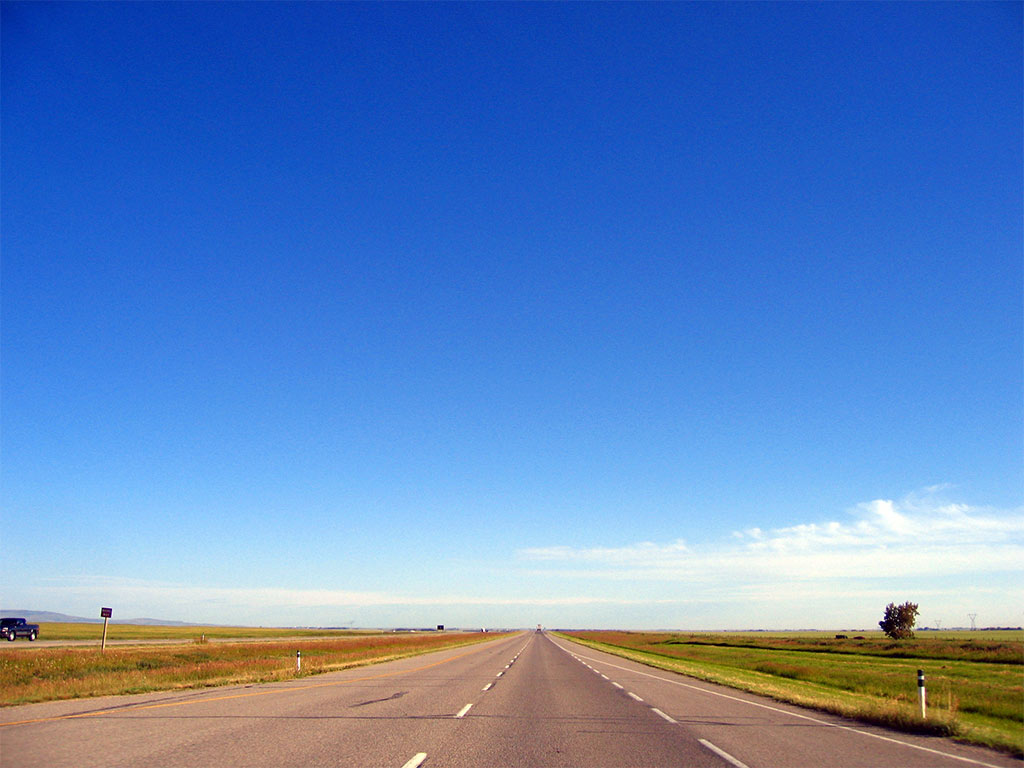
Highway 2 is a lightly travelled divided highway near Claresholm.

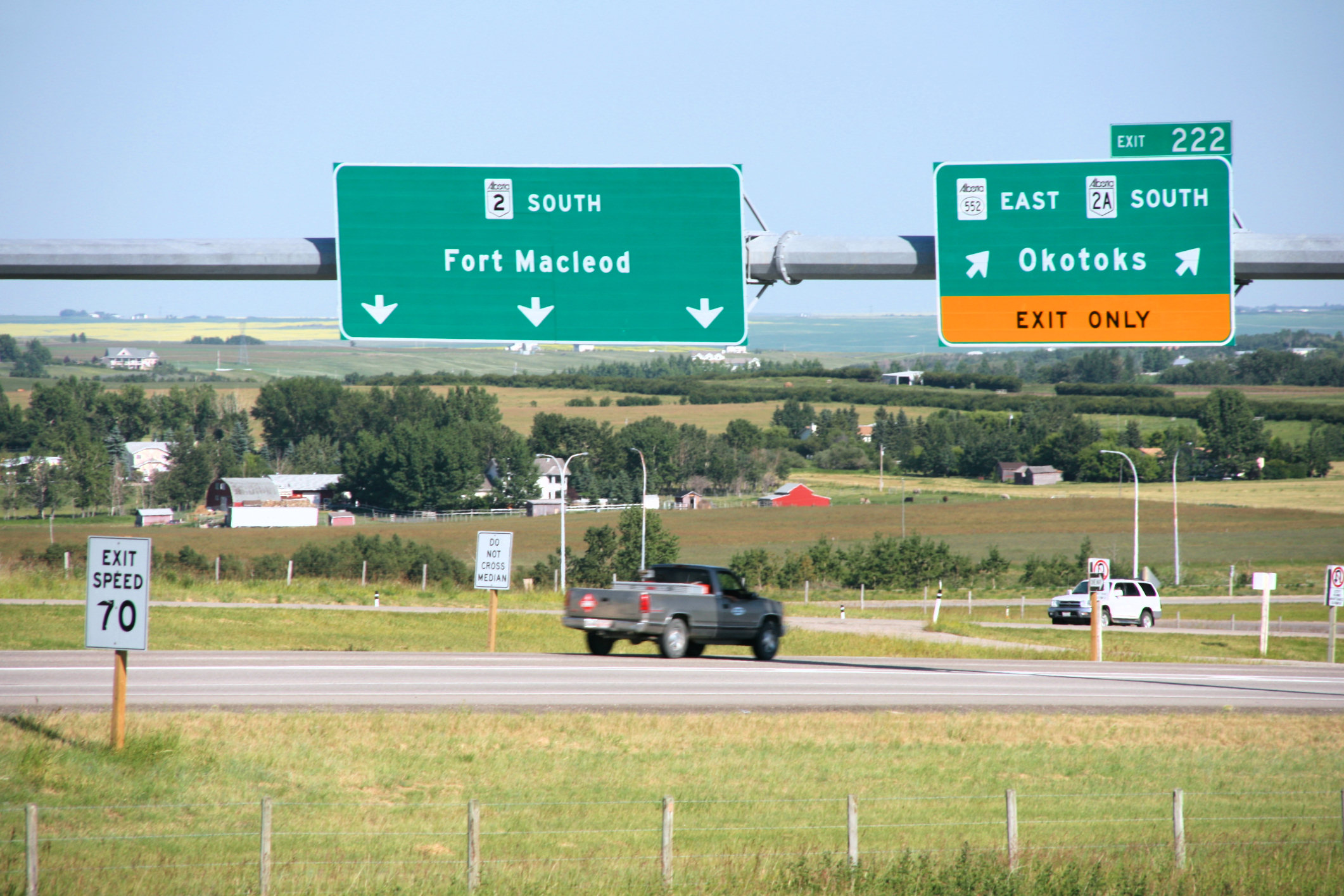
Near De Winton, Highway 2A splits to the southwest, connecting Calgary and Okotoks.

Highway 2 exits north Calgary as a 261-kilometre-long (162 mi) six-lane freeway called the "Queen Elizabeth II Highway", a name it retains until the southern city limit of Edmonton. It passes the major shopping centre of CrossIron Mills, bisecting the city of Airdrie several kilometres later. North of Airdrie, the route extends to Highway 72 before bypassing Crossfield and entering Mountain View County, continuing north past interchanges at Highways 581 and 582 leading to the communities of Carstairs and Didsbury, respectively. The highway meets Highway 27 at a cloverleaf interchange near Olds, approximately halfway between Calgary and Red Deer. Highway 2 enters Red Deer County and proceeds to interchanges with Highway 587 at Bowden, Highways 54 and 590 at Innisfail, and Highway 42 near Penhold prior to the city of Red Deer. South of the city, from McKenzie Road to 19 Street, the highway widens to six lanes through an area known as Gasoline Alley. It is a popular stop for travellers and truckers including fuel stations and food establishments on either side of the highway, accessible via the interchange at McKenzie Road. Continuing north, the highway again reduces to four lanes, veering left to bypass Red Deer to the west while Gaetz Avenue splits north into the city.

West of Red Deer, Highway 2 passes Red Deer College and the Alberta Sports Hall of Fame before descending into the valley of the Red Deer River. It crosses the river alongside a railroad bridge, then curves north to interchanges with Highways 11 and 11A, leading west to Rocky Mountain House and Sylvan Lake, respectively. North of 11A, the highway crosses the Blindman River into Lacombe County to an interchange with Highway 597 at Blackfalds, curving slightly northeast to an interchange at Highway 12 at Lacombe.

North of Lacombe, Highway 2 is again briefly concurrent with Highway 2A before reaching Highway 53 near Ponoka just after crossing the Battle River. The four-lane highway continues approximately 30 kilometres (19 mi) through gentle rolling hills of aspen parkland in Ponoka County to an interchange at Highway 611 where it enters Wetaskiwin County. Near Bearhills Lake, the highway meets Highway 13, providing access east to Wetaskiwin and Camrose, and west to Pigeon Lake. North of an interchange with Highway 616 the highway enters Leduc County, bending northeast toward the city of Leduc.

After entering Leduc city limits, Highway 2 meets Highway 2A, which proceeds southeast through Leduc's southern suburbs as a four lane arterial road. Highway 2 immediately travels over Highway 39 at a diamond interchange, serving as the main access to central Leduc and ultimately leading west to Drayton Valley. Now six lanes wide, Highway 2 curves slightly to the northeast to pass on the east side of Edmonton International Airport, still 13 kilometres (8.1 mi) south of Edmonton's city limits. The grass median significantly widens to over 100 metres (330 ft), and access to the airport and Nisku is provided by an interchange at Airport Road. Traffic levels increase as commuters travel to and from the Leduc area to Edmonton, and the highway meets a second interchange at Highway 19/625 which serves the airport. The highway curves slightly to the northeast to an interchange at 41 Avenue SW, marking the Edmonton city limit and the end of the "Queen Elizabeth II Highway" designation.

==== Edmonton and Sturgeon County ====
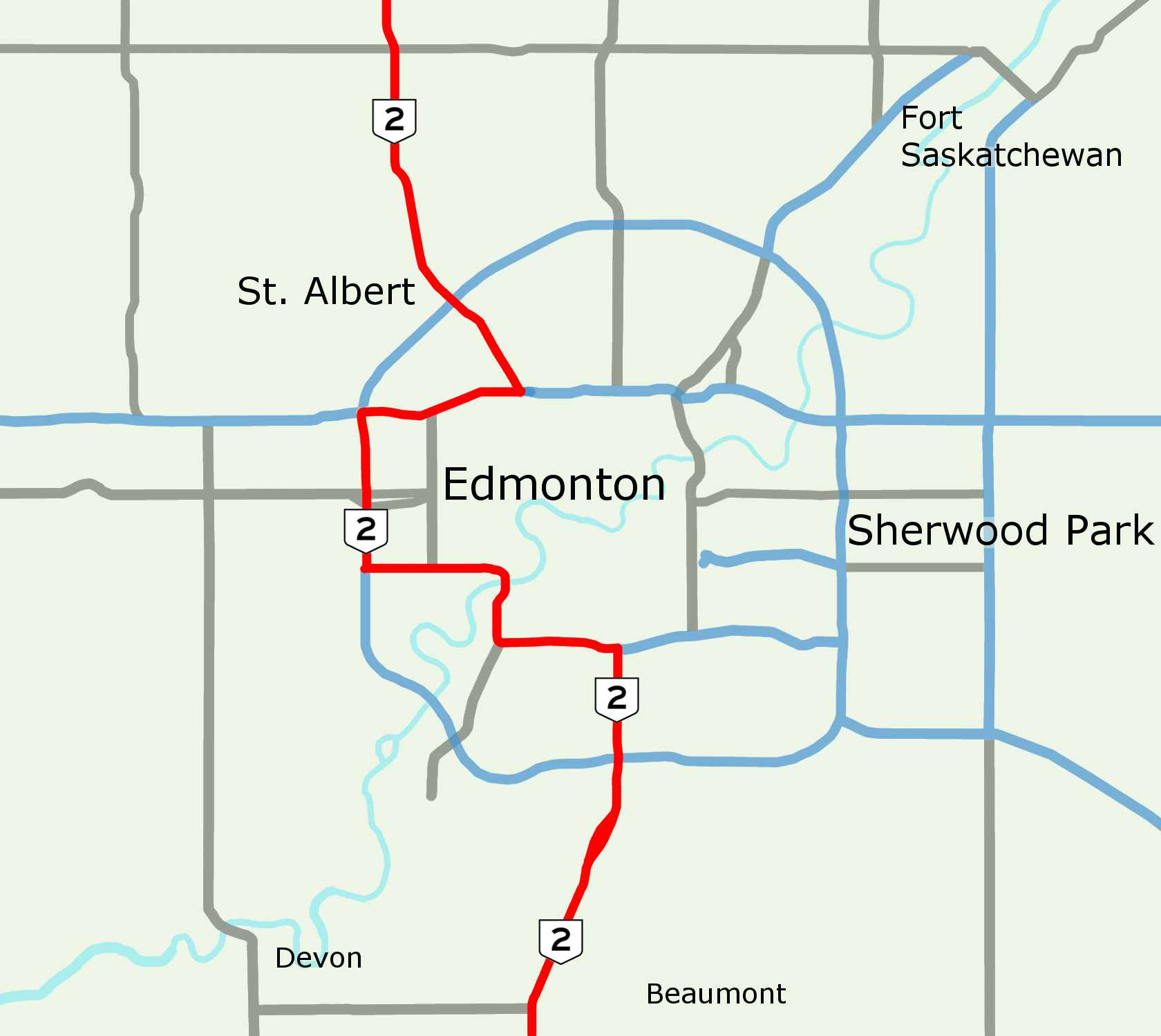
In Edmonton, Highway 2 follows Calgary Trail/Gateway Blvd, Whitemud Drive, Anthony Henday Drive, Yellowhead Trail, and St. Albert Trail.

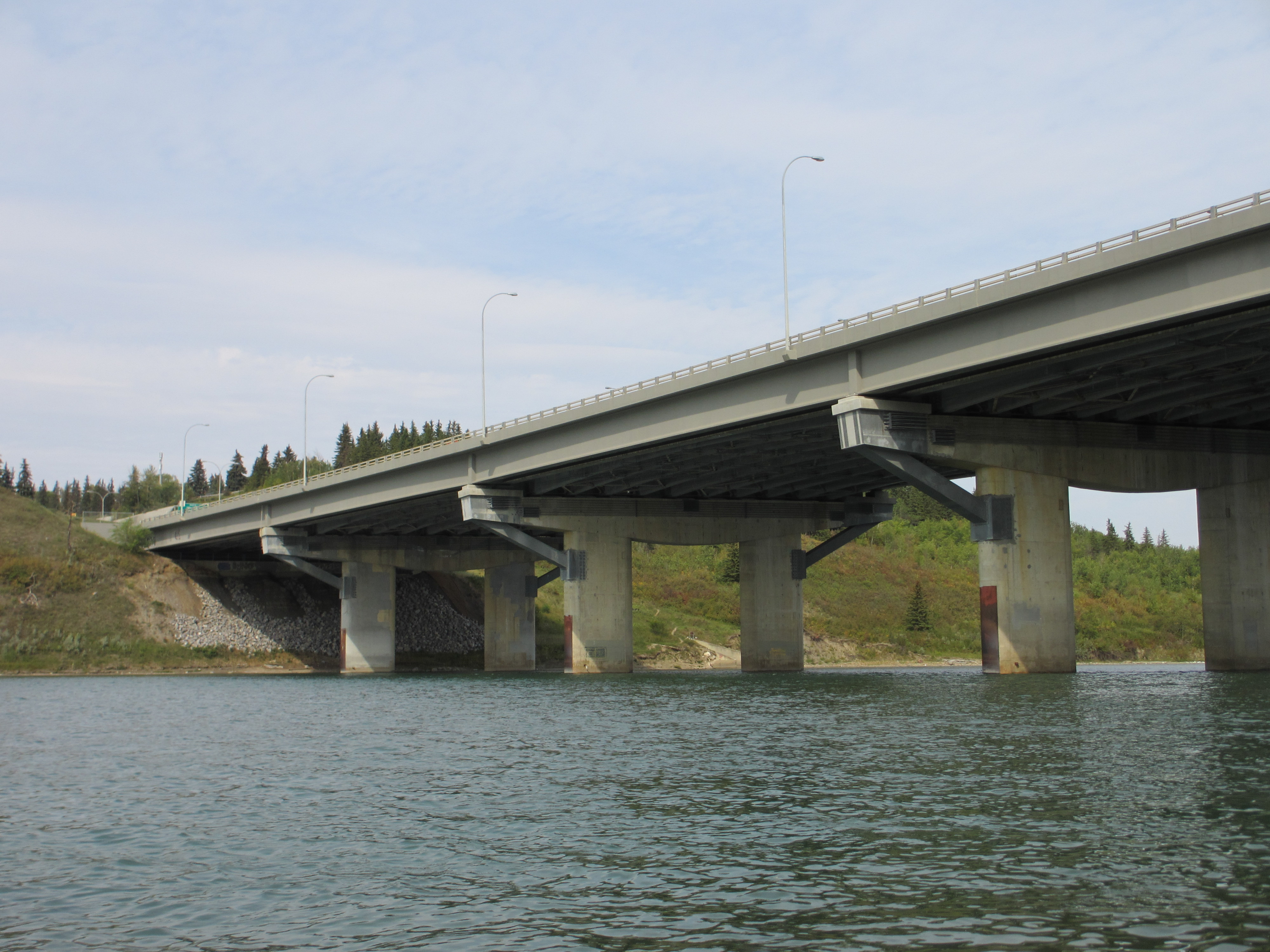
The Quesnell Bridge, built in 1968, carries Highway 2 over the North Saskatchewan River in central Edmonton

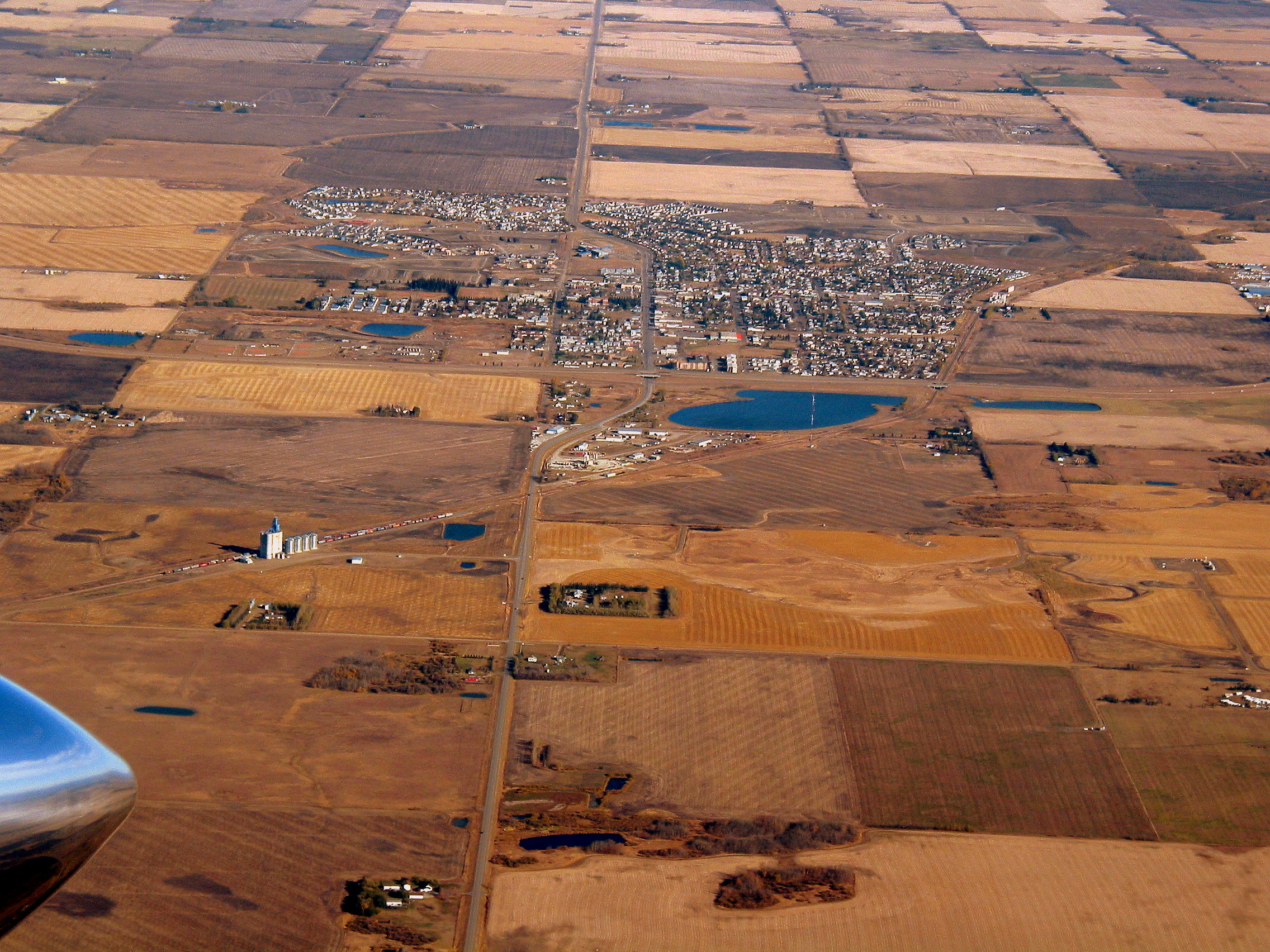
Looking east at Morinville; Highway 2 passes west of the town

Five separately named routes are designated as Highway 2 in the cities of Edmonton and St. Albert, denoted by varying levels of signage. At the south end of Edmonton, the highway significantly widens to five lanes each way. The northbound lanes become Gateway Boulevard and the southbound lanes Calgary Trail, and the two carriageways diverge to pass Gateway Park, located in the median of the highway and accessible from both directions. North of the park, the two directions of travel come back together, now at a reduced speed limit of 90 km/h (56 mph), to meet at the major east–west arterial of Ellerslie Road, providing access to Edmonton's southern residential areas of Heritage Valley, Ellerslie, and Summerside. This diamond interchange is intertwined with the major cloverstack interchange at Anthony Henday Drive (Highway 216) which immediately follows. Henday is a ring road that surrounds Edmonton, connecting Highway 2 with Highway 16. Signage directs traffic destined for Lloydminster, Cold Lake, and Fort McMurray to use the southeast portion of Henday to reach Highway 16 north of Sherwood Park. Traffic destined for Jasper, along with the CANAMEX Corridor, is directed onto the southwest portion of Henday to reach Highway 16 at Edmonton's west end.

The freeway ends as three lanes of Gateway Boulevard eventually widen to four, travelling north past South Edmonton Common through south Edmonton as a busy urban street to Whitemud Drive. Calgary Trail carries the southbound lanes of Highway 2 approximately 225 metres (738 ft) to the west of Gateway Boulevard. The designation of Highway 2 turns west onto Whitemud Drive and it becomes a freeway once again, though now only at 80 km/h (50 mph), unlike the 100-kilometre-per-hour (62 mph) limit of the highway through Calgary.

Whitemud Drive descends to cross Whitemud Creek before curving north to span the North Saskatchewan River on the Quesnell Bridge. It then turns back west to meet Anthony Henday Drive again, now in the vicinity of West Edmonton Mall. Henday assumes the designation of Highway 2 for a 6.7-kilometre (4.2 mi) stretch to Yellowhead Trail (Highway 16), though the concurrency is unsigned. Yellowhead Trail continues east into Edmonton as a six-lane freeway, again unsigned as Highway 2, until St. Albert Trail which proceeds northwest through light industrial and commercial areas before crossing Anthony Henday Drive to exit Edmonton into St. Albert. The six-lane road is the main artery of the city with a speed limit of 60 km/h (37 mph), and crosses the Sturgeon River before exiting the city to the north into Sturgeon County as a divided highway approximately 5 kilometres (3.1 mi) beyond the Sturgeon River. North of the city, the highway intersects Highway 37 before an interchange at Highway 642 west of Morinville, the main access for the town.

=== Northern Alberta ===
==== Westlock County and Athabasca ====
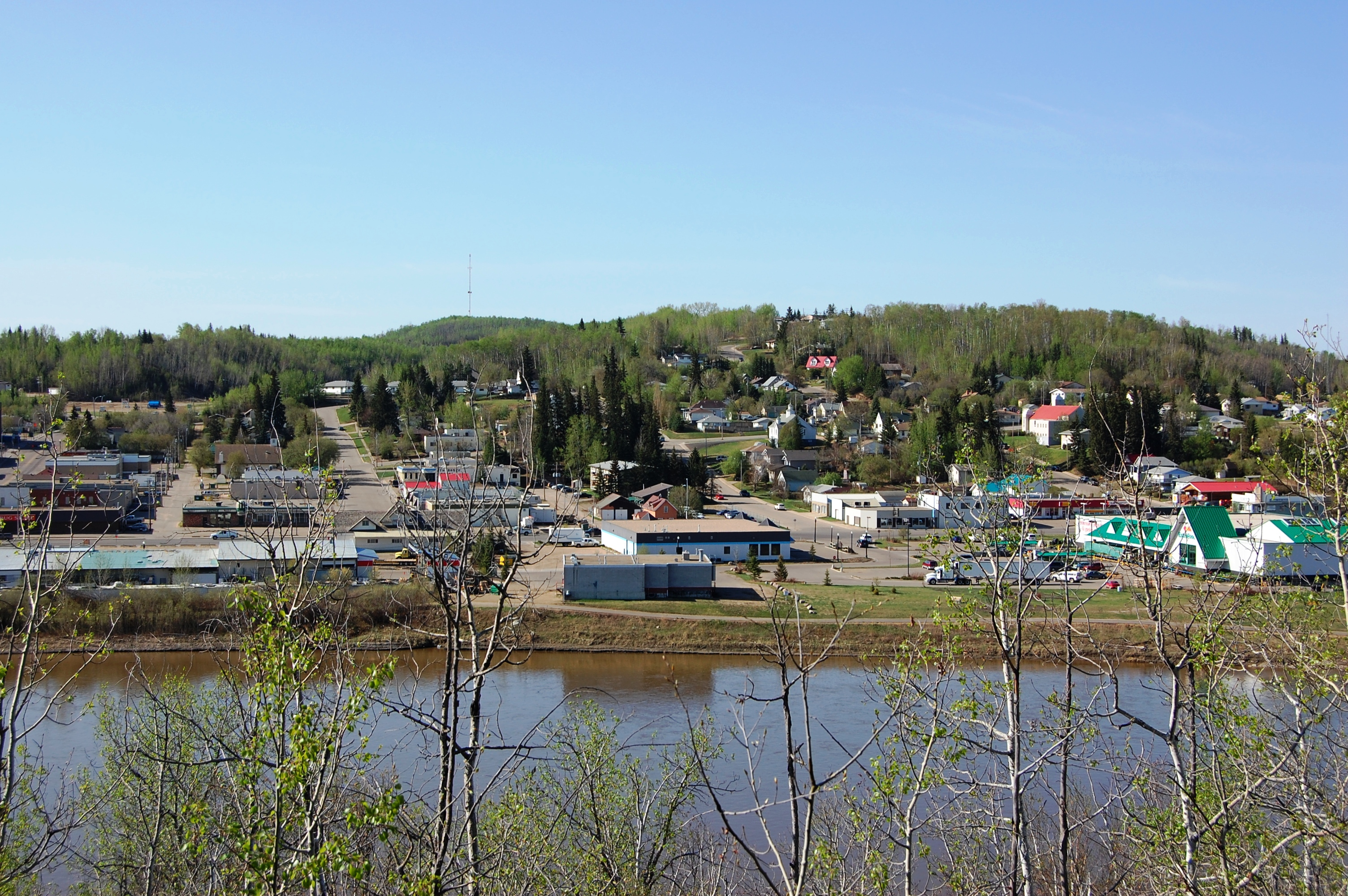
West of the town of Athabasca, Highway 2 is part of the Northern Woods and Water Route

Highway 2 reduces to a two-lane highway immediately after Morinville, extending north past Manawan and Haley Lakes into Westlock County and a three-way intersection with Highway 18 near Clyde and Westlock. The highway turns due east, briefly concurrent with Highway 18 for 1 kilometre (0.62 mi), before turning northeast through increasingly wooded areas and a short concurrency with Highway 663 to Athabasca. The highway descends through the town at 50 km/h (31 mph) as 50 Street toward the Athabasca River valley, before turning west to parallel the river as 50 Avenue. From this point until its split with Highway 49 over 200 kilometres (120 mi) to the west, Highway 2 is designated as the Northern Woods and Water Route.

The speed limit returns to 100 km/h (62 mph) as the highway climbs from the valley toward Baptiste Lake. At the lake, the two lane Highway 2 turns north to follow the west bank of the Athabasca River for approximately 35 kilometres (22 mi) before turning west at Lawrence Lake toward the unincorporated community of Hondo. There, it meets the northern terminus of Highway 44 before crossing the river and continuing northwest for 50 km to the southern terminus of Highway 88 in Slave Lake. Highway 88 follows the east bank of Lesser Slave Lake before a long journey north to Fort Vermilion. In Slave Lake, Highway 2 bisects the town at a limit of 60 km/h (37 mph), before returning to 100 km/h west of Caribou Trail, following the scenic southern shore of Lesser Slave Lake to Highway 33 near Kinuso, which leads south to Swan Hills. At Driftpile, the highway crosses a river of the same name en route to High Prairie at the west end of Lesser Slave Lake.

==== Peace Country ====
14 kilometres (8.7 mi) west of High Prairie, the highway turns north past Winagami Lake to the town of McLennan on the south shore of Kimiwan Lake. It carries on west to a junction with Highway 49, locally known as 'Donnelly Corner', where it becomes part of the Arctic Corridor. The two lane highway proceeds north through aspen parkland past Lac Magloire to the town of Nampa, after which it crosses the Heart River, a tributary of Peace River. The highway then curves to the northwest and descends along the steep east bank of the Heart River into the town of Peace River. A passing lane aids eastbound traffic climbing from the valley.

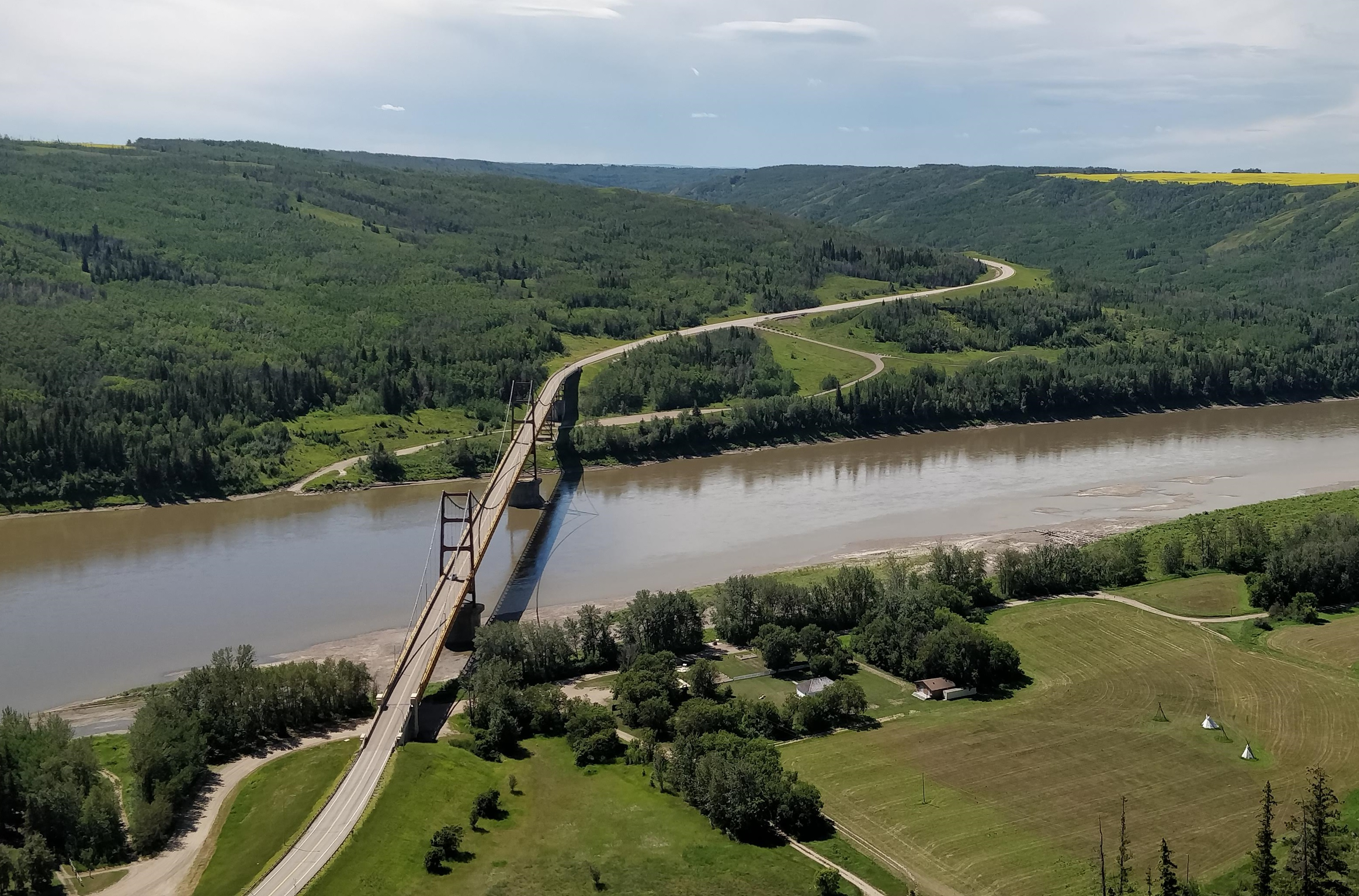
Highway 2 over the Peace River on the Dunvegan Bridge

The two lane highway continues west through the town of Peace River before crossing the river of the same name. Climbing on the west bank of the river, it widens to four lanes and meets Alberta Highway 684 (Shaftesbury Trail) before exiting Peace River, reducing to two lanes, and passing north of Peace River Airport. 5 kilometres (3.1 mi) east Cardinal Lake, Highway 2 meets Highway 35, the Mackenzie Highway. Highway 2 turns south to Grimshaw, while Highway 35 and Arctic Corridor turn north, following the Peace River to High Level. Highway 2 bisects Grimshaw as 51 Street, then exits the town before turning west shortly thereafter, winding through the aspen parkland of the Peace Country to the town of Fairview, in which a campus of Grande Prairie Regional College is immediately south of the highway. The road continues west out of Fairview as Highway 64A, while Highway 2 turns south to exit the town, curving west then south again toward the Peace River valley. It again curves west to descend along the river's steep north bank. The highway crosses the Peace River on the Dunvegan Bridge, a suspension bridge over 700 metres (2,300 ft) long. Passing lanes assist traffic climbing from the valley on both sides of the river.

The highway continues 20 kilometres (12 mi) south to the town of Rycroft, where Highway 49 splits west carrying the remainder of the Northern Woods and Water Route to the British Columbia border. Highway 2 continues south to Highway 59 where it becomes a divided highway before bisecting Sexsmith and continuing to Highway 43 north of Grande Prairie, its northern terminus from 1998 to 2019. Prior to 1998, Highway 2 followed Highway 43 into British Columbia, where it became British Columbia Highway 2 to Dawson Creek. In 2019, when Highway 43 was moved to Highway 43X and bypassed Grande Prairie, Highway 2 was extended 2.4 kilometres (1.5 mi) south to the Grande Prairie city limits along its former, pre-1998 alignment; in Grande Prairie, Highway 2 becomes 100 Street.

=== Traffic ===
==== Volume ====
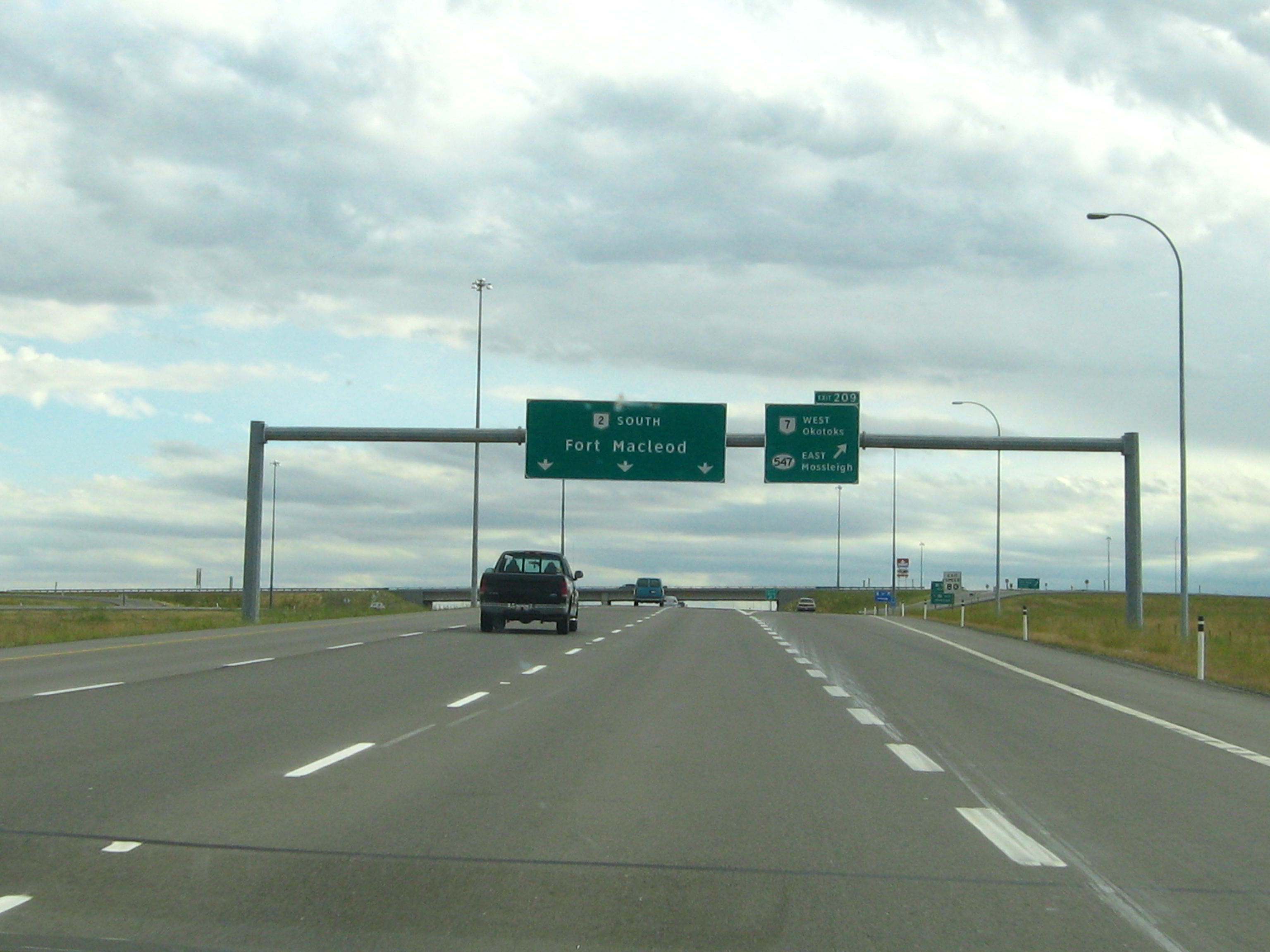
Near Okotoks, Highway 2 carried more than 54,000 vehicles per day in 2019

Highway 2 has a wide range of traffic levels along its length. At the south end, the highway is a lightly travelled two-lane road from the United States border to Fort Macleod. It then doubles to four lanes and volume progressively increases until De Winton north of Okotoks, but remains relatively light. Within Calgary, volume climbs exponentially on Deerfoot Trail through the southern suburbs of the city reaching more than 170,000 vehicles per day at Memorial Drive near downtown, making that stretch of Highway 2 the busiest roadway in western Canada. Volume swiftly drops north of Beddington Trail in Calgary, but remains moderate on the Queen Elizabeth II Highway until Edmonton where it again increases to nearly 100,000 vehicles per day south of the city. Whitemud Drive, Anthony Henday Drive, Yellowhead Trail, and St. Albert Trail are all busy expressways carrying large volumes of local traffic, especially at peak hours. North of St. Albert the drop in traffic is brisk, increasingly so after Morinville where the highway is no longer divided. Volume remains very light through most of the Peace Country before briefly exceeding 20,000 vehicles per day near the northern terminus in Grande Prairie.

Alberta Transportation publishes yearly traffic volume data for provincial highways. The table compares the annual average daily traffic (AADT) at several locations along Highway 2 using data from 2019, expressed as an average daily vehicle count over the span of a year (AADT).

Location	Volume
Cardston	5,450
Fort Macleod	6,110
High River	18,760
Memorial Dr; Calgary	173,500
32 St; Red Deer	51,940
Nisku	99,710
Morinville	6,400
Peace River	14,430
Grande Prairie	23,620

==== Enforcement and collisions ====
The Queen Elizabeth II Highway between Calgary and Edmonton is prone to collisions in the winter, sometimes resulting in hours of delay, closures, and redirection of traffic onto sections of the adjacent Highway 2A. Deerfoot Trail in Calgary is also prone to a higher than average number of collisions due to its high volume and concentration of interchanges within a relatively short distance.

Alberta Transportation has established several zones on the Queen Elizabeth II Highway where the 110-kilometre-per-hour (68 mph) speed limit is enforced by aircraft. The program is conducted by the Royal Canadian Mounted Police, and was relaunched in 2013 after being on hiatus due to budget concerns. Several aircraft are used including the Eurocopter AS350 helicopter. The number of tickets written during the operation is generally not enough to negate the cost of operating the aircraft, but police have stated that they are catching drivers committing infractions over a longer stretch of the road. In 2016, Leduc proposed photo radar speed enforcement on Highway 2 between the south end of the city and Edmonton's southern limit to catch excessive speeders, pending provincial approval. It is already in use within Edmonton and Leduc limits, but it would be the first implementation on Highway 2. Some residents complained that revenue was the main objective of the project. Leduc mayor Greg Krischke said that the project is not a "cash cow" and the primary objective is to reduce excessive speed and increase safety for first responders. An Alberta Transportation study shows that 100,000 vehicles exceeded 140 km/h (87 mph) on the stretch in 2015, and Krischke said that drivers who do not want tickets should abide by the speed limit. However, in 2014, less than 10% of injury collisions in Alberta involved drivers travelling at unsafe speeds. Tailgating was a factor in almost 50% of injury collisions.

== History ==
=== Early years ===
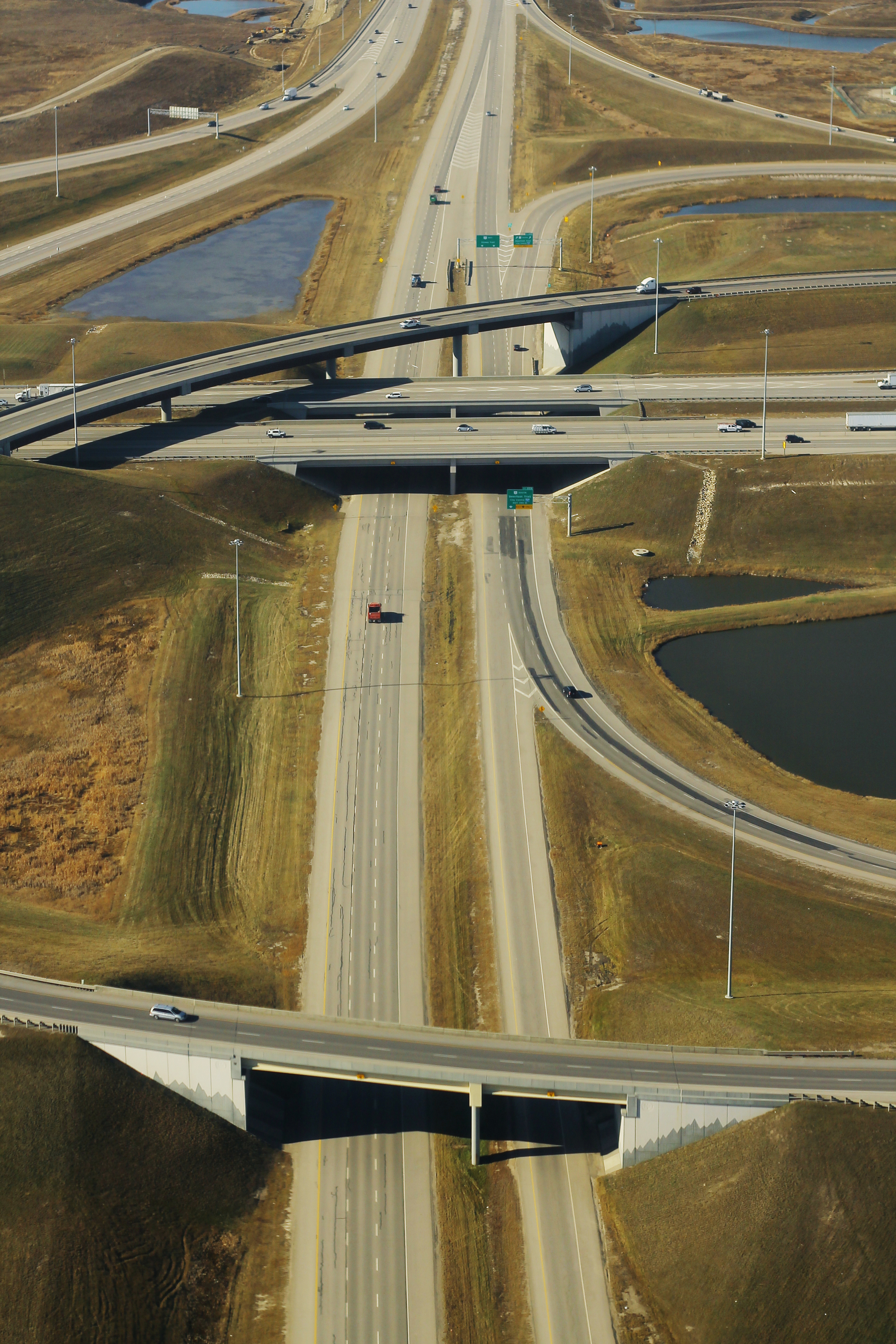
Looking west on Stoney Trail NE at its interchange with Deerfoot Trail in north Calgary

Trails in the vicinity of the Calgary–Edmonton Corridor long predate the province of Alberta itself, which was not split from the Northwest Territories until 1905. The Calgary and Edmonton Trail was established as several trails ran south from a fur trade post that had been established at Fort Edmonton prior to 1800. The northern portion of the route between Calgary and Edmonton was traveled by David Thompson in 1800. The more modern trail was blazed by John McDougall in 1873 as far as Morley and extended to Calgary two years later. Development of the trail allowed mail service between Calgary and Edmonton in July 1883.

By 1930, the entire present-day alignment of Highway 2 through to the British Columbia west of Grande Prairie had already been established as the Sunshine Trail. It was a gravelled highway that ran from the US border at Carway directly through Macleod, Calgary, Red Deer and Edmonton to Clyde where it became a dirt road. North of Clyde, it was the only highway that extended north into the Peace Country, bending east to Athabasca then northwest to Peace River. A secondary dirt road proceeded southwest to Dunvegan and the current terminus at Grande Prairie.

When Alberta highways first received numbers, the present-day Highway 2 was originally designated as Highway 1. When the major east—west route through Calgary that had been previously designated as Highway 2 was assigned to the Trans-Canada Highway, the province's major north—south route became Highway 2. A review of historical Alberta official road maps shows this to be the case prior to 1941. Highway 2 is one of the oldest major highways in Alberta, and the first to stretch north into the Peace Country as it long predates Highways 43 and 63.

=== Later years ===
The intermittent sections of two-lane road between Calgary and Edmonton now designated as Highway 2A previously comprised the primary route between Calgary and Edmonton, Passing through Carstairs, the heart of Red Deer, Blackfalds, Ponoka, and Wetaskiwin. Plans were developed in the late 1950s for a new four-lane superhighway to connect Calgary and Edmonton, creating a safer route that would bypass most of the communities along the way. The plan to bypass Red Deer and Lacombe was presented by minister Gordon Taylor on September 15, 1960, at a meeting in Red Deer. The new $7 million divided highway would alleviate congestion on the existing route through Red Deer, splitting from the existing route south of the city and veering west to cross the Red Deer and Blindman Rivers before rejoining the old highway north of Lacombe. The routing was somewhat of a surprise to residents, who had expected the new bypass to pass east of the city. The previous route had been carrying 5,000 vehicles per day. The bypass opened on November 21, 1962. The previous segment of two-lane highway to the east, which had been carrying 5,000 vehicles per day prior to the opening of the expressway, was renamed Highway 2A and now carries commuter traffic over the Blindman River between Blackfalds and Red Deer.

In northern Alberta, 1966 saw work begin on initial grading for Highway 2 in the vicinity of Peace River. The section from Hondo to Slave Lake was completed and opened to traffic on October 18, 1966. The 8-span, 125-metre (410 ft) bridge over the Peace River was completed in 1968. An interchange at the highway's DeWinton turnoff south of Calgary was planned for 1974.

On May 23, 2005, the section between Calgary and Edmonton was renamed the "Queen Elizabeth II Highway" in honour of the Queen's visit to Alberta as part of the province's centennial celebrations; the first road sign was personally unveiled by the Queen. It was the first highway in Canada to be named for her. Commemorative plaques were installed at Gateway Park south of Edmonton and at the Dickson-Stevenson Rest Area north of Calgary to mark the designation.

The section of Highway 2 through Calgary developed in phases. The initial freeway segment, from the north Calgary city limit south to 16 Avenue NE, opened in 1971 when the city's population was approximately 400,000. An extension to 17 Avenue SE followed in 1975; the 1980 phase, reaching Glenmore Trail, was shifted east of the original planned alignment after community opposition to routing the expressway through the Inglewood neighbourhood. A further southern section to Highway 22X opened in 1982, with the alignment again shifted east to preserve the newly established Fish Creek Provincial Park, and a final extension across the Bow River toward De Winton was completed in 2003. Alberta Transportation assumed management of the route from the City of Calgary in 2001. The expressway had been named Deerfoot Trail in 1974 to honour Api-kai-ees, a Siksika Nation runner who competed professionally in the 1880s under the name "Deerfoot". Born around 1864, Api-kai-ees was a nephew of Siksika head chief Isapo-muxika (Crowfoot); in 1886 he completed a ten-mile race in Calgary in 54 minutes 30 seconds and won a 16-hour endurance race covering 84 miles.

Twinning south of Calgary continued in the 1990s. A Highway 43 realignment in 1998 shortened Highway 2 by nearly 90 km (56 mi) to its current northern terminus in Grande Prairie; it previously extended west to British Columbia Highway 2 at the border. Several projects including median widening and interchange upgrades were completed in the 2010s that increased the safety of the highway's busier sections.

In the early morning hours of December 15, 2011, a Lethbridge man killed three people on Highway 2 immediately north of Claresholm. The man turned the gun on himself in a murder–suicide.

During the May 2011 Slave Lake wildfire, which burned approximately a third of the town of Slave Lake, Highway 2 southeast toward Athabasca served as the primary designated evacuation route for residents. Road closures elsewhere in the region hampered the response, and provincial officials warned that residents should not attempt to use highways that were not confirmed open.

Work began in 2016 to straighten the alignment of Highway 2 at the south end of Red Deer. The project included demolition of an existing bridge and construction of four new bridges for Highway 2. A substandard curve was removed and straightened, and a left entrance to Highway 2 for southbound traffic from Gaetz Avenue was reconstructed to crossover to the west side of the highway before joining the southbound lanes from the right side in a more conventional configuration. The existing bridges on this section of the highway had been constructed in 1962. The project was completed in 2018.

== Future ==
=== Southern Alberta ===
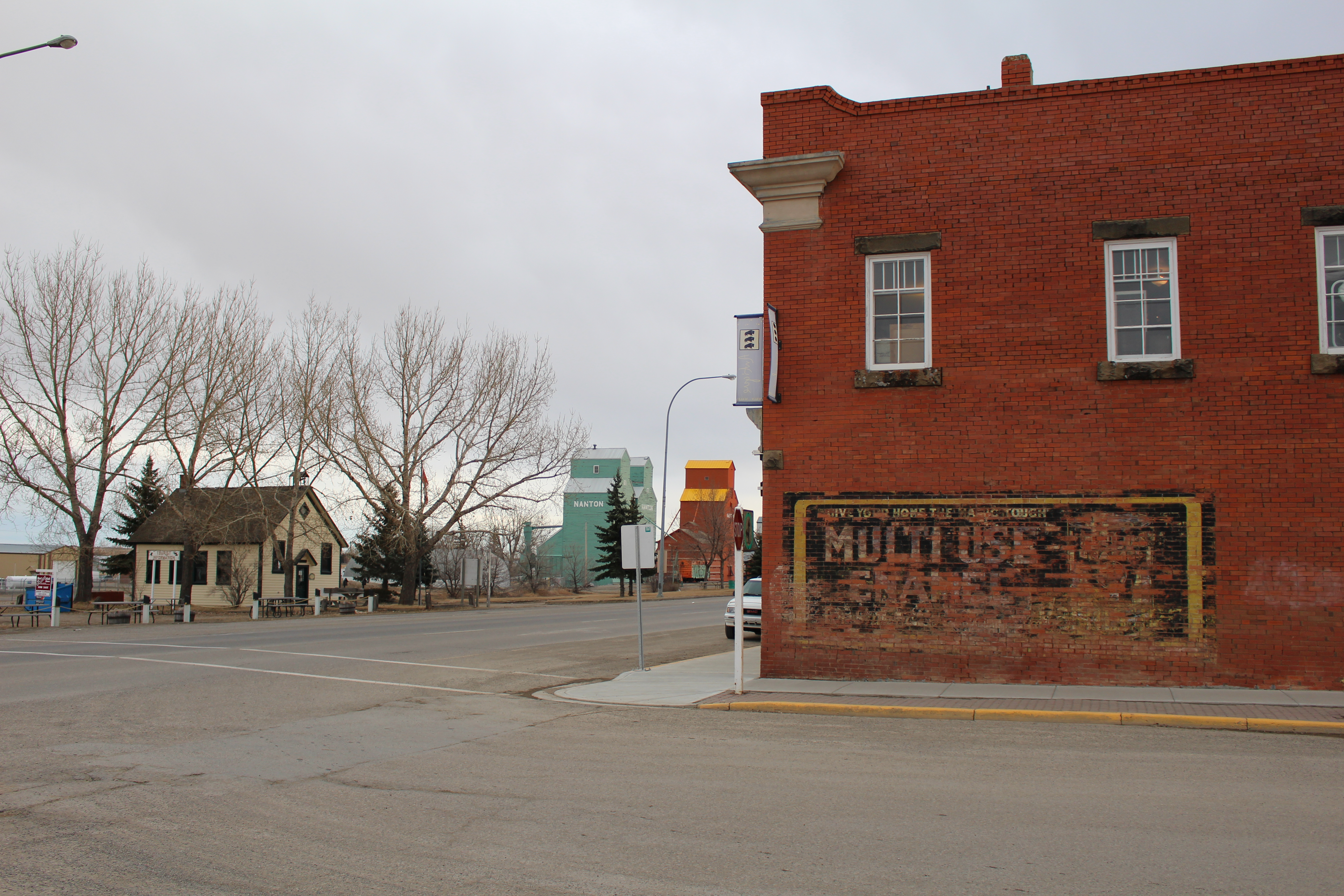
A freeway bypass of Nanton is proposed, where the two directions of Highway 2 are one-way streets, 160 m (520 ft) apart

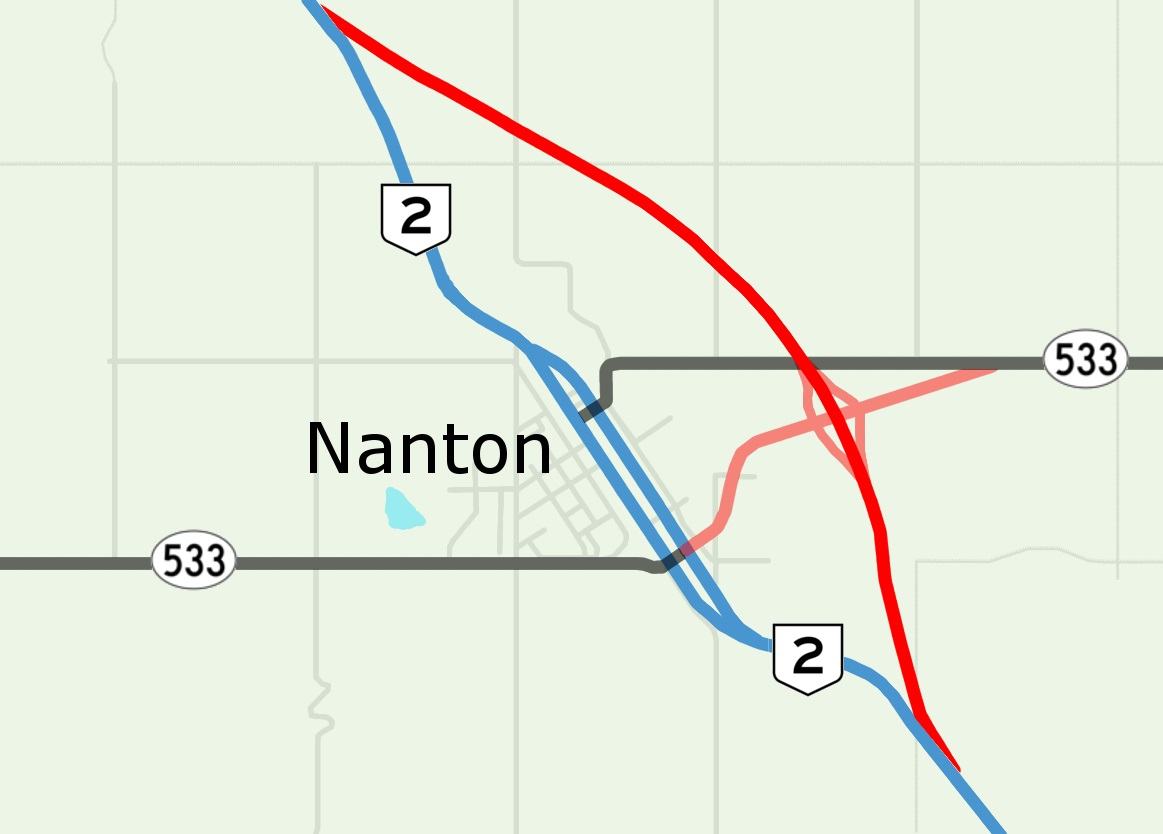
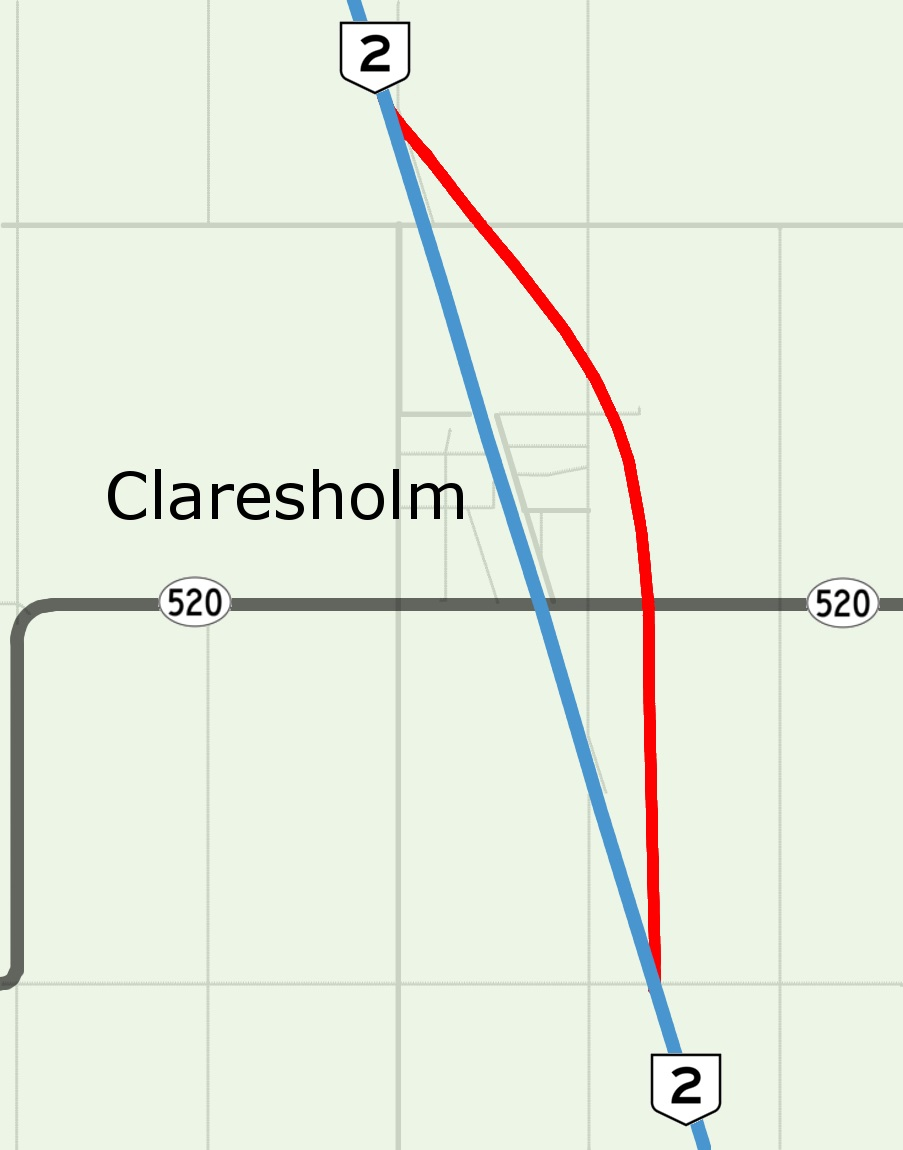
Proposed bypasses of Nanton (top) and Claresholm (bottom)

Highway 2 from Fort Macleod to south Edmonton is part of the CANAMEX Corridor, a divided highway with a combination of interchanges and several at-grade intersections except for a 50-kilometre (31 mi) fully controlled-access freeway section in Calgary. The only set of traffic lights on this CANAMEX section are in central Claresholm; a bypass is proposed that would carry Highway 2 to the east of town on a new free-flowing alignment. A similar bypass to the east of Nanton is also proposed. A bypass of Fort Macleod has also been planned, tentatively designated as Highway 2X. It would be constructed in conjunction with a Highway 3 bypass of the town, making both routes free-flowing through the area. Plans have also been drafted for significant reconstruction of the interchange of Highway 2 and Highway 23 near High River. The existing cloverleaf interchange was built in 1967 and does not meet the current standards in Alberta's Highway Design Guide.

In Calgary, where Highway 2 (Deerfoot Trail) experiences heavy congestion at peak hours, a major planning study is underway to determine the best course of action for upgrades to the freeway. In 2007, a study was completed by Alberta outlining plans for upgrades to the partial cloverleaf interchange of Glenmore Trail and Deerfoot Trail, one of the busiest road junctions in the province. Stage 1 of the proposed improvements would correct a pinch point on Deerfoot Trail by constructing a new three lane bridge to carry the northbound lanes over Glenmore. The southbound lanes would then be realigned on the existing bridges, such that Deerfoot Trail would be three lanes each way through the interchange, up from two.

=== Central and northern Alberta ===
Planning is underway to convert the Queen Elizabeth II Highway between Calgary and Edmonton to a freeway. Near Red Deer, traffic levels are close to 50,000 vehicles per day, and Alberta Transportation begins consideration of widening to six lanes when levels exceed 30,000 vehicles per day.

Beginning in late 2025, Alberta Transportation undertook widening of approximately 11 kilometres (6.8 mi) of Highway 2 through Red Deer in three sections. Section A replaces a CN railway overpass north of the city and widens the route to six lanes; completion is targeted for fall 2027. Section B extends the six-lane profile south through the Highway 11 and Highway 11A interchange area, with construction scheduled for 2026–27. Section C, the most extensive phase, widens the highway to eight lanes between the 32 Street and 67 Street interchanges and replaces two Red Deer River bridges originally built in the 1960s; construction is anticipated to run through 2031.

South of Airdrie, reconstruction of an existing interchange at Highway 566 is proposed, and new interchanges have been planned at Township Roads 264 and 265 to support future development in the area. Widening of the highway from four to six lanes between Highway 42 and Highway 597 is planned.

A functional planning study launched in 2026 is assessing a proposed bypass that would connect the northeast corner of Stoney Trail east of Airdrie to Highway 2 near Carstairs. Approximately 125,000 vehicles per day use the Airdrie section, a volume expected to approach capacity within two to three decades. The study is scheduled for completion by the end of 2027; construction is not in the current three-year provincial program and remains subject to future funding approval.

Between Edmonton and Leduc, Alberta Transportation has drafted plans to construct a dual freeway system in conjunction with a second ring road approximately 8 km (5 mi) beyond Anthony Henday Drive. The existing interchange at Highway 2A south of Leduc would be closed and reconstructed to modern standards further south. Between Edmonton and 41 Avenue SW, the highway would be realigned several hundred metres to the west to facilitate construction of a large interchange with the outer ring road. The existing bridges at Airport Road, Highway 19, 41 Avenue SW, and Ellerslie Road have all been constructed with sufficient width to allow for construction of two additional sets of lanes. In 2015, a planning study was completed outlining a new interchange at 65 Avenue in Leduc. In northwest Edmonton, a planned extension of Ray Gibbon Drive will bypass St. Albert from Anthony Henday Drive to Highway 2. Upon completion of this road, Ray Gibbon Drive would be designated as Highway 2. On June 1, 2020, work began on the first phase to twin Ray Gibbon Drive from 137 Avenue NW to just north of LeClair Way. An interchange at Cardiff Road is also planned, just south of Morinville.

North of Morinville, Highway 2 is a lightly travelled two lane highway carrying well under 10,000 vehicles per day, but in 2012 Alberta Transportation completed a study to plan for extension of twinning from Morinville to north of Highway 18 near Clyde. In 2013, a study was completed analyzing possible truck bypasses of Athabasca, to the east and west of the current alignment. A 2010 study assessed twinning of Highway 49 from Valleyview to Donnelly, and Highway 2 from Donnelly to south of Nampa.

== Major intersections ==
Rural/specialized municipality	Location	km	mi	Exit	Destinations	Notes
Cardston County	Carway	0.0	0.0		US 89 south – Browning, Great Falls	Continuation into Montana
Cardston County	Carway	0.0	0.0	Canada–United States border at Piegan–Carway Border Crossing		
Cardston County		5.4	3.4		PAR 136 west – Police Outpost Provincial Park	
Cardston County		20.7	12.9		Highway 501 south – Del Bonita, Milk River	South end of Highway 501 concurrency
Cardston		21.3	13.2		Cardston Truck Bypass (Highway 501 north)	Official part of Highway 501 (unsigned)
Cardston		23.5	14.6		Highway 501 west (9th Avenue)	North end of Highway 501 concurrency
Cardston		25.0	15.5		Highway 5 west / Cardston Truck Bypass (Highway 501 south) – Waterton Park	South end of Highway 5 concurrency
Blood 148		25.8	16.0		Highway 5 east – Magrath, Lethbridge	North end of Highway 5 concurrency
Blood 148		41.4	25.7		Highway 505 west – Glenwood	South end of Highway 505 concurrency
Blood 148		44.8	27.8		Highway 505 east – Spring Coulee	North end of Highway 505 concurrency
Blood 148	Stand Off	55.0	34.2		Highway 509 east – Coalhurst	
Cardston County	No major junctions					
M.D. of Willow Creek No. 26		75.2	46.7		Highway 511 east	
Fort Macleod		84.4	52.4		Highway 3 east (Crowsnest Highway) – Lethbridge	South end of Highway 3 concurrency; south end of CANAMEX Corridor
Fort Macleod		85.7	53.3		Highway 811 north (6th Avenue)	
M.D. of Willow Creek No. 26		89.5	55.6	89	Highway 3 west (Crowsnest Highway) – Pincher Creek, Crowsnest Pass	North end of Highway 3 concurrency
M.D. of Willow Creek No. 26		90.4	56.2	Crosses Oldman River		
M.D. of Willow Creek No. 26		91.5	56.9		Highway 785 west – Head-Smashed-In Buffalo Jump	
M.D. of Willow Creek No. 26	Granum	109.2	67.9		Highway 519 east – Nobleford, Picture Butte	
M.D. of Willow Creek No. 26	Claresholm	126.0	78.3		Highway 520 – Barons	
M.D. of Willow Creek No. 26	Stavely	143.0	88.9		Highway 527 west	
M.D. of Willow Creek No. 26		149.5	92.9		Highway 529 east – Champion	
M.D. of Willow Creek No. 26	Nanton	165.5	102.8		Highway 533 west – Chain Lakes	South end of Highway 533 concurrency
M.D. of Willow Creek No. 26	Nanton	166.9	103.7		Highway 533 east (18 Street) – Vulcan	North end of Highway 533 concurrency
M.D. of Willow Creek No. 26–Foothills County line	Connemara	173.5	107.8		Township Road 170 / 722 Avenue	Former Highway 2A north
Foothills County		179.9	111.8		674 Avenue E – Cayley	
Foothills County		183.2	113.8		Highway 540 west – Bar U Ranch National Historic Site	
Foothills County	High River	192.9	119.9	194	Highway 23 (12 Avenue SE) – High River, Vulcan	Signed as exits 194A (east) and 194B (west)
Foothills County	High River	194.8	121.0	(195)	High River Business Park	Southbound exit only
Foothills County	High River	196.2	121.9	197	498 Avenue E	To Highway 543 west
Foothills County		201.4	125.1	202	Mazeppa, Gas Plant, Auction Mart	Southbound exit and northbound entrance
Foothills County	Aldersyde	208.3	129.4	209	Highway 7 west – Okotoks, Diamond Valley; To Highway 2A – Aldersyde, High River; Highway 547 east – Mossleigh	
Foothills County		214.4	133.2		338 Avenue	Interchange proposed (no construction timeline)
Foothills County		221.6	137.7	222	Highway 2A south / Highway 552 east – De Winton, Okotoks	South end of Highway 2A concurrency
Foothills County		223.6	138.9	225	Macleod Trail (Highway 2A north) to Highway 1 (TCH) west – City Centre	Northbound exit and southbound entrance; north end of Highway 2A concurrency; south end of Deerfoot Trail
Foothills County		225.9	140.4	227	Dunbow Road – Heritage Pointe, De Winton	
Foothills County–Calgary line		228.2	141.8	Crosses the Bow River		
City of Calgary		229.9	142.9	230	212 Avenue SE	
City of Calgary		231.4	143.8	232	Cranston Avenue / Seton Boulevard	To South Health Campus; no access from Stoney Trail
City of Calgary		231.9– 234.5	144.1– 145.7	234	Stoney Trail (Highway 201) – Medicine Hat, Edmonton	Signed as exits 234A (east) and 234B (west); Highway 201 exit 101; former Highway 22X
City of Calgary		231.9– 234.5	144.1– 145.7	234B	McKenzie Lake Boulevard / Cranston Boulevard	Southbound exit and northbound entrance
City of Calgary		233.6	145.2	236	McKenzie Towne Boulevard / McKenzie Lake Boulevard	
City of Calgary		237.2	147.4	238	130 Avenue SE	
City of Calgary		238.7	148.3	240	Barlow Trail north	
City of Calgary		240.4	149.4	241	24 Street SE / Douglasdale Boulevard	
City of Calgary		241.6	150.1	Ivor Strong Bridge across Bow River		
City of Calgary		241.7– 242.6	150.2– 150.7	243	Anderson Road / Bow Bottom Trail	
City of Calgary		243.7	151.4	245	Southland Drive	
City of Calgary		244.6	152.0	246	11 Street SE – Shopping Centre	Southbound exit and entrance
City of Calgary		245.5	152.5	247	Heritage Drive / Glenmore Trail west – Shopping Centre	Northbound exit and entrance
City of Calgary		246.7	153.3	248	Glenmore Trail	Southbound signed as exits 248A (east) and 248B (west); no northbound to westbound exit; former Highway 8 west
City of Calgary		249.0	154.7	Calf Robe Bridge across Bow River		
City of Calgary		250.3	155.5	251	Peigan Trail east / Barlow Trail south	
City of Calgary		253.0	157.2	254	17 Avenue SE east / Blackfoot Trail south	Former Highway 1A east
City of Calgary		254.6	158.2	256	Memorial Drive – City Centre	
City of Calgary		256.8	159.6	258	16 Avenue NE (Highway 1 (TCH)) – Banff, Medicine Hat	
City of Calgary		258.6	160.7	260	32 Avenue NE	
City of Calgary		260.3	161.7	261	McKnight Boulevard	Signed as exits 261A (east) and 261B (west)
City of Calgary		262.0	162.8	263	64 Avenue NE	
City of Calgary		263.7	163.9	265	Beddington Trail / 11 Street NE	Beddington Trail northbound exit and southbound entrance; 11 Street NE northbound exit and entrance
City of Calgary		265.6	165.0	266	96 Avenue NE / Airport Trail – Calgary International Airport	
City of Calgary		267.5	166.2	268	Country Hills Boulevard	
City of Calgary		262.2– 271.4	162.9– 168.6	271	Stoney Trail (Highway 201) – Banff, Medicine Hat, Lethbridge	Highway 201 exit 60; north end of Deerfoot Trail; south end of Queen Elizabeth II Highway
Rocky View County	Balzac	272.7	169.4	273	CrossIron Drive	Northbound exit and southbound entrance, access to CrossIron Mills
Rocky View County	Balzac	274.4	170.5	275	Highway 566 – Balzac, Kathyrn	
City of Airdrie		279.3	173.5	280	40 Avenue SW	Northbound exit and southbound entrance
City of Airdrie		280.9	174.5	282	Yankee Valley Boulevard	
City of Airdrie		282.2	175.4	(284)	East Lake Crescent	Northbound exit only
City of Airdrie		284.1	176.5	285	Highway 567 (Veterans Boulevard) – Airdrie, Irricana	
Rocky View County		293.8	182.6	295	Highway 2A north / Highway 72 east – Crossfield, Beiseker, Drumheller	
Rocky View County		303.9	188.8	305	Highway 2A – Crossfield, Carstairs, Acme	
Mountain View County		313.6	194.9	315	Highway 581 – Carstairs	
Mountain View County		325.0	201.9	326	Highway 582 – Didsbury	
Mountain View County	Olds	339.5	211.0	340	Highway 27 – Olds, Sundre, Three Hills	Signed as exits 340A (east) and 340B (west)
Red Deer County		352.2	218.8	353	Highway 2A south – Olds	Southbound exit only
Red Deer County	Bowden	355.5	220.9	357	Highway 587 – Bowden	
Red Deer County	Innisfail	364.0	226.2	365	Highway 54 west – Innisfail, Caroline	
Red Deer County	Innisfail	367.4	228.3	368	Highway 590 east (50 Street) – Innisfail, Big Valley	To Highway 2A north
Red Deer County		383.1	238.0	384	Highway 42 – Penhold, Pine Lake	
Red Deer County	Gasoline Alley	389.7	242.1	391	McKenzie Road	
Red Deer County	Gasoline Alley	390.7	242.8	392	Gasoline Alley East / Willow Street – Petrolia Industrial Park	Northbound exit only
Red Deer County	Gasoline Alley	391.2	243.1	393	Leva Avenue – Gasoline Alley	Southbound exit only
City of Red Deer		392.7	244.0	394	Gaetz Avenue (Highway 2A north) – City Centre	Northbound exit and southbound entrance
City of Red Deer		393.4	244.4	395	Taylor Drive (Highway 2A south) / 19 Street (Highway 595 east) – Penhold, Delburne	Southbound signed as exits 395A (north) and 395B (south)
City of Red Deer		395.6	245.8	397	32 Street	To Red Deer Polytechnic; becomes C&E Trail west of Highway 2
City of Red Deer		398.2	247.4	Crosses Red Deer River		
City of Red Deer		400.4	248.8	401	Highway 11 (67 Street) – Stettler, Sylvan Lake, Rocky Mountain House	
City of Red Deer		403.8	250.9	405	Highway 11A – Red Deer, Sylvan Lake	Northbound signed as exit 405A, southbound signed as exit 405B
Red Deer County	No major junctions					
Red Deer–Lacombe county line		408.7	254.0	Crosses Blindman River		
Lacombe County	Blackfalds	410.8	255.3	412	Highway 597 east / Aspelund Road – Blackfalds, Joffre	
Lacombe County	Lacombe	421.3	261.8	422	Highway 12 – Gull Lake, Bentley, Lacombe, Stettler	
Lacombe County		430.1	267.3	431	Highway 2A south / C&E Trail – Lacombe, Stettler	South end of Highway 2A concurrency
Lacombe County		435.8	270.8	437	Highway 2A north – Ponoka, Wetaskiwin	North end of Highway 2A concurrency
Lacombe–Ponoka county line		438.1	272.2	439	Highway 604 – Morningside	
Ponoka County		444.6	276.3	446	Matejka Road	
Ponoka County		445.8	277.0	447	Gee Road	Southbound exit and northbound entrance
Ponoka County		446.8	277.6	Crosses Battle River		
Ponoka County	Ponoka	448.9	278.9	450	Highway 53 – Rimbey, Ponoka	Signed as exits 450A (east) and 450B (west)
Ponoka County		461.2	286.6	462	Menaik Road	
Ponoka County–County of Wetaskiwin No. 10 line		467.6	290.6	469	Highway 611 – Maskwacis	
County of Wetaskiwin No. 10		480.6	298.6	482	Highway 13 – Wetaskiwin, Camrose, Ma-Me-O Beach, Winfield	Signed as exits 482A (east) and 482B (west)
County of Wetaskiwin No. 10		487.3	302.8	488	Correction Line Road	
County of Wetaskiwin No. 10		495.8	308.1	497	Highway 616 – Millet, Mulhurst	
Leduc County		507.1	315.1	508	Kavanagh, Glen Park District	
City of Leduc		514.4	319.6	516	Highway 2A south – Millet, Wetaskiwin	
City of Leduc		515.8	320.5	517	Highway 39 west (50 Avenue) – Leduc City Centre, Calmar, Drayton Valley	
City of Leduc		516.8	321.1	519	Leduc Business Sector	Northbound exit and entrance
City of Leduc		517.7	321.7	518	65 Avenue West	Southbound exit and entrance
City of Leduc		518.2	322.0	519	Leduc (50 Street, Airport Perimeter Road)	Southbound exit and northbound entrance
City of Leduc		519.7	322.9	521	Leduc Business Sector (Sparrow Crescent)	Northbound exit only
Leduc County	Nisku	521.0	323.7	522	Airport Road / 10th Avenue – Edmonton International Airport	
Leduc County	Nisku	524.4	325.8	525	Highway 19 west / Highway 625 east (20th Avenue) – Devon, Nisku, Beaumont	Truck bypass to Highway 16 west
City of Edmonton		531.2	330.1	532	41 Avenue SW	North end of Queen Elizabeth II Highway; south end of Calgary Trail (southbound) and Gateway Boulevard (northbound)
City of Edmonton		534.6	332.2	(535)	Ellerslie Road	No access to/from Anthony Henday Drive
City of Edmonton		534.7– 536.7	332.2– 333.5	(536)	Anthony Henday Drive (Highway 216) – Cold Lake, Fort McMurray, Jasper, Lloydminster	North end of CANAMEX Corridor; Highway 216 exit 78; northbound left exit
City of Edmonton		537.1	333.7	(537)	19 Avenue NW	No southbound entrance
City of Edmonton		537.9	334.2	(538)	23 Avenue NW	
City of Edmonton		539.4	335.2		34 Avenue NW	
City of Edmonton		540.9	336.1	—	Whitemud Drive east to Highway 14 east Gateway Boulevard north – City Centre	Highway 2 follows Whitemud Drive
City of Edmonton		541.7	336.6	—	106 Street	
City of Edmonton		542.6	337.2	—	111 Street	
City of Edmonton		544.2	338.2	—	119 Street / 122 Street	
City of Edmonton		545.1	338.7	Rainbow Valley Bridge across Whitemud Creek		
City of Edmonton		546.1	339.3	—	Terwillegar Drive	Left exit
City of Edmonton		547.0	339.9	—	53 Avenue	No access to/from Terwillegar Drive
City of Edmonton		548.6	340.9	—	Fox Drive	
City of Edmonton		548.9	341.1	Quesnell Bridge across North Saskatchewan River		
City of Edmonton		550.1	341.8	—	149 Street	No eastbound exit
City of Edmonton		551.3	342.6	—	159 Street	
City of Edmonton		552.5	343.3	—	170 Street – West Edmonton Mall	
City of Edmonton		553.5	343.9	—	178 Street – West Edmonton Mall	
City of Edmonton		555.4	345.1	—	Anthony Henday Drive (Highway 216) Whitemud Drive west	Highway 216 exit 18; Whitemud Drive continues to Highway 628
City of Edmonton		Gap in route				
City of Edmonton		569.4	353.8		Yellowhead Trail (Highway 16 (TCH/YH)) – Lloydminster, Jasper St. Albert Trail south	Highway 16 exit 381; Highway 2 follows St. Albert Trail
City of Edmonton		571.7	355.2		137 Avenue	South end of Mark Messier Trail
City of Edmonton		574.4	356.9		Anthony Henday Drive (Highway 216)	Highway 216 exit 31; north end of Mark Messier Trail
City of St. Albert		575.1	357.4		Gervais Road / Hebert Road	
City of St. Albert		577.1	358.6		Crosses Sturgeon River	
City of St. Albert		579.5	360.1		Villeneuve Road / Erin Ridge Road	To Highway 633 west
Sturgeon County		586.1	364.2		Highway 37 – Fort Saskatchewan, Onoway	Interchange
Sturgeon County	Morinville	592.7	368.3		Cardiff Road	Interchange proposed (no construction timeline)
Sturgeon County	Morinville	596.1	370.4		Highway 642 (100 Avenue) – Morinville, Sandy Beach	Interchange
Sturgeon County		612.7	380.7		Highway 651 – Busby, Legal	
Westlock County		626.1	389.0		UAR 79 east – Vimy	
Westlock County		635.8	395.1		Highway 18 west to Highway 44 – Westlock, Barrhead, Slave Lake	South end of Highway 18 concurrency
Westlock County	Clyde	637.3	396.0		Highway 18 east – Thorhild	North end of Highway 18 concurrency
Westlock County		656.2	407.7		UAR 170 east – Tawatinaw	
Westlock County		664.6	413.0		Highway 661 – Dapp, Rochester	
Athabasca County		692.4	430.2		Highway 663 west / Township Road 650 east – Fawcett, Meanook	South end of Highway 663 concurrency
Athabasca County		695.1	431.9		Highway 663 east – Boyle	North end of Highway 663 concurrency
Athabasca County	Athabasca	708.9	440.5		Highway 55 east (50 Avenue) – Lac La Biche, Cold Lake; To Highway 813 – Calling Lake, Wabasca-Desmarais; To Highway 63 – Fort McMurray	Highway 2 follows 50 Avenue west; directional signage changes from north/south to east/west; east end of Northern Woods and Water Route
Athabasca County		722.9	449.2		Highway 812 west – Baptiste Lake	
M.D. of Lesser Slave River No. 124		781.1	485.4		Highway 44 south – Westlock, Edmonton	
M.D. of Lesser Slave River No. 124		784.3	487.3		Highway 2A north – Hondo, Smith	
M.D. of Lesser Slave River No. 124		787.5	489.3		Crosses Athabasca River	
M.D. of Lesser Slave River No. 124	Slave Lake	839.2	521.5		Highway 88 north (Bicentennial Highway) – Wabasca-Desmarais, Red Earth Creek, Fort Vermilion, High Level	
M.D. of Lesser Slave River No. 124		859.3	533.9		UAR 124 north – Widewater	
M.D. of Lesser Slave River No. 124		862.5	535.9		UAR 167 north – Canyon Creek	
Big Lakes County		881.9	548.0		Highway 33 south (Grizzly Trail) – Swan Hills	
Big Lakes County		886.9	551.1		UAR 125 north – Kinuso	
Big Lakes County		899.1	558.7		UAR 170 north – Faust	
Big Lakes County		921.4	572.5		UAR 166 north – Joussard	
Big Lakes County		939.6	583.8		Highway 750 north – Grouard, Red Earth Creek	
Big Lakes County		944.6	586.9		UAR 174 south – Enilda	
Big Lakes County	High Prairie	956.2	594.2		48 Street (Highway 749)	
Big Lakes County		970.9	603.3		Highway 2A west – Valleyview	
M.D. of Smoky River No. 130		991.9	616.3		Highway 679 – Winagami Lake Provincial Park	
M.D. of Smoky River No. 130	McLennan	1,005.7	624.9			
M.D. of Smoky River No. 130	Donnelly	1,018.6	632.9		UAR 136 north	
M.D. of Smoky River No. 130		1,020.2	633.9		Highway 49 – Valleyview, Edmonton, Falher, Rycroft	Directional signage changes from east/west to north/south; south end of Arctic Corridor
Northern Sunrise County	Nampa	1,055.8	656.0		Highway 683 west – Marie Reine	
Northern Sunrise County		1,074.6	667.7		Highway 688 north – St. Isidore	
Peace River		1,082.3	672.5		Highway 744 south (100 Street) – Town Centre, Girouxville	Interchange; directional signage changes from north/south to east/west
Peace River		1,082.7	672.8		98 Street – Town Centre	Interchange; eastbound exit and westbound entrance
Peace River		1,083.1– 1,083.6	673.0– 673.3		Peace River Bridge across Peace River	
Peace River		1,084.3	673.8		Highway 684 south (Shaftesbury Trail)	Interchange
Peace River		1,086.2	674.9		Highway 743 north (74 Street)	
M.D. of Peace No. 135		1,092.7	679.0		Peace River Airport	
M.D. of Peace No. 135		1,094.3	680.0		Highway 2A south (Roma Drive)	
M.D. of Peace No. 135		1,102.5	685.1		Highway 35 north (Mackenzie Highway) – Manning, High Level, Northwest Territories	Directional signage changes from east/west to north/south; north end of Arctic Corridor
M.D. of Peace No. 135		1,104.1	686.1		PAR 106 west – Queen Elizabeth Provincial Park	
M.D. of Peace No. 135	Grimshaw	1,107.1	687.9		Highway 2A east (55 Avenue)	Mile Zero of Mackenzie Highway
M.D. of Peace No. 135	Grimshaw	1,107.3	688.0		Highway 685 west (50 Avenue)	
M.D. of Peace No. 135		1,110.5	690.0		Highway 684 east	Directional signage changes from north/south to east/west
M.D. of Peace No. 135	Berwyn	1,119.4	695.6		UAR 238 north	
M.D. of Peace No. 135	Brownvale	1,129.3	701.7		Highway 737 north	
M.D. of Fairview No. 136	Whitelaw	1,143.1	710.3		Highway 735 north	
M.D. of Fairview No. 136	Bluesky	1,155.1	717.7		UAR 214 north	
M.D. of Fairview No. 136	Fairview	1,164.9	723.8		Highway 732 north (113 Street) Highway 64A west – Hines Creek, Fort St. John	Directional signage changes from east/west to north/south
M.D. of Fairview No. 136		1,176.6	731.1		Highway 64 north – Hines Creek, Fort St. John	
M.D. of Fairview No. 136	Dunvegan	1,190.2– 1,190.8	739.6– 739.9		Dunvegan Bridge across Peace River	
M.D. of Spirit River No. 133	Rycroft	1,210.7	752.3		Highway 49 (NWWR) – Donnelly, Spirit River, Dawson Creek	West end of Northern Woods and Water Route
Saddle Hills County		1,227.3	762.6		Highway 677 east	North end of Highway 677 concurrency
Saddle Hills County		1,228.9	763.6		Highway 677 west – Woking	South end of Highway 677 concurrency
County of Grande Prairie No. 1		1,256.2	780.6		Highway 59 west / Highway 674 east – La Glace, Teepee Creek	
County of Grande Prairie No. 1	Sexsmith	1,258.6	782.1		100 Avenue	Sexsmith north access
County of Grande Prairie No. 1	Sexsmith	1,259.4	782.6		95 Avenue	Sexsmith south access
County of Grande Prairie No. 1		1,263.1	784.9		Highway 672 west – Hythe	
County of Grande Prairie No. 1	Clairmont	1,272.9	790.9		Highway 43 – Edmonton, Beaverlodge	Interchange; former northern terminus; section part of Highway 43 from 1998-2019
City of Grande Prairie		1,275.3	792.4		Grande Prairie city limits	Northern terminus; becomes 100 Street
City of Grande Prairie		1,276.1	792.9		132 Avenue	To Highway 670 east
City of Grande Prairie		1,277.7	793.9		116 Avenue / 100 Street – City Centre	Former Highway 2 (pre-1998) / Highway 43 (1998-2019) follows 116 Avenue; later becomes 108 Street
City of Grande Prairie		1,280.7	795.8		108 Street (Highway 40 south) / 100 Avenue – City Centre, Grande Cache, Hinton	Former Highway 2 (pre-1998) / Highway 43 (1998-2019) follows 100 Avenue
City of Grande Prairie		1,291.5	802.5		Highway 43 – Edmonton, Dawson Creek, Alaska	Interchange proposed; future Highway 40X south (unbuilt); continues as Highway 43 west
1.000 mi = 1.609 km; 1.000 km = 0.621 mi: Closed/former; Concurrency terminus; Incomplete access; Route transition; Unopened; () - Exit not officially numbered

== See also ==
- Calgary and Edmonton Trail
- CANAMEX Corridor
- Pan-American Highway
- Transportation in Calgary
- Transportation in Edmonton
- Royal eponyms in Canada
