= Pickardville =

Picardville Picardville
- Hamlet
- Location of Picardville Picardville (Canada)
- Coordinates: 54°03′04″N 113°52′53″W
- Country: Canada
- Province: Alberta
- Region: Central Alberta
- Census division: 13
- Municipal district: Westlock County

Government
  - Type: Unincorporated
  - Governing body: Westlock County Council

Area (2021)
  - Land: 0.5 km^{2} (0.19 sq mi)

Population (2021)
  - Total: 303
  - Density: 606.5/km^{2} (1,571/sq mi)
- Time zone: UTC−06:00 (Alberta Time)
- Area codes: 780, 587, 825

Pickardville is a hamlet in central Alberta, Canada within Westlock County. It is located 2 kilometres (1.2 mi) west of Highway 44, approximately 62 kilometres (39 mi) northwest of Edmonton.

== Demographics ==
Population history of Pickardville
Year	Pop.	±%
1941	139	—
1951	158	+13.7%
1956	139	−12.0%
1961	140	+0.7%
1966	135	−3.6%
1971	130	−3.7%
1976	120	−7.7%
1981	190	+58.3%
1986	217	+14.2%
1991	176	−18.9%
1996	179	+1.7%
2001	191	+6.7%
2006	208	+8.9%
2011	220	+5.8%
2016	214	−2.7%
2021	303	+41.6%
Source: Statistics Canada

In the 2021 Census of Population conducted by Statistics Canada, Pickardville had a population of 303 living in 120 of its 131 total private dwellings, a change of 41.6% from its 2016 population of 214. With a land area of 0.5 km^{2} (0.19 sq mi), it had a population density of 606.0/km^{2} (1,569.5/sq mi) in 2021.

As a designated place in the 2016 Census of Population conducted by Statistics Canada, Pickardville had a population of 214 living in 86 of its 90 total private dwellings, a change of −2.7% from its 2011 population of 220. With a land area of 0.5 km^{2} (0.19 sq mi), it had a population density of 428.0/km^{2} (1,108.5/sq mi) in 2016.

== See also ==
- List of communities in Alberta
- List of designated places in Alberta
- List of hamlets in Alberta
