= Rossington (disambiguation) =

Rossington is a civil parish in the Metropolitan Borough of Doncaster in South Yorkshire, England.

Rossington may also refer to:

== People ==
- Adam Rossington (born 1993), English cricketer
- Gary Rossington (1951–2023), American musician and songwriter
- Jane Rossington (born 1943), British actress
- Norman Rossington (1928–1999), English actor

== Other uses ==
- Rossington, Alberta, Canada, unincorporated community
- Rossington railway station, in South Yorkshire, England

== See also ==
- Rossi (surname), an Italian surname
