= Pibroch (disambiguation) =

Pibroch is the classical art music of the Great Highland Bagpipe of Scotland.

Pibroch may also refer to:

- Pibroch (vessel), a clyde puffer currently moored in Ireland
- Pibroch, Alberta, a hamlet in Canada
