= Nestow =

- Hamlet
- Location of Nestow Nestow (Canada)
- Coordinates: 54°14′19″N 113°35′40″W
- Country: Canada
- Province: Alberta
- Region: Central Alberta
- Census division: 13
- Municipal district: Westlock County

Government
  - Type: Unincorporated
  - Governing body: Westlock County Council

Area (2021)
  - Land: 0.05 km^{2} (0.019 sq mi)

Population (2021)
  - Total: 5
  - Density: 97.1/km^{2} (251/sq mi)
- Time zone: UTC−06:00 (Alberta Time)
- Area codes: 780, 587, 825

Nestow is a hamlet in central Alberta, Canada within Westlock County. It is located on Highway 2, approximately 78 kilometres (48 mi) north of Edmonton.

== Demographics ==
Population history of Nestow
Year	Pop.	±%
1991A	15	—
1996	7	−53.3%
2001	10	+42.9%
2006	15	+50.0%
2011	10	−33.3%
2016	10	+0.0%
2021	5	−50.0%
Source: Statistics Canada

In the 2021 Census of Population conducted by Statistics Canada, Nestow had a population of 5 living in 4 of its 6 total private dwellings, a change of −50% from its 2016 population of 10. With a land area of 0.05 km^{2} (0.019 sq mi), it had a population density of 100.0/km^{2} (259.0/sq mi) in 2021.

As a designated place in the 2016 Census of Population conducted by Statistics Canada, Nestow had a population of 10 living in 5 of its 5 total private dwellings, a change of 0% from its 2011 population of 10. With a land area of 0.05 km^{2} (0.019 sq mi), it had a population density of 200.0/km^{2} (518.0/sq mi) in 2016.

== See also ==
- List of communities in Alberta
- List of designated places in Alberta
- List of hamlets in Alberta
