= Pibroch, Alberta =

Pibroch
- Hamlet
- Location of Pibroch Pibroch (Canada)
- Coordinates: 54°15′16″N 113°52′30″W
- Country: Canada
- Province: Alberta
- Region: Central Alberta
- Census division: 13
- Municipal district: Westlock County

Government
  - Type: Unincorporated
  - Governing body: Westlock County Council

Area (2021)
  - Land: 2.26 km^{2} (0.87 sq mi)

Population (2021)
  - Total: 35
  - Density: 15.5/km^{2} (40/sq mi)
- Time zone: UTC−06:00 (Alberta Time)
- Area codes: 780, 587, 825

Pibroch is a hamlet in central Alberta, Canada within Westlock County. It lies 2 kilometres (1.2 mi) west of Highway 44, approximately 83 kilometres (52 mi) northwest of Edmonton.

== Toponymy ==
Pibroch was named after the musical genre of the same name associated heavily with the bagpipes by early Scottish settlers. The name's selection may have been a tongue-in-cheek reference to sounds made by a local cat, which resembled the sound of bagpipes to some residents.

== History ==
=== Settlement and growth: 1906-129 ===
The hamlet was first settled by white homesteaders in 1906. Mail services were provided at a nearby settlement named Edison until May 1910, when a post office opened with the name Pibroch. The name was selected for approval by the Post Office Department out of three submissions, with the other names being Learig and Halltown. A log cabin was constructed in 1914 for use as a community centre, named Pibroch Farmers' Hall. Two years later, Pibroch School opened.

In 1920, Presbyterian ministers based in Westlock began travelling to Pibroch every Sunday to give sermons. The next year, the Edmonton, Dunvegan and British Columbia Railway established a stop in the area in 1921. This station initially operated under the name Debney, in honour of engineer Philip Debney, who had helped established the railway line. When the post office relocated closer to the railroad shortly afterwards, rail authorities changed the station's name to Pibroch.

The railway's introduction brought economic growth to Pibroch. Over the rest of the 1920s, outfits that began operating in Pibroch included three stores, as well as a blacksmith, butcher, café, and hotel.

A permanent community hall was built in 1923, and the log cabin was donated to the Presbyterian Church to serve as Pibroch's permanent place of worship. A Sunday school also operated out of the cabin until 1944.

=== Later development: 1940–1979 ===
As Pibroch's population continued to grow, its community hall received an extension in 1930. By 1945, the Pibroch Farmers' Association operated several committees tasked with fostering social events. One committee was responsible for maintaining a local ice rink; another was tasked with organizing picnics. In 1947, these committees consolidated into the Pibroch Community League. The League's first act was to purchase land south of Pibroch for conversion into a sports ground.

A Hutterite community, the Pibroch Hutterite Colony, began operating near the hamlet in 1952. At its height in the 2010s, the colony would have 170 members. The next year, construction began on a chapel for Pibroch's Presbyterian congregation. It began hosting services in 1961, but by this time, the number of parishioners in Pibroch had dwindled. Church services ended in 1970. (The original log cabin was donated to the Westlock and District Historical Society in 1963.)

The Pibroch Community League received a grant from the provincial government to enlarge its community centre for a second time in 1976. The Pibroch Hutterite Colony began rearing ostriches in the mid-1990s.

=== Hamlet: 1980–present ===
Pibroch was officially declared a hamlet in 1980; its post office closed in December of the next year. The Pibroch Hutterite Colony attracted media attention in the mid-1990s for rearing ostriches. In 2010, the hamlet's addressing was updated.

Westlock County Council heard in December 2024 that Pibroch was among the county's nine hamlets in need of upgrades to ageing infrastructure. Required road repairs and fireproofing would reportedly cost $40 million to complete.

== Amenities ==
=== Community centre ===
As of 2026 the Pibroch District and Agricultural Society (P&DAS), the modern incarnation of the Pibroch Community League, continues to operate Pibroch Community Hall.

=== Recreation ===
Pibroch's sports ground contains a baseball field. A campground also operates in the hamlet.

== Services ==
As of 2026 the Pembina Hills School Division provides education to students living on the Pibroch Hutterite Colony, focusing on teaching the English language.

== Demographics ==
Population history of Pibroch
Year	Pop.	±%
1941	84	—
1951	104	+23.8%
1956	140	+34.6%
1961	118	−15.7%
1966	141	+19.5%
1971	112	−20.6%
1976	88	−21.4%
1981	61	−30.7%
1986	87	+42.6%
1991	88	+1.1%
1991A	92	+4.5%
1996	71	−22.8%
2001	75	+5.6%
2006	83	+10.7%
2011	83	+0.0%
2016	47	−43.4%
2021	35	−25.5%
Source: Statistics Canada

As of 2026, Westlock County reports that Pibroch contains 40 unique residences.

In the 2021 Census of Population conducted by Statistics Canada, Pibroch had a population of 35 living in 16 of its 18 total private dwellings, a change of −25.5% from its 2016 population of 47. With a land area of 2.26 km^{2} (0.87 sq mi), it had a population density of 15.5/km^{2} (40.1/sq mi) in 2021.

As a designated place in the 2016 Census of Population conducted by Statistics Canada, Pibroch had a population of 47 living in 22 of its 24 total private dwellings, a change of −43.4% from its 2011 population of 83. With a land area of 2.26 km^{2} (0.87 sq mi), it had a population density of 20.8/km^{2} (53.9/sq mi) in 2016.

== See also ==
- List of communities in Alberta
- List of designated places in Alberta
- List of hamlets in Alberta
