= Jarvie, Alberta =

Jarvie
- Hamlet
- Location of Jarvie Jarvie (Canada)
- Coordinates: 54°27′17″N 113°59′13″W
- Country: Canada
- Province: Alberta
- Region: Central Alberta
- Census division: 13
- Municipal district: Westlock County

Government
  - Type: Unincorporated
  - Governing body: Westlock County Council

Area (2021)
  - Land: 0.48 km^{2} (0.19 sq mi)

Population (2021)
  - Total: 103
  - Density: 215.8/km^{2} (559/sq mi)
- Time zone: UTC−06:00 (Alberta Time)
- Area codes: 780, 587, 825

Jarvie is a hamlet in central Alberta, Canada within Westlock County. It is located 0.6 kilometres (0.37 mi) west of Highway 44, approximately 108 kilometres (67 mi) northwest of Edmonton. Jarvie is on the bank of the Pembina River, with the Canadian Northern Railway directly east to the townsite. In June 2020, the Jarvie General Store was destroyed by a fire, the store had been in operation for at least 110 years.

== History ==
The Jarvie Cemetery was established in 1929.

The Jarvie Community Council was formed in 1943, however it later was incorporated as a society on August 21, 1946.

== Demographics ==
Population history of Jarvie
Year	Pop.	±%
1941	133	—
1951	132	−0.8%
1956	148	+12.1%
1961	147	−0.7%
1966	114	−22.4%
1971	104	−8.8%
1976	75	−27.9%
1981	74	−1.3%
1986	93	+25.7%
1991	98	+5.4%
1991A	100	+2.0%
1996	105	+5.0%
2001	112	+6.7%
2006	114	+1.8%
2011	113	−0.9%
2016	87	−23.0%
2021	103	+18.4%
Source: Statistics Canada

In the 2021 Census of Population conducted by Statistics Canada, Jarvie had a population of 103 living in 50 of its 54 total private dwellings, a change of 18.4% from its 2016 population of 87. With a land area of 0.48 km^{2} (0.19 sq mi), it had a population density of 214.6/km^{2} (555.8/sq mi) in 2021.

As a designated place in the 2016 Census of Population conducted by Statistics Canada, Jarvie had a population of 87 living in 48 of its 55 total private dwellings, a change of −23% from its 2011 population of 113. With a land area of 0.48 km^{2} (0.19 sq mi), it had a population density of 181.3/km^{2} (469.4/sq mi) in 2016.

== Monuments and attractions ==
- Jarvie Cenotaph - A WW2 memorial which was erected in autumn of 1979 or early 1980s in remembrance of 4 local former citizens of the hamlet that had perished during the war.

== See also ==
- List of communities in Alberta
- List of designated places in Alberta
- List of hamlets in Alberta
