= Pembina Hills Regional Division No. 7 =

School division

Coordinates: 54°7′24″N 114°24′8″W

Pembina Hills School Division

Location
- 5310 49 Street; Barrhead, Alberta, Canada; T7N 1P3 Woodlands County, County of Barrhead No. 11, Westlock County, SE portions of Big Lakes County, S portions of the M.D. of Lesser Slave River No. 124, and all towns and villages within those municipal districts. Canada

District information
- Superintendent: Raime Drake
- Chair of the board: Judy Lefebvre
- Schools: 16
- Budget: CA$58.9 million (2020-2021)

Students and staff
- Students: 3,500

Other information
- Elected trustees: Nolan Mast, East-Ward 1; Nicholas McCann, East-Ward 2; David Truckey, East-Ward 3 (Vice Chair); Victoria Kane, West-Ward 1 (Chair); Cindy Carswell, West-Ward 2; Judy Lefebvre, West-Ward 3 (Board Chair)
- Website: www.pembinahills.ca

The Pembina Hills School Division (formerly known as Pembina Hills Regional Division No. 7 and Pembina Hills Public Schools) is a school division headquartered in Barrhead, Alberta.

The division, with 16 schools having a total of about 3,700 students as of 2021, provides public education to the following central Alberta communities: the towns of Barrhead, Swan Hills, and Westlock, and the Village of Clyde, as well as the counties of Barrhead, Westlock, and Woodlands County. Sections of Big Lakes County and Municipal District of Lesser Slave River No. 124 to the southeast and south are also in this school district.

== History ==
The division was created on January 1, 1995 from the County of Barrhead No. 11 school district, Swan Hills School District No. 5109, and Westlock School Division No. 37, which combined into a single school district.

It was established during a wave of school board amalgamations in Alberta, during the Progressive Conservative government of Ralph Klein. Pembina Hills School Division was the result of a voluntary merger of Westlock School Division No. 37, the educational component of the County of Barrhead No. 11 and Swan Hills School District No. 5109.

Prior to that union, the Barrhead and Westlock areas had previously been part of a regional school division, Pembina School Division No. 37, which was split in 1947 into the Westlock and Barrhead School Divisions. In 1959, the Municipal District of Barrhead consolidated with the school district to form a county. The first school district in Swan Hills (Oil Hills School District No. 5109) was not formed until 1959.

== Schools ==
- Barrhead Composite High School, Barrhead, Grades 7-12
- Barrhead Outreach, Barrhead, Grades 10-12
- Busby School, Busby, Kindergarten-Grade 6
- Dunstable School, rural County of Barrhead near Busby, Kindergarten-Grade 6
- Early Learning Services, Barrhead
- École Barrhead Elementary School, Barrhead, Kindergarten-Grade 6 (French Immersion)
- École Westlock Elementary School, Westlock, Kindergarten-Grade 6 (French Immersion)
- Eleanor Hall School, Clyde, Kindergarten-Grade 9
- Fort Assiniboine School, Fort Assiniboine, Kindergarten-Grade 9
- Neerlandia Public Christian School, Neerlandia, Kindergarten-Grade 9
- Pembina North Community School, Dapp, Kindergarten-Grade 9
- Pibroch Colony School, Dapp, Kingergarten-Grade 9
- R.F. Staples Secondary School, Westlock, Grades 7-12
- Sunny Bend Colony School, Westlock, Grades 1-9
- Swan Hills School, Swan Hills, Kindergarten-Grade 12
- Vista Virtual School, Virtual School (office in Calgary), Grades 2-12
- Westlock Outreach School, Westlock, Grades 10-12
