= Vimy, Alberta =

Vimy
- Hamlet
- Location of Vimy Vimy (Canada)
- Coordinates: 54.063°N 113.647°W
- Country: Canada
- Province: Alberta
- Region: Central Alberta
- Census division: 13
- Municipal district: Westlock County

Government
  - Type: Unincorporated
  - Governing body: Westlock County Council

Area (2021)
  - Land: 0.53 km^{2} (0.20 sq mi)

Population (2021)
  - Total: 183
  - Density: 348.2/km^{2} (902/sq mi)
- Time zone: UTC−06:00 (Alberta Time)
- Area codes: 780, 587, 825

Vimy is a hamlet in Westlock County in Central Alberta, Canada. It is located 1.4 kilometres (0.87 mi) east of Highway 2, approximately 59 kilometres (37 mi) north of Edmonton.

== Demographics ==
Population history of Vimy
Year	Pop.	±%
1941	136	—
1951	119	−12.5%
1956	116	−2.5%
1961	127	+9.5%
1966	117	−7.9%
1971	115	−1.7%
1976	116	+0.9%
1981	129	+11.2%
1986	186	+44.2%
1991	196	+5.4%
1991A	199	+1.5%
1996	188	−5.5%
2001	177	−5.9%
2006	187	+5.6%
2011	205	+9.6%
2016	198	−3.4%
2021	183	−7.6%
Source: Statistics Canada

In the 2021 Census of Population conducted by Statistics Canada, Vimy had a population of 183 living in 80 of its 93 total private dwellings, a change of −7.6% from its 2016 population of 198. With a land area of 0.53 km^{2} (0.20 sq mi), it had a population density of 345.3/km^{2} (894.3/sq mi) in 2021.

As a designated place in the 2016 Census of Population conducted by Statistics Canada, Vimy had a population of 198 living in 91 of its 106 total private dwellings, a change of −3.4% from its 2011 population of 205. With a land area of 0.53 km^{2} (0.20 sq mi), it had a population density of 373.6/km^{2} (967.6/sq mi) in 2016.

== See also ==
- List of communities in Alberta
- List of designated places in Alberta
- List of hamlets in Alberta
