= Tawatinaw =

- Hamlet
- Location of Tawatinaw Tawatinaw (Canada)
- Coordinates: 54°17′53″N 113°29′00″W
- Country: Canada
- Province: Alberta
- Region: Central Alberta
- Census division: 13
- Municipal district: Westlock County

Government
  - Type: Unincorporated
  - Governing body: Westlock County Council

Area (2021)
  - Land: 0.13 km^{2} (0.050 sq mi)

Population (2021)
  - Total: 15
  - Density: 118.6/km^{2} (307/sq mi)
- Time zone: UTC−06:00 (Alberta Time)
- Area codes: 780, 587, 825

Tawatinaw (/təˈwɑːtɪnɑː/) is a hamlet in Alberta, Canada within Westlock County. It is located on Township Road 614, 2 kilometres (1.2 mi) east of Highway 2 and approximately 70 kilometres (43 mi) north of the City of Edmonton.

== Demographics ==
In the 2021 Census of Population conducted by Statistics Canada, Tawatinaw had a population of 15 living in 6 of its 7 total private dwellings, a change of 200% from its 2016 population of 5. With a land area of 0.13 km^{2} (0.050 sq mi), it had a population density of 115.4/km^{2} (298.8/sq mi) in 2021.

As a designated place in the 2016 Census of Population conducted by Statistics Canada, Tawatinaw had a population of 5 living in 3 of its 3 total private dwellings, a change of −50% from its 2011 population of 10. With a land area of 0.13 km^{2} (0.050 sq mi), it had a population density of 38.5/km^{2} (99.6/sq mi) in 2016.

== Amenities ==
Tawatinaw Valley Alpine and Nordic Centre is a local destination for downhill and cross-country skiing. Spread over 140 acres, there are over 20 km of cross-country ski trails with views of the Tawatinaw Valley and Landing Trail.

Pine Valley Resort is located in the hamlet and offers a gymnastics centre and is destination for the surrounding rural communities in Northern Alberta. Pine Valley Resort also has a large hall that is often used for social gatherings and has accommodations on site.

== See also ==
- List of communities in Alberta
- List of designated places in Alberta
- List of hamlets in Alberta
