= Rossington, Alberta =

Locality in Alberta, Canada

Coordinates: 54°10′01″N 114°05′09″W

Location of Rossington, Alberta

Rossington is an unincorporated locality in the Canadian province of Alberta, located in Westlock County. The community is situated 2 kilometres (1.2 mi) north of Highway 18, 67 kilometres (42 mi) northwest of St. Albert.
