= Rochester, Alberta =

Rochester
- Hamlet
- Location of Rochester in Alberta
- Coordinates: 54°22′21″N 113°27′38″W
- Country: Canada
- Province: Alberta
- Region: Northern Alberta
- Census division: 13
- Municipal district: Athabasca County

Government
  - Reeve: Doris Splane
  - Governing body: Athabasca County Council: Larry Armfelt; Christine Bilsky; Warren Griffin; Kevin Haines; Travais Johnson; Dwayne Rawson; Doris Splane; Penny Stewart; Denis Willcott

Area (2021)
  - Land: 3.17 km^{2} (1.22 sq mi)

Population (2021)
  - Total: 72
  - Density: 22.7/km^{2} (59/sq mi)
- Time zone: UTC−06:00 (Alberta Time)
- Website: www.athabascacounty.com

Rochester is a hamlet in northern Alberta, Canada within Athabasca County. It is 3 kilometres (1.9 mi) east of Highway 2, 93 kilometres (58 mi) north of Edmonton.

== Demographics ==
Population history of Rochester
| Year | Pop. | ±% |
|---|---|---|
| 1941 | 80 | — |
| 1951 | 103 | +28.8% |
| 1956 | 150 | +45.6% |
| 1961 | 83 | −44.7% |
| 1966 | 154 | +85.5% |
| 1971 | 111 | −27.9% |
| 1976 | 85 | −23.4% |
| 1981 | 87 | +2.4% |
| 1986 | 105 | +20.7% |
| 1991 | 92 | −12.4% |
| 1991A | 89 | −3.3% |
| 1996 | 107 | +20.2% |
| 2001 | 116 | +8.4% |
| 2006 | 107 | −7.8% |
| 2011 | 101 | −5.6% |
| 2016 | 79 | −21.8% |
| 2021 | 72 | −8.9% |
Source: Statistics Canada

In the 2021 Census of Population conducted by Statistics Canada, Rochester had a population of 72 living in 42 of its 59 total private dwellings, a change of −8.9% from its 2016 population of 79. With a land area of 3.17 km^{2} (1.22 sq mi), it had a population density of 22.7/km^{2} (58.8/sq mi) in 2021.

As a designated place in the 2016 Census of Population conducted by Statistics Canada, Rochester had a population of 79 living in 38 of its 45 total private dwellings, a change of −21.8% from its 2011 population of 101. With a land area of 2.44 km^{2} (0.94 sq mi), it had a population density of 32.4/km^{2} (83.9/sq mi) in 2016.

== See also ==
- List of communities in Alberta
- List of designated places in Alberta
- List of hamlets in Alberta
