= Unsigned =

Unsigned can refer to:

- An unsigned artist is a musical artist or group not attached or signed to a record label
  - Unsigned Music Awards, ceremony noting achievements of unsigned artists
- Similarly, the contractual condition of any personnel, property(ies) or domains
- In computing, a signedness of a numerical data type which proscribes negative values
- Unsigned highway, a road which has been assigned a number but whose number is not posted on signs or is posted on signs not intended for navigation
