= Hondo, Alberta =

Unincorporated community in northern Alberta

Hondo
- Unincorporated place
- Interactive map of Hondo
- Coordinates: 55°4′7″N 114°2′24″W
- Country: Canada
- Province: Alberta
- Municipal District: Lesser Slave River No. 124

Hondo is an unincorporated community in northern Alberta within the Municipal District of Lesser Slave River No. 124, located 2 kilometres (1.2 mi) east of Highway 2, 173 kilometres (107 mi) northwest of Edmonton.
