= Fawcett, Alberta =

Fawcett
- Hamlet
- Location of Fawcett Fawcett (Westlock County)
- Coordinates: 54°32′26″N 114°05′41″W
- Country: Canada
- Province: Alberta
- Region: Central Alberta
- Census division: 13
- Municipal district: Westlock County

Government
  - Type: Unincorporated
  - Governing body: Westlock County Council

Area (2021)
  - Land: 0.46 km^{2} (0.18 sq mi)

Population (2021)
  - Total: 60
  - Density: 130/km^{2} (340/sq mi)
- Time zone: UTC−06:00 (Alberta Time)
- Area codes: 780, 587, 825

Fawcett is a hamlet in central Alberta, Canada within Westlock County. It is located on Highway 44, approximately 118 kilometres (73 mi) northwest of Edmonton, and four kilometres east of Hubert Lake Wildland Provincial Park.

The community has the name of a railroad officer.

== Demographics ==
Population history of Fawcett
Year	Pop.	±%
1941	21	—
1951	146	+595.2%
1956	179	+22.6%
1961	179	+0.0%
1966	202	+12.8%
1971	141	−30.2%
1976	129	−8.5%
1981	88	−31.8%
1986	123	+39.8%
1991	122	−0.8%
1996	118	−3.3%
2001	102	−13.6%
2006	79	−22.5%
2011	73	−7.6%
2016	69	−5.5%
2016R	82	+18.8%
2021	60	−26.8%
Source: Statistics Canada

In the 2021 Census of Population conducted by Statistics Canada, Fawcett had a population of 60 living in 31 of its 36 total private dwellings, a change of −26.8% from its 2016 population of 82. With a land area of 0.46 km^{2} (0.18 sq mi), it had a population density of 130.4/km^{2} (337.8/sq mi) in 2021.

As a designated place in the 2016 Census of Population conducted by Statistics Canada, Fawcett had a population of 69 living in 31 of its 37 total private dwellings, a change of −5.5% from its 2011 population of 73. With a land area of 0.45 km^{2} (0.17 sq mi), it had a population density of 153.3/km^{2} (397.1/sq mi) in 2016.

== Notable residents ==
Fawcett is the hometown of professional hockey player and actor Ross Smith. Ross portrayed the character Barclay Donaldson in the 1977 movie Slap Shot. Casey Fawcett, the previous World Record holder for most glasses held in a single hand, is also a resident of Fawcett.

== See also ==
- List of communities in Alberta
- List of designated places in Alberta
- List of hamlets in Alberta
