= Clyde, Alberta =

Clyde
- Village
- Village of Clyde
- Location in Alberta
- Coordinates: 54°09′07″N 113°38′20″W
- Country: Canada
- Province: Alberta
- Region: Northern Alberta
- Census division: 13
- Municipal district: Westlock County
- Incorporated
  - Village: January 28, 1914

Government
  - Mayor: Charis Logan Aguirre
  - Governing body: Clyde Village Council

Area (2021)
  - Land: 1.28 km^{2} (0.49 sq mi)
- Elevation: 650 m (2,130 ft)

Population (2021)
  - Total: 415
  - Density: 324.9/km^{2} (841/sq mi)
- Time zone: UTC−06:00 (Alberta Time)
- Postal code: T0G 0P0
- Highways: Highway 2 Highway 18
- Website: Official website

Clyde is a village in northern Alberta, Canada. It is located north of Edmonton and east of Westlock, near the junction of Highway 18 and Highway 2.

It was incorporated in 1914 and named after George D. Clyde, a local entrepreneur and the community's first postmaster.

== Demographics ==
In the 2021 Census of Population conducted by Statistics Canada, the Village of Clyde had a population of 415 living in 178 of its 197 total private dwellings, a change of −3.5% from its 2016 population of 430. With a land area of 1.28 km^{2} (0.49 sq mi), it had a population density of 324.2/km^{2} (839.7/sq mi) in 2021.

In the 2016 Census of Population conducted by Statistics Canada, the Village of Clyde recorded a population of 430 living in 179 of its 198 total private dwellings, a −14.5% change from its 2011 population of 503. With a land area of 1.31 km^{2} (0.51 sq mi), it had a population density of 328.2/km^{2} (850.1/sq mi) in 2016.

== Education ==
The village is within the Pembina Hills Public Schools, which formed in 1995 as a merger of three school districts.

== See also ==
- List of communities in Alberta
- List of villages in Alberta
