= Busby, Alberta =

Busby
- Hamlet
- Location within Westlock County Location within Alberta
- Coordinates: 53°56′53″N 113°53′28″W
- Country: Canada
- Province: Alberta
- Region: Central Alberta
- Municipal district: Westlock County
- Founded: 1915

Government
  - Type: Unincorporated

Area (2021)
  - Land: 0.67 km^{2} (0.26 sq mi)

Population (2021)
  - Total: 135
  - Density: 200.7/km^{2} (520/sq mi)
- Time zone: UTC−06:00 (Alberta Time)
- Postal code: T0G 1H0
- Area codes: 780, 587
- Highways: Highway 651

Busby is a small hamlet in central Alberta, Canada within Westlock County. It is located on Highway 651, approximately 52 kilometres (32 mi) northwest of Edmonton and 16 kilometres (9.9 mi) west of Highway 2.

== History ==
Busby was settled by Americans and was named Independence when the post office opened in 1903. In 1915, the Edmonton, Dunvegan and British Columbia Railway arrived and the hamlet's name was changed to Busby.

== Demographics ==
Population history of Busby
Year	Pop.	±%
1941	112	—
1951	145	+29.5%
1956	89	−38.6%
1961	85	−4.5%
1966	68	−20.0%
1971	65	−4.4%
1976	73	+12.3%
1981	77	+5.5%
1986	66	−14.3%
1991	68	+3.0%
1991A	68	+0.0%
1996	73	+7.4%
2001	83	+13.7%
2006	90	+8.4%
2011	98	+8.9%
2016	140	+42.9%
2021	135	−3.6%
Source: Statistics Canada

In the 2021 Census of Population conducted by Statistics Canada, Busby had a population of 135 living in 67 of its 69 total private dwellings, a change of −3.6% from its 2016 population of 140. With a land area of 0.67 km^{2} (0.26 sq mi), it had a population density of 201.5/km^{2} (521.9/sq mi) in 2021.

As a designated place in the 2016 Census of Population conducted by Statistics Canada, Busby had a population of 140 living in 64 of its 66 total private dwellings, a change of 42.9% from its 2011 population of 98. With a land area of 0.69 km^{2} (0.27 sq mi), it had a population density of 202.9/km^{2} (525.5/sq mi) in 2016.

== See also ==
- List of communities in Alberta
- List of designated places in Alberta
- List of hamlets in Alberta
