= Westlock =

- Town
- Town of Westlock
- Flag

- Location in Westlock County

- Location of Westlock in Alberta
- Coordinates: 54°09′08″N 113°51′04″W
- Country: Canada
- Province: Alberta
- Planning region: Upper Athabasca
- Municipal district: Westlock County
- Incorporated
  - Village: March 13, 1916
  - Town: January 7, 1947

Government
  - Mayor: Jon Kramer
  - Governing body: Westlock Town Council
  - MP: Arnold Viersen
  - MLA: Glenn van Dijken

Area (2021)
  - Land: 13.37 km^{2} (5.16 sq mi)
- Elevation: 648 m (2,126 ft)

Population (2021)
  - Total: 4,921
  - Density: 368/km^{2} (950/sq mi)
- Time zone: UTC−06:00 (Alberta Time)
- Forward sortation area: T7P
- Area code: +1-780
- Highways: 18, 44
- Website: westlock.ca

Westlock is a town in central Alberta, Canada. Founded in 1913, the town is primarily an agricultural, business, and government administration centre serving communities and rural areas within surrounding Westlock County.

== Geography ==
Westlock is located approximately 85 km (53 mi) north of Edmonton, Alberta's provincial capital and Canada's sixth largest census metropolitan area. Westlock sits at the junction of Highway 44 and Highway 18. It is surrounded by Westlock County within Census Division 13.

Westlock lies on the Alberta plain, one of the Great Plains. It lies just to the north of the continental divide between the Athabasca and North Saskatchewan river basins, and to the east of the Pembina River, a tributary of the Athabasca. The town is about 670 metres (2,200 ft) above mean sea level. Westlock sits within the humid continental climate zone, on the northern edge of the aspen parkland belt, a once heavily treed region that was cleared for agriculture at the turn of the 20th century. It is a relatively fertile region of dark soils. To the north lies the subarctic climate zone. The mean annual precipitation averaged from one meteorological station within the county measured 468 millimetres (mm), based on data from 1980 to 1990. The mean annual temperature averaged 1.9 °C, with the mean monthly temperature reaching a high of 16.8 °C in July, and dropping to a low of −11.4 °C in January.

== History ==
Prior to European settlement, the area around Westlock was inhabited by First Nations people, notably the Cree. Although the fur trade had been active in Alberta since 1754 when Anthony Henday explored the area, the Westlock district was not mentioned in writing until David Thompson came through in April 1799.

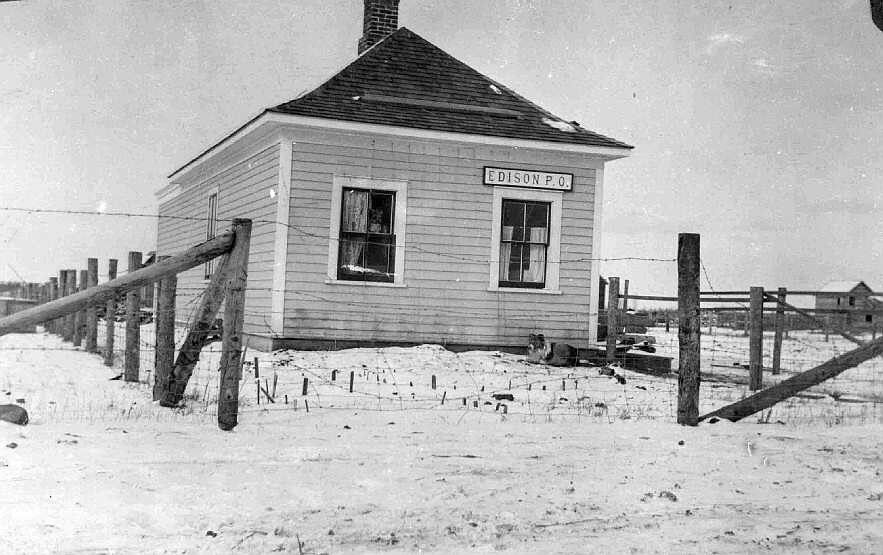
Post office in Edison, 1906

White settlement did not begin until 1902 at that time centred on a rural community about 5 km (3.1 mi) east of present-day Westlock. The founding family was named Edgson, but this was considered too hard to pronounce. Edson, Alberta already existed, so the site was called Edison by its Irish-Canadian founders, after the American inventor Thomas Edison. The community in 1912 consisted of a total of no more than 13 buildings: a harness shop, a blacksmith shop, several homes, two churches, and one family living in a tent. There was also a post office but this was closed in 1911 when Conservative Party came to power and fired many Liberals from the postal service. In 1911 the railway reached nearby Clyde to the east, and in 1912 the E.D. & B.C. Railway (later the Northern Alberta Railway, now part of CN) mapped a new townsite where Westlock now stands to the west. Edison was now caught between the two. In 1914, the Methodist church building was picked up and moved down the road to Westlock, an indication of the new settlement's ascendancy over the older one.

The name of the new town is a portmanteau of the names of William Westgate and William Lockhart, who owned the property. Westlock was incorporated as a village on 16 March 1916, with a population of 65 residents. The first reeve was George MacTavish, and in that same year, the first grain elevator was built. The first bank branch, the Merchant's Bank opened its doors in 1918. A permanent brick schoolhouse was built in 1925. The Sisters of Charity of Saint Vincent de Paul (Halifax) operated a hospital out of a former house in 1927, and a purpose-built hospital, the Immaculata, was opened in 1928. Westlock became a town on 7 January 1947 with a population of 854. That same year, the Memorial Hall was also built.

In 1992 the Memorial Hall burned down, later to be replaced. In 1995, the hospital was replaced by the Westlock Health Care Centre, a somewhat controversial decision because several other communities in Alberta were facing hospital closures at the time. In 1997, the old hospital was demolished.

On February 22, 2024, Westlock residents narrowly passed a popular initiative prohibiting the flying of flags related to "political, social, or religious movements or commercial entities" on municipal property, and the painting of zebra crossings in any colours other than white. The referendum was criticized by Mayor Jon Kramer, councilmen, and other politicians for prohibiting the official display of pride flags and the painting of rainbow crossings. Kramer stated the plebiscite was binding but did not reflect the views of all Westlock residents, and stated that "we will continue to find ways to embrace those in our community who need a helping hand, including marginalized groups."

== Demographics ==
Population history
| Year | Pop. | ±% |
|---|---|---|
| 1996 | 4,817 | — |
| 2001 | 4,819 | +0.0% |
| 2006 | 5,008 | +3.9% |
| 2011 | 4,823 | −3.7% |
| 2016 | 5,101 | +5.8% |
Source: Statistics Canada

In the 2021 Census of Population conducted by Statistics Canada, the Town of Westlock had a population of 4,921 living in 2,151 of its 2,385 total private dwellings, a change of −3.5% from its 2016 population of 5,101. With a land area of 13.37 km^{2} (5.16 sq mi), it had a population density of 368.1/km^{2} (953.3/sq mi) in 2021.

In the 2016 Census of Population conducted by Statistics Canada, the Town of Westlock recorded a population of 5,101 living in 2,142 of its 2,333 total private dwellings, a 5.8% change from its 2011 population of 4,823. With a land area of 13.37 km^{2} (5.16 sq mi), it had a population density of 381.5/km^{2} (988.1/sq mi) in 2016.

The population of the Town of Westlock according to its 2015 municipal census is 5,147, a 0% change from its 2008 municipal census population of 4,964.

NB The following sections present select demographic statistics arising out of the Canada 2006 Census. Population and dwelling unit figures presented within are rounded to the nearest multiple of 5 by Statistics Canada.

Dwelling characteristics

Westlock had 2,060 private dwellings occupied by usual residents in 2006. 74.8% of the occupied housing in the town was single-detached (the average in Alberta was 63.4%), while 17.7% were apartments in buildings with fewer than five storeys (14.7% in Alberta as a whole).

Of the total private dwellings, there were 1,410 housing units (houses or apartments) which were owned, and 650 which were rented. The majority of the housing stock (1,630) was constructed before 1986, while 430 units were built between 1986 and 2006. The average value of owned dwellings was $148,083 (compared to Albertan average of $293,811).

Families and households

There were 2,060 households, of which 1,355 were considered census families in 2006, with an average of 2.8 persons per family, compared to an Alberta average of 3.0. The median incomes in 2005 were $41,487 per household and $47,853 per census family, compared to the Alberta median incomes of $63,988 and $73,823 respectively.

Mother tongue

In 2006, there were 3,945 people who claimed English as their mother tongue, 125 who chose French, and 10 who indicated both. In addition, 600 claimed another language (besides English and French) as a mother tongue. Every person in town claimed at least a working knowledge of English, 4,450 said it was their only language, 220 said they also knew French, not one person was unilingually Francophone.

Immigration, citizenship, and generation

Of the population only 385 were immigrants, the majority of those (300) having arrived in Canada before 1991. All but 55 people were Canadian citizens. Most of the Canadian-born residents were from third generation or more (2,470), or the second generation (955).

Mobility status

The majority of the population (3,980) had lived in the same house a year earlier, and most of those (2,525) had been in the same house five years earlier as well.

Aboriginals and visible minorities

There were 310 people who had Aboriginal identity. There were 145 who reported being visible minorities.

Educational attainment

A large minority (1,385) of those residents aged 15 years and older (3,825) had no certificate, diploma, or degree. 1,100 of residents aged 15 years and older has a high school certificate or equivalent.

Occupation and industry

The total workforce was 2,155 people. The most common occupations were in sales and service (660) and trades, transport and equipment operation (410). The most common industries were other services (360), health care and social services (355), and retail trade (320).

Work location and transportation

Most people claimed to work in Westlock, and only (255) indicated working in another municipality. The majority (1,485) of those that had a regular workplace that was not their own home (1,950) commuted to work by private automobile.

Income

Of all persons in Westlock aged 15 years and older with income in 2005, 11.0% reported being below the low income cutoff before taxes. For those under the age of 18, the rate was 10.4% (compared to Alberta averages of 12.2% and 14.2% respectively).

== Economy ==
The area around Westlock is primarily agricultural, although there is some oil and gas activity. The main employers in town include the hotels and inns that cater to oilpatch workers, the farm implement dealerships, and some small manufacturing such as Wabash Mfg. Inc. - custom manufacturing, and a Lafarge cement plant. Additionally, Westlock still retains its original purpose as a centre for the grain trade, as CN still accepts grains from the remaining grain elevators, now owned by a new generation co-operative, Westlock Terminals (NGC) LTD. Also, Westlock is a centre of government as it is the location of Westlock County's municipal office and home of public and Catholic schools, a courthouse, a public library, and a modern hospital. As such, Westlock is the central town of the region where rural families do business, send their children to school, and obtain government services. Many rural people retire in the town, and there are several old age homes.

Westlock is too far from Edmonton to serve as a bedroom community but some people do commute. Of increasing importance to the community since the Second World War has been highway traffic heading to oilfields in Northern Alberta. Recent retail developments have shifted from the railway era downtown to larger malls and businesses along the highway. One recent proposal was for a residential development adjoining Westlock Airport which would allow people to commute to the oilsand projects in Fort McMurray and other northern developments, but this has not been started as yet.

== Government ==
Westlock's current MP is Arnold Viersen, representing the riding of Peace River-Westlock. In the 2015 Canadian Federal Election Westlock became part of the newly formed Peace River—Westlock federal electoral district. The MLA who represents Westlock is Glenn van Dijken. The town's current mayor is Jon Kramer who was elected in a by-election on January 10, 2024.

== Media ==
- Newspaper: Westlock News (originally Westlock Witness which began in 1919)
- FM Radio: Real Country 97.9 (FM 97.9, CKWB-FM) is owned by Stingray Radio and broadcasts a country format.

== Education ==
The town is within the Pembina Hills Public Schools, which formed in 1995 as a merger of three school districts.

== Notable people ==
- W.A.C. Bennett, former Premier of British Columbia
- Rollie Boutin, retired professional hockey player
- David Chatters, former MP
- Kyle Chipchura, professional hockey player
- Herbert Greenfield, former Premier of Alberta
- Carolyn Dawn Johnson, country music singer
- Greg Polis, retired professional hockey player
- Simeon Rottier, professional football player
- Colleen Soetaert, Canadian politician, former Liberal MLA
- Ron Tabak, original lead singer of the rock band Prism
- Claudette Tardif, former Deputy Leader of the Opposition in the Senate of Canada
- Dale C. Thomson, academic, author, advisor to the Prime Minister

== See also ==
- List of communities in Alberta
- List of towns in Alberta
