= Westlock County =

Municipal district in Alberta, Canada

- Municipal district
- Logo

- Major communities

- Location within Alberta
- Coordinates: 54°09′8″N 113°51′4″W
- Country: Canada
- Province: Alberta
- Region: Central Alberta
- Planning region: North Saskatchewan
- Established: 1943
- Incorporated: 1998

Government
  - Reeve: Don Savage (acting)
  - Governing body: Westlock County Council
  - Administrative office: Westlock

Area (2021)
  - Land: 3,169.66 km^{2} (1,223.81 sq mi)

Population (2021)
  - Total: 7,186
  - Density: 2.3/km^{2} (6.0/sq mi)
- Time zone: UTC−06:00 (Alberta Time)
- Website: westlockcounty.com

Westlock County is a municipal district in central Alberta, Canada that is north of Edmonton. The county was formerly known as the Municipal District of Westlock No. 92, and was created in 1943 from the merger of five smaller municipal districts.

== Geography ==
=== Physiography ===
The county lies on the boundary of two of Canada's largest drainage basins. The northern and western sectors of the county are drained by the Pembina River which flows north to meet the Athabasca River, which drains into the Arctic Ocean via the Mackenzie River. The southern and eastern sections drain into the Sturgeon River which joins the North Saskatchewan and eventually empties via the Nelson River into Hudson Bay.

A 1986 federal map shows the area as being the north-western edge of the Eastern Alberta Plains. Specifically, the county includes parts of the Edmonton Plain (and its subdivision Westlock Plain), as well as the Tawatinaw Plain, and is bounded on the northwest by the Athabasca Valley. The county also lies within the aspen parkland: a transitional biome between the boreal forest of Canada to the north and the prairie to the south.

=== Communities and localities ===
The following urban municipalities are surrounded by Westlock County.

Cities

- none

Towns

- Westlock

Villages

- Clyde

Summer villages

- Larkspur

The following hamlets are located within Westlock County.

Hamlets

- Busby
- Dapp
- Fawcett
- Jarvie
- Nestow
- Pibroch
- Pickardville
- Tawatinaw
- Vimy

The following localities are located within Westlock County.

Localities

- Analta
- Anton Lake
- Arvilla
- Deeney
- Eastburg
- Eunice
- Fawn Lake
- French Creek
- Halach
- Halcreek
- Halfway Lake
- Jeffrey
- Linaria
- Pembina Heights
- Regal Park
- Rossington
- Shoal Creek
- Sylvan Glen
- Waugh

== Demographics ==
In the 2021 Census of Population conducted by Statistics Canada, Westlock County had a population of 7,186 living in 2,680 of its 3,134 total private dwellings, a change of −0.5% from its 2016 population of 7,220. With a land area of 3,169.66 km^{2} (1,223.81 sq mi), it had a population density of 2.3/km^{2} (5.9/sq mi) in 2021.

In the 2016 Census of Population conducted by Statistics Canada, Westlock County had a population of 7,220 living in 2,670 of its 3,009 total private dwellings, a −5.5% change from its 2011 population of 7,644. With a land area of 3,171.83 km^{2} (1,224.65 sq mi), it had a population density of 2.3/km^{2} (5.9/sq mi) in 2016.

== Government ==
The municipal government consists of a reeve and six other elected councillors who work with a permanent staff of 32.

== Education ==
The county is within the Pembina Hills Public Schools, which formed in 1995 as a merger of three school districts.

== See also ==
- List of communities in Alberta
- List of francophone communities in Alberta
- List of municipal districts in Alberta
