= Marlboro Metis Settlement =

Marlboro
- Former Metis settlement
- Marlboro Metis Colony No. 6
- Boundaries of Marlboro

- Location within Yellowhead County

- Location within Alberta
- Coordinates: 53.6564449°N 116.7990526°W
- Country: Canada
- Province: Alberta
- Today part of: Yellowhead County
- Established: December 21, 1938
- Closed: 1941

Population (1940)
  - Total: 0

The Marlboro Metis Settlement is a former Metis settlement in Alberta, Canada, located within the boundaries of modern-day Yellowhead County. Established under the 1938 Metis Population Betterment Act as a relief measure for the province's impoverished Métis people, the heavily timbered Marlboro settlement was found to contain no land suitable for agricultural purposes. By 1941, representatives of the Métis withdrew their request to form a settlement in the area.

== History ==
The Great Depression saw much deprivation among the nomadic Métis population of Alberta, estimated at 11,000 in 1936. A royal commission was formed to investigate the living conditions of Alberta's "half-breeds" (as the Métis were known), who was then squatting on road allowances with no ready sources of cash income, or trapping in remote areas without access to education or health services. Métis children in urban areas were driven away from public schools by the ridicule and humiliation of white pupils, with an estimated 80% of the provincial Métis population receiving no education whatsoever.

This Ewing Commission saw agriculture, particularly stock-raising, as the means by which the Métis could be made into "self-supporting citizens". Farm colonies, in which the Métis themselves would provide most of the physical labor, would be a suitably inexpensive relief scheme for the cash-strapped Alberta government to implement.

Following these recommendations, the 1938 Metis Population Betterment Act enabled unoccupied Crown land to be set aside for the creation of new Métis settlements. Eleven were originally created by Order-in-Council through 1938 and 1939 – Wolf Lake, Utikuma Lake (now Gift Lake), Cold Lake, Marlboro, Keg River (now Paddle Prairie), Big Prairie (now Peavine), Touchwood, Goodfish Lake (now Kikino), Elizabeth, Fishing Lake, and East Prairie. Caslan (now Buffalo Lake) was the final addition, reserved for Métis veterans returning from World War II before being thrown open to general settlement in 1951.

The Marlboro Settlement was established 19 kilometres (12 mi) north of Marlboro, Alberta, a small community on the Canadian National Railway mainline. The area was estimated to contain some five to six hundred million feet of mature pine and spruce forest. With no land suitable for agricultural purposes, a 1941 report of the Alberta Bureau of Public Welfare recorded no settlers having taken residence in the area, and $49.51 spent on tentatively acquiring livestock was the only recorded expenditure ever taken by the province towards improving the Marlboro settlement. At this time, the Métis were reported to have withdrawn their request for a settlement in the district.

The Métis Nation of Alberta maintained a local organization in the Marlboro townsite for many decades after the withdrawal of the Marlboro Settlement. The Marlboro Local persisted until the 1980s, when it was disbanded by Russel Plante, its final president.

== Geography ==
The Marlboro settlement consisted of approximately five townships, bounded by the Athabasca River on its west side. A rugged and heavily forested region, no paved highway or populated place exists within these boundaries today.

=== Legal land description ===
The exact boundaries of the Marlboro settlement, as described in its enabling legislation, are as follows:

All of Townships 55 and 56, Range 20, west of the Fifth Meridian, in the Province of Alberta;

All of Township 55, Range 21, west of the Fifth Meridian, in the Province of Alberta;

All that portion of Township 55, Range 22, west of the Fifth Meridian in the Province of Alberta, east of the Athabasca River;

All that portion of Township 56, Ranges 21 and 22, west of the Fifth Meridian in the Province of Alberta, east of the Athabasca River;

All that portion of Township 57, Range 21, west of the Fifth Meridian in the Province of Alberta, east of the Athabasca River;

All that portion of Township 58, Range 21, west of the Fifth Meridian in the Province of Alberta, east of the Athabasca River.

— Alberta Order-in-Council 1603-38
