= Cold Lake Metis Settlement =

Cold Lake
- Former Metis settlement
- Cold Lake Metis Colony No. 9
- Boundaries of Cold Lake

- Location within M.D. of Bonnyville and I.D. 349
- Country: Canada
- Province: Alberta
- Today part of: M.D. of Bonnyville; I.D. 349
- Established: December 21, 1938

Population (1940)
  - Total: 0

The Cold Lake Metis Settlement is a former Métis settlement in Alberta, Canada, located within the boundaries of the modern-day Municipal District of Bonnyville No. 87. Established by the 1938 Metis Population Betterment Act as a relief measure for the province's impoverished Métis people, the rough and swampy Cold Lake settlement was found to be unsuitable for agricultural purposes. However, it was retained as a division of the Elizabeth and Fishing Lake settlements, which lacked the abundant fish and timber readily available at Cold Lake.

== History ==
The Great Depression of the 1930s saw much deprivation among the nomadic Métis population of Alberta, estimated at about 11,000 in 1936. A royal commission was formed to investigate the living conditions of Alberta's "half-breeds" (as the Métis were known), who were then squatting on road allowances with no ready sources of cash income, or trapping in remote areas without access to education or health services. Métis children in urban areas were driven away from public schools by the ridicule and humiliation of white pupils, with an estimated 80% of the provincial Métis population receiving no education whatsoever.

This Ewing Commission saw agriculture, particularly stock-raising, as the means by which the Métis could be made into "self-supporting citizens". Farm colonies, in which the Métis themselves would provide most of the physical labour, would be a suitably inexpensive relief scheme for the cash-strapped Alberta government to implement.

Following these recommendations, the 1938 Metis Population Betterment Act enabled unoccupied Crown land to be set aside for the creation of new Métis settlements. Eleven were originally created by Order-in-Council through 1938 and 1939 – Wolf Lake, Utikuma Lake (now Gift Lake), Cold Lake, Marlboro, Keg River (now Paddle Prairie), Big Prairie (now Peavine), Touchwood, Goodfish Lake (now Kikino), Elizabeth, Fishing Lake, and East Prairie. Caslan (now Buffalo Lake) was the final addition, reserved for Métis veterans returning from World War II before being thrown open to general settlement in 1951.

The Cold Lake Settlement was established 13 kilometres (8 mi) north of Cold Lake, adjoining Primrose Lake, with an additional 200-acre (81 ha) fishing station on the north shore of Cold Lake. With considerable areas of muskeg and stony ridges impeding agriculture, a 1941 report of the Alberta Bureau of Public Welfare recorded no settlers having taken residence in the area. However, merchantable timber and fish were both present in abundance, so the settlement was retained to provide resources for the nearby Elizabeth and Fishing Lake settlements.

Today, most of the inland portion of the former Cold Lake Settlement is occupied by the Cold Lake 149C Indian Reserve.

== Geography ==
The Cold Lake settlement consisted of two discontiguous parts: a rectangular half-township set back from the lakeshore proper, and a much smaller fishing station on Cold Lake itself.

=== Legal land description ===
The exact boundaries of the Cold Lake settlement, as described in its enabling legislation, are as follows:

The east half of Township 66, Range 1, west of the Fourth Meridian in the Province of Alberta;

All that portion of Section 14, Township 65, Range 1, west of the Fourth Meridian, in the Province of Alberta, not covered by the waters of Cold Lake, and not including the island at the mouth of the Matenau River—

— Alberta Order-in-Council 1605-38
