= Wolf Lake Metis Settlement =

Wolf Lake
- Former Metis settlement
- Wolf Lake Metis Colony No. 8A
- Boundaries of Wolf Lake

- Location within M.D. of Bonnyville, Lac La Biche County, and I.D. 349
- Country: Canada
- Province: Alberta
- Today part of: Municipal District of Bonnyville No. 87; Lac La Biche County
- Established: Dec. 21, 1938
- Expanded: Apr. 18, 1939
- Withdrawn: 1960

Population (1940)
  - Total: 58
- Website: Descendants' group

The Wolf Lake Metis Settlement is a former Métis settlement in Alberta, Canada, located within the boundaries of the modern-day Municipal District of Bonnyville No. 87 and Lac La Biche County. Established under the 1938 Metis Population Betterment Act as a relief measure for the province's impoverished Métis people, the wooded Wolf Lake settlement supported a population of 58 settlers in 1940. However, it was withdrawn in 1960, causing its Métis inhabitants to disperse.

== History ==
The Great Depression saw much deprivation among the nomadic Métis population of Alberta, estimated at about 11,000 in 1936. A royal commission was formed to investigate the living conditions of Alberta's "half-breeds" (as the Métis were known), who were then squatting on road allowances with no ready sources of cash income, or trapping in remote areas without access to education or health services. Métis children in urban areas were driven away from public schools by the ridicule and humiliation of white pupils, with an estimated 80% of the provincial Métis population receiving no education whatsoever.

This Ewing Commission saw agriculture, particularly stock-raising, as the means by which the Métis could be made into "self-supporting citizens". Farm colonies, in which the Métis themselves would provide most of the physical labour, would be a suitably inexpensive relief scheme for the cash-strapped Alberta government to implement.

Following these recommendations, the 1938 Metis Population Betterment Act enabled unoccupied Crown land to be set aside for the creation of new Métis settlements. Eleven were originally created by Order-in-Council through 1938 and 1939 - Wolf Lake, Utikuma Lake (now Gift Lake), Cold Lake, Marlboro, Keg River (now Paddle Prairie), Big Prairie (now Peavine), Touchwood, Goodfish Lake, Elizabeth, Fishing Lake, and East Prairie.

The Wolf Lake settlement was established thirty miles north of Bonnyville, including Wolf Lake and several smaller lakes. With commercially viable fish stocks, an abundance of timber, and connection to Bonnyville and Lac La Biche ensured by all-year wagon trail, only the agricultural suitability of the settlement was in doubt. Covered mostly in grey clay "not of a highly productive nature", Wolf Lake was estimated to have a modest carrying capacity of "not more than seventy or eighty families". A 1941 report of the Alberta Bureau of Public Welfare recorded a resident population of 58 inhabitants, with a lumbering operation active and a school under construction. Besides the cost of surveying the area, and $10 spent on seed, the colony had incurred no expense to the provincial government.

The Province withdrew the settlement in 1960, causing most of the settlers to disperse. But one Wolf Lake settler, Isadore Cardinal, refused to leave, living and trapping in the former settlement area until at least 1989. The Métis settlers' cemetery still exists at the site today.

Alberta Parks also operates a campground on the south shore of the lake.

== Geography ==
The Wolf Lake settlement consisted of approximately five townships, enclosing most of Wolf Lake and Seibert Lake.

=== Legal land description ===
The original boundaries of the Wolf Lake settlement, as described in its enabling legislation, are as follows:

All of Township 66 and the north half of Township 65, Range 7, west of the Fourth Meridian in the Province of Alberta;

All of Township 66 and the north half of Township 65, Range 8, west of the Fourth Meridian in the Province of Alberta;

— Alberta Order-in-Council 1604-38

A second Order-in-Council expanded these boundaries on April 18, 1939.

That all of the south half of Township 65, Range 7, west of the Fourth Meridian, excepting thereout all of Section 4 and the south-west quarter of Section 6 of the said Township, and reserving thereout the rights granted to W. O. Clark, of Cold Lake, under a Special Timber Permit, covering the south-west quarter of Section 1 of the said Township; and all of the south half of Township 65, Range 8, west of the Fourth Meridian, be set aside and withdrawn from disposal under the "Provincial Lands Act" for the use of duly qualified members of Colony No. 8A, Wolf Lake, and any such members entering upon the above described lands shall be entitled to Surface Rights only, until regulations governing the administration of the various colonies have been approved.

— Alberta Order-in-Council 448-39
