= 2012 Alberta municipal censuses =

- April 1–June 30, 2012
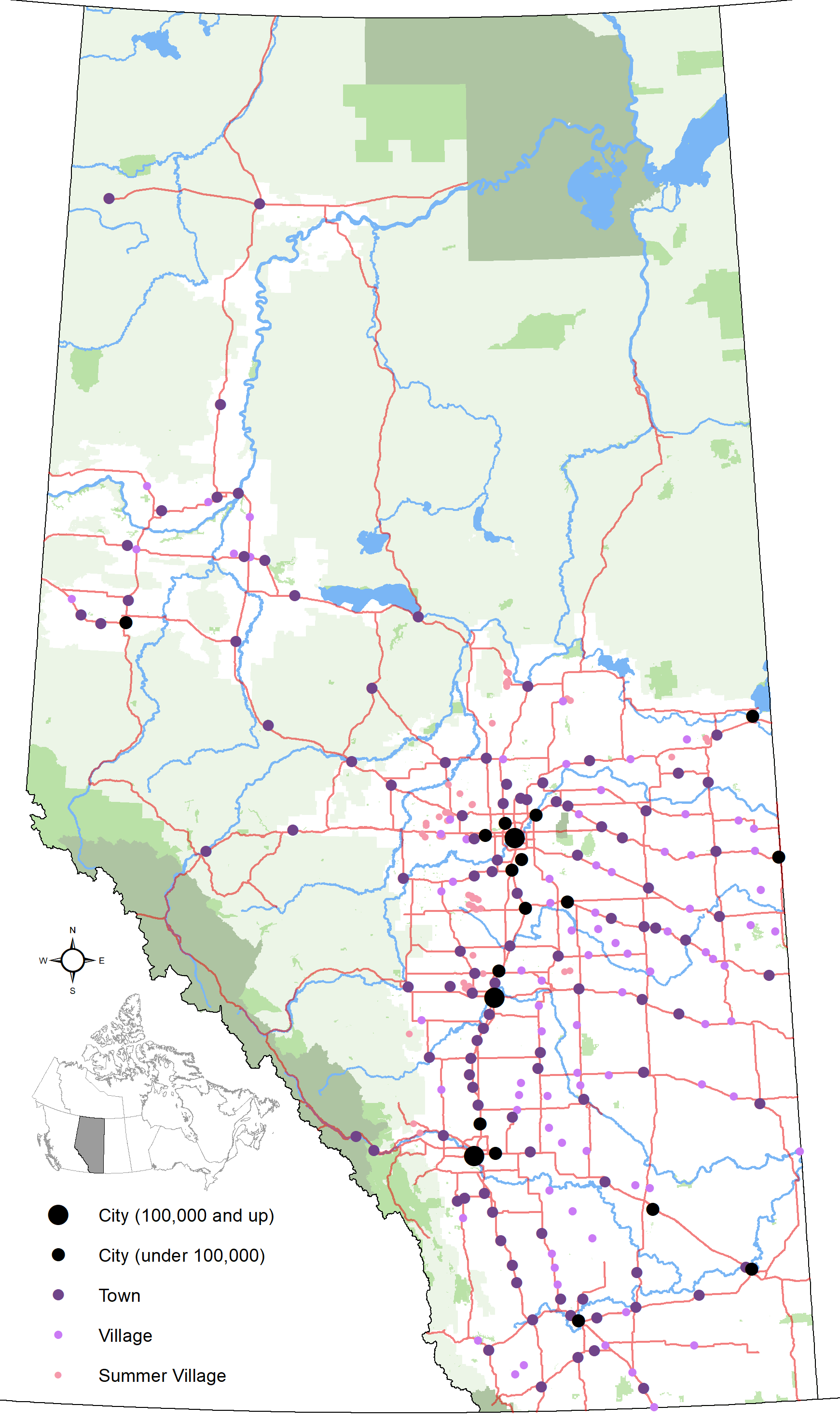
- Distribution of Alberta's 269 urban municipalities as of August 31, 2013

Alberta has provincial legislation allowing its municipalities to conduct municipal censuses between April 1 and June 30 inclusive. Municipalities choose to conduct their own censuses for multiple reasons such as to better inform municipal service planning and provision, to capitalize on per capita based grant funding from higher levels of government, or to simply update their populations since the last federal census.

Alberta had 359 municipalities between April 1 and June 30, 2012, (Note: By the end of 2013, the total number of municipalities dropped to 358 due to the dissolution of New Norway from village status to become a hamlet under the jurisdiction of Camrose County on November 1, 2012.) up from 358 during the same three-month period in 2011. (Note: Improvement District No. 349 was formed on January 1, 2012 through the separation of lands from the Regional Municipality of Wood Buffalo and Lac La Biche County.) At least 58 of these municipalities (16.2%) conducted a municipal census in 2012. Alberta Municipal Affairs recognized those conducted by 55 of these municipalities. By municipal status, it recognized those conducted by 8 of Alberta's 17 cities, 23 of 108 towns, 8 of 95 villages, 4 of 51 summer villages, 1 of 5 specialized municipalities, 3 of 64 municipal districts and all 8 Metis settlements. (Note: No censuses were conducted among Alberta's 3 special areas and 8 improvement districts.) In addition to those recognized by Municipal Affairs, censuses were conducted by the City of St. Albert, the Village of Beiseker and Strathcona County (a specialized municipality).

Some municipalities achieved population milestones as a result of their 2011 censuses. Calgary surpassed 1.1 million while the cities of Leduc and Fort Saskatchewan surpassed the 25,000 and the 20,000 marks respectively. Chestermere, Alberta's fourth-largest town, surpassed 15,000 residents.

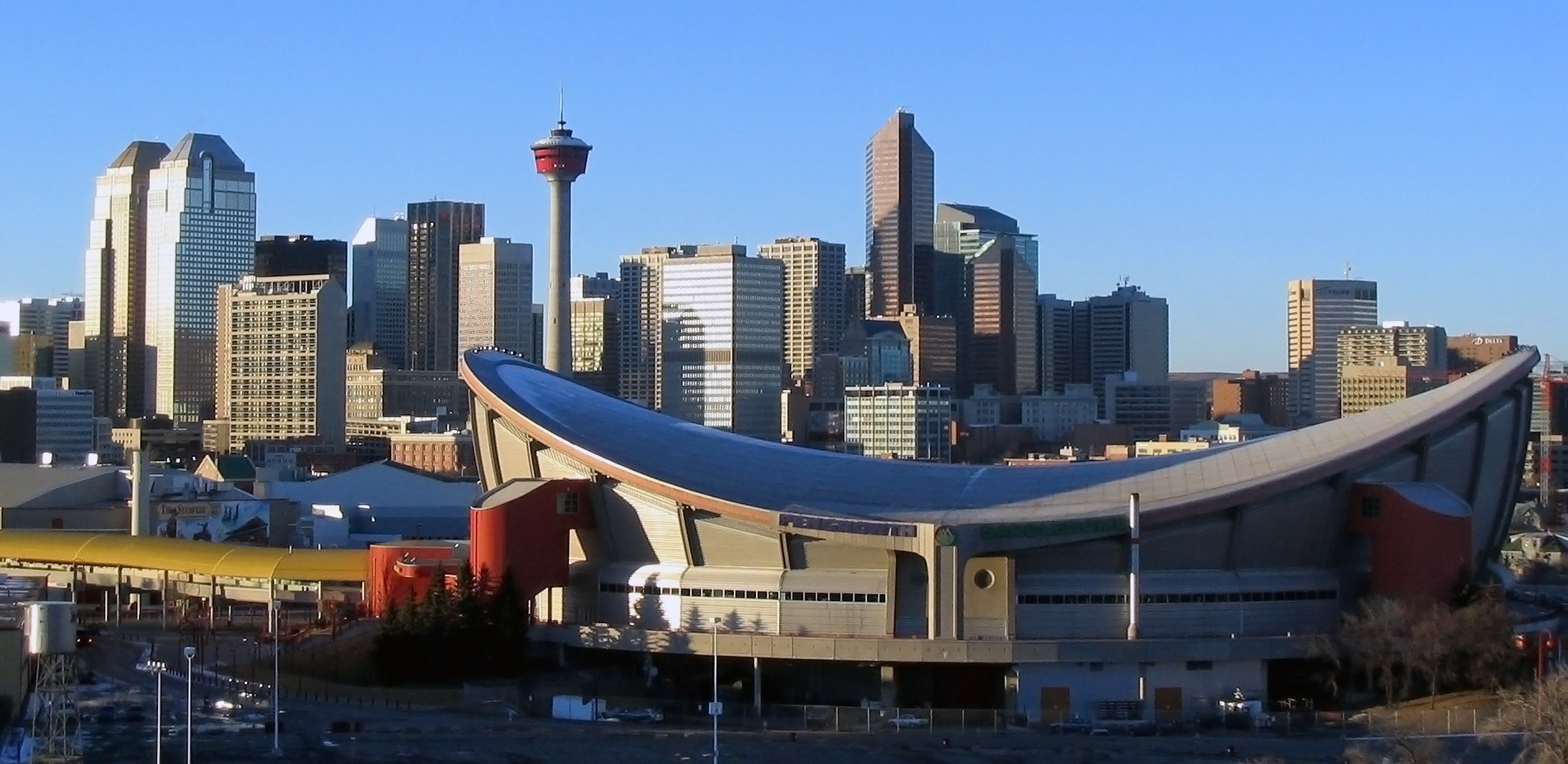
Calgary's population surpassed 1.1 million in 2013.

== Municipal census results ==
The following summarizes the results of the numerous municipal censuses conducted in 2012.

2012 municipal census summary				2011 federal census comparison				Previous municipal census comparison			
Municipality	Status	Census date	2012 pop.	2011 pop.	Absolute growth	Absolute change	Annual growth rate	Prev. pop.	Prev. census year	Absolute growth	Annual growth rate
Airdrie	City	April 1, 2012	45,711	42,564	3,147	7.4%	7.4%	43,155	2011	2,556	5.9%
Beaumont	Town	May 1, 2012	13,977	13,284	693	5.2%	5.2%	13,287	2011	690	5.2%
Beiseker	Village		780	785	−5	-0.6%	−0.6%	837	2008	−57	−1.7%
Blackfalds	Town	May 18, 2012	6,767	6,300	467	7.4%	7.4%	6,399	2011	368	5.8%
Bonnyville	Town	May 3, 2012	6,837	6,216	621	10%	10.0%	6,470	2009	367	1.9%
Breton	Village	May 15, 2012	581	496	85	17.1%	17.1%	579	2007	2	0.1%
Bruderheim	Town	April 1, 2012	1,298	1,155	143	12.4%	12.4%	1,203	1990	95	0.3%
Buffalo Lake	Metis settlement	June 4, 2012	701	492	209	42.5%	42.5%	1,206	2009	−505	−16.5%
Calgary	City	April 1, 2012	1,120,225	1,096,833	23,392	2.1%	2.1%	1,090,936	2011	29,289	2.7%
Chestermere	Town	May 12, 2012	15,352	14,824	528	3.6%	3.6%	14,682	2011	670	4.6%
Clear Hills County	Municipal district	May 22, 2012	2,829	2,801	28	1%	1.0%	2,970	2008	−141	−1.2%
Coalhurst	Town	May 22, 2012	2,269	1,963	306	15.6%	15.6%	1,953	2010	316	7.8%
Cold Lake	City	April 15, 2012	14,400	13,839	561	4.1%	4.1%	13,924	2009	476	1.1%
Consort	Village	May 15, 2012	722	689	33	4.8%	4.8%	696	2000	26	0.3%
East Prairie	Metis settlement	June 4, 2012	345	366	−21	-5.7%	−5.7%	906	2009	−561	−27.5%
Edgerton	Village	May 1, 2012	401	317	84	26.5%	26.5%	393	2007	8	0.4%
Edmonton	City	April 1, 2012	817,498	812,201	5,297	0.7%	0.7%	782,439	2009	35,059	1.5%
Edson	Town	May 31, 2012	8,646	8,475	171	2%	2.0%	8,365	2005	281	0.5%
Elizabeth	Metis settlement	June 4, 2012	671	654	17	2.6%	2.6%	820	2009	−149	−6.5%
Elk Point	Town	April 18, 2012	1,571	1,412	159	11.3%	11.3%	1,512	2007	59	0.8%
Fishing Lake	Metis settlement	June 4, 2012	425	436	−11	-2.5%	−2.5%	952	2009	−527	−23.6%
Fort Saskatchewan	City	April 30, 2012	20,475	19,051	1,424	7.5%	7.5%	18,653	2010	1,822	4.8%
Gift Lake	Metis settlement	June 4, 2012	791	662	129	19.5%	19.5%	1,115	2010	−324	−15.8%
Hughenden	Village	May 5, 2012	258	230	28	12.2%	12.2%	266	2008	−8	−0.8%
Innisfail	Town	May 1, 2012	7,922	7,876	46	0.6%	0.6%	7,883	2009	39	0.2%
Kapasiwin	Summer village	June 19, 2012	14	10	4	40%	40.0%	14	2011	0	0.0%
Kikino	Metis settlement	June 4, 2012	810	964	−154	-16%	−16.0%	1,113	2009	−303	−10.1%
Leduc	City	April 30, 2012	25,482	24,279	1,203	5%	5.0%	24,139	2011	1,343	5.6%
Lethbridge	City	April 1, 2012	89,074	83,517	5,557	6.7%	6.7%	87,882	2011	1,192	1.4%
Medicine Hat	City	June 1, 2012	61,180	60,005	1,175	2%	2.0%	61,097	2009	83	0.0%
Okotoks	Town	May 24, 2012	24,962	24,511	451	1.8%	1.8%	23,981	2011	981	4.1%
Oyen	Town	June 8, 2012	1,070	973	97	10%	10.0%	1,190	2009	−120	−3.5%
Paddle Prairie	Metis settlement	June 4, 2012	464	562	−98	-17.4%	−17.4%	1,089	2009	−625	−24.8%
Peavine	Metis settlement	June 4, 2012	651	690	−39	-5.7%	−5.7%	905	2009	−254	−10.4%
Penhold	Town	June 1, 2012	2,476	2,375	101	4.3%	4.3%	2,322	2010	154	3.3%
Raymond	Town	May 15, 2012	3,891	3,743	148	4%	4.0%	3,864	2011	27	0.7%
Redwater	Town	May 16, 2012	2,116	1,915	201	10.5%	10.5%	2,120	2000	−4	0.0%
Rocky Mountain House	Town	June 19, 2012	7,300	6,933	367	5.3%	5.3%	7,231	2007	69	0.2%
Rosemary	Village	May 14, 2012	421	342	79	23.1%	23.1%	311	1981	110	1.0%
Silver Sands	Summer village	May 1, 2012	154	85	69	81.2%	81.2%	72	1982	82	2.6%
South View	Summer village	May 1, 2012	76	35	41	117.1%	117.1%	33	1981	43	2.7%
Spring Lake	Village	May 1, 2012	614	533	81	15.2%	15.2%	592	2007	22	0.7%
St. Albert	City	April 2, 2012	60,994	61,466	−472	-0.8%	−0.8%	60,138	2010	856	0.7%
St. Paul	Town	May 15, 2012	5,844	5,400	444	8.2%	8.2%	5,632	2010	212	1.9%
County of St. Paul No. 19	Municipal district	April 1, 2012	6,168	5,831	337	5.8%	5.8%	6,352	1984	−184	−0.1%
Strathcona County	Specialized municipality	May 1, 2012	92,403	92,490	−87	-0.1%	−0.1%	87,998	2009	4,405	1.6%
Strathmore	Town	April 1, 2012	12,352	12,305	47	0.4%	0.4%	12,139	2010	213	0.9%
Sundre	Town	June 7, 2012	2,695	2,610	85	3.3%	3.3%	2,190	1999	505	1.6%
Thorsby	Village	April 1, 2012	947	951	−4	-0.4%	−0.4%	988	2010	−41	−2.1%
Three Hills	Town	April 2, 2012	3,230	3,198	32	1%	1.0%	3,322	2008	−92	−0.7%
Two Hills	Town	May 7, 2012	1,431	1,379	52	3.8%	3.8%	1,232	2007	199	3.0%
Vegreville	Town	April 1, 2012	5,758	5,717	41	0.7%	0.7%	5,834	2009	−76	−0.4%
Vermilion	Town	April 15, 2012	4,545	3,930	615	15.6%	15.6%	4,472	2007	73	0.3%
Vilna	Village	June 18, 2012	290	249	41	16.5%	16.5%	302	1998	−12	−0.3%
Vulcan County	Municipal district	April 4, 2012	3,893	3,875	18	0.5%	0.5%	3,830	2007	63	0.3%
Wembley	Town	April 15, 2012	1,410	1,383	27	2%	2.0%	1,542	2001	−132	−0.8%
RM of Wood Buffalo	Specialized municipality	May 9, 2012	74,631	65,565	9,066	13.8%	13.8%	66,748	2007	7,883	2.3%
Yellowstone	Summer village	May 1, 2012	131	178	−47	-26.4%	−26.4%	97	1992	34	1.5%

== Breakdowns ==
=== Urban and rural service areas ===
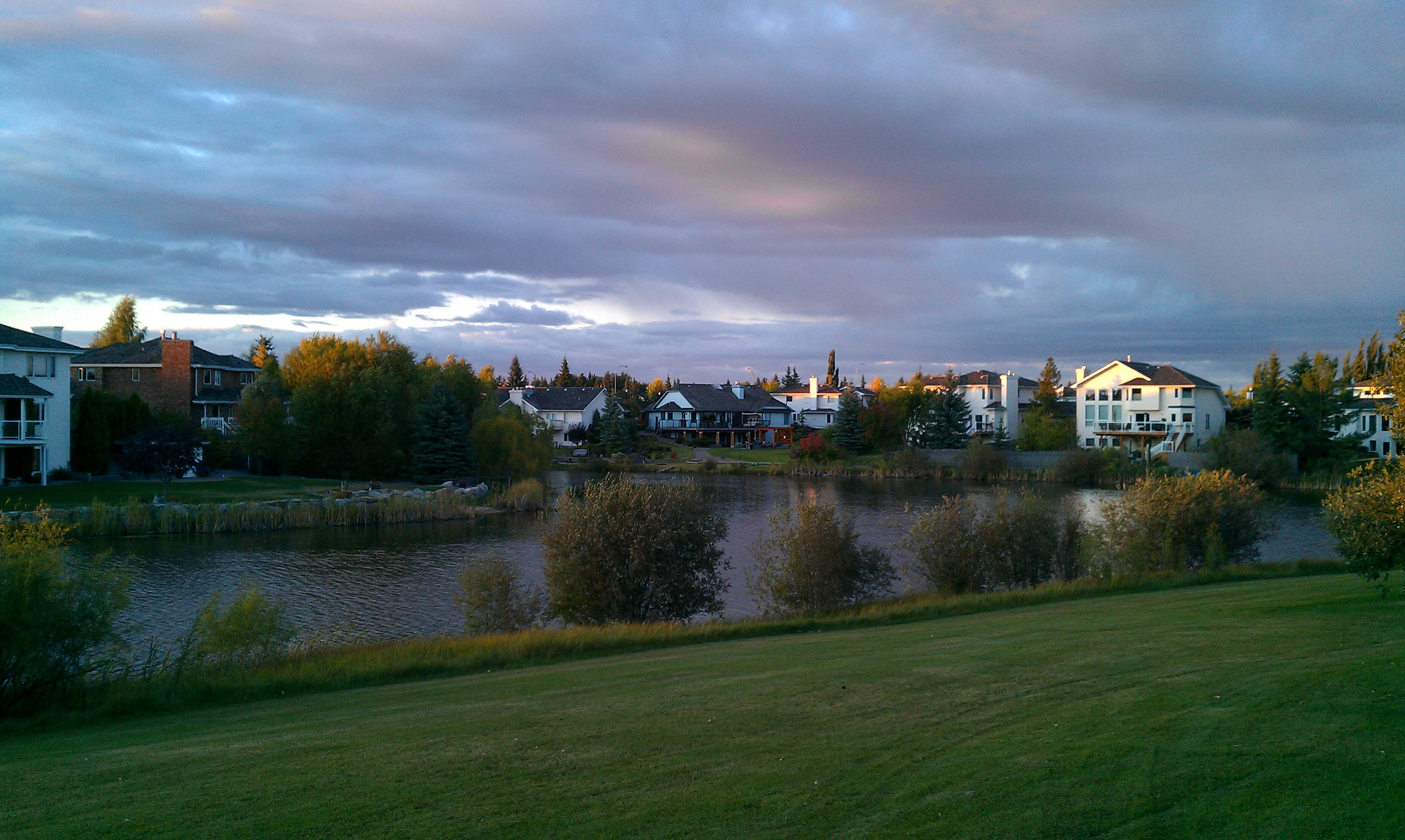
Strathcona County's 2012 census revealed that the Sherwood Park urban service area's population has surpassed 65,000.

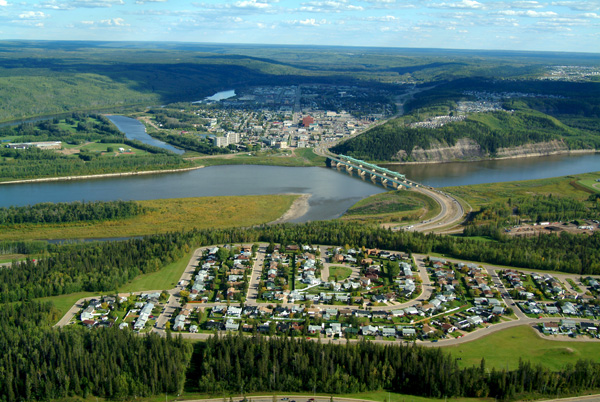
Wood Buffalo's population declined between 2010 and 2012, most of which was due to only achieving 95.5% enumeration in 2012.

==== Strathcona County ====
2012 municipal census summary		2009 municipal census comparison		
Area	2012 population	Previous population	Absolute growth	Annual growth rate
Sherwood Park urban service area (Note: The Fort McMurray and Sherwood Park urban service areas are deemed equivalents of cities.)	65,465	61,660	3,805	2.0%
Rural service area (Note: Strathcona County's and the RM of Wood Buffalo's rural service areas are deemed equivalents of municipal districts.)	26,938	26,338	600	0.8%
Total Strathcona County	92,403	87,998	4,405	1.6%

==== Wood Buffalo ====
2012 municipal census summary		2010 municipal census comparison		
Area	2012 population	Previous population	Absolute growth	Annual growth rate
Fort McMurray urban service area	70,964 (Note: Fort McMurray's population is based on 95.5% enumeration. The RM of Wood Buffalo has extrapolated this population to 74,029 based on 100% enumeration.)	74,709	−3,745	−2.5%
Rural service area	3,667	4,216	−549	−6.7%
Total RM of Wood Buffalo	74,631	78,925	−4,294	−2.8%

=== Hamlets ===
The following is a list of hamlet populations determined by 2012 municipal censuses conducted by Strathcona County and the Regional Municipality (RM) of Wood Buffalo excluding the urban service areas of Fort McMurray and Sherwood Park that are presented above.

2012 municipal census summary			Previous census comparison			
Hamlet	Municipality	2012 population	Previous population	Previous census year	Absolute growth	Annual growth rate
Antler Lake	Strathcona County	353	337	2009	16	1.6%
Anzac	RM of Wood Buffalo	714	785	2010	−71	−4.6%
Ardrossan	Strathcona County	514	434	2009	80	5.8%
Collingwood Cove	Strathcona County	362	331	2009	31	3.0%
Conklin	RM of Wood Buffalo	318	337	2010	−19	−2.9%
Fort Chipewyan	RM of Wood Buffalo	1,008	1,261	2010	−253	−10.6%
Fort MacKay	RM of Wood Buffalo	59	44	2010	15	15.8%
Gregoire Lake Estates	RM of Wood Buffalo	275	248	2010	27	5.3%
Half Moon Lake	Strathcona County	226	212	2009	14	2.2%
Hastings Lake	Strathcona County	92	77	2009	15	6.1%
Janvier	RM of Wood Buffalo	171	195	2010	−24	−6.4%
Josephburg	Strathcona County	233	237	2009	−4	−0.6%
North Cooking Lake	Strathcona County	66	49	2009	17	10.4%
Saprae Creek	RM of Wood Buffalo	925	926	2010	−1	−0.1%
South Cooking Lake	Strathcona County	294	293	2009	1	0.1%

== Shadow population counts ==
Alberta Municipal Affairs defines shadow population as "temporary residents of a municipality who are employed by an industrial or commercial establishment in the municipality for a minimum of 30 days within a municipal census year." The RM of Wood Buffalo conducted a shadow population count in 2012. The following presents the results of this count for comparison with its concurrent municipal census results.

Municipality	Status	Municipal census population	Shadow population	Combined population
RM of Wood Buffalo	Specialized municipality	74,631	41,776	116,407

== See also ==
- List of communities in Alberta
- List of municipalities in Alberta
