= Northern Lakes College =

Community college in Alberta, Canada

- Former name: Alberta Vocational College Lesser Slave Lake
- Type: Public comprehensive community college
- Established: 25 August 1999
- Affiliations: CICan, CCAA, AACTI, Alberta-North
- President: Glenn Mitchell
- Administrative staff: 275 in 2003
- Students: 1,846 (2023-24 fulltime equivalent)
- Undergraduates: 1,864 full time and part time credit students and 3,341 non credit students.
- Postgraduates: not available
- Other students: vocational
- Location: Slave Lake, Alberta, Canada; 55.27454°N 114.77736°W
- Campus: suburban/remote Northern Alberta 25 campuses include Slave Lake and Grouard
- Website: Northern Lakes College

Northern Lakes College is a publicly funded comprehensive community college in northern Alberta, Canada.

Administrative offices are located in Slave Lake and Grouard, Alberta, with a staff of more than 275 working in more than 25 community campuses. The college connects students from throughout the region with the latest in real-time teaching and learning technology to create manageable class cohorts.

The college is a member of the Alberta Rural Development Network.

== Education programs ==
The college offers education and training programs that include: trades and apprenticeship, career education, university studies and work force development. Career choices include the following:

- Business Administration
- Community Liaison
- Forestry
- Health Care
- Office Administration
- Paramedicine
- Petroleum
- Power Engineering
- Practical Nurse
- Production Field Operations
- Rehabilitation Therapy
- Social Work
- Teaching

== Locations ==
The following communities are served by Northern Lakes College:

- Athabasca
- Atikameg
- Barrhead
- Cadotte Lake
- Calling Lake
- Driftpile
- East Prairie
- Fairview
- Flatbush
- Fort Vermilion
- Fox Creek, Alberta
- Gift Lake
- Grande Prairie
- Grouard
- High Level
- High Prairie
- La Crete
- Manning
- Marten Lakes
- Paddle Prairie
- Peace River
- Peavine
- Peerless Lake
- Slave Lake
- Wabasca
- Swan Hills
- Trout Lake
- Valleyview

== History ==
In 1970 and 1971, in Grouard, Alberta, First Nations students received adult education basic training to prepare to become instructors in Community Vocational Centres (CVC's) area.

In 1988 the Alberta Vocational Centre in Grouard amalgamated with a network of 26 community vocational centres for First Nations students in northern Alberta to form the Alberta Vocational College. The governance of the converted into a college governed by a public board from a provincially administered school on September 1, 1997.

The current name, Northern Lakes College, replaced the name Alberta Vocational College on August 25, 1999.

== See also ==
- Education in Alberta
- List of universities and colleges in Alberta
