= Paddle Prairie Metis Settlement =

Métis settlement in Alberta, Canada

Paddle Prairie
- Metis settlement
- Paddle Prairie Metis Settlement; Keg River Metis Colony No. 1 (formerly)
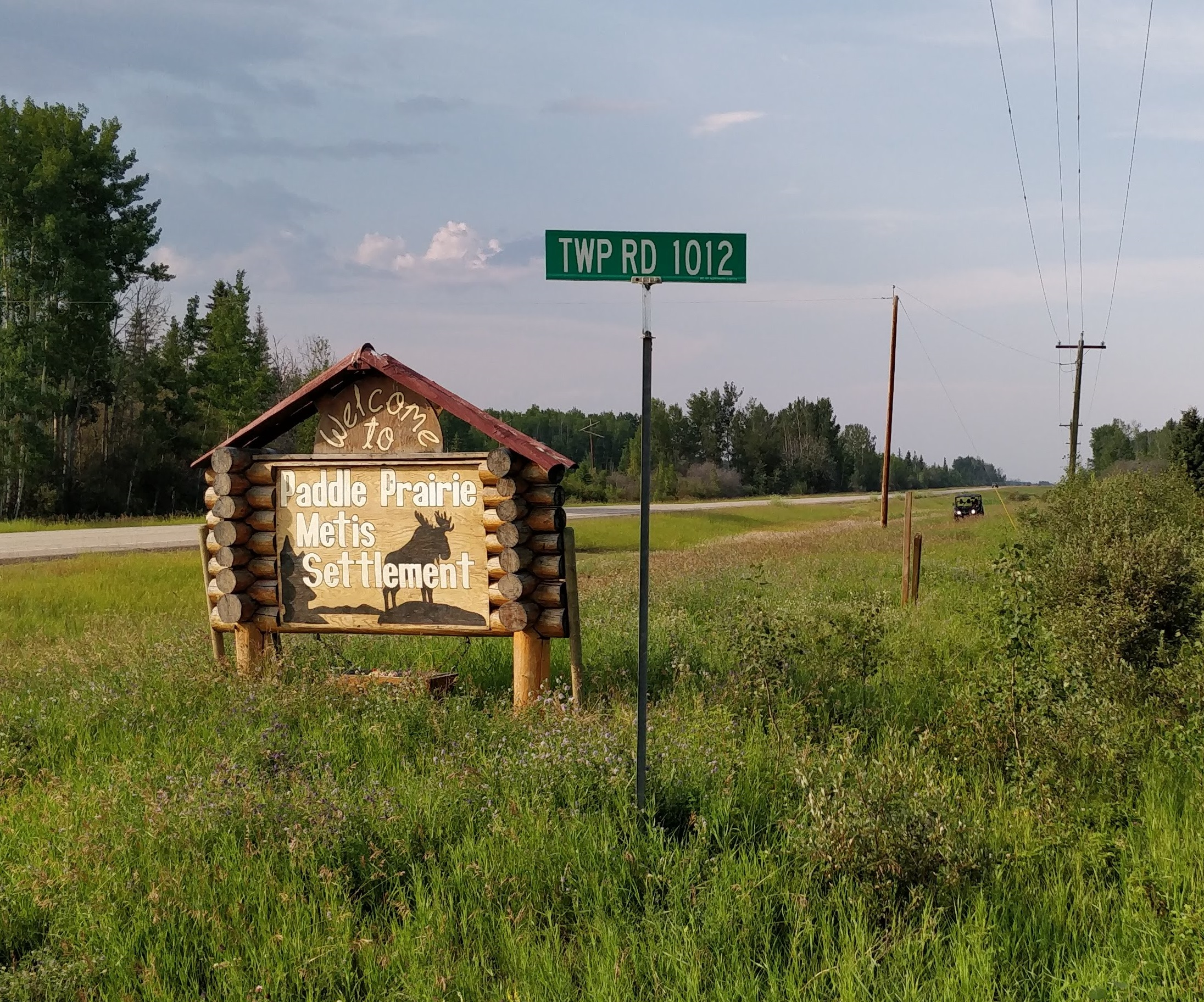
- Southern boundary of Paddle Prairie

- Boundaries of Paddle Prairie

- Location within County of Northern Lights

- Location within Alberta
- Coordinates: 57°57′N 117°28′W
- Country: Canada
- Province: Alberta
- Region: Northern Alberta
- Planning region: Lower Peace
- Municipal district: Northern Lights
- Established: May 9, 1939

Government
  - Chair: Eldon Armstrong
  - Governing body: Paddle Prairie Metis Council

Area (2021)
  - Land: 335.68 km^{2} (129.61 sq mi)

Population (2021)
  - Total: 379
  - Density: 1.1/km^{2} (2.8/sq mi)
- Time zone: UTC−06:00 (Alberta Time)
- Website: https://paddleprairiemetis.com/

Paddle Prairie Metis Settlement is a Métis settlement in northern Alberta, Canada along the northern boundary of the County of Northern Lights. It is located along the Mackenzie Highway (Highway 35), approximately 72 km (45 mi) south of the Town of High Level. Paddle Prairie Metis Settlement is the largest of eight Metis Settlements in the province of Alberta. The community is rich in timber, natural resources and agricultural land. The community is also known for constructing solar power generating units for several of its community buildings.

== History ==
The Great Depression of the 1930s saw much deprivation among the nomadic Métis population of Alberta, estimated at 11,000 in 1936. A royal commission was formed to investigate the living conditions of Alberta's "half-breeds" (as the Métis were known), who were then squatting on road allowances with no ready sources of cash income, or trapping in remote areas without access to education or health services.

This Ewing Commission saw agriculture, particularly stock-raising, as the means by which the Métis could be made into "self-supporting citizens". Farm colonies, in which the Métis themselves would provide most of the physical labour, would be a suitably inexpensive relief scheme for the cash-strapped Alberta government to implement.

Following these recommendations, the 1938 Metis Population Betterment Act enabled unoccupied Crown land to be set aside for the creation of new Métis settlements. Eleven were originally created by Order-in-Council through 1938 and 1939 – Wolf Lake, Utikuma Lake (now Gift Lake), Cold Lake, Marlboro, Keg River (now Paddle Prairie), Big Prairie (now Peavine), Touchwood, Goodfish Lake (now Kikino), Elizabeth, Fishing Lake, and East Prairie. Caslan (now Buffalo Lake) was the final addition, reserved for Métis veterans returning from World War II before being thrown open to general settlement in 1951.

Settlement at Paddle Prairie progressed rapidly. A 1941 report of the Alberta Bureau of Public Welfare recorded nineteen heads of families resident in the area, with a total population of 72. The settlement's central village was established at its approximate geographic center, the Paddle Prairie proper, an area of open land and productive soil, where a lumbering operation produced 91,372 board feet of rough sawn lumber. From here, 23 kilometres (14 mi) of road was cleared to a landing on the Peace River, suitable for the unloading of supplies.

== Geography ==
The largest and most northerly of Alberta's Metis settlements, Paddle Prairie consists of approximately seventeen townships. It is bounded by the Peace River on its eastern border, where the La Crete ferry still operates.

== Demographics ==
In the 2021 Census of Population conducted by Statistics Canada, Paddle Prairie had a population of 551 living in 212 of its 256 total private dwellings, a change of 1.3% from its 2016 population of 544. With a land area of 1,726.45 km^{2} (666.59 sq mi), it had a population density of 0.3/km^{2} (0.8/sq mi) in 2021.

The population of the Paddle Prairie Metis Settlement according to its 2018 municipal census is 536, an increase from its 2015 municipal census population count of 530.

As a designated place in the 2016 Census of Population conducted by Statistics Canada, the Paddle Prairie Metis Settlement had a population of 544 living in 185 of its 240 total private dwellings, a decline of 3.2% from its 2011 population of 562. With a land area of 1,738.82 km^{2} (671 sq mi), it had a population density of 0.3 inhabitants per square kilometre (0.8/sq mi) in 2016.

== See also ==
- List of communities in Alberta
- List of designated places in Alberta
