= Grouard =

Grouard Grouard Mission
- Hamlet
- Location of Grouard Grouard (Canada)
- Coordinates: 55°31′13″N 116°09′40″W
- Country: Canada
- Province: Alberta
- Region: Northern Alberta
- Census division: 17
- Municipal district: Big Lakes County

Government
  - Type: Unincorporated
  - Governing body: Big Lakes County Council

Area (2021)
  - Land: 4.52 km^{2} (1.75 sq mi)

Population (2021)
  - Total: 166
  - Density: 36.7/km^{2} (95/sq mi)
- Time zone: UTC−06:00 (Alberta Time)
- Area codes: 780, 587, 825

Grouard, also known as Grouard Mission, is a hamlet in northern Alberta within Big Lakes County. It was previously an incorporated municipality between 1909 and 1944.

Grouard is located 13 kilometres (8.1 mi) north of Highway 2, approximately 171 kilometres (106 mi) northeast of Grande Prairie. It is the administrative office of the Kapawe'no First Nations.

== Location ==
Grouard is located near the western shore of one of the three lakes in Big Lakes County, Lesser Slave Lake.

== Etymology ==
The original site was called Stony Point in the Cree language.

The hamlet was called Lesser Slave Lake, until its name was changed to Grouard in 1900 when the town was built. It was named after the Catholic Bishop Émile Grouard, who was a missionary in the north for sixty-nine years. He moved his headquarters to Grouard in 1920, and died there in 1931. It was also referred to as Grouard Mission.

== History ==
Grouard has a rich Indigenous history, which includes the signing of Treaty 8 in 1899. The hamlet, which is in what is now known as Big Lakes County, is located ten kilometres south of the earliest non-Indigenous settlement in the area, where the North West Company established a post in 1802 at Buffalo Bay. In 1871, the Roman Catholic Church followed with a mission, St. Bernard or Grouard Mission, at Stony Point ten kilometres south of the Buffalo Bay post. The Dunvegan mission, built in 1805, served as headquarters for the fur trade along the Peace River. and was also oldest permanent Catholic mission in the area. It was the second oldest permanent Catholic missionary base in the region. The Lesser Slave Lake had considerable populations of Cree and Metis, and Grouard was considered to be a northern Alberta hub for trade and transportation.

The site, which was then known as Stony Point in Cree, was chosen for the historical signing of Treaty 8 between representatives of the Queen Victoria and various First Nations of the Lesser Slave Lake area, the Cree, Beaver, Chipewyan nations, on whose traditional lands, the Crown wanted to "open for settlement, immigration, trade, travel, mining, lumbering" etc.

On September 27, 1909 Grouard was incorporated as a village. and then as a town in December, 1912.

From 1910 until 1916 Grouard was well situated on the transportation route to the Peace River district. In 1913, the community had a population of more than 1,000. In 1916 the Edmonton, Dunvegan and British Columbia Railway (EDBCR) bypassed Grouard by building just 12 miles (19 km) south of the town, choosing instead Lesser Slave Lake's southern shore. The town but was largely abandoned. Many of the residents and businesses moved to High Prairie, a community on the railway line.

Grouard reverted from town status to village status on June 7, 1940, and then dissolved from village status on January 15, 1944 to become part of Improvement District No. 764.

== Demographics ==
In the 2021 Census of Population conducted by Statistics Canada, Grouard had a population of 166 living in 79 of its 117 total private dwellings, a change of −34.9% from its 2016 population of 255. With a land area of 4.52 km^{2} (1.75 sq mi), it had a population density of 36.7/km^{2} (95.1/sq mi) in 2021.

As a designated place in the 2016 Census of Population conducted by Statistics Canada, Grouard Mission had a population of 255 living in 85 of its 110 total private dwellings, a change of −15.8% from its 2011 population of 303. With a land area of 4.56 km^{2} (1.76 sq mi), it had a population density of 55.9/km^{2} (144.8/sq mi) in 2016.

== Education ==
Northland School Division No. 61 hosts grades K-9. Students who continue from grade 9 travel by bus to attend high school in High Prairie. Grouard students also have the option to attend school from K-12 in High Prairie.

=== Northern Lakes College (NLC) ===
Grourd and Slave Lake have administrative offices of the Northern Lakes College, a public, comprehensive, community college that is board-governed with over twenty-five campuses in communities across northern Alberta. NLC acknowledges that it is located on Treaty 8 territory and Metis nations regions and traditional First Nations and Metis land.

The Alberta Vocational College (AVC) was renamed the Northern Lakes College on August 25, 1999.

==== NLC history ====
In 1970 and 1971, the hamlet of Grouard which is adjacent to Treaty 8 Kapawe'no First Nation land, became the site of Vocational Centre—one of a group of sister Community Vocational Centres (CVC's). First Nations students received adult education basic training in Grouard at the Centre to prepare to become instructors in the area covered by the CVC's.

In 1986, major changed were taking place in the Alberta Vocational College (AVC) without consulting those affected, including moving dozens of married students living quarters, programs and materials to High Prairie from Grouard. Grouard residents held demonstrations in protest. The decision was overturned following a meeting which including MLAs and Alberta cabinet ministers. Harold Cardinal, leader of the Indian Association of Alberta for nine terms and former chief of Sucker Creek First Nation asked the Education Minister Dave Russell to not let education at AVC be downgraded and to not ignore the formal political structures First National already had in place to deal with the issue. A working committee composed of First Nations members was created and it was agreed that the college programs would not be moved from Grouard to High Prairie without consultation.

In 1988, the Alberta Vocational Centre in Grouard amalgamated with a network of 26 community vocational centres for First Nations students in northern Alberta to form the Alberta Vocational College. As of September 1, 1997, the AVC has been governed by a public board. Prior to that it was administered by province of Alberta.

Northern Lakes College is one of ancillary spaces that is part of Kapawe'no First Nation School, which is located within the Kapawe'no First Nation. In 2019 the Kapawe’no First Nation School Authority and Kapawe'no First Nation School received authorization under Alberta's Department of Education. The school became fully operational soon after, and offers education from kindergarten through grade twelve.

The Native Cultural Arts Museum is a part of Northern Lakes College and is located in the Moosehorn Lodge at the Grouard campus. The Museum's collection celebrates various aspects of Indigenous cultures, with a special focus on Métis peoples and the Woodland Cree of northern Alberta.

== Historically significant site ==
The Grouard Indian Residential School, also known as St. Bernard’s Residential School, in the then-hamlet of Grouard is included on the online Memorial site maintained by the National Center for Truth and Reconciliation (NCTRC) and UNESCO. The residential school was operated by the Roman Catholic Church from 1894 until 1957.

Approximately 169 potential unmarked graves were discovered on St. Bernard's property in 2022 using ground-penetrating radar and drones. Previously, the names of ten children who had died at St. Bernard's had been listed on the NCTRC and UNESCO Memorial site. The residential school operated from 1894 to 1961.

The St. Bernard mission's church and cemetery, also known as Grouard Mission Church, was recognized by Parks Canada as one of Canada's Historic Places.

== Lesser Slave Lake Regional Forests Plan ==
The Kapawe'no First Nation, whose headquarters are in Grouard, are one of a number of Treaty 8 First Nations and Métis settlements who provide input and expertise in the Lesser Slave Lake Regional Forest Management Plan. Their involvement in forest management respects the constitutional rights of First Nations and Métis Settlements to engage in hunting, fishing, and trapping and for other traditional uses, such as for burial, ceremonial, historical purposes. The First Nations who are included in these consultations include the Bigstone Cree Nation, Driftpile First Nation, Duncan's First Nation, Horse Lake First Nation, Kapawe'no First Nation, Lubicon Lake Band, Sawridge First Nation, Sturgeon Lake Cree Nation, Sucker Creek First Nation, Swan River First Nation, Whitefish Lake First Nation, Woodland Cree First Nation. The Métis Settlements include the East Prairie Métis Settlement, Gift Lake Métis Settlement, and the Peavine Métis Settlement.

== Notable people ==
- Pearl Calahasen, Canadian politician, Progressive Conservative MLA and cabinet minister (1989-2015)

== See also ==
- List of communities in Alberta
- List of designated places in Alberta
- List of former urban municipalities in Alberta
- List of hamlets in Alberta
- Roman Catholic Archdiocese of Grouard–McLennan
