= Enilda =

- Hamlet
- Location of Enilda Enilda (Canada)
- Coordinates: 55°25′01″N 116°18′41″W
- Country: Canada
- Province: Alberta
- Region: Northern Alberta
- Census division: 17
- Municipal district: Big Lakes County

Government
  - Type: Unincorporated
  - Governing body: Big Lakes County Council

Area (2021)
  - Land: 0.72 km^{2} (0.28 sq mi)

Population (2021)
  - Total: 145
  - Density: 202.2/km^{2} (524/sq mi)
- Time zone: UTC−06:00 (Alberta Time)
- Area codes: 780, 587, 825

Enilda is a hamlet in northern Alberta within Big Lakes County, located 10 kilometres (6.2 mi) west of Highway 49, approximately 97 kilometres (60 mi) northeast of Grande Prairie.

The community's name is an anadrome of Adline, after Adline Tompkins, an early postmaster's wife.

== Demographics ==
Population history of Enilda
Year	Pop.	±%
1941	32	—
1951	77	+140.6%
1956	96	+24.7%
1961	106	+10.4%
1966	160	+50.9%
1971	201	+25.6%
1976	164	−18.4%
1981	142	−13.4%
1986	128	−9.9%
1991	156	+21.9%
1991A	157	+0.6%
1996	179	+14.0%
2001	154	−14.0%
2006	160	+3.9%
2011	165	+3.1%
2016	155	−6.1%
2021	145	−6.5%
Source: Statistics Canada

In the 2021 Census of Population conducted by Statistics Canada, Enilda had a population of 145 living in 65 of its 74 total private dwellings, a change of −6.5% from its 2016 population of 155. With a land area of 0.72 km^{2} (0.28 sq mi), it had a population density of 201.4/km^{2} (521.6/sq mi) in 2021.

As a designated place in the 2016 Census of Population conducted by Statistics Canada, Enilda had a population of 155 living in 64 of its 73 total private dwellings, a change of −6.1% from its 2011 population of 165. With a land area of 0.72 km^{2} (0.28 sq mi), it had a population density of 215.3/km^{2} (557.6/sq mi) in 2016.

== See also ==
- List of communities in Alberta
- List of designated places in Alberta
- List of hamlets in Alberta
