= Métis in Alberta =

Aboriginal group of peoples

Alberta's Métis people are descendants of mixed First Nations/Indigenous peoples and White/European families. The Métis are considered an Aboriginal group under Canada's Constitution Act, 1982. They are separate and distinct from First Nations, though they live in the same regions and have cultural similarities, and have different legal rights.

== Alberta Métis people ==
Different Métis family groups attempted to combine the joint influences of the Manitoba Métis Federation, the Métis Nation of Alberta, and the Métis Nation Saskatchewan. This was done in hopes that Alberta's Métis would receive land and resource rights.

In Alberta, unlike in the rest of Canada, Métis people have certain lands reserved for them under the Métis Population Betterment Act of 1938, known today as the eight Métis settlements. These Métis settlements federated in 1975 to protect existing Métis settlement lands following the Alberta Government's dissolution, by order-in-council, of four Métis settlements from 1950 to 1960. Following legal challenges by the Federation of Métis Settlements in 1975 for the loss of natural resource against Alberta, the Crown in Right of Alberta settled out of court and passed a suite of legislation that would see self-government, land, and money transferred to the newly formed government of the Métis Settlements General Council (MSGC), Canada's only Métis self-government. The MSGC is the legislator of the Federation of Métis Settlements.

Most people who self-identify as Métis in Alberta do not live in a Métis settlement. According to the 2016 census, 57.7% of self-reported Métis in Alberta lived in either Census Division No. 11 (which includes the Edmonton Metropolitan Region) or Census Division No. 6 (which includes the Calgary Metropolitan Region), with the majority of those residing in Edmonton. These Métis people are represented politically by one of three organizations – the Métis Nation of Alberta (founded in 1928), the Alberta Métis Federation (founded in 2020), or the Aboriginal Congress of Alberta Association.

== History ==
Métis history in Alberta begins with the North American fur trade. The Métis developed as a people by the interactions of European fur trading agents and First Nations communities. From 1670 to 1821, Métis populations grew regionally, typically around fur-trading posts of the North-West Company and the Hudson's Bay Company. For example, Fort Edmonton spawned a large Métis population that was involved in an annual buffalo hunt for many years. These Métis helped to establish the nearby settlements of Lac Ste. Anne (1844), St. Albert (1861), Lac La Biche (1853), and St. Paul de Métis (1890). The Hudson's Bay Company's land claim in the west (called Rupert's Land) was sold to the newly formed Dominion of Canada with the passing of The British North America Act, 1867 (Canada's founding Constitution, 1867). The sale of the Hudson's Bay Company's territory in 1869/70 officially ended its legal monopoly on the fur trade (not enforced since the trial of Métis trapper Guillaume Sayer in 1849). The end of the monopoly on the fur trade was an economic boon for the Métis as it opened the fur and buffalo meat trades to private Métis and non-Metis traders. However, it also exposed them to a flood of European and Canadian colonists seeking to profit and disenfranchise the Métis from their lands. Métis living closer to Canadian-occupied territory such as the Red River Métis, today in parts of Manitoba and Saskatchewan, took up arms against the Canadian government in the two failed Riel Rebellions (or "Riel Resistances" in 1869 and 1885) in an attempt to assert their rights in the face of the newcomers. Following the rebellions, some Red River Métis fled northwest, married into the northwest Métis populations of northern Alberta (formerly known as the District of Athabaska in the North-West Territories) or assimilated into surrounding Euro-Canadian society. The end of these rebellions, combined with the colonially-driven collapse of the fur and buffalo-meat industries, forced many Albertan Métis off their lands and reduced them to critical levels of poverty. On the whole, the Métis cultures and communities survived with farming, ranching, fishing, and industry replacing their traditional economy of fur trading as the main economic activity in the Parkland Belt, though trapping and hunting have remained very important in the Rocky Mountain and boreal forest regions. More urban Métis who live in close proximity to other cultural groups may have intermarried and assimilated into mainstream Euro-Albertan society to the point that their descendants no longer recognize themselves as Métis. However, in much of northern Alberta, the Métis in more remote rural and isolated communities have remained culturally distinct. Many of the contemporary Métis settlement population have retained their unique cultural heritage and history due to land grants provided by King George V by way of the Metis Population Betterment Act of 1938. This act gave back a certain amount of land to the Métis for their use. In 1990, the constitution would be the Alberta Amendment Act 3.

As a response to Métis dispossession and impoverishment following the collapse of the fur trade and marginalization of Métis by the newly dominant Canadian society, Métis political organization, dormant since the Riel Rebellions, was revived in the 1920s by a number of competing organizations such as the Half-Breed Association, the Métis Association, and the Half-breed Association of Northern Alberta. In 1932, a lasting and successful organization was founded following large half-breed gatherings in Frog Lake and Fishing Lake. These gatherings were organized by grassroots leaders such as Charles Delores and Dieudonne Collins. They called upon the expertise of a local enfranchised Indian named Joseph Dion of the Kehewin Cree Nation, approximately 20 km (12 mi) from St. Paul Des Metis. The lasting organization would be known as "L'Association des Métis d'Alberta et les Territories du Nord-Ouest" by the Métis "famous five" – Malcolm Norris, Jim Brady, Peter Tomkins, Joseph Dion, and Felix Calliou. This organization would fight for the recognition and formal establishment of the Métis settlements. The famous five would go on to pressure the Government of Alberta on behalf of the Métis populations for a protected homeland. In response to their lobbying, the Alberta legislature would call for a Royal Commission, entitled "The Ewing Commission", to investigate the conditions of the "Half-Breeds" (Métis) within the province. The Ewing Commission's final report called for a Métis land base and that it be provided by the provincial government under the Natural Resource Transfer Act, 1930.

In 1895, permanent settlements were erected. Ottawa had allowed the Oblate missionaries to enter into a 21-year lease under the Dominion Lands Act.

The result of the report was the creation of twelve Métis settlements in 1938 by way of the Métis Population Betterment Act. In the late 1950s, four of these settlements (Touchwood, Marlboro, Cold Lake, and Wolf Lake) were closed, requiring residents to relocate to the remaining eight settlements, all north of Edmonton. In 1938, the Peavine Metis Settlement encompassed 86,245 ha (213,120 acres) of boreal forest. Due to being resettled so many times, the Métis on the Peavine Metis Settlement were not very connected to that land compared to their ancestors.

The Alberta Federation of Metis Settlements, now Metis Settlements of Alberta, was formed in 1975 as the umbrella organization to unite all eight settlement councils.

Different Métis groups attempted to combine the joint influences of the Manitoba Métis Federation, the Métis Nation of Alberta, and Métis Nation Saskatchewan. This was done in hope that the Métis of Alberta would receive land and resource rights.

In 1989, through decades of negotiations and meetings, the Alberta Federation of Metis Settlements and the Government of Alberta reached an agreement, the Alberta-Metis Settlements Accord, that involved the payment of $310 million to the Métis and the passage of four bills. The legislation consisted of the Metis Settlements Accord Implementation Act (Bill 33), the Metis Settlements Land Protection Act (Bill 34), the Metis Settlements Act (Bill 35), and the Constitution of Alberta Amendment Act 1990 (Bill 36). Through this legislation, title to a total of 1,250,000 acres (510,000 ha) of land was transferred to the Metis Settlements General Council (MSGC).

As of the 2006 Canadian census, Big Lakes County had the most Métis people per capita of any Canadian census subdivision with a population of 5,000 or more. This was due to the inclusion of the population of three Métis settlements within Big Lakes County's totals.

Recently, many other Métis people have moved to larger urban centres, becoming urban aboriginals. In 2006, a total of 27,740 persons living in the Edmonton census metropolitan area (CMA) identified as Métis, accounting for just over half (53%) of the region's Aboriginal population. Between 2001 and 2006, the Métis population in the Edmonton CMA grew by 32%. Despite their recent legal victories, Métis people in Alberta still faced higher rates of unemployment and disease and lower average incomes than their non-aboriginal neighbours as of 2006.

The exact population number of Métis people in Alberta is undetermined due to the dispute surrounding what qualifies a person to be considered "Métis". Usually, a Métis person is someone that descended from an Indigenous person and a Caucasian settler. However, there are a few different groups that consider themselves to be Métis including Indigenous peoples who are from Manitoba Red River Métis of the 1800s or all Indigenous peoples from Canada that are not recognized under the Indian Act.

=== Mountain Métis ===
The Mountain Métis are a distinct Métis group who are descendants of Métis who lived in the Athabasca River valley near Jasper House in the Rocky Mountains of Alberta. In 1909 and 1910, a small group of families were evicted from Jasper National Park by the federal government to enable the creation of the park. They were compensated only for their improvements made to the land and not the land itself. Their descendants have fought since that time for compensation and recognition of their rights as an Aboriginal group. Their lobbying (along with non-Métis trappers and guides) was partly responsible the creation of the Willmore Wilderness Park in the 1950s, which they hoped would protect this hunting and trapping ground from oil and gas exploration. They have since come into conflict with some environmentalists and government officials who would prefer to exclude hunting and trapping from all parks in Alberta.

The Mountain Métis are represented by Grande Cache Metis Local 1994, a local affiliate of the Métis Nation of Alberta.

== Politics ==
The Government of Canada has been in negotiations since with two Métis organizations, the Métis Nation of Alberta (MNA) since 2016 and the Métis Settlements General Council (MSGC) since 2017. The MSGC "is the political and administrative body for the collective interests of the eight Metis Settlements... the General Council has 44 members consisting of 40 elected members from the Settlements, and 4 elected Executive members." In June 2019, the Government of Canada signed a Métis Government Recognition and Self-Government Agreement with the Métis Nation of Alberta, by which Canada recognized that the Métis Nation within Alberta has an inherent right to self-government and mandated the MNA to implement this right on its behalf.

During the constitutional talks in the early 1980s, the MNAA was revived.

The mandate of the MNA is to:

- be a representative voice on behalf of Métis people in Alberta;
- provide Métis people an opportunity to participate in the government’s policy and decision making process; and
- promote and facilitate the advancement of Métis people through the pursuit of self-reliance, self-determination, and self-management.

Overall, the MNA has evolved from an organization:

- with a small membership to an organization whose membership exceeds 35,000 people spread across Alberta;
- focused on community consultation and representation to an organization that is both a representative body and a program and service provider;
- responsible for implementing specific projects to an organization responsible for providing ongoing programs and services; and
- that simply reacted to government policy changes to an organization that is called upon to actively participate in the policy formulation process.

Expectations have been established for the MNA through the:

- Alberta/MNA Framework Agreement process;
- Federal/Provincial/MNA Tripartite Process Agreement process; and
- Government of Alberta’s Aboriginal Policy Framework.

A steady rise has been observed in the number of Métis people in Alberta who have registered as members of the MNA. Métis people in Alberta are recognizing the benefits of MNA memberships and the importance of the MNA as an organization.

As well, the MNA has transitioned from solely a representative body to an organization responsible and accountable for the ongoing delivery of a variety of programs and services. The MNA continues to make strides as an organization and develops and implements a number of projects and initiatives (including Apeetogosan Development Inc., Métis Urban Housing Corporation of Alberta, and the Aboriginal Human Resource Development Agreement – Labour Market Unit.)

The MNA has responsibilities and expectations and becoming a more results-based organization. It has addressed issues relating to internal governance and has developed the administrative capacity to meet the expectations that are placed upon the MNA.

The MNA plays a role in the policy development process. Its elected officials and staff sit on committees responsible for an array of issues.

The Rupertsland Institute of Alberta is an affiliate to the Metis Nation of Alberta. Its mission is to enhance the individual self-sufficiency and the collective well-being of Metis people through education, training, and research.

=== Powley Case ===
The Powley Case, which wound through the various levels of Ontario courts starting in 1993, was a law-defining case that is recognized as the first time the issue of Métis rights were recognized under section 35 of the Constitution Act, 1982. Steve Powley was scrutinized and almost punished for knowingly hunting without a license in Sault Ste. Marie, Ontario. When the case eventually made it to the Supreme Court of Canada, Powley's actions were confirmed as being protected by the Métis Aboriginal right to hunt, and the case was dismissed in 2003.

== List of settlements ==
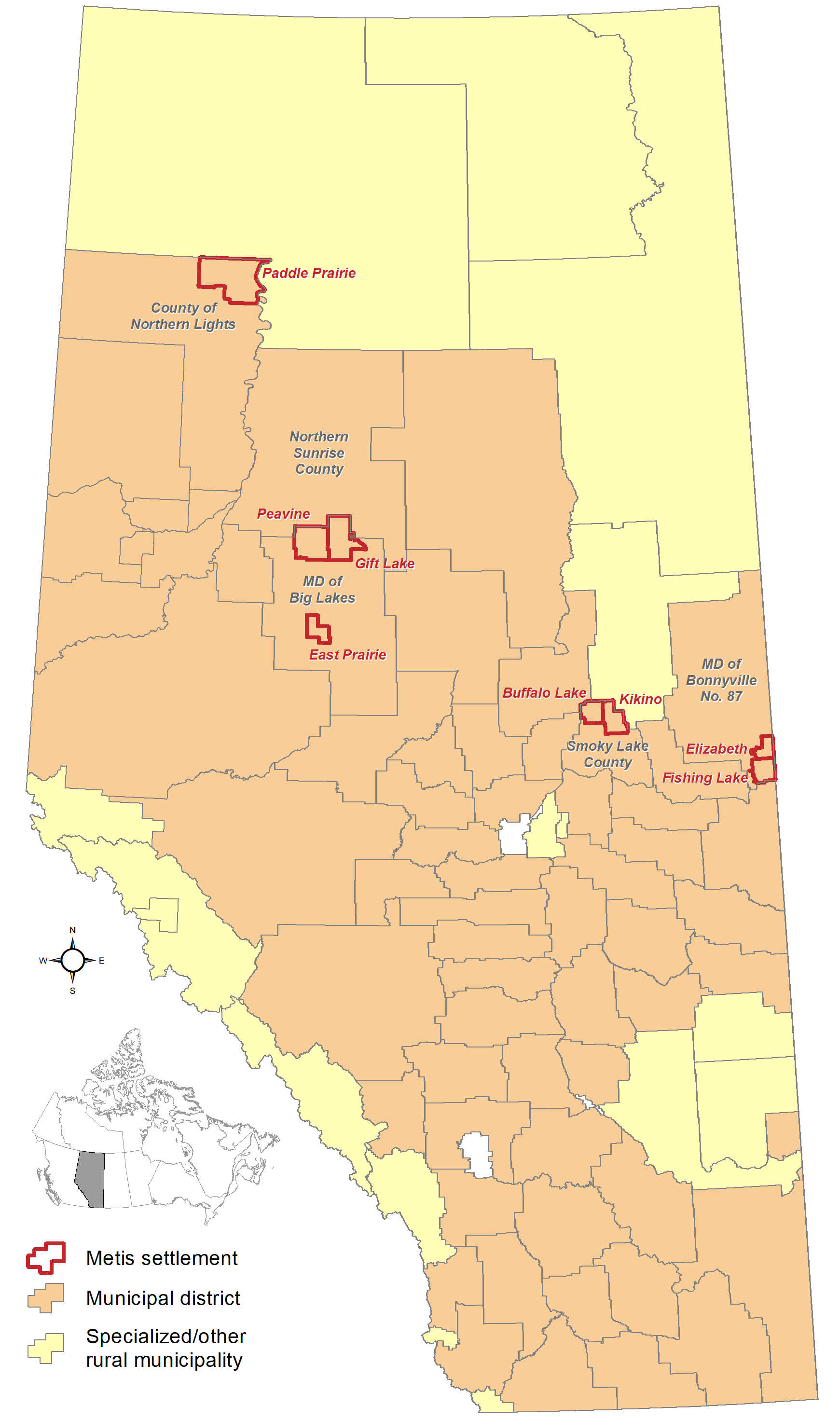
Distribution of Alberta's eight Metis settlements

List of Métis settlements in Alberta
Name	Municipal district or specialized municipality	2021 Census of Population				
Name	Municipal district or specialized municipality	Population (2021)	Population (2016)	Change (%)	Land area (km^{2})	Population density (/km^{2})
Buffalo Lake	Smoky Lake County	379	712	−46.8%	335.68	1.1
East Prairie	Big Lakes County	310	304	+2.0%	328.42	0.9
Elizabeth	MD of Bonnyville No. 87	594	653	−9.0%	246.45	2.4
Fishing Lake	MD of Bonnyville No. 87	414	446	−7.2%	348.64	1.2
Gift Lake (Note: Gift Lake comprises two parts. The majority is located within Big Lakes County, while the balance is located within Northern Sunrise County. The Big Lakes County portion (part "A") had a population of 625 living on 802.46 km^{2} (309.83 mi^{2}) in 2021, while the Northern Sunrise County portion (part "B") had a population of 0 living on 0.83 km^{2} (0.32 mi^{2}).)	Big Lakes County; Northern Sunrise County	625	658	−5.0%	803.29	0.8
Kikino (Note: Kikino comprises two parts. The majority is located within Smoky Lake County, while the balance is located within Lac La Biche County. The Smoky Lake County portion (part "A") had a population of 978 living on 440.92 km^{2} (170.24 mi^{2}) in 2021, while the Lac La Biche County portion (part "B") had a population of 0 living on 0.77 km^{2} (0.30 mi^{2}).)	Smoky Lake County; Lac La Biche County	978	934	+4.7%	441.69	2.2
Paddle Prairie	County of Northern Lights	551	544	+1.3%	1,726.45	0.3
Peavine	Big Lakes County	387	607	−36.2%	798.95	0.5
Total Métis settlements		4,238	4,858	−12.8%	5,029.57	0.8

== See also ==
- List of communities in Alberta
- List of designated places in Alberta
- List of Indian reserves in Alberta
- List of municipalities in Alberta
