= 2012 census =

2012 census may refer to:

- 2012 Alberta municipal censuses
- 2012 Bolivian census
- 2012 Tanzania census
- 2012 Zimbabwe census
