= Streamstown, Alberta =

Hamlet in Alberta, Canada

Streamstown
- Hamlet
- Location of Streamstown Streamstown (Canada)
- Coordinates: 53°25′39″N 110°10′45″W
- Country: Canada
- Province: Alberta
- Region: Central Alberta
- Census division: 10
- Municipal district: County of Vermilion River

Government
  - Type: Unincorporated
  - Governing body: County of Vermilion River Council

Population (2015)
  - Total: 20
- Time zone: UTC−06:00 (Alberta Time)
- Area codes: 780, 587, 825

Streamstown is a hamlet in central Alberta, Canada within the County of Vermilion River. It is located approximately 11 kilometres (6.8 mi) west of Highway 17 and 19 kilometres (12 mi) northwest of Lloydminster.

== Demographics ==
The population of Streamstown according to the 2015 municipal census conducted by the County of Vermilion River is 20.

== Attractions ==
The hamlet contains a hall for community events, a baseball diamond and a small park which housed a miniature model of the hamlet as it stood in 1945. The miniature model constructed by resident, Greg Davies (1939-2015) stood in the town from 2010 to 2016.

The Streamstown Cemetery, located just outside the hamlet, houses the grave of George Frederick Ives (1881–1993), the last surviving veteran of the Second Boer War.

== See also ==
- List of communities in Alberta
- List of hamlets in Alberta
