= 2015 Alberta municipal censuses =

- April 1 – June 30, 2015
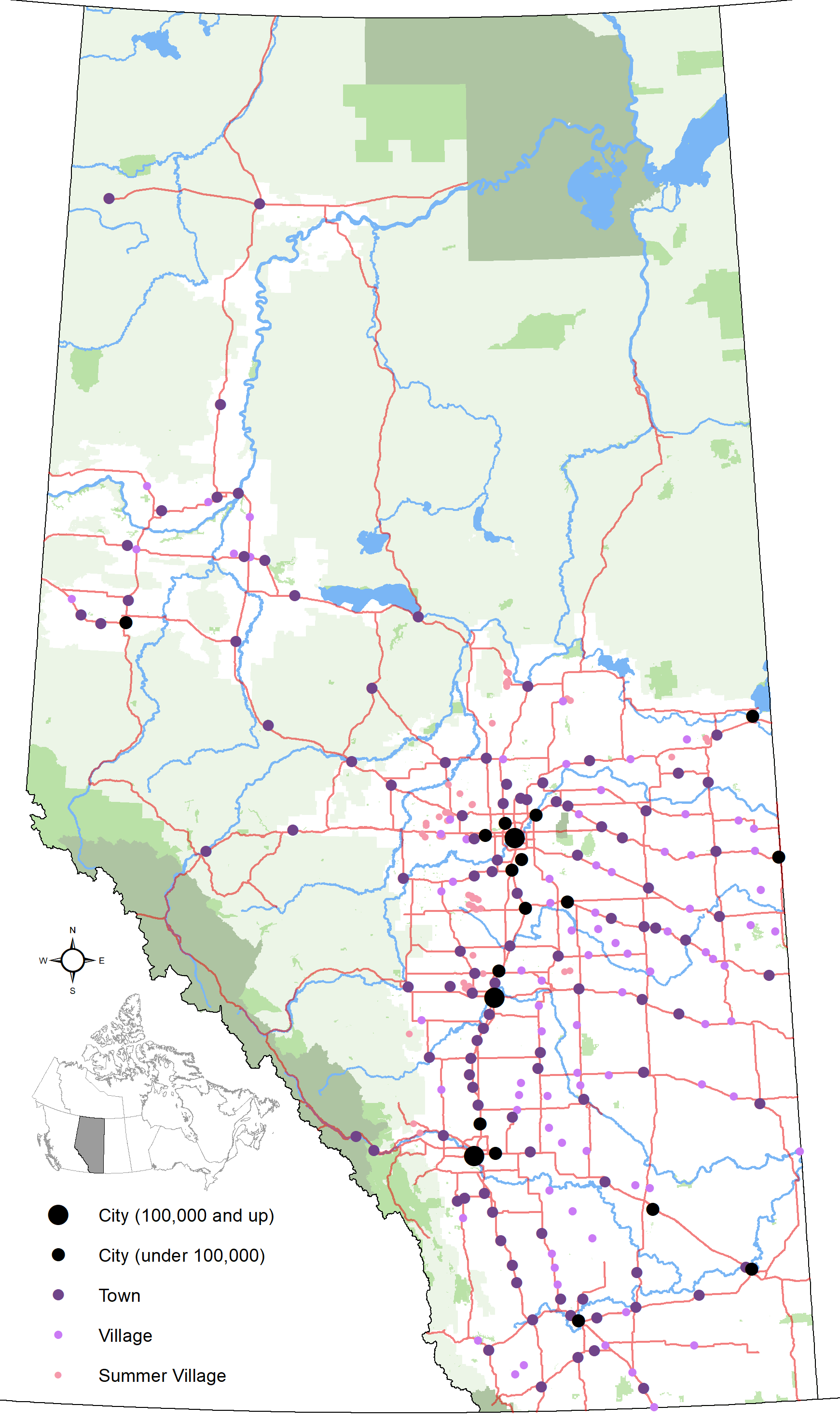
- Distribution of Alberta's 269 urban municipalities

Alberta has provincial legislation allowing its municipalities to conduct municipal censuses between April 1 and June 30 inclusive. Municipalities choose to conduct their own censuses for multiple reasons such as to better inform municipal service planning and provision, to capitalize on per capita based grant funding from higher levels of government, or to simply update their populations since the last federal census.

Alberta had 357 municipalities between April 1 and June 30, 2015, which marked the closure of the 2015 legislated municipal census period. This was reduced to 356 on July 1, 2015 when the former Village of Minburn dissolved to become a hamlet under the jurisdiction of the County of Minburn No. 27. At least 52 of these municipalities (14.6%) conducted a municipal census in 2015. Alberta Municipal Affairs recognized those conducted by 50 of these municipalities. By municipal status, it recognized those conducted by 12 of Alberta's 18 cities, 20 of 108 towns, 5 of 92 villages, 3 of 5 specialized municipalities, 2 of 64 municipal districts, and all 8 Metis settlements. (Note: No censuses were conducted among Alberta's 51 summer villages, 3 special areas and 8 improvement districts.) In addition to those recognized by Municipal Affairs, censuses were conducted by the villages of Kitscoty and Warburg.

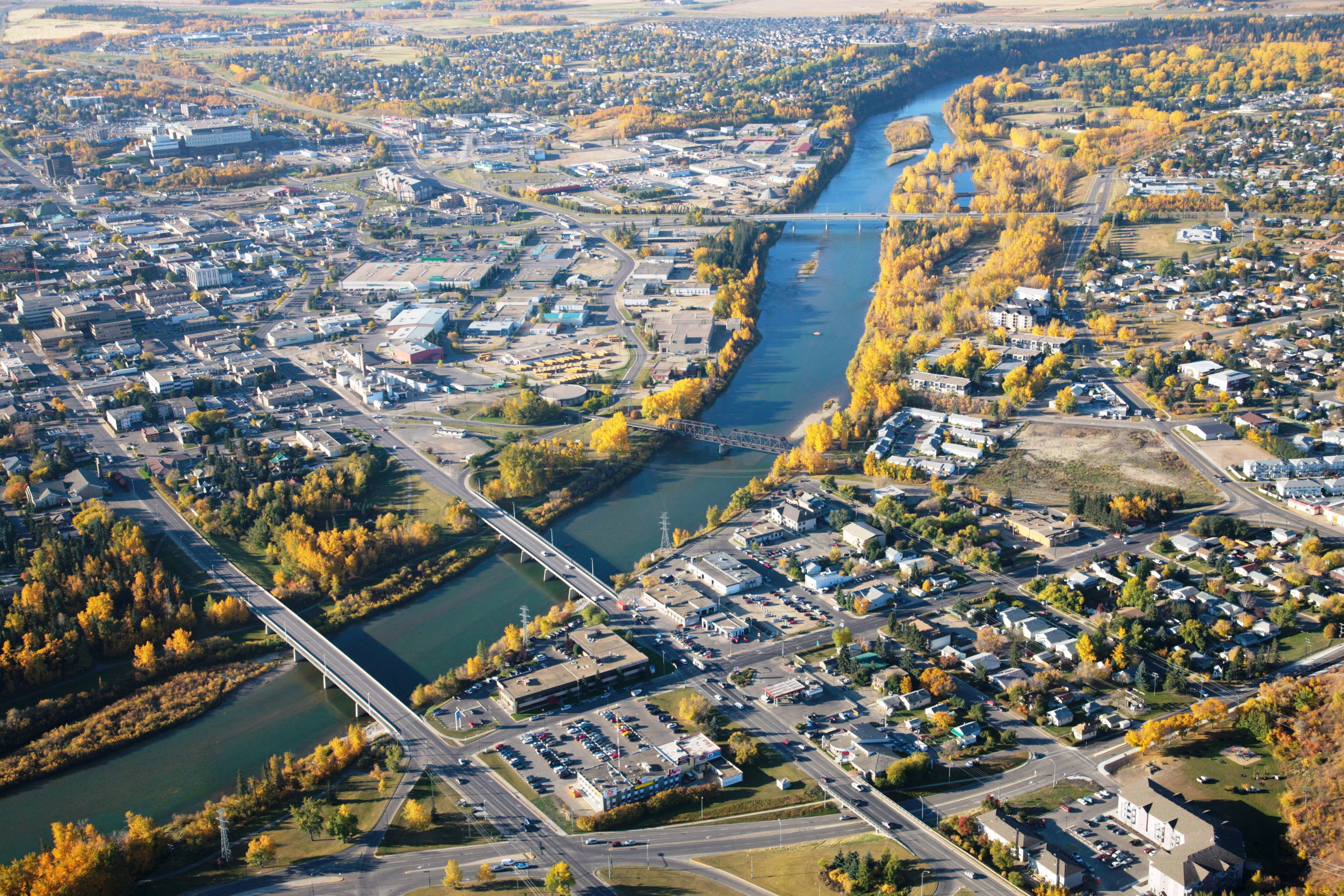
Red Deer's 2015 municipal census confirmed its population exceeded 100,000.

Some municipalities achieved population milestones as a result of their 2015 censuses. Red Deer became the third city in Alberta to exceed 100,000 residents, while Grande Prairie not only surpassed 60,000 people, but also overtook both St. Albert and Medicine Hat to become Alberta's fifth-largest city. Spruce Grove grew beyond the 30,000 mark, while both the Town of Blackfalds and the County of Vermilion River eclipsed 8,000. The Town of Westlock's population resurfaced above 5,000 after first doing so in 2006 but dropping back below in 2008. The Village of Thorsby surpassed 1,000, making it eligible to apply for town status.

== Municipal census results ==
The following summarizes the results of the numerous municipal censuses conducted in 2015.

2015 municipal census summary				2011 federal census comparison				Previous municipal census comparison			
Municipality	Status	Census date	2015 pop.	2011 pop.	Absolute growth	Absolute change	Annual growth rate	Prev. pop.	Prev. census year	Absolute growth	Annual growth rate
Airdrie	City	April 15, 2015	58,690	42,564	16,126	37.9%	8.4%	54,891	2014	3,799	6.9%
Barnwell	Village	June 1, 2015	960	771	189	24.5%	5.6%	812	2011	148	4.3%
Beaumont	Town	April 15, 2015	16,768	13,284	3,484	26.2%	6.0%	15,828	2014	940	5.9%
Big Valley	Village	May 11, 2015	347	364	−17	−4.7%	−1.2%	300	1991	47	0.6%
Blackfalds	Town	May 1, 2015	8,793	6,300	2,493	39.6%	8.7%	7,858	2014	935	11.9%
Brooks	City	May 1, 2015	14,185	13,676	509	3.7%	0.9%	13,581	2007	604	0.5%
Buffalo Lake	Metis settlement	May 24, 2015	676	492	184	37.4%	8.3%	701	2012	−25	−1.2%
Calgary	City	April 1, 2015	1,230,915	1,096,833	134,082	12.2%	2.9%	1,195,194	2014	35,721	3.0%
Chestermere	City	May 1, 2015	18,496	14,824	3,672	24.8%	5.7%	17,203	2014	1,293	7.5%
Coalhurst	Town	May 20, 2015	2,522	1,963	559	28.5%	6.5%	2,301	2013	221	4.7%
Cochrane	Town	April 10, 2015	23,084	17,580	5,504	31.3%	7.0%	20,708	2014	2,376	11.5%
East Prairie	Metis settlement	May 24, 2015	459	366	93	25.4%	5.8%	345	2012	114	10.0%
Elizabeth	Metis settlement	May 24, 2015	690	654	36	5.5%	1.3%	671	2012	19	0.9%
Elk Point	Town	April 17, 2015	1,646	1,412	234	16.6%	3.9%	1,571	2012	75	1.6%
Fishing Lake	Metis settlement	May 24, 2015	491	436	55	12.6%	3.0%	425	2012	66	4.9%
Fort Saskatchewan	City	April 20, 2015	24,040	19,051	4,989	26.2%	6.0%	22,808	2014	1,232	5.4%
Gift Lake	Metis settlement	May 24, 2015	651	662	−11	−1.7%	−0.4%	791	2012	−140	−6.3%
Grande Prairie	City	April 17, 2015	68,556	55,032	13,524	24.6%	5.6%	50,227	2007	18,329	4.0%
Hay Lakes	Village	June 4, 2015	492	425	67	15.8%	3.7%	429	2008	63	2.0%
High Level	Town	March 1, 2015	3,823	3,641	182	5%	1.2%	3,849	2004	−26	−0.1%
Innisfail	Town	May 4, 2015	7,953	7,876	77	1%	0.2%	7,922	2012	31	0.1%
Kikino	Metis settlement	May 24, 2015	918	964	−46	−4.8%	0.0%	810	2012	108	4.3%
Kitscoty	Village		(Note: The Village of Kitscoty began a municipal census but was "unable to complete it due to staffing and time constraints.")	846				967	2013		
Leduc	City	April 28, 2015	29,304	24,279	5,025	20.7%	4.8%	28,583	2014	721	2.5%
Lethbridge	City	April 1, 2015	94,804	83,517	11,287	13.5%	3.2%	93,004	2014	1,800	1.9%
Lloydminster	City	April 1, 2015	31,377	27,804	3,573	12.9%	3.1%	31,483	2013	−106	−0.2%
Mackenzie County	Specialized municipality	March 1, 2015	11,750	10,927	823	7.5%	1.8%	9,687	2003	2,063	1.6%
Magrath	Town	March 30, 2015	2,398	2,217	181	8.2%	2.0%	2,376	2013	22	0.5%
Medicine Hat	City	April 10, 2015	63,018	60,005	3,013	5%	1.2%	61,180	2012	1,838	1.0%
Milk River	Town	April 13, 2015	892	811	81	10%	2.4%	846	2007	46	0.7%
Okotoks	Town	May 6, 2015	28,016	24,511	3,505	14.3%	3.4%	27,331	2014	685	2.5%
MD of Opportunity No. 17	Municipal district	April 1, 2015	3,214	3,074	140	4.6%	1.1%	3,061	2013	153	2.5%
Oyen	Town	May 8, 2015	1,006	973	33	3.4%	0.8%	1,070	2012	−64	−2.0%
Paddle Prairie	Metis settlement	May 24, 2015	530	562	−32	−5.7%	−1.5%	464	2012	66	4.5%
Peavine	Metis settlement	May 24, 2015	639	690	−51	−7.4%	−1.9%	651	2012	−12	−0.6%
Rainbow Lake	Town	March 1, 2015	938	870	68	7.8%	1.9%	1,082	2007	−144	−1.8%
Raymond	Town	May 15, 2015	4,139	3,743	396	10.6%	2.5%	4,081	2014	58	1.4%
Red Deer	City	April 1, 2015	100,807	90,564	10,243	11.3%	2.7%	98,585	2014	2,222	2.3%
Rocky Mountain House	Town	April 1, 2015	7,220	6,933	287	4.1%	1.0%	7,300	2012	−80	−0.4%
Spruce Grove	City	April 8, 2015	32,036	26,171	5,865	22.4%	5.2%	29,526	2014	2,510	8.5%
Stirling	Village	May 11, 2015	1,215	1,090	125	11.5%	2.8%	1,147	2013	68	2.9%
Stony Plain	Town	April 1, 2015	16,127	15,051	1,076	7.1%	1.7%	14,177	2010	1,950	2.6%
Strathcona County	Specialized municipality	May 1, 2015	95,597	92,490	3,107	3.4%	0.8%	92,403	2012	3,194	1.1%
Strathmore	Town	April 15, 2015	13,327	12,305	1,022	8.3%	2.0%	12,352	2012	975	2.6%
Sylvan Lake	Town	April 14, 2015	14,310	12,327	1,983	16.1%	3.8%	13,015	2013	1,295	4.9%
Taber	Town	May 6, 2015	8,380	8,104	276	3.4%	0.8%	7,935	2011	445	1.4%
Thorsby	Village	April 19, 2015	1,025	951	74	7.8%	1.9%	947	2012	78	2.7%
Turner Valley	Town	May 15, 2015	2,511	2,167	344	15.9%	3.8%	2,022	2008	489	3.1%
County of Vermilion River	Municipal district	April 29, 2015	8,116	7,905	211	2.7%	0.7%	7,900	2008	216	0.4%
Warburg	Village			789				696	2009		
Westlock	Town	April 15, 2015	5,147	4,823	324	6.7%	1.6%	4,964	2008	183	0.5%
RM of Wood Buffalo	Specialized municipality	April 1, 2015	81,948	65,565	16,383	25%	5.7%	74,631	2012	7,317	3.2%

== Breakdowns ==
=== Lloydminster ===
The following is a breakdown of the results of the City of Lloydminster's 2015 municipal census by provincial component.

2015 municipal census summary			2011 federal census comparison					2013 municipal census comparison				
Provincial component	2015 pop.	Prov. percent	2011 pop.	Prov. percent	Absolute growth	Absolute change	Annual growth rate	2013 pop.	Prov. percent	Absolute growth	Absolute change	Annual growth rate
Alberta portion	19,740	63%	18,032	65%	1,708	9.5%	2.3%	20,011	64%	−271	−1.4%	−0.7%
Saskatchewan portion	11,637	37%	9,772	35%	1,865	19.1%	4.5%	11,472	36%	165	1.4%	0.7%
Total Lloydminster	31,377	100%	27,804	100%	3,573	12.9%	3.1%	31,483	100%	−106	−0.3%	−0.2%

=== Urban and rural service areas ===
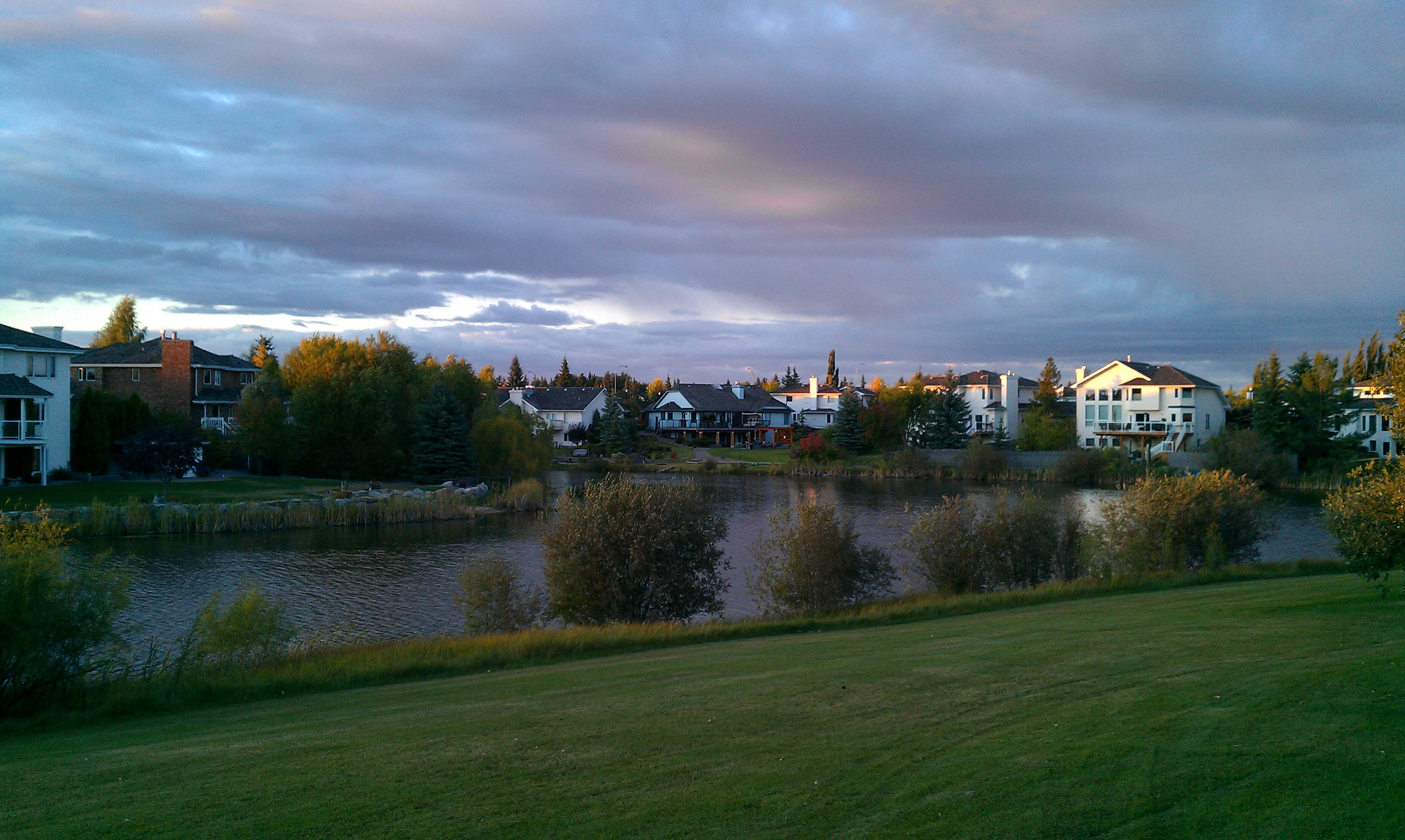
Sherwood Park is an urban service area within Strathcona County.

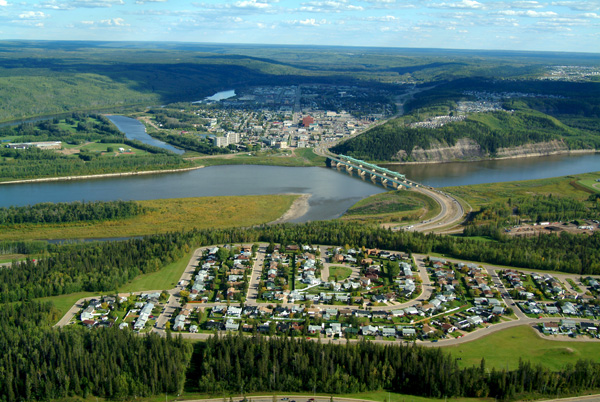
Fort McMurray is the Regional Municipality of Wood Buffalo's urban service area.

==== Strathcona County ====
2015 municipal census summary		2012 municipal census comparison		
Area	2015 population	Previous population	Absolute growth	Annual growth rate
Sherwood Park urban service area (Note: The Fort McMurray and Sherwood Park urban service areas are deemed equivalents of cities.)	68,782	65,465	3,317	1.7%
Rural service area (Note: Strathcona County's and the RM of Wood Buffalo's rural service areas are deemed equivalents of municipal districts.)	26,815	26,938	−123	−0.2%
Total Strathcona County	95,597	92,403	3,194	1.1%

==== Wood Buffalo ====
2015 municipal census summary		2012 municipal census comparison		
Area	2015 population	Previous population	Absolute growth	Annual growth rate
Fort McMurray urban service area	78,382	70,964	7,418	3.4%
Rural service area	3,566	3,667	−101	−0.9%
Total RM of Wood Buffalo	81,948	74,631	7,317	3.2%

=== Hamlets ===
The following is a list of hamlet populations determined by 2015 municipal censuses conducted by the County of Vermilion River, Strathcona County and the Regional Municipality (RM) of Wood Buffalo excluding the urban service areas of Fort McMurray and Sherwood Park that are presented above.

2015 municipal census summary			Previous census comparison			
Hamlet	Municipality	2015 population	Previous population	Previous census year	Absolute growth	Annual growth rate
Antler Lake	Strathcona County	469	353	2012	116	9.9%
Anzac	RM of Wood Buffalo	763	714	2012	49	2.2%
Ardrossan	Strathcona County	412	514	2012	−102	−7.1%
Blackfoot	County of Vermilion River	422	269	2011	151	11.1%
Clandonald	County of Vermilion River	107	109	2011	−2	−0.5%
Collingwood Cove	Strathcona County	360	362	2012	−2	−0.2%
Conklin	RM of Wood Buffalo	376	318	2012	58	5.7%
Fort Chipewyan	RM of Wood Buffalo	1,014	1,008	2012	6	0.2%
Fort MacKay	RM of Wood Buffalo	51	59	2012	−8	−4.7%
Gregoire Lake Estates	RM of Wood Buffalo	232	275	2012	−43	−5.5%
Half Moon Lake	Strathcona County	195	226	2012	−31	−4.8%
Hastings Lake	Strathcona County	87	92	2012	−5	−1.8%
Islay	County of Vermilion River	209	208	2011	1	0.1%
Janvier	RM of Wood Buffalo	155	171	2012	−16	−4.8%
Josephburg	Strathcona County	117	233	2012	−116	−20.5%
McLaughlin	County of Vermilion River	41				
North Cooking Lake	Strathcona County	59	66	2012	−7	−3.7%
Rivercourse	County of Vermilion River	16				
Saprae Creek	RM of Wood Buffalo	977	925	2012	52	1.8%
South Cooking Lake	Strathcona County	302	294	2012	8	0.9%
Streamstown	County of Vermilion River	20				
Tulliby Lake	County of Vermilion River	22				

== Shadow population counts ==
Alberta Municipal Affairs defines shadow population as "temporary residents of a municipality who are employed by an industrial or commercial establishment in the municipality for a minimum of 30 days within a municipal census year." The RM of Wood Buffalo conducted a shadow population count in 2015. The following presents the results of this count for comparison with its concurrent municipal census results.

Municipality	Status	Municipal census population	Shadow population	Combined population
RM of Wood Buffalo	Specialized municipality	81,948	43,084	125,032

== See also ==
- 2013 Alberta municipal elections
- Canada 2016 Census
- List of communities in Alberta
