= Faust, Alberta =

Faust
- Hamlet
- Location of Faust Faust (Canada)
- Coordinates: 55°18′57″N 115°37′39″W
- Country: Canada
- Province: Alberta
- Region: Northern Alberta
- Census division: 17
- Municipal district: Big Lakes County

Government
  - Type: Unincorporated
  - Governing body: Big Lakes County Council

Area (2021)
  - Land: 4.42 km^{2} (1.71 sq mi)

Population (2021)
  - Total: 282
  - Density: 63.7/km^{2} (165/sq mi)
- Time zone: UTC−06:00 (Alberta Time)
- Area codes: 780, 587, 825

Faust (/fɔːst/ FAWST) is a hamlet in northern Alberta within Big Lakes County, located 1 kilometre (0.62 mi) north of Highway 2, approximately 241 kilometres (150 mi) northwest of Edmonton (309 km by road).

The community has the name of E. T. Faust, a railroad officer.

== Demographics ==
Population history of Faust
Year	Pop.	±%
1941	421	—
1951	753	+78.9%
1956	344	−54.3%
1961	763	+121.8%
1966	535	−29.9%
1971	353	−34.0%
1976	298	−15.6%
1981	399	+33.9%
1986	344	−13.8%
1991	352	+2.3%
1991A	357	+1.4%
1996	343	−3.9%
2001	365	+6.4%
2006	317	−13.2%
2011	275	−13.2%
2016	261	−5.1%
2021	282	+8.0%
Source: Statistics Canada

In the 2021 Census of Population conducted by Statistics Canada, Faust had a population of 282 living in 133 of its 167 total private dwellings, a change of 8% from its 2016 population of 261. With a land area of 4.42 km^{2} (1.71 sq mi), it had a population density of 63.8/km^{2} (165.2/sq mi) in 2021.

As a designated place in the 2016 Census of Population conducted by Statistics Canada, Faust had a population of 261 living in 117 of its 152 total private dwellings, a change of −5.1% from its 2011 population of 275. With a land area of 4.59 km^{2} (1.77 sq mi), it had a population density of 56.9/km^{2} (147.3/sq mi) in 2016.

== See also ==
- List of communities in Alberta
- List of designated places in Alberta
- List of hamlets in Alberta
