= 2015 census =

2015 census may refer to:

- 2015 Alberta municipal censuses
- 2015 Philippines population census
