= Big Lakes County =

Municipal district in Alberta, Canada

- Municipal district

- Location within Alberta
- Country: Canada
- Province: Alberta
- Region: Northern Alberta
- Census division: 17
- Incorporated: 1995

Government
  - Reeve: Robert Nygaard
  - Governing body: Big Lakes County Council
  - Administrative office: High Prairie

Area (2021)
  - Land: 13,827.58 km^{2} (5,338.86 sq mi)

Population (2021)
  - Total: 4,986
  - Density: 0.4/km^{2} (1.0/sq mi)
- Time zone: UTC−06:00 (Alberta Time)
- Website: biglakescounty.ca

Big Lakes County, formerly the Municipal District of Big Lakes, is a municipal district in north-central Alberta, Canada.

It is located in Census Division 17, around the Lesser Slave Lake. Utikuma Lake and Winagami Lake are also located in the municipality.

== History ==
Big Lakes County was previously known as the Municipal District of Big Lakes prior to March 6, 2015.

== Geography ==
=== Communities and localities ===
The following urban municipalities are surrounded by Big Lakes County.

Cities

- none

Towns

- High Prairie
- Swan Hills

Villages

- none

Summer villages

- none

The following hamlets are located within Big Lakes County.

Hamlets

- Enilda
- Faust
- Grouard or Grouard Mission
- Joussard
- Kinuso

The following Métis settlements and Indian reserves are located within Big Lakes County.

Métis settlements

- East Prairie Métis Settlement
- Gift Lake Métis Settlement
- Peavine Métis Settlement

Indian reserves

- Drift Pile River
- Kapawe'no Freeman
- Halcro and Pakashan
- Sucker Creek
- Swan River

The following localities are located within Big Lakes County.

Localities

- Aggie
- Banana Belt
- Big Prairie
- Gilwood
- Heart River
- Heart River Settlement
- Improvement District No. 17
- Kenzie
- Leicester
- Lesser Slave Lake Settlement
- Nine Mile Point
- Prairie Echo
- Salt Prairie
- Salt Prairie Settlement
- Triangle

== Demographics ==
As a census subdivision in the 2021 Census of Population conducted by Statistics Canada, Big Lakes County had a population of 4,986 living in 2,007 of its 2,632 total private dwellings, a change of −11.4% from its 2016 population of 5,625. With a land area of 13,827.58 km^{2} (5,338.86 sq mi), it had a population density of 0.4/km^{2} (0.9/sq mi) in 2021.

As a census subdivision in the 2016 Census of Population conducted by Statistics Canada, Big Lakes County had a population of 5,672 living in 2,099 of its 2,728 total private dwellings, a −4.1% change from its 2011 population of 5,912. This includes the populations of three Métis settlements, East Prairie (304), Gift Lake (658) and Peavine (607), located within the census subdivision that are municipalities independent of Big Lakes County. With a land area of 13,942.43 km^{2} (5,383.20 sq mi), the census subdivision had a population density of 0.4/km^{2} (1.1/sq mi) in 2016. Excluding the three Metis settlements, Big Lakes County had a population of 4,103 in 2016, a change of −16.5% from its 2011 population of 4,914.

Big Lakes County's 2013 municipal census counted a population of 3,861, a −7.7% change from its 2002 municipal census population of 4,181.

=== Visible minorities and Aboriginals ===
Big Lakes had the most Métis people per capita of any Canadian census subdivision in 2006 with a population of 5,000 or more due to the census' inclusion of the population of the three Métis settlement municipalities within Big Lakes' totals.

Visible minority and Aboriginal population (Canada 2006 Census)
| Population group | | Population | % of total population |
|---|---|---|---|
| White | | 2,815 | 48.5% |
| Visible minority group Source: | South Asian | 20 | 0.3% |
| Visible minority group Source: | Chinese | 10 | 0.2% |
| Visible minority group Source: | Black | 0 | 0% |
| Visible minority group Source: | Filipino | 0 | 0% |
| Visible minority group Source: | Latin American | 0 | 0% |
| Visible minority group Source: | Arab | 0 | 0% |
| Visible minority group Source: | Southeast Asian | 0 | 0% |
| Visible minority group Source: | West Asian | 0 | 0% |
| Visible minority group Source: | Korean | 10 | 0.2% |
| Visible minority group Source: | Japanese | 0 | 0% |
| Visible minority group Source: | Visible minority, n.i.e. | 0 | 0% |
| Visible minority group Source: | Multiple visible minority | 10 | 0.2% |
| Total visible minority population | | 60 | 1% |
| Aboriginal group Source: | First Nations | 845 | 14.6% |
| Aboriginal group Source: | Métis | 2,030 | 35% |
| Aboriginal group Source: | Inuit | 0 | 0% |
| Aboriginal group Source: | Aboriginal, n.i.e. | 25 | 0.4% |
| Aboriginal group Source: | Multiple Aboriginal identity | 30 | 0.5% |
| Total Aboriginal population | | 2,930 | 50.5% |
| Total population | | 5,805 | 100% |

== Education ==
Southeastern parts of the district are within Pembina Hills Public Schools, which formed in 1995 as a merger of three school districts.

== See also ==
- List of communities in Alberta
- List of francophone communities in Alberta
- List of municipal districts in Alberta
