= Sputinow, Alberta =

Locality in Alberta, Canada

Coordinates: 53°55′17″N 110°16′02″W

Location of Sputinow, Alberta

Sputinow is a locality in the Canadian province of Alberta, located in the Municipal District of Bonnyville No. 87. It is home to most of the community facilities of Fishing Lake Metis Settlement.

== See also ==
- List of localities in Alberta
