= CKVH-FM =

Radio station in High Prairie, Alberta

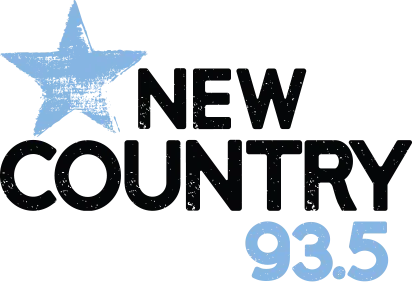
- High Prairie, Alberta; Canada
- Frequency: 93.5 MHz
- Branding: New Country 93.5 FM

Programming
- Format: Country

Ownership
- Owner: Stingray Digital; (3937844 Canada Inc.)

History
- First air date: 1990
- Call sign meaning: Village of High Prairie (town of licence)

Technical information
- Class: B1
- ERP: 25 kW
- HAAT: 58.2 metres (191 ft)
- Transmitter coordinates: 55.431°N 116.491°W

Links
- Website: New Country 93.5 FM

CKVH-FM is a Canadian radio station that broadcasts a country music format at 93.5 FM in High Prairie, Alberta. The station is branded as New Country 93.5 FM and was owned by Newcap Radio before they were bought out by Stingray Digital.

== History ==
After being given CRTC approval in 1989, the station signed on in 1990 as a part of the Nor-Net Communications radio network, that operated stations throughout Alberta and Northern BC.

In September 2006, CKVH-AM switched from country (Cat Country) to classic hits (The Fox).

On 21 April 2009, Newcap Radio received CRTC approval to convert CKVH from 1020 AM to 93.5 FM. The FM switchover took effect on 15 October 2010.

On 15 October 2010, CKVH converted to the FM dial and became known as 93.5 Prairie FM. On 2 May 2014, CKVH-FM changed its format back to country but kept the Prairie FM brand.

In November 2016, CKVH rebranded under the Real Country brand, as with other Newcap-owned country stations in Alberta.

On March 4, 2024, CKVH rebranded once again, this time to Stingray's New Country brand.

== Past station logos ==
Real Country 93.5 Logo 2016–2024.
