= Marlboro, Alberta =

Marlboro
- Hamlet
- Location within Yellowhead County Location within Alberta
- Coordinates: 53°33′20″N 116°47′46″W
- Country: Canada
- Province: Alberta
- Census division: 14
- Municipal district: Yellowhead County
- Founded: 1913

Government
  - Mayor: Jim Eglinski
  - Governing body: Yellowhead County Council: Shawn Brian Berry; Sandra Cherniawsky; Anthony Giezen; Dawn Mitchell; Fred Priestley-Wright; David Russell; William Velichko; Jack Williams

Area (2021)
  - Land: 0.29 km^{2} (0.11 sq mi)

Population (2021)
  - Total: 97
  - Density: 333.8/km^{2} (865/sq mi)
- Time zone: UTC−06:00 (Alberta Time)
- Area codes: 780, 587, 825

Marlboro is a hamlet in west-central Alberta, Canada within Yellowhead County. It is located on the Yellowhead Highway (Highway 16), approximately 25 kilometres (16 mi) west of Edson. Sundance Provincial Park is located northwest of the hamlet.

Statistics Canada recognizes Marlboro as a designated place.

== Demographics ==
Population history of Marlboro
Year	Pop.	±%
1941	195	—
1951	135	−30.8%
1956	301	+123.0%
1961	289	−4.0%
1966	191	−33.9%
1971	156	−18.3%
1976	165	+5.8%
1981	211	+27.9%
1986	183	−13.3%
1991	186	+1.6%
1991A	187	+0.5%
1996	175	−6.4%
2001	160	−8.6%
2006	156	−2.5%
2011	80	−48.7%
2016	90	+12.5%
2016R	114	+26.7%
2021	97	−14.9%
Source: Statistics Canada

In the 2021 Census of Population conducted by Statistics Canada, Marlboro had a population of 97 living in 38 of its 43 total private dwellings, a change of −14.9% from its 2016 population of 114. With a land area of 0.29 km^{2} (0.11 sq mi), it had a population density of 334.5/km^{2} (866.3/sq mi) in 2021.

As a designated place in the 2016 Census of Population conducted by Statistics Canada, Marlboro had a population of 90 living in 34 of its 40 total private dwellings, a change of 12.5% from its 2011 population of 80. With a land area of 0.38 km^{2} (0.15 sq mi), it had a population density of 236.8/km^{2} (613.4/sq mi) in 2016.

== See also ==
- List of communities in Alberta
- List of designated places in Alberta
- List of hamlets in Alberta
