= Rupertsland Institute =

Métis-led, not-for-profit organization

- Founded: 2010
- Type: Métis not-for-profit organization
- Headquarters: Edmonton, Alberta
- Services: Education; employment and training; research
- Website: www.rupertsland.org

The Rupertsland Institute is a Métis-led, not-for-profit organization affiliated with the Otipemisiwak Métis Government. Established in 2010, it supports the well-being and self-sufficiency of Métis people in Alberta through education, employment training, and research.

== Rupertsland Centre for Métis Research ==
In 2011, the institute helped establish the Rupertsland Centre for Métis Research at the University of Alberta. The centre focuses on academic research concerning Métis people, rights, history, and policy.

== Katimavik Pilot Project ==
In 2014, the Institute partnered with Katimavik on a five-month volunteer Métis youth transitional program in Peterborough, Ontario.
