= High Prairie =

- Town
- Town of High Prairie
- Motto: Gateway to the Peace Country
- Location in Big Lakes County

- Location of High Prairie in Alberta High Prairie (Canada)
- Coordinates: 55°25′57″N 116°29′10″W
- Country: Canada
- Province: Alberta
- Region: Northern Alberta
- Planning region: Upper Athabasca
- Municipal district: Big Lakes County
- Incorporated
  - Village: April 6, 1945
  - Town: January 10, 1950

Government
  - Mayor: Daniel Vandermeulen
  - Governing body: High Prairie Town Council

Area (2021)
  - Land: 7.01 km^{2} (2.71 sq mi)
- Elevation: 595 m (1,952 ft)

Population (2021)
  - Total: 2,380
  - Density: 339.5/km^{2} (879/sq mi)
- Time zone: UTC−06:00 (Alberta Time)
- Postal code span: T0G 1E0
- Area codes: 780, 587, 825
- Highways: Highway 2 Highway 749
- Website: www.highprairie.ca

High Prairie is a town in northern Alberta, Canada within Big Lakes County. It is located at the junction of Highway 2 and Highway 749, approximately 89 km (55 mi) northeast of Valleyview and 118 km (73 mi) west of Slave Lake.

== History ==
The name describes the nature of the surrounding countryside. A post office opened in 1910. Its early name was Prairie River. In 1914, the alignment of the Edmonton, Dunvegan and British Columbia Railway, later known as the Northern Alberta Railway, was chosen to go through High Prairie instead of Grouard to the northeast. As a result, many residents and businesses from Grouard relocated to High Prairie once the Edmonton, Dunvegan and British Columbia Railway was built.

With an estimated population of 600 people, High Prairie was incorporated as a village on April 6, 1945 and subsequently as a town on January 10, 1950.

== Demographics ==
Federal census population history
Year	Pop.	±%
1946	643	—
1951	1,141	+77.4%
1956	1,743	+52.8%
1961	1,756	+0.7%
1966	2,241	+27.6%
1971	2,354	+5.0%
1976	2,281	−3.1%
1981	2,506	+9.9%
1986	2,817	+12.4%
1991	2,932	+4.1%
1996	2,907	−0.9%
2001	2,737	−5.8%
2006	2,750	+0.5%
2011	2,600	−5.5%
2016	2,564	−1.4%
Source: Statistics Canada

In the 2021 Census of Population conducted by Statistics Canada, the Town of High Prairie had a population of 2,380 living in 941 of its 1,119 total private dwellings, a change of −7.2% from its 2016 population of 2,564. With a land area of 7.01 km^{2} (2.71 sq mi), it had a population density of 339.5/km^{2} (879.3/sq mi) in 2021.

In the 2016 Census of Population conducted by Statistics Canada, the Town of High Prairie recorded a population of 2,564 living in 949 of its 1,116 total private dwellings, a −1.4% change from its 2011 population of 2,600. With a land area of 7.22 km^{2} (2.79 sq mi), it had a population density of 355.1/km^{2} (919.8/sq mi) in 2016.

== Economy ==
High Prairie's main industries include agriculture, forestry, oil and gas, and service industry.

One of its main employers is the Tolko OSB Mill that was built in 1994, The plant was closed in 2008 due to the economic downturn. In 2018 the mill was reopened and now employs 174 people. West Fraser Mills purchased the Buchanan lumber mill in 2014 and is another main employer for High Prairie with 150 employees.

== Attractions ==
Due to its proximity to the western shores of Lesser Slave Lake, High Prairie has a thriving tourism industry, particularly in the warmer summer months. There are many attractions at the lake, including events such as the Golden Walleye Classic.

Winagami Lake Provincial Park, approximately 12 kilometres (7.5 mi) to the north of High Prairie, and Kimiwan Lake, approximately 49 kilometres (30 mi) to the northwest, are attractions for bird-watching enthusiasts. Winagami Lake and Kimiwan Lake are within the general area where three major migration paths meet – the Central Flyway, the Mississippi Flyway, and the Pacific Flyway.

== Government ==
High Prairie is governed by a town council, a mayor and six council members, each of whom serve four-year terms. Federally, it is part of the Fort McMurray—Athabasca electoral district. In the next federal election, it will become part of the newly formed riding of Peace River—Westlock.

== Medical services ==
The High Prairie Community Health and Wellness Clinic, which is run by Alberta Health Services (AHS), was established to replace the Associate Medical Clinic in 2014. The Community Health and Wellness Clinic, which is family-focused and includes primary care services, has a collaborative, inter-professional healthcare team, that responds to the higher incidents of patients with chronic conditions, such as diabetes, high blood pressure, and breathing disorders in High Prairie, according to AHS. The Clinic has chronic disease management nurses and nurse practitioners (NPs), as well as physicians.

== Media ==
Media outlets serving High Prairie and surrounding area include CKVH The Fox, CIRE-TV (the local community channel), and the South Peace News, a local community newspaper.

== Notable people ==
- Tom Lysiak, former professional hockey player
- Randy Ragan, former professional soccer player
- Larry Shaben, Canada's first Muslim Cabinet Minister
- Cheyanne Turions, curator, artist, writer

== Recognition ==
In 2001, High Prairie was recognized for its state-of-the-art water treatment system and it was awarded 4 'blooms' by Communities in Bloom, a non-profit organization that encourages environmental responsibility and beautification in Canadian communities.

== In popular culture ==
The news satire program This Is That had an episode in which they discussed a (fictional) attempt by High Prairie to attract tourism by inventing a fake accent.

== See also ==
- List of communities in Alberta
- List of francophone communities in Alberta
- List of towns in Alberta
