= Area code 780 =

Telephone area code for central and northern Alberta

Coordinates: 55.035°N 114.968°W

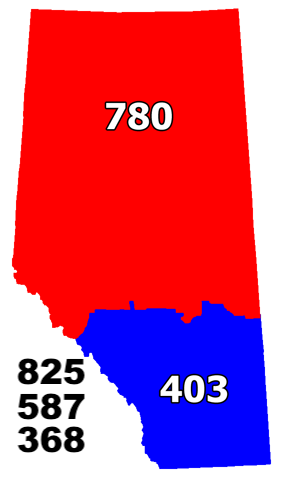
Alberta's numbering plan areas and area codes

Area code 780 is a telephone area code in the North American Numbering Plan (NANP) for the northern two-thirds of the Canadian province of Alberta, including the Edmonton area. The area code was established in 1999 in a split of area code 403, which had served the entire province since the establishment of the original North American area codes in 1947. The numbering plan area is also served by area codes 587, 825, and 368, which form a complex overlay for all of Alberta.

== History ==
When in 1947, the American Telephone and Telegraph Company (AT&T) announced plans for organizing the telephone networks of North American into a unified continental telephone numbering plan, Alberta was recognized as a single numbering plan area (NPA), receiving area code 403, as one of the original eighty-six area codes. In addition to the province, this included also the Yukon, and the western half of the Northwest Territories. It was the second-largest numbering plan area in the system and spanned more than one ninth of the circumference of the planet, from the 49th parallel north to the North Pole. On October 3, 1997, the numbering plan area was reduced to just the province of Alberta, and the Canadian territories were split off with the new area code 867.

Within only a year, area code 403 was threatened by exhaustion because of the rapid growth of telecommunication services demand for pagers, cellphones, and computer modems, as well as growing competition among providers.

For mitigating the threat of exhaustion, the northern two thirds of Alberta, including Edmonton, was split from 403 on January 25, 1999, receiving the new area code 780. Generally, everything from Red Deer, Lacombe, and Ponoka southward stayed in 403. Permissive dialing of 403 continued across the province until May 18, 1999. Area code 780 started use on January 25, 1999. Generally, everything north and west of Ponoka switched to 780. Permissive dialing of 403 continued throughout Alberta until May 18, 1999. Area code 780 is also the last new area code in Canada to be introduced by a split.

Within a decade, area code 780 was close to exhaustion once again, along with area 403 in the south. The solution for mitigation was to implement a complex overlay for the entire province, extending over both numbering plan areas, with the new area code 587. Optional ten-digit dialing began on June 23, 2008 and became mandatory on September 12, 2008. On September 20, 2008, Telus Mobility began to assign 587 telephone numbers to new customers in Calgary and Edmonton.

On April 9, 2016, all three numbering plan areas of the province were overlaid with an additional area code, 825.

On January 21, 2022, the province was once again overlaid with another area code, 368.

== Local exchange carriers ==
The incumbent local exchange carrier in area code 780 is Telus. Until its merger with Telus in 1995, over three years prior to the startup of 780, the municipally owned Edmonton Telephones (Ed Tel) served as an ILEC.

== Service area and central office prefixes ==
- Ardrossan (780)-922
- Ashmont (780)-726
- Barrhead (780)-282 284 294 305 674
- Beaumont (780)-737 929
- Bon Accord (780)-921
- Bonnyville (780)-201 207 343 545 573 687 812 813 815 826
- Breton (780)-696
- Bruderheim (780)-796
- Camrose (780)-226 281 563 608 672 673 678 679 781
- Clyde (780)-348
- Cold Lake (780)-594 639 654 840
- Derwent (780)-741
- Devon (780)-738 987
- Donnelly (780)-925
- Drayton Valley (780)-202 234 241 514 515 542 621 898
- Eaglesham (780)-359
- Edmonton (780)-200 203 217 218 220 221 222 224 229 231 232 233 235 236 237 238 239 240 242 243 244 245 246 248 250 257 263 264 265 266 267 270 271 278 288 289 292 293 297 298 299 318 328 340 341 342 371 377 378 391 392 394 395 399 401 405 406 407 408 409 412 413 414 415 420 421 422 423 424 425 426 427 428 429 430 431 432 433 434 435 436 437 438 439 440 441 442 443 444 445 446 447 448 450 451 452 453 454 455 456 457 461 462 463 465 466 468 469 471 472 473 474 475 476 477 478 479 480 481 482 483 484 485 486 487 488 489 490 491 492 493 495 496 497 498 499 500 503 504 508 509 530 540 554 566 577 604 613 616 619 628 633 634 637 638 641 642 643 644 652 660 664 665 666 667 668 669 670 680 686 690 691 695 699 700 701 702 705 707 708 709 710 716 717 718 719 720 721 722 729 732 733 735 752 756 757 758 760 761 777 782 784 800 801 802 803 807 809 818 819 822 850 860 862 863 868 884 885 886 887 893 901 902 903 904 905 906 907 908 909 910 913 914 915 916 917 918 919 920 930 932 934 935 937 938 940 944 945 951 952 953 964 965 966 969 970 974 975 976 977 982 983 984 988 989 990 991 993 994 995 996 999
- Edson (780)-225 280 517 556 600 712 723 725 728
- Edgerton (780)-755
- Evansburg (780)-727
- Fairview (780)-330 772 834 835
- Falher (780)-837
- Fort McMurray (780)-215 370 381 531 588 598 607 713 714 715 734 742 743 747 748 749 750 762 788 790 791 792 793 799 804 838 880 881 972
- Fort Saskatchewan (780)-589 912 936 992 997 998
- Fort Vermilion (780)-927
- Fox Creek (780)-622
- Gift Lake (780)-767
- Grande Cache (780)-320 501 783 827
- Grande Prairie (780)-228 230 296 357 380 402 505 512 513 518 532 533 538 539 605 653 814 830 831 832 833 876 882 897 933 978
- Grouard (780)-751
- Hairy Hill (780)-768
- High Level (780)-247 285 502 730 821 841 926
- High Prairie (780)-291 316 507 523 536
- Hinton (780)-223 315 740 816 817 865
- Irma (780)-754
- Islay (780)-744
- Jasper (780)-317 820 852 866 883 931
- Jean D'or Prairie (780)-759
- Joussard (780)-776
- Kinuso (780)-775
- La Crete (780)-928
- Leduc (780)-599 612 739 769 900 980 986
- Legal (780)-961
- Mannville (780)-763
- Mayerthorpe (780)-786
- McLennan (780)-324
- Morinville (780)-572 939
- Mundare (780)-764
- Nisku (780)-770
- Niton Junction (780)-795
- Paddle Prairie Metis Settlement (780)-981
- Paradise Valley (780)-745
- Peace River (780)-219 274 527 561 617 618 624 625 859
- Plamondon (780)-798
- Radway (780)-736
- Rainbow Lake (780)-956
- Robb (780)-794
- Rycroft (780)-765
- Sangudo (780)-785
- Seba Beach (780)-797
- Sherwood Park (780)-400 410 416 417 449 464 467 570 601 630 640
- Silver Valley (780)-351
- Slave Lake (780)-260 516 529 805 843 849
- Spruce Grove (780)-571 946 948 960 962
- St. Albert (780)-347 418 419 458 459 460 470 544 569 590 602 651 671
- St. Paul (780)-210, 290, 614, 615, 645, 646
- Stony Plain (780)-569 591 823 963 968
- Thorsby (780)-789
- Valleyview (780)-255 300 301 524 552 558
- Vegreville (780)-208 275 543 603 606 631 632
- Vermilion (780)-581, 853
- Wabasca (780)-773
- Wainwright (780)-261 703 842 845
- Wandering River (780)-771
- Warburg (780)-848
- Wembley (780)-766
- Westlock (780)-206 283 287 307 349 562
- Wetaskiwin (780)-312 335 352 360 361 362 364 368 839
- Whitecourt (780)-262 268 286 396 706 746 778 779
- Wildwood (780)-325
- West Lloydminster (780)-205 214 522 677 808 861 870 871 872 874 875
- Woking (780)-774

== See also ==
- List of Alberta area codes
- List of North American Numbering Plan area codes

Alberta area codes: 403, 587/825/368, 780
	North: 867	
West: 250/778/236/672	780/368/587/825	East: 306/639
	South: 403/368/587/825	
British Columbia area codes: 250, 604, 236/257/672/778
Saskatchewan area codes: 306/639/474
Yukon, Northwest Territories and Nunavut area codes: 867
