= Improvement District No. 349 =

- Former improvement district
- Location within Alberta
- Coordinates: 55°5′N 110°40′W
- Country: Canada
- Province: Alberta
- Region: Northern Alberta
- Established: January 1, 2012
- Dissolved: May 1, 2021

Area (2021)
  - Land: 5,626.57 km^{2} (2,172.43 sq mi)

Population (2021)
  - Total: 15
  - Density: 0/km^{2} (0/sq mi)
- Time zone: UTC−06:00 (Alberta Time)
- Highway: 881

Improvement District No. 349 was an improvement district in northeast Alberta, Canada that existed between January 1, 2012 and May 1, 2021. The improvement district was largely coextensive with the Alberta portion of the Cold Lake Air Weapons Range. On May 1, 2021, the improvement district was annexed by the adjacent Municipal District (MD) of Bonnyville No. 87.

== History ==
Improvement District (ID) No. 349 was established through the approval of Order in Council 419/2011 passed by Alberta's Lieutenant Governor in Council on September 9, 2011. It was created from lands that were separated from the Regional Municipality of Wood Buffalo and Lac La Biche County (the Alberta portion of the Cold Lake Air Weapons Range). The effective date of the improvement district's formation was January 1, 2012.

ID No. 349 was formed as a result of negotiations between the Province of Alberta, the City of Cold Lake, the MD of Bonnyville No. 87, the Regional Municipality of Wood Buffalo, and Lac La Biche County. Under a tax revenue sharing agreement, the City of Cold Lake received a portion of the tax revenue generated by oil and gas activity on the air weapons range in 2012. The revenue made the city more sustainable, offsetting its costs to provide infrastructure and services to support the military base located within the city.

As partial compensation for losing 11,600 km^{2} (4,500 mi^{2}) of land, Lac La Biche County received 1,500 km^{2} (580 mi^{2}) of land from the Regional Municipality of Wood Buffalo south of the Conklin area and north of the air weapons range. It also received a portion of the tax revenue generated by oil and gas activity on the air weapons range from the City of Cold Lake and received funding assistance from the provincial government.

As compensation to Wood Buffalo for the loss of jurisdiction over lands to Lac La Biche County and the new improvement district, the municipality received control over Crown land within its jurisdiction to accommodate future residential, commercial, and industrial growth. The transfer of control provided enough land for approximately 200,000 additional residents.

After over nine years as a municipality, ID No. 349 dissolved by way of being annexed by the MD of Bonnyville No. 87 on May 1, 2021.

== Demographics ==
In the 2021 Census of Population conducted by Statistics Canada, Improvement District No. 349 had a population of 15 living in 7 of its 7 total private dwellings, an increase from its 2016 population of 0. With a land area of 5,626.57 km^{2} (2,172.43 sq mi), it had a population density of 0.0/km^{2} (0.0/sq mi) in 2021.

In the 2016 Census of Population conducted by Statistics Canada, Improvement District No. 349 had a population of 0 living in 0 of its 0 total private dwellings, which represents no change from its 2011 population of 0. With a land area of 5,639.63 km^{2} (2,177.47 sq mi), it had a population density of 0.0/km^{2} (0.0/sq mi) in 2016.

== See also ==
- CFB Cold Lake
- List of communities in Alberta
