= Alberta Township System =

The Alberta Township System (ATS) is a land surveying system used in the Canadian province of Alberta and other parts of western Canada.

== History and background ==
In principle there is a mathematical basis for the Alberta Township System (ATS) variant of the Dominion Land Survey (DLS) system as implemented in Canada. The implementation in western Canada reflects a number of slightly different approaches, as well as a large number of errors.

Long before the Dominion Land Surveyor (DLS) first came into official existence in 1872, licensed surveyors known as provincial land surveyors had been functioning in the provinces of Ontario and Quebec (then called Canada West and Canada East) under an Act of 1849. Establishing a system of examination for new aspirants to the title of "Dominion Land Surveyor" was officially adopted in 1874. In 1910 The Alberta Surveyors Act prescribed the system and the methods whereby land surveys were to be carried out under the general purview of a provincial director of surveys whose responsibility it was to see that all survey work was performed in accordance with the provisions of that Act.

The system is also used by provincial governments when selling exploration rights, and oil and gas wells are referenced by their location as defined within the Alberta Township System.

== How it works ==
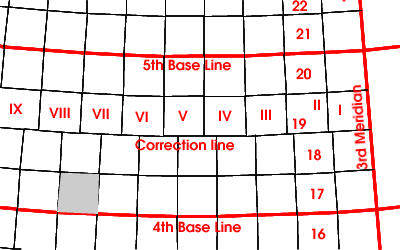
Townships in relation with meridians, baselines and correction lines

Below is a brief description of how to lay out the DLS grid for Alberta.

Lay off 6-mile-3-chain (9.7 km) ticks from the 49th parallel of latitude to the 60th parallel. This gives 127 township lines.

The 49th parallel of latitude is the first base line of the ATS system. On it lay off 6-mile-6-chain (9.8 km) ticks westwards starting at the 110th line of longitude (4th DLS meridian). Start over at the 114th and 118th lines of longitude (5th and 6th DLS meridians). Extend these ticks 12 miles 6 chains (19.4 km) due north (following a line of constant longitude) to the first correction line. This gets you your first set of range lines.

Starting at the 49th parallel (first base line) go 24 miles 12 chains (38.9 km) directly north. This gets you to the second base line. At the latitude corresponding to this distance from the 49th parallel lay off 6-mile-6-chain ticks westwards from 110th meridian as you did at the 1st base line. The circumference of the earth has decreased as you went northwards, so there will be fewer full ticks than there were one base line south. Extend 12 miles 6 chains north and 12 miles 6 chains south from these ticks. This gets you your next set of range lines. You will note there is an offset between the range lines extending north from the lower base line and those extending south from the current ones. This offset occurs along what is called a correction line.

Repeat the base line process every 24 miles 12 chains northwards (to the 32nd).

All this will result in a mesh of cells nominally six miles (plus 3 or 6 chains for road allowances) on a side. Each such cell is called a township (not to be confused with the township lines laid off earlier). Subdivide the township into 36 sections by laying off ticks of one-sixth of each township side and connecting them by north–south and east–west lines. The sections are numbered boustrophedonically starting from the southeast corner of the township.

Sections can be similarly subdivided into quarters by placing and connecting ticks at the halfway point on each section side. Use the same process to subdivide sections into legal subdivisions (LSD) except place the tick at the one-quarter waypoints. LSDs are numbered boustrophedonically starting at the southeast corner of the section.

While the ATS format is proprietary, online conversion tools have been developed.

- Alberta Geological Survey converts the system to geographical coordinates

== See also ==
- List of settlements in Alberta
