= Fishing Lake Metis Settlement =

Fishing Lake Metis Settlement Packechawanis (Cree)
- Métis settlement
- Motto(s): "Our Land, Our Culture, Our People, Our Future"
- Location in M.D. of Bonnyville

- Location in Alberta
- Coordinates: 53°59′N 110°10′W
- Country: Canada
- Province: Alberta
- Region: Northern Alberta
- Planning region: Lower Athabasca
- Municipal district: Bonnyville No. 87

Government
  - Chair: Wayne Daniels
  - Self-Governing Metis Authority (Metis Settlements Act, 1990.): Fishing Lake Métis Settlement Council, Métis Settlements General Council

Area (2021)
  - Land: 1,726.45 km^{2} (666.59 sq mi)

Population (2021)
  - Total: 551
  - Density: 0.3/km^{2} (0.78/sq mi)
- Time zone: UTC−06:00 (Alberta Time)
- Website: flms.ca

Fishing Lake Métis Settlement (Cree: Packechawanis) is a Métis settlement in northern Alberta, Canada within the Municipal District of Bonnyville No. 87 and Treaty Six lands. Fishing Lake Métis Settlement was settled by inhabitants of the dissolved St. Paul des Métis settlement and served as a historic Fishing camp to Métis in the region for centuries. It is home to many historical events such as the Frog Lake Resistance and is home to the beginning of the 20th century Métis movement as led by Charles Delorme, Jack Desjarlais and J.F Dion. It is located approximately 15 km (9.3 mi) east of Highway 897 and 52 km (32 mi) south of Cold Lake.

== Location ==
Fishing Lake Métis Settlement is located next to the Alberta-Saskatchewan border in northeast central Alberta and shares a border with the Elizabeth Métis Settlement. Riel Beach is located off the settlement and is a tourist attraction where one is able to fish and boat. There is a recreational facility that offers numerous activities throughout the year, trails to ride bicycles, snowmobiles, and skis to sightsee the hills and lakes. They have rodeos with their horses around towns and the farming communities. There are newer amenities that are offered, like the skate park and the spray park. The community of Sputinow is where most of the community facilities are located, along with residential homes, but there is also accommodations outside of town.

== History ==
Originally, it was European and Aboriginal people who came from Edmonton to Fishing Lake in 1807 and others from Fort Chipewyan in 1819. Aboriginal people take into account the Inuit, Indian and Métis people of Canada. The fur trade and the whitefish is significant to their name Packechawanis, meaning a small place for netting attracted others to the land where Métis people settled. They feel connected to their environment like the lakes and wildlife as they have relied on this in the early centuries. In 1949 they had their boundaries set up, but this settlement was initially founded in 1938.

At first there were twelve settlements, but only eight Métis settlements were authorized in Canada. The settlements are autonomous and managed by the Métis Settlements General Council. The Métis Settlement Act occurred in 1990 which gave way for these people to govern and manage their own land. This act allowed the Métis to oversee 512,121 hectares of land.

=== Métis Rebellion in Batoche ===
In 1885, the Métis people were getting their territory taken away from them, which led them to unite with First Nation allies against the North West Field Force. Louis Riel led the Provisional Government of Saskatchewan which was established by the Métis. This did not end in favor of the Métis people, as they lost 51 people and around 173 were wounded. Canada won against the Métis government in which Louis was shortly caught and killed. This battle resulted in the end of the 1885 North-West Resistance and displaced the Métis people to different locations.

=== The Ewing Commission ===
In 1935, the Alberta government would be able to look into the living conditions of the Métis and step in when needed. After looking into their health, issues on land and homelessness, they were provided with a sheltered land base and amenities.

== Demographics ==
As a designated place in the 2021 Census of Population conducted by Statistics Canada, Fishing Lake had a population of 414 living in 151 of its 167 total private dwellings, a change of −7.2% from its 2016 population of 446. With a land area of 348.64 km^{2} (134.61 sq mi), it had a population density of 1.2/km^{2} (3.1/sq mi) in 2021.

The population of the Fishing Lake Metis Settlement according to its 2018 municipal census is 436, a decrease from its 2015 municipal census population count of 491.

As a designated place in the 2016 Census of Population conducted by Statistics Canada, the Fishing Lake Métis Settlement had a population of 446 living in 160 of its 190 total private dwellings, a change of 2.3% from its 2011 population of 436. With a land area of 355.51 km^{2} (137.26 sq mi), it had a population density of 1.3/km^{2} (3.2/sq mi) in 2016.

== Environment ==
=== Climate ===
Fishing Lake Métis Settlement has a warm summer humid continental climate (Köppen: Dfb). During the winter it snows, while in the summer it is warm and humid. Winter is long and cold while summers are short and warm.

=== Animals ===
There are a variety of different animals present, such as cougars, martens, otters, black bears, moles, muskrats, gophers, badgers, white tailed deer, black bears, wolves, squirrels, moose, chipmunks, ground hogs, cinnamon bears, and more.

== Culture ==
=== Language ===
The main languages that is spoken in this settlement are Cree and English. There are other languages that the Métis people speak but are becoming extinct, like Bungee and Michif. Some older Métis are able to speak French Michif, but there are a few of these people. The Michif language is a combination of Cree, French, and Ojibwa but there is no person under 60 who can speak these. Even though there are lessons and other methods used to teach, it is expected that Michif will not exist for many years. The origin of Michif is unknown, but it was perhaps invented by Métis hunters in the early 19th century. Michif was used by the members of an independent community, which made it harder to trace and this meant that there were not many who knew about this language.

=== Lifestyle ===
The fiddle and the violin are significant instruments to the Métis. They connect sounds from the different cultures of their ancestors, consisting of Aboriginal, French, and Celtic. Instead of trading fur and fishing, the people in this settlement work in administration, farms, etc. Some members live outside of the Settlement but keep in touch. One must provide evidence that they are of Métis ancestry and be over 18 to apply to be part of the Fishing Lake Métis Settlement. The Right To Play Program was created as there are not many programs for the youth with an emphasis to help expand self-esteem, leadership, and communication skills through different activities.

=== Council ===
The council for the settlement is composed of five people who are selected by the members of the settlement and there is a chairperson that the other four council members select. These councils are able to create by-laws making sure that it does not violate general council policies or the provincial laws. The by-laws get approved by the members of the settlement if it follows guidelines. The council is in charge of membership allocations and approval of the settlement.

== In the media ==
There is representation of the Métis people through the artwork created by Stephen Gladue, who is a Métis artist, and throughout his artwork he incorporates aspects of his community. He composed the mural that is placed in Métis Crossing, a cultural destination that displays the stories of the Métis. It is the first Métis cultural interpretive centre in Alberta which showcases their cultural experiences. There are multiple activities that one can take part in such as traditional arts and crafts, community events, and nature trails. The cover of the graphic novel Moonshot: The Indigenous Comics Collection by Hope Nicholson is designed by Stephen.

== See also ==
- List of communities in Alberta
- List of designated places in Alberta
