= Elizabeth Metis Settlement =

Elizabeth
- Métis settlement
- Elizabeth Métis Settlement
- Logo

- Boundaries of Elizabeth

- Location within M.D. of Bonnyville

- Location of Elizabeth Métis Settlement in Alberta
- Country: Canada
- Province: Alberta
- Region: Northern Alberta
- Planning region: Lower Athabasca
- Municipal district: Bonnyville

Government
  - Chair: Irene Zimmer
  - Governing body: Elizabeth Métis Council

Area (2021)
  - Land: 246.45 km^{2} (95.15 sq mi)

Population (2021)
  - Total: 594
  - Density: 2.4/km^{2} (6.2/sq mi)
- Time zone: UTC−06:00 (Alberta Time)
- Website: elizabethms.ca

Elizabeth Métis Settlement is a Métis settlement in central Alberta, Canada within the Municipal District of Bonnyville No. 87. It was founded in 1939 after the introduction of the Metis Betterment Act. It is located approximately 20 km (12 mi) east of Highway 897 and 39 km (24 mi) south of Cold Lake and comprises 25,641 hectares of land. Industries such as oil, gas, forestry, and construction are commonly practiced by members of the settlement.

== History ==
=== Name ===
The word Metis is a French term describing a person of mixed race origin. In western Canada, the term is more commonly used to describe the mix of indigenous and American/European roots.

=== Origin ===
The Elizabeth settlement is one of the ten Metis settlements that were created in 1939 thanks to the Metis Betterment Act of 1938. These settlements were established for the Metis individuals living in the province of Manitoba who were left without a land base after the 1871 census. Every married metis individual living inside the Manitoba province had been promised 160 acres of land but after a surplus of applicants, many of these members were left without their promised land, receiving monetary compensation of around one dollar per acre or 160 dollars instead. These issues led to the famous Northwest Rebellion of 1885 in which Metis individuals rebelled against the Canadian government over these land disputes. The resulting outcome of these battles was the capture and removal of many Metis who had to leave the area without any safe land-base for these people.

=== The Metis Betterment Act ===
After the Northwest rebellion of 1885 many Metis groups were left without any land base to settle on for more than 50 years. In 1932 the Metis Association of Alberta was established by the former political members of the Metis. These individuals persuaded the Alberta government to investigate the poor living conditions of the Metis groups that were affected by the Northwest Rebellion. Thanks to these actions, the Alberta government passed the Metis Betterment Act in 1938 to establish a number of settlements for the Metis groups to call their home. A total of twelve settlements were made. these were called, Buffalo Lake, Cold Lake, East Prairie, Elizabeth, Fishing Lake, Gift Lake, Kikino, Marlboro, Paddle Prairie, Big Prairie, Touchwood, and Wolf Lake.

=== 1930-1960 ===
During the first couple of years of the settlements being established, the main purpose of the settlements was to improve the living conditions for the Metis groups in the settlements. The management of the settlements was supposed to be based on a constitution, elections, and board meetings so that the people and the local government could both have authority in the decision-making for the settlements. Unfortunately, the real method of governance that took place in the settlements was more paternalistic, where the government and church had more control over what took place in the settlements. This was more apparent after 1940, when there were a couple of changes to the Metis Betterment Act that gave the government more control, which consequentially reduced the amount of involvement the Metis people in the settlement's decision making.

=== 1975 Alberta Federation of Metis Settlements ===
After all the years of legislative changes and the lack of self-government, many activists from the settlements created the Alberta Federation of Metis Settlements in 1975; Their main goal was to regain control of their settlements and the land. After decades of legal conflicts, the Federation finally had its goal realized when the Alberta government passed a number of acts known as The Metis Settlements Act, The Metis Settlements Land Protection Act, The Metis Settlements Accord Implementation Act, and the Constitution of Alberta Amendment Act. With these acts, the Metis people in the settlements gained control of 152,121 hectares of land.

== Demographics ==
As a designated place in the 2021 Census of Population conducted by Statistics Canada, Elizabeth had a population of 594 living in 189 of its 207 total private dwellings, a change of −9% from its 2016 population of 653. With a land area of 246.45 km^{2} (95.15 sq mi), it had a population density of 2.4/km^{2} (6.2/sq mi) in 2021.

The population of the Elizabeth Metis Settlement according to its 2018 municipal census is 639, a decrease from its 2015 municipal census population count of 690.

As a designated place in the 2016 Census of Population conducted by Statistics Canada, the Elizabeth Métis Settlement had a population of 653 living in 183 of its 246 total private dwellings, a change of −0.2% from its 2011 population of 654. With a land area of 252.44 km^{2} (97.47 sq mi), it had a population density of 2.6/km^{2} (6.7/sq mi) in 2016.

== Culture ==
Unlike other types of aboriginal cultures, a lot of the culture in the Elizabeth Metis Settlement comes from European backgrounds. The jig and the fiddle are examples of European artifacts that have become traditional dance and music for this settlement.

=== Metis Sash ===
Another cultural object of the Elizabeth Metis settlement is the sash, which is a wool belt made by hand which is around 3 meters long. This sash is typically used as a belt by the men and is worn on the shoulder by the women. The traditional purpose of this sash was to hold a coat closed, but today it is used for a variety of different dancing ceremonies where it stands out with its variety of colors and designs which are different depending on the region where it is from.

== Language ==
The 3 most typical languages spoken at the Elizabeth Metis Settlement are English, French, and Cree. Before the 1900s, the type of Cree language spoken by the Metis people was a mix of French and Cree known as Michif. This language is said to have originated from the native groups living around the most common French trading posts during the 17th and 18th centuries in the areas residing near the great lakes. When these tribes began migrating toward western and northern Canada, they took this language with them and that is why it developed separately from other French dialects in other parts of Canada. The Michif dialect saw a significant decline in use proceeding the events of the Northwest Rebellion of 1885, where it became prohibited to speak one's native tongue in schools. Today, the total number of fluent Michif speakers is said to vary from around 1750 to fewer than 1000. This language is said to be in danger of extinction since mostly all fluent Michif speakers are over 60 years old.

== Religion ==
Most Metis follow some sort of Catholicism, whether it's more traditional Roman Catholic or more indigenous-inspired folk Catholicism. There is one Roman Catholic church in the Elizabeth Metis Settlement next to the settlement's elementary school.

== See also ==
- List of communities in Alberta
- List of designated places in Alberta
