= Peavine Metis Settlement =

- Metis Settlement
- Location within Big Lakes County

- Location within Alberta
- Coordinates: 55°51′N 116°16′W
- Country: Canada
- Province: Alberta
- Region: Northern Alberta
- Census division: 17

Government
  - Chair: Claude Cunningham Jr.
  - Governing body: Peavine Metis Council

Area (2021)
  - Land: 328.42 km^{2} (126.80 sq mi)

Population (2021)
  - Total: 310
  - Density: 0.9/km^{2} (2.3/sq mi)
- Time zone: UTC−06:00 (Alberta Time)

the chair is now Claude Cunningham Jr. and the councillors are Rod Carifelle, Cory Carifelle, Greg Gauchier, and Dennis Cunningham as of 2025.

Peavine Metis Settlement is a Metis settlement in northern Alberta, Canada within Big Lakes County. It is located on Highway 750 to the northeast of High Prairie.

== History ==
The area started being established by settlers in the early 1920s. Settlers would travel to nearby communities to encourage Métis families to reside in Peavine Metis Settlement in an effort to ensure boundaries were not altered, with many new families moving there between 1950 and 1952.

== Demographics ==
In the 2021 Census of Population conducted by Statistics Canada, Peavine had a population of 387 living in 150 of its 201 total private dwellings, a change of −36.2% from its 2016 population of 607. With a land area of 798.95 km^{2} (308.48 sq mi), it had a population density of 0.5/km^{2} (1.3/sq mi) in 2021.

The population of the Peavine Metis Settlement according to its 2018 municipal census is 566, a decrease from its 2015 municipal census population count of 639.

As a designated place in the 2016 Census of Population conducted by Statistics Canada, the Peavine Metis Settlement had a population of 607 living in 192 of its 284 total private dwellings, a change of −12% from its 2011 population of 690. With a land area of 816.38 km^{2} (315.21 sq mi), it had a population density of 0.7/km^{2} (1.9/sq mi) in 2016.

== See also ==
- List of communities in Alberta
- List of designated places in Alberta
