= East Prairie Metis Settlement =

East Prairie
- Metis Settlement
- East Prairie Metis Settlement
- Boundaries of East Prairie

- Location within Big Lakes County

- Location within Alberta East Prairie (Canada)
- Coordinates: 55°11′N 116°9′W
- Country: Canada
- Province: Alberta
- Region: Northern Alberta
- Planning region: Upper Athabasca
- Municipal district: Big Lakes
- Founded: 1939

Government
  - Chair: Gerald Cunningham
  - Governing body: East Prairie Metis Council

Area (2021)
  - Land: 802.46 km^{2} (309.83 sq mi)

Population (2021)
  - Total: 625
  - Density: 0.8/km^{2} (2.1/sq mi)
- Time zone: UTC−06:00 (Alberta Time)
- Forward sortation area: T0G
- Area codes: 780, 587, 825

East Prairie Metis Settlement is a Metis settlement in northern Alberta, Canada within Big Lakes County. It is located approximately 20 km (12 mi) south of Highway 2 and 168 km (104 mi) east of Grande Prairie. It was founded in 1939.

Its chairperson is Raymond Supernault. Its vice chairperson is Doug Bellerose. Its council members are Delores Desjarlais, Keith Patenaude, and Reva Jaycox.

== Demographics ==
As a designated place in the 2021 Census of Population conducted by Statistics Canada, East Prairie had a population of 310 living in 120 of its 148 total private dwellings, a change of 2% from its 2016 population of 304. With a land area of 328.42 km^{2} (126.80 sq mi), it had a population density of 0.9/km^{2} (2.4/sq mi) in 2021.

The population of the East Prairie Metis Settlement according to its 2018 municipal census is 491, an increase from its 2015 municipal census population count of 459.

As a designated place in the 2016 Census of Population conducted by Statistics Canada, the East Prairie Metis Settlement had a population of 304 living in 98 of its 157 total private dwellings, a change of −16.9% from its 2011 population of 366. With a land area of 334.44 km^{2} (129.13 sq mi), it had a population density of 0.9/km^{2} (2.4/sq mi) in 2016.

== See also ==
- List of communities in Alberta
- List of designated places in Alberta
