= Gift Lake Metis Settlement =

- Metis Settlement
- Location within Big Lakes County

- Location of Gift Lake Metis Settlement in Alberta
- Coordinates: 55°53′N 115°48′W
- Country: Canada
- Province: Alberta
- Region: Northern Alberta
- Census division: 17

Government
  - Chair: Arthur Tomkins
  - Governing body: Gift Lake Metis Council

Area (2021)
  - Land: 349.41 km^{2} (134.91 sq mi)

Population (2021)
  - Total: 414
  - Density: 1.2/km^{2} (3.1/sq mi)
- Time zone: UTC−06:00 (Alberta Time)

Gift Lake Metis Settlement is a Metis settlement in northern Alberta, Canada within Big Lakes County. It is located along Highway 750, approximately 203 km (126 mi) northeast of Grande Prairie.

== Demographics ==
In the 2021 Census of Population conducted by Statistics Canada, Gift Lake (parts A and B combined) had a population of 625 living in 182 of its 225 total private dwellings, a change of −5% from its 2016 population of 658. With a land area of 803.29 km^{2} (310.15 sq mi), it had a population density of 0.8/km^{2} (2.0/sq mi) in 2021.

The population of the Gift Lake Metis Settlement according to its 2018 municipal census is 812, an increase from its 2015 municipal census population count of 651.

As a designated place in the 2016 Census of Population conducted by Statistics Canada, by combining parts "A" and "B", the Gift Lake Metis Settlement had a population of 658 living in 186 of its 236 total private dwellings, a change of −0.6% from its 2011 population of 662. With a land area of 812.73 km^{2} (313.80 sq mi), it had a population density of 0.8/km^{2} (2.1/sq mi) in 2016.

== See also ==
- List of communities in Alberta
- List of designated places in Alberta
