= 2014 Alberta municipal censuses =

- April 1–June 30, 2014
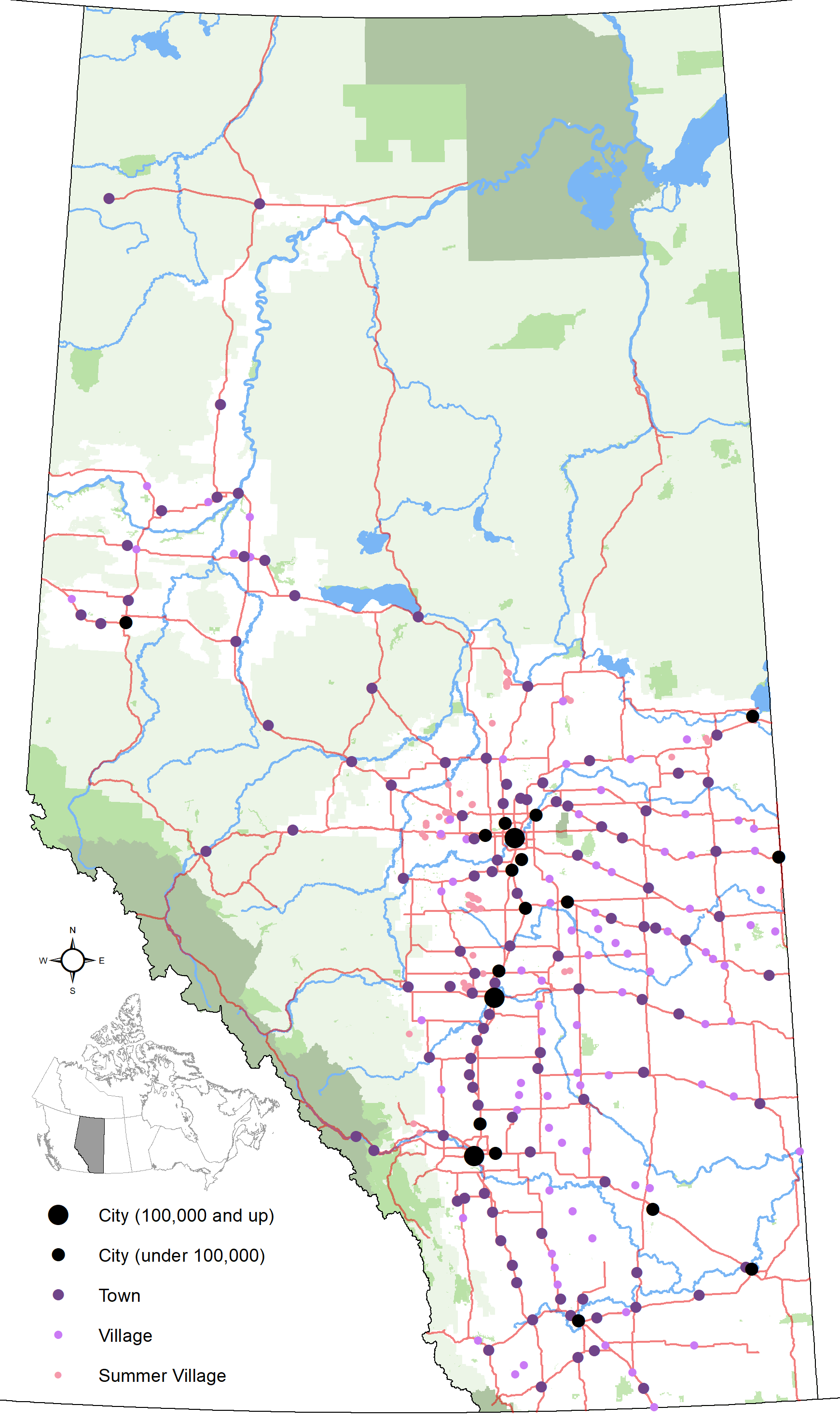
- Distribution of Alberta's 269 urban municipalities

Alberta has provincial legislation allowing its municipalities to conduct municipal censuses between April 1 and June 30 inclusive. Municipalities choose to conduct their own censuses for multiple reasons such as to better inform municipal service planning and provision, to capitalize on per capita based grant funding from higher levels of government, or to simply update their populations since the last federal census.

Alberta had 357 municipalities between April 1 and June 30, 2014, down from 358 as at June 30, 2013, (Note: The Village of Tilley dissolved to become a hamlet under the jurisdiction of the County of Newell on August 31, 2013.) which marked the closure of the 2014 legislated municipal census period. At least 39 of these municipalities (10.9%) conducted a municipal census in 2014. Alberta Municipal Affairs recognized those conducted by 37 of these municipalities. By municipal status, it recognized those conducted by 13 of Alberta's 17 cities, 18 of 108 towns, 3 of 93 villages, 1 of 51 summer villages and 2 of 64 municipal districts. (Note: No censuses were conducted among Alberta's 5 specialized municipalities, 3 special areas and 8 improvement districts.) In addition to those recognized by Municipal Affairs, censuses were conducted by the Town of Drayton Valley and the Municipal District of Lesser Slave River No. 124.

Some municipalities achieved population milestones as a result of their 2014 censuses. Airdrie and Cochrane grew beyond the 50,000 and 20,000 marks respectively, while both Beaumont and Cold Lake exceeded 15,000. The towns of Morinville, St. Paul and Raymond surpassed 9,000, 6,000 and 4,000 residents respectively, while the Municipal District (MD) of Lesser Slave River No. 124 exceeded 3,000.

== Municipal census results ==
The following summarizes the results of the numerous municipal censuses conducted in 2014.

2014 municipal census summary				2011 federal census comparison				Previous municipal census comparison			
Municipality	Status	Census date	2014 pop.	2011 pop.	Absolute growth	Absolute change	Annual growth rate	Prev. pop.	Prev. census year	Absolute growth	Annual growth rate
Airdrie	City	April 15, 2014	54,891	42,564	12,327	29%	8.8%	49,560	2013	5,331	10.8%
Banff	Town	June 16, 2014	8,421	7,584	837	11%	3.6%	7,251	2011	1,170	5.1%
Barons	Village	June 16, 2014	318	315	3	1%	0.3%	326	2010	−8	0.6%
Beaumont	Town	May 1, 2014	15,828	13,284	2,544	19.2%	6.0%	14,916	2013	912	6.1%
Bentley	Town	May 1, 2014	1,122	1,073	49	4.6%	1.5%	1,132	2009	−10	−0.2%
Blackfalds	Town	June 30, 2014	7,858	6,300	1,558	24.7%	7.6%	7,275	2013	583	8.0%
Bonnyville	Town	April 1, 2014	6,921	6,216	705	11.3%	3.6%	6,837	2012	84	0.6%
MD of Bonnyville No. 87	Municipal district	April 1, 2014	11,836	10,101	1,735	17.2%	5.4%				
Boyle	Village	June 4, 2014	948	916	32	3.5%	1.2%	918	2009	30	0.6%
Bruderheim	Town	April 1, 2014	1,348	1,155	193	16.7%	5.3%	1,298	2012	50	1.9%
Calgary	City	April 1, 2014	1,195,194	1,096,833	98,361	9%	2.9%	1,156,686 (Note: The City of Calgary's 2013 municipal census population was originally reported as 1,149,552. This population was revised to 1,156,686 in July 2014. The city's revised 2013 census report explains it was "adjusted upward due to a correction to the automated conversion process.")	2013	38,508	3.3%
Calmar	Town	June 7, 2014	2,101	1,970	131	6.6%	2.2%	2,033	2009	68	0.7%
Camrose	City	April 1, 2014	18,038	17,286	752	4.4%	1.4%	17,236	2011	802	1.5%
Canmore	Town	May 21, 2014	13,077	12,288	789	6.4%	2.1%	12,317	2011	760	2.0%
Chestermere	Town	May 1, 2014	17,203	14,824	2,379	16%	5.1%	15,762	2013	1,441	9.1%
Cochrane	Town	April 1, 2014	20,708	17,580	3,128	17.8%	5.6%	18,750	2013	1,958	10.4%
Cold Lake	City	April 1, 2014	15,736	13,839	1,897	13.7%	4.4%	14,400	2012	1,336	4.5%
Crossfield	Town	May 1, 2014	2,918	2,853	65	2.3%	0.8%	2,861	2010	57	0.5%
Devon	Town	June 5, 2014	6,650	6,510	140	2.2%	0.7%	6,534	2009	116	0.4%
Drayton Valley	Town	April 30, 2014		7,049				6,579	2006		
Edmonton	City	April 1, 2014	877,926	812,201	65,725	8.1%	2.6%	817,498	2012	60,428	3.6%
Forestburg	Village	April 15, 2014	880	831	49	5.9%	1.9%	863	2004	17	0.2%
Fort Saskatchewan	City	April 28, 2014	22,808	19,051	3,757	19.7%	6.2%	21,795	2013	1,013	4.6%
Lacombe	City	April 7, 2014	12,728	11,707	1,021	8.7%	2.8%	11,733	2009	995	1.6%
Leduc	City	April 28, 2014	28,583	24,279	4,304	17.7%	5.6%	27,241	2013	1,342	4.9%
MD of Lesser Slave River No. 124	Municipal district	May 1, 2014	3,074	2,929	145	5%	1.6%	2,840	2003	234	0.7%
Lethbridge	City	April 1, 2014	93,004	83,517	9,487	11.4%	3.7%	90,417	2013	2,587	2.9%
Morinville	Town	April 15, 2014	9,402	8,569	833	9.7%	3.1%	8,504	2011	898	3.4%
Okotoks	Town	May 7, 2014	27,331	24,511	2,820	11.5%	3.7%	26,319	2013	1,012	3.8%
Olds	Town	April 9, 2014	8,617	8,235	382	4.6%	1.5%	8,511	2013	106	1.2%
Penhold	Town	May 14, 2014	2,842	2,375	467	19.7%	6.2%	2,476	2012	366	7.1%
Raymond	Town	April 14, 2014	4,081	3,743	338	9%	2.9%	3,982	2013	99	2.5%
Red Deer	City	May 5, 2014	98,585	90,564	8,021	8.9%	2.9%	97,109	2013	1,476	1.5%
Spruce Grove	City	April 1, 2014	29,526	26,171	3,355	12.8%	4.1%	24,646	2010	4,880	4.6%
St. Albert	City	April 7, 2014	63,255	61,466	1,789	2.9%	1.0%	60,994	2012	2,261	1.8%
St. Paul	Town	May 15, 2014	6,004	5,400	604	11.2%	3.6%	5,844	2012	160	0.7%
Waiparous	Summer village	May 21, 2014	64	42	22	52.4%	15.1%	72	2007	−8	−1.7%
Wetaskiwin	City	May 1, 2014	12,621	12,525	96	0.8%	0.3%	12,285	2009	336	0.5%
Woodlands County	Municipal district	May 1, 2014	4,612	4,306	306	7.1%	2.3%	2,980	1991	1,632	1.9%

== Breakdowns ==
=== Hamlets ===
The following is a list of hamlets that had populations determined by the 2014 municipal census conducted by their administering municipal districts.

2014 municipal census summary
Hamlet	Municipality	2014 population
Ardmore	MD of Bonnyville No. 87	359
Beaver Crossing	MD of Bonnyville No. 87	
Beaverdam	MD of Bonnyville No. 87	18
Blue Ridge	Woodlands County	
Canyon Creek	MD of Lesser Slave River No. 124	
Cherry Grove	MD of Bonnyville No. 87	405
Chisholm	MD of Lesser Slave River No. 124	
Flatbush	MD of Lesser Slave River No. 124	
Fort Assiniboine	Woodlands County	
Fort Kent	MD of Bonnyville No. 87	246
Goose Lake	Woodlands County	
La Corey	MD of Bonnyville No. 87	59
Marten Beach	MD of Lesser Slave River No. 124	
Smith	MD of Lesser Slave River No. 124	
Therien	MD of Bonnyville No. 87	71
Wagner	MD of Lesser Slave River No. 124	
Widewater	MD of Lesser Slave River No. 124	

== Shadow population counts ==
Alberta Municipal Affairs defines shadow population as "temporary residents of a municipality who are employed by an industrial or commercial establishment in the municipality for a minimum of 30 days within a municipal census year." The Town of Banff and the MD of Bonnyville No. 87 conducted shadow population counts in 2014. The following presents the results of these counts for comparison with its concurrent municipal census results.

2014 municipal census shadow population summary
Municipality	Status	Permanent population	Shadow population	Combined population
Banff	Town	8,421	965	9,386
MD of Bonnyville No. 87	Municipal district	11,836	1,397	13,233

== See also ==
- 2013 Alberta municipal elections
- List of communities in Alberta
- List of municipalities in Alberta
