= 2011 Slave Lake wildfire =

Natural disaster in Slave Lake, Alberta, Canada

Coordinates: 55°16.4′N 114°45.6′W

- Date: May 14–16, 2011
- Location: Slave Lake, Alberta, Canada

Statistics
- Burned area: 4,700 hectares (12,000 acres)

Impacts
- Deaths: 1 (indirectly via helicopter crash)
- Structures destroyed: 433 (+89 damaged)
- Cost: $750 million ($1.03 billion in 2025 dollars)

Ignition
- Cause: Arson

A large wildfire burned through Slave Lake, Alberta, Canada, and its surrounding area from May 14 to 16, 2011. The conflagration, which originated 15 kilometres (9.3 mi) outside of town as a forest fire, was quickly pushed past fire barriers designed to protect the town by 100-kilometre-per-hour (60 mph) winds. The fire forced the complete evacuation of Slave Lake's 7,000 residents—considered the largest such displacement in the province's history at the time—to the nearby towns of Athabasca and Westlock, as well as the provincial capital of Edmonton. No casualties were reported amongst the town's population, but a pilot was killed when his helicopter crashed while he was battling the fires around the community.

The fire destroyed roughly one-third of Slave Lake; 374 properties were destroyed and 52 damaged in the town, and another 59 were destroyed and 32 damaged in the surrounding Municipal District of Lesser Slave River No. 124, leaving 732 residents homeless. The town hall was completely gutted by the fire, as was the library and radio station. The hospital, Royal Canadian Mounted Police (RCMP) station and schools remained standing, however. Insurable damage was estimated at $750 million, making it the second costliest insured disaster in the country's history at the time. An RCMP investigation concluded that the cause of the fire was arson; however, no arrests were made.

The disaster prompted an outpouring of support from across the province, and across Canada. The Canadian Red Cross and disaster relief agencies in Edmonton were inundated with donations—enough that they asked people to no longer make donations directly at the evacuation centres. ATB Financial offered to defer mortgage and loan payments for affected residents, while a Calgary-based rental company offered rental suites in Edmonton to displaced residents free of charge for three months. The provincial government promised $50 million in immediate aid to the town.

== 2011 fire season ==
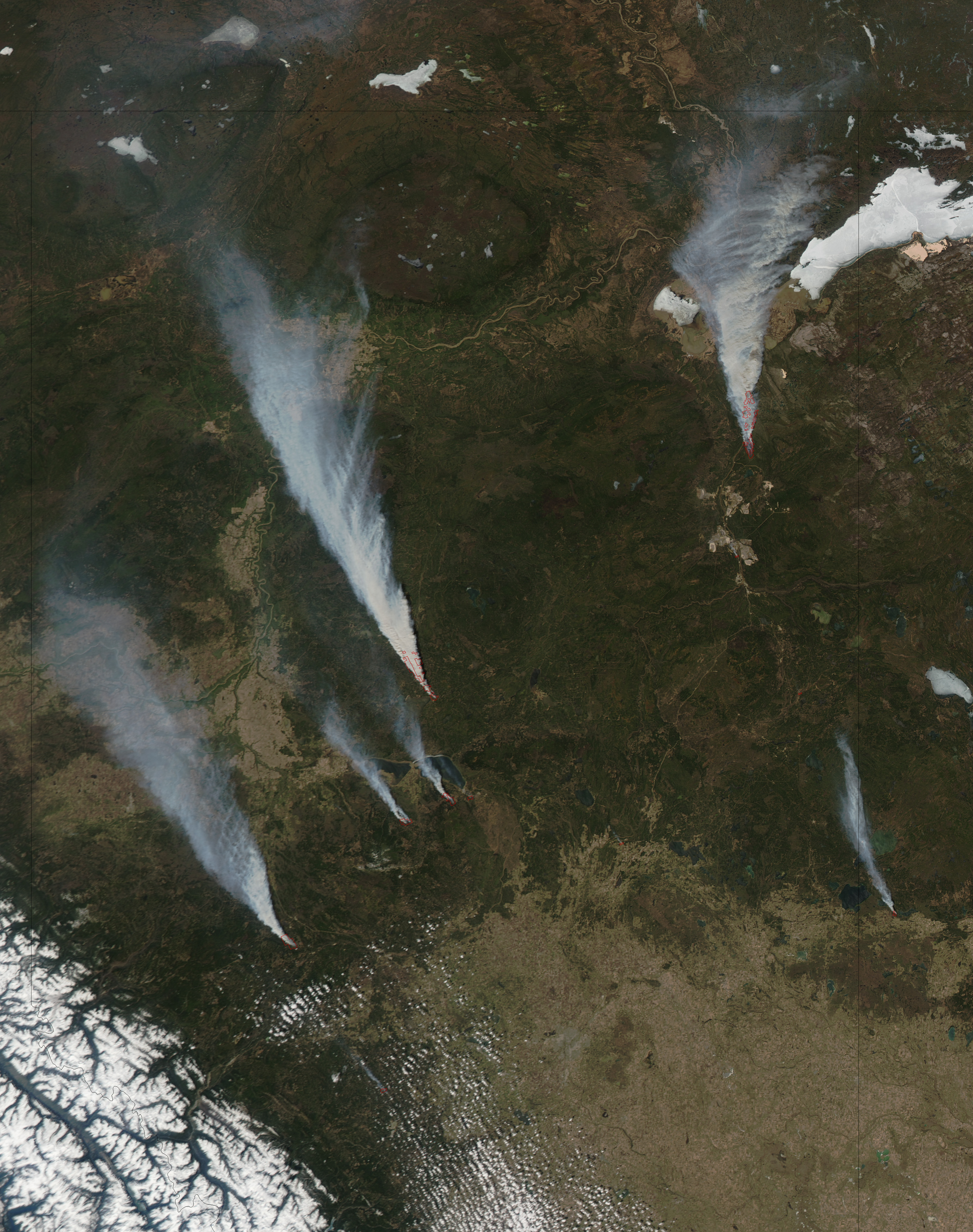

— NASA satellite image of wildfires burning in Alberta on May 16. Slave Lake is noted by a red dot.

Wildfires are common in Canada. Approximately 8,000 such fires occur every year across the country, and collectively burn 2.5 million hectares of land. Such fires in Alberta usually occur in remote areas and rarely threaten populated settlements. The last fire to seriously affect a community in Alberta destroyed 59 buildings in the hamlet of Chisholm in 2001. The Slave Lake area has been threatened by fires in the past. Communities on the eastern outskirts of town were evacuated in 2001 by the approach of the Chisholm fire, while the town was saved from destruction by change in the winds in 1968.

The province faced unusually dry conditions and high winds throughout the spring, leading to extreme risk of fire across much of the province. By mid-May, over 100 wildfires were burning across the province, including 23 that were considered out of control. Over 105,000 hectares (260,000 acres) had been burned, and the majority of the fires were in the Lesser Slave Lake area, where 15 fires were burning out of control. Nearly 1100 firefighters were battling the blazes across the country. As a consequence of the fire conditions, the provincial government enacted a complete fire ban across the entire province ahead of the Victoria Day long weekend; it was only the second time in history the government had issued such an order.

The fire that struck Slave Lake started 15 kilometres (9 mi) east of town around 1:30 pm on May 14, and grew to 500 hectares (1,200 acres) within three hours. An evacuation order was issued for 250 people who lived in the area, while a second fire burning west of Slave Lake, near the hamlet of Wagner, prompted provincial officials to order the evacuation of 800–900 people from that area. Displaced residents were sent to Slave Lake, where the town's fire chief initially expressed confidence that the town itself was not in serious danger, though Slave Lake declared a local state of emergency that night.

== Evacuation ==
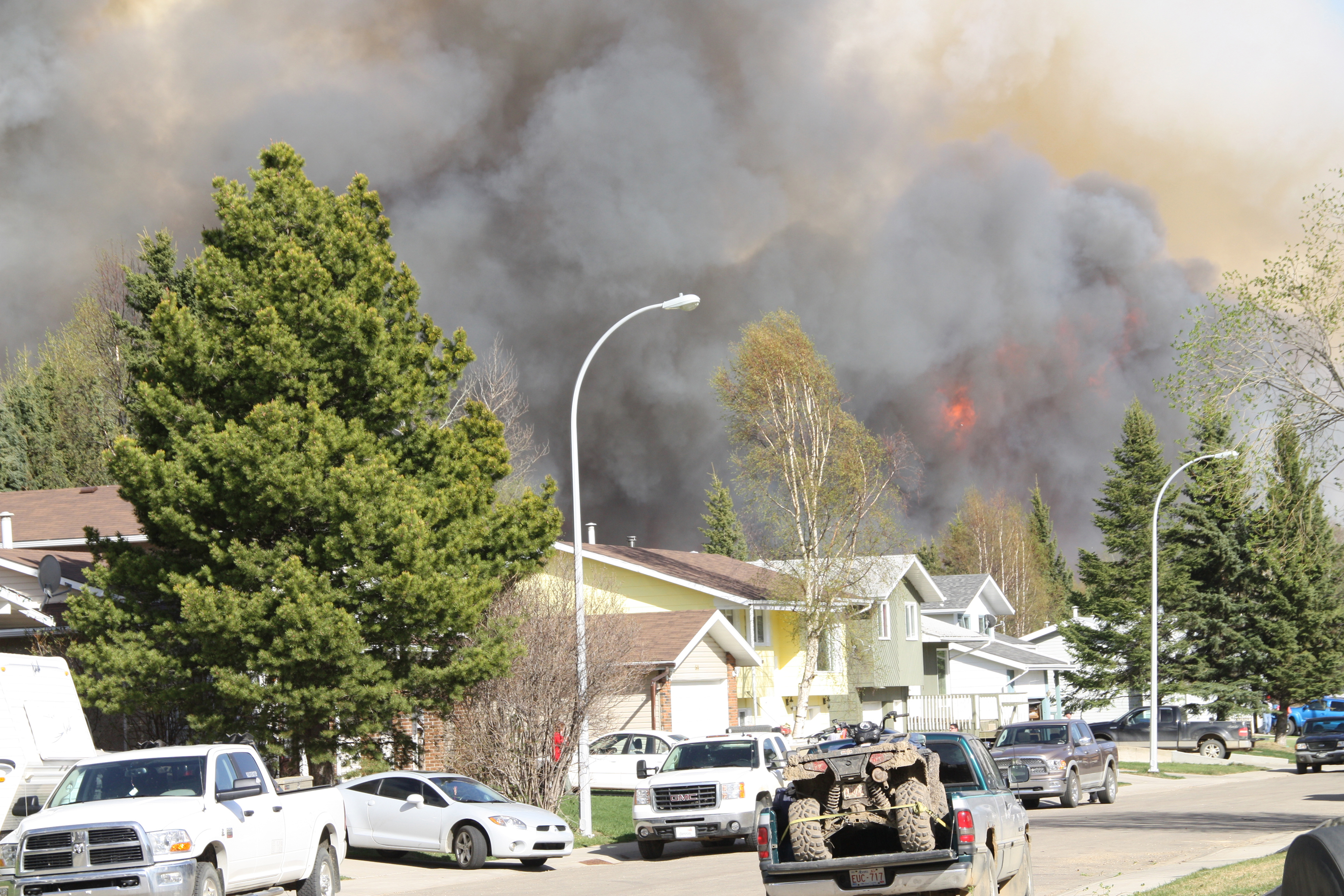
Fire over the town of Slave Lake at 5:40 pm on May 15

By 2:00 pm on May 15, the province had declared the fire situation around Slave Lake to be a level 3 emergency, and announced that states of emergency existed in both the town and the surrounding Municipal District of Lesser Slave River No. 124. The local radio station, Lake-FM, provided continuous updates to the community as the fires approached town. Officials remained hopeful that Slave Lake would be spared; by mid-afternoon, they felt they were gaining control of the fires. However, a change in the winds, gusting to up to 100 kilometres per hour (60 mph), pushed the conflagrations past firebreaks and into town a short time later.

Residents began to evacuate Slave Lake in the late afternoon as provincial officials re-opened Highway 2 eastbound to allow residents to leave. Efforts to encourage residents to leave were slowed by power failures that knocked Lake FM off the air. By 9:30 pm, the province declared a level 4 emergency—the highest on its scale, and the first such declaration since 2005—and a half hour later, mandatory evacuation was ordered for all residents of Slave Lake. Over 7,000 people fled east and south to the neighbouring towns of Athabasca and Westlock, as well as the provincial capital of Edmonton, 250 kilometres (160 mi) south. It was said to be the largest such displacement in Alberta's history at the time.

By morning on May 17, officials announced that 95% of the town's residents had been evacuated and that RCMP officers were conducting searches for any residents who stayed behind. Only essential staff and firefighters remained in the community. The RCMP dispatched personnel from neighbouring detachments to bolster Slave Lake's usual 20-officer contingent while additional firefighters were sent to Slave Lake from across the province to support the 120 already battling the blazes in the town. Among the deployments were 100 firefighters, nine trucks and a heavy urban search and rescue team from Calgary.

Some residents questioned whether town officials acted fast enough to evacuate the town, noting that the order to leave was made after people had already begun to flee. Mayor Karina Pillay-Kinnee defended the actions of officials, noting that "this is a first-time experience for us. I think it's an unusual situation. We had fires on either end of the community. What I'm thankful for at this point is we have no loss of life."

== Damage ==
As residents fled Slave Lake, the winds sent burning embers overhead which ignited homes and businesses. Evacuees described the horizon as being "nothing but red", noting that thick smoke had already engulfed the town as they left town. One resident said "it looked like hell". Firefighters attempted a "last stand" in the east part of town, but were quickly overwhelmed by the heat and burning embers thrown forward by the blaze.

The fire ravaged the southeast part of town, destroying half the buildings in the area, while a second fire struck the northwest part of Slave Lake. The incident commander described it as a firestorm, stating that "the nature of which is unprecedented. The speed it was moving, the heat it was generating, the devastation, is second to none." He praised the efforts of firefighters who chose to demolish some homes in advance of the fire, a decision he said saved many homes in the town.

In addition to hundreds of houses, the town hall, library, radio station and a mall were destroyed, as were two churches. However the hospital, RCMP station and schools remained standing. In total, the fire destroyed roughly one-third of Slave Lake; 374 properties were destroyed and 52 damaged in the town proper, and another 59 were destroyed and 32 damaged in the surrounding area. 732 people were left homeless as a result.

Insurable damage caused by the fire was estimated at over $700 million. It was the second costliest disaster in Canadian history, at the time, topped only by the North American ice storm of 1998, which caused $1.8 billion in damages, adjusted for inflation to 2011 dollars.

No casualties were reported amongst Slave Lake residents as a result of the fire, but a pilot was killed when his helicopter crashed while battling the blaze. Jean-Luc Deba, an experienced pilot from Montreal, died in the crash at Canyon Creek, 24 kilometres (15 mi) west of Slave Lake.

== Aftermath ==
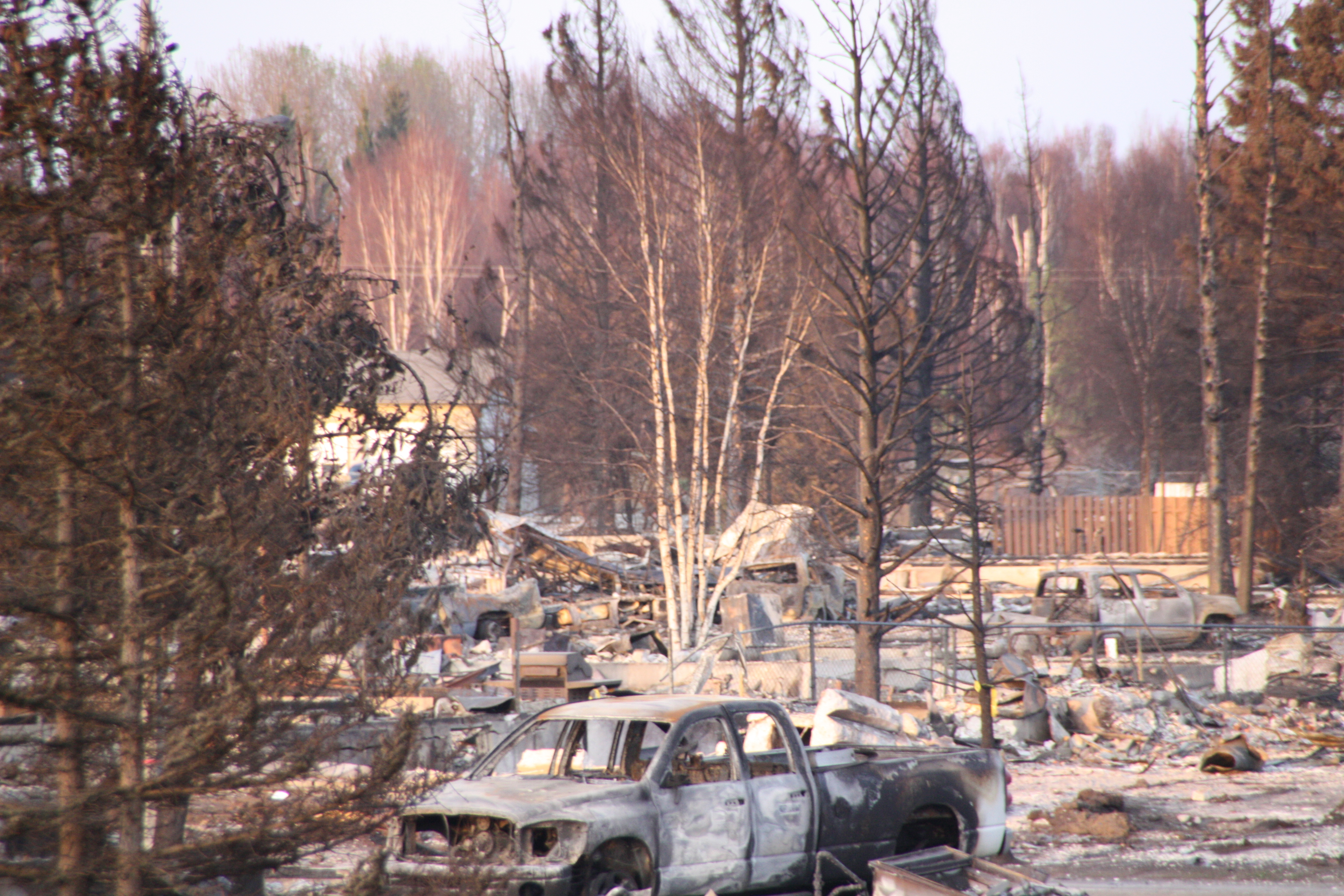
Southeast Slave Lake, June 2011

Several days after the fire, residents had little idea of whether their homes and businesses still stood. By May 19, Mayor Karina Pillay-Kinnee met with evacuees, informing them that recovery efforts had begun, but that residents would not be able to return to Slave Lake until power, gas, phone service and access to drinkable water was restored. By May 20, a map of damaged areas was released.

A week after the fire ravaged the town, provincial officials organized buses from the evacuation centres to allow residents to tour the damage. Few residents took advantage of the opportunity, but those that did felt the tour offered a sense of closure.

Ten days after the town was evacuated, the first residents were allowed to return as part of a four-phase plan. Approximately 100 workers in essential service areas, along with their families, were allowed to return on May 25. Their return followed the restoration of critical infrastructure including power, water supply, telephone, police and fire services. It was expected the town's remaining residents would begin to return within days, and while some residents expressed no plans on returning to their former homes, many looked forward to doing their part to help rebuild their community.

A local developer suggested it would be months before the community could even begin to rebuild homes lost in the fire, Local home builders were expected to be overwhelmed by the task, while Slave Lake's remote location posed additional challenges to the rebuild process, including questions of where workers brought in to help rebuild the town would be housed.

By early July, drought conditions in northern Alberta changed to a series of floods that prompted further evacuations of at least 65 residents.

Later, a book, The Sky Was on Fire: Slave Lake's Story of Disaster, Exodus and New Beginnings, written by Len and Nicola Ramsey, Joe McWilliams, and MJ Kristoff, was produced containing many of the victims and residents experiences of the fire.

== Investigation ==
In November 2011, the RCMP concluded a five-and-a-half-month investigation into the cause of the fire. After eliminating other causes, including lightning, the RCMP and the Alberta government declared that the fire was deliberately set. Sustainable Resources Minister Frank Oberle stated, “the probable cause of the fire that burned more than 400 homes and other structures in Slave Lake was arson.”

Though officials determined the place and method of ignition, they did not name any suspects. With $700 million in damage, the case was the largest arson investigation in Canadian history in terms of dollar value. The case was not handled by the Slave Lake RCMP detachment; as 11 officers lost their homes, an outside investigative team was assigned for reasons of objectivity.

== Response ==
Immediately following the fire, the Alberta government promised $50 million in aid to the town. Half of that was provided as immediate relief for residents, including $9 million to pay for costs incurred during the evacuation. Another $15 million was set aside for residents without adequate insurance coverage or with limited financial capability, and would cover all housing costs for such people until August. Prime Minister Stephen Harper and Premier Ed Stelmach toured the town via helicopter and met with front-line firefighters a week after the fire. Following the tour, Harper promised additional aid from the federal government.

Albertans responded to the disaster with material and financial support. The Canadian Red Cross and disaster relief agencies in Edmonton were inundated with material donations—enough that they asked people to no longer make material donations directly at the evacuation centres. Communities across the province launched support drives to collect necessary supplies for evacuees. Grade school students organized fundraising drives, and community groups and businesses were overwhelmed by the public response.

Businesses across the province also stepped forward to help. Among them, ATB Financial offered to defer mortgage and loan payments for affected residents, while a Calgary-based rental company offered 50 rental suites in Edmonton to displaced residents free of charge for three months. Athabasca University made space available for limited school classes to resume for evacuated students, Insurance companies quickly set up operations near evacuation centres to assist residents with any questions or concerns.

A benefit concert held in Edmonton and televised by CBC Television in mid June raised $150,000 for the Red Cross. Performers included Tom Jackson, George Canyon, and Johnny Reid. A second benefit held over the Canada Day long weekend in Slave Lake itself hoped to raise an additional $100,000. The three-day event, which averaged 3,000–5,000 fans per day, was headlined by Ashley MacIsaac, Dwight Yoakam, and the Stampeders and offered the community's residents an opportunity to relax in the midst of rebuilding efforts. On July 6, the Duke and Duchess of Cambridge (Prince William and Catherine), visited the town to offer encouragement to residents and rebuilding efforts.

Slave Lake residents expressed gratitude towards those who offered support to the community, even as it continued to struggle through the aftermath and rebuilding efforts weeks later.

On August 3, the Government of Alberta announced an additional $189 million for rebuilding and disaster response in the Slave Lake area. The funding was allocated to: a regional wildfire recovery plan; a disaster recovery program for the town, the municipal district, the Hamlet of Red Earth Creek, the Gift Lake Metis Settlement, and numerous nearby First Nations reserves; and an interim housing project to accommodate 350 interim homes for displaced residents and families of the town and the municipal district.

On September 14, a second benefit concert, headlined by Paul Brandt and featuring High Valley, was held at the Winspear Centre in Edmonton. Proceeds from the concert went to replacing the books at the Slave Lake Regional Library and a project in Haiti.

== See also ==
- 2013 Alberta floods
- 2016 Fort McMurray wildfire
- List of fires in Canada
