= Franchère =

Franchère may refer to:

== Persons with the surname ==
- Gabriel Franchère (1786–1863), French Canadian fur trader, explorer and writer
- Timothée Franchère (c. 1790–1849), merchant and politician, Province of Canada
- Joseph-Charles Franchère (1866–1921), a Canadian painter from Quebec

== Places ==
- Franchere, Alberta (sometimes Franchère), an unincorporated community in central Alberta, Canada
- Franchère Lake, a tributary of the Rivière aux Écorces du Milieu in Capitale-Nationale, Quebec, Canada
- Franchère Peak, a summit in the Astoria River valley of Jasper National Park in the Canadian Rockies of Alberta, Canada
