= Iron Horse Trail, Alberta =

Multiuse rail trail in northeastern Alberta, Canada

Iron Horse Trail
- Length: 278 km (173 mi)
- Location: Smoky Lake County, County of St. Paul No. 19 and Municipal District of Bonnyville No. 87, Alberta, Canada
- Established: 2003
- Designation: Trans Canada Trail
- Trailheads: Waskatenau, Cold Lake, Heinsburg
- Use: Off-highway vehicles, snowmobiling, horseback riding, cycling, hiking
- Season: Year-round
- Surface: Gravel and dirt railbed

The Iron Horse Trail is a rail trail in northeastern Alberta, Canada. About 278 kilometres (173 mi) long, it follows the former Canadian National Railway (CN) line from Waskatenau east to a junction near Ashmont, from which one arm continues northeast through Bonnyville to Cold Lake and another southeast through St. Paul and Elk Point to Heinsburg. The corridor is owned by North East Muni-Corr Ltd., a company formed by the municipalities along the route, and operated by the Riverland Recreational Trail Society. It opened in June 2003 and is the longest rail-trail conversion in Alberta and the province's longest continuous section of the Trans Canada Trail. It is used year-round by all-terrain vehicles and other off-highway vehicles, snowmobiles, horses, mountain bikes and hikers.

== History ==
=== Railway ===
The line was built by the Canadian Northern Railway, which was absorbed into CN after 1918, running east from a point near Smoky Lake toward Cold Lake, with a branch south from Ashmont to Elk Point and Heinsburg. The railway reached Bonnyville in 1928. In CN's later operations the corridor formed parts of its Coronado and Bonnyville subdivisions.

CN abandoned the 34 km (21 mi) Elk Point–Heinsburg section in 1980 and the remainder of the corridor in 1999.

=== Conversion to a trail ===
The County of St. Paul No. 19 acquired the abandoned Elk Point–Heinsburg right-of-way together with a gravel pit that had been the original object of the purchase. Residents persuaded the county to designate the line a linear park, and the trail was started at the gravel pit near Elk Point in 1993. Residents from Smoky Lake to Heinsburg formed the Riverland Recreational Trail Society to build and operate a trail along the corridor. (Note: Sources differ on the society's founding date: Lakeland Today gives 1993, while the Forth Junction Heritage Society gives September 1999.)

When CN abandoned the rest of the line in 1999, the society and the municipalities along the route were already organized to convert it. Ten municipalities formed North East Muni-Corr Ltd., a company under Part 9 of Alberta's Companies Act, to own and administer the corridor; the land transfer was completed in 2001. Removing the rails and fencing the trestles took about two years, and the Iron Horse Trail officially opened in June 2003. It became part of the Trans Canada Trail in 2004.

=== Later developments ===
In June 2012 a burning car was pushed off the north embankment of the Beaver River trestle near Cold Lake, lodging in the structure and setting it on fire. Full repair was estimated at about $1.5 million, and local residents organized a "Save the Beaver River Trestle" fundraising campaign. The trestle was stabilized with a temporary timber A-frame and repaired using undamaged original timber where possible, and reopened to trail users and off-highway vehicles.

In 2019 the Riverland society began a ten-year master plan for the trail, A Master Plan to Unlock Our Potential, completed in 2021 with funding from the society, Trans Canada Trail and the Alberta Snowmobile Association. The planning process surveyed trail users, the ten member municipalities, five snowmobile clubs and tourism operators; 64 per cent of respondents were recreational users, and ATVs, side-by-sides and snowmobiles were the most popular uses. The plan's priorities include trail maintenance, entrance points, signage, amenities and managing non-recreational use of the corridor. Design work for staging areas at Waskatenau, Smoky Lake, St. Paul, Heinsburg, Elk Point, Bonnyville, the Beaver River trestle and Ardmore was the subject of a subsequent Alberta Community Partnership grant application. In 2025 the society launched a multi-year tree-planting program along the trail.

== Route ==
The trail's operators divide it into three sections meeting at Abilene Junction, the former railway junction west of Ashmont.

Sections of the Iron Horse Trail
Section	Length	Communities (west to east)
Western	92 km (57 mi)	Waskatenau – Warspite – Smoky Lake – Bellis – Vilna – Abilene Junction
Northeastern	98 km (61 mi)	Abilene Junction – Mallaig – Glendon – Bonnyville – Fort Kent – Ardmore – Beaver River trestle – Cold Lake
Southeastern	88 km (55 mi)	Abilene Junction – St. Paul – Elk Point – Lindbergh – Heinsburg

The western section passes through Smoky Lake, the gateway to Victoria Settlement and Métis Crossing, and crosses several trestles near Bellis, including one of 200 m (660 ft) in the hamlet. The northeastern section passes Franchere Bay Provincial Recreation Area and Moose Lake Provincial Park, where a 500 m (1,600 ft) trestle is crossed, before reaching Bonnyville. Between Ardmore and Cold Lake it crosses the Beaver River on the trail's longest trestle, about 450 m (1,480 ft) long and 60 m (200 ft) above the valley floor. The southeastern section follows part of the historic Carlton Trail near St. Paul, passes near the Fort George and Buckingham House interpretive centre southeast of Elk Point, and ends at Heinsburg, where a 1928 CN station and wooden water tower are preserved. Lakeland Today has described the water tower as the only intact one remaining on its original site in Alberta.

In all, the trail crosses 18 wooden railway trestles, which were fenced before the trail opened. (Note: The Rocky Mountain Outlook counts 19 trestles between Waskatenau and the two eastern termini.)

== Use and management ==
The trail is open year-round to off-highway vehicles, snowmobiles, horses and wagons, cyclists and hikers, and is used for fishing, wildlife viewing and birdwatching. Besides forming part of the Trans Canada Trail, it is part of the Trans Canadian Snowmobile Trail system. Staging areas with parking and rest facilities are provided at communities along the route, including Warspite, Smoky Lake, Bellis, Ashmont, Mallaig, St. Paul, Elk Point, Lindbergh and Heinsburg.

Because the right-of-way is municipally owned, it has also been used as a utility corridor: by the mid-2010s five regional water lines had been installed within it.

== See also ==
- List of rail trails
- Trans Canada Trail
