= Mitsue Lake Industrial =

Hamlet in Alberta, Canada

Mitsue Lake Industrial Mitsue
- Hamlet
- Location of Mitsue Lake Industrial in MD of Lesser Slave River No. 124 Mitsue Lake Industrial (Alberta)
- Coordinates: 55.268495°N 114.593418°W
- Country: Canada
- Province: Alberta
- Region: Northern Alberta
- Census division: No. 17
- Municipal district: Municipal District of Lesser Slave River No. 124

Government
  - Type: Unincorporated
  - Reeve: Murray Kerik
  - Governing body: M.D. of Lesser Slave River Council
- Time zone: UTC−06:00 (Alberta Time)

Mitsue Lake Industrial, also known as Mitsue Lake or simply Mitsue, is a hamlet and industrial park in the Municipal District of Lesser Slave River No. 124 in Alberta, Canada. The hamlet is approximately 15 km (9.3 mi) east of the town of Slave Lake. It is named after the adjacent Mitsue Lake, which in turn is named after the Cree word Mitsue which means "eating".

== Economy ==
Mitsue Lake Industrial is home to three timber processing mills, multiple oil and gas-related businesses, and a calcium chloride manufacturing plant. In 2023, Mitsue Lake Industrial had a total of 595 permanent full-time employees.

== See also ==
- List of hamlets in Alberta
- Gasoline Alley, Alberta - another industrial park and hamlet near Red Deer
- Nisku, Alberta - another industrial park and hamlet near Edmonton
