= Flatbush (disambiguation) =

Flatbush is a neighborhood in Brooklyn, New York City.

Flatbush may also refer to:

- Flatbush, Alberta, a hamlet in Canada
- Flatbush (TV series), 1979 American sitcom

== See also ==
- Flat Bush, a suburb of Auckland, New Zealand
