= 2014 census =

2014 census may refer to:

- 2014 Alberta municipal censuses
- 2014 Crimean Federal District Census
- 2014 Moldovan Census
- 2014 Moroccan census
