= Elk Point =

Elk Point may refer to:

- Elk Point, South Dakota
- Elk Point, Alberta
