= Athlone, Edmonton =

Athlone
- Neighbourhood
- Location of Athlone in Edmonton
- Coordinates: 53.587°N 113.551°W
- Country: Canada
- Province: Alberta
- City: Edmonton
- Quadrant: NW
- Ward: Anirniq
- Sector: Mature area
- Named for: Alexander Cambridge, 1st Earl of Athlone

Government
  - Administrative body: Edmonton City Council
  - Councillor: Erin Rutherford
  - MLA: Jon Carson
  - MP: Blake Desjarlais

Area
  - Total: 1.19 km^{2} (0.46 sq mi)
- Elevation: 680 m (2,230 ft)

Population (2012)
  - Total: 3,116
  - Density: 2,618.5/km^{2} (6,782/sq mi)
  - Change (2009–12): ▼−0.7%
  - Dwellings: 1,208

Athlone is a residential neighbourhood in north west Edmonton, Alberta, Canada. The neighbourhood is named after the Earl of Athlone, Canada's governor-general from 1940 to 1946. The western portion of the neighbourhood is also called Dunvegan, after the Dunvegan Yards, a railway depot that existed on the site for some 70 years.

The most common type of residence in the neighbourhood, according to the 2005 municipal census, is the single-family dwelling. These account for four out of every five (80.2%) of all the residences in the neighbourhood. Row houses account for another one in seven (14.9%) of all residences. Most of the remaining residences are duplexes. Just under three out of every four (73%) of all residences are owner-occupied with just over one out of every four (27%) being rented.

There are two schools in the neighbourhood. Athlone Elementary School is operated by the Edmonton Public School System, while Sir John Thompson Catholic Junior High School is operated by the Edmonton Catholic School System. Wellington Junior High School has been decommissioned and demolished.

The neighbourhood is bounded on the east by 127 Street. The southern boundary is located half a block south of 127 Street. The northern boundary to the east of 135 Street is 132 Avenue, and west of 135 street is located half a block south of 132 Avenue. The western boundary north of 130 Avenue is located approximately half a block west of 139 Street, and south of 130 Avenue, it is located approximately half a block west of 138 Street.

The community is represented by the Athlone Community League, established in 1958, which maintains a community hall and outdoor rink at 129 Street and 130 Avenue.

== History ==
Residential development in Athlone, according to the 2001 federal census, began before the end of World War II, when approximately one out of every fifteen (6.6%), of all residences were constructed. Most residential development in Athlone occurred between the end of the war and 1970. During this period, just over half (56.1%) of all residences were constructed. There was very little residential development between 1970 and 1990. The 1990s saw a period of renewed development in the neighbourhood with one in three residences (33.3%) of residences being built between 1991 and 2001.

== Demographics ==
In the City of Edmonton's 2012 municipal census, Athlone had a population of 3,116 living in 1,208 dwellings, a −0.7% change from its 2009 population of 3,139. With a land area of 1.19 km^{2} (0.46 sq mi), it had a population density of 2,618.5 people/km^{2} in 2012.

== See also ==
- Edmonton Federation of Community Leagues
- Royal eponyms in Canada
