= Mallaig, Alberta =

Canadian hamlet, founded 1928

Mallaig
- Hamlet
- Location of Mallaig Mallaig (Canada)
- Coordinates: 54.209°N 111.366°W
- Country: Canada
- Province: Alberta
- Region: Central Alberta
- Census division: 12
- Municipal district: County of St. Paul No. 19
- Established: 1928

Government
  - Type: Unincorporated
  - Governing body: County of St. Paul No. 19 Council

Area (2021)
  - Land: 0.6 km^{2} (0.23 sq mi)

Population (2021)
  - Total: 210
  - Density: 347.4/km^{2} (900/sq mi)
- Time zone: UTC−06:00 (Alberta Time)
- Area codes: 780, 587, 825

Mallaig is a hamlet in Alberta, Canada within the County of St. Paul No. 19. It is located approximately 200 kilometres (120 mi) northeast of Edmonton and 100 kilometres (62 mi) southwest of Cold Lake.

The hamlet was one of the many communities that spawned due to the construction of the railroad in Western Canada during the early 1900s. In 1928, the hamlet was officially founded. The name was inspired by one of the Scottish workers. The many swamps and low-lying areas in the area reminded him of his home town of Mallaig, Scotland.

As the 20th century progressed, the railway has been removed, and has been replaced by the Iron Horse Trail, which is a long, recreational trail intended for all-terrain vehicles. The hamlet today is quite small, containing minimal services, a landfill, and a school (kindergarten to grade 12) with an enrollment of 246 students from the hamlet and surrounding area.

== Demographics ==
Population history of Mallaig
Year	Pop.	±%
1941	79	—
1951	206	+160.8%
1956	227	+10.2%
1961	205	−9.7%
1966	209	+2.0%
1971	190	−9.1%
1976	339	+78.4%
1981	189	−44.2%
1986	194	+2.6%
1991	189	−2.6%
1991A	195	+3.2%
1996	183	−6.2%
2001	162	−11.5%
2006	234	+44.4%
2011	173	−26.1%
2016	207	+19.7%
2021	210	+1.4%
Source: Statistics Canada

In the 2021 Census of Population conducted by Statistics Canada, Mallaig had a population of 210 living in 80 of its 83 total private dwellings, a change of 1.4% from its 2016 population of 207. With a land area of 0.6 km^{2} (0.23 sq mi), it had a population density of 350.0/km^{2} (906.5/sq mi) in 2021.

As a designated place in the 2016 Census of Population conducted by Statistics Canada, Mallaig had a population of 207 living in 70 of its 76 total private dwellings, a change of 19.7% from its 2011 population of 173. With a land area of 0.6 km^{2} (0.23 sq mi), it had a population density of 345.0/km^{2} (893.5/sq mi) in 2016.

== See also ==
- List of communities in Alberta
- List of designated places in Alberta
- List of hamlets in Alberta
