= Beacon Corner, Alberta =

Locality in Alberta, Canada

Coordinates: 54°10′50″N 111°09′13″W

Location of Beacon Corner in Alberta

Beacon Corner is an unincorporated locality in central Alberta, Canada within the Municipal District of Bonnyville No. 87. It is located along Alberta Highway 28.

== See also ==
- List of communities in Alberta
