= Flat Lake, Alberta =

Locality in Alberta, Canada

Coordinates: 54°07′27″N 111°09′09″W

Location of Flat Lake Alberta

Flat Lake is an unincorporated locality in central Alberta in the Municipal District of Bonnyville No. 87, located 6 kilometres (3.7 mi) south of Highway 28, 74 kilometres (46 mi) southwest of Cold Lake.
