= Marie Lake (Alberta) =

Lake in Alberta, Canada

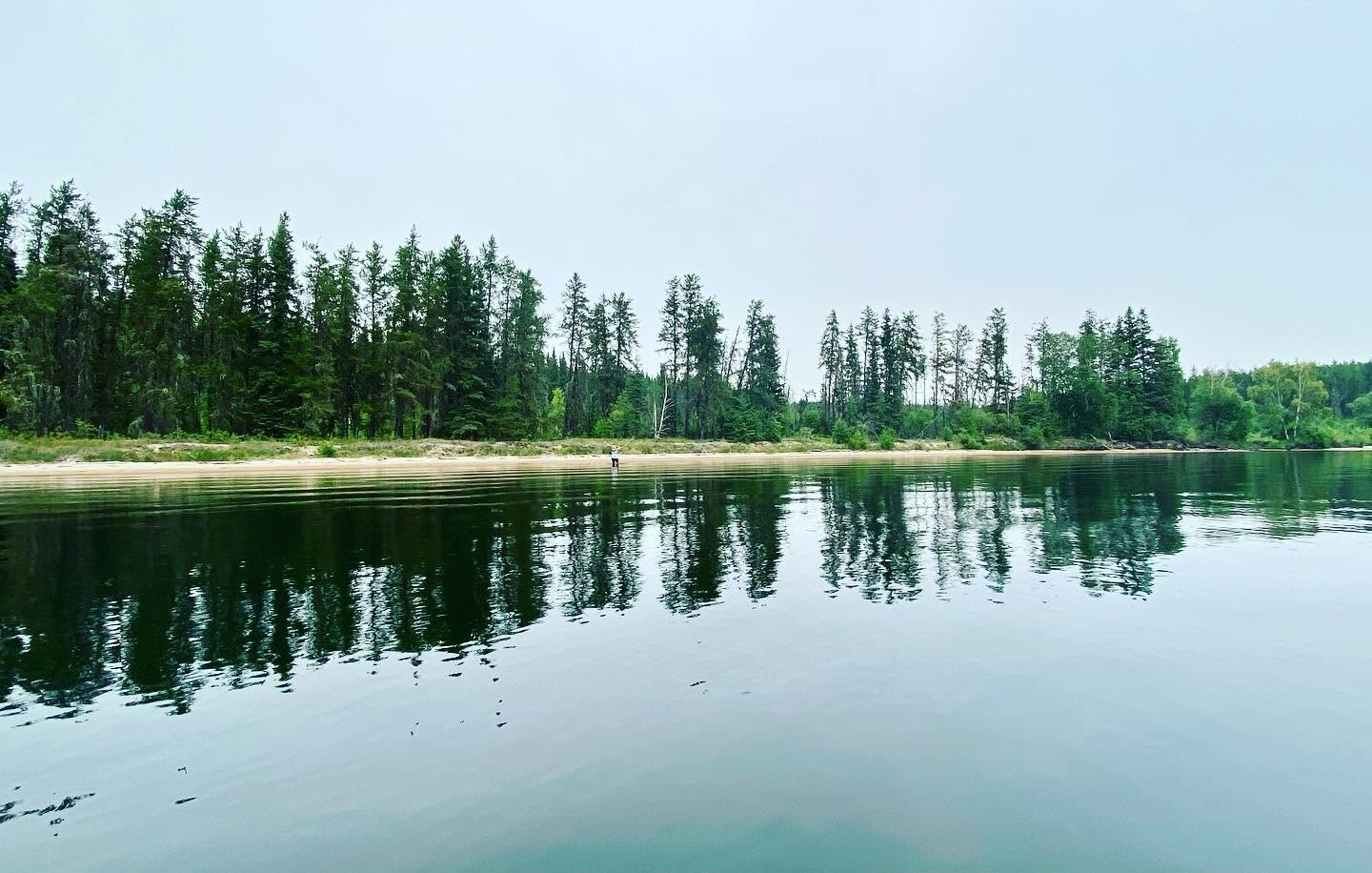
- Coast line on Marie Lake, Alberta

- Location within Alberta
- Location: Bonnyville No. 87, Alberta
- Coordinates: 54°37′58″N 110°17′53″W
- Basin countries: Canada
- Max. length: 7.4 km (4.6 mi)
- Max. width: 8.1 km (5.0 mi)
- Surface area: 34.6 km^{2} (13.4 sq mi)
- Average depth: 14.0 m (45.9 ft)
- Max. depth: 26 m (85 ft)
- Surface elevation: 572 m (1,877 ft)
- References: Marie Lake

Marie Lake is a lake in Alberta. It lies just northwest of the larger Cold Lake. The lake is known for fishing and camping.
