= Chisholm, Alberta =

Chisholm Chisholm Mills
- Hamlet
- Location of Chisholm in Alberta
- Coordinates: 54°54′34″N 114°10′08″W
- Country: Canada
- Province: Alberta
- Region: Northern Alberta
- Census division: 17
- Municipal district: M.D. of Lesser Slave River No. 124

Government
  - Type: Municipal District Council
  - Reeve: Murray Kerik
  - Governing body: M.D. of Lesser Slave River Council
  - MP: Arnold Viersen (Peace River—Westlock-Cons)
  - MLA: Danielle Larivee (Lesser Slave Lake-NDP)

Area (2021)
  - Land: 2.84 km^{2} (1.10 sq mi)
- Elevation: 622 m (2,041 ft)

Population (2021)
  - Total: 15
  - Density: 5.3/km^{2} (14/sq mi)
- Time zone: UTC−06:00 (Alberta Time)
- Postal code: T0G 0N0
- Area codes: 780, 587, 825
- Highways: Highway 44^{8.8 kilometres (5.5 mi) east.}
- Waterways: Athabasca River
- Website: MD of Lesser Slave River

Chisholm, also known as Chisholm Mills, is a hamlet in Alberta, Canada within the Municipal District of Lesser Slave River No. 124. Chisholm is located 1 kilometre (0.62 mi) east of the Athabasca River, approximately 56 kilometres (35 mi) southeast of the Town of Slave Lake. The hamlet is served by both road (approximately 8.5 kilometres (5.3 mi) west of Highway 44) and rail (Canadian National Railway).

== Toponymy ==
Chisholm is named for Thomas Chisholm, a well-known railway conductor and dance hall owner who lived locally. Chisholm, originally from Nova Scotia, was also one of the earliest investors in Alexander Pantage's chain of theatres, though Pantage would ignore requests by Chisholm for financial help later in life. According to historian Harry Sanders, Chisholm was "penniless" at the time of his death in 1936.

== Topography ==
Chisholm is located upon a bench within a stretch of predominantly plains land, close to the banks of the Athabasca River.

=== Flora ===
The hamlet is surrounded by mixedwood stand forests, comprising boreal conifers such as black and white spruces, and deciduous trees including trembling aspens and birches.

== History ==
=== Founding and early decades: 1914-1980 ===
Chisholm was established in 1914 as one of the Dunvegan Yards railway stations operated by the Edmonton, Dunvegan and British Columbia Railway (later Northern Alberta Railways).

In June 1923, the area received a post office that operated under the name Chisholm Mills, so called due to the presence of lumber mills in the area. The settlement continued to be mononymously known as Chisholm.

In its early decades, Chisholm's lumber industry attracted a population of transient or seasonal workers. By the end of the 1930s, Chisholm attracted a workforce of around 100 young men, and a small number of women who worked as cooks. Forestry workers and their families also made the area their permanent home.

During the Second World War, around 250 Japanese Canadians were forcibly interned at lumber mills throughout Alberta, some of whom were assigned to work at Chisholm Mills. A camp for German prisoners of war, Camp Chisholm, also operated during the conflict. The area also hosted a training ground for the Royal Canadian Air Force.

After the war, demand for lumber declined, and Chisholm's population also began declining. The settlement was nonetheless declared a hamlet in August 1980.

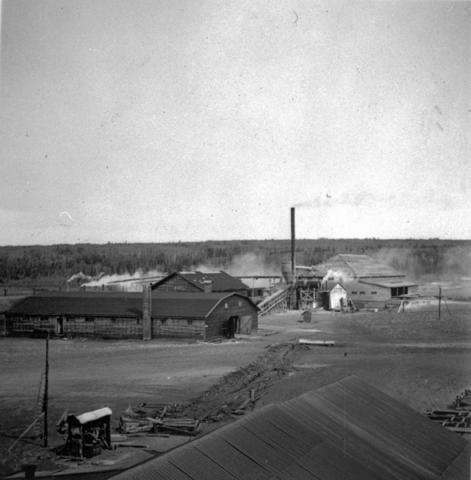
Chisholm Sawmill and Lumber Camp, pictured in the late 1930s.

=== Later developments: 1981-2000 ===
Heavy rains in July 1981 weakened and ultimately collapsed the rail bed near Chisholm, derailing a freight train consisting of three engines and 20 cars into the surrounding muskeg. No injuries occurred, though leaking butane and propane tankers forced crews to deliberately burn the hazardous materials so they could clear the wreckage and restore the track within two days.

By 1984, Chisholm Mills School had ceased operations due to low enrolment numbers, despite protests from the hamlet's residents.

=== 21st century: 2001-present ===
In May 2001, a major forest fire reached Chisholm, destroying ten houses, 48 outbuildings, vehicles, and a trapper's cabin. The Chisholm fire also burned 120,000 hectares of timber in the surrounding area. A subsequent investigation by the Government of Alberta concluded that the fire was caused by a faulty train wheel disposed of carelessly by the Canadian National Railway. In 2007, Chisholm's fire lookout tower was upgraded.

Chisholm's post office closed permanently in 2016. By this time, it was regularly serving 11 or 12 residents.

== Amenities ==
As of 2025, Chisholm contains a community hall operated by the Chisholm Community Association. A cemetery serving Chisholm and Hondo is maintained by volunteers.

== Demographics ==
Population history of Chisholm
Year	Pop.	±%
1941	323	—
1951	265	−18.0%
1956	225	−15.1%
1961	197	−12.4%
1966	86	−56.3%
1971	88	+2.3%
1976	60	−31.8%
1981	66	+10.0%
1986	53	−19.7%
1991	28	−47.2%
1991A	29	+3.6%
1996	25	−13.8%
2001	20	−20.0%
2006	20	+0.0%
2011	15	−25.0%
2016	25	+66.7%
2021	15	−40.0%
Source: Statistics Canada

In the 2021 Census of Population conducted by Statistics Canada, Chisholm had a population of 15 living in 9 of its 15 total private dwellings, a change of −40% from its 2016 population of 25. With a land area of 2.84 km^{2} (1.10 sq mi), it had a population density of 5.3/km^{2} (13.7/sq mi) in 2021.

As a designated place in the 2016 Census of Population conducted by Statistics Canada, Chisholm had a population of 25 living in 10 of its 18 total private dwellings, a change of 66.7% from its 2011 population of 15. With a land area of 2.92 km^{2} (1.13 sq mi), it had a population density of 8.6/km^{2} (22.2/sq mi) in 2016.

== See also ==
- List of communities in Alberta
- List of designated places in Alberta
- List of hamlets in Alberta
