= Goodridge, Alberta =

Coordinates: 54°23′03″N 111°21′06″W

Location of Goodridge Alberta

Goodridge is a farming community in northern Alberta within the Municipal District of Bonnyville No. 87, 11 kilometres (6.8 mi) south of Highway 55, 80 kilometres (50 mi) west of Cold Lake.

The Goodridge Jubilee Hall and fire hall are located at 49531 Township Road 624.

The name Goodridge was chosen for the school district created by the homesteaders in the area and the Goodridge School was built in 1932. The Goodridge Store and post office were opened in 1934 by Mr. and Mrs. Joe Good. The White Rat and Goodridge Social Society was incorporated in 1946 which eventually became the Goodridge Social and Agricultural Society that exists today.
