= Durlingville, Alberta =

Coordinates: 54°07′27″N 111°09′09″W

Location of Durlingville Alberta

Durlingville is an unincorporated area in central Alberta, Canada within the Municipal District of Bonnyville No. 87. It is located between Alberta Highway 28 and Alberta Highway 659.

The community's name is an amalgamation of Durand and Islin, the surnames of pioneer citizens.

== See also ==
- List of communities in Alberta
