= Beaver River, Alberta =

Coordinates: 54°07′27″N 111°09′09″W

Location of Beaver River Alberta

Beaver River is an unincorporated area in central Alberta, Canada within the Municipal District of Bonnyville No. 87. It is named after the Beaver River that flows from Alberta to Saskatchewan.

== See also ==
- List of communities in Alberta
