= Big Meadow, Alberta =

Coordinates: 54°07′27″N 111°09′09″W

Location of Big Meadow Alberta

Big Meadow is an unincorporated area in central Alberta, Canada within the Municipal District of Bonnyville No. 87. It is located near the Alberta Highway 28.

== See also ==
- List of communities in Alberta
