= Bank Bay, Alberta =

Coordinates: 54°07′27″N 111°09′09″W

Location of Bank Bay Alberta

Bank Bay is an unincorporated area in central Alberta, Canada within the Municipal District of Bonnyville No. 87. It is located on the bank of the Cold Lake Provincial Park.

== See also ==
- List of communities in Alberta
