= Therien, Alberta =

Therien
- Hamlet
- Location of Therien Therien (Canada)
- Coordinates: 54°14′22″N 111°15′13″W
- Country: Canada
- Province: Alberta
- Region: Central Alberta
- Census division: 12
- Municipal district: Municipal District of Bonnyville No. 87

Government
  - Type: Unincorporated
  - Governing body: Municipal District of Bonnyville No. 87 Council

Population (2014)
  - Total: 71
- Time zone: UTC−06:00 (Alberta Time)
- Area codes: 780, 587, 825

Therien is a hamlet in central Alberta, Canada within the Municipal District of Bonnyville No. 87, located approximately 7 kilometres (4.3 mi) north of Highway 28 and 74 kilometres (46 mi) southwest of Cold Lake. Therien had a population of 71 in 2014.

== Demographics ==
Population history of Therien
Year	Pop.	±%
1941	106	—
1951	166	+56.6%
1956	114	−31.3%
1961	83	−27.2%
1966	85	+2.4%
1971	51	−40.0%
1976	38	−25.5%
1981	39	+2.6%
1986	58	+48.7%
1991	52	−10.3%
Source: Statistics Canada

The population of Therien according to the 2014 municipal census conducted by the Municipal District of Bonnyville No. 87 is 71.

== See also ==
- List of communities in Alberta
- List of hamlets in Alberta
