= Marten Beach =

- Hamlet
- Location of Marten Beach Marten Beach (Canada)
- Coordinates: 55.311°N 114.551°W
- Country: Canada
- Province: Alberta
- Region: Northern Alberta
- Census division: 17
- Municipal district: Municipal District of Lesser Slave River No. 124

Government
  - Type: Unincorporated
  - Governing body: Municipal District of Lesser Slave River No. 124 Council

Population (1991)
  - Total: 38
- Time zone: UTC−06:00 (Alberta Time)
- Area codes: 780, 587, 825

Marten Beach is a hamlet in northern Alberta, Canada, within the Municipal District of Lesser Slave River No. 124. It is located on the northeast shore of Lesser Slave Lake, 2 kilometres (1.2 mi) west of Highway 88. It is approximately 36 kilometres (22 mi) north of the town of Slave Lake and 238 kilometres (148 mi) northwest of the city of Edmonton.

Marten Beach is adjacent to Lesser Slave Lake Provincial Park, Carlver Creek to the north and Marten Creek to the south.

== History ==
The hamlet was founded by Stevie and Herb Johnson of Plamondon, Alberta in the middle of the 20th century. They subdivided the property into the current hamlet and the neighboring Diamond Willow Resort campground, which they then used for subsequent income.

== Demographics ==
Marten Beach recorded a population of 38 in the 1991 Census of Population conducted by Statistics Canada.

== Attractions ==
Other attractions in the area, in addition to the Lesser Slave Lake Provincial Park and Diamond Willow Resort, include the bird observatory within the provincial park, Marten Mountain, Lily Lake, the Oilman's Sand Dunes, and sandy beaches along the lakeshore. Activities include horseback riding, bike trails, and year-round fishing.

== Notable people ==
Preston Manning, former Reform Party of Canada leader, owned a cabin in Marten Beach for a period of time.

== See also ==
- List of communities in Alberta
- List of hamlets in Alberta
