= Chisholm Fire =

2001 wildfire in Alberta

- A pyrocumulonimbus cloud over the Chisholm Fire on the afternoon of May 28, 2001.
- Date: May 23, 2001 – June 4, 2001
- Location: Alberta, Canada

Statistics
- Total area: 116,000 hectares (290,000 acres)

Impacts
- Structures destroyed: 61

The Chisholm fire was a forest fire in the Canadian province of Alberta that burned in the late spring of 2001. It is known for its exceptional intensity and fire behavior. In fact, at the time, it had the highest head fire intensity ever recorded. The fire was declared under control on June 4, 2001, with a total burned area of 116,000 hectares (290,000 acres). It was notable for its record-setting intensity and several research papers were conducted regarding this fire and its unique pyrocumulonimbus cloud. It was one of the first fires to have known to penetrate the tropopause in recorded history.

== Background ==
Northern Alberta is largely boreal forest, with a mix of deciduous and highly flammable conifer species, such as white and black spruce, balsam fir, and jack pine. This is a forest type adapted to fire that burns in 50- to 200-year cycles. In 2001, fire season started on March 1st, a month earlier than all previous years except 2000. This was the result of precipitation deficits from the winters of 1997-2000 which led to unprecedented fuel consumption by the fire. Over 300 fires have burned in Alberta in the few weeks prior to this fire, and 6 fires were burning simultaneously with this fire. Similarities have been drawn with the 1968 Vega Fire, in particular regarding the weather conditions, extreme fire intensity, rapid rates of spread, and the location where it burned.

== Ignition ==
The fire was initially discovered at 9:19 PM local time on May 23, 2001 by the public, who alerted fire officials. The Alberta government faulted a malfunctioning train wheel on a Canadian National Railway train as the source of the fire. The fire rapidly spread through the night and by 9 A.M the following day, it covered 4,000 hectares (9,900 acres) of land.

== Progression ==
Unusually intense fire behavior was observed on the first night, with crowning occurring late into the night. On the second day, extremely active fire behavior was recorded, including spots 1km ahead of the fire, and occasional torching. In the morning, the fire jumped the Athabasca River. By noon, it had spread further, with an infrared mapping putting it at 4,310 hectares (10,700 acres). The next day, the fire made its first run toward the hamlet of Chisholm, Alberta. At 19:00 local time, it crossed the dozer line, and then proceeded to spread extremely rapidly, covering approximately 1 mile (1.6 km) in just 5 minutes. Fire activity moderated on the 26th due to a small amount of rain. However, this lull in activity would not last long, as the next day, the fire made a large run to the northwest, away from Chisholm. The day after that(the 28th), winds were strong(30-50 km/h sustained), along with high fuel densities, so the day was dominated by extreme fire behavior. A spot fire was observed at 1:30 PM. Due to the strong winds, intense fire behavior, and smoke, the spot fire could not be brought under control, and the spot fire later burned some structures within the next couple hours. The fire soon developed a 45,000 foot convection column. Just after 4 P.M, another fire started NE of Chisholm, Alberta and rapidly spread, making a 12 kilometer run and chewing through 3,063 hectares (7,570 acres) of land by 8 P.M. Weather conditions moderated the next day, and from then on, no significant fire activity was observed.

== Effects ==
Firefighting efforts cost the Albertan government CA$10,000,000 (equivalent to $16,789,366 in 2025). The town of Chisholm suffered significant losses from the fire, with 10 homes, 51 outbuildings, and several vehicles destroyed. At that time, Chisholm only had a total of 19 houses. In addition, there were other losses, such as forest resource losses and oil and gas shutdowns. There was some controversy about firefighting methods used against the fire, with some people blaming the government for the loss of their homes. Suggestions pertaining to firefighting methods have been adopted by local officials. In 2004, CN agreed to pay CA$18.8 million as settlement, with some of those funds going toward wildfire reduction programs.

According to a widespread legend, in May 2001, an American agency whose satellites had observed the Chisholm fire called a wildfire expert from Alberta, asking if Canada had detonated a nuclear bomb. The legend is based on the fact that the energy released by the fire was the equivalent of multiple nuclear bombs.
