= Beaverdam, Alberta =

Beaverdam
- Hamlet
- Location of Beaverdam Beaverdam (Canada)
- Coordinates: 54°12′05″N 110°18′29″W
- Country: Canada
- Province: Alberta
- Region: Central Alberta
- Census division: 12
- Municipal district: Municipal District of Bonnyville No. 87

Government
  - Type: Unincorporated
  - Governing body: Municipal District of Bonnyville No. 87 Council

Population (2014)
  - Total: 18
- Time zone: UTC−06:00 (Alberta Time)
- Area codes: 780, 587, 825

Beaverdam is a hamlet in central Alberta, Canada within the Municipal District of Bonnyville No. 87, located approximately 16 kilometres (9.9 mi) south of Highway 28 and 30 kilometres (19 mi) southwest of Cold Lake.

== Demographics ==
The population of Beaverdam according to the 2014 municipal census conducted by the Municipal District of Bonnyville No. 87 is 18.

== See also ==
- List of communities in Alberta
- List of hamlets in Alberta
