= Franchere, Alberta =

Locality in Alberta, Canada

Coordinates: 54°16′04″N 111°01′55″W

Location of Franchere Alberta

Franchere (sometimes Franchère) is an unincorporated locality in central Alberta in the Municipal District of Bonnyville No. 87, located 10 kilometres (6.2 mi) east of Highway 28A, 59 kilometres (37 mi) west of Cold Lake.

The locality shares its name with nearby Franchere Bay, the northwest arm of nearby Moose Lake. Both are named for Gabriel Franchère, who visited the area in 1814 on his journey from Fort Astoria to Montreal.
