= Ardmore, Alberta =

Ardmore
- Hamlet
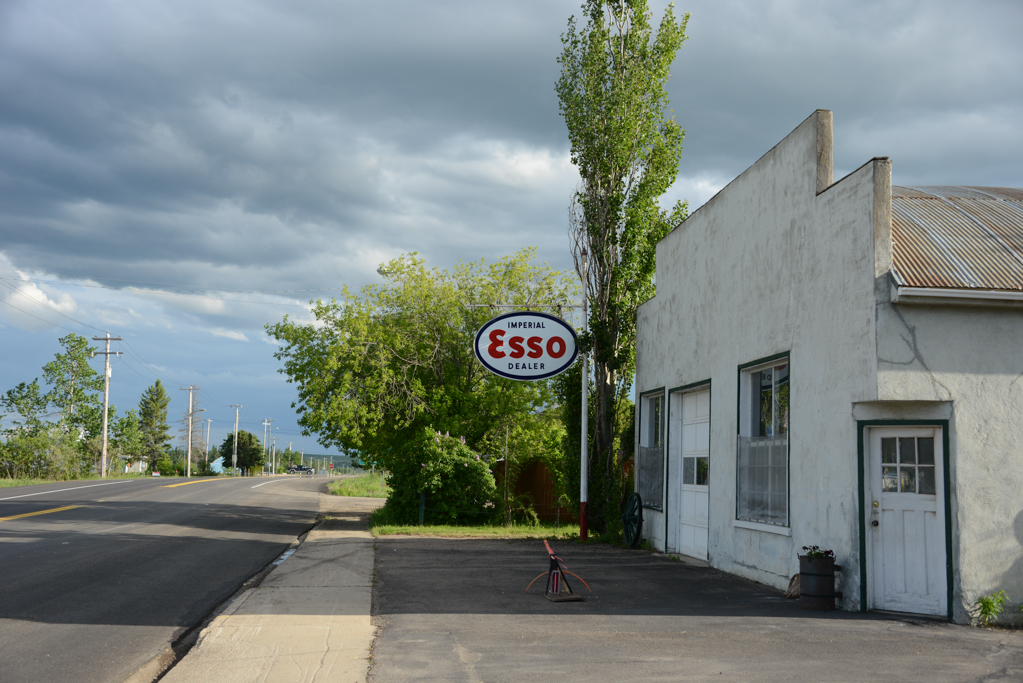

- Location of Ardmore in Alberta
- Coordinates: 54°19′55″N 110°28′58″W
- Country: Canada
- Province: Alberta
- Census division: No. 12
- Municipal district: Municipal District of Bonnyville No. 87
- Post office established: 1912–1915

Government
  - Type: Unincorporated
  - Governing body: Municipal District of Bonnyville No. 87 Council

Area (2021)
  - Land: 0.68 km^{2} (0.26 sq mi)

Population (2021)
  - Total: 317
  - Density: 466.2/km^{2} (1,207/sq mi)
- Time zone: UTC−06:00 (Alberta Time)
- Area code(s): 780, 587, 825

Ardmore is a hamlet in northern Alberta, Canada within the Municipal District of Bonnyville No. 87. It is located approximately 18 km (11 mi) east of Bonnyville along Highway 28 and has an elevation of 1,807 ft (551 m).

The community's name may be a transfer from a place of the same name in Ireland or Scotland.

== History ==
A post office opened at Ardmore between December 1912 and December 1915, more than a decade before the railway reached the district. Early settlers in the area were largely of British and Scandinavian origin; the Presbyterian missionary John Duclos, based in Bonnyville, had a log church built at Ardmore, which joined the United Church of Canada at the 1925 church union. The Canadian National Railway extended its line to Bonnyville in 1928 and on through Ardmore to Cold Lake; the line was abandoned in 1999 and its right-of-way now forms part of the Iron Horse Trail.

Jack and Belva Wagner built a grocery store in the hamlet in 1935 and converted it into the Ardmore Hotel in 1939.

== Community events ==
In August 2015, a winning LOTTO MAX ticket worth CAD $50 million was sold at the M&M Mini Mart in Ardmore.

The Ardmore School Parent Advisory Council (PAC) organizes an annual rubber duck race on the Beaver River to raise funds for the school. The event has been held since the early 1990s, releasing approximately 2,000 rubber ducks each year.

In 2021, one of the rubber ducks released during the race was found on the shore of the Barents Sea in Russia.

The race supports school programs, classroom allowances, field trips, and educational presenters.

== Demographics ==
Population history of Ardmore
Year	Pop.	±%
1941	98	—
1951	164	+67.3%
1956	207	+26.2%
1961	172	−16.9%
1966	245	+42.4%
1971	230	−6.1%
1976	238	+3.5%
1981	224	−5.9%
1986	268	+19.6%
1991	234	−12.7%
1991A	244	+4.3%
1996	239	−2.0%
2001	272	+13.8%
2006	314	+15.4%
2011	333	+6.1%
2016	315	−5.4%
2021	346	+9.8%
2021C	317	−8.4%
Source: Statistics Canada

In the 2021 Census of Population conducted by Statistics Canada, Ardmore had a population of 317 living in 134 of its 144 total private dwellings, a change of 0.6% from its 2016 population of 315. With a land area of 0.68 km^{2} (0.26 sq mi), it had a population density of 466.2/km^{2} (1,207.4/sq mi) in 2021.

As a designated place in the 2016 Census of Population conducted by Statistics Canada, Ardmore had a population of 315 living in 133 of its 152 total private dwellings, a change of −5.4% from its 2011 population of 333. With a land area of 0.68 km^{2} (0.26 sq mi), it had a population density of 463.2/km^{2} (1,199.8/sq mi) in 2016.

== See also ==
- List of communities in Alberta
- List of designated places in Alberta
- List of hamlets in Alberta
