= Municipal District of Bonnyville No. 87 =

Municipal district in Alberta, Canada

- Municipal district
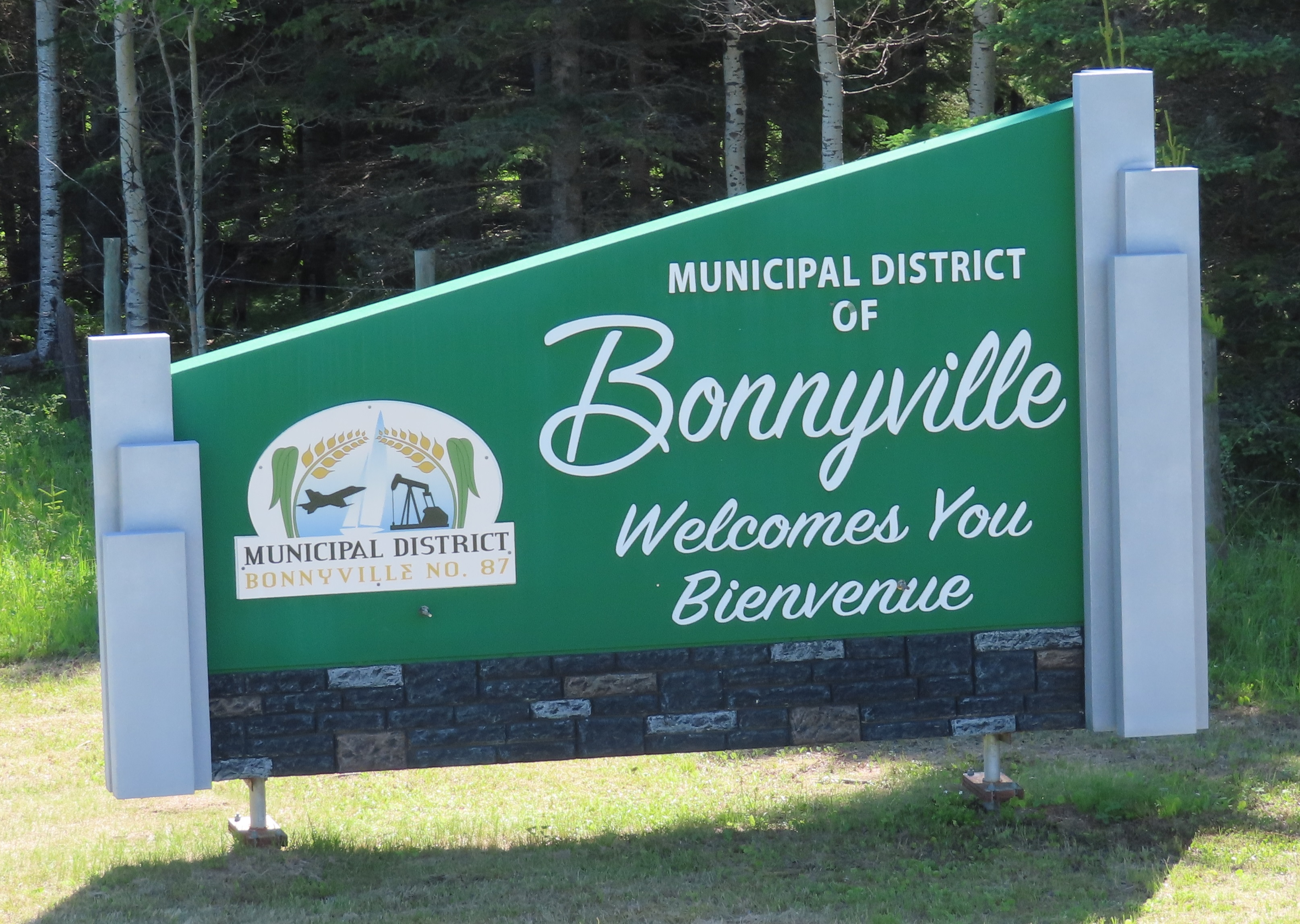
- Welcome sign

- Flag Logo

- Location within Alberta
- Country: Canada
- Province: Alberta
- Region: Northern Alberta
- Planning region: Lower Athabasca
- Established: 1914
- Incorporated: 1955

Government
  - Reeve: Barry Kalinski
  - Governing body: M.D. of Bonnyville Council: Ed Duchesne; Ben Fadeyiw; Marc Jubinville; Mike Krywiak; Greg Sawchuck; Darcy Skarsen; Dana Swigart
  - CAO: Al Hoggan
  - Administrative office: Bonnyville

Area (2021)
  - Land: 6,005.3 km^{2} (2,318.7 sq mi)

Population (2021)
  - Total: 12,847
  - CSD: 12,760
- Time zone: UTC−06:00 (Alberta Time)
- Postal code: T0A 1S1
- Website: md.bonnyville.ab.ca

The Municipal District of Bonnyville No. 87 is a municipal district (MD) in northeastern Alberta, Canada in Division No. 12. On the east, it is adjacent to the province of Saskatchewan.

The district was incorporated on January 1, 1955, through the merger of the Municipal District of Bonnyville No. 87, the Municipal District of Glendon No. 88 and part of Improvement District No. 101.

On May 1, 2021, the municipal district annexed the adjacent Improvement District No. 349.

== Geography ==
=== Communities and localities ===
The following urban municipalities are surrounded by the MD of Bonnyville No. 87.

Cities

- Cold Lake

Towns

- Bonnyville

Villages

- Glendon

Summer villages

- Bonnyville Beach
- Pelican Narrows

The following hamlets are within the MD of Bonnyville No. 87.

Hamlets

- Ardmore
- Beaver Crossing
- Beaverdam
- Cherry Grove
- Fort Kent
- Iron River
- La Corey
- Therien

The following Métis settlements and Indian reserves are within the MD of Bonnyville No. 87.

Métis settlements

- Elizabeth Metis Settlement
- Fishing Lake Metis Settlement

Indian reserves

- Cold Lake 149

The following localities are within the MD of Bonnyville No. 87.

Localities

- Anshaw
- Bank Bay
- Beacon Corner
- Beaver River
- Big Meadow
- Birch Grove Estates
- Bordenave
- Cherry Ridge Estates
- Columbine
- Dirleton
- Durlingville
- Elizabeth
- Ethel Lake
- Flat Lake
- Fontaine Subdivision
- Franchere
- Fresnoy
- Goodridge
- Gurneyville

- Happy Hollow
- Holyoke
- Hoselaw
- Lessard
- Marie Lake
- Model Development
- Moose Lake Estates
- Muriel Lake
- Nicholson Subdivision
- Northshore Heights
- Rat Lake
- Rife
- Smith Lake
- Sputinow
- Sunset Beach
- Sunset View Beach
- Truman
- Turcotte Division
- Vezeau Beach

== Demographics ==
As a census subdivision n the 2021 Census of Population conducted by Statistics Canada, the MD of Bonnyville No. 87 had a population of 12,847 living in 4,742 of its 5,467 total private dwellings, a change of 0.8% from its 2016 population of 12,745. With a land area of 6,005.3 km^{2} (2,318.7 sq mi), it had a population density of 2.1/km^{2} (5.5/sq mi) in 2021.

As a census subdivision in the 2016 Census of Population conducted by Statistics Canada, the MD of Bonnyville No. 87 originally had a population of 13,575 living in 4,820 of its 5,667 total private dwellings, a 21.3% change from its 2011 population of 11,191. This included the population of two Metis settlements, Elizabeth (653) and Fishing Lake (446), located within the census subdivision that are municipalities independent of the MD of Bonnyville No. 87. Statistics Canada subsequently amended the 2016 census results for Bonnyville No. 87 to a population of 12,760 living in 4,589 of its 5,405 total dwellings, a 14% change from its 2011 population of 11,191. With a land area of 6,064.73 km^{2} (2,341.61 sq mi), it had a population density of 2.1/km^{2} (5.4/sq mi) in 2016. Excluding the two Metis settlements, the MD of Bonnyville No. 87 had a population of 11,661 in 2016, a change of 15.4% from its 2011 population of 10,101.

The population of the MD of Bonnyville No. 87 according to its 2014 municipal census is 11,836, a 17.2% change from its 2011 population of 10,101.

=== Visible minorities and Aboriginals ===
The following is a breakdown of the visible minority and Aboriginal populations of the Bonnyville No. 87 census subdivision that includes the Elizabeth and Fishing Lake Metis settlements.

Visible minority and Aboriginal population (Canada 2006 Census)
| Population group | | Population | % of total population |
|---|---|---|---|
| White | | 8,300 | 81.6% |
| Visible minority group Source: | South Asian | 0 | 0% |
| Visible minority group Source: | Chinese | 0 | 0% |
| Visible minority group Source: | Black | 20 | 0.2% |
| Visible minority group Source: | Filipino | 15 | 0.1% |
| Visible minority group Source: | Latin American | 20 | 0.2% |
| Visible minority group Source: | Arab | 0 | 0% |
| Visible minority group Source: | Southeast Asian | 0 | 0% |
| Visible minority group Source: | West Asian | 0 | 0% |
| Visible minority group Source: | Korean | 0 | 0% |
| Visible minority group Source: | Japanese | 0 | 0% |
| Visible minority group Source: | Visible minority, n.i.e. | 0 | 0% |
| Visible minority group Source: | Multiple visible minority | 0 | 0% |
| Total visible minority population | | 55 | 0.5% |
| Aboriginal group Source: | First Nations | 375 | 3.7% |
| Aboriginal group Source: | Métis | 1,420 | 14% |
| Aboriginal group Source: | Inuit | 0 | 0% |
| Aboriginal group Source: | Aboriginal, n.i.e. | 0 | 0% |
| Aboriginal group Source: | Multiple Aboriginal identity | 10 | 0.1% |
| Total Aboriginal population | | 1,815 | 17.8% |
| Total population | | 10,170 | 100% |

== Notable people ==
Peter Hochachka (1937–2002), zoologist and biochemist, was born in Bordenave

== See also ==
- CFB Cold Lake
- List of communities in Alberta
- List of francophone communities in Alberta
- List of municipal districts in Alberta
