= Dunvegan Yards =

Coordinates: 53.5884°N 113.5615°W

The Dunvegan Yards were rail yards in Edmonton, Alberta, named after, and originally owned by, the Edmonton, Dunvegan and British Columbia Railway. Located just east of the St. Albert Trail and connected to the Grand Trunk Pacific's transcontinental mainline, the yards were the southern terminus of the ED&BC which began construction in 1912, though the yards were not officially surveyed until 1914. The ED&BC, by 1915, reached Grande Prairie in the Peace Country some 400 miles or 640 kilometres northwest from Edmonton, and helped to cement Edmonton as a major Canadian rail hub, opened up the Westlock region to increased settlement, linked northern Alberta economically to the rest of the continent, and earned Edmonton a reputation as "the Gateway to the North".

The ED&BC was not an economic success, however, and was operated by the provincial government of Alberta on a lease after 1920, and was purchased outright by the government in 1925 and merged in the new government-owned Northern Alberta Railways in 1928. Shortly thereafter, the NAR was sold to the Canadian National Railway and Canadian Pacific Railway as co-owners. The NAR became a fixture in northern Alberta for the next several decades, and the Dunvegan Yards were that railway's main hub and connection to the larger rail network. They also became a connector between the CN mainline and the CN-owned Great Slave Lake Railway in the far north of Alberta and southern Northwest Territories in 1964. In 1981, the government-owned Canadian National bought out CP's share in the NAR and merged it into its network. The Dunvegan Yards were closed. At the time of the closure, the boundaries of the yard were

starting on the east side of St. Albert Trail where it is crossed by the railway, north along the Trail to approximately 132 Avenue, then east parallel to 132 Avenue to Sir John Thompson Catholic Junior High School, then south around the school to approximately 127 Avenue and 135 Street, then west to the starting point.

—

Follow the closure the yards were redeveloped into a residential subdivision originally called "Dunvegan Gardens", and now more commonly called simply "Dunvegan", which is officially part of the neighbourhood of Athlone.
