= Widewater, Alberta =

Widewater
- Hamlet
- Location of Widewater Widewater (Canada)
- Coordinates: 55°22′N 115°02′W
- Country: Canada
- Province: Alberta
- Region: Northern Alberta
- Census division: 17
- Municipal district: Municipal District of Lesser Slave River No. 124

Government
  - Type: Unincorporated
  - Governing body: Municipal District of Lesser Slave River No. 124 Council

Area (2021)
  - Land: 3.69 km^{2} (1.42 sq mi)

Population (2021)
  - Total: 405
  - Density: 109.6/km^{2} (284/sq mi)
- Time zone: UTC−06:00 (Alberta Time)
- Area codes: 780, 587, 825

Widewater is a hamlet in northern Alberta, Canada within the Municipal District of Lesser Slave River No. 124. It is located on Highway 2, approximately 225 kilometres (140 mi) northwest of Edmonton.

== Demographics ==
In the 2021 Census of Population conducted by Statistics Canada, Widewater had a population of 405 living in 153 of its 174 total private dwellings, a change of 3.3% from its 2016 population of 392. With a land area of 3.69 km^{2} (1.42 sq mi), it had a population density of 109.8/km^{2} (284.3/sq mi) in 2021.

As a designated place in the 2016 Census of Population conducted by Statistics Canada, Widewater had a population of 348 living in 128 of its 138 total private dwellings, a change of −0.9% from its 2011 population of 351. With a land area of 2.06 km^{2} (0.80 sq mi), it had a population density of 168.9/km^{2} (437.5/sq mi) in 2016.

== See also ==
- List of communities in Alberta
- List of designated places in Alberta
- List of hamlets in Alberta
