= Elk Point, Alberta =

Elk Point
- Town
- Town of Elk Point
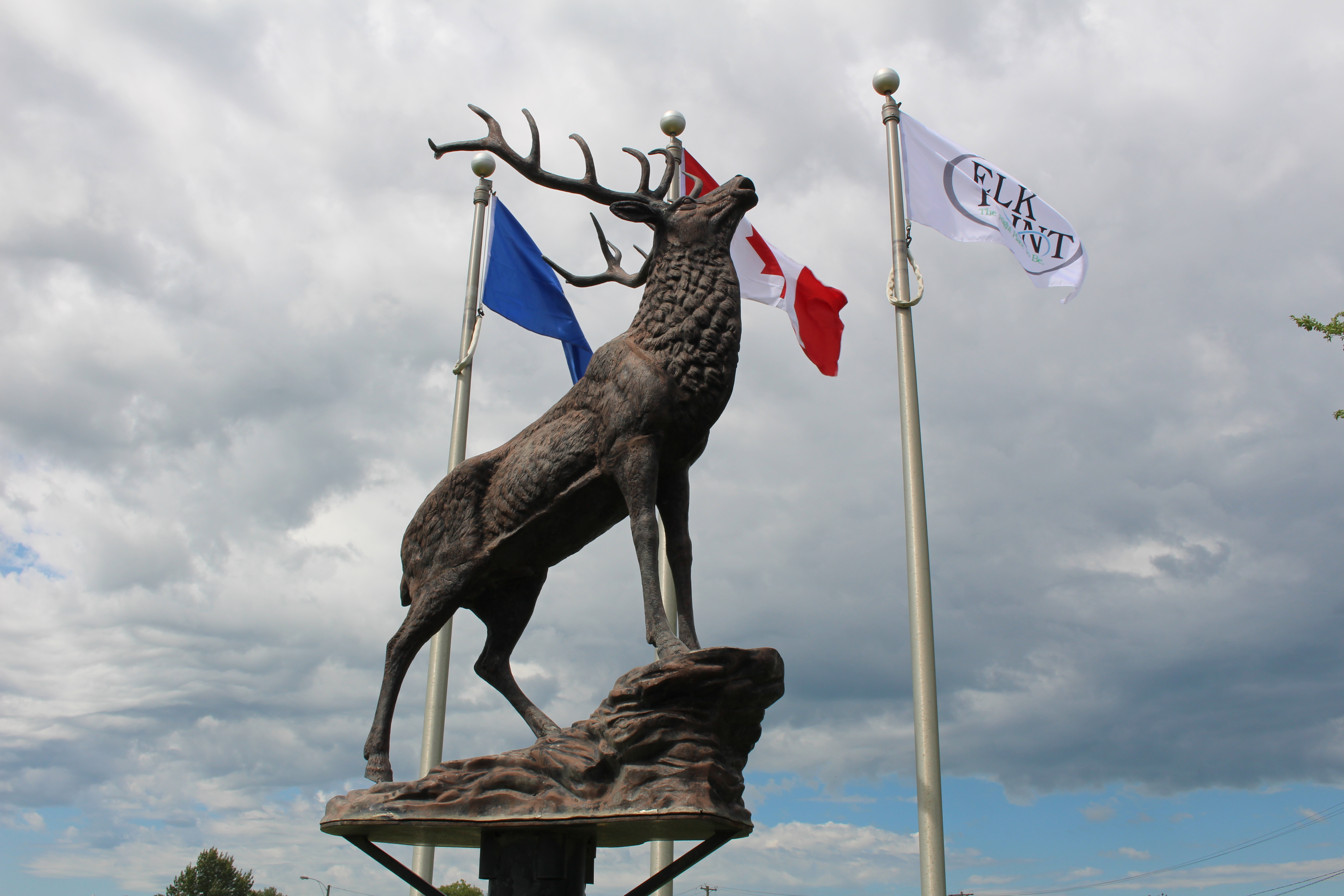

- Location of Elk Point in Alberta Elk Point (Canada) Elk Point (North America)
- Coordinates: 53°53′48″N 110°53′50″W
- Country: Canada
- Province: Alberta
- Region: Northern Alberta
- Census division: 12
- Municipal district: County of St. Paul No. 19
- Incorporated
  - Village: May 31, 1938
  - Town: January 1, 1962

Government
  - Mayor: Wanda Cochrane
  - Governing body: Elk Point Town Council

Area (2021)
  - Land: 4.91 km^{2} (1.90 sq mi)
- Elevation: 598 m (1,962 ft)

Population (2021)
  - Total: 1,399
  - Density: 284.7/km^{2} (737/sq mi)
- Time zone: UTC−06:00 (Alberta Time)
- Postal code span: T0A 1A0
- Area code: +1-780
- Highways: Highway 41; Highway 646
- Waterway: North Saskatchewan River
- Website: Official website

Elk Point is a town located in Eastern Alberta, Canada. It is located on Highway 41.

A number of oil related businesses have located in Elk Point. Agriculture is also important in the Elk Point area.

Elk Point is located on the North Saskatchewan River which was a fur trade route. Both the Hudson's Bay Company and the North West Company had posts on the river near Elk Point from 1792 to 1800. Alberta Culture has built an interpretive centre near the remains of Fort George and Buckingham House.

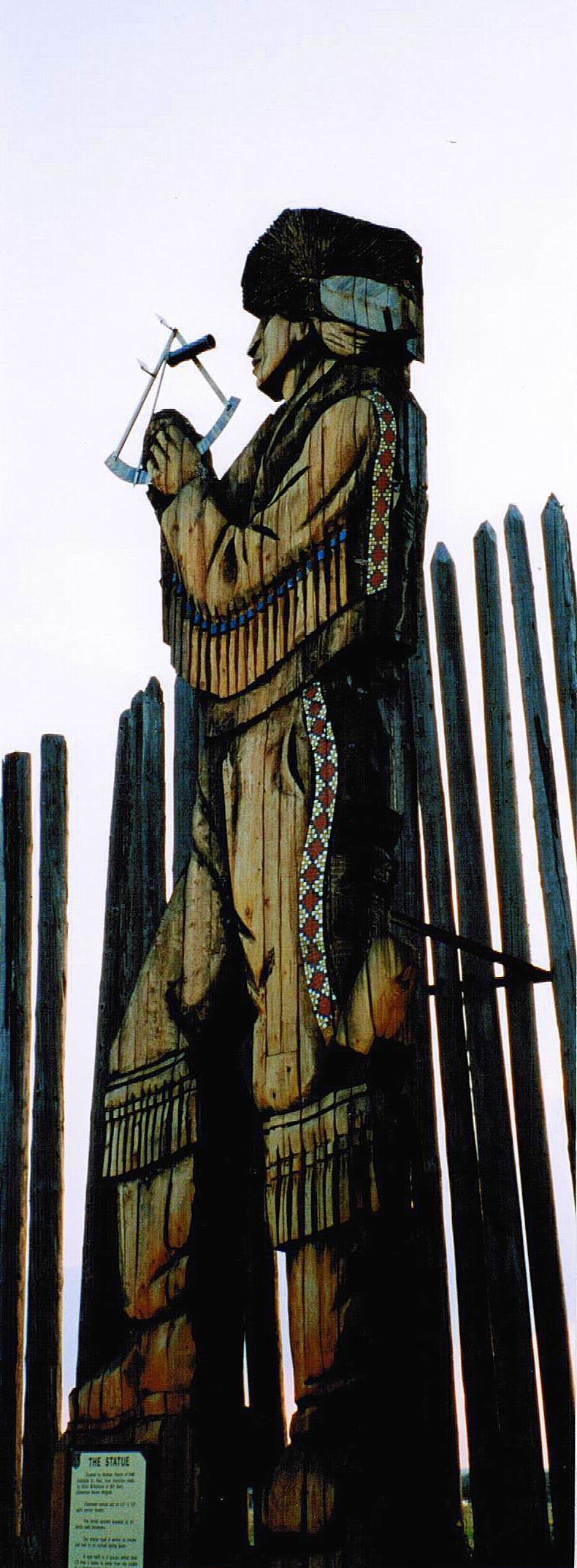
Peter Fidler statue in Elk Point

There is a large carved statue of Peter Fidler (a figure from fur trade days) near Elk Point and a mural of Elk Point history near the town centre. The Iron Horse Trail, a rail trail, is nearby. Elk Point was the site of a fur trading post in the fur trade days.

Elk Point celebrated its centennial on June 30 and July 1, 2007.

== Geography ==
=== Climate ===
Elk Point has a dry continental climate (Köppen climate classification Dfb). The hottest recorded temperature was 38.9 °C (102.0 °F) on July 14, 1941. The coldest recorded temperature was −55.6 °C (−68.1 °F) on December 13, 1911.

Climate data for Elk Point
Month	Jan	Feb	Mar	Apr	May	Jun	Jul	Aug	Sep	Oct	Nov	Dec	Year
Record high °C (°F)	12.8 (55.0)	13 (55)	17.2 (63.0)	31.7 (89.1)	33.9 (93.0)	36.1 (97.0)	38.9 (102.0)	35.5 (95.9)	34 (93)	28.9 (84.0)	18.3 (64.9)	9.4 (48.9)	38.9 (102.0)
Mean daily maximum °C (°F)	−10.8 (12.6)	−6.8 (19.8)	0 (32)	10.4 (50.7)	17.5 (63.5)	21.1 (70.0)	22.8 (73.0)	21.9 (71.4)	16.1 (61.0)	9.8 (49.6)	−2.5 (27.5)	−9.5 (14.9)	7.5 (45.5)
Daily mean °C (°F)	−16.7 (1.9)	−13.1 (8.4)	−6.1 (21.0)	3.7 (38.7)	10.3 (50.5)	14.3 (57.7)	16.2 (61.2)	15 (59)	9.5 (49.1)	3.6 (38.5)	−7.5 (18.5)	−15.1 (4.8)	1.2 (34.2)
Mean daily minimum °C (°F)	−22.6 (−8.7)	−19.4 (−2.9)	−12.2 (10.0)	−2.9 (26.8)	3 (37)	7.4 (45.3)	9.6 (49.3)	8 (46)	2.9 (37.2)	−2.6 (27.3)	−12.4 (9.7)	−20.6 (−5.1)	−5.2 (22.6)
Record low °C (°F)	−55.6 (−68.1)	−49.4 (−56.9)	−41.7 (−43.1)	−40 (−40)	−14.4 (6.1)	−6.7 (19.9)	−5 (23)	−6.7 (19.9)	−13.3 (8.1)	−25 (−13)	−38.3 (−36.9)	−51.2 (−60.2)	−55.6 (−68.1)
Average precipitation mm (inches)	21.1 (0.83)	14.3 (0.56)	17.8 (0.70)	30.1 (1.19)	44.9 (1.77)	75.9 (2.99)	76.5 (3.01)	65.1 (2.56)	38.6 (1.52)	17 (0.7)	18.8 (0.74)	22.2 (0.87)	442.3 (17.41)
Source: Environment Canada

== Demographics ==
In the 2021 Census of Population conducted by Statistics Canada, the Town of Elk Point had a population of 1,399 living in 591 of its 683 total private dwellings, a change of −3.7% from its 2016 population of 1,452. With a land area of 4.91 km^{2} (1.90 sq mi), it had a population density of 284.9/km^{2} (738.0/sq mi) in 2021.

In the 2016 Census of Population conducted by Statistics Canada, the Town of Elk Point recorded a population of 1,452 living in 534 of its 642 total private dwellings, a 2.8% change from its 2011 population of 1,412. With a land area of 4.91 km^{2} (1.90 sq mi), it had a population density of 295.7/km^{2} (765.9/sq mi) in 2016.

The Town of Elk Point's 2012 municipal census counted a population of 1,571, a 3.9% increase over its 2007 municipal census population of 1,512.

== Notable people ==
- Adam Kleeberger - Team Canada rugby player
- Mark Letestu - professional ice hockey player
- Audrey Poitras - president of the Metis Nation of Alberta since 1996
- Sheldon Souray - professional ice hockey player
- Claire Lawrence - a Canadian musician

== See also ==
- List of communities in Alberta
- List of francophone communities in Alberta
- List of towns in Alberta
