= Municipal District of Lesser Slave River No. 124 =

Municipal district in Alberta, Canada

- Municipal district
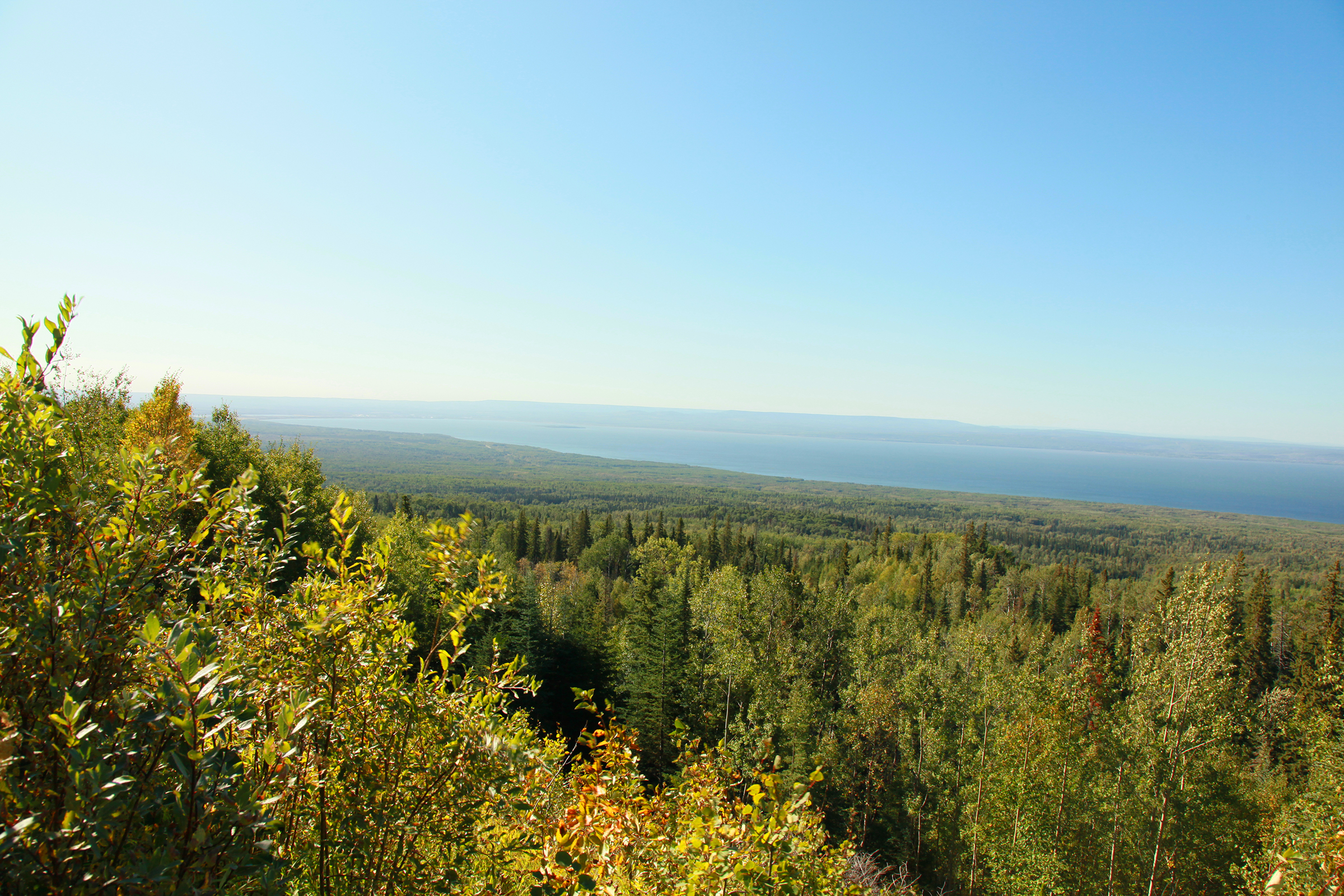
- View from Marten Mountain

- Logo

- Location within Alberta
- Country: Canada
- Province: Alberta
- Region: Northern Alberta
- Census division: 17
- Established: 1993
- Incorporated: 1995

Government
  - Reeve: Murray Kerik
  - Governing body: M.D. of Lesser Slave River Council
  - Administrative office: Slave Lake

Area (2021)
  - Land: 10,041.79 km^{2} (3,877.16 sq mi)

Population (2021)
  - Total: 2,861
  - Density: 0.3/km^{2} (0.78/sq mi)
- Time zone: UTC−06:00 (Alberta Time)
- Website: Official website

The Municipal District of Lesser Slave River No. 124 is a municipal district (MD) in north-central Alberta, Canada. Its municipal office is located in the Town of Slave Lake. Located in Census Division 17, the MD takes its name from Lesser Slave River, which drains Lesser Slave Lake into the Athabasca River.

== Geography ==
=== Communities and localities ===
The following urban municipalities are surrounded by the MD of Lesser Slave River No. 124.

Cities

- none

Towns

- Slave Lake (location of municipal office)

Villages

- none

Summer villages

- none

The following hamlets are located within the MD of Lesser Slave River No. 124.

Hamlets

- Canyon Creek
- Chisholm
- Flatbush
- Marten Beach
- Mitsue Lake Industrial
- Smith
- Wagner
- Widewater

The following localities are located within the MD of Lesser Slave River No. 124.

Localities

- Assineau
- Chisholm Mills
- Decrene
- Hondo
- Kilsyth
- Mitsue
- Moose Portage

- Old Town
- Overlea
- Ranch
- Saulteaux
- Spurfield
- Tieland

Other places

- Port Cornwall

== Demographics ==
In the 2021 Census of Population conducted by Statistics Canada, the MD of Lesser Slave River No. 124 had a population of 2,861 living in 1,169 of its 1,500 total private dwellings, a change of 2.1% from its 2016 population of 2,803. With a land area of 10,041.79 km^{2} (3,877.16 sq mi), it had a population density of 0.3/km^{2} (0.7/sq mi) in 2021.

The population of the Municipal District of Lesser Slave River No. 124 according to its 2019 municipal census is 2,811, a −8.6% change from its 2014 municipal census population of 3,074.

In the 2016 Census of Population conducted by Statistics Canada, the MD of Lesser Slave River No. 124 had a population of 2,803 living in 1,090 of its 1,310 total private dwellings, a −4.3% change from its 2011 population of 2,929. With a land area of 10,074.39 km^{2} (3,889.74 sq mi), it had a population density of 0.3/km^{2} (0.7/sq mi) in 2016.

== Education ==
Southern parts of the MD are within Pembina Hills Public Schools, which formed in 1995 as a merger of three school districts.

== See also ==
- List of communities in Alberta
- List of municipal districts in Alberta
