= Fort Kent, Alberta =

Fort Kent
- Hamlet
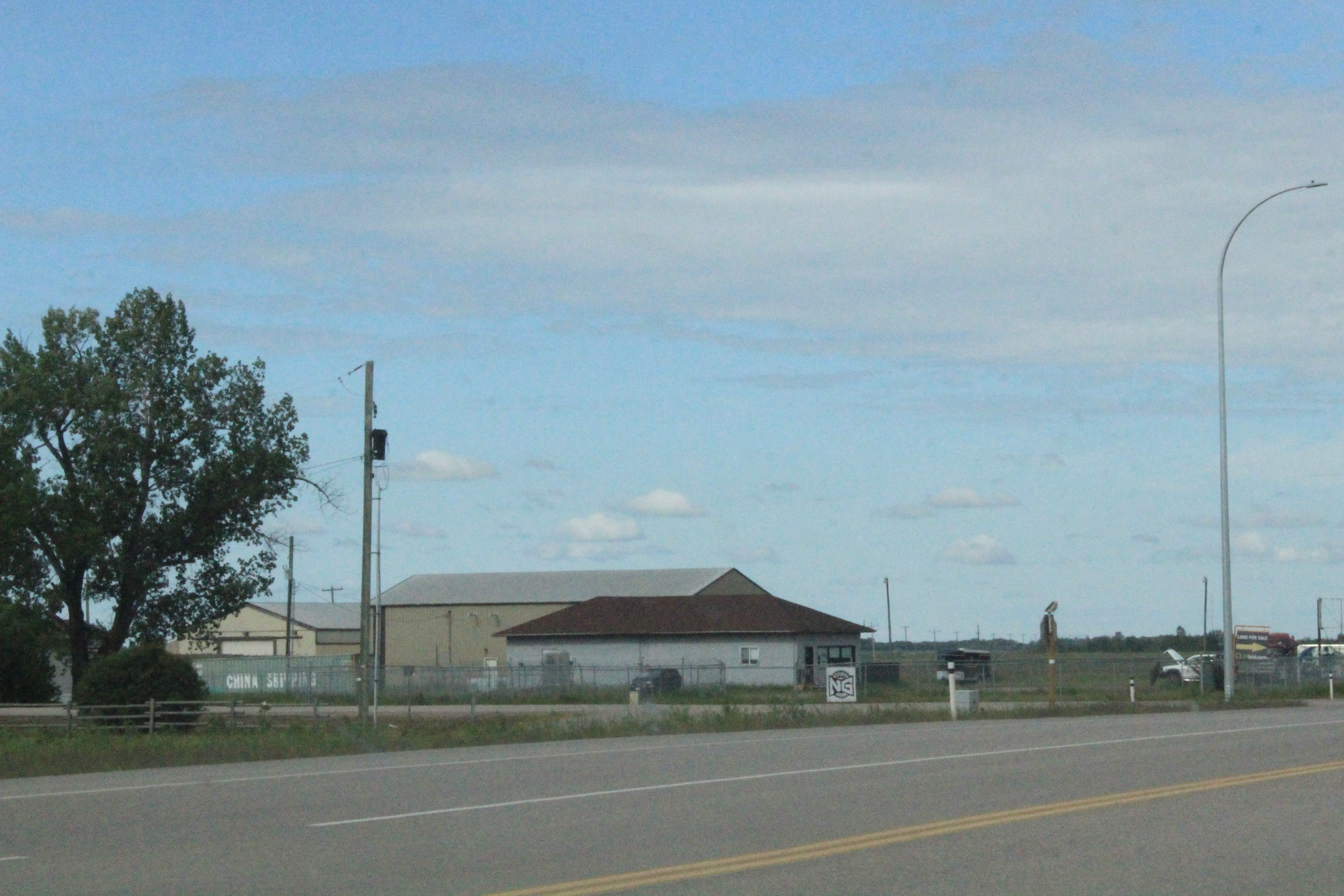

- Location of Fort Kent Fort Kent (Canada)
- Coordinates: 54°18′39″N 110°36′16″W
- Country: Canada
- Province: Alberta
- Region: Northern Alberta
- Census division: 12
- Municipal district: Municipal District of Bonnyville No. 87
- Founded: 1920
- Parish: 1922

Government
  - Type: Unincorporated
  - Governing body: Municipal District of Bonnyville No. 87 Council

Area (2021)
  - Land: 0.64 km^{2} (0.25 sq mi)

Population (2021)
  - Total: 254
  - Density: 396.8/km^{2} (1,028/sq mi)
- Time zone: UTC−06:00 (Alberta Time)
- Area codes: 780, 587, 825
- Highways: Highway 28

Fort Kent is a hamlet in Northern Alberta, Canada within the Municipal District of Bonnyville No. 87, located on Highway 28 approximately 32 kilometres (20 mi) southwest of Cold Lake.

== History ==
The area was first settled by French Canadian families and was originally known as St. Joseph, the name Father Lapointe gave to the church and surrounding district. Because the post office could not be registered under that name, the community was renamed Fort Kent after pioneers who had come from Fort Kent, Maine. A post office opened at NW 30-61-4-W4 between 1921 and 1924.

The first church was built in 1920 by Father Lapointe and local volunteers, after a site at nearby Durlingville was judged too close to Bonnyville. St. Joseph parish was founded in 1922 by Father Louis Connoir, who served as parish priest until 1951; a rectory was built in 1923 and a parish hall in 1927. The original church was demolished in April 1940 and replaced the same year. In 1938 the Sisters of Holy Cross established a mission and school in Fort Kent, which operated until 1971.

Fort Kent had no school until September 1930, when the Durlingville School District opened a one-room class in the parish hall.

The Canadian National Railway reached Bonnyville in 1928 and continued east through Fort Kent to Cold Lake. CN abandoned the line in 1999 and its right-of-way now forms part of the Iron Horse Trail.

== Demographics ==
Population history of Fort Kent
Year	Pop.	±%
1941	140	—
1951	120	−14.3%
1956	168	+40.0%
1961	148	−11.9%
1966	91	−38.5%
1971	113	+24.2%
1976	111	−1.8%
1981	107	−3.6%
1986	202	+88.8%
1991	163	−19.3%
1991A	165	+1.2%
1996	163	−1.2%
2001	163	+0.0%
2006	200	+22.7%
2011	220	+10.0%
2016	191	−13.2%
2016R	261	+36.6%
2021	254	−2.7%
Source: Statistics Canada

In the 2021 Census of Population conducted by Statistics Canada, Fort Kent had a population of 254 living in 97 of its 105 total private dwellings, a change of −2.7% from its 2016 population of 261. With a land area of 0.64 km^{2} (0.25 sq mi), it had a population density of 396.9/km^{2} (1,027.9/sq mi) in 2021.

As a designated place in the 2016 Census of Population conducted by Statistics Canada, Fort Kent had a population of 191 living in 79 of its 91 total private dwellings, a change of −13.2% from its 2011 population of 220. With a land area of 0.34 km^{2} (0.13 sq mi), it had a population density of 561.8/km^{2} (1,455.0/sq mi) in 2016.

== See also ==
- List of communities in Alberta
- List of designated places in Alberta
- List of hamlets in Alberta
