= Flatbush, Alberta =

Flatbush
- Hamlet
- Location of Flatbush Flatbush (Canada)
- Coordinates: 54°41′21″N 114°09′23″W
- Country: Canada
- Province: Alberta
- Region: Northern Alberta
- Census division: 17
- Municipal district: Municipal District of Lesser Slave River No. 124

Government
  - Type: Unincorporated
  - Governing body: Municipal District of Lesser Slave River No. 124 Council

Area (2021)
  - Land: 0.69 km^{2} (0.27 sq mi)

Population (2021)
  - Total: 30
  - Density: 43.5/km^{2} (113/sq mi)
- Time zone: UTC−06:00 (Alberta Time)
- Area codes: 780, 587, 825

Flatbush is a hamlet in northern Alberta, Canada within the Municipal District of Lesser Slave River No. 124. It is located 3 kilometres (1.9 mi) west of Highway 44, approximately 135 kilometres (84 mi) northwest of Edmonton.

== Demographics ==
Population history of Flatbush
Year	Pop.	±%
1941	72	—
1951	66	−8.3%
1956	60	−9.1%
1961	91	+51.7%
1966	62	−31.9%
1971	70	+12.9%
1976	42	−40.0%
1981	33	−21.4%
1986	36	+9.1%
1991	33	−8.3%
1991A	34	+3.0%
1996	38	+11.8%
2001	30	−21.1%
2006	30	+0.0%
2011	30	+0.0%
2016	45	+50.0%
2021	30	−33.3%
Source: Statistics Canada

In the 2021 Census of Population conducted by Statistics Canada, Flatbush had a population of 30 living in 16 of its 19 total private dwellings, a change of −33.3% from its 2016 population of 45. With a land area of 0.69 km^{2} (0.27 sq mi), it had a population density of 43.5/km^{2} (112.6/sq mi) in 2021.

As a designated place in the 2016 Census of Population conducted by Statistics Canada, Flatbush had a population of 45 living in 19 of its 22 total private dwellings, a change of 50% from its 2011 population of 30. With a land area of 0.69 km^{2} (0.27 sq mi), it had a population density of 65.2/km^{2} (168.9/sq mi) in 2016.

== See also ==
- List of communities in Alberta
- List of designated places in Alberta
- List of hamlets in Alberta
