= Wagner, Alberta =

Wagner
- Hamlet
- Location of Wagner Wagner (Canada)
- Coordinates: 55°21′15″N 114°59′08″W
- Country: Canada
- Province: Alberta
- Region: Northern Alberta
- Census division: 17
- Municipal district: Municipal District of Lesser Slave River No. 124

Government
  - Type: Unincorporated
  - Governing body: Municipal District of Lesser Slave River No. 124 Council

Population (1991)
  - Total: 171
- Time zone: UTC−06:00 (Alberta Time)
- Area codes: 780, 587, 825

Wagner is a hamlet in northern Alberta, Canada within the Municipal District of Lesser Slave River No. 124. It is located 0.5 kilometres (0.3 mi) north of Highway 2, approximately 223 kilometres (139 mi) northwest of Edmonton. It has an elevation of 585 m (1,919 ft).

== Demographics ==
Wagner recorded a population of 171 in the 1991 Census of Population conducted by Statistics Canada.

== See also ==
- List of communities in Alberta
- List of hamlets in Alberta
