= Canyon Creek, Alberta =

Canyon Creek
- Hamlet
- Location of Canyon Creek Canyon Creek (Canada)
- Coordinates: 55°22′19″N 115°05′41″W
- Country: Canada
- Province: Alberta
- Region: Northern Alberta
- Census division: 17
- Municipal district: Municipal District of Lesser Slave River No. 124

Government
  - Type: Unincorporated
  - Governing body: Municipal District of Lesser Slave River No. 124 Council

Area (2021)
  - Land: 4.22 km^{2} (1.63 sq mi)

Population (2021)
  - Total: 318
  - Density: 75.4/km^{2} (195/sq mi)
- Time zone: UTC−06:00 (Alberta Time)
- Area codes: 780, 587, 825

Canyon Creek is a hamlet in northern Alberta, Canada within the Municipal District of Lesser Slave River No. 124. It is located on Highway 2, approximately 234 kilometres (145 mi) east of Grande Prairie.

== Demographics ==
Population history of Canyon Creek
Year	Pop.	±%
1941	36	—
1951	232	+544.4%
1956	255	+9.9%
1961	267	+4.7%
1966	250	−6.4%
1971	205	−18.0%
1976	138	−32.7%
1981	145	+5.1%
1986	164	+13.1%
1991	242	+47.6%
1991A	247	+2.1%
1996	243	−1.6%
2001	251	+3.3%
2006	228	−9.2%
2011	259	+13.6%
2016	284	+9.7%
2016R	325	+14.4%
2021	318	−2.2%
Source: Statistics Canada

In the 2021 Census of Population conducted by Statistics Canada, Canyon Creek had a population of 318 living in 117 of its 148 total private dwellings, a change of −2.2% from its 2016 population of 325. With a land area of 4.22 km^{2} (1.63 sq mi), it had a population density of 75.4/km^{2} (195.2/sq mi) in 2021.

As a designated place in the 2016 Census of Population conducted by Statistics Canada, Canyon Creek had a population of 284 living in 103 of its 116 total private dwellings, a change of 9.7% from its 2011 population of 259. With a land area of 1.64 km^{2} (0.63 sq mi), it had a population density of 173.2/km^{2} (448.5/sq mi) in 2016.

== See also ==
- List of communities in Alberta
- List of designated places in Alberta
- List of hamlets in Alberta
