= Slave Lake =

- Town
- Town of Slave Lake
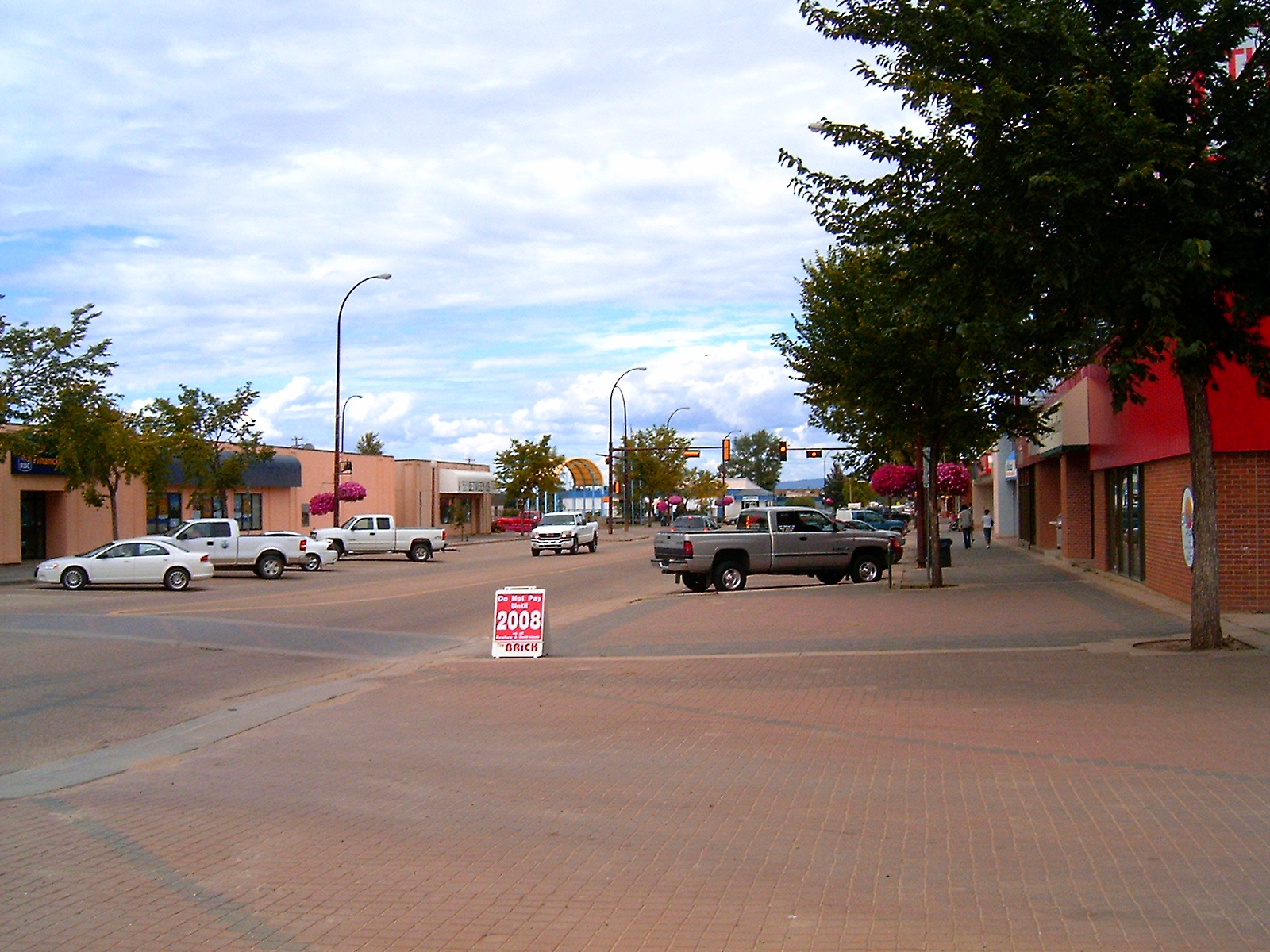
- Main street in August 2006

- Town boundaries

- Location in the M.D. of Lesser Slave River Location in Alberta Slave Lake (Canada) Slave Lake (North America)
- Coordinates: 55°17′07″N 114°46′14″W
- Country: Canada
- Province: Alberta
- Region: Northern Alberta
- Planning region: Upper Athabasca
- Municipal district: Municipal District of Lesser Slave River No. 124
- Incorporated
  - Village: January 1, 1961
  - Town: August 2, 1965

Government
  - Mayor: Francesca Ward
  - Governing body: Slave Lake Town Council
  - Interim CAO: Garry Roth
  - MP: Arnold Viersen (Peace River-Westlock-Cons)
  - MLA: Scott Sinclair (Lesser Slave Lake-UCP)

Area (2021)
  - Land: 14.31 km^{2} (5.53 sq mi)
- Elevation: 590 m (1,940 ft)

Population (2021)
  - Total: 6,836
  - Density: 477.7/km^{2} (1,237/sq mi)
- Time zone: UTC−06:00 (Alberta Time)
- Postal code span: T0G 2A0 & 2S0
- Area codes: 780, 587, 825
- Highways: Highway 2 Bicentennial Highway
- Waterways: Lesser Slave Lake; Lesser Slave River
- Website: slavelake.ca

Slave Lake is a town in northern Alberta, Canada that is surrounded by the Municipal District of Lesser Slave River No. 124. It is approximately 255 km (158 mi) northwest of Edmonton. It is located on the southeast shore of Lesser Slave Lake at the junction of Highway 2 and Highway 88.

Slave Lake serves as a local centre for the area. The administrative office for the Sawridge First Nation is also located in the town.

== History ==
The first European known to visit the area of the present-day Town of Slave Lake was the British explorer David Thompson, who arrived in 1799. Following his brief visit, other British agents established several fur trading posts around Slave Lake, including a Hudson's Bay Company post at the mouth of the lake.

A settlement developed around the post and became known as Sawridge. It was renamed as Slave Lake in 1923. After a flood in the 1930s destroyed much of the town, it was relocated and rebuilt at its current location on higher ground. It was incorporated as a town in 1965.

The Town of Slave Lake was inundated by a flood of Sawridge Creek in July 1988.

=== 2011 wildfire ===
On May 15, 2011, large parts of the town were affected by wildfires in the area. Winds pushed the flames into town, destroying many houses and businesses. Mandatory evacuation orders were issued, but highways had been closed and residents were urged to seek refuge at beaches, large parking lots, and open spaces. Highway 2 had been closed at the outset of the fire, but eventually re-opened for evacuation. Full evacuation of all residents was ordered for Slave Lake.

On May 16, 2011, provincial officials said that 40% of the town had been destroyed or damaged by the fires, including the town hall, the library, a radio station, a mall, and a significant number of homes and other buildings. No injuries or deaths were reported. On May 17, 2011, Mayor Karina Pillay-Kinnee indicated one-third of the town had been destroyed by the wildfire. On May 20, 2011, a firefighting helicopter crashed into the Lesser Slave Lake near Canyon Creek; its pilot died at the scene. It crashed about 30 m (98 ft) off shore into water that was 1.5 m (4.9 ft) deep.

On July 6, Prince William and Catherine, the Duke and Duchess of Cambridge, visited the town to offer encouragement to residents and support for rebuilding efforts.

== Geography ==
=== Climate ===
Slave Lake experiences a subarctic climate (Köppen climate classification Dfc) that borders on a humid continental climate (Köppen Dfb). Summers tend to be mild with cool nights, while winters are long and severely cold.

Climate data for Slave Lake Airport
Month	Jan	Feb	Mar	Apr	May	Jun	Jul	Aug	Sep	Oct	Nov	Dec	Year
Record high °C (°F)	13.6 (56.5)	14.8 (58.6)	17 (63)	28.6 (83.5)	32.5 (90.5)	33.3 (91.9)	32.2 (90.0)	32.3 (90.1)	29.6 (85.3)	28.1 (82.6)	19.1 (66.4)	12.4 (54.3)	33.3 (91.9)
Mean daily maximum °C (°F)	−9.4 (15.1)	−5.9 (21.4)	1.2 (34.2)	9.4 (48.9)	16.1 (61.0)	19.3 (66.7)	21.2 (70.2)	20.3 (68.5)	14.6 (58.3)	9.1 (48.4)	−1.6 (29.1)	−8.2 (17.2)	7.2 (45.0)
Daily mean °C (°F)	−14.5 (5.9)	−11.7 (10.9)	−4.7 (23.5)	3.3 (37.9)	9.7 (49.5)	13.6 (56.5)	15.6 (60.1)	14.6 (58.3)	9.2 (48.6)	3.8 (38.8)	−6.1 (21.0)	−12.9 (8.8)	1.7 (35.1)
Mean daily minimum °C (°F)	−19.6 (−3.3)	−17.4 (0.7)	−10.6 (12.9)	−2.9 (26.8)	3.3 (37.9)	7.9 (46.2)	10.0 (50.0)	8.8 (47.8)	3.7 (38.7)	−1.5 (29.3)	−10.5 (13.1)	−17.7 (0.1)	−3.9 (25.0)
Record low °C (°F)	−42.8 (−45.0)	−42.5 (−44.5)	−38.3 (−36.9)	−26.1 (−15.0)	−7.2 (19.0)	−2.7 (27.1)	2.9 (37.2)	−2.2 (28.0)	−7.8 (18.0)	−21.8 (−7.2)	−36.1 (−33.0)	−42.5 (−44.5)	−42.8 (−45.0)
Average precipitation mm (inches)	24.3 (0.96)	17.3 (0.68)	17.7 (0.70)	21.4 (0.84)	43.5 (1.71)	88.2 (3.47)	95.6 (3.76)	72.5 (2.85)	50.8 (2.00)	27.2 (1.07)	18.9 (0.74)	25.2 (0.99)	502.7 (19.79)
Average rainfall mm (inches)	0.6 (0.02)	1.0 (0.04)	1.7 (0.07)	12.1 (0.48)	40.9 (1.61)	88.2 (3.47)	95.6 (3.76)	72.4 (2.85)	48.8 (1.92)	18.0 (0.71)	3.1 (0.12)	2.0 (0.08)	384.5 (15.14)
Average snowfall cm (inches)	29.9 (11.8)	21.2 (8.3)	20.8 (8.2)	10.4 (4.1)	2.7 (1.1)	0.0 (0.0)	0.0 (0.0)	0.0 (0.0)	2.2 (0.9)	9.7 (3.8)	19.7 (7.8)	29.8 (11.7)	146.5 (57.7)
Average precipitation days (≥ 0.2 mm)	12.0	10.0	9.2	7.1	10.5	14.1	15.0	12.6	12.6	10.0	11.3	12.9	137.3
Average rainy days (≥ 0.2 mm)	0.9	0.9	1.6	4.3	10.1	14.1	15.0	12.6	11.9	7.3	2.6	1.2	82.5
Average snowy days (≥ 0.2 cm)	12.5	10.2	8.6	3.6	1.0	0.0	0.0	0.0	1.0	4.5	10.1	13.0	64.5
Average relative humidity (%) (at 3pm)	76.2	71.3	64.1	51.0	47.5	55.6	59.0	59.9	60.5	59.8	73.7	77.5	63.0
Mean monthly sunshine hours	80.4	112.2	173.3	234.8	281.1	277.7	294.6	260.4	167.9	141.7	84.6	63.1	2,171.8
Percentage possible sunshine	33.3	41.3	47.3	55.4	56.1	53.4	56.5	56.0	43.8	43.5	33.5	28.2	45.7
Source: Environment Canada

== Demographics ==
Federal census population history
Year	Pop.	±%
1961	468	—
1966	1,716	+266.7%
1971	2,052	+19.6%
1976	3,561	+73.5%
1981	4,506	+26.5%
1986	5,429	+20.5%
1991	5,607	+3.3%
1996	6,553	+16.9%
2001	6,600	+0.7%
2006	6,703	+1.6%
2011	6,782	+1.2%
2016	6,651	−1.9%
2021	6,836	+2.8%
Source: Statistics Canada

In the 2021 Census of Population conducted by Statistics Canada, the Town of Slave Lake had a population of 6,836 living in 2,405 of its 2,681 total private dwellings, a change of 2.8% from its 2016 population of 6,651. With a land area of 14.31 km^{2} (5.53 sq mi), it had a population density of 477.7/km^{2} (1,237.3/sq mi) in 2021.

In the 2016 Census of Population conducted by Statistics Canada, the Town of Slave Lake recorded a population of 6,651 living in 2,329 of its 2,762 total private dwellings, a −1.9% change from its 2011 population of 6,782. With a land area of 14.44 km^{2} (5.58 sq mi), it had a population density of 460.6/km^{2} (1,192.9/sq mi) in 2016.

The population of the Town of Slave Lake according to its 2007 municipal census was 7,031.

Panethnic groups in Slave Lake (2001−2021)
Panethnic group	2021		2011		2001	
Panethnic group	Pop.	%	Pop.	%	Pop.	%
European (Note: Statistic includes all persons that did not make up part of a visible minority or an indigenous identity.)	3,595	54.0%	4,485	66.7%	4,480	68.6%
Indigenous	1,780	26.7%	1,690	25.1%	1,770	27.1%
Southeast Asian (Note: Statistic includes total responses of "Filipino" and "Southeast Asian" under visible minority section on census.)	730	10.9%	285	4.2%	25	0.4%
South Asian	215	3.2%	100	1.5%	25	0.4%
Middle Eastern (Note: Statistic includes total responses of "West Asian" and "Arab" under visible minority section on census.)	185	2.8%	145	2.2%	115	1.8%
African	90	1.4%	0	0.0%	15	0.2%
East Asian (Note: Statistic includes total responses of "Chinese", "Korean", and "Japanese" under visible minority section on census.)	30	0.5%	20	0.3%	80	1.2%
Latin American	15	0.2%	0	0.0%	20	0.3%
Other/Multiracial (Note: Statistic includes total responses of "Visible minority, n.i.e." and "Multiple visible minorities" under visible minority section on census.)	20	0.3%	0	0.0%	0	0.0%
Total responses	6,660	97.4%	6,725	99.2%	6,530	98.9%
Total population	6,836	100%	6,782	100%	6,600	100%
Note: Totals greater than 100% due to multiple origin responses

== Sports ==
In 1994, the town hosted the Arctic Winter Games. This is a celebration of circumpolar sports and culture.

Club	League	Sport	Venue	Established	Championships
Slave Lake Wolves	NWJHL	Ice Hockey	Arctic Ice Centre	N/A	1

== Government ==
Residents of Slave Lake are in the electoral district of Peace River—Westlock for elections to the House of Commons of Canada, and Lesser Slave Lake for elections to the Legislative Assembly of Alberta.

== Media ==
Media outlets serving Slave Lake and surrounding area include BOOM (FM) and the Lakeside Leader, a local community newspaper.

== Gallery ==
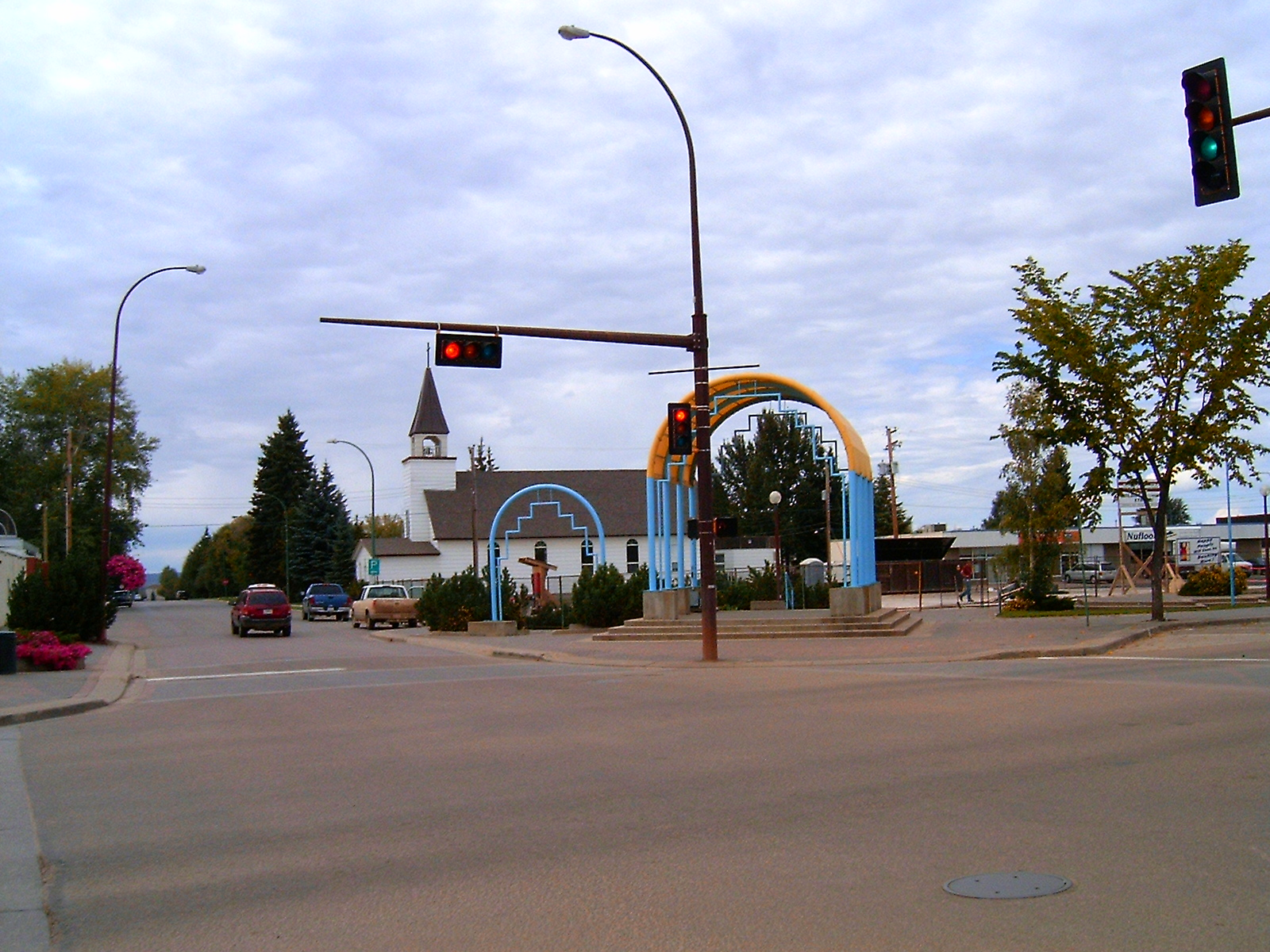
Main Street in 2006

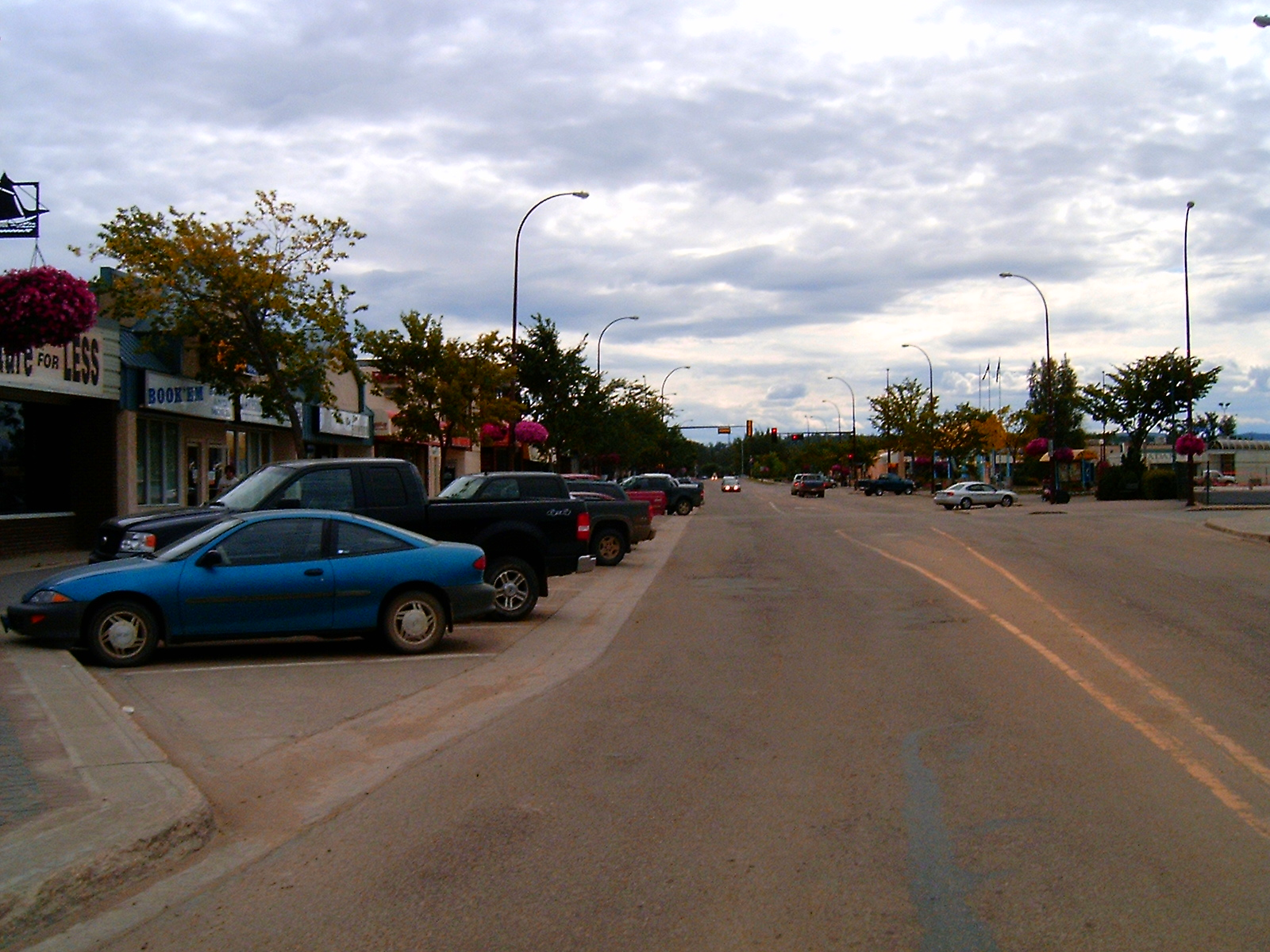
Main Street in 2006

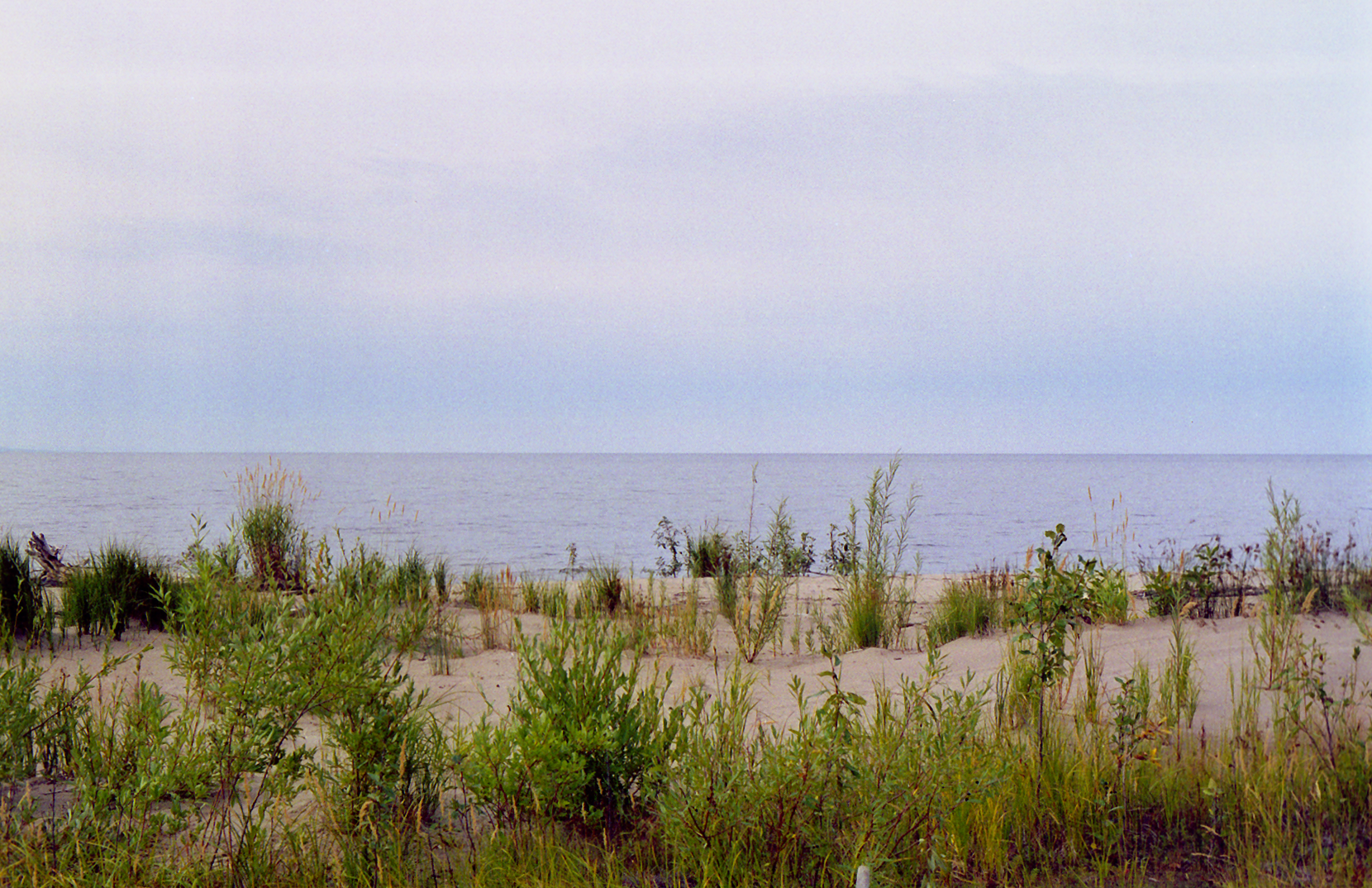
Slave Lake shoreline

== See also ==
- List of communities in Alberta
- List of towns in Alberta
