= List of Canadian tornadoes in 2026 =

Canadian tornadoes of 2026
- Traffic camera still of an EF2 tornado near Rocky Mountain House, Alberta on July 18
- Timespan: May 9 – Present
- Maximum rated tornado: EF3 tornado: Oxbow, Saskatchewan on June 9; Rossburn, Manitoba on June 28; Tulliby Lake, Alberta on July 11
- Tornadoes: 124
- Fatalities: 0

The 2026 Canadian tornado season is the ongoing season of tornadoes and tornado outbreaks across Canada in 2026.

Confirmed tornadoes by Enhanced Fujita rating
EFU	EF0	EF1	EF2	EF3	EF4	EF5	Total
39	29	37	16	3	0	0	124

== Background ==
Canada is one of the most tornado-prone countries on the planet, averaging 60 per year. While most of these are typically brief and weak, some can be violent and very destructive. Tornadoes in Canada most often occur in the Prairies, southern Ontario, and southern Quebec, where the typical tornado season occurs in the summer months.

Data on Canadian tornadoes, in addition to other weather phenomena such as downbursts, is collected by the Northern Tornadoes Project (NTP). The number of recorded tornadoes in Canada has increased significantly in recent years due to their work. In late 2025, an AI tool was introduced to help identify tornadoes that touch down in the remote forests of Canada. The NTP surveys and rates tornadoes and other wind events that occur in Canada; they are rated using a modified version of the Enhanced Fujita Scale (EF-Scale) known as the Canadian Enhanced Fujita Scale (sometimes abbreviation CEF-Scale). (Note: All tornado ratings given by the NTP use the Canadian EF-Scale, even if it is shown as "EF" rather than "CEF".)

== May ==
Confirmed tornadoes by Enhanced Fujita rating
EFU	EF0	EF1	EF2	EF3	EF4	EF5	Total
12	4	1	0	0	0	0	17

=== May 9 event ===
List of confirmed tornadoes – Saturday, May 9, 2026 (Note: All dates are based on the local time zone where the tornado touched down; however, all times are in Coordinated Universal Time for consistency.)
EF#	Location	Region	Province	Start coord.	Time (UTC)	Path length	Max. width
EF0	S of Granton	Middlesex	ON	43.1871°N 81.2824°W	20:05	≥1 km (0.62 mi)	Unknown
EF0	A solar panel was damaged and a truck pulling a trailer along a nearby road was supposedly toppled.						

=== May 17 event ===
List of confirmed tornadoes – Sunday, May 17, 2026
EF#	Location	Region	Province	Start coord.	Time (UTC)	Path length	Max. width
EFU (Note: The NTP rating for a tornado that does no known damage is EF0-default, which is equivalent to EFU on the American EF Scale.)	S of Falun	Wetaskiwin	AB	52.86°N 113.84°W	23:03	Unknown	Unknown
EFU	This landspout caused no damage.						
EFU	E of Crestomere	Ponoka	AB	52.66°N 113.81°W	23:10	Unknown	Unknown
EFU	A landspout was recorded.						
EFU	ENE of Didsbury	Mountain View	AB	51.71°N 113.86°W	23:29	Unknown	Unknown
EFU	This landspout was captured on video as it caused no damage.						
EFU	ESE of Olds	Mountain View	AB	51.74°N 113.93°W	00:45	Unknown	Unknown
EFU	A landspout was photographed over open farmland. No known damage occurred.						

=== May 18 event ===
List of confirmed tornadoes – Monday, May 18, 2026
EF#	Location	Region	Province	Start coord.	Time (UTC)	Path length	Max. width
EFU	WSW of Olds	Mountain View	AB	51.785°N 114.16°W	18:50	Unknown	Unknown
EFU	This landspout was photographed and recorded on the outskirts of Olds. No damage was noted.						
EFU	ESE of Garfield	Mountain View	AB	51.57°N 114.34°W	23:15	Unknown	Unknown
EFU	A landspout caused no damage.						
EFU	SE of Crestomere	Ponoka	AB	52.61°N 113.8°W	23:15	Unknown	Unknown
EFU	This landspout was recorded to the east of Gull Lake. No damage was reported.						
EFU	N of Blackfalds	Lacombe	AB	52.43°N 113.81°W	23:21	Unknown	Unknown
EFU	A landspout was observed over open land.						
EFU	W of Ponoka	Ponoka	AB	52.676°N 113.67°W	23:38	Unknown	Unknown
EFU	This landspout was captured in an open field just to the west of Highway 2.						

=== May 19 event ===
List of confirmed tornadoes – Tuesday, May 19, 2026
EF#	Location	Region	Province	Start coord.	Time (UTC)	Path length	Max. width
EFU	WNW of Heisler	Flagstaff	AB	52.68°N 112.28°W	19:40	Unknown	Unknown
EFU	A landspout was photographed over open fields.						
EF0	SSE of Strathroy-Caradoc to SW of Middlesex Centre	Middlesex	ON	42.8518°N 81.5513°W	21:30–?	7.87 km (4.89 mi)	300 m (330 yd)
EF0	A farm outbuilding and trees were damaged.						
EF1	London to SSE of Thames Centre	Middlesex	ON	42.9117°N 81.3402°W	21:45–?	26.2 km (16.3 mi)	600 m (660 yd)
EF1	This tornado damaged power poles, trees, houses and several farm buildings. A transport truck was also toppled.						
EF0	S of Ingersoll to NW of Norwich	Oxford	ON	42.9874°N 80.8983°W	22:10–?	16.7 km (10.4 mi)	400 m (440 yd)
EF0	A house and a barn suffered minor damage. Trees were also damaged.						

=== May 22 event ===
List of confirmed tornadoes – Friday, May 22, 2026
EF#	Location	Region	Province	Start coord.	Time (UTC)	Path length	Max. width
EFU	S of Disley	Lumsden	SK	50.58°N 105.06°W	19:30		
EFU	A landspout was captured on video over a field. No damage occurred.						

=== May 25 event ===
List of confirmed tornadoes – Monday, May 25, 2026
EF#	Location	Region	Province	Start coord.	Time (UTC)	Path length	Max. width
EF0	SSE of Saint-Thomas-Didyme	Maria-Chapdelaine	QC	48.895°N 72.653°W	22:13–?	0.78 km (0.48 mi)	Unknown
EF0	A tree was snapped, a home lost some shingles from its roof and a recreational trailer was knocked over.						

=== May 31 event ===
List of confirmed tornadoes – Sunday, May 31, 2026
EF#	Location	Region	Province	Start coord.	Time (UTC)	Path length	Max. width
EFU	SSE of Laporte	Chesterfield	SK	51.14°N 109.47°W	19:37	Unknown	Unknown
EFU	A funnel cloud briefly touched down and caused no damage.						

== June ==
Confirmed tornadoes by Enhanced Fujita rating
EFU	EF0	EF1	EF2	EF3	EF4	EF5	Total
10	8	15	3	2	0	0	38

=== June 2 event ===
List of confirmed tornadoes – Tuesday, June 2, 2026
EF#	Location	Region	Province	Start coord.	Time (UTC)	Path length	Max. width
EF0	ENE of Douglas to E of Ingelow	North Cypress-Langford	MB	49.9126°N 99.6204°W	20:40–?	9.68 km (6.01 mi)	410 m (450 yd)
EF0	This weak tornado caused minor damage to the roof of a garage. Fences and trees were also damaged.						
EF0	W of Darlingford	Pembina	MB	49.2149°N 98.4664°W	21:24–?	2.21 km (1.37 mi)	120 m (130 yd)
EF0	A tornado damaged some trees and did some ground scouring in a field.						
EFU	ESE of Sperling	Morris	MB	49.49°N 97.61°W	22:50	Unknown	Unknown
EFU	This tornado was photographed. No damage occurred.						

=== June 7 event ===
List of confirmed tornadoes – Sunday, June 7, 2026
EF#	Location	Region	Province	Start coord.	Time (UTC)	Path length	Max. width
EF1	SE of Glen Ewen	Mount Pleasant	SK	49.137°N 102.0029°W	02:10–?	6.83 km (4.24 mi)	240 m (260 yd)
EF1	A recreational trailer, a house, trees and power poles were damaged.						
EF1	SSW of Hirsch to NNW of Frobisher	Coalfields, Browning	SK	49.1471°N 102.6132°W	02:15–?	17.7 km (11.0 mi)	810 m (890 yd)
EF1	This tornado caused damage to several grain bins and trees. Multiple power poles were snapped. Minor damage occurred to a home, a shed, and two outbuildings.						
EF1	WNW of Carnduff to SSE of Alida	Mount Pleasant, Reciprocity	SK	49.2061°N 101.8873°W	02:20–?	11.3 km (7.0 mi)	780 m (850 yd)
EF1	A farm outbuilding was completely destroyed and trees were damaged.						

=== June 9 event ===
List of confirmed tornadoes – Tuesday, June 9, 2026
EF#	Location	Region	Province	Start coord.	Time (UTC)	Path length	Max. width
EFU	SW of St-Pierre-Jolys	De Salaberry	MB	49.38°N 97.14°E	20:40	Unknown	Unknown
EFU	This tornado caused no damage.						
EFU	N of Ste. Anne	Taché	MB	49.715°N 96.65°E	00:15	Unknown	Unknown
EFU	A tornado was recorded. No damage occurred.						
EF3	E of North Portal to S of Oxbow	Coalfields, Enniskillen	SK	49°N 102.4565°E	00:55–?	32 km (20 mi)	560 m (610 yd)
EF3	This intense tornado tracked northeast primarily across rural land but still caused significant damage to a farmstead where a home and an outbuilding were destroyed. Grain bins, multiple vehicles, and trees were also damaged, while additional damage along the path included snapped power poles, damage to a pump jack at a battery site, and scattered tree and minor structural damage. Damage continued to the U.S. border, but the extent of the tornado's path into North Dakota could not be surveyed.						

=== June 12 event ===
List of confirmed tornadoes – Friday, June 12, 2026
EF#	Location	Region	Province	Start coord.	Time (UTC)	Path length	Max. width
EF0	E of Dresdento NNW of Thamesville	Chatham-Kent, Lambton	ON	42.6032°N 82.0739°W	06:00–?	4.8 km (3.0 mi)	150 m (160 yd)
EF0	This weak tornado damaged an outbuilding and crops.						

=== June 15 event ===
List of confirmed tornadoes – Monday, June 15, 2026
EF#	Location	Region	Province	Start coord.	Time (UTC)	Path length	Max. width
EF0	WNW of Hines Creek	Clear Hills	AB	56.2754°N 118.8039°W	23:08–?	2.73 km (1.70 mi)	330 m (360 yd)
EF0	This weak tornado damaged some trees.						
EF1	NNW of Eaglesham	Birch Hills	AB	55.8869°N 117.9549°W	01:00–?	2.73 km (1.70 mi)	290 m (320 yd)
EF1	This tornado tracked through forested areas, damaging trees.						
EF1	NE of Eaglesham to NW of Tangent	Birch Hills	AB	55.8558°N 117.8169°W	01:18–?	2.05 km (1.27 mi)	230 m (250 yd)
EF1	A tornado caused damage to trees.						
EF2	NE of Culp to Girouxville	Smoky River	AB	55.7754°N 117.4802°W	02:03–?	11.1 km (6.9 mi)	600 m (660 yd)
EF2	A strong tornado tracked southeast through primarily farmland before striking Girouxville. Homes and small buildings suffered structural damage throughout town along with some trees also being damaged. A few farmsteads before town were also damaged.						
EF0	SW of Harmon Valley	Northern Sunrise	AB	56.0649°N 116.9448°W	02:27–?	6.13 km (3.81 mi)	140 m (150 yd)
EF0	Trees were damaged.						
EF0	SSE of Falher	Smoky River	AB	55.7088°N 117.1835°W	02:30	Unknown	Unknown
EF0	Sporadic tree damage occurred.						
EFU	S of McLennan	Smoky River	AB	55.66°N 116.92°W	02:55	Unknown	Unknown
EFU	A tornado was recorded over open farmland.						
EF1	NE of Enilda	Big Lakes	AB	55.4535°N 116.324°W	03:42–?	7.6 km (4.7 mi)	200 m (220 yd)
EF1	A recreational trailer and a fence were damaged along with trees.						

=== June 16 event ===
List of confirmed tornadoes – Tuesday, June 16, 2026
EF#	Location	Region	Province	Start coord.	Time (UTC)	Path length	Max. width
EFU	S of Tilley (1st tornado)	Newell	AB	50.41°N 111.64°W	20:51	Unknown	Unknown
EFU	A brief tornado was photographed and recorded. No damage occurred.						
EFU	SE of Tilley	Newell	AB	50.39°N 111.58°W	21:01	Unknown	Unknown
EFU	A tornado was reported but no damage was found.						
EFU	N of Seven Persons	Cypress	AB	49.91°N 110.9°W	21:45	Unknown	Unknown
EFU	This tornado was photographed as it did no damage.						

=== June 18 event ===
List of confirmed tornadoes – Thursday, June 18, 2026
EF#	Location	Region	Province	Start coord.	Time (UTC)	Path length	Max. width
EF1	S of Gore	Argenteuil	QC	45.7231°N 74.2765°W	18:30–?	5.18 km (3.22 mi)	370 m (400 yd)
EF1	This tornado tracked through forested terrain damaging numerous trees.						
EFU	NW of Viceroy	Excel	SK	49.5°N 105.47°W	21:08	Unknown	Unknown
EFU	A landspout was observed over open country.						

=== June 25 event ===
List of confirmed tornadoes – Thursday, June 25, 2026
EF#	Location	Region	Province	Start coord.	Time (UTC)	Path length	Max. width
EF1	W of Southwest Middlesex	Middlesex	ON	42.7605°N 81.7604°W	21:47–?	9.6 km (6.0 mi)	250 m (270 yd)
EF1	This tornado damaged multiple aged barns, a few recreational trailers, and numerous trees. Minor damage also occurred to homes.						

=== June 26 event ===
List of confirmed tornadoes – Friday, June 26, 2026
EF#	Location	Region	Province	Start coord.	Time (UTC)	Path length	Max. width
EF0	E of Petitcodiac	Westmorland	NB	45.9316°N 65.0889°W	23:39–?	0.6 km (0.37 mi)	60 m (66 yd)
EF0	Minor tree damage occurred.						

=== June 28 event ===
List of confirmed tornadoes – Sunday, June 28, 2026
EF#	Location	Region	Province	Start coord.	Time (UTC)	Path length	Max. width
EFU	NNE of Stornoway	Cote	SK	51.4°N 101.95°W	21:21	Unknown	Unknown
EFU	This tornado caused no damage.						
EF2	N of Kamsack to W of Pelly	St. Philips	SK	51.674°N 101.929°W	23:40–?	22.2 km (13.8 mi)	1,050 m (1,150 yd)
EF2	This strong tornado tracked northward damaging homes and barns on several properties. Multiple power poles were snapped and numerous trees were damaged as well.						
EF1	Pelly	St. Philips	SK	51.8365°N 101.9467°W	00:11–?	3.4 km (2.1 mi)	100 m (110 yd)
EF1	A tornado moved directly into Pelly, inflicting damage to multiple homes and trees throughout the village.						
EF3	SSE of Rossburn	Prairie View, Rossburn	MB	50.53°N 100.8077°W	00:58–?	13.8 km (8.6 mi)	680 m (740 yd)
EF3	An intense tornado caused major damage to a farmstead, tearing the roof and some second story walls off a home, damaged a barn and outbuildings, and snapped or uprooted numerous trees.						
EF1	NW of Inglis to S of Roblin	Riding Mountain West	MB	51.0324°N 101.3632°W	01:05–?	8.91 km (5.54 mi)	630 m (690 yd)
EF1	A tornado damaged trees and buildings at a farm property east of Shellmouth Reservoir. Additional outbuildings and grain bins were damaged along the path, while a home sustained minor damage.						
EF1	N of Olha (1st tornado)	Rossburn, Riding Mountain	MB	50.7691°N 100.6228°W	01:40–?	7.08 km (4.40 mi)	330 m (360 yd)
EF1	This tornado moved through forested areas within eastern portions of Riding Mountain National Park. Trees were damaged.						
EF2	N of Olha (2nd tornado)	Riding Mountain	MB	50.8353°N 100.5599°W	01:52–?	6.79 km (4.22 mi)	440 m (480 yd)
EF2	This strong tornado moved through Riding Mountain National Park causing significant tree damage.						

=== June 29 event ===
List of confirmed tornadoes – Monday, June 29, 2026
EF#	Location	Region	Province	Start coord.	Time (UTC)	Path length	Max. width
EFU	SE of Elrose	Monet	SK	51.4°N 107.91°W	00:00	Unknown	Unknown
EFU	A tornado was recorded over open fields.						
EF1	Southern Winnipeg	Winnipeg	MB	49.809°N 97.2195°W	02:51–?	6.45 km (4.01 mi)	200 m (220 yd)
EF1	This tornado moved through southern portions of Winnipeg causing damage to homes, businesses and trees.						

=== June 30 event ===
List of confirmed tornadoes – Tuesday, June 30, 2026
EF#	Location	Region	Province	Start coord.	Time (UTC)	Path length	Max. width
EF1	W of South Frontenac	Frontenac, Kingston	ON	44.464°N 76.7289°W	16:35–?	18.2 km (11.3 mi)	510 m (560 yd)
EF1	Several farms and numerous trees were damaged.						
EF0	Kingston	Kingston	ON	44.302°N 76.5386°W	16:50–?	10.9 km (6.8 mi)	250 m (270 yd)
EF0	A weak tornado caused damage throughout areas of Kingston.						
EF1	Northern Sudbury	Greater Sudbury	ON	46.857°N 81.0623°W	21:12–?	4.32 km (2.68 mi)	350 m (380 yd)
EF1	Trees were damaged in forested areas.						
EF1	SW of Addington Highlands	Lennox and Addington	ON	45.0973°N 77.3748°W	01:15–?	2.39 km (1.49 mi)	230 m (250 yd)
EF1	This tornado damaged trees along the western shores of Ashby Lake.						

== July ==
Confirmed tornadoes by Enhanced Fujita rating
EFU	EF0	EF1	EF2	EF3	EF4	EF5	Total
8	10	8	9	1	0	0	36

=== July 1 event ===
List of confirmed tornadoes – Wednesday, July 1, 2026
EF#	Location	Region	Province	Start coord.	Time (UTC)	Path length	Max. width
EF2	NNW of Sainte-Anne-du-Lac	Antoine-Labelle, La Vallée-de-la-Gatineau	QC	47.2643°N 75.6943°W	19:25–?	10.5 km (6.5 mi)	930 m (1,020 yd)
EF2	This strong tornado moved through dense forest causing significant damage to trees. A scar left by the tornado was noted on satellite imagery.						

=== July 2 event ===
List of confirmed tornadoes – Thursday, July 2, 2026
EF#	Location	Region	Province	Start coord.	Time (UTC)	Path length	Max. width
EFU	SE of Coleville	Oakdale	SK	51.63°N 109.06°W	21:25	Unknown	Unknown
EFU	A tornado was observed that caused no damage.						
EF1	SE of Denzil	Eye Hill	SK	52.1925°N 109.6045°W	00:25–?	0.56 km (0.35 mi)	50 m (55 yd)
EF1	A brief tornado struck a farmstead, damaging grain bins, a barn, farm equipment and trees.						

=== July 3 event ===
List of confirmed tornadoes – Friday, July 3, 2026
EF#	Location	Region	Province	Start coord.	Time (UTC)	Path length	Max. width
EFU	E of Springwater	Biggar	SK	51.97°N 108.27°W	20:15	Unknown	Unknown
EFU	This tornado was photographed. No damage occurred.						
EFU	SE of Edam	Turtle River	SK	53.166°N 108.738°W	22:00	Unknown	Unknown
EFU	A tornado remained over fields causing no damage.						

=== July 6 event ===
List of confirmed tornadoes – Monday, July 6, 2026
EF#	Location	Region	Province	Start coord.	Time (UTC)	Path length	Max. width
EF2	W of Kenora	Kenora	ON	49.733°N 94.8627°W	18:35–?	6.23 km (3.87 mi)	700 m (770 yd)
EF2	A strong tornado moved through forested areas with a scar being noted on satellite imagery.						

=== July 8 event ===
List of confirmed tornadoes – Wednesday, July 8, 2026
EF#	Location	Region	Province	Start coord.	Time (UTC)	Path length	Max. width
EF2	SSW of Paradise Valley to SSW of McLaughlin	Vermilion River, Wainwright	AB	52.934°N 110.3618°W	01:30–?	9.23 km (5.74 mi)	570 m (620 yd)
EF2	A strong tornado tracked southeastward through the Battle River valley. It struck two properties, destroying a mobile home and damaging trees, a shop and vehicles.						
EF2	SSE of Chauvin, AB to NW of Senlac, SK	Wainwright (AB), Senlac (SK)	AB, SK	52.5888°N 110.0744°W	02:02–?	13.8 km (8.6 mi)	640 m (700 yd)
EF2	This tornado moved through the northern portion of Dillberry Lake Provincial Park, causing significant damage to trees, camping trailers, vehicles, and a wellhouse. Five people were injured.						

=== July 10 event ===
List of confirmed tornadoes – Friday, July 10, 2026
EF#	Location	Region	Province	Start coord.	Time (UTC)	Path length	Max. width
EF1	Speers	Douglas	SK	52.6947°N 107.5891°W	21:25–?	7.98 km (4.96 mi)	1,080 m (1,180 yd)
EF1	This tornado moved through Speers, damaging buildings and trees. Multiple farms were also damaged to the south and east of town.						
EFU	SSW of Dundurn	Dundurn	SK	51.78°N 106.53°W	21:58	Unknown	Unknown
EFU	A tornado was photographed. No damage was found.						
EF1	S of Krydor	Redberry	SK	52.6757°N 107.1025°W	22:05–?	6.03 km (3.75 mi)	760 m (830 yd)
EF1	A tornado touched down on the eastern shore of Redberry Lake and struck a property, damaging trees, a home and a garage.						
EF1	NW of Hepburn to Waldheim	Blaine Lake, Laird, Rosthern	SK	52.6404°N 106.9091°W	22:21–?	24.6 km (15.3 mi)	950 m (1,040 yd)
EF1	A tornado began west of the North Saskatchewan River and crossed it, mainly damaging trees across rural areas. The tornado then moved into Waldheim, inflicting damage to businesses, homes, power poles, vehicles, and trees throughout the town. It exited the town and dissipated over open fields shortly afterwards.						
EF0	NW of Prud'homme	Grant	SK	52.3608°N 105.9349°W	23:35–?	1.79 km (1.11 mi)	50 m (55 yd)
EF0	A weak tornado damaged some fencing.						
EF0	S of Plunkett	Viscount	SK	51.8697°N 105.4639°W	23:40–?	2.16 km (1.34 mi)	250 m (270 yd)
EF0	A farm and trees were damaged.						
EF1	ENE of Fenton	Prince Albert, Birch Hills	SK	53.0259°N 105.5344°W	00:45–?	2.19 km (1.36 mi)	70 m (77 yd)
EF1	This tornado moved through forested areas on either side of the South Saskatchewan River, damaging trees.						
EF0	NNE of Cupar to NNW of Dysart	Cupar	SK	51.0433°N 104.1485°W	02:35–?	2.92 km (1.81 mi)	90 m (98 yd)
EF0	A tornado damaged a horse corral and trees.						
EFU	N of Cupar	Cupar	SK	51.06°N 104.21°W	02:36	Unknown	Unknown
EFU	No damage was reported as this tornado remained over fields.						
EF0	SSE of Leross	Kellross	SK	51.244°N 103.863°W	02:38–?	2.91 km (1.81 mi)	70 m (77 yd)
EF0	A weak tornado damaged trees and crops.						
EF0	N of Leross	Kellross	SK	51.33°N 103.847°W	02:45–?	1.21 km (0.75 mi)	40 m (44 yd)
EF0	Minor damage occurred to crops and trees.						
EFU	NNE of Lipton	Lipton	SK	51.04°N 103.74°W	03:28	Unknown	Unknown
EFU	A tornado remained over open country causing no damage.						

=== July 11 event ===
List of confirmed tornadoes – Saturday, July 11, 2026
EF#	Location	Region	Province	Start coord.	Time (UTC)	Path length	Max. width
EF3	N of Tulliby Lake	Vermilion River	AB	53.7083°N 110.2496°W	23:32–?	17.5 km (10.9 mi)	450 m (490 yd)
EF3	This intense tornado struck and did significant damage to a residential property. Trees and several other properties were also damaged.						
EF1	WSW of Little Fishing Lake	Loon Lake	SK	53.8132°N 109.8246°W	00:05–?	4.37 km (2.72 mi)	290 m (320 yd)
EF1	A tornado tracked through forested areas east of within Bronson Forest Recreation Site.						
EFU	SW of Glaslyn	Parkdale	SK	53.32°N 108.4°W	01:20	Unknown	Unknown
EFU	A tornado was photographed. No damage occurred.						
EFU	SSW of Glaslyn	Parkdale	SK	53.31°N 108.38°W	01:22	Unknown	Unknown
EFU	This tornado remained over fields and did no damage.						
EF0	SSE of Birch Lake	Medstead	SK	53.3946°N 108.0206°W	01:50–?	6.31 km (3.92 mi)	230 m (250 yd)
EF0	This weak tornado damaged a shop, trees, and a fence at a farmstead.						
EF0	W of Spiritwood	Spiritwood	SK	53.3649°N 107.5657°W	02:15–?	1.18 km (0.73 mi)	70 m (77 yd)
EF0	Some trees were damaged.						
EF1	E of Lanz Point	Round Hill	SK	53.022°N 108.1064°W	02:30–?	6.07 km (3.77 mi)	350 m (380 yd)
EF1	A tornado damaged trees and the roof of a home.						
EF0	E of Spiritwood (1st tornado)	Spiritwood	SK	53.3438°N 107.4268°W	02:30–?	2.02 km (1.26 mi)	160 m (170 yd)
EF0	Minor tree damage occurred.						
EF0	E of Spiritwood (2nd tornado)	Spiritwood	SK	53.3615°N 107.3212°W	02:40–?	1.9 km (1.2 mi)	150 m (160 yd)
EF0	This tornado damaged a grain bin and trees.						

=== July 17 event ===
List of confirmed tornadoes – Friday, July 17, 2026
EF#	Location	Region	Province	Start coord.	Time (UTC)	Path length	Max. width
EF2	S of Coalspur	Yellowhead	AB	53.0368°N 116.9942°W	22:58–?	10.3 km (6.4 mi)	940 m (1,030 yd)
EF2	A strong tornado moved through forests causing significant tree damage.						

=== July 18 event ===
List of confirmed tornadoes – Saturday, July 18, 2026
EF#	Location	Region	Province	Start coord.	Time (UTC)	Path length	Max. width
EF2	Southern Rocky Mountain House	Clearwater	AB	52.3401°N 114.9619°W	00:18–?	7.43 km (4.62 mi)	1,040 m (1,140 yd)
EF2	This strong tornado developed south of Rocky Mountain House and moved into the southern outskirts of the city. Several properties were damaged, including to homes, garages, outbuildings, barns, vehicles, and trees.						
EF2	E of Rocky Mountain House to WNW of Leslieville	Clearwater	AB	52.3841°N 114.8719°W	00:36–?	10.6 km (6.6 mi)	600 m (660 yd)
EF2	A strong tornado inflicted damage to homes, barns and outbuildings. Numerous trees were damaged as well.						

=== July 21 event ===
List of confirmed tornadoes – Tuesday, July 21, 2026
EF#	Location	Region	Province	Start coord.	Time (UTC)	Path length	Max. width
EFU	SSE of Salluit	Kativik	QC	61.64°N 74.75°W	14:15	Unknown	Unknown
EFU	A brief tornado was photographed and recorded.						
EF1	NNW of Grenville to SSE of Huberdeau	Argenteuil	QC	45.7754°N 74.6579°W	21:30–?	14.5 km (9.0 mi)	1,080 m (1,180 yd)
EF1	A tornado tracked through populated forested areas, damaging trees, power poles, and several buildings including barns, homes and a shed.						
EF0	S of Saint-Donat	Matawinie	QC	46.2896°N 74.1974°W	22:40–?	0.94 km (0.58 mi)	110 m (120 yd)
EF0	A few trees were damaged.						

=== July 28 event ===
List of confirmed tornadoes – Tuesday, July 28, 2026
EF#	Location	Region	Province	Start coord.	Time (UTC)	Path length	Max. width
EF2	NNW of Iron River	Bonnyville	AB	54.6852°N 111.163°W	04:05–?	2.84 km (1.76 mi)	340 m (370 yd)
EF2	A strong tornado damaged trees in forested areas east of Seibert Lake.						
EF2	NW of Iron River	Lac La Biche, Bonnyville	AB	54.7509°N 111.2589°W	04:05–?	7.17 km (4.46 mi)	410 m (450 yd)
EF2	Numerous trees were damaged in thick forested areas as noted by a scar on satellite imagery.						

== August ==
Confirmed tornadoes by Enhanced Fujita rating
EFU	EF0	EF1	EF2	EF3	EF4	EF5	Total
7	5	6	3	0	0	0	21

=== August 2 event ===
List of confirmed tornadoes – Sunday, August 2, 2026
EF#	Location	Region	Province	Start coord.	Time (UTC)	Path length	Max. width
EF0	Repentigny	L'Assomption	QC	45.7439°N 73.446°W	18:05–?	1 km (0.62 mi)	100 m (110 yd)
EF0	A tornado damaged trees and buildings in Repentigny.						
EF0	N of Kemptville	Leeds and Grenville	ON	45.0438°N 75.6597°W	19:45–?	1.18 km (0.73 mi)	80 m (87 yd)
EF0	Crops and trees were damaged.						

=== August 8 event ===
List of confirmed tornadoes – Saturday, August 8, 2026
EF#	Location	Region	Province	Start coord.	Time (UTC)	Path length	Max. width
EF0	Northern Lindsay	Kawartha Lakes	ON	44.3771°N 78.7718°W	17:05–?	3.38 km (2.10 mi)	40 m (44 yd)
EF0	Trees were damaged and light debris was lofted throughout the northern portions of Lindsay.						
EF0	Western Woodstock	Oxford	ON	43.1212°N 80.8032°W	19:20–?	2.97 km (1.85 mi)	50 m (55 yd)
EF0	This weak tornado damaged trees and fences.						

=== August 12 event ===
List of confirmed tornadoes – Wednesday, August 12, 2026
EF#	Location	Region	Province	Start coord.	Time (UTC)	Path length	Max. width
EFU	W of Carbon	Kneehill	AB	51.48°N 113.25°W	20:00	Unknown	Unknown
EFU	Several photos and videos were taken of a tornado that remained over fields.						
EFU	E of Enilda	Big Lakes	AB	55.417°N 116.2672°W	01:40–?	1.5 km (0.93 mi)	70 m (77 yd)
EFU	This tornado moved over farmland, damaging crops.						

=== August 26 event ===
List of confirmed tornadoes – Wednesday, August 26, 2026
EF#	Location	Region	Province	Start coord.	Time (UTC)	Path length	Max. width
EF1	E of Souris	Kings	PE	46.364°N 62.179°W	15:54–?	1.05 km (0.65 mi)	100 m (110 yd)
EF1	This tornado caused tree damage as it tracked through cropland and forests.						

=== August 27 event ===
List of confirmed tornadoes – Thursday, August 27, 2026
EF#	Location	Region	Province	Start coord.	Time (UTC)	Path length	Max. width
EF2	WSW of La Tuque	La Tuque	QC	47.2753°N 73.3473°W	20:00–?	2.93 km (1.82 mi)	370 m (400 yd)
EF2	This strong tornado did significant tree damage as noted on satellite imagery where it left a scar in a forest.						
EF1	W of La Tuque	La Tuque	QC	47.4892°N 73.1018°W	20:48–?	2.45 km (1.52 mi)	300 m (330 yd)
EF1	A tornado damaged trees in forested areas.						

=== August 29 event ===
List of confirmed tornadoes – Saturday, August 29, 2026
EF#	Location	Region	Province	Start coord.	Time (UTC)	Path length	Max. width
EF2	NE of Kiosk to NW of Daventry	Nipissing	ON	46.1203°N 78.817°W	17:10–?	5.39 km (3.35 mi)	360 m (390 yd)
EF2	A tornado was recorded on video that did damage to trees in northwestern portions of Algonquin Provincial Park.						
EF2	NE of Radiant to NNE of Lake Traverse	Nipissing, Renfrew	ON	46.0774°N 78.1296°W	18:10–?	11.8 km (7.3 mi)	330 m (360 yd)
EF2	This tornado moved through northern portions of Algonquin Provincial Park, damaging trees.						
EF1	N of Deep River, ON	Pontiac	QC	46.2163°N 77.5227°W	21:05–?	11.2 km (7.0 mi)	560 m (610 yd)
EF1	Satellite imagery noted a scar in forested areas north of the Ottawa River.						

=== August 30 event ===
List of confirmed tornadoes – Sunday, August 30, 2026
EF#	Location	Region	Province	Start coord.	Time (UTC)	Path length	Max. width
EFU	W of Wawota	Wawken	SK	49.8617°N 102.0735°W	21:30–?	7.61 km (4.73 mi)	330 m (360 yd)
EFU	This tornado was photographed and recorded as it damaged crops. No other damage was noted.						
EFU	NW of Strathmore	Wheatland	AB	51.11°N 113.49°W	21:43	Unknown	Unknown
EFU	A tornado was recorded as it did no damage.						
EFU	SE of Maryfield	Maryfield	SK	49.768°N 101.4646°W	21:50–?	2.75 km (1.71 mi)	270 m (300 yd)
EFU	This tornado moved through farm fields, damaging only crops.						
EFU	NNW of Wawota	Wawken	SK	49.9906°N 102.0617°W	22:10–?	0.69 km (0.43 mi)	110 m (120 yd)
EFU	A brief tornado damaged crops.						
EFU	N of Kola	Wallace-Woodworth	MB	49.9154°N 101.3882°W	22:42–?	1.53 km (0.95 mi)	120 m (130 yd)
EFU	This tornado moved northwest through cropland. No damage outside of crop damage occurred.						
EF1	NNW of Kola	Wallace-Woodworth	MB	49.8807°N 101.385°W	22:50–?	2.53 km (1.57 mi)	270 m (300 yd)
EF1	This tornado damaged barns, trees, and crops.						
EF1	NNE of Kola to Elkhorn	Wallace-Woodworth	MB	49.9172°N 101.3191°W	23:35–?	11.9 km (7.4 mi)	820 m (900 yd)
EF1	A rain-wrapped tornado moved through Elkhorn and areas south of town, damaging several structures, including barns, farm outbuildings, grain bins and homes, along with trees and crops.						
EF0	N of Elkhorn	Wallace-Woodworth	MB	50.019°N 101.281°W	23:50–?	4.91 km (3.05 mi)	260 m (280 yd)
EF0	Several farm outbuildings and grain bins were damaged. Trees were damaged as well.						
EF1	WNW of Ethelbert	Duck Mountain	MB	51.6064°N 100.9142°W	01:15–?	2.93 km (1.82 mi)	250 m (270 yd)
EF1	This tornado occurred within Duck Mountain Provincial Park, damaging the roof of a shop and lofting heavy items near a campground. A narrow path of tree damage was also noted on satellite imagery.						

== September ==
Confirmed tornadoes by Enhanced Fujita rating
EFU	EF0	EF1	EF2	EF3	EF4	EF5	Total
1	2	7	1	0	0	0	11

=== September 2 event ===
List of confirmed tornadoes – Wednesday, September 2, 2026
EF#	Location	Region	Province	Start coord.	Time (UTC)	Path length	Max. width
EF1	WNW of Monkton	Perth	ON	43.6092°N 81.2014°W	21:06–?	4.91 km (3.05 mi)	50 m (55 yd)
EF1	This tornado damaged two farm buildings, grain bins, trees, and crops.						
EF0	Tavistock	Oxford	ON	43.3277°N 80.8992°W	21:23–?	6.24 km (3.88 mi)	410 m (450 yd)
EF0	Minor damage occurred to the roofs of buildings in Tavistock. Trees and crops were also damaged.						
EF1	NNE of Tavistock	Oxford	ON	43.3481°N 80.8193°W	21:25–?	8.29 km (5.15 mi)	420 m (460 yd)
EF1	This tornado tracked through rural farmland and damaged several farm buildings, including one barn being completely destroyed. Damage also occurred to trees and crops.						
EF1	N of Wellesley	Waterloo	ON	43.491°N 80.8012°W	21:25–?	6.11 km (3.80 mi)	490 m (540 yd)
EF1	A tornado damaged power poles, trees and a fabric-covered structure north of Wellesley. Damage also occurred to the roof of a barn and a home and crops. A converted refrigerated trailer was moved from its original location.						

=== September 3 event ===
List of confirmed tornadoes – Thursday, September 3, 2026
EF#	Location	Region	Province	Start coord.	Time (UTC)	Path length	Max. width
EF2	Detroit, MI to Windsor, ON	Wayne (MI), Essex (ON)	MI, ON	42.3685°N 83.0291°W	20:14–?	12.63 km (7.85 mi)	1,100 m (1,200 yd)
EF2	This large and strong tornado touched down and first snapped branches off trees and damaged the siding of several residences before striking the Preferred Meal Systems building, ripping away parts of the roof and knocking over a nearby outbuilding. The surrounding fence was damaged, and a large tree was uprooted. The tornado continued to the southeast, uprooting and damaging several trees and inflicting damage to traffic lights before intensifying and expanding in width. The tornado impacted a couple of industrial buildings, partially removing the roofs and collapsing walls. The tornado tracked into more residential areas, snapping and uprooting large trees, damaging electrical and lighting poles, and inflicting damage to the roofs and siding of homes. The tornado then struck two vacant buildings, collapsing them with minimal structure remaining upright. The tornado continued to inflict damage to trees before damaging a restaurant, with the sign being torn off and the roof and veneer being damaged. The tornado crossed the Detroit River onto Belle Isle, throwing a scull boat into a tree and uprooting and snapping numerous other trees. The tornado continued to inflict damage to trees across central portions of Belle Isle before crossing into Canada on the other side of the Detroit River. In Windsor, several structures were damaged, including significant roof loss to a home, tree damage and a toppled trailer.						
EF0	River Canard to E of Amherstburg	Essex	ON	42.1808°N 83.0906°W	20:19–?	5.1 km (3.2 mi)	200 m (220 yd)
EF0	Several homes suffered minor roof damage, a power pole was bent and trees and foliage were damaged.						
EF1	N of Wheatley	Chatham-Kent	ON	42.1168°N 82.4868°W	20:48–?	6.3 km (3.9 mi)	450 m (490 yd)
EF1	A tornado damaged a large barn, the roof of a home, and trees. Two transport trucks were also rolled over.						

=== September 6 event ===
List of confirmed tornadoes – Sunday, September 6, 2026
EF#	Location	Region	Province	Start coord.	Time (UTC)	Path length	Max. width
EF1	W of Elie	Cartier	MB	49.9212°N 97.8664°W	22:50–?	6.45 km (4.01 mi)	460 m (500 yd)
EF1	Several buildings and grain bins were damaged at a large farm. One person was injured.						
EF1	Winnipeg	Winnipeg	MB	49.8517°N 97.1951°W	23:31–?	2 km (1.2 mi)	150 m (160 yd)
EF1	This tornado moved through the River Heights neighborhood in Winnipeg, damaging the roofs of homes, sheds, and trees. A car was dragged across a lawn as well.						

=== September 7 event ===
List of confirmed tornadoes – Monday, September 7, 2026
EF#	Location	Region	Province	Start coord.	Time (UTC)	Path length	Max. width
EFU	S of Weyburn	Weyburn	SK	49.63°N 103.85°W	21:20	Unknown	Unknown
EFU	A tornado was observed south of the city, doing no damage.						

=== September 8 event ===
List of confirmed tornadoes – Tuesday, September 8, 2026
EF#	Location	Region	Province	Start coord.	Time (UTC)	Path length	Max. width
EF1	NE of Cat Lake	Kenora	ON	51.8719°N 91.3037°W	21:05–?	7.56 km (4.70 mi)	150 m (160 yd)
EF1	This tornado left a scar through rural forests, damaging numerous trees.						

== See also ==
- Tornadoes of 2026
- List of Canadian tornadoes and tornado outbreaks (2000–present)
