= Tullibee (disambiguation) =

Tullibee, Tulliby or Tulaby may refer to:

- Coregonus artedi, a fish commonly known as the Tullibee
- USS Tullibee (SS-284), a submarine commissioned in 1943 and sunk in 1944
- USS Tullibee (SSN-597), a submarine in commission from 1960 to 1988
- Tulaby Lake, a lake in Minnesota, United States
- Tulliby Lake, a lake in Alberta, Canada
