= Alberta Highway 897 =

Highway in Alberta, Canada

Highway 897

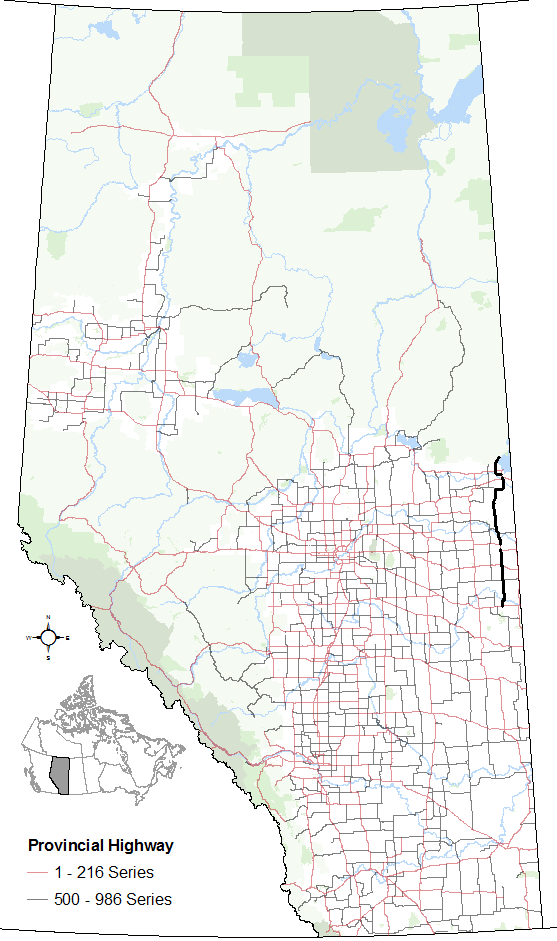

Route information
- Maintained by Alberta Transportation
- Length: 209 km (130 mi)

South segment
- Length: 186 km (116 mi)
- South end: Highway 14 north of Edgerton
- Major intersections: Highway 16 (TCH) at Kitscoty; Highway 45 at Marwayne
- North end: Highway 55 south of Cold Lake

North segment
- Length: 23 km (14 mi)
- South end: Cold Lake city limits
- Major intersections: Highway 55 west of Cold Lake
- North end: Township Road 652 west of Cold Lake Provincial Park

Location
- Country: Canada
- Province: Alberta
- Specialized and rural municipalities: Wainwright M.D. No. 61, Vermilion River County, St. Paul County No. 19, Bonnyville M.D. No. 87
- Major cities: Cold Lake
- Villages: Paradise Valley, Kitscoty, Marwayne

Highway system
- Alberta Numbered Highway Network; List; Former
← Highway 895	→ Highway 899

Alberta Provincial Highway No. 897 is a highway in the province of Alberta, Canada. It runs south-north in two sections, from Highway 14 north of Edgerton to Highway 55 south of Cold Lake, then from Kingsway at the west CFB Cold Lake limits to where Township Road 651 would be, west of Cold Lake Provincial Park. The south section runs between Highway 17 and Highway 41, the north section offers a route to resorts and vacation spots north of Cold Lake.

== Major intersections ==
Starting from the south end of Highway 897:

Rural/specialized municipality	Location	km	mi	Destinations	Notes
M.D. of Wainwright No. 61		0.0	0.0	Highway 14 – Wainwright, Edmonton, The Battlefords	
↑ / ↓		8.8	5.5	Crosses the Battle River	
County of Vermilion River	Paradise Valley	21.8	13.5	Township Road 471	
County of Vermilion River		36.4	22.6	Highway 619 – Viking	
County of Vermilion River	Kitscoty	55.5	34.5	Highway 16 (TCH/YH) – Edmonton, Lloydminster	
County of Vermilion River	Marwayne	76.2	47.3	Highway 45 east – Prince Albert	South end of Highway 45 concurrency
County of Vermilion River		83.6	51.9	Highway 45 west – Two Hills	North end of Highway 45 concurrency
County of Vermilion River		92.3	57.4	Crosses the North Saskatchewan River	
County of Vermilion River		98.5	61.2	Highway 641 east – Tulliby Lake, Onion Lake	
County of St. Paul No. 19		105.0	65.2	Highway 646 west – Heinsburg	
Unipouheos 121	Frog Lake	112.9	70.2	Township Road 562	
Puskiakiwenin 122	No major junctions				
M.D. of Bonnyville No. 87		160.1	99.5	Highway 659 west – Bonnyville	
M.D. of Bonnyville No. 87		171.4	106.5	Township Road 610 – Elizabeth Metis Settlement	
M.D. of Bonnyville No. 87		183.8	114.2	Crosses the Beaver River	
M.D. of Bonnyville No. 87		186.2	115.7	Highway 55 to Highway 28 – Cold Lake, Pierceland	
6.0 km (3.7 mi) gap
City of Cold Lake		192.2	119.4	Highway 28 / Highway 55 (55 Street) / 50 Avenue	
City of Cold Lake		194.5– 200.5	120.9– 124.6	Passes through CFB Cold Lake	
M.D. of Bonnyville No. 87		200.5	124.6	Cold Lake city limits	
M.D. of Bonnyville No. 87		204.4	127.0	Highway 55 – Lac La Biche, Cold Lake	
M.D. of Bonnyville No. 87		224.3	139.4	Range Road 23 / Township Road 652A	Continues north on Township Road 652A
1.000 mi = 1.609 km; 1.000 km = 0.621 mi: Closed/former; Concurrency terminus
