= Rivercourse =

Rivercourse or river course may refer to:

- Rivercourse, Alberta, Canada
- The course of a river
- The River Course, at Blackwolf Run golf complex in Kohler, Wisconsin, USA

== See also ==
- Watercourse
