= Paradise Valley, Alberta =

Paradise Valley
- Village
- Village of Paradise Valley
- Location of Paradise Valley Paradise Valley (Canada)
- Coordinates: 53°1′52″N 110°17′41″W
- Country: Canada
- Province: Alberta
- Region: Central Alberta
- Census division: 10
- Municipal district: County of Vermilion River
- Incorporated
  - Village: January 1, 1964

Government
  - Mayor: Mary Arnold
  - Governing body: Paradise Valley Village Council

Area (2021)
  - Land: 0.63 km^{2} (0.24 sq mi)
- Elevation: 630 m (2,070 ft)

Population (2021)
  - Total: 153
  - Density: 243.6/km^{2} (631/sq mi)
- Time zone: UTC−06:00 (Alberta Time)
- Postal code span: T0B 3R0
- Area code: 780
- Highways: Highway 897; Highway 614
- Website: villageofparadisevalley.ca

Paradise Valley is a village in central Alberta, Canada. It is located east of Highway 897, approximately 37 km (23 mi) south of Kitscoty.

The economic base of the village is largely agricultural. Nearby hog operations and the Co-Op seed cleaning plant also contribute to local production.

== History ==
Paradise Valley has a long and rich agricultural history. The town was once host to six grain elevators along the rail line. Now, only one still stands, having been converted to the Climb Thru Time Museum. The project was spearheaded by Parke Dobson and Don Purser, as well as numerous others in the community.

The first school in the town was opened in 1930.

== Climate ==
Climate data for Paradise Valley 1981 to 2010 Canadian Climate Normals station data
Month	Jan	Feb	Mar	Apr	May	Jun	Jul	Aug	Sep	Oct	Nov	Dec	Year
Record high °C (°F)	9.0 (48.2)	10.0 (50.0)	17.5 (63.5)	28.5 (83.3)	33.0 (91.4)	39.0 (102.2)	40.0 (104.0)	38.5 (101.3)	33.5 (92.3)	28.0 (82.4)	14.5 (58.1)	10.0 (50.0)	40.0 (104.0)
Mean daily maximum °C (°F)	−9.3 (15.3)	−6.3 (20.7)	−0.2 (31.6)	10.7 (51.3)	17.6 (63.7)	21.5 (70.7)	23.8 (74.8)	23.6 (74.5)	17.4 (63.3)	9.5 (49.1)	−2.5 (27.5)	−8.5 (16.7)	8.1 (46.6)
Daily mean °C (°F)	−14.2 (6.4)	−11.4 (11.5)	−5.3 (22.5)	4.3 (39.7)	10.4 (50.7)	14.7 (58.5)	16.8 (62.2)	16.2 (61.2)	10.5 (50.9)	3.5 (38.3)	−6.9 (19.6)	−13.2 (8.2)	2.1 (35.8)
Mean daily minimum °C (°F)	−19.1 (−2.4)	−16.6 (2.1)	−10.4 (13.3)	−2.2 (28.0)	3.3 (37.9)	7.8 (46.0)	9.8 (49.6)	8.8 (47.8)	3.6 (38.5)	−2.6 (27.3)	−11.2 (11.8)	−17.8 (0.0)	−3.9 (25.0)
Record low °C (°F)	−41.5 (−42.7)	−44 (−47)	−36.5 (−33.7)	−22 (−8)	−12 (10)	−2.5 (27.5)	1.0 (33.8)	−4 (25)	−10 (14)	−23.5 (−10.3)	−34 (−29)	−42.5 (−44.5)	−44 (−47)
Average precipitation mm (inches)	18.4 (0.72)	11.0 (0.43)	16.7 (0.66)	28.6 (1.13)	36.5 (1.44)	61.1 (2.41)	70.3 (2.77)	48.7 (1.92)	31.2 (1.23)	15.9 (0.63)	19.1 (0.75)	18.4 (0.72)	375.8 (14.80)
Average rainfall mm (inches)	1 (0.0)	0.3 (0.01)	1.4 (0.06)	13.2 (0.52)	32.5 (1.28)	61.1 (2.41)	70.3 (2.77)	48.5 (1.91)	29.4 (1.16)	8.6 (0.34)	1.5 (0.06)	0.5 (0.02)	268.3 (10.56)
Average snowfall cm (inches)	18.4 (7.2)	11 (4.3)	16.7 (6.6)	28.6 (11.3)	36.5 (14.4)	61.1 (24.1)	70.3 (27.7)	48.7 (19.2)	31.2 (12.3)	15.9 (6.3)	19.1 (7.5)	18.4 (7.2)	375.8 (148.0)
Average precipitation days (≥ 0.2 mm)	10	7	8	8	10	13	13	11	9	7	9	10	115
Average rainy days (≥ 0.2 mm)	1	0	1	5	10	13	13	11	8	5	1	1	71
Average snowy days (≥ 0.2 cm)	9	7	7	4	1	0	0	0	1	3	8	10	50
Source: Environment and Climate Change Canada

== Demographics ==
In the 2021 Census of Population conducted by Statistics Canada, the Village of Paradise Valley had a population of 153 living in 57 of its 75 total private dwellings, a change of −14.5% from its 2016 population of 179. With a land area of 0.63 km^{2} (0.24 sq mi), it had a population density of 242.9/km^{2} (629.0/sq mi) in 2021.

In the 2016 Census of Population conducted by Statistics Canada, the Village of Paradise Valley recorded a population of 179 living in 73 of its 76 total private dwellings, a 2.9% change from its 2011 population of 174. With a land area of 0.63 km^{2} (0.24 sq mi), it had a population density of 284.1/km^{2} (735.9/sq mi) in 2016.

== Facilities ==
There are several churches and a K-12 school, the E.H. Walter School, part of the Buffalo Trail Public Schools Regional Division No. 28 in Paradise Valley. There is a public arena and curling rink on the north side of town that also houses a cafe.

The village office, post office, firehall and village shop are all located downtown. The Agricultural Society Hall and Alberta Treasury Branch can also be found downtown.

Paradise Valley is home to a café and Climb Thru Time Museum run by the Paradise Valley Historical Society.

== Events ==
Paradise Valley is the home of the Three Cities Arena, the site of the Three Cities Park and the site of the annual Three Cities Fair. Three Cities refers to Paradise Valley and the nearby hamlets of McLaughlin and Rivercourse.

== See also ==
- List of communities in Alberta
- List of villages in Alberta
