= Vermilion River (Alberta) =

River in Alberta, Canada

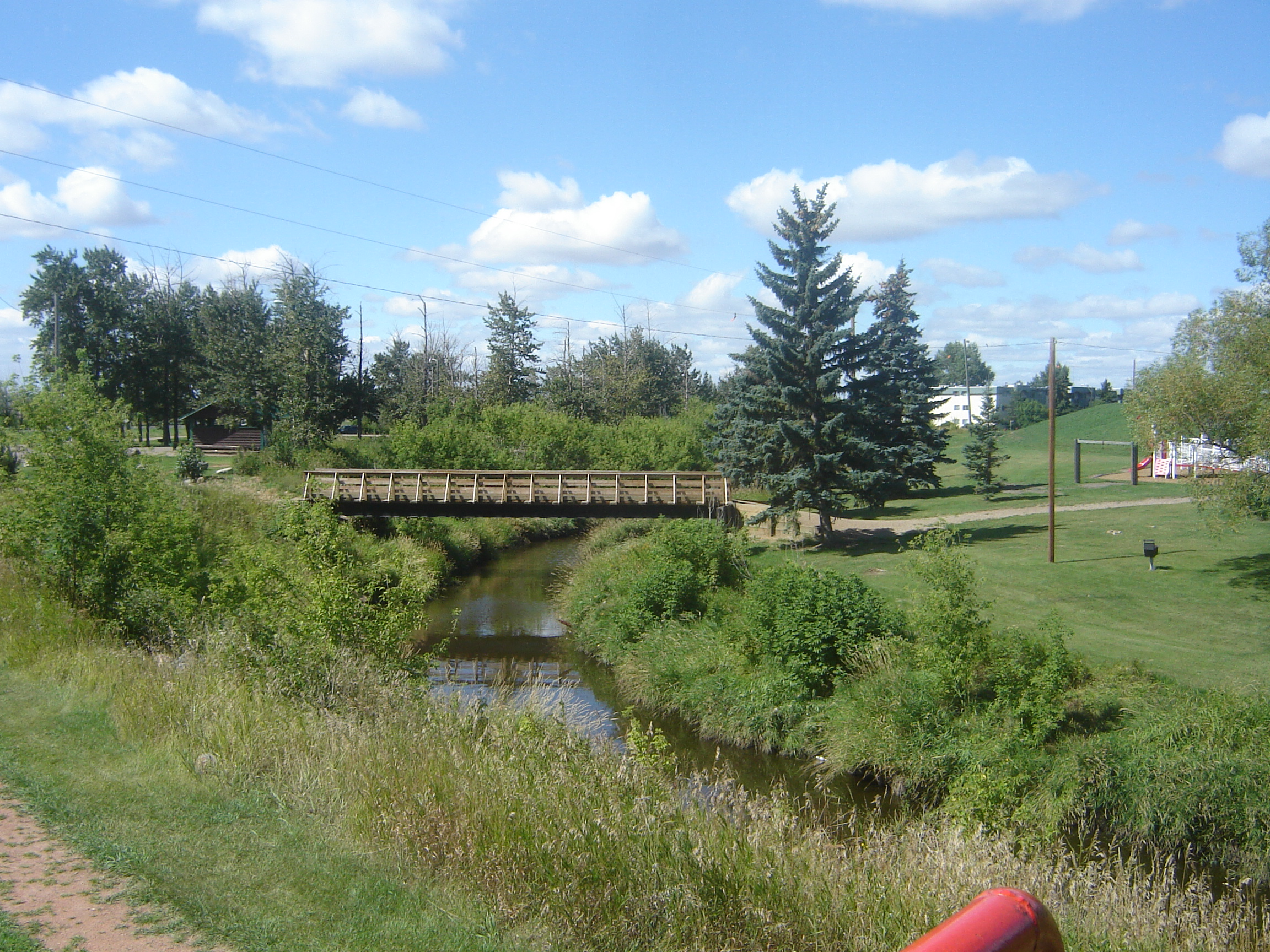
- The Vermilion River in Vegreville

Location
- Country: Canada
- Province: Alberta

Physical characteristics
- Source
  - location: Central Alberta
  - coordinates: 53°08′17″N 111°55′23″W
  - elevation: 690 m (2,260 ft)
- Mouth
  - location: North Saskatchewan River
  - coordinates: 53°39′34″N 110°20′08″W
  - elevation: 510 m (1,670 ft)
- Length: 255 km (158 mi)
- Discharge
  - average: 1.17 m^{3}/s (41 cu ft/s)

The Vermilion River is a tributary of the North Saskatchewan River in east-central Alberta, Canada. Its lower course flows through the County of Vermilion River, which is named after this river. It has been said that this river got its name from the distinctive red clay on the edge of the river banks.

== Course ==
The Vermilion River is formed from spring runoff and rainfall south of the town of Vegreville. It flows northeast through Vegreville, then continues in that direction until the town of Two Hills, where it turns southeast. At Vermilion, a reservoir is created by a dam on the river. After that, the river turns again to the northeast. It empties into the North Saskatchewan River 16 km north of Marwayne.

Vermilion River has a length of 255 km. Before its confluence with the North Saskatchewan River, it has an average water level of 16.5 m.

The Vermilion Provincial Park is established on the banks of the river.

== Fishing ==
The Vermilion River is home to northern pike, fathead minnow, lake chub, brook stickleback (Culaea inconstans), longnose dace and white sucker. This waterway is subject to North Saskatchewan Tributaries fishing regulations

== See also ==
- List of rivers of Alberta
