= Lillian Sarafinchan =

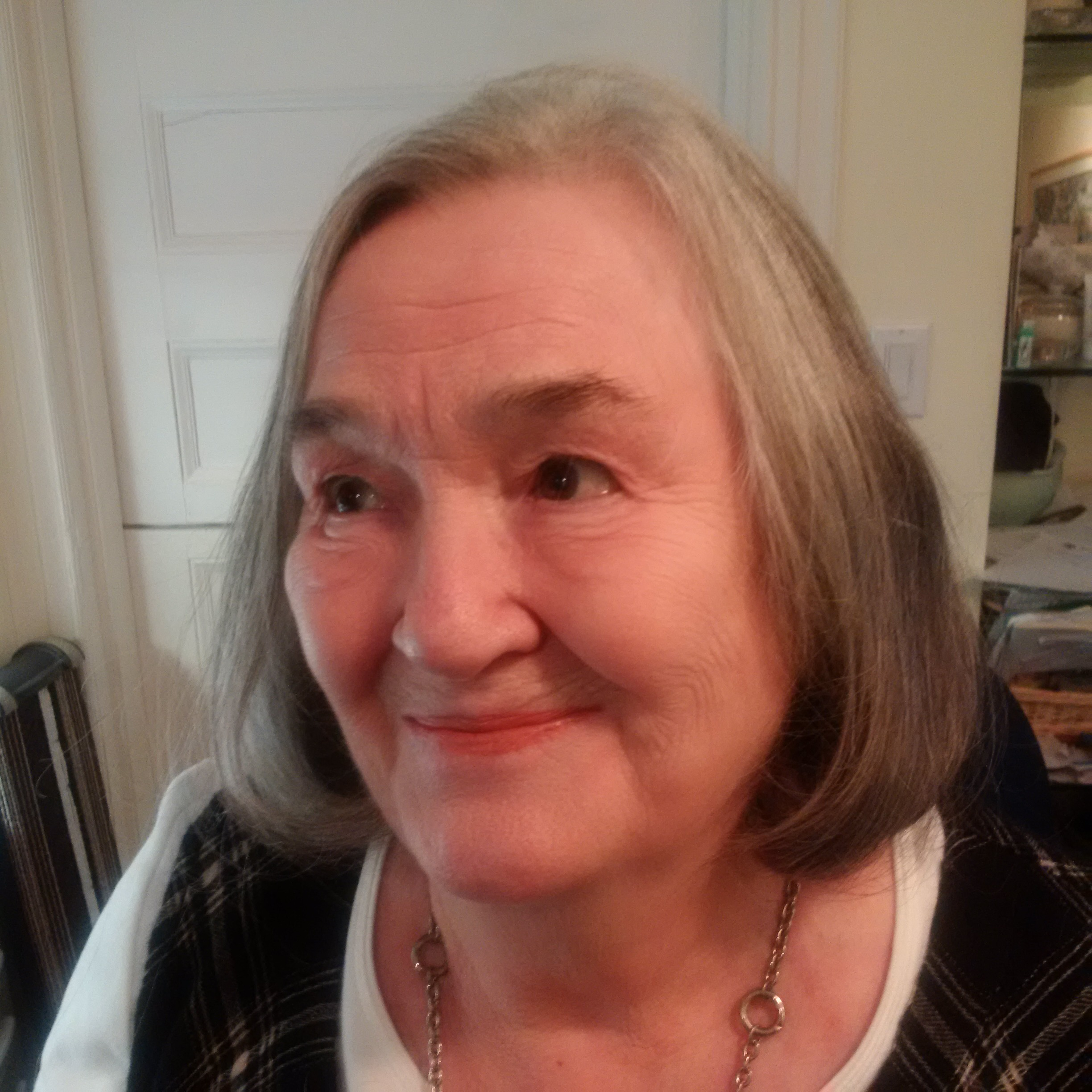
- Born: 1935 (age 90–91); Vegreville, Alberta

Lillian Sarafinchan (born 1935) is a painter and teacher, production design, continuity & art director and locations director.

== Early life and education ==
Sarafinchan was born in Vegreville, Alberta, in 1935, the eldest of three brothers and eventually, a sister.

Sarafinchan's interest in art began early. Confined at home with measles at age 12, she began passing the time on the family farm painting with whatever materials she could find at hand. She took some of her paintings with her when she returned to school. Her teacher, Mrs. Miller, hung them in the classroom, which also happened to be used once a week by an adult art class sponsored by the University of Alberta in Edmonton Extension Program, led by a local artist, Laura Evans Reid, who noticed Sarafinchan's work and encouraged her to join her art class. When Sarafinchan was 15, Laura Reid secretly entered some of Sarafinchan's work in a province-wide competition. As a result, Sarafinchan won first prize and the first of her 8 scholarships to summer classes at the Banff School of Fine Arts. After completing High School, Sarafinchan moved on the Ontario College of Art (OCA) in Toronto. Because of a health problem, she did not complete her first year. but, in spite of this, was awarded a scholarship to continue into her second year. Laura. Reid had also given Sarafinchan introductions to members of the Group of Seven in Toronto. Jock McDonald, one her instructors at OCA, became one of her mentors. She graduated from OCA with the Medal for Proficiency in Drawing and Painting.

== Career ==
After graduation, Sarafinchan was asked by Harley Parker, another painting instructor at OCA, to join him and Marshall McLuhan in their redesign and new approach to exhibitions at the Royal Ontario Museum (ROM) in Toronto. Sarafinchan's main responsibility was to work with the trades in executing the ideas generated by the three of them in fulfilling their mandate to bring a more exciting, new, contemporary draw to the museum. Some of their exhibitions included a fashion show, masks and posters from around the world. And she continued to paint. In 1966, she was asked if she would like to hang a few of her works in the Alpha Gamma Delta sorority house (where she had become a member and had lived while at Art College). A three-day show was mounted, drawing a crowd of people and leading to the offer of a one-woman show at Toronto's Pennell Gallery and an invitation to hang one of her paintings in Habitat at Expo ‘67 in Montreal (in the end, three were chosen).

== Exhibitions ==
Solo exhibitions followed including at Adam and Yves Gallery, two at the Dunkleman Gallery, (Stong College, York University), of which she became a teaching fellow, one in Edmonton, near her home town of Vegreville (1974, and a special thrill for her) and two solo exhibitions at Toronto’s prestigious Roberts Gallery. Sarafinchan also loved to teach and, under the auspices of the Art Gallery of Ontario and the Ontario Arts Council, was sought after to give workshops by schools, art associations and galleries in Ontario as well as in Quebec and Alberta. Sarafinchan married and subsequently raised two sons on her own. She continued painting until she developed an allergic reaction to the media and had to put it all aside. She had by then entered the film business... first in continuity and eventually as a production designer (picking up a Genie along the way, for "Dancing in the Dark"). Eventually she became a sought after location manager and scout. Her works are owned and appreciated in Canada, the US, England, Australia and Ukraine, in both private and corporate collections.

== Awards ==
In 1987 Sarafinchan won a Genie Award for 'Dancing in the Dark' production design and art direction.
