= Linda Craddock =

Canadian visual artist (born 1952)

- Born: 1952 age 73; Vegreville, Alberta
- Education: Alberta College of Art (Diploma); University of Calgary (BFA); University of Calgary (MFA)
- Known for: visual artist
- Partner: Peter Deacon
- Website: https://lindacraddock.ca/cv/

Linda Craddock (aka Green, Edgar born 1952) is a Canadian visual artist living in Calgary, Alberta. Her work has been featured in exhibitions since 1973.

== Early life and education ==
Craddock was born and raised in Vegreville, Alberta. She attended Alberta College of Art + Design (1970–1974) and completed her BFA (1979–1981) and MFA (1986–1988) at the University of Calgary. In 1987, the National Gallery of Canada purchased a series of six of Craddock's photographs to add to the Canadian Photography Institute's collection.

== Career ==
In 1988, Craddock moved to Vancouver Island where she resided with her family and worked at a post secondary photography school in Victoria. In 1997, she moved to one of the Gulf Islands and employed the location's remoteness to reflect upon her art. Craddock (then working under the name Linda Brock) found that the island's remoteness promoted contemplation of her prior life, living in the Prairies, enabling her to "go back to other times and places with ease and grace." Her exhibition Awaiting Memories (2003) was vastly inspired by these reflections on her personal life. After six years of living on Pender Island, Craddock returned to Calgary, becoming involved with the Calgary Board of Education and teaching photography at the University of Calgary.

In the series of paintings for the exhibition Hometown Dreams: Memory and Change, Craddock examined the elusiveness of experience, memory and time. In Hometown Dreams she explored her relationship with the community of rural Alberta. Craddock states, " None of us live [sic]exclusively in the present. What we understand as being 'now' is in fact an amalgamation of personal and collective experiences interactive with a current framework of existence. This defines who we are..."

A source of inspiration for the exhibition Levitas, was Banff National Park, where Craddock created a series of paintings centered on the sensation of levitation that she describes as a experience that exists in our dream state, "A desire to be 'free' or to transcend the bounds of gravity also results in our spiritual aspirations and changes the shape of our memories."

Craddock's work has been exhibited nationally in Ontario, Quebec, British Columbia, Alberta, and Saskatchewan as well as being a part of a touring exhibition with the Canadian Museum of Contemporary Photography, titled Portraits of Women in 1990. Her work is included in the collections of the Canadian Museum of Contemporary Photography, Ottawa, Ontario; the Art Gallery of Alberta, Edmonton, Alberta; and the Alberta Foundation for the Arts, Alberta.

== Bibliography ==
- Linda Craddock’s Levitations by Portia Priegert, Galleries West Magazine. February (2018)
- Bridges: 85th Anniversary of the Alberta Society of Artists (2016)
- Hometown Dreams Featured Artist, Mud Season Review, Issue #2 October 20 (online periodical) (2014)
- From Calgary to Krakow Fast Forward Weekly Volume 14, No. 29 Calgary, Alberta (2009)
- Images and Reflections, The Artists Circle of Calgary, Triangle Gallery of Visual Arts Catalogue (2008)
- Photo Cover, The Malahat Review, edited by John Barton, University of Victoria. Issue 167/ June (2009)
- Road to Success Alternative Trends Volume 2 Issue 3, Spring (2007)
- Artist Portraits Galleries West. Vol. 2 No. 2 Summer (2003)
- The Pacific Northwest Landscape, by Kitty Harmon, Sasquatch Books, Seattle, USA. (Book) (2001)
- Mrs.Pidruchney ACUA Vitae: Ukrainian Council for Alberta Arts, Vol 2, No. 4. December (as author) (1992)
- Portraits of Women, The Canadian Museum of Contemporary Photography, Ottawa, Ontario (1990)
- Alternate Visions, by Christopher Jackson, Curator, Glenbow Museum, Calgary, Alberta (1989)
- Women Photographers on Women’s Issues by Brenda Pelkey. BlackFlash Spring Vol.6 No.1 (1988)
- Four From Calgary Update, Edmonton Art Gallery, Vol 6 No. 6. November/December (1981)
- Ukrainian Canadiana Ukrainian Women's Association of Canada pp 76. (Book) (1981)
