= Dewberry, Alberta =

Dewberry
- Hamlet
- Hamlet of Dewberry
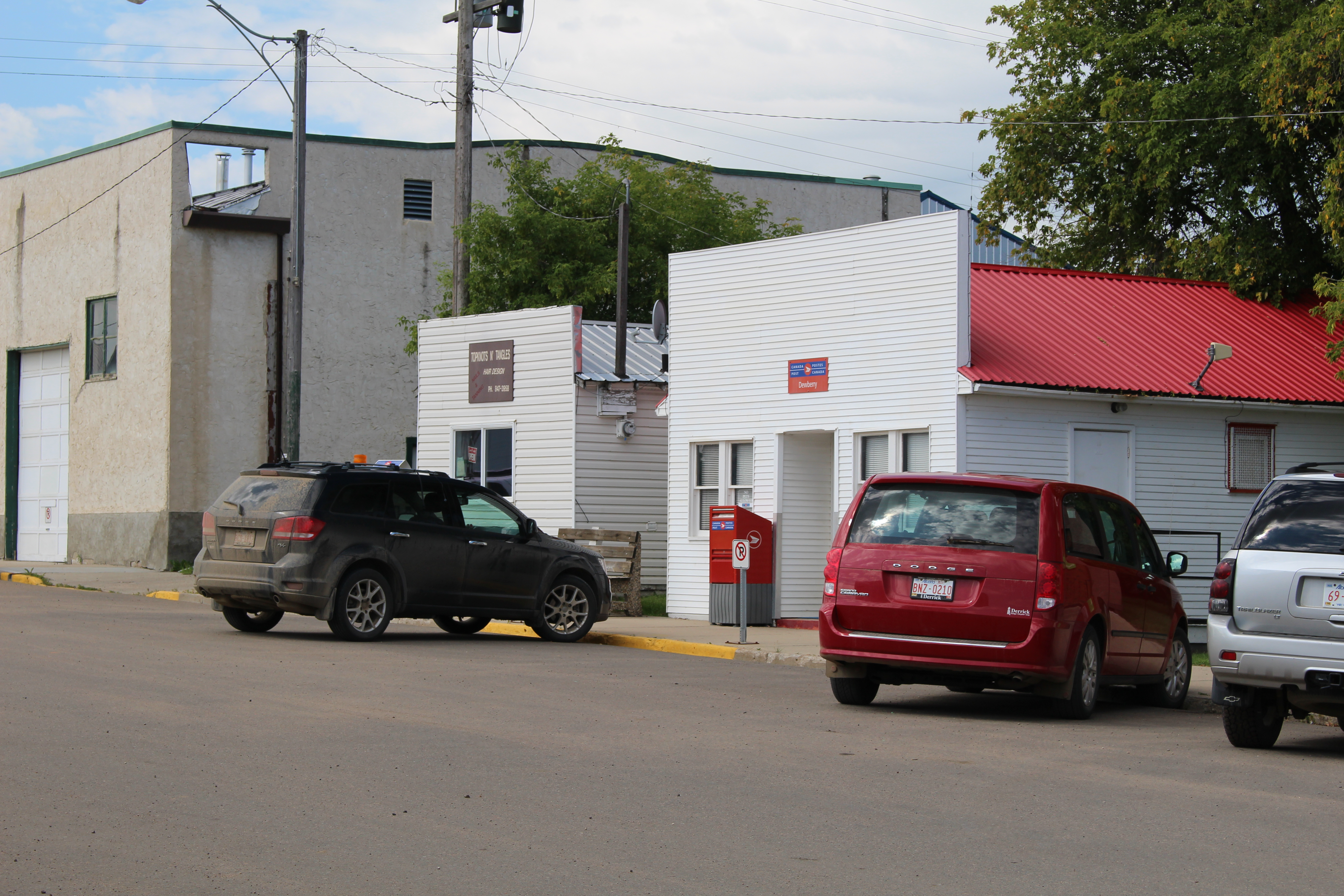
- The post office in Dewberry

- Location in Alberta
- Coordinates: 53°35′09.4″N 110°31′16.2″W
- Country: Canada
- Province: Alberta
- Region: Central Alberta
- Census division: 10
- Municipal district: County of Vermilion River
- Incorporated
  - Village: January 1, 1957
- Dissolved: January 1, 2021

Area (2016)
  - Land: 0.82 km^{2} (0.32 sq mi)
- Elevation: 600 m (2,000 ft)

Population (2016)
  - Total: 186
  - Density: 226.3/km^{2} (586/sq mi)
- Time zone: UTC−06:00 (Alberta Time)
- Highways: Highway 893 Highway 45
- Website: Official website

Dewberry is a hamlet in central Alberta, Canada within the County of Vermilion River. It is approximately 66 km (41 mi) northwest of Lloydminster. The hamlet was named for the dewberries growing near the community. Its first school opened in 1930. Dewberry held village status prior to 2021.

== History ==
Dewberry incorporated as a village on January 1, 1957. It relinquished its village status on January 1, 2021, when it dissolved to become a hamlet under the jurisdiction of the County of Vermilion River.

== Demographics ==
In the 2016 Census of Population conducted by Statistics Canada, Dewberry recorded a population of 186 living in 90 of its 104 total private dwellings, a −7.5% change from its 2011 population of 201. With a land area of 0.82 km^{2} (0.32 sq mi), it had a population density of 226.8/km^{2} (587.5/sq mi) in 2016.

In the 2011 Census, Dewberry had a population of 201 living in 87 of its 106 total dwellings, a 2.6% change from its 2006 population of 196. With a land area of 0.84 km^{2} (0.32 sq mi), it had a population density of 239.3/km^{2} (619.7/sq mi) in 2011.

The population of Dewberry, according to its 2010 municipal census is 219, a 5.2% decrease from its 2008 municipal census population of 231.

== See also ==
- List of communities in Alberta
- List of hamlets in Alberta
