= Vermilion Provincial Park =

Provincial park in Alberta, Canada

- IUCN category II (national park)
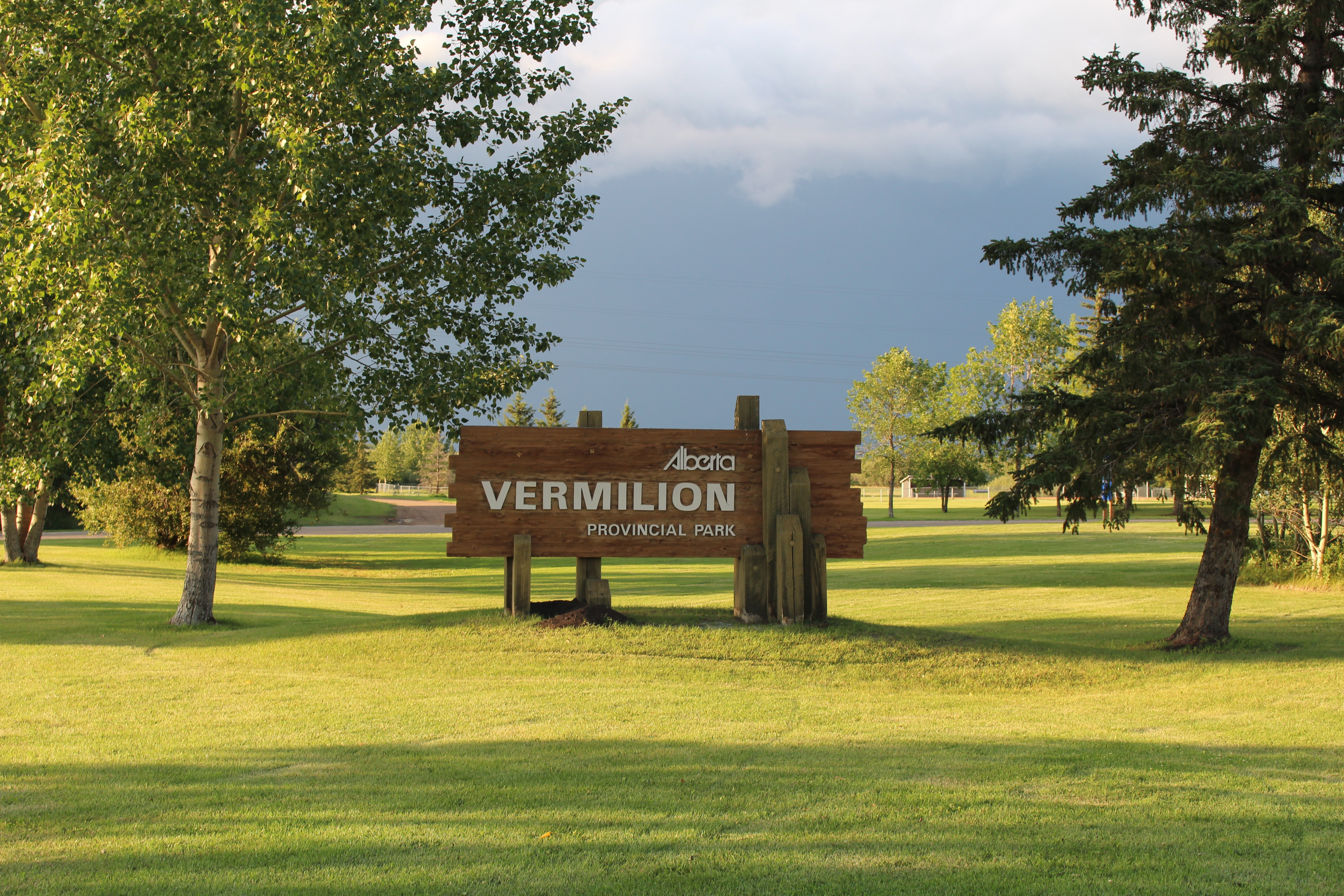

- Location within Alberta
- Interactive map of Vermilion Provincial Park
- Location: County of Vermilion River, Alberta, Canada
- Nearest city: Vermilion
- Coordinates: 53°22′07″N 110°54′34″W
- Area: 7.50 km^{2} (2.90 sq mi)
- Established: May 29, 1953
- Governing body: Alberta Tourism, Parks and Recreation, MV Camp Operations

Vermilion Provincial Park is a provincial park located in east-central Alberta, Canada, in the County of Vermilion River. It is located on the outskirts of the town of Vermilion, which is at the junction of Highways 16 (Yellowhead) and 41 (Buffalo Trail), between Edmonton and Lloydminster.

== History ==
The park was first constructed in the early 1950s, and opened to the public on May 29, 1953. Vermilion Provincial Park was the 7th park integrated into the Alberta Parks system. One of the key features of the park is that the Vermilion River was dammed to create an artificial lake (the 6.3 km long Vermilion Park Lake).

== Nature ==
The environmental setting includes aspen parkland and prairie grassland biomes, with wildlife such as white-tailed deer, red fox, Franklin's ground squirrels, porcupines, ruffed grouse, harriers, red-tailed hawks, short-eared owls, Canada geese, great blue herons, American bitterns, common ducks, mink, muskrats, beavers, coyotes, Sprague's pipits and savannah and vesper sparrows.

The Vermilion River fish population consists of northern pike, fathead minnow, lake chub, brook stickleback (Culaea inconstans), longnose dace and white sucker.

== Activities ==
The park is open year-round, but is only staffed during the summer (from May 15 to September 23).

There are a number of trails for cross-country skiing in winter and horseback riding during summer. The park also has 14.9 km of maintained hiking and biking trails as well as 5 km of paved paths that can be used for rollerblading. Named trails in the park include Wild Rose Trail, Cathedral Loop, Fescue Trail, and Lakeside Trail.

Fishing is also allowed in the Vermilion River Reservoir, with a designated pond for trout fishing which is stocked every year by the Alberta Conservation Association. Water based activities include canoeing, kayaking and sailing.

A year-round campground with all amenities is located in the park, as well as three group camping sites. A back country camping area is also available for rental. Several additional day use areas (including the CN station and one featuring a baseball diamond) are found in the park. A golf course is found in Vermilion, and a mini golf course is within the park limits.

The old CNR station has been relocated to the park, as well an old CNR caboose which is on display near the station.

== Trivia ==
Beckie Scott, a cross country skier who won medals at both the 2002 and 2006 Winter Olympic Games, skied on these trails in her early years.

== See also ==
- List of provincial parks in Alberta
- List of Canadian provincial parks
- List of National Parks of Canada
