= Laura Evans Reid =

Canadian artist (1883-1951)

- Born: 1883; Guelph, Ontario, Canada
- Died: 1951 (aged 67–68); Vegreville, Alberta
- Known for: Painting

Laura Evans Reid (1883–1951) was a Canadian painter

== Biography ==
Reid was born on February 15, 1883, in Guelph, Ontario, Canada.

In 1908 she married Robert Reid in Perth, Ontario. The couple eventually settled in Vegreville, Alberta. Reid began painting at the age of 52. She studied with Henry George Glyde at the Community Art program for the University of Alberta's Department of Extension. Reid also studied at the Banff School of Fine Arts. She was a member of the Calgary Sketch Club and the Alberta Society of Artists.

Lowrie died in 1951 in Vegreville. Her work is in the University of Alberta Museums.
