= Brent MacNab =

Canadian ice hockey player (1931–2020)

Brent Macnab
- Born: January 15, 1931; Vermilion, Alberta, Canada
- Died: July 1, 2020 (aged 89); Lloydminster, Alberta, Canada
- Height: 5 ft 8 in (173 cm)
- Weight: 180 lb (82 kg; 12 st 12 lb)
- Position: Defense
- Shot: Left
- Played for: St. Louis Flyers; Syracuse Warriors; Springfield Indians; Vancouver Canucks; Chicoutimi Sagueneens; Quebec Aces
- Playing career: 1949–1961

Brent Macnab (January 15, 1931 – July 1, 2020) was a Canadian professional hockey player who played for the St. Louis Flyers, Syracuse Warriors and Springfield Indians in the American Hockey League. He also played for the Vancouver Canucks in the Western Hockey League, and the Springfield Indians, Chicoutimi Sagueneens, and Quebec Aces in the Quebec Hockey League.
