= Clandonald =

- Hamlet
- Location of Clandonald Clandonald (Canada)
- Coordinates: 53°34′19″N 110°42′50″W
- Country: Canada
- Province: Alberta
- Region: Central Alberta
- Census division: 10
- Municipal district: County of Vermilion River

Government
  - Type: Unincorporated
  - Governing body: County of Vermilion River Council

Area (2021)
  - Land: 0.47 km^{2} (0.18 sq mi)

Population (2021)
  - Total: 117
  - Density: 248.1/km^{2} (643/sq mi)
- Time zone: UTC−06:00 (Alberta Time)
- Area codes: 780, 587, 825

Clandonald is a hamlet in central Alberta, Canada within the County of Vermilion River. It is located approximately 28 kilometres (17 mi) north of Highway 16 and 58 kilometres (36 mi) northwest of Lloydminster.

The hamlet takes its name from Clan Donald, a Highland Scottish clan.

== Demographics ==
Population history of Clandonald
Year	Pop.	±%
1941	142	—
1951	226	+59.2%
1956	238	+5.3%
1961	211	−11.3%
1966	185	−12.3%
1971	119	−35.7%
1976	136	+14.3%
1981	111	−18.4%
1986	165	+48.6%
1991	135	−18.2%
1991A	137	+1.5%
1996	146	+6.6%
2001	110	−24.7%
2006	124	+12.7%
2011	109	−12.1%
2016	109	+0.0%
2021	117	+7.3%
Source: Statistics Canada

In the 2021 Census of Population conducted by Statistics Canada, Clandonald had a population of 117 living in 46 of its 56 total private dwellings, a change of 7.3% from its 2016 population of 109. With a land area of 0.47 km^{2} (0.18 sq mi), it had a population density of 248.9/km^{2} (644.7/sq mi) in 2021.

As a designated place in the 2016 Census of Population conducted by Statistics Canada, Clandonald had a population of 109 living in 46 of its 61 total private dwellings, a change of 0% from its 2011 population of 109. With a land area of 0.48 km^{2} (0.19 sq mi), it had a population density of 227.1/km^{2} (588.1/sq mi) in 2016.

== See also ==
- List of communities in Alberta
- List of designated places in Alberta
- List of hamlets in Alberta
