= Vermilion, Alberta =

Vermilion
- Town
- Town of Vermilion
- Location of Vermilion in Alberta
- Coordinates: 53°21′15″N 110°51′10″W
- Country: Canada
- Province: Alberta
- Region: Central Alberta
- Census division: 10
- Municipal district: County of Vermilion River
- Founded: 1902
- Incorporated: 1906

Government
  - Mayor: Robert Snow
  - Governing body: Vermilion Town Council

Area (2021)
  - Land: 12.72 km^{2} (4.91 sq mi)
- Elevation: 580 m (1,900 ft)

Population (2021)
  - Total: 3,948
  - Density: 310.4/km^{2} (804/sq mi)
- Time zone: UTC−06:00 (Alberta Time)
- Forward sortation area: T9X
- Area code: +1-780
- Highways: Highway 16; Highway 41
- Waterway: Vermilion River
- Website: Official website

Vermilion is a town in central Alberta, Canada that is surrounded by the County of Vermilion River. It is at the intersection of Highway 16 (Yellowhead Highway) and Highway 41 (Buffalo Trail), approximately 60 kilometres (37 mi) west of Lloydminster and 192 kilometres (119 mi) east of Edmonton.

== History ==
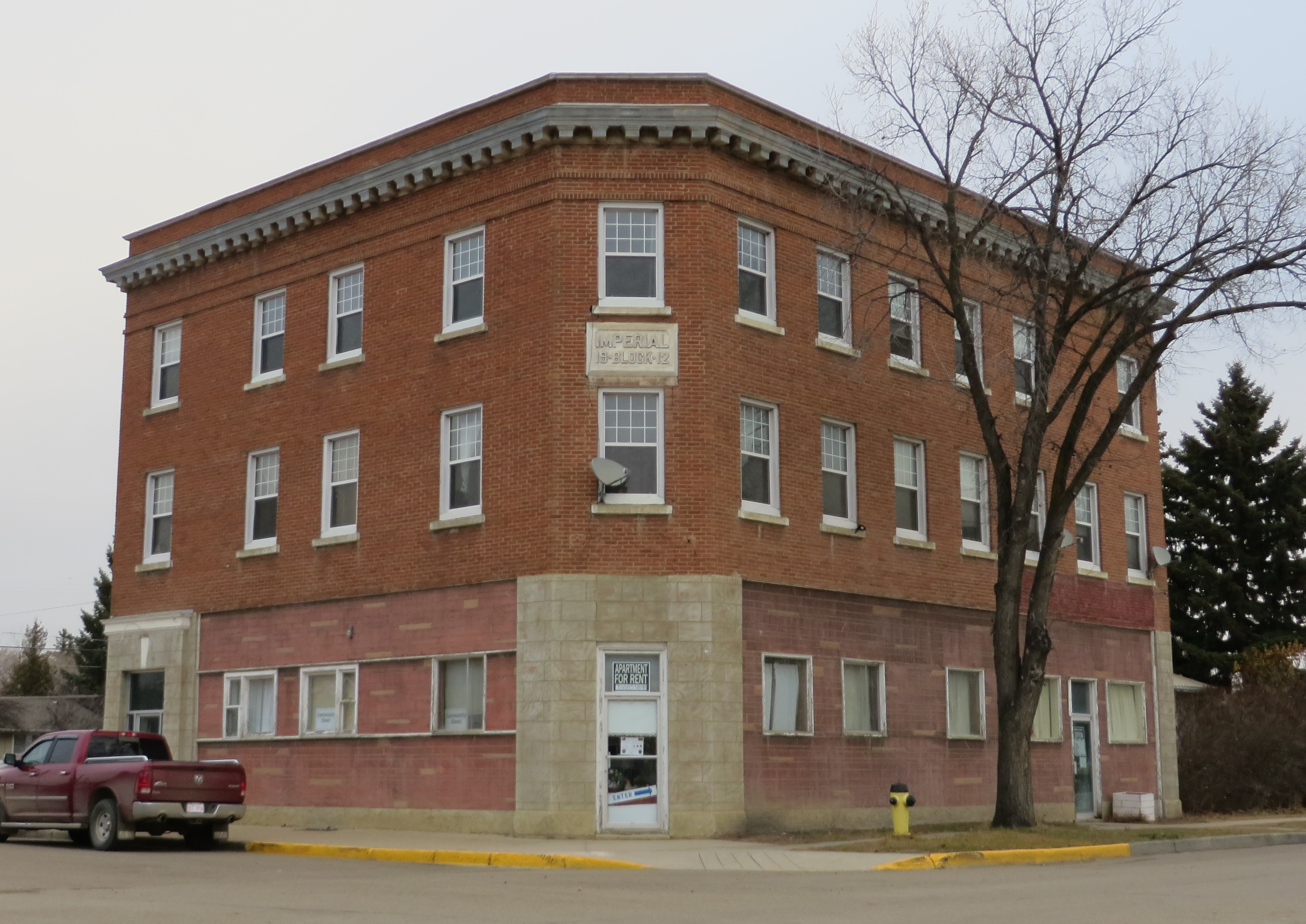
The 1912 Imperial Block in Vermilion

It was not until 1902 that a significant number of settlers arrived in this area of Alberta, mostly of British ethnic background coming from the east. Just west of Vermilion is the line between British and those of Ukrainian ethnic background having travelled mostly from the west.

In 1904, a post office was established at Breage approximately 5 km (3.1 mi) east of the present townsite.

In 1905, the Canadian Northern Railway arrived and a station was built. The post office was relocated from Breage. Throughout the days of steam, the railway was important to Vermilion. Vermilion was used as a divisional point. It had a water tower to resupply engines, a large roundhouse, an extensive yard, a wye, a turntable, and a bunkhouse for engine crews. With the decline of steam power in the late 1950s and early 1960s, the railway became less important.

In early 1906, Vermilion was incorporated as a village and then as a town later in the same year. The name Vermilion comes from the red clay found in the river valley. In fact, one of the first businesses in Vermilion was the brick factory which operated from 1906 until 1914. Some Vermilion buildings built from brick from this factory are still standing.

The first newspaper to publish in the Vermilion area was the Vermilion Signal which was founded and edited by William Bleasdell Cameron. (a survivor of the Frog Lake Massacre). In 1909, S.R.P. Cooper established the Vermilion Standard, which continues to publish to this day.

In 1911, the provincial government established three demonstration farms near Olds, Fairview, and just west of the Vermilion townsite. The Vermilion Board of Trade had lobbied the government for a demonstration farm and or college. When the Vermilion School of Agriculture officially opened on November 17, 1913, it became the first of the provincial agricultural colleges to open its door. The Vermilion School of Agriculture has had several name changes in the intervening years including Vermilion Agricultural and Vocational College and Vermilion College before becoming Lakeland College in 1975.

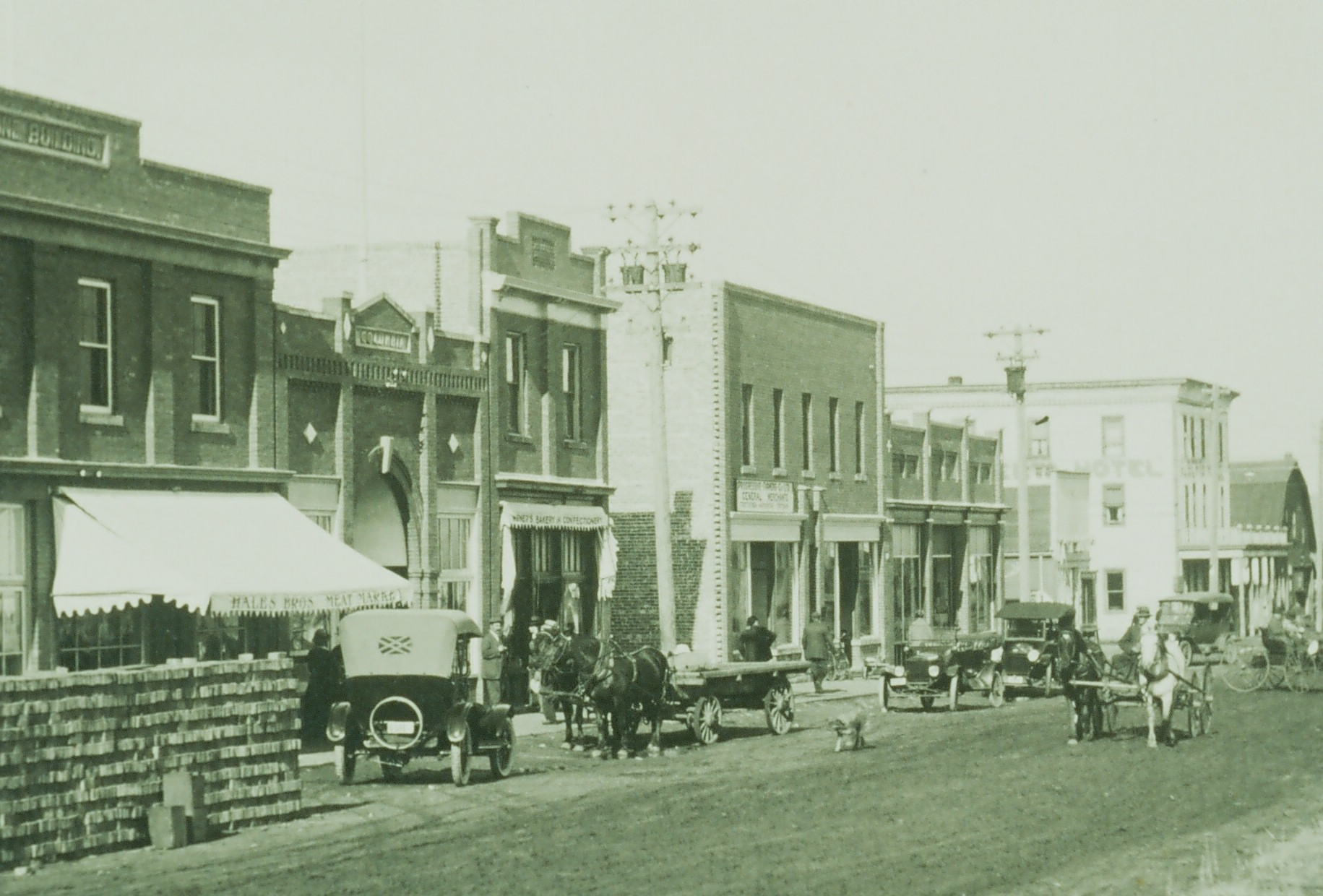
Looking northeast along 49th Avenue, 1912

Like other communities on the prairies in the early years of the 20th century, Vermilion experienced an extensive fire. Occurring on April 10, 1918, the fire destroyed 28 stores and business blocks.

Two Vermilion businesses have operated since before the town was incorporated. Craig's, a department store, and Long's, a drugstore, have been at the same downtown locations since 1905.

== Demographics ==
In the 2021 Census of Population conducted by Statistics Canada, the Town of Vermilion had a population of 3,948 living in 1,678 of its 1,976 total private dwellings, a change of −3.3% from its 2016 population of 4,084. With a land area of 12.72 km^{2} (4.91 sq mi), it had a population density of 310.4/km^{2} (803.9/sq mi) in 2021.

The population of the Town of Vermilion according to its 2017 municipal census is 4,150, a change of −8.7% from its 2012 municipal census population of 4,545.

In the 2016 Census of Population conducted by Statistics Canada, the Town of Vermilion recorded a population of 4,084 living in 1,753 of its 1,988 total private dwellings, a 3.9% change from its 2011 population of 3,930. With a land area of 12.93 km^{2} (4.99 sq mi), it had a population density of 315.9/km^{2} (818.1/sq mi) in 2016.

== Mayor and council ==
The Mayor of the Town of Vermilion is Robert Snow The Council for the Town of Vermilion is Paul Conlon, Justin Clark, Bruce Macduff, Kevin Martin, Sherry Martin, and Kellen Snelgrove https://www.vermilion.ca/council-administration/mayor-council/

== Economy ==
The economy is largely driven by the service industry to agriculture and oilfield, with Education (Lakeland College) being a secondary economic driver. Situated at the intersection of Hwy 16 and Hwy 41 and being within an hour drive of most of the larger communities east of Edmonton to Saskatchewan, Vermilion has started to see more economic activity centered around various service industries. Vermilion's historic downtown is one of the last remaining traditional prairie downtowns. It includes many century old buildings that house a variety of locally owned businesses that range from large farm implement dealerships, clothing and outdoors boutiques, to plumbers, restaurants, and a modern large Co-op grocery store.

== Arts and culture ==
The Vermilion Agricultural Society hosts one of the largest and oldest agricultural fairs in western Canada. The annual Vermilion Fair, which started in 1906, begins with a parade on Thursday morning and lasts a total of three days the last weekend in July. Vermilion is home to the main campus of Lakeland College, that includes the Alumni Theatre which hosts various concerts and recitals throughout the year through local clubs such as the Vermilion Folk Club, Vermilion Allied Arts, and others.

== Attractions ==
The Vermilion Provincial Park is located on the northwest side of the town. It includes camping, fishing, canoeing and trails for hiking, cycling and cross-country skiing.

== Education ==
The town has two public schools: Vermilion Elementary (K-6) and J.R. Robson Secondary (7–12), and one Catholic school, St. Jerome's School (K-12). The School of Hope, a home school, has its central office in Vermilion.

The town also attracts students from throughout Canada to Lakeland College. Lakeland offers certificate, diploma, applied degree, university transfer, apprenticeship, and pre-employment programs. Programming at the Vermilion campus includes agricultural sciences, business, environmental sciences, fire and emergency response, human services, interior design technology, and trades and technology. Lakeland's residence village is home to more than 500 students.

== Media ==
Vermilion's local weekly newspapers are the coffee news, Vermilion Standard and the Vermilion and Area Voice.

== Notable people ==
- Brandon Baddock (born 1995), a professional ice hockey player
- Bill Flett (1943–1999), a former NHL player
- Ernie Isley (born 1937), a politician in the Legislative Assembly of Alberta
- Alison Jackson (born 1988), an Olympic racing cyclist
- Ron Jones (born 1951), a former NHL player
- Ernie Kenny (1907–1970), a former NHL player
- Susan Massitti (born 1962 or 1963), a Winter Olympic speed skater
- Brent MacNab (1931–2020), a former professional ice hockey player
- Grant McNeill (born 1983), a former NHL player
- Charlie Mead (1921–2014), a former MLB player
- Jean Paré (1927 - 2022), author of Company's Coming cookbooks
- Beckie Scott (born 1974), a Winter Olympic cross-country skier and gold medalist
- Lloyd Snelgrove (born 1956), a politician in the Legislative Assembly of Alberta
- Jeff Woywitka (born 1983), a former NHL player

== See also ==
- List of communities in Alberta
- List of towns in Alberta
