= Islay, Alberta =

Islay
- Hamlet
- Location of Islay Islay (Canada)
- Coordinates: 53°23′38″N 110°32′20″W
- Country: Canada
- Province: Alberta
- Region: Central Alberta
- Census division: 10
- Municipal district: County of Vermilion River

Government
  - Type: Unincorporated
  - Governing body: County of Vermilion River Council

Area (2021)
  - Land: 0.6 km^{2} (0.23 sq mi)

Population (2021)
  - Total: 177
  - Density: 296.8/km^{2} (769/sq mi)
- Time zone: UTC−06:00 (Alberta Time)
- Area codes: 780, 587, 825

Islay (/ˈaɪli/) is a hamlet in central Alberta, Canada within the County of Vermilion River. Previously an incorporated municipality, Islay dissolved from village status on March 15, 1944, to become part of the Municipal District of Vermilion Valley No. 482. The community was named after Islay, in Scotland, the ancestral home of pioneer settlers.

Islay is located 6 kilometres (3.7 mi) north of Highway 16, approximately 36 kilometres (22 mi) west of Lloydminster. Its first school opened in 1907.

== Demographics ==
In the 2021 Census of Population conducted by Statistics Canada, Islay had a population of 177 living in 77 of its 84 total private dwellings, a change of −9.2% from its 2016 population of 195. With a land area of 0.6 km^{2} (0.23 sq mi), it had a population density of 295.0/km^{2} (764.0/sq mi) in 2021.

As a designated place in the 2016 Census of Population conducted by Statistics Canada, Islay had a population of 195 living in 80 of its 95 total private dwellings, a change of −6.3% from its 2011 population of 208. With a land area of 0.65 km^{2} (0.25 sq mi), it had a population density of 300.0/km^{2} (777.0/sq mi) in 2016.

== See also ==
- List of communities in Alberta
- List of designated places in Alberta
- List of former urban municipalities in Alberta
- List of hamlets in Alberta
