= Iron River, Alberta =

Iron River
- Hamlet
- Location of Iron River in Alberta
- Coordinates: 54.441°N 110.909°W
- Country: Canada
- Province: Alberta
- Census division: No. 12
- Municipal district: Municipal District of Bonnyville No. 87
- Time zone: UTC−06:00 (Alberta Time)

Iron River is a hamlet in central Alberta, Canada within the Municipal District of Bonnyville No. 87. It is located on Highway 55, approximately 29 km (18 mi) northwest of Bonnyville and 47 km (29 mi) west of Cold Lake.

== See also ==
- List of hamlets in Alberta
