= Vegreville =

- Town
- Town of Vegreville
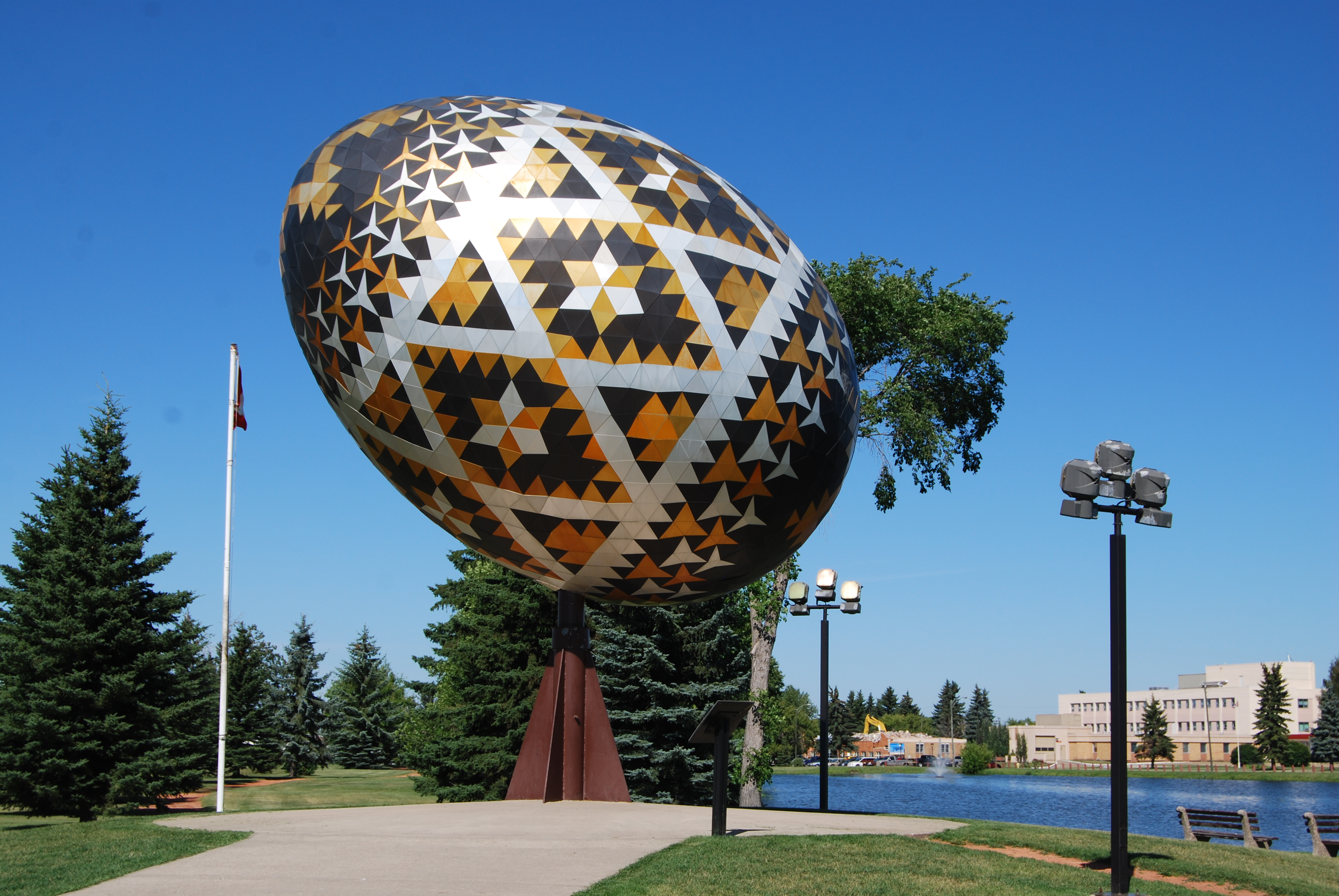
- Vegreville egg

- Location of Vegreville in Alberta Vegreville (Canada)
- Coordinates: 53°29′44″N 112°03′06″W
- Country: Canada
- Province: Alberta
- Region: Central Alberta
- Census division: 10
- Municipal district: County of Minburn No. 27
- Incorporated
  - Village: April 4, 1906
  - Town: August 15, 1906

Government
  - Mayor: Tim MacPhee
  - Governing body: Vegreville Town Council
  - MP: Shannon Stubbs (Lakeland-Cons)
  - MLA: Jackie Armstrong Homeniuk (Fort Saskatchewan-Vegreville-UCP)

Area (2021)
  - Land: 14.08 km^{2} (5.44 sq mi)
- Elevation: 635 m (2,083 ft)

Population (2021)
  - Total: 5,689
  - Density: 404/km^{2} (1,050/sq mi)
- Time zone: UTC−06:00 (Alberta Time)
- Forward sortation area: T9C
- Area codes: +1-780, +1-587
- Highways: Highway 16; Highway 857
- Waterways: Vermilion River
- Website: Official website

Vegreville /ˈvɛɡrəvɪl/ (Ukrainian: Веґревіль) is a town in central Alberta, Canada. It is on Highway 16A approximately 103 km (64 mi) east of Edmonton, Alberta's capital city. It was incorporated as a town in 1906, and that year also saw the founding of the Vegreville Observer, a weekly newspaper for the region. It was named after a Roman Catholic Oblate missionary, Father Valentin Vegreville.

A large percentage of Vegreville's population is of Ukrainian Canadian descent, and it is home to the Vegreville egg, the world's second largest pysanka (Ukrainian Easter egg).

== Geography ==
=== Climate ===
Vegreville experiences a humid continental climate (Köppen climate classification Dfb).

Climate data for Vegreville
Month	Jan	Feb	Mar	Apr	May	Jun	Jul	Aug	Sep	Oct	Nov	Dec	Year
Record high humidex	9.1	6.7	19.1	26.2	31.4	36.8	38.7	40.1	32.9	25.3	17.6	11.0	40.1
Record high °C (°F)	10.3 (50.5)	15.0 (59.0)	19.1 (66.4)	29.0 (84.2)	33.5 (92.3)	35.7 (96.3)	35.4 (95.7)	34.7 (94.5)	35.5 (95.9)	28.5 (83.3)	19.0 (66.2)	11.3 (52.3)	35.7 (96.3)
Mean daily maximum °C (°F)	−7.9 (17.8)	−5.1 (22.8)	0.1 (32.2)	10.7 (51.3)	17.4 (63.3)	21.2 (70.2)	23.1 (73.6)	22.8 (73.0)	17.0 (62.6)	9.7 (49.5)	−1.3 (29.7)	−6.4 (20.5)	8.4 (47.1)
Daily mean °C (°F)	−13.3 (8.1)	−10.8 (12.6)	−5.1 (22.8)	4.3 (39.7)	10.3 (50.5)	14.4 (57.9)	16.6 (61.9)	15.6 (60.1)	10.1 (50.2)	3.5 (38.3)	−6.3 (20.7)	−11.8 (10.8)	2.3 (36.1)
Mean daily minimum °C (°F)	−18.6 (−1.5)	−16.5 (2.3)	−10.3 (13.5)	−2.2 (28.0)	3.2 (37.8)	7.7 (45.9)	10.1 (50.2)	8.3 (46.9)	3.2 (37.8)	−2.8 (27.0)	−11.1 (12.0)	−17.1 (1.2)	−3.8 (25.2)
Record low °C (°F)	−44.9 (−48.8)	−46.5 (−51.7)	−42 (−44)	−32 (−26)	−10.7 (12.7)	−3 (27)	2.0 (35.6)	−3.5 (25.7)	−10.8 (12.6)	−23 (−9)	−36 (−33)	−42.5 (−44.5)	−46.9 (−52.4)
Record low wind chill	−57	−58	−51	−30	−15	−5	0	−3	−13	−25	−44	−52	−58
Average precipitation mm (inches)	15.1 (0.59)	11.0 (0.43)	15.9 (0.63)	21.3 (0.84)	37.1 (1.46)	60.6 (2.39)	76.3 (3.00)	51.8 (2.04)	40.5 (1.59)	12.8 (0.50)	12.9 (0.51)	12.3 (0.48)	367.5 (14.47)
Average rainfall mm (inches)	0.6 (0.02)	0.3 (0.01)	0.9 (0.04)	15.6 (0.61)	34.4 (1.35)	60.6 (2.39)	76.3 (3.00)	51.8 (2.04)	40.4 (1.59)	7.6 (0.30)	1.4 (0.06)	0.2 (0.01)	289.9 (11.41)
Average snowfall cm (inches)	14.8 (5.8)	10.7 (4.2)	14.6 (5.7)	5.7 (2.2)	2.7 (1.1)	0.0 (0.0)	0.0 (0.0)	0.0 (0.0)	0.1 (0.0)	5.2 (2.0)	11.5 (4.5)	12.2 (4.8)	77.5 (30.5)
Average precipitation days (≥ 0.2 mm)	6.8	5.0	5.5	6.5	8.8	12.4	14.2	10.4	9.9	6.7	6.4	5.7	98.0
Average rainy days (≥ 0.2 mm)	0.44	0.2	1.0	4.8	8.4	12.4	14.2	10.4	9.9	5.3	1.5	0.36	68.7
Average snowy days (≥ 0.2 cm)	6.4	4.9	4.9	2.2	0.62	0.0	0.0	0.04	0.04	1.8	5.2	5.4	31.5
Source: Environment Canada

== Demographics ==
In the 2021 Census of Population conducted by Statistics Canada, the Town of Vegreville had a population of 5,689 living in 2,463 of its 2,735 total private dwellings, a change of −0.3% from its 2016 population of 5,708. With a land area of 14.08 km^{2} (5.44 sq mi), it had a population density of 404.0/km^{2} (1,046.5/sq mi) in 2021.

In the 2016 Census of Population conducted by Statistics Canada, the Town of Vegreville recorded a population of 5,708 living in 2,429 of its 2,734 total private dwellings, a −0.2% change from its 2011 population of 5,717. With a land area of 14.08 km^{2} (5.44 sq mi), it had a population density of 405.4/km^{2} (1,050.0/sq mi) in 2016.

The Town of Vegreville's 2012 municipal census counted a population of 5,758, a 1.3% decrease over its 2010 municipal census population of 5,834.

Age distribution

- 0 to 19: 26.3%
- 20 to 64: 50.3%
- 65+: 23.3%

Mother tongue

- English: 4,185
- French: 105
- Other: 1,015

== Economy ==
The primary economic base of the town is agricultural.

== Arts and culture ==
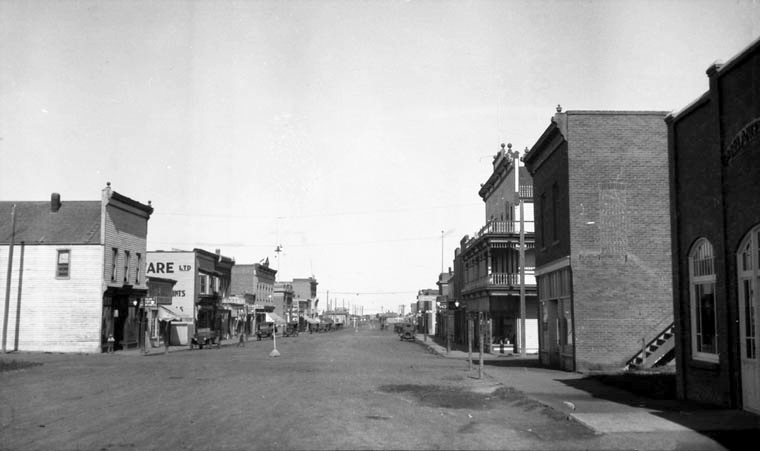
Vegreville, 1924

Due to Vegreville's close relationship with the 41 Combat Engineer Regiment, a Canadian Forces Reserve unit based in Edmonton, the Regiment is the only Canadian Forces unit with Freedom of the Town and parades held on Remembrance Day in the town.

=== Pysanka Festival ===
The Pysanka Festival, founded in 1973, occurs annually during the first weekend of July.

The 2015 festival featured grandstand shows, cultural variety shows, a pioneer village, Ukrainian music, a Zabava (evening Dance) featuring Kolomeyka music, folk arts creating Pysanka (Ukrainian Easter eggs), and a market place.

The festival has hosted the Cheremosh Ukrainian Dance Company, the Ukrainian Male Chorus of Edmonton, and the Kubasonics.

== Attractions ==
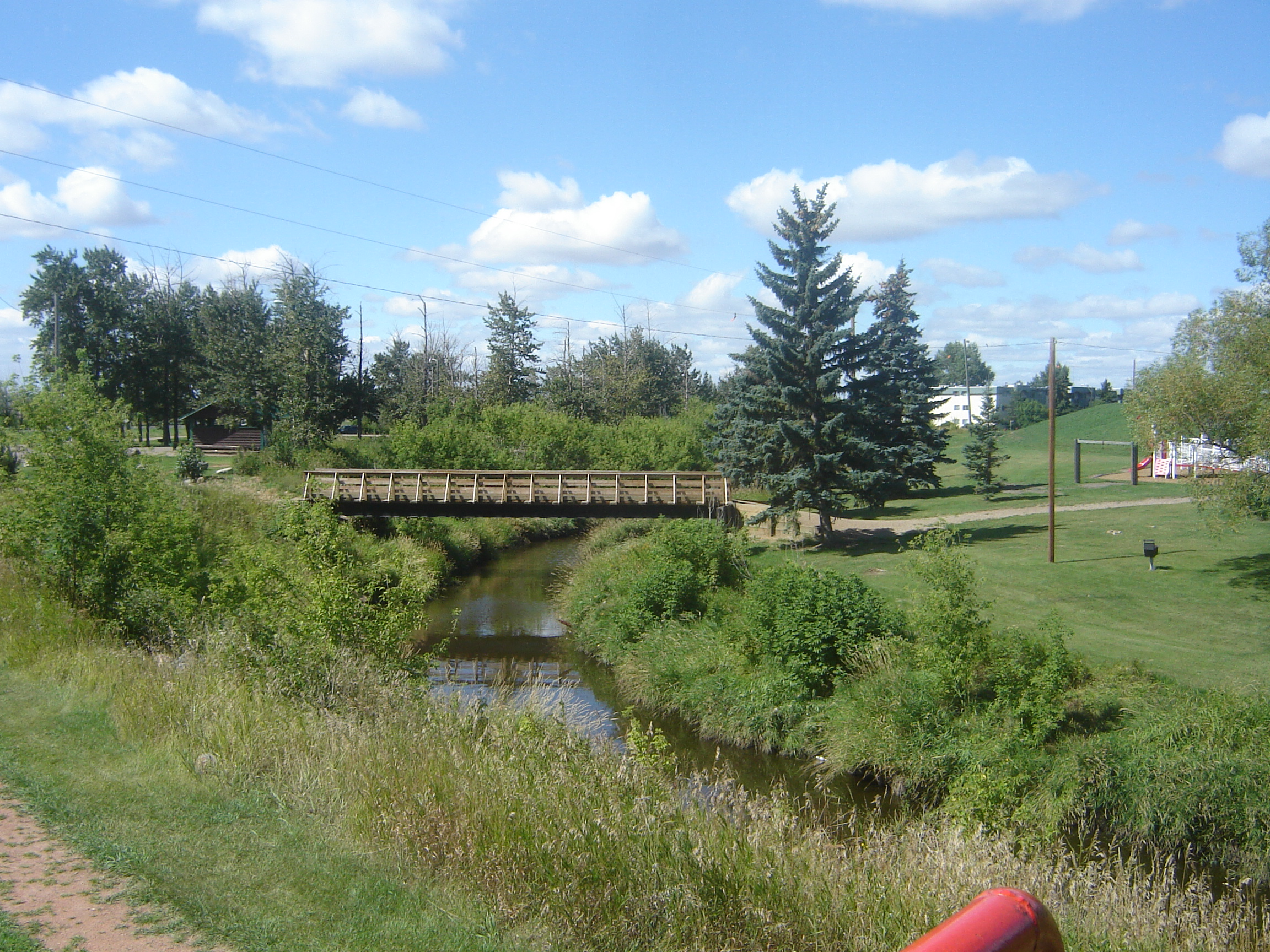
Vermilion River in Vegreville

Vegreville's pysanka, the second largest Ukrainian Easter egg in the world, was created to commemorate the 100th anniversary of the Royal Canadian Mounted Police in 1974 and to celebrate Vegreville's ethnic heritage. On July 6, 2009, the pysanka was one of four attractions featured on the first set of the Canadian Roadside Attractions Series of stamps issued by Canada Post.

== Media ==
Vegreville is serviced by the Vegreville News Advertiser weekly newspaper, an independently owned newspaper established in 1950. Vegreville is also serviced by local radio station Country 106.5.

== Infrastructure ==
The town is bisected by Canadian National Railway's Vegreville Subdivision, a rail line connecting Vegreville to Edmonton in the west and to Lloydminster in the east.

== Notable people ==
- Kyle Brodziak, NHL player
- George Bures Miller, artist
- Cam Cole, journalist
- Linda Craddock (b. 1952), visual artist
- Laurence Decore, Ukrainian Canadian lawyer, former mayor of Edmonton, Alberta, and former leader of the Alberta Liberal Party
- Roderick D. Fraser, 11th President of the University of Alberta (1995–2005)
- Herschel Hardin, writer, playwright, and politician
- Simma Holt, journalist, author, former Member of Parliament, and Member of the Order of Canada
- Dennis Kassian, NHL and WHA player
- Daymond Langkow, former NHL forward
- Don Mazankowski, politician and federal Deputy Prime Minister under Brian Mulroney
- Virgil P. Moshansky, Ukrainian Canadian jurist and former mayor of Vegreville
- David Motiuk, Catholic bishop of Ukrainian Catholic Eparchy of Edmonton
- Lillian Sarafinchan, Canadian visual artist, teacher, and production designer
- Brent Severyn, former NHL defenseman
- Valerie Sweeting, curler

== In popular culture ==
Season 4, episode 14 of Fox Television's The X-Files series entitled "Memento Mori" references Vegreville. FBI Agent Fox Mulder realizes the town name is the password needed to hack into a computer after discovering a Vegreville pysanka souvenir snow globe on the desk next to the computer.

== See also ==
- List of communities in Alberta
- List of towns in Alberta
