= Crestomere, Alberta =

Locality in Alberta, Canada

Coordinates: 52°40′05″N 113°55′00″W

Location of Crestomere Alberta

Crestomere is an unincorporated locality in central Alberta in Ponoka County, located on Highway 53, 45 kilometres (28 mi) north of Red Deer.
