= Tulaby Lake =

Lake in the state of Minnesota, United States

- Location within Minnesota
- Location: Becker and Mahnomen counties, Minnesota
- Coordinates: 47°9′6″N 95°36′12″W
- Type: lake

Tulaby Lake is a lake in Becker and Mahnomen counties, in the U.S. state of Minnesota.

Tulaby Lake was named for the freshwater fish Coregonus artedi, commonly known as the tullibee.

== See also ==
- List of lakes in Minnesota
