= Marwayne =

- Village
- Village of Marwayne
- Location within Alberta
- Coordinates: 53°30′58″N 110°19′31″W
- Country: Canada
- Province: Alberta
- Region: Alberta
- Census Division: No. 10
- Municipal district: County of Vermilion River
- Incorporated
  - Village: December 31, 1952

Government
  - Mayor: Chris Neureuter
  - Governing body: Marwayne Village Council

Area (2021)
  - Land: 1.6 km^{2} (0.62 sq mi)
- Elevation: 600 m (2,000 ft)

Population (2021)
  - Total: 543
  - Density: 339.3/km^{2} (879/sq mi)
- Time zone: UTC−06:00 (Alberta Time)
- Highways: 45; 897
- Website: Official website

Marwayne is a village in central Alberta, Canada. It is located 44 kilometres (27 mi) northwest of the city of Lloydminster and 21 kilometres (13 mi) west of the Saskatchewan border.

Marwayne lies at the intersection between Highway 45 and Highway 897. The economy is based on agriculture and ranching, with the oil and gas sector playing an important part as well.

The village's name is unusual in combining parts of a personal name and a place name. In commemorates the pioneer Marfleet family, who emigrated from Wainfleet, Lincolnshire, England. The first school in Marwayne opened in 1928.

== Demographics ==
In the 2021 Census of Population conducted by Statistics Canada, the Village of Marwayne had a population of 543 living in 231 of its 263 total private dwellings, a change of −3.7% from its 2016 population of 564. With a land area of 1.6 km^{2} (0.62 sq mi), it had a population density of 339.4/km^{2} (879.0/sq mi) in 2021.

The population of the Village of Marwayne according to its 2017 municipal census is 606, a change of −9.1% from its 2013 municipal census population of 667.

In the 2016 Census of Population conducted by Statistics Canada, the Village of Marwayne recorded a population of 564 living in 231 of its 245 total private dwellings, a −7.8% change from its 2011 population of 612. With a land area of 1.6 km^{2} (0.62 sq mi), it had a population density of 352.5/km^{2} (913.0/sq mi) in 2016.

== See also ==
- List of communities in Alberta
- List of villages in Alberta
