= Rivercourse, Alberta =

Hamlet in Alberta, Canada

Rivercourse
- Hamlet
- Location of Rivercourse Rivercourse (Canada)
- Coordinates: 53°00′57″N 110°03′15″W
- Country: Canada
- Province: Alberta
- Region: Central Alberta
- Census division: 10
- Municipal district: County of Vermilion River

Government
  - Type: Unincorporated
  - Governing body: County of Vermilion River Council

Population (2015)
  - Total: 16
- Time zone: UTC−06:00 (Alberta Time)
- Area codes: 780, 587, 825

Rivercourse is a hamlet in east-central Alberta, Canada within the County of Vermilion River. It is located 3 kilometres (1.9 mi) west of Highway 17, approximately 26 kilometres (16 mi) south of Lloydminster.

== Demographics ==
The population of Rivercourse according to the 2015 municipal census conducted by the County of Vermilion River is 16.

== See also ==
- List of communities in Alberta
- List of hamlets in Alberta
