= County of Vermilion River =

Municipal district in Alberta, Canada

- Municipal district
- Logo

- Location within Alberta
- Coordinates: 53°20′14″N 110°19′59″W
- Country: Canada
- Province: Alberta
- Region: Central Alberta
- Census division: 10
- Established: 1944
- Incorporated: 1964 (County)

Government
  - Reeve: Stacey Hryciuk
  - Governing body: County of Vermilion River Council: Marty Baker; Dale Swyripa, Reeve; Stacey Hryciuk, Lonnie Wolgien; Jason Stelmaschuk; Clinton Murray; Leslie Cusack
  - Administrative office: Kitscoty

Area (2021)
  - Land: 5,420.13 km^{2} (2,092.72 sq mi)

Population (2021)
  - Total: 8,043
- Time zone: UTC−06:00 (Alberta Time)
- Website: vermilion-river.com

The County of Vermilion River is a municipal district located in the eastern part of central Alberta, Canada in Census Division No. 10. The municipal district was formerly named the County of Vermilion River No. 24 prior to an official name change that became effective on September 13, 2006.

The administrative offices of the County of Vermilion River are located at Kitscoty. The Vermilion River flows through the County and is the namesake of the region.

The Yellowhead Highway and Buffalo Trail are major transportation routes in the County. Several communities in the County such as Vermilion and Kitscoty are serviced by CN Rail.

== Geography ==
=== Communities and localities ===
The following urban municipalities are surrounded by the County of Vermilion River.

Cities

- Lloydminster (Alberta portion)

Towns

- Vermilion

Villages

- Kitscoty (location of municipal office)
- Marwayne
- Paradise Valley

Summer villages

- none

The following hamlets are located within the County of Vermilion River.

Hamlets

- Blackfoot
- Clandonald
- Dewberry
- Islay
- McLaughlin
- Rivercourse
- Streamstown
- Tulliby Lake

The following localities are located within the County of Vermilion River.

Localities

- Alcurve
- Auburndale
- Borradaile
- Claysmore
- Coop Trailer Park
- Dina
- Earlie
- Grandview Estates
- Greenlawn
- Hazeldine
- Hindville
- Indian Lake Meadows
- Koknee
- Landonville
- Lea Park

- McDonaldville
- Morningold Estates
- Moyerton
- New Lindsay
- Oxville
- Ridgeclough
- Robinwood Acres
- Sidcup
- Silver Birch Farms
- South Ferriby
- Staplehurst
- Tolland
- Vanesti
- Wildmere
- Willowlea

== Demographics ==
In the 2021 Census of Population conducted by Statistics Canada, the County of Vermilion River had a population of 8,043 living in 3,015 of its 3,341 total private dwellings, a change of −4.9% from its 2016 population of 8,453. With a land area of 5,420.13 km^{2} (2,092.72 sq mi), it had a population density of 1.5/km^{2} (3.8/sq mi) in 2021.

In the 2016 Census of Population conducted by Statistics Canada, the County of Vermilion River had a population of 8,267 living in 2,981 of its 3,268 total private dwellings, a 4.6% change from its 2011 population of 7,905. With a land area of 5,519.75 km^{2} (2,131.19 sq mi), it had a population density of 1.5/km^{2} (3.9/sq mi) in 2016.

The population of the County of Vermilion River according to its 2015 municipal census is 8,116, a 2.7% change from its 2008 municipal census population of 7,900.

== Attractions ==
Several golf courses are located in the county, among them Lloydminster Golf and Country Club, Lea Park Golf Club, Rolling Green Fairways Golf Course & Campground, Paradise Valley Golf Course and Vermilion Golf Course.

Campgrounds are found at Jubilee Regional Park, Vermilion Provincial Park, Nothing Barred Ranch, Camp’N Rv and Iron River Ranch.

The Vermilion Heritage Museum is located in the town of Vermilion. Other museums include Climbing Through Time Museum in Paradise Valley, Dewberry Valley Museum in Dewberry and Morrison Museum of the Country School in Islay.

The Lea Park Professional Rodeo is held every year in June.

Other recreational activities are hiking in the Vermilion Provincial Park and Nothing Barred Ranch (cross-country skiing in winter), fishing for rainbow trout at the Vermilion Provincial Park Trout Pond or pike and perch at Raft Lake.

== See also ==
- List of communities in Alberta
- List of municipal districts in Alberta
