= McLaughlin, Alberta =

McLaughlin
- Hamlet
- Location of McLaughlin McLaughlin (Canada)
- Coordinates: 52°59′23″N 110°09′54″W
- Country: Canada
- Province: Alberta
- Region: Central Alberta
- Census division: 10
- Municipal district: County of Vermilion River

Government
  - Type: Unincorporated
  - Governing body: County of Vermilion River Council

Population (2015)
  - Total: 41
- Time zone: UTC−06:00 (Alberta Time)
- Area codes: 780, 587, 825

McLaughlin is a hamlet in central Alberta, Canada within the County of Vermilion River. It is 9 km (5.6 mi) west of Highway 17, approximately 33 km (21 mi) southwest of Lloydminster.

== Demographics ==
Population history of McLaughlin
Year	Pop.	±%
1941	103	—
1951	84	−18.4%
1956	73	−13.1%
1961	52	−28.8%
1966	62	+19.2%
1971	58	−6.5%
1976	31	−46.6%
1981	63	+103.2%
1986	55	−12.7%
1991	41	−25.5%
Source: Statistics Canada

The population of McLaughlin according to the 2015 municipal census conducted by the County of Vermilion River is 41.

== See also ==
- List of communities in Alberta
- List of hamlets in Alberta
