= Tulliby Lake =

- Hamlet
- Location of Tulliby Lake Tulliby Lake (Canada)
- Coordinates: 53°42′59″N 110°11′07″W
- Country: Canada
- Province: Alberta
- Region: Central Alberta
- Census division: 10
- Municipal district: County of Vermilion River

Government
  - Type: Unincorporated
  - Governing body: County of Vermilion River Council

Population (2015)
  - Total: 22
- Time zone: UTC−06:00 (Alberta Time)
- Area codes: 780, 587, 825

Tulliby Lake is a hamlet in central Alberta, Canada within the County of Vermilion River. It is located approximately 23 kilometres (14 mi) north of Highway 45 and 50 kilometres (31 mi) northwest of Lloydminster.

== Climate ==
Climate data for Tulliby Lake
Month	Jan	Feb	Mar	Apr	May	Jun	Jul	Aug	Sep	Oct	Nov	Dec	Year
Record high °C (°F)	13 (55)	12.5 (54.5)	18 (64)	31.7 (89.1)	33.9 (93.0)	35.6 (96.1)	35.5 (95.9)	38 (100)	34.5 (94.1)	29 (84)	18.3 (64.9)	8 (46)	38 (100)
Mean daily maximum °C (°F)	−11.4 (11.5)	−7.5 (18.5)	−0.6 (30.9)	10.9 (51.6)	18.4 (65.1)	21.9 (71.4)	23.6 (74.5)	22.9 (73.2)	16.5 (61.7)	10 (50)	−2.6 (27.3)	−10.6 (12.9)	7.6 (45.7)
Daily mean °C (°F)	−16.5 (2.3)	−13 (9)	−6.3 (20.7)	4.4 (39.9)	11.1 (52.0)	15 (59)	16.8 (62.2)	15.7 (60.3)	10 (50)	4.1 (39.4)	−7 (19)	−15.2 (4.6)	1.6 (34.9)
Mean daily minimum °C (°F)	−21.4 (−6.5)	−18.5 (−1.3)	−12 (10)	−2.2 (28.0)	3.8 (38.8)	8.1 (46.6)	10 (50)	8.5 (47.3)	3.5 (38.3)	−1.9 (28.6)	−11.5 (11.3)	−19.8 (−3.6)	−4.5 (23.9)
Record low °C (°F)	−45 (−49)	−42 (−44)	−39.4 (−38.9)	−27.5 (−17.5)	−9 (16)	−3.5 (25.7)	1 (34)	−3 (27)	−9 (16)	−23.5 (−10.3)	−36.5 (−33.7)	−46.1 (−51.0)	−46.1 (−51.0)
Average precipitation mm (inches)	18.6 (0.73)	13.2 (0.52)	18.6 (0.73)	22.8 (0.90)	18.6 (0.73)	22.8 (0.90)	72.6 (2.86)	79.8 (3.14)	62.2 (2.45)	13.7 (0.54)	18.5 (0.73)	22.2 (0.87)	424.8 (16.72)
Source: Environment Canada

== Demographics ==
The population of Tulliby Lake according to the 2015 municipal census conducted by the County of Vermilion River is 22.

== Amenities ==
Tulliby Lake has a Petro-Canada cardlock fuel station, a community centre, a natural-ice skating rink, and an open-air riding arena.

== See also ==
- List of communities in Alberta
- List of hamlets in Alberta
