= Tabar =

Tabar may refer to:

- The Punjabi word for "family"
  - Tabbar, 2021 Indian television series
- The Pashto word for "tribe" in the Pashtun tribal structure
- Tabar (axe), a type of battle axe from Asia
  - INS Tabar (F44), an Indian naval vessel
- Tabar, Iran, a village in North Khorasan Province, Iran
- Tabar, Isfahan, a village in Isfahan Province, Iran
- The Tabar Islands, AKA Tabar Group, an island group in Papua New Guinea
- Tabar, Navarre, a village in Navarre, Spain, part of Urraúl Bajo Municipality
- Tabar Rural District, in North Khorasan Province, Iran
- Tabar (surname)

== See also ==
- Tabara (disambiguation)
- Taber, Alberta, a town in southern Alberta, Canada
- Tabor (disambiguation)
- Tabaristan
