= Municipal District of Taber =

Municipal district in Alberta, Canada

- Municipal district
- Logo

- Location within Alberta
- Country: Canada
- Province: Alberta
- Region: Southern Alberta
- Census division: 2
- Established: 1954
- Incorporated: 1954

Government
  - Reeve: Tamara Miyanaga
  - Governing body: MD of Taber Council
  - Administrative office: Taber

Area (2021)
  - Land: 4,160.47 km^{2} (1,606.37 sq mi)

Population (2021)
  - Total: 7,447
  - Density: 1.8/km^{2} (4.7/sq mi)
  - Municipal census (2016): 7,173
- Time zone: UTC−06:00 (Alberta Time)
- Website: mdtaber.ab.ca

The Municipal District of Taber is a municipal district (MD) in southern Alberta, Canada. It is located in Census Division 2.

== Geography ==
=== Communities and localities ===
The following urban municipalities are surrounded by the MD of Taber.

Cities

- none

Towns

- Taber (location of municipal office)
- Vauxhall

Villages

- Barnwell

Summer villages

- none

The following hamlets are located within the MD of Taber.

Hamlets

- Enchant
- Grassy Lake
- Hays
- Johnson's Addition
- Purple Springs

The following localities are located within the MD of Taber.

Localities

- Antonio
- Armelgra
- Barney
- Cranford
- Elcan
- Fincastle
- Grantham
- Retlaw
- Scope

Other places

== Demographics ==
In the 2021 Census of Population conducted by Statistics Canada, the MD of Taber had a population of 7,447 living in 1,971 of its 2,119 total private dwellings, a change of 4.9% from its 2016 population of 7,098. With a land area of 4,160.47 km^{2} (1,606.37 sq mi), it had a population density of 1.8/km^{2} (4.6/sq mi) in 2021.

In the 2016 Census of Population conducted by Statistics Canada, the MD of Taber had a population of 7,098 living in 1,857 of its 2,081 total private dwellings, a 3.6% change from its 2011 population of 6,851. With a land area of 4,201.65 km^{2} (1,622.27 sq mi), it had a population density of 1.7/km^{2} (4.4/sq mi) in 2016.

The population of the MD of Taber according to its 2016 municipal census is 7,173, a 0.8% change from its 2013 municipal census population of 7,116. By its five hamlets, the 2016 municipal census population breaks down into 259 residents in Enchant, 815 in Grassy Lake, 163 in Hays, 130 in Johnson's Addition and 44 in Purple Springs, resulting in a remaining rural area population of 5,762.

== See also ==
- List of communities in Alberta
- List of municipal districts in Alberta
