= 2016 Alberta municipal censuses =

← 2015	March 1 – July 31, 2016	2017 →
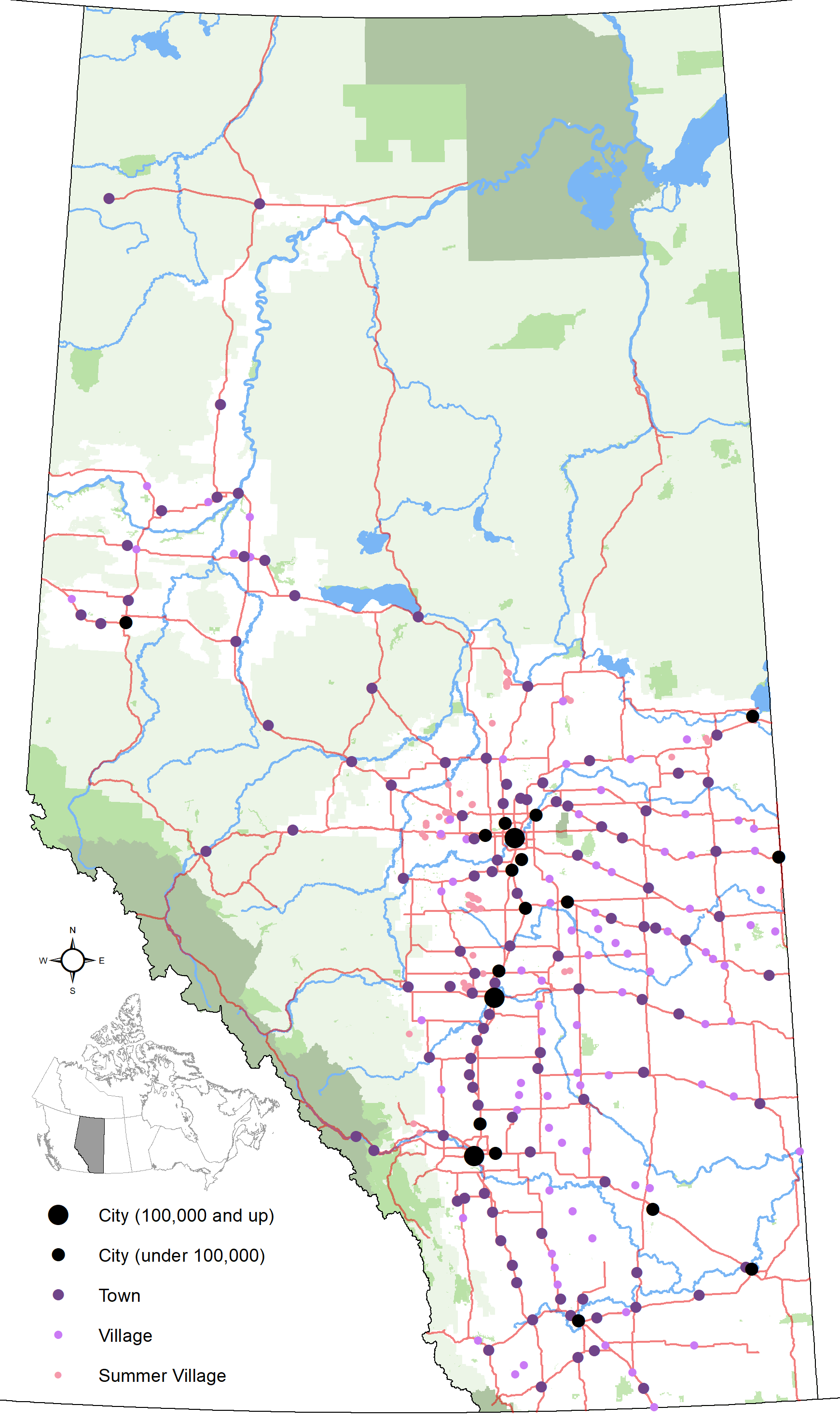
- Distribution of Alberta's 269 urban municipalities

Alberta has provincial legislation allowing its municipalities to conduct municipal censuses between April 1 and June 30 inclusive. Due to the concurrency of Statistics Canada conducting the Canada 2016 Census in May 2016, the Government of Alberta offered municipalities the option to alter their 2016 municipal census timeframes to either March 1 through May 31 or May 1 through July 31. Municipalities choose to conduct their own censuses for multiple reasons such as to better inform municipal service planning and provision, to capitalize on per capita based grant funding from higher levels of government, or to simply update their populations since the last federal census.

With the dissolution of the villages of Galahad and Strome on January 1, 2016, Alberta had 354 municipalities in 2016. Alberta Municipal Affairs recognized those conducted by 21 (5.9%) of these municipalities. By municipal status, it recognized those conducted by 11 of Alberta's 18 cities, 5 of 108 towns, 2 of 90 villages, and 3 of 64 municipal districts. (Note: No censuses were conducted among Alberta's 5 specialized municipalities, 51 summer villages, 3 special areas and 8 improvement districts.) In addition to those recognized by Municipal Affairs, a census was planned by the Village of Forestburg for 2016 but was subsequently deferred to 2017.

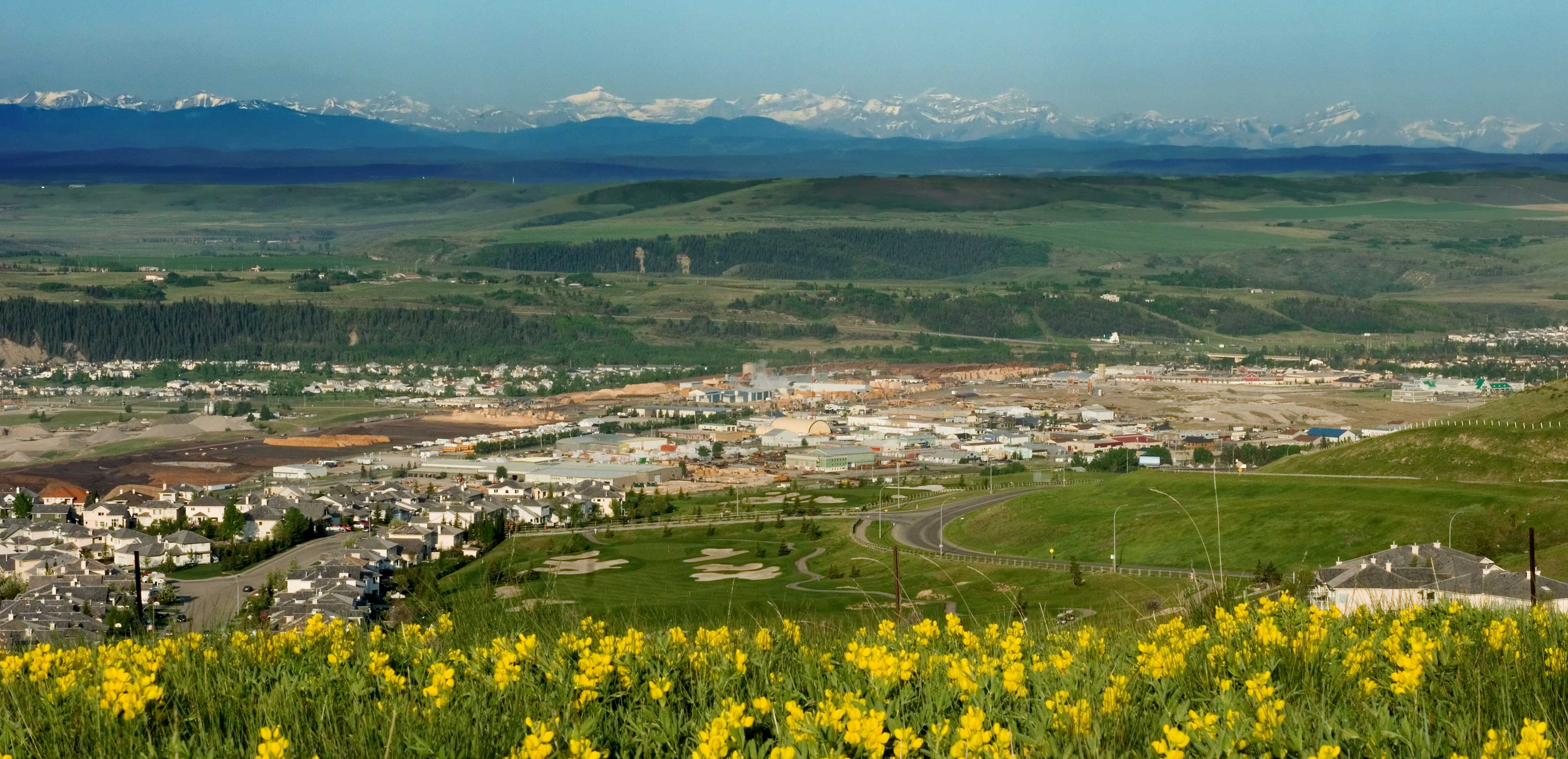
Cochrane, Alberta's second-largest town, surpassed a population of 25,000 in 2016.

Some municipalities achieved population milestones as a result of their 2016 censuses. Airdrie became the eighth city in Alberta to exceed 60,000 residents, while Leduc surpassed 30,000 people and Cochrane grew beyond the 25,000 mark. Edmonton fell short of the 900,000-mark by 553 people, while Red Deer dipped back below 100,000 residents after surpassing that milestone in 2015.

== Municipal census results ==
The following summarizes the results of the numerous municipal censuses conducted in 2016.

2016 municipal census summary				2011 federal census comparison				Previous municipal census comparison			
Municipality	Status	Census date	2016 pop.	2011 pop.	Absolute growth	Absolute change	Annual growth rate	Prev. pop.	Prev. census year	Absolute growth	Annual growth rate
Airdrie	City	April 7, 2016	61,842	42,564	19,278	45.3%	7.8%	58,690	2015	3,152	5.4%
Beaumont	Town	April 1, 2016	17,720	13,284	4,436	33.4%	5.9%	16,768	2015	952	5.7%
Blackfalds	Town	April 15, 2016	9,510	6,300	3,210	51%	8.6%	8,793	2015	717	8.2%
Calgary	City	April 1, 2016	1,235,171	1,096,833	138,338	12.6%	2.4%	1,230,915	2015	4,256	0.3%
Camrose	City	April 1, 2016	18,044	17,286	758	4.4%	0.9%	18,038	2014	6	0.0%
Chauvin	Village	May 19, 2016	345	334	11	3.3%	0.7%	340	2011	5	0.3%
Chestermere	City	May 2, 2016	19,715	14,824	4,891	33%	5.9%	18,496	2015	1,219	6.6%
Cochrane	Town	April 1, 2016	25,122	17,580	7,542	42.9%	7.4%	23,084	2015	2,038	8.8%
Edmonton	City	April 1, 2016	899,447	812,201	87,246	10.7%	2.1%	877,926	2014	21,521	1.2%
Forestburg	Village		(Note: The Village of Forestburg opted to defer its scheduled 2016 municipal census to 2017.)	831				880	2014		
Fort Saskatchewan	City	April 4, 2016	24,569	19,051	5,518	29%	5.2%	24,040	2015	529	2.2%
Kitscoty	Village	April 1, 2016	976	846	130	15.4%	2.9%	967	2013	9	0.3%
Lac La Biche County	Municipal district	May 11, 2016	8,544	8,402	142	1.7%	0.3%	9,094	2013	−550	−2.1%
Leduc	City	April 1, 2016	30,498	24,279	6,219	25.6%	4.7%	29,304	2015	1,194	4.1%
Lethbridge	City	April 1, 2016	96,828	83,517	13,311	15.9%	3.0%	94,804	2015	2,024	2.1%
Morinville	Town	April 15, 2016	9,893	8,569	1,324	15.5%	2.9%	9,402	2014	491	2.6%
MD of Opportunity No. 17	Municipal district	April 12, 2016	2,639	3,074	−435	-14.2%	−3.0%	3,214	2015	−575	−17.9%
Raymond	Town	April 4, 2016	4,202	3,743	459	12.3%	2.3%	4,139	2015	63	1.5%
Red Deer	City	April 1, 2016	99,832	90,564	9,268	10.2%	2.0%	100,807	2015	−975	−1.0%
Spruce Grove	City	April 6, 2016	33,640	26,171	7,469	28.5%	5.1%	32,036	2015	1,604	5.0%
St. Albert	City	March 7, 2016	64,645	61,466	3,179	5.2%	1.0%	63,255	2014	1,390	1.1%
MD of Taber	Municipal district	April 15, 2016	7,173	6,851	322	4.7%	0.9%	7,116	2013	57	0.3%

== Breakdowns ==
=== Hamlets ===
The following is a list of hamlet populations determined by 2016 municipal censuses conducted by Lac La Biche County and the Municipal District of Taber.

2016 municipal census summary			Previous census comparison			
Hamlet	Municipality	2016 population	Previous population	Previous census year	Absolute growth	Annual growth rate
Beaver Lake	Lac La Biche County	527	496	2011	31	1.2%
Enchant	MD of Taber	259	289	2013	−30	−3.6%
Grassy Lake	MD of Taber	815	778	2013	37	1.6%
Hays	MD of Taber	163	163	2013	0	0.0%
Hylo	Lac La Biche County	33	–	–	–	–
Johnson's Addition	MD of Taber	130	115	2013	15	4.2%
Lac La Biche	Lac La Biche County	2,682	2,895	2013	−213	−2.5%
Plamondon	Lac La Biche County	348	344	2013	4	0.4%
Purple Springs	MD of Taber	44	41	2013	3	2.4%
Venice	Lac La Biche County	22	–	–	–	–

== Shadow population counts ==
Alberta Municipal Affairs defines shadow population as "temporary residents of a municipality who are employed by an industrial or commercial establishment in the municipality for a minimum of 30 days within a municipal census year." Lac La Biche County conducted a shadow population count in 2016. The following presents the results of this count for comparison with its concurrent municipal census results.

Municipality	Status	Municipal census population	Shadow population	Combined population
Lac La Biche County	Municipal district	8,544	987	9,531

== See also ==
- 2013 Alberta municipal elections
- List of communities in Alberta
