= Tabir =

Tabir may refer to:

- A tabor, or Wagon fort
- A drum, see Tabor (instrument)

== See also ==
- Tabeer (disambiguation)
- Tabar (disambiguation)
- Taber, Alberta, a town in southern Alberta, Canada
- Tabor (disambiguation)
