= Retlaw, Alberta =

Retlaw
- Unincorporated community
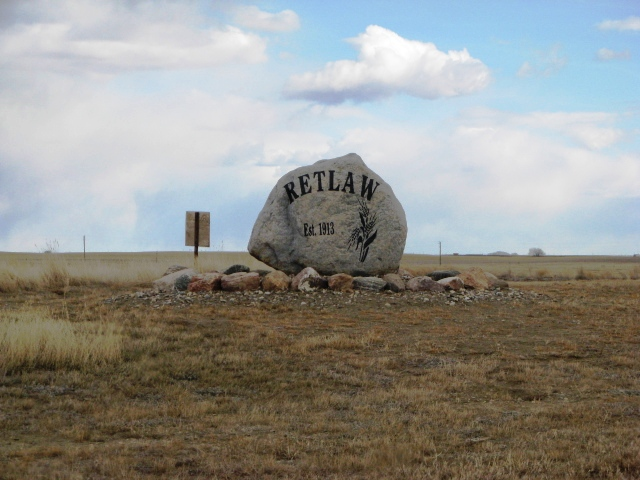
- Retlaw welcome sign erected by the Retlaw Historical Society.

- Location of Retlaw in Alberta
- Coordinates: 50°04′08″N 112°15′48″W
- Country: Canada
- Province: Alberta
- Region: Southern Alberta
- Census division: 2
- Municipal district: Municipal District of Taber
- Post Office Founded: Barney 1910
- Incorporated (village): 1913
- Dissolved: March 1, 1939

Government
  - Governing body: Municipal District of Taber; Retlaw Historical Society
  - MP: Jim Hillyer
  - MLA: Gary Bikman
- Elevation: 778 m (2,552 ft)
- Time zone: UTC−06:00 (Alberta Time)
- Postal code span: ?
- Area code: +1-403
- Highways: Highway 524; Highway 864
- Railways: Canadian Pacific Railway (defunct)

Retlaw is an unincorporated community located in the Municipal District of Taber, Alberta, Canada. The community once had a peak population of over 250 citizens and was incorporated under the status of a village until it was dissolved to become under the jurisdiction of Improvement District No. 96 on March 1, 1939. Retlaw is located 2 km (1 mi) west of Highway 864, 6 km (3 mi) west of Vauxhall, 42 km (26 mi) northwest of Taber, and 75 km (46 mi) southwest of Brooks.

== History ==
Retlaw Union/United Church

In 1910, the original post-office in the region was originally called "Barney." Three years later, when the Canadian Pacific Railway station arrived, however, it was dubbed "Retlaw". The name was selected as a tribute to Walter R. Baker, a CPR official, as "Retlaw" is "Walter" spelled backwards.

Retlaw was expected to be a large community in its area, with features of similarly sized communities of its time including four grain elevators, a pool hall, hotel, CPR railway station, churches, blacksmith, and a number of other businesses. Due to the Province of Alberta bringing an irrigation canal that passed the nearby Town of Vauxhall in the 1920s, Retlaw was left in a dry land state causing the community to die off. By 1925 most of the Retlaw's inhabitants moved out into neighbouring communities, searching for a better way of life, some even bringing their homes and business with them. By 1957, only two families were left. Today very little is left of Retlaw. Only the restored Retlaw Union/United Church, a community centre, two houses, the blacksmith shop and a few foundations remain.

== Retlaw Union/United Church ==
Retlaw Church is an old Victorian style church located in the hamlet of Retlaw, Alberta. The church was built in the 1910s. The church, like the town, had sat empty and neglected for many years until the 1980s when local farmers came together and restored the church to its former glory. Every year the church holds family events such as Christmas dinners, plays, and church services on Sunday.

== See also ==
- List of communities in Alberta
- List of former urban municipalities in Alberta
- List of ghost towns in Alberta
- List of geographic names derived from anagrams and ananyms
