= Hays, Alberta =

Hays
- Hamlet
- Location of Hays Hays (Canada)
- Coordinates: 50°05′53″N 111°47′37″W
- Country: Canada
- Province: Alberta
- Region: Southern Alberta
- Census division: 2
- Municipal district: Municipal District of Taber

Government
  - Type: Unincorporated
  - Governing body: Municipal District of Taber Council

Area (2021)
  - Land: 1.51 km^{2} (0.58 sq mi)

Population (2021)
  - Total: 196
  - Density: 130/km^{2} (340/sq mi)
- Time zone: UTC−06:00 (Alberta Time)
- Area codes: 403, 587, 825

Hays is a hamlet in southern Alberta, Canada within the Municipal District of Taber. It is located at the intersection of Highway 524 and Highway 875 between Vauxhall and Redcliff. The Bow River is 3.3 kilometres (2.1 mi) to the north of the hamlet and the Oldman River is approximately 19 kilometres (12 mi) to the south. These two rivers converge to form the South Saskatchewan River approximately 20 kilometres (12 mi) to the southeast.

Hays is named after David Walker Hays (1878–1958), chief engineer and manager of the Canada Land and Irrigation Company from 1911 to 1951. Hays celebrated its 50th anniversary in 2002.

== History ==
The area was devoted to short-grass prairie ranching during the late 1800s and early 1900s. As early as 1912, a canal and irrigation works were constructed to deliver water to the area from the Bow River at Carseland, but no land was irrigated there until 1952 after PFRA (Prairie Farm Rehabilitation Administration), an agency of the Canada Department of Agriculture, purchased the assets of the Canada Land and Irrigation Company in 1950 for $2.25 million. It began a five-year construction program to renovate and expand the existing irrigation and water delivery works, and re-settle farmers to the area. The area was administered by PFRA as part of the Bow River Irrigation Project until 1974 when the irrigation works, its operation and maintenance were taken over by the formation of the Bow River Irrigation District. Currently about 33,000 acres (130 km^{2}) are irrigated in the vicinity of Hays. A unique feature of the landscape is the allotment of land by irregular shaped parcels, rather than regular shaped quarter sections. This was a design feature by PFRA engineers to minimize development costs, and to integrate surface drainage with water delivery to the irrigated parcels. This feature somewhat restricted the later development of these parcels for sprinkler irrigation.

== Demographics ==
In the 2021 Census of Population conducted by Statistics Canada, Hays had a population of 196 living in 79 of its 81 total private dwellings, a change of 30.7% from its 2016 population of 150. With a land area of 1.51 km^{2} (0.58 sq mi), it had a population density of 129.8/km^{2} (336.2/sq mi) in 2021.

As a designated place in the 2016 Census of Population conducted by Statistics Canada, Hays had a population of 150 living in 68 of its 76 total private dwellings, a change of 30.4% from its 2011 population of 115. With a land area of 1.54 km^{2} (0.59 sq mi), it had a population density of 97.4/km^{2} (252.3/sq mi) in 2016.

The Municipal District of Taber's 2016 municipal census counted a population of 163 in Hays, a 0% change from the hamlet's 2013 municipal census population of 163.

== See also ==
- List of communities in Alberta
- List of hamlets in Alberta
