= Kitscoty =

- Village
- Village of Kitscoty
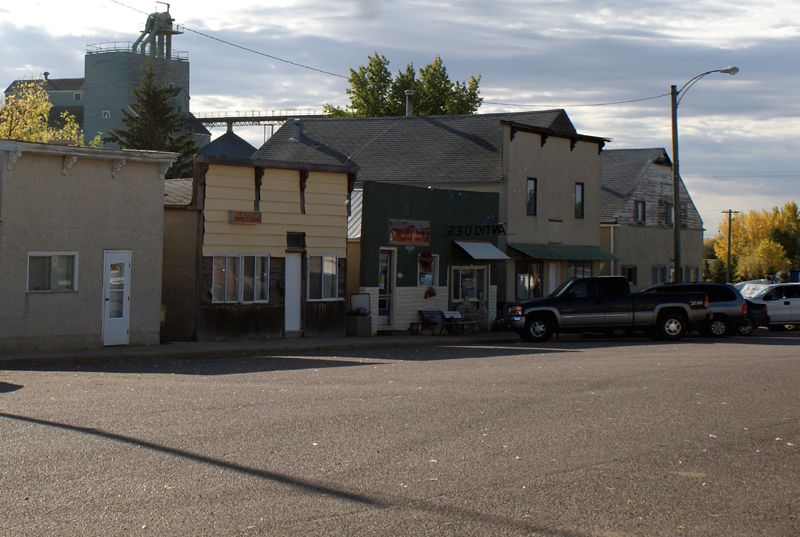
- Main Street, Kitscoty

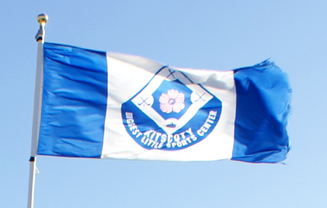
- Flag
- Nickname: Biggest Little Sports Centre in Alberta
- Location of Kitscoty in Alberta Kitscoty (Canada)
- Coordinates: 53°20′14″N 110°19′59″W
- Country: Canada
- Province: Alberta
- Region: Central Alberta
- Census division: 10
- Municipal district: County of Vermilion River
- Founded: 1905
- Incorporated
  - Village: March 22, 1911

Government
  - Mayor: Joyce Bell
  - Governing body: Kitscoty Village Council

Area (2021)
  - Land: 1.51 km^{2} (0.58 sq mi)
- Elevation: 670 m (2,200 ft)

Population (2021)
  - Total: 852
  - Density: 564.3/km^{2} (1,462/sq mi)
  - Municipal census (2016): 976
- Time zone: UTC−06:00 (Alberta Time)
- Forward sortation areas: T0B 2P0
- Area codes: 780, 587, 825
- Highways: 16, 897
- Website: Official website

Kitscoty is a village located in central Alberta, Canada. Situated at the junction of Highway 16 (Yellowhead Highway) and Highway 897 (the link to Cold Lake), the village is located approximately midway between Edmonton and Saskatoon (225 km (140 mi) and 295 km (183 mi) respectively). In addition, the village is within short commuting distance of Lloydminster. The CN railway tracks also pass through Kitscoty. The municipal office of the surrounding County of Vermilion River's is located in Kitscoty.

Kitscoty is located in rich agricultural area which has much heavy oil activity, both of which provide employment opportunities for the residents.

== History ==
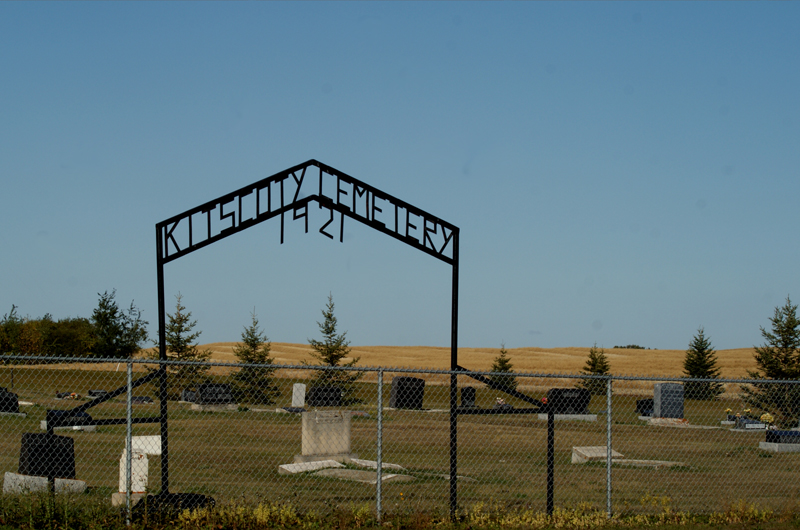
Kitscoty Cemetery

The first settlers came to the district in 1905, and was incorporated as a village in 1911. Kitscoty originally served a trading area stretching from Cold Lake in the north to the Battle River in the south. Kitscoty is named after a famous cromlech, 3 large stones in a tripod arrangement, found near a settlement in England known as Kit's Coty House.

== Demographics ==
In the 2021 Census of Population conducted by Statistics Canada, the Village of Kitscoty had a population of 852 living in 304 of its 335 total private dwellings, a change of −7.9% from its 2016 population of 925. With a land area of 1.51 km^{2} (0.58 sq mi), it had a population density of 564.2/km^{2} (1,461.4/sq mi) in 2021.

In the 2016 Census of Population conducted by Statistics Canada, the Village of Kitscoty recorded a population of 925 living in 317 of its 337 total private dwellings, a 9.3% change from its 2011 population of 846. With a land area of 1.51 km^{2} (0.58 sq mi), it had a population density of 612.6/km^{2} (1,586.6/sq mi) in 2016.

The population of the Village of Kitscoty according to its 2016 municipal census is 976, a 0.9% change from its 2013 municipal census population of 967.

== Education ==
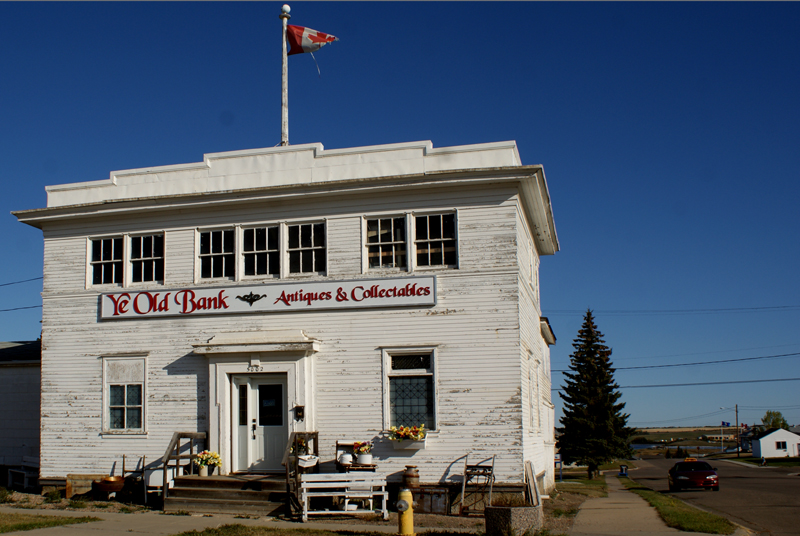
Kitscoty

There is an elementary school and a junior/senior high school within the village.

== See also ==
- List of communities in Alberta
- List of villages in Alberta
