= Johnson's Addition =

- Hamlet
- Location of Johnson's Addition Johnson's Addition (Canada)
- Coordinates: 49°46′54.40″N 112°10′30.40″W
- Country: Canada
- Province: Alberta
- Region: Southern Alberta
- Census division: 2
- Municipal district: Municipal District of Taber

Government
  - Type: Unincorporated
  - Governing body: Municipal District of Taber Council

Area (2021)
  - Land: 0.19 km^{2} (0.073 sq mi)

Population (2021)
  - Total: 126
  - Density: 670.9/km^{2} (1,738/sq mi)
- Time zone: UTC−06:00 (Alberta Time)
- Area codes: 403, 587, 825

Johnson's Addition is a hamlet in southern Alberta, Canada within the Municipal District of Taber. It is adjacent to the western boundary of the Town of Taber at the intersection of Highway 3 and Highway 864 (Range Road 170).

== Toponymy ==
The hamlet is named after Aaron Johnson, original owner of 40 acres that today fall under Johnson's Addition.

== History ==
In the early twentieth century, Utah-born Aaron Johnson purchased forty acres of land outside Taber, where he served as assistant postmaster. (He assumed the role of postmaster for a short time between June and September 1907.)

In 1907 he subdivided the land into smaller plots which he then named "Johnson's Addition." He began selling the lots to buyers in September of that year. Johnson placed advertisements in Taber's local newspaper aimed especially at workers employed by the nearby coal mine. The available lots were primarily for constructing residential properties, though some were suitable for farming.

Johnson's son, Frank, himself a miner, also worked as a courier for a butcher in the area. Many residents of Johnson's Addition owned dogs, which had a habit of chasing after Frank's wagon when he drove meat through the settlement. Frank nicknamed the area "Dog Town," which was also adopted by residents for a time.

In May 1923 farmers in Johnson's Addition agreed to cede land to the provincial government to extend the settlement's main road to the highway. This provided the Addition with better transport links to Taber.

Johnson's Addition was declared a hamlet by Marvin Moore, then-Minister of Municipal Affairs, on September 15, 1982.

== Demographics ==
Population history of Johnson's Addition
Year	Pop.	±%
1956	82	—
1961	101	+23.2%
1966	74	−26.7%
1971	94	+27.0%
1976	103	+9.6%
1981	99	−3.9%
1986	95	−4.0%
1991	105	+10.5%
1991A	127	+21.0%
1996	115	−9.4%
2001	143	+24.3%
2016R	130	−9.1%
2021	126	−3.1%
Source: Statistics Canada

In the 2021 Census of Population conducted by Statistics Canada, Johnson's Addition had a population of 126 living in 42 of its 42 total private dwellings, a change of −3.1% from its 2016 population of 130. With a land area of 0.19 km^{2} (0.073 sq mi), it had a population density of 663.2/km^{2} (1,717.6/sq mi) in 2021.

As a designated place in the 2016 Census of Population conducted by Statistics Canada, Johnson's Addition had a population of 34 living in 13 of its 14 total private dwellings, a change of 21.4% from its 2011 population of 28. With a land area of 0.41 km^{2} (0.16 sq mi), it had a population density of 82.9/km^{2} (214.8/sq mi) in 2016.

The Municipal District of Taber's 2016 municipal census counted a population of 130 in Johnson's Addition, a 13% change from the hamlet's 2013 municipal census population of 115.

== See also ==
- List of communities in Alberta
- List of designated places in Alberta
- List of hamlets in Alberta
