= Grassy Lake, Alberta =

Grassy Lake
- Hamlet
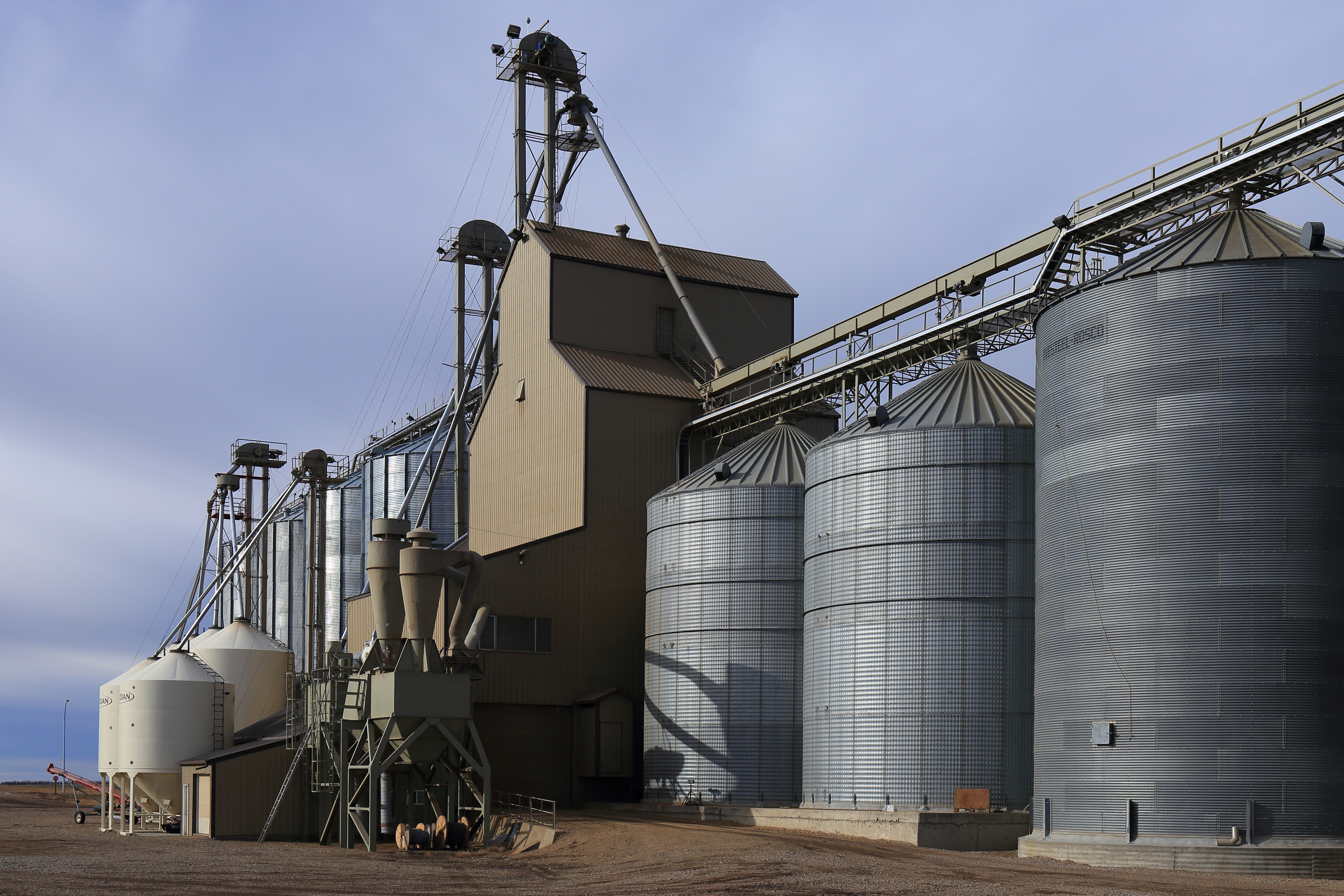

- Location of Grassy Lake in Alberta
- Coordinates: 49.8261°N 111.7000°W
- Country: Canada
- Province: Alberta
- Census division: No. 2
- Municipal district: Municipal District of Taber

Government
  - Type: Unincorporated
  - Governing body: Municipal District of Taber Council

Area (2021)
  - Land: 1.55 km^{2} (0.60 sq mi)
- Elevation: 810 m (2,660 ft)

Population (2021)
  - Total: 856
  - Density: 552.5/km^{2} (1,431/sq mi)
- Time zone: UTC−06:00 (Alberta Time)

Grassy Lake is a hamlet in Alberta, Canada within the Municipal District of Taber. It is located on the Crowsnest Highway (Highway 3), midway between the cities of Lethbridge to the west and Medicine Hat to the east. It is approximately 13 km (8.1 mi) west of Burdett and 34 km (21 mi) east of Taber. It has an elevation of 810 metres (2,660 ft). It was formerly incorporated as a village, dissolving into the Municipal District of Taber on July 1, 1996.

The hamlet is located in Census Division No. 2 and in the federal riding of Medicine Hat.

Grassy Lake was named for a nearby lake of the same name, which has since been drained.

== Demographics ==
In the 2021 Census of Population conducted by Statistics Canada, Grassy Lake had a population of 856 living in 199 of its 208 total private dwellings, a change of 7.1% from its 2016 population of 799. With a land area of 1.55 km^{2} (0.60 sq mi), it had a population density of 552.3/km^{2} (1,430.3/sq mi) in 2021.

As a designated place in the 2016 Census of Population conducted by Statistics Canada, Grassy Lake had a population of 799 living in 179 of its 187 total private dwellings, a change of 23.1% from its 2011 population of 649. With a land area of 1.55 km^{2} (0.60 sq mi), it had a population density of 515.5/km^{2} (1,335.1/sq mi) in 2016.

The Municipal District of Taber's 2016 municipal census counted a population of 815 in Grassy Lake, a 4.8% change from the hamlet's 2013 municipal census population of 778.

== See also ==
- List of communities in Alberta
- List of designated places in Alberta
- List of former urban municipalities in Alberta
- List of hamlets in Alberta
