= Fincastle, Alberta =

Coordinates: 49.8084781°N 112.0320097°W

Fincastle is a locality in Alberta, Canada. It is located east of Taber in the southeastern portion of the province.

The locality was named after the Viscount of Fincastle, a title related to the Earl of Dunmore.

The postal code of Fincastle is T0K 1X0, which belongs to the district of Purple Springs, AB.
