= 2013 census =

2013 census may refer to:

- 2013 Alberta municipal censuses
- 2013 population census in Bosnia and Herzegovina
- 2013 New Zealand census
