= Cranford, Alberta =

Locality in Alberta, Canada

Coordinates: 49°45′30″N 112°21′00″W

Location of Cranford Alberta

Cranford is an unincorporated locality in the Canadian province of Alberta, located in the Municipal District of Taber. It is situated on Highway 3, 34 kilometres (21 mi) east of Lethbridge.
