= Tabara =

Tabara may refer to:

== Places ==
- Tabăra (disambiguation), three places in Romania and Moldova
- Tábara, a town in Spain
- Tabara, Togo
- Tabara, Estonia, village in Estonia
- Tábara Arriba, municipality in the Dominican Republic
- Tábara Abajo, municipality in the Dominican Republic

== People with the surname ==
- Enrique Tábara (1930–2021), Latin American painter
- Michal Tabara (born 1979), Czech tennis player
- Naoya Tabara (田原 直哉; born 1980), Japanese artistic gymnast and freestyle skier
- Valeriu Tabără (1949–2025), Romanian agronomist and politician

== See also ==
- Tabora
