= Venice, Alberta =

Venice
- Hamlet
- Location of Venice Venice (Canada)
- Coordinates: 54°41′52″N 112°08′53″W
- Country: Canada
- Province: Alberta
- Region: Northern Alberta
- Census division: 12
- Specialized municipality: Lac La Biche County

Government
  - Type: Unincorporated
  - Governing body: Lac La Biche County Council

Population (2016)
  - Total: 22
- Time zone: UTC−06:00 (Alberta Time)
- Area codes: 780, 587, 825

Venice is a hamlet in northern Alberta, Canada within Lac La Biche County. It is located approximately 11 kilometres (6.8 mi) west of Highway 55 and 130 kilometres (81 mi) northwest of Cold Lake.

== Demographics ==
Lac La Biche County's 2016 municipal census counted a population of 22 in Venice.

== See also ==
- List of communities in Alberta
- List of hamlets in Alberta
