= Tabeer =

Tabeer may refer to:

- Tabeer (album), a 2008 album by Shafqat Amanat Ali
- Tabeer (TV series), a 2018 Pakistani drama series

== See also ==
- Tabir (disambiguation)
