= Purple Springs =

- Hamlet
- Location of Purple Springs in Alberta
- Coordinates: 49.8156°N 111.8925°W
- Country: Canada
- Province: Alberta
- Census division: No. 2
- Municipal district: Municipal District of Taber

Government
  - Type: Unincorporated
  - Governing body: Municipal District of Taber Council

Area (2021)
  - Land: 0.65 km^{2} (0.25 sq mi)

Population (2021)
  - Total: 101
  - Density: 156/km^{2} (400/sq mi)
- Time zone: UTC−06:00 (Alberta Time)

Purple Springs is a hamlet in southern Alberta, Canada within the Municipal District of Taber. It is located on Highway 3, approximately 17 kilometres (11 mi) east of Taber.

== History ==
The Government of Alberta established the Purple Springs Grazing Reserve in 1957 that is located 0.8 km away from the community. The reserve is 6,684 acres (27.05 km^{2}) and was the first irrigated grazing reserve in the province.

== Demographics ==
In the 2021 Census of Population conducted by Statistics Canada, Purple Springs had a population of 101 living in 21 of its 21 total private dwellings, a change of 129.5% from its 2016 population of 44. With a land area of 0.65 km^{2} (0.25 sq mi), it had a population density of 155.4/km^{2} (402.4/sq mi) in 2021.

As a designated place in the 2016 Census of Population conducted by Statistics Canada, Purple Springs had a population of 29 living in 7 of its 7 total private dwellings, a change of 26.1% from its 2011 population of 23. With a land area of 0.29 km^{2} (0.11 sq mi), it had a population density of 100.0/km^{2} (259.0/sq mi) in 2016.

The Municipal District of Taber's 2016 municipal census counted a population of 44 in Purple Springs, a 7.3% change from the hamlet's 2013 municipal census population of 41.

== See also ==
- List of communities in Alberta
- List of hamlets in Alberta
