= Sharon Kinne =

American woman convicted of two murders

- Undated photo of Sharon Kinne, a.k.a. "Diedra Glabus"
- Born: Sharon Elizabeth Hall; November 30, 1939; Independence, Missouri, U.S.
- Died: January 21, 2022 (aged 82); Taber, Alberta, Canada
- Other names: Jeanette Pugliese, La Pistolera, Diedra Grace (Dee) Glabus/Ell
- Spouses: James Kinne (1956–1960; his murder); Jim Glabus (1970–1979; his death); Willie Ell (1982–2011; his death)
- Children: 4
- Convictions: Murder (James Kinne) (overturned, charges dismissed after her death); Homicide (Francisco Parades Ordoñez)
- Criminal charges: Murder (James Kinne); Murder (Patricia Jones); Homicide (Francisco Paredes Ordoñez)
- Penalty: Life imprisonment (James Kinne); 13 years imprisonment (Francisco Parades Ordoñez)
- Escaped: December 7, 1969; 56 years ago

Sharon Kinne (born Sharon Elizabeth Hall; November 30, 1939 – January 21, 2022), also known as Jeanette Pugliese and La Pistolera in Mexico, and Diedra Grace "Dee" Glabus (later Diedra Ell) in Canada, was an American murderer, suspected serial killer and prison escapee who was convicted in Mexico for one murder and is suspected of two others in the United States, one of which she was acquitted of at trial, during the 1960s. She was the subject of the longest outstanding arrest warrant for murder in the history of Kansas City, Missouri, and one of the longest outstanding felony warrants in U.S. history. In January 2025, it was announced that Kinne had lived in the small Canadian town of Taber, Alberta, from approximately 1973 until her death in 2022.

On March 19, 1960, Sharon's husband, James Kinne, was found shot in the head inside the home they shared in Independence, Missouri. Sharon claimed that the couple's two-year-old daughter, who had often been allowed to play with James' firearms, had accidentally shot him, and police were initially unable to disprove her story. Then, on May 27, the body of 23-year-old Patricia Jones, a local file clerk, was found by Sharon and a boyfriend in a secluded area. Investigators found that Jones had been the wife of another of Sharon's boyfriends, who had tried to break off their affair shortly before Jones disappeared. When Sharon admitted to having been the last person to speak with Jones, she was charged with her murder and, upon further investigation of his death, that of James.

Sharon went to trial for Jones' murder in June 1961 and was acquitted. A January 1962 trial on charges of murdering James ended in conviction and a sentence of life imprisonment, but the verdict was overturned because of procedural irregularities. The case went to a second trial, which ended within days in a mistrial. A third trial ended in a hung jury in July 1964. Sharon was released on bond following the third trial and subsequently traveled to Mexico before a scheduled fourth trial could be held in October 1964.

In Mexico, Sharon killed Mexican-born American citizen Francisco Paredes Ordoñez. She claimed self-defense after an unwanted sexual advance. However, he was shot in the back and investigations showed Ordoñez was shot with the same weapon that killed Jones. Sharon was convicted in October 1965 of the Ordoñez killing and sentenced to ten years in prison, later lengthened to thirteen years after judicial review. She escaped from prison in Iztapalapa during a power outage in December 1969.

Sharon's whereabouts remained unknown for over fifty years. In January 2025, U.S. authorities confirmed she had taken the name “Diedra Glabus" and lived in Canada between 1973 and her death in 2022, at age 82. While Sharon's case is officially closed, authorities still seek information about her movements after 1969.

== Early life and marriage ==
South Main Street in Independence, Missouri, Kinne's hometown.

Sharon Kinne was born Sharon Elizabeth Hall on November 30, 1939, in Independence, Missouri, a suburb of Kansas City. Her parents, Eugene and Doris Hall, were devout members of the Reorganized Church of Jesus Christ of Latter-day Saints (now known as the Community of Christ), a denomination in the Latter-day Saint movement. When she was in junior high school, Sharon's parents relocated the family to Washington State, but by the time she was aged 15 they had returned to Missouri. In the summer of 1956, at age 16, Sharon met James Kinne, a 22-year-old student at Brigham Young University (BYU), while attending a church function. The couple dated regularly until James returned to BYU that fall.

Sharon, who was reportedly searching for a partner with prospects who could take her away from Independence, wrote a letter to James claiming that she was pregnant by him. James took leave from BYU and returned to Independence, where he married Sharon on October 18, 1956. The couple's marriage license falsely identified Sharon as being eighteen years old and a widow; though she later refused to address the assertion, Sharon told people at the time that she had been married when she lived in Washington State, to a man who later died in a car accident. The new couple held a second, more formal wedding the following year at the Salt Lake Temple in Salt Lake City, Utah, after Sharon had completed the process of joining the Church of Jesus Christ of Latter-day Saints.

After their wedding, the Kinnes returned to Provo, Utah. James resumed his studies at BYU but put them on hold again at the end of 1956's fall semester. The couple returned to Independence, where both partners took jobs—Sharon babysat and tended shops, while James worked as an electrical engineer at Bendix Aviation. Although Sharon claimed to have miscarried the child that had brought about their marriage, she soon became pregnant again. In the fall of 1957, she gave birth to a girl the couple named Danna.

Sharon was reportedly a lavish spender who expected finer things out of life, but on James' salary they lived first in a rented home next to his parents' residence, then in a ranch-style house they had built at 17009 East 26th Terrace, Independence. James worked the night shift at Bendix, and Sharon filled her days with shopping and, later, with other men. By the time the couple had a second child, a boy named Troy, Sharon was carrying on a regular extramarital affair with a friend from high school, John Boldizs. (Note: Boldizs' name is spelled differently in sources, sometimes as "Boldwizs", and sometimes as "Boldizs",)

By early 1960, James was contemplating divorce, partially because of Sharon's spending habits and partially because he strongly suspected her infidelity. He spoke to his parents about the possibility of divorce the day before his death, telling them that Sharon had agreed to give him one if he allowed her to keep the house, gave her custody of the couple's daughter and paid her US$1,000 in alimony. James' parents, devout Mormons, urged him to stay in the marriage. Sharon, too, was thinking about ways out of the marriage; according to Boldizs, she once offered him US$1,000 to kill her husband, or find someone who would, although he later claimed that she may have been joking.

== 1960 deaths ==
=== James Kinne ===
James Kinne

According to Sharon, on March 19, 1960, at around 5:30 p.m., she heard a gunshot from the direction of the bedroom in which James was sleeping. Entering the room, she found two-and-a-half-year-old Danna on the bed next to her father, holding one of his firearms, a High Standard .22 Pistol; James was bleeding from an apparent gunshot wound in the back of his head. Sharon called police, but James was dead by the time the ambulance carrying him arrived at the hospital.

Police were unable to recover any fingerprints from the well-oiled grip of the pistol, and a paraffin test for gunshot residue was not performed on either Danna or Sharon. Multiple people, including family and neighbors, told police that James had often allowed Danna to play with his guns, and in a test by investigating officers, Danna proved able to pull the trigger on a gun matching the one that had killed her father. With no evidence to the contrary, investigators ruled the case an accidental homicide.

The pistol that killed James was taken into police custody and never returned to Sharon, despite her efforts to reclaim it; she later had a male friend secretly buy her a .22 caliber automatic pistol. When the friend told Sharon that he had registered the gun in her name, she requested that he re-register it under a name other than hers.

With the investigation into his death closed, James was buried and Sharon collected on his life insurance policies, valued at about US$29,000 (US$230,000 in present day).

=== Patricia Jones ===
Patricia Jones, born Patricia Clements, was one of six children born to Mr. and Mrs. Elmer Clements of St. Joseph, Missouri. After graduating from Benton High School, she married Walter T. Jones Jr., her high school sweetheart. Walter enlisted in the United States Marine Corps shortly after their wedding, and the couple relocated to the West Coast during his service. After Walter received his discharge, the couple returned to Missouri and settled in Independence with their two children. By 1960, almost five years into the marriage, Jones was working as a file clerk for the Internal Revenue Service while her husband was a car salesman.

Despite his marriage and children, Walter reportedly had a wandering eye. On April 18, Walter met Sharon when she bought a Ford Thunderbird from his dealership using some of the insurance payout from her husband's death. The two began an affair shortly thereafter. Sharon viewed Walter as a prospect for a second husband, but he was uninterested in leaving Patricia despite difficulties in their marriage. When he declined to join her on a trip to Washington State in May, Sharon reluctantly went with her brother Eugene instead. Although they reunited on May 25, the relationship became fraught when Sharon told Walter that she was pregnant with his child. Instead of responding with what Sharon expected to be an agreement to divorce Patricia, Walter ended the affair.

According to her later testimony, on the afternoon of May 26, Sharon contacted Patricia at her office and told her that Walter was having an affair with Sharon's sister. Sharon then met with Patricia that evening to discuss the matter further before dropping her off near the Jones residence.

After Patricia failed to return home that evening, Walter filed a missing persons report with police the next day and began calling people he thought might have seen his wife. He got a lead when he spoke to friends of Patricia's who carpooled to work with her. They told him that Patricia had reported receiving a phone call that day from an unnamed woman who wanted to meet with her. Patricia had asked the carpool driver to drop her off at a street corner in downtown Independence, which he had done. The occupants of the carpool had seen a woman waiting for Patricia in another car but did not recognize her. They nevertheless provided a description of the unknown woman to Walter.

Suspicious of the identity of the woman based on the carpoolers' general description, Walter called Sharon and asked if she had seen or spoken to his wife. Sharon allowed that she had, indeed, seen Patricia that day; she had met her to tell her about Walter's affair. According to Sharon, she last saw Patricia where she dropped her off near the Jones residence, speaking to an unknown man in a green 1957 Ford.

Based on her admission over the phone, Walter met with Sharon late Friday evening and insisted she give him more details about his wife's whereabouts; he later admitted to going so far as to hold a key to her throat threateningly. Sharon's response was, after leaving Walter, to call Boldizs and ask him to help her search for Patricia. Shortly before midnight, within hours of her conversation with Walter, Sharon and Boldizs discovered the body of a woman in a secluded area (Note: The area Jones' body was found is variously described as a "quarry lane," a "wooded area" and a "lovers' lane.") approximately one mile outside of Independence. According to Boldizs, he had been the one to suggest searching the area in which they encountered the body; it was a spot to which they had often gone on dates before.

The body, dressed in a black sweater and yellow skirt, was soon identified as Patricia's. She had been shot four times by a .22 caliber pistol. Although the fatal wound was a shot to her head, entering near her mouth on an upward trajectory, she also had one through-and-through bullet wound to her abdomen and two penetrating gunshot wounds to her shoulders on a downward trajectory through her body. Powder burns on the hemline of her skirt, which had been raised to her waist, indicated that the gun had been fired from close range at least once. Initial reports and investigation placed Patricia's time of death at approximately 9 p.m. on May 27. She was buried on May 31.

=== Arrest and investigation ===
Sharon Kinne mugshot after her arrest for the killing of James Kinne, June 1960

Investigators immediately began to question Sharon, Walter and Boldizs. All three were questioned on May 28. Walter and Boldizs both gave written statements admitting that they had dated Sharon, and both agreed to lie detector tests; Sharon gave an oral statement to police but declined to sign a written one or take a lie detector test. She was questioned again on the morning of May 30, and Boldizs on May 31. The scheduled lie detector tests for the two men were performed on June 1, and both men were deemed to have been truthful in their statements. Sharon's brother Eugene was also interviewed on May 31, but declined to answer questions.

While police questioned potential suspects and witnesses, other investigators focused on processing the crime scene. Repeated attempts were made to find the murder weapon and the bullet that had passed through Patricia's body, including the sifting of dirt at the crime scene and the deployment of a troop of Boy Scouts. A .22 caliber rifle slug was eventually found buried in the ground where Patricia's body had been found, providing evidence that at least some of her wounds had been sustained at the crime scene. Although investigators went so far as to drag the bottom of nearby bodies of water, the gun that had shot Patricia—assumed to be a .22 caliber pistol—could not be located.

Buildings near the crime scene were also searched for blood and gunshot evidence, in accordance with police's theory that Patricia had been attacked elsewhere and then transported outdoors. A "white, powdery substance" found in her hair was initially believed to be trace evidence of some other crime scene area—an idea that fueled the search of nearby buildings—but was later determined to be fly eggs.

Sharon was arrested at her home for the murder of Patricia Jones around 11 p.m. on May 31, the same night as Patricia's funeral. The same day, the Jackson County sheriff requested that prosecutors consider a second charge of murder, this one for the death of James Kinne. Sharon's lawyers, Alex Peebles and Martha Sperry Hickman, filed a writ of habeas corpus with the court the following morning, and a hearing that afternoon resulted in her release on US$20,000 bond while she awaited a preliminary hearing originally scheduled for June 16.

Police were able to rule out the .22 caliber pistol that had killed James as the murder weapon in Patricia's death; that gun was still in the possession of the sheriff's office. However, a man who worked with Sharon admitted to having secretly purchased a new .22 caliber pistol at her request in the beginning of May. Police were unable to locate the gun in question when they searched her house, though they did find an empty box that they believed had once held a gun. Sharon at first claimed to investigators that she had lost the gun on a trip to Washington State, then stated simply that the gun had disappeared. Walter was taken into custody on June 2 as a material witness to the case and was freed the same day on US$2,000 bond.

The initial autopsy performed on Patricia was criticized by police and prosecutors, who felt that the recovery of bullets and a testing of stomach contents should have been done. Dr. Hugh Owens, who had performed the autopsy, argued that he had recovered one of the presumed three bullets present in the body, and that because the body had been "prepared" by an undertaker prior to autopsy, any chemical tests on stomach contents would have been useless. Owens did add when asked that he had not seen any food apparent in the stomach at autopsy. Patricia's body was exhumed on June 17 in order to collect the bullets that had been left behind at the original autopsy, as well as to gather what samples of tissue and stomach contents were possible.

Sharon's arraignment on July 11 resulted in denial of bail, but the Missouri Court of Appeals struck down the ruling days later based on the prosecution's reliance on circumstantial evidence. She was freed on US$24,000 (worth US$188,976 in 2013 dollars) bond on July 18. After a delay in her trial date due to her advanced pregnancy, Sharon gave birth to a daughter she named Marla Christine on January 16, 1961.

== Trials for 1960 murders ==
=== Trial in the death of Patricia Jones (1961) ===
Kinne signs an autograph for juror Ogden Stephens following her acquittal, 1961

Although charged with both murders, Sharon was tried separately for the two crimes. Her trial for the murder of Patricia Jones began in mid-June 1961, with jury selection beginning on or about June 13 and the trial commencing days later with an all-male jury.

Opening arguments by both prosecution and defense set up cases based on purported times of death. Basing their assertion on pathologist-given testimony that Patricia had died about six hours after she ate lunch on May 26, the prosecution claimed that Jones had died more than 24 hours before Sharon and Boldizs found her body; defense attorneys argued that death had more likely occurred six to eight hours prior. Prosecutor J. Arnott Hill cited testimony by Walter Jones and Chief of Detectives Lt. Harry Nesbitt as evidence of Sharon's motive for the crime: Nesbitt recalled statements by Sharon that she was afraid Walter was drifting away from her (Note: "I was afraid I was losing him – he acted funny", Nesbitt quotes Sharon as saying.) despite the financial support she offered him, and Walter testified that Sharon had told him she was pregnant by him and he had thereafter attempted to end the relationship.

The prosecution was unable to firmly establish that Sharon owned or had once had the weapon that killed Patricia, though both Sharon's known pistol and the one that fired the bullets that killed Patricia were .22 caliber weapons. Roy Thrush, the man who sold the pistol to Sharon's male friend, had led police to a tree that contained what he claimed to be bullets he had fired from that pistol; however, when the bullets were extracted from the tree trunk, tests showed that the extracted bullets were not identifiable as having come from the weapon that killed Patricia.

The prosecution rested its case on June 21 after calling 27 witnesses. Sharon's defense, which took less than two days and involved fourteen witnesses other than Sharon—who did not testify—focused on breaking down the State's claims of motive and means, arguing that she had no reason to kill Patricia and that the pistol she was alleged to have owned had not been proven to be the murder weapon.

After slightly over one and a half hours of deliberation, (Note: 1 hour 38 minutes, according to the Evening Independent; one hour 35 minutes according to the Reading Eagle.) the jury, citing "just too many loopholes" left in the prosecution's case, acquitted Sharon Kinne. Immediately after the delivery of the verdict, juror Ogden Stephens asked Sharon for her autograph, which she was photographed giving to him. Sharon was returned to jail the same day to await trial for the murder of her husband.

=== First trial in the death of James Kinne (1962) ===
Despite her acquittal for the murder of Patricia Jones, Sharon remained charged for the murder of her husband, James Kinne. When jury selection began on January 8, 1962, Hill announced that he did not intend to pursue the death penalty in the case.

The prosecution's case rested largely on their contention that Sharon had been so interested in seeing her husband removed that she had been willing to pay for his murder, supported by the grand jury testimony of Boldizs. Boldizs, though nominally a witness for the prosecution, weakened his testimony on the stand during the trial by claiming that Sharon's offer to pay him US$1,000 in return for James's murder could have been a joke, and Hill was forced to attack his own witness's credibility. Further prosecution testimony alleged that the Kinnes' marriage had been on the verge of dissolution at the time of James's death, that Sharon's adultery had been a cause of this, and that Sharon had known that she would collect her husband's US$29,000 in life insurance policies only if she were still his wife.

The defense, led by attorneys Hickman and James Patrick Quinn, focused on the circumstantial quality of the prosecution's evidence, noting that prior police investigation had determined James's death to be "obviously accidental" and that the jury was obligated to assume innocence on the defendant's part no matter how unpleasant they found her moral character to be. The defense, too, attacked the reliability of Boldizs' testimony, calling him a "poor, mixed-up kid" who would "sign anything." Kinne's attorneys also presented testimony from witnesses supporting the viability of the theory that Danna had shot her father, including statements that guns had been regularly left within her reach at the family home, that she was able to pull the triggers on toy guns with stiffer trigger pulls than the weapon that caused James' death and that she had often been observed pretending to fire guns in play.

The trial ended in conviction on January 11 after five and a half hours of deliberation. In April of the same year, Sharon was formally sentenced to life in prison. She began to serve her sentence in the Missouri Reformatory for Women.

Later interviews with jurors from the trial revealed that "three or four ballots" had been taken before the "guilty" verdict was reached, beginning with the jury solidly divided and moving progressively toward unanimity for conviction. One juror told the Kansas City Star that Sharon's morals had not been considered at issue by the jury, and that she thought no juror had been aware of her previously being tried for the murder of Patricia Jones. Despite the verdict, James's family continued to believe the best of their daughter-in-law, telling reporters on the day of the verdict, "[W]e can't find it in our hearts to say anything bad about her" and, "We still don't feel that she committed murder." Sharon herself told reporters that she felt the verdict was a mistake, and that she regretted her previous enthusiasm for having a woman on the jury.

The following week, Sharon's lawyers requested that she be released on bond, supported by a community petition signed by 132 supporters of her innocence. The motion was denied on the basis of first-degree murder not being a bailable offense; presiding judge Tom J. Stubbs also counseled Sharon's lawyers that he felt their involvement in such a petition at a time when a motion for bond was being considered was "highly improper." A subsequent defense motion requested that the conviction be vacated because the jury had delivered its verdict based on "surmise and speculation" rather than "substantial evidence," listing a series of procedural errors that Sharon's counsel alleged had taken place before and during the trial; these included a juror taking "incomplete" notes, disputes over Boldizs' testimony and an incorrect number of potential jurors being provided for selection.

The motion was denied by Judge Stubbs in April 1962, but appealed to the Missouri Supreme Court, which in March 1963 reversed the conviction and ordered a new trial on the basis of Sharon's defense having been denied adequate peremptory challenges during jury selection in her trial. Sharon was denied an opportunity for bail in May 1963, but that ruling was overturned in July and she was released on $25,000 bond, posted by her brother Eugene.

The State's request that the Missouri Supreme Court re-consider its position on Sharon's conviction was granted, but in October 1963 that hearing resulted in further grounds being found for a new trial, this time on the basis of the prosecutor having been allowed to cross-examine a prosecution witness. A second request for a re-hearing on the validity of the conviction was denied by the Missouri Supreme Court. Sharon and her children moved in with her mother and awaited the start of her new trial.

=== Second trial in the death of James Kinne (1964) ===
Sharon's second trial for the death of James Kinne began on March 23, 1964. As jury selection got underway that day, the public was initially barred from the proceedings, but the restriction was soon loosened and journalists were allowed into the courtroom. An unusually long jury selection process made the first day of the trial last fourteen hours, beginning at 9 a.m. and not ending until nearly midnight; presiding judge Paul Carver noted that due to the notoriety of the case, he had been forced to choose between sequestering the entire jury pool overnight or forcing the court into a long day. The eventual jury, all men, were immediately sequestered, but days later, a mistrial was declared after it emerged that a law partner of prosecutor Lawrence Gepford had once been retained by one of the jurors.

=== Third trial in the death of James Kinne (1964) ===
Sharon's third trial, originally scheduled to begin early in June 1964, began instead on June 29. Assistant prosecutor Donald L. Mason declared at jury selection that he intended to death-qualify the jury, a process in which a prosecutor peremptorily challenges any juror who automatically opposes the death penalty, and jury selection once again took more than twelve hours in one day. Boldizs' testimony in this trial remained contradictory as to whether he believed Sharon's US$1,000 offer to have James killed had been intended seriously, but he added this time that after his death, Sharon had asked that Boldizs not tell authorities about her offer.

A new witness, a female acquaintance of Sharon's, testified that she had once joked that the woman should "get rid of [the woman's] old man like [Sharon] did," but defense cross-examination highlighted inconsistencies between this testimony and a similar quote the woman had offered at a previous deposition. For the first time at any of her trials, Sharon took the stand on the last day of this trial to issue a categorical denial of all charges. The all-male jury deadlocked seven-to-five in favor of acquittal in this trial, resulting in a second mistrial.

== Killing of Francisco Paredes Ordoñez ==
Sharon Kinne mugshot after her arrest for the killing of Francisco Ordoñez, September 1964

A fourth trial was scheduled for October 1964; however, in September, Sharon, still free on her $25,000 bond, traveled to Mexico with an alleged lover, Francis Samuel Pugliese, (Note: Spelled in various sources as "Pugliese", "Puglishe", "Puglise", and "Publicet".) leaving her children with James's father and traveling as Pugliese's wife under the name "Jeanette Pugliese." (Note: Or "Puglise", or "Puglishe", or "Publicet", as per previous note.) The couple later said that they had gone to Mexico to get married. Under the legal terms of her bail, Sharon was permitted to leave the country, but her contract with the company that posted her bond prohibited her from leaving Missouri without written permission from the company's agents.

After crossing the border, Sharon and Pugliese registered at a local hotel, Hotel Gin, again as husband and wife. Sharon, saying that she felt unsafe in the foreign country, bought a pistol—which meant that the couple now possessed multiple guns, having brought one or two with them from the U.S.

On the night of September 18, Sharon left the hotel without Pugliese, either to acquire money because the couple was running low or to get medicine she required. She encountered Francisco Paredes Ordoñez, a Mexican-born American citizen, at a bar and accompanied him back to his room in Hotel La Vada. According to her account, Sharon went with Ordoñez to see photographs he offered to show her, but he soon began to make sexual advances toward her and she was forced to fire her gun at him in an attempt to protect herself.

Sharon maintained later that she had had no intention of harming or killing Ordoñez, and had intended only to frighten him, but her bullets struck him in the chest and killed him. Responding to the sound of gunfire, hotel employee Enrique Martinez Rueda entered the room. Sharon fired again and hit Rueda in the shoulder. Wounded, Rueda fled the room, locking Sharon inside, and called the police.

Police, rejecting Sharon's story, theorized that she had gone out that evening intending robbery, and had chosen Ordoñez as her victim. When he resisted her orders to give her his money, police believed, Sharon had shot him.

=== Arrest, investigation, and trial ===
Police responding to Hotel La Vada arrested Sharon on charges of homicide and assault with a deadly weapon. She maintained that she had not intended to harm Ordoñez, and that she had fired her weapon at Rueda because she feared that he, too, was coming to attack her. Police searched her purse, finding a gun and fifty cartridges, and then the couple's room at Hotel Gin, where they found two more guns and another supply of cartridges.

Authorities took Pugliese into custody at the Hotel Gin, initially holding him without charge and later filing charges of entering the country illegally and carrying an unlicensed gun. The gun found in the couple's room that night was later proven through ballistics to be the same gun that killed Patricia Jones in 1960, but because Sharon had already been acquitted of that crime, she could not be charged again for it based on the new evidence.

Pugliese was held at the Palacio de Lecumberri in Mexico City, while Sharon was initially placed in a women's prison before being transferred to Lecumberri for her trial. The couple were arraigned on September 26 and held for trial. In October, Sharon's Mexican attorney, Higinio Lara, filed a recurso de amparo, similar to a writ of habeas corpus, asserting that the Mexican government was violating her constitutional rights by holding her for a shooting committed in self-defense. The request was denied and both Sharon and Pugliese were tried in the summer of 1965.

Pugliese, cleared of the charges against him, was deported to the U.S., but Sharon was convicted on October 18 of the homicide of Ordoñez. Despite rumors that she would receive probation and be deported like Pugliese, she was instead sentenced to a ten-year prison term for the murder. When she was officially notified of the sentence the next day, she asserted that she would appeal her conviction. The appeal, rather than overturning her sentence, lengthened it. The three-man superior court that heard the case overturned one aspect of her conviction—charges of attempted robbery—but upheld her murder conviction and increased her sentence to thirteen years, saying that her original sentence of ten years had been too lenient.

Sharon was returned to the women's prison to serve her sentence. There, she was nicknamed "La Pistolera" ("the gunfighter"), a nickname subsequently adopted by the Mexican press.

=== Escape ===
On December 7, 1969, Sharon was not present for a routine 5 p.m. roll-call at the Iztapalapan prison where she was serving her sentence. Her absence was not officially noted until she also failed to show up at a second roll-call later that evening. The news of her escape was not reported to Mexico City police until 2 p.m. the following morning. A manhunt was then organized, initially focusing on the northern Mexican states due to authorities' belief that Sharon may have been heading for the last known whereabouts of a former inmate to whom she had grown close while they were in prison together.

The search also encompassed country-wide transport hubs and eventually circled back to the Mexico City area. U.S. authorities, including the Federal Bureau of Investigation (FBI), were also alerted of Mexican authorities' belief that Sharon may have been attempting to work her way back into her native country, but the FBI noted that it was unlikely to have jurisdiction in the case.

Initial police speculation was that Sharon had bribed guards to look the other way while she escaped the prison—an unusual blackout had been reported at the prison on the evening of and at the approximate time of her escape. Investigation showed that a door that should have been locked had been left unsecured. Further questioning of prison guards and administration showed that oversight at the prison was generally lax and that it was staffed by fewer guards than it should have been.

News reports of the time reported numerous theories about Sharon's escape, including that she had bribed prison guards, that she may have enlisted the help of a supposed boyfriend who was a Mexico City policeman, that her mother had been involved in the escape plan, that a former Mexican secret service agent had assisted in the escape and that Sharon may have disguised herself as a man to effect her escape. A more recent theory incorrectly speculated that Ordoñez's family had helped her escape and then killed her.

The intensive manhunt for Sharon was short-lived. By December 18, the Mexican secret service and the Mexico City district attorney's office were both reporting that they were no longer involved in searching for the escaped prisoner, while the federal district attorney was reporting that responsibility for the hunt belonged to the city district attorney's office. Investigators speculated that Sharon had already fled to Guatemala, mooting the purpose of a Mexican manhunt. They noted that she was fluent in Spanish after her years in Mexican prison, and she could therefore "get along rather well" in nearly any Spanish-speaking area of the world. Despite vowing to keep the case open and their investigation running until Sharon was back in custody, authorities were forced to admit by the end of December 1969 that they had run out of investigative leads to pursue.

== Fugitive from justice ==
Sharon's arrest and conviction in Mexico had implications for the status of her Missouri legal entanglements. Because she was being held in Mexico on October 26, 1964—the scheduled date for her fourth trial in the murder of her husband—her US$25,000 bond was revoked on that date. Although the United Bond Insurance Company, which had posted the bond, argued that paperwork irregularities rendered the issuance of her bail illegal, the court ordered the company to forfeit the bond. Sharon was reportedly concerned about the monetary implications of this forfeiture: "I could always use the money"; the Altus, Oklahoma, Times-Democrat quoted her as saying: "I don't intend to spend all my life in jail."

A US$30,000 supersedeas bond was issued in August 1965 as the United Bond Insurance Company continued to dispute the payment of Sharon's original US$25,000 bond. The supersedeas bond allowed the company to defer payment of the US$25,000 bond until a ruling on the matter was handed down by the Missouri Supreme Court, but when that court upheld the bond's forfeiture, the US$25,000 was paid to the State of Missouri in October 1965. The United Bond Insurance Company later filed suit against Sharon's family to recover the cost of the bail, lawyer's fees and manhunt for Sharon after her escape.

Shortly before her scheduled Missouri trial date, Sharon's Missouri counsel filed a motion to change the venue of any eventual fourth trial in the death of her husband, claiming that news coverage of the case had so prejudiced residents of Jackson County against Sharon that it would be impossible for her to get a fair trial there.

When Sharon failed to appear for the fourth trial, a warrant was issued for her arrest in October 1964. It was still outstanding at the time of her death, making it the oldest outstanding murder warrant known to exist in the Kansas City area. Sharon's status in the Mexican system also remained outstanding, though authorities pointed out that at the time of her escape, jailbreak was not a crime under Mexican law; if she were re-captured there, she would have only had to serve out the remainder of her outstanding sentence.

== Posthumous discovery ==
Kinne as "Diedra Glabus," date unknown

In December 2023, the Jackson County Sheriff's Office and the Kansas City Police Department both received an anonymous tip that Sharon had been living in the town of Taber, Alberta, Canada, approximately 121 miles (195 km) southeast of Calgary, under the alias of "Diedra Glabus," nicknamed "Dee."

Under Canadian law, law enforcement agencies are allowed to obtain fingerprints from deceased persons with criminal records. However, because "Diedra" had no such record, Canadian police were unable to do so. However, the local funeral home which had handled her remains provided a service preserving fingerprints as mementos for loved ones, which were processed through a company coincidentally based in Independence, Missouri—the very jurisdiction where Sharon's criminal warrants remained in effect. Jackson County investigators subsequently secured a warrant to obtain "Diedra's" fingerprints, which were conclusively matched to Sharon's by the FBI. U.S. authorities publicly announced these findings on January 17, 2025.

=== Life in Canada ===
Sharon married her second husband, James Thomas Glabus, in Los Angeles, California, in February 1970, two months after her jailbreak in Mexico. The couple relocated to Taber in 1973, where they operated a motel and, later, a real estate agency; advertisements for the latter business showing Sharon's picture were printed in local newspapers. Despite her fugitive status, the details of how Sharon obtained legal documentation such as a travel visa, identification and citizenship remains unknown.

On August 11, 1979, at age 38, Glabus died from complications related to diabetes and alcoholism. Sharon was left out of his will, an omission she fought in court. She later married her third husband, William "Willie" Ell, in March 1982. Ell died in on April 7, 2011, at age 79. Sharon herself died of coronary artery disease on January 21, 2022, at age 82, with Alzheimer's disease being listed as a contributing factor on her death certificate. Both her death certificate and her headstone falsely record 1940 as her year of birth. Sharon left behind one son from her marriage to Glabus in addition to her three children in the U.S.

Details about Sharon's movements after her prison escape remain largely unknown. In Taber, she performed volunteer work, including serving as chairwoman for a daycare center steering committee, and was known for needlepoint artistry, making banana bread and playing bridge. Although Sharon's death officially concluded her case, authorities were still seeking information about her life after 1969 as of 2025.

== Psychology and motivation ==
In a segment of the Investigation Discovery series Deadly Women covering the case, author James Hays speculated that Sharon committed her first murder for monetary gain, hoping to cash in on James's life insurance policy, and that she began to derive pleasure from killing at that point. Former FBI profiler Candice DeLong supported this assertion, stating that Sharon was a sociopath, lacking in remorse and empathy, and therefore had no compunction about killing to get what she wanted.

This idea was echoed by some of those involved in prosecuting Sharon. Even those who believed in her guilt, however, said that she had a certain appeal, describing her as "rather attractive" and admitting that they grew to like her. The Mammoth Book of True Crime describes her as a relative rarity, a "pretty" criminal.

In I'm Just an Ordinary Girl: The Sharon Kinne Story, Hays asserts that Sharon was inspired to kill her husband by a magazine article she read about Lillian Chastain, a Virginia woman who shot her husband during an argument and blamed the gunshot on the couple's two-year-old daughter. Charges against Chastain were filed in February 1960, weeks before James's death.

== See also ==
- List of fugitives from justice who disappeared

General:

- List of serial killers in the United States

== Bibliography ==
- Hays, James C. (1997). "I'm just an Ordinary Girl": The Sharon Kinne Story. Leathers Publishing. ISBN 1890622109.
- All cited articles from the Kansas City Star and the Kansas City Times were accessed via The Sharon Kinne Murder Case, a special collection of the Kansas City Public Library
