= Vauxhall, Alberta =

Vauxhall
- Town
- Town of Vauxhall
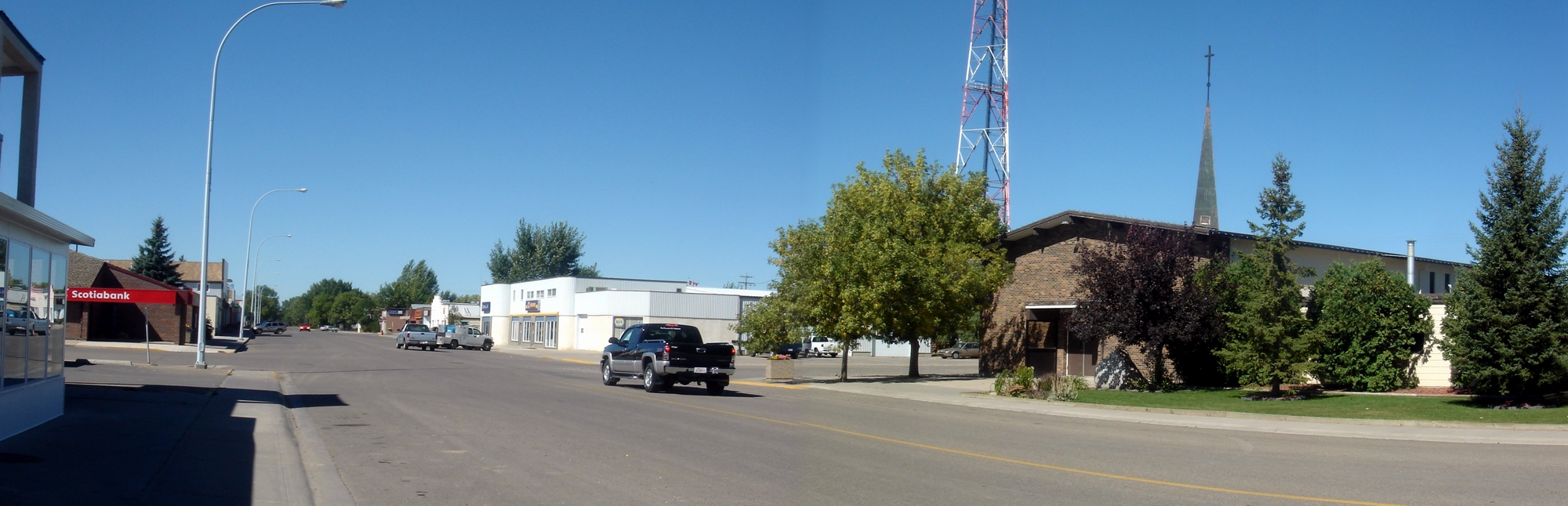
- Main Street in Vauxhall
- Motto: Potato Capital of the West
- Location of Vauxhall in Alberta
- Coordinates: 50°04′08″N 112°05′51″W
- Country: Canada
- Province: Alberta
- Region: Southern Alberta
- Census division: 2
- Municipal district: Municipal District of Taber
- Incorporated
  - Village: December 31, 1949
  - Town: January 1, 1961

Government
  - Mayor: Kimberly Cawley
  - Governing body: Vauxhall Town Council

Area (2021)
  - Land: 2.71 km^{2} (1.05 sq mi)
- Elevation: 779 m (2,556 ft)

Population (2021)
  - Total: 1,286
  - Density: 474.7/km^{2} (1,229/sq mi)
- Time zone: UTC−06:00 (Alberta Time)
- Highways: Highway 36; Highway 864
- Website: Official website

Vauxhall is a town in southern Alberta, Canada that is surrounded by the Municipal District of Taber. It is on Highway 36 (Veteran Memorial Highway) approximately 36 km (22 mi) north of Taber, 69 km (43 mi) south of Brooks and 114 km (71 mi) west of Medicine Hat. It is situated in the prairie land between Bow River and Oldman River.

Vauxhall is known as the "Potato Capital of the West."

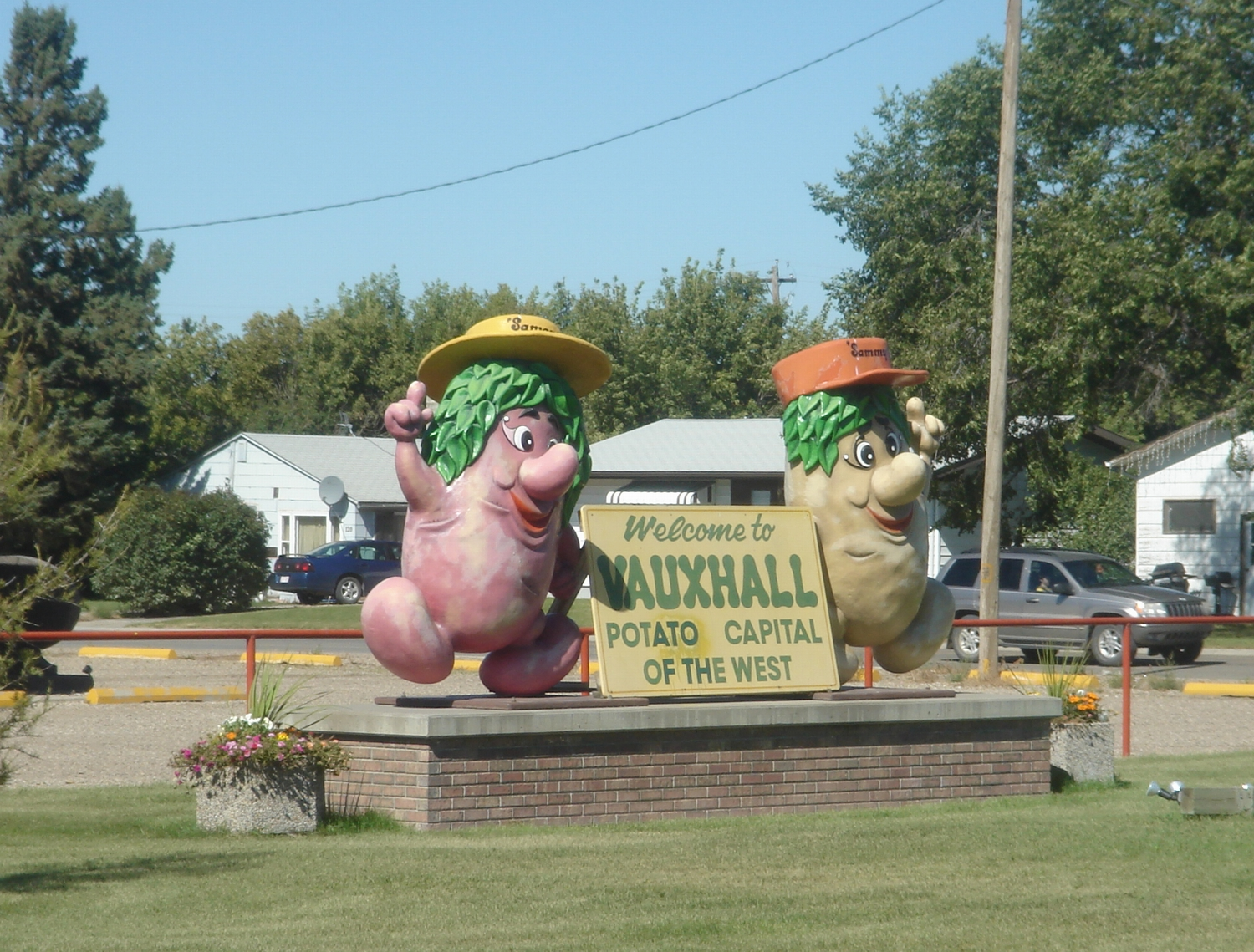
Town mascots Sammy and Samantha Spud, two potatoes dressed as farmers, greeting northbound travellers into Vauxhall

== Demographics ==
In the 2021 Census of Population conducted by Statistics Canada, the Town of Vauxhall had a population of 1,286 living in 436 of its 457 total private dwellings, a change of 5.2% from its 2016 population of 1,222. With a land area of 2.71 km^{2} (1.05 sq mi), it had a population density of 474.5/km^{2} (1,229.0/sq mi) in 2021.

In the 2016 Census of Population conducted by Statistics Canada, the Town of Vauxhall recorded a population of 1,222 living in 413 of its 458 total private dwellings, a −5.1% change from its 2011 population of 1,288. With a land area of 2.72 km^{2} (1.05 sq mi), it had a population density of 449.3/km^{2} (1,163.6/sq mi) in 2016.

== Infrastructure ==
The town is served by the Vauxhall Airport, located 5 kilometres (3.1 mi) south of the town.

== Education ==
The Town of Vauxhall is served by two schools, Vauxhall High School and Vauxhall Elementary School.

== Geography ==
=== Climate ===
Like much of southern Alberta, Vauxhall experiences a semi-arid climate (Köppen climate classification BSk). In winter the community is prone to a Chinook wind which blows off the Rocky Mountains. This can bring periods of extremely warm temperatures relative to what would normally be seen at that time of year. The highest temperature ever recorded in Vauxhall was 40.6 °C (105 °F) on 16 July 1919 and 20 July 1921. The coldest temperature ever recorded was −48.9 °C (−56 °F) on 12 January 1916.

Climate data for Vauxhall, 1981–2010 normals, extremes 1913–present
Month	Jan	Feb	Mar	Apr	May	Jun	Jul	Aug	Sep	Oct	Nov	Dec	Year
Record high °C (°F)	19.4 (66.9)	24.0 (75.2)	27.5 (81.5)	33.3 (91.9)	35.0 (95.0)	37.8 (100.0)	40.6 (105.1)	39.9 (103.8)	37.8 (100.0)	31.0 (87.8)	22.2 (72.0)	17.5 (63.5)	40.6 (105.1)
Mean daily maximum °C (°F)	−2.9 (26.8)	0.5 (32.9)	6.1 (43.0)	13.7 (56.7)	19.0 (66.2)	22.3 (72.1)	25.5 (77.9)	25.8 (78.4)	20.7 (69.3)	13.4 (56.1)	4.5 (40.1)	−0.6 (30.9)	12.3 (54.1)
Daily mean °C (°F)	−9.2 (15.4)	−6.1 (21.0)	−0.9 (30.4)	6.0 (42.8)	11.4 (52.5)	15.4 (59.7)	17.7 (63.9)	17.4 (63.3)	12.4 (54.3)	5.7 (42.3)	−1.9 (28.6)	−6.8 (19.8)	5.1 (41.2)
Mean daily minimum °C (°F)	−15.4 (4.3)	−12.7 (9.1)	−7.8 (18.0)	−1.6 (29.1)	3.8 (38.8)	8.6 (47.5)	10.0 (50.0)	8.9 (48.0)	4.1 (39.4)	−1.9 (28.6)	−8.2 (17.2)	−12.9 (8.8)	−2.1 (28.2)
Record low °C (°F)	−48.9 (−56.0)	−43.3 (−45.9)	−38.5 (−37.3)	−25.6 (−14.1)	−11.7 (10.9)	−2.2 (28.0)	−0.6 (30.9)	−1 (30)	−10.6 (12.9)	−29.4 (−20.9)	−36 (−33)	−45 (−49)	−48.9 (−56.0)
Average precipitation mm (inches)	11.1 (0.44)	10.0 (0.39)	15.3 (0.60)	25.1 (0.99)	40.0 (1.57)	72.9 (2.87)	32.9 (1.30)	32.9 (1.30)	34.9 (1.37)	14.4 (0.57)	15.0 (0.59)	11.6 (0.46)	316.0 (12.44)
Average rainfall mm (inches)	0.0 (0.0)	0.2 (0.01)	2.3 (0.09)	17.7 (0.70)	35.7 (1.41)	72.9 (2.87)	32.9 (1.30)	32.5 (1.28)	33.9 (1.33)	9.0 (0.35)	1.8 (0.07)	0.6 (0.02)	239.5 (9.43)
Average snowfall cm (inches)	11.1 (4.4)	9.8 (3.9)	12.9 (5.1)	7.4 (2.9)	4.2 (1.7)	0.0 (0.0)	0.0 (0.0)	0.4 (0.2)	1.0 (0.4)	5.4 (2.1)	13.2 (5.2)	10.9 (4.3)	76.4 (30.1)
Source: Environment Canada

== See also ==
- List of communities in Alberta
- List of towns in Alberta
