= Tabar (surname) =

Tabar is a surname. Notable people with the surname include:

- Amir Shayesteh Tabar (born 1967), Iranian artist, painter, poet, and filmmaker
- Hashem Rafii Tabar (born 1948), British-Iranian professor and scientist
- Madeleine Tabar (born 1958), Lebanese actress
- Nur Tabar (1941–2022), Tajik politician
- N'Deye Tabar Fall, Mauritanian politician
- Shohreh Aghdashloo née Vaziri-Tabar (born 1952), American-Iranian actress
- Sahar Tabar (born 2001), Iranian influencer
- Viviane Tabar, American neurosurgeon
