= Tabăra =

Tabăra may refer to several villages in Romania:

- Tabăra, a village in Bivolari Commune, Iași County
- Tabăra, a village in Icușești Commune, Neamț County

and a village in Moldova:

- Tabăra, a village in Vatici Commune, Orhei District
