= 2013 Alberta municipal censuses =

- April 1–June 30, 2013 (Note: Although legislation defines April 1 through June 30 inclusive as the annual period in which municipalities may conduct censuses, Alberta Municipal Affairs made an exception for Northern Sunrise County's 2013 municipal census.)
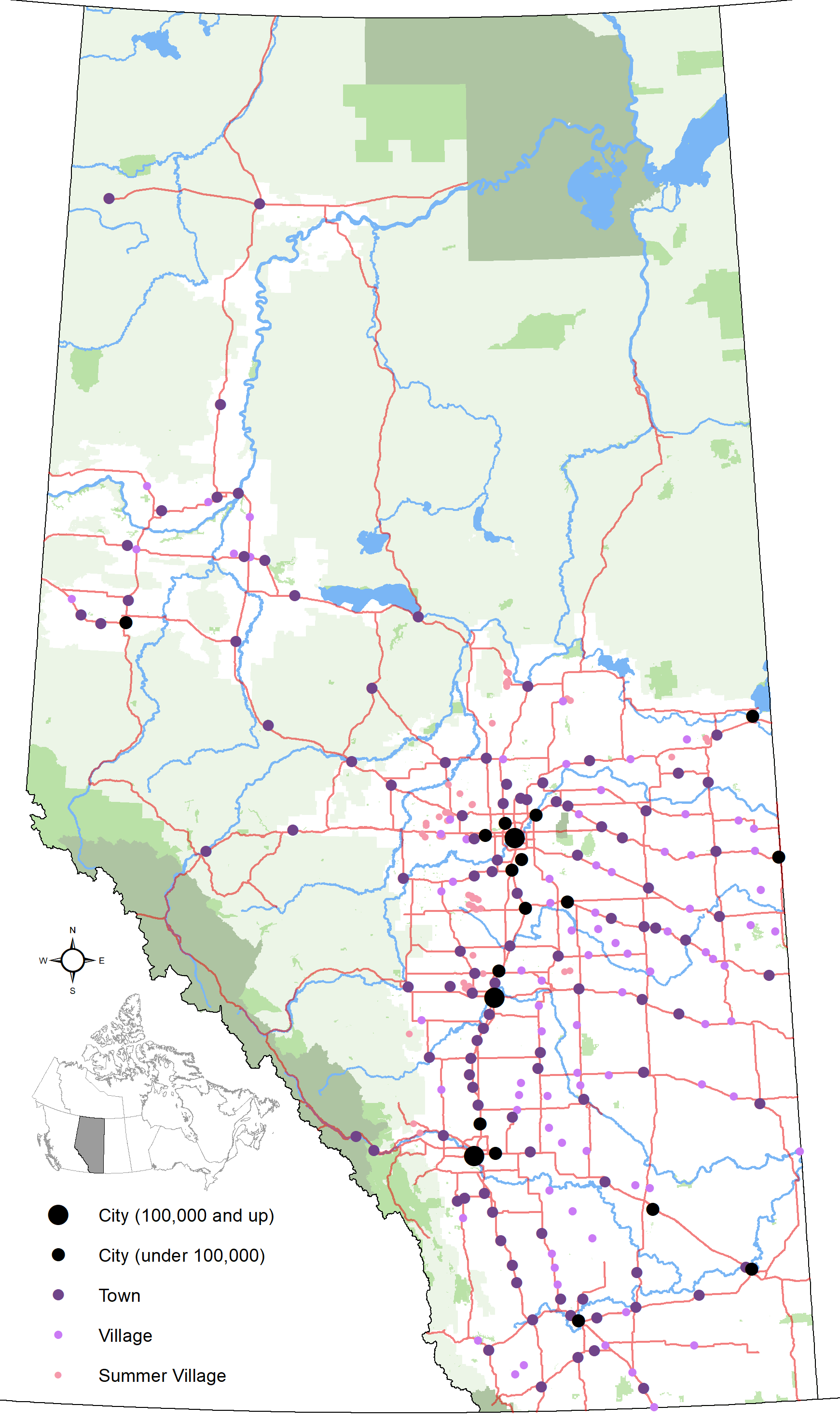
- Distribution of Alberta's 269 urban municipalities as of August 31, 2013

Alberta has provincial legislation allowing its municipalities to conduct municipal censuses between April 1 and June 30 inclusive. Municipalities choose to conduct their own censuses for multiple reasons such as to better inform municipal service planning and provision, to capitalize on per capita based grant funding from higher levels of government, or to simply update their populations since the last federal census.

Alberta had 358 municipalities between April 1 and June 30, 2013, (Note: By the end of 2013, the total number of municipalities dropped to 357 due to the dissolution of Tilley from village status to become a hamlet under the jurisdiction of the County of Newell on August 31, 2013.) down from 359 during the same three-month period in 2012. (Note: The Village of New Norway dissolved to become a hamlet under the jurisdiction of Camrose County on November 1, 2012.) At least 40 of these municipalities (11.2%) conducted a municipal census in 2013. Alberta Municipal Affairs recognized those conducted by 38 of these municipalities. By municipal status, it recognized those conducted by 8 of Alberta's 17 cities, 16 of 108 towns, 5 of 94 villages, 1 of 51 summer villages and 8 of 64 municipal districts. (Note: No censuses were conducted among Alberta's 5 specialized municipalities, 3 special areas and 8 improvement districts.) In addition to those recognized by Municipal Affairs, censuses were conducted by the Town of Swan Hills and the Municipal District of Greenview No. 16.

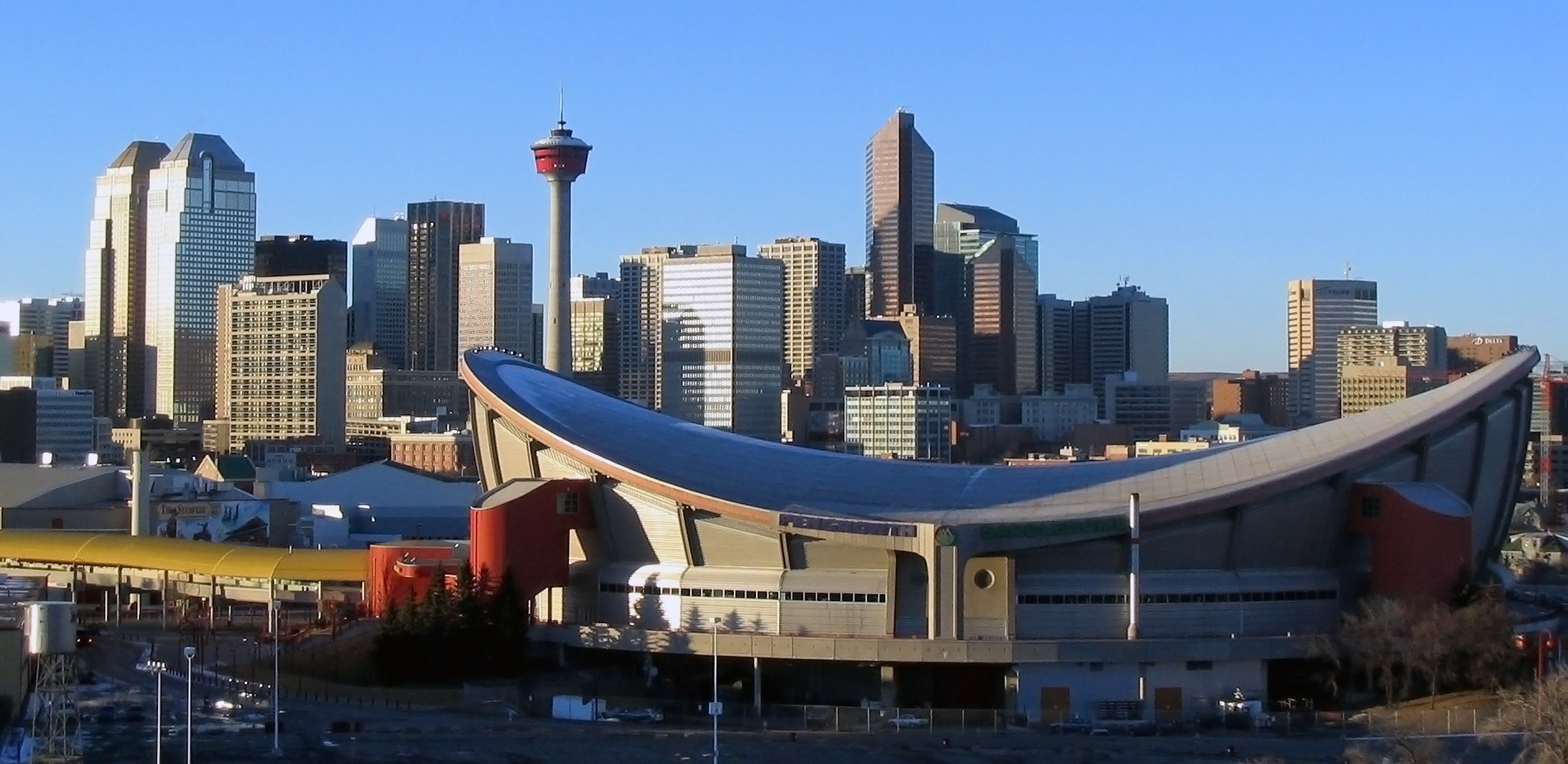
Calgary's population surpassed 1.15 million in 2013.

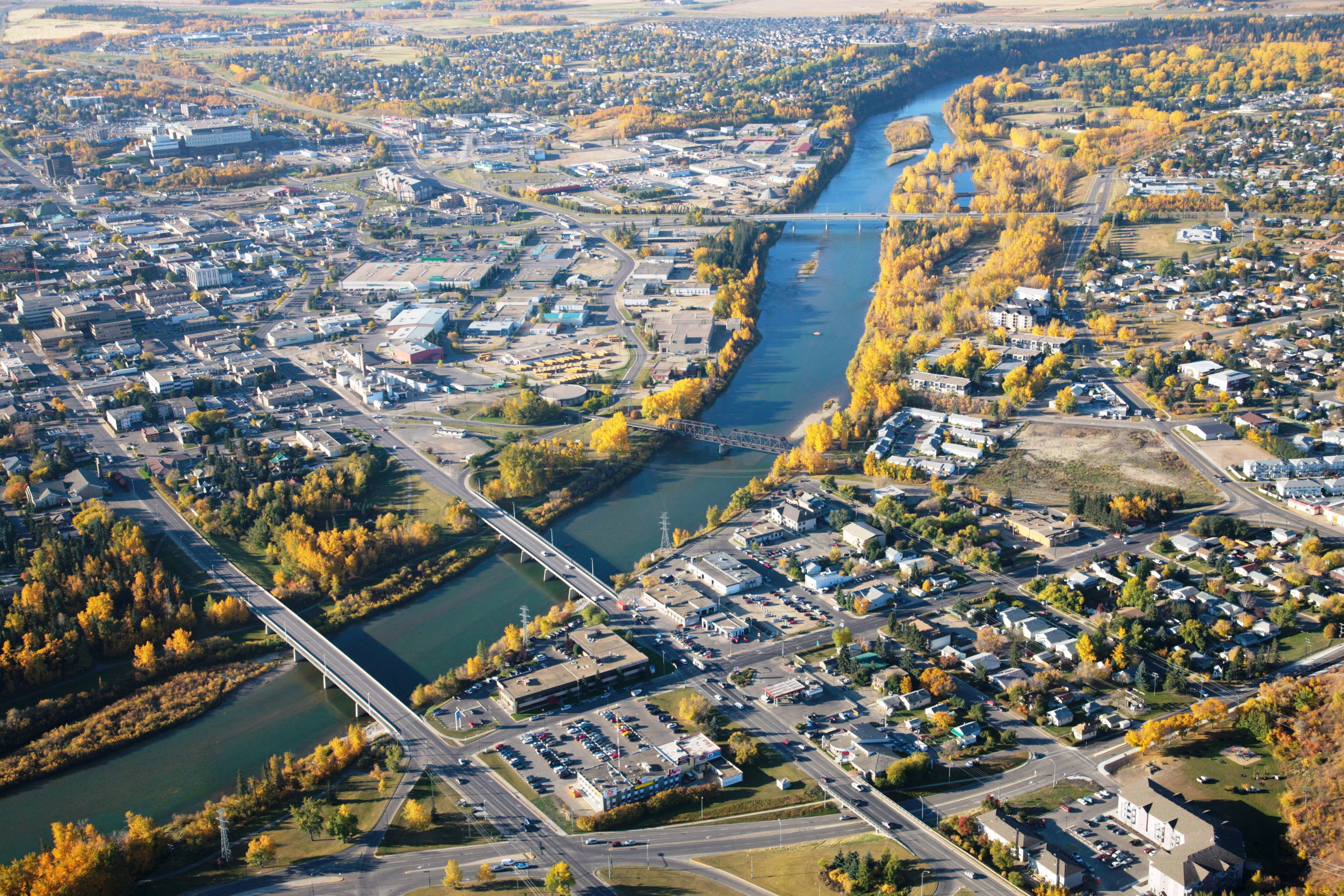
Red Deer's municipal census placed its population within 3,000 of the 100,000-mark.

Some municipalities achieved population milestones as a result of their 2013 censuses. The cities of Lethbridge and Lloydminster surpassed the 90,000 and the 30,000 marks respectively. Furthermore, the Alberta and Saskatchewan portions of Lloydminster exceeded the 20,000 and 10,000 milestones respectively as well. Okotoks, Alberta's largest town, surpassed 25,000 residents, while the Town of Whitecourt became eligible for city status by eclipsing 10,000 people. The Town of Blackfalds and the Municipal District of Taber each surpassed the 7,000-mark and the Town of Wainwright grew beyond 6,000.

== Municipal census results ==
The following summarizes the results of the numerous municipal censuses conducted in 2013.

| 2013 municipal census summary | | | | 2011 federal census comparison | | | | Previous municipal census comparison | | | |
| Municipality | Status | Census date | 2013 pop. | 2011 pop. | Absolute growth | Absolute change | Annual growth rate | Prev. pop. | Prev. census year | Absolute growth | Annual growth rate |
|---|---|---|---|---|---|---|---|---|---|---|---|
| Airdrie | City | April 1, 2013 | 49,560 | 42,564 | 6,996 | 16.4% | 7.9% | 45,711 | 2012 | 3,849 | 8.4% |
| Beaumont | Town | May 1, 2013 | 14,916 | 13,284 | 1,632 | 12.3% | 6.0% | 13,977 | 2012 | 939 | 6.7% |
| MD of Big Lakes | Municipal district | May 15, 2013 | 3,861 | 4,194 | −333 | −7.9% | −4.1% | 4,181 | 2002 | −320 | −0.7% |
| Blackfalds | Town | May 4, 2013 | 7,275 | 6,300 | 975 | 15.5% | 7.5% | 6,767 | 2012 | 508 | 7.5% |
| Calgary | City | April 1, 2013 | 1,156,686 (Note: The City of Calgary's 2013 municipal census population was originally reported as 1,149,552. This population was revised to 1,156,686 in July 2014. The city's revised 2013 census report explains it was "adjusted upward due to a correction to the automated conversion process.") | 1,096,833 | 59,853 | 5.5% | 2.7% | 1,120,225 | 2012 | 36,461 | 3.3% |
| Carmangay | Village | May 15, 2013 | 262 | 367 | −105 | −28.6% | −15.5% | 273 | 2010 | −11 | −1.4% |
| Chestermere | Town | April 1, 2013 | 15,762 | 14,824 | 938 | 6.3% | 3.1% | 15,352 | 2012 | 410 | 2.7% |
| Coaldale | Town | April 1, 2013 | 7,526 | 7,493 | 33 | 0.4% | 0.2% | 6,943 | 2009 | 583 | 1.6% |
| Coalhurst | Town | May 21, 2013 | 2,301 | 1,963 | 338 | 17.2% | 8.3% | 2,269 | 2012 | 32 | 1.4% |
| Cochrane | Town | April 1, 2013 | 18,750 | 17,580 | 1,170 | 6.7% | 3.3% | 15,424 | 2009 | 3,326 | 5.0% |
| Fort Saskatchewan | City | April 15, 2013 | 21,795 | 19,051 | 2,744 | 14.4% | 7.0% | 20,475 | 2012 | 1,320 | 6.4% |
| Fox Creek | Town | May 13, 2013 | 2,112 | 1,969 | 143 | 7.3% | 3.6% | 2,257 | 1995 | −145 | −0.4% |
| MD of Greenview No. 16 | Municipal district | May 13, 2013 | 5,242 (Note: The MD of Greenview No. 16's 2013 municipal census population is based on 93% household enumeration.) | 5,299 | −57 | −1.1% | −0.5% | 5,516 | 2000 | −274 | −0.4% |
| Kitscoty | Village | May 1, 2013 | 967 | 846 | 121 | 14.3% | 6.9% | 892 | 2011 | 75 | 4.1% |
| Lac La Biche County | Municipal district | May 15, 2013 | 9,094 | 8,402 | 692 | 8.2% | 4.0% | | | | |
| Leduc | City | April 29, 2013 | 27,241 | 24,279 | 2,962 | 12.2% | 5.9% | 25,482 | 2012 | 1,759 | 6.9% |
| Lethbridge | City | April 1, 2013 | 90,417 | 83,517 | 6,900 | 8.3% | 4.0% | 89,074 | 2012 | 1,343 | 1.5% |
| Lloydminster | City | April 1, 2013 | 31,483 | 27,804 | 3,679 | 13.2% | 6.4% | 26,502 | 2009 | 4,981 | 4.4% |
| Lougheed | Village | April 24, 2013 | 273 | 233 | 40 | 17.2% | 8.2% | 254 | 2010 | 19 | 2.4% |
| Magrath | Town | May 1, 2013 | 2,376 | 2,217 | 159 | 7.2% | 3.5% | 2,302 | 2010 | 74 | 1.1% |
| Marwayne | Village | May 31, 2013 | 667 | 612 | 55 | 9% | 4.4% | 569 | 2007 | 98 | 2.7% |
| Northern Sunrise County | Municipal district | March 5, 2013 | 1,933 | 1,791 | 142 | 7.9% | 3.9% | 2,133 | 2011 | −200 | −4.8% |
| Okotoks | Town | May 8, 2013 | 26,319 | 24,511 | 1,808 | 7.4% | 3.6% | 24,962 | 2012 | 1,357 | 5.4% |
| Olds | Town | April 3, 2013 | 8,511 | 8,235 | 276 | 3.4% | 1.7% | 6,703 | 2005 | 1,808 | 3.0% |
| MD of Opportunity No. 17 | Municipal district | April 1, 2013 | 3,061 | 3,074 | −13 | −0.4% | −0.2% | 3,259 | 2007 | −198 | −1.0% |
| Pincher Creek | Town | April 1, 2013 | 3,619 | 3,685 | −66 | −1.8% | −0.9% | 3,712 | 2008 | −93 | −0.5% |
| Point Alison | Summer village | June 28, 2013 | 10 | 15 | −5 | −33.3% | −18.4% | 6 | 2010 | 4 | 18.6% |
| MD of Ranchland No. 66 | Municipal district | June 21, 2013 | 104 | 79 | 25 | 31.6% | 14.7% | | | | |
| Raymond | Town | May 15, 2013 | 3,982 | 3,743 | 239 | 6.4% | 3.1% | 3,891 | 2012 | 91 | 1.2% |
| Red Deer | City | April 1, 2013 | 97,109 | 90,564 | 6,545 | 7.2% | 3.6% | 91,877 | 2011 | 5,232 | 2.8% |
| Rocky View County | Municipal district | May 1, 2013 | 38,055 | 35,754 (Note: Rocky View County's 2011 census population was originally 36,461, but was subsequently reduced by 707 to 35,754 as a result of the City of Airdrie's 2011 annexation.) | 2,301 | 6.4% | 3.2% | 34,597 | 2006 | 3,458 | 1.4% |
| Spruce Grove | City | April 12, 2013 | 27,875 (Note: The City of Spruce Grove's 2013 municipal census population is based on 93% household enumeration. To arrive at a more accurate population, it also published an extrapolated population of 29,960.) | 26,171 | 1,704 | 6.5% | 3.2% | 24,646 | 2010 | 3,229 | 4.2% |
| Starland County | Municipal district | April 8, 2013 | 2,071 | 2,057 | 14 | 0.7% | 0.3% | | | | |
| Stirling | Village | May 13, 2013 | 1,147 | 1,090 | 57 | 5.2% | 2.6% | 1,157 | 2010 | −10 | −0.3% |
| Swan Hills | Town | | (Note: Swan Hills' 2013 municipal census population has not been published by Alberta Municipal Affairs or the Town of Swan Hills.) | 1,465 | | | | 1,858 | 2008 | | |
| Sylvan Lake | Town | April 19, 2013 | 13,015 | 12,327 | 688 | 5.6% | 2.8% | 11,115 | 2008 | 1,900 | 3.2% |
| MD of Taber | Municipal district | May 15, 2013 | 7,116 | 6,851 | 265 | 3.9% | 1.9% | 6,714 | 2008 | 402 | 1.2% |
| Valleyview | Town | June 1, 2013 | 1,972 | 1,761 | 211 | 12% | 5.8% | 1,884 | 2007 | 88 | 0.8% |
| Wainwright | Town | May 1, 2013 | 6,289 | 5,925 | 364 | 6.1% | 3.0% | 5,775 | 2008 | 514 | 1.7% |
| Whitecourt | Town | May 1, 2013 | 10,574 | 9,605 | 969 | 10.1% | 4.9% | 9,202 | 2008 | 1,372 | 2.8% |

== Breakdowns ==
=== Lloydminster ===
The following is a breakdown of the results of the City of Lloydminster's 2013 municipal census by provincial component.

| 2013 municipal census summary | | | 2011 federal census comparison | | | | | 2009 municipal census comparison | | | | |
| Provincial component | 2013 pop. | Prov. percent | 2011 pop. | Prov. percent | Absolute growth | Absolute change | Annual growth rate | 2009 pop. | Prov. percent | Absolute growth | Absolute change | Annual growth rate |
|---|---|---|---|---|---|---|---|---|---|---|---|---|
| Alberta portion | 20,011 | 64% | 18,032 | 65% | 1,979 | 11% | 5.3% | 17,402 | 66% | 2,609 | 15% | 3.6% |
| Saskatchewan portion | 11,472 | 36% | 9,772 | 35% | 1,700 | 17.4% | 8.3% | 9,100 | 34% | 2,372 | 26.1% | 6.0% |
| Total Lloydminster | 31,483 | 100% | 27,804 | 100% | 3,679 | 13.2% | 6.4% | 26,502 | 100% | 4,981 | 18.8% | 4.4% |

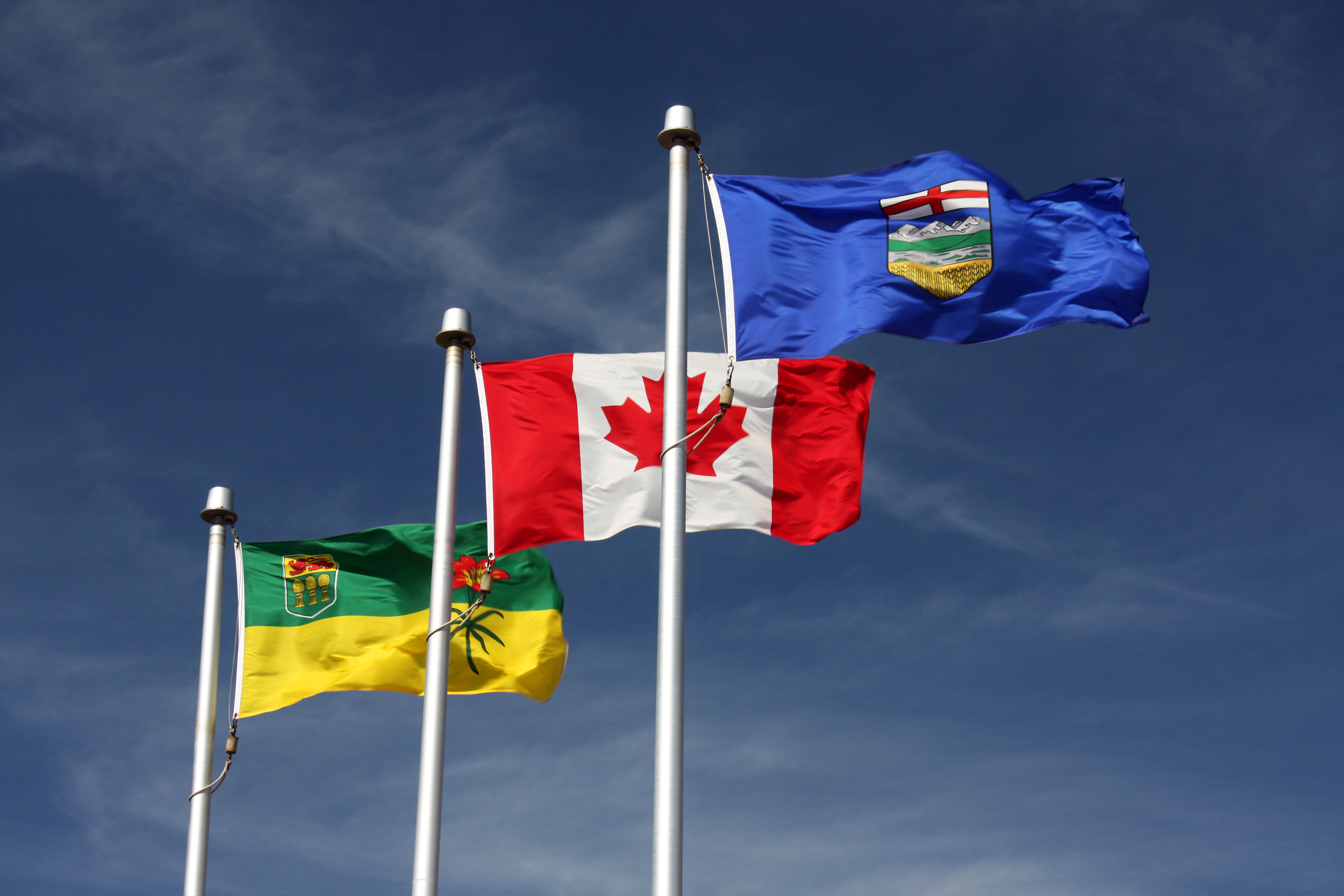
In Lloydminster, its Alberta and Saskatchewan populations surpassed 20,000 and 10,000 respectively for the first time.

=== Hamlets ===
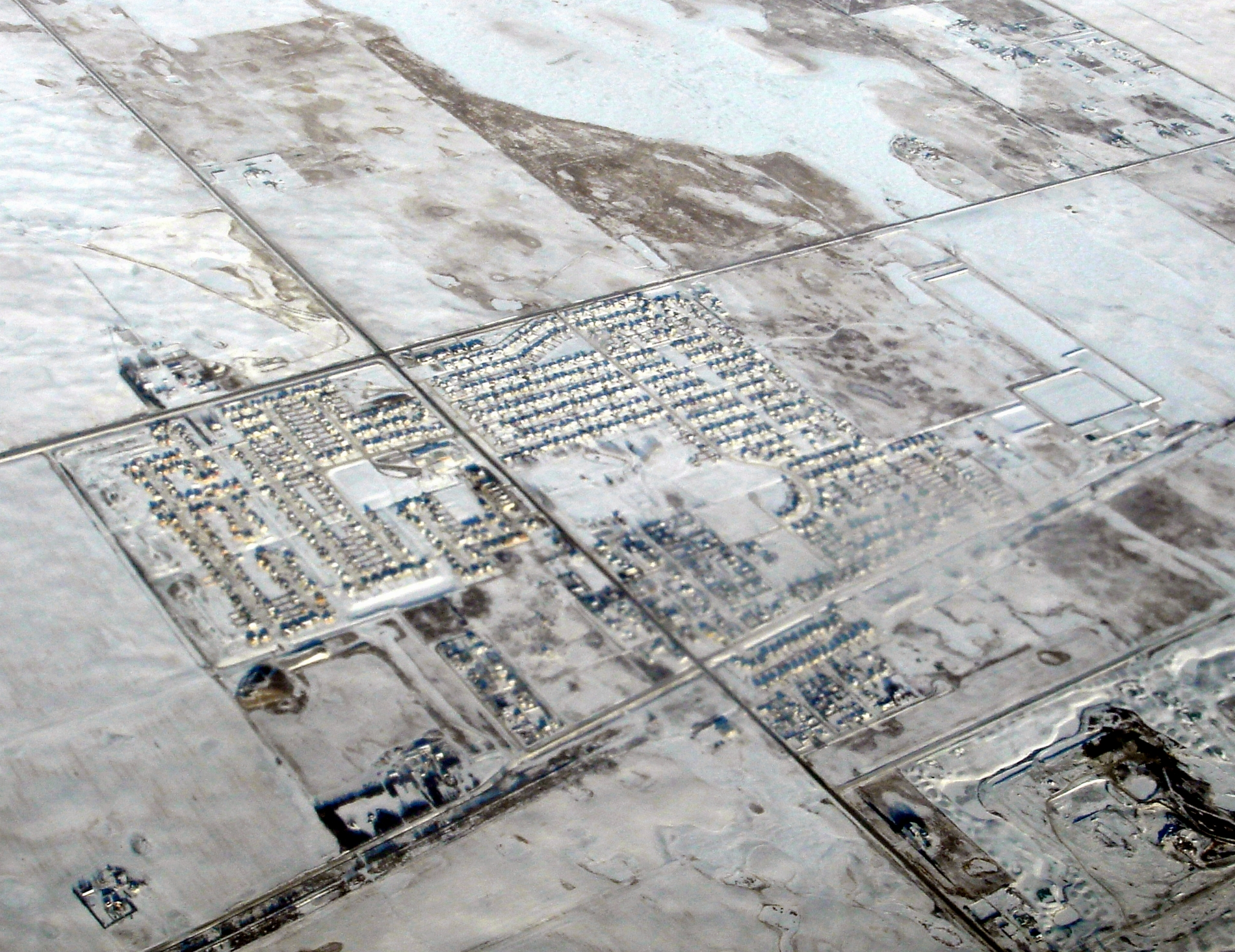
Rocky View County's 2013 census revealed that the Hamlet of Langdon's population has grown by 87% since 2006, the year this photo was taken.

The following is a list of hamlet populations determined by 2013 municipal censuses conducted by three municipalities.

| 2013 municipal census summary | | | Previous census comparison | | | |
| Hamlet | Municipality | 2013 population | Previous population | Previous census year | Absolute growth | Annual growth rate |
|---|---|---|---|---|---|---|
| Bragg Creek | Rocky View County | 454 | 454 | 2006 | 0 | 0.0% |
| Cochrane Lake | Rocky View County | 792 | 243 | 2006 | 549 | 18.4% |
| Conrich | Rocky View County | 26 | 26 | 2006 | 0 | 0.0% |
| Dalemead | Rocky View County | 27 | 31 | 2006 | −4 | −2.0% |
| Dalroy | Rocky View County | 50 | 43 | 2006 | 7 | 2.2% |
| Enchant | MD of Taber | 289 | 205 | 2008 | 84 | 7.1% |
| Grassy Lake | MD of Taber | 778 | 596 | 2008 | 182 | 5.5% |
| Hays | MD of Taber | 163 | 140 | 2008 | 23 | 3.1% |
| Indus | Rocky View County | 36 | 47 | 2006 | −11 | −3.7% |
| Johnson's Addition | MD of Taber | 115 | 101 | 2008 | 14 | 2.6% |
| Kathyrn | Rocky View County | 20 | 14 | 2006 | 6 | 5.2% |
| Keoma | Rocky View County | 85 | 67 | 2006 | 18 | 3.5% |
| Lac La Biche | Lac La Biche County | 2,895 | 2,520 | 2011 | 375 | 7.2% |
| Langdon | Rocky View County | 4,897 | 2,617 | 2006 | 2,280 | 9.4% |
| Madden | Rocky View County | 21 | 21 | 2006 | 0 | 0.0% |
| Plamondon | Lac La Biche County | 344 | 345 | 2011 | −1 | −0.1% |
| Purple Springs | MD of Taber | 41 | 34 | 2008 | 7 | 3.8% |

== Shadow population counts ==
Alberta Municipal Affairs defines shadow population as "temporary residents of a municipality who are employed by an industrial or commercial establishment in the municipality for a minimum of 30 days within a municipal census year." Numerous municipalities conducted shadow population counts at the same time as their municipal censuses in 2013. The following presents the results of those municipalities that conducted shadow population counts and compares them with their municipal census results.

| Municipality | Status | Municipal census population | Shadow population | Combined population |
|---|---|---|---|---|
| Lac La Biche County | Municipal district | 9,094 | 3,126 | 12,220 |
| Northern Sunrise County | Municipal district | 1,933 | 592 | 2,525 |

== See also ==
- 2013 Alberta municipal elections
- List of communities in Alberta
- List of municipalities in Alberta
