= Municipal census in Canada =

Four provinces and territories in Canada have legislation that allow municipalities to conduct a municipal census. These include the provinces of Alberta and Saskatchewan and the territories of Nunavut and Yukon. Of these four provinces and territories, municipalities in Alberta were the only ones that exercise the option to conduct a municipal census as of 2006.

== Alberta ==
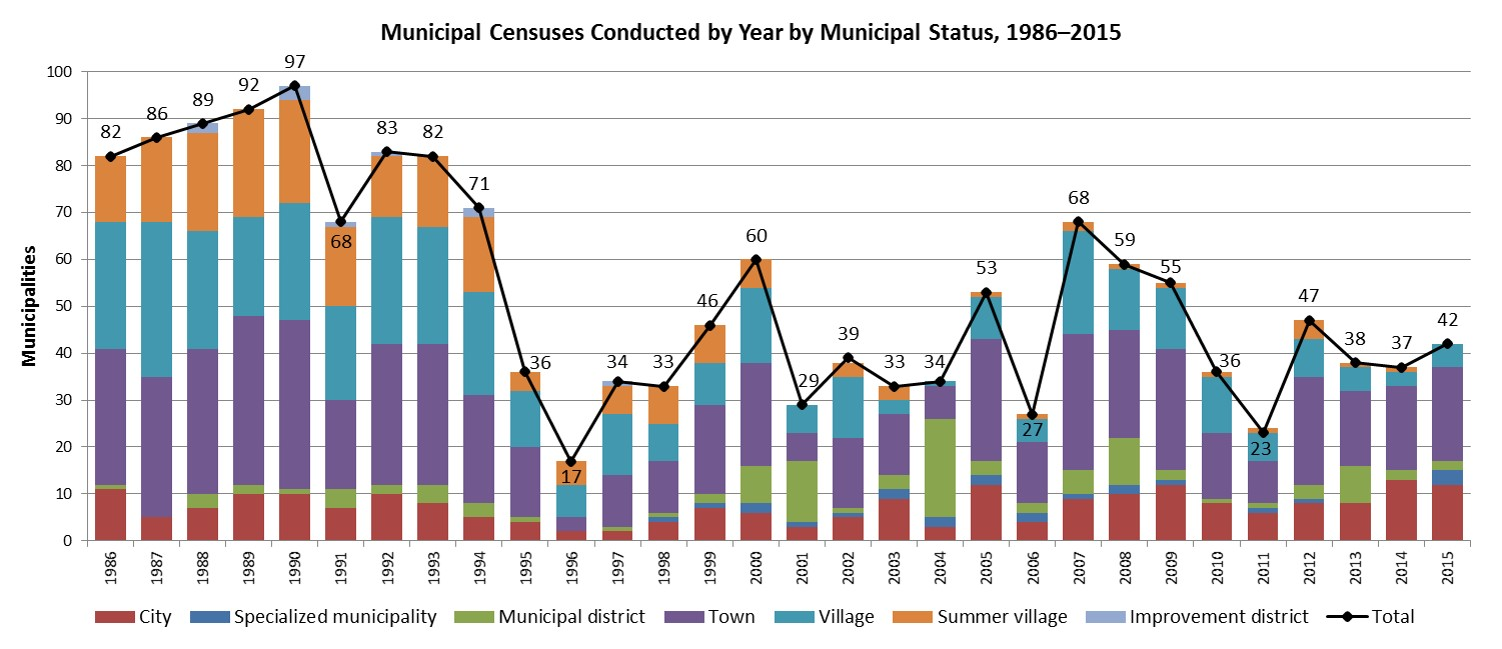
Total amount of municipal censuses conducted by year according to Alberta Municipal Affairs population lists

Alberta's Municipal Government Act (MGA) is the enabling legislation that allows its municipalities to conduct their own censuses. The MGA also stipulates that the Minister of Alberta Municipal Affairs (AMA) may regulate how municipal populations are determined and how they are conducted. The regulation that stipulates these is the MGA's Determination of Population Regulation (DOPR).

The DOPR provides a three-month period for municipalities to conduct censuses, which begins on April 1 and ends on June 30, and requires the municipalities to set a census date within this period relating to enumeration. It also requires that censuses be conducted in accordance with a training manual approved by the Minister of AMA, and submission of the results to AMA before September 1 of the same year in which the census is conducted. The results become the populations of the submitting municipalities if they are accepted by the Minister of AMA.

The conducting of municipal censuses in Alberta is widespread. Between 2007 and 2011 inclusive, the last full five-year period between Statistics Canada's releases of the last two federal censuses, 157 of its 357 municipalities conducted at least one municipal census. Of these, each of Alberta's 17 cities and 8 Metis settlements conducted censuses, as well as 64 of its 108 towns, 45 of its 93 villages, 3 of its 51 summer villages, 3 of its 5 specialized municipalities and 17 of its 64 municipal districts. In 2013, at least 40 municipalities conducted censuses. Alberta recognized censuses conducted by 38 of these municipalities.

Municipalities choose to conduct their own censuses with the goal of acceptance by Alberta Municipal Affairs for multiple reasons. Municipal censuses allow for collection of important demographic data to assist in the planning and provision of community services. They also allow municipalities experiencing high levels of population growth to capitalize on increased provincial grant funding involving population per capita formulae. Some municipalities simply choose to conduct a census to verify it has grown since the last federal census.

Historically, municipal censuses are conducted via paper-based enumeration of households done door-to-door. More recently, municipalities have been permitted to conduct them electronically door-to-door using wireless handheld devices or online with census question responses being entered directly into a secure census database by a representative of the household. During enumeration, only those people enumerated that are "usual residents" (Note: The Determination of Population Regulation (DOPR) states that "a person can have only one place of usual residence" and "if a person has more than one residence in Alberta, that person shall... designate one place of residence as the person's usual residence". Generally, "usual residents" are therefore, according to Alberta's Municipal Census Manual: 1. "all persons who usually live in the dwelling, even if they are temporarily away (such as on a business trip or at school), such as college/university students who have not established a usual residence elsewhere"; 2. "any persons staying or visiting the dwelling if they have no other usual home"; 3. "hotel residents and employees who have no usual home elsewhere"; 4. "any persons who usually live in the dwelling, but are currently in an institution (such as a hospital or correctional institution)" for no more than six months; 5. "persons in the Armed Forces even if away on tour/rotation"; 6. "infants born before or on the census date"; and; 7. "deceased persons who were alive on the census date".) of that municipality may be included in the total population count. However, a municipality may enumerate those that are not "usual residents" as its "shadow population" (Note: The DOPR defines "shadow population" as "the temporary residents of a municipality who are employed by an industrial or commercial establishment in the municipality for a minimum of 30 days within a municipal census year.") if approved by the Minister of AMA.

== Nunavut ==
The Cities, Towns and Villages Act and the Hamlets Act enables Nunavut's municipalities to conduct their own censuses. As of 2006, municipalities in Nunavut were not exercising their opportunities to conduct their own censuses.

== Saskatchewan ==
The Municipalities Act allows municipalities within Saskatchewan to conduct their own censuses. The City of Lloydminster, which straddles Saskatchewan's provincial boundary with Alberta, conducted municipal censuses in 2005, 2007, 2009 and 2013. Convinced Statistics Canada undercounted its population during the Canada 2011 Census, the Town of La Ronge conducted its own census in 2012. A municipal census was conducted in 2019 for the Organized Hamlet of Elk Ridge to inform an application for resort village status.

== Yukon ==
Municipalities in Yukon may conduct their own censuses pursuant to the Municipal Act. As of 2006, municipalities in Yukon were not exercising their opportunities to conduct their own censuses.

== See also ==
- Census in Canada
