= Taber, Alberta =

Town in Canada

Taber
- Town
- Town of Taber
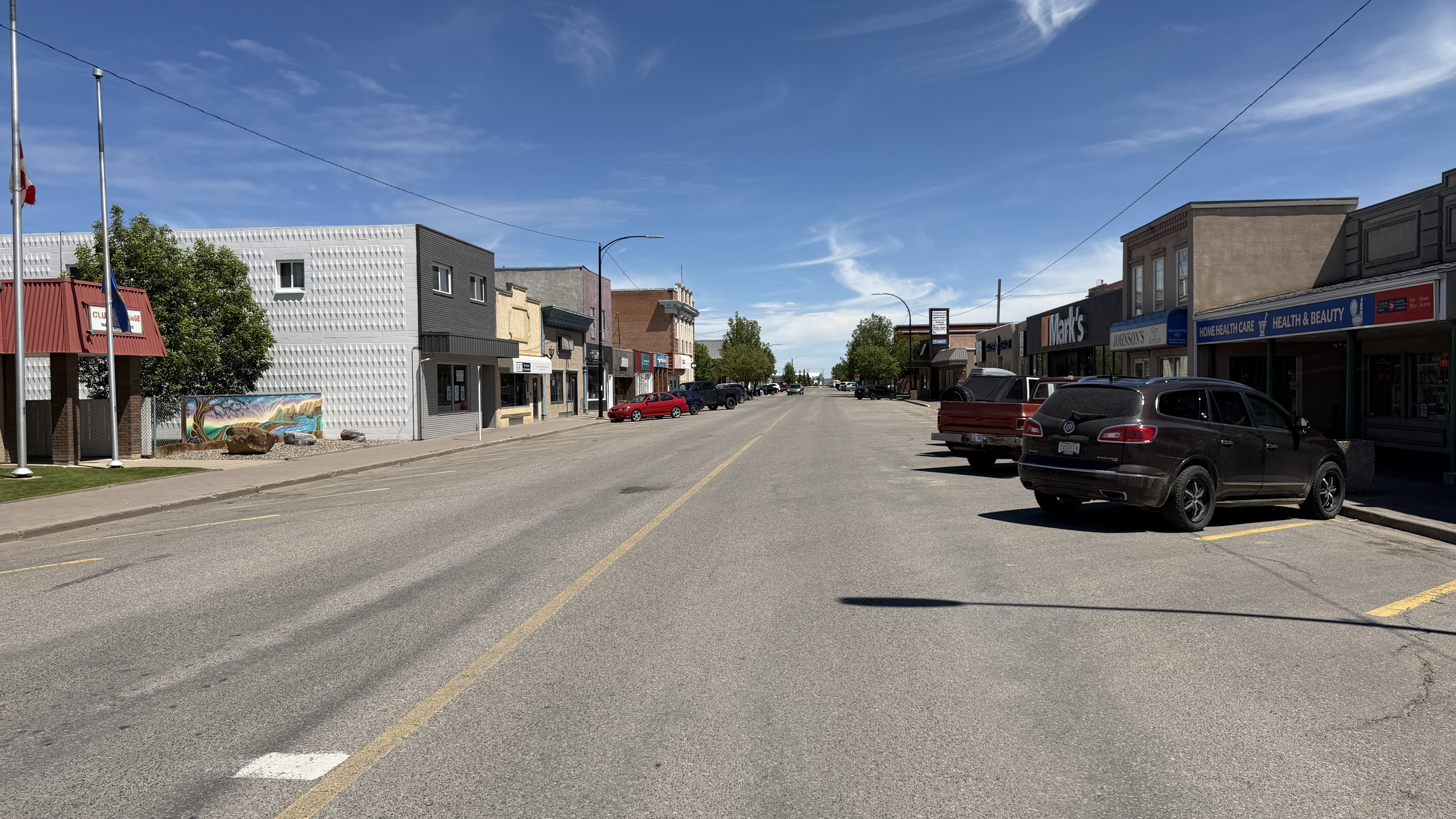
- Downtown Taber

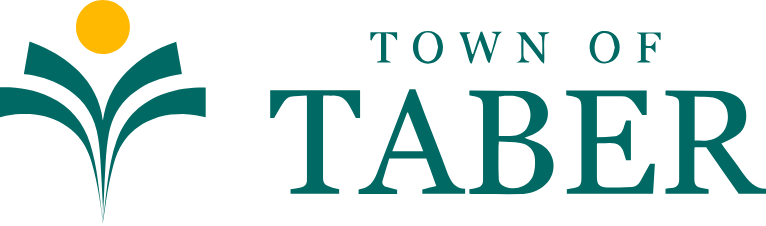
- Coat of arms Logo
- Motto: "Unity, Growth, Prosperity"
- Location of Taber in Alberta
- Coordinates: 49°47′05″N 112°09′03″W
- Country: Canada
- Province: Alberta
- Region: Southern Alberta
- Census division: 2
- Municipal district: Municipal District of Taber
- Incorporated
  - Village: March 15, 1905
  - Town: July 1, 1907

Government
  - Type: Mayor-Council government
  - Mayor: Andrew Prokop
  - Governing body: Taber Town Council: Jack Brewin; Garth Bekkering; Monica McLean; Carly Firth; Daniel Remfert; Joanne Sorensen
  - CAO: Derrin Thibault
  - MLA: Grant Hunter (UCP)

Area (2021)
  - Land: 19.32 km^{2} (7.46 sq mi)
- Elevation: 815 m (2,674 ft)

Population (2021)
  - Total: 8,862
  - Density: 458.6/km^{2} (1,188/sq mi)
  - Municipal census (2020): 8,711
- Time zone: UTC−06:00 (Alberta Time)
- Forward sortation area: T1G
- Highways: Highway 3 Highway 36
- Waterway: Oldman River
- Website: www.taber.ca

Taber (/ˈteɪbər/ TAY-bər) is a town in southern Alberta, Canada that is surrounded by the Municipal District of Taber. It is approximately 51 km (32 mi) east of the City of Lethbridge at the intersection of Highway 3 and Highway 36.

Taber is famous for its corn due to the large amounts of sunshine the area receives. It is therefore known as the Corn Capital of Canada and holds an annual "Cornfest" in the last week of August.

== History ==
Originally, Taber was known as "Tank No. 77," and was used by the railway to fill up on water. In 1903, it is said that the first Mormon settlers from the U.S. were the ones to establish a hamlet at the Tank. After the town's post office was built in 1907, the CPR decided to call the town "Tabor," probably after Mount Tabor in the Holy Land. However, various letters and station heads came out printed "Taber," so the CPR changed the name to make it match the records.

An alternate version of the town's name origin is that the first part of the word tabernacle was used by Mormon settlers in the vicinity, and the next Canadian Pacific Railway station was named Elcan (nacle spelled backwards).

After time, Taber became a successful coal mining town. Coal mining declined in the late 1920s, but picked up in the 1930s after extensive irrigation in the area.

During the Second World War, Japanese Canadians were forcibly relocated to Alberta where some were compelled into forced labor, many in sugar beet cultivation, for the duration of the war.

Irrigation helped not only the coal miners, it also brought with it the production of sugar beets. In 1950, a sugar beet processing plant (Roger's Sugar) was built, which has become a vital part of the town's economy.

A number of archaeological discoveries were made in the vicinity of Taber, including that of extinct buffalo, and the so-called "Taber child" in 1961 by the head of a Geological Survey of Canada team Dr. Archie Stalker in the glacial deposits along the east bank of the Oldman River.

== Geography ==
=== Climate ===
Taber experiences a semi-arid climate (Köppen climate classification BSk). The highest temperature ever recorded in Taber was 40.6 °C (105 °F) on 17 July 1936. The coldest temperature ever recorded was −43.3 °C (−46 °F) on 23 January 1969.

Climate data for Taber, 1981–2010 normals, extremes 1907–present
Month	Jan	Feb	Mar	Apr	May	Jun	Jul	Aug	Sep	Oct	Nov	Dec	Year
Record high °C (°F)	18.0 (64.4)	24.0 (75.2)	28.0 (82.4)	31.1 (88.0)	36.1 (97.0)	39.4 (102.9)	40.6 (105.1)	38.5 (101.3)	35.6 (96.1)	31.1 (88.0)	23.5 (74.3)	19.0 (66.2)	40.6 (105.1)
Mean daily maximum °C (°F)	−0.7 (30.7)	2.6 (36.7)	5.6 (42.1)	13.6 (56.5)	18.7 (65.7)	22.2 (72.0)	27.1 (80.8)	27.2 (81.0)	20.7 (69.3)	13.6 (56.5)	5.3 (41.5)	0.2 (32.4)	13.0 (55.4)
Daily mean °C (°F)	−6.6 (20.1)	−3.4 (25.9)	−0.6 (30.9)	6.6 (43.9)	11.8 (53.2)	15.7 (60.3)	19.5 (67.1)	19.1 (66.4)	13.2 (55.8)	7.0 (44.6)	−0.4 (31.3)	−5.2 (22.6)	6.4 (43.5)
Mean daily minimum °C (°F)	−12.4 (9.7)	−9.5 (14.9)	−6.9 (19.6)	−0.3 (31.5)	4.8 (40.6)	9.1 (48.4)	11.9 (53.4)	11.0 (51.8)	5.6 (42.1)	0.3 (32.5)	−6.1 (21.0)	−10.7 (12.7)	−0.3 (31.5)
Record low °C (°F)	−43.3 (−45.9)	−38 (−36)	−36.7 (−34.1)	−21.1 (−6.0)	−11.7 (10.9)	−1.1 (30.0)	2.8 (37.0)	−0.6 (30.9)	−7.8 (18.0)	−26.5 (−15.7)	−33 (−27)	−42.2 (−44.0)	−43.3 (−45.9)
Average precipitation mm (inches)	16.8 (0.66)	13.6 (0.54)	24.1 (0.95)	31.9 (1.26)	47.8 (1.88)	90.9 (3.58)	29.0 (1.14)	38.9 (1.53)	36.9 (1.45)	18.9 (0.74)	17.3 (0.68)	15.0 (0.59)	381.0 (15.00)
Average rainfall mm (inches)	0.3 (0.01)	0.4 (0.02)	5.3 (0.21)	23.1 (0.91)	43.5 (1.71)	90.9 (3.58)	29.0 (1.14)	38.5 (1.52)	36.4 (1.43)	12.1 (0.48)	3.2 (0.13)	1.3 (0.05)	283.8 (11.17)
Average snowfall cm (inches)	16.5 (6.5)	13.3 (5.2)	19.1 (7.5)	8.8 (3.5)	4.3 (1.7)	0.0 (0.0)	0.0 (0.0)	0.2 (0.1)	0.5 (0.2)	6.8 (2.7)	14.1 (5.6)	13.8 (5.4)	97.4 (38.3)
Source: Environment Canada

== Demographics ==
In the 2021 Census of Population conducted by Statistics Canada, the Town of Taber had a population of 8,862 living in 3,347 of its 3,481 total private dwellings, a change of 5.1% from its 2016 population of 8,428. With a land area of 19.32 km^{2} (7.46 sq mi), it had a population density of 458.7/km^{2} (1,188.0/sq mi) in 2021.

The population of the Town of Taber according to its 2020 municipal census is 8,711, a 3.9% change from its 2015 municipal census population of 8,380.

In the 2016 Census of Population conducted by Statistics Canada, the Town of Taber recorded a population of 8,428 living in 3,159 of its 3,384 total private dwellings, a 4% change from its 2011 population of 8,104. With a land area of 15.67 km^{2} (6.05 sq mi), it had a population density of 537.8/km^{2} (1,393.0/sq mi) in 2016.

Panethnic groups in the Town of Taber (1991−2021)
Panethnic group	2021		2016		2011		2006		2001		1996		1991	
Panethnic group	Pop.	%	Pop.	%	Pop.	%	Pop.	%	Pop.	%	Pop.	%	Pop.	%
European (Note: Statistic includes all persons that did not make up part of a visible minority or an indigenous identity.)	7,325	84.34%	7,265	88.38%	7,315	91.27%	6,970	93.68%	7,000	93.27%	6,715	94.58%	5,945	90.83%
Southeast Asian (Note: Statistic includes total responses of "Filipino" and "Southeast Asian" under visible minority section on census.)	560	6.45%	335	4.08%	145	1.81%	0	0%	10	0.13%	10	0.14%	0	0%
Indigenous	375	4.32%	230	2.8%	275	3.43%	130	1.75%	190	2.53%	80	1.13%	320	4.89%
East Asian (Note: Statistic includes total responses of "Chinese", "Korean", and "Japanese" under visible minority section on census.)	150	1.73%	285	3.47%	200	2.5%	315	4.23%	250	3.33%	260	3.66%	230	3.51%
South Asian	85	0.98%	55	0.67%	0	0%	0	0%	0	0%	0	0%	10	0.15%
Latin American	60	0.69%	30	0.36%	0	0%	25	0.34%	0	0%	30	0.42%	15	0.23%
African	35	0.4%	10	0.12%	0	0%	0	0%	60	0.8%	15	0.21%	0	0%
Middle Eastern (Note: Statistic includes total responses of "West Asian" and "Arab" under visible minority section on census.)	0	0%	10	0.12%	0	0%	0	0%	0	0%	0	0%	0	0%
Other/multiracial (Note: Statistic includes total responses of "Visible minority, n.i.e." and "Multiple visible minorities" under visible minority section on census.)	85	0.98%	20	0.24%	0	0%	0	0%	0	0%	0	0%	25	0.38%
Total responses	8,685	98%	8,220	97.53%	8,015	98.9%	7,440	98.01%	7,505	97.84%	7,100	98.42%	6,545	98.21%
Total population	8,862	100%	8,428	100%	8,104	100%	7,591	100%	7,671	100%	7,214	100%	6,664	100%
Note: Totals greater than 100% due to multiple origin responses

== Economy ==
Taber's economy is largely based on agriculture. Local produce includes pigs, beef, sheep, poultry, sugar beets, potatoes, peas, carrots, wheat, flax, barley, corn, beans, sunflowers, oats, onions, canola and mustard.

Roger's Sugar is Taber's sugar beet processing plant, built in 1950. Lantic Inc., owns and operates the factory. There are several food processing companies based in the town, including a Frito-Lay factory, which produces various snack products for much of Western Canada. As well, sand and gravel are mined here. To a lesser extent, there is also a significant oil and gas component to the economy.

== Arts and culture ==
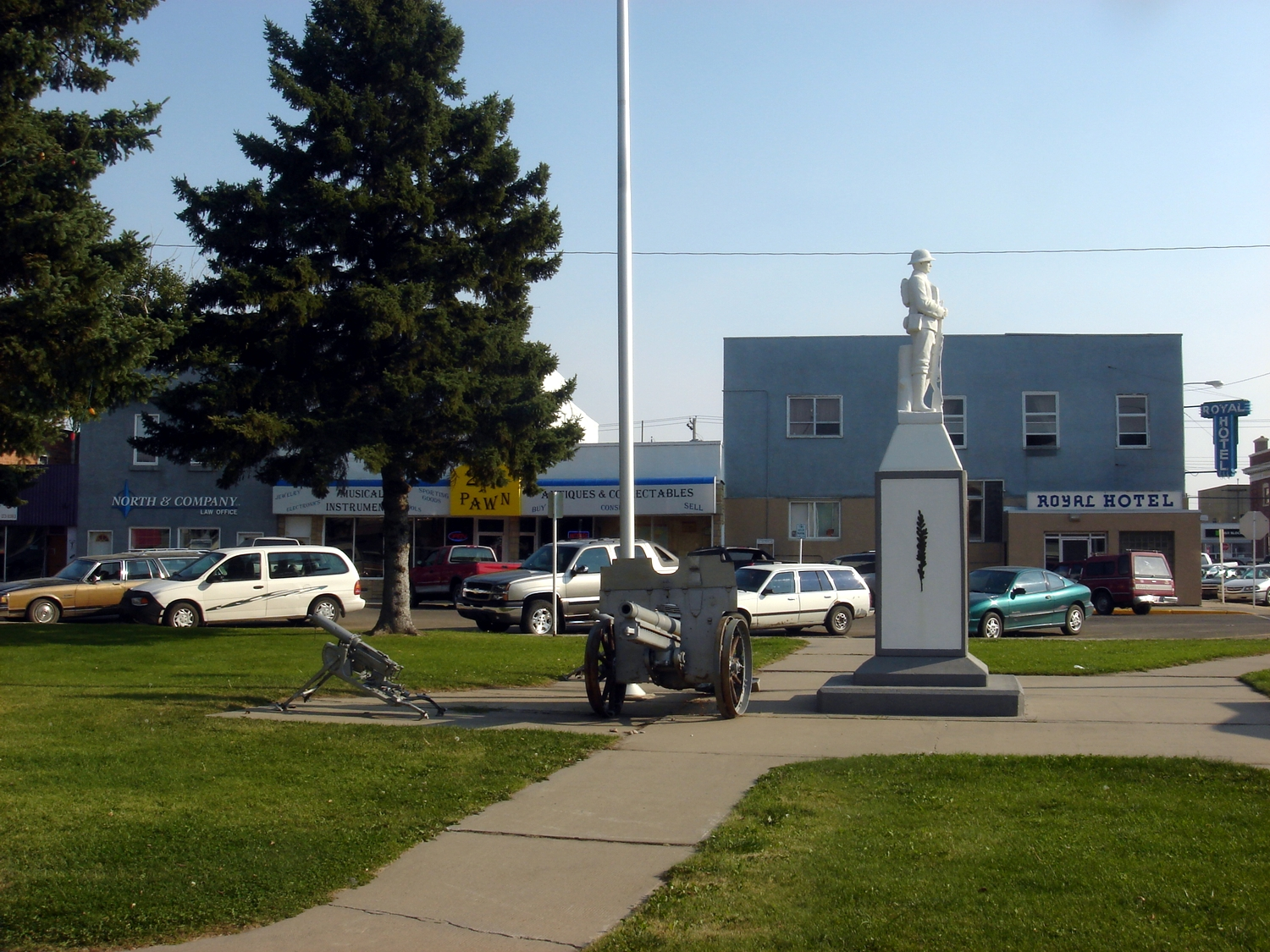
Cenotaph in downtown Taber

=== Cornfest ===
Cornfest is an annual summer festival held on the last full weekend in August, and includes a midway (rides, booths, and tests of skill) and a stage with performers. It is the largest free family festival in Western Canada, and is organized by the Taber and District Chamber of Commerce. There are a number of corn-based activities, such as corn tasting and stuffing. Corn stuffing involves two people, one wearing an oversized coverall. One of the contestants attempts to stuff as much corn as possible into the other's coverall. Whichever team can put the most corn in the coveralls in the allotted time wins. During Cornfest, large-scale, local corn producers enter their best varieties in the 'Best Corn of the Year' award.

Taber is home to one of the Canada 150 Mosaic murals. It depicts Tank 77 within a field of corn, and the tiles were painted by members of the community. The mural was unveiled in December 2016, and is housed within the Taber Health Clinic.

== Government ==
Taber federal election results
Year	Liberal		Conservative		New Democratic		Green	
2021	4%	151	70%	2,738	8%	319	0%	0
2019	3%	121	89%	3,842	4%	188	1%	47

Taber provincial election results
Year	United Cons.		New Democratic	
2019	79%	2,588	12%	387
2015	41%	8,681	20%	525

The Town of Taber gained notoriety when it adopted a bylaw on February 23, 2015, that granted the police and bylaw officials the authority to levy fines for controversial actions including swearing, public assembly, spitting and applying graffiti on one's own private property. The bylaw also implemented a curfew. The adoption met criticism over its appearance of being unconstitutional; violating freedoms of expression and association protected under Section Two of the Canadian Charter of Rights and Freedoms. The town defended its adoption stating the bylaw "is intended to consolidate existing municipal regulations and allow enforcement under a municipal bylaw rather than the Criminal Code" and citing concerns about unnecessary prosecutions clogging the court. Mayor Henk De Vlieger supported the bylaw while stating that town council would review the bylaw after a six-month trial.

=== Taber Police Service ===
Taber Police Service

Agency overview
- Formed: 1904

Jurisdictional structure
- Legal jurisdiction: Municipal

Operational structure
- Sworn members: 19
- Elected officer responsible: The Honourable Mickey Amery, Minister of Justice and Solicitor General
- Agency executive: Graham Abela, chief of police

Website
- www.taber.ca/town-services/taber-police-service

The Taber Police Service (TPS) is the municipal police force for the Town of Taber. Graham Abela is the current chief of police. The TPS was established in 1904. As of 2023, TPS had 19 serving officers.

== Education ==
Kindergarten through grade 12 education is administered in Taber by the Horizon School Division and Holy Spirit Roman Catholic Division. The two high schools in Taber are W.R. Myers High School and St. Mary's School. Taber has a Christian School for kindergarten through grade 9. Other education systems include Community Adult Learning Council, ACE Place Learning Center and a Career Resource Centre.

== Sister cities ==
Taber and Higashiomi are sister towns. In 1981, the Town of Taber and Notogawa, Japan signed the original Twinned Municipalities Agreement. When Notogawa was merged into the City of Higashiomi in 2006, the two municipalities re-signed the Twinning Agreement.

== Notable people ==
- Gavin Crawford, actor and comedian (This Hour Has 22 Minutes)
- Brandon Davidson, professional ice hockey player
- Sally Ito, writer
- Sharon Kinne, international fugitive from justice and suspected serial killer, who lived in Taber under an assumed name from 1973 to her death in 2022
- Martine Leavitt, award winning writer and professor
- Ron Lloyd, Commander Royal Canadian Navy 2016-2019
- Corb Lund, Musician
- Johnny Longden, jockey and horse trainer
- Rob Miyashiro, MLA for Lethbridge-West 2024–present
- Devin Setoguchi, professional ice hockey player
- Kenneth B. Storey, biology professor at Carleton University, among the top 2% of highly cited scientists in the world.

== See also ==
- List of communities in Alberta
- List of towns in Alberta
