= Alberta Highway 46 =

Highway in Alberta, Canada

Route information
- Length: 152 km (94 mi)
- Existed: 1950s–c. 1977

Major junctions
- South end: Highway 28 near Radway
- Highway 63 near Atmore
- North end: Highway 36 in Lac La Biche

Location
- Country: Canada
- Province: Alberta
- Specialized and rural municipalities: Thorhild, Athabasca, Lac La Biche
- Towns: Lac La Biche

Highway system
- Alberta Numbered Highway Network; List; Former
← Highway 45	→ Highway 47

Alberta Provincial Highway No. 46, commonly referred to as Highway 46, was a highway in north-central Alberta, Canada connecting Edmonton to Lac La Biche. It existed between the 1950s and 1970s, and has formed portions of Highways 55 and 63 since the late 1970s.

== Route description ==
Highway 46 began at Highway 28 west of Radway and travelled north through Boyle. North of Boyle, Highway 46 turned east through Grassland and Atmore, ending in Lac La Biche.

== History ==
A portion of the gravel road that later became Highway 46 had been constructed by the late 1930s. Construction of Highway 63 between Atmore and Fort McMurray began in 1962. In the late-1970s, in conjunction with new highways being constructed between Athabasca and Boyle as well as between Lac La Biche and Cold Lake, the 30 km (19 mi) east-west section between Atmore and Lac La Biche was renumbered to Highway 55. The 89 km (55 mi) north-south section between Radway and Boyle became part of Highway 63, while a 23 km (14 mi) concurrency with Highways 55 & 63 was established between Boyle and Atmore.

Replacement highways

Current Number	Length (km)	Length (mi)	Southern terminus	Northern terminus	Notes
Highway 63	89	55	Hwy 28 near Radway	Former Highway 664 at Donatville	Hwy 664 replaced by Highway 55.
Highway 55 / Highway 63	23	14	Former Highway 664 at Donatville	Highway 63 at Atmore	
Highway 55	40	25	Highway 63 at Atmore	Hwy 36 in Lac La Biche	Highway 55 continues east.
Concurrency
