= Alberta Highway 55 =

Highway in Alberta

Highway 55
- Northern Woods and Water Route
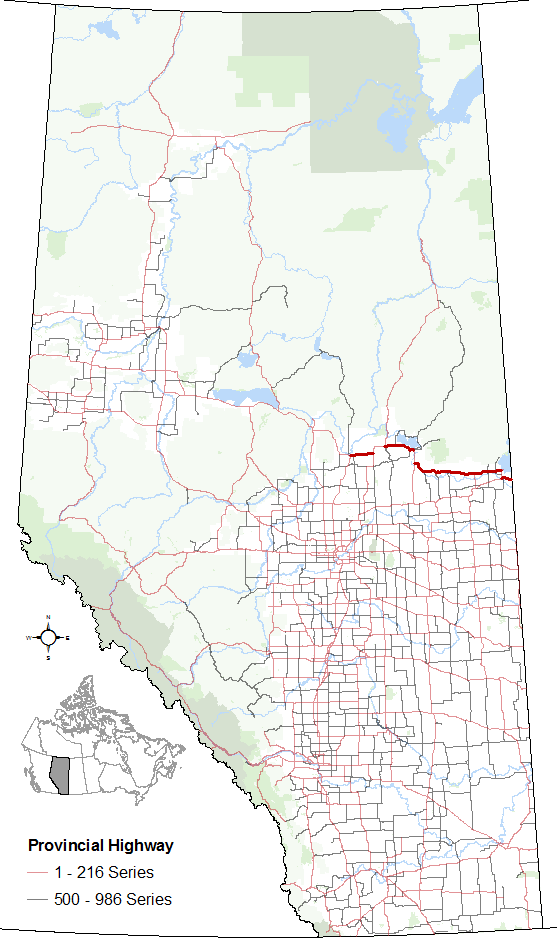

Route information
- Maintained by the Ministry of Transportation and Economic Corridors
- Length: 263 km (163 mi)

Major junctions
- West end: Highway 2 in Athabasca
- Highway 63 near Atmore; Highway 36 near Lac La Biche; Highway 41 in La Corey; Highway 28 in Cold Lake
- East end: Highway 55 at Saskatchewan border near Cherry Grove

Location
- Country: Canada
- Province: Alberta
- Specialized and rural municipalities: Athabasca County, Lac La Biche County, Bonnyville No. 87 M.D.
- Major cities: Cold Lake
- Towns: Athabasca

Highway system
- Alberta Numbered Highway Network; List; Former
← Highway 54	→ Highway 56

Alberta Provincial Highway No. 55, commonly referred to as Highway 55, is a 263-kilometre (163 mi) long east–west highway in northeast Alberta, Canada. It extends from the Saskatchewan border in the east through the Cold Lake, Lac La Biche, and Athabasca where it ends at Highway 2. In Saskatchewan, it continues as Saskatchewan Highway 55.

The entire length of Highway 55 comprises the easternmost segment of Alberta's portion of the Northern Woods and Water Route (NWWR). West of Athabasca, the Northern Woods and Water Route continues westward along Highway 2 and then Highway 49.

== History ==
The original designation Highway 55 was a 15-kilometre (9 mi) long north–south highway that appeared on maps in the mid-1950s and connected Fort Saskatchewan with Highway 16, just east of Edmonton. In 1973, Alberta established its secondary highway system along mostly existing unimproved roads, with Secondary Highway 662 running between Highway 36 and Cold Lake, and Secondary Highway 664 running between Athabasca and Donatville.

The idea of a northern highway corridor between Dawson Creek, British Columbia and Winnipeg, Manitoba was originally lobbied by George Stevenson, a retired CN employee who lived in McLennan, Alberta. The communities along the proposed corridor supported his idea and eventually resulted in the incorporation of the Northern Woods and Water Route Association in the western provinces 1974. As part of establishing the corridor in northeastern Alberta, two secondary highways (662 and 664), along with Highway 28X and a portion of Highway 46 were renumbered to Highway 55 in c. 1977, matching Saskatchewan Highway 55, while the original route east of Edmonton became part of Highway 21. Highway 55 was paved throughout the 1980s.

Former Highways

Former Number	Length (km)	Length (mi)	Western terminus	Eastern terminus	Notes
Highway 664	32	20	Highway 2 in Athabasca	Former Highway 46 at Donatville	
Highway 46	63	39	Former Highway 664 at Donatville	Highway 36 in Lac La Biche	Highway 46 south of Atmore replaced by Highway 63; 23 km (14 mi) concurrency Highway 63.
Highway 36	20	12	Former Highway 46 in Lac La Biche	Former Highway 662 south of Lac La Biche	Concurrency remains.
Highway 662	125	78	Highway 36 south of Lac La Biche	Highway 28 in Cold Lake	
Highway 28	10	6	Highway 28 in Cold Lake	Former Highway 28X south of Cold Lake	Concurrency remains.
Highway 28X	13	8	Highway 28 south of Cold Lake	Saskatchewan border	
Concurrency

== Major intersections ==
From west to east:

Rural/specialized municipality	Location	km	mi	Destinations	Notes
Athabasca		0.0	0.0	Highway 2 (50 Avenue / 50 Street) – Slave Lake, Peace River, Edmonton	Northern Woods and Water Route follows Highway 2 north
Athabasca		0.5	0.31	Highway 813 north – Calling Lake, Wabasca	
Athabasca County		5.2	3.2	Highway 827 south – Thorhild	
Athabasca County	Donatville	31.5	19.6	Highway 63 south – Boyle, Edmonton	West end of Highway 63 concurrency
Athabasca County	Grassland	47.0	29.2		Passes through Grassland
Athabasca County	Atmore	54.3	33.7	Highway 63 north – Wandering River, Fort McMurray; Highway 855 south	East end of Highway 63 concurrency
Lac La Biche County		69.0	42.9	Highway 858 north – Plamondon	
Lac La Biche County		90.5	56.2	Highway 663 south – Hylo, Boyle	
Lac La Biche County	Lac La Biche	94.0	58.4	101 Avenue	Former Highway 55 alignment; west end of Lac La Biche bypass
Lac La Biche County	Lac La Biche	95.9	59.6	Highway 36 begins / 100 Street Highway 881 north – Conklin, Fort McMurray	Former Highway 55 alignment; east end of Lac La Biche bypass; west end of Highway 36 concurrency
Lac La Biche County		113.7	70.6	Highway 36 south – Ashmont, Two Hills	East end of Highway 36 concurrency
Lac La Biche County		131.1	81.5	Highway 866 south – McRae, Spedden	
Lac La Biche County		143.3	89.0	UAR 225 south – Rich Lake	
Lac La Biche County		147.7	91.8	Highway 867 south	
M.D. of Bonnyville No. 87		165.5	102.8	Highway 881 south – Therien, St. Paul	
M.D. of Bonnyville No. 87	La Corey	202.2	125.6	Highway 41 south – Bonnyville	
M.D. of Bonnyville No. 87		220.8	137.2	Highway 892 – Ardmore	Former Highway 92 north
M.D. of Bonnyville No. 87		230.6	143.3	Highway 897 – Cold Lake Provincial Park, CFB Cold Lake	
City of Cold Lake		239.0	148.5	Highway 28 east (8 Avenue) 16 Avenue – Cold Lake Provincial Park	North end of Highway 28 wrong-way concurrency
City of Cold Lake		244.0	151.6	50 Avenue / Centre Avenue – CFB Cold Lake	Former Highway 897 west
M.D. of Bonnyville No. 87		249.1	154.8	Highway 28 west – Bonnyville, Edmonton	South end of Highway 28 wrong-way concurrency
M.D. of Bonnyville No. 87		249.9	155.3	Highway 897 south – Elizabeth Metis Settlement, Marwayne, Lloydminster	
M.D. of Bonnyville No. 87	Cherry Grove	257.5	160.0		
M.D. of Bonnyville No. 87		262.7	163.2	Highway 55 east (Northern Woods and Water Route) – Pierceland, Meadow Lake, Prince Albert	Continues into Saskatchewan
1.000 mi = 1.609 km; 1.000 km = 0.621 mi: Concurrency terminus
