= Alberta Highway 63 =

Highway in Alberta

Highway 63
- Highway 63 highlighted in red

Route information
- Maintained by the Ministry of Transportation and Economic Corridors
- Length: 433.910 km (269.619 mi)
- History: 1962 (construction begins) (Note: North of Highway 55.); 2006 (twinning announced) (Note: In 2006, Alberta committed to twinning Highway 63 from Fort McMurray to Highway 55. The last section was completed in 2016. The highway remains an undivided two-lane road from its south terminus to Highway 55 near Grassland, a distance of approximately 110 km (68 mi).) (Note: Primarily a Canadian term, "twinning" is the upgrading of a two-lane highway to a four-lane highway, with two lanes of traffic in each direction.); 2016 (twinning complete)

Major junctions
- South end: Highway 28 / Highway 829 near Radway
- Highway 18 near Thorhild; Highway 55 near Boyle; Highway 881 near Cheecham
- North end: 22 km (14 mi) north of Fort McKay

Location
- Country: Canada
- Province: Alberta
- Specialized and rural municipalities: Thorhild County, Athabasca County, Lac La Biche County, Regional Municipality of Wood Buffalo
- Major cities: Fort McMurray
- Villages: Boyle

Highway system
- Alberta Numbered Highway Network; List; Former
← Highway 62	→ Highway 64
National Highway System

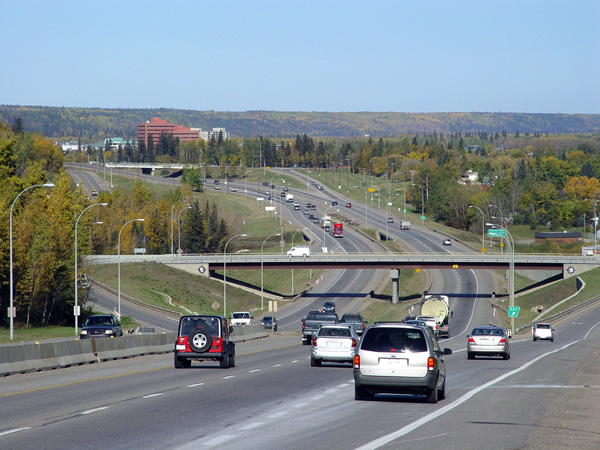
Highway 63 is the main route through Fort McMurray, seen here near Prairie Loop Blvd and the Hangingstone River crossing

Highway 63 is a 434-kilometre (270 mi) highway in northern Alberta, Canada that connects the Athabasca oil sands and Fort McMurray to Edmonton via Highway 28, forming the Northeast Alberta Trade Corridor. It begins as a two-lane road near the hamlet of Radway where it splits from Highway 28, running north through aspen parkland and farmland of north central Alberta. North of Boyle, it curves east to pass through the hamlet of Grassland and becomes divided west of Atmore where it again turns north, this time through heavy boreal forest and muskeg, particularly beyond Wandering River. Traffic levels significantly increase as Highway 63 bends through Fort McMurray, crossing the Athabasca River before connecting the city to the Syncrude and Suncor Energy plants further north. It ends approximately 16 km (10 mi) beyond a second crossing of the Athabasca River northeast of Fort McKay.

The southern segment of Highway 63 from Radway to Atmore was built before the mid-1950s and numbered as Highway 46 until the 1970s. Construction north of Atmore on the first road connecting Fort McMurray to the rest of the Alberta highway system began in 1962. Upgrades in the following decades saw the two-lane highway widened and improved with the addition of passing lanes, and extended to its present terminus northeast of Fort McKay. Since 2004, the highway has formed the majority of the National Highway System core route between Fort McMurray and Edmonton, and in 2016 played a key role in the evacuation of over 80,000 people from Fort McMurray and the surrounding areas during a highly destructive wildfire.

Despite relatively low traffic volumes compared to other major highways in the province, the route has earned the moniker "Highway of Death" due to many fatal crashes. In 2006, Alberta committed to twinning the 240-kilometre (150 mi) stretch from Grassland to Fort McMurray, but progress was initially slower than anticipated due to muskeg and wildlife restrictions. After a particularly high-profile crash killed seven people, the province announced an accelerated timeline for the project in 2012 and all work was completed in 2016. Alberta has long-term plans to create a divided highway for the entire length of the Edmonton–Fort McMurray corridor by similarly upgrading the southernmost 110 kilometres (68 mi) of the highway, a portion of Highway 28, and the entirety of Highway 28A.

== Route ==
=== Thorhild and Athabasca Counties ===
Highway 63 begins as a two-lane rural highway approximately 70 km (43 mi) northeast of Edmonton in Thorhild County at an intersection with Highway 28, 6 km (3.7 mi) southwest of Radway. It splits to the north, first intersecting Highways 18 and 656 east of Thorhild, before continuing north through the hamlet of Abee after which it curves slightly to the northeast, paralleling a railway line. It proceeds on this northeasterly heading for less than 10 km (6 mi) before veering back north and intersecting Highway 661 in Newbrook. Highway 63 carries on through aspen parkland into Athabasca County past Ellscott to Highway 663 south of Flat Lake. It turns due east, concurrent with 663 for 8 km (5.0 mi) until the village of Boyle from which Highway 663 continues east past Skeleton Lake to Lac La Biche. Highway 63 carries on, curving back due north along the east shore of Flat Lake to its first intersection with Highway 55 south of the hamlet of Donatville. The two continue north concurrently, and beyond Skeleton Lake turns east through the hamlet of Grassland to an intersection at the southwest corner of Charron Lake near Atmore, marking the end of this second concurrency. Highway 55 continues east as an alternate route into Lac La Biche, and Highway 855 turns south to the town of Smoky Lake. Highway 63 turns north, becoming a divided highway soon thereafter.

Highway 63 continues through the aspen parkland of Athabasca County on a northeasterly heading, briefly following the northwest shore of Charron Lake before turning due north into the increasingly wooded terrain of northern Alberta. It crosses the La Biche River then parallels its east bank for the next 16 km (10 mi). 50 km (31 mi) north of Atmore the highway reaches the hamlet of Wandering River, the only significant community between Atmore and Fort McMurray. Highway 63 crosses Wandering River and runs north through boreal forest, intersected by only a few minor local roads until northbound and southbound rest areas that lie 40 km (25 mi) and 23 km (14 mi) north of Wandering River, respectively.

=== Lac La Biche County and Fort McMurray ===
After traversing the northern part of Lac La Biche County and entering the Regional Municipality of Wood Buffalo, Highway 63 reaches an intersection with Highway 881 west of Anzac, nearly 180 km (110 mi) north of Wandering River. The highway veers slightly northwest, paralleling the Hangingstone River for the remaining 16 km (9.9 mi) of its journey to an access for Fort McMurray International Airport at Airport Road (formerly Highway 69), and the southern limit of Fort McMurray. In Fort McMurray, Highway 63 continues as a divided expressway along the east bank of the Hangingstone River through the communities of Gregoire and Beacon Hill. It then adopts the name Memorial Drive, curving slightly east and then back north before descending to cross the river after a diamond interchange at Prairie Loop Boulevard. Climbing from the Hangingstone River, a second diamond interchange at Hospital Street follows as the four lanes of Highway 63 bypass downtown Fort McMurray to the west, separating it from the neighbourhoods of Hilltop Estates and Aspen Gardens. The highway then turns west to cross the Athabasca River on three bridges. The northernmost bridge, the Athabasca River Bridge, carries three through lanes and two lanes from Franklin Avenue that eventually merge into the main northbound lanes on the west side of the river. The Ralph Steinhauer Bridge is in the centre, carrying the three main eastbound lanes. The Grant MacEwan Bridge is the southernmost crossing; it carries two lanes of eastbound traffic exiting from Highway 63 to Franklin Avenue and C.A. Knight Way downtown. On the river's east bank, the two lanes from the MacEwan descend into a short tunnel under the northern bridges to reach Franklin Avenue.

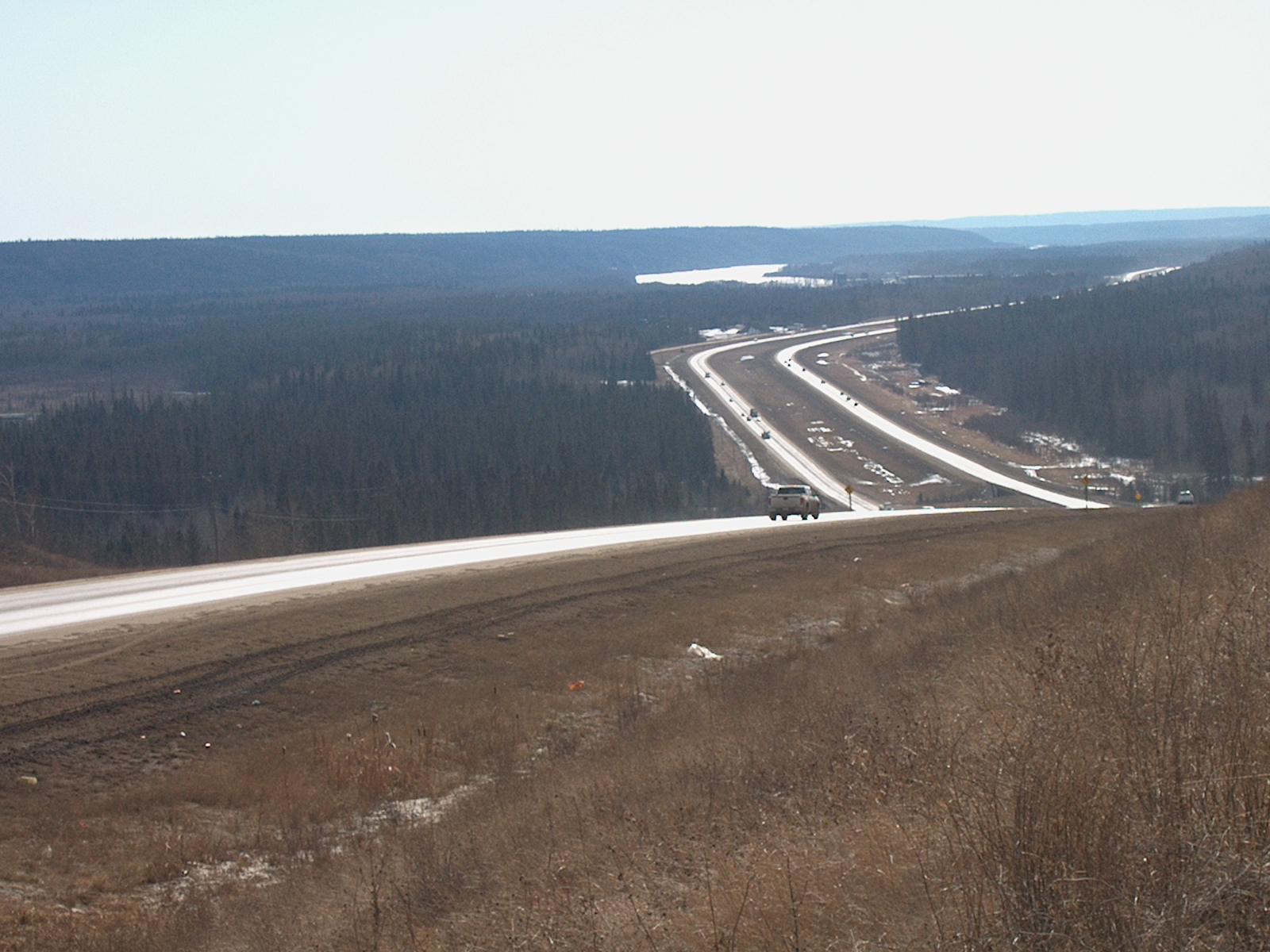
North of Fort McMurray, Highway 63 is a divided highway until it reaches the Athabasca River crossing south of Fort McKay

West of the river, Highway 63 and its brief collector-distributor system curve north to follow the Athabasca's west bank toward Fort McKay, passing the neighbourhood of Ross Haven en route to trumpet interchanges each at Thickwood Boulveard, Confederation Way, and Parsons Access Road, the last of which essentially marks the northern limit of Fort McMurray's residential development. The divided highway continues north alongside the river through boreal forest to Tar Island where it bends slightly northwest. The northbound and southbound lanes diverge as the highway passes between the Suncor Energy and Syncrude plants near Mildred Lake. The two carriageways then rejoin and the highway becomes undivided, but 10 km (6.2 mi) later a brief 2 km (1.2 mi) divided section precedes a second crossing of the Athabasca River on the Peter Lougheed Bridge. The Fort McKay Road splits to the north from the divided section prior to the river, providing access to the community of Fort McKay. East of the river, Highway 63 curves north along the east bank to a point approximately 22 km (14 mi) north of Fort McKay near the Fort MacKay/Albian Aerodrome, where the highway designation ends at an intersection with a dirt road.

=== Northern extensions ===
The unnamed local paved road continues for another 4 km (2.5 mi) before becoming gravel. In the winter months, it carries on north to Fort Chipewyan on the western shore of Lake Athabasca as a winter road through the Regional Municipality of Wood Buffalo, paralleling the Athabasca River. From there, the Fort Smith Winter Trail leads through Wood Buffalo National Park to Fort Smith, Northwest Territories, connecting to Northwest Territories Highway 5.

== Traffic ==
Divided for the majority of its length, traffic volumes on Highway 63 south of the Highway 881 junction near Fort McMurray remain relatively light despite the high number of fatal crashes. The volume is comparable to major two-lane highways in Alberta such as Highways 2A, 8, 22, 28, and 39. All are in the vicinity of 10,000 vehicles per day or more in rural areas, generally double the average of Highway 63. While Alberta has plans to twin at least a portion of most of these highways, no project has reached the construction stage nor been expedited like Highway 63. Until 2013, traffic levels had steadily increased on Highway 63, and an increasing number of trucks carrying large equipment caused traffic delays. Such loads often are wide enough to occupy two traffic lanes which impedes traffic in both directions, and as a result motorists have shared notice of super-wide loads on social media so that others could schedule their trips around them. The highway is the only route leading south out of Fort McMurray until its split with Highway 881, making it a critical link to Fort McMurray and the Athabasca oil sands. The economic importance of the area, the number of slow moving vehicles, and the absence of alternate routes are not generally reflected in annual traffic numbers, but were factors in the decision to expedite twinning of the highway.

Year-over-year, traffic decreased on Highway 63 in 2016 at most locations measured by Alberta Transportation compared to 2015. In Fort McMurray, traffic over the Athabascsa River decreased by nearly 12% in 2016 compared to 2015. In addition to the wildfire, Statistics Canada estimates that over 33,000 oil and gas related jobs were lost in Alberta from December 2014 to April 2016, likely reducing travel to and from Fort McMurray via Highway 63, and also on Highway 881 which has similarly decreased since 2013. Other 2016 estimates say more than 40,000 oilpatch jobs were lost since the end of 2014. Traffic levels increased again in 2017, nearly reaching 2015 levels over the Athabasca River in Fort McMurray, but trended downward again in 2018 and 2019.

Traffic volumes (2025)
Location	Volume
Radway	3,280
Atmore	3,970
Wandering River	4,300
Highway 881	7,120
Hospital St; Ft. McMurray	34,840
Athabasca River; Ft. McMurray	55,170
Fort McKay	5,900

=== Collisions ===
The road has earned the nickname "Highway of Death" due to a high number of fatal collisions. Between 2001 and 2005, over 1,000 crashes occurred on Highway 63 in which 25 people were killed and 257 others were injured. At least 149 people died between 1990 and 2012, 125 of which occurred on the 240-kilometre stretch between Grassland and Fort McMurray. The figure includes seven who died when two pickup trucks collided head-on near Wandering River on April 27, 2012. Days later, hundreds met at MacDonald Island Park in Fort McMurray to protest the slow pace of improvements to the highway. Many called for twinning of the highway to be expedited, with only 19 km (12 mi) of the province's original 240-kilometre commitment completed by May 2012. Some attendees carried signs adorned with the names of people who had died on the highway.

Regular users of the highway have suggested that poor driving is to blame for the majority of collisions, with impatient drivers making poor decisions. Shift work is common in the Fort McMurray and oil sands areas, and residents have suggested that such commuters are more likely to be travelling at unsafe speeds or under the influence of alcohol. Local MLA Mike Allen stated that he has seen drivers taking unnecessary risks every time he has driven on the highway. An Alberta Transportation spokeswoman in 2012 said that Highway 63's collision rate is below the provincial average for two-lane highways, though the metric does not account for the percentage of those collisions that are fatal. Alberta implemented aerial enforcement on multiple highways to catch speeders and reckless drivers in 2012, including Highway 63. The Coalition for a Safer 63 and 881 was created in an attempt to increase awareness and encourage safe driving on the highway and neighbouring Highway 881. Industry leaders in oil and gas are among the members of the group whose website offers driving tips and features an interactive map of the two highways, describing collisions that have occurred along both routes.

== History ==
=== Background ===
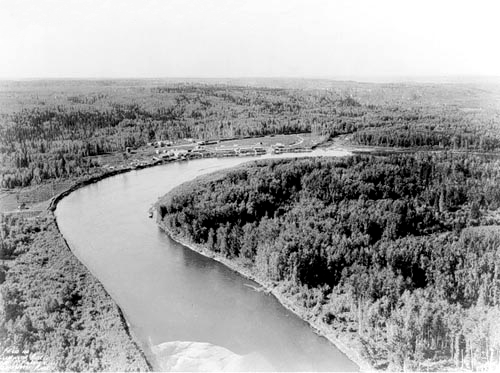
McMurray on the Athabasca River circa 1930, when its population was less than 1,000 and accessible only by the river or by rail.

Predicated on the rapid development of the Athabasca oil sands in the 1960s, construction of Highway 63 lagged decades behind the other major highways in Alberta that now form core routes of the National Highway System. By the 1930s, roads of varying quality had been constructed along the approximate alignments of present-day Highways 1, 2, 3, 4 and 16, all paralleling existing railways. Highway 63 was developed similarly, with construction of the Alberta and Great Waterways Railway (A&GW) completed by 1920. It connected Edmonton to Waterways (now a neighbourhood of Fort McMurray) via Lac La Biche, near the present-day alignment of Highway 881 and as many as 70 km (43 mi) east of the route that later became Highway 63 north of Boyle. Prior to the railway, a common route from Edmonton to McMurray was for one to first reach Athabasca by rail, then travel north along the Athabasca and House Rivers before portaging into McMurray.

The completed A&GW Railway made Edmonton trips more feasible, but the population of McMurray remained under 1,000 in the 1930s so a highway to the remote outpost through heavy muskeg and forest had not yet been deemed worthwhile. At this time, the only major road stretching into northern Alberta beyond Lac La Biche was Highway 2, which ran from Edmonton to Athabasca before turning west to Lesser Slave Lake and the Peace Country. A route splitting from Highway 2 at High Prairie leading to Grande Prairie and the British Columbia border had also been constructed, comprising a portion of present-day Highways 2A, 43, and 49. Additionally, a short segment of the Mackenzie Highway near Peace River was in place, as were portions of Highways 28, 29 and 36 from Mundare to Cold Lake via Brosseau and St. Paul.

=== Construction ===
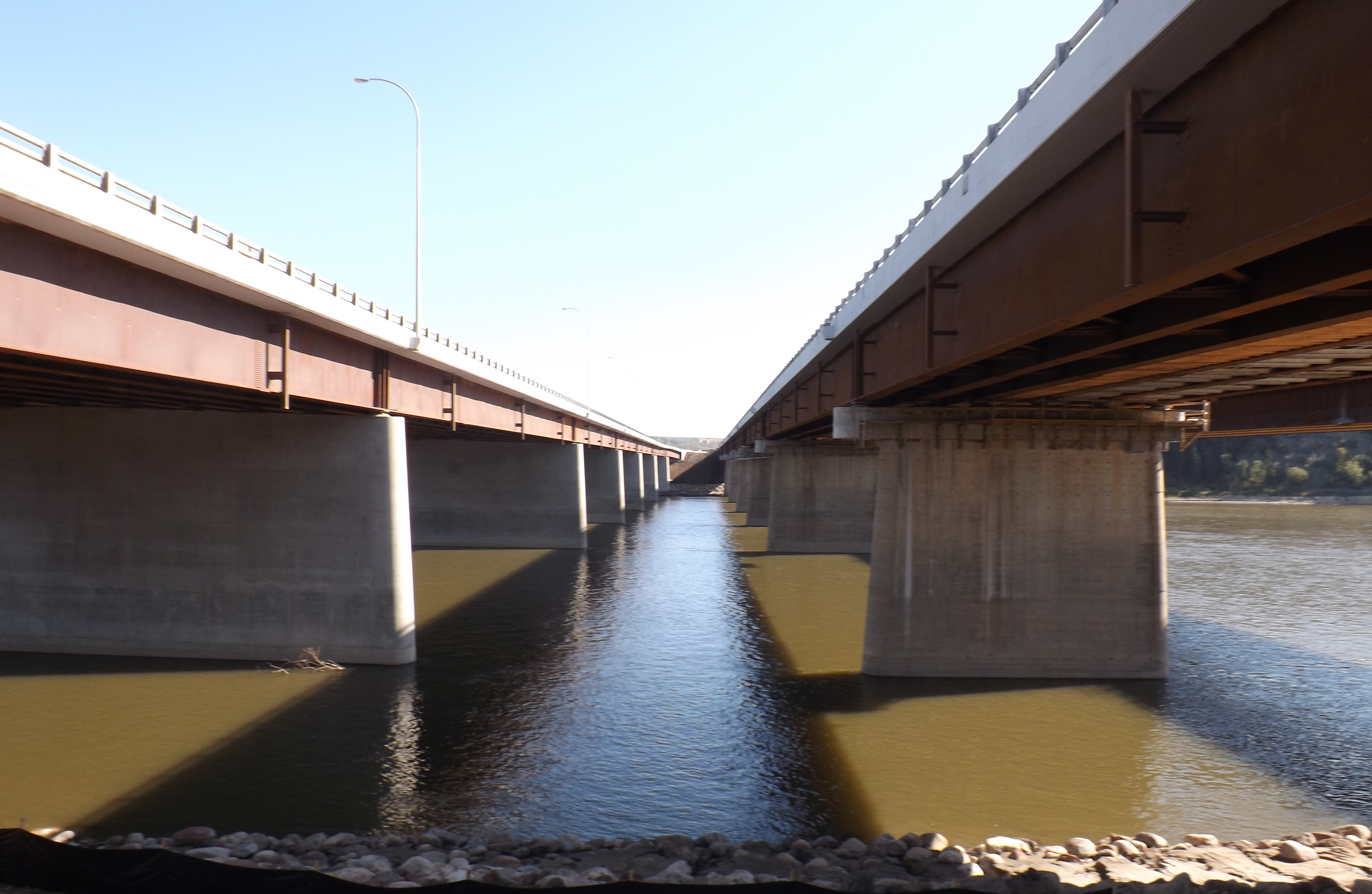
The Athabasca River Bridge and Steinhauer Bridge in Fort McMurray

By 1940, a portion of present-day Highway 63 from Boyle to Atmore had been constructed as an unsigned gravel road that formed part of the route from Athabasca to the western shore of Lac La Biche. By the mid-1950s, this section formed part of Highway 46 which ran from Township Road 590 (then Highway 28) near Radway to the hamlet of Lac La Biche along the present alignment of Highway 63 through Abee, Newbrook and Boyle. Highway 46 had been re-signed as Highways 55 and 63 by the end of the decade.

Until the 1960s, the only access to Fort McMurray was by air, rail, rugged path, or the Athabasca River. In 1957, the first car travelled between Fort McMurray and Edmonton, taking 18 hours to travel 744 kilometres (462 mi) via Wabasca and Slave Lake. Construction of the northern part of Highway 63 beyond Atmore began in 1962 and continued for several years, the first gravel road to connect Fort McMurray to the rest of Alberta's road network. The Grant MacEwan Bridge, a two-lane truss bridge across the Athabasca River, was completed in 1965. By the end of the decade, paving of the route was underway at a rate of 10 miles (16 km) per year. It continued into the next decade, with 60 miles (97 km) planned for 1974. In that year, $2.3 million of funding was approved for paving of the highway north of Wandering River, which resulted in an all-weather route from Edmonton to Fort McMurray. Alberta prioritized the project, resulting in delays to work on other projects. Paving work was completed by year's end, but a 1975 budget cut prevented widening of the highway, despite its high number of accidents.

The Ralph Steinhauer Bridge was completed in 1974 alongside the MacEwan, doubling capacity of the highway across the river. A two-lane bridge over the Hangingstone River in Fort McMurray was completed in 1977. In this year, work also began on a $2.57 million project at the south end of Fort McMurray in the vicinity of Hangingstone; it added a stretch of divided highway, southbound climbing lane, and grade levelling. A second bridge built to carry southbound traffic over the river was completed in 2003. North of Fort McMurray, the Peter Lougheed Bridge was built across the Athabasca in 1979. The 450-metre (1,480 ft) structure was initially dubbed the "Bridge to Nowhere" due to the lack of development on the river's east bank near Fort McKay.

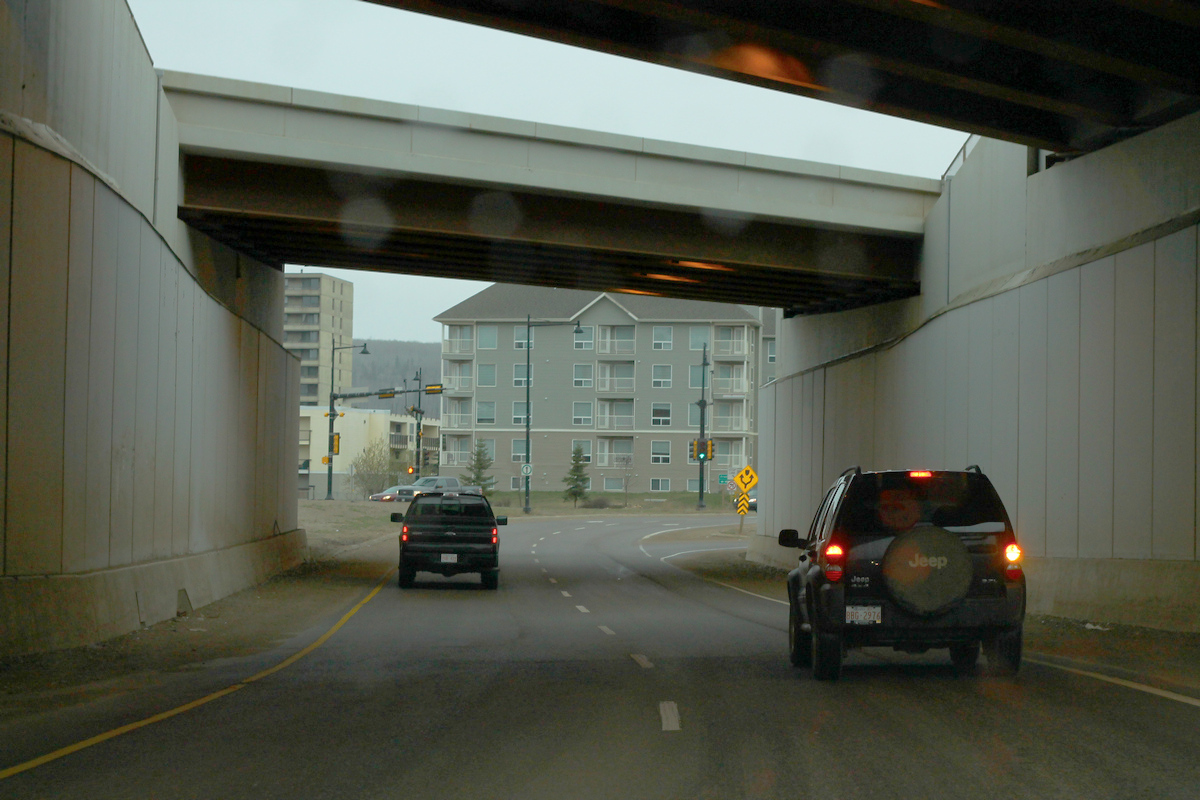
The Franklin Avenue Tunnel carries two lanes from the Grant MacEwan Bridge underneath Highway 63 and into downtown Fort McMurray.

After years of both public and political pressure, the provincial government announced in February 2006 that it would begin twinning the entire two-lane portion of the highway from Atmore to the south end of Fort McMurray, the stretch they deemed to be the most dangerous. Work began in 2006 and was estimated to take at least five years to complete. The first section was completed in 2008 at a cost of $53 million, stretching south from Airport Road (then Highway 69) to a point south of the Highway 881 intersection. The Mariana Lakes Country Store near Mariana Lake was closed in September 2008 to make way for the twinning. It was the only service station between Wandering River and Fort McMurray, but Alberta Transportation had no other options due to the proximity of the lake and utilities. The store's owner was reluctant to relinquish the property but acknowledged that upgrades to the dangerous highway were more important than the continued operation of the store. "The twinning of the highway is far more important, and there really is no other way for us to stay here," she stated. 46 km (29 mi) of tree clearing had been completed by February 2010, but further work was delayed until July to protect threatened caribou populations. An additional 17 km (11 mi) of grading near Wandering River was completed by fall 2011.

In October 2012, it was announced that work on the remaining portion of Highway 63 between Grassland and Fort McMurray would be accelerated, and completed by the end of 2016. On April 27, 2012, seven people were killed in a head-on collision south of Fort McMurray. The victims included a Fort McMurray pastor, his pregnant wife and two children. One child was orphaned. The Alberta government was faced with public outrage that the highway had not yet been twinned. At the time of the accident, 46 people had died in accidents on the highway since the 2006 announcement and only 19 kilometres had been twinned.

Premier Alison Redford appointed Fort McMurray-Wood Buffalo MLA Mike Allen as the special advisor to the Minister of Transportation for Highway 63 on May 22, 2012. Allen produced a report with more than 20 suggestions for reducing reckless driving on the highway on July 2, 2012. The report did not offer a precise timeline for converting the highway into a twinned highway, frustrating Mayor Melissa Blake and Shayne Saskiw, the Wildrose MLA for Lac La Biche. Alberta Transportation Minister Ric McIver said twinning the highway at the time would cost $50 million per year and take eight to 11 years if the province adopted a "pay-as-you-go" model.

But the Alberta government was able to shorten this timeline considerably. In October 2012, the Alberta government announced twinning 240 kilometres of Highway 63 would begin immediately and completed by the end of 2016.

On November 5, 36 km (22 mi) of twinned highway opened north of Wandering River and east of McMillan Lake, nine months ahead of schedule. Approximately half of the section was in Lac La Biche County while the other half was in Athabasca County. Interchanges in Fort McMurray at Confederation Way and Thickwood Boulveard were completed in late September 2013.

Highway 63 crossings of the Athabasca River in Fort McMurray
Bridge name	Carries	Total length		Longest span		Year
Bridge name	Carries	m	ft	m	ft	Year
Athabasca River	5 lanes westbound	472.0	1,548.6	76.0	249.3	2011
Ralph Steinhauer	3 lanes eastbound	472.6	1,551	76.2	250	2013
Grant MacEwan	2 lanes eastbound	455.9	1,496	76.2	250	2013

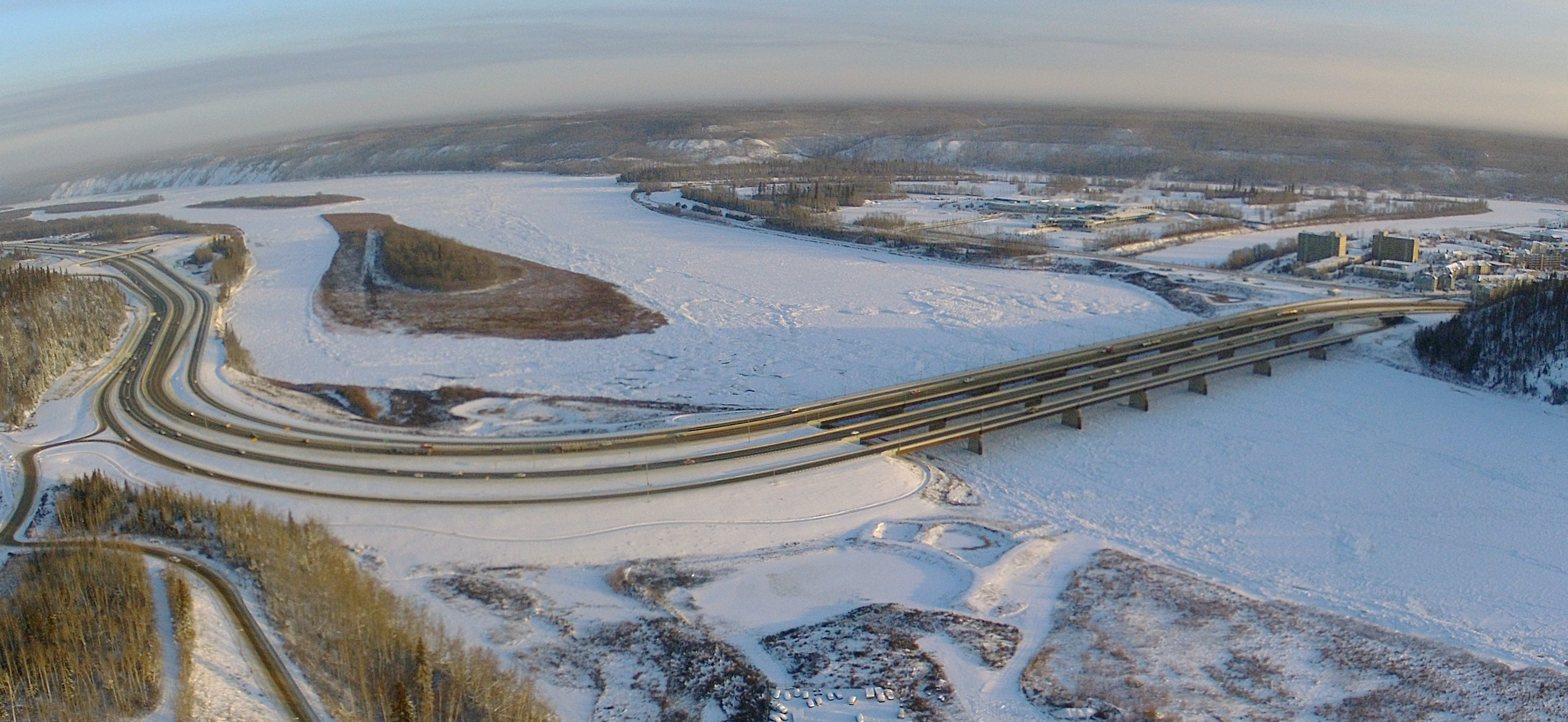
Three bridges carry ten total lanes of Highway 63 over the Athabasca River in Fort McMurray

To handle the quickly rising traffic levels in Fort McMurray after 2000, a new three bridge system was devised for the Athabasca River crossing, comprising significant reconstruction of the existing two bridges and a new third bridge. In 2008, work began on the "Athabasca River Bridge". The 472-metre (1,549 ft) bridge is seven spans, carrying five westbound lanes over the river on the largest bridge deck in Alberta. In 2011 the bridge was completed, and that same year modifications to the existing Steinhauer Bridge began. Built in 1974 to carry westbound traffic, the Steinhauer's two-lane bridge deck was reconstructed and widened to carry three eastbound lanes, with construction completed in 2013.

Extensive reconstruction of the Grant MacEwan Bridge was completed in December 2013, carrying two eastbound lanes over the river. Prior to this reconfiguration, the MacEwan's two lanes carried all eastbound traffic but upon completion of this project it would serve only as an exit ramp for south/eastbound traffic accessing downtown, while the repurposed Steinhauer Bridge carried the main eastbound through traffic. The reconstruction consisted of the demolition of the truss superstructure to make way for a modern girder design, while the existing piers were retained. The piers were slightly shortened with the new bridge deck built on top; the new lanes veer left at the end of the bridge and descend into a short tunnel passing underneath the main eastbound and westbound lanes of Highway 63, connecting to Franklin Avenue downtown. To access the bridge, southbound traffic exits the highway to the right several hundred meters before the river, immediately after Thickwood Boulevard. The two-lane ramp curves east alongside the main eastbound lanes and forms the two lanes of the MacEwan.

On July 24, 2015, a 32-kilometre (20 mi) section of twinned highway opened, approximately halfway between Mariana Lake and Highway 881. It was followed on August 17 by another 52 km (32 mi) entirely in Athabasca County. Late September saw the completion of 32 km (20 mi) in Lac La Biche County south of Mariana Lake, connecting at the south end to the 2012 Athabasca County twinning. On October 15, a 34-kilometre (21 mi) section immediately south of Highway 881 intersection was opened, connecting it to the 16 km north of the intersection that had been completed in 2008. It includes a single span bridge that carries northbound traffic over the Hangingstone River approximately 13 km (8 mi) south of Highway 881; southbound traffic travels over a culvert that was built during initial construction in 1965. An 8-kilometre (5.0 mi) section north of Mariana Lake also opened on October 15, and two days later an 11-kilometre (6.8 mi) stretch at the southern end of the project was finished, beginning at the intersection with Highway 55 near Atmore. On October 19, another 16 km (10 mi) north of Mariana Lake was completed, leaving only 3 km (2 mi) in Lac La Biche County which opened the following year on May 26, 2016.

=== 2016 wildfire ===
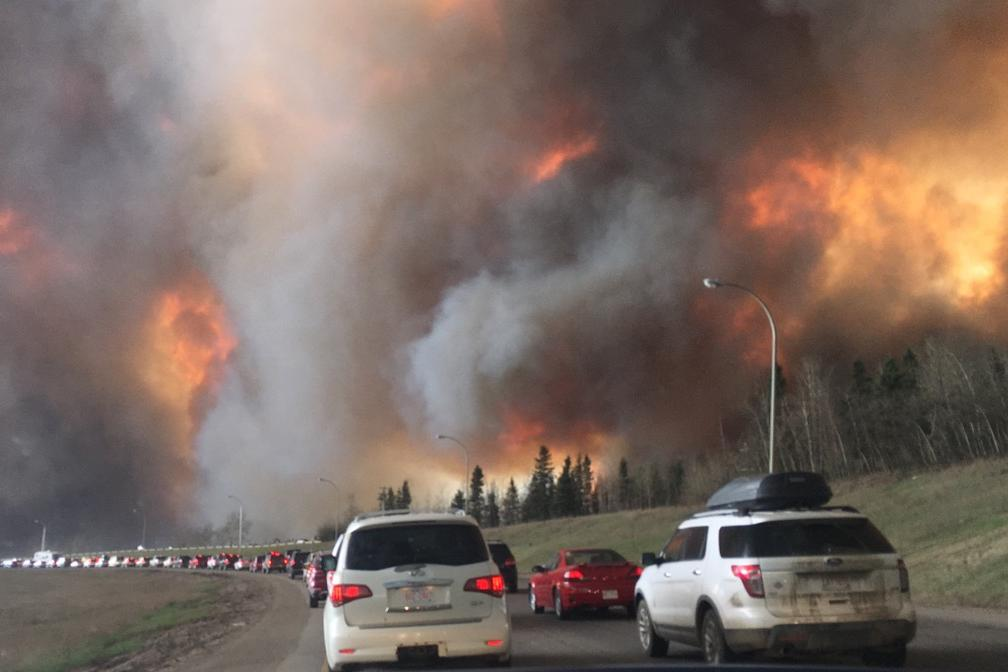
With twinning 99% complete between Grassland and Fort McMurray by the end of 2015, Highway 63 played a crucial role in the evacuation of over 80,000 residents from the Fort McMurray area in May 2016

In early May 2016, a wildfire encroached on Fort McMurray and surrounding areas, causing a complete evacuation of nearly 90,000 people and over $3 billion in damage. With twinning of Highway 63 from Fort McMurray to Grassland fully complete by the end of 2015 with the exception of a 3 km section near Wandering River, the upgraded highway was instrumental in the evacuation of Fort McMurray as it is the only route out of the community to the south. In June, police and firefighters welcomed residents back into Fort McMurray by waving from the King Street overpass as drivers entered the city on Highway 63. In October 2016, Premier Rachel Notley announced that the bridge would be renamed "Responders Way", and signs were unveiled at a ceremony on March 10, 2017.

Reviews of the evacuation procedures during the fire showed that Highway 63 performed well in the evacuation, but would be best supplemented by another road. In late October 2016, the Regional Municipality of Wood Buffalo council unanimously voted in support of a second highway that would serve as an alternate evacuation route, tentatively called the East Clearwater Highway. It would run east of Fort McMurray as an extension of Highway 881 near Anzac, crossing the Clearwater River and connecting to a proposed segment of Highway 686 before continuing north. The project is estimated to cost $1.5 billion, of which $5 million was committed by council in 2016 for pre-design work. The road would require provincial funding and the feasibility of its construction was assessed by Notley's government as part of a review of the wildfire evacuation process.

== Future ==
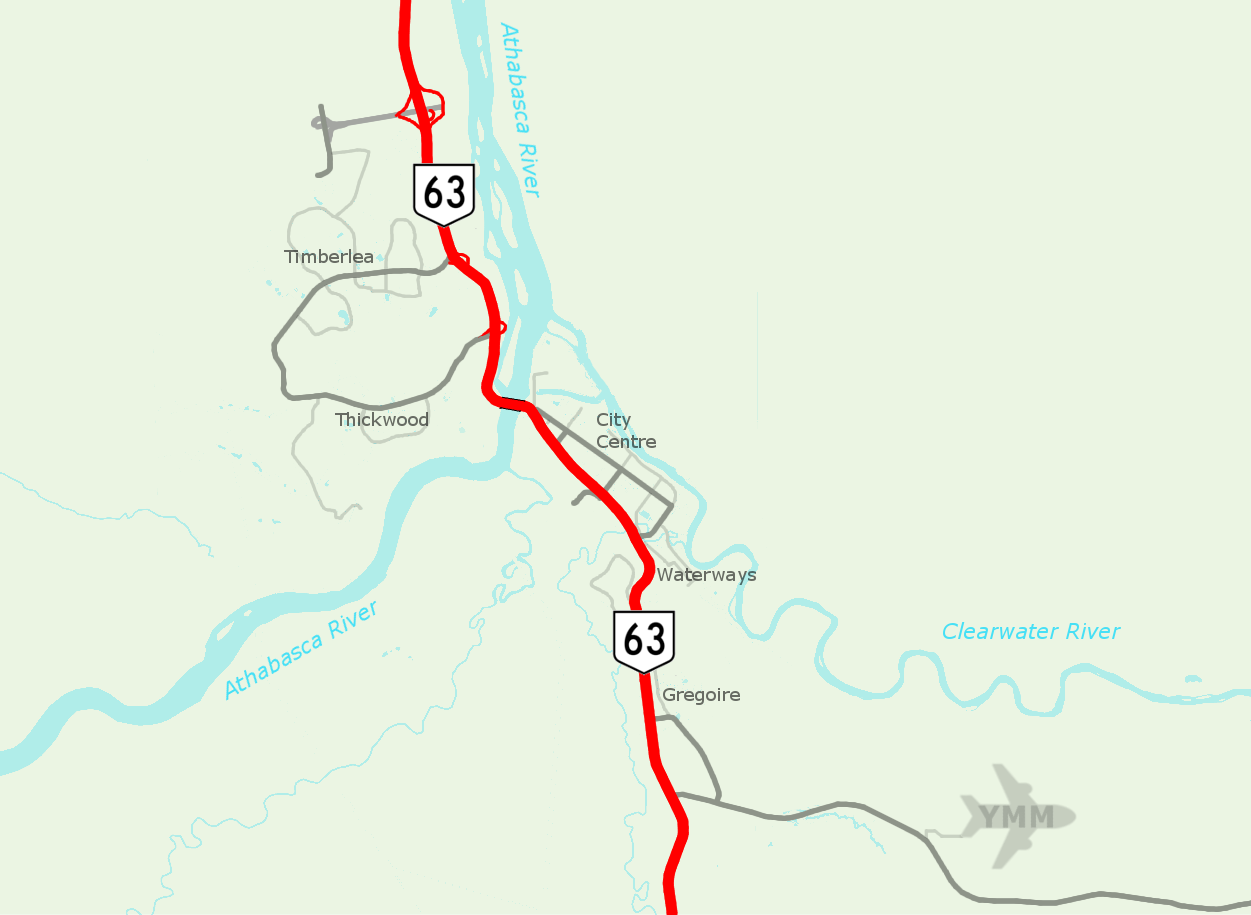
Highway 63 in Fort McMurray

Alberta has long-term plans to twin almost the entire length of Highway 63. A planning study will identify future interchange locations and a twinning plan for the approximately 20-kilometre (12 mi) stretch of the highway between Fort McMurray and the Peter Lougheed Bridge near Fort McKay that remains undivided. Like the majority of the corridor, this section will ultimately be a six-lane freeway. As of 2016, all newly twinned sections require second stage paving, and design work is underway.

A study completed in May 2014 assessed the potential alignment and right of way requirements for a twinned Highway 63 from Highway 28 to Ellscott, and a second study assessed the remainder from Ellscott to Highway 55. There are also plans to upgrade the southern portion of Highway 28 from near Gibbons to the Highway 63 split, and the entire length of Highway 28A, creating a fully divided highway from Edmonton to Fort McMurray. In Fort McMurray, a 2006 study recommended the construction of an interchange at Main Street as an expansion of the collector-distributor system.

== Major intersections ==
Rural/specialized municipality	Location	km	mi	Destinations	Notes
Thorhild County		0.0	0.0	Highway 829 south – Redwater Highway 28 – Cold Lake, Edmonton	Southern terminus
Thorhild County		12.8	8.0	Highway 18 west – Thorhild, Westlock; Highway 656 east	
Thorhild County	Newbrook	34.0	21.1	Highway 661 – Rochester	
Athabasca County		63.6	39.5	Highway 663 west – Colinton	Southern end of Highway 663 concurrency
Athabasca County	Boyle	72.0	44.7	Highway 663 east – Caslan	Northern end of Highway 663 concurrency
Athabasca County	Boyle	73.1	45.4	Highway 831 south – Long Lake Provincial Park, Waskatenau	
Athabasca County	Donatville	88.5	55.0	Highway 55 west – Athabasca	Southern end of Highway 55 concurrency
Athabasca County	Grassland	104.0	64.6		
Athabasca County	Atmore	111.6	69.3	Highway 55 east – Lac La Biche Highway 855 south	Northern end of Highway 55 concurrency
Athabasca County	Wandering River	156.6	97.3		
R.M. of Wood Buffalo	Mariana Lake	253.6	157.6		
R.M. of Wood Buffalo		335.7	208.6	Highway 881 south – Anzac, Conklin, Lac La Biche	
R.M. of Wood Buffalo	Fort McMurray	351.6	218.5	Saprae Creek Trail – Airport, Saprae Creek	Former Highway 69
R.M. of Wood Buffalo	Fort McMurray	353.3	219.5	MacKenzie Boulevard	
R.M. of Wood Buffalo	Fort McMurray	355.0	220.6	Beacon Hill Drive / Gregoire Drive	
R.M. of Wood Buffalo	Fort McMurray	357.3	222.0	Tolen Drive / King Street / Clearwater Drive	Interchange
R.M. of Wood Buffalo	Fort McMurray	358.4	222.7	Hospital Street / Abasand Drive	Interchange
R.M. of Wood Buffalo	Fort McMurray	359.4	223.3	Hardin Street	Traffic signals; southbound bypass lane
R.M. of Wood Buffalo	Fort McMurray	359.9	223.6	Morrison Street	Traffic signals; southbound bypass lane
R.M. of Wood Buffalo	Fort McMurray	360.4	223.9	Franklin Avenue	Interchange; southbound exit and northbound entrance
R.M. of Wood Buffalo	Fort McMurray	361.5	224.6	Crosses Athabasca River; Athabasca River Bridge (northbound); Ralph Steinhauer Bridge (southbound), Grant MacEwan Bridge (southbound Franklin Avenue exit)	
R.M. of Wood Buffalo	Fort McMurray	362.6	225.3	Thickwood Boulevard	Interchange
R.M. of Wood Buffalo	Fort McMurray	364.5	226.5	Confederation Way	Interchange
R.M. of Wood Buffalo	Fort McMurray	365.9	227.4	TaigaNova Crescent	
R.M. of Wood Buffalo	Fort McMurray	367.6	228.4	Highway 686 west (Parsons Access Road)	Interchange
R.M. of Wood Buffalo		388.4	241.3	Suncor Oil Sands	Interchange; access to Suncore oil sands facilities
R.M. of Wood Buffalo		395.9	246.0	Syncrude	Southbound right-in/right-out; access to Syncrude Mildred Lake oil sands facilities
R.M. of Wood Buffalo		398.6	247.7	Highway 63 south – Syncrude	Northbound exit only; northbound-to-southbound U-turn
R.M. of Wood Buffalo	Fort McKay	409.9	254.7	Fort McKay Road	
R.M. of Wood Buffalo		411.4	255.6	Crosses Athabasca River; Peter Lougheed Bridge (informally Bridge to Nowhere)	
R.M. of Wood Buffalo		433.9	269.6	Winter road – Fort Chipewyan, Wood Buffalo National Park, Fort Smith	Northern terminus; continues on season road
1.000 mi = 1.609 km; 1.000 km = 0.621 mi: Concurrency terminus; Incomplete access; Unopened
