= Mariana Lake, Alberta =

Unincorporated community in northern Alberta, Canada

Coordinates: 55°57′13″N 112°01′00″W

Location of Mariana Lake Alberta

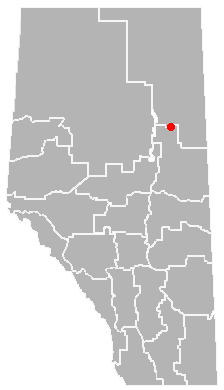
Location of Mariana Lake, Alberta

Mariana Lake is an unincorporated community in northern Alberta, Canada within the Regional Municipality of Wood Buffalo. it is on Highway 63, approximately 101 kilometres (63 mi) southwest of Fort McMurray.

A gas station, gift shop, and a convenience store (known as Mariana Lakes Country Store) used to exist in Mariana Lake. This business provided the only fuel, food, and washrooms between Wandering River and Fort McMurray along Highway 63. In September 2008, it was announced that the government of Alberta would be purchasing the land that the store was on to make way for the twinning of Highway 63. The store closed for the last time on September 30, 2008.

== Economy ==
Farming, some oil production employing the use of oil rigs.
