= Newbrook =

- Hamlet
- Location of Newbrook in Alberta
- Coordinates: 54.3297°N 112.9519°W
- Country: Canada
- Province: Alberta
- Census division: No. 13
- Municipal district: Thorhild County

Government
  - Type: Unincorporated
  - Governing body: Thorhild County Council

Area (2021)
  - Land: 0.52 km^{2} (0.20 sq mi)
- Elevation: 665 m (2,182 ft)

Population (2021)
  - Total: 63
  - Density: 120.9/km^{2} (313/sq mi)
- Time zone: UTC−06:00 (Alberta Time)

Newbrook is a hamlet in central Alberta, Canada within Thorhild County. It is located at the junction of Highway 63 and Highway 661, approximately 28 kilometres (17 mi) northeast of Thorhild and 36 kilometres (22 mi) south of Boyle. It has an elevation of 665 metres (2,182 ft).

The hamlet is located in Census Division No. 13 and in the federal riding of Westlock-St. Paul.

The hamlet and surrounding area has a strong Polish and Ukrainian influence, mostly from immigration at the turn of the 20th century. The former Newbrook Observatory, a meteor observatory that was the first facility in North America to photograph Sputnik 1, is located in the hamlet.

== Demographics ==
Population history of Newbrook
Year	Pop.	±%
1951	48	—
1956	191	+297.9%
1961	202	+5.8%
1966	151	−25.2%
1971	154	+2.0%
1976	80	−48.1%
1981	127	+58.7%
1986	100	−21.3%
1991	99	−1.0%
1991A	96	−3.0%
1996	101	+5.2%
2001	85	−15.8%
2006	116	+36.5%
2011	95	−18.1%
2016	92	−3.2%
2021	63	−31.5%
Source: Statistics Canada

In the 2021 Census of Population conducted by Statistics Canada, Newbrook had a population of 63 living in 32 of its 50 total private dwellings, a change of −31.5% from its 2016 population of 92. With a land area of 0.52 km^{2} (0.20 sq mi), it had a population density of 121.2/km^{2} (313.8/sq mi) in 2021.

As a designated place in the 2016 Census of Population conducted by Statistics Canada, Newbrook had a population of 92 living in 46 of its 52 total private dwellings, a change of −3.2% from its 2011 population of 95. With a land area of 0.52 km^{2} (0.20 sq mi), it had a population density of 176.9/km^{2} (458.2/sq mi) in 2016.

== See also ==
- List of communities in Alberta
- List of designated places in Alberta
- List of hamlets in Alberta
