= Indigenous Art Park =

Art park in Edmonton, Canada

ᐄᓃᐤ (ÎNÎW) River Lot 11∞
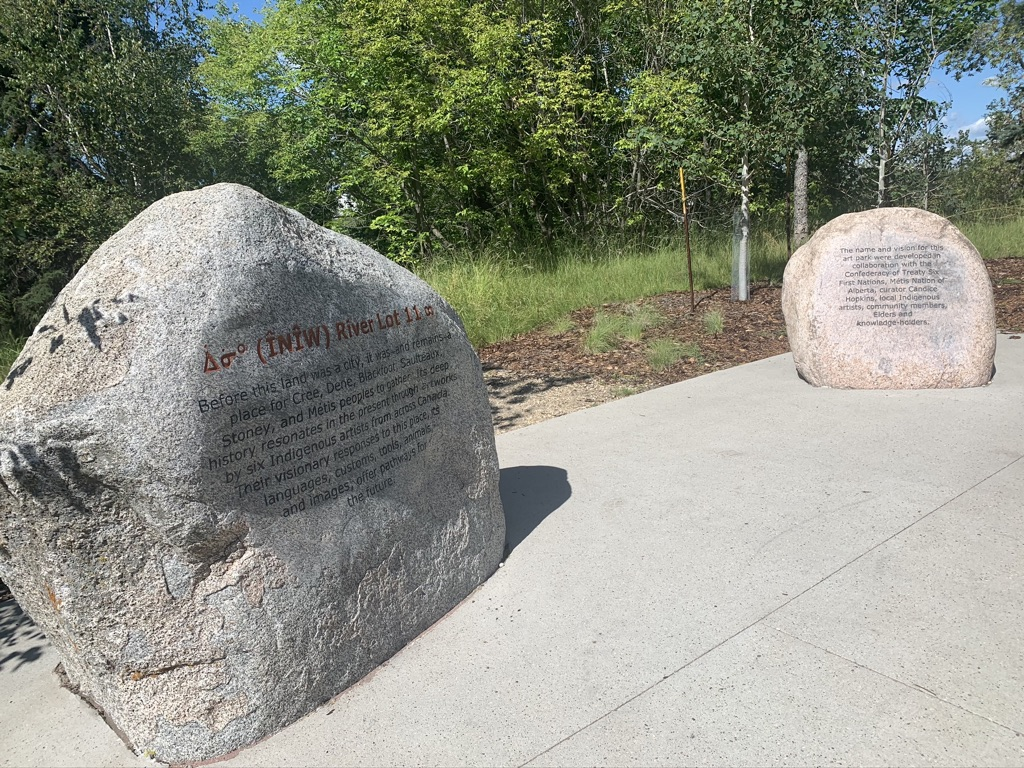
- Entry rocks at Indigenous Art Park
- Interactive map of ᐄᓃᐤ (ÎNÎW) River Lot 11∞
- Location: 10380 Queen Elizabeth Park Road, Edmonton
- Coordinates: 53°31′28″N 113°29′59″W
- Created: 2018
- Operator: City of Edmonton and Edmonton Arts Council
- Website: https://publicart.edmontonarts.ca/IAP/

Indigenous Art Park ᐄᓃᐤ (ÎNÎW) River Lot 11∞ (pronounced EE-nu River Lot 11) is a public park in Edmonton, Alberta's Queen Elizabeth Park in the North Saskatchewan River valley parks system built on the previous site of the Queen Elizabeth Pool. In June 2019, the Americans for the Arts' Public Art Network recognized the park as one of the 50 best international public art projects. Plans to build the park and curate installation pieces by Indigenous artists began in 2013, and the park opened in September 2018.

== Naming and creation ==
In Cree, ᐄᓃᐤ (ÎNÎW) means "I am of the Earth." The park was known as River Lot 11 when Métis landowner Joseph McDonald homesteaded on the site. In 2013, the City of Edmonton and Edmonton Arts Council began the process of visioning the art park concept with a workshop for local Indigenous communities and residents. In December 2014, City Council approved the funding for the park's creation and established a steering committee to lead the consultation, engagement, and administration of the project. The City of Edmonton also allocated $500,000 that it received through the Government of Canada's Canada 150 grants program to the project.

In August 2015, the Edmonton Arts Council put out an Expression of Interest call to Indigenous artists. Art Park curator Candice Hopkins guided 16 shortlisted artists through site visits and knowledge exchange with Indigenous communities and elders to immerse the artists in the cultures, histories, and stories of "this place". The shortlisted artists used this immersive experience to create designs and models for potential art installations, six of which were selected and unveiled in April 2016. Construction on the park began in 2017.

When the park reopened in 2018 as ᐄᓃᐤ (ÎNÎW), it featured six permanently installed artworks by Indigenous artists, as well as newly expanded trails, a covered seating area, and extra picnic tables scattered throughout.

== Featured artists ==
The art park was curated by Candice Hopkins of Carcross/Tagish First Nation, a well known artist who has worked as a curator at the National Gallery of Canada, Walter Phillips Gallery, and the Museum of Contemporary Native Art.

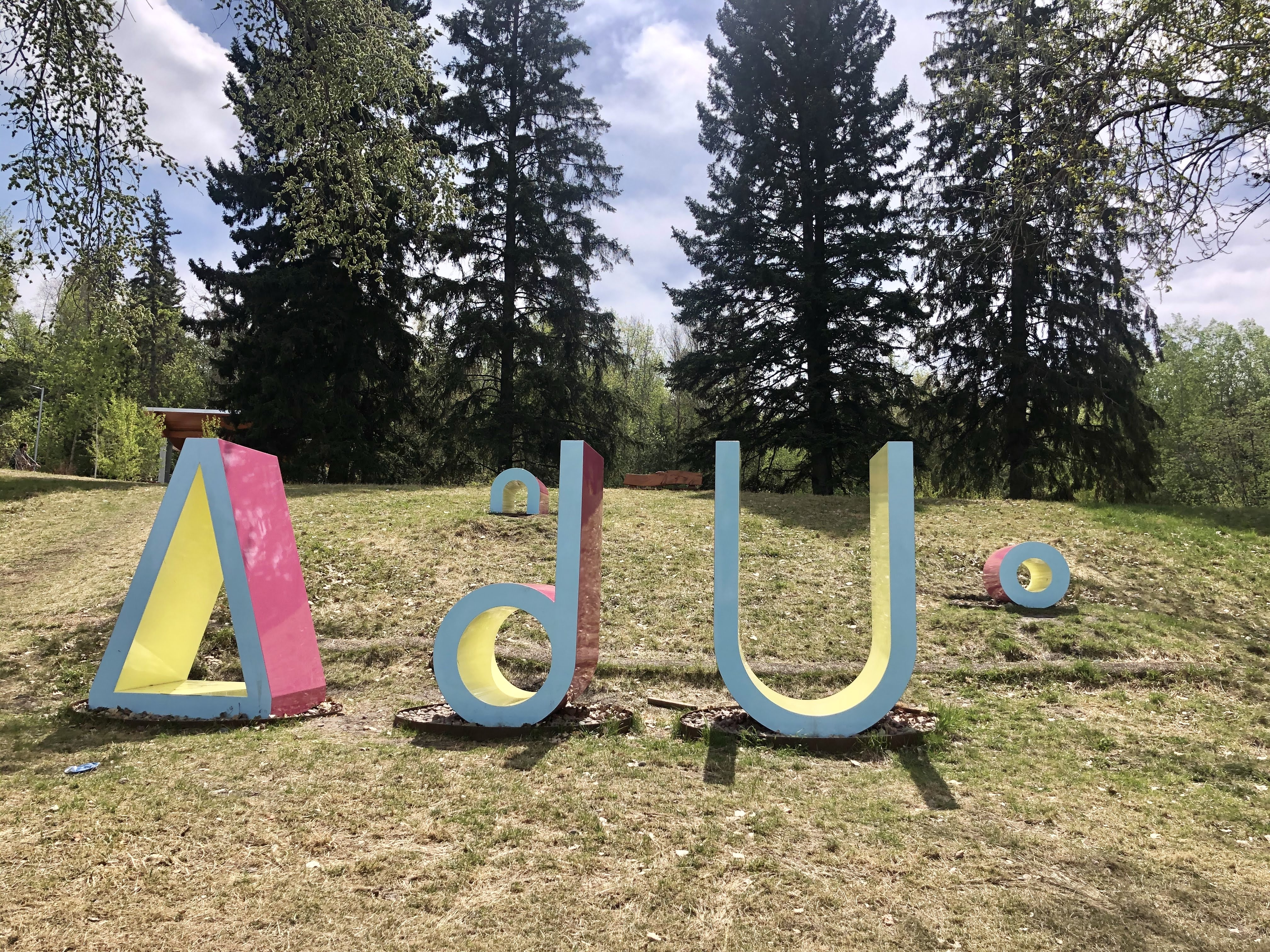
ᐃᐢᑯᑌᐤ (iskotew) by Amy Malbeuf.

=== 'ᐃᐢᑯᑌᐤ (iskotew)' - Amy Malbeuf ===
Amy Malbeuf, from Rich Lake, Alberta, is a Métis visual artist known for her work that examines notions of language, territory, nature and identity through a multidisciplinary approach. Her installation, ᐃᐢᑯᑌᐤ (iskotew), features sculptures of the Nehiyawewin syllabics for the word "fire". In her artist statement, Malbeuf notes that iskwew, the nehiyawewin word for woman, is derived from iskotew, indicating the sacredness of women's abilities and the unrecognized work that Indigenous women contributed to building this place.

The bright turquoise, pink, and yellow of the sculptures were inspired by the beadwork on a Métis fire bag that Malbeuf saw at the Royal Alberta Museum during her research for the project. Malbeuf wanted to use colours that would be striking on the landscape of the green and brown park as well as evoke the vibrancy of Indigenous language and culture.

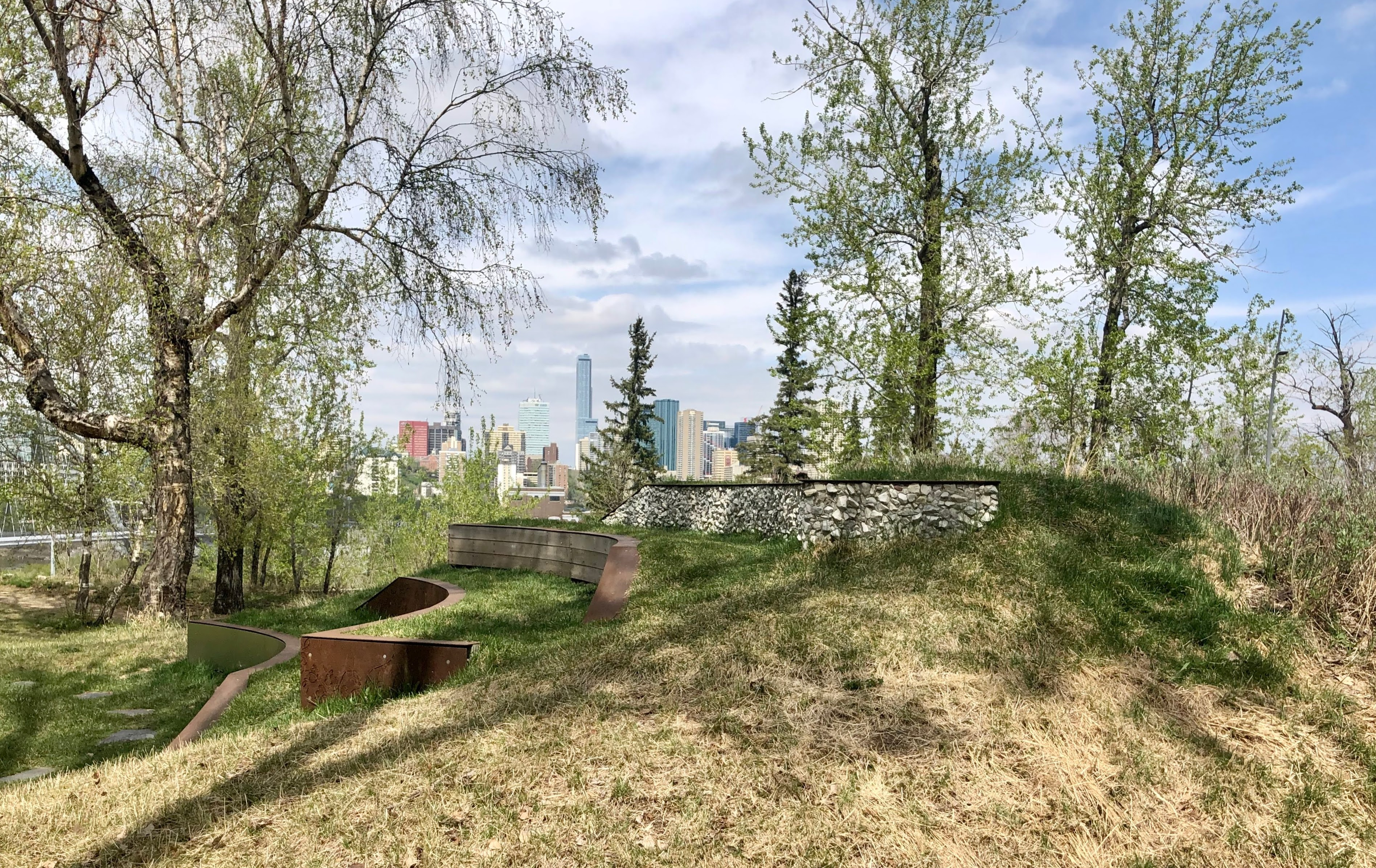
pehonan by Tiffany Shaw-Collinge.

=== pehonan - Tiffany Shaw-Collinge ===
Tiffany Shaw-Collinge is a Métis artist and architect based in Edmonton. Her work's title, pehonan, means "gathering or waiting place" in Cree, and the installation is an amphitheatre-style meeting place of tiered seating made of different materials. Shaw-Collinge conceptualized each of the four levels of the amphitheatre as a different time in the area's history.

The top level of the amphitheatre begins the timeline in the prehistoric era, and Shaw-Collinge used quartzite stones and rocks she gathered from the Bay of Fundy, where her ancestors lived. The second level continues the timeline to the era of fort trading in early Canada, and the wood used to create this level replicates the notched wood corners typical of a Métis log cabin. The third level from the top represents our current era of colonization and threats to Indigenous culture, using weathered steel to construct the seating. The steel, which features a beading pattern from Shaw-Collinge's grandmother's moccasin-making, will rust and decay over time, combining ideas of Indigenous resiliency and the damage created by European colonization. The bottom and fourth level of the amphitheatre represents looking to the future, and Shaw-Collinge used mirrored steel to construct this level both as a reflection for visitors and as a further nod to Indigenous ingenuity using materials to create within their environment.

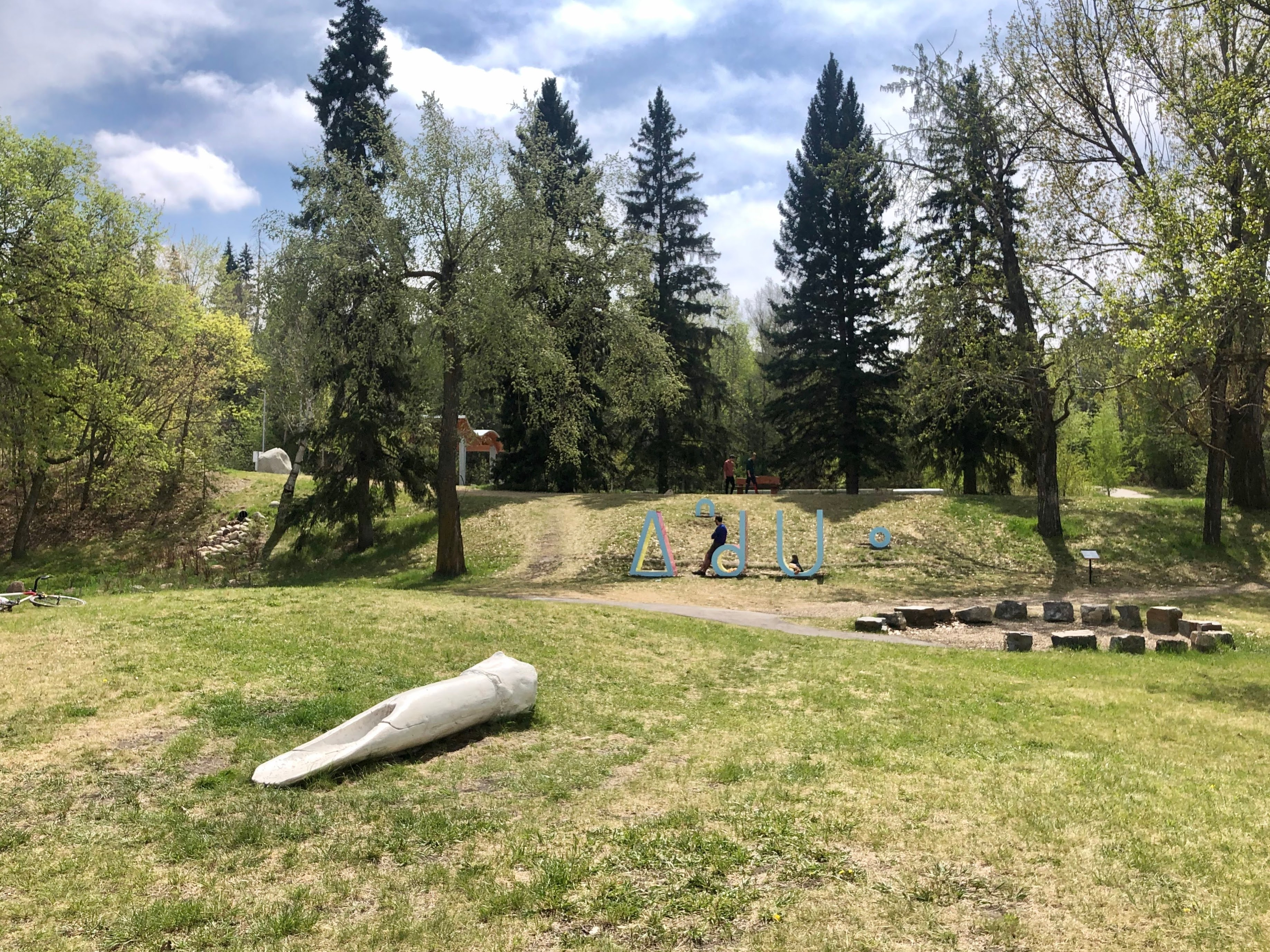
mikikwan by Duane Linklater

=== mikikwan - Duane Linklater ===
Duane Linklater is an Omaskêko Cree artist from Moose Cree First Nation in Ontario who specializes in sculpture, installation, and film. Linklater's installation is a large scale reproduction of a bone hide scraper, or mikikwan, that sits on a hillside in the art park. During his research for the project at the Royal Alberta Museum, Linklater looked at thousands of objects in the museum's collection and settled on using a 9,000-year-old buffalo bone hide scraper excavated in southern Alberta as the basis for his piece. Bone hide scrapers are an essential tool for turning animal hides into clothing, and for drums and rattles. Linklater chose the object to "memorialize the work of Indigenous women and the relation of that labour to the land," and to pay respect to the role that buffalo played in creating community in this place before their herds were destroyed by European settlers.

To create the installation, Linklater photographed the original artifact and worked with a fabrication studio in Calgary to create a concrete cast. The resulting piece is much larger than the original. In his artist statement, Linklater says: "With an increased scale and a new material in cast concrete, mikikwan, deliberately aligned with the new Walterdale Bridge, proposes this humble tool as a monument to the labor, practice and design of Indigenous people who still use this tool today."

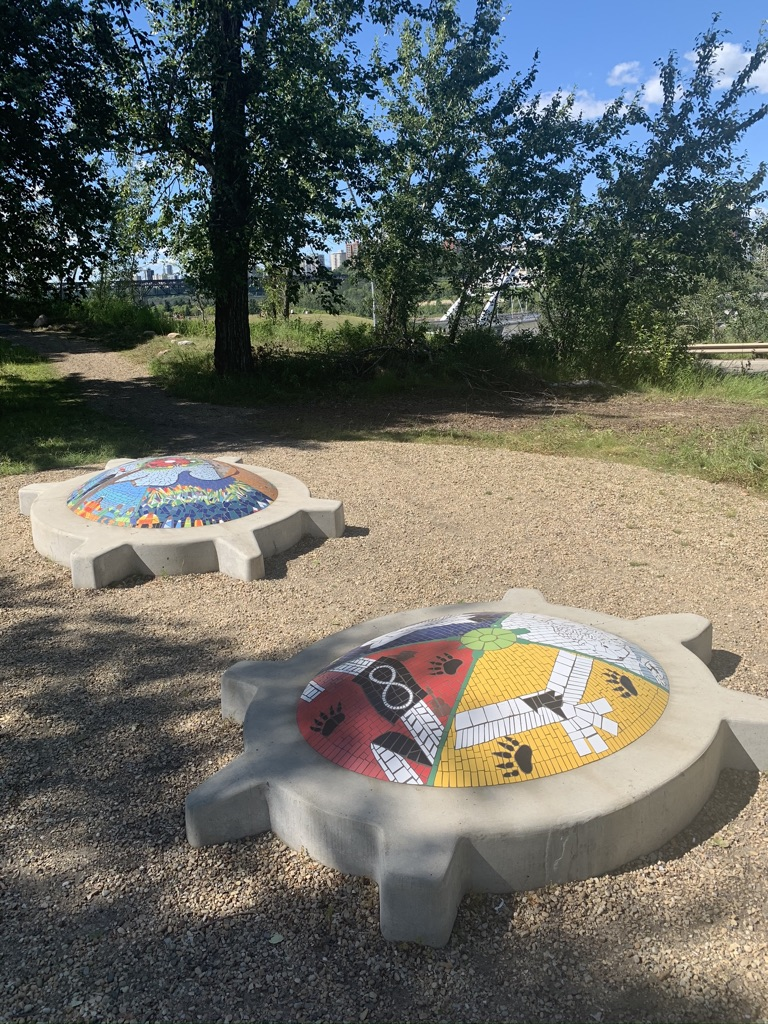
Mamohkamatowin (Helping Each Other) by Jerry Whitehead

=== mamohkamatowin (Helping Each Other) - Jerry Whitehead ===
Jerry Whitehead is a Cree artist from James Smith Cree Nation whose artistic practise has included beadwork, murals and paintings. Whitehead's installation features two large, concrete turtles with painted mosaics on their backs depicting ancient stories, representing the Cree creation story of Turtle Island.

The turtles are titled "mother" and "baby" and each mosaic depicts four stories in a quadrant layout. The mother turtle faces west and features detailed, colourful mosaics depicting the sweat lodge, an eagle, the Northern Lights, teepees, dancers, a woodpecker to symbolize the Papaschase people, a thunderbird, and a beaver.

To complete the baby turtle, Whitehead worked with students and elders at amiskwaciy Academy in Edmonton. The baby turtle faces north and its mosaic quadrants represent: the Métis people, an eagle, a buffalo, and feathers. Whitehead chose the name mamohkamatowin for his installation because, "The whole project worked because people were helping each other continuously, throughout the process from the beginning."

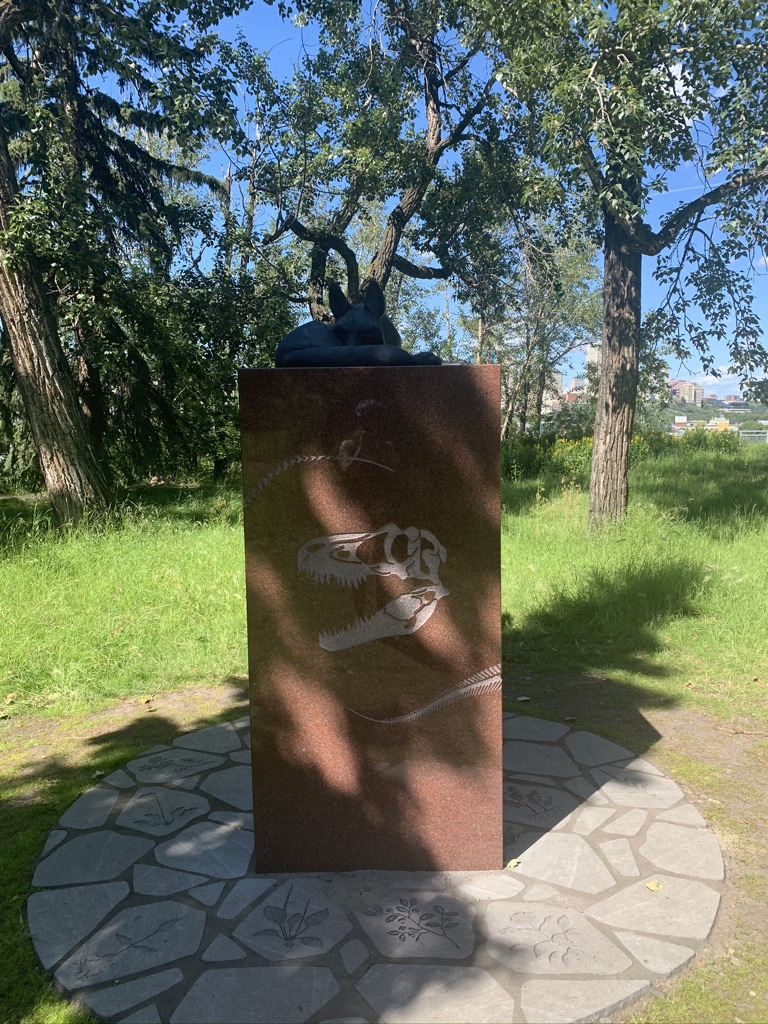
Reign by Mary Anne Barkhouse

=== Reign - Mary Anne Barkhouse ===
Mary Anne Barkhouse is a jeweller and sculpture artist from Kwakiutl First Nation whose work utilizes animal imagery to evoke themes of environmentalism and Indigenous culture. Barkhouse's installation features a 6 foot tall, polished red granite pillar decorated with etchings of fossils of the predator and prey Edmontosaurus and Albertosaurus. Atop the pillar is a bronze coyote laying curled up but awake and alert, and at the pillar's base there is a bronze jack rabbit also in a laying pose — another predator-prey pairing. At the base of the pillar is a mosaic of paving stones engraved to depict plant life of the river valley, including wild strawberry, blueberry, and kinnikinnick. The inclusion of plants in the piece is a nod to their history of nourishing body and soul, and providing sustenance and survival in the area. In an interview about the installation, Barkhouse said, "From a cultural and scientific point of view, I was trying to have the characters in the work be evocative of the checks and balances the evolutionary process has fine-tuned."

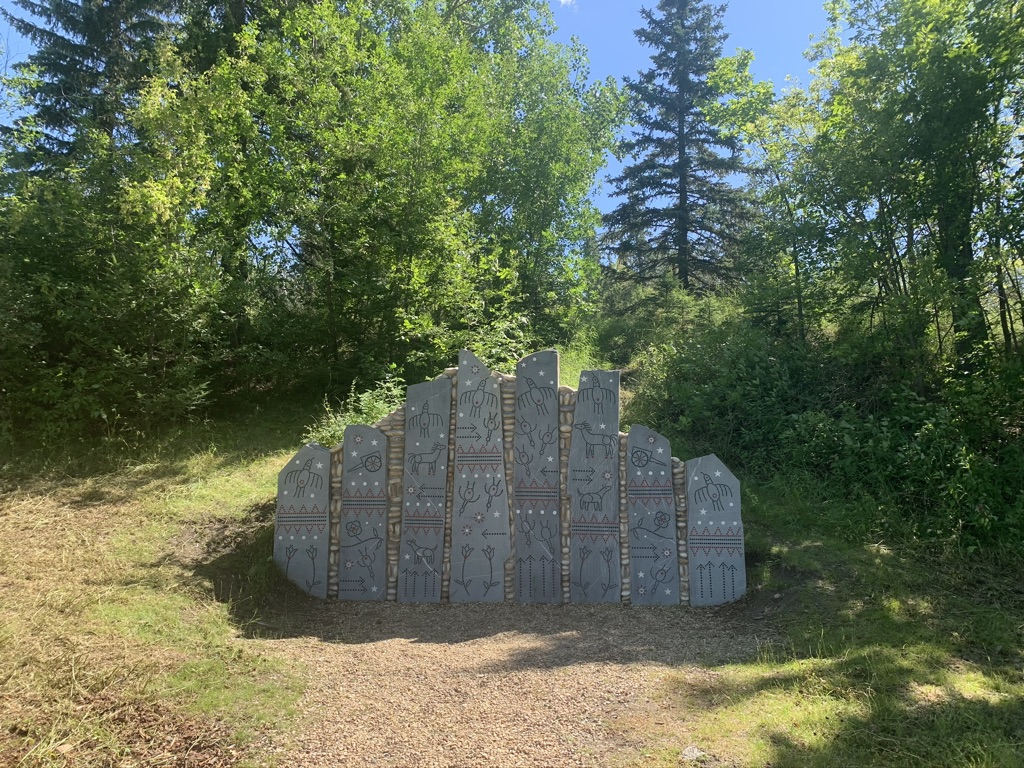
Preparing to Cross the Sacred River by Marianne Nicolson

=== Preparing to Cross the Sacred River - Marianne Nicolson ===
Marianne Nicolson is painter, photographer, sculptor, and installation artist of the Dzawada’enuxw First Nation who has trained in traditional Kwakwaka’wakw carving. Nicolson's installation title notes the nearby North Saskatchewan River and the piece contains many references to its formation, flora, fauna, and history of sustaining Indigenous peoples on its banks. To create Preparing to Cross the Sacred River, Nicolson used eight quarried stone slabs of varying heights connected with smoothed river rocks. The stone slabs are carved to look like petroglyphs, but with a more modern style that evokes beadwork, a traditional Indigenous method. In her research for the project, Nicolson spoke with many elders who told her their traditional stories, which she used to inform the imagery carved on the stones: geese, magpies, other animals, flowers, and arrows to show movement and give direction. The slabs also feature glyphs of a Métis cart and roses. In an interview about the piece, Nicholson said, "Basically, the metaphor of ‘preparing to cross the sacred river’ speaks to the idea that there is a different relationship to the land that needs to be considered in order to halt environmental damage or climate change. This change can be considered as way of crossing into a new place or worldview that is anchored in Indigenous teachings."

== Awards and recognition ==
In June 2019, the Americans for the Arts' Public Art Network recognized the park as one of the 50 best international public art projects, stating, "If the role of public art is to form a map of where a community or city has been, and where it’s going, then ᐄᓃᐤ (ÎNÎW) River Lot 11∞ is a momentous signpost on that journey."
