= Egremont =

Egremont may refer to:

== Places ==
- Egremont, Cumbria, England
  - Egremont (UK Parliament constituency), former constituency
- Egremont, Merseyside, England
- Egremont, Massachusetts, United States
- Egremont, Alberta, Canada

== Other uses ==
- Earl of Egremont
- Egremont Street - short lived name for portion of Queen Street in Toronto
