= Atmore, Alberta =

Atmore
- Hamlet
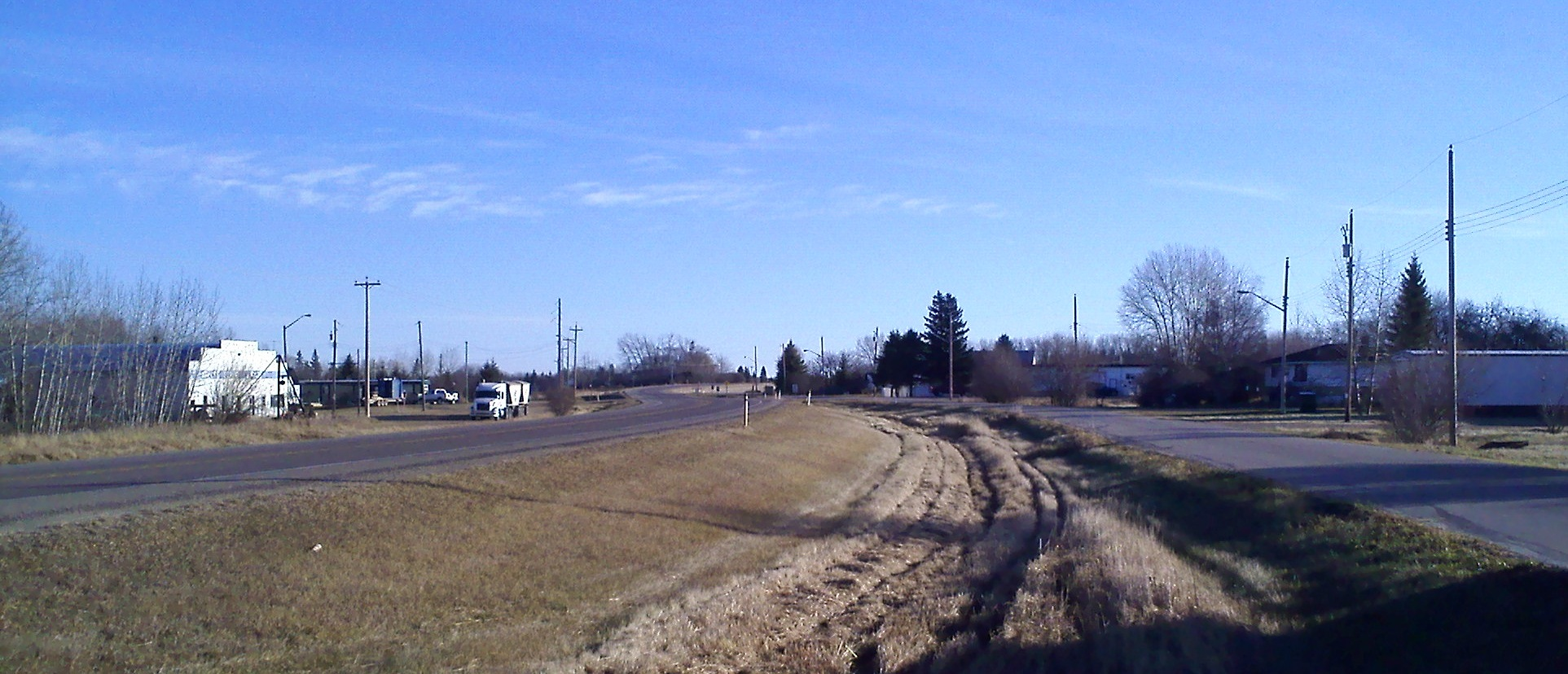
- Highway 55 through the community

- Location of Atmore in Alberta
- Coordinates: 54°49′9″N 112°33′1″W
- Country: Canada
- Province: Alberta
- Region: Northern Alberta
- Census division: 13
- Municipal district: Athabasca County

Government
  - Reeve: Doris Splane
  - Governing body: Athabasca County Council: Larry Armfelt; Christine Bilsky; Warren Griffin; Kevin Haines; Travais Johnson; Dwayne Rawson; Doris Splane; Penny Stewart; Denis Willcott

Area (2021)
  - Land: 0.54 km^{2} (0.21 sq mi)

Population (2021)
  - Total: 10
  - Density: 18.5/km^{2} (48/sq mi)
- Time zone: UTC−06:00 (Alberta Time)
- Website: www.athabascacounty.com

Atmore is a hamlet in Alberta, Canada within Athabasca County.

== Toponymy ==
Atmore is named after Atmore, Alabama. The Alabaman location derived its name from Charles Pawson Atmore, an employee of the Louisville and Nashville Railroad at the time of that city's 1897 christening.

== Geography ==
Atmore is located 1 km (0.62 mi) east of the junction of Highway 55 and Highway 63, 43 km (27 mi) west of Lac La Biche, 54 km (34 mi) east of Athabasca and 250 km (160 mi) south of Fort McMurray. The hamlet lies on the southwestern shore of Charron Lake and has an elevation of 585 m (1,919 ft).

== Amenities ==
Atmore contains an active community centre as of 2026, operated by the Atmore Community League. After Atmore Community Hall was beset with flooding during the summer of 2024, Athabasca County provided funds to reinforce the building.

Since 1986, Atmore Community Hall has organized the Atmore Hoof-a-Thon, an annual trail ride, dinner and dance that fundraises for the Mazankowski Heart Institute in Edmonton. As of 2024, the Atmore Hoof-a-Thon has raised over $800,000 for cardiac health since its inception.

== History ==
=== Dakin and Atmore: 1914-1948 ===
Settlement in the area later known as Atmore began around 1914, primarily by French-Canadian farmers hoping to defy conscription during the First World War. The first school in the area, Quebec School, was built in 1923.

The area began to be known as Dakin at some point after 1918, when Henry H. Dakin and his family moved there. Henry Dakin established a post office bearing his family name in 1925, and the school was renamed Dakin School in 1938.

A competing community named Atmore developed close to the Dakin settlement in the 1930s. An Atmore Community Club convened in 1938 for the purposes of building a community centre. In April 1939, a post office by the name Atmore was founded by postmaster Edmond Vogstad, operating out of his general store. Construction began on a hotel named the Atmore Hotel in 1947. After the Dakin post office closed in May 1948, the area became known as Atmore permanently.

=== Atmore's development: 1949-1979 ===
A bus service connecting Atmore to Fort McMurray operated briefly between 1949 and 1953. A Roman Catholic church, St. Philip's (also recorded as St. Philippe), was built in Atmore in 1952; Dakin School relocated to the nearby hamlet of Grassland the next year. After Atmore Cemetery was founded by the Catholic congregation in 1956, Henry Dakin was the first to be interred there.

The Atmore Hotel burned down in 1961. The next year, another fire destroyed Atmore's post office and general store. Although these locations were quickly rebuilt, the replacements burned down as well in 1968. They were not rebuilt again, and postal services operated out of the homes and businesses of local postmasters.

In 1963, a small United Church chapel in Lac La Biche fell into disuse. Atmore congregants of the United Church purchased the building and transported it to their locality. The church remained in use until it burned down in February 1973. For several years after this fire, St. Philip's Church offered use of their place of worship to United Church practitioners.

=== Recent development: 1980-present ===
Bishop Paul Terrio announced the closure of St. Philip Church in 2013. It ceased operations in July, and the land and building were sold by the Diocese of Saint Paul, Alberta. The St. Isidore Parish in nearby Plamondon assumed responsibility for maintaining the St. Philip Cemetery, which the Diocese of Saint Paul continued to own.

Shortly after Russia invaded Ukraine in 2022, residents of the communities of Atmore and Grassland organized a fundraiser to provide humanitarian aid in Ukraine and to help resettle Ukrainian refugees in Alberta. Over $40,000 was raised and donated to the Ed Stelmach Community Foundation. Stelmach himself was in attendance.

In March 2025, the Government of Alberta announced funding to fully twin Highway 63 from Fort McMurray to Edmonton, thus improving direct connections from Edmonton from Atmore. Two months later, Atmore was the site of two EF1 tornadoes. Some buildings were damaged, but no injuries were reported.

== Demographics ==
Population history of Atmore
| Year | Pop. | ±% |
|---|---|---|
| 1951 | 42 | — |
| 1956 | 51 | +21.4% |
| 1961 | 56 | +9.8% |
| 1966 | 38 | −32.1% |
| 1971 | 27 | −28.9% |
| 1976 | 37 | +37.0% |
| 1981 | 38 | +2.7% |
| 1986 | 37 | −2.6% |
| 1991 | 30 | −18.9% |
| 1996 | 35 | +16.7% |
| 2001 | 37 | +5.7% |
| 2006 | 20 | −45.9% |
| 2011 | 20 | +0.0% |
| 2016 | 35 | +75.0% |
| 2021 | 10 | −71.4% |
Source: Statistics Canada

In the 2021 Census of Population conducted by Statistics Canada, Atmore had a population of 10 living in 8 of its 12 total private dwellings, a change of −71.4% from its 2016 population of 35. With a land area of 0.54 km^{2} (0.21 sq mi), it had a population density of 18.5/km^{2} (48.0/sq mi) in 2021.

As a designated place in the 2016 Census of Population conducted by Statistics Canada, Atmore had a population of 35 living in 14 of its 16 total private dwellings, a change of 75% from its 2011 population of 20. With a land area of 0.54 km^{2} (0.21 sq mi), it had a population density of 64.8/km^{2} (167.9/sq mi) in 2016.

== See also ==
- List of communities in Alberta
- List of designated places in Alberta
- List of hamlets in Alberta
