= Newbrook Observatory =

- Interactive map of the Newbrook Observatory area

General information
- Location: Newbrook, Alberta, Canada
- Coordinates: 54.3242°N 112.9551°W
- Construction started: 1951
- Completed: 1951
- Client: Government of Canada

The Newbrook Observatory (a designated historic building) was built in Newbrook, Alberta, Canada, by the Stellar Physics Division of the Dominion Observatory and operated as a space observatory from 1952 until 1957. The observatory was equipped with a Super-Schmidt Meteor Camera, one of only six built by the Perkin-Elmer Company used to observe meteors. One of the observatory resident scientists, Art Griffin, was the first in North America to photograph the Sputnik 1 satellite (less than a week after its launch).

In 1970, the government consolidated astronomical research and the observatories at Meanook (similar nearby facility, c.23 miles NW) and Newbrook was closed.

== See also ==
- List of astronomical observatories
