= Crippsdale, Alberta =

- Location in Alberta
- Coordinates: 54.11686°N 113.15201°W
- Country: Canada
- Province: Alberta
- Region: Central Alberta
- Census division: 9
- County: Thorhild
- Time zone: UTC-7 (MST)

Crippsdale is a locality in Alberta, Canada.

M. J. Cripps, an early postmaster, gave the community his last name.
