= Alberta Highway 69 =

Highway in Alberta, Canada

Highway 69
- Saprae Creek Trail

Route information
- Maintained by the Ministry of Transportation and Economic Corridors
- Length: 14 km (8.7 mi)
- Existed: 1975/76–2014/15

Major junctions
- West end: Highway 63 in Fort McMurray
- East end: South of Saprae Creek

Location
- Country: Canada
- Province: Alberta
- Specialized and rural municipalities: RM of Wood Buffalo
- Major cities: Fort McMurray

Highway system
- Alberta Provincial Highway Network; List; Former
← Highway 68	→ Highway 72

Alberta Provincial Highway No. 69 was a 14 km (8.7 mi) east–west provincial highway in northern Alberta, Canada that existed for approximately 38 years between 1975/76 and 2014/15. It is now a municipal roadway under the jurisdiction of the Regional Municipality (RM) of Wood Buffalo and is named Saprae Creek Trail.

In the west, Highway 69 began at its intersection with Highway 63 at the south end of Fort McMurray, passing the Fort McMurray Airport and ending at a Canadian National's Lynton rail yard south of Saprae Creek and the Clearwater River.

== History ==
Highway 69 was originally designated as a secondary road in 1975 or 1976 known as Highway 969. It was redesignated as a primary highway in 1977 or 1978 and was renumbered as Highway 69. In 2014, the Government of Alberta and the RM of Wood Buffalo signed an agreement that would transfer provincial land to the RM to facilitate urban development on the Saline Creek Plateau in exchange for transferring jurisdiction over Highway 69 to the RM. The highway was transferred to the RM of Wood Buffalo sometime between March 2014 and March 2015.
