= McRae, Alberta =

Locality in Alberta, Canada

Coordinates: 54°21′20″N 111°42′52″W

Location of McRae Alberta

McRae is an unincorporated locality in northern Alberta within the County of St. Paul No. 19, located 16 kilometres (9.9 mi) south of Highway 55, 99 kilometres (62 mi) west of Cold Lake.
