= Tiffany Shaw-Collinge =

- Born: 1982 (age 43–44); Calgary, Alberta
- Occupations: Artist, and architect
- Known for: Public art exhibitions
- Notable work: Pehonan (2016)
- Website: tiffanyshaw.ca

Tiffany Shaw-Collinge is a Canadian Métis architect and artist based in Alberta. Her public art work can be found in Edmonton's Indigenous Art Park and Winnipeg's Markham Bus Station.

== Life and education ==
Tiffany Jeanine Shaw-Collinge was born in 1982 in Calgary, Alberta and was later raised in Edmonton, Alberta. In 2004 she received a Diploma of Fine Arts from MacEwan University and in 2006 she received a Bachelor of Fine Arts from the Nova Scotia College of Art and Design.

== Notable works ==
=== pehonan (2018) ===
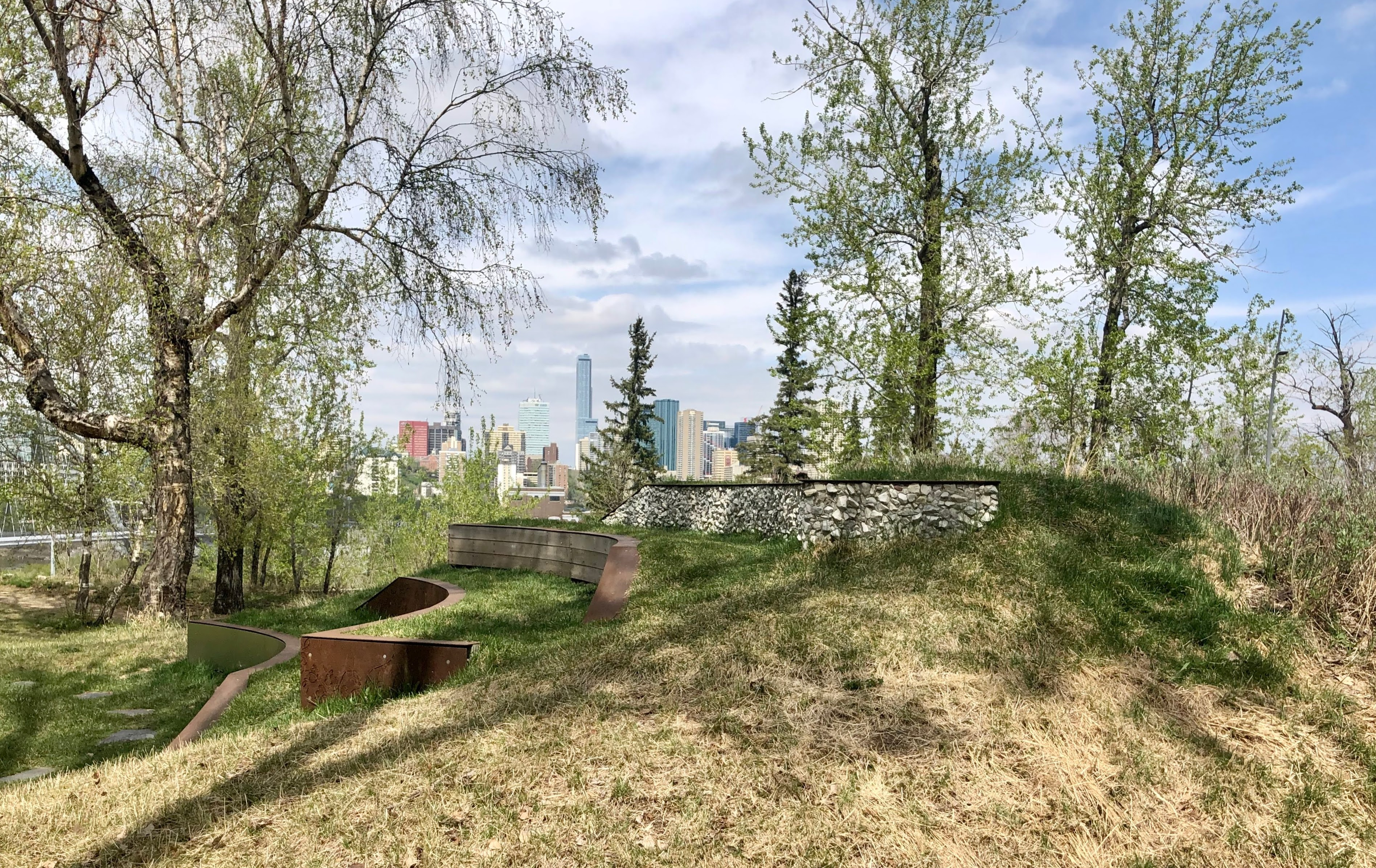
pehonan by Tiffany Shaw-Collinge.

pehonan, means "gathering or waiting place" in Cree, and is located in the Indigenous Art Park in Edmonton, Alberta.
