= Opal, Alberta =

Opal
- Hamlet
- Location of Opal Opal (Canada)
- Coordinates: 53°59′29″N 113°13′21″W
- Country: Canada
- Province: Alberta
- Region: Central Alberta
- Census division: 13
- Municipal district: Thorhild County

Government
  - Type: Unincorporated
  - Mayor: Jayce Cornelius
  - Governing body: Thorhild County Council

Population (2009)
  - Total: 24
- Time zone: UTC−06:00 (Alberta Time)
- Area codes: 780, 587, 825

Opal is a hamlet in central Alberta, Canada within Thorhild County. It is located 5 kilometres (3.1 mi) north of Highway 28, approximately 53 kilometres (33 mi) northeast of Edmonton. Originally named Rutherford after Alberta's first premier, Alexander Cameron Rutherford but was renamed to the unique "Opal" when the first post office opened on November 15, 1912.

In the late 1920s and early 1930s, Opal had a Roman Catholic Church (built in 1915), grain elevator (built 1918 by the Gillespie Grain Company), general store, International Harvester Company dealership, hardware store, lumber yard, blacksmith, Massey-Harris dealership, meat market, hotel (built in 1938), community hall, pool hall, railway station and school. In November 1954 the Opal Church was moved to Redwater.

== Demographics ==
The population of Opal was 24, as of a 2009 census conducted by Thorhild County.

== Notable residents ==
- Joe Yamauchi

== See also ==
- List of communities in Alberta
- List of hamlets in Alberta
