= Joe Yamauchi =

Canadian gridiron football player (1933–2021)

Profile
- Positions: Guard, Fullback, Linebacker

Personal information
- Born: March 3, 1933; Opal, Alberta
- Died: January 24, 2021 (aged 87); Vancouver, British Columbia
- Listed height: 5 ft 11 in (1.80 m)
- Listed weight: 185 lb (84 kg)

Career information
- College: Eastern Washington

Career history
- 1954: Edmonton Eskimos*
- 1955–1956: Calgary Stampeders
- 1957–1960: BC Lions
- * Offseason or practice squad member only

Joe Elias Kimio Yamauchi (March 3, 1933 – January 24, 2021) was a Canadian professional football player who played for the Edmonton Eskimos, Calgary Stampeders and BC Lions. He previously played at Eastern Washington University.
