= Amy Malbeuf =

Canadian artist and educator

Amy Malbeuf is a Canadian-Métis visual artist, educator, and cultural tattoo practitioner born in Rich Lake, Alberta.

Malbeuf examines notions of language, territory, nature and identity through a multidisciplinary approach. Alongside her artistic practice, Malbeuf teaches the skills and traditions of caribou and moose hair tufting and embroidery.

== Education ==
Malbeuf received her BFA from the Alberta College of Art + Design in Calgary and an MFA in Visual Art from the University of British Columbia Okanagan in Kelowna. She has participated in numerous international artist residencies, including programs at the Royal Melbourne Institute of Technology, The Banff Centre, The Labrador Research Institute, and Santa Fe Art Institute. She is also certified as a Native Cultural Arts Instructor by Portage College in Lac La Biche.

== Art ==
Caribou hair tufting, beadwork, installation, performance, and video are prominent in Malbeuf's work. Her practice examines the relationships between humanity and nature by deconstructing misunderstandings of Native culture and exploring intersections between culture and race.

Works such as Iskotew (2018), a sculpture of the Cree word for "Fire" described as ᐃᐢᑯᑌᐤ in Nēhiyawēwin, look at Native heritage through landscape and language.

As a cultural tattoo practitioner, Malbeuf practices skin stitch, an indigenous tattoo process that sews thread dipped in ink into the skin.

== Selected exhibitions ==
Malbeuf has exhibited her works at national and international venues including the MacKenzie Art Gallery, Art Gallery of Alberta, Contemporary Calgary, and Stride Gallery.

=== Solo exhibitions ===
- 2018 Tensions, Illingworth Kerr Gallery, Alberta College of Art + Design, Calgary
- 2018 The Length of Grief, AKA Centre, Saskatoon
- 2017 Inheritance, Kelowna Art Gallery, CAN
- 2017 Foundations, Queen Specific Window Space, Toronto, CAN
- 2016 apihkew, Alternator Centre for Contemporary Art, Kelowna, CAN
- 2015 A Woman And This Bannock That She Made For You, Plain Red Gallery, First Nations University of Canada, Regina, CAN
- 2014 kayas-ago, Art Gallery of Alberta: RBC New Works Gallery, Edmonton, CAN
- 2011 Beyond..., Stride Gallery Project Room, Calgary, CAN

=== Group exhibitions ===
- 2018 In Dialogue, Art Gallery of Southwestern Manitoba, Brandon, CAN
- 2017 Entering the Landscape, Plug In ICA, Winnipeg, CAN
- 2017 Connective Tissue, Museum of Contemporary Native Arts, Santa Fe, US
- 2016 No Visible Horizon, Walter Phillips Gallery, Banff, CAN
- 2016 If We Never Met…, Pataka Art + Museum, Porirua, NZ
- 2015 Material Girls, Dunlop Art Gallery, Regina, CAN
- 2015 Future Station: Alberta Biennial of Contemporary Art, Art Gallery of Alberta, Edmonton, CAN
- 2014 Wayfinders, TREX, Art Gallery of Alberta, (four year travelling show)
- 2013 Gashka’oode: Tangled, Forest City Gallery, London, CAN
- 2012 Indigeneity, Feature Exhibit: The Works Festival, Edmonton, CAN
- 2011 Ancestral Teachings: Contemporary Perspectives, Gladstone Hotel, Toronto, CAN
- 2010 Pioneer Whiskey, Marion Nicoll Gallery LRT Space, Alberta College of Art + Design, Calgary, CAN (with Sarah Van Sloten)

=== Public art commissions ===
- 2018 Iskotew, sculpture, Indigenous Art Park, Edmonton Arts Council, CAN
- 2013 Upholstered Cultural Facets of a Pehonan, Ramble in the Bramble, Transitory public art project, Edmonton Arts Council

== Awards ==
Malbeuf has received awards such as the 2016 Lieutenant Governor of Alberta Emerging Artist Award, the 2016 William and Meredith Saunderson Prize for Emerging Artists in Canada from the Hnatyshyn Foundation, a 2017 REVEAL award from the Hnatyshyn Foundation and was long listed for the 2017 Sobey Art Award.
