= Rich Lake, Alberta =

Coordinates: 54°30′28″N 111°37′07″W

Location of Rich Lake Alberta

Rich Lake is an unincorporated community in northern Alberta, Canada within Lac La Biche County. It is 1 kilometre (0.62 mi) north of Highway 55, approximately 93 kilometres (58 mi) west of Cold Lake.

== Notable people ==
- Amy Malbeuf – Métis visual artist, educator, and cultural tattoo practitioner
