= Saprae Creek =

- Hamlet
- Location of Saprae Creek Saprae Creek (Canada)
- Coordinates: 56°39′41″N 111°09′16″W
- Country: Canada
- Province: Alberta
- Region: Northern Alberta
- Census division: 16
- Municipal district: Regional Municipality of Wood Buffalo

Government
  - Type: Unincorporated
  - Governing body: Regional Municipality of Wood Buffalo Council

Area (2021)
  - Land: 3.6 km^{2} (1.4 sq mi)

Population (2021)
  - Total: 508
  - Density: 141.1/km^{2} (365/sq mi)
- Time zone: UTC−06:00 (Alberta Time)
- Area codes: 780, 587, 825

Saprae Creek is a hamlet in northern Alberta, Canada within the Regional Municipality (RM) of Wood Buffalo. It is located 3 kilometres (1.9 mi) north of Highway 69, approximately 11 kilometres (6.8 mi) east of Fort McMurray.

== 2016 wildfire ==
On May 4, 2016, the hamlet was evacuated due to the growing fire to the southwest near the Fort McMurray International Airport. By May 5, severe damage was reported to 30% of buildings.

== Demographics ==
Population history of Saprae Creek
Year	Pop.	±%
2001	637	—
2006	664	+4.2%
2011	694	+4.5%
2016	572	−17.6%
2021	508	−11.2%
Source: Statistics Canada

In the 2021 Census of Population conducted by Statistics Canada, Saprae Creek had a population of 508 living in 176 of its 194 total private dwellings, a change of −11.2% from its 2016 population of 572. With a land area of 3.6 km^{2} (1.4 sq mi), it had a population density of 141.1/km^{2} (365.5/sq mi) in 2021.

The population of Saprae Creek according to the 2018 municipal census conducted by the Regional Municipality of Wood Buffalo is 715, a decrease from its 2012 municipal census population count of 925.

As a designated place in the 2016 Census of Population conducted by Statistics Canada, Saprae Creek had a population of 572 living in 191 of its 215 total private dwellings, a change of −17.6% from its 2011 population of 694. With a land area of 3.6 km^{2} (1.4 sq mi), it had a population density of 158.9/km^{2} (411.5/sq mi) in 2016.

== See also ==
- List of communities in Alberta
- List of designated places in Alberta
- List of hamlets in Alberta
