= Egremont, Alberta =

Egremont
- Hamlet
- Location of Egremont Egremont (Canada)
- Coordinates: 54°02′18″N 113°07′34″W
- Country: Canada
- Province: Alberta
- Region: Central Alberta
- Census division: 13
- Municipal district: Thorhild County

Government
  - Type: Unincorporated
  - Governing body: Thorhild County Council

Area (2021)
  - Land: 0.19 km^{2} (0.073 sq mi)

Population (2021)
  - Total: 46
  - Density: 238.3/km^{2} (617/sq mi)
- Time zone: UTC−06:00 (Alberta Time)
- Area codes: 780, 587, 825

Egremont is a hamlet in central Alberta, Canada within Thorhild County. It is located 2 kilometres (1.2 mi) north of Highway 28, approximately 37 kilometres (23 mi) north of Fort Saskatchewan. It is named after Egremont, Cumbria.

== Demographics ==
Population history of Egremont
Year	Pop.	±%
1941	111	—
1951	103	−7.2%
1956	106	+2.9%
1961	119	+12.3%
1966	94	−21.0%
1971	92	−2.1%
1976	57	−38.0%
1981	61	+7.0%
1986	75	+23.0%
1991	62	−17.3%
2011	42	−32.3%
2016	48	+14.3%
2021	46	−4.2%
Source: Statistics Canada

In the 2021 Census of Population conducted by Statistics Canada, Egremont had a population of 46 living in 27 of its 34 total private dwellings, a change of −4.2% from its 2016 population of 48. With a land area of 0.19 km^{2} (0.073 sq mi), it had a population density of 242.1/km^{2} (627.0/sq mi) in 2021.

As a designated place in the 2016 Census of Population conducted by Statistics Canada, Egremont had a population of 48 living in 27 of its 34 total private dwellings, a change of 14.3% from its 2011 population of 42. With a land area of 0.19 km^{2} (0.073 sq mi), it had a population density of 252.6/km^{2} (654.3/sq mi) in 2016.

== See also ==
- List of communities in Alberta
- List of hamlets in Alberta
