= Thorhild County =

Municipal district in Alberta, Canada

- Municipal district

- Location within Alberta
- Country: Canada
- Province: Alberta
- Region: Central Alberta
- Census division: 13
- Established: 1955
- Incorporated: 1955

Government
  - Reeve: Trevor Dafoe
  - Governing body: Thorhild County Council
  - Administrative office: Thorhild

Area (2021)
  - Land: 1,997.17 km^{2} (771.11 sq mi)

Population (2021)
  - Total: 3,042
  - Density: 1.5/km^{2} (3.9/sq mi)
- Time zone: UTC−06:00 (Alberta Time)
- Area code: 780
- Website: thorhildcounty.com

Thorhild County is a municipal district located in the central part of northern Alberta, Canada, in Census Division 13. It was incorporated in 1955. It changed its name from the County of Thorhild No. 7 to Thorhild County on March 20, 2013.

== Geography ==
=== Communities and localities ===
The following urban municipalities are surrounded by Thorhild County.

Cities

- none

Towns

- none

Villages

- none

Summer villages

- none

The following hamlets are located within Thorhild County.

Hamlets

- Abee
- Egremont
- Long Lake
- Newbrook
- Opal
- Radway (dissolved from village status in 1996)
- Thorhild (dissolved from village status in 2009)

The following localities are located within Thorhild County.

Localities

- Alpen
- Alpen Siding
- Balsam Grove
- Clearbrook
- Crippsdale
- Dalmuir
- Danube
- Darling
- Elbridge
- Hollow Lake
- Kerensky
- Mapova
- Northbrook
- Pinebrook
- Val Soucy
- Weasel Creek
- Woodgrove

== Demographics ==
In the 2021 Census of Population conducted by Statistics Canada, Thorhild County had a population of 3,042 living in 1,339 of its 1,852 total private dwellings, a change of −6.5% from its 2016 population of 3,254. With a land area of 1,997.17 km^{2} (771.11 sq mi), it had a population density of 1.5/km^{2} (3.9/sq mi) in 2021.

In the 2016 Census of Population conducted by Statistics Canada, Thorhild County had a population of 3,254 living in 1,401 of its 1,836 total private dwellings, a −4.8% change from its 2011 population of 3,417. With a land area of 2,001.74 km^{2} (772.88 sq mi), it had a population density of 1.6/km^{2} (4.2/sq mi) in 2016.

== See also ==
- List of communities in Alberta
- List of municipal districts in Alberta
