= Radway, Alberta =

Radway
- Hamlet
- Location of Radway Radway (Canada)
- Coordinates: 54°03′36″N 112°56′42″W
- Country: Canada
- Province: Alberta
- Region: Central Alberta
- Census division: 13
- Municipal district: Thorhild County

Government
  - Type: Unincorporated
  - Governing body: Thorhild County Council

Area (2021)
  - Land: 0.59 km^{2} (0.23 sq mi)

Population (2021)
  - Total: 231
  - Density: 390.5/km^{2} (1,011/sq mi)
- Time zone: UTC−06:00 (Alberta Time)
- Area codes: 780, 587, 825

Radway is a hamlet in central Alberta, Canada within Thorhild County. It is located 0.75 kilometres (0.47 mi) southeast of Highway 28, approximately 42 kilometres (26 mi) northeast of Fort Saskatchewan and 70 kilometres (43 mi) northeast of Edmonton.

== Demographics ==
In the 2021 Census of Population conducted by Statistics Canada, Radway had a population of 231 living in 90 of its 100 total private dwellings, a change of 35.1% from its 2016 population of 171. With a land area of 0.59 km^{2} (0.23 sq mi), it had a population density of 391.5/km^{2} (1,014.0/sq mi) in 2021.

As a designated place in the 2016 Census of Population conducted by Statistics Canada, Radway had a population of 171 living in 69 of its 82 total private dwellings, a change of 5.6% from its 2011 population of 162. With a land area of 0.6 km^{2} (0.23 sq mi), it had a population density of 285.0/km^{2} (738.1/sq mi) in 2016.

== See also ==
- Krause Milling Co.
- List of communities in Alberta
- List of former urban municipalities in Alberta
- List of hamlets in Alberta
