= Wandering River =

- Hamlet
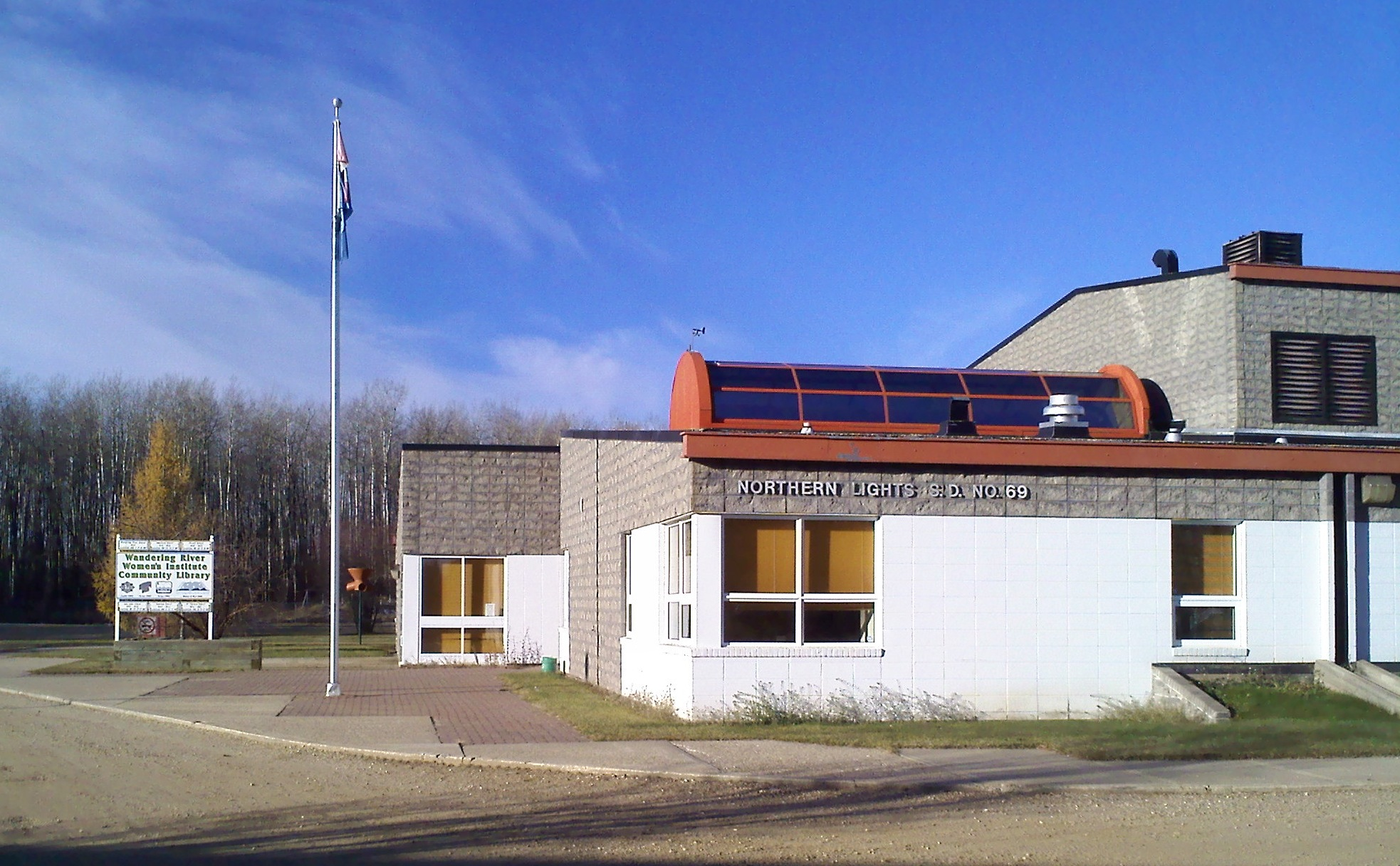
- Wandering River school and community library
- Motto: Gateway to the Oil Sands
- Location of Wandering River in Alberta
- Coordinates: 55°11′48″N 112°28′24″W
- Country: Canada
- Province: Alberta
- Region: Northern Alberta
- Census division: 13
- Municipal district: Athabasca County

Government
  - Reeve: Doris Splane
  - Governing body: Athabasca County Council: Larry Armfelt; Christine Bilsky; Warren Griffin; Kevin Haines; Travais Johnson; Dwayne Rawson; Doris Splane; Penny Stewart; Denis Willcott

Population (1991)
  - Total: 63
- Time zone: UTC−06:00 (Alberta Time)
- Website: www.athabascacounty.com

Wandering River is a hamlet in northern Alberta, Canada within Athabasca County. It is located approximately 95 kilometres (59 mi) north of Athabasca and 200 kilometres (120 mi) south of Fort McMurray on Highway 63. The hamlet is located in Census Division No. 13 and in the federal riding of Lakeland. The community is named after the Wandering River, which flows straight through the community and through Lyle Lake to the north.

== History ==
In 1927 the Muskeg Prairie district, which included what is now Wandering River was opened for homesteading and the area was quickly settled. Early settlers came from a multitude of different backgrounds, including Austrian, Ukrainian, Polish, American, and German immigrants as well as people from all across Canada. For the first few years, mail was hauled on horseback, and later in wagons, from nearby Plamondon via a wagon trail with the first automobiles coming to the area during the 1930s. The first store in Wandering River was opened by the Coonan family in 1930, and hosted a general assortment of supplies including salt, flour, and groceries. 1932 saw the Wandering River Post Office opening as well as the construction of St. Elias Ukrainian Orthodox Church. The Wandering River School was built in 1935 and accommodated over a hundred pupils up to Grade 12. In 1936 an Anglican church and mission were built. Trapping, logging, and later ranching were and remain the main sources of income for residents. During the 50s and 60s, there were regular Greyhound buses to Fort McMurray. In 1962, construction began on Highway 63, but it didn't reach Wandering River until 1966 and the highway wasn't paved until the 1970s. Construction for the present townsite started in 1967, with the Wandering River Motel opening in 1968. In 1981 the Wandering River Volunteer Fire Department was established, and later the same year, the Wandering River Golf & Country Club was opened, with an RV park added in 2001. In 1985 a new school opened in the community for Grades K-9 (later changed to K-8).

== Demographics ==
Wandering River recorded a population of 63 in the 1991 Census of Population conducted by Statistics Canada.

== Services and amenities ==
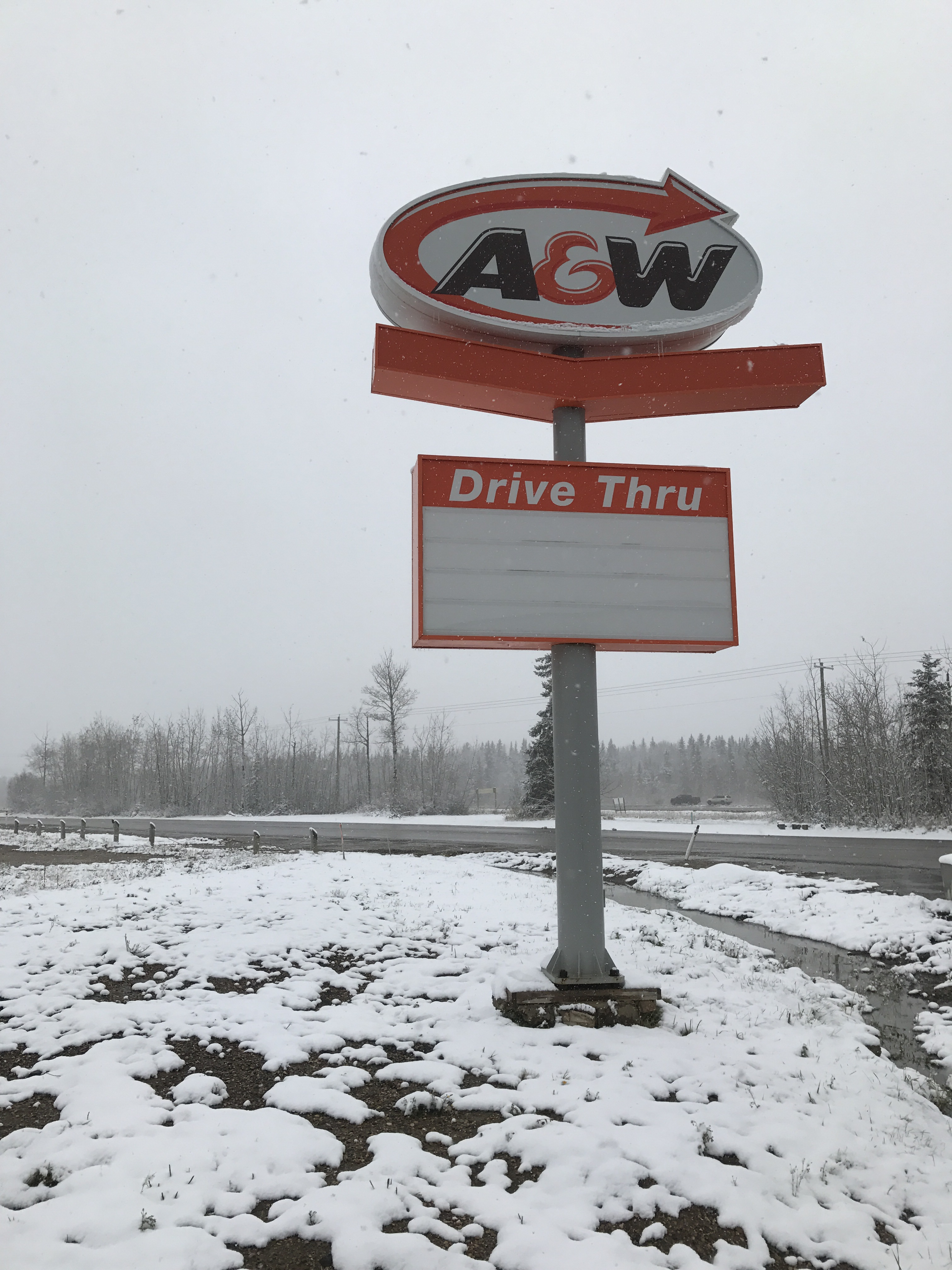
Wandering River has been home to an A&W since the early 2000s

The community has a small number of motels, service stations, an K-8 school, and a post office. The area also has several amenities including a skating and curling rink, a public library, a community hall, a fire station, a water treatment plant, an RV camp, a senior's centre and a golf course. Wandering River is home to two churches; the Anglican Christ Church and the St. Elias Orthodox Church. There is also a Roman Catholic church in nearby Breynat. For high school, students from Wandering River go to Ecole Plamondon School in Plamondon 39 kilometres (24 mi) away. The community has had multiple baseball teams throughout its history, with the Wandering River Rangers being the name of the team played at local tournaments in the early 2000s, another team with an unclear name during the 1940s, and the Wandering River Squirts being the girls team that made it to provincials in 1983.

== See also ==
- List of communities in Alberta
- List of hamlets in Alberta
