= Donatville =

- Hamlet
- Location of Donatville in Alberta
- Coordinates: 54.747°N 112.804°W
- Country: Canada
- Province: Alberta
- Region: Northern Alberta
- Census division: 13
- Municipal district: Athabasca County

Government
  - Reeve: Doris Splane
  - Governing body: Athabasca County Council: Larry Armfelt; Christine Bilsky; Warren Griffin; Kevin Haines; Travais Johnson; Dwayne Rawson; Doris Splane; Penny Stewart; Denis Willcott

Area
  - Land: 0.67 km^{2} (0.26 sq mi)

Population (2016)
  - Total: 0
- Time zone: UTC−06:00 (Alberta Time)
- Website: www.athabascacounty.com

Donatville is a hamlet in northern Alberta, Canada within Athabasca County. It is on Highway 63, approximately 118 kilometres (73 mi) northeast of Fort Saskatchewan. The community has the name of Donat Gingras, a pioneer citizen. The first school opened in 1915.

== Demographics ==
Population history of Donatville
Year	Pop.	±%
1991A	12	—
1996	14	+16.7%
2001	10	−28.6%
2006	0	−100.0%
2006C	5	—
2011	5	+0.0%
2016	0	−100.0%
Source: Statistics Canada

As a designated place in the 2016 Census of Population conducted by Statistics Canada, Donatville recorded a population of 0 living in 1 of its 1 total private dwellings, a change of −100% from its 2011 population of 5. With a land area of 0.67 km^{2} (0.26 sq mi), it had a population density of 0.0/km^{2} (0.0/sq mi) in 2016.

As a designated place in the 2011 Census, Donatville had a population of 5 living in 3 of its 6 total dwellings, a 0% change from its 2006 population of 0. With a land area of 0.66 km^{2} (0.25 sq mi), it had a population density of 7.6/km^{2} (19.6/sq mi) in 2011.

== See also ==
- List of communities in Alberta
- List of hamlets in Alberta
