= Boyle, Alberta =

Boyle
- Village
- Village of Boyle
- Location of Boyle in Alberta Boyle (Canada)
- Coordinates: 54°35′14.7″N 112°48′12.1″W
- Country: Canada
- Province: Alberta
- Region: Northern Alberta
- Census division: 13
- Municipal district: Athabasca County
- Founded: 1916
- Incorporated
  - Village: December 31, 1953
- Named after: John Robert Boyle

Government
  - Mayor: Colin Derko
  - Governing body: Boyle Village Council

Area (2021)
  - Land: 7.12 km^{2} (2.75 sq mi)

Population (2021)
  - Total: 825
  - Density: 115.9/km^{2} (300/sq mi)
- Time zone: UTC−06:00 (Alberta Time)
- Forward sortation area: T9S
- Area codes: 780, 587, 825
- Highways: Highway 63; Highway 663; Highway 831
- Waterways: Flat Lake, Long Lake, Skeleton Lake
- Website: boylealberta.ca

Boyle is a village in northern Alberta, Canada within Athabasca County. It is located on Highway 63, approximately 163 kilometres (101 mi) north of Edmonton.

Boyle is named after former Alberta Minister of Education, Justice John Robert Boyle (1871–1936), and founded in 1916.

== Demographics ==
In the 2021 Census of Population conducted by Statistics Canada, the Village of Boyle had a population of 825 living in 368 of its 433 total private dwellings, a change of −2.4% from its 2016 population of 845. With a land area of 7.12 km^{2} (2.75 sq mi), it had a population density of 115.9/km^{2} (300.1/sq mi) in 2021.

In the 2016 Census of Population conducted by Statistics Canada, the Village of Boyle recorded a population of 845 living in 357 of its 464 total private dwellings, a −7.8% change from its 2011 population of 916. With a land area of 7.13 km^{2} (2.75 sq mi), it had a population density of 118.5/km^{2} (306.9/sq mi) in 2016.

The population of the Village of Boyle according to its 2014 municipal census is 948, a 3.3% change from its 2009 municipal census population of 918.

== Notable people ==
- Tim Hague - Mixed martial artist
- Bryan Mudryk - sports broadcaster

== See also ==
- List of communities in Alberta
- List of villages in Alberta
