= Grassland, Alberta =

Grassland
- Hamlet
- Location of Grassland in Alberta
- Coordinates: 54°49′9″N 112°41′7″W
- Country: Canada
- Province: Alberta
- Region: Northern Alberta
- Census division: 13
- Municipal district: Athabasca County

Government
  - Reeve: Doris Splane
  - Governing body: Athabasca County Council: Larry Armfelt; Christine Bilsky; Warren Griffin; Kevin Haines; Travais Johnson; Dwayne Rawson; Doris Splane; Penny Stewart; Denis Willcott

Area (2021)
  - Land: 1.45 km^{2} (0.56 sq mi)

Population (2021)
  - Total: 46
  - Density: 31.7/km^{2} (82/sq mi)
- Time zone: UTC−06:00 (Alberta Time)
- Website: www.athabascacounty.com

Grassland is a hamlet in northern Alberta, Canada within Athabasca County. It is on Highway 63, 151 kilometres (94 mi) northeast of Edmonton.

== Toponymy ==
Grassland, named for its characteristic grassy terrain, was initially known as Forrest Grove. This changed in 1927 when Canada Post refused an application to open a post office with that name, owing to the presence of similarly titled settlements in Alberta.

== History ==
=== Founding and development: 1800–1949 ===
Permanent settlement began in the Grassland area in the late 1800s, consisting primarily of individual farms. After the First World War, Canada's federal government officially launched advertising to attract homesteaders, primarily from the United States. The area's isolated nature and hostile farming conditions drove American families away, and Eastern European settlers soon constituted the majority of Grassland's population.

Forrest Grove School opened to serve the growing community in 1926. Grassland Post Office opened the next year, followed the Holy Trinity Anglican Church in 1936. Several commercial operations began operating in Grassland throughout the 1930s and 1940s, including general stores, a pool hall, and a Massey dealership.

Grassland Community Hall opened in 1946. For some years after its establishment, the hall hosted 'surgery days' that gave residents access to health services. A medical team from Edmonton attended the hall to perform procedures, including dental work or tonsillectomies. The hall also hosted dances, weddings, and movie showings.

In 1948, Forrest Grove School changed its name to Grassland School to match its locality.

=== Rest of 20th century: 1950–2000 ===
A new schoolhouse was built in 1957. Grassland School's original building remained in use as an events venue, until the structure was condemned in 1964. In 1958, locals held a raffle to raise money for the construction of a curling rink, for which the grand prize was a car. This fundraising effort was successful; the rink remained open until 1973, when it too was condemned.

Grassland's Ukrainian Orthodox began constructing a church in 1959. The Holy Transfiguration Ukrainian Orthodox Church of Grassland opened the following year. Evangelical worshippers in Grassland and surrounding communities opened the Grassland Full Gospel Church in 1964.

Grassland Fire Department, a volunteer fire department, constructed a fire station to serve the area in 1976. The Holy Trinity Anglican Church closed the following year. In April 1982, Grassland residents organized a school charter to convert Grassland School into a community school.

=== 21st century: 2001–present ===
A wildfire struck Grassland in May 2012, destroying one home and two machine shops. Around 15 families were evacuated as the fire reached a peak of 1,000 hectares.

In 2019, Grassland Community School underwent a viability study due to having just 36 students. The following year, Aspen View Public School Division voted to close the school's high school grades (grades 10 to 12). An unknown arsonist attempted to burn down the original Grassland School building in 2021, though the abandoned structure survived.

In 2025, Grassland Community School's students achieved above average grades compared to the rest of the Aspen View Public School Division. Grassland Fire Department held a dinner to celebrate fifty years of operations in 2026.

== Services ==
=== Public services ===
Grassland Community School teaches students from pre-kindergarten until grade 9. The building also hosts Grassland Public Library. Emergency and fire services are provided through Grassland Fire Department.

=== Recreation ===
Grassland Agricultural Society manages Grassland Community Hall, which serves as an events venue. Grassland also hosts a ball diamond and camping sites.

=== Places of worship ===
As of 2026, the Grassland Full Gospel Church and the Holy Transfiguration Church are active places of worship.

== Demographics ==
Population history of Grassland
| Year | Pop. | ±% |
|---|---|---|
| 1941 | 29 | — |
| 1951 | 85 | +193.1% |
| 1956 | 86 | +1.2% |
| 1961 | 90 | +4.7% |
| 1966 | 75 | −16.7% |
| 1971 | 66 | −12.0% |
| 1976 | 61 | −7.6% |
| 1981 | 66 | +8.2% |
| 1986 | 66 | +0.0% |
| 1991 | 80 | +21.2% |
| 1991A | 81 | +1.2% |
| 1996 | 82 | +1.2% |
| 2001 | 101 | +23.2% |
| 2006 | 73 | −27.7% |
| 2011 | 94 | +28.8% |
| 2016 | 68 | −27.7% |
| 2021 | 46 | −32.4% |
Source: Statistics Canada

In the 2021 Census of Population conducted by Statistics Canada, Grassland had a population of 46 living in 20 of its 42 total private dwellings, a change of −32.4% from its 2016 population of 68. With a land area of 1.45 km^{2} (0.56 sq mi), it had a population density of 31.7/km^{2} (82.2/sq mi) in 2021.

As a designated place in the 2016 Census of Population conducted by Statistics Canada, Grassland had a population of 68 living in 26 of its 52 total private dwellings, a change of −27.7% from its 2011 population of 94. With a land area of 1.47 km^{2} (0.57 sq mi), it had a population density of 46.3/km^{2} (119.8/sq mi) in 2016.

== Notable residents ==
- David Yurdiga (b. 1964) — farmer and member of Parliament who operated his family's farm in Grassland
- Mike Petryk (b. 1934) — dentist who grew up in Grassland and became the namesake of the University of Alberta's Mike Petryk School of Dentistry in 2024, following a $10 million donation by Petryk and his family

== See also ==
- List of communities in Alberta
- List of designated places in Alberta
- List of hamlets in Alberta
