= Alberta Highway 663 =

Highway in Alberta, Canada

Highway 663
- Highway 663 highlighted in red

Route information
- Maintained by Alberta Transportation
- Existed: 1964–present

West segment
- Length: 152.1 km (94.5 mi)
- West end: Highway 44 at Fawcett
- Major intersections: Highway 2 at Meanook; Highway 63 at Boyle
- East end: Highway 55 west of Lac La Biche

East segment
- Length: 39.5 km (24.5 mi)
- West end: Highway 881 east of Lac La Biche
- East end: Torchwood Lake

Location
- Country: Canada
- Province: Alberta
- Specialized and rural municipalities: Westlock County, Athabasca County, Lac La Biche County
- Major cities: Boyle, Lac La Biche

Highway system
- Alberta Numbered Highway Network; List; Former
← Highway 661	→ Highway 665

Alberta Provincial Highway No. 663 is a highway in the province of Alberta, Canada. It runs west-east from Highway 44 near Fawcett, runs concurrent with Highway 2 and Highway 63 to Boyle. Then to a concurrency with Highway 55 (Northern Woods and Water Route) in Lac La Biche before extending north around Lakeland Provincial Park to Torchwood Lake. It is also known as Taylor Road in Boyle, and 88 Avenue in Lac La Biche.

== History ==
In the 1940s the roads that become Secondary Highways were only dirt trails. Farmers would have to use axes to clear the brush of the boreal forest from the road allowance, and use plows and machinery pulled by horses to maintain the roads and fill in low spots that filled with water during spring melt and summer rains. These were not all weather roads, there were no snow ploughs to keep the roads clear over the winter months, so in the 1950s the larger farm trucks could only make it through a few months of the year. By 1957, the road saw an application of gravel to the surface, and was graded. A formal surveying crew came through in 1963 to clear brush and mark the path of the highway which was constructed in 1964.

== Major intersections ==
Starting from the west end of Highway 663:

Rural/specialized municipality	Location	km	mi	Destinations	Notes
Westlock County	Fawcett	0.0	0.0	Highway 44 – Westlock, Slave Lake	Western terminus
Westlock County		17.2	10.7	Highway 801 – Cross Lake Provincial Park	
Athabasca County		41.6	25.8	Highway 812 north – Baptiste Lake	
Athabasca County		51.3	31.9	Township Road 650 east – Meanook Highway 2 south – Edmonton	West end of Highway 2 concurrency
Athabasca County		54.0	33.6	Highway 2 north – Athabasca	East end of Highway 2 concurrency
Athabasca County	Colinton	59.6	37.0		
Athabasca County		62.6	38.9	Highway 827 – Athabasca, Thorhild	
Athabasca County		82.0	51.0	Highway 63 south – Edmonton	West end of Highway 63 concurrency
Athabasca County	Boyle	90.4	56.2	Highway 63 north – Fort McMurray	East end of Highway 63 concurrency
Athabasca County	Boyle	91.4	56.8	Highway 831 (Lakeview Road) – Waskatenau	
Athabasca County	Caslan	112.0	69.6		
Lac La Biche County		118.2	73.4	Highway 855 – Fort McMurray, Buffalo Lake Metis Settlement, Smoky Lake	
Lac La Biche County	Hylo	133.1	82.7		
Lac La Biche County		152.1	94.5	Highway 55 – Athabasca, Lac La Biche	
Gap in route
Lac La Biche County		160.2	99.5	Highway 881 – Lac La Biche, Fort McMurray	
Lac La Biche County	Beaver Lake	161.2	100.2		
Lac La Biche County		171.5	106.6	Township Road 672	Alternate route to Highway 881
Lac La Biche County		199.7	124.1	Torchwood Lake	Eastern terminus
1.000 mi = 1.609 km; 1.000 km = 0.621 mi: Concurrency terminus
