= Lac La Biche County =

- Specialized municipality
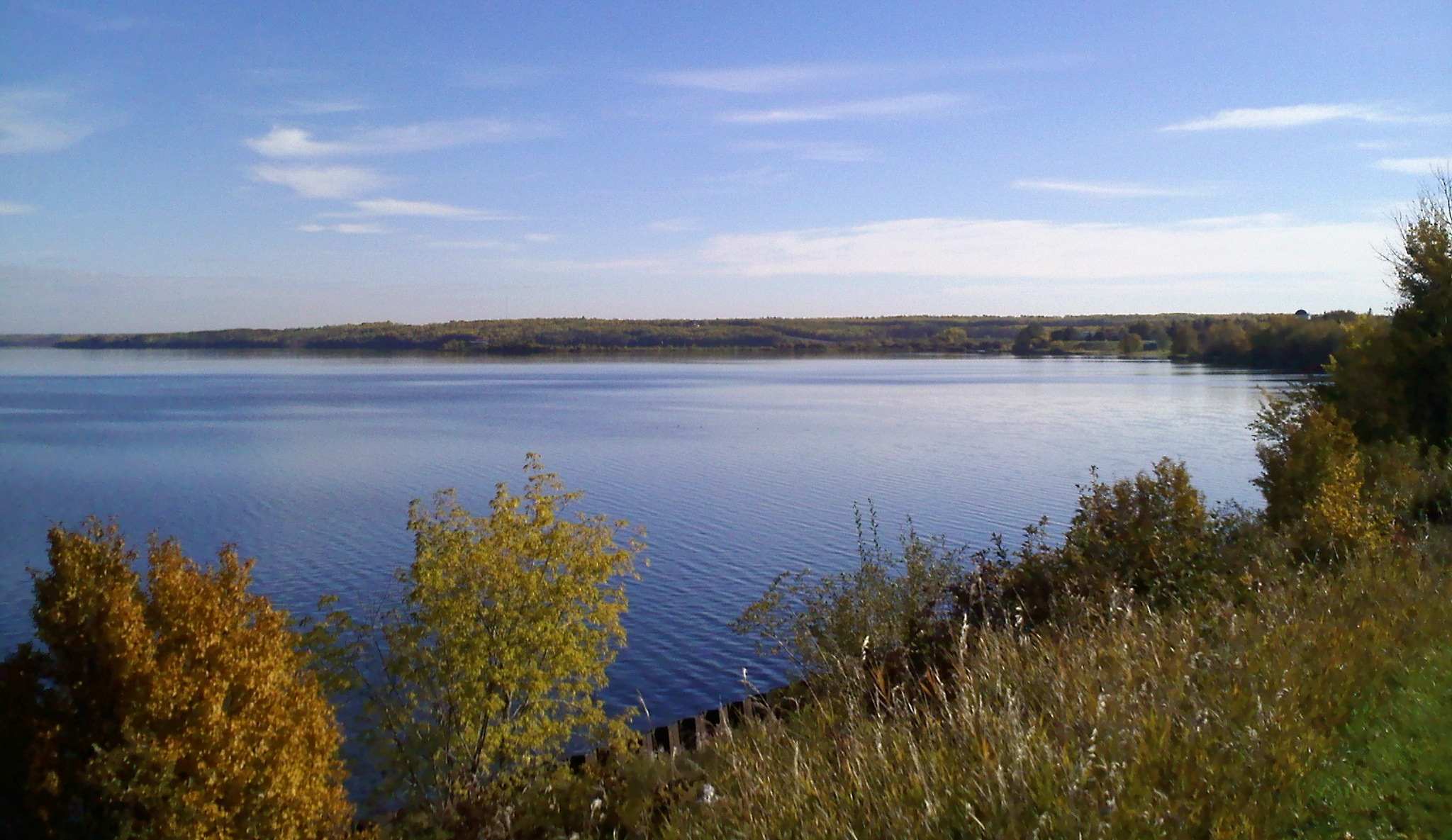
- Lac la Biche Lake

- Logo
- Motto: Welcoming By Nature

- Location within Alberta
- Coordinates: 54°46′7″N 111°58′50″W
- Country: Canada
- Province: Alberta
- Region: Northern Alberta
- Planning region: Lower Athabasca
- Incorporated
  - Municipal district: August 1, 2007
  - Specialized municipality: January 1, 2018

Government
  - Type: Mayor–Council
  - Mayor: Paul Reutov
  - Councillors: John Mondal | Warren Young | Tony Marczak | Blair Norton | Travis Lansing | Victor Toutant | David McDonald | Omer Moghrabi
  - CAO: Manny Deol
  - Administrative Office: Lac La Biche

Area (2021)
  - Land: 12,528.25 km^{2} (4,837.18 sq mi)
- Elevation: 574 m (1,882 ft)

Population (2021)
  - Total: 8,117
  - Municipal census (2016): 8,544
- Time zone: UTC−06:00 (Alberta Time)
- Postal code: T0A 2C0
- Area code: 780
- Website: laclabichecounty.com

Lac La Biche County is a specialized municipality within Division No. 12 in northern Alberta, Canada. It was established through the amalgamation of the Town of Lac La Biche and Lakeland County in 2007.

== History ==
Lac La Biche County was originally established as a municipal district on August 1, 2007 through the amalgamation of Lakeland County with the Town of Lac La Biche. Its predecessor municipal district, Lakeland County, was originally incorporated on July 1, 1998, formed from the northwestern part of the Municipal District of Bonnyville No. 87. Lac La Biche County converted from municipal district status to specialized municipality status on January 1, 2018.

== Geography ==
Lac La Biche County is in northeast Alberta. It borders the Regional Municipality (RM) of Wood Buffalo to the north; the Municipal District (MD) of Bonnyville No. 87 to the east (including the Cold Lake Air Weapons Range); the County of St. Paul No. 19 and Smoky Lake County to the south; the Kikino Metis Settlement and the Buffalo Lake Metis Settlement to the southwest; and Athabasca County and the MD of Opportunity No. 17 to the west. The eponymous lake, Lac la Biche, is in the southwest portion of Lac La Biche County while the Athabasca River forms the municipal boundary between it and the MD of Opportunity No. 17. Other water bodies include Beaver Lake, Pinehurst Lake, Seibert Lake, Touchwood Lake, and Winefred Lake (also partially within the RM of Wood Buffalo and the MD of Bonnyville No. 87).

=== Communities and localities ===
The following urban municipalities are surrounded by Lac La Biche County.

Cities

- none

Towns

- none

Villages

- none

Summer villages

- none

The following hamlets are located within Lac La Biche County.

Hamlets

- Beaver Lake
- Hylo
- Lac La Biche (dissolved from town status in the 2007 amalgamation, location of municipal office)
- Plamondon (dissolved from village status in 2002)
- Venice

The following localities are located within Lac La Biche County.

Localities

- Avenir
- Barnegat
- Behan
- Bone Town (designated place)
- Brièreville
- Craigend
- Deer Ridge Park Subdivision
- Elinor Lake Subdivision
- Fork Lake
- Helina
- Imperial Mills
- Lac La Biche Mission
- Lakeview Estates
- Margie
- Mile West Trailer Park
- Noral
- Normandeau
- Owl River
- Pelican Portage
- Philomena
- Pine Lane Trailer Court
- Pitlochrie
- Rich Lake
- Rossian or Russian Colony (designated place)
- Snug Cove
- Sunset Bay
- Tweedie

The Lac La Biche Settlement is also within Lac La Biche County.

First Nations have the following Indian reserves within Lac La Biche County.

Indian reserves

- Beaver Lake 131
- Heart Lake 167
- White Fish Lake 128 (portion, with balance split between Smoky Lake County and the County of St. Paul No. 19)

== Demographics ==
Federal census population history
| Year | Pop. | ±% |
|---|---|---|
| 2006 | 9,123 | — |
| 2011 | 8,402 | −7.9% |
| 2016 | 8,330 | −0.9% |
| 2021 | 8,117 | −2.6% |
Source: Statistics Canada

In the 2021 Census of Population conducted by Statistics Canada, Lac La Biche County had a population of 8,117 living in 3,120 of its 3,996 total private dwellings, a change of −2.6% from its 2016 population of 8,330. With a land area of 12,528.25 km^{2} (4,837.18 sq mi), it had a population density of 0.6/km^{2} (1.7/sq mi) in 2021.

The population of Lac La Biche County according to its 2019 municipal census is 8,654, a 1.3% change from its 2016 municipal census population of 8,544. The 2019 and 2016 municipal censuses also counted temporary residents. In 2019, 982 temporary residents were counted in comparison to 987 in 2016.

In the 2016 Census of Population conducted by Statistics Canada, Lac La Biche County had a population of 8,330 living in 3,076 of its 3,998 total private dwellings, a −0.9% change from its 2011 population of 8,402. With a land area of 12,572.29 km^{2} (4,854.19 sq mi), it had a population density of 0.7/km^{2} (1.7/sq mi) in 2016.

== Economy ==
Lac La Biche County's economy is based on the oil and gas industry, agriculture, and tourism. Some sawmills are also present.

== Attractions ==
The following provincial protected areas are within Lac La Biche County.

- Crow Lake Provincial Park
- Lakeland Provincial Park
- Sir Winston Churchill Provincial Park

Other attractions include Lac La Biche Mission, the Lac La Biche Golf and Country Club, and the following campgrounds.

- Diesel Own Hoot Cabins & Campgrounds
- Elinor Lake Resort
- Fish’N Friends Beaver Lake Campground
- Fork Lake
- Kinsmen Park Beaver Lake Group Camp Area
- Plamondon White Sands
- Spruce Point Resort
- Steepbank Wilderness Resort
- Young's Beach Campground

Community halls in Lac La Biche County include Craigend, Hylo, Owl River, Plamondon, and Rich Lake.

== Infrastructure ==
=== Transportation ===
==== Air ====
The full air-service Lac La Biche Airport is located west of the Hamlet of Lac La Biche, 0.7 km (0.43 mi) north of Highway 55. The airstrip is 5,700 ft (1,700 m) in length and 100 ft (30 m) wide and can accommodate 737 jets. Numerous carriers offer scheduled charter flights out of the airport. Alberta Air Spray Wildfire protection also uses the airstrip as a base accommodating large water tankers.

==== Rail ====
A rail line bisects Lac La Biche County, running through the hamlets of Hylo, Venice, and Lac La Biche. The rail line is operated by Canadian National.

==== Roads ====
The following provincial highways service Lac La Biche County.

- Highway 36 (Veterans Memorial Highway)
- Highway 55 (Northern Woods and Water Route)
- Highway 63
- Highway 663
- Highway 855
- Highway 858
- Highway 866
- Highway 867
- Highway 881

== Education ==
Northern Lights School Division No. 69

- Vera M Welsh Elementary (K-3)
- Aurora Middle School (4-8)
- J.A. Williams High School (9-12)
- Off Campus High School
- Portage College

Lakeland Catholic Schools

- Light of Christ Catholic School

Conseil Centre-Est

- École Sainte-Catherine (K-3)

== Media ==
Newspapers

Lac La Biche County is served by the weekly Lac La Biche Post and the Town and Country.

Radio

Two FM radio stations broadcast out of Lac La Biche – BOOM (CILB FM 103.5) and Aboriginal Radio (CFWE FM 89.9).

== See also ==
- List of communities in Alberta
- List of francophone communities in Alberta
- List of municipal districts in Alberta
