= Bone Town, Alberta =

Bone Town
- Designated place
- Location of Bone Town Bone Town (Canada)
- Coordinates: 54.711°N 111.966°W
- Country: Canada
- Province: Alberta
- Region: Northern Alberta
- Census division: 12
- Municipal district: Lac La Biche County

Government
  - Type: Unincorporated
  - Governing body: Lac La Biche County Council

Area
  - Land: 2.68 km^{2} (1.03 sq mi)

Population (2016)
  - Total: 58
- Time zone: UTC−06:00 (Alberta Time)
- Area codes: 780, 587, 825

Bone Town is an unincorporated community in Alberta, Canada within Lac La Biche County that is recognized as a designated place by Statistics Canada. It is located on the east side of Highway 36, 5 km (3.1 mi) south of Lac La Biche.

== Demographics ==
As a designated place in the 2016 Census of Population conducted by Statistics Canada, Bone Town recorded a population of 58 living in 21 of its 25 total private dwellings, a change of −34.1% from its 2011 population of 88. With a land area of 2.68 km^{2} (1.03 sq mi), it had a population density of 21.6/km^{2} (56.1/sq mi) in 2016.

As a designated place in the 2011 Census, Bone Town had a population of 88 living in 27 of its 34 total dwellings, a 31.3% change from its 2006 population of 67. With a land area of 2.51 km^{2} (0.97 sq mi), it had a population density of 35.06/km^{2} (90.8/sq mi) in 2011.

== See also ==
- List of communities in Alberta
