= Century Estates, Alberta =

Community in Alberta, Canada

Coordinates: 54°38′18″N 113°16′33″W

Location of Century Estates in Alberta

Century Estates is a locality in northern Alberta, Canada within Athabasca County. It is adjacent to the designated place of McNabb's, which is in the Hamlet of Colinton, Alberta.

== See also ==
- List of communities in Alberta
