= Lakeview Estates, Alberta =

Lakeview Estates, Alberta may refer to:

- Lakeview Estates, Strathcona County, a locality in Strathcona County, Alberta
- Lakeview Estates, Lac La Biche County, Alberta, a locality in Lac La Biche County, Alberta
- Lakeview Estates, Grande Prairie County No. 1, Alberta, a locality in Grande Prairie County No. 1, Alberta
