= McNabb's, Alberta =

McNabb's
- Designated place
- Location of Colinton in Alberta
- Coordinates: 54°37′16″N 113°15′37″W
- Country: Canada
- Province: Alberta
- Region: Northern Alberta
- Census division: 13
- Municipal district: Athabasca County
- Hamlet: Colinton

Government
  - Reeve: Doris Splane
  - Governing body: Athabasca County Council: Larry Armfelt; Christine Bilsky; Warren Griffin; Kevin Haines; Travais Johnson; Dwayne Rawson; Doris Splane; Penny Stewart; Denis Willcott

Area
  - Land: 0.66 km^{2} (0.25 sq mi)

Population (2016)
  - Total: 48
- Time zone: UTC−06:00 (Alberta Time)
- Website: www.athabascacounty.com

McNabb's is an unincorporated community in Alberta, Canada within Athabasca County that is recognized as a designated place by Statistics Canada. It is located on the north side of Highway 663, 3.5 km (2.2 mi) east of Highway 2.

As defined by Statistics Canada, McNabb's is adjacent to the western boundary of the designated place of Colinton. However, Athabasca County recognizes McNabb's as being part of the Hamlet of Colinton.

== Demographics ==
As a designated place in the 2016 Census of Population conducted by Statistics Canada, McNabb's recorded a population of 48 living in 21 of its 25 total private dwellings, a change of −18.6% from its 2011 population of 59. With a land area of 0.66 km^{2} (0.25 sq mi), it had a population density of 72.7/km^{2} (188.4/sq mi) in 2016.

As a designated place in the 2011 Census, McNabb's had a population of 59 living in 24 of its 25 total dwellings, a -9.2% change from its 2006 population of 65. With a land area of 0.66 km^{2} (0.25 sq mi), it had a population density of 89.4/km^{2} (232/sq mi) in 2011.

== See also ==
- List of communities in Alberta
- Century Estates, Alberta
