= Big Cascade Rapids =

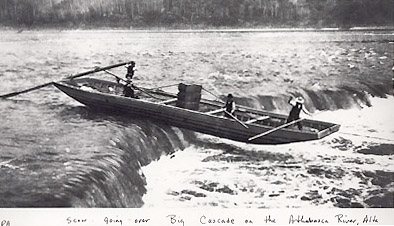
A scow shoots the Big Cascade Rapids, on the Athabasca River.

The Big Cascade Rapids is a navigational hazards on the Athabasca River, near Athabasca Landing, Alberta.

The river flows over a series of ridges, with a total height of 7 feet (2.1 m). Barges can shoot the rapids, during high water.

Cree people knew the rapids as "Nepe Kabatekik" (where the water falls).
