= Breynat =

Breynat may refer to:

- Breynat, Alberta, a hamlet in Alberta, Canada
- Breynat River, a tributary of the Harricana River, in Nord-du-Québec, Canada
  - Breynat Lake, one of the sources of the Breynat River
