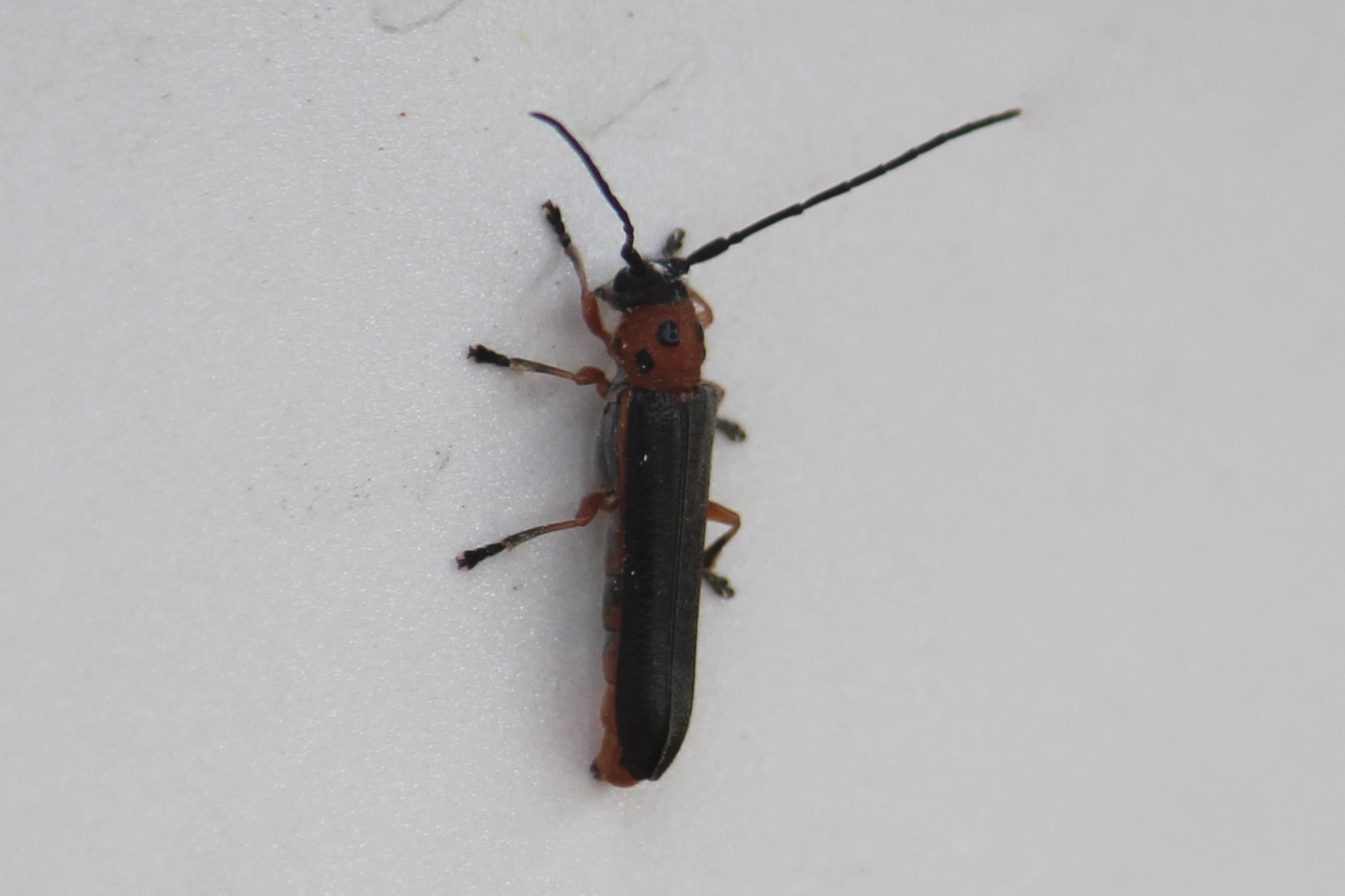
- Oberea schaumii in Sir Winston Churchill Provincial Park

Scientific classification
- Domain: Eukaryota
- Kingdom: Animalia
- Phylum: Arthropoda
- Class: Insecta
- Order: Coleoptera
- Suborder: Polyphaga
- Infraorder: Cucujiformia
- Family: Cerambycidae
- Genus: Oberea
- Species: O. schaumii

Binomial name
- Oberea schaumii LeConte, 1852

= Oberea schaumii =

Species of beetle

Oberea schaumii is a species of beetle in the family Cerambycidae. It was described by John Lawrence LeConte in 1852. It is known from Canada.
