= North Buck Lake (Alberta) =

Lake in Alberta, Canada

- Location within Alberta
- Location: Athabasca County, Alberta
- Coordinates: 54°40′37″N 112°32′46″W
- Basin countries: Canada
- Max. length: 8 km (5.0 mi)
- Max. width: 10 km (6.2 mi)
- Surface area: 19.0 km^{2} (7.3 sq mi)
- Average depth: 2.5 m (8 ft 2 in)
- Max. depth: 6.1 m (20 ft)
- Surface elevation: 614 m (2,014 ft)
- References: North Buck Lake

North Buck Lake is a lake in Alberta, Canada.
