= Amesbury, Alberta =

Amesbury
- Unincorporated
- Location of Amesbury in Alberta
- Coordinates: 55°4′52″N 112°29′50″W
- Country: Canada
- Province: Alberta
- Region: Northern Alberta
- Census division: 13
- Municipal district: Athabasca County

Government
  - Reeve: Doris Splane
  - Governing body: Athabasca County Council: Larry Armfelt; Christine Bilsky; Warren Griffin; Kevin Haines; Travais Johnson; Dwayne Rawson; Doris Splane; Penny Stewart; Denis Willcott
- Time zone: UTC-7 (MST)
  - Summer (DST): UTC-6 (MDT)
- Website: www.athabascacounty.com

Amesbury is an unincorporated community in northern Alberta, Canada within Athabasca County. It has an elevation is 1,886 ft.

== See also ==
- List of communities in Alberta
