= Lakeland County =

- Dissolved municipal district
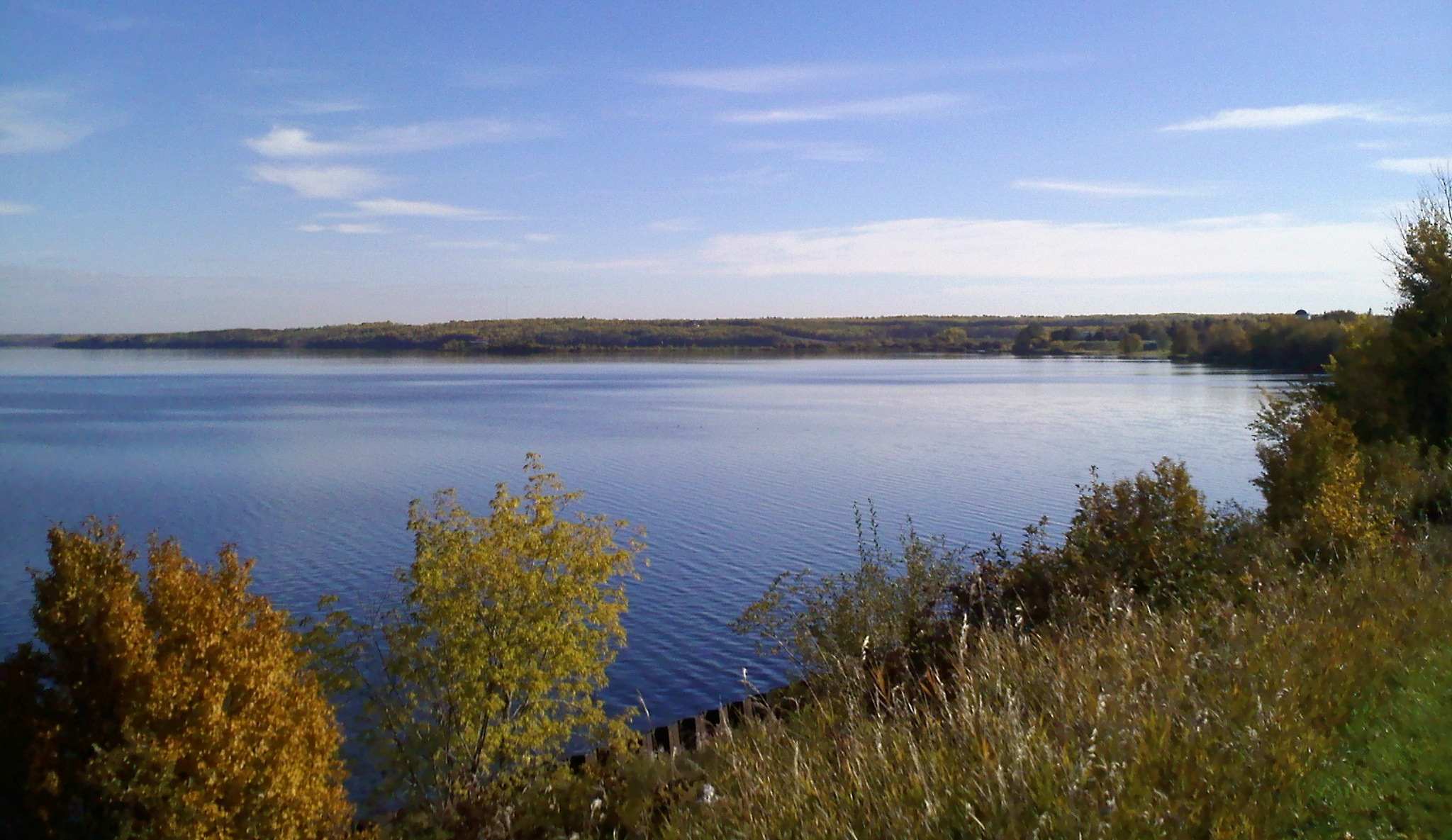
- Lac la Biche

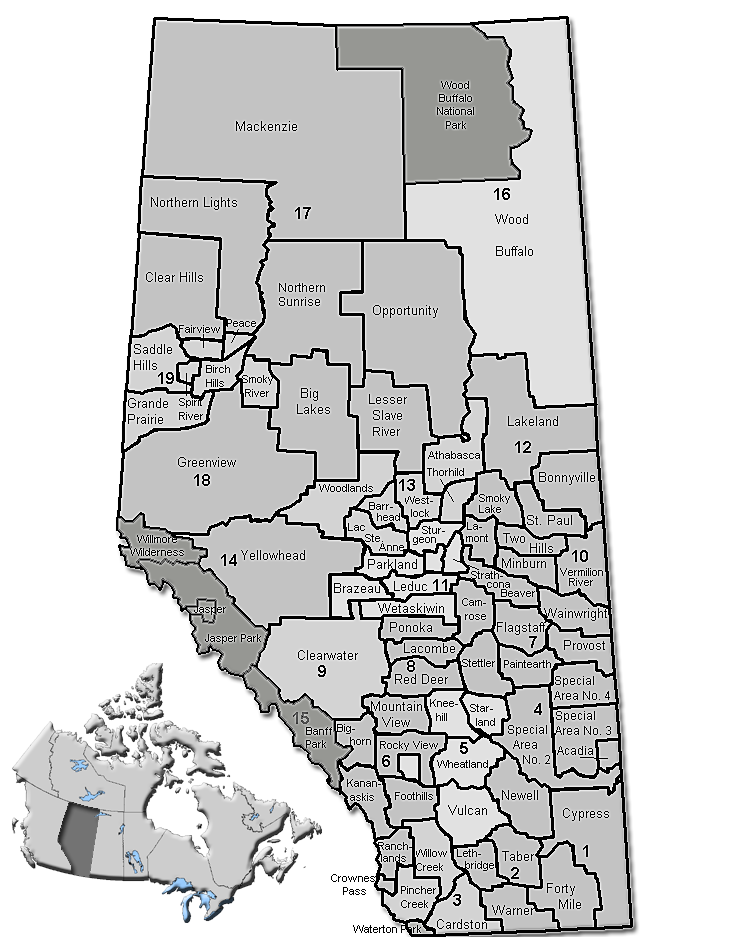
- Location of Lakeland County in Alberta
- Coordinates: 54°46′7″N 111°58′50″W
- Country: Canada
- Province: Alberta
- Region: Northern Alberta
- Census division: No. 12
- Incorporated: July 1, 1998
- Dissolved: August 1, 2007

Government
  - Former municipal seat: Lac La Biche

Area
  - Land: 16,294.77 km^{2} (6,291.45 sq mi)

Population (2011)
  - Total: 5,882
- Time zone: UTC−06:00 (Alberta Time)
- Area codes: 780, 587

Lakeland County was a municipal district in northern Alberta, Canada. It existed for just over nine years from 1998 to 2007.

== History ==
Lakeland County was originally formed as a municipal district on July 1, 1998 through the separation of lands from the Municipal District of Bonnyville No. 87. These lands included the Alberta portion of the Cold Lake Air Weapons Range. On May 1, 2002, Lakeland County absorbed Plamondon after it dissolved from village status. Just over five years later on August 1, 2007, Lakeland County and the Town of Lac La Biche amalgamated with each other to form a new specialized municipality named Lac La Biche County.

== Demographics ==
In the 2011 Census, the dissolved Lakeland County had a population of 5,882 living in 2,060 of its 2,850 total dwellings, a −7.6% change from its 2006 population of 6,365. With a land area of 16,294.77 km^{2} (6,291.45 sq mi), it had a population density of 0.4/km^{2} (0.9/sq mi) in 2011.

In the 2001 Census, Lakeland County had a population of 4,959, a 2.4% increase from its 1996 population of 4,842. Its 2001 population was subsequently adjusted to 5,306 to reflect the 2002 dissolution of the Village of Plamondon, which had a population of 347 in 2001.

== See also ==
- List of communities in Alberta
- List of municipal districts in Alberta
