= Seibert Lake (Alberta) =

Lake in Alberta, Canada

- Location within Alberta
- Location: Lac La Biche County, Alberta
- Coordinates: 54°43′54″N 111°18′20″W
- Basin countries: Canada
- Max. length: 10.2 km (6.3 mi)
- Max. width: 7.1 km (4.4 mi)
- Surface area: 37.9 km^{2} (14.6 sq mi)
- Average depth: 6.9 m (23 ft)
- Max. depth: 11 m (36 ft)
- Surface elevation: 624 m (2,047 ft)
- References: Seibert Lake

Seibert Lake is a lake in Alberta.
