= Ellscott =

- Hamlet
- Location of Ellscott in Alberta
- Coordinates: 54°30′11″N 112°54′4″W
- Country: Canada
- Province: Alberta
- Region: Northern Alberta
- Census division: 13
- Municipal district: Athabasca County

Government
  - Reeve: Doris Splane
  - Governing body: Athabasca County Council: Larry Armfelt; Christine Bilsky; Warren Griffin; Kevin Haines; Travais Johnson; Dwayne Rawson; Doris Splane; Penny Stewart; Denis Willcott

Area (2021)
  - Land: 1.28 km^{2} (0.49 sq mi)

Population (2021)
  - Total: 5
  - Density: 3.9/km^{2} (10/sq mi)
- Time zone: UTC−06:00 (Alberta Time)
- Website: www.athabascacounty.com

Ellscott is a hamlet in northern Alberta, Canada within Athabasca County. It is 3 kilometres (1.9 mi) east of Highway 63, 113 kilometres (70 mi) northeast of Edmonton. It was named after L.G. Scott, a purchasing agent for the Alberta and Great Waterways Railway.

== Demographics ==
Population history of Lowland Heights
| Year | Pop. | ±% |
|---|---|---|
| 1981 | 9 | — |
| 1986 | 13 | +44.4% |
| 1991 | 6 | −53.8% |
| 1991A | 6 | +0.0% |
| 1996 | 11 | +83.3% |
| 2001 | 10 | −9.1% |
| 2006 | 5 | −50.0% |
| 2011 | 0 | −100.0% |
| 2016 | 10 | — |
| 2021 | 5 | −50.0% |
Source: Statistics Canada

In the 2021 Census of Population conducted by Statistics Canada, Ellscott had a population of 5 living in 1 of its 3 total private dwellings, a change of −50% from its 2016 population of 10. With a land area of 1.28 km^{2} (0.49 sq mi), it had a population density of 3.9/km^{2} (10.1/sq mi) in 2021.

As a designated place in the 2016 Census of Population conducted by Statistics Canada, Ellscott had a population of 10 living in 5 of its 6 total private dwellings, an increase from its 2011 population of 0. With a land area of 0.67 km^{2} (0.26 sq mi), it had a population density of 14.9/km^{2} (38.7/sq mi) in 2016.

== See also ==
- List of communities in Alberta
- List of designated places in Alberta
- List of hamlets in Alberta
