= Steele Lake =

Lake in Alberta, Canada

- Location within Alberta
- Location: Municipal District of Lesser Slave River No. 124, Alberta, Canada
- Coordinates: 54°38′55″N 113°46′32″W
- Primary inflows: French Creek
- Primary outflows: French Creek
- Catchment area: Athabasca River
- Basin countries: Canada
- Max. length: 5.4 km (3.4 mi)
- Max. width: 3.2 km (2.0 mi)
- Surface area: 6.61 km^{2} (2.55 sq mi)
- Average depth: 3.2 m (10 ft)
- Max. depth: 6.1 m (20 ft)
- Surface elevation: 659 m (2,162 ft)
- References: Steele Lake

Steele Lake is a small sized lake in north central Alberta. It is located about 180 kilometres (110 mi) north of the city of Edmonton. Named after Ira John Steele, a soldier killed during World War I, the lake was originally called Cross Lake, for its distinctive shape, and lent that name to the surrounding Cross Lake Provincial Park.

Despite its small surface area, Steele Lake's local drainage basin is quite large, gathering water from the smaller September Lake, Frances Lake, Banana Lake, and other undistinguished ponds and creeks. The lake feeds into the Athabasca River catchment area, eventually reaching the Arctic Ocean.
