= Cross Lake Provincial Park =

Provincial park in Alberta, Canada

- Location within Alberta
- Interactive map of Cross Lake Provincial Park
- Location: Municipal District of Lesser Slave River No. 124, Alberta, Canada
- Nearest city: Athabasca, Westlock
- Coordinates: 54°39′11″N 113°47′40″W
- Area: 27.7 km^{2} (10.7 sq mi)
- Established: November 22, 1955
- Governing body: Alberta Tourism, Parks and Recreation

Cross Lake Provincial Park is a provincial park in Alberta, Canada, located 62 km (39 mi) west from Athabasca and 57 km (35 mi) north of Westlock.

The park is situated at an elevation of 655 m (2,149 ft) and has a surface of 27.7 km^{2} (10.7 sq mi). The park was established on November 22, 1955, and is maintained by Alberta Tourism, Parks and Recreation. It completely surrounds Steele Lake, which has a cruciform shape that led to the previous name of "Cross Lake", the source of the park's name.

== Activities ==
The following activities are available in the park:

- Birdwatching (white-throated sparrows, ruffed grouse, warbler, osprey, bald eagles, great blue herons, bohemian waxwings, pine grosbeaks and white-winged crossbills)
- Camping
- Canoeing and kayaking
- Cross-country skiing (7 kilometres (4.3 mi) of non-groomed trails)
- Fishing and ice fishing
- Hiking
- Horseshoes
- Power boating
- Swimming, water-skiing and windsurfing

== Climate ==
Climate data for Cross Lake Provincial Park
| Month | Jan | Feb | Mar | Apr | May | Jun | Jul | Aug | Sep | Oct | Nov | Dec | Year |
|---|---|---|---|---|---|---|---|---|---|---|---|---|---|
| Record high °C (°F) | 12.5 (54.5) | 16.0 (60.8) | 15.5 (59.9) | 28.9 (84.0) | 32.0 (89.6) | 33.5 (92.3) | 35.5 (95.9) | 34.0 (93.2) | 32.0 (89.6) | 27.5 (81.5) | 17.2 (63.0) | 16.0 (60.8) | 35.5 (95.9) |
| Mean daily maximum °C (°F) | −7.8 (18.0) | −3.7 (25.3) | 2.0 (35.6) | 10.8 (51.4) | 17.1 (62.8) | 20.6 (69.1) | 22.9 (73.2) | 22.0 (71.6) | 16.3 (61.3) | 9.2 (48.6) | −1.4 (29.5) | −6.4 (20.5) | 8.5 (47.3) |
| Daily mean °C (°F) | −13.9 (7.0) | −10.4 (13.3) | −4.6 (23.7) | 3.7 (38.7) | 9.6 (49.3) | 13.4 (56.1) | 16.0 (60.8) | 14.8 (58.6) | 9.3 (48.7) | 3.0 (37.4) | −6.5 (20.3) | −12.2 (10.0) | 1.9 (35.4) |
| Mean daily minimum °C (°F) | −19.9 (−3.8) | −17.2 (1.0) | −11.2 (11.8) | −3.4 (25.9) | 2.0 (35.6) | 6.3 (43.3) | 9.0 (48.2) | 7.5 (45.5) | 2.4 (36.3) | −3.2 (26.2) | −11.5 (11.3) | −18.1 (−0.6) | −4.8 (23.4) |
| Record low °C (°F) | −51 (−60) | −46.5 (−51.7) | −45.5 (−49.9) | −32.8 (−27.0) | −11 (12) | −4 (25) | −1.0 (30.2) | −3.5 (25.7) | −11 (12) | −27 (−17) | −38 (−36) | −46.7 (−52.1) | −51 (−60) |
| Average precipitation mm (inches) | 26.1 (1.03) | 14.7 (0.58) | 21.8 (0.86) | 29.9 (1.18) | 49.8 (1.96) | 97.2 (3.83) | 108.0 (4.25) | 68.1 (2.68) | 38.6 (1.52) | 27.5 (1.08) | 25.4 (1.00) | 20.9 (0.82) | 527.8 (20.78) |
| Average rainfall mm (inches) | 1.2 (0.05) | 0.5 (0.02) | 2.5 (0.10) | 17.8 (0.70) | 48.1 (1.89) | 97.2 (3.83) | 108.0 (4.25) | 68.0 (2.68) | 38.0 (1.50) | 16.8 (0.66) | 2.7 (0.11) | 0.7 (0.03) | 401.3 (15.80) |
| Average snowfall cm (inches) | 24.9 (9.8) | 14.2 (5.6) | 19.2 (7.6) | 12.2 (4.8) | 1.7 (0.7) | 0.0 (0.0) | 0.0 (0.0) | 0.1 (0.0) | 0.6 (0.2) | 10.8 (4.3) | 22.7 (8.9) | 20.2 (8.0) | 126.6 (49.8) |
Source: Environment Canada

== See also ==
- List of Alberta provincial parks
- List of Canadian provincial parks
- List of National Parks of Canada
