= Imperial Mills, Alberta =

Locality in Alberta, Canada

Coordinates: 54°59′56″N 111°44′02″W

Location of Imperial Mills Alberta

Imperial Mills is a locality in the Canadian province of Alberta, located in Lac La Biche County. It is approximately 33 kilometres (21 mi) northeast of Highway 55, 117 kilometres (73 mi) northwest of Cold Lake.
