= Perryvale =

- Hamlet
- Location of Perryvale in Alberta
- Coordinates: 54°28′4″N 113°23′16″W
- Country: Canada
- Province: Alberta
- Region: Northern Alberta
- Census division: 13
- Municipal district: Athabasca County

Government
  - Reeve: Doris Splane
  - Governing body: Athabasca County Council: Larry Armfelt; Christine Bilsky; Warren Griffin; Kevin Haines; Travais Johnson; Dwayne Rawson; Doris Splane; Penny Stewart; Denis Willcott

Area (2021)
  - Land: 0.39 km^{2} (0.15 sq mi)

Population (2021)
  - Total: 10
  - Density: 25.6/km^{2} (66/sq mi)
- Time zone: UTC−06:00 (Alberta Time)
- Website: www.athabascacounty.com

Perryvale is a hamlet in northern Alberta, Canada within Athabasca County It is 2 kilometres (1.2 mi) east of Highway 2, 104 kilometres (65 mi) north of Edmonton.

== Demographics ==
Population history of Perryvale
Year	Pop.	±%
1991	11	—
1996	13	+18.2%
2001	20	+53.8%
2006	10	−50.0%
2011	10	+0.0%
2016	20	+100.0%
2021	10	−50.0%
Source: Statistics Canada

In the 2021 Census of Population conducted by Statistics Canada, Perryvale had a population of 10 living in 5 of its 6 total private dwellings, a change of −50% from its 2016 population of 20. With a land area of 0.39 km^{2} (0.15 sq mi), it had a population density of 25.6/km^{2} (66.4/sq mi) in 2021.

As a designated place in the 2016 Census of Population conducted by Statistics Canada, Perryvale had a population of 20 living in 6 of its 6 total private dwellings, a change of 100% from its 2011 population of 10. With a land area of 0.39 km^{2} (0.15 sq mi), it had a population density of 51.3/km^{2} (132.8/sq mi) in 2016.

== See also ==
- List of communities in Alberta
- List of designated places in Alberta
- List of hamlets in Alberta
