= Beaver Lake (Alberta) =

Lake in Lac La Biche County, Alberta, Canada

- Location in Alberta
- Location: Lac La Biche County, near Lac La Biche, Alberta
- Coordinates: 54°42′21″N 111°48′59″W
- Primary outflows: Beaver River (Canada)
- Basin countries: Canada
- Max. length: 2.5 km (1.6 mi)
- Max. width: 0.5 km (0.31 mi)
- Surface area: 33.1 km^{2} (12.8 sq mi)
- Average depth: 7.1 m (23 ft)
- Max. depth: 15.2 m (50 ft)
- Surface elevation: 618 m (2,028 ft)

Beaver Lake is a lake in Alberta, Canada. It is located just southeast of the hamlet of Lac La Biche, Alberta. It is the source of Beaver River whose waters flow east to Hudson Bay. Just 4 kilometres (2.5 mi) to the north-west of Beaver Lake is the much larger Lac la Biche, which drains north to the Arctic Ocean.

== See also ==
- List of lakes in Alberta
