= Fork Lake, Alberta =

Coordinates: 54°28′20″N 111°37′18″W

Location of Fork Lake Alberta

Fork Lake is an unincorporated community in northern Alberta, Canada. It is located in Lac La Biche County, 6 kilometres (3.7 mi) south of Highway 55 and 93 kilometres (58 mi) west of Cold Lake.

The community was named for a nearby, fork-shaped lake.
