= Beaver Lake, Alberta =

Beaver Lake
- Hamlet
- Location of Beaver Lake Beaver Lake (Canada)
- Coordinates: 54°45′37″N 111°54′35″W
- Country: Canada
- Province: Alberta
- Region: Northern Alberta
- Census division: 12
- Municipal district: Lac La Biche County

Government
  - Type: Unincorporated
  - Governing body: Lac La Biche County Council

Area (2021)
  - Land: 1.1 km^{2} (0.42 sq mi)

Population (2021)
  - Total: 467
  - Density: 423.2/km^{2} (1,096/sq mi)
- Time zone: UTC−06:00 (Alberta Time)
- Area codes: 780, 587, 825

Beaver Lake is a hamlet in northern Alberta, Canada within Lac La Biche County. It is located on the shore of Beaver Lake, 4 kilometres (2.5 mi) east of Highway 36, approximately 116 kilometres (72 mi) northwest of Cold Lake.

== Demographics ==
Population history of Beaver Lake
Year	Pop.	±%
1966	50	—
1971	71	+42.0%
1976	47	−33.8%
1981	116	+146.8%
1986	125	+7.8%
1991	296	+136.8%
1991A	304	+2.7%
1996	351	+15.5%
2001	380	+8.3%
2006	265	−30.3%
2011	496	+87.2%
2016	482	−2.8%
2021	467	−3.1%
Population from 1986 is a combination of those living in Beaver Lake and Beaver Lake–Young's Point. Source: Statistics Canada

In the 2021 Census of Population conducted by Statistics Canada, Beaver Lake had a population of 467 living in 179 of its 198 total private dwellings, a change of −3.1% from its 2016 population of 482. With a land area of 1.1 km^{2} (0.42 sq mi), it had a population density of 424.5/km^{2} (1,099.6/sq mi) in 2021.

As a designated place in the 2016 Census of Population conducted by Statistics Canada, Beaver Lake had a population of 482 living in 171 of its 192 total private dwellings, a change of −2.8% from its 2011 population of 496. With a land area of 1.25 km^{2} (0.48 sq mi), it had a population density of 385.6/km^{2} (998.7/sq mi) in 2016.

Lac La Biche County's 2016 municipal census counted a population of 527 in Beaver Lake.

== See also ==
- List of communities in Alberta
- List of designated places in Alberta
- List of hamlets in Alberta
