= Narrow Lake (Alberta) =

Lake in Alberta, Canada

- Location within Alberta
- Location: Athabasca County, Alberta
- Coordinates: 54°37′10″N 113°36′57″W
- Basin countries: Canada
- Max. length: 14.2 km (8.8 mi)
- Max. width: 1.1 km (0.68 mi)
- Surface area: 1.14 km^{2} (0.44 sq mi)
- Average depth: 14.4 m (47 ft)
- Max. depth: 38 m (125 ft)
- Surface elevation: 698 m (2,290 ft)
- References: Narrow Lake

Narrow Lake is a lake in Alberta.
