= Colinton, Alberta =

Hamlet in northern Alberta

Colinton
- Hamlet
- Location of Colinton in Alberta
- Coordinates: 54°37′15″N 113°15′7″W
- Country: Canada
- Province: Alberta
- Region: Northern Alberta
- Census division: 13
- Municipal district: Athabasca County

Government
  - Reeve: Doris Splane
  - Governing body: Athabasca County Council: Larry Armfelt; Christine Bilsky; Warren Griffin; Kevin Haines; Travais Johnson; Dwayne Rawson; Doris Splane; Penny Stewart; Denis Willcott

Area (2021)
  - Land: 3.55 km^{2} (1.37 sq mi)

Population (2021)
  - Total: 169
  - Density: 47.6/km^{2} (123/sq mi)
- Time zone: UTC−06:00 (Alberta Time)
- Website: www.athabascacounty.com

Colinton is a hamlet in northern Alberta, Canada within Athabasca County. It is located 4 kilometres (2.5 mi) east of Highway 2 on Highway 663, approximately 121 kilometres (75 mi) north of Edmonton.

The Hamlet of Colinton consists of two designated places defined by Statistics Canada – Colinton and McNabb's – as well additional lands south of McNabb's that is not currently located within either designated place.

James Maurice Milne, owner of the land on which the railway station was built, named the hamlet after Colinton, Scotland, his birthplace. Previously Colinton was known as Kinnoull.

== Demographics ==
Population history of Colinton
Year	Pop.	±%
1941	145	—
1951	163	+12.4%
1956	145	−11.0%
1961	114	−21.4%
1966	129	+13.2%
1971	125	−3.1%
1976	126	+0.8%
1981	117	−7.1%
1986	147	+25.6%
1991	195	+32.7%
1991A	196	+0.5%
1996	196	+0.0%
2001	195	−0.5%
2006	187	−4.1%
2011	215	+15.0%
2016	201	−6.5%
2016R	254	+26.4%
2021	169	−33.5%
Source: Statistics Canada

In the 2021 Census of Population conducted by Statistics Canada, Colinton had a population of 169 living in 68 of its 100 total private dwellings, a change of −33.5% from its 2016 population of 254. With a land area of 3.55 km^{2} (1.37 sq mi), it had a population density of 47.6/km^{2} (123.3/sq mi) in 2021.

As a designated place in the 2016 Census of Population conducted by Statistics Canada, by combining the designated places of "Colinton" and "McNabb's", Colinton recorded a population of 249 living in 101 of its 118 total private dwellings, a change of −9.1% from its 2011 population of 274 . With a land area of 2.89 km^{2} (1.12 sq mi), it had a population density of 86.2/km^{2} (223.2/sq mi) in 2016.

== See also ==
- List of communities in Alberta
- List of designated places in Alberta
- List of hamlets in Alberta
