= Caslan =

- Hamlet
- Location of Caslan in Alberta
- Coordinates: 54°37′52″N 112°30′43″W
- Country: Canada
- Province: Alberta
- Region: Northern Alberta
- Census division: 13
- Municipal district: Athabasca County

Government
  - Reeve: Doris Splane
  - Governing body: Athabasca County Council: Larry Armfelt; Christine Bilsky; Warren Griffin; Kevin Haines; Travais Johnson; Dwayne Rawson; Doris Splane; Penny Stewart; Denis Willcott

Population (1991)
  - Total: 23
- Time zone: UTC−06:00 (Alberta Time)
- Website: www.athabascacounty.com

Caslan is a hamlet in central Alberta, Canada in Athabasca County. It is 21 kilometres (13 mi) south of Highway 55, 152 kilometres (94 mi) west of Cold Lake. The first baby in the area was born in 1921.

There is a general store that also sells alcohol and gasoline, and a Canada Post outlet. The hamlet also has an elementary school, a community centre, and a volunteer fire hall. Residences are on acreages and large lots. Some homes are just seasonal usage. The area is wooded. Coyotes, deer, and moose are common. Some species of birds stay during winter, which can be as cold as -30 Celsius.

== Demographics ==
Caslan recorded a population of 23 in the 1991 Census of Population conducted by Statistics Canada.

== See also ==
- List of communities in Alberta
- List of hamlets in Alberta
