= Breynat, Alberta =

Breynat
- Hamlet
- Location of Breynat in Alberta
- Coordinates: 55°8′26″N 112°29′35″W
- Country: Canada
- Province: Alberta
- Region: Northern Alberta
- Census division: 13
- Municipal district: Athabasca County

Government
  - Reeve: Doris Splane
  - Governing body: Athabasca County Council: Larry Armfelt; Christine Bilsky; Warren Griffin; Kevin Haines; Travais Johnson; Dwayne Rawson; Doris Splane; Penny Stewart; Denis Willcott

Population (1991)
  - Total: 22
- Time zone: UTC−06:00 (Alberta Time)
- Website: www.athabascacounty.com

Breynat is a hamlet in northern Alberta, Canada within Athabasca County. it is 1 kilometre (0.62 mi) west of Highway 63, 189 kilometres (117 mi) northeast of Edmonton.

== Demographics ==
Breynat recorded a population of 22 in the 1991 Census of Population conducted by Statistics Canada.

== See also ==
- List of communities in Alberta
- List of hamlets in Alberta
