= Meanook =

- Hamlet
- Location of Atmore in Alberta
- Coordinates: 54°34′41″N 113°19′30″W
- Country: Canada
- Province: Alberta
- Region: Northern Alberta
- Census division: 13
- Municipal district: Athabasca County

Government
  - Reeve: Doris Splane
  - Governing body: Athabasca County Council: Larry Armfelt; Christine Bilsky; Warren Griffin; Kevin Haines; Travais Johnson; Dwayne Rawson; Doris Splane; Penny Stewart; Denis Willcott

Area (2021)
  - Land: 0.6 km^{2} (0.23 sq mi)

Population (2021)
  - Total: 35
  - Density: 57.9/km^{2} (150/sq mi)
- Time zone: UTC−06:00 (Alberta Time)
- Website: www.athabascacounty.com

Meanook is a hamlet in northern Alberta, Canada within Athabasca County. It is 3 kilometres (1.9 mi) east of Highway 2, 116 kilometres (72 mi) north of Edmonton.

== Demographics ==
Population history of Meanook
| Year | Pop. | ±% |
|---|---|---|
| 1976 | 25 | — |
| 1981 | 19 | −24.0% |
| 1986 | 14 | −26.3% |
| 1991 | 19 | +35.7% |
| 1996 | 14 | −26.3% |
| 2001 | 20 | +42.9% |
| 2006 | 15 | −25.0% |
| 2011 | 25 | +66.7% |
| 2016 | 30 | +20.0% |
| 2021 | 35 | +16.7% |
Source: Statistics Canada

In the 2021 Census of Population conducted by Statistics Canada, Meanook had a population of 35 living in 12 of its 14 total private dwellings, a change of 16.7% from its 2016 population of 30. With a land area of 0.6 km^{2} (0.23 sq mi), it had a population density of 58.3/km^{2} (151.1/sq mi) in 2021.

As a designated place in the 2016 Census of Population conducted by Statistics Canada, Meanook had a population of 30 living in 13 of its 15 total private dwellings, a change of 20% from its 2011 population of 25. With a land area of 0.6 km^{2} (0.23 sq mi), it had a population density of 50.0/km^{2} (129.5/sq mi) in 2016.

== See also ==
- List of communities in Alberta
- List of designated places in Alberta
- List of hamlets in Alberta
- Meanook Magnetic Observatory
