= Hylo =

- Hamlet
- Location of Hylo Hylo (Canada)
- Coordinates: 54°40′39″N 112°12′41″W
- Country: Canada
- Province: Alberta
- Region: Northern Alberta
- Census division: 12
- Specialized municipality: Lac La Biche County

Government
  - Type: Unincorporated
  - Governing body: Lac La Biche County Council

Population (2016)
  - Total: 33
- Time zone: UTC−06:00 (Alberta Time)
- Area codes: 780, 587, 825

Hylo is a hamlet in northern Alberta, Canada within Lac La Biche County. It is located approximately 16 kilometres (9.9 mi) south of Highway 55 and 133 kilometres (83 mi) west of Cold Lake.

== Demographics ==
Lac La Biche County's 2016 municipal census counted a population of 31 in Hylo.

== See also ==
- List of communities in Alberta
- List of hamlets in Alberta
