= Touchwood Lake (Alberta) =

Lake in Alberta, Canada

- Location within Alberta
- Location: Lac La Biche County, Alberta
- Coordinates: 54°48′34″N 111°24′43″W
- Basin countries: Canada
- Max. length: 12 km (7.5 mi)
- Max. width: 4.9 km (3.0 mi)
- Surface area: 29.0 km^{2} (11.2 sq mi)
- Average depth: 14.8 m (49 ft)
- Max. depth: 54.54 m (178.9 ft)
- Surface elevation: 631 m (2,070 ft)
- References: Touchwood Lake

Touchwood Lake is a lake in northeastern Alberta. It is located in Lakeland Provincial Park. A popular camping spot for people around the area and all over Alberta. Part of the Beaver River system, it is a fairly small lake with many creeks and other lakes attached to it.
