= Athabasca, Alberta =

Athabasca Athabasca Landing (1877–1913)
- Town
- Town of Athabasca
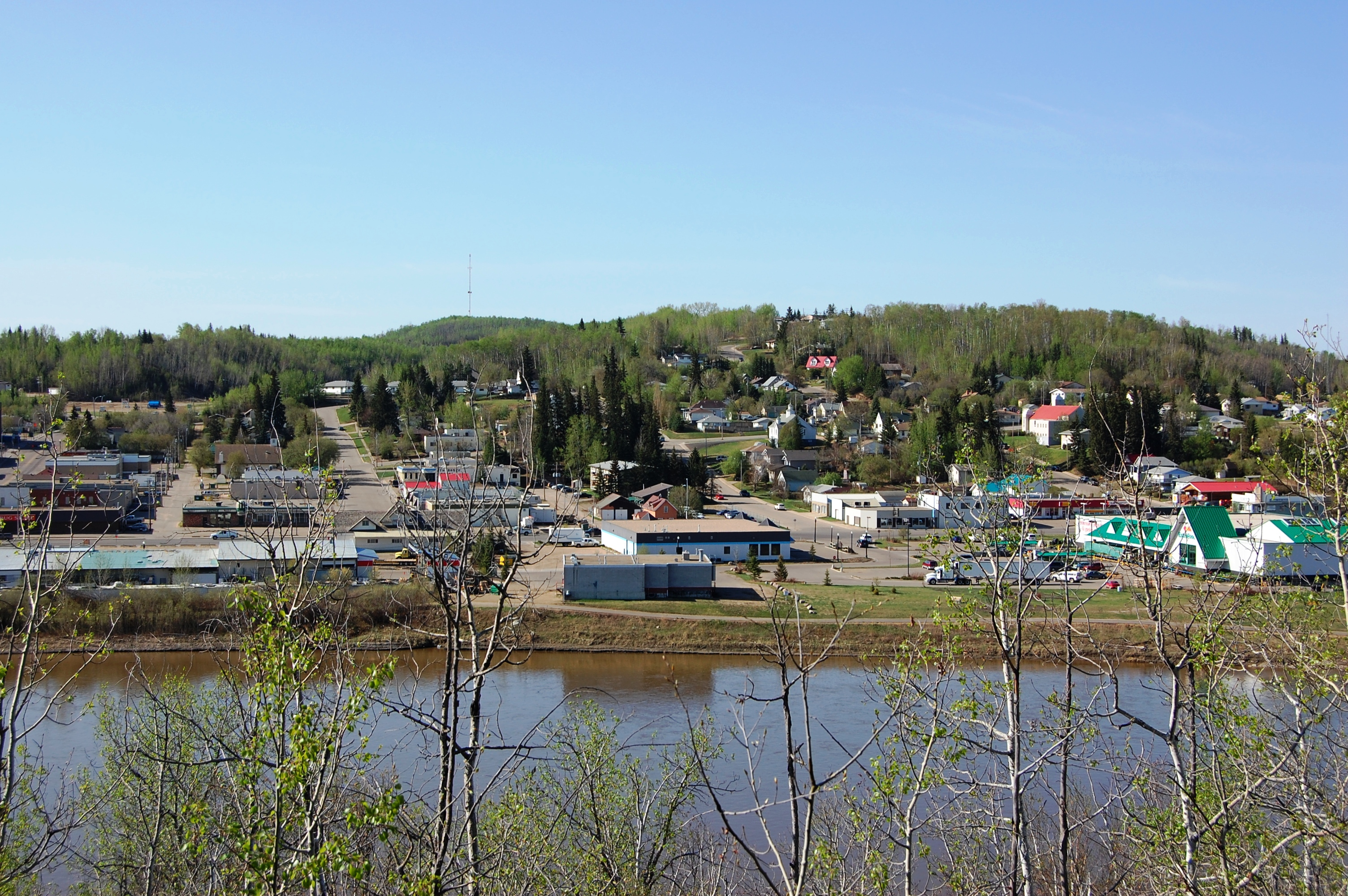
- Motto: Gateway to the Great New North
- Town boundaries

- Location in Athabasca County Location in Alberta Athabasca (Canada) Athabasca (North America)
- Coordinates: 54°43′11″N 113°17′08″W
- Country: Canada
- Province: Alberta
- Region: Northern Alberta
- Planning region: Upper Athabasca
- Municipal district: Athabasca County
- Founded: 1877
- Incorporated
  - Village: May 18, 1905 (as Athabasca Landing)
  - Town: September 19, 1911
  - Name change: August 4, 1913

Government
  - Mayor: Robert Balay
  - Governing body: Athabasca Town Council
  - CAO: Rachel Ramey
  - MP: Shannon Stubbs (Conservative - Lakeland)
  - MLA: Glenn van Dijken (UCP - Athabasca-Barrhead-Westlock)

Area (2021)
  - Land: 17.79 km^{2} (6.87 sq mi)
- Elevation: 533 m (1,749 ft)

Population (2021)
  - Total: 2,759
  - Density: 155.1/km^{2} (402/sq mi)
- Time zone: UTC−06:00 (Alberta Time)
- Forward sortation area: T9S
- Area codes: 780, 587, 825
- Website: athabasca.ca

Athabasca /ˌæθəˈbæskə/ (2021 population 2,759), originally named Athabasca Landing, is a town in northern Alberta, Canada. It is located 145 km (90 mi) north of Edmonton at the intersection of Highway 2 and Highway 55, on the banks of the Athabasca River. It is the centre of Athabasca County. It was known as Athabasca Landing prior to August 4, 1913.

== History ==
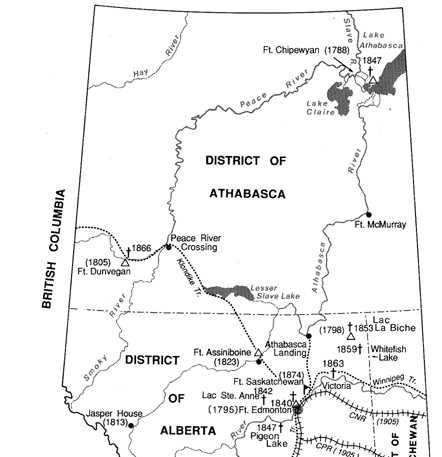
Northern Alberta During the Territorial Period.

The name "Athabasca" is of Cree origin. Early spellings: Araubaska (Peter Pond) and Athapescow (Arrowsmith). Various interpretations of the meaning: "where there are reeds" (Douglas); "meeting place of many waters" (Voorhis). The town was first called Athabasca Landing about 1889; the name changed to Athabaska in 1904, and then changed back to Athabasca in 1948. The provisional district of Athabasca was established in 1882, encompassing the northern parts of modern Alberta and Saskatchewan.

Unlike many other towns in Alberta, Athabasca predates the Canadian Pacific Railway. Athabasca lies on a southern protrusion of the Athabasca River. During the fur trade era, when rivers were the principal means of transportation, the Athabasca–Edmonton trail connected two different drainage basins. The Athabasca River flows north and is part of the Mackenzie River watershed, which flows into the Arctic Ocean. Edmonton is on the North Saskatchewan River. Its waters flow into the Nelson River, which empties into the Hudson Bay. Edmonton was in Rupert's Land, but Athabasca was not.

Athabasca was the terminus of the Edmonton to Athabasca Landing trail, which allowed goods to be portaged back and forth between river systems. Once agricultural settlement occurred, the trail continued to serve a similar purpose. Eventually, road and rail links were established following the same path.

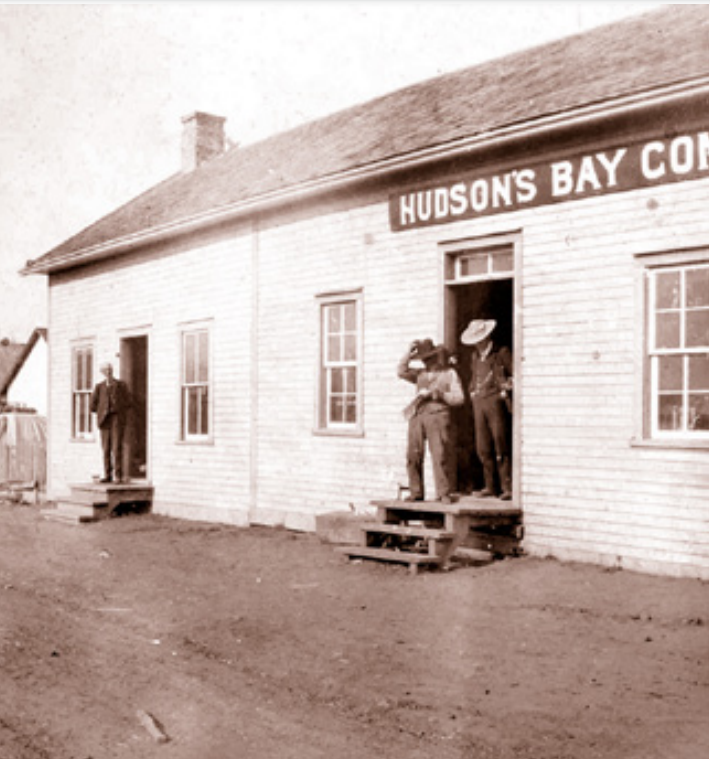
Hudson's Bay Company store 1886

In 1876, the Hudson's Bay Company (HBC) built a warehouse at Athabasca Landing to facilitate the supply route to Lesser Slave Lake. The site was expanded in 1886 with a store, house, and new larger warehouse, and it became a full trading post. Further expansion included a stable, powder magazine, workshop and storeman's house. By 1889, it had become the HBC's headquarters of northern transport.

The North-West Mounted Police stationed officers at Athabasca Landing for the summer of 1892, due to increased traffic on the trail. Inspector D.M. Howard, and eight constables, built a permanent post in 1893.

In 1912, the HBC had the steamers Slave River and Athabasca River built at Athabasca Landing for travel on the Athabasca and Peace Rivers.

A massive forest fire in August 1913 destroyed a large portion of the town, including 30 businesses. There was no loss of life. Rebuilding of the town began immediately. The HBC post was rebuilt in 1914 and operated until 1924.

The Athabasca Heritage Society put up signs through the downtown as well as along the riverfront that explain and depict the history of the town. It has also published a historical walking tour that is available from the town office, library and visitor information center.

== Geography ==
The Town of Athabasca is located on the forested banks of the Athabasca River in northern Alberta. The area is traditional ancestral land of the Cree and Métis peoples; the town is situated in Treaty 6 area (signed in 1876), and is adjacent to Treaty 8 territory (signed in 1899).

=== Lakes ===
- Narrow Lake

=== Climate ===
Athabasca experiences a humid continental climate (Köppen climate classification Dfb) that borders on a subarctic climate (Köppen Dfc). The highest temperature ever recorded in Athabasca was 38.3 °C (101 °F) on July 18, 1941. The coldest temperature ever recorded was −54.4 °C (−66 °F) on January 11, 1911.

Climate data for Athabasca, 1981–2010 normals, extremes 1900–present
Month	Jan	Feb	Mar	Apr	May	Jun	Jul	Aug	Sep	Oct	Nov	Dec	Year
Record high °C (°F)	13.3 (55.9)	16.1 (61.0)	20.0 (68.0)	31.7 (89.1)	34.4 (93.9)	34.5 (94.1)	38.3 (100.9)	34.5 (94.1)	32.2 (90.0)	28.9 (84.0)	21.1 (70.0)	15.0 (59.0)	38.3 (100.9)
Mean daily maximum °C (°F)	−8.5 (16.7)	−4.8 (23.4)	1.2 (34.2)	10.2 (50.4)	16.8 (62.2)	20.4 (68.7)	22.7 (72.9)	21.6 (70.9)	15.9 (60.6)	8.7 (47.7)	−2.3 (27.9)	−7.2 (19.0)	7.9 (46.2)
Daily mean °C (°F)	−13.4 (7.9)	−10.4 (13.3)	−4.3 (24.3)	3.9 (39.0)	10.3 (50.5)	14.3 (57.7)	16.6 (61.9)	15.4 (59.7)	9.9 (49.8)	3.5 (38.3)	−6.3 (20.7)	−11.9 (10.6)	2.3 (36.1)
Mean daily minimum °C (°F)	−18.1 (−0.6)	−15.7 (3.7)	−9.7 (14.5)	−2.3 (27.9)	3.8 (38.8)	8.2 (46.8)	10.5 (50.9)	9.2 (48.6)	3.9 (39.0)	−1.7 (28.9)	−10.4 (13.3)	−16.5 (2.3)	−3.2 (26.2)
Record low °C (°F)	−54.4 (−65.9)	−53.9 (−65.0)	−43.9 (−47.0)	−31.7 (−25.1)	−12.2 (10.0)	−7.2 (19.0)	−5.0 (23.0)	−6.7 (19.9)	−15.0 (5.0)	−26.7 (−16.1)	−45.6 (−50.1)	−48.9 (−56.0)	−54.4 (−65.9)
Average precipitation mm (inches)	22.5 (0.89)	14.9 (0.59)	17.2 (0.68)	25.7 (1.01)	49.0 (1.93)	87.4 (3.44)	103.7 (4.08)	58.1 (2.29)	37.5 (1.48)	22.1 (0.87)	20.6 (0.81)	20.0 (0.79)	478.7 (18.85)
Average rainfall mm (inches)	0.6 (0.02)	0.6 (0.02)	1.4 (0.06)	15.5 (0.61)	46.5 (1.83)	87.4 (3.44)	103.7 (4.08)	58.1 (2.29)	37.1 (1.46)	14.1 (0.56)	1.9 (0.07)	0.4 (0.02)	367.3 (14.46)
Average snowfall cm (inches)	21.9 (8.6)	14.3 (5.6)	15.9 (6.3)	10.2 (4.0)	2.5 (1.0)	0 (0)	0 (0)	0 (0)	0.4 (0.2)	8.0 (3.1)	18.7 (7.4)	19.6 (7.7)	111.4 (43.9)
Average precipitation days (≥ 0.2 mm)	8.3	6.5	6.6	6.4	9.7	14.0	15.2	12.4	10.4	7.4	7.0	8.9	112.8
Average rainy days (≥ 0.2 mm)	0.3	0.5	0.9	4.1	9.3	14.0	15.2	12.4	10.0	5.9	1.0	0.5	74.0
Average snowy days (≥ 0.2 cm)	8.1	6.1	5.8	2.4	0.7	0.0	0.0	0.0	0.4	1.8	6.2	8.4	39.9
Source: Environment Canada

== Demographics ==
In the 2021 Census of Population conducted by Statistics Canada, the Town of Athabasca had a population of 2,759 living in 1,155 of its 1,325 total private dwellings, a change of −6.9% from its 2016 population of 2,965. With a land area of 17.79 km^{2} (6.87 sq mi), it had a population density of 155.1/km^{2} (401.7/sq mi) in 2021.

In the 2016 Census of Population conducted by Statistics Canada, the Town of Athabasca recorded a population of 2,965 living in 1,194 of its 1,313 total private dwellings, a −0.8% change from its 2011 population of 2,990. With a land area of 17.65 km^{2} (6.81 sq mi), it had a population density of 168.0/km^{2} (435.1/sq mi) in 2016.

== Education ==
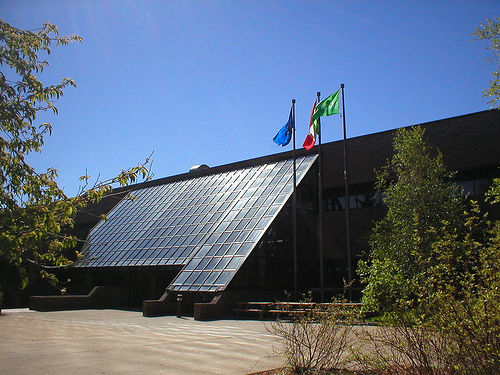
Athabasca University

The town is home to Athabasca University, a major centre for distance education and the town's second largest employer.

Aspen View Public Schools (AVPS) or originally known as Aspen View School Division https://www.aspenview.org/ is the school division providing education from Kindergarten to Grade 12, with schools within the Town of Athabasca, Athabasca County, Village of Boyle as well as Grassland, Smoky Lake, Rochester, Smith, Thorhild and Vilna.

Head Office is located in the Athabasca University Campus in the Town of Athabasca.

== Media ==
=== Newspapers ===
Local news is provided by the Athabasca Advocate, an award-winning weekly newspaper. The Athabasca Advocate began publishing in 1982.

Athabasca's original newspaper was the Athabasca Echo. The Athabasca Echo was published from 1928 to 1986.

=== Radio ===
Athabasca is home to one FM radio station. Boom 94.1 (FM 94.1, CKBA-FM.) is owned by Stingray Radio and broadcasts a classic hits format.

The CKUA Radio Network also has a repeater broadcasting from Athabasca at FM 98.3.

== In literature ==
- James A. Michener describes a group of pioneers arriving to the town in 1897 to buy a boat in his novel Journey (1989)
- Robert W. Service visited Athabasca in 1911. His visit inspired several of his poems, such as The Man from Athabaska and Athabaska Dick.

== Notable people ==
- Bryan Mudryk – TSN TV personality
- Jay Onrait – TSN TV personality
- George Ryga – playwright, poet
- Kay Heim – All-American Girls Professional Baseball Player
