= Lac La Biche, Alberta =

Lac La Biche
- Urban service area (hamlet)
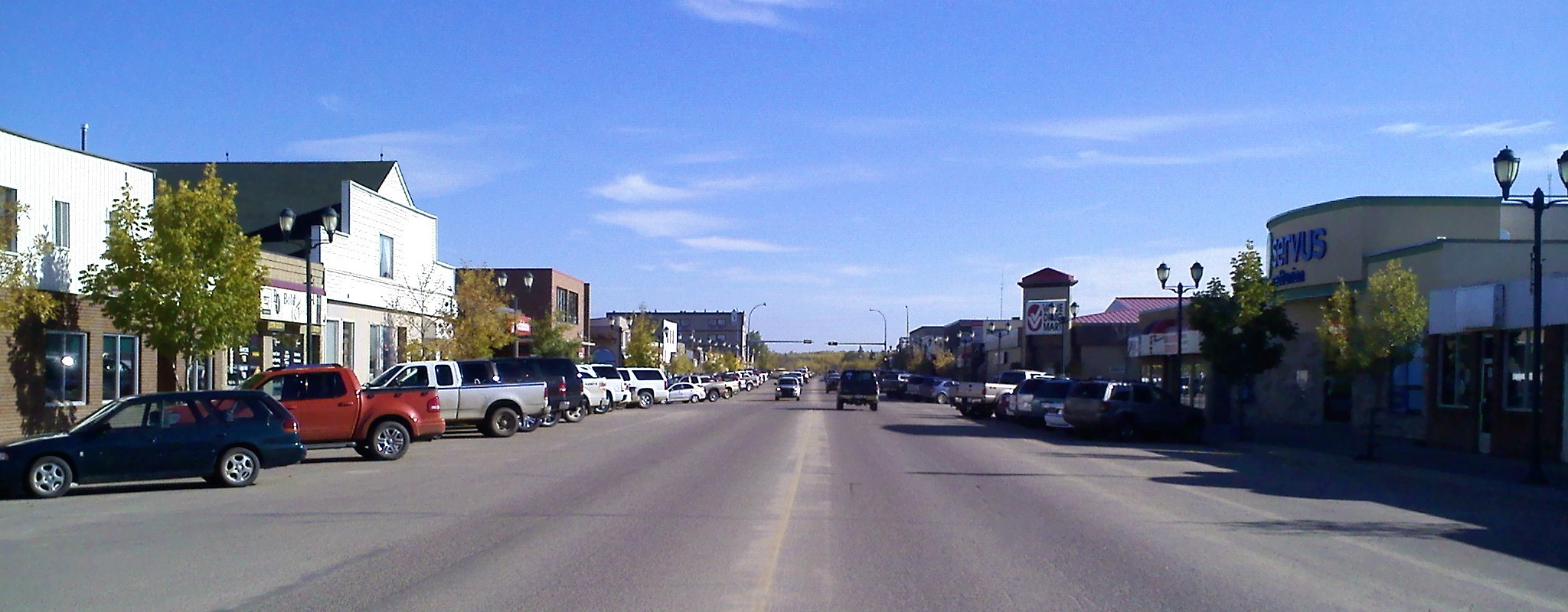
- Main street
- Motto: Welcoming by nature
- Location within Lac La Biche County

- Location of Lac La Biche in Alberta Lac La Biche (Canada) Lac La Biche (North America)
- Coordinates: 54°46′13″N 111°58′45″W
- Country: Canada
- Province: Alberta
- Region: Northern Alberta
- Planning region: Lower Athabasca
- Specialized municipality: Lac La Biche County
- Founded: October 4, 1798
- Dissolved: August 1, 2007

Government
  - Mayor: Omer Moghrabi
  - Governing body: Lac La Biche County Council: Darlene Beniuk; Colette Borgun; Sterling Johnson; George L'Heureux; Omer Moghrabi; Charlyn Moore; Jason Stedman; Lorin Tkachuk; Colin Cote

Area (2021)
  - Land: 68.39 km^{2} (26.41 sq mi)
- Elevation: 560 m (1,840 ft)

Population (2021)
  - Total: 3,215
- Time zone: UTC−06:00 (Alberta Time)
- Postal code span: T0A 2C0-T0A 2C2 & T0A 3Z0
- Area code: -1+780
- Highways: Highway 55; Highway 36; Highway 881
- Waterway: Lac la Biche
- Website: www.laclabichecounty.com

National Historic Site of Canada
- Official name: Notre Dame des Victoires / Lac La Biche Mission National Historic Site of Canada
- Designated: 1989

Lac La Biche (/ˌlæk lə ˈbɪʃ/ LAK lə BISH) is an urban service area in Lac La Biche County within northeastern Alberta, Canada.

It is approximately 220 km (140 mi) northeast of the provincial capital, Edmonton. Previously incorporated as a town, Lac La Biche amalgamated with Lakeland County to form Lac La Biche County on August 1, 2007. Between 2007 and 2017, it was designated as a hamlet within Lac La Biche County.

== Etymology ==
The indigenous peoples of the area refer to the lake as Elk Lake (Plains Cree: wâwâskesiwisâkahikan, Chipewyan: tzalith tway). The earliest Europeans translated this name into English as "Red Deer Lake" and in French as "lac la Biche" ("lake of the doe"). Over time, the French name came to be used in English as well.

== History ==
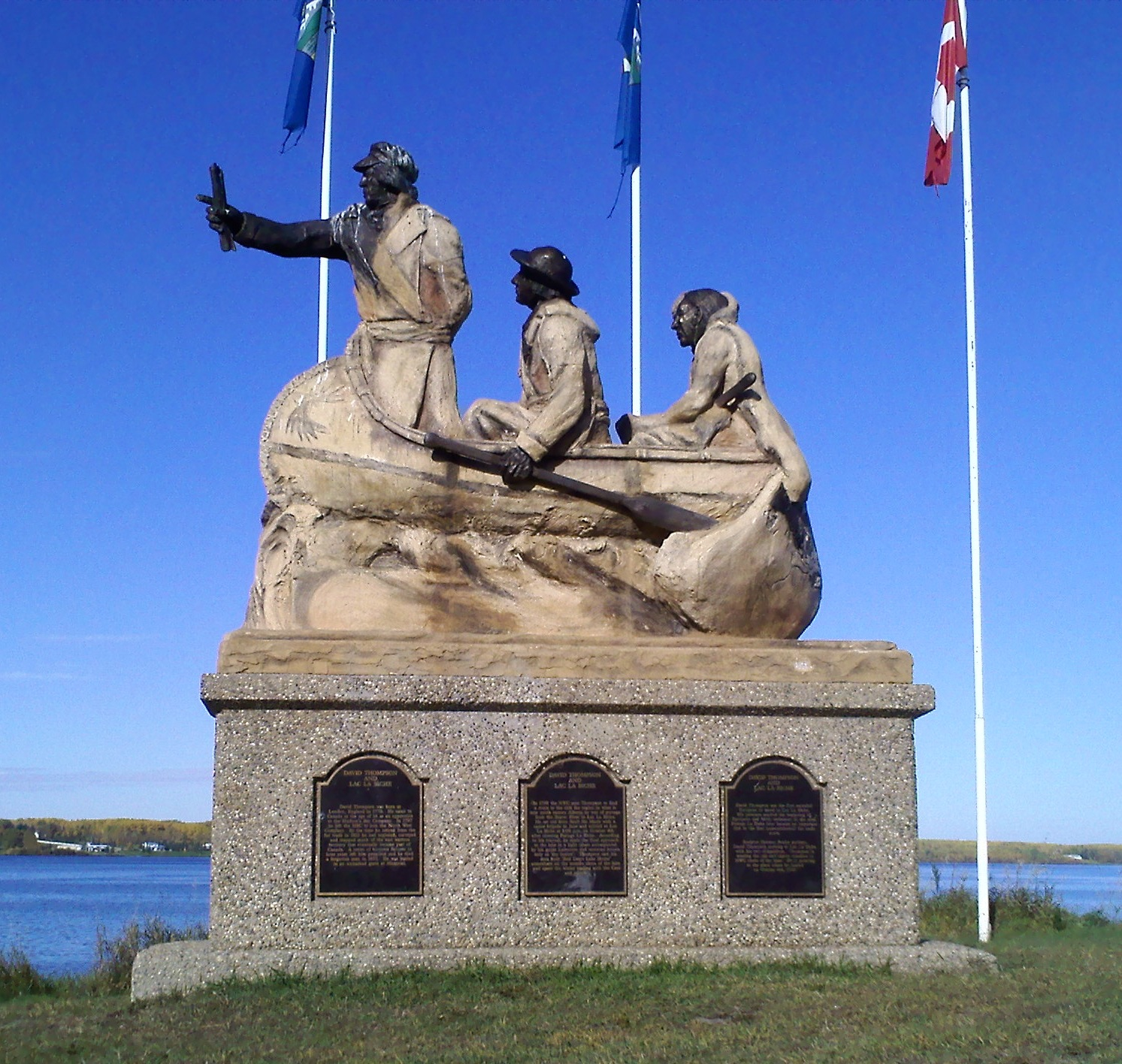
Statue of David Thompson

=== Historic voyageur highway ===
Lac La Biche was on the historical voyageur route that linked the Athabaskan region to Hudson Bay. David Thompson and George Simpson used the fur trade route via the Beaver River from the main Methye Portage route that reached the Athabasca River. Thompson was the first known European to record his sojourn on Lac La Biche. Thompson, who referred to the lake as Red Deers Lake, arrived October 4, 1798, and overwintered there. He entered copious notes in his diary on the Nahathaway (the Cree), their customs, traditions, and the Western Forest Land, including the large supply of whitefish and beaver.

=== Fur trade posts ===
Although the Montreal-based North West Company was already active in the area, Thompson established the first permanent settlement in Lac La Biche on his 1798 trip, a Hudson's Bay Company trading post which he named Red Deers Lake House. In 1799, Peter Fidler arrived in the area after Thompson's departure, and as the post. This new structure was known as Greenwich House. It was also abandoned by 1801, but Lac La Biche was established as a permanent place of residence for some French-Canadian and Métis freetraders and their families. Fur trade activity continued unbroken, due to the importance of the portage, and Lac La Biche was visited by fur traders such as Gabriel Franchère and Ross Cox. David Thompson returned in 1812.

Another temporary Hudson's Bay Company post was erected in 1817, but the portage was abandoned by the company in 1825. Almost no written records exist for the following two decades.

On 26 April 1885, during the North-West Rebellion, the Hudson's Bay Company post in Lac La Biche was raided by Cree forces.

=== Oblate mission ===
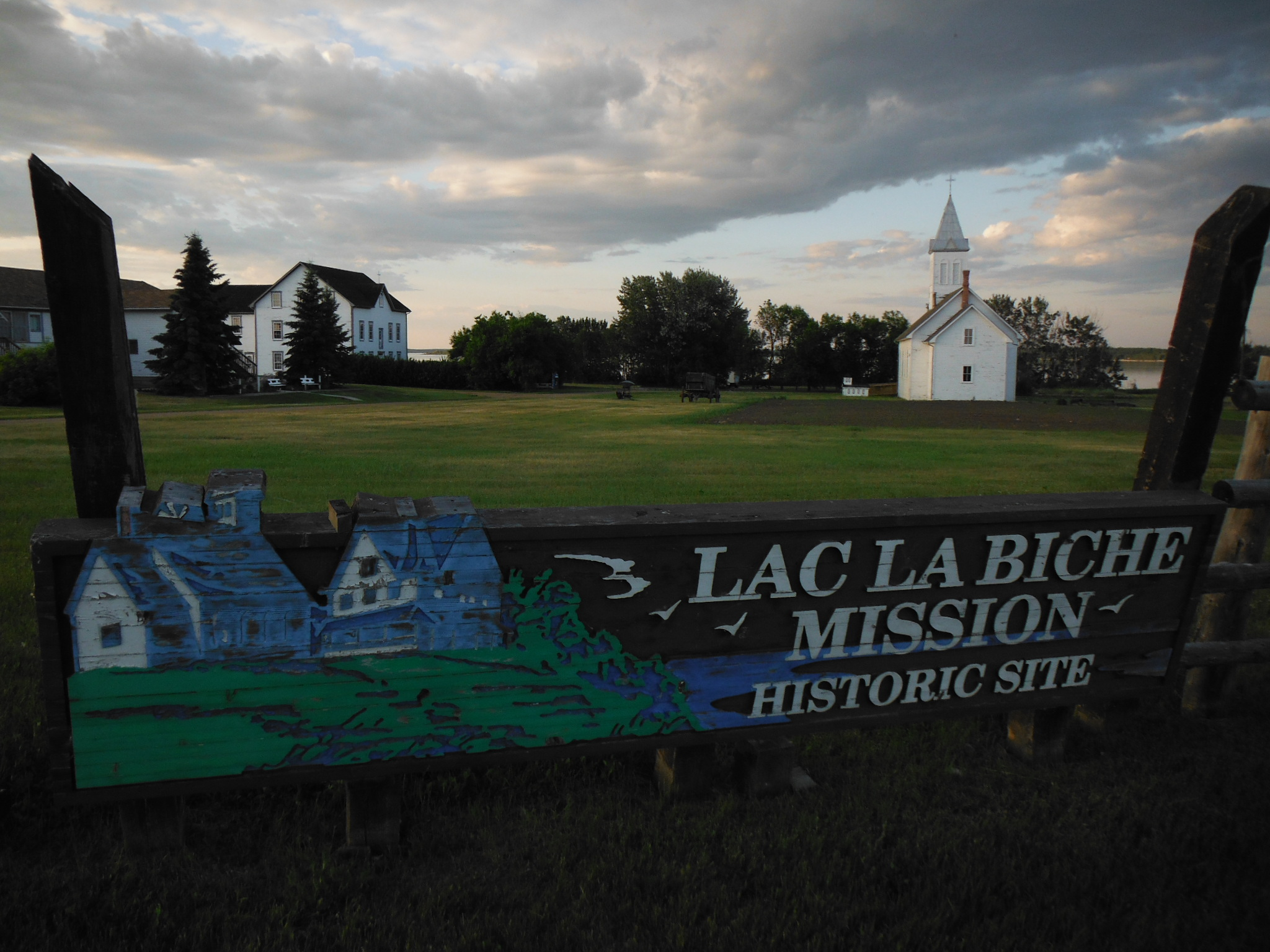
Lac La Biche Mission

A Roman Catholic mission was established in 1853 by Oblate missionaries. Historian Paul Robert Magocsi notes how the settlement grew over the next few decades:

"The French-speaking element, mostly from Red River, coalesced around the Mission. It formed a community that was tightly knit, even though the influence of the church lessened and the trend was towards marrying out and establishing nuclear families. Living was largely off the land; logging and road work provided intermittent wage labour. Many of the adults were trilingual, speaking French and Cree as well as English."

The Lac La Biche Mission is now a national historic site and provincial historic resource. It was the site of one of the first residential schools in Alberta.

=== Treaties and insurrection ===
The Government of Canada sought to extinguish the First Nations' title to the land across the prairies, in order to open the land up to settlement. Treaty 6 was negotiated in 1876 and covered the lands to the south of Lac La Biche.

The new Hudson's Bay Company post at Lac La Biche was looted on April 26, 1885, during the North-West Rebellion by members of Big Bear's band. Their plan to loot the nearby Roman Catholic mission was stopped by the local Cree and Métis population. Métis scrip records show many residents of the area were awarded scrip by the Government of Canada from 1885 until the 1920s.

Treaty 8, covering the lands north of Lac La Biche, was negotiated in 1899. This set the stage for railway construction and settlement.

== Climate ==
The record high temperature was 35.6 °C (96.1 °F) recorded June 30, 2021. The record high daily minimum was 21.2 °C (70.2 °F) recorded July 1, 2021. The record highest dew point was 21.4 °C (70.5 °F) recorded July 21, 2024. The most humid month was August 2022 with an average dew point of 12.7 °C (54.9 °F). The warmest month was July 2024 with an average mean temperature of 20.0 °C (68.0 °F), the highest average monthly daily minimum of 14.0 °C (57.2 °F), and no temperature below 8.6 °C (47.5 °F) for the entire month. July 2007 recorded the highest monthly average daily maximum of 26.5 °C (79.7 °F). July 2012 set a record of no maximum temperature below 19.4 °C (66.9 °F) for the entire month. July 2022 recorded no dew point below 5.6 °C (42.1 °F) throughout the month.

The lowest yearly maximum dew point is 15.8 °C (60.4 °F) recorded in 2025. The lowest yearly maximum daily minimum temperature is 13.8 °C (56.8 °F) recorded in 2005. The lowest yearly maximum temperature is 27.8 °C (82.0 °F) recorded in 2005.

The average yearly maximum dew point is 18.6 °C (65.5 °F) and the average yearly maximum daily minimum temperature is 16.5 °C (61.7 °F).

Climate data for Lac La Biche (normals 1996-2020, dewpoint normals 2003-2020, extremes 1958-present)
Month	Jan	Feb	Mar	Apr	May	Jun	Jul	Aug	Sep	Oct	Nov	Dec	Year
Record high humidex	12.5	14.1	16.7	26.9	31.6	40.7	39.0	38.9	33.0	28.3	19.5	12.1	40.7
Record high °C (°F)	12.5 (54.5)	14.2 (57.6)	17.6 (63.7)	27.3 (81.1)	31.7 (89.1)	35.6 (96.1)	34.7 (94.5)	32.7 (90.9)	30.9 (87.6)	27.2 (81.0)	19.6 (67.3)	12.4 (54.3)	35.6 (96.1)
Mean maximum °C (°F)	6.7 (44.1)	6.8 (44.2)	10.8 (51.4)	20.7 (69.3)	27.4 (81.3)	28.3 (82.9)	30.5 (86.9)	28.8 (83.8)	25.7 (78.3)	19.1 (66.4)	10.6 (51.1)	5.1 (41.2)	31.2 (88.2)
Mean daily maximum °C (°F)	−8.8 (16.2)	−5.2 (22.6)	0.1 (32.2)	9.2 (48.6)	16.8 (62.2)	20.6 (69.1)	23.1 (73.6)	21.9 (71.4)	16.4 (61.5)	8.2 (46.8)	−1.3 (29.7)	−7.4 (18.7)	7.8 (46.0)
Daily mean °C (°F)	−13.9 (7.0)	−11.0 (12.2)	−5.6 (21.9)	3.1 (37.6)	10.1 (50.2)	14.5 (58.1)	17.2 (63.0)	15.7 (60.3)	10.5 (50.9)	3.4 (38.1)	−5.5 (22.1)	−12.3 (9.9)	2.2 (36.0)
Mean daily minimum °C (°F)	−19.1 (−2.4)	−16.8 (1.8)	−11.2 (11.8)	−3.1 (26.4)	3.4 (38.1)	8.2 (46.8)	11.2 (52.2)	9.5 (49.1)	4.6 (40.3)	−1.5 (29.3)	−9.7 (14.5)	−17.1 (1.2)	−3.5 (25.7)
Mean minimum °C (°F)	−37.3 (−35.1)	−31.7 (−25.1)	−28.0 (−18.4)	−12.8 (9.0)	−4.4 (24.1)	1.4 (34.5)	5.7 (42.3)	2.9 (37.2)	−2.7 (27.1)	−8.9 (16.0)	−21.8 (−7.2)	−30.7 (−23.3)	−38.9 (−38.0)
Record low °C (°F)	−48.3 (−54.9)	−46.7 (−52.1)	−44.4 (−47.9)	−26.1 (−15.0)	−12.6 (9.3)	−3.3 (26.1)	1.8 (35.2)	−2.2 (28.0)	−8.4 (16.9)	−16.4 (2.5)	−40.0 (−40.0)	−43.3 (−45.9)	−48.3 (−54.9)
Record low wind chill	−53.3	−52.1	−48.0	−44.0	−19.6	−4.7	0.0	0.0	−11.1	−24.1	−49.0	−51.6	−53.3
Average precipitation mm (inches)	19.0 (0.75)	13.0 (0.51)	15.3 (0.60)	28.9 (1.14)	32.4 (1.28)	63.9 (2.52)	91.9 (3.62)	47.1 (1.85)	31.8 (1.25)	—	16.7 (0.66)	16.5 (0.65)	—
Average precipitation days (≥ 0.2mm)	13.1	11.6	9.8	10.4	9.2	13.7	15.0	11.3	10.5	—	10.1	12.1	—
Average relative humidity (%) (at 1500LT)	67.4	59.2	49.7	42.2	38.2	47.9	51.2	50.8	50.2	55.9	67.6	70.9	54.3
Average dew point °C (°F)	−15.8 (3.6)	−15.6 (3.9)	−10.3 (13.5)	−5.2 (22.6)	0.4 (32.7)	7.5 (45.5)	10.9 (51.6)	9.5 (49.1)	4.8 (40.6)	−1.9 (28.6)	−8.9 (16.0)	−15.0 (5.0)	−3.3 (26.1)
Source 1: Environment Canada
Source 2: weatherstats.ca (for dewpoint and monthly&yearly average absolute maximum&minimum temperature)

== Demographics ==
In the 2021 Census of Population conducted by Statistics Canada, Lac La Biche had a population of 3,215 living in 1,236 of its 1,505 total private dwellings, a change of −3.2% from its 2016 population of 3,320. With a land area of 68.39 km^{2} (26.41 sq mi), it had a population density of 47.0/km^{2} (121.8/sq mi) in 2021.

As a designated place in the 2016 Census of Population conducted by Statistics Canada, Lac La Biche had a population of 2,314 living in 895 of its 1,048 total private dwellings, a change of −8.2% from its 2011 population of 2,520. With a land area of 6.05 km^{2} (2.34 sq mi), it had a population density of 382.5/km^{2} (990.6/sq mi) in 2016.

Lac La Biche County's 2016 municipal census counted a population of 2,682 in Lac La Biche, a −7.4% change from its 2013 municipal census population of 2,895.

Panethnic groups in the dissolved municipality (former town) of Lac La Biche (1971−2021)
Panethnic group	2021		2016		2006		2001		1996		1991		1986		1981		1971	
Panethnic group	Pop.	%	Pop.	%	Pop.	%	Pop.	%	Pop.	%	Pop.	%	Pop.	%	Pop.	%	Pop.	%
European (Note: Statistic includes all persons that did not make up part of a visible minority or an indigenous identity.)	1,445	49.4%	1,055	49.88%	1,545	57.87%	1,450	53.9%	1,540	60.99%	1,370	55.24%	1,480	58.04%	1,270	60.05%	1,200	69.97%
Indigenous	775	26.5%	695	32.86%	925	34.64%	925	34.39%	590	23.37%	815	32.86%	725	28.43%	610	28.84%	345	20.12%
Southeast Asian (Note: Statistic includes total responses of "Filipino" and "Southeast Asian" under visible minority section on census.)	300	10.26%	135	6.38%	0	0%	0	0%	10	0.4%	20	0.81%	0	0%	—N/a	—N/a	—N/a	—N/a
Middle Eastern (Note: Statistic includes total responses of "West Asian" and "Arab" under visible minority section on census.)	225	7.69%	135	6.38%	180	6.74%	290	10.78%	265	10.5%	220	8.67%	305	11.96%	225	10.64%	160	9.33%
South Asian	85	2.91%	50	2.36%	10	0.37%	0	0%	0	0%	0	0%	0	0%	0	0%	0	0%
East Asian (Note: Statistic includes total responses of "Chinese", "Korean", and "Japanese" under visible minority section on census.)	20	0.68%	25	1.18%	10	0.37%	0	0%	10	0.4%	10	0.4%	10	0.39%	0	0%	0	0%
African	20	0.68%	35	1.65%	0	0%	0	0%	85	3.37%	35	1.41%	30	1.18%	10	0.47%	0	0%
Latin American	20	0.68%	0	0%	0	0%	15	0.56%	0	0%	10	0.4%	0	0%	0	0%	0	0%
Other/multiracial (Note: Statistic includes total responses of "Visible minority, n.i.e." and "Multiple visible minorities" under visible minority section on census.)	15	0.51%	0	0%	10	0.37%	10	0.37%	25	0.99%	—N/a	—N/a	—N/a	—N/a	—N/a	—N/a	5	0.29%
Total responses	2,925	93.75%	2,115	63.7%	2,670	96.81%	2,690	96.9%	2,525	96.71%	2,480	97.29%	2,550	99.88%	2,115	105.38%	1,715	95.76%
Total population	3,120	100%	3,320	100%	2,758	100%	2,776	100%	2,611	100%	2,549	100%	2,553	100%	2,007	100%	1,791	100%
Note: Totals greater than 100% due to multiple origin responses

== Economy ==
The community is supported by the oil patch, logging, forestry, agriculture, and commercial fishing.

Jamie Davis Towing (featured on the Highway Thru Hell reality show) has an operation in Lac La Biche.

== Attractions ==
Outdoor activities in Lac La Biche include fishing, hunting, boating, and camping. The area features several campgrounds and parks, including Sir Winston Churchill Provincial Park, on an island in Lac La Biche. The community also has the Lac La Biche Golf & Country Club, an 18-hole course on the lakefront, and the Bold Centre, a modern recreation and events complex that hosts sports, concerts, and community gatherings.

=== Museums and heritage ===
The community’s main institution, the Lac La Biche Museum, opened in 2014 and is in the Jubilee Hall building near the recreation grounds. The museum presents exhibits on the region’s natural history, fur trade, and cultural development, highlighting Indigenous, Métis, and settler histories. In addition to its permanent displays, the museum offers educational programming, hosts temporary art and history exhibitions, and collaborates with local schools and community organizations to promote heritage awareness. At the Portage College campus, the Museum of Aboriginal Peoples’ Art and Artifacts houses one of Alberta’s most significant public collections of Indigenous art. Its holdings include paintings, sculptures, and traditional works by First Nations, Métis, and Inuit artists from across Canada. The museum also preserves the permanent collection of the Professional Native Indian Artists Inc., known as the “Indigenous Group of Seven” which represents a milestone in the recognition of contemporary Indigenous art in Canada. Nearby, the Lac La Biche Mission, a designated national historic site of Canada, preserves original 19th-century mission buildings and interprets the intertwined histories of missionaries, Indigenous peoples, and early settlers in the region.

=== Festivals and events ===
Lac La Biche hosts several annual events that celebrate community, culture and the outdoors. Since 1963, the signature summer event, Lac La Biche Pow-Wow and Fish Derby, combines traditional powwow with a community fish derby and associated activities. In winter the Lac La Biche Ice Festival (formerly the Winter Festival of Speed) features ice racing, snowmobile events, ice and snow sculpting, family activities and concerts.

== Government ==
MLAs representing Lac La Biche
Assembly	Years	Member	Party
Part of Victoria (N.W.T.)
3rd	1894–1898	Frank Tims	Independent
4th	1898–1902	Jack Shera	Independent
5th	1902–1905	Jack Shera	Independent
Part of Victoria
1st	1905–1909	Francis Walker	Liberal
Part of Pakan
2nd	1909–1913	Prosper-Edmond Lessard	Liberal
Part of Beaver River
3rd	1913–1917	Wilfrid Gariépy	Liberal
4th	1917–1921	Wilfrid Gariépy	Liberal
5th	1921–1926	Joseph Dechêne	Liberal
6th	1926–1930	John Delisle	United Farmers
7th	1930–1935	Henry Dakin	Liberal
8th	1935–1940	Lucien Maynard	Social Credit
9th	1940–1944	Lucien Maynard	Social Credit
10th	1944–1948	Lucien Maynard	Social Credit
11th	1948–1952	Harry Lobay	Social Credit
Part of Lac La Biche
12th	1952–1955	Harry Lobay	Social Credit
13th	1955–1959	Michael Maccagno	Liberal
14th	1959–1963	Michael Maccagno	Liberal
15th	1963–1967	Michael Maccagno	Liberal
16th	1967–1968	Michael Maccagno	Liberal
16th	1968	Vacant	
16th	1968–1971	Damase Bouvier	Social Credit
Part of Lac La Biche-McMurray
17th	1971–1972	Damase Bouvier	Social Credit
17th	1972–1975	Damase Bouvier	Independent
18th	1975–1979	Ron Tesolin	Progressive; Conservative
19th	1979–1982	Norm Weiss	Progressive; Conservative
20th	1982–1986	Norm Weiss	Progressive; Conservative
Part of Athabasca-Lac La Biche
21st	1986–1989	Léo Piquette	New Democrat
22nd	1989–1993	Mike Cardinal	Progressive; Conservative
Part of Lac La Biche-St. Paul
23rd	1993–1994	Paul Langevin	Liberal
23rd	1994–1995	Paul Langevin	Independent
23rd	1995–1997	Paul Langevin	Progressive; Conservative
24th	1997–2001	Paul Langevin	Progressive; Conservative
25th	2001–2004	Ray Danyluk	Progressive; Conservative
26th	2004–2008	Ray Danyluk	Progressive; Conservative
27th	2008–2012	Ray Danyluk	Progressive; Conservative
Part of Lac La Biche-St. Paul-Two Hills
28th	2012–2015	Shayne Saskiw	Wildrose
29th	2015–2017	Dave Hanson	Wildrose
29th	2017–2019	Dave Hanson	United Conservative
Part of Fort McMurray-Lac La Biche
30th	2019–2021	Laila Goodridge	United Conservative
30th	2022–2023	Brian Jean	United Conservative
31st	2023–	Brian Jean	United Conservative

The Hamlet of Lac La Biche comprises Lac La Biche County's Ward 7. Paul Reutov was elected as mayor in 2025. Councillors John Mondal and Omer Moghrabi represent Ward 7 on Lac La Biche County Council. Provincially, the community has been represented by every major political party in Alberta history (expand table for details).

== Infrastructure ==
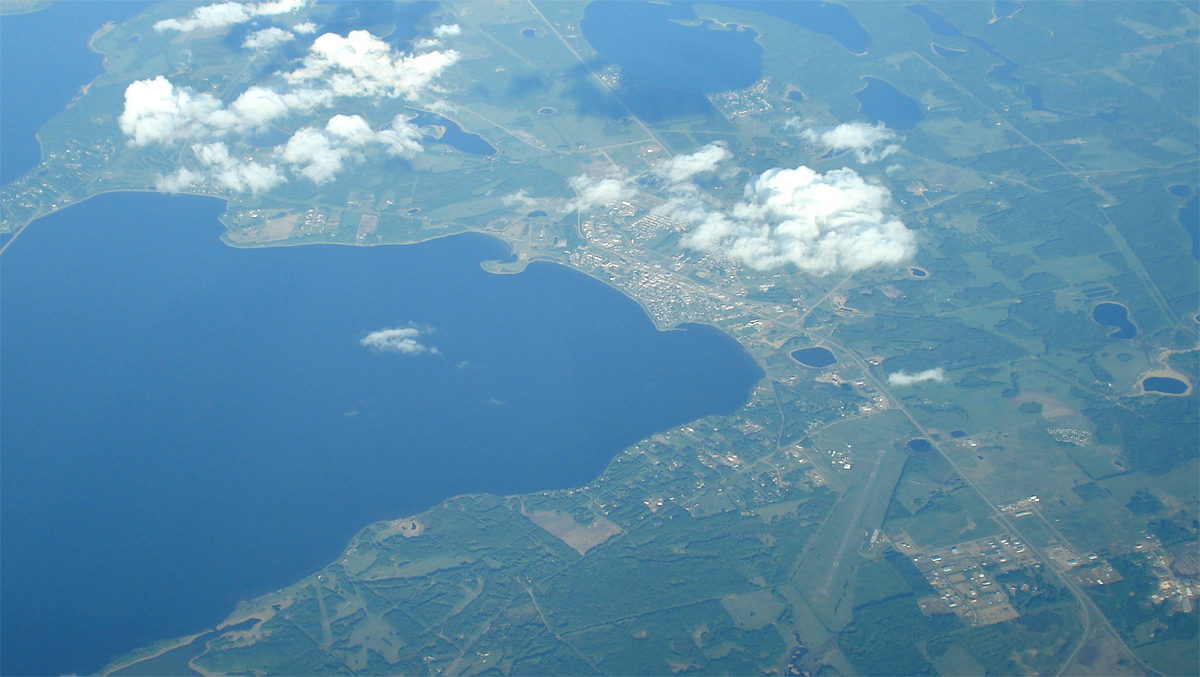
Aerial view of Lac La Biche (2010)

Lac La Biche Airport (YLB) is located 1.5 nautical miles (2.8 km; 1.7 mi) west of Lac La Biche. It features a fully serviced 5,700 by 100 ft (1,737 by 30 m) paved airstrip.

== Education ==
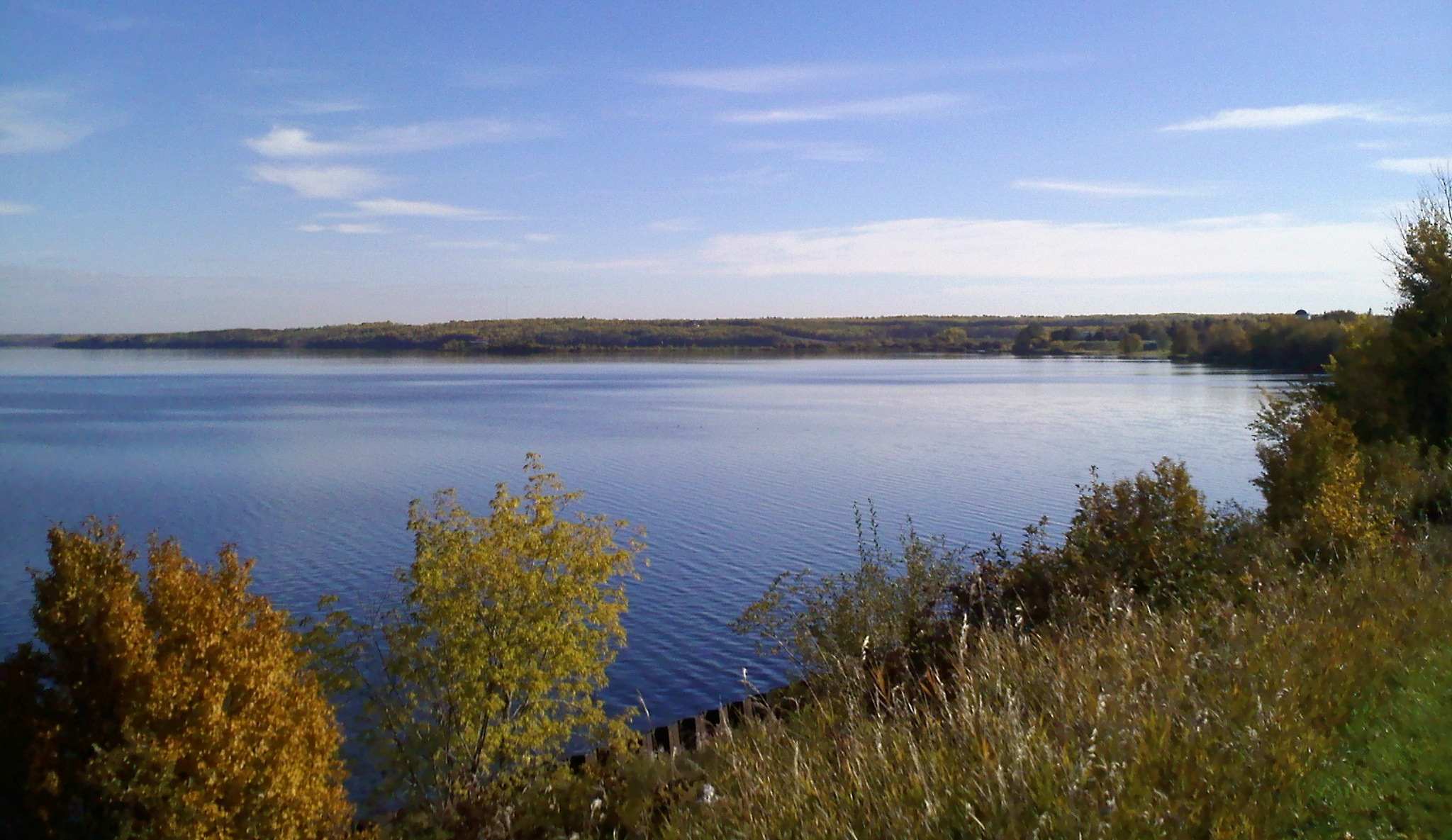
Lac la Biche from the west end of the community

The main campus of Portage College is in Lac La Biche. The college has an ACAC hockey team named the Portage Voyageurs. The team's first season began in the fall of 2008.

Northern Lights School Division No. 69

- Vera M. Welsh Elementary School (K-3)
- Aurora Middle School (4–8)
- J.A. Williams High School (9–12)
- Lac La Biche Off-Campus (8–12)

Other

- Light of Christ Catholic School (Preschool-Grade 11)
- École Sainte-Catherine (K-4)

== Media ==
=== Newspapers ===
Lac La Biche has been served by several local newspapers. The Lac La Biche Herald operated during 1940-1960s. Since 1968, the weekly Lac La Biche Post has been published and remains an active local newspaper.

=== Radio ===
The area is also served by the English-language radio station Boom 103.5, and the French-language community radio station Boréal FM (92.1 FM), which serves the francophone community of the Plamondon–Lac La Biche area.

== See also ==
- List of communities in Alberta
- List of former urban municipalities in Alberta
- List of hamlets in Alberta

== Sources ==
- Barkwell, Lawrence J. (2013). Metis scrip claims from Lac la Biche, Alberta under the Dominion Lands Act (Report).
- Dickason, Olive P. (1999). "Metis". In Paul Robert Magocsi (ed.). The Encyclopedia of Canada's Peoples. Toronto, Ontario: University of Toronto Press. ISBN 0-8020-2938-8.
- Thompson, David (1916). J. B. Tyrrell (ed.). David Thompson's Narrative of his Explorations in Western America 1784–1812. Toronto: Champlain Society. This is the full-text diary of David Thompson which includes numerous references to the Nahathaway in general and to the First Nations of the Lac la Biche region in particular. He describes their belief in life after death and consequences on the human soul for crimes and misdeeds.
