= Buffalo Lake Metis Settlement =

Buffalo Lake
- Metis Settlement
- Buffalo Lake Metis Settlement
- Boundaries of Buffalo Lake Settlement

- Country: Canada
- Province: Alberta
- Region: Northern Alberta
- Planning region: North Saskatchewan
- Municipal district: Métis Settlement

Government
  - Chair: Harold Blyan
  - Governing body: Buffalo Lake Metis Settlement Council

Area (2021)
  - Land: 440.92 km^{2} (170.24 sq mi)

Population (2021)
  - Total: 978
  - Density: 2.2/km^{2} (5.7/sq mi)
- Time zone: UTC−06:00 (Alberta Time)
- Postal code: T0A 4B0
- Website: buffalolakems.ca

Buffalo Lake Metis Settlement is a Metis settlement in northern Alberta, Canada. It is located along Highway 855, approximately 125 km (78 mi) northeast of Edmonton. Buffalo Lake Metis Settlement is one of 8 Metis Settlements in Alberta established as local government corporations in 1990 by enactment of the Metis Settlements Act, RSA 2000,M-14

== Demographics ==
As a designated place in the 2021 Census of Population conducted by Statistics Canada, Buffalo Lake had a population of 379 living in 128 of its 131 total private dwellings, a change of −46.8% from its 2016 population of 712. With a land area of 335.68 km^{2} (129.61 sq mi), it had a population density of 1.1/km^{2} (2.9/sq mi) in 2021.

The population of the Buffalo Lake Metis Settlement according to its 2018 municipal census is 702, an increase from its 2015 municipal census population count of 676.

As a designated place in the 2016 Census of Population conducted by Statistics Canada, the Buffalo Lake Metis Settlement had a population of 712 living in 225 of its 240 total private dwellings, a change of 44.7% from its 2011 population of 492. With a land area of 336.97 km^{2} (130.10 sq mi), it had a population density of 2.1/km^{2} (5.5/sq mi) in 2016.

== See also ==
- List of communities in Alberta
- List of designated places in Alberta
