= Lac La Biche Mission =

Coordinates: 54°49′24″N 112°05′30″W

- Notre Dame des Victoires (French)
- Interactive map of Lac La Biche Mission
- Location: Lac la Biche, Alberta, Canada

The Lac La Biche Mission (officially Notre Dame des Victoires / Lac La Biche Mission) is an historic site located on Lac la Biche in Alberta, Canada.

The mission was established in 1853 by Oblate missionaries in what is now the town of Lac La Biche, Alberta, it was moved to its current lakeside location in 1855.

The mission introduced agriculture, boat building, saw milling, and other pre-industrial skills to First Nations people living in the area. The site currently has several historical buildings and displays. Guided tours are available. The Lac La Biche Mission is a Provincial Historic Site (Alberta) and a National Historic Site.

== Convent ==
Built in 1894, the convent is the oldest building on Lac La Biche Mission site. It was constructed from sawn timber cut at the Mission sawmill.

The convent was used as a school, chapel, and hospice as well as the residence for nuns, orphans, and other students. The convent currently houses several displays including the Métis Room. It is part of the Priests Dining Room, which has a part of the original wall with paint made from algae and calcimine. The Archaeology Display is currently in a room that was once a part of the kitchen. This room showcases items found after the 2009 Rectory Fire, as well as items pulled from the lake during the archaeological digs. It has on display a large collection of photos featuring former students who attended school.

== Education ==
Between 1856 and 1864, students attended the Lac La Biche Missionschool sporadically. In 1862, the Sisters of Charity (Grey Nuns) arrived and began teaching First Nations children in the convent. However, once the Les Filles de Jésus (Daughters of Jesus) arrived at the Mission in 1905, they established a school for local children as well as for boarding students. The Oblates wanted all children to learn together so there was no separation of race.

The Mission school taught mathematics, reading, religious studies, French, English, drawing, husbandry, and household skills. The sisters taught in the convent until 1961. After that, a schoolhouse was brought to the site. The schoolhouse remained in operation until 1963.
