= Sir Winston Churchill Provincial Park =

Provincial park in Alberta, Canada

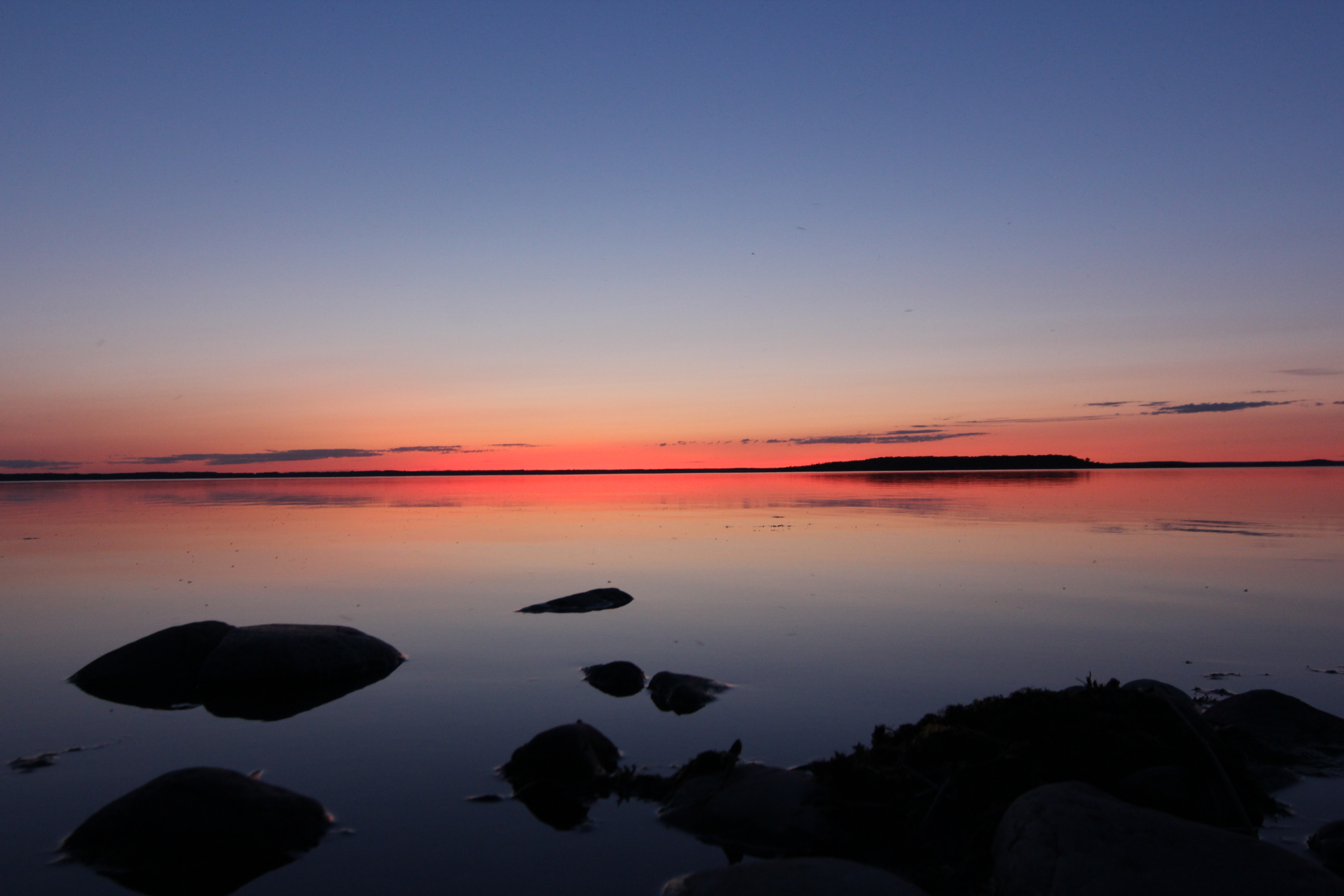

- Location within Alberta
- Interactive map of Sir Winston Churchill Provincial Park
- Location: Alberta, Canada
- Coordinates: 54°49′55″N 111°58′22″W
- Established: 1952
- Governing body: Alberta Environment and Parks
- Website: http://www.albertaparks.ca/sir-winston-churchill.aspx

Sir Winston Churchill Provincial Park is a provincial park located in east-central Alberta, Canada, on the shore of Lac la Biche. The park is renowned for its birdwatching and its old-growth forests. The park consists of multiple islands in the east basin of Lac la Biche. Big Island and Long Island are connected to the shore by a causeway, with Big Island being the largest island and making up most of the park. The other islands are only accessible by boat and remain undeveloped.

== History ==
Sir Winston Churchill Provincial Park is located on the traditional lands of the Cree and Chipewyan indigenous peoples. The islands were historically used by settlers from the Lac la Biche Mission, with both Birch and Currant Island being used for farming cucumbers and sheep. The nuns of the mission and the children they cared for lived on Black Fox Island from April 28 to May 12, 1885, in order to stay safe during the North-West Rebellion. Furthermore, Black Fox Island was also used as a pasture for the missions' cattle. During the 1920s, the vast majority of the whitefish caught for the local fisheries were taken from the sand bar between Long Island and Big Island, (Note: this area is now covered by the causeway) where the lake was shallow and the spawning fish were caught using spears, resulting in a haul of around a thousand per night. In June 1920, the government of Canada selected the islands of Lac la Biche as well as some surrounding wilderness as a potential site for a bird sanctuary as an attempt to further protect waterfowl in Canada under the Migratory Birds Convention Act. This proposal was declined by the Lac la Biche Board of Trade due to the importance of duck hunting to Lac la Biche, and because they believed it may discourage further settlement in the area. The park was established on September 29, 1952, initially being named Big Island Provincial Park, it was renamed in honour of British former Prime Minister Winston Churchill in 1962 by Alberta's Legislative Assembly. (Note: Some websites claim that it was renamed after Churchill's death but this seems to be a misunderstanding since Churchill died in 1965) In 2009, Sir Winston Churchill Provincial Park was expanded to include Birch Island, Currant Island, Red Fox Island, High Island, Pelican Island, Black Fox Island, and two unnamed islands after a proposal by Alberta Parks citing their ecological importance.

== Recreation and facilities ==
Activities at the park in the summer include boating, fishing, swimming, camping, sailing, and canoeing while activities in the winter include snowshoeing, ice fishing, and cross-country skiing. Year-round activities include hiking and birdwatching. There are multiple areas open for day-use, as well as a campground and a group camping area on Big Island. Long Island also hosts small cabins that can be rented. Sir Winston Churchill Provincial Parks beaches are very popular during the summer and spring for sunbathing and swimming.

== Flora ==
The park hosts a large array of plant life, such as its 300-year-old old growth mixed-wood forests, the most impressive of which are accessible via the Old Growth Alley trail. Forests in the park are mostly made up of balsam fir, jack pine, trembling aspen, white spruce, and black spruce. Common plants in the park include woodland strawberry, red raspberry, choke cherry, lingonberry, northern starflower, bunchberry, bluntleaf sandwort, northern cranesbill, moschatel, and skunk currant.

== Fauna ==
Sir Winston Churchill Provincial Park is well known for its diversity in bird-life, with over 200 species recorded in the park. During the summer and spring, many migrating warblers frequent the park, including black-throated green warbler, bay-breasted warbler, chestnut-sided warbler, mourning warbler, Canada warbler and Blackburnian warbler. The park also hosts a large colony of American white pelican located on the Pelican Islands, a pair of small sandy islets in the lake that are visible from a viewing platform on Big Island. The smaller islands in the park host important bird colonies for double-crested cormorant, great blue heron, and Caspian tern (the only one in Central Alberta). Other common birds in the park include great grey owl, white-throated sparrow, ruffed grouse, eastern phoebe, sanderling, blue-headed vireo, and alder flycatcher. Mammals in the park include red fox, Canadian beaver, American black bear, muskrat, Franklin's ground squirrel, snowshoe hare, western deer mouse, least chipmunk, American red squirrel, and formerly gray wolf. Hoary and big brown bats also live in the park. The bogs and ponds on Big Island host boreal chorus frog, while wood frogs are common throughout the park. Common insects in the park include flower chafer, LeConte's haploa moth, boreal whiteface, Polyphemus moth, white-margined burrower bug, and northeastern pine sawyer.
