= Athabasca County =

Municipal district in Alberta, Canada

- Municipal district
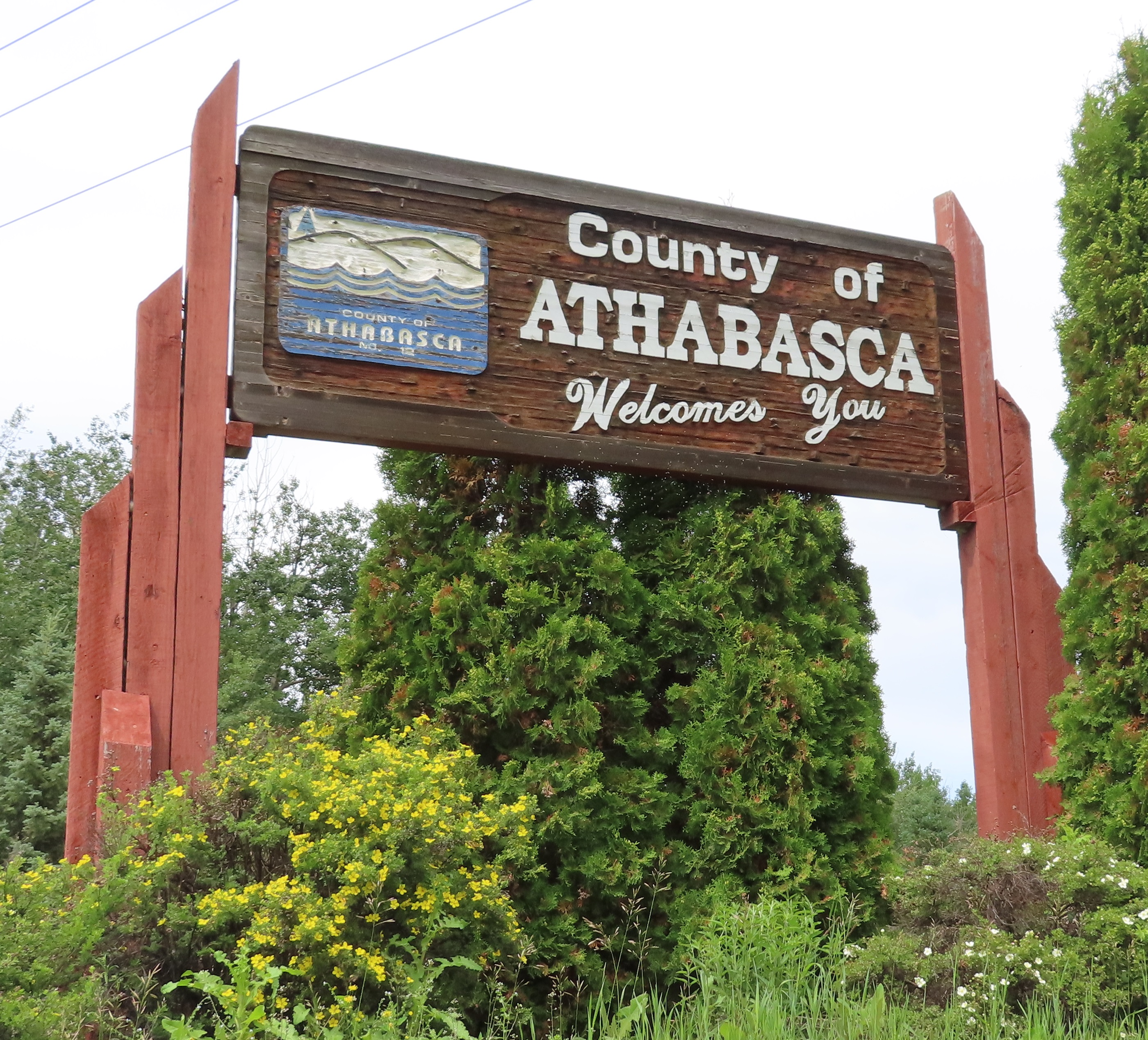
- Welcome sign

- Logo

- Major communities

- Location within Alberta
- Country: Canada
- Province: Alberta
- Region: Northern Alberta
- Planning region: Upper Athabasca
- Established: 1947
- Incorporated: 1959 (County)

Government
  - Reeve: Brian Hall
  - Governing body: Joe Gerlach Natasha Kapitaniuk Ashtin Anderson Tracy Holland Gary Cromwell Kelly Chamzuk Rob Minns Camille Wallach
  - CAO: Bob Beck
  - Administrative office: Athabasca

Area (2021)
  - Land: 6,111.3 km^{2} (2,359.6 sq mi)

Population (2021)
  - Total: 6,959
  - Density: 1.1/km^{2} (2.8/sq mi)
- Time zone: UTC−06:00 (Alberta Time)
- Website: Official website

Athabasca County is a municipal district in north central Alberta, Canada. It is located northeast of Edmonton and is in Census Division No. 13. Prior to an official renaming on December 1, 2009, Athabasca County was officially known as the County of Athabasca No. 12.

== Geography ==
=== Communities and localities ===
The following urban municipalities are surrounded by Athabasca County.

Cities

- none

Towns

- Athabasca

Villages

- Boyle

Summer villages

- Bondiss
- Island Lake
- Island Lake South
- Mewatha Beach
- South Baptiste
- Sunset Beach
- West Baptiste
- Whispering Hills

The following hamlets are located within Athabasca County.

Hamlets

- Atmore
- Breynat
- Caslan
- Colinton
- Donatville
- Ellscott
- Grassland
- Meanook
- Perryvale
- Rochester
- Wandering River

The following localities are located within Athabasca County.

Localities

- Amber Valley
- Amesbury
- Athabasca Acres
- Athabasca Landing Settlement
- Balay Subdivision
- Baptiste Lake
- Big Coulee
- Blue Jay
- Century Estates
- Coolidge
- Dakin
- Deep Creek
- Frains
- Glenshaw
- Grosmont
- Kinikinik
- Lahaieville
- Lincoln
- Lyall Subdivision
- McNabb's
- Meadowbrook
- Meanock
- O'Morrow
- Paxson
- Pine Grove Estates
- Pleasant View
- Prosperity
- Richmond Park
- Sarrail
- Sawdy
- Spruce Valley
- West Wind Trailer Park
- White Gull

Lakes

- North Buck Lake

== Demographics ==
In the 2021 Census of Population conducted by Statistics Canada, Athabasca County had a population of 6,959 living in 2,832 of its 3,746 total private dwellings, a change of −11.6% from its 2016 population of 7,869. With a land area of 6,111.3 km^{2} (2,359.6 sq mi), it had a population density of 1.1/km^{2} (2.9/sq mi) in 2021.

In the 2016 Census of Population conducted by Statistics Canada, Athabasca County had a population of 7,869 living in 3,067 of its 4,093 total private dwellings, a 2.7% change from its 2011 population of 7,662. With a land area of 6,124.43 km^{2} (2,364.66 sq mi), it had a population density of 1.3/km^{2} (3.3/sq mi) in 2016.

Visible minority and Aboriginal population (Canada 2006 Census)
Population group		Population	% of total population
White		6,650	87.7%
Visible minority group Source:	South Asian	0	0%
Visible minority group Source:	Chinese	15	0.2%
Visible minority group Source:	Black	35	0.5%
Visible minority group Source:	Filipino	20	0.3%
Visible minority group Source:	Latin American	0	0%
Visible minority group Source:	Arab	15	0.2%
Visible minority group Source:	Southeast Asian	25	0.3%
Visible minority group Source:	West Asian	0	0%
Visible minority group Source:	Korean	0	0%
Visible minority group Source:	Japanese	15	0.2%
Visible minority group Source:	Visible minority, n.i.e.	0	0%
Visible minority group Source:	Multiple visible minority	0	0%
Total visible minority population		125	1.6%
Aboriginal group Source:	First Nations	310	4.1%
Aboriginal group Source:	Métis	500	6.6%
Aboriginal group Source:	Inuit	0	0%
Aboriginal group Source:	Aboriginal, n.i.e.	0	0%
Aboriginal group Source:	Multiple Aboriginal identity	0	0%
Total Aboriginal population		810	10.7%
Total population		7,585	100%

== See also ==
- List of communities in Alberta
- List of francophone communities in Alberta
- List of municipal districts in Alberta
