= Abee (disambiguation) =

Abee is a hamlet in Alberta, Canada.

Abee may also refer to:

- Abee (meteorite), that fell on 1952 in Abee, Alberta, Canada
- Abée Castle, in Tinlot, Liège, Belgium

== People with the surname ==
- Steve Abee, American writer and poet

== See also ==
- McAbee, a surname
