= List of minerals recognized by the International Mineralogical Association (O) =

This list includes those recognised minerals beginning with the letter O. The International Mineralogical Association is the international group that recognises new minerals and new mineral names; however, minerals discovered before 1959 did not go through the official naming procedure, although some minerals published previously have been either confirmed or discredited since that date. This list contains a mixture of mineral names that have been approved since 1959 and those mineral names believed to still refer to valid mineral species (these are called "grandfathered" species).

The list is divided into groups:

- Introduction • (Main synonyms)
- A • B • C • D • E • F • G • H • I • J • K • L • M • N • O • P–Q • R • S • T • U–V • W–X • Y–Z

The data was exported from mindat.org on 29 April 2005; updated up to 'IMA2021'.

The minerals are sorted by name, followed by the structural group (rruff.info/ima and ima-cnmnc by mineralienatlas.de, mainly) or chemical class (mindat.org and basics), the year of publication (if it's before of an IMA approval procedure), the IMA approval and the Strunz-mindat code. The first link is to mindat.org, the second link is to webmineral.com, and the third is to the Handbook of Mineralogy (Mineralogical Society of America).

- Abbreviations:
  - ^{D} – discredited (IMA/CNMNC status).
  - ^{Q} – questionable/ doubtful (IMA/CNMNC, mindat.org or mineralienatlas.de status).
  - ^{N} – published without approval of the IMA/CNMNC, or just not an IMA approved mineral but with some acceptance in the scientific community nowadays.
  - ^{I} – intermediate member of a solid-solution series.
  - ^{H} – hypothetical mineral (synthetic, anthropogenic, suspended approval procedure, etc.)
    - ^{ch} – incomplete description, hypothetical solid solution end member.
  - Rd – redefinition of ...
  - "s.p." – special procedure.
  - group – a name used to designate a group of species, sometimes only a mineral group name.
  - no – no link available.
  - IUPAC – chemical name.
  - Y: NNNN – year of publication.
  - Y: old – known before publications were available.

== O ==
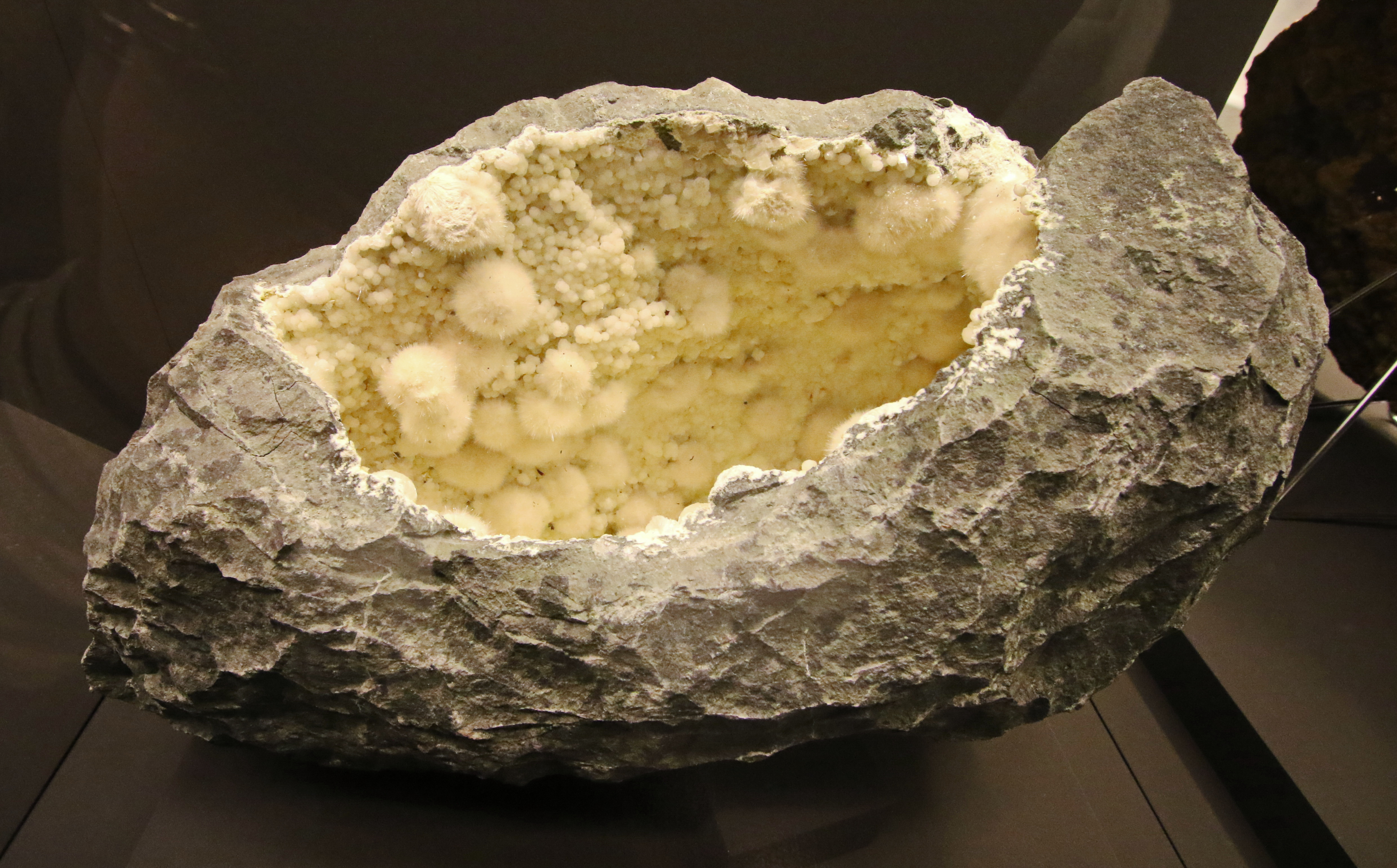
Okenite

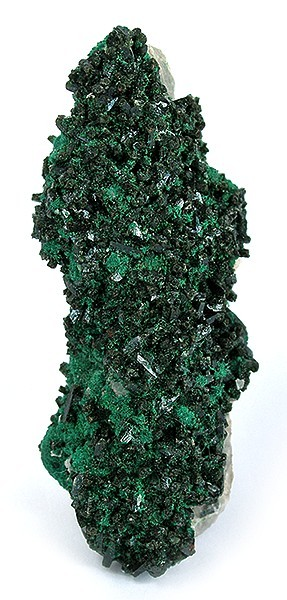
Olivenite (dark olive-green) and malachite (light green), Tsumeb mine, Namibia size: 4.8 x 2.0 x 1.0 cm

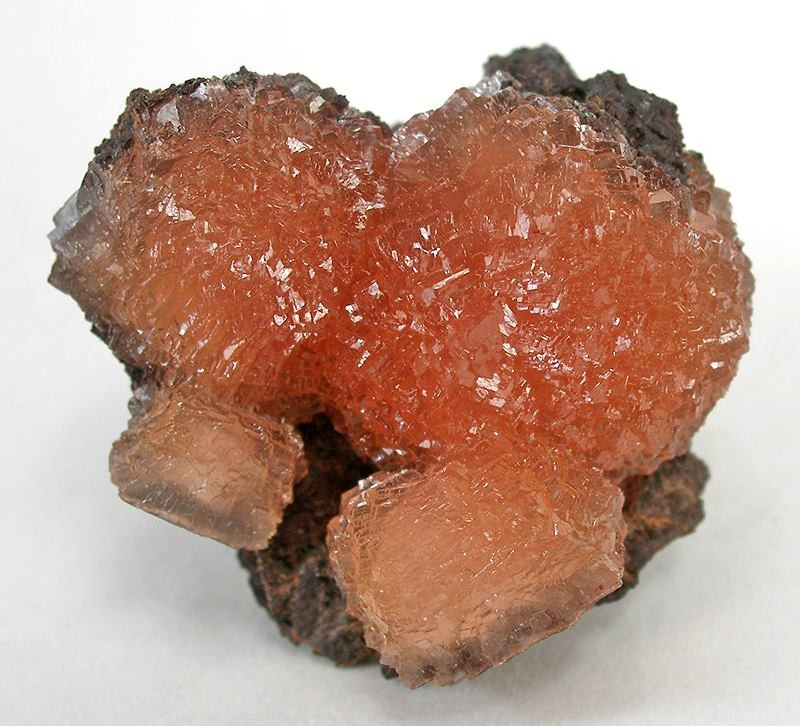
Olmiite from N'Chwaning II Mine, N'Chwaning Mines, Kuruman, Kalahari manganese fields, Northern Cape Province, South Africa

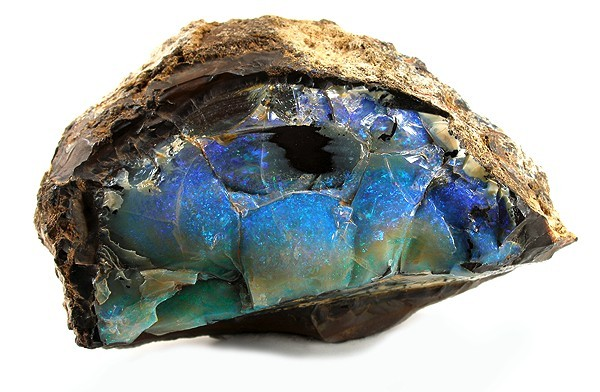
Opal, central Queensland, Australia size 11.0 x 7.2 x 4.8 cm

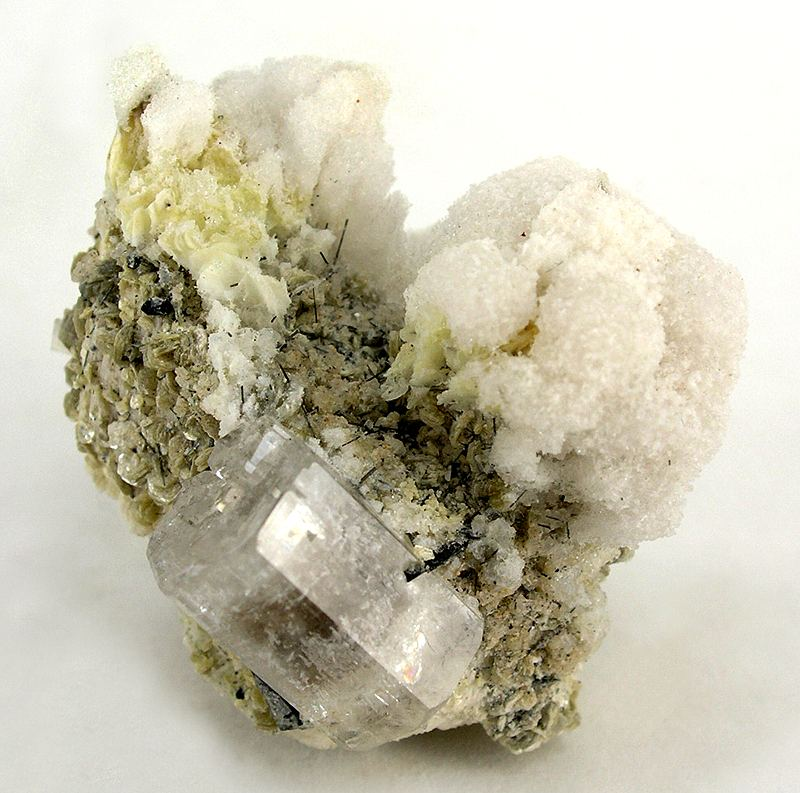
Hyalite opal on goshenite

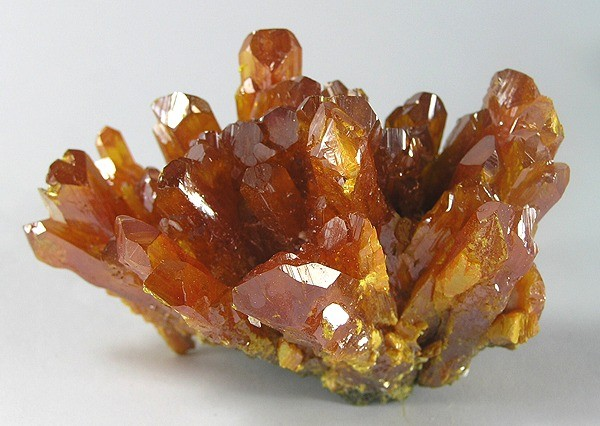
Orpiment, Jiepaiyu Mine, Shimen County, China size: 6.4 x 3.9 x 3.4 cm

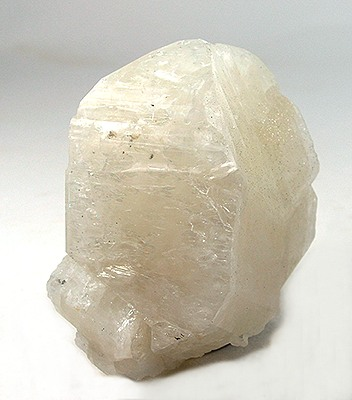
Orthoclase. Zinnenthal, Switzerland

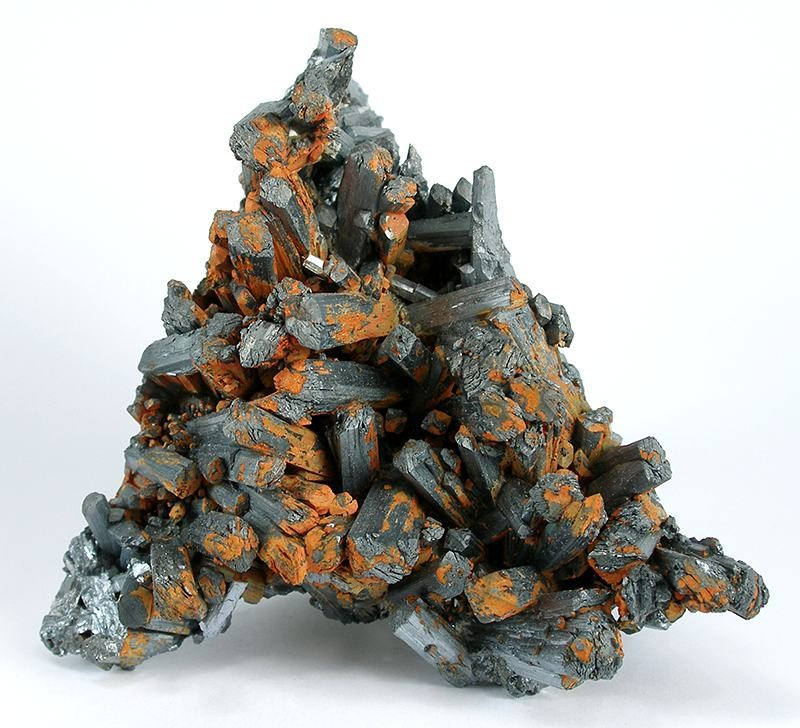
Ottensite with stibnite, and matrix

1. Oberthürite (IMA2017-072) 2.0 [no] [no]
2. Oberwolfachite (alunite: IMA2021-010) [no] [no]
3. Oboyerite (tellurite-tellurium oxysalt: IMA1979-009) 4.JN.25
  (IUPAC: hexahydrogen hexalead tritellurate(IV) dihexaoxotellurate(VI) dihydrate)
4. Obradovicite (heteropolymolybdate, betpakdalite) 7.GB.40
  1. Obradovicite-KCu (IMA2010-E, IMA1978-061) 7.GB.40
  2. Obradovicite-NaCu (IMA2011-079) 7.GB.40 [no] [no]
  3. Obradovicite-NaNa (IMA2011-046) 7.GB.40 [no] [no]
5. O'danielite (alluaudite: IMA1979-040) 8.AC.10
  (Na☐ZnZn_{2}[AsO_{4}][AsO_{3}(OH)]_{2})
6. Odigitriaite (IMA2015-028) 9.E?. [no] [no]
  (IUPAC: caesium pentasodium pentacalcium [diboron octatriacontaoxotetradecasilicate] difluoride)
7. Odikhinchaite (eudialyte: IMA2020-064) 9.CO. [no] [no]
8. Odinite (serpentine: IMA1988-015) 9.ED.05
9. Odintsovite (IMA1994-052) 9.CJ.50 [no]
10. Oenite (loellingite: IMA1995-007) 2.EB.10f
11. Offretite (zeolitic tectosilicate: IMA1997 s.p., 1969) 9.GD.25
  (IUPAC: potassium calcium magnesium (pentaalumotridecasilicate) hexatriacontaoxy pentadecahydrate)
12. Oftedalite (milarite: IMA2003-045a) 9.CM.05
13. Ogdensburgite (IMA1980-054) 8.DC.57
  (IUPAC: dicalcium tetrairon(III) zinc hexahydro tetrarsenate hexahydrate)
14. Ognitite (IMA2018-006a) 2.0 [no] [no] [no]
  (IUPAC: nickel bismuth telluride)
15. Ohmilite (IMA1974-031) 9.DH.10
16. Ojuelaite (arthurite: IMA1979-035) 8.DC.15
  (IUPAC: zinc diiron(III) dihydro diarsenate tetrahydrate)
17. Okanoganite-(Y) (okanoganite: IMA1979-048) 9.AJ.35
18. Okayamalite (melilite: IMA1997-002) 9.BB.10 [no]
  (IUPAC: dicalcium diboron heptaoxosilicate)
19. Okenite (Y: 1828) 9.EA.40
  (IUPAC: decacalcium hexatetracontaoxoctadecasilicate octadecahydrate)
20. Okhotskite (IMA1985-010a) 9.BG.20
21. Okieite (decavanadate: IMA2018-080) 4.0 [no] [no]
22. Okruschite (roscherite: IMA2013-097) 8.0 [no] [no]
  (IUPAC: dicalcium pentamanganese(II) tetraberyllium tetrahydro hexarsenate hexahydrate)
23. Oldhamite (galena, rocksalt: 1863) 2.CD.10
  (IUPAC: calcium sulfide)
24. Oldsite (IMA2021-075) 7.EC. [no] [no]
25. Olekminskite (IMA1989-047) 5.AB.40
  (IUPAC: distrontium dicarbonate)
26. Olenite (tourmaline: IMA1985-006) 9.CK.05
27. Olgite (aphthitalite: IMA1979-027) 8.AC.40
28. Olivenite (andalusite: 1820) 8.BB.30
  (IUPAC: dicopper hydroxide arsenate)
29. Olkhonskite (schreyerite: IMA1993-035) 4.CB.35
  (IUPAC: dichromium trititanium nonaoxide)
30. Olmiite (IMA2006-026) 9.AF.90 [no]
  (IUPAC: calcium manganese [hydrotrioxosilicate] hydroxide)
31. Olmsteadite (IMA1974-034) 8.DJ.05
  (IUPAC: potassium diiron(II) niobium dioxo diphosphate dihydrate)
32. Olsacherite (baryte: IMA1969-009) 7.AD.35
  (IUPAC: dilead (tetraoxoselenate(VI)) sulfate)
33. Olshanskyite (IMA1968-025) 6.CA.55
34. Olympite (IMA1979-065) 8.AA.30
  (IUPAC: lithium pentasodium diphosphate)
35. Omariniite (IMA2016-050) 2.0 [no] [no]
  (Cu_{8}Fe_{2}ZnGe_{2}S_{12})
36. Omeiite (löllingite: IMA1985-xxx, 1978) 2.EB.15a
  (IUPAC: osmium diarsenide)
37. Ominelite (IMA1999-025) 9.AJ.05 [no]
  (IUPAC: iron(II) trialuminium dioxy trioxoborate tetraoxysilicate)
38. Omongwaite (IMA2003-054b) 7.CD.65
  (IUPAC: disodium pentacalcium hexasulfate trihydrate)
39. Omphacite (pyroxene: IMA1988 s.p.) 9.DA.20
40. Omsite (hydrotalcite: IMA2012-025) 4.FB. [no]
  (IUPAC: dinickel iron(III) hexahydroxide [antimony hexahydroxide])
41. Ondrušite (lindackerite: IMA2008-010) 8.CE.30 [no] [no]
  (IUPAC: calcium tetracopper diarsenate di(hydroxoarsenate(V)) decahydrate)
42. Oneillite (eudialyte: IMA1998-064) 9.CO.10 [no]
43. Onoratoite (IMA1967-032) 3.DC.80
  (IUPAC: octaantimony undecaoxide dichloride)
44. Oosterboschite (IMA1970-016) 2.BC.10
  (IUPAC: hepta(lead,copper) pentaselenide)
45. Opal (a mineraloid) (Y: old) 4.DA.10 [no]
46. Ophirite (heteropolytungstate: IMA2013-017) 4.0 [no] [no]
47. Oppenheimerite (IMA2014-073) 7.0 [no] [no]
  (IUPAC: disodium uranyl disulfate trihydrate)
48. Orcelite (metalloid alloy: IMA1962 s.p., 1959) 2.AB.10
  (Ni_{(5-x)}As_{2} (x = 0.23))
49. Ordoñezite (tapiolite: 1955) 4.DB.10
  (IUPAC: zinc diantimony(V) hexaoxide)
50. Örebroite (welinite: IMA1985-039) 9.AF.75
51. Oregonite (IMA1962 s.p., 1959) 2.BB.05
  (IUPAC: iron dinickel diarsenide)
52. Oreillyite (nitride: IMA2020-030a) 1.0 [no] [no]
  (IUPAC: dichromium nitride)
53. Organovaite (labuntsovite) 9.CE.30g
  1. Organovaite-Mn (IMA2000-031) 9.CE.30g [no]
  2. Organovaite-Zn (IMA2001-006) 9.CE.30g [no]
54. Orickite (IMA1978-059) 2.FB.15
  (IUPAC: copper iron disulfide monohydrate)
55. Orientite (Y: 1921) 9.BJ.05
56. Orlandiite (selenite: IMA1998-038, IMA1998-035) 4.JH.20
  (IUPAC: trilead tetrachlorine trioxoselenate(IV) monohydrate)
57. Orlovite (mica: IMA2009-006) 9.EC.20 [no] [no]
  (IUPAC: potassium dilithium titanium undecaoxytetrasilicate fluoride)
58. Orlymanite (IMA1988-029) 9.EE.30
59. Orpiment (orpiment: 1944) 2.FA.30
  (IUPAC: trisulfa diarsenide)
60. Orschallite (sulfite: IMA1990-041) 4.JE.15
  (IUPAC: tricalcium disulfite sulfate dodecahydrate)
61. Orthobrannerite (IMA1982 s.p., 1978) 4.DH.05
  (IUPAC: uranium(IV) uranium(VI) tetratitanium dihydro dodecaoxide)
62. Orthocuproplatinum (alloy: IMA2018-124) 1.0 [no] [no]
  (IUPAC: triplatinium copper alloy)
63. Orthoclase (feldspar: IMA1962 s.p., 1823) 9.FA.30
  (IUPAC: potassium (aluminium octaoxotrisilicate)
64. Orthogersdorffite (gersdorffite-Pca21: 1982) 2.EB.25 [no] [no]
65. Orthojoaquinite (joaquinite) 9.CE.25
  1. Orthojoaquinite-(Ce) (IMA1979-081b) 9.CE.25
  2. Orthojoaquinite-(La) (IMA2000-D) 9.CE.25
66. Orthominasragrite (minasragrite: IMA2000-018) 7.DB.20
  (IUPAC: vanadium(IV) oxosulfate pentahydrate)
67. Orthopinakiolite (orthopinakiolite: IMA1962 s.p., 1960) 6.AB.40
  (IUPAC: dimagnesium manganese(III) dioxo(trioxoborate))
68. Orthoserpierite (IMA1983-022a) 7.DD.30
  (IUPAC: calcium tetracopper hexahydro disulfate trihydrate)
69. Orthowalpurgite (IMA1994-024) 8.EA.05
  (IUPAC: uranyl tetrabismuth tetraoxo diarsenate dihydrate)
70. Osakaite (ktenasite: IMA2006-049) 7.DE.40
  (IUPAC: tetrazinc hexahydro sulfate pentahydrate)
71. Osarizawaite (alunite, alunite: IMA1987 s.p., 1961 Rd) 7.BC.10
  (IUPAC: lead (dialuminium copper(II)) hexahydro disulfate)
72. Osarsite (arsenopyrite: IMA1971-025) 2.EB.20
  (IUPAC: osmium sulfarsenide)
73. Osbornite (nitride: 1870) 1.BC.15
  (IUPAC: titanium nitride)
74. Oscarkempffite (lillianite: IMA2011-029) 2.0 [no] [no]
  (Ag_{10}Pb_{4}(Sb_{17}Bi_{9})S_{48})
75. Oskarssonite (perovskite: IMA2012-088) 3.0 [no]
  (IUPAC: aluminium trifluoride)
76. Osmium (element: IMA1991 s.p., 1804 Rd) 1.AF.05
77. Osumilite (milarite) 9.CM.05
  1. Osumilite (1953) 9.CM.05
    (IUPAC: potassium diiron (pentalumino decasilicate) triacontaoxy)
  2. Osumilite-(Mg) (IMA2011-083) 9.CM.05
    (IUPAC: potassium dimagnesium trialuminium (dialuminodecasilicate) triacontaoxy)
78. Oswaldpeetersite (IMA2000-034) 5.EA.20
  (IUPAC: diuranyl dihydro carbonate tetrahydrate)
79. Otavite (calcite: 1842) 5.AB.05
  (IUPAC: cadmium carbonate)
80. Otjisumeite (IMA1978-080) 9.J0.15
  (IUPAC: lead tetragermanium nonaoxide)
81. Ottemannite (IMA1968 s.p., 1966) 2.DB.10
  (IUPAC: ditin trisulfide)
82. Ottensite (IMA2006-014) 2.MA.05 [no]
  (IUPAC: trisodium tri(trioxodiantimony) (trisulfa antimonide) trihydrate)
83. Ottohahnite (IMA2015-098) 7.0 [no] [no]
  (IUPAC: dodecasodium tetrauranyl decasulfate tetradecawater trihydrate)
84. Ottoite (lead-tellurium oxysalt: IMA2009-063) 7.0 [no] [no]
  (IUPAC: dilead tellurium pentaoxide)
85. Ottrélite (Y: 1842) 9.AF.85
  (IUPAC: manganese(II) dialuminium dihydroxide oxide silicate)
86. Otwayite (IMA1976-028) 5.DA.15
  (IUPAC: dinickel dihydroxide carbonate monohydrate)
87. Oulankaite (IMA1990-055) 2.BC.40
  (IUPAC: pentalead tetracopper tin disulfide ditelluride)
88. Ourayite (lillianite: IMA1976-007) 2.JB.40c
  (Ag_{3}Pb_{4}Bi_{5}S_{13})
89. Oursinite (IMA1982-051) 9.AK.10
  (IUPAC: cobalt diuranyl di(hydrotrioxosilicate) hexahydrate)
90. Ovamboite (germanite: IMA1992-039) 2.CB.30 [no]
  (Cu_{10}Fe_{3}WGe_{3}S_{16})
91. Overite (overite: 1940) 8.DH.20
  (IUPAC: calcium magnesium aluminium hydroxide diphosphate tetrahydrate)
92. Owensite (IMA1993-061) 2.FC.05
  ((Ba,Pb)_{6}(Cu^{1+},Fe,Ni)_{25}S_{27})
93. Owyheeite (Y: 1920) 2.HC.35
  (Ag_{3}Pb_{10}Sb_{11}S_{28})
94. Oxammite (oxalate: 1870) 10.AB.55
  (IUPAC: diammonium oxalate monohydrate)
95. Oxo-magnesio-hastingsite [Ca-amphibole: IMA2011-035] 9.D?. [no] [no]
96. Oxo-mangani-leakeite [Na-amphibole: IMA2015-035] 9.D?. [no] [no]
97. Oxybismutomicrolite (pyrochlore: IMA2019-047) 4.0 [no] [no]
98. Oxycalciopyrochlore (pyrochlore: IMA2010 s.p., IMA1978-052 Rd) 4.0
  (IUPAC: dicalcium diniobium hexaoxide oxide)
99. Oxycalciomicrolite (pyrochlore: IMA2019-110) 4.0 [no] [no]
100. Oxycalcioroméite (pyrochlore: IMA2012-022) 4.0 [no] [no]
  (IUPAC: dicalcium diantimony(V) heptaoxide)
101. Oxy-chromium-dravite (tourmaline: IMA2011-097) 9.CK. [no] [no]
102. Oxy-dravite (tourmaline: IMA2012-004a) 9.CK.05 [no] [no]
103. Oxy-foitite (tourmaline: IMA2016-069) 9.CK.05 [no] [no]
104. Oxykinoshitalite (mica: IMA2004-013) 9.EC.35
105. Oxynatromicrolite (pyrochlore: IMA2013-063) 4.0 [no] [no]
106. Oxyphlogopite (mica: IMA2009-069) 9.EC.20 [no] [no]
107. Oxyplumboroméite (pyrochlore: IMA2013-042) 4.0 [no] [no]
  (IUPAC: dilead diantimony heptaoxide)
108. Oxy-schorl (tourmaline: IMA2011-011) 9.CK. [no] [no]
109. Oxystannomicrolite (pyrochlore: IMA2010 s.p., 1968 Rd) 4.0 (red. )
  (IUPAC: ditin ditantalum heptaoxide)
110. Oxystibiomicrolite (pyrochlore: IMA2010 s.p., 1938 Rd) 4.0 (red. )
111. Oxy-vanadium-dravite (tourmaline: IMA2011-E, IMA1999-050 Rd) 9.CK.05 [no]
112. Oxyvanite (IMA2008-044) 4.CB.30 [no]
  (IUPAC: divanadium(III) vanadium(IV) pentaoxide)
113. Oxyyttrobetafite-(Y) (IMA2022-002)
114. Oyelite (IMA1980-103) 9.HA.80
  (IUPAC: decacalcium diboron nonadocosaoxoctasilicate dodecahydrate)
115. Oyonite (IMA2018-002) 2.0 [no] [no]
116. Ozernovskite (tellurate: IMA2021-059) 4.JN. [no] [no]
117. Ozerovaite (IMA2016-019) 8. [no] [no]
  (IUPAC: disodium potassium trialuminium tetrarsenate)
