= Magnesium sulfide =

Inorganic compound generated in the production of metallic iron

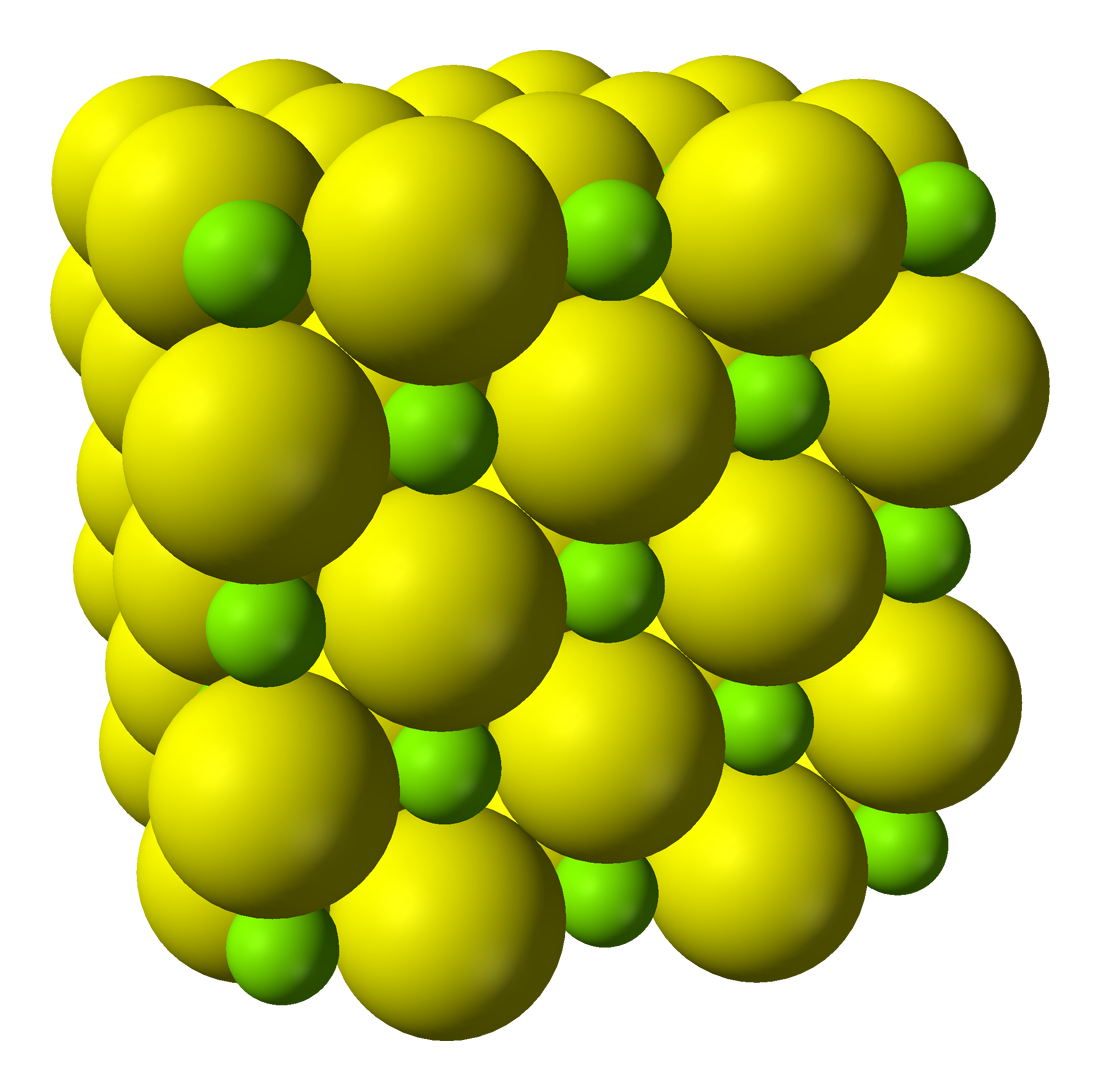
- Magnesium sulfide crystal structure

Names
- Other names Niningerite

Identifiers
CAS Number	12032-36-9
3D model (JSmol)	Interactive image
ChemSpider	8305407
ECHA InfoCard	100.031.597
EC Number	234-771-1
PubChem CID	82824
UNII	TWD834A2KD
CompTox Dashboard (EPA)	DTXSID2065179
- InChI: InChI=1S/Mg.S/q+2;-2 Key: QENHCSSJTJWZAL-UHFFFAOYSA-N; InChI=1/Mg.S/q+2;-2 Key: QENHCSSJTJWZAL-UHFFFAOYAO
- SMILES: [Mg+2].[S-2]

Properties
Chemical formula	MgS
Molar mass	56.38 g/mol
Appearance	white to reddish brown powder
Density	2.84 g/cm^{3}
Melting point	2,000 °C (3,630 °F; 2,270 K) approx.
Solubility in water	decomposes

Structure
Crystal structure	Halite (cubic), cF8
Space group	Fm3̅m, No. 225
Coordination geometry	cubic

Thermochemistry
Heat capacity (C)	45.6 J/mol K
Std molar entropy (S^{⦵}_{298})	50.3 J/mol K
Std enthalpy of formation (Δ_{f}H^{⦵}_{298})	−347 kJ/mol

Hazards
- Occupational safety and health (OHS/OSH)
Main hazards	Source of H_{2}S

Related compounds
Other anions	Magnesium oxide
Other cations	Calcium sulfide; Strontium sulfide; Barium sulfide
- Except where otherwise noted, data are given for materials in their standard state (at 25 °C [77 °F], 100 kPa). verify (what is ?) Infobox references

Magnesium sulfide is an inorganic compound with the formula MgS. It is a white crystalline material but often is encountered in an impure form that is brown and non-crystalline powder. It is generated industrially in the production of metallic iron.

== Preparation and general properties ==
MgS is formed by the reaction of sulfur or hydrogen sulfide with magnesium. It crystallizes in the rock salt structure as its most stable phase, its zinc blende and wurtzite structures can be prepared by molecular beam epitaxy. The chemical properties of MgS resemble those of related ionic sulfides such as those of sodium, barium, or calcium. It reacts with oxygen to form the corresponding sulfate, magnesium sulfate. MgS reacts with water to give hydrogen sulfide and magnesium hydroxide.

== Applications ==
In the BOS steelmaking process, sulfur is the first element to be removed. Sulfur is removed from the impure blast furnace iron by the addition of several hundred kilograms of magnesium powder by a lance. Magnesium sulfide is formed, which then floats on the molten iron and is removed.

MgS is a wide band-gap direct semiconductor of interest as a blue-green emitter, a property that has been known since the early 1900s. The wide-band gap property also allows the use of MgS as photo-detector for short wavelength ultraviolet light.

== Occurrence ==
Aside from being a component of some slags, MgS is a rare nonterrestrial mineral niningerite detected in some meteorites. It is also a solid solution component along with CaS and FeS in oldhamite. MgS is also found in the circumstellar envelopes of certain evolved carbon stars, i. e., those with C/O > 1.

== Safety ==
MgS evolves hydrogen sulfide upon contact with moisture.
