= 785 Zwetana =

Main-belt asteroid

Discovery
- Discovered by: Adam Massinger
- Discovery site: Heidelberg
- Discovery date: 30 March 1914

Designations
- Alternative designations: 1914 UN

Orbital characteristics
- Epoch 31 July 2016 (JD 2457600.5)
- Uncertainty parameter 0
- Observation arc: 95.43 yr (34854 d)
- Aphelion: 3.1099 AU (465.23 Gm)
- Perihelion: 2.0273 AU (303.28 Gm)
- Semi-major axis: 2.5686 AU (384.26 Gm)
- Eccentricity: 0.21073
- Orbital period (sidereal): 4.12 yr (1503.6 d)
- Mean anomaly: 268.20°
- Mean motion: 0° 14^{m} 21.912^{s} / day
- Inclination: 12.769°
- Longitude of ascending node: 71.882°
- Argument of perihelion: 131.607°

Physical characteristics
- Mean diameter: 50 ± 2 km (composite estimate)
- Synodic rotation period: 8.919 h 8.8882 h (0.37034 d)
- Geometric albedo: 0.12 ± 0.01 (composite estimate)
- Absolute magnitude (H): 9.45

785 Zwetana is a minor planet orbiting the Sun that was discovered by Adam Massinger, an assistant at the Heidelberg Observatory, on March 30, 1914. It was named for the daughter of Kiril Popoff, a Bulgarian astronomer. This asteroid is orbiting 2.57 AU from the Sun with an eccentricity (ovalness) of 0.21 and a period of 4.12 yr. The orbital plane is inclined by an angle of 12.8° to the plane of the ecliptic.

This asteroid spans a girth of ~48.5 km and it has a Tholen taxonomic class of M. Radar observations indicate that it is almost certainly metallic. The near infrared spectra suggests the presence of spinel on the surface, which is indicative of calcium–aluminium-rich inclusions. The best meteorite analog to the near infrared spectrum of this object is the enstatite chondrite, Abee.

In 1990, the asteroid was observed from the European Southern Observatory, allowing a composite light curve to be produced that showed a rotation period of 8.919±0.004 h and a brightness variation of 0.13±0.01 in magnitude. 2013 observations from the Palmer Divide Observatory found a rotation period of 8.885 hours with a magnitude amplitude of 0.18. This is consistent with other published results.
