= McAfee (disambiguation) =

McAfee is an antivirus and computer security company.

McAfee may refer also to:

== Places in the United States ==
- McAfee, Kentucky, unincorporated community in Mercer County, Kentucky
- McAfee, New Jersey, an unincorporated area in Vernon Township, New Jersey
- McAfee Coliseum or RingCentral Coliseum, a stadium in Oakland, California
- McAfee Peak, in the Independence Mountains of Nevada

== Other uses ==
- McAfee (surname), including a list of people with the surname McAfee and MacAfee
- McAfee, the tune to the hymn "Near to the Heart of God" written by Cleland Boyd McAfee

== See also ==
- McAfee Knob, a mountain feature on the Appalachian Trail in Virginia
- Candler-McAfee, Georgia, a census-designated place
- McCafé, a fast-food chain owned by McDonald's
