= Zaklodzie =

Zaklodzie or Zakłodzie may refer to:

- Zakłodzie, West Pomeranian Voivodeship
- Zakłodzie, Lublin Voivodeship
- Zakłodzie meteorite
