= McAfee (surname) =

McAfee (/ˈmækəfiː/ MAK-ə-fee) is a surname of Irish and Scottish origin. The name is an Anglicisation of the Gaelic Mac Dhuibhshíthe, meaning "son of Duibhshíth". The personal name, Duibhshíth, was composed of two elements: dubh meaning "black", and síth meaning "peace". The surname has been in Ireland since the seventeenth century. McAfee is less frequently attested than Mahaffy, a name of similar origin.

== List of persons with the surname ==
- Andrew McAfee, IT researcher
- Annalena McAfee, British writer
- Anndi McAfee (born 1979), American actress and singer
- Charles F. McAfee (born 1932), African American architect, housing activist, and businessman
- Cheryl L. McAfee (born c. 1958), African American architect
- Cleland Boyd McAfee (1866–1944), American theologian and hymn writer
- Fiona Apple McAfee-Maggart (born 1977), American singer-songwriter
- Fred McAfee (born 1968), American professional football player
- George McAfee (1918–2009), American professional football player
- John McAfee (1945–2021), American computer programmer and founder of McAfee, Inc.
- Ken MacAfee (born 1956), American football tight end in the 1970s
- Ken MacAfee (end) (1929–2007), American football end in the 1950s
- Larry McAfee (1955–1995), American figure in the right to die movement
- Loy McAfee (1868–1941), American surgeon, bibliographer, and editor
- Mara McAfee (1929-1984), American artist
- Mildred H. McAfee (1900–1994), American academic and WAVES (Navy) leader
- Pat McAfee (born 1987), American professional football player and wrestler
- Preston McAfee (born 1956), American economist
- Robert B. McAfee (1784–1849), American politician
- Robert McAfee Brown (1920–2001), American theologian
- Scott McAfee, American actor
- Scott F. McAfee, American judge
- Shadrick McAfee (born 1974), American professional football player
- Walter McAfee (1914–1995), American scientist

== See also ==
- McCaffrey, surname
- McAtee, surname
