= Itqiy meteorite =

Meteorite found in Western Sahara

- Type: Chondrite (ongoing scientific debate)
- Class: Enstatite chondrite (ongoing scientific debate)
- Group: EH7-an (ongoing scientific debate)
- Parent body: NWA2526-Itqiy
- Composition: Enstatite (78 %), meteoric iron (22 %), sulfides.
- Country: Western Sahara
- Coordinates: 26°35′27″N 12°57′8″W
- Observed fall: Yes
- Fall date: 1990
- Found date: 1990 + 2000-07
- TKW: 0.410 kilograms (0.90 lb) + 4.310 kilograms (9.50 lb)

The Itqiy meteorite is an enstatite-rich stony-iron meteorite. It is classified as an enstatite chondrite of the EH group that was nearly melted and is therefore very unusual for that group. Other classifications have been proposed and are an ongoing scientific debate.

== History ==
Itqiy was initially attributed to a 1990 fireball in Western Sahara. One stone was recovered by a nomad, and a second stone was recovered in July 2000 by Marc, Luc, and Jim Labenne who were searching for meteorites in the same location. The meteorite was analyzed in 2001. Later work showed that the meteorite had fallen nearly 6,000 years ago and was not associated with any recent fireball.

== Mineralogy and petrology ==
Itqiy is a stony meteorite consisting of 78% enstatite and 22% meteoric iron. The meteoric iron is kamacite with 5.77% nickel. Small amounts of other minerals include troilite, Mg-Mn-Fe sulfides and Fe-Cr sulfides.

== Classification ==
The meteorite was described as an "ungrouped stony meteorite" in 2000, and reclassified as an "ungrouped enstatite meteorite" in 2001. In 2006, Itqiy was classified as a member of the EH enstatite chondrites, with a petrologic type of 7, emphasizing that it was a strongly metamorphosed EH chondrite.

Itqiy represents a rock that formed through partial melting of an EH chondrite. This process removed the more volatile minerals like plagioclase. In 2010-1 it was proposed that Itqiy, QUE 94204, QUE 97289, QUE 97348, NWA 2526 and possibly Yamato 793225 form a new group from the same parent body that should be called "primitive enstatite achondrites".

== See also ==
- Glossary of meteoritics
