= Zaklodzie meteorite =

Meteorite found in Poland

Zakłodzie meteorite
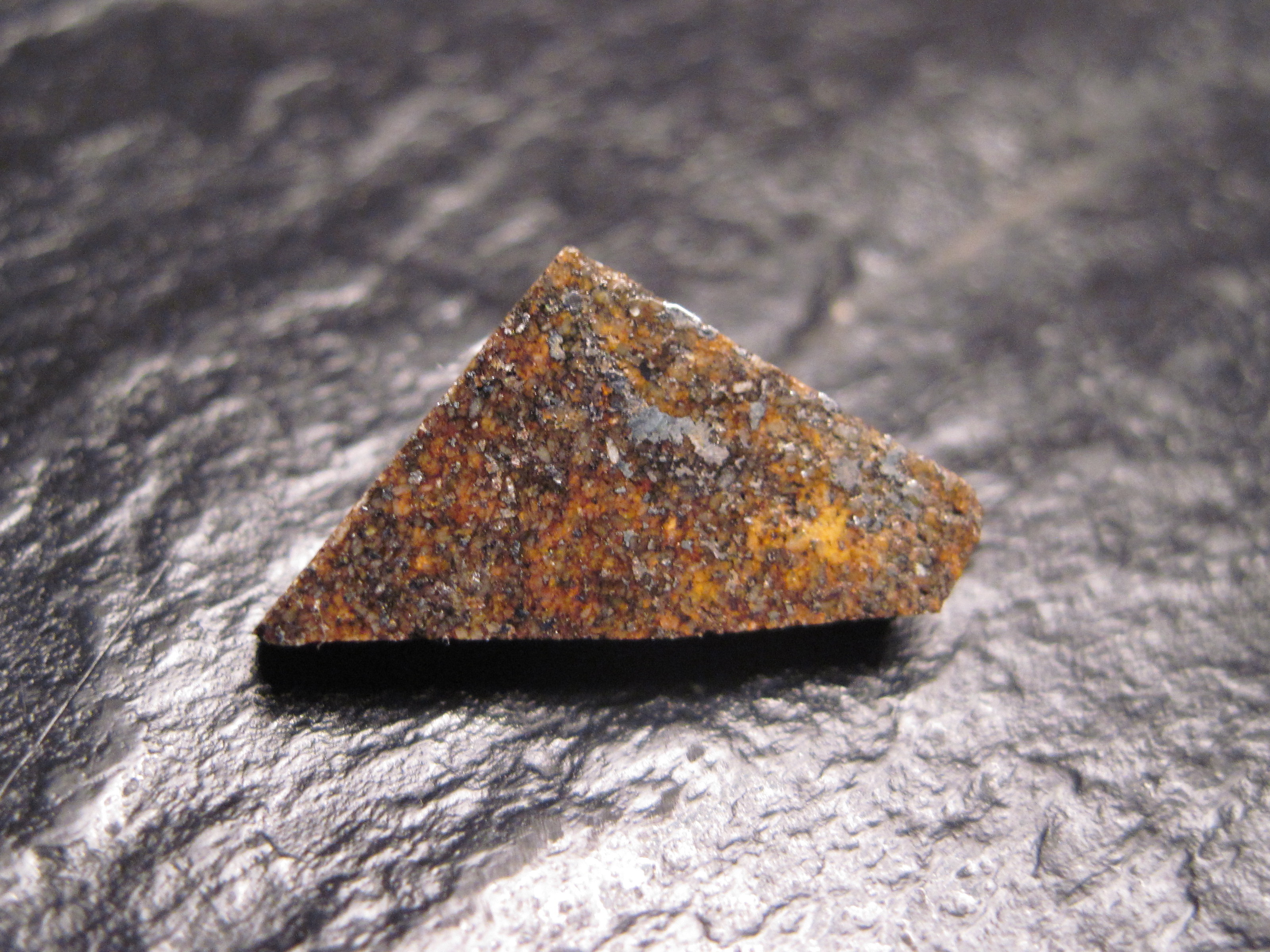
- Type: enstatite achondrite (ongoing scientific debate)
- Parent body: Zakłodzie-NWA 4301
- Composition: enstatite (60 %), meteoric iron (20 %), troilite (10 %), feldspar (10 %)
- Country: Poland
- Region: Zamość, Lubelskie
- Coordinates: 50°45′46″N 22°51′58″E
- Observed fall: No
- Fall date: Possibly 1897-04-21
- Found date: 1998-09
- TKW: 8.68 kilograms (19.1 lb)

The Zakłodzie meteorite is a stony-iron meteorite found in Poland in 1998. Its mass is 8.68 kilograms (19.1 lb). It is composed predominantly from enstatite and meteoric iron. Currently classified as an ungrouped enstatite achondrite its classification is still an ongoing scientific debate.

== Naming and history ==
The Zakłodzie meteorite was found beside a dirt road by Stanisław Jachymek who was searching for fossils and rocks. The site lies south of the village Zakłodzie (Lublin Voivodeship), after which the meteorite is named.

A fireball, which may well have been the Zakłodzie meteorite, was seen in the area of the find on 21 April 1897; its weathering is consistent with such an age. As of 20 December 2012 part slices were on sale at US$100/g.

== Mineralogy ==
The meteorite is composed of 60% orthoenstatite, 20% meteoric iron, 10% troilite and 10% feldspar. Accessory minerals include schreibersite, oldhamite, alabandite, keilite and amphibole. The meteoric iron has a Nickel content of 16%. The mineral composition is similar to an enstatite chondrite with strongly metamorphosed chondrules. A second interpretation is that the textures are a result of cumulate crystallization or an impact-melt breccia. It's the type locality of two minerals: browneite (IMA 2012-008) and buseckite (IMA 2011-070).

== Classification ==
The meteorite was classified as an "ungrouped enstatite-rich meteorite" in 2000. In 2005 it was proposed that the meteorite was the product of magma crystallization and therefore an achondrite. The magma originated from the partial melt of an enstatite chondrite source. It was therefore proposed that the Zakłodzie meteorite should be classified as a "primitive enstatite achondrite". It was classified as an Aubrite-an (anomalous) in 2006. Currently the recommended classification is that the Zakłodzie meteorite is an ungrouped enstatite achondrite.

Some scientists propose that many aubrites and enstatite achondrites are in fact impact breccias or impact-melt breccias. The later being proposed for Zakłodzie and NWA 4301. The main arguments for this hypothesis are the relics of chondrules, the euhedral enstatites surrounded by meteoric iron and the occurrence of keilite. Keilite is possibly a product of reactions that take place when enstatite achondrites are melted and quenched (a quick decrease in temperature). This could happen during impact events on the surface of the parent body.

== See also ==
- Glossary of meteoritics
