= Abée =

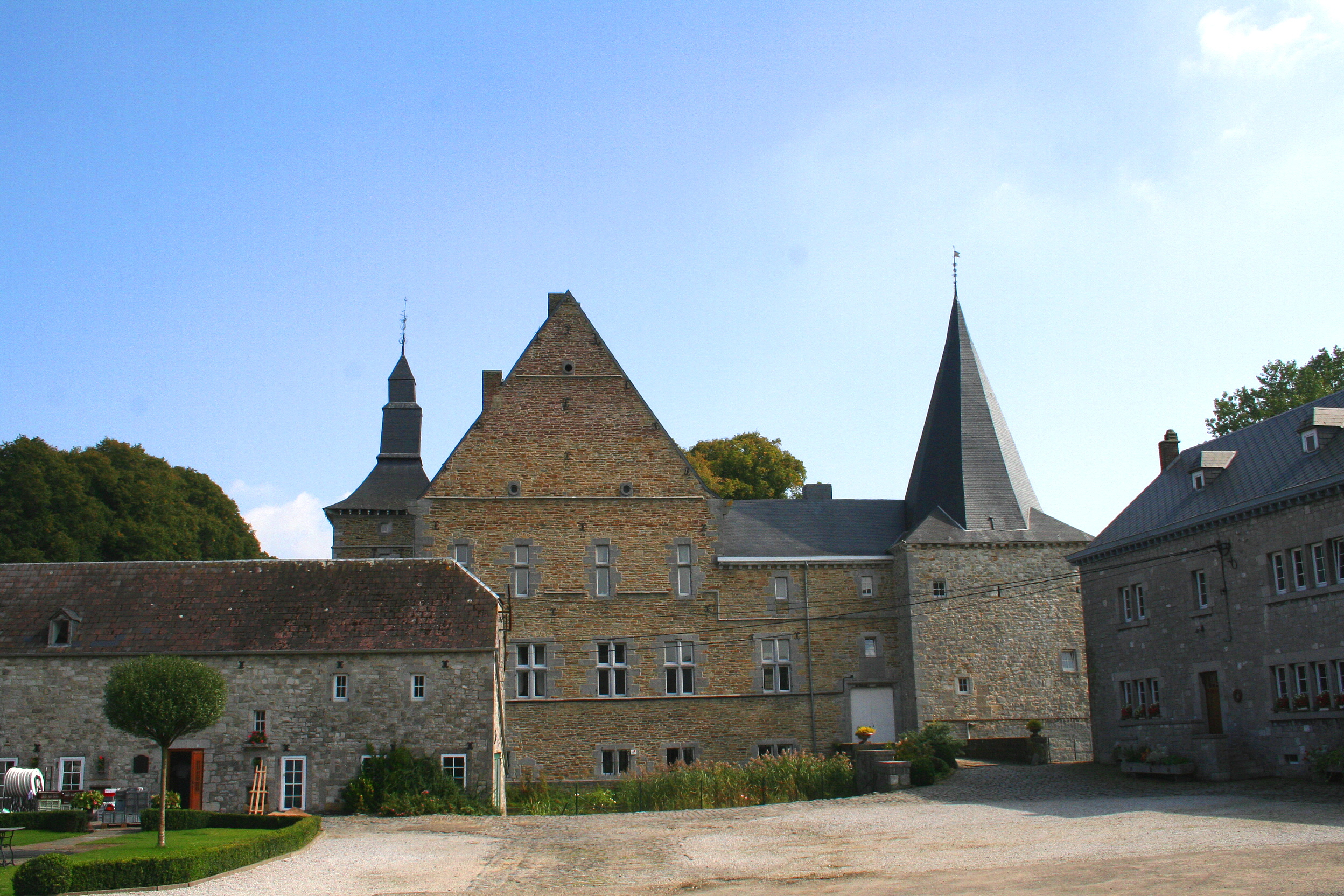
- Abée Castle in Abée

- Location within Belgium Location within Europe
- Coordinates: 50°28′N 05°21′E
- Country: Belgium
- Region: Wallonia
- Province: Liège
- Municipality: Tinlot

Abée (French pronunciation: [abe]) is a village and district of the municipality of Tinlot, located in the province of Liège in Wallonia, Belgium.

The first time the village is mentioned in written sources is 1131. At the northern outskirts of the village lies Abée Castle; its oldest parts date to the 13th century. The village church has medieval foundations but derives its current appearance from reconstruction works done in the 18th and 19th centuries.
