= McAbee =

McAbee is a surname. Notable people with the surname include:

- Cory McAbee (born 1961), American writer, director, singer, and songwriter
- Palmer McAbee (1894–1970), American blues harmonica player

== See also ==
- McAbee Fossil Beds
- McAfee (surname)
