= Blithfield meteorite =

Meteorite

Blithfield
- Structural classification: Breccia
- Class: Chondrite
- Group: E6
- Shock stage
- Weathering grade
- Country: Canada
- Region: Ontario, Canada
- Coordinates: 45°30′22″N 76°57′57″W
- Observed fall: no
- Found date: August 13, 1910
- TKW: 1.83 kilograms (4.0 lb)

The Blithfield meteorite was found by Joseph Legree in Blithfield Township, Renfrew County, Ontario and measured about 8 centimetres (3.1 in) x 10 centimetres (3.9 in) x 13.5 centimetres (5.3 in). The main mass is now in the Canadian National collection, Ottawa. Blithfield is an enstatite chondrite, a group of very unusual meteorites that were formed in a very reducing atmosphere. It is a breccia, one of only five known enstatite chondrite breccias.

== See also ==
- Glossary of meteoritics
- Meteorite find
