= Keilite =

Iron-magnesium sulfide mineral

General
- Category: Sulfides
- Formula: (Fe^{2+},Mg)S
- IMA symbol: Ke
- Strunz classification: 2/C.15-15
- Dana classification: 2.8.1.9
- Crystal system: Isometric
- Crystal class: Hexoctahedral
- Space group: Fm3̅m (No. 225)
- Unit cell: a = 5.1717(18)Å

Identification
- Formula mass: 81.91 gm
- Colour: Grey
- Crystal habit: Microscopic crystals
- Cleavage: Distinct/good
- Tenacity: Brittle
- Luster: Metallic
- Diaphaneity: Opaque
- Specific gravity: 3.958
- Density: 3.958

Keilite is an iron-magnesium sulfide mineral with the chemical formula (Fe,Mg)S) that is found in enstatite chondrites. Keilite is the iron-dominant analog of niningerite. Keilite is named after Klaus Keil (born 1934).

== Occurrences ==
Examples of keilite occurrences are enstatite chondrites and the Zakłodzie meteorite. It appears to be confined to impact-melt influenced enstatite chondrites that were quenched. There are also some meteorites interpreted as impact-melt breccias that do not contain keilite. This is explained as a deeper burial after impact, which slowed cooling and enabled retrograde reactions (diapthoresis) to take place.
