= Robert McAfee Brown =

American Presbyterian theologian and activist (1920–2001)

The Reverend Robert McAfee Brown
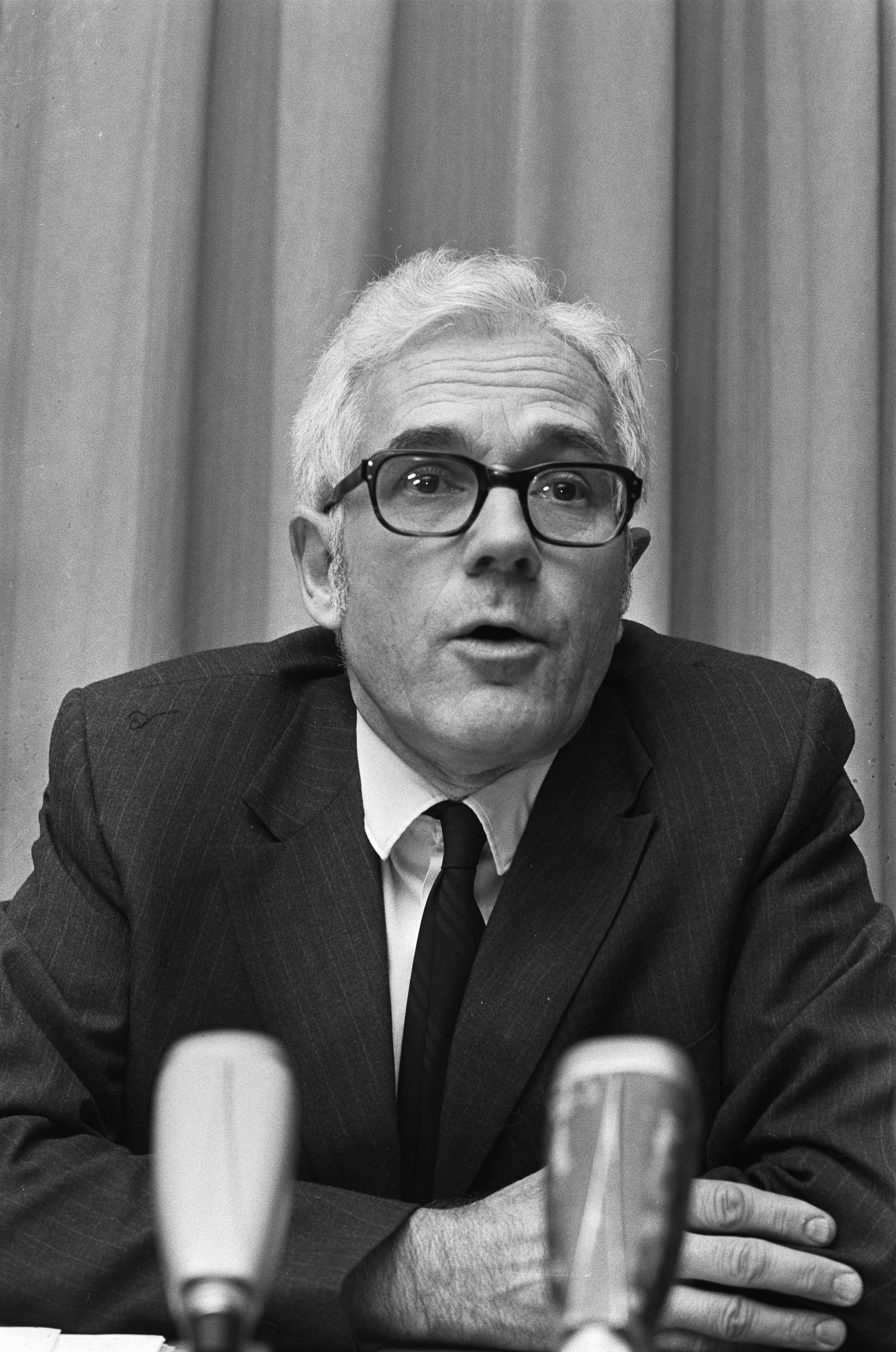
- Brown in 1973
- Born: May 28, 1920; Carthage, Illinois, US
- Died: September 4, 2001 (aged 81); Greenfield, Massachusetts, US
- Spouse: Sydney Thomson Brown (m. 1944)

Ecclesiastical career
- Religion: Christianity (Presbyterian)
- Church: United Presbyterian Church in the United States of America
- Ordained: 1944

Academic background
- Education: Amherst College; Union Theological Seminary; Columbia University
- Doctoral advisor: John C. Bennett
- Influences: Reinhold Niebuhr

Academic work
- Discipline: Theology
- School or tradition: Liberal Christianity
- Institutions: Macalester College; Union Theological Seminary; Stanford University; Pacific School of Religion

Robert McAfee Brown (1920–2001) was an American Presbyterian minister, theologian, and activist.

== Life ==
Born on May 28, 1920, in Carthage, Illinois, Brown was the son of a Presbyterian minister and the grandson of theologian and Presbyterian minister Cleland Boyd McAfee. He earned a bachelor's degree from Amherst College in 1943 and was ordained a Presbyterian minister in 1944. Brown earned a Bachelor of Divinity degree from Union Theological Seminary in 1945, and served as a United States Navy chaplain from 1945 to 1946. The recipient of a Fulbright grant, Brown studied at the University of Oxford before completing a doctorate in the philosophy of religion at Columbia University in 1951. He married Sydney Thomson, and had four children.

Initially, Brown taught at his alma mater, Union Theological Seminary, before accepting an appointment as Professor of Religion at Stanford University in 1962. There he became an international leader in civil rights, ecumenical and social justice causes. Brown campaigned against US involvement in the Vietnam War and was a co-founder of the group Clergy and Laity Concerned About Vietnam. He was also a Protestant observer at the Second Vatican Council.

Brown left Stanford in 1975 to return to Union as Professor of World Christianity and Ecumenism, but soon resigned and moved back to the Bay Area, where he taught at the Pacific School of Religion in Berkeley, California, until his retirement in 1984. Brown was the author of 29 books, and his papers are now held at the Graduate Theological Union. Brown died on September 4, 2001, in Greenfield, Massachusetts, survived by his wife Sydney Thomson Brown, three sons, Peter, Mark and Tom and a daughter, Alison Ehara-Brown. A lecture series is named in his honor.

== Published works ==
- P. T. Forsyth: Prophet for Today (1952)
- The Bible Speaks to You (1955, new ed. 1985)
- The Spirit of Protestantism (1961)
- Observer in Rome: A Protestant Report on the Vatican Council (1964)
- The Collect'd Writings of St. Hereticus (1964)
- The Ecumenical Revolution: An Interpretation of the Catholic-Protestant Dialogue (1973)
- Religion and Violence: A Primer for White Americans (1973)
- Is Faith Obsolete? (1974)
- Frontiers for the Church Today (1974)
- Theology in a New Key: Responding to Liberation Theology (1978)
- The Hereticus Papers: (being Volume II of "The Collect'd Writings of St. Hereticus") (1979)
- Gustavo Gutierrez: An Introduction to Liberation Theology (1980)
- Making Peace in the Global Village (1981)
- Unexpected News: Reading the Bible with Third World Eyes (1984)
- Saying Yes and Saying No: On Rendering to God and Caesar (1986)
- The Essential Reinhold Niebuhr: Selected Essays and Addresses (1986)
- Spirituality and Liberation: Overcoming the Great Fallacy (1988)
- Elie Wiesel: Messenger to All Humanity (1989)
- Persuade Us to Rejoice: The Liberating Power of Fiction (1992)
- Liberation Theology: An Introductory Guide (1993)
- Dark the Night, Wild the Sea (1998)
- Reflections over the Long Haul: A Memoir (2005)
