= Perryite =

Mineral found in meteorites

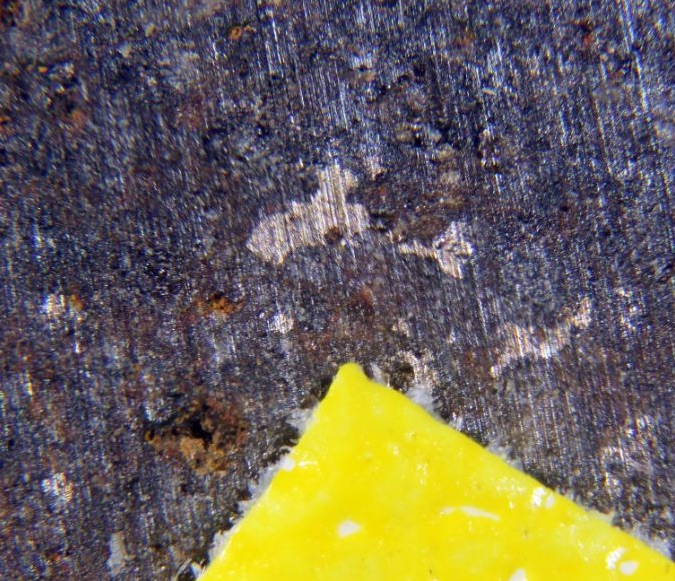

General
- Category: Minerals
- Formula: (Ni,Fe)8(Si,P)3
- IMA symbol: PRY

Identification
- Color: "Cream-yellow"
- Tenacity: Ductile

Perryite is a nickel silicide mineral. It is found in extremely silicon-rich meteorites. The type material is housed at the National Museum of Natural History in Washington. It was first found in Horse Creek and described in 1963 by Fredriksson and Wickman. It was named after Stuart Hoffman Perry, an American meteorite collector. The mineral is typically found intermixed with troilite, an iron sulfide. It is a minor constituent of metal enstatite chondrite meteorites.
