= Fraiture =

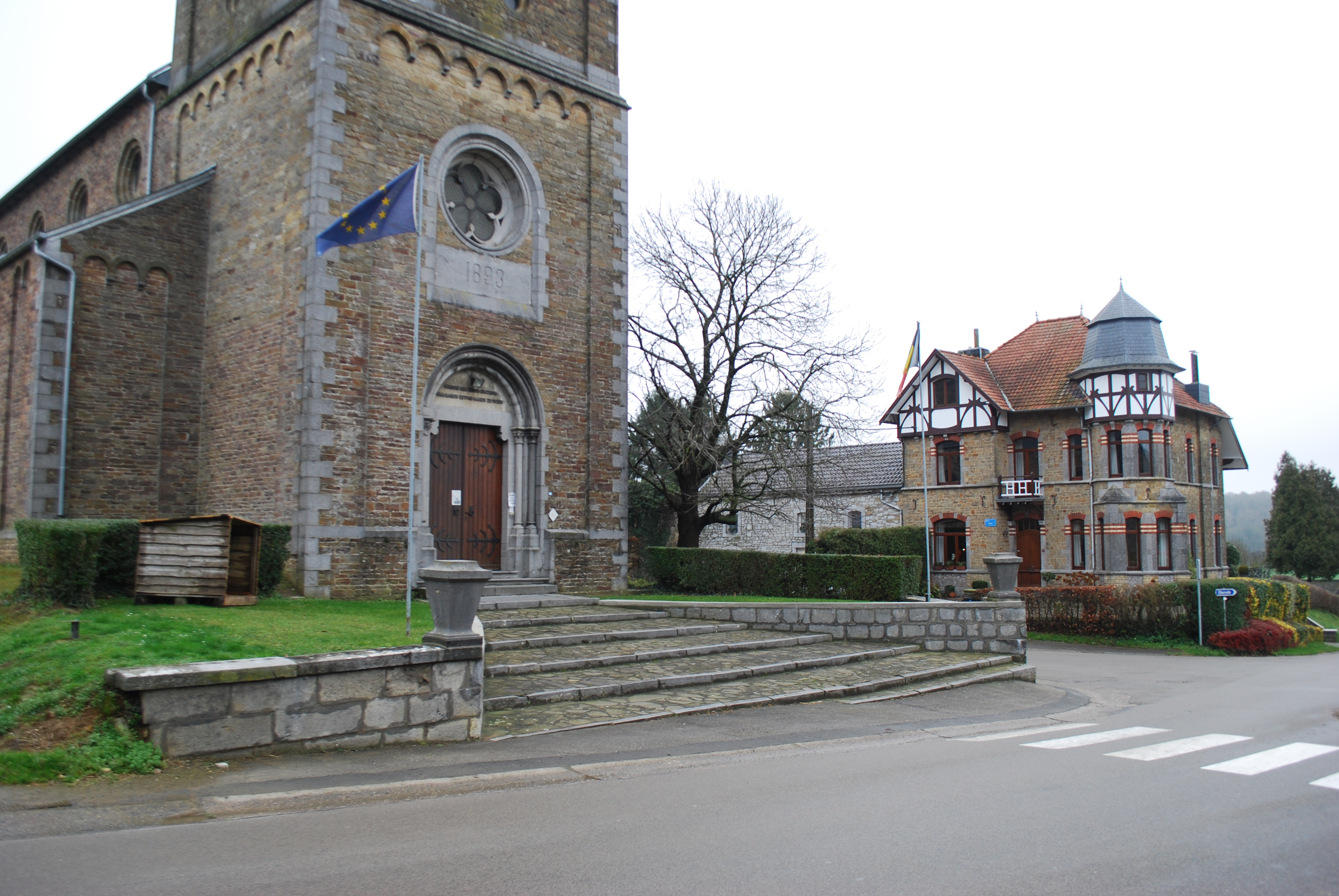
- Fraiture

- Location within Belgium Location within Europe
- Coordinates: 50°28′N 05°25′E
- Country: Belgium
- Region: Wallonia
- Province: Liège
- Municipality: Tinlot

Fraiture (French pronunciation: [fʁɛtyʁ]) is a village and district of the municipality of Tinlot, located in the province of Liège in Wallonia, Belgium.

Archaeological discoveries indicate that the area has been settled at least since Roman times, but the village is mentioned in written sources for the first time in 965. The current village church is a Neo-Romanesque building built 1892–1893. In the late 18th century, a château was built in Fraiture, but it was destroyed in a fire in 1963. Remains of an older estate also exist in the village.
