= List of protected heritage sites in Tinlot =

This table shows an overview of the protected heritage sites in the Walloon town Tinlot. This list is part of Belgium's national heritage.

| Object | Year/architect | Town/section | Address | Coordinates | Number^{?} | Image |
|---|---|---|---|---|---|---|
| Lime tree ^{(nl)} ^{(fr)} | | Tinlot | | 50.467163°N 5.333241°E | 61081-CLT-0003-01 Info | Linde |
| The chancel and nave of the church of Saint Martin at Scry ^{(nl)} ^{(fr)} | | Tinlot | | 50.499476°N 5.376765°E | 61081-CLT-0004-01 Info | Het koor en het schip van de kerk Saint Martin te Scry |
| Place du Baty ^{(nl)} ^{(fr)} | | Tinlot | | 50.460127°N 5.400586°E | 61081-CLT-0006-01 Info | |
| Notre Dame Church and cemetery wall, ensemble of church and surrounding area ^{(nl)} ^{(fr)} | | Tinlot | | 50.464194°N 5.328403°E | 61081-CLT-0007-01 Info | |
| Facades and roofs of the keep of the house and the tower on either side of the residential building of the castle of Abee and the ensemble of the castle, the farm and surrounding land ^{(nl)} ^{(fr)} | | Tinlot | | 50.476396°N 5.351730°E | 61081-CLT-0008-01 Info | Gevels en daken van de donjon van het huis en de toren aan weerszijden van de woongebouw van het kasteel van Abée en het ensemble van het kasteel, de boerderij en het omliggende land |

== See also ==
- List of protected heritage sites in Liège (province)
