= Owensite =

Mineral

General
- Category: Minerals
- Formula: (Ba, Pb)_{6}(Cu, Fe, Ni)_{25}S_{27}
- IMA symbol: Owe
- Crystal system: Isometric
- Crystal class: Hexoctahedral
- Space group: cubic

Identification
- Color: pale brownish grey
- Luster: Metallic

Owensite is a mineral discovered in the Wellgreen Cu-Ni-Pt-Pd deposit, Yukon, with the formula (Ba, Pb)_{6}(Cu, Fe, Ni)_{25}S_{27}. The mineral is related to djerfisherite, but lacks the Cl and monovalent metals found in the latter.

== Name ==
Owensite was named in 1994 in recognition of DeAlton R. Owens, a mineralogist at the Canada Centre for Mineral and Energy Technology.

== See also ==
- List of minerals recognized by the International Mineralogical Association (O)
