= Tinlot =

Municipality in Liège Province, Wallonia, Belgium

- Municipality
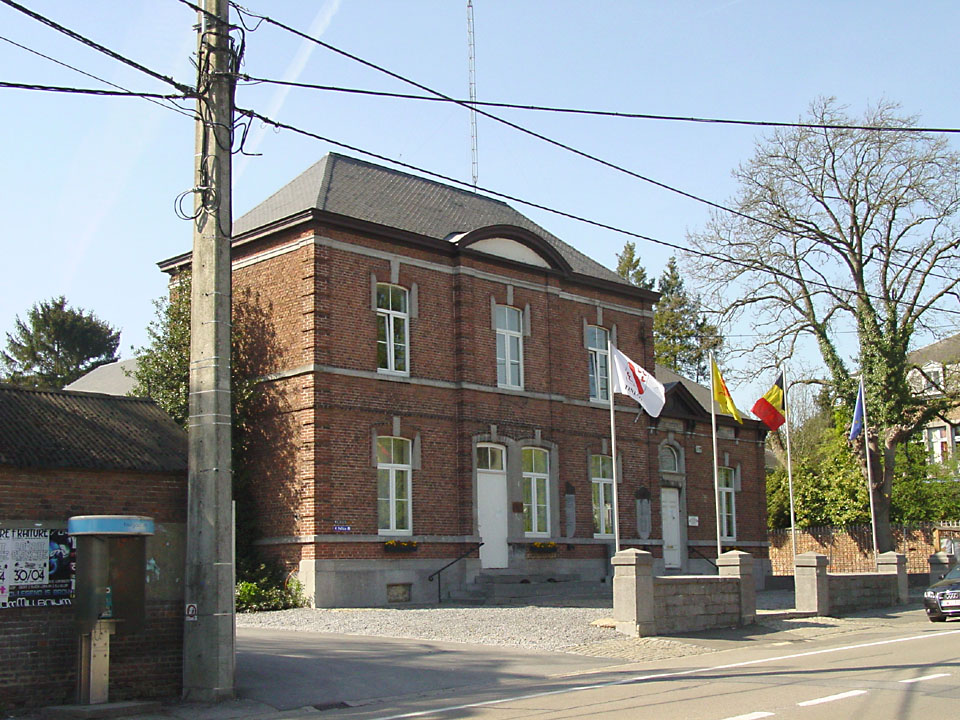
- Tinlot town hall

- Flag Coat of arms

- Location of Tinlot in the province of Liège
- Interactive map of Tinlot
- Location in Belgium
- Coordinates: 50°29′N 05°22′E
- Country: Belgium
- Community: French Community
- Region: Wallonia
- Province: Liège
- Arrondissement: Huy

Government
  - Mayor: Christine Guyot (TP)
  - Governing party: TP

Area
  - Total: 37.26 km^{2} (14.39 sq mi)

Population (2018-01-01)
  - Total: 2,709
  - Density: 72.71/km^{2} (188.3/sq mi)
- Postal codes: 4557
- NIS code: 61081
- Area codes: 085
- Website: www.tinlot.be

Tinlot (French pronunciation: [tɛ̃lo]) is a municipality of Wallonia located in the province of Liège, Belgium.

On January 1, 2006 Tinlot had a total population of 2,346. The total area is 37.12 km^{2} which gives a population density of 63 inhabitants per km^{2}.

The municipality consists of the following districts: Abée, Fraiture, Ramelot, Seny, and Soheit-Tinlot.

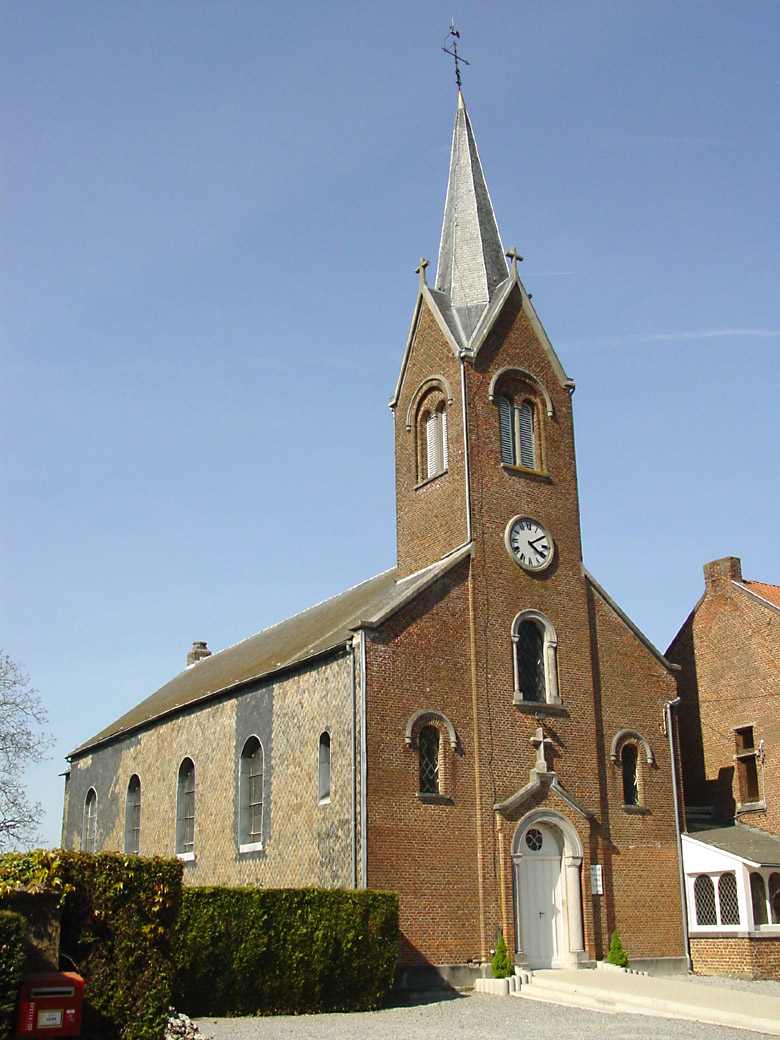
Church in Tinlot

== See also ==
- List of protected heritage sites in Tinlot
