= Osbornite =

Nitride mineral

General
- Category: Minerals
- Formula: TiN
- IMA symbol: Obn
- Strunz classification: 1.BC.15
- Dana classification: 1.1.19.1
- Crystal system: isometric
- Space group: Fm3m
- Unit cell: a = 4.24173 Å Z=4 V=76.32 Å^{3}

Structure

Identification
- Formula mass: 61.874
- Colour: golden yellow
- Tenacity: brittle
- Mohs scale hardness: 8.5
- Luster: metallic
- Streak: yellow
- Diaphaneity: opaque
- Density: 5.24 g/mL
- Melting point: 2930 °C

Osbornite is a naturally occurring variety of titanium nitride. It was first discovered in the Bustee meteorite in the late nineteenth century. Its crystals are golden-yellow octahedrons, combined with oldhamite. It is friable and does not dissolve in acids.

Osbornite is usually found only in meteorites, but osbornite of terrestrial origin has been found in one location in the continental collision zone of Tibet. Osbornite requires extraordinarily low redox potential and very high temperatures (2500–3000 K) to form.
