= Steve Abee =

American poet

Steve Abee is a Los Angeles-based writer and teacher. Abee is known for writing poetry, short stories, and novels. He often draws on Los Angeles culture for his imagery and inspiration.

== Writing style ==
Abee is known predominantly as a Los Angeles writer. His poetry is known for its sense of place, focusing on the day-to-day of Southern California life. In a review of Abee's volume of poetry King Planet, Salon wrote that "Abee chronicles the pavement and hills of Southern California." His writing style has been characterized as "neo-beat," with accessible, everyday language.

Abee's novel, Johnny Future, received mixed reviews. The book follows the adventures of its Nyquil-guzzling, hallucinating, titular character, Johnny Future. MostlyFiction described the character as a mix between Holden Caulfield and Huckleberry Finn, and praised the character's uniqueness. Publishers Weekly, on the other hand, found that the main character lacked depth and was too bizarre to make the book enjoyable.

Abee began writing while working as an 18-year-old orderly at St. John's Hospital. He told the Los Angeles Times that experiences such as "pushing bodies down to the morgue" helped inspire him.

== Personal life ==
Abee was born at St. John's Hospital in Santa Monica, California. His maternal grandmother moved to Southern California in the 1940s, and Abee says his family has lived all around the Los Angeles area. Abee grew up in Southern California, but went to Santa Cruz for college, where he discovered that people disliked Los Angeles, he told KCET. This animosity toward his home deepened his affection for it.

Abee lives in Los Angeles with his wife and two daughters. He is a high school English teacher. In addition to teaching English, he mentors young aspiring poets.

== Notable works ==
- Johnny Future, 2012
- Great Balls of Flowers, 2009
- The Bus: Cosmic Ejaculations of the Daily Mind in Transit, 2001
- Jerusalem Donuts, Spoken Word CD, New Alliance Records, 1992
