= Zakłodzie, Lublin Voivodeship =

Zakłodzie
- Village
- Location within Poland
- Coordinates: 50°46′N 22°51′E
- Country: Poland
- Voivodeship: Lublin
- County: Zamość
- Gmina: Radecznica

Zakłodzie [zaˈkwɔd͡ʑɛ] is a village in the administrative district of Gmina Radecznica, within Zamość County, Lublin Voivodeship, in eastern Poland.

The Zakłodzie meteorite was found south (50°45′46″N 22°51′58″E) of Zakłodzie.
