= Palmer McAbee =

- Born: April 28, 1894; Cherokee County, Alabama, US
- Died: October 15, 1970 (aged 76) Cherokee County Hospital, Centre, Alabama, US
- Instrument: Harmonica
- Years active: 1928
- Label: Victor

Palmer Braden McAbee (April 28, 1894, in Cherokee County, Alabama – October 15, 1970, in Centre, Alabama) was an American blues harmonica player.

== Career ==
On February 21, 1928, he recorded two tracks in Atlanta, Georgia: "Lost Boy Blues" and "McAbee's Railroad Piece". They were released on a 10" 78rpm record, Victor 41930.

== Personal life ==
It has often been assumed from the style of his music that he was African-American. However, on his 1917 draft registration card, he is described as "Caucasian". At that time, he was employed as a carpenter, and resided in Cedartown, Georgia.

He is buried in Hebron United Methodist Church Cemetery, Howells Crossroads, Cherokee County.

Many harmonica players have tried to imitate railway noises. McAbee has been singled out for his "imagination and fervor ... creat[ing] effects both realistic and surrealistic sometimes by blowing over the top of the harp".
