= Larry McAfee =

American quadriplegic and disability rights activist

- Born: Larry James McAfee; November 18, 1955; Vinita, Oklahoma
- Died: October 1, 1995 (aged 39); Augusta, Georgia, U.S.
- Known for: Right to die advocacy

Larry McAfee (November 18, 1955 – October 1, 1995) was an American figure in the right to die and disability rights movements. A C1 quadriplegic, he successfully sued the State of Georgia for the right to disconnect his ventilator, but chose to remain alive after receiving further accommodations for his disability.

The 1993 film, The Switch, was based on McAfee's life and his relationship with Russ Fine, a radio talk show doctor who befriended him and became his spokesman.

== Early life ==
On May 1, 1985, electrical engineer Larry McAfee became completely paralyzed and ventilator dependent following a motorcycle crash. After he quickly exhausted his $1 million insurance deductible, he was shunted into a series of nursing homes for Medicare and Medicaid recipients unaccustomed to working with young, nonterminal patients. He devised a switch which would allow him to turn off his own ventilator, but found the process too painful to pursue unaided. Seeing no end to this existence, he petitioned the state for his right to die.

== Georgia v. McAfee ==
McAfee presented his case in August 1989. He asked for permission to turn off his ventilator, to receive analgesics to ease the dying process, and clemency for anyone who helped him achieve his goal. On November 21, 1989, the Supreme Court of Georgia ruled that he had "the right to refuse medical treatment in the absence of a conflicting state interest." After winning his case, however, McAfee was able to circumvent the bureaucracy that had forced him into the hospital, and he moved in an accessible housing unit with friends. He regained the will to live and died of natural causes in 1995.
