= Abée Castle =

Chateau in Liège Province, Belgium

- Château d'Abée (French)
- Tinlot, Wallonia, Belgium
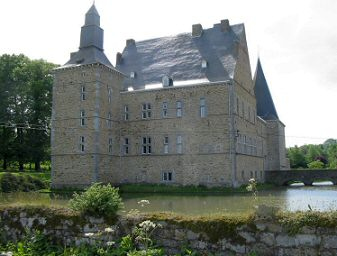

Site information
- Type: Castle
- Condition: Good

Location
- Coordinates: 50.476°N 5.352°E

Site history
- Built: 18th century

Abée Castle (French: Château d'Abée) is a fortified château in the municipality of Tinlot, Liège Province, Wallonia, Belgium. The present building dates from the 18th century, but incorporates parts of a medieval structure.

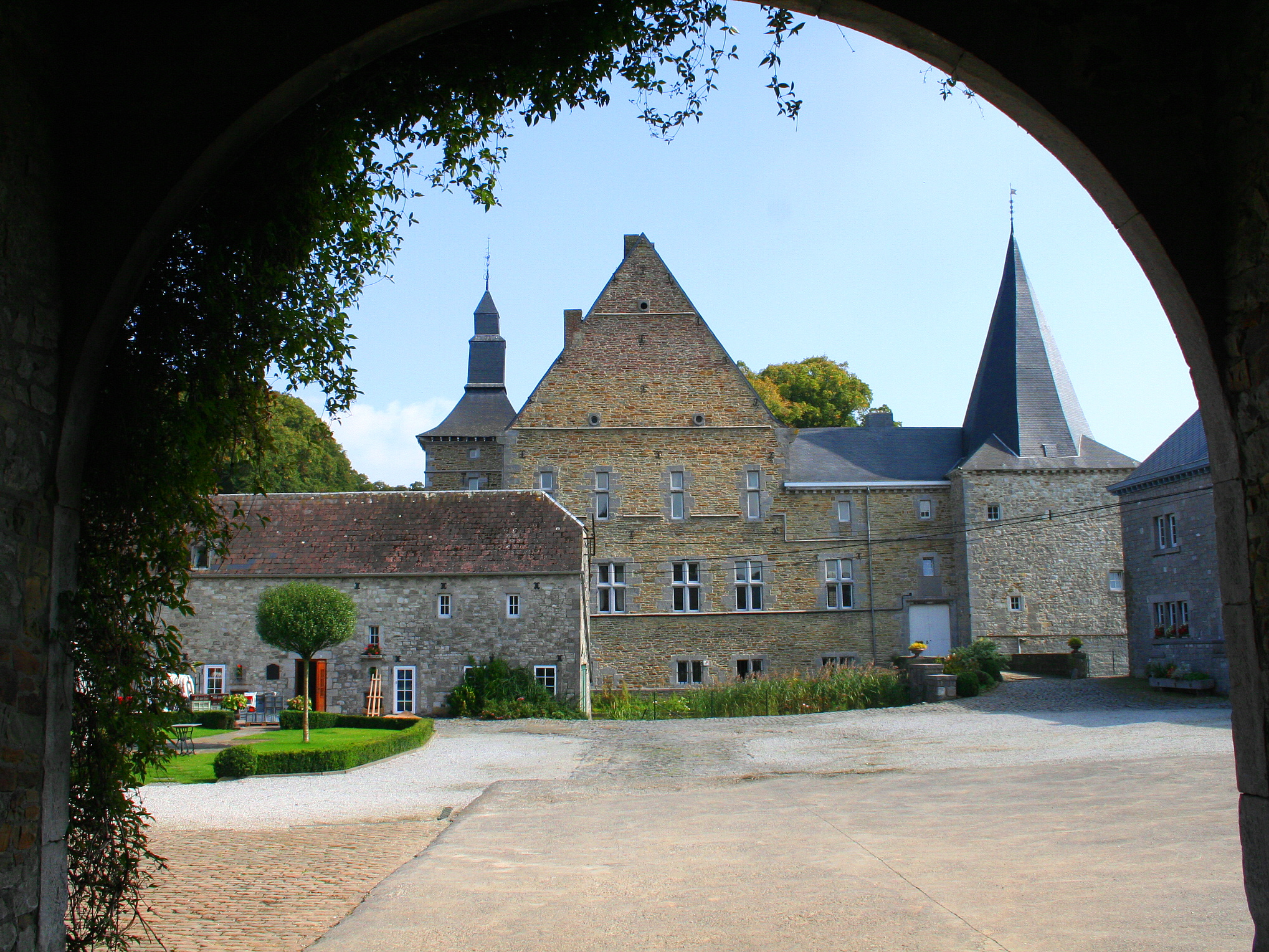

== Information ==
The castle belonged to the d'Abée family then to the Blehens family. In 1565, Jean de Blehen died without legitimate heirs and the ownership of the castle was given to Henri d'Eynatten, who was the Lord of Tinlot. The castle stayed in the family until the 18th century.

== See also ==
- List of castles in Belgium
- List of protected heritage sites in Tinlot
