= McAtee =

McAtee is an Irish surname. The name is an Anglicisation of the Gaelic Mac an tSaoi, meaning 'son of the scholar' or 'son of the wise man'.

Notable people with the name include:

- Allison McAtee (born 1985), American actress and fashion model
- Andrew McAtee (1888–1956), Scottish footballer (Celtic, New Bedford and Scotland)
- Bub McAtee (1845–1876), American baseball player
- Charles D. McAtee (1928–2005), Marine Corps officer, FBI agent, attorney and director of Kansas penal institutions during the last executions held in the state
- David McAtee (1966/67–2020), African American fatally shot by police in Louisville, Kentucky
- J. Linus McAtee (1898–1963), American jockey
- James McAtee (born 2002), English footballer
- John McAtee (born 1999), English footballer
- Jud McAtee (1920–2011), Canadian ice hockey player
- Norm McAtee (1921–2010), Canadian ice hockey player
- Rhodri McAtee (born 1984) Welsh rugby union player
- Waldo Lee McAtee (1883–1962), American ornithologist

== See also ==
- Bill Macatee
