= Abee (meteorite) =

Meteorite

Abee meteorite
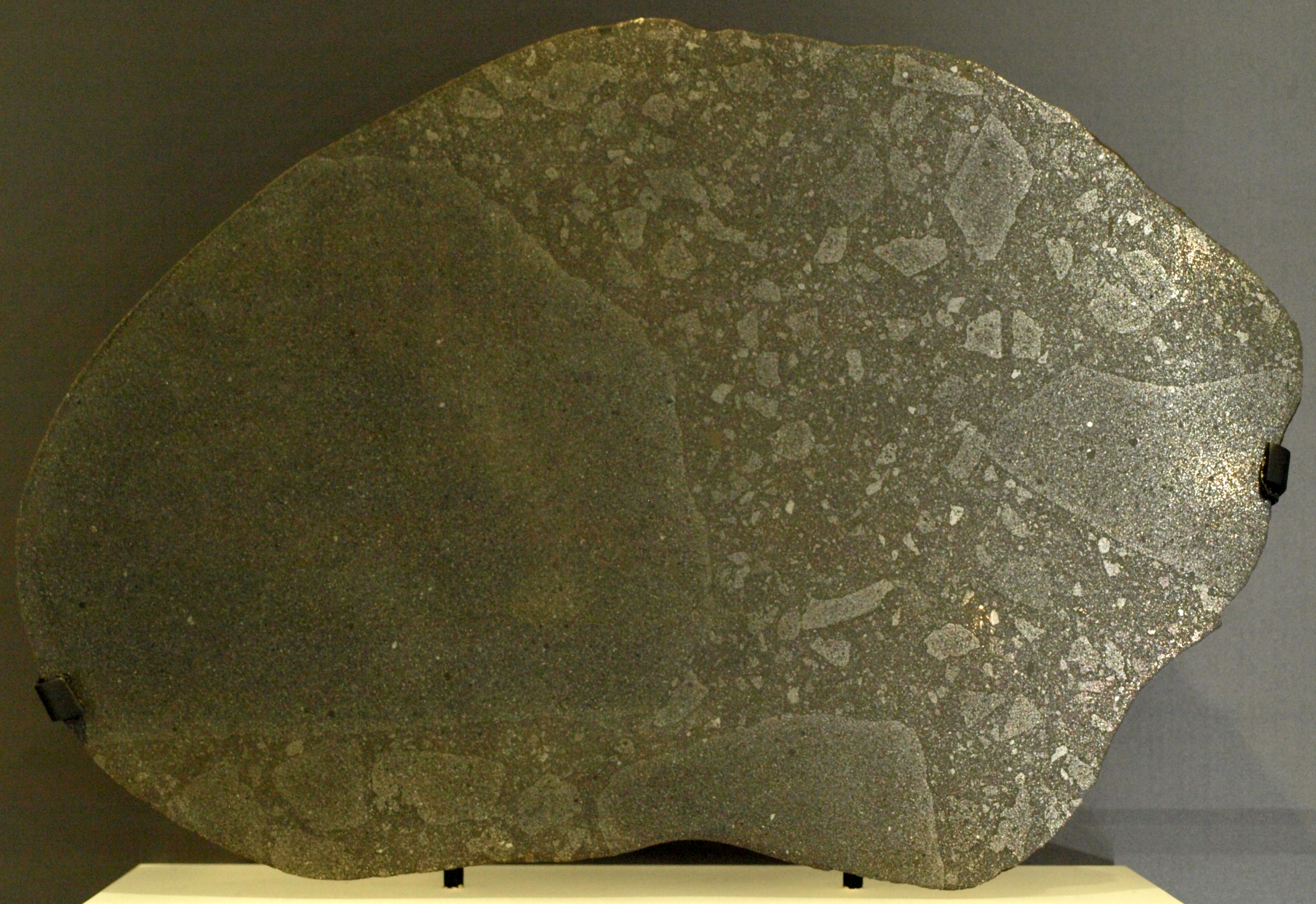
- Type: Chondrite
- Class: Enstatite chondrite
- Group: EH4
- Country: Canada
- Region: Alberta
- Coordinates: 54°14′19″N 113°01′20″W
- Observed fall: Yes
- Fall date: 9 June 1952
- Found date: 14 June 1952
- TKW: 107 kilograms (236 lb)
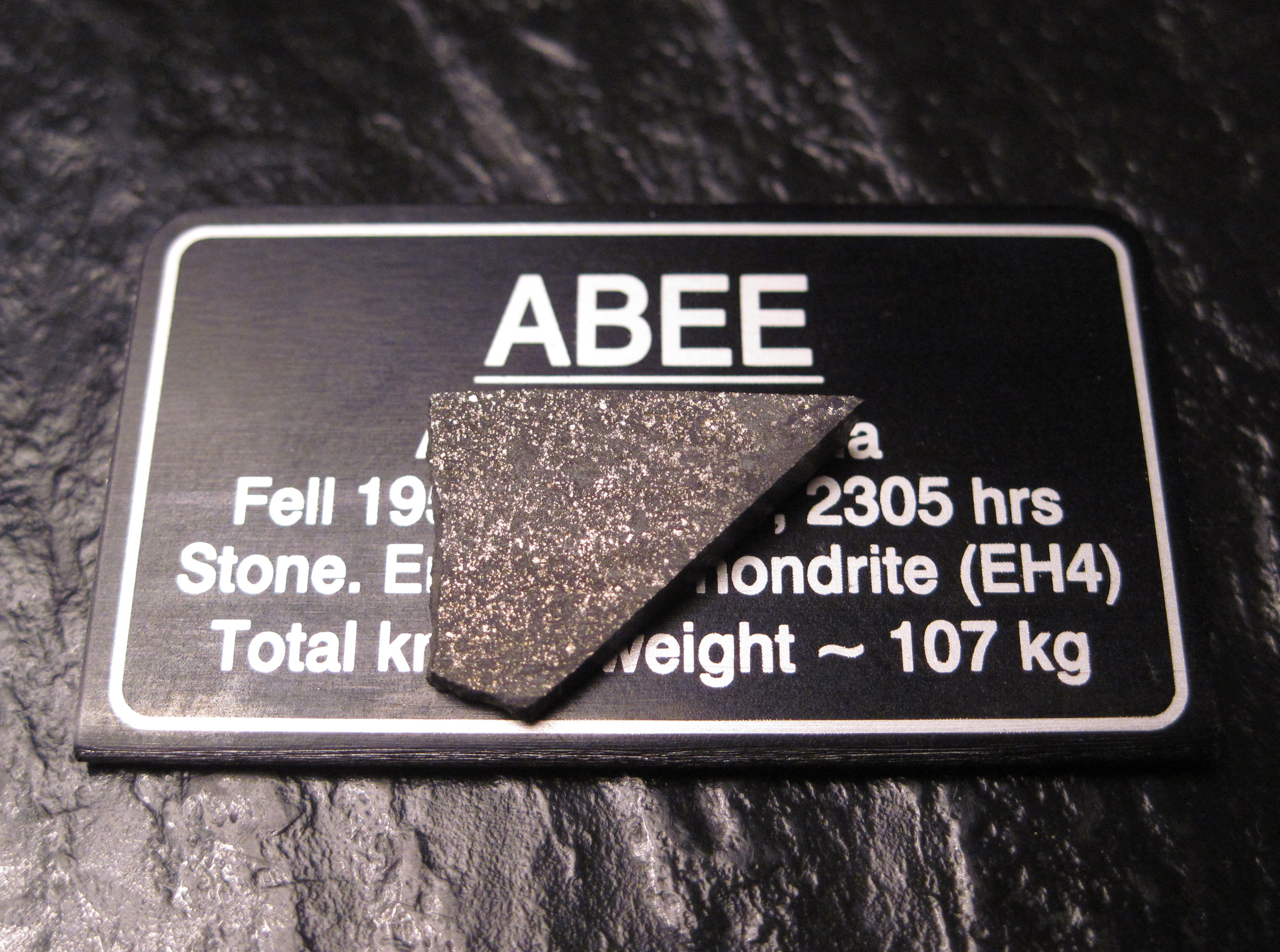
- Small 1.26 g slice.
- Related media on Wikimedia Commons

Abee is an enstatite chondrite meteorite that fell on 9 June 1952 in Alberta, Canada.

== History ==
The Abee meteorite fell at 11:05 p.m. on 9 June 1952. A stone of 107 kilograms (236 lb) was recovered from a 6 ft (1.8 m) deep crater.

It was found five days later in Harry Buryn's wheat field located in the community of Abee, Alberta, Canada; which is located in Thorhild County, along the Canadian National Railway and Highway 63, 16 kilometres (9.9 mi) north of Thorhild and 49 kilometres (30 mi) from Boyle.

== Classification ==
Abee is classified as an enstatite chondrite with a petrologic type 4, thus belonging to the group EH4. It is the only example in the world of an EH4 impact-melt breccia meteorite.

== See also ==
- Glossary of meteoritics
- Meteorite fall
