= Olmiite =

Calcium manganese silicate mineral

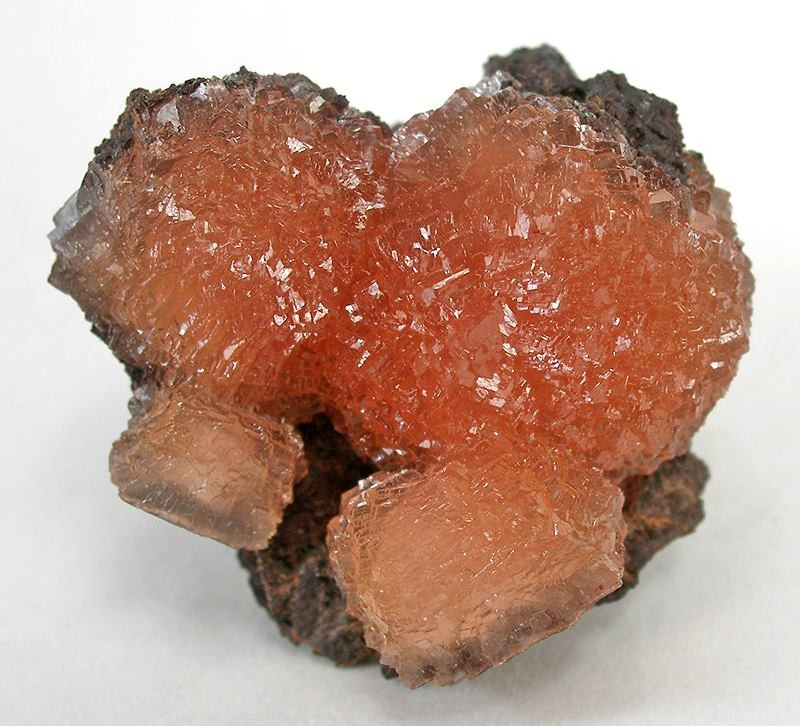

General
- Category: Minerals
- Formula: CaMn^{2+}[SiO_{3}(OH)](OH)
- IMA symbol: Olm
- Strunz classification: 09.AF.90
- Dana classification: 78.01.08.02
- Crystal system: Orthorhombic
- Crystal class: Dipyramidal; H-M symbol: mmm (2/m 2/m 2/m)
- Space group: Pbca
- Unit cell: 868

Identification
- Formula mass: 203.44
- Color: White, brown, pale to intense reddish pink
- Cleavage: None
- Fracture: Irregular, uneven
- Tenacity: Brittle
- Mohs scale hardness: 5 - 5.5
- Luster: Vitreous
- Streak: White
- Diaphaneity: Transparent, translucent
- Specific gravity: 3.05
- Density: Measured: 3.05; Calculated: 3.102
- Optical properties: Biaxial (+)
- Refractive index: n_{α} = 1.663(1) n_{β} = 1.672(1) n_{γ} = 1.694(1)
- Birefringence: 0.031
- Pleochroism: Non-pleochroic
- 2V angle: Measured: 71° Calculated: 66°
- Dispersion: r > v Distinct
- Ultraviolet fluorescence: May be deep red fluorescent in shortwave ultraviolet light

Olmiite is a rare calcium-manganese silicate that was named after an Italian mineralogist called Filippo Olmi. It was approved by the IMA in 2006, with its first description published in 2007. Around 2001, a large amount of specimens believed to be poldervaartite was discovered at the N'Chwaning II mine, which is near the Wessels mine, where the latter was discovered. Only later were the researchers able to determine through their investigations that the two minerals are different, as they are visually indistinguishable. Until Renato Pagano acquired and examined the specimens, seemingly no specific investigation was carried out. Olmiite has been misidentified not only once, but twice. The cream-colored specimens were at first thought to be baryte by the mine geologist.

== Properties ==
Olmiite is the Mn^{2+} dominant analogue of poldervaartite. It typically has a pinkish core color, caused by manganese coloration, and it typically has a colorless outer rim. Olmiite shows a wide variety of crystal habits. It can crystallize in radiating spheres, meaning it grows into an orb-like shape, forming slender crystals which grow from a central point. It can grow as botryoidal, which are hemispherical masses; acicular, which is a needle-like crystal habit; in stacked crystal plates, and wheat sheaf crystal groups. It can also form individual pyramidal crystals, however, those are uncommon. The aggregates are made of minute crystals. Olmiite aggregates on the market typically reach a few centimeters, and an individual crystal can reach up to 7 mm. In nature, specimens can range from thumbnail- to museum-sized slabs covered in olmiite crystals. However, most of the minerals only occur as tiny grains in rocks, which have to be found using a microscope. Olmiite mainly consists of oxygen (39.32%), manganese (22.95%) and calcium (22.65%), but otherwise contains silicon (13.81%), and has a negligible amount of hydrogen (0.99%) and iron (0.27%) in its formula as well. It shows no signs of radioactivity.

== Identification ==
Olmiite forms a solid solution series with the much rarer mineral poldervaartite, meaning they have the same basic chemical formula, but there's an element substitution in one or more atomic sites. As mentioned before, the atomic arrangement of the two are similar, the only difference being is in the case of olmiite, all the Mn cations are ordered on the M2 site, while poldervaartite is Ca dominant at the M2 site, hence the poldervaartite name stays reserved. One would think that its type locality would help in the identification, however, they both can be found in the Wessels mine in South Africa.

A way to differentiate them is that olmiite shows more variety both in color, and in crystal habits. One way to identify it more easily is that the cream-colored olmiite specimens have a deep red fluorescence under shortwave UV light. However, without examining its chemical composition, it is near impossible to identify whether the specimen is an olmiite or a poldervaartite. Hence it must be tested by electron microprobe analysis, as they can only be differentiated by the percentage of calcium versus manganese they contain. Due to the similarities these minerals have, the discovery that most of the poldervaartites on the market are olmiites in fact is quite recent. National Gem Lab further argues that due to the mislabeling of olmiites, it is possible that there's no faceted poldervaartite gemstones in existence. Later analyses also revealed that the two minerals can be intimately intergrown and thus both can occur within one specimen.

== Occurrences and localities ==
Olmiite is a product of hydrothermal alteration. As such, it grows in manganese-rich hydrothermal replacement deposits. The crystals form by going through metamorphosis due to the hot hydrothermal fluids passing through a manganese deposit, adding silicon and calcium to the pre-existing elements. To this day, the only known locality of this mineral is in the Kalahari Manganese Field of South Africa. It has been found in both the Wessels Mine in Hotazel and in the N'Chwaning Mines in Kuruman within the Manganese Field's region. It is associated with calcite, manganite, bultfonteinite, oyelite, hematite, celestine, sturmanite, and poldervaartite, baryte, datolite, andradite, thaumasite, caryopilite and gageite. Not only is it a rare mineral, but rare as a gem as well, since most of the crystals are unsuitable for faceting. Due to its softness, it cannot be used in jewelries, so the faceted specimens are made for the collectors.
