= Oldhamite =

Rocksalt group, sulfide mineral

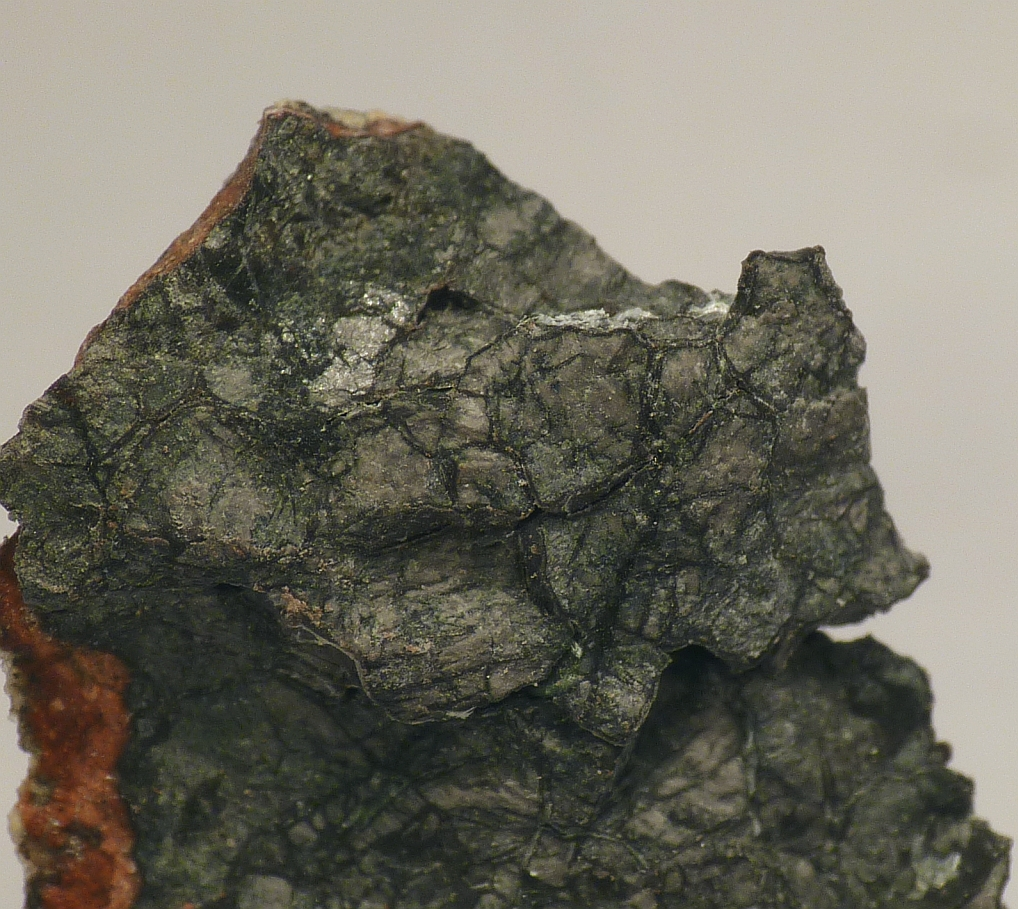
- Oldhamite (field of view: 1.5 cm)

General
- Category: Sulfide mineral
- Formula: (Ca,Mg)S
- IMA symbol: Old
- Strunz classification: 2.CD.10
- Crystal system: Cubic
- Crystal class: Hexoctahedral (m3̅m); H-M symbol: (4/m 3̅ 2/m)
- Space group: Fm3̅m
- Unit cell: a = 5.69 Å; Z = 4

Identification
- Color: Pale chestnut-brown
- Crystal habit: Crystal nodules, anhedral grains
- Cleavage: Good on {001}
- Mohs scale hardness: 4
- Luster: Sub-metallic
- Diaphaneity: Transparent
- Specific gravity: 2.58
- Optical properties: Isotropic
- Refractive index: n = 2.137
- Fusibility: 2450 °C
- Alters to: Tarnishes on exposure to moist air

Oldhamite is a calcium magnesium sulfide mineral with the chemical formula (Ca,Mg)S. Ferrous iron may also be present in the mineral resulting in the chemical formula (Ca,Mg,Fe)S. It is a pale to dark brown accessory mineral in meteorites. It crystallizes in the cubic crystal system, but typically occurs as anhedral grains between other minerals.

== Discovery and occurrence ==
It was first described in 1862 for an occurrence in the Bustee meteorite, Gorakhpur, Uttar Pradesh, India. It was named for Irish geologist Thomas Oldham (1816–1878), the Director of the Indian Geological Survey.

It occurs as an interstitial mineral phase between silicate minerals in enstatite chondrite and achondrite meteorites. It occurs in association with enstatite, augite, niningerite, osbornite, troilite, gypsum and calcite. It has been reported from a variety of meteorite locations around the world including the Allan Hills 84001 meteorite of Antarctica. It has also been reported from a slag occurrence in France and a coal deposit in Poland.

== See also ==
- Glossary of meteoritics
