= Abee =

- Hamlet
- Location of Abee Abee (Canada)
- Coordinates: 54°14′16″N 113°01′40″W
- Country: Canada
- Province: Alberta
- Region: Central Alberta
- Census division: 13
- Municipal district: Thorhild County

Government
  - Type: Unincorporated
  - Governing body: Thorhild County Council

Population (2009)
  - Total: 27
- Time zone: UTC−06:00 (Alberta Time)
- Area codes: 780, 587, 825

Abee is a hamlet in Alberta, Canada within Thorhild County. It is located on the Canadian National Railway and Highway 63, approximately 16 kilometres (9.9 mi) northeast of Thorhild and 49 kilometres (30 mi) south of Boyle. It has an elevation of 665 metres (2,182 ft). Abee recorded 4th highest temperature in Alberta, reaching 42.8 °C, 109.0 °F, In July 11 2021

For its latitude at 54°N, and an altitude of 665 m, reaching 42.8 °C, 109.0 °F is virtually unheard of anywhere, for example, Unalaska, Alaska at the same latitude and near-sea level elevation, never reached 29°C or higher.

== History ==
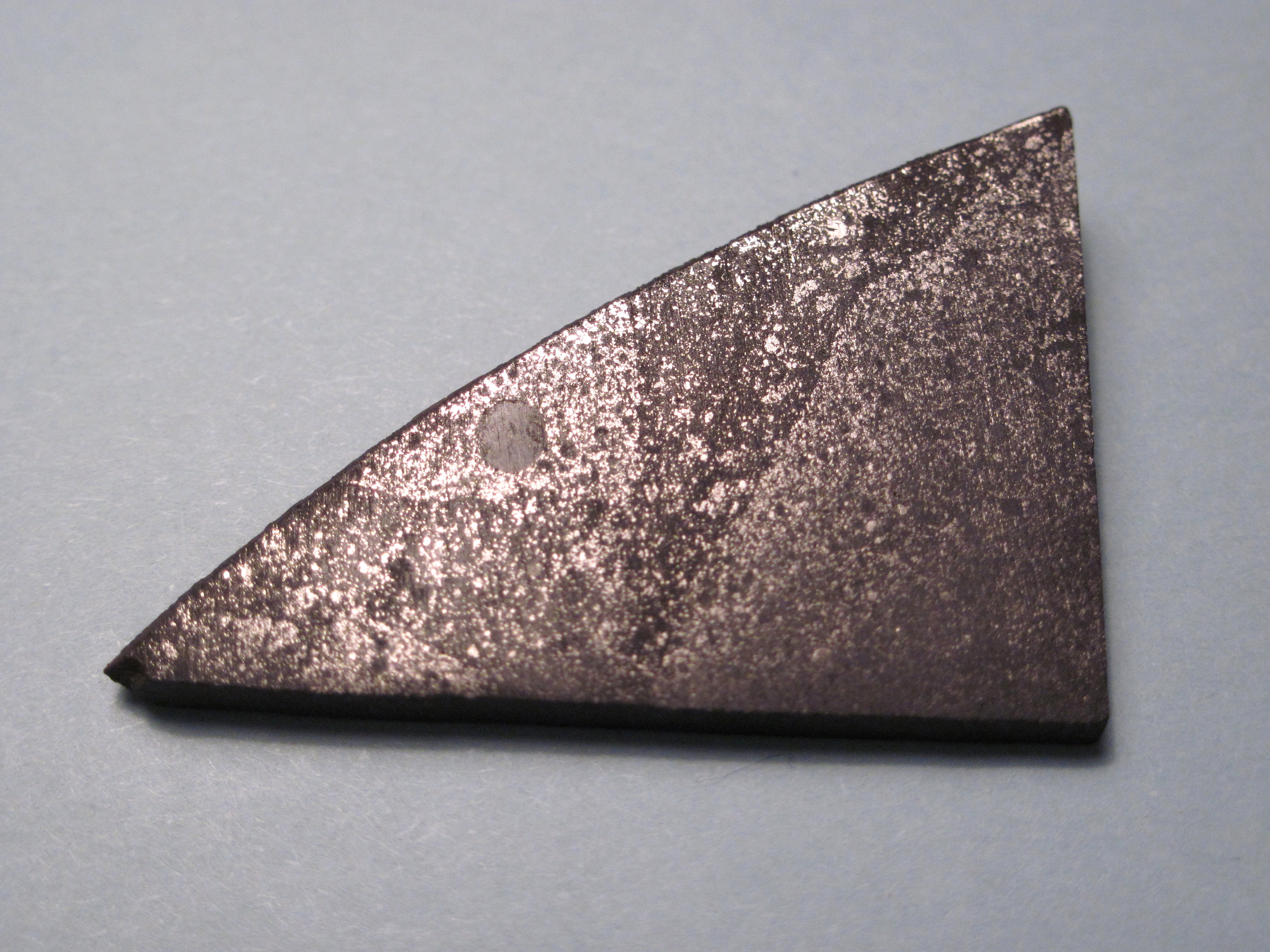
The only mass recovered from the Abee meteorite, a brecciated enstatite chondrite now on display at the American Museum of Natural History

The hamlet was named for A.B. Donley, lumber company manager. Harry Buryn found the Abee meteorite, which is only example in the world of an EH4 impact-melt breccia meteorite, in June 1952 in his wheat field.

== Demographics ==
The population of Abee according to the 2009 municipal census conducted by Thorhild County is 27.

== See also ==
- List of communities in Alberta
- List of hamlets in Alberta
