= Niningerite =

Sulfide

General
- Category: Sulfide minerals
- Formula: MgS
- IMA symbol: Nng
- Strunz classification: 2.CD.10
- Crystal system: Cubic
- Crystal class: Hexoctahedral (m3̅m); H-M symbol: (4/m 3̅ 2/m)
- Space group: Fm3̅m
- Unit cell: a = 5.2 Å; Z = 4

Identification
- Color: grey
- Mohs scale hardness: 3 1/2 – 4
- Luster: metallic
- Diaphaneity: opaque

Niningerite is a magnesium–iron–manganese sulfide mineral with the chemical formula MgS that is found in enstatite chondrite meteorites. Niningerite is the magnesium-dominant analog of keilite. This mineral is named after Harvey H. Nininger.

== See also ==
- Glossary of meteoritics
