= Cleland Boyd McAfee =

American theologian, minister and hymn writer

- Born: September 25, 1866; Ashley, Missouri, United States
- Died: February 4, 1944 (aged 77); Asheville, North Carolina
- Education: Park College; Union Theological Seminary
- Spouse: Harriet "Hattie" Lawson Brown (m. 1892)
- Children: Mildred Helen McAfee Horton, Ruth Myrtle and Katharine Agnes
- Parent(s): John Armstrong McAfee and Anna Waddell Bailey
- Church: Presbyterian
- Writings: The Greatest English Classic: A Study of the King James Version of the Bible
- Congregations served: First Presbyterian Church of Chicago, Illinois; Lafayette Avenue Church of Brooklyn, New York
- Offices held: Moderator, General Assembly of the Presbyterian Church in the United States of America; Director, Presbyterian Board of Foreign Missions

Cleland Boyd McAfee (September 25, 1866 – February 4, 1944) was an American theologian, Presbyterian minister and hymn writer, best known for penning the gospel hymn, "Near to the Heart of God," and its tune called "McAfee". He wrote the song after the concurrent deaths of two of his young nieces, caused by diphtheria. He also is believed to be the creator of the acronym TULIP, which represents the Five Points of Calvinism.

McAfee was born in Ashley, Missouri, in 1866, as one of five children. His father, John Armstrong McAfee, was the founder of Park College in Parkville, Missouri and its president from 1875 until his death in 1890. The son graduated from Park College in 1884, and later graduated from Union Theological Seminary in New York. McAfee went on to serve as a professor of philosophy, choir director, pastor and dean of Park College until 1901, when he left to minister at the First Presbyterian Church of Chicago. McAfee moved from First Presbyterian in 1904, to pastor the Lafayette Avenue Church of Brooklyn, in Brooklyn, New York. McAfee also taught systematic theology at McCormick Theological Seminary, from 1912 to 1930.

In 1912, McAfee authored the treatise, "The Greatest English Classic: A Study Of The King James Version Of The Bible." He was moderator of the General Assembly of Presbyterian Church in the United States of America, and led the Presbyterian Board of Foreign Missions from 1930 to 1936. He died in 1944.

On August 10, 1892, McAfee married Harriet "Hattie" Lawson Brown; they had three children, Ruth Myrtle, Katharine Agnes, and Mildred Helen.

Mildred Helen McAfee Horton went on to become president of Wellesley College (1936-1949) and the first director of WAVES (Women Accepted for Volunteer Emergency Service) in the United States Navy (1942–46).

Religious titles
Preceded by Rev. Hugh Kelso Walker	Moderator of the 141st General Assembly of the Presbyterian Church in the United States of America; 1929–1930	Succeeded by Rev. Hugh Thomson Kerr
