= Enstatite chondrite =

Rare type of meteorite

- — Class —
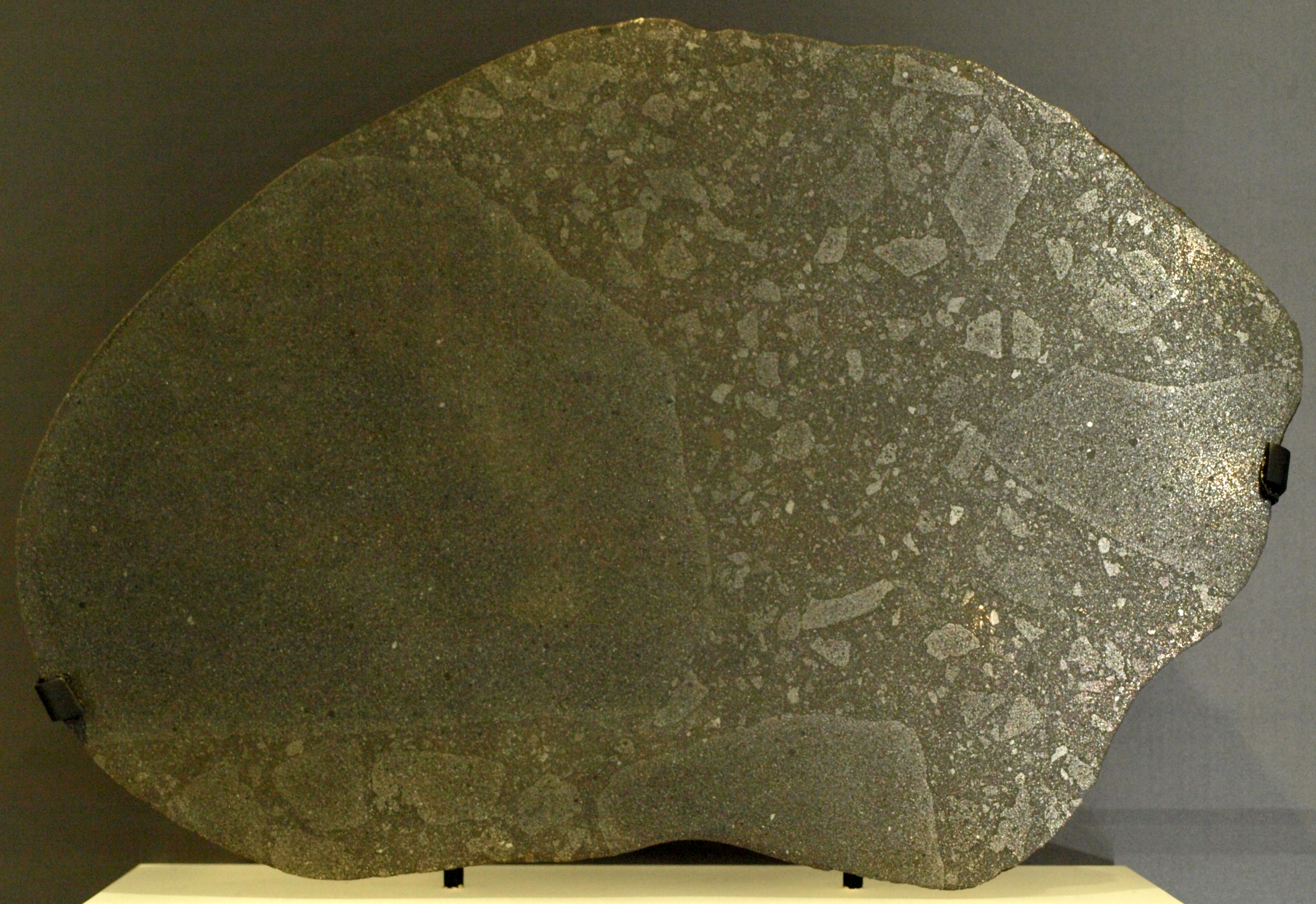
- Section of the Abee meteorite, an enstatite chondrite, on display at the Royal Ontario Museum
- Compositional type: Stony
- Type: Chondrite
- Total known specimens: ~200
- Alternative names: E-type chondrites

Enstatite chondrites (E-type chondrites) are a rare form of meteorite, rich in the mineral enstatite. Only about 200 E-Type chondrites are currently known, comprising about 2% of the chondrites that fall on Earth. There are two main subtypes: EH and EL, classified based on their iron content.

== Origin ==
E-type chondrites are among the most chemically reduced rocks known, with most of their iron taking the form of metal or sulfide rather than an oxide. They tend to be high in the mineral enstatite (MgSiO_{3}), from which they derive their name. Based on spectral analysis, it has been suggested that the asteroid 16 Psyche may be the common parent for this type of meteorite.

== Composition ==
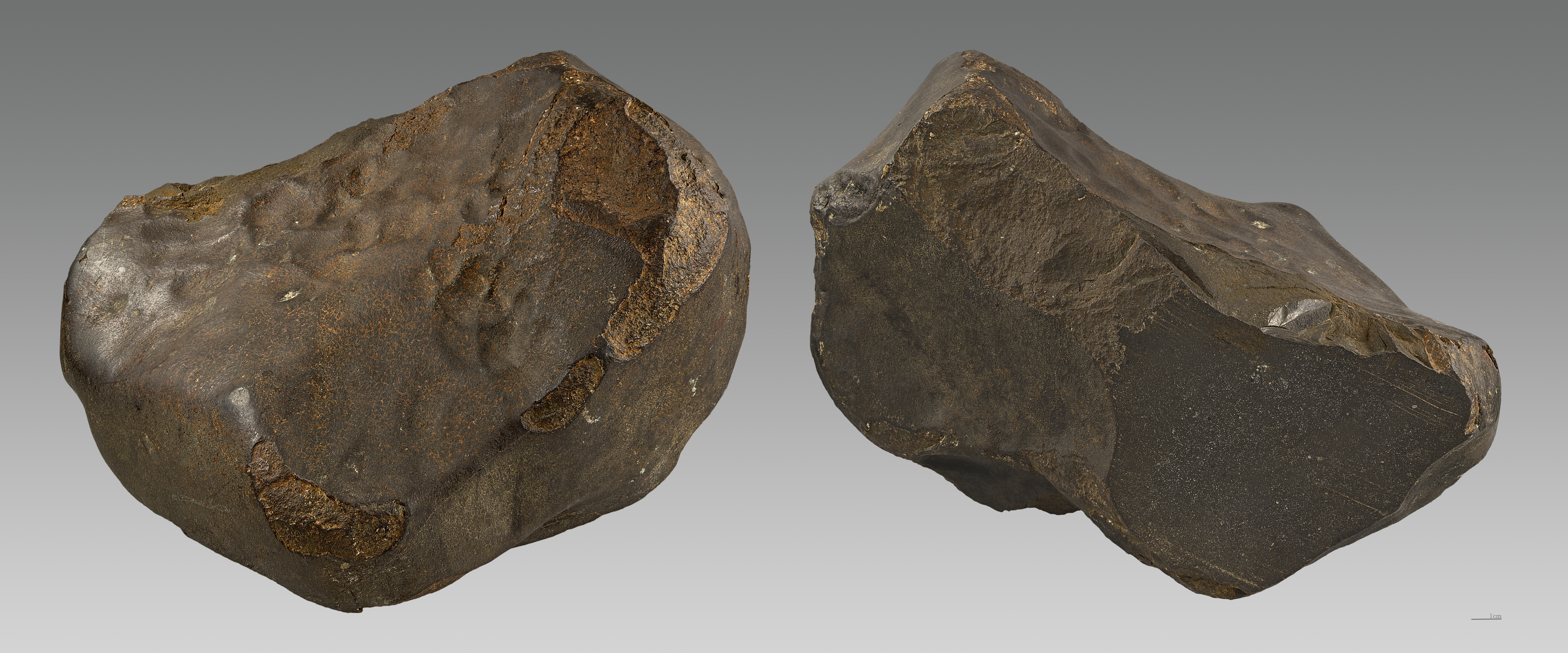
Saint-Sauveur meteorite, enstatite chondrite. Muséum de Toulouse.

Unlike most other chondrites, the minerals in enstatite chondrites contain almost no iron oxide; they are the most oxygen-poor silicate rocks known. They were supposed to be the driest objects in the Solar System but a recent study shows they contain sufficient hydrogen to have delivered to Earth at least three times the mass of water in its oceans. Metallic Fe-Ni (iron-nickel) and Fe-bearing sulfide minerals contain nearly all of the iron in this type of meteorite. Enstatite chondrites contain a variety of unusual minerals that can only form in extremely reducing conditions, including oldhamite (CaS), niningerite (MgS), perryite (Fe-Ni silicide), and alkali sulfides (e.g., djerfisherite and caswellsilverite). All enstatite chondrites are dominantly composed of enstatite-rich chondrules plus abundant grains of metal and sulfide minerals. Dusty matrix material is uncommon and refractory inclusions are very rare. Chemically, enstatite chondrites are very low in refractory lithophile elements. Their oxygen isotopic compositions are intermediate between ordinary and carbonaceous chondrites, and are similar to rocks found on the Earth and Moon. Their lack of oxygen content may mean that they were originally formed near the center of the solar nebula that created the Solar System, possibly within the orbit of Mercury. Most enstatite chondrites have experienced thermal metamorphism on the parent asteroids. They are divided into two groups:

- EH (high-iron) chondrites contain small chondrules (~0.2 millimetres (0.0079 in)) and high ratios of siderophile elements to silicon. Somewhat more than 10% of the rock is composed of metal grains. A diagnostic feature of EH chondrites is that the Fe-Ni metal contains ~3 wt% elemental silicon.
- EL (low-iron) chondrites contain larger chondrules (>0.5 millimetres (0.020 in)), and low ratios of siderophile elements to silicon. Fe-Ni metal contains ~1 wt% silicon.

== Superlatives ==
The largest known recorded E-type chondrite fall happened in the town of Abee, in Alberta in 1952. The 107 kilograms (236 lb) stone fell in a farmer's wheat field, creating an impact pit 0.7 m in diameter and 1.5 m deep. Based on estimates of its velocity and inclination, it is thought to have arrived at a relatively low-speed, low-inclination orbit that had a perihelion near 0.95 AU and an aphelion probably close to 2.74 AU. It is classified as being a shock-melted breccia, its minerals having recrystallized after the impact that knocked it off of its parent body. The meteorite was acquired by the Geological Survey of Canada, and a large sample of it is on display at the Royal Ontario Museum.

The largest known E-type chondrite in the asteroid belt may be 21 Lutetia, with a diameter of approximately 100 kilometres (62 mi), based on observations from the Rosetta spacecraft, ESO's New Technology Telescope, NASA Infrared Telescope Facility, and the Spitzer Space Telescope.

== See also ==
- Glossary of meteoritics
- Chondrite
- Meteorite
