= List of postal codes of Canada: T =

This is a list of postal codes in Canada where the first letter is T. Postal codes beginning with T are located within the Canadian province of Alberta. Only the first three characters are listed, corresponding to the Forward Sortation Area (FSA).

Canada Post provides a free postal code look-up tool on its website, via its applications for smartphones, and sells hard-copy directories and CD-ROMs. Many vendors also sell validation tools, which allow customers to properly match addresses and postal codes. Hard-copy directories can also be consulted in all post offices, and some libraries.

== Alberta ==
There are currently 157 FSAs in this list.

=== Urban ===
T1A; Medicine Hat; Central	T2A; Calgary (Penbrooke Meadows / Marlborough)	T3A; Calgary (Dalhousie / Edgemont / Hamptons / Hidden Valley)	T4A; Airdrie; East	T5A; Edmonton (West Clareview / East Londonderry)	T6A; Edmonton (North Capilano)	T7A; Drayton Valley	T8A; Sherwood Park; West	T9A; Wetaskiwin
T1B; Medicine Hat; South	T2B; Calgary (Forest Lawn / Dover / Erin Woods)	T3B; Calgary (Montgomery / Bowness / Silver Springs / Greenwood)	T4B; Airdrie; West	T5B; Edmonton (East North Central / West Beverly)	T6B; Edmonton (SE Capilano / West Southeast Industrial / East Bonnie Doon)	T7B; Not assigned	T8B; Sherwood Park; Outer Southwest	T9B; Not assigned
T1C; Medicine Hat; North	T2C; Calgary (Lynnwood Ridge / Ogden / Foothills Industrial / Great Plains)	T3C; Calgary (Rosscarrock / Westgate / Wildwood / Shaganappi / Sunalta)	T4C; Cochrane	T5C; Edmonton (Central Londonderry)	T6C; Edmonton (Central Bonnie Doon)	T7C; Not assigned	T8C; Sherwood Park; Inner Southwest	T9C; Vegreville
T1E; Not assigned	T2E; Calgary (Bridgeland / Greenview / Zoo / YYC)	T3E; Calgary (Lakeview / Glendale / Killarney / Glamorgan)	T4E; Red Deer County	T5E; Edmonton (West Londonderry / East Calder)	T6E; Edmonton (South Bonnie Doon / East University)	T7E; Edson	T8E; Sherwood Park; Central (Ardrossan)	T9E; Leduc (Includes YEG)
T1G; Taber	T2G; Calgary (Inglewood / Burnsland / Chinatown / East Victoria Park / Saddledome)	T3G; Calgary (Hawkwood / Arbour Lake / Citadel / Ranchlands / Royal Oak / Rocky Ridge)	T4G; Innisfail	T5G; Edmonton (North Central / Queen Mary Park / Blatchford)	T6G; Edmonton (West University / Strathcona Place)	T7G; Not assigned	T8G; Sherwood Park/ Ardrossan; East	T9G; Devon
T1H; Lethbridge; North	T2H; Calgary (Highfield / Burns Industrial)	T3H; Calgary (Discovery Ridge / Signal Hill / West Springs /Christie Park / Patterson / Cougar Ridge)	T4H; Olds	T5H; Edmonton (North and East Downtown Fringe)	T6H; Edmonton (Southgate / North Riverbend)	T7H; Not assigned	T8H; Sherwood Park; Northwest	T9H; Fort McMurray; Outer Central
T1J; Lethbridge; West and Central	T2J; Calgary (Queensland / Lake Bonavista / Willow Park / Acadia)	T3J; Calgary (Martindale / Taradale / Falconridge / Saddle Ridge)	T4J; Ponoka	T5J; Edmonton (North Downtown)	T6J; Edmonton (Kaskitayo / Aspen Gardens)	T7J; Not assigned	T8J; Not assigned	T9J; Fort McMurray; Inner Central
T1K; Lethbridge; West and South	T2K; Calgary (Thorncliffe / Tuxedo Park)	T3K; Calgary (Sandstone / MacEwan Glen / Beddington / Harvest Hills / Coventry Hills / Panorama Hills)	T4K; Stettler	T5K; Edmonton (South Downtown / South Downtown Fringe) Alberta Provincial Government	T6K; Edmonton (West Mill Woods)	T7K; Not assigned	T8K; Not assigned	T9K; Fort McMurray; Northwest
T1L; Banff	T2L; Calgary (Brentwood / Collingwood / Nose Hill)	T3L; Calgary (Tuscany / Scenic Acres)	T4L; Lacombe	T5L; Edmonton (North Westmount / West Calder / East Mistatim)	T6L; Edmonton (East Mill Woods)	T7L; Not assigned	T8L; Fort Saskatchewan	T9L; Not assigned
T1M; Coaldale	T2M; Calgary (Mount Pleasant / Capitol Hill / Banff Trail)	T3M; Calgary (Cranston / Auburn Bay / Mahogany)	T4M; Blackfalds	T5M; Edmonton (South Westmount / Groat Estate / East Northwest Industrial)	T6M; Edmonton; Southwest	T7M; Not assigned	T8M; Not assigned	T9M; Cold Lake
T1N; Not assigned	T2N; Calgary (Kensington / Westmont / Parkdale / University)	T3N; Calgary; Northeast	T4N; Red Deer; Central	T5N; Edmonton (Glenora / SW Downtown Fringe)	T6N; Edmonton (South Industrial)	T7N; Barrhead	T8N; St. Albert	T9N; Bonnyville
T1P; Strathmore	T2P; Calgary (City Centre / Calgary Tower)	T3P; Calgary (Symons Valley)	T4P; Red Deer; North	T5P; Edmonton (North Jasper Place)	T6P; Edmonton (East Southeast Industrial / South Clover Bar)	T7P; Westlock	T8P; Not assigned	T9P; Not assigned
T1R; Brooks	T2R; Calgary (Connaught / West Victoria Park)	T3R; Calgary; Northwest	T4R; Red Deer; South	T5R; Edmonton (Central Jasper Place / Buena Vista)	T6R; Edmonton (Riverbend)	T7R; Not assigned	T8R; Morinville	T9R; Not assigned
T1S; Okotoks	T2S; Calgary (Elbow Park / Britannia / Parkhill / Mission)	T3S; Calgary; Southeast	T4S; Sylvan Lake	T5S; Edmonton (West Northwest Industrial / Winterburn)	T6S; Edmonton (North Clover Bar)	T7S; Whitecourt	T8S; Peace River	T9S; Athabasca
T1T; Not assigned	T2T; Calgary; South (Altadore / Bankview / Richmond)	T3T; Tsuut'ina	T4T; Rocky Mountain House	T5T; Edmonton (West Jasper Place / West Edmonton Mall)	T6T; Edmonton (The Meadows)	T7T; Not assigned	T8T; Sturgeon County	T9T; Not assigned
T1V; High River	T2V; Calgary (Oakridge / Haysboro / Kingsland / Kelvin Grove / Windsor Park)	T3V; Not assigned	T4V; Camrose	T5V; Edmonton (Central Mistatim)	T6V; Edmonton (The Palisades / West Castle Downs)	T7V; Hinton	T8V; Grande Prairie; Central	T9V; Lloydminster
T1W; Canmore	T2W; Calgary (Braeside / Cedarbrae / Woodbine)	T3W; Not assigned	T4W; Not assigned	T5W; Edmonton (Central Beverly)	T6W; Edmonton (Heritage Valley)	T7W; Not assigned	T8W; Grande Prairie; South	T9W; Wainwright
T1X; Chestermere	T2X; Calgary (Midnapore / Sundance)	T3X; Not assigned	T4X; Beaumont	T5X; Edmonton (East Castle Downs)	T6X; Edmonton (Ellerslie)	T7X; Spruce Grove; North	T8X; Grande Prairie; East	T9X; Vermilion
T1Y; Calgary (Rundle / Whitehorn / Monterey Park)	T2Y; Calgary (Millrise / Somerset / Bridlewood / Evergreen)	T3Y; Not assigned	T4Y; Not assigned	T5Y; Edmonton (Horse Hill / East Lake District)	T6Y; Edmonton (Southeast Edmonton)	T7Y; Spruce Grove; Parkland County; Carvel; Lac Ste. Anne County	T8Y; Not assigned	T9Y; Not assigned
T1Z; Rocky View	T2Z; Calgary (Douglas Glen / McKenzie Lake / Copperfield / East Shepard)	T3Z; Redwood Meadows	T4Z; Not assigned	T5Z; Edmonton (West Lake District)	T6Z; Not assigned	T7Z; Stony Plain	T8Z; Not assigned	T9Z; Not assigned

=== Rural ===
T0A

0A0: Abee
0B0: Ardmore
0C0: Ashmont
0E0: Atmore
0J0: Bellis
0K0: Bon Accord
0M0: Boyle
0N0: Boyne Lake
0P0: Breynat
0R0: Caslan
0T0: Cherry Grove
0Z0: Egremont
1A0: Elk Point
1B0: Ellscott
1C0: Kehewin
1E0: Foisy
1H0: Fort Kent
1M0: Frog Lake
1N0: Gibbons
1P0: Glendon
1R0: Goodfish Lake
1S0: Goodridge
1V0: Grassland
1X0: Heinsburg
1Z0: Hylo
2A0: Iron River
2B0: Kikino
2C0: Lac La Biche
2E0: La Corey
2G0: Lafond
2H0: Lancaster Park
2J0: Lindbergh
2K0: Mallaig
2L0: McRae
2N0: Namao
2P0: Newbrook
2R0: Opal
2T0: Plamondon
2V0: Radway
2W0: Redwater
2Y0: St. Brides
2Z0: St. Lina
3A0: St. Paul
3B0: St. Vincent
3C0: Smoky Lake
3E0: Spedden
3G0: Sputinow
3J0: Thorhild
3K0: Tulliby Lake
3L0: Vilna
3M0: Wandering River
3N0: Warspite
3P0: Waskatenau
3T0: Saddle Lake
3Z0: Lac La Biche
4A0: St. Paul

T0B

0A0: Alliance
0B0: Amisk
0C0: Andrew
0G0: Armena
0H0: Bashaw
0J0: Bawlf
0K0: Beauvallon
0L0: Blackfoot
0M0: Bodo
0P0: Brosseau
0R0: Bruce
0S0: Bruderheim
0T0: Cadogan
0V0: Chauvin
0W0: Chipman
0X0: Clandonald
0Z0: Czar
1A0: Daysland
1B0: Denwood
1C0: Derwent
1G0: Dewberry
1H0: Donalda
1J0: Edberg
1K0: Edgerton
1M0: Ferintosh
1N0: Forestburg
1R0: Galahad
1S0: Hairy Hill
1V0: Hardisty
1W0: Hay Lakes
1X0: Hayter
2A0: Heisler
2B0: Hilliard
2C0: Holden
2E0: Hughenden
2G0: Innisfree
2H0: Irma
2J0: Islay
2K0: Kelsey
2L0: Killam
2M0: Kingman
2N0: Kinsella
2P0: Kitscoty
2R0: Lamont
2S0: Lavoy
2V0: Lougheed
2W0: Mannville
2X0: Marwayne
2Y0: McLaughlin
2Z0: Meeting Creek
3A0: Metiskow
3B0: Minburn
3C0: Mirror
3H0: Mundare
3J0: Musidora
3K0: Myrnam
3L0: New Norway
3M0: New Sarepta
3P0: Ohaton
3R0: Paradise Valley
3S0: Provost
3T0: Ranfurly
3V0: Red Willow
3X0: Rivercourse
3Y0: Rosalind
3Z0: Round Hill
4A0: Ryley
4B0: St. Michael
4C0: Sedgewick
4E0: Star
4G0: Streamstown
4H0: Strome
4J0: Tofield
4K0: Two Hills
4N0: Viking
4R0: Willingdon
4S0: Wostok

T0C

0A0: Alder Flats
0B0: Alix
0C0: Alsike
0E0: Altario
0J0: Bentley
0L0: Bittern Lake
0M0: Bluffton
0N0: Botha
0P0: Breton
0R0: Brownfield
0S0: Buck Creek
0T0: Buck Lake
0V0: Calmar
0W0: Carnwood
0X0: Castor
0Y0: Clive
1A0: Compeer
1B0: Consort
1C0: Coronation
1G0: Erskine
1H0: Falun
1K0: Gadsby
1L0: Gwynne
1M0: Halkirk
1N0: Maskwacis
1R0: Kirriemuir
1W0: Lindale
1X0: Ma-Me-O Beach
1Z0: Millet
2A0: Monitor
2C0: Mulhurst Bay
2E0: Nevis
2J0: Rimbey
2K0: Rolly View
2L0: Stettler
2M0: Sunnybrook
2N0: Tees
2P0: Thorsby
2S0: Veteran
2T0: Warburg
2V0: Westerose
2X0: Winfield
3B0: Rochon Sands

T0E

0A0: Alberta Beach
0B0: Blue Ridge
0C0: Brule
0E0: Cadomin
0G0: Carrot Creek
0J0: Cherhill
0K0: Cynthia
0L0: Darwell
0N0: Duffield
0S0: Entwistle
0T0: Evansburg
0V0: Fallis
0W0: Gainford
0X0: Glenevis
0Y0: Grande Cache
1A0: Gunn
1E0: Jasper
1H0: Lake Isle
1K0: Lodgepole
1N0: Mayerthorpe
1S0: Niton Junction
1V0: Onoway
1W0: Peers
1X0: Robb
1Y0: Rochfort Bridge
1Z0: Rocky Rapids
2A0: Sangudo
2B0: Seba Beach
2H0: Tomahawk
2K0: Wabamun
2M0: Wildwood
2Y0: Kapasiwin

T0G

0A0: Alcomdale
0C0: Atikameg
0G0: Bloomsbury
0H0: Busby
0J0: Calahoo
0K0: Calling Lake
0L0: Camp Creek
0M0: Canyon Creek
0N0: Chisholm
0P0: Clyde
0R0: Colinton
0S0: Dapp
0V0: Driftpile
0W0: Enilda
0X0: Faust
0Y0: Fawcett
0Z0: Flatbush
1A0: Fort Assiniboine
1B0: Gift Lake
1C0: Grouard
1E0: High Prairie
1G0: Hondo
1H0: Jarvie
1J0: Joussard
1K0: Kinuso
1L0: Legal
1M0: Lone Pine
1R0: Neerlandia
1S0: Nestow
1T0: Perryvale
1W0: Pickardville
1X0: Red Earth Creek
1Y0: Rivière Qui Barre
1Z0: Rochester
2A0: Slave Lake
2B0: Smith
2C0: Swan Hills
2E0: Tawatinaw
2G0: Tiger Lily
2H0: Vega
2J0: Vimy
2K0: Wabasca
2M0: Widewater
2N0: Trout Lake
2S0: Slave Lake
2W0: Peerless Lake

T0H

0A0: Bay Tree
0B0: Bear Canyon
0C0: Beaverlodge
0E0: Berwyn
0G0: Bezanson
0H0: Blueberry Mountain
0J0: Bluesky
0K0: Bonanza
0L0: Brownvale
0N0: Cadotte Lake
0P0: Calais
0S0: Chateh
0T0: Cherry Point
0Y0: Crooked Creek
1A0: Deadwood
1B0: Debolt
1C0: Demmitt
1E0: Dixonville
1G0: Donnelly
1H0: Eaglesham
1J0: Elmworth
1K0: Eureka River
1L0: Fairview
1M0: Falher
1N0: Fort Vermilion
1P0: Fox Creek
1R0: Fox Lake
1S0: Girouxville
1T0: Goodfare
1V0: Gordondale
1W0: Grimshaw
1X0: Grovedale
1Y0: Guy
1Z0: High Level
2A0: Hines Creek
2B0: Hotchkiss
2C0: Hythe
2E0: Jean Côté
2G0: Keg River
2H0: La Crete
2J0: La Glace
2L0: McLennan
2M0: Manning
2N0: Marie Reine
2P0: Meander River
2R0: Nampa
2T0: North Star
2V0: Notikewin
2W0: Paddle Prairie
2Y0: Rainbow Lake
3A0: Rycroft
3B0: St. Isidore
3C0: Sexsmith
3E0: Silver Valley
3G0: Spirit River
3H0: Sunset House
3J0: Tangent
3M0: Valhalla Centre
3N0: Valleyview
3P0: Wanham
3R0: Watino
3S0: Wembley
3T0: Whitelaw
3V0: Woking
3W0: Worsley
3X0: John D'Or Prairie
3Y0: Cleardale
3Z0: Little Smoky
4A0: Buffalo Head Prairie
4C0: Gundy
4E0: Zama City
4G0: Garden River
4H0: La Crete
4J0: High Level

T0J

0A0: Acadia Valley
0B0: Bassano
0E0: Big Stone
0G0: Big Valley
0H0: Bindloss
0K0: Buffalo
0L0: Byemoor
0M0: Carseland
0N0: Cereal
0P0: Cessford
0R0: Chinook
0S0: Cluny
0T0: Craigmyle
0V0: Dalemead
0W0: Delia
0X0: Dorothy
0Y0: Drumheller
0Z0: Duchess
1B0: East Coulee
1C0: Elkwater
1E0: Empress
1G0: Endiang
1H0: Esther
1K0: Fenn
1L0: Finnegan
1M0: Gem
1N0: Gleichen
1P0: Hanna
1R0: Hilda
1S0: Hussar
1T0: Iddesleigh
1V0: Irvine
1W0: Jenner
1X0: Langdon
1Y0: Lyalta
2A0: Millicent
2B0: Morrin
2C0: Munson
2G0: New Brigden
2J0: Oyen
2K0: Patricia
2L0: Pollockville
2M0: Rainier
2N0: Ralston
2P0: Redcliff
2R0: Rockyford
2S0: Rolling Hills
2T0: Rosebud
2V0: Rosedale Station (Rosedale)
2W0: Rosemary
2X0: Rowley
2Y0: Rumsey
2Z0: Scandia
3B0: Schuler
3C0: Sedalia
3E0: Sibbald
3G0: Standard
3J0: Sunnynook
3K0: Tilley
3L0: Walsh
3M0: Wardlow
3P0: Youngstown
3R0: Drumheller
3W0: Siksika

T0K

0A0: Aden
0B0: Barnwell
0C0: Bellevue
0E0: Blairmore
0G0: Bow Island
0H0: Brocket
0J0: Burdett
0K0: Cardston
0M0: Coleman
0N0: Coutts
0P0: Cowley
0R0: Cranford
0S0: Del Bonita
0T0: Diamond City
0V0: Enchant
0W0: Etzikom
0X0: Foremost
0Z0: Grassy Lake
1B0: Hays
1C0: Hillcrest Mines
1E0: Hill Spring
1G0: Iron Springs
1H0: Lundbreck
1J0: Magrath
1K0: Maleb
1L0: Manyberries
1M0: Milk River
1N0: Mountain View
1P0: New Dayton
1R0: Onefour
1S0: Orion
1V0: Picture Butte
1W0: Pincher Creek
1X0: Purple Springs
1Y0: Aetna
1Z0: Seven Persons
2A0: Shaughnessy
2B0: Skiff
2C0: Spring Coulee
2E0: Stirling
2H0: Turin
2J0: Twin Butte
2K0: Vauxhall
2L0: Warner
2M0: Waterton Park
2N0: Welling
2P0: Wrentham
2R0: Glenwood
2S0: Raymond

T0L

0A0: Aldersyde
0B0: Arrowwood
0G0: Barons
0H0: Black Diamond
0J0: Blackie
0K0: Bragg Creek
0L0: Brant
0N0: Carmangay
0P0: Cayley
0R0: Champion
0T0: Claresholm
0V0: Coalhurst
0X0: De Winton
0Z0: Fort Macleod
1A0: Granum
1E0: Lake Louise
1G0: Lomond
1H0: Longview
1K0: Millarville
1L0: Milo
1M0: Monarch
1N0: Mînî Thnî
1P0: Mossleigh
1R0: Nanton
1S0: Nobleford
1V0: Parkland
1W0: Priddis
1Y0: Stand Off
1Z0: Stavely
2A0: Turner Valley
2B0: Vulcan
2C0: Exshaw
2H0: Kananaskis
2R0: Eden Valley

T0M

0A0: Acme
0C0: Alhambra
0G0: Beiseker
0H0: Benalto
0J0: Blackfalds
0K0: Bowden
0L0: Carbon
0M0: Caroline
0N0: Carstairs
0P0: Condor
0R0: Cremona
0S0: Crossfield
0T0: Delacour
0V0: Delburne
0W0: Didsbury
0X0: Eckville
0Y0: Elnora
0Z0: Huxley
1B0: Irricana
1C0: James River Bridge
1E0: Kathyrn
1G0: Keoma
1H0: Leslieville
1J0: Linden
1K0: Lousana
1L0: Madden
1M0: Markerville
1R0: Penhold
1V0: Spruce View
1W0: Stauffer
1X0: Sundre
1Y0: Swalwell
2A0: Three Hills
2B0: Torrington
2C0: Trochu
2E0: Water Valley
2G0: Wimborne
2H0: Nordegg
2N0: Three Hills

T0N
Not in use
T0P

1B0: Fort Chipewyan
1C0: Fort McKay
1G0: Chard
1H0: Conklin
1J0: Anzac

T0R
Not in use
T0S
Not in use
T0T
Not in use
T0V

1A0: Fitzgerald

T0W
Commercial returns
T0X
Not in use
T0Y
Not in use
T0Z
Not in use

== Most populated FSAs ==
1. T6W, 83,496
2. T0H, 81,424
3. T3K, 79,143
4. T3J, 78,834
5. T5T, 77,839

== Least populated FSAs ==
1. T6S, 23
2. T6N, 28
3. T5V, 146
4. T6Y, 232
5. T3S, 288
