= Red Deer Region =

- Land-use framework region
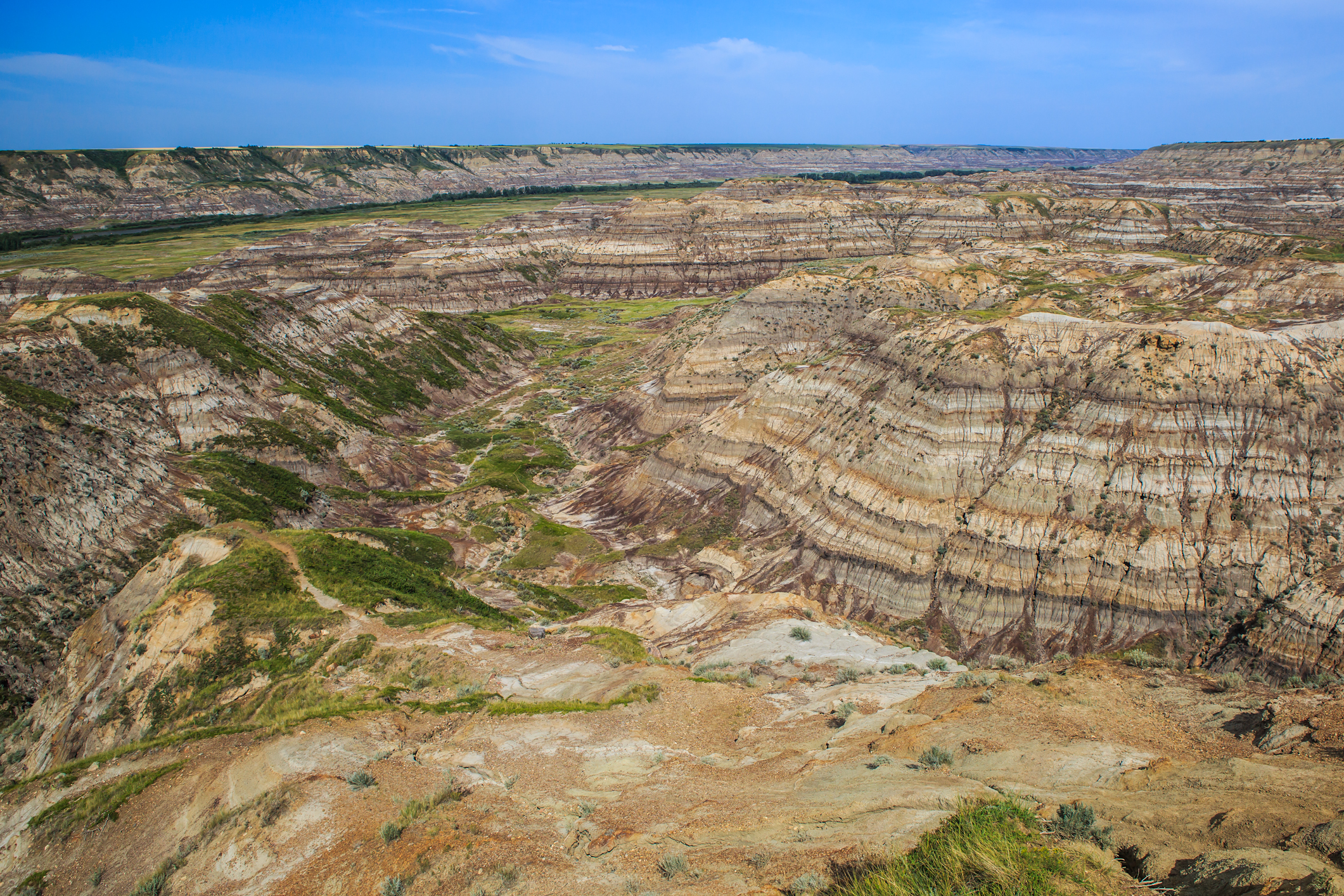
- Drumheller badlands

- Location in Alberta
- Largest population centres: Red Deer; Olds; Drumheller

Government
  - Parent authority: Alberta Environment and Parks

Area
  - Total: 50,338 km^{2} (19,436 sq mi)

Population (2016)
  - Total: 292,018
  - Density: 5.8011/km^{2} (15.025/sq mi)

The Red Deer Region is a land-use framework region in Alberta, Canada. One of seven in the province, each is intended to develop and implement a regional plan, complementing the planning efforts of member municipalities in order to coordinate future growth. Corresponding roughly to major watersheds while following municipal boundaries, these regions are managed by Alberta Environment and Parks.

== Communities ==
The following municipalities are contained in the Red Deer Region.

Cities

- Lacombe
- Red Deer

Towns

- Bentley
- Blackfalds
- Bowden
- Carstairs
- Castor
- Coronation
- Didsbury
- Drumheller
- Eckville
- Hanna
- Innisfail
- Olds
- Oyen
- Penhold
- Ponoka
- Rimbey
- Stettler
- Sundre
- Sylvan Lake
- Three Hills
- Trochu

Villages

- Acme
- Alix
- Big Valley
- Carbon
- Cereal
- Clive
- Consort
- Cremona
- Delburne
- Delia
- Donalda
- Elnora
- Empress
- Gadsby
- Halkirk
- Linden
- Morrin
- Munson
- Veteran
- Youngstown

Municipal districts

- Municipal District of Acadia
- Kneehill County
- Lacombe County
- Mountain View County
- County of Paintearth
- Ponoka County
- Red Deer County
- Starland County
- County of Stettler

Special areas

- Special Area No. 2
- Special Area No. 3
- Special Area No. 4

Indian reserves

- Ermineskin 138
- Montana 139
- Samson 137
