= Alberta Highway 12 =

Highway in Alberta

Highway 12

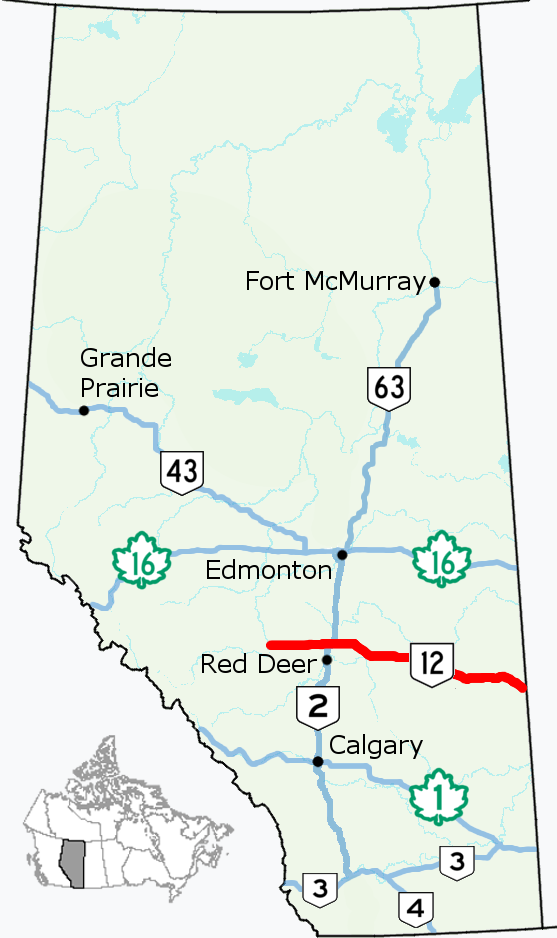

Route information
- Maintained by Alberta Transportation
- Length: 363.8 km (226.1 mi)

Major junctions
- West end: Highway 22 near Rocky Mountain House
- Highway 20 at Bentley; Highway 2 in Lacombe; Highway 21 near Alix; Highway 11 near Nevis; Highway 56 in Stettler; Highway 36 near Castor; Highway 41 from Consort to Monitor
- East end: Highway 51 at the Saskatchewan border near Compeer

Location
- Country: Canada
- Province: Alberta
- Specialized and rural municipalities: Clearwater County, Lacombe County, Stettler County, Paintearth County, Special Area No. 4
- Major cities: Lacombe
- Towns: Bentley, Stettler, Castor, Coronation
- Villages: Alix, Botha, Halkirk, Veteran, Consort

Highway system
- Alberta Numbered Highway Network; List; Former
← Highway 11A	→ Highway 13

Alberta Highway 12 is an east-west provincial highway in central Alberta. It runs 363.8 kilometres (226.1 mi) from Highway 22 near Rocky Mountain House in the west to the Alberta–Saskatchewan border near Compeer in the east, where it continues as Highway 51 into Saskatchewan. The highway passes through Lacombe and the towns of Stettler, Castor, and Coronation, running generally parallel to Highway 13 to the north.

== Route description ==
Highway 12 begins at Highway 22 approximately 10 kilometres north of Rocky Mountain House and runs east. It reaches Bentley, where it meets Highway 20. From there it skirts the south shore of Gull Lake before arriving at the interchange with Highway 2 (Queen Elizabeth II Highway) west of Lacombe. Within Lacombe the highway is designated 50 Avenue.

East of Lacombe, Highway 12 passes through Clive and then turns southeast near Tees. It passes through Alix and runs briefly concurrent with Highway 21 before turning east near Nevis, where it meets Highway 11. The route continues through Erskine and Stettler, where it crosses Highway 56.

East of Stettler the highway passes through Botha, Gadsby, and Halkirk before turning southeast again. It runs through Castor (intersecting Highway 36), Fleet, Coronation, Throne, and Veteran. Between Consort and Monitor the highway shares an 18-kilometre (11 mi) concurrency with Highway 41 (Buffalo Trail) before reaching the Saskatchewan border near Compeer.

== History ==
Originally, Highway 12 extended approximately 90 kilometres north of Bentley through Rimbey and Breton to Highway 39 near Alsike. In January 1988, that northern section was renumbered as Highway 20. At the same time, Highway 51, which had run west from Bentley and terminated at Highway 761 north of Leslieville, was redesignated as part of Highway 12, forming the new western segment of the route. In the 1990s, Highway 12 was extended further west to Highway 22.

== Construction and improvements ==
The interchange at Highway 2 and Highway 12 west of Lacombe uses a tight diamond configuration. Alberta Transportation recorded 83 collisions at the interchange between 2014 and 2018, with roughly 60 percent occurring on the southbound approach. A functional planning study presented to Lacombe city council on January 24, 2022, recommended replacing it with a diverging diamond interchange (DDI), a design that inverts traffic lanes on the bridge to reduce the number of conflict points. At the time of the presentation, only two DDIs existed in Canada: one south of Calgary, opened in 2017, and one in Saskatchewan, opened in 2018. The proposed upgrade would widen Highway 2 to six lanes in a first phase and eight lanes in a later phase and expand Highway 12 to six lanes. The full project carried an estimated cost of $107.5 million; provincial funding had not been committed as of the January 2022 presentation.

In 2022, Alberta Transportation built a roundabout at the Highway 12 and Highway 20 junction approximately one kilometre west of Bentley. The project included grade widening on both highways, curb and gutter installation with a concrete median, and new signage and markings. The intersection was designed with a central island apron and an outer truck over-run area to accommodate heavy vehicles and farm equipment.

In the 2020–2021 provincial capital budget, Alberta Transportation and the Town of Stettler funded a new Type IV intersection on Highway 12 at 80th Street on the west edge of town, intended to serve commercial development and a new seniors' housing project south of the highway. The initial project budget was $600,000. A scope change requiring the design speed to rise from 50 km/h to 70 km/h added approximately $200,000 to the cost and triggered re-tendering requirements under the New West Partnership Trade Agreement; seven companies had submitted bids on the original design, ranging from $576,000 to $937,000, before re-design.

== Major intersections ==
Starting from the western terminus:

Rural/specialized municipality	Location	km	mi	Destinations	Notes
Clearwater County		0.0	0.0	Highway 22 – Drayton Valley, Rocky Mountain House	Highway 12 western terminus; former Highway 51 western terminus
Clearwater County		22.7	14.1	Highway 761 – Leslieville	
Lacombe County		39.0	24.2	Highway 766 – Eckville	
Lacombe County	Bentley	58.6	36.4	Highway 20 – Rimbey, Sylvan Lake	Roundabout; former Highway 51 western terminus / Highway 20 northern terminus; Highway 12 formerly followed Highway 20 north
Lacombe County	Bentley	60.1	37.3	Highway 12A east	
Lacombe County	Gull Lake	68.6	42.6	Highway 12A west – Aspen Beach Provincial Park	
Lacombe County		70.4	43.7	Highway 792 north – Crestomere	
City of Lacombe		79.2	49.2	Highway 2 – Edmonton, Red Deer, Calgary	Interchange; Highway 2 exit 422
City of Lacombe		83.0	51.6	Highway 2A – Ponoka, Red Deer	
Lacombe County		96.4	59.9	Highway 815 – Joffre	
Lacombe County		102.1	63.4	UAR 111 north – Clive	
Lacombe County		110.4	68.6	UAR 88 north – Tees	
Lacombe County		111.0	69.0	Highway 821 north	
Lacombe County		111.4	69.2	Highway 50 east – Mirror	
Lacombe County	Alix	124.2	77.2	Highway 601	
Lacombe County		129.9	80.7	Highway 21 north – Mirror, Bashaw	West end of Highway 21 concurrency; unsigned Highway 921 south
Lacombe–Stettler County boundary		131.6	81.8	Highway 21 south – Three Hills	East end of Highway 21 concurrency
County of Stettler No. 6	Nevis	137.3	85.3		
County of Stettler No. 6		139.4	86.6	Highway 11 west – Red Deer	Former Highway 21A west
County of Stettler No. 6	Erskine	147.6	91.7	Highway 835 – Rochon Sands	
Stettler		159.3	99.0	Highway 56 – Camrose, Drumheller	
County of Stettler No. 6		169.9	105.6	Highway 850 north – Red Willow, Donalda	West end of Highway 850 concurrency
County of Stettler No. 6	Botha	173.3	107.7	Highway 850 south	East end of Highway 850 concurrency
County of Stettler No. 6	Gadsby	185.4	115.2	Highway 852 north	
County of Paintearth No. 18		198.4	123.3	Highway 855 north – Forestburg	West end of Highway 855 concurrency
County of Paintearth No. 18	Halkirk	200.3	124.5	Highway 855 south – Endiang	East end of Highway 855 concurrency
County of Paintearth No. 18	Castor	218.5	135.8	Highway 861 north	To Highway 599 east
County of Paintearth No. 18		222.9	138.5	Highway 36 – Viking, Hanna	
County of Paintearth No. 18	Coronation	253.1	157.3	Highway 872 south	West end of Highway 872 concurrency
County of Paintearth No. 18	Coronation	254.8	158.3	Highway 872 north – Brownfield	East end of Highway 872 concurrency
Special Area No. 4	Veteran	278.4	173.0	Highway 884 north	West end of Highway 884 concurrency
Special Area No. 4		280.0	174.0	Highway 884 south – Youngstown	East end of Highway 884 concurrency
Special Area No. 4	Consort	303.2	188.4	Highway 41 north – Wainwright; Highway 886 south – Cereal	West end of Highway 41 concurrency
Special Area No. 4	Monitor	320.5	199.1	Highway 41 south – Oyen	East end of Highway 41 concurrency
Special Area No. 4		349.5	217.2	Highway 899 – Altario, Provost	
Special Area No. 4	Compeer	363.8	226.1	Highway 51 east – Kerrobert	Highway 12 eastern terminus; continues into Saskatchewan
1.000 mi = 1.609 km; 1.000 km = 0.621 mi: Concurrency terminus; Route transition

== Highway 12A ==
Highway 12A
- Location: Bentley – Gull Lake
- Length: 9.1 km (5.7 mi)
- Existed: 2017–present

Alberta Highway 12A is a 9.1-kilometre (5.7 mi) alternate route along the south shore of Gull Lake. In 2012, Alberta Transportation began realigning Highway 12 to a new alignment approximately half a kilometre south of the original path, bypassing the town of Bentley, the summer village of Gull Lake, and Aspen Beach Provincial Park. The new alignment was officially designated Highway 12 in 2017; the former route became Highway 12A at the same time.

Aspen Beach Provincial Park sits on the southwest shore of Gull Lake adjacent to the Gull Lake hamlet. It was established in 1932 as the first provincial park in Alberta. Alberta did not gain control of its natural resources until the Natural Resources Transfer Acts of 1930; the Provincial Parks and Protected Areas Act, passed on March 21, 1930, provided the legal basis for a parks system. Aspen Beach opened two years after that act, originally covering just 17 acres. By 1939, Gull Lake had receded so far that the park pier stood on dry land, and provincial officials briefly considered leasing the site back to the village. The park expanded over subsequent decades; today it includes eight kilometres of trails and two seasonal campgrounds along the southwestern lakeshore.
