= Alberta Highway 51 =

Highway in Alberta, Canada

Route information
- Length: 36 km (22 mi)
- Existed: 1950s–January 1988

Major junctions
- West end: Highway 761 near Leslieville
- East end: Highway 12 / Highway 20 in Bentley

Location
- Country: Canada
- Province: Alberta
- Specialized and rural municipalities: Clearwater, Lacombe

Highway system
- Alberta Provincial Highway Network; List; Former
← Highway 50	→ Highway 52

Alberta Provincial Highway No. 51, commonly referred to as Highway 51, was a short east–west highway in central Alberta, Canada that existed between the 1950s and January 1988. It is now part of Highway 12.

== Route description ==
Highway 51 was a short highway that originated at the Highway 12 / Highway 20 intersection in Bentley and travelled west, running parallel to Highway 11. It was mostly gravel, ending at Highway 761 north of Leslieville.

== History ==
Highway 51 began appearing on maps in the 1950s and followed Township Road 404 west of Bentley. At the time, Highway 12 turned north at Bentley and continued towards Rimbey and Breton, while Highway 20 connected Bentley to Sylvan Lake. In January 1988, Highway 51 was renumbered to Highway 12, while the section of Highway 12 north of Bentley became part of Highway 20. In the 1990s, Highway 12 (formerly Highway 51) was extended west to Highway 22, 10 km (6 mi) north of Rocky Mountain House.
