= Alberta Highway 11 =

Highway in Alberta

Highway 11
- David Thompson Highway
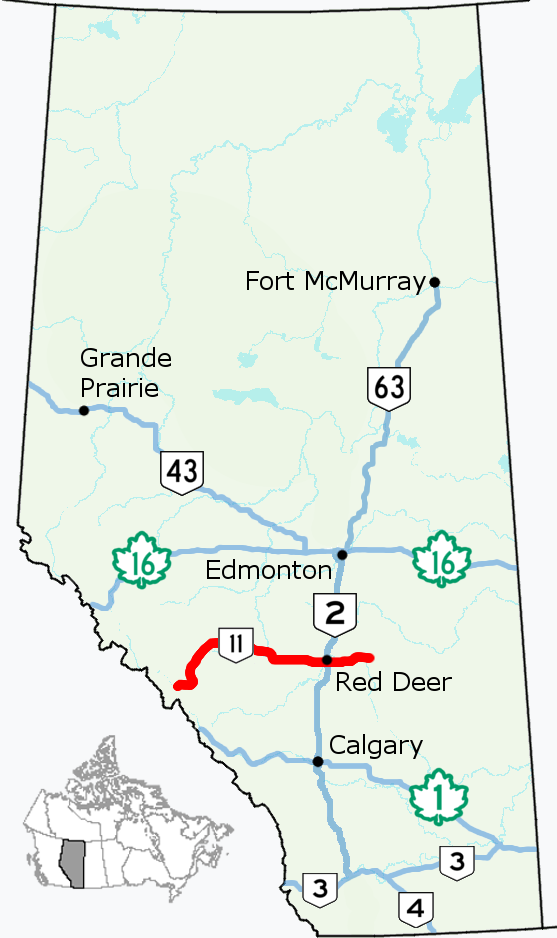
- Highway 11 highlighted in red

Route information
- Maintained by the Ministry of Transportation and Economic Corridors
- Length: 318.2 km (197.7 mi)

Major junctions
- West end: Highway 93 in Saskatchewan River Crossing
- Highway 11A in Rocky Mountain House; Highway 22 in Rocky Mountain House; Highway 20 near Sylvan Lake; Highway 2 in Red Deer; Highway 2A in Red Deer; Highway 21 near Nevis
- East end: Highway 12 near Nevis

Location
- Country: Canada
- Province: Alberta
- Specialized and rural municipalities: I.D. No. 9, Clearwater County, Lacombe County, Red Deer County, Stettler No. 6 County
- Major cities: Red Deer
- Towns: Rocky Mountain House, Sylvan Lake

Highway system
- Alberta Numbered Highway Network; List; Former
← Highway 10	→ Highway 11A

Alberta Provincial Highway No. 11, commonly referred to as Highway 11 and officially named the David Thompson Highway, is a provincial highway in central Alberta, Canada. It runs for 318 km (198 mi) from Highway 93 at Saskatchewan River Crossing near Mount Sarbach in Banff National Park east to Highway 12 near Nevis. It passes by Nordegg and through Rocky Mountain House, Sylvan Lake and Red Deer along its course. The highway is named after David Thompson, a British-Canadian fur trader, surveyor, and map-maker who explored the area between Rocky Mountain House and Kootenae House (near present-day Invermere, British Columbia) through Howse Pass.

== Route description ==
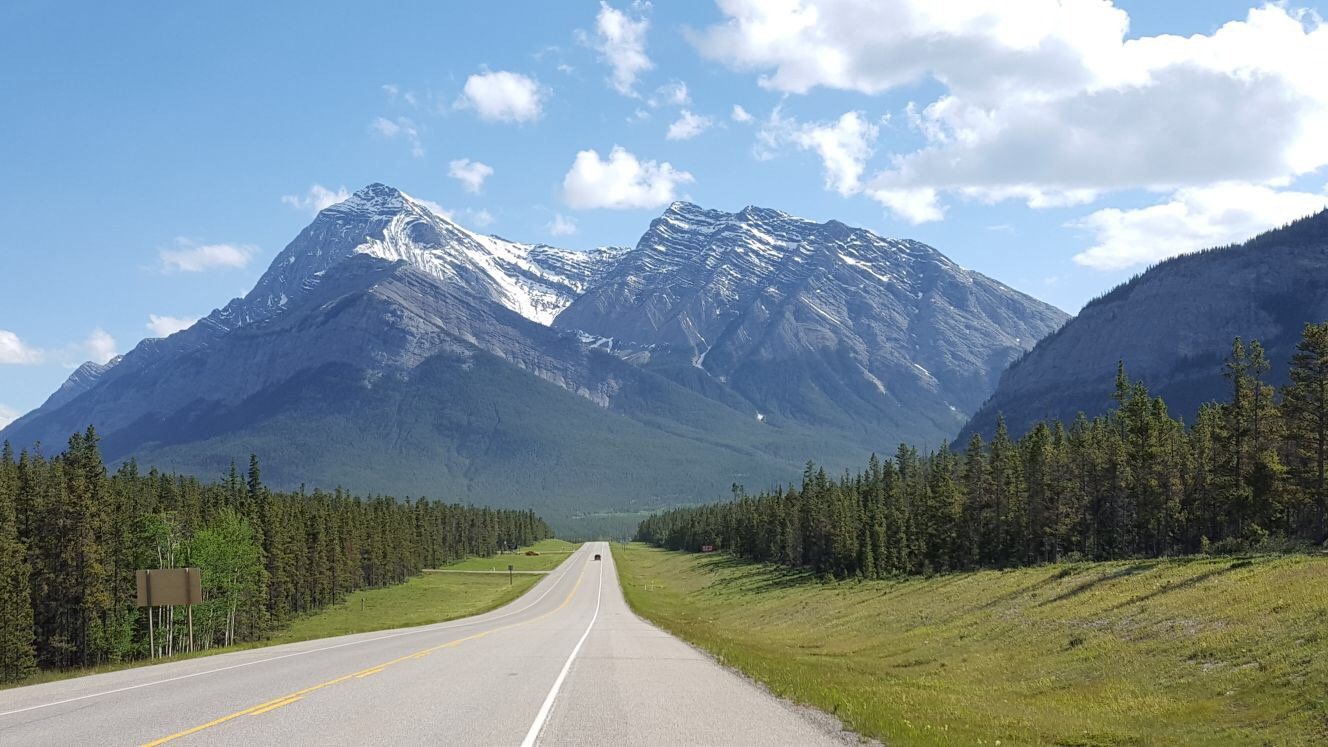
Highway 11 towards Banff in August 2017

The majority of Highway 11 is maintained by Alberta Transportation. The segment within Banff National Park is maintained by the Government of Canada, and within Red Deer limits the city has jurisdiction and is responsible for maintenance. It begins at the Icefields Parkway (Highway 93) and travels east for 6 km (3.7 mi) through Banff National Park, where traffic is required to purchase a national parks pass. Beyond Banff National Park, the highway parallels the North Saskatchewan River and traverses the sparsely populated Rocky Mountains Forest Reserve. It passes by the west shore of Abraham Lake, a reservoir created by the Bighorn Dam, and by Nordegg. The Brazeau Collieries mine at Nordegg began construction in 1911, became Alberta's most productive coal mine by 1923, and closed in January 1955; the minesite has been a designated Provincial Historic Resource since 1993. The highway continues east to Rocky Mountain House, where it is concurrent with Highway 22. Continuing east, the highway passes Alhambra, Condor, Eckville, and Benalto before bypassing Sylvan Lake and entering the City of Red Deer. The highway is a four-lane divided highway between Highway 20 and Red Deer, and crosses a causeway and bridge over Cygnet Lake. Highway 11 meets Highway 2 (Queen Elizabeth II Highway) at an interchange, entering Red Deer as 67 Street. It intersects Gaetz Avenue (Highway 2A) north of Downtown Red Deer near Parkland Mall, and crosses the Red Deer River before turning south and becoming 30 Avenue. At 55 Street, Highway 11 turns east and exits Red Deer, for a total length of 10 km (6.2 mi) within the city. The highway passes the Canyon Ski Area, crosses the Red Deer River and passes Joffre. East of Joffre, the highway follows the top of the Red Deer River valley and intersects Highway 21. Highway 11 ends at its intersection with Highway 12 near Nevis, 20 km (12 mi) west of Stettler.

== Future ==
=== Red Deer area ===
Traffic levels on Highway 11 have gradually increased west of Red Deer, resulting in multiple studies by Alberta Transportation for long-term planning of upgrades to the route. The studies call for the highway to be upgraded to a freeway standard in which all at-grade intersections would be removed between Highway 2 in Red Deer and the intersection at Highway 20 in Sylvan Lake. There is also a plan that calls for the permanent closure of the Highway 781/50 Street intersection, with Highway 781 being realigned to the Highway 20 intersection. There is also a study on twinning Highway 11 between Sylvan Lake and Highway 766 north near Eckville. Presently the improvements are unfunded. Red Deer is also constructing the North Highway Connector, also known as Northland Drive, which will serve as a northern bypass. The connector begins at the Highway 2A/11A intersection, crosses the Red Deer River, and connects with Highway 11 in eastern Red Deer. Phase I, currently under construction, connects with Highway 11 at the 30 Avenue / 67 Street intersection, while a proposed Phase II would connect with 20 Avenue approximately 1.6 km (0.99 mi) further to the east. Alberta Transportation also has right of way to realign Highway 11 east of Red Deer, bypassing its present 55 Street alignment; documentation temporarily refers to this alignment as Highway 11X.

=== Howse Pass ===
There have also been proposals to extend Highway 11 west of Highway 93 across Howse Pass and connect with British Columbia Highway 1 northwest of Golden, British Columbia, known as the 'Howse Pass Highway'. Proponents of the highway argue that it would provide an alternate route to British Columbia and would relieve congestion along the Trans-Canada Highway and the Yellowhead Highway. They also argue that it would reduce the distance between central Alberta and Vancouver by 95 km (59 mi), reduce the distance travelled through Banff National Park, and open up central Alberta to more economic opportunities. Opponents of the highway argue that it would cause significant environmental impact in an ecologically sensitive area, especially within Banff National Park which is a protected area. They also argue that it would be cost prohibitive constructing the British Columbia section of the highway along the Blaeberry River, especially since the Trans-Canada Highway and the Yellowhead Highway are requiring significant upgrades, and it is a low priority in British Columbia. Howse Pass is also designated as a National Historic Site which further protects the area from development and as a result it is unlikely that the highway will be constructed.

== Major intersections ==
From west to east:

Rural/specialized municipality	Location	km	mi	Destinations	Notes
Banff National Park (I.D. No. 9)	Saskatchewan River Crossing	0.0	0.0	Highway 93 (Icefields Parkway) – Jasper, Lake Louise, Banff	National park pass required; Highway 11 western terminus
Clearwater County		87.7	54.5	Highway 734 (Forestry Trunk Road) – Waiparous, Edson, Hinton	
Clearwater County	Nordegg	89.9	55.9		
Clearwater County		144.0	89.5	Sunchild Road	Access to Sunchild First Nation and O'Chiese First Nation
Clearwater County		168.7	104.8	Highway 11A east – Rocky Mountain House National Historic Site; Highway 756 north – Crimson Lake Provincial Park	
Clearwater County		172.5	107.2	Crosses the North Saskatchewan River	
Rocky Mountain House		174.2	108.2	Highway 22 north (Cowboy Trail) – Drayton Valley	West end of Highway 22 concurrency
Rocky Mountain House		177.7	110.4	Highway 11A west / Highway 598 east (52 Avenue) – Rocky Mountain House National Historic Site	
Clearwater County		181.1	112.5	Township Road 392 to Highway 752 south	
Clearwater County		186.1	115.6	Highway 22 south (Cowboy Trail) – Caroline, Sundre	East end of Highway 22 concurrency
Clearwater County		203.6– 203.9	126.5– 126.7	Highway 761 – Leslieville, Stauffer	Intersections are offset; Highway 761 concurrency for 300 m (980 ft)
Lacombe County		218.4	135.7	Highway 766 south	West end of Highway 766 concurrency
Lacombe County		219.9	136.6	Highway 766 north – Eckville	East end of Highway 766 concurrency
Red Deer County		225.7	140.2	UAR 164 south – Benalto	
Red Deer County		227.5	141.4	Township Road 390	Former Highway 11A east
Red Deer County	Sylvan Lake	237.2	147.4	Range Road 15 / 60 Street	Roundabout
Red Deer County	Sylvan Lake	238.8	148.4	Highway 781 south / 50 Street	Roundabout
Red Deer County	Sylvan Lake	240.4	149.4	Highway 20 north – Bentley, Rimbey	
Red Deer County		254.2	158.0	Burnt Lake Trail	Former Highway 596
City of Red Deer		255.0	158.4	Highway 2 – Edmonton, Calgary	Highway 2 exit 401; becomes 67 Street
City of Red Deer		256.6	159.4	Taylor Drive	
City of Red Deer		258.2	160.4	Gaetz Avenue (Highway 2A)	
City of Red Deer		259.3	161.1	Riverside Drive	Grade separated
City of Red Deer		259.4	161.2	Crosses the Red Deer River	
City of Red Deer		261.5	162.5	30 Avenue	Future connection to Highway 11A; Highway 11 follows 30 Avenue south
City of Red Deer		263.0	163.4	55 Street / 30 Avenue	Highway 11 follows 55 Street east
Red Deer County		274.3	170.4	Highway 808 south	
↑ / ↓		275.2	171.0	Crosses the Red Deer River	
Lacombe County		280.1	174.0	Highway 815 north – Joffre	
Lacombe County		299.4	186.0	Range Road 235 (Highway 921 south)	
Lacombe County		304.7	189.3	Highway 601 north – Alix	
Lacombe County		311.0	193.2	Range Road 223 (Highway 921 north)	
↑ / ↓		313.3	194.7	Highway 21 – Camrose, Three Hills	
County of Stettler No. 6		318.2	197.7	Highway 12 – Lacombe, Stettler	Highway 11 eastern terminus
1.000 mi = 1.609 km; 1.000 km = 0.621 mi: Concurrency terminus; Incomplete access; Tolled

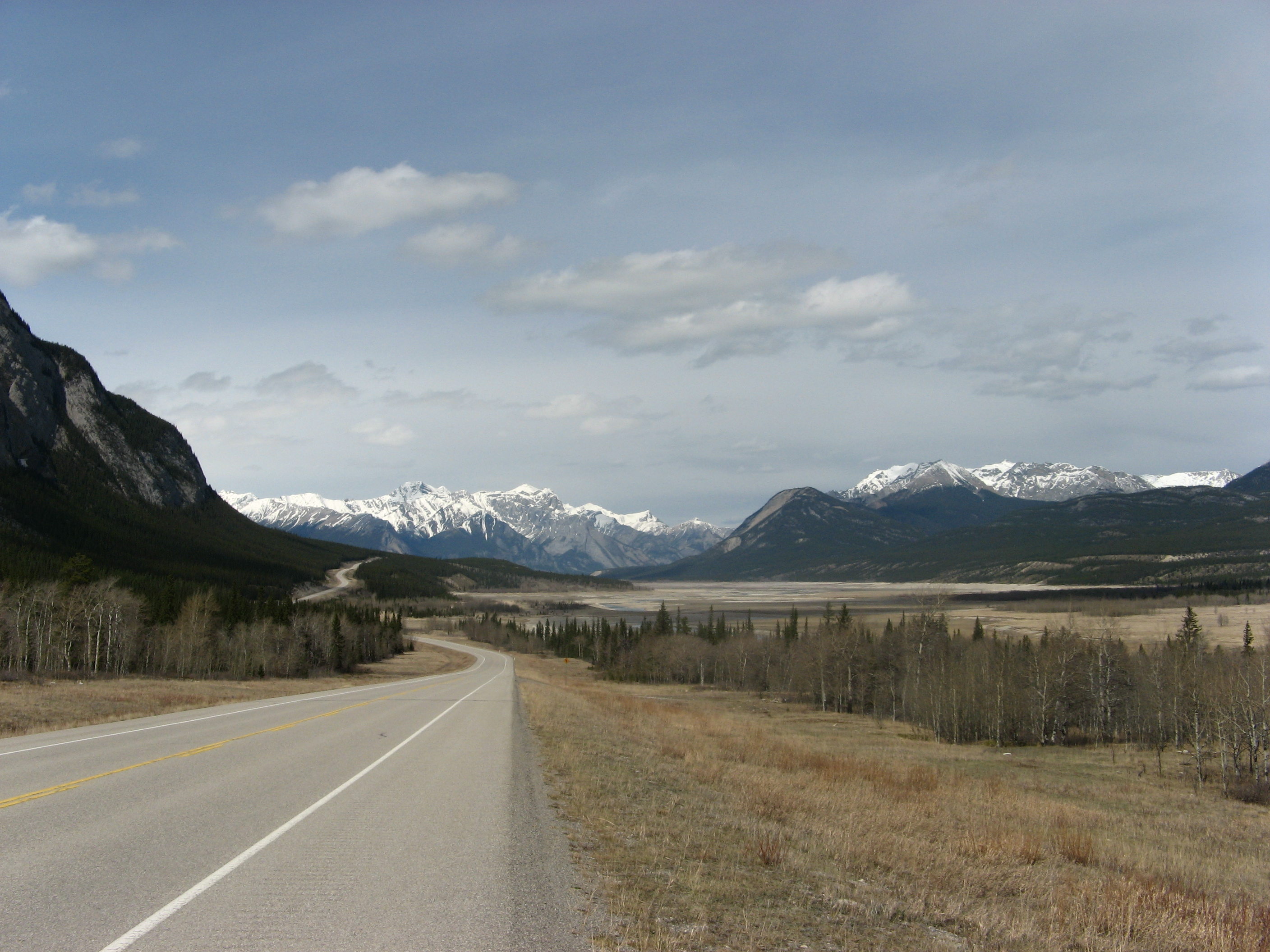
David Thompson Highway outside of Banff National Park

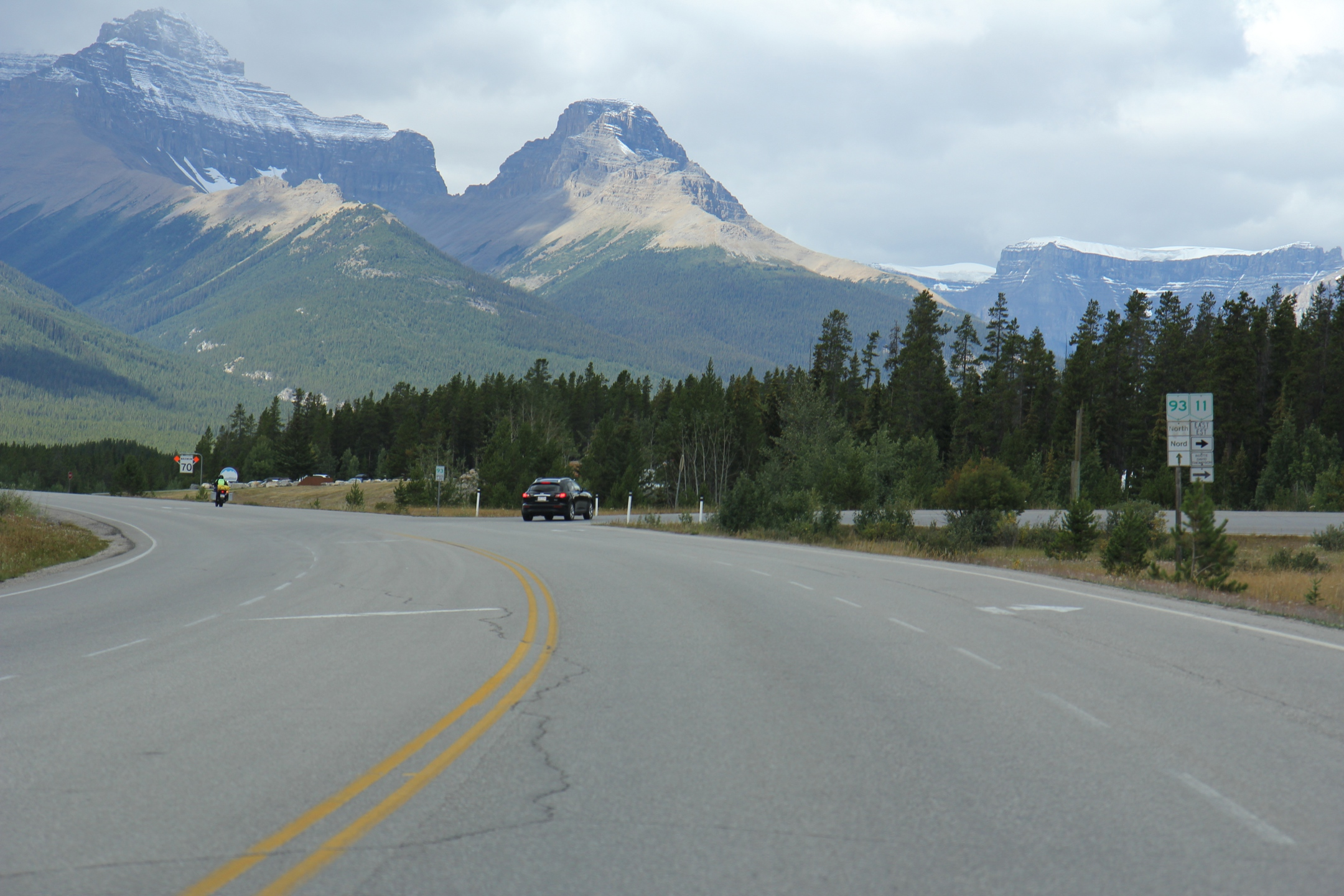
West terminus at Saskatchewan River Crossing
