= Gull Lake (Alberta) =

Lake in Lacombe County, Alberta, Canada

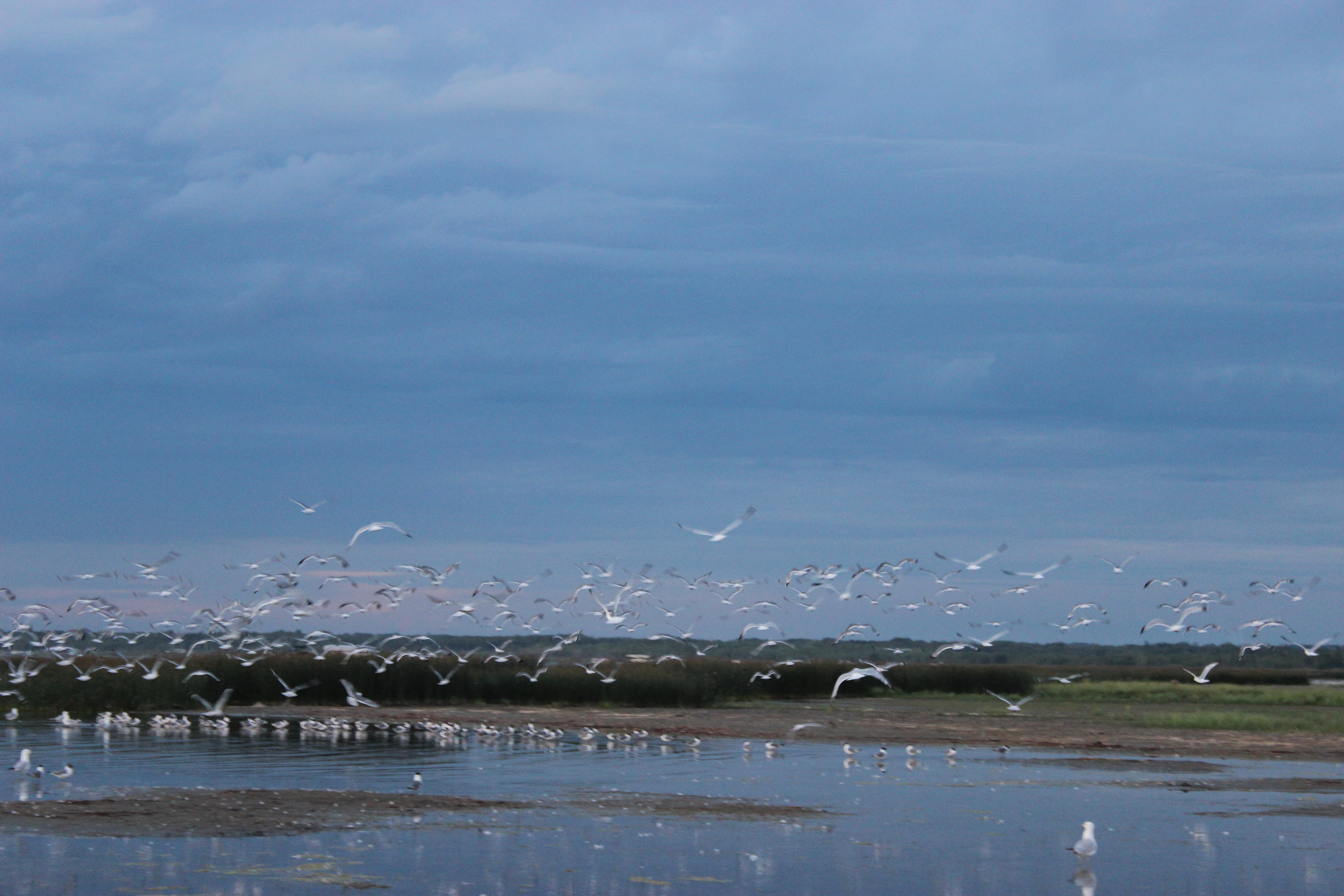
- Gulls of Gull Lake, Alberta

- Location within Alberta
- Location: Lacombe County / Ponoka County, Alberta
- Coordinates: 52°32′30″N 114°00′27″W
- Primary outflows: Blindman River
- Catchment area: 206 km^{2} (80 sq mi)
- Basin countries: Canada
- Surface area: 80.6 km^{2} (31.1 sq mi)
- Average depth: 5.4 m (18 ft)
- Max. depth: 8 m (26 ft)
- Residence time: >100 years
- Surface elevation: 899 m (2,949 ft)
- Settlements: Gull Lake

Gull Lake is a large lake in central Alberta, Canada. It is a popular recreational lake with its southern shores boasting large sandy beaches. Gull Lake is centrally located between Edmonton and Calgary and lies in two counties, Ponoka County and Lacombe County. The lake is accessed west of Ponoka on Highway 53 to get to the north side, or west of Lacombe on Highway 12 to reach the southern shores.

== Area covered ==
It has a total surface of 80.6 square kilometres (31.1 sq mi), and a maximum depth of 8 metres (26 ft). It has a catchment area of 206 km2 (79.5 sq mi). Several area streams including Birch Bay Creek and Wilson Creek flow into Gull Lake. Its waters drain through Outlet Creek into the Blindman River and then in the Red Deer River.

== Summer village ==
The summer village of Gull Lake is developed on the southern shore, adjacent to Aspen Beach Provincial Park, along Highway 12. Several campgrounds are located around the shores of the lake including Aspen Beach Brewers and Lakeview Provincial Park, Raymond Shores, and Degraffs Resort. Sylvan Lake is located 20 km (12 mi) south from Gull Lake. Gull Lake is a large, shallow lake located west of the City of Lacombe in the counties of Ponoka and Lacombe. Because it is situated between the cities of Edmonton and Calgary, Gull Lake is accessible to large numbers of people. Its clear water and sandy beaches contribute to its popularity, and the lake is heavily used on warm, sunny weekends. To reach the lake, take Highway 2 from Edmonton or Calgary to Lacombe, then turn west on Highway 12 and drive for 14 km to the summer village of Gull Lake (Fig. 1).

== First settlers ==
Homesteaders first settled the region south and west of Gull Lake in about 1895; many of these people came from the United States. By 1902, most of the land had been settled and a lumber industry had been established. A 26-m-long steamboat built in 1898 was used in a sawmill operation at Birch Bay on the northwest shore of Gull Lake (Coulton 1975). Passengers were often carried on this and other steamboats on the lake. By 1904, there was a second steamer and the area was already known as a summer resort.

== Hydroelectric reservoir ==
In 1908, Gull Lake served briefly as a hydroelectric reservoir when the Blindman River Electric Power Company Ltd. built a concrete dam on the outlet. Water from the lake was intended to supplement the flow of the Blindman River for power generation, but the dam was destroyed by dynamite in 1910. In ensuing years, the water level of the lake declined, and in 1921, the first formal complaint regarding the low water level was received by the Commissioner of Irrigation in Calgary. The same year, the summer village of Gull Lake built an earth and concrete dam at the outlet, which is now located about 1.6 km from the present shoreline (Bailey 1970).

== Lowered water level ==
Between 1924 and 1968, the water level in Gull Lake dropped an average of 6 cm per year, causing great concern among recreational users. In 1967, the Water Resources Division of Alberta Agriculture undertook a series of preliminary studies to try to solve the problem. In 1969 a Gull Lake Study Task Force, formed by personnel from various government agencies, was directed to investigate alternative proposals for stabilizing Gull Lake. Engineering, economic and land use studies were completed in 1970. The decision was made to divert water from the Blindman River through a pipeline and canal to supplement inflow. Pumping began in the spring of 1977, but at present, pumping occurs only when the lake level declines below a designated elevation (Richmond 1988). Pumping from the Blindman River ceased in 2018 with the discovery of invasive Prussian Carp in the river. A filtration system was devised, but funding has yet to be found to implement the system.

== Aspen Beach Provincial Park ==
Aspen Beach Provincial Park, established in 1932, was one of the first parks in the Alberta park system (Finlay and Finlay 1987). It is located on the southwest shore of Gull Lake. This park, with an area of 2.15 km2, has 2 campgrounds with 572 sites, a group camping area, a boat launch, beaches, day-use areas, flush toilets and showers. In addition, there are several campgrounds operated by private owners or nonprofit organizations around the lakeshore. Activities at the lake include sailing, power boating, swimming, fishing and windsurfing. In posted areas of the lake, either all boats are prohibited or power-driven boats are subject to a maximum speed of 12 km/hour (Alta. For. Ld. Wild. 1988).

== Fishing ==
Gull Lake is used moderately for sport fishing, but there is no commercial or domestic fishery. Northern pike and walleye are the most sought-after sport fish, although lake whitefish and Burbot are also present in the lake. Walleye have been stocked in Gull Lake in recent years. The diversion canal into the lake is closed to fishing year-round. There is also a sizable ice fishing culture in the winter.

In 1908, the lake stocked smallmouth bass in an effort to introduce sport-fishing species into Alberta lakes.
