= Aspen Beach Provincial Park =

Provincial park in Alberta, Canada

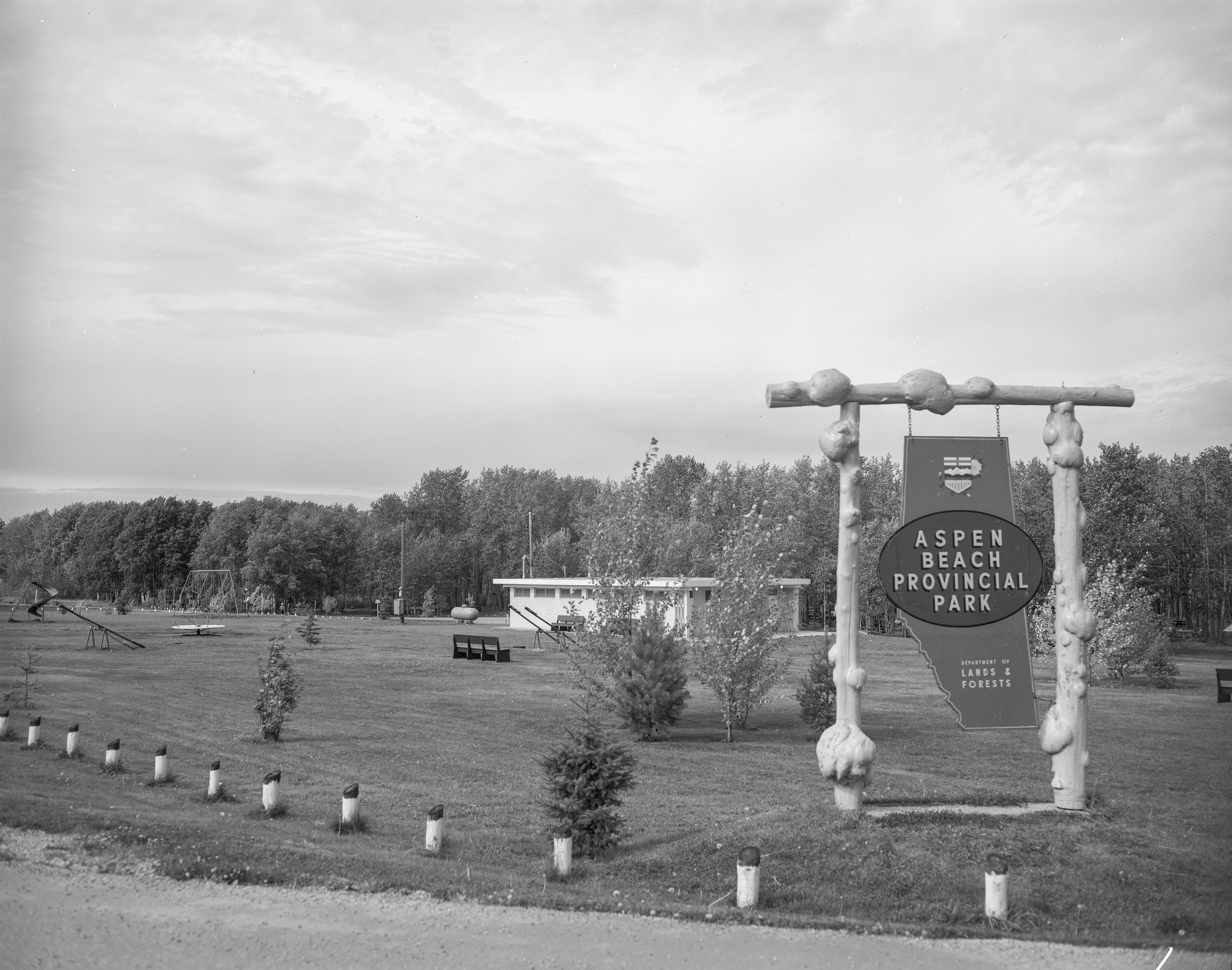
- Aspen Beach Provincial Park, 1966

- Location within Alberta
- Interactive map of Aspen Beach Provincial Park
- Location: Lacombe County, Alberta Canada
- Nearest city: Lacombe, Bentley
- Coordinates: 52°27′44″N 113°58′36″W
- Established: November 21, 1932
- Governing body: Alberta Tourism, Parks and Recreation

Aspen Beach Provincial Park is a provincial park in Alberta, Canada, located 17 km west of Lacombe on Highway 12, a short drive off Highway 2. The park has over 8 kilometres of trails, and is open year-round. The two campgrounds in the park are open from mid-May to September.

== History ==
Established in 1932, Aspen Beach Provincial Park was the first provincial park in Alberta. The parkland reserve and recreational area contains sand beaches on the southern shores of Gull Lake, which is suitable for swimming and paddling due to its warm shallow waters.

== See also ==
- List of Alberta provincial parks
- List of Canadian provincial parks
- List of National Parks of Canada
