= Alberta Highway 50 =

Highway in Alberta, Canada

Highway 50

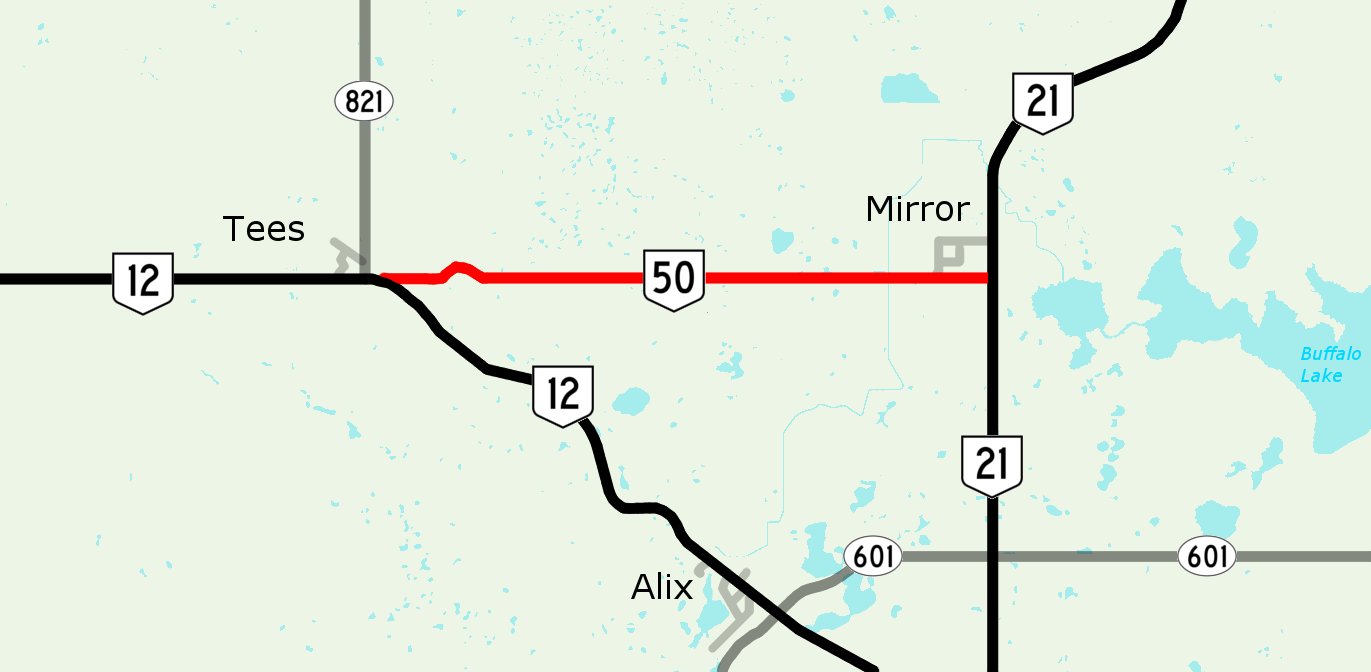

Route information
- Maintained by the Ministry of Transportation and Economic Corridors
- Length: 14.46 km (8.99 mi)

Major junctions
- West end: Highway 12 near Tees
- East end: Highway 21 near Mirror

Location
- Country: Canada
- Province: Alberta
- Specialized and rural municipalities: Lacombe County

Highway system
- Alberta Provincial Highway Network; List; Former
← Highway 49	→ Highway 52

Alberta Provincial Highway No. 50 is a 14.5 km (9.0 mi) east–west highway in central Alberta, Canada. It runs between the hamlets of Tees and Mirror, northeast of Red Deer.

== Major intersections ==
From west to east: The entire route is in Lacombe County.

Location	km	mi	Destinations	Notes
Tees	0.0	0.0	Highway 12 – Lacombe, Stettler	Western terminus
Mirror	14.4	8.9	Highway 21 – Three Hills, Camrose	Eastern terminus
1.000 mi = 1.609 km; 1.000 km = 0.621 mi
