= Kountry Meadows, Alberta =

Kountry Meadows Kountry Meadow Estates
- Designated place
- Location of Kountry Meadows Kountry Meadows (Canada)
- Coordinates: 52.313°N 114.279°W
- Country: Canada
- Province: Alberta
- Region: Central Alberta
- Census division: 8
- Municipal district: Red Deer County

Government
  - Type: Unincorporated
  - Governing body: Red Deer County Council

Area (2021)
  - Land: 0.13 km^{2} (0.050 sq mi)

Population (2021)
  - Total: 199
  - Density: 1,478.5/km^{2} (3,829/sq mi)
- Time zone: UTC−06:00 (Alberta Time)
- Area codes: 403, 587, 825

Kountry Meadows, also known as Kountry Meadow Estates, is an unincorporated community in Alberta, Canada within Red Deer County that is recognized as a designated place by Statistics Canada. It is located on the west side of Range Road 25A, 0.6 km (0.37 mi) south of Highway 11. It is adjacent to the Hamlet of Benalto to the south.

== Demographics ==
In the 2021 Census of Population conducted by Statistics Canada, Kountry Meadows had a population of 199 living in 103 of its 109 total private dwellings, a change of −9.1% from its 2016 population of 219. With a land area of 0.13 km^{2} (0.050 sq mi), it had a population density of 1,530.8/km^{2} (3,964.7/sq mi) in 2021.

As a designated place in the 2016 Census of Population conducted by Statistics Canada, Kountry Meadows had a population of 219 living in 105 of its 114 total private dwellings, a change of −3.9% from its 2011 population of 228. With a land area of 0.13 km^{2} (0.050 sq mi), it had a population density of 1,684.6/km^{2} (4,363.1/sq mi) in 2016.

== See also ==
- List of communities in Alberta
- List of designated places in Alberta
