= Benalto =

- Hamlet
- Location within Red Deer County Location within Alberta
- Coordinates: 52°18′28″N 114°16′42″W
- Country: Canada
- Province: Alberta
- Region: Central Alberta
- Census division: No. 8
- Municipal district: Red Deer County

Area (2021)
  - Land: 0.48 km^{2} (0.19 sq mi)

Population (2021)
  - Total: 198
  - Density: 411.2/km^{2} (1,065/sq mi)
- Time zone: UTC−06:00 (Alberta Time)
- Postal code: T0M 0H0
- Area codes: 403
- Highways: Highway 11

Benalto is a hamlet in central Alberta, Canada within Red Deer County. It is located approximately 13 kilometres (8.1 mi) west of the Town of Sylvan Lake. Benalto is also recognized by Statistics Canada as a designated place.

Kountry Meadows, a manufactured home community and designated place recognized by Statistics Canada, is immediately adjacent to the Hamlet of Benalto. Although it forms part of the community, the hamlet's boundaries do not include the manufactured home park at this time.

== Demographics ==
Population history of Benalto
Year	Pop.	±%
1941	96	—
1951	146	+52.1%
1956	127	−13.0%
1961	147	+15.7%
1966	107	−27.2%
1971	94	−12.1%
1976	72	−23.4%
1981	105	+45.8%
1986	107	+1.9%
1991	88	−17.8%
1996	100	+13.6%
2001	102	+2.0%
2006	133	+30.4%
2011	175	+31.6%
2016	177	+1.1%
2021	198	+11.9%
Source: Statistics Canada

In the 2021 Census of Population conducted by Statistics Canada, Benalto had a population of 198 living in 65 of its 66 total private dwellings, a change of 11.9% from its 2016 population of 177. With a land area of 0.48 km^{2} (0.19 sq mi), it had a population density of 412.5/km^{2} (1,068.4/sq mi) in 2021.

As a designated place in the 2016 Census of Population conducted by Statistics Canada, Benalto had a population of 177 living in 63 of its 66 total private dwellings, a change of 1.1% from its 2011 population of 175. With a land area of 0.48 km^{2} (0.19 sq mi), it had a population density of 368.8/km^{2} (955.1/sq mi) in 2016.

== See also ==
- List of communities in Alberta
- List of designated places in Alberta
- List of hamlets in Alberta
