= Gull Lake, Alberta =

Gull Lake
- Summer village
- Summer Village of Gull Lake
- Location within Alberta
- Coordinates: 52°27′28″N 113°57′5″W
- Country: Canada
- Province: Alberta
- Region: Central Alberta
- Municipal district: Lacombe County
- Census Divisions: No. 8

Government
  - Mayor: Linda D'Angelo
  - Governing body: Gull Lake Summer Village Council

Area (2021)
  - Land: 0.7 km^{2} (0.27 sq mi)
- Elevation: 907 m (2,976 ft)

Population (2021)
  - Total: 226
  - Density: 323.3/km^{2} (837/sq mi)
- Time zone: UTC−06:00 (Alberta Time)
- Highways: 12
- Waterways: Gull Lake
- Website: Official website

Gull Lake is a summer village located on the southern shore of Gull Lake, located approximately 24 km (15 mi)southeast of the Town of Rimbey in central Alberta, Canada.

== Demographics ==
In the 2021 Census of Population conducted by Statistics Canada, the Summer Village of Gull Lake had a population of 226 living in 95 of its 243 total private dwellings, a change of 28.4% from its 2016 population of 176. With a land area of 0.7 km^{2} (0.27 sq mi), it had a population density of 322.9/km^{2} (836.2/sq mi) in 2021.

In the 2016 Census of Population conducted by Statistics Canada, the Summer Village of Gull Lake had a population of 176 living in 79 of its 244 total private dwellings, a 44.3% change from its 2011 population of 122. With a land area of 0.7 km^{2} (0.27 sq mi), it had a population density of 251.4/km^{2} (651.2/sq mi) in 2016.

== Services ==
The Village of Gull Lake has a convenience store which has an ice cream shop and a liquor store called the wooden shoe. There is also a gas station there.

== See also ==
- List of communities in Alberta
- List of summer villages in Alberta
- List of resort villages in Saskatchewan
