= Nevis, Alberta =

Nevis
- Hamlet
- Location of Nevis in Alberta
- Coordinates: 52.3303°N 113.0314°W
- Country: Canada
- Province: Alberta
- Census division: No. 7
- Municipal district: County of Stettler No. 6

Government
  - Type: Unincorporated
  - Governing body: County of Stettler No. 6 Council

Area (2021)
  - Land: 0.65 km^{2} (0.25 sq mi)
- Elevation: 815 m (2,674 ft)

Population (2021)
  - Total: 30
  - Density: 46.4/km^{2} (120/sq mi)
- Time zone: UTC−06:00 (Alberta Time)

Nevis is a hamlet in central Alberta, Canada within the County of Stettler No. 6. It is located on Highway 12, approximately 17 kilometres (11 mi) southeast Alix and 8 kilometres (5.0 mi) west of Erskine. It has an elevation of 815 metres (2,674 ft).

The hamlet is located in Census Division No. 7 and in the federal riding of Crowfoot.

== Demographics ==
In the 2021 Census of Population conducted by Statistics Canada, Nevis had a population of 30 living in 12 of its 14 total private dwellings, a change of 20% from its 2016 population of 25. With a land area of 0.65 km^{2} (0.25 sq mi), it had a population density of 46.2/km^{2} (119.5/sq mi) in 2021.

As a designated place in the 2016 Census of Population conducted by Statistics Canada, Nevis had a population of 25 living in 13 of its 16 total private dwellings, a change of 0% from its 2011 population of 25. With a land area of 0.65 km^{2} (0.25 sq mi), it had a population density of 38.5/km^{2} (99.6/sq mi) in 2016.

== See also ==
- List of communities in Alberta
- List of designated places in Alberta
- List of hamlets in Alberta
