= Veteran, Alberta =

Veteran
- Village
- Village of Veteran
- Location in Special Area No. 4

- Location in Alberta
- Coordinates: 52°00′13″N 111°07′25″W
- Country: Canada
- Province: Alberta
- Planning region: Red Deer
- Special Area: No. 4
- Incorporated
  - Village: June 30, 1914

Government
  - Mayor: Jerry Wipf
  - Governing body: Veteran Village Council

Area (2021)
  - Land: 0.84 km^{2} (0.32 sq mi)
- Elevation: 795 m (2,608 ft)

Population (2021)
  - Total: 214
  - Density: 255.6/km^{2} (662/sq mi)
- Time zone: UTC−06:00 (Alberta Time)
- Area codes: +1-403, +1-587
- Highways: 12; 884
- Waterways: Hamilton Lake
- Website: veteran.ca

Veteran is a village in central Alberta, Canada. It is located on Highway 12 approximately 200 km (120 mi) east of the City of Red Deer. Consort is approximately 25 km (16 mi) to the east, while Coronation is approximately 26 km (16 mi) to the west.

== History ==
With the promise of land, many people made their way west to homestead in the Veteran area. Their ethnic origins were diverse but they shared in the optimism of a better life for themselves and their families.

Veteran incorporated as a village on June 30, 1914.

== Demographics ==
In the 2021 Census of Population conducted by Statistics Canada, the Village of Veteran had a population of 214 living in 100 of its 130 total private dwellings, a change of 3.4% from its 2016 population of 207. With a land area of 0.84 km^{2} (0.32 sq mi), it had a population density of 254.8/km^{2} (659.8/sq mi) in 2021.

The population of the Village of Veteran according to its 2017 municipal census is 239.

In the 2016 Census of Population conducted by Statistics Canada, the Village of Veteran recorded a population of 207 living in 102 of its 112 total private dwellings, a −16.9% change from its 2011 population of 249. With a land area of 0.84 km^{2} (0.32 sq mi), it had a population density of 246.4/km^{2} (638.2/sq mi) in 2016.

== Attractions ==
Attractions in Veteran include a campground and a museum. Other facilities within the community include a library, a park, a playground and a skateboard park. Churches within Veteran include the Full Gospel Church and Veteran United Church.

A nearby large hill named Nose Hill has historical significance as it was a meeting spot during the second North-West Rebellion.

== Sports ==
Veteran has its own curling club with three sheets of ice as well as an arena.

== Education ==
Veteran School serves 60 students enrolled in kindergarten through grade 9. Senior high students attend school in Consort.

== See also ==
- List of communities in Alberta
- List of villages in Alberta
