= Capilano, Edmonton =

Neighbourhood in Alberta, Canada

Capilano
- Neighbourhood
- Location of Capilano in Edmonton
- Coordinates: 53.555°N 113.424°W
- Country: Canada
- Province: Alberta
- City: Edmonton
- Quadrant: NW
- Ward: Métis
- Sector: Mature area

Government
  - Administrative body: Edmonton City Council
  - Councillor: Ashley Salvador

Area
  - Total: 1.3 km^{2} (0.50 sq mi)
- Elevation: 661 m (2,169 ft)

Population (2012)
  - Total: 2,692
  - Density: 2,070.8/km^{2} (5,363/sq mi)
  - Change (2009–12): ▼−2.6%
  - Dwellings: 1,100

Capilano is a residential neighbourhood in south east Edmonton, Alberta, Canada. The neighbourhood, established in the 1950s, overlooks the scenic North Saskatchewan River valley.

The neighbourhood is bounded on the north, north west and north east by the North Saskatchewan River valley. To the west, the neighbourhood overlooks Wayne Gretzky Drive. The southern boundary west of 50 Street is 106 Avenue. From 50 Street, the neighbourhood boundary follows a zig zag path running north east until it reaches the Gold Bar Ravine. The Gold Bar Ravine forms the neighbourhood's eastern boundary.

The community is represented by the Capilano Community League, established in 1958, which maintains a community hall, outdoor rink and tennis courts located at 54 Street and 108 Avenue.

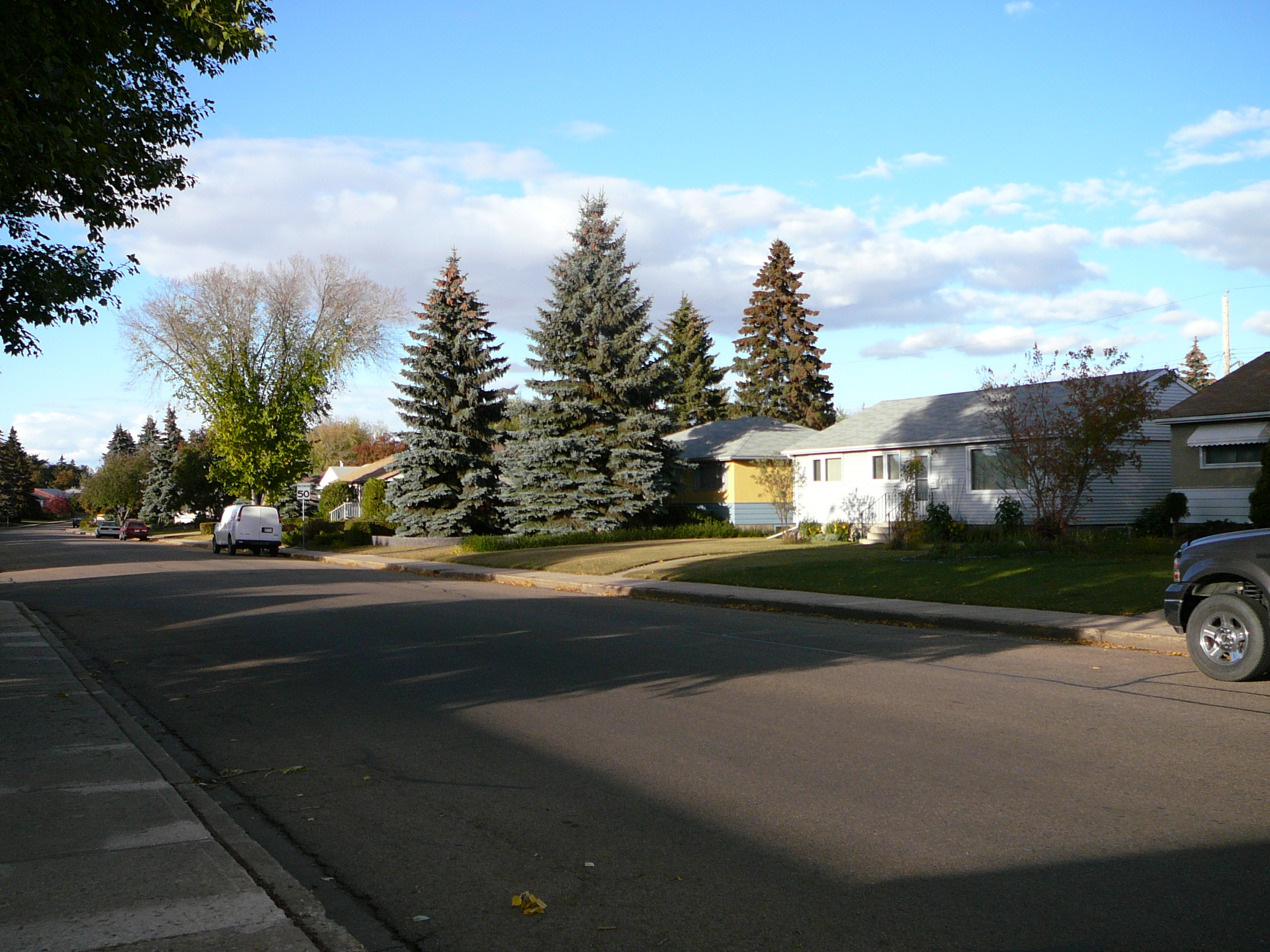
Residential street in Capilano

== Demographics ==
In the City of Edmonton's 2012 municipal census, Capilano had a population of 2,692 living in 1,100 dwellings, a -2.6% change from its 2009 population of 2,764. With a land area of 1.3 km^{2} (0.50 sq mi), it had a population density of 2,070.8 people/km^{2} in 2012.

== Residential development ==
Residential construction in the neighbourhood occurred largely after the end of World War II with 84.6% of, or 17 out of every 20, dwelling being constructed between 1946 and 1960. Almost all of the remaining dwellings were built during the 1960s, and development was essentially complete by 1970.

According to the 2005 municipal census, 100% of the residences in the neighbourhood were single-family dwellings. Substantially all (96%) of the residences are owner-occupied with only 4% being rented.

== Schools ==
There are two schools in the neighbourhood:

- Suzuki Charter School
  - Suzuki Charter School occupies the former Capilano Elementary School. It is a charter school with classes from K-9 and preschool.
- St. Gabriel Catholic Elementary/Junior/Senior High School
  - St. Gabriel Catholic Elementary School is an elementary/junior/senior high school in the Capilano area just off 106th avenue.
- Calilano Playschool
  - The Capilano Playschool is a play-based parent cooperative for 3 & 4 year olds. It is housed in Hardisty School, a K-9 Edmonton Public School located immediately south of Capilano in the Fulton neighbourhood.
- McNally High School
  - The Edmonton Public School System's McNally High School is located to the west in the neighbourhood of Forest Heights.

== Access to shopping, sites and services ==
The neighbourhood is located a short distance to the north of Edmonton's Capilano Mall, a major shopping centre, and the Capilano Transit Centre.

== See also ==
- Edmonton Transit Service
- Edmonton Federation of Community Leagues
