= Bodo, Alberta =

Bodo
- Hamlet
- Location of Bodo Bodo (Canada)
- Coordinates: 52°09′12″N 110°04′45″W
- Country: Canada
- Province: Alberta
- Region: Central Alberta
- Census division: 7
- Municipal district: Municipal District of Provost No. 52

Government
  - Type: Unincorporated
  - Governing body: Municipal District of Provost No. 52 Council

Area (2021)
  - Land: 0.36 km^{2} (0.14 sq mi)

Population (2021)
  - Total: 30
  - Density: 83.2/km^{2} (215/sq mi)
- Time zone: UTC−06:00 (Alberta Time)
- Area codes: 403, 587, 825

Bodo is a hamlet in central Alberta, Canada within the Municipal District of Provost No. 52. It is located approximately 23 kilometres (14 mi) south of Highway 13 and 25 km (16 mi) southeast of Provost. The community was named after the town of Bodø, Norway.

Bodo is known for its archaeological site, which is one of the largest and most well-preserved pre-contact archeological areas in Western Canada. The area is run by the Bodo Archeological Society, a non-profit organization committed to the protection and preservation of the site.

== Demographics ==
In the 2021 Census of Population conducted by Statistics Canada, Bodo had a population of 30 living in 10 of its 12 total private dwellings, a change of 50% from its 2016 population of 20. With a land area of 0.36 km^{2} (0.14 sq mi), it had a population density of 83.3/km^{2} (215.8/sq mi) in 2021.

As a designated place in the 2016 Census of Population conducted by Statistics Canada, Bodo had a population of 20 living in 13 of its 15 total private dwellings, a change of 11.1% from its 2011 population of 18. With a land area of 0.36 km^{2} (0.14 sq mi), it had a population density of 55.6/km^{2} (143.9/sq mi) in 2016.

== See also ==
- List of communities in Alberta
- List of hamlets in Alberta
