= Joffre, Alberta =

Joffre
- Hamlet
- Location of Joffre Joffre (Canada)
- Coordinates: 52°20′10″N 113°32′14″W
- Country: Canada
- Province: Alberta
- Region: Central Alberta
- Census division: 8
- Municipal district: Lacombe County

Government
  - Type: Unincorporated
  - Governing body: Lacombe County Council

Area (2021)
  - Land: 0.21 km^{2} (0.081 sq mi)

Population (2021)
  - Total: 128
  - Density: 600.1/km^{2} (1,554/sq mi)
- Time zone: UTC−06:00 (Alberta Time)
- Area codes: 403, 587, 825

Joffre is a hamlet in central Alberta, Canada within Lacombe County. It is located 6 kilometres (3.7 mi) north of Highway 11, approximately 20 kilometres (12 mi) northeast of Red Deer.

== Demographics ==
In the 2021 Census of Population conducted by Statistics Canada, Joffre had a population of 128 living in 63 of its 66 total private dwellings, a change of −25.1% from its 2016 population of 171. With a land area of 0.21 km^{2} (0.081 sq mi), it had a population density of 609.5/km^{2} (1,578.7/sq mi) in 2021.

As a designated place in the 2016 Census of Population conducted by Statistics Canada, Joffre had a population of 171 living in 73 of its 75 total private dwellings, a change of −0.6% from its 2011 population of 172. With a land area of 0.21 km^{2} (0.081 sq mi), it had a population density of 814.3/km^{2} (2,109.0/sq mi) in 2016.

== History ==
The community name was originally a Post Office named in 1918 after Marshal J. J. C. Joffre, Commander-in-Chief of the Allied army 1915–1917. Previously it had been named "Blades" after a local family of pioneers.

== See also ==
- List of communities in Alberta
- List of designated places in Alberta
- List of hamlets in Alberta
