= Brownfield, Alberta =

Brownfield
- Hamlet
- Location of Brownfield Brownfield (Canada)
- Coordinates: 52°19′02″N 111°25′59″W
- Country: Canada
- Province: Alberta
- Region: Central Alberta
- Census division: 7
- Municipal district: County of Paintearth No. 18

Government
  - Type: Unincorporated
  - Governing body: County of Paintearth No. 18 Council

Population (1991)
  - Total: 27
- Time zone: UTC−06:00 (Alberta Time)
- Area codes: 403, 587, 825

Brownfield is a hamlet in central Alberta, Canada within the County of Paintearth No. 18. It is located approximately 25 km (16 mi) north of Highway 12 and 122 km (76 mi) southeast of Camrose. It is only a few miles south from the Battle River and positioned along Highway 872.

Named in 1907 after Charles D. Brownfield, the first postmaster of the local Post Office.

== Demographics ==
Brownfield recorded a population of 27 in the 1991 Census of Population conducted by Statistics Canada.

== Education ==
Brownfield is home to the Brownfield Community School, which is a part of Clearview School Division No. 71. The Brownfield Community School includes programs from Pre-School to Grade Nine. Following Grade Nine students are bused to Coronation, Alberta for high school.

The building is also home to the Brownfield Public Library, which is a member of the Parkland Regional Library System.

== Recreation ==
Located in Brownfield is the Brownfield Recreation Centre. It includes a two sheet curling rink, concession area, bar, floor curling/dance floor, and stage with sound system. The property also has a small outdoor skating rink and skate shack. It provides a venue for events like curling bonspiels, weddings, community meals (e.g. the annual turkey supper), wedding showers, funerals, and family reunions.

The Brownfield Community School has a small gymnasium. It is used for the local Junior High sports teams, the Brownfield Bobcats (basketball, volleyball, etc.); youth group nights; school concerts; and fitness groups. On the school grounds there are two playground sets, swings, a sand volleyball court, cement basketball court, rough soccer field, and two baseball backstops.

A few miles North in the Battle River Valley lies the County of Paintearth run Burma Park. It has three baseball diamonds, including two with shale and dugouts. Burma Park is a campground and offers a number of RV and Tenting sites.

The surrounding area of Brownfield, especially the Battle River Valley, teems with wildlife and is a great place to go hunting, in the various hunting seasons.

== Climate ==
Climate data for Brownfield
| Month | Jan | Feb | Mar | Apr | May | Jun | Jul | Aug | Sep | Oct | Nov | Dec | Year |
|---|---|---|---|---|---|---|---|---|---|---|---|---|---|
| Record high °C (°F) | 10.0 (50.0) | 14.5 (58.1) | 26.0 (78.8) | 30.6 (87.1) | 34.5 (94.1) | 39.0 (102.2) | 40.0 (104.0) | 37.8 (100.0) | 36.1 (97.0) | 29.0 (84.2) | 20.6 (69.1) | 16.5 (61.7) | 40.0 (104.0) |
| Mean daily maximum °C (°F) | −7.2 (19.0) | −4.2 (24.4) | 1.5 (34.7) | 11.5 (52.7) | 17.9 (64.2) | 21.5 (70.7) | 24.4 (75.9) | 23.9 (75.0) | 18.0 (64.4) | 10.8 (51.4) | −0.3 (31.5) | −5.3 (22.5) | 9.4 (48.9) |
| Daily mean °C (°F) | −12.3 (9.9) | −9.7 (14.5) | −3.9 (25.0) | 4.8 (40.6) | 10.6 (51.1) | 14.7 (58.5) | 17.2 (63.0) | 16.4 (61.5) | 10.9 (51.6) | 4.3 (39.7) | −5.1 (22.8) | −10.4 (13.3) | 3.1 (37.6) |
| Mean daily minimum °C (°F) | −17.4 (0.7) | −15.2 (4.6) | −9.2 (15.4) | −1.9 (28.6) | 3.3 (37.9) | 7.9 (46.2) | 10.0 (50.0) | 8.8 (47.8) | 3.7 (38.7) | −2.2 (28.0) | −10.0 (14.0) | −15.4 (4.3) | −3.1 (26.4) |
| Record low °C (°F) | −47.2 (−53.0) | −45.6 (−50.1) | −39.5 (−39.1) | −31.7 (−25.1) | −10.0 (14.0) | −5.0 (23.0) | −1.1 (30.0) | −3.0 (26.6) | −10.0 (14.0) | −27.0 (−16.6) | −34.0 (−29.2) | −46.1 (−51.0) | −47.2 (−53.0) |
| Average precipitation mm (inches) | 24.6 (0.97) | 15.7 (0.62) | 24.3 (0.96) | 33.4 (1.31) | 44.3 (1.74) | 84.4 (3.32) | 75.8 (2.98) | 63.0 (2.48) | 41.1 (1.62) | 22.9 (0.90) | 18.8 (0.74) | 21.9 (0.86) | 470.0 (18.50) |
| Average rainfall mm (inches) | 1.5 (0.06) | 0.2 (0.01) | 2.8 (0.11) | 16.4 (0.65) | 37.3 (1.47) | 84.4 (3.32) | 75.8 (2.98) | 63.0 (2.48) | 37.9 (1.49) | 10.1 (0.40) | 1.7 (0.07) | 0.6 (0.02) | 331.6 (13.06) |
| Average snowfall cm (inches) | 23.1 (9.1) | 15.6 (6.1) | 21.5 (8.5) | 17.0 (6.7) | 6.9 (2.7) | 0.0 (0.0) | 0.0 (0.0) | 0.0 (0.0) | 3.2 (1.3) | 12.8 (5.0) | 17.1 (6.7) | 21.4 (8.4) | 138.5 (54.5) |
| Average precipitation days (≥ 0.2 mm) | 12.0 | 8.7 | 9.2 | 8.7 | 11.1 | 13.2 | 13.8 | 11.8 | 9.6 | 6.8 | 9.1 | 10.6 | 124.6 |
| Average rainy days (≥ 0.2 mm) | 0.6 | 0.4 | 1.3 | 4.9 | 10.6 | 13.2 | 13.8 | 11.8 | 9.0 | 4.6 | 1.9 | 0.5 | 72.6 |
| Average snowy days (≥ 0.2 cm) | 11.6 | 8.5 | 8.3 | 5.0 | 1.0 | 0.0 | 0.0 | 0.0 | 0.9 | 2.8 | 7.7 | 10.4 | 56.1 |
Source 1: Environment Canada
Source 2: Precipitation Days Only

== See also ==
- List of communities in Alberta
- List of hamlets in Alberta
