= Botha, Alberta =

Botha
- Hamlet
- Hamlet of Botha
- Location within Alberta
- Coordinates: 52°18′22.0″N 112°31′38.4″W
- Country: Canada
- Province: Alberta
- Region: Central Alberta
- Census division: 7
- Municipal district: County of Stettler No. 6
- Founded: 1909
- Incorporated
  - Village: September 5, 1911
- Dissolved: September 1, 2017

Government
  - Governing body: County of Stettler No. 6 Council

Area (2021)
  - Land: 1.08 km^{2} (0.42 sq mi)

Population (2021)
  - Total: 180
  - Density: 166/km^{2} (430/sq mi)
- Time zone: UTC−06:00 (Alberta Time)
- Highways: Highway 12; Highway 850

Botha is a hamlet in central Alberta, Canada within the County of Stettler No. 6. It is located approximately 88 km (55 mi) east of Red Deer and 13 km (8.1 mi) east of Stettler.

== History ==
The community was founded in 1909 around the train station named after Louis Botha. Botha then incorporated as a village on September 5, 1911. It dissolved from village status 106 years later on September 1, 2017, becoming a hamlet under the jurisdiction of the County of Stettler No. 6.

== Demographics ==
In the 2021 Census of Population conducted by Statistics Canada, Botha had a population of 180 living in 70 of its 78 total private dwellings, a change of −11.8% from its 2016 population of 204. With a land area of 1.08 km^{2} (0.42 sq mi), it had a population density of 166.7/km^{2} (431.7/sq mi) in 2021.

As a designated place in the 2016 Census of Population conducted by Statistics Canada, Botha had a population of 204 living in 80 of its 81 total private dwellings, a 16.6% change from its 2011 population of 175. With a land area of 1.1 km^{2} (0.42 sq mi), it had a population density of 185.5/km^{2} (480.3/sq mi) in 2016.

== Education ==
Botha School is part of Clearview Public Schools.

== See also ==
- List of communities in Alberta
- List of hamlets in Alberta
