= Tees, Alberta =

Hamlet in central Alberta, Canada

Tees
- Hamlet
- Location of Tees Tees (Canada)
- Coordinates: 52°28′03″N 113°19′15″W
- Country: Canada
- Province: Alberta
- Region: Central Alberta
- Census division: 8
- Municipal district: Lacombe County

Government
  - Type: Unincorporated
  - Governing body: Lacombe County Council

Area (2021)
  - Land: 0.11 km^{2} (0.042 sq mi)

Population (2021)
  - Total: 73
  - Density: 644.9/km^{2} (1,670/sq mi)
- Time zone: UTC−06:00 (Alberta Time)
- Area codes: 403, 587, 825

Tees is a hamlet in central Alberta, Canada, within Lacombe County. It is located 1 kilometre (0.62 mi) north of Highway 12, approximately 40 kilometres (25 mi) northeast of Red Deer.

== Demographics ==
Population history of Tees
Year	Pop.	±%
1941	89	—
1951	90	+1.1%
1956	44	−51.1%
1961	63	+43.2%
1966	58	−7.9%
1971	64	+10.3%
1976	53	−17.2%
1981	93	+75.5%
1986	81	−12.9%
1991	74	−8.6%
1991A	72	−2.7%
1996	84	+16.7%
2001	82	−2.4%
2006	76	−7.3%
2011	77	+1.3%
2016	73	−5.2%
2021	73	+0.0%
Source: Statistics Canada

In the 2021 Census of Population conducted by Statistics Canada, Tees had a population of 73 living in 28 of its 31 total private dwellings, a change of 0% from its 2016 population of 73. With a land area of 0.11 km^{2} (0.042 sq mi), it had a population density of 663.6/km^{2} (1,718.8/sq mi) in 2021.

As a designated place in the 2016 Census of Population conducted by Statistics Canada, Tees had a population of 73 living in 30 of its 35 total private dwellings, a change of −5.2% from its 2011 population of 77. With a land area of 0.11 km^{2} (0.042 sq mi), it had a population density of 663.6/km^{2} (1,718.8/sq mi) in 2016.

== See also ==
- List of communities in Alberta
- List of designated places in Alberta
- List of hamlets in Alberta
