= Red Willow, Alberta =

Red Willow
- Hamlet
- Location of Red Willow in Alberta
- Coordinates: 52.4500°N 112.5667°W
- Country: Canada
- Province: Alberta
- Census division: No. 7
- Municipal district: County of Stettler No. 6

Government
  - Type: Unincorporated
  - Governing body: County of Stettler No. 6 Council

Area (2021)
  - Land: 1.31 km^{2} (0.51 sq mi)
- Elevation: 785 m (2,575 ft)

Population (2021)
  - Total: 63
  - Density: 48.2/km^{2} (125/sq mi)
- Time zone: UTC−06:00 (Alberta Time)

Red Willow is a hamlet in central Alberta, Canada within the County of Stettler No. 6. It is located on Highway 850, approximately 16 kilometres (9.9 mi) northeast of Stettler and 14 kilometres (8.7 mi) south of Donalda. It has an elevation of 785 metres (2,575 ft).

The hamlet is located in Census Division No. 7 and in the federal riding of Crowfoot.

== Demographics ==
Population history of Red Willow
Year	Pop.	±%
1941	93	—
1951	89	−4.3%
1956	84	−5.6%
1961	95	+13.1%
1966	63	−33.7%
1971	40	−36.5%
1976	37	−7.5%
1981	51	+37.8%
1986	33	−35.3%
1991	29	−12.1%
1991A	35	+20.7%
1996	29	−17.1%
2001	40	+37.9%
2006	45	+12.5%
2011	40	−11.1%
2016	35	−12.5%
2021	63	+80.0%
Source: Statistics Canada

In the 2021 Census of Population conducted by Statistics Canada, Red Willow had a population of 63 living in 25 of its 28 total private dwellings, a change of 80% from its 2016 population of 35. With a land area of 1.31 km^{2} (0.51 sq mi), it had a population density of 48.1/km^{2} (124.6/sq mi) in 2021.

As a designated place in the 2016 Census of Population conducted by Statistics Canada, Red Willow had a population of 35 living in 16 of its 20 total private dwellings, a change of −12.5% from its 2011 population of 40. With a land area of 1.32 km^{2} (0.51 sq mi), it had a population density of 26.5/km^{2} (68.7/sq mi) in 2016.

== See also ==
- List of communities in Alberta
- List of designated places in Alberta
- List of hamlets in Alberta
