= Eckville =

- Town
- Town of Eckville
- Flag
- Motto: Community of Choice
- Location of Eckville in Alberta
- Coordinates: 52°21′44″N 114°21′41″W
- Country: Canada
- Province: Alberta
- Region: Central Alberta
- Census division: 8
- Municipal district: Lacombe County
- Incorporated
  - Village: 3 November 1921
  - Town: 1 July 1966

Government
  - Mayor: Colleen Ebden
  - Governing body: Eckville Town Council
  - MP: Blaine Calkins -Cons
  - MLA: Jason Nixon (UCP) (Rimbey-Rocky Mountain House-Sundre)

Area (2021)
  - Land: 1.61 km^{2} (0.62 sq mi)
- Elevation: 930 m (3,050 ft)

Population (2021)
  - Total: 1,014
  - Density: 629.5/km^{2} (1,630/sq mi)
- Time zone: UTC−06:00 (Alberta Time)
- Postal code span: T0M 0X0
- Area code: 1+403
- Highways: Highway 766
- Waterways: Medicine River
- Website: Official website

Eckville is a town in central Alberta, Canada. It is west of Red Deer on Highway 766 just north of Highway 11.

== History ==
Eckville gets its name from A. E. T. Eckford, a European colonist. Eckville relocated to its current location in 1912, after the Canadian Northern Railway completed its local line. The current location on the Canadian Northern Railway was briefly known as Kootuk, but the name Eckville prevailed. Eckville was incorporated as a village in 1921 and became a town in 1966. Eckville had a significant Estonian population, with 171 Estonians living there by 1910.

== Geography ==
=== Climate ===
Eckville experiences a humid continental climate (Köppen climate classification Dfb) which borders on a subarctic climate (Dfc).

Climate data for Eckville, Alberta
Month	Jan	Feb	Mar	Apr	May	Jun	Jul	Aug	Sep	Oct	Nov	Dec	Year
Record high °C (°F)	14.0 (57.2)	19.0 (66.2)	23.5 (74.3)	33.3 (91.9)	31.5 (88.7)	32.5 (90.5)	33.9 (93.0)	33.5 (92.3)	32.0 (89.6)	28.5 (83.3)	22.2 (72.0)	16.0 (60.8)	33.9 (93.0)
Mean daily maximum °C (°F)	−4.5 (23.9)	−2.2 (28.0)	2.5 (36.5)	10.9 (51.6)	16.4 (61.5)	19.5 (67.1)	22.2 (72.0)	22.0 (71.6)	17.0 (62.6)	10.6 (51.1)	0.9 (33.6)	−3.6 (25.5)	9.3 (48.7)
Daily mean °C (°F)	−10.1 (13.8)	−8.2 (17.2)	−3.3 (26.1)	4.3 (39.7)	9.6 (49.3)	13.3 (55.9)	15.7 (60.3)	15.1 (59.2)	10.1 (50.2)	4.2 (39.6)	−4.5 (23.9)	−9.1 (15.6)	3.1 (37.6)
Mean daily minimum °C (°F)	−15.7 (3.7)	−14.1 (6.6)	−8.9 (16.0)	−2.4 (27.7)	2.8 (37.0)	7.1 (44.8)	9.2 (48.6)	8.1 (46.6)	3.2 (37.8)	−2.3 (27.9)	−9.7 (14.5)	−14.5 (5.9)	−3.1 (26.4)
Record low °C (°F)	−45.6 (−50.1)	−42.5 (−44.5)	−36.1 (−33.0)	−24.4 (−11.9)	−9.0 (15.8)	−2.5 (27.5)	0.0 (32.0)	−4.0 (24.8)	−10.0 (14.0)	−29.0 (−20.2)	−37.5 (−35.5)	−44.4 (−47.9)	−45.6 (−50.1)
Average precipitation mm (inches)	21.1 (0.83)	16.6 (0.65)	21.8 (0.86)	24.8 (0.98)	59.7 (2.35)	101.4 (3.99)	106.7 (4.20)	77.0 (3.03)	61.9 (2.44)	23.3 (0.92)	18.9 (0.74)	16.5 (0.65)	549.6 (21.64)
Average rainfall mm (inches)	0.1 (0.00)	0.0 (0.0)	0.1 (0.00)	9.4 (0.37)	52.0 (2.05)	101.4 (3.99)	106.7 (4.20)	77.0 (3.03)	58.1 (2.29)	11.8 (0.46)	0.5 (0.02)	0.0 (0.0)	416.8 (16.41)
Average snowfall cm (inches)	21.0 (8.3)	16.6 (6.5)	21.8 (8.6)	15.5 (6.1)	7.7 (3.0)	0.0 (0.0)	0.0 (0.0)	0.0 (0.0)	3.9 (1.5)	11.5 (4.5)	18.4 (7.2)	16.4 (6.5)	132.7 (52.2)
Source: Environment Canada

== Demographics ==
In the 2021 Census of Population conducted by Statistics Canada, the Town of Eckville had a population of 1,014 living in 425 of its 472 total private dwellings, a change of −9.9% from its 2016 population of 1,125. With a land area of 1.61 km^{2} (0.62 sq mi), it had a population density of 629.8/km^{2} (1,631.2/sq mi) in 2021.

In the 2016 Census of Population conducted by Statistics Canada, the Town of Eckville recorded a population of 1,125 living in 443 of its 465 total private dwellings, which represents no change from its 2011 population of 1,125. With a land area of 1.6 km^{2} (0.62 sq mi), it had a population density of 703.1/km^{2} (1,821.1/sq mi) in 2016.

== Culture ==
Eckville is home to several festivals and events throughout the year:

- Eckville Indoor Rodeo
- Bull-arena
- Eckville 50s & 60s Dance Jamboree
- Canada Day celebrations
- Eckville Winter Carnival
- Tree-lighting Ceremony

== Education ==
Eckville has two public schools, Eckville Junior/Senior High School and Eckville Elementary. The town is relatively close to Sylvan Lake and many students from Eckville attend schools there. Eckville is also a short drive from Red Deer College.

Eckville Junior/Senior High School attracted national attention in 1984 when history teacher and vice-principal James Keegstra was charged under the Criminal Code of Canada for teaching his students antisemitic material, including Holocaust denial. Keegstra was stripped of his teaching credentials and convicted. His appeals eventually reached the Supreme Court of Canada in 1990, where his conviction was upheld in R v Keegstra. Keegstra was mayor of Eckville at the time, but was defeated in a subsequent election.

== Notable people ==
- Mellisa Hollingsworth, Olympic medallist in skeleton
- James Keegstra, former mayor, convicted of hate speech in a landmark Canadian legal case

== See also ==
- List of communities in Alberta
- List of towns in Alberta
