= Gadsby, Alberta =

Gadsby
- Hamlet
- Hamlet of Gadsby
- Location within Alberta
- Coordinates: 52°17′45″N 112°21′43″W
- Country: Canada
- Province: Alberta
- Region: Central Alberta
- Census division: 7
- Municipal district: County of Stettler No. 6
- Founded: 1909
- Incorporated
  - Village: May 6, 1910
- Dissolution: February 1, 2020

Area (2021)
  - Land: 0.72 km^{2} (0.28 sq mi)

Population (2021)
  - Total: 36
  - Density: 49.7/km^{2} (129/sq mi)
- Time zone: UTC−06:00 (Alberta Time)
- Highways: 12, 852

Gadsby is a hamlet in central Alberta, Canada that is under the jurisdiction of the County of Stettler No. 6. It is located east of Red Deer on Highway 852 just north of Highway 12. Incorporated in 1909, it dissolved from village status in early 2020.

== History ==
Gadsby was named for Toronto reporter Henry Franklin Gadsby, the namesake for a post office that was opened in 1909. It was incorporated as the Village of Gadsby on May 6, 1910. At a population of 40, Gadsby was Alberta's smallest village as of the 2016 census. It dissolved from village status to become a hamlet under the jurisdiction of the County of Stettler No. 6 on February 1, 2020.

== Demographics ==
In the 2021 Census of Population conducted by Statistics Canada, Gadsby had a population of 36 living in 16 of its 18 total private dwellings, a change of −10% from its 2016 population of 40. With a land area of 0.72 km^{2} (0.28 sq mi), it had a population density of 50.0/km^{2} (129.5/sq mi) in 2021.

As a designated place in the 2016 Census of Population conducted by Statistics Canada, Gadsby had a population of 40 living in 24 of its 25 total private dwellings, a 60% change from its 2011 population of 25. With a land area of 0.75 km^{2} (0.29 sq mi), it had a population density of 53.3/km^{2} (138.1/sq mi) in 2016.

== Notable people ==
- Barbara Kent, silent film actress
- Chester Reynolds, Alberta politician

== See also ==
- List of communities in Alberta
- List of former urban municipalities in Alberta
- List of hamlets in Alberta
