= Mirror, Alberta =

Mirror
- Hamlet
- Location of Mirror in Alberta
- Coordinates: 52°27′54″N 113°06′43″W
- Country: Canada
- Province: Alberta
- Census division: No. 8
- Municipal district: Lacombe County
- Incorporated
  - Village: July 12, 1912
- Dissolution: January 1, 2004

Area (2021)
  - Land: 2.3 km^{2} (0.89 sq mi)

Population (2021)
  - Total: 481
  - Density: 208.7/km^{2} (541/sq mi)
- Time zone: UTC−06:00 (Alberta Time)

Mirror is a hamlet in Lacombe County within central Alberta, Canada. It is located at the junction of Highway 50 and Highway 21, approximately 42 km (26 mi) east of Lacombe and 52.2 km (32.47 mi) northeast of Red Deer.

Founded in 1870, Mirror was incorporated as a village on July 12, 1912, and remained a village until January 1, 2004, when it was dissolved to become a hamlet under the jurisdiction of Lacombe County.

== Demographics ==
In the 2021 Census of Population conducted by Statistics Canada, Mirror had a population of 481 living in 253 of its 270 total private dwellings, a change of −4.2% from its 2016 population of 502. With a land area of 2.3 km^{2} (0.89 sq mi), it had a population density of 209.1/km^{2} (541.6/sq mi) in 2021.

As a designated place in the 2016 Census of Population conducted by Statistics Canada, Mirror had a population of 502 living in 240 of its 261 total private dwellings, a change of 7.3% from its 2011 population of 468. With a land area of 2.3 km^{2} (0.89 sq mi), it had a population density of 218.3/km^{2} (565.3/sq mi) in 2016.

== History ==
=== Lamerton ===
Lamerton started as the Buffalo lake trading post in 1892. It was situated on the S.E. corner of the N.E. 1/4-33-40-22, just north of the creek that joins Spotted Lake to Buffalo Lake. The post office was opened in 1893 and the first N.W.M.P detachment was opened about 1895. The police were there through 1897 and then went away. In 1902 and 1903 a constable Vernon was stationed in Lamerton but there are no more records of the detachment. By 1907 there was a large grocery and dry goods store, livery barn, hardware store, confectionery, blacksmith shop, creamery, a church, and a hotel. The majority of these buildings were either moved or sold after the Grand Trunk Pacific Railway decided to build their roundhouse in Mirror. The only remaining buildings on the old town site are a house and police barracks that were moved together to make a farm house.

=== Establishment ===
The Grand Trunk Pacific Railway in 1911 built a branch line from Southern Alberta to connect Edmonton and Calgary, running their railroad through Tofield, down to Camrose, west of Buffalo Lake, across the Red Deer River, towards Trochu, Three Hills, Beiseker, and southwest Calgary. The railway was also expected to pass through the Lamerton trading post. However, they ran into difficulty when they were trying to purchase the land and they constructed their divisional point two miles to the South. This resulted in the Village of Mirror being established. The construction of the railway in Mirror caused Lamerton to be quickly abandoned, with its residents and many of its buildings being moved to Mirror.

=== Arrival of the railway ===
In 1912, many buildings were moved into the new town site, which included a post office, hardware store, drug store, lumber yard, restaurant, and the Imperial Hotel. There were two livery stables and two pool halls. The Bank of Commerce from Lamerton and the Bank of Toronto opened in Mirror.

Dr. Meyers was the village doctor, followed by Dr. McLennan who practiced medicine in Mirror for years. Dr. Chown was the last doctor and served the community for 30 years.

The newspaper The Mirror Journal, owned by C. Good, was printed for a time.

Mirror was known as the railway town, and employed a large number of railway employees. The Grand Trunk Pacific Railway became a part of the Canadian National Railway in 1920. Since then the line running through Mirror has been operated by CN.

The Anglican, the United and the Catholic Church served the religious needs of the village for many years. Originally, Catholic services were held in local homes. The Anglican Church built in 1895 preceded Mirror, and the United church was the Methodist church from Lamerton.

=== Decline ===
With the introduction and the increasing popularity of diesel powered engines a divisional point in between Edmonton and Calgary was no longer necessary, rendering the facilities at Mirror obsolete. The roundhouse was eventually closed and leveled. All the bustle and activity that marked the village for so many decades slowly died out as the majority of railway personnel were either transferred to other areas or retired. As the railroaders left, the local economy declined, and the village of Mirror dissolved to a hamlet in 2004.

== Amenities ==
- Buffalo Lake is located 22 km east.
- The Narrows Provincial Recreation Area is 10.2 km from Mirror.

== Name origin ==
Mirror was named after a British national tabloid newspaper, the Daily Mirror of London, England.

== See also ==
- List of former urban municipalities in Alberta
