= Clive, Alberta =

Clive
- Village
- Village of Clive
- Location in Alberta
- Coordinates: 52°28′39″N 113°26′50″W
- Country: Canada
- Province: Alberta
- Region: Central Alberta
- Census division: 8
- Municipal district: Lacombe County
- Incorporated
  - Village: January 9, 1912

Government
  - Mayor: Luci Henry
  - Governing body: Clive Village Council
  - MP: Blaine Calkins

Area (2021)
  - Land: 2.17 km^{2} (0.84 sq mi)
- Elevation: 850 m (2,790 ft)

Population (2021)
  - Total: 775
  - Density: 357.2/km^{2} (925/sq mi)
- Time zone: UTC−06:00 (Alberta Time)
- Highways: Highway 12
- Website: Official website

Clive /ˈklaɪv/ is a village in central Alberta, Canada. It is located 15 minutes east of Lacombe and 30 minutes from Red Deer.

The village was named in honour of Robert Clive, Commander-in-Chief, India.

== Demographics ==
In the 2021 Census of Population conducted by Statistics Canada, the Village of Clive had a population of 775 living in 307 of its 321 total private dwellings, a change of 8.4% from its 2016 population of 715. With a land area of 2.17 km^{2} (0.84 sq mi), it had a population density of 357.1/km^{2} (925.0/sq mi) in 2021.

In the 2016 Census of Population conducted by Statistics Canada, the Village of Clive recorded a population of 715 living in 286 of its 306 total private dwellings, a 5.9% change from its 2011 population of 675. With a land area of 2.17 km^{2} (0.84 sq mi), it had a population density of 329.5/km^{2} (853.4/sq mi) in 2016.

== Services ==
The Village of Clive has a grocery store, two bars and numerous other services.

== Education ==
Clive School is located on the north end of Clive, with about 250-300 students enrolled in kindergarten through grade nine.

== Amenities ==
Clive has a skate park built beside the school. It includes two eight foot quarter pipes, two six foot quarter pipes, two four foot quarter pipes, and box stairs,

Clive also has an 18-hole disc golf course behind the ball diamond. The course record is 57 shot by little Jimmy McClellan on his 17th birthday.

== See also ==
- List of communities in Alberta
- List of villages in Alberta
