= Stauffer, Alberta =

Coordinates: 52°10′26″N 114°35′51″W

Location of Stauffer Alberta

Stauffer is an unincorporated community in central Alberta within Clearwater County, located 12 kilometres (7.5 mi) north of Highway 54, 55 kilometres (34 mi) west of Red Deer.
