= Halkirk, Alberta =

Halkirk
- Hamlet
- Hamlet of Halkirk
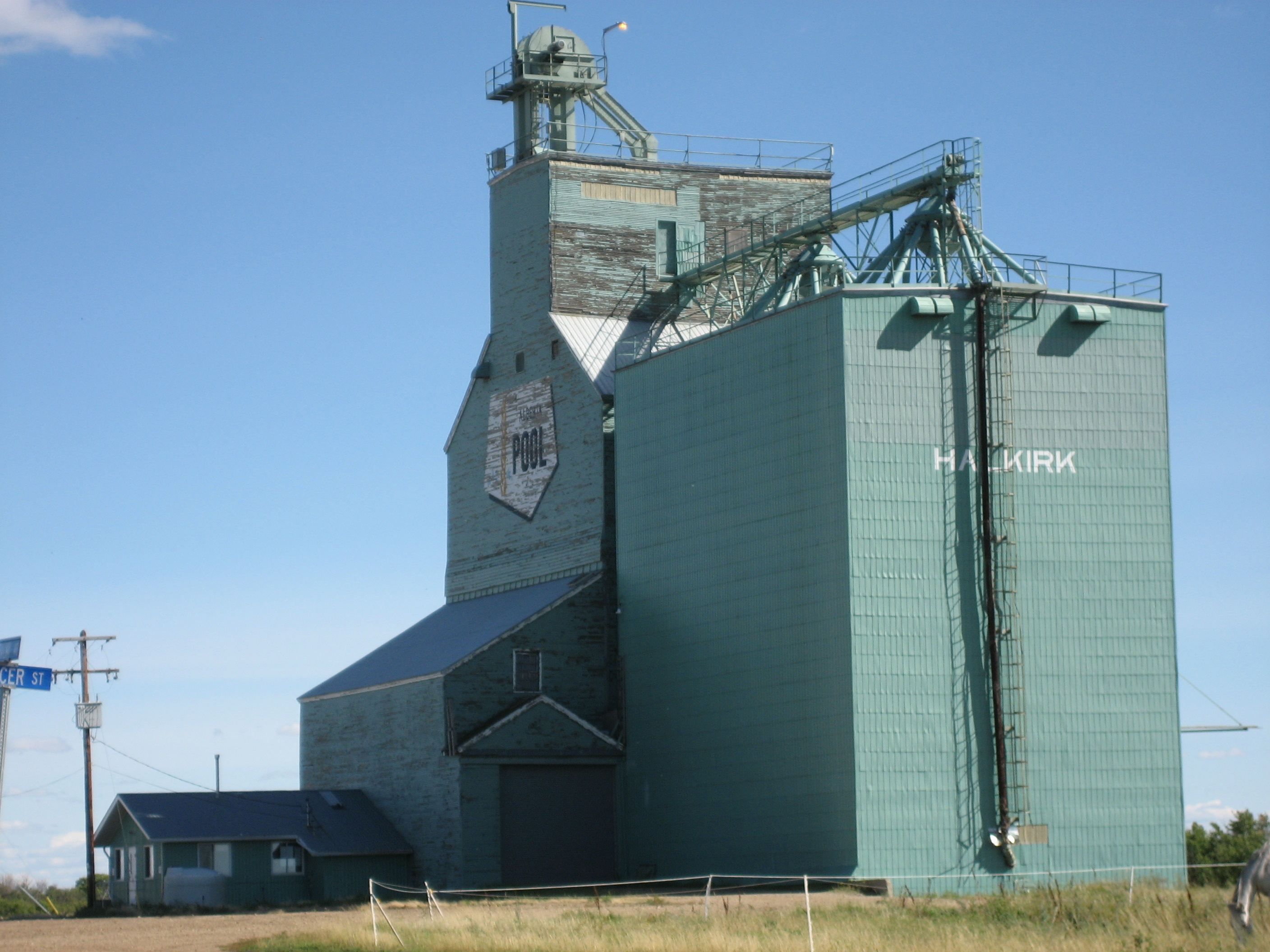
- Halkirk Grain Elevator 2007

- Location within Alberta Location within Canada
- Coordinates: 52°16′53″N 112°08′52″W
- Country: Canada
- Province: Alberta
- Region: Central Alberta
- Census division: 7
- Municipal district: County of Paintearth No. 18
- Incorporated (village): February 10, 1912
- Dissolved (hamlet): January 1, 2025

Government
  - Governing body: County of Paintearth No. 18 Council
  - MP: Pierre Poilievre
  - MLA: Nate Horner

Area (2021)
  - Land: 0.61 km^{2} (0.24 sq mi)
- Elevation: 835 m (2,740 ft)

Population (2021)
  - Total: 92
  - Density: 151.9/km^{2} (393/sq mi)
- Time zone: UTC−06:00 (Alberta Time)
- Postal code: T0C 1M0
- Area code: 403
- Highways: Highway 12
- Website: Official website

Halkirk is a hamlet in central Alberta, Canada within the County of Paintearth No. 18. It was incorporated as a village prior to 2025. Halkirk is 122 kilometres (76 mi) east of Red Deer at the intersection of Highway 12 and Highway 855.

== History ==
Halkirk was named after Halkirk, Scotland. It was incorporated as a village on February 10, 1912. Following a vote in October 2024, the Village of Halkirk dissolved on January 1, 2025, becoming a hamlet under the jurisdiction of the County of Paintearth No. 18.

== Geography ==
Halkirk is located in an area surrounded by prairies, farmland, and badlands.

== Demographics ==
In the 2021 Census of Population conducted by Statistics Canada, the Village of Halkirk had a population of 92 living in 50 of its 58 total private dwellings, a change of −17.9% from its 2016 population of 112. With a land area of 0.61 km^{2} (0.24 sq mi), it had a population density of 150.8/km^{2} (390.6/sq mi) in 2021.

In the 2016 Census of Population conducted by Statistics Canada, the Village of Halkirk recorded a population of 112 living in 55 of its 56 total private dwellings, a −7.4% change from its 2011 population of 121. With a land area of 0.61 km^{2} (0.24 sq mi), it had a population density of 183.6/km^{2} (475.5/sq mi) in 2016.

== Economy ==
Halkirk is within an agricultural region that yields a cross-section of products. In addition, there are several industrial operations located near Halkirk, including a mining operation, a power generating station, and oilfield support services among others. With commercial operations beginning on December 1, 2012, Capital Power Corporation operates Alberta's third largest wind farm (largest until May 2013, when the Blackspring projects reached full operation), with 83 Vestas V90 Wind Turbines in the area totalling 150MW capacity.

== Education ==
Halkirk was home to the Mother Teresa Halkirk Catholic School until March 2016, when the East Central Alberta Catholic Separate School Board decided to close it indefinitely due to a decline in student numbers.

== Notable people ==
- Shane Doan - former professional hockey player with the Arizona Coyotes

== See also ==
- List of communities in Alberta
- List of hamlets in Alberta
