= Cereal, Alberta =

Cereal
- Hamlet
- Hamlet of Cereal
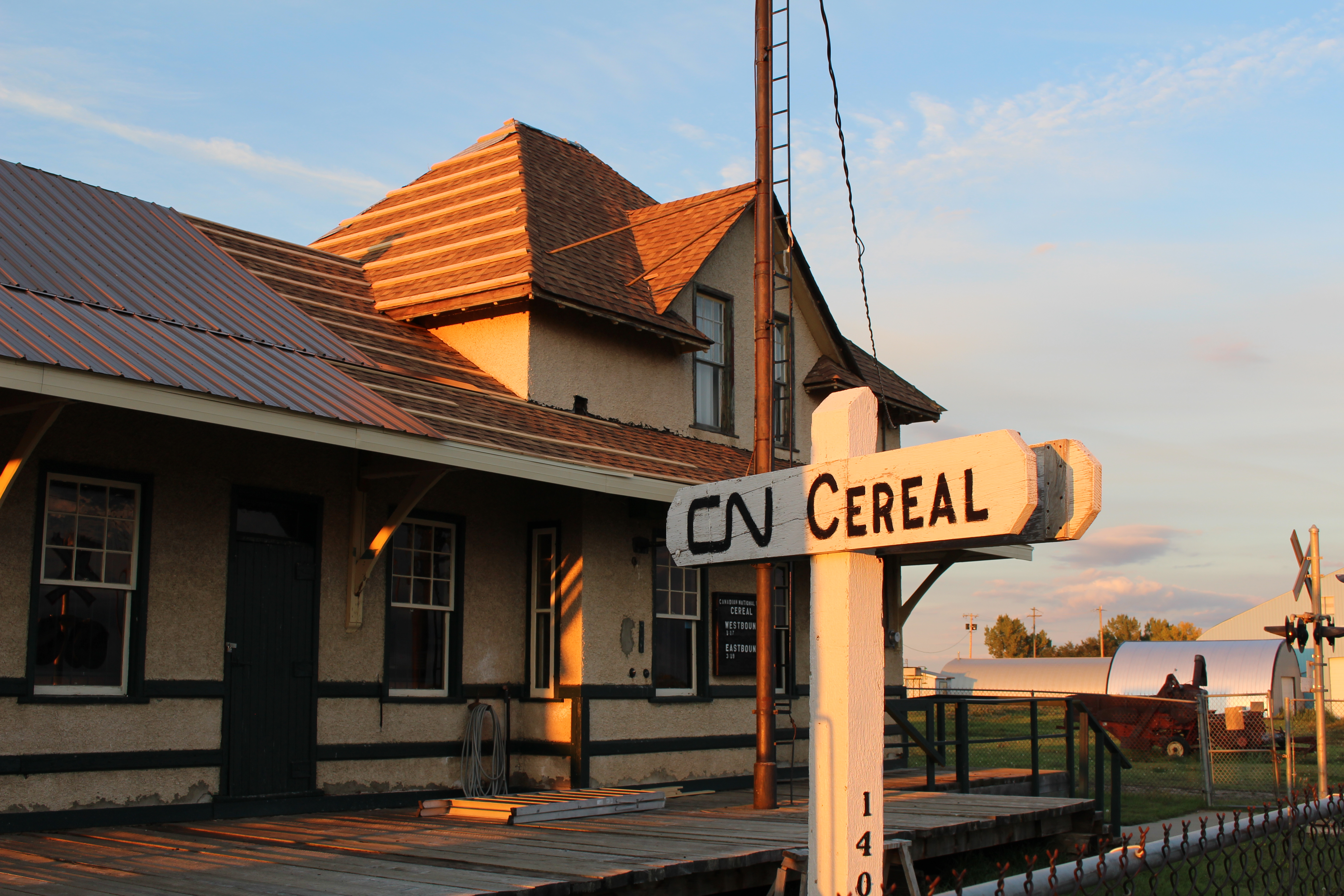

- Location in Alberta
- Coordinates: 51°24′56.1″N 110°47′59.5″W
- Country: Canada
- Province: Alberta
- Region: Central Alberta
- Census division: 4
- Special Area: No. 3
- Incorporated
  - Village: August 19, 1914
- Dissolved: January 1, 2021

Government
  - Governing body: Special Areas Board

Area (2016)
  - Land: 0.79 km^{2} (0.31 sq mi)
- Elevation: 765 m (2,510 ft)

Population (2016)
  - Total: 111
  - Density: 140.9/km^{2} (365/sq mi)
- Time zone: UTC−06:00 (Alberta Time)
- Highways: Highway 9 Highway 886

Cereal is a hamlet within Special Area No. 3 in central Alberta, Canada. It is approximately 161 km (100 mi) east of Drumheller. It was named after the post office that was established in the area in 1910. The name of the post office alluded to grain fields near the community. Cereal held village status prior to 2021.

== History ==
Cereal incorporated as a village on August 19, 1914. It relinquished its village status on January 1, 2021, when it dissolved to become a hamlet under the jurisdiction of Special Area No. 3.

== Demographics ==
In the 2016 Census of Population conducted by Statistics Canada, Cereal recorded a population of 111 living in 59 of its 63 total private dwellings, a −17.2% change from its 2011 population of 134. With a land area of 0.79 km^{2} (0.31 sq mi), it had a population density of 140.5/km^{2} (363.9/sq mi) in 2016.

In the 2011 Census, Cereal had a population of 134 living in 71 of its 79 total dwellings, a 6.3% change from its 2006 population of 126. With a land area of 0.95 km^{2} (0.37 sq mi), it had a population density of 141.1/km^{2} (365.3/sq mi) in 2011.

== Notable people ==
- Debby Carlson, Canadian politician, Liberal MLA (1993–2004)
- Marlene Streit, amateur golfer — won the Australian, British, Canadian and U.S. Women's Amateurs

== See also ==
- List of communities in Alberta
- List of hamlets in Alberta
