= Bentley, Alberta =

Bentley
- Town
- Town of Bentley
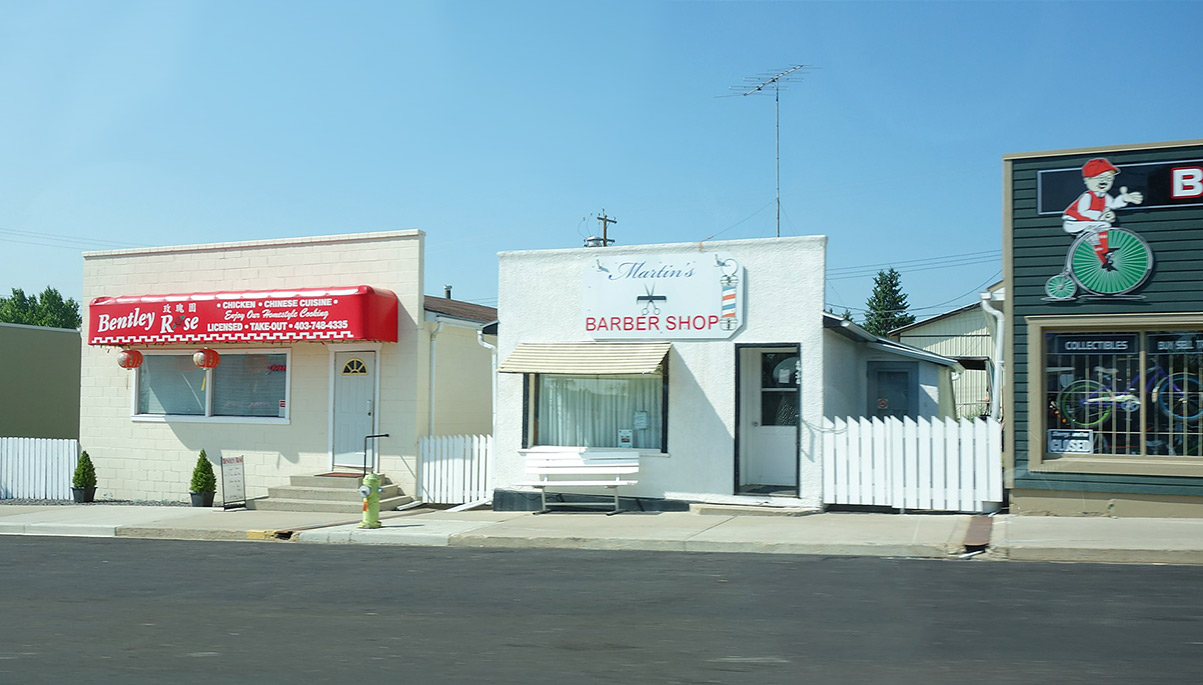
- Shops in Bentley

- Location of Bentley in Alberta
- Coordinates: 52°27′54″N 114°02′59″W
- Country: Canada
- Province: Alberta
- Region: Central Alberta
- Census division: 8
- Municipal district: Lacombe County
- Incorporated
  - Village: March 17, 1915
  - Town: January 1, 2001

Government
  - Mayor: Pam Hansen
  - Governing body: Bentley Town Council
  - MP: Jason Nixon

Area (2021)
  - Land: 2.24 km^{2} (0.86 sq mi)
- Elevation: 910 m (2,990 ft)

Population (2021)
  - Total: 1,042
  - Density: 464.4/km^{2} (1,203/sq mi)
- Time zone: UTC−06:00 (Alberta Time)
- Postal code span: T0C 0J0
- Area code: 403
- Highways: Highway 20; Highway 12
- Waterway: Blindman River; Gull Lake
- Website: www.townofbentley.ca

Bentley is a town in central Alberta, Canada within Lacombe County. It is located on Highway 12, approximately 28 km (17 mi) northwest of Red Deer.

== History ==
The first settlers came from the U.S. in 1888-1890 and either walked or drove oxen from Lacombe, which was the closest railroad station at that time. The post office opened in 1901. The first church was built in 1890 by the Methodists, and a schoolhouse was built in 1903. Bentley was incorporated as a village on March 17, 1915.

A disastrous fire destroyed all buildings on the south side of the community in 1916. The centre roadway was made 36 metres (118 ft) wide and new buildings could not be constructed inside that area. In 1930, a centre boulevard was constructed for fire protection and street lights installed.

A fire in December 2022 destroyed the town's famous grain elevator. Another fire burned down the local bar, the 'Monkey Top Saloon' on January 16, 2024. There are currently plans to rebuild it.

Bentley was incorporated as a town on January 1, 2001.

=== Town name ===
Bentley was named in honour of George Bentley, an early homesteader and sawyer, however at the time it was a controversial choice. When Major William B. McPherson, a U.S. Civil War veteran, opened a post office, settlers preferred McPherson's name, but they were outnumbered by the sawmill employees, who wanted Bentley. Prior to 1915, a petition was formed regarding the naming of the village. The original names of Oxford and Springdale were turned down as these two names had been frequently used across Canada.

== Demographics ==
In the 2021 Census of Population conducted by Statistics Canada, the Town of Bentley had a population of 1,042 living in 451 of its 471 total private dwellings, a change of −3.3% from its 2016 population of 1,078. With a land area of 2.24 km^{2} (0.86 sq mi), it had a population density of 465.2/km^{2} (1,204.8/sq mi) in 2021.

In the 2016 Census of Population conducted by Statistics Canada, the Town of Bentley recorded a population of 1,078 living in 441 of its 463 total private dwellings, a 0.5% change from its 2011 population of 1,073. With a land area of 2.24 km^{2} (0.86 sq mi), it had a population density of 481.3/km^{2} (1,246.4/sq mi) in 2016.

== Education ==
Bentley has one public school, Bentley School (Pre-K to grade 12), administered by Wolf Creek Public Schools.

== Notable people ==
- Dick Damron, country music singer, songwriter.
- Perry Turnbull, former NHL player with the St. Louis Blues and ice hockey coach
- Clayton Beddoes, former NHL player with the Boston Bruins and ice hockey coach

== See also ==
- List of communities in Alberta
- List of towns in Alberta
