= Leslieville, Alberta =

Leslieville
- Hamlet
- Location of Leslieville in Alberta
- Coordinates: 52.3833°N 114.6047°W
- Country: Canada
- Province: Alberta
- Census division: No. 9
- Municipal district: Clearwater County

Government
  - Type: Unincorporated
  - Reeve: John Vandermeer
  - Governing body: Clearwater County Council: Jim Duncan; Timothy Hoven; Theresa Laing; Cammie Laird; Daryl Lougheed; Michelle Swanson; John Vandermeer

Area (2021)
  - Land: 0.52 km^{2} (0.20 sq mi)
- Elevation: 965 m (3,166 ft)

Population (2021)
  - Total: 134
  - Density: 257.9/km^{2} (668/sq mi)
- Time zone: UTC−06:00 (Alberta Time)

Leslieville is a hamlet in Alberta, Canada within Clearwater County. It is located east of Rocky Mountain House along the Canadian National Railway and has an elevation of 965 metres (3,166 ft).

The hamlet is located in Census Division No. 9 and in the federal riding of Wetaskiwin. It was first settled in 1903.

== Demographics ==
Population history of Leslieville
| Year | Pop. | ±% |
|---|---|---|
| 1941 | 113 | — |
| 1951 | 137 | +21.2% |
| 1956 | 152 | +10.9% |
| 1961 | 178 | +17.1% |
| 1966 | 172 | −3.4% |
| 1971 | 159 | −7.6% |
| 1976 | 132 | −17.0% |
| 1981 | 148 | +12.1% |
| 1986 | 168 | +13.5% |
| 1991 | 137 | −18.5% |
| 1991A | 143 | +4.4% |
| 1996 | 147 | +2.8% |
| 2001 | 206 | +40.1% |
| 2006 | 232 | +12.6% |
| 2011 | 239 | +3.0% |
| 2016 | 238 | −0.4% |
| 2016R | 151 | −36.6% |
| 2021 | 134 | −11.3% |
Source: Statistics Canada

In the 2021 Census of Population conducted by Statistics Canada, Leslieville had a population of 134 living in 60 of its 64 total private dwellings, a change of −11.3% from its 2016 population of 151. With a land area of 0.52 km^{2} (0.20 sq mi), it had a population density of 257.7/km^{2} (667.4/sq mi) in 2021.

As a designated place in the 2016 Census of Population conducted by Statistics Canada, Leslieville had a population of 238 living in 90 of its 96 total private dwellings, a change of −0.4% from its 2011 population of 239. With a land area of 2.26 km^{2} (0.87 sq mi), it had a population density of 105.3/km^{2} (272.8/sq mi) in 2016.

== See also ==
- List of communities in Alberta
- List of designated places in Alberta
- List of hamlets in Alberta
