= Alix, Alberta =

Alix
- Village
- Village of Alix
- Location within Lacombe County

- Location within Alberta
- Coordinates: 51°29′59″N 113°29′53″W
- Country: Canada
- Province: Alberta
- Region: Central Alberta
- Census division: 8
- Municipal district: Lacombe County
- Incorporated
  - Village: June 3, 1907

Government
  - Mayor: Robert L Fehr
  - Governing body: Alix Village Council
  - MP: Blaine Calkins

Area (2021)
  - Land: 3.11 km^{2} (1.20 sq mi)
- Elevation: 895 m (2,936 ft)

Population (2021)
  - Total: 774
  - Density: 248.9/km^{2} (645/sq mi)
- Time zone: UTC−06:00 (Alberta Time)
- Highways: Highway 12; Highway 601
- Website: Official website

Alix is a village in central Alberta, Canada that is northeast of Red Deer. Its village mascot is the Alix-Gator, who is featured prominently on many signs and businesses.

== History ==
Originally, the settlement was called Toddsville after Joseph Todd. When the settlement was incorporated on June 3, 1907, it was named after Alexia Westhead, the first white woman settler of the community. (Alix was her nickname.) The first mayor of Alix was Robert F. Sanderson, who also owned and ran the general store.

Alix Westhead was friends with Irene Marryat and invited her to come for a visit in 1896. After meeting local farmer/Oxford graduate Walter Parlby, Irene became Mrs. Parlby and Alix became her new home. Irene Parlby was later one of the "Famous Five."

Irene Parlby's public life may be said to have begun in 1913 when she was chosen as secretary of the Alix Country Women's Club. Her public role greatly expanded when she was elected President of the United Farmers of Alberta's (UFA) Women's Auxiliary. She was the local MLA from 1921 to 1935. Her political life reached its greatest point when she was appointed a cabinet minister when the UFA formed the government of Alberta in 1921, a position she held for 14 years. She was awarded an honorary Doctor of Laws degree from the University of Alberta in 1935. In 2009, after their deaths Parlby and the other members of the Famous Five were appointed honorary senators.

== Demographics ==
In the 2021 Census of Population conducted by Statistics Canada, the Village of Alix had a population of 774 living in 343 of its 385 total private dwellings, a change of 5.4% from its 2016 population of 734. With a land area of 3.11 km^{2} (1.20 sq mi), it had a population density of 248.9/km^{2} (644.6/sq mi) in 2021.

In the 2016 Census of Population conducted by Statistics Canada, the Village of Alix recorded a population of 734 living in 343 of its 385 total private dwellings, a change of −11.6% from its 2011 population of 830. With a land area of 3.13 km^{2} (1.21 sq mi), it had a population density of 234.5/km^{2} (607.4/sq mi) in 2016.

== See also ==
- List of communities in Alberta
- List of villages in Alberta
