= Lacombe County =

Municipal district in Alberta, Canada

- Municipal district

- Location within Alberta
- Country: Canada
- Province: Alberta
- Region: Central Alberta
- Census division: 8
- Established: 1944
- Incorporated: 1995

Government
  - Reeve: Barb Shepherd
  - Governing body: Lacombe County Council: Brenda Knight; Dana Kreil; Barb Shepherd; John Ireland; Allan Wilson; Dwayne West; Ken Weenink
  - MP: Blaine Calkins
  - Administrative office: west of Lacombe

Area (2021)
  - Land: 2,759.12 km^{2} (1,065.30 sq mi)

Population (2021)
  - Total: 10,283
  - Density: 3.7/km^{2} (9.6/sq mi)
- Time zone: UTC−06:00 (Alberta Time)
- Website: lacombecounty.com

Lacombe County is a municipal district in southern Alberta, Canada. It is within Census Division No. 8 north of the City of Red Deer. Its municipal office is 4 km (2.5 mi) west of Highway 2 and the City of Lacombe, and 6 km (3.7 mi) east of the Summer Village of Gull Lake, at the intersection of Highway 12 and Spruceville Road (Range Road 274).

== Geography ==
=== Communities and localities ===
The following urban municipalities are surrounded by Lacombe County.

Cities

- Lacombe

Towns

- Bentley
- Blackfalds
- Eckville

Villages

- Alix
- Clive

Summer villages

- Birchcliff
- Gull Lake
- Half Moon Bay
- Sunbreaker Cove

The following hamlets are located within Lacombe County.

Hamlets

- Haynes
- Joffre
- Mirror (dissolved from village status)
- Morningside
- Tees

The following localities are located within Lacombe County.

Localities

- Alix South Junction
- Aspen Beach
- Birch Bay
- Brighton Beach
- Brook
- Bullocksville
- Burbank
- Chigwell
- Coghill

- Deer Ridge Estates
- Delaney
- Ebeling Beach
- Farrant
- Forshee
- Gilby
- Heatburg
- Hespero
- Jackson

- June
- Kasha
- Kootuk
- Kuusamo Krest
- Lamerton
- Lochinvar
- Lockhart
- McLaurin Beach

- New Saratoga Beach
- PBI
- Prentiss
- Rosedale
- Rosedale Valley
- The Breakers
- Wilson Beach
- Woody Nook

== Demographics ==
In the 2021 Census of Population conducted by Statistics Canada, Lacombe County had a population of 10,283 living in 3,973 of its 4,616 total private dwellings, a change of −0.6% from its 2016 population of 10,343. With a land area of 2,759.12 km^{2} (1,065.30 sq mi), it had a population density of 3.7/km^{2} (9.7/sq mi) in 2021.

In the 2016 Census of Population conducted by Statistics Canada, Lacombe County had a population of 10,343 living in 3,890 of its 4,668 total private dwellings, a 0.3% change from its 2011 population of 10,307. With a land area of 2,765.16 km^{2} (1,067.63 sq mi), it had a population density of 3.7/km^{2} (9.7/sq mi) in 2016.

== See also ==
- List of communities in Alberta
- List of municipal districts in Alberta
