= Rochon =

Rochon may refer to:

== People ==
- Charles Rochon (1673 - 1733) Founder of Mobile, Alabama
- Rosette Rochon (1766 - 1863) Free woman of color, real estate investor
- Gilbert L. Rochon, 6th president of Tuskegee University
- Stephen W. Rochon, former Director of the Executive Residence and White House Chief Usher
- Victor Rochon, member of the Louisiana House of Representatives, great-grandfather of Valerie Jarrett
- Henri Rochon (1924–2005), Canadian national tennis champion
- Debbie Rochon (born 1968), Canadian actress, known for independent horror movies and counter-culture film
- Jean Rochon (1938–2021), Canadian politician
- John Rochon, Canadian shooter
- Lela Rochon, American actress
- Alexis-Marie de Rochon, French astronomer

== Places ==
- Rochon Sands, a summer village on Buffalo Lake in central Alberta, Canada
  - Rochon Sands Provincial Park, a provincial park near the summer village
