= White Sands, Alberta =

White Sands
- Summer village
- Summer Village of White Sands
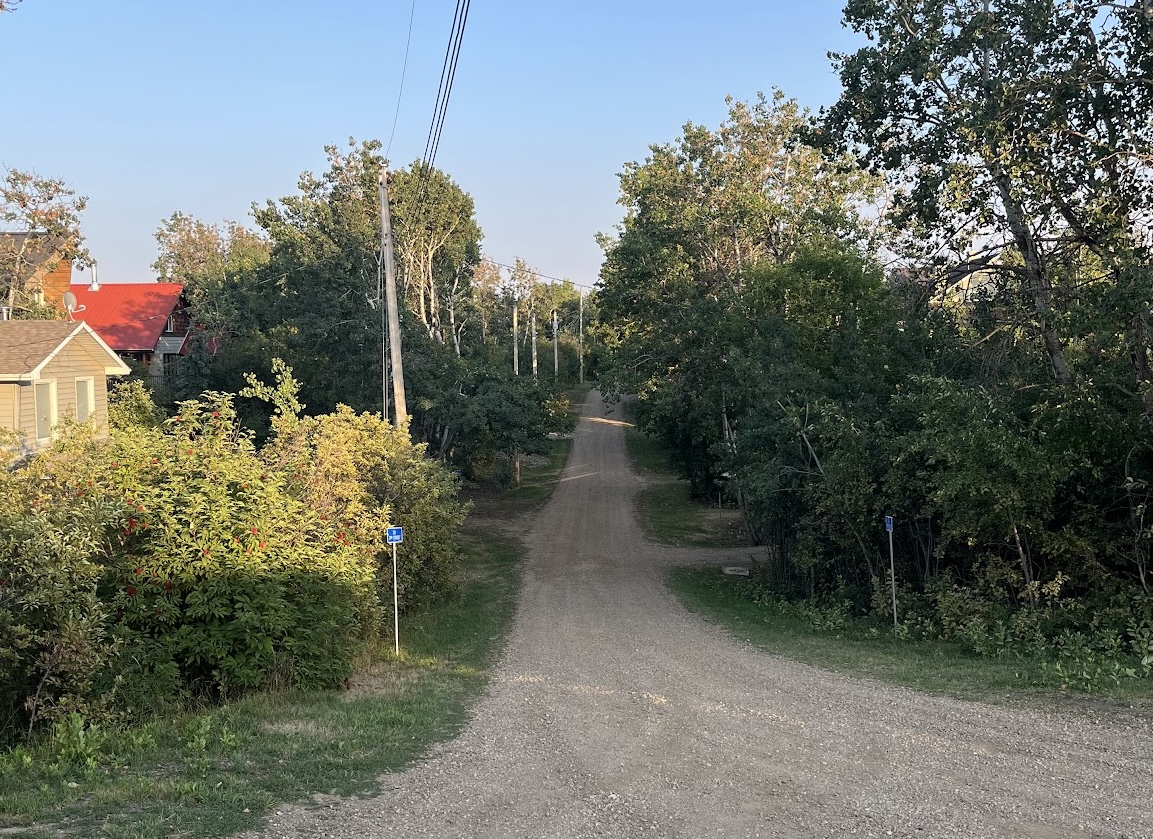
- Lakeview Ave and 2nd Street in White Sands

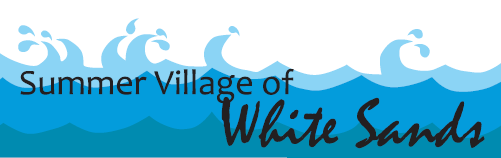
- Logo

- Location of White Sands in Alberta
- Coordinates: 52.46667°N 112.81663°W
- Country: Canada
- Province: Alberta
- Census division: No. 7
- Incorporated: January 01, 1980

Government
  - Type: Municipal incorporation
  - Mayor: Lorne Thurston
  - Governing body: White Sands Summer Village Council

Area (2021)
  - Land: 1.61 km^{2} (0.62 sq mi)

Population (2021)
  - Total: 174
  - Density: 108.1/km^{2} (280/sq mi)
- Time zone: UTC−06:00 (Alberta Time)
- Website: Official website

White Sands is a summer village in Alberta, Canada. It is located on the southeast shore of Buffalo Lake, northwest from the Town of Stettler and east of the Summer Village of Rochon Sands and Rochon Sands Provincial Park.

The summer village is within the municipal boundaries of the County of Stettler No. 6.

== Demographics ==
In the 2021 Census of Population conducted by Statistics Canada, the Summer Village of White Sands had a population of 174 living in 82 of its 304 total private dwellings, a change of 45% from its 2016 population of 120. With a land area of 1.61 km^{2} (0.62 sq mi), it had a population density of 108.1/km^{2} (279.9/sq mi) in 2021.

In the 2016 Census of Population conducted by Statistics Canada, the Summer Village of White Sands had a population of 120 living in 59 of its 253 total private dwellings, a 31.9% change from its 2011 population of 91. With a land area of 1.58 km^{2} (0.61 sq mi), it had a population density of 75.9/km^{2} (196.7/sq mi) in 2016.

== See also ==
- List of communities in Alberta
- List of francophone communities in Alberta
- List of summer villages in Alberta
- List of resort villages in Saskatchewan
