= Zabeau Bellanton =

Elisabeth "Zabeau" Bellanton (c. 1751 – after 1782), was a slave trader. She is known to have been the most successful business woman in the French colony of Saint Domingue prior to the Haitian Revolution.

== Life ==
Zabeau Bellanton's background is largely unknown. She lived in Cap-Haïtien and was listed as a mulatresse, a free woman of color. Her father was unknown, and although she had a daughter listed to be a quarteronne, no lover or spouse is known, and the daughter bore the name Bellanton.

Zabeau Bellanton was the most successful businesswoman in the colony, somewhat unusual for both her gender and race. While the free people of color often engaged in business, and the Gens de couleur in Saint Domingue was particularly known as the most wealthy in the Caribbean, the number of truly wealthy free colored were nevertheless small. While it was unusual for white women to engage in business, it was common for free women of color to do so: Two-hirds of the clients of color appearing before the notaries in Cap-Haïtien or Port-au-Prince to buy or sell property in 1776-89 were women. However, only three of them — Bellanton, Jeanne-Genevieve Deslandes of Port-au-Prince, and Anne Rossignol of Cap-Francais — were counted as truly wealthy.

In Saint Domingue, it was very common for free women of color to become a kept mistress of a white man who, when he died or left to settle in France, left her with money or property, enabling their former mistresses to support themselves as business women, and most colored business women had this background. Bellanton was unusual in the sense that she, as far as it was known, started and developed her business by herself rather than on money left to her by a former white lover.

=== Business activity ===
She was officially listed in the notarial acts as a confiseuse (Jam - or jelly maker), but was in reality engaged in slave trade, and invested the profit of her slave trade in urban real estate.

Her business was to buy the cheapest of the bossale, slaves directly from the slave ship from Africa, slaves which had a low price because of their young age or health condition; she then rented them out by pawning them for a fraction of their value for a period of some months, until they were healthy enough for her to find a buyer, after which she would take them back and sell them. This method ensured that should the slaves die before she could sell them, she would lose only the small difference of the payment upon the time of the pawn, and the small purchase price. During the American Revolutionary War, she also bought illegally from smuggling British slave ships, and she also had contacts with the slave traders in Martinique.

Officially, she had no business partner aside from her procureur or business manager Justin Viart, but in reality, she seem to have had unofficial business partners who invested in her activity, even white partners. She is known to have paid Jean Baptiste Le Sueur Fontaine for a "loan" of 13884 livres, which was likely in reality his share of profit for investing in her business.

Her business method was regarded to be immoral even in the contemporary slave economy of Saint Domingue, but it was enormously lucrative and gave her a standard in class with the white planters. She invested her profit in urban real estate and owned several houses in Cap-Francais, one of them worth 18000 livres, and six slaves for her personal use.

=== Later life ===
In 1782, Zabeau Bellanton left Saint Domingue for France, which was common for the elite in Saint Domingue, who often left the colony to settle in France when they could afford to do so.

Before her departure she left a will in which her fortune is evident: she left real property worth 1500 livres to her godmother in usufruits; 3000 livres to the priest of the parish of Le Cap to be distributed to poor white and free colored; 132 livres as a monthly allowance to her mother; and 2000 livres and 10 percent of her real estate to her business manager Viart, with a power of attorney to manage the affairs of her daughter until she became an adult.

== See also ==
- Julie Dahey
- Simone Brocard
