= Samuel R. Scottron =

American inventor (1841–1908)

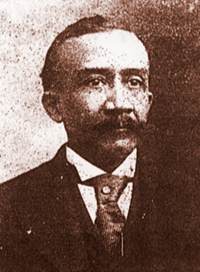
- Scottron
- Born: Samuel Raymond Scottron c. 1841; Philadelphia, Pennsylvania, U.S.
- Died: October 14, 1908 (aged 66–67); Brooklyn, New York City, U.S.
- Other name: S. R. Scottron
- Education: Cooper Union
- Occupations: Inventor, businessman, merchant, barber
- Political party: Republican
- Spouse: Anna Maria Willett (m. 1902)
- Children: 6

Samuel Raymond Scottron (c. February 1841 – October 14, 1908) was an African-American inventor, merchant, and businessman. He received six patents throughout his career for inventions including an improved mirror, a curtain rod, a supporting bracket, a pole tip, and two designs for window cornices. Scottron lived in Brooklyn, New York City.

== Life and career ==
Samuel Scottron was born free in c. 1841, in Philadelphia, and moved as a child with his family to New York City. However various sources have discrepancies in around his date of birth and place of birth. He completed grammar school when he was 14 years old, and later received his engineering degree from Cooper Union in 1878.

During the American Civil War, Scottron was the sutler for the 3rd United States Colored Infantry, and almost went bankrupt. To recoup his finances, he operated grocery stores in Gainesville and Jacksonville, Florida, and then a barber shop in Springfield, Massachusetts, where his parents were originally from.

Scottron served on the Brooklyn Board of Education as the only black member, and was a leader in the Republican Party. He advocated for the abolition of slavery in Cuba and Puerto Rico. Scottron served as a founding member and leader of the Cuban Anti-Slavery Committee.

A chapter in the book The Negro in Business (1907) by Booker T. Washington is about Scottron.

== Family ==
Scottron married Anna Maria Willett, a New Yorker, in 1863; they had six children.

Scottron died at the age of 67 on October 14, 1908, of natural causes in his home in Brooklyn.

== Inventions ==
- U.S. patent 76,253 Improved Mirror, March 31, 1868
- U.S. patent 224,732 Adjustable Window Cornice, February 17, 1880
- U.S. patent 270,851 Cornice, January 16, 1883
- U.S. patent 349,525 Pole Tip, September 21, 1886
- U.S. patent 481,720 Curtain Rod, August 30, 1892
- U.S. patent 505,008 Supporting Bracket, September 12, 1893

== Publications ==
- Scottron, Samuel R. (October 1904). "Manufacturing Household Items". The Colored American Magazine. No. 7. pp. 621–624.
