= Cuban Anti-Slavery Committee =

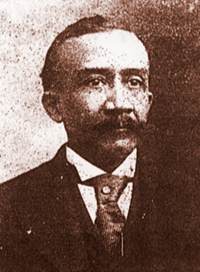
Samuel R Scottron, President of the Cuban Anti-Slavery Committee

As a result of the emancipation of slavery in the United States, African Americans sought to challenge slavery in other parts of the hemisphere notably Cuba, and were frustrated by the decision of President Ulysses S. Grant to take a neutral approach towards the ongoing revolution in Cuba that was fought to overthrow slavery in the Spanish territory. Aware of the multiple Cuban exile revolutionary and political clubs organized by Cubans in New York during the nineteenth century, in 1872 African American men organized a club in support of ending slavery in Cuba and gain official recognition from the United States that the insurgents were legitimate belligerents. As a result, the Cuban Anti-Slavery Committee first convened in December 1872 at the Cooper Institute in New York City. Samuel R. Scottron led the Committee and organized the event, while the Reverend Henry Highland Garnet served as the Committee's secretary and keynote speaker.

== Historical Background ==
In 1868, abolitionist sentiment and dissatisfaction with the administration of Madrid erupted into a civil war in Cuba. Known as the Ten Years' War, it raged from 1868 to 1878 and saw Cuban insurgents pitted against Spanish colonial forces in a contest for, among other things, Cuban independence and the abolition of Cuban slavery. The United States, which had recently experienced its own Civil War and abolition of slavery, represented a potential ally of the Cuban insurgency. The Ten Years' War led to the migration of a number of Cuban exiles insurgency leaders, expatriates, and anti-slavery activists who arrived in mainly New York and Florida to advocate for American intervention in the conflict.

The Grant administration was divided on whether or not to intervene. Secretary of War John Rawlins supported intervention in Cuba, as did Daniel Sickles, ambassador to Spain. President Grant himself was sympathetic to the cause of the insurgents. However, others within American politics, particularly Secretary of State Hamilton Fish, were more skeptical of intervention. They considered it imprudent to intervene so soon after the American Civil War, they thought American intervention on Cuba's behalf would put America in a difficult diplomatic situation, and they were cynical regarding American race relations and the ability of the Cuban people to govern themselves. Consequently, President Grant offered to serve as an intermediary between Madrid and the Cuban insurgents under certain conditions, including the concession of Cuban independence and abolition of Cuban slavery. Beyond this offer, the United States did not interfere.

== Beginnings ==
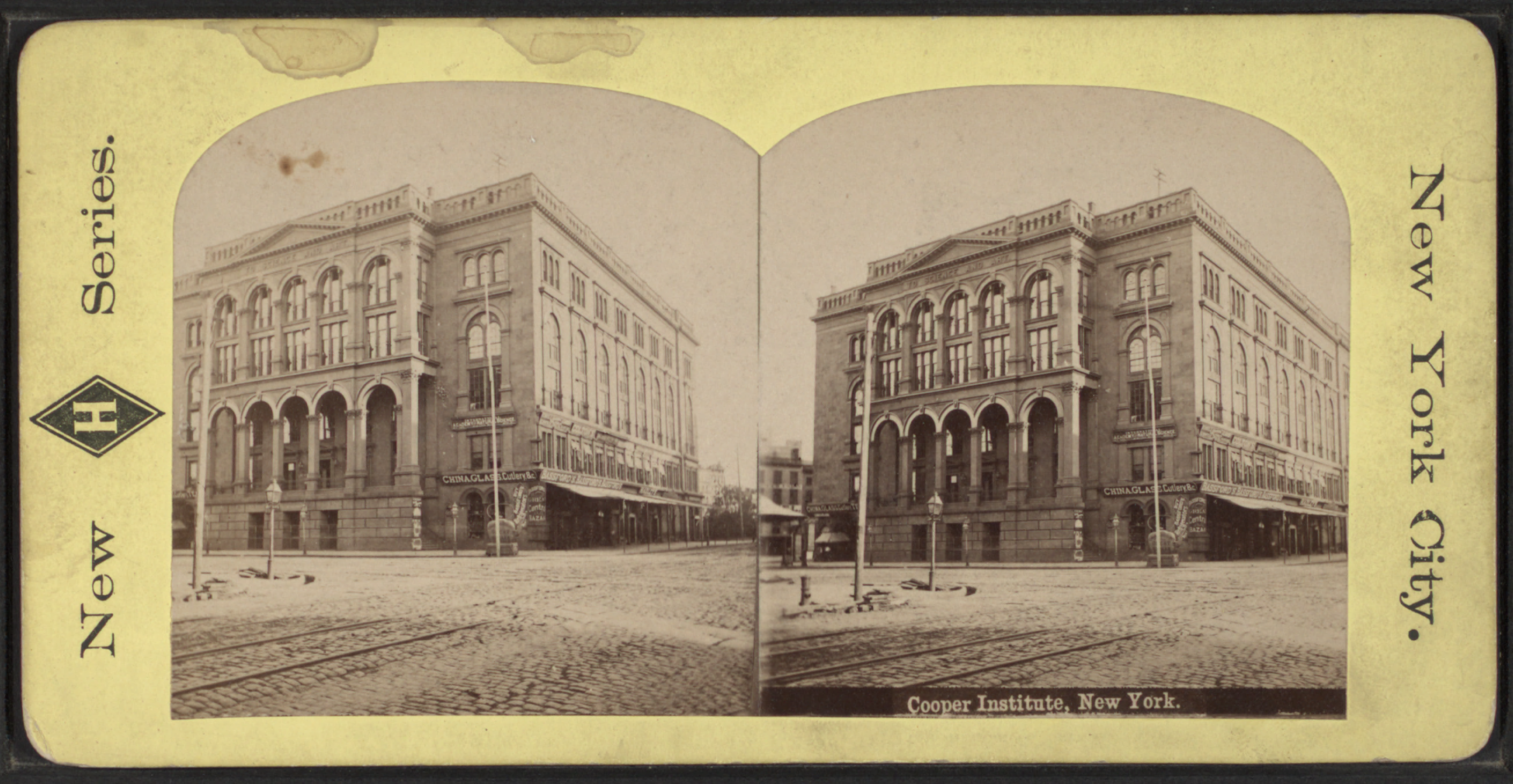
The Cooper Institute in New York, location of the first meeting of the Cuban Anti-Slavery Committee

Fueled by witnessing many former slaves escaping from Cuba amidst the ongoing situation and making their way to the United States, Henry Highland Garnet and others formed the Cuban Anti-Slavery Committee. Garnet and others were quick to support the movement in Cuba because the Cuban independence movement was multi-racial, a model that they hoped to adopt in the United States. The first meeting was held at the Cooper Institute in Manhattan. Shortly thereafter, another meeting was held in Boston.

The first meeting was attended by mostly African American men and some Cuban exiles. In addition to the attendants, reporters, local politicians, leaders, and other individuals that were present ensured that the gathering was widely publicized. Garnet gave the keynote address in the Great Hall of the Institute, and it was greatly enjoyed by those present. The meeting resulted in the creation of the Committee, whose goal was to gather signatures across the country in support of Cuban abolitionism. Accordingly, future meetings were planned in many cities, including Boston, Philadelphia, Baltimore, San Francisco, and Washington D.C. The signature campaign was also accompanied with an educational campaign. Also see

== Purpose ==
The Committee was originally convened in order to gather support for a pressure campaign in favor of United States recognition of, and support for, the Cuban belligerents from the perspective of African American men. Its founding members considered the war in Cuba to be a war against slavery and Old World colonialism with ramifications for the entire hemisphere. Given the multiracial makeup of the insurgent forces, they also viewed it as a model for interracial cooperation and equality in the United States.

A large motivating factor for Committee members was the belief that championing abolition movements abroad would bring more racial equality at home. Despite their recent freedom from slavery, African American individuals remained oppressed, excluded and segregated. Because of this, they often felt like their victories were incomplete. Winning more civil liberty victories abroad would help set a powerful precedence for civil conduct within the United States. African Americans also felt that it was the country's inherent duty to fight for abolition abroad, based on the principles found in the Emancipation Proclamation.

Reverend Garnet's activity with the organization, in particular, was dedicated to advancing the proposition that slavery was not defeated until it was defeated everywhere, that the African American activist's work was not done until slavery was eradicated from the Americas. In this light, the Cuban revolution represented a continuation of the abolition efforts that were so recently successful in the United States.

== Prominent Members ==
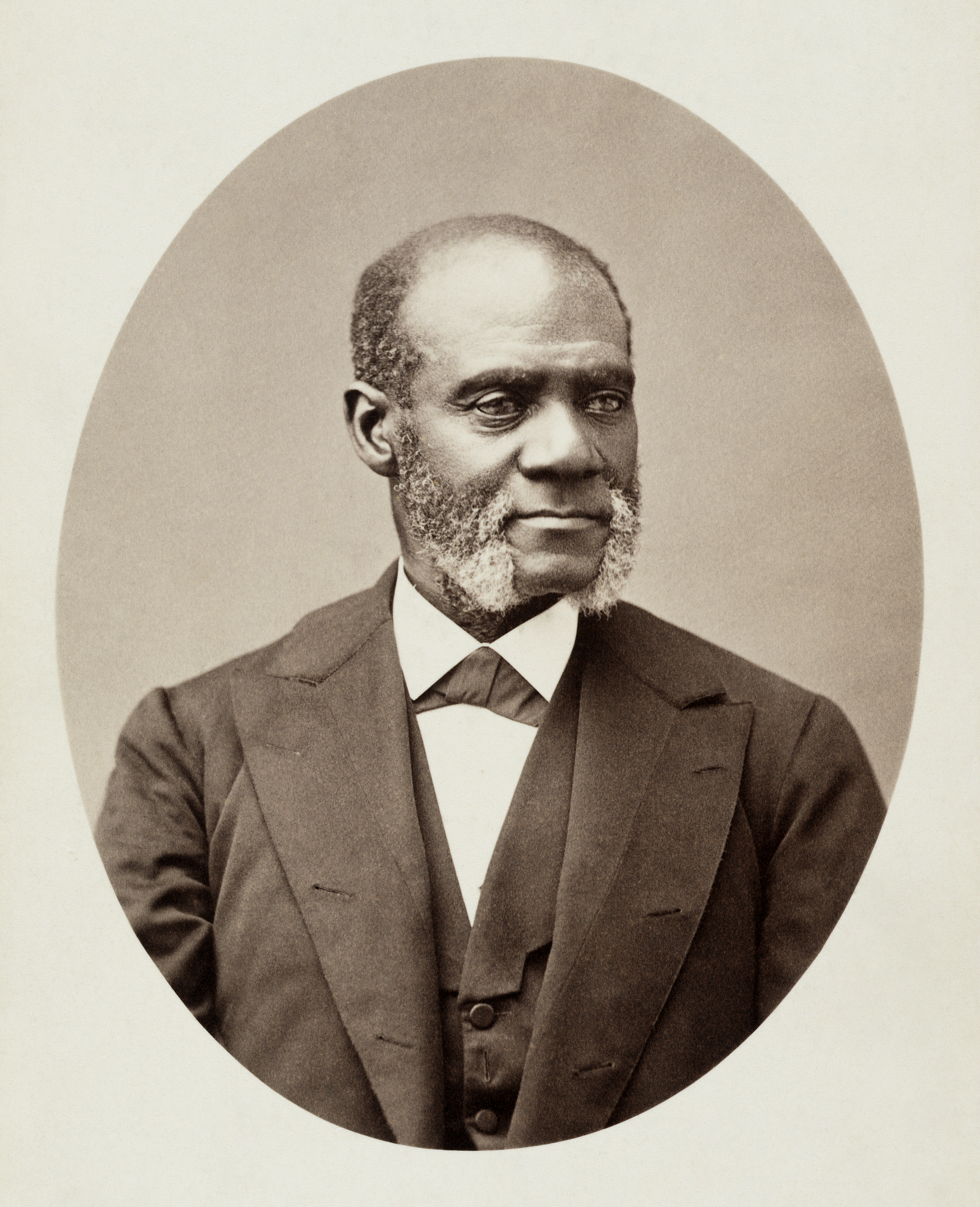
Henry Highland Garnet, Secretary of the Cuban Anti-Slavery Committee

Samuel Raymond Scottron was a founding member and leader of the Committee. Scottron, born around 1843, was a prominent member of the African American community in New York City and is most well known for inventing the curtain rod. He was heavily involved in civil rights causes throughout his life up until his death on October 14, 1908.

Henry Highland Garnet was the secretary of the Committee and one of its founding members. A former slave, he was born on December 23, 1815, and grew up in New York City after obtaining his freedom with his family. Garnet graduated from the Oneida Institute in 1840 and became a Presbyterian minister. He died on February 12, 1882, while serving as the United States Minister and Counsel General to Liberia. His entire life was filled with action towards overcoming racial inequalities, both in the United States and abroad.

P.B.S. Pinchback was another important leader of the Committee. He served for the Union Army during the Civil War and became the United States' first African American governor when he served as the governor of Louisiana.

== Political Efforts ==
A week before meeting with the President, Scottron held a meeting in Baltimore at the Madison Street (Colored) Presbyterian Church. At the meeting, he continued to collect signatures for the Committee's presentation to Congress. The meeting in Baltimore was also significant because it had a large attendance from local women, a sign of equality within the movement.

Garnet and others from the Committee presented an unknown number of signatures, estimated to be in the several thousands, from the meetings in New York and elsewhere to President Grant and Congress. President Grant had a meeting with the delegation from the Committee, but after consultation with his cabinet, no action was taken from the Grant administration, much to the dismay of Garnet and the rest of the Committee.

Other members of the delegation to the White House included Scottron, George Downing, and J.M. Langston. It is possible the petition exceeded 5,000 names and had grown into the tens of thousands.

The petition from the Committee sought for the United States Government to grant recognition to the rebels leading the independence movement in Cuba. While at the White House, Henry Turner, a member of the Committee, made it clear that the at least 5,000 names on the petition were ready to join forces with the Cuban rebels in seeking to overthrow Spain and abolish slavery in the region.

The petition presented to President Grant spurred a larger movement across the country, amassing signatures estimated anywhere from tens of thousands to half a million. Events were held in Sacramento, San Francisco, Virginia City (Nevada), New Orleans, Boston, Philadelphia, New York, Washington D.C., and more.

The Committee felt that since the independence movement in Cuba had been going on for four years, the rebels deserved American recognition and support.

== Publications ==
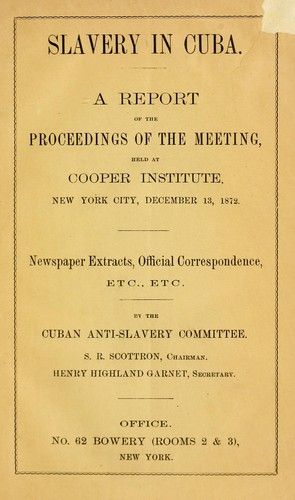
Slavery in Cuba, the first report and minutes from the Cuban Anti-Slavery Committee

In early 1873, the Committee published a pamphlet entitled Slavery in Cuba. The pamphlet contained minutes from the Cooper Institute meeting of December 13, 1872, as well as excerpts from speeches at the meeting, a pamphlet on Cuban slavery prepared in Britain for presentation to Parliament, advertisements for the meeting, a poem, and correspondence between the British and Foreign Anti-Slavery Society and Lord Granville. The pamphlet was printed in the offices of the New York Sun and sold from the Committee's office on the corner of Bowery and Canal Streets. Its total circulation is uncertain and its impact impossible to define, but it serves as a representation of the aims of the Committee and the methods which African American activists used to advance racial advocacy in the wake of the Civil War. The publication of Slavery in Cuba has been viewed as an example of how African American activists re-purposed the old networks of the antebellum abolition movement in order to perpetuate their advocacy.

== Connections with Cuban Revolutionaries ==
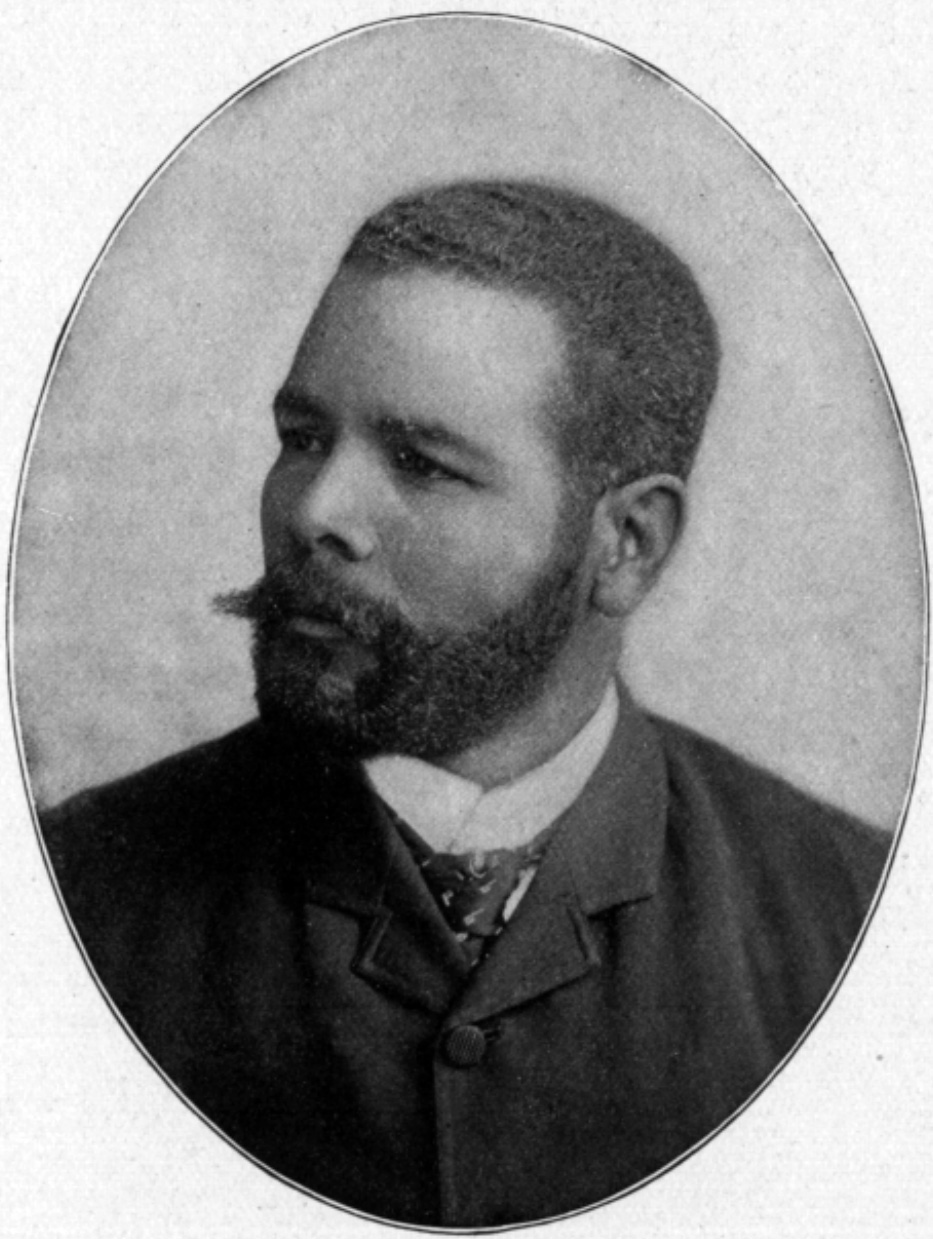
Antonio Maceó, Cuban Revolutionary

The Committee's leaders were often in contact with Cuban revolutionaries in hopes of creating an effective strategy together. Leaders of the Committee also received praise from prominent Cuban revolutionaries, most notably José Martí's admiration of Garnet. Another important recognition for the movement's momentum came when famous Cuban revolutionary general José Antonio Maceó met with leaders of the Committee's successor organization, the American Foreign Anti-Slavery Society, which surely included prominent members from the Committee.

=== Spain's Reaction ===
The Spanish government was deeply concerned about U.S. domestic support working against them in regards to Cuba. They sent agents to observe and potentially disrupt the Committee's meetings. The agents also distributed leaflets warning Americans about the claimed dangers of supporting the Cuban independence movement.

== Legacy ==
=== Political Legacies ===
The Committee had a lasting impact on political movements during the time period. Organizing centers in support of Cuban abolition appeared throughout the country, including in Charleston, Key West, and Washington D.C. Support for Cuban revolutionaries was shown through resolutions passed by the California State Colored Men's Convention and the National Civil Rights Convention. Individual states showed their support for the movement. Resolutions were passed by the Louisiana and Florida legislatures, and South Carolina lieutenant governor A. G. Ranier frequently indicated his support as well. Even after having their petition rejected by President Grant, leaders of the Committee continued their work, hoping that the next president would support their cause. The public support continued, most notably with a mass meeting in Philadelphia a year later featuring Garnet. Ultimately, the Cuban Anti-Slavery Committee's leaders became part of the American Foreign Anti-Slavery Society, seeking to broaden their cause beyond Cuba.

=== Ten Years' War ===
Ultimately, the United States did not intervene militarily in the Ten Years' War. The Grant administration made attempts to negotiate a peaceful resolution which tolerated Spanish sovereignty and enforced emancipation. These efforts, by and large, failed. As the war approached an end, the Grant administration adopted certain requirements which the United States expected Spain to meet in order to ensure continued American neutrality. Spanish failed to meet these demands and in 1878 Cuban rebels reluctantly signed the Pact of Zanjon, effectively ending the insurgency and ceding power to the Spanish. A year later, in what Cubans called La Guerra Chiquita (the Little War) insurgents once again rebelled and lost. It wasn't until 1895 with the Cuban Revolutionary War, that insurgents once again rebelled against the Spanish to demand their independence. In 1898 the United States intervened in the Cuban Revolutionary War. During this period, slavery formally ended in Cuba in 1886.

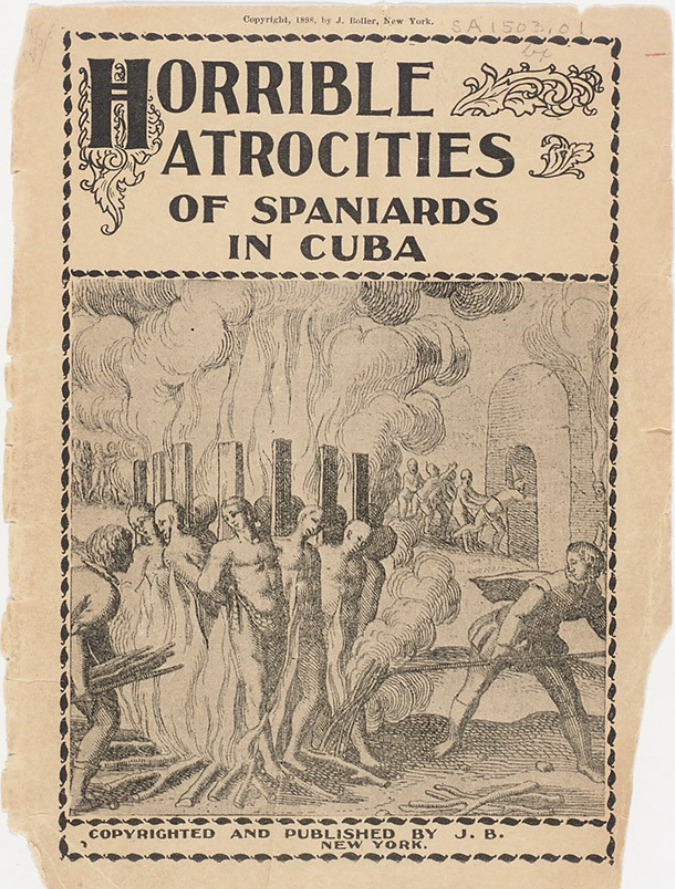
Anti-Spanish propaganda in the build-up to the Spanish-American War

=== Spanish-American War ===
Four regiments of African-American soldiers were among the first units sent to Cuba at the outbreak of the Spanish-American War. For these soldiers, who were facing serious segregation at home, they viewed serving in the war as a great opportunity for themselves. They had a chance to help free slaves in Cuba while also proving to Jim Crow America that they were equal citizens and worthy of equal rights at home.

Many Americans were excited to go to war in Cuba, because they felt the desire to help the Cuban people obtain freedom and overthrow the Spanish. Cuban freedom and victory for their oppressed masses was a popular theme at the outbreak of the war.
