= Simone Brocard =

Simone Brocard (born c. 1752) was a slave trader in the French colony of Saint-Domingue. She has been referred to as the most well-documented free colored or mixed race woman in Cap-Francais of her generation.

Brocard was a member of the free colored class in Saint-Domingue. She had two daughters with a white man, and appears to have belonged to the group of wealthy colored businesswomen of the colony who had been a lover by placage to a white man, who left her with capital to start her own business after the termination of their relationship. In 1772, Brocard is noted to be an independent and rich businesswoman of note in the colony, and her business transactions are preserved to a large degree and the object of research. She was foremost a slave trader, whose main line of business was to buy and sell slaves from and to clients of the free colored class, mainly women.

Brocard was involved not only in slave trade coming of incoming ships, but also of those born in the colony. The registries suggest that Brocard sold slaves to free blacks living in Cap Français. There is little information on her family, although it seems that she had two daughters, her first daughter was born when Brocard was fifteen or sixteen, and even when there is no mention of a possible father, both are described as "quadroons," daughters of a mulato woman and a white man.

She died sometime after 1784.

== See also ==
- Zabeau Bellanton
