= Anne Rossignol =

Slave trader

Anne Rossignol (1730–1810), was a famous signare businesswoman and slave trader. Born on Gorée, she emigrated to Saint-Domingue in 1775, where she became one of the three richest free coloured businesswomen in the colony, alongside Zabeau Bellanton in Cap-Français and Jeanne-Genevieve Deslandes in Port-au-Prince. She emigrated to Charleston, South Carolina during the Haitian Revolution, and has been called the first free African to have emigrated voluntarily and freely to America.

== Life ==
Anne Rossignol was born as the daughter of the Frenchman Claude Rossignol and the African signare Madeleine-Francoise of Gorée. She accompanied her father and his legal French wife to France as a child in 1736. In the documents, she was referred to as her father's natural mulatto daughter.

=== Gorée ===
She returned from France to Gorée on an unknown date. By birth she belonged to the privileged Afro-France signare community of Gorée: her sister Marie-Therese became the sister-in-law of the French Governor of Gorée Jean-Baptiste Estouphan by her marriage to Blaise Estouphan de Saint-Jean in 1749. Anne Rossignol was noted to be living in Gorée in the 1750s, where she had a son and a daughter, Armand and Marie-Adelaide, with the Frenchman Aubert of Marseilles, an official of the Compagnie des Indes. As other signare's, she would have participated in the slave trade: in 1767, she owned thirty "captives".

=== Saint-Domingue ===
In 1775, Rossignol emigrated with her children from French Gorée to Cap-Français in the French colony of Saint-Domingue. On Saint-Domingue, she became a successful businesswoman in slave trade and investments in real estate.

She owned a number of buildings in Le Cap, some of them luxurious and located in parts of town normally inhabited mainly by white people, and resided in a palatial building. She also owned a number of personal slaves aside from the slaves she traded in. Her living standard rivaled some of the richest white people of the colony.

In 1786, her daughter married the white surgeon Guillaume Dumont, and was given a dowry larger than what was given to many of the richest white planters of the colony. She is noted as one of the three richest coloured women in the colony, alongside Zabeau Bellanton of Cap-Français and Jeanne-Genevieve Deslandes of Port-au-Prince.

=== South Carolina ===
On an unknown date during the Haitian Revolution, Anne Rossignol fled to Charleston, South Carolina in the United States with her daughter and her white son-in-law (her son having returned to Gorée). Her daughter is confirmed to have lived in Charleston at least from the year 1800 onward, and is listed as white in 1829.

Anne Rossignol is referred to as a rare example of a voluntary African immigrant to the Americas, and perhaps first African to have freely emigrated to the United States. In Charleston, she established herself as a slave owner and planter and died as a very rich woman. Her life story is considered uncommon among the free people of color, particularly in the United States.

== See also ==
- Jean-Baptiste Belley, Haitian politician who was born at Goree.
- Zabeau Bellanton

== Sources ==
- Lorelle Semley, To be Free and French: Citizenship in France's Atlantic Empire
- Stewart R. King: Blue Coat Or Powdered Wig: Free People of Color in Pre-revolutionary Saint Domingue
- Women in Port: Gendering Communities, Economies, and Social Networks in Atlantic Port Cities, 1500-1800 / edited by Douglas Catterall and Jodi Campbell.
