= Royal Street, New Orleans =

Thoroughfare in New Orleans, United States

Coordinates: 29.9596°N 90.0633°W

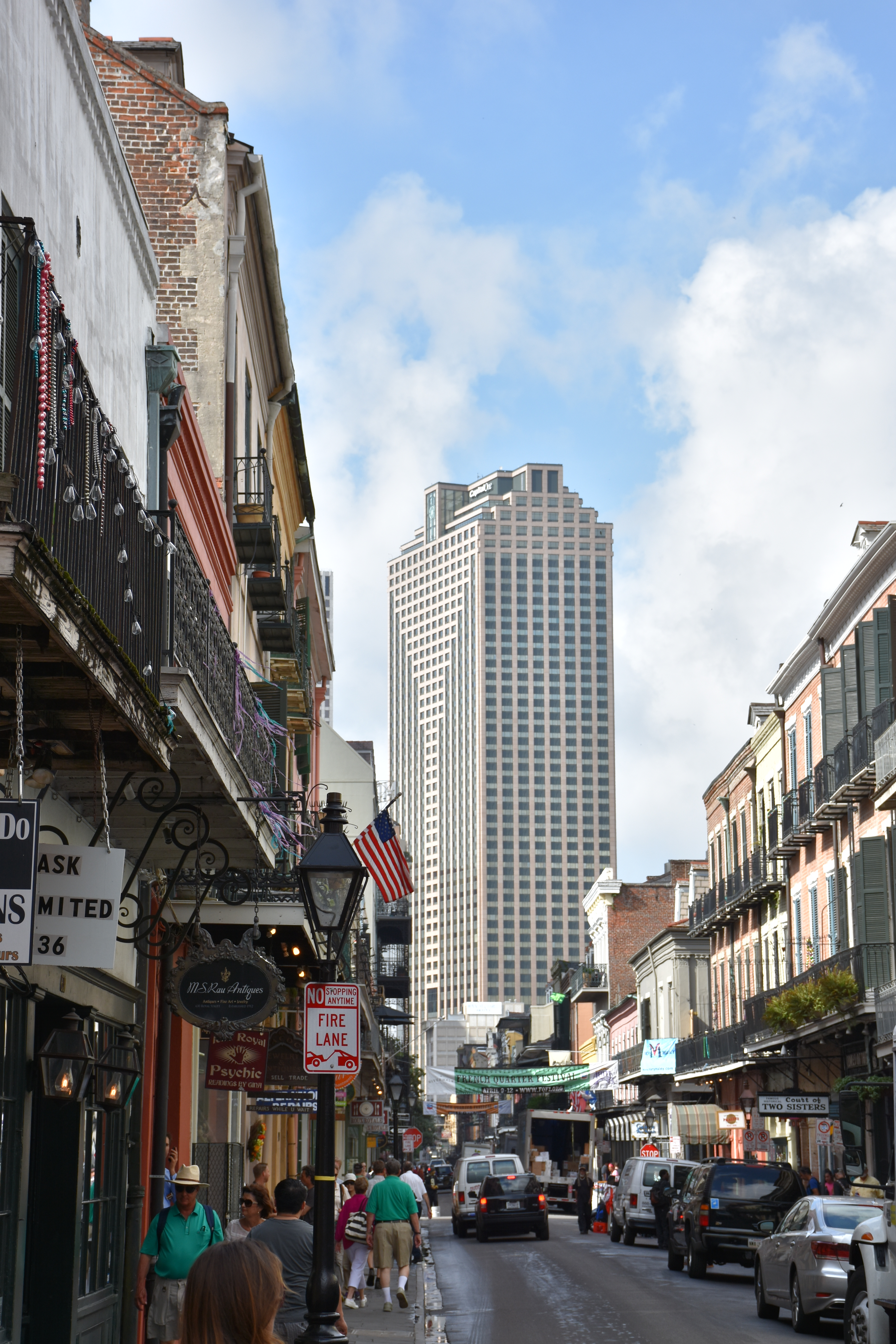
Looking southwest down Royal Street during the 2015 French Quarter Festival. (The skyscraper is the Place St. Charles office building.)

Royal Street (French: Rue Royale; Spanish: Calle Real) is a street in the French Quarter of New Orleans, Louisiana, U.S. It is one of the original streets of the city, dating from the early 18th century, and is known today for its antique shops, art galleries, and hotels.

== History Of Royal Street ==
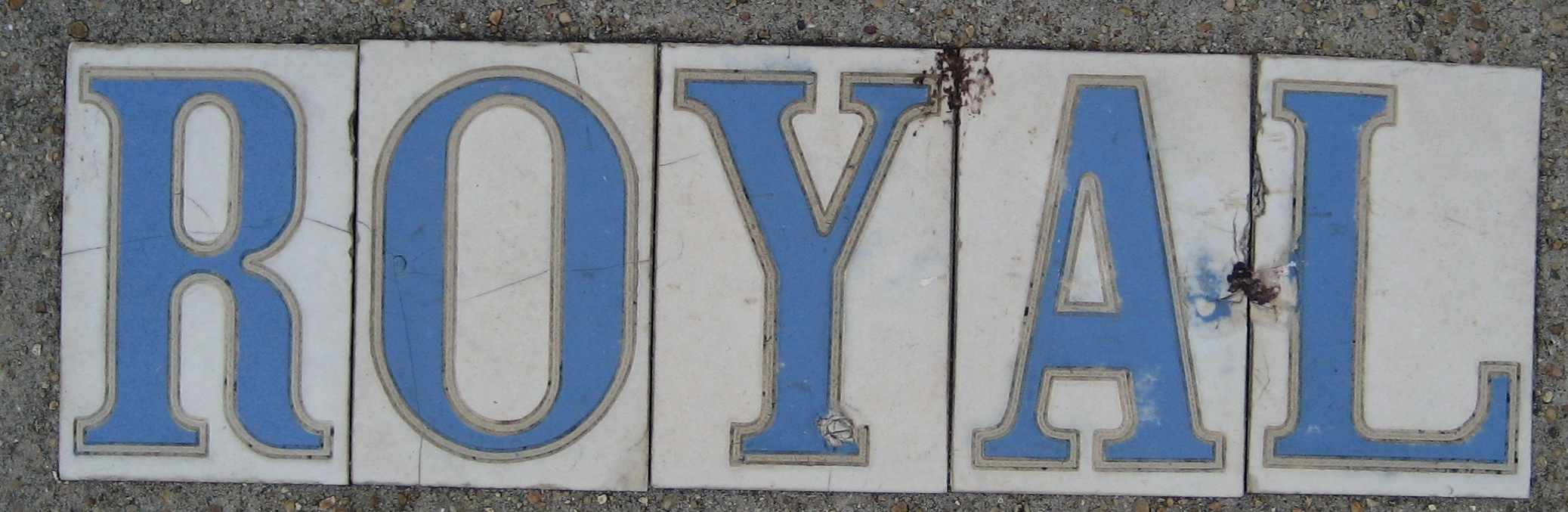
Royal street tiles

The street starts at Canal Street (above Canal Street, the corresponding street is uptown New Orleans' St. Charles Avenue). Royal runs down through the French Quarter, Faubourg Marigny, Bywater, and Lower Ninth Ward neighborhoods to the Jackson Barracks. The Industrial Canal forms a gap in the street between the Bywater and Lower Ninth Ward neighborhoods.

The portion of Rue Royale in the upper French Quarter (toward Canal Street) is known for its opulent antique shops and art galleries. The prices at those shops tend to be high; indeed, the area has been listed as one of the world's most expensive places to shop. The finer antique stores display not simply items that are old, but such rare items as pieces of fine furniture owned by royalty of past centuries. The 800 block of Royal has traditionally been similar to the 700 Block, featuring various art galleries. Art galleries still line this block; however, the recent openings of The Vampire Cafe, Voodoo Bone Lady, and Sassy Magick Noir have transformed the block into a haven for the spiritual and spooky inclined. The 700 block of Royal features the galleries of New Orleans–based artists Ally Burguieres and George Rodrigue.

Each afternoon, three blocks of Royal Street in the Quarter, between St. Louis and St. Ann Streets, are closed to traffic to create a pedestrian zone. At that time numerous street performers set up. Outstanding, up-and-coming New Orleans jazz musicians can be heard in the vicinity, although performers vary widely. Royal Street also contains restaurants and hotels, notably the Hotel Monteleone, a family-owned high-rise established in the late 19th century.

Despite catastrophic effects of 2005's Hurricane Katrina in much of New Orleans, Royal Street was spared the flood, other than in the lower ninth ward. The French Quarter, originally the city itself, was built upon naturally-higher ground next to a curve in the Mississippi River.

== See also ==
- Brennan's
- Haunting of the Octoroon Mistress
- Downtown New Orleans
- The Historic New Orleans Collection
- National Register of Historic Places listings in Orleans Parish, Louisiana
- List of streets of New Orleans
