= Haunting of the Octoroon Mistress =

Coordinates: 29.958°N 90.064°W

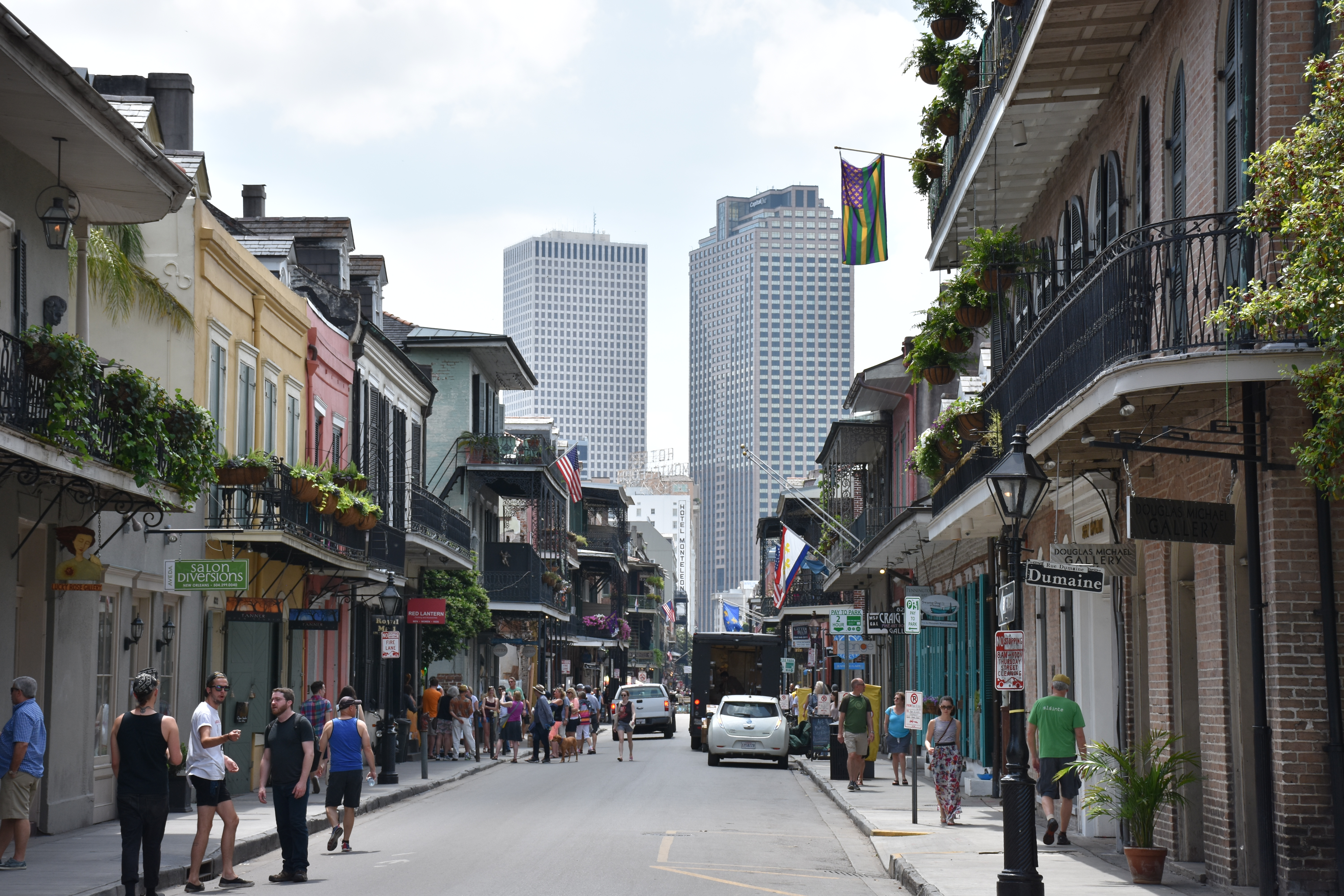
Royal Street, New Orleans

The Haunting of the Octoroon Mistress is a ghost tale about the haunting of a house on 734 Royal Street in New Orleans, Louisiana.

== Background ==
The haunting of the Octoroon House is founded on nineteenth-century cultural etiquette surrounding race in New Orleans. The term Octoroon is used for people in New Orleans in the nineteenth century that were 1/8 Black and 7/8 white. These octoroons were known as Creoles of color. Relationships between octoroons and elite Creoles of New Orleans were prohibited, but young men commonly had strong attractions to octoroon women because of their beauty. Because of different social statuses, Creole men and octoroon women were prohibited from marrying. Octoroon balls were used as a way for rich Creoles to obtain an octoroon mistress. Creole men and octoroon women used these balls to form relationships where they mutually benefitted. Most of the men had families aside from the octoroon mistresses and would often keep their affairs a secret.

== Synopsis of the legend ==
Supposedly, an octoroon woman named Julie occupied the Royal Street house in the 1850s. Julie met and fell in love with a very handsome and rich Frenchman. To the Frenchman, Julie was just his secret lover. But to Julie, the Frenchman was much more. Julie desperately wanted to marry the Frenchman, but the Frenchman repeatedly denied her request for marriage because of her social status. After months of begging the Frenchman devised a test that he thought would prove Julie's love for him. He told her that he was going to play a card game downstairs with some of his friends and while he was entertaining his guests he wanted her to strip off her clothing and wait on the rooftop for him until he was done. The Frenchman thought Julie would not take his request seriously and continued to entertain his friends. Julie was desperate to show her undeniable love for the Frenchman, so she immediately undressed and waited on the rooftop for her lover to return. Julie waited patiently in the cold and damp December air for her lover. When the Frenchman finally made his way to bed, he realized that Julie was nowhere to be found. He had not thought she took his request seriously, but he ran up to the rooftop to look for her. When he got up there, he saw her naked, frozen body in a corner, waiting patiently for him to return. The death of Julie put the Frenchman into a deep depression because he really loved Julie. Some versions of the legend say he died a few months later of a broken heart.

== Hauntings ==
Supposedly, Julie is still said to haunt the house in which she resided. Some say on a cold and damp December night one can see her figure pacing on the rooftop waiting for her lover to return. Her ghost supposedly roams the floors of the house, but her presence is a friendly one. The house is now home to the Bottom of the Tea Cup Psychic Readings and many of the employees and customers claim to have had many encounters with her. They often note her as playful and energetic with many giggles being heard from room to room. The Frenchman's ghost also supposedly roams the garden outside, and people who have encountered him have said that his spirit seems sad.
