= Marchande =

Female merchant in the Mississippi Delta

A marchande was a female street or country merchant or vendor local to the Mississippi Delta (and Louisiana in particular) known for selling Creole cuisine, fruits, vegetables, and other household items.

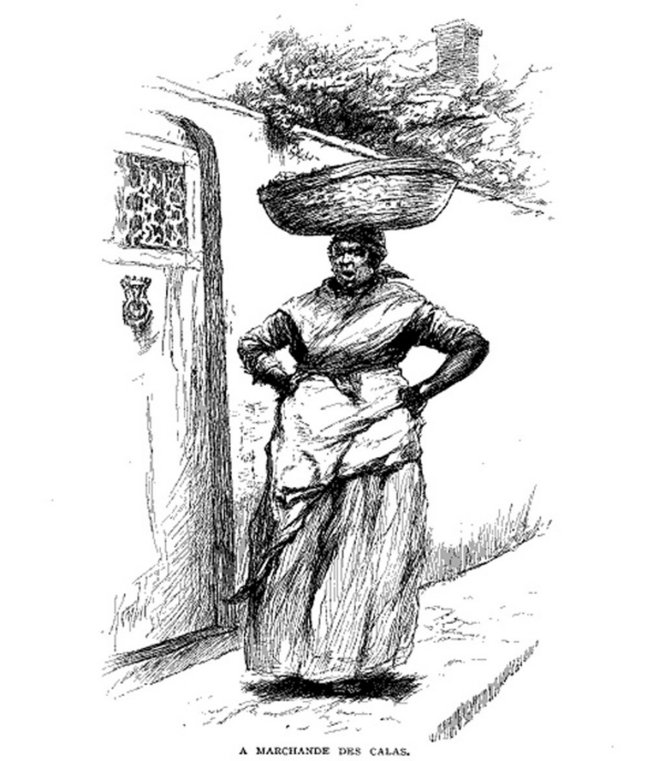
"A Marchande des Calas" Calas vendor, New Orleans, 1886

Marchandes were common in southern Louisiana until the end of the 20th century, after which the marchande as a phenomenon became obsolete.

The Federal Writers' Project includes an account of a marchande "crossing the ferry at Westwego with a basket of blackberries on her head". In the account, the marchande's "easy, familiar fashion" is compared to the approach that 19th and 20th century Creole had to Christianity (with God as a "close friend").

Many Creole slaves functioned as marchandes during the week, selling produce and performing household tasks on weekends when markets were closed. It was also possible for freed slaves to establish themselves as la marchande in their local communities. Many Creoles procured a large proportion of their goods this way; in open markets run by a combination of slaves and former slaves.

== See also ==
- History of slavery in Louisiana
- Coartación
- Marchand, Louisiana
