= Victor Rochon =

American politician (1843–1892)

Victor Rochon (March 23, 1843 - November 15, 1892) was a merchant, public official, and state legislator in Louisiana. He served in the Louisiana House of Representatives representing St. Martin Parish from 1872 to 1874 and briefly in 1875 and from 1888 to 1890.

He was the son of Serile Rochon and Eliza Cadtille. He studied at Straight University.

Henry Louis Gates discussed the Rochon family history on a PBS show exploring Valerie Jarrett's ancestry.

== See also ==
- Charles Rochon
- Etnah Rochon Boutte
- List of Louisiana Creoles
- African American officeholders from the end of the Civil War until before 1900
