= Slavery in Cuba =

National occurrence of slavery

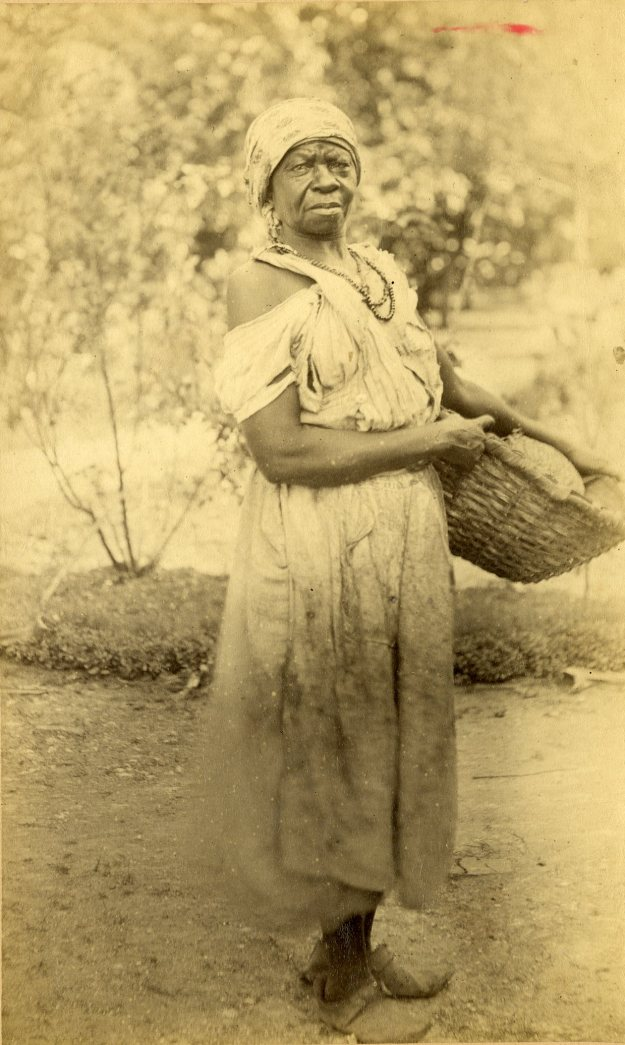
An enslaved Afro-Cuban in the 19th century

Slavery in Cuba (Spanish: La Esclavitud en Cuba) was a portion of the larger Atlantic slave trade that primarily supported Spanish plantation owners engaged in the sugarcane trade. It was practiced on the island of Cuba from the 16th century until it was abolished by Spanish royal decree on October 7, 1886.

The first organized system of slavery in Cuba was introduced by the Spanish Empire, which attacked and enslaved the island's indigenous Taíno and Guanahatabey peoples on a grand scale. Cuba's original population was decimated after the arrival of the Spaniards, due to both a lack of immunity to Old World diseases such as smallpox, but also because of the conditions associated with the forced labor that was used by the Spanish colonist throughout the 16th century. The remaining Taíno intermixed with Europeans or African slaves and no full-blooded Taíno remained after the 17th century, though many Cubans today do have Taíno DNA and are descendants of those intermixed Taínos.

Following the decimation of the island's native population, the Spaniards wanted new slaves to uphold their sugarcane production. They brought more than a million enslaved African people to Cuba. The African enslaved population grew to outnumber European Cubans, and a large proportion of Cubans today descend from these enslaved peoples—perhaps as much as 65% of the population.

Cuba became one of the world's largest sugarcane producers after the Haitian Revolution and continued to import enslaved Africans long after the practice was outlawed for Spanish citizens in 1817. Cuba did not stop participating in the Atlantic slave trade until 1867, and slavery on the island was not abolished by Spain until 1886. Due to growing pressure to stop the Cuban slave trade throughout the 19th century, more than 100,000 Chinese indentured workers were imported to Cuba to replace dwindling African labor. During the 19th century, Cuban slavery was revitalized by French, Spanish and American expatriates, many of whom moved to Cuba either due to the growing importance of the island's plantation economy or the gradual abolishment of slavery elsewhere.

== History ==
Since the 1550s, the Spaniards had relied on the Indigenous Taíno population for their primary enslaved labor. The Indigenous population of Cuba was facing declining numbers from disease and warfare. Many enslaved Tainos fled into the interiors of Cuba, as they were much more familiar with the land than the Spaniards were. Between the population decline and the indigenous rebellions against Spanish rule, the demand for labor in Cuba became high. The Spaniards introduced chattel slavery of West African people to remedy this labor shortage.

They provided services to the garrisons of the Nueva España and Tierra Firme fleets, which arrived at the port annually. Throughout the 1500s and 1600s, slaves made up a large portion of the services sector of the city's economy and also held numerous skilled trade positions in Havana. European Cuban historian José Martín Félix de Arrate y Acosta recalled in 1761 that "negros and pardos" were "very able and capable to apply themselves, becoming distinguished masters, not only in the lowest ones such as shoemakers, tailors, masons, and carpenters, but also in those which require more ability and genius, such as silversmith's craft, sculpture, painting, and carving, as denoted by their marvelous works." Some enslaved Havanans worked under a market-based system in which the enslaved person had the responsibility of finding their own job and employer, and then giving over a portion of their earnings to their owner.

Slaves in Cuba did not begin to experience the harsh conditions of plantation agriculture until after the 1770s, once the international plantation economy had expanded into Western Cuba. In 1740, the Havana Company was formed to stimulate the sugar industry by encouraging the importation of slaves into Cuba, although it largely unsuccessful. In 1762, British forces under the Earl of Albemarle captured Havana during the Seven Years' War. During their year-long occupation of Havana and surrounding regions, the British expanded the Cuban plantation system and imported 4,000 slaves from the British West Indies to work on them. This substantially expanded the number of slaves in Cuba, as just over 40,000 slaves had been imported to the island over the previous 250 years. Spain regained control of British-occupied regions of Cuba in 1763 by ceding Spanish Florida to Britain in exchange.

The British had also freed 90 Cuban slaves who had sided with them during the invasion, in recognition of their contribution to the Spanish defeat. Given their role in the Seven Years' War, Spanish colonial official Julián de Arriaga realized that Cuban slaves could support foreign nations that offered them freedom. He thus began to issue cartas de libertad and emancipated some two dozen slaves who had defended Havana against the British. The Spanish Crown increased slave imports to ensure the loyalty of European Cuban planters and to increase revenues from the lucrative sugar trade, as the crop was then in high demand in Europe.

In 1791, slaves in the French colony of Saint-Domingue rose up in rebellion. In 1803, ships carrying white and free people of color refugees arrived in Cuba from Saint-Domingue. Though all the passengers on board had been legally free under French law for years, and many of the mixed-race people had been born free, upon their arrival the Cubans classified those of even partial African descent as slaves. The white passengers were allowed entry into Cuba while African and mulatto passengers were restrained on the ships. Some of the white passengers had additionally claimed some of the Black passengers as slaves during the journey. The women of African descent and their children were particularly subject to being pressed into slavery.

In the long run, Santiago de Cuba was a receptive landing point for men and women who hoped to restore the social relations of slavery, and for their project of redefining others among the refugees as slaves. Authorized since 1789 as a port of arrival for the transatlantic trade in African captives, Santiago served an expanding hinterland of plantations producing sugar and coffee. Ships arrived regularly from the west coast of Africa, delivering bound laborers into the urban and rural economy. Men and women from Saint-Domingue who brought with them both financial resources and the habit of command could make a convincing case that they – and their 'slaves' – offered something of value to a developing agricultural export sector. Those with more-modest resources, including men and women designated mulatos or mulatas libres, could simply point out that they needed the labor of one or two slaves to avoid becoming a charge on the Cuban government.

The Haitians finally gained their independence in 1804. They declared the new Republic of Haiti, making it second Republic in the Western Hemisphere and the first founded by former slaves. Cuban slaveholders watched these events closely, but took comfort in thinking the rebellion was the result of the radical politics of the French Revolution, during which the French government had abolished slavery in the colonies before Napoleon attempted to reintroduce it shortly afterwards. As the new freedmen set up small subsistence farms in Haiti, Cuba's planters gained much of the sugar market formerly held by Saint-Domingue's large plantations. As sugar expanded to dominate the economy in Cuba, planters greatly expanded their importation of slaves from Africa. As a result, "between 1791 to 1805, 91,211 slaves entered the island through Havana".

In the early 19th century, Cuban planters, who relied almost exclusively on foreign slave traders, closely followed debates on abolishing slavery in both Britain and the United States. In 1807, the British and American governments abolished the Atlantic slave trade, with the British ban taking effect in 1807 and the American ban taking effect in 1808. Unlike in the rest of the Americas, the 19th-century European-descended Cuban elite did not form an anti-colonial movement. They worried that such action would encourage enslaved Cubans to revolt. Cuban elites petitioned the Spanish Crown to create an independent Cuban slave-trading company, and smugglers continued to ship slaves to the island when they could evade British and American anti-slavery patrols around West Africa.

In March 1812, a series of revolts led by freedman José Antonio Aponte erupted in the plantations of Cuba. After the revolts were suppressed by the local militias armed by the government, hundreds of slaves were arrested, with many of the leaders being tried and executed.

By 1817, Britain and Spain were making a concerted effort to reform their diplomatic ties and negotiate the legal status of the Atlantic slave trade. An Anglo-Spanish treaty in 1817 formally gained Spanish agreement to immediately end the slave trade north of the Equator and expand enforcement against illegal slave ships. But, as recorded by legal trade documents of the era, 372,449 slaves were imported to Cuba before the slave trade legally ended, and at least 123,775 were imported between 1821 and 1853.

Even as the slave trade ceased in other parts of the Atlantic, the Cuban slave trade continued on until 1867. The ownership of human beings as chattel slaves remained legal in Cuba until 1880. The slave trade in Cuba would not systematically end until chattel Cuban slavery was abolished by Spanish royal decree in 1886, making it one of the last countries in the Western Hemisphere (preceding only Brazil) to formally abolish slavery.

Over 20 distinct African ethnic groups were brought to Cuba during the history of slavery on the island. Of these 20, the main 6 were the: Lucumi (Yoruba), Mandingo, Ganga (Sierra Leone), Arará (Gbe speaking people of Dahomey and Allada), Carabali (the peoples of and around Calabar, in eastern Nigeria), and Congo (mainly Bakongo).

== Conditions of enslavement ==
Enslaved people on sugar plantations and in sugar mills were often subject to the harshest conditions. Field work was rigorous manual labor that began at an early age. Work days lasted close to 20 hours during harvest and processing, including cultivating and cutting the crops, hauling wagons, and processing sugarcane with dangerous machinery. Enslaved people were forced to reside in barracoons, where they were crammed in and locked in by a padlock at night, getting about three to four hours of sleep. The conditions of the barracoons were highly unsanitary and extremely hot. Typically there was no ventilation; the only window was a small barred hole in the wall.

"So the place swarmed with fleas and ticks that gave the entire work force infections and diseases."

— Biography of a Runaway Slave, page 23

Enslaved people who misbehaved, underproduced, or disobeyed their masters were often placed in stocks in boiler houses, where they were abandoned for anywhere from a few days to as much as two to three months at a time. The wooden stocks were built in both standing and prostrate varieties, and women were subjected to this and other forms of torture even when pregnant. When subjected to whippings, pregnant women had to lay "face down over a scooped-out piece of round [earth] to protect their bellies." Some masters reportedly whipped pregnant women in the belly, often causing miscarriages. Enslaved Cubans developed herbal remedies to treat torture wounds where possible, applying "compresses of tobacco leaves, urine and salt" to lashing wounds in particular.

Under Spanish law in the sixteenth and seventeenth centuries, enslaved people had certain rights and were able to appeal to authorities to ensure the enforcement of these rights. These rights were influenced by the Siete Partidas code of Alfonso X the Wise, which regulated slavery in Castile. Some of these rights included the right to purchase freedom and access to Catholic sacraments, such as baptism and marriage. The purchase of freedom was often facilitated by a legal custom, coartación. Through coartación, enslaved people were able to come to agreements with their slaveholder on a price for their freedom and would pay for their manumission in installments. Enslaved people who created these agreements with their slaveholders were called coartados.

In 1789, the Spanish Crown led an effort to reform slavery, as the demand for enslaved labor in Cuba was growing. The Crown issued a decree, the Código Negro Español (Spanish Black Code), that specified food and clothing provisions, put limits on the number of work hours, limited punishments, required religious instruction, and protected marriages, forbidding the sale of young children away from their mothers. But planters often flouted the laws and protested against them. They considered the code a threat to their authority and an intrusion into their personal lives.

The slave owners did not protest against all the measures of the code, many of which, they argued, were already common practices. They objected to efforts to set limits on their ability to apply physical punishment. For instance, the Black Code limited lashings to 25 and required whipping "not to cause serious bruises or bleeding". The slaveholders thought that the enslaved Cubans would interpret these limits as weaknesses, ultimately leading to resistance. Another contested issue was the restriction of work hours "from sunrise to sunset." Planters said that during the harvest season, the rapid cutting and processing of cane required 20-hour days. Enslaved people working on plantations ultimately had minimal opportunities to claim any of these rights. Most coartados during this time were urban enslaved people.

== Gendered slavery ==
Cuban patriarchy provided a framework for projecting gender roles onto enslaved peoples. Just as the practice of machismo solidified male domination over others, the practice of marianismo elevated the position of white women over enslaved peoples. Machismo and marianismo functioned symbiotically: the Hispanic Cuban male was expected to express dominance in public spaces and ventures like the slave trade, while Hispanic women exercised control of private spaces (including those staffed by enslaved people) through feminine virtues like motherhood, modesty, and honor.

Cuba's slavery system was gendered in that some labor was performed only by men, and some only by women. Enslaved women in the city of Havana, from the sixteenth century onwards, performed duties such as operating the town taverns, eating houses, and lodges, as well as working as laundresses and domestic laborers. Enslaved women were also forced to serve as sex slaves in the towns.

One form of gendered enslaved labor utilized by white Cubans was that of wet nursing. Postpartum enslaved women would be advertised in newspapers as available to provide their breast milk to white babies while their own children were typically left of the archival narrative. While typically the money from wet nursing went straight to the enslaver, there is record of enslaved women being able to utilize these wages for their freedom through coartación.

Though gender roles were predominant in enslaved peoples' labor, historical narratives have been interpreted in gendered ways that highlight the role of men in the resistance to slavery, while occluding the role of enslaved women. Further studies show that the relationship between gender and slave revolt was complex. For instance, historical interpretations of the La Escalera conspiracy reveal the role of machismo in Cuban historiography:

As December 1843 drew to a close, an enslaved woman in the Sabanilla district named Polonia Gangá shocked her master with the information that his prized sugar property was about to be engulfed in open rebellion… But commencing the story of 1844 at the moment of Polonia's declaration also necessarily equates a woman's betrayal.

A machismo historical perspective frames betrayal as one of the only possibilities for enslaved women's participation in insurrection, because it associates rebellion exclusively to masculine aggression. But despite enslaved women being viewed through this limiting lens, these women were known to have played a key role both in armed rebellion against slavery and in more subtle forms of resistance. One such leader was an enslaved woman named Carlota, who led a rebellion in the Triunvirate plantation in Matanzas in 1843. She is considered a pioneer in the Cuban fight against slavery.

Enslaved women also practiced methods of resistance that did not involve armed rebellion. Cuban oral histories and newspaper advertisements indicate a contingent of formerly enslaved women who escaped from their owners. And as in other Latin cultures, racial segregation was not strictly enforced between white men and the mulatta population in Cuba, so some enslaved Cuban women thus gained their freedom through familial and sexual relationships with white men. Men who took enslaved women as wives or concubines sometimes freed both them and their children. Free mixed-race people thus eventually began to constitute an additional Cuban social class in a stature beneath ethnic Europeans and above enslaved Africans. Both freedmen and free people of color, generally of mixed race, came to represent 20% of the total Cuban population and 41% of the non-white Cuban population.

However, plantation owners also encouraged Afro-Cuban enslaved women to have children in order to increase their enslaved work force and replace people killed by the harsh conditions of slavery. Owners paired strong black men with healthy black women, even if they were immediate relatives, forcing them to have sex and "breed stock" of children. The children could then be sold for about 500 pesos, and also saved owners on the cost of importing additional enslaved people from Africa. Sometimes if the owners did not like the quality of the children, they separated the parents and sent the mother back to working in the fields.

== Literary legacy ==
Caña (Sugarcane)

El negro
junto al cañaveral.

El yanqui
sobre el cañaveral.

La tierra
bajo el cañaveral.

¡Sangre
que se nos va!

English translation

The Negro
bound to the canefield.

The Yankee
above the canefield.

The earth
beneath the canefield.

Blood
seeps out of us!

— ~Nicolás Guillén

Slavery left a long-lasting mark on Cuban culture that persists to the present day. Cuban writers such as Nicolás Guillén and Lydia Cabrera participated in the Pan-African Négritude movement of the early 20th century (locally known as negrista or negrismo). Afro-Cuban writers undertook a Hispanophone effort to reclaim Cuban blackness and connections to African culture, while expressing a new sensibility comparable to the Harlem Renaissance in New York City. Guillén, Cabrera, and their contemporaries revisited and tried to make sense of slavery and other crimes against Afro-Cuban people, as well as celebrating the enslaved people who had survived and created their own culture.

== See also ==
- Abolition of slavery in Spain
- Cuban Anti-Slavery Committee formed in the United States in 1872 by African American men
- Slavery in colonial Spanish America
