= Julie Dahey =

Julie Dahey (d. after 1782), was a planter in Saint-Domingue.

Julie Dahey was a member of the class of Gens de couleur or free colours in Saint-Domingue. In 1767, following a common custom in Saint-Domingue, she became the professional mistress of the wealthy white sugar planter Sieur Thomas Peignanan, with the title menagere or housekeeper, with whom she had seven children.

After the Seven Years' War, it became common from White Frenchmen to move temporarily to the colony of Saint-Domingue to make a fortune before they returned to France; while there, they did not marry within the White French planter aristocracy but instead lived in placage with a free woman of color, to whom they left land, slaves, business and property when they returned to France or died. This created a significant business class of rich free people of colors in Saint-Domingue, among whom Nanette Pincemaille (d. 1784), Anne Laporte (d. 1783) and Julie Dahey belonged to the most notable examples.

Julie Dahey managed a coffee plantation from 1779, and a pottery- and brick factory in Croix des Bouquets in companionship with Sieur La Bacheliere. In 1781, she rented land from the crown on favorable terms and founded a sugar plantation with the right to buy it when the contract expired twelve years later. In 1782, Peignanan wrote a will in which Dahey was given his personal property and his sister Catherine was given the ownership of his plantation on the condition that she rented it to Julie Dahey; she was further granted 12000 livres and her seven children three of his slaves each. Julie Dahey, alongside Zabeau Bellanton, thus belonged to the leading figures of Gens de couleur businesspeople on Saint-Domingue prior to the Haitian Revolution.
