= Plaçage =

Civil union in French slave colonies

Plaçage (French pronunciation: [plasaʒə]) was a recognized extralegal system in French slave colonies of North America (including the Caribbean) by which ethnic European men entered into civil unions with non-Europeans of African, Native American and mixed-race descent. The term comes from the French placer meaning "to place with". The women were not legally recognized as wives but were known as placées; their relationships were recognized among the free people of color as mariages de la main gauche or left-handed marriages. They became institutionalized with contracts or negotiations that settled property on the woman and her children and, in some cases, gave them freedom if they were enslaved. The system flourished throughout the French period, reaching its zenith during the latter, between 1769 and 1803.

The system may have been most widely practiced in New Orleans, where planter society had created enough wealth to support the system. It also took place in the Latin-influenced cities of Natchez and Biloxi, Mississippi; Mobile, Alabama; St. Augustine and Pensacola, Florida; as well as Saint-Domingue (now the Republic of Haiti). Plaçage became associated with New Orleans as part of its cosmopolitan society.

Emily Clark has challenged the popular notion of plaçage as being a systemic practice based on contractual marriages, and proposes that the practice largely consisted of a broad range of relationships between free women of color and white men that originated in various ways, which often lasted for a lifetime. Genetic evidence strongly supports the historical record of mass intermarriages between white men and women of color in New Orleans.

== History and development ==
The plaçage system developed from the predominance of men among early colonial populations, who took women as consorts from Native Americans, free women of color and enslaved Africans. In this period there was a shortage of European women, as the colonies were dominated in the early day by male explorers and colonists.

Given the harsh conditions in the colonies, persuading women to follow the men was not easy. France sent women convicted along with their debtor husbands and in 1719 deported 209 women felons "who were of a character to be sent to the French settlement in Louisiana."

The placage system first developed in Saint-Domingue. France sent women from the poor houses to the West Indies, but they had the reputation of also being former prostitutes from La Salpêtrière, and in 1713 and again in 1743, the authorities in Saint-Domingue complained that Paris sent the settlers unsuitable former prostitutes as wives. The custom of sending brides from France was therefore discontinued in the French West Indies in the mid-18th century, which benefitted the development of a placage system there. A new colonisation policy was adopted in which male colonists from France merely came to the colony to make their fortune and returned to France after a few years during which they did not marry but lived with a free woman of colour.

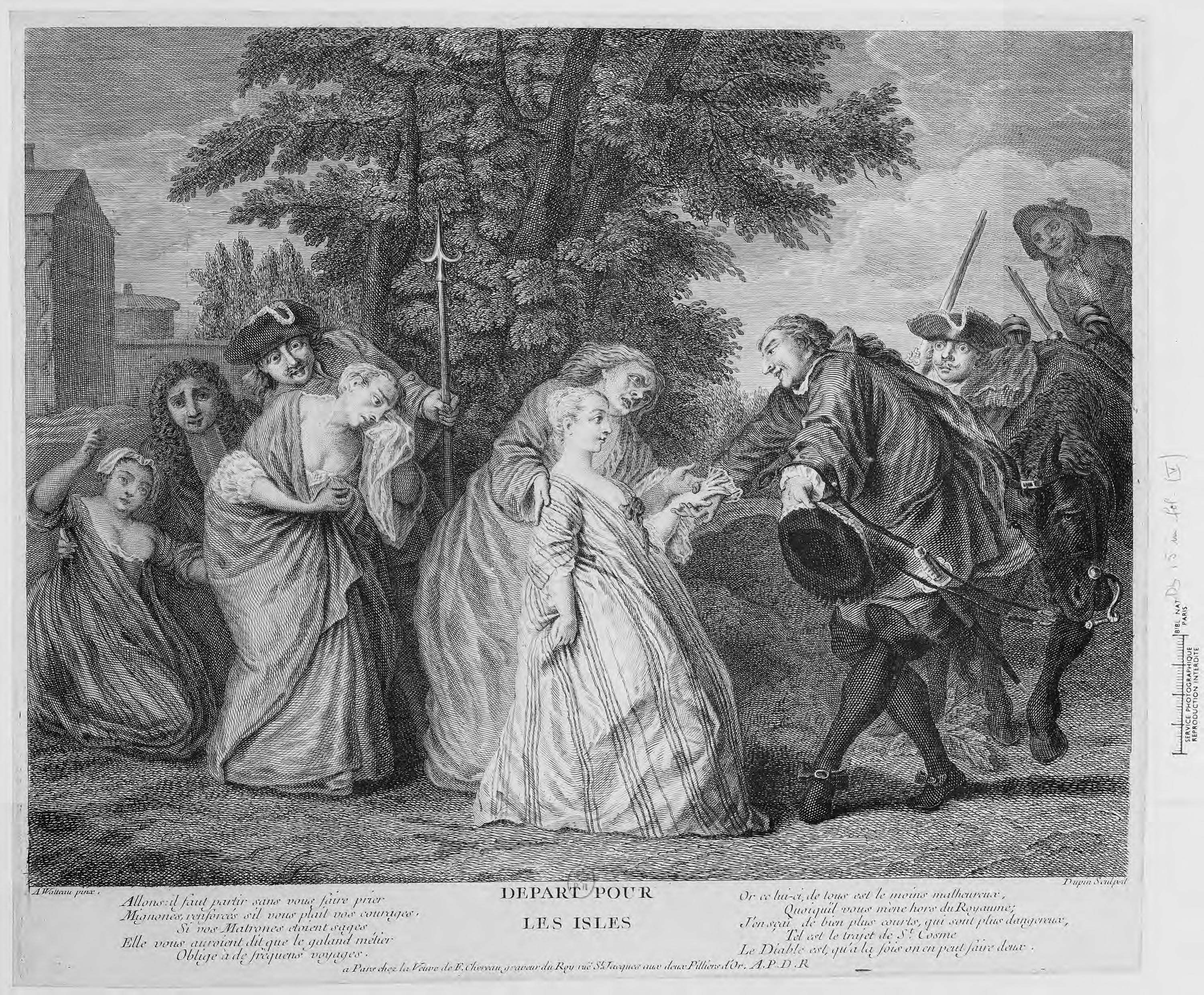
A print by Dupin after Jean-Antoine Watteau depicting "comfort women" embarking unwillingly for the Americas. Whether "comfort women," "casket girls," or aristocrats, French women were reluctant to migrate to the French colonies.

France also relocated young women orphans known as King's Daughters (French: filles du roi) to their colonies for marriage to both Canada and Louisiana. France recruited willing farm- and city-dwelling women, known as casket or casquette girls, because they brought all their possessions to the colonies in a small trunk or casket.

Historian Joan Martin maintains that there is little documentation that "casket girls", considered among the ancestors of white French Creoles, were brought to Louisiana. The Ursulines, an order of nuns, chaperoned the casket girls until they married. Martin writes that some Creole families who today identify as white had ancestors during the colonial period who were African or multiracial, whose descendants married whites over generations.

Through warfare and raids, Native American women were often captured to be traded, sold, or taken as wives. At first, the colony generally imported African men to use as slave labor because of the heavy work of clearing to develop plantations. Over time, it also imported African women as slaves. Marriage between the races was forbidden according to the Code Noir of the 18th century, but interracial sex continued. The upper class European men during that period often did not marry until their late twenties or their early thirties. Premarital sex with an intended white bride, especially if she was of high rank, was not permitted socially.

=== Free people of color ===
White male colonists, often the younger sons of noblemen, military men, and planters, who needed to accumulate some wealth before they could marry, had women of color as consorts before marriage or in some cases after their first wives died. Merchants and administrators also followed that practice if they were wealthy enough. When the women had children, they were sometimes emancipated along with their children. Both the woman and her children might assume the surnames of the man. When Creole men reached an age when they were expected to marry, some also kept their relationships with their placées, but that was less common. A wealthy white man could have two (or more) families: one legal and the other not. Their mixed-race children became the nucleus of the class of free people of color or gens de couleur libres in Louisiana and Saint-Domingue. After the Haitian Revolution in the late 18th and the early 19th centuries, many refugees came to New Orleans, adding a new wave of French-speaking free people of color.

During the period of French rule, the gens de couleur came to constitute a third class in New Orleans and other former French cities between the white Creoles and the mass of black slaves. They had certain status and rights and often acquired education and property. Later, their descendants became leaders in New Orleans, held political office in the city and state, and became part of what developed as the African-American middle class in the United States.

By 1788, 1,500 Creole women of color and black women were being maintained by white men. Certain customs had evolved. It was common for a wealthy, married Creole to live primarily outside New Orleans on his plantation with his white family. He often kept a second address in the city to use for entertaining and socializing among the white elite. He had built or bought a house for his placée and their children. She and her children were part of the society of Creoles of color. The white world might not recognize the placée as a wife legally and socially, but she was recognized as such among the Creoles of color. Some of the women acquired slaves and plantations. Particularly during the Spanish colonial era, a woman might be listed as owning slaves, who were sometimes relatives whom she intended to free after she had earned enough money to buy their freedom.

While in New Orleans (or other cities), the man would cohabit with the placée as an official "boarder" at her Creole cottage or house. Many were located near Rampart Street in New Orleans, once the demarcation line or wall between the city and the frontier. Other popular neighborhoods for Creoles of color were the Faubourg Marigny and Tremé. If the man was not married, he might keep a separate residence, preferably next door or in the same or next block as his placée. He often took part in and arranged for the upbringing and education of their children.

For a time, both boys and girls were educated in France, as there were no schools in New Orleans for mixed-race children. As supporting such a plaçage arrangement ran into thousands of dollars per year, it was limited to the wealthy.

=== Inheritance and work ===
Upon the death of her protector, the placée and her family could, on legal challenge, expect up to a third of the man's property.

The women in those relationships often worked to develop assets: acquiring property, running a legitimate rooming-house, or a small business as a hairdresser, marchande (female street or country merchant/vendor), or a seamstress. She could also become a placée to another white Creole. She sometimes taught her daughters to become placées, by education and informal schooling in dress, comportment, and ways to behave. A mother negotiated with a young man for the dowry or property settlement, sometimes by contract, for her daughter if a white Creole were interested in her. A former placée could also marry or cohabit with a Creole man of color and have more children.

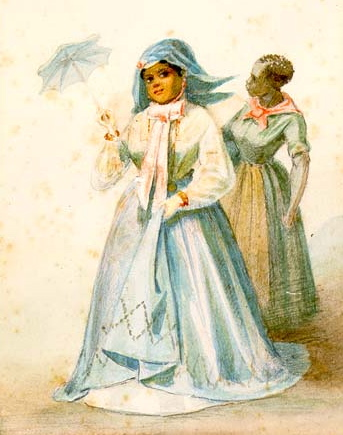
Creole woman of color with maid, from a watercolor series by Édouard Marquis, New Orleans, 1867

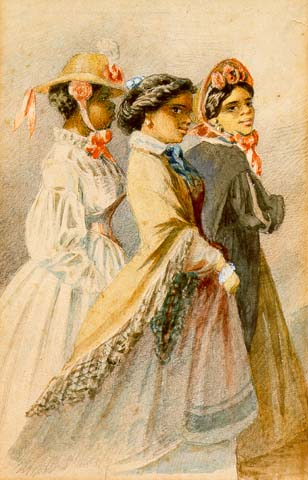
Creole women of color out taking the air, from a watercolor series by Édouard Marquis, New Orleans, 1867

Contrary to popular misconceptions, placées were not and did not become prostitutes. Creole men of color objected to the practice as denigrating the virtue of Creole women of color, but some, as descendants of white males, benefited by the transfer of social capital. Martin writes, "They did not choose to live in concubinage; what they chose was to survive."

In the late 19th and the early 20th centuries, after Reconstruction and the reassertion of white supremacy across the former Confederacy, the white Creole historians, Charles Gayarré and Alcée Fortier, wrote histories that did not address plaçage in much detail. They suggested that little race-mixing had occurred during the colonial period and that the placées had seduced or led white Creole men astray. They wrote that the French Creoles, in the sense of having long been native to Louisiana, were ethnic Europeans who were threatened, like other Southern whites, by the spectre of race-mixing.

Gayarré, when younger, was said to have taken a woman of color as his placée, and she had their children to his later shame. He married a white woman late in life. His earlier experience inspired his novel Fernando de Lemos.

== Notable placées ==
=== Marie Thérèse Metoyer ===
Marie Thérèse Metoyer dite Coincoin became an icon of black female entrepreneurship in colonial Louisiana. She was born at the frontier outpost of Natchitoches on Cane River in August 1742 as a slave of the post founder, the controversial explorer Louis Juchereau de St. Denis. She would be, for twenty years, the placée of a French colonial merchant-turned-planter, Claude Thomas Pierre Métoyer, who was two years her junior. At the onset of their plaçage, she was already the mother of five children; she would have ten more with Métoyer. In 1778, he freed her after the parish priest filed charges against Coincoin as a "public concubine" and threatened to have her sold at New Orleans if they did not end their relationship. As a free woman, she remained with Métoyer until 1788, when his growing fortune persuaded him to take a wife who could provide legal heirs. (He chose another Marie Thérèse, a white Créole of French and German birth.)

In setting Coincoin aside, Métoyer donated to her his interest in 80 arpents, about 68 acres (28 ha) of unpatented land, adjacent to his plantation, to help support their free-born offspring. On that modest tract, Coincoin planted tobacco, a valuable commodity in the struggling colony. She and her children trapped bears and wild turkeys for sales of meat, hide, and oil locally and at the New Orleans market. She also manufactured medicine, a skill shared by her formerly enslaved sister Marie Louise dite Mariotte and likely one acquired from their African-born parents. With this money, she progressively bought the freedom of four of her first five children and several grandchildren, before investing in three African-born slaves to provide the physical labor that became more difficult as she aged. After securing a colonial patent on her homestead in 1794, she petitioned for and was given a land concession from the Spanish crown, since by then Louisiana had come under Spanish control. On that piney-woods tract of 800 arpents (667 ac) on Old Red River, about 5 mi from her farmstead, she set up a vacherie (a ranch) and engaged a Spaniard to tend her cattle. Shortly before her death in 1816, Coincoin sold her homestead and divided her remaining property (her piney-woods land, the three African slaves, and their offspring) among her own progeny.

As often happened among the children of plaçages, Coincoin's one surviving daughter by Métoyer, Marie Susanne, became a placée also. As a young woman, apparently with the blessing of both parents, she entered into a relationship with a newly arrived physician, Joseph Conant from New Orleans. When he left Cane River, soon after the birth of their son, she formed a second and lifelong plaçage with a Cane River planter, Jean Baptiste Anty. As a second-generation entrepreneur, Susanne became far more successful than her mother and died in 1838 leaving an estate of $61,600 (equivalent to $1,500,000 in 2009 currency).

Modern archaeological work at the site of Coincoin's farmstead is documenting some of the aspects of her domestic life. A mid-nineteenth century dwelling, now dubbed the Coincoin-Prudhomme House although it was not the actual site of her residence, commemorates her within the Cane River National Heritage Area. Popular lore also has, erroneously, credited her with the ownership of a Cane River plantation founded by her son Louis Metoyer, known today as Melrose Plantation, and its historic buildings Yucca House and African House. Her eldest half-French son, Nicolas Augustin Métoyer, founded St. Augustine Parish (Isle Brevelle) Church, the spiritual center of Cane River's large community of Creoles of color who trace their heritage to Coincoin.

=== Eulalie de Mandéville ===
There were many other examples of white Creole fathers who reared and carefully and quietly placed their daughters of color with the sons of known friends or family members. This occurred with Eulalie de Mandéville, the elder half-sister of color to the eccentric nobleman, politician, and land developer Bernard Xavier de Marigny de Mandéville. Taken from her enslaved mother as a baby, and partly raised by a white grandmother, 22-year-old Eulalie was "placed" by her father, Count Pierre Enguerrand Philippe, Écuyer de Mandéville, Sieur de Marigny, with Eugène de Macarty, a member of the famous French-Irish clan in 1796. Their alliance resulted in five children and lasted almost fifty years.

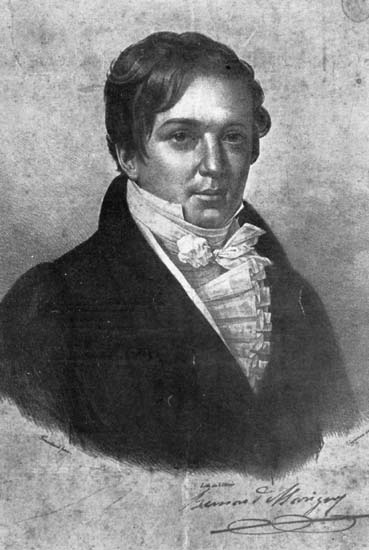
Portrait of Bernard de Marigny, flamboyant Creole millionaire and the half-brother of Eulalie de Mandéville de Macarty

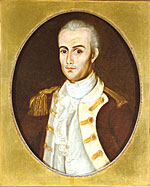
Portrait of Augustin de Macarty, military man, mayor of New Orleans, and brother of Eugène de Macarty

In contrast to the Macartys' stable relationship, Eugène's brother Augustin de Macarty was married and was said to have had numerous, complex affairs with Creole women of color. When he died, several women made claims on behalf of their children against his estate.

On his deathbed in 1845, Eugène de Macarty married Eulalie. He willed her all of his money and property, then worth $12,000. His white relatives, including his niece, Marie Delphine de Macarty LaLaurie, contested the will. The court upheld his will. After Eulalie's death, their surviving children defeated another attempt by Macarty's relatives to claim his estate, by then worth more than $150,000. Eulalie de Mandéville de Macarty became a successful marchande and ran a dairy. She died in 1848.

=== Rosette Rochon ===
Rosette Rochon was born in 1767 in colonial Mobile, the daughter of Pierre Rochon, a shipbuilder from a Québécois family (family name was Rocheron in Québec), and his mulâtresse slave-consort Marianne, who bore him five other children. Once Rosette reached a suitable age, she became the consort of a Monsieur Hardy, with whom she relocated to the colony of Saint Domingue. During her sojourn there, Hardy must have died or relinquished his relationship with her; for in 1797 during the Haitian Revolution, she escaped to New Orleans, where she later became the placée of Joseph Forstal and then after his death, Charles Populus, both wealthy white New Orleans Creoles.

Rochon came to speculate in real estate in the French Quarter; she eventually owned rental property, opened grocery stores, made loans, bought and sold mortgages, and owned and rented out (hired out) slaves. She also traveled extensively back and forth to Haiti, where her son by Hardy had become a government official in the new republic. Her social circle in New Orleans once included Marie Laveau, Jean Lafitte, and the free black contractors and real estate developers Jean-Louis Doliolle and his brother Joseph Doliolle.

In particular, Rochon became one of the earliest investors in the Faubourg Marigny, acquiring her first lot from Bernard de Marigny in 1806. Bernard de Marigny, the Creole speculator, refused to sell the lots he was subdividing from his family plantation to anyone who spoke English. While this turned out to be a losing financial decision, Marigny felt more comfortable with the French-speaking, Catholic free people of color (having relatives, lovers, and even children on this side of the color line). Consequently, much of Faubourg Marigny was built by free black artisans for free people of color or for French-speaking white Creoles. Rochon remained largely illiterate, dying in 1863 at the age of 96, leaving behind an estate valued at $100,000 (today, an estate worth a million dollars).

=== Marie Laveau ===
Marie Laveau (also spelled Leveau, Laveaux), known as the voodoo queen of New Orleans, was born between 1795 and 1801 as the daughter of a mulatto business owner, Charles Leveaux, and his mixed Black and Native American placée Marguerite Darcantel (or D'Arcantel).

At 17, Marie married a Creole man of color popularly known as Jacques Paris (however, in some documents, he is known as Santiago Paris). Paris either died, disappeared or deliberately abandoned her (some accounts also relate that he was a merchant seaman or sailor in the navy) after she produced a daughter. Laveau was styling herself as the Widow Paris and was a hairdresser for white matrons (she was also reckoned to be an herbalist and yellow fever nurse) when she met Louis-Christophe Dumesnil de Glapion and in the early 1820s, they became lovers.

Marie was just beginning her spectacular career as a voodoo practitioner (she would not be declared a "queen" until about 1830), and Dumesnil de Glapion was a fiftyish white Creole veteran of the Battle of New Orleans with relatives on both sides of the color line. It has been alleged that Dumesnil de Glapion was so in love with Marie, he refused to live separately from his placée according to racial custom. In an unusual decision, Dumesnil de Glapion passed as a man of color to live with her under respectable circumstances—thus explaining the confusion many historians have had whether he was truly white or black. Although it is popularly thought that Marie presented Dumesnil de Glapion with fifteen children, only five are listed in vital statistics and of these, two daughters—one the famous Marie Euchariste or Marie Leveau II—lived to adulthood. Marie Euchariste closely resembled her mother and startled many who thought that Marie Leveau had been resurrected by the black arts, or could be at two places at once, beliefs that the daughter did little to correct.

== Quadroon balls ==
The term quadroon is a fractional term referring to a person with one white and one mulatto parent, some courts would have considered one-fourth Black. The "quadroon balls" were social events designed to encourage mixed-race women to form liaisons with wealthy white men through a system of concubinage known as plaçage.

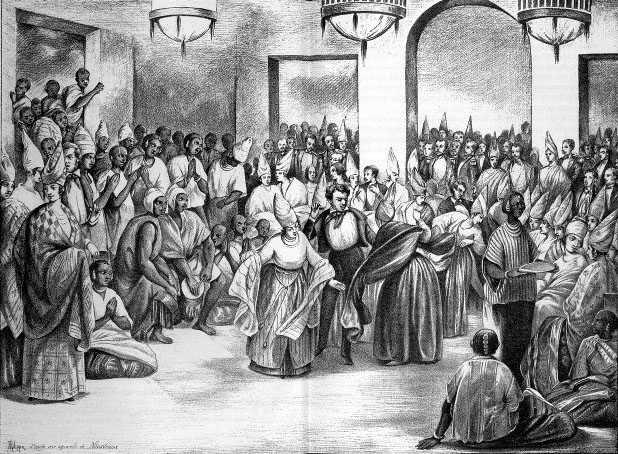
Depiction of a signare ball in colonial Saint-Louis, Senegal

=== Quadroon Balls of Saint Domingue ===
The origin of quadroon balls can be traced to the redoutes des filles de couleur in Cap-Français in the French colony of Saint Domingue.

In the French colony, the male population outnumbered women, white women were few, and there were few alternatives to prostitution for free women of color. The colony was known in the Caribbean for its "mulatto courtesans", whose trademark was elegance, a haughty demeanor, and the demand to be courted. As there were no brothels in the colony and sex workers worked independently, these balls were the place where the most exclusive courtesans met their clients. Having met, they were set up as the official housekeeper (menagère) or openly kept as mistresses. When their male client died or left to settle in France for their retirement, they were normally left with money, property, or slaves for their future support. This was a common background for free colored businesswomen, among whom the most famous were Nanette Pincemaille (d. 1784), Anne Laporte (d. 1783), Simone Brocard, and Julie Dahey.

Many refugees from Saint-Domingue came to New Orleans and settled after the outbreak of the Haitian Revolution in 1791 until the Dominguan refuge colony in Cuba was ousted in 1809. These were white, black, and free people of color who were used to the plaçage system in Saint Domingue and who introduced a more formalized form of plaçage as well as the famous quadroon balls to New Orleans.

=== Quadroon Balls of New Orleans ===
Monique Guillory writes about quadroon balls that took place in New Orleans, the city most strongly associated with these events. She approaches the balls in context of the history of a building the structure of which is now the Bourbon Orleans Hotel. Inside is the Orleans Ballroom, a legendary, if not entirely factual, location for the earliest quadroon balls.

In 1805, Albert Tessier, a refugee from Saint-Domingue, began renting a dance hall in New Orleans where he threw twice weekly dances for free quadroon women and white men only. This was an innovation in New Orleans at the time: balls for free women of colour had been held in New Orleans in the 1790s, but they had been opened for both white men and free men of colour, the latter of whom could marry the women rather than form a placage with them, and these new balls exclusively for free quadroon women and white men was therefore more closely associated with the placage system, introducing a Dominguan custom to New Orleans.

The quadroon balls were elegant and elaborate, designed to appeal to wealthy white men. Although race mixing was prohibited by New Orleans law, it was common for white gentleman to attend the balls, sometimes stealing away from white balls to mingle with the city's quadroon female population. The principal desire of quadroon women attending these balls was to become placée as the mistress of a wealthy gentleman, usually a young white Creole or a visiting European. These arrangements were a common occurrence, Guillory suggests, because the highly educated, socially refined quadroons were prohibited from marrying white men and were unlikely to find Black men of their own status.

A quadroon's mother usually negotiated with an admirer the compensation that would be received for having the woman as his mistress. Typical terms included some financial payment to the parent, financial and/or housing arrangements for the quadroon herself, and, many times, paternal recognition of any children the union produced. Guillory points out that some of these matches were as enduring and exclusive as marriages. A beloved quadroon mistress had the power to destabilize white marriages and families, something she was much resented for.

According to Guillory, the system of plaçage had a basis in the economics of mixed race. The plaçage of black women with white lovers, Guillory writes, could take place only because of the socially determined value of their light skin, the same light skin that commanded a higher price on the slave block, where light skinned girls fetched much higher prices than did prime field hands. Guillory posits the quadroon balls as the best among severely limited options for these near-white women, a way for them to control their sexuality and decide the price of their own bodies. She contends: "The most a mulatto mother and a quadroon daughter could hope to attain in the rigid confines of the black/white world was some semblance of economic independence and social distinction from the slaves and other blacks".

She notes that many participants in the balls were successful in actual businesses when they could no longer rely on an income from the plaçage system. She speculates they developed business acumen from the process of marketing their own bodies.

== Genetic legacy ==
According to Suarez-Kurtz, there is genetic evidence for the impact of plaçage in New Orleans. African Americans in New Orleans have significantly higher European ancestry than African Americans residing in the northern United States. Furthermore, they note that African Americans from New Orleans have the highest rate of European male haplogroups, with 47% of New Orleans black men carrying a European haplogroup, the rest carrying African haplogroups. This supports the historical record of higher intermarriages between white men and black women in New Orleans and the south.

== Treatment in fiction ==
- Isabel Allende, Island Beneath the Sea. A novel about a mixed-race slave who is brought to Saint-Domingue and is eventually taken to New Orleans with her master's family. Her quadroon daughter is introduced to society as a placée.
- George Washington Cable, The Grandissimes, A Story of Creole Life (1880). He also wrote the short stories "Títe Poulette", "Madame John's Legacy" and "Madame Delphine", which portrayed the placée as societal outcast.
- William Faulkner, Absalom, Absalom!. A young man is engaged to a woman until it is found out that he is already involved with a placée in New Orleans and has a child with her.
- Edna Ferber, Saratoga Trunk. The book was later adapted as a film by the same name, starring Ingrid Bergman and Gary Cooper.
- Marcus Gardley, The House That Will Not Stand premiered at Berkeley Repertory Theatre, 31 January – 16 March 2014.
- Barbara Hambly, The Benjamin January Mysteries. This series of novels features Benjamin January, a free man of color, in New Orleans in the 1830s. His mother and half-sister are also featured; both are placées. His wife is the daughter of a placée.
- Barbara Ferry Johnson's 1977 best-selling romance novel, Delta Blood, is about placée Leah Bonvivier, and her wealthy Creole lover Baptiste Fontaine.
- Beyoncé Knowles, in her "Formation" music video, features visuals of placées. This song was released 6 February 2016.
- Anne Rice, The Feast of All Saints. A coming of age novel about a young man making his way in Creole New Orleans. It was adapted as a film by the same name.
- Sarah Riggs (screenplay), R.B. McGowen Jr. (story): Quadroon – 1971 film following preparation of prostitutes for presentation at the annual Quadroon Ball set in 1835 New Orleans.
- Patricia Vaughn, Shadows on the Bayou. A historical romance following the life of Sylvia Dupont, a young woman raised to be a placée. Dupont marries a free man of color and struggles with the consequences.
- "Haunting of the Octoroon Mistress", a folktale featuring the institutions of octoroon balls and plaçage.
- The Courage to Love – a 2000 TV movie on the founder of the Sisters of the Holy Family, featuring Diahann Carroll as a placée and Vanessa Williams as her daughter, Henriette Delille, struggling with the thought of also becoming a placée.
- The video game Assassin's Creed III: Liberation features a protagonist, Aveline de Grandpre, who is a free woman of color in 1760s New Orleans, the daughter of a French merchant and his placée.

== See also ==
- Children of the plantation
- Concubinage
- Courtesan
- Hypergamy
- Inter-caste marriage
- Slave marriages in the United States
- Marriage à la façon du pays
- Morganatic marriage
- Signare
- Tobacco brides
- Fancy girls
