= Charles Rochon =

Charles Rochon (4 or 5 July 1673 – 1733) was a French colonist and was one of the four founders of modern-day Mobile, Alabama.

== Life and career ==
Rochon was born in 1673 in Quebec to Simon Rochon and Mathurine Buisson in Boucherville. His mother was the sister of the missionary Jean-François Buisson de Saint-Cosme. He became a fur trapper and was associated with Henri de Tonti, accompanying him on many of his expeditions. In 1701 he came to colonial Louisiana, and he was a colonist at the settlement of Fort Louis De Mobile located at modern-day Axis, Alabama, an area of habitation that preceded the modern-day city of Mobile.

In 1706, along with Pierre LeBoeuf, Gilbert Dardenne and Claude Parent, Rochon left the settlement at Axis, moving down to a site at the mouth of the Mobile River, the site of present-day Mobile. The success that the four had at this site was a contributing factor to the relocation of Mobile from the site at Axis to its present site in 1711.

After the city was moved to the Mobile River site, Charles Rochon again moved, this time to a site at the mouth of the Dog River, where he established a plantation that remained in the hands of his descendants until 1848. The plantation encompassed the majority of what is today known as Hollinger's Island. Rochon remained at this plantation until his death in 1733

== Family ==
Charles Rochon was married to Henriette Colon, the half-Indian (Kaskaskia) daughter of Old Mobile settler Jean Baptiste (dit "LaViolette") Colon, as well as being the goddaughter of Henri de Tonti. They had several children, but only two survived past 1733. Their son, Louis Augustin, established a plantation on the eastern shore of Mobile Bay that became the modern-day Spanish Fort.

Rochon has had a number of notable descendants in the Gulf Coast region including, but not limited to:

- Hale Boggs, U.S. Congressman from Louisiana, House Majority Leader, 5th great-grandson
- Cokie Roberts, Television journalist, 6th great-granddaughter
- Barbara Boggs Sigmund, 1980's mayor of Princeton, New Jersey, 6th great-granddaughter
- Judge Roy Hofheinz, 1965 builder of the Astrodome, Owner of Houston Astros, Mayor of Houston, 5th Great-Grandson
- Connie Bea Hope, Mobile, Alabama cook, television host and socialite, 5th great-granddaughter
- Rosette Rochon, noted placée, businesswoman, and free person of color in antebellum New Orleans, granddaughter
- Valerie Jarrett, a Senior Adviser on Public Information and Intergovernmental Affairs to U.S. President Barack Obama, is a great-granddaughter of Victor Rochon
- John Hainkel, former Speaker of Louisiana House of Representatives and president of the Louisiana Senate
- Suzanne Malveaux, American television news journalist, 7th great-granddaughter
