= Rosette Rochon =

American businesswoman

Rosette Rochon (1767–1863) was an American placée and businesswoman, who was an important figure in the Gens de couleur libres society of New Orleans. She belonged to the most famous of the placées of New Orleans alongside Eulalie de Mandéville and Marie Thérèse Metoyer, and made a fortune on investments in dry goods, cattle, banking, slave trade and real estate business.

== Life ==
She was born in 1767 in colonial Mobile, one of five children to the daughter of Pierre Rochon, a shipbuilder from a Québécois family (family name was Rocheron in Québec), and his mixed race slave-consort Marianne.

=== Placée ===
Once Rosette reached a suitable age, she became the placée of a Monsieur Hardy, with whom she relocated to the colony of Saint Domingue. During her sojourn there, Hardy must have died or relinquished his relationship with her; for in 1797 during the Haitian Revolution, she escaped to New Orleans, where she later became the placée of Joseph Forstal and Charles Populus, both wealthy white New Orleans Creoles.

=== Business activity ===
Rochon came to speculate in real estate in the French Quarter; she eventually owned rental property, opened grocery stores, made loans, bought and sold mortgages, and owned and rented out (hired out) slaves. She also traveled extensively back and forth to Haiti, where her son by Hardy had become a government official in the new republic. Her social circle in New Orleans once included Marie Laveau, Jean Lafitte, and the free black contractors and real estate developers Jean-Louis Doliolle and his brother Joseph Doliolle.

In particular, Rochon became one of the earliest investors in the Faubourg Marigny, acquiring her first lot from Bernard de Marigny in 1806. Bernard de Marigny, the Creole speculator, refused to sell the lots he was subdividing from his family plantation to anyone who spoke English. While this turned out to be a losing financial decision, Marigny felt more comfortable with the French-speaking, Catholic free people of color (having relatives, lovers, and even children on this side of the color line). Consequently, much of Faubourg Marigny was built by free black artisans for free people of color or for French-speaking white Creoles. Rochon remained largely illiterate, dying in 1863 at the age of 96, leaving behind an estate valued at $100,000 (today, an estate worth a million dollars).
