= Buffalo Lake (Alberta) =

Lake in Camrose County, Alberta, Canada

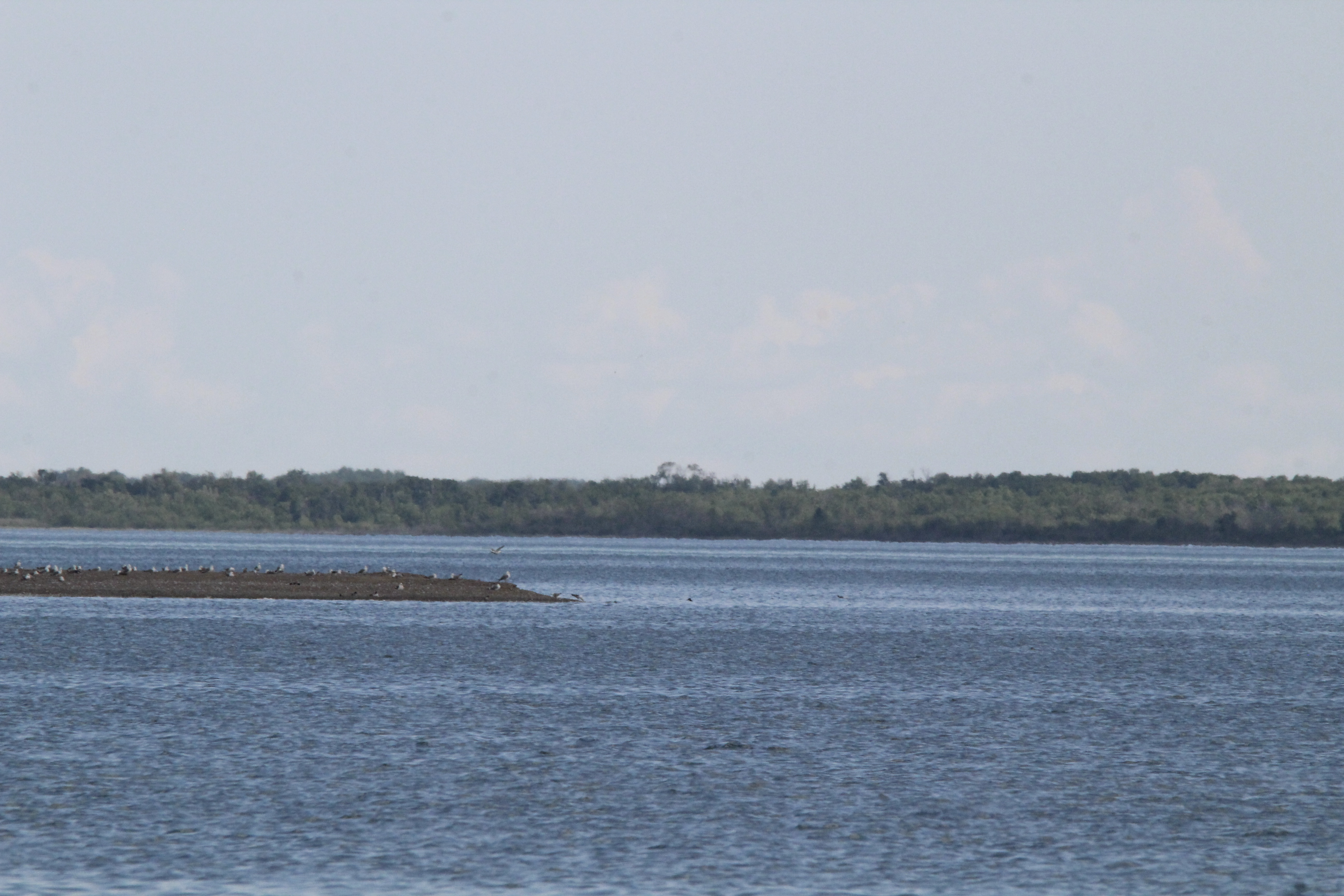
- Buffalo Lake, with Bird Island seen on the left

- Location within Alberta Location within Canada
- Location: Central Alberta
- Coordinates: 52°29′33″N 112°54′56″W
- Type: Mesotrophic
- Part of: South Saskatchewan River
- Primary inflows: Parlby Creek
- Primary outflows: Tail Creek
- Catchment area: 1,440 km^{2} (560 sq mi)
- Basin countries: Canada
- Max. length: 17 km (11 mi)
- Max. width: 7.5 km (4.7 mi)
- Surface area: 9,350 ha (23,100 acres)
- Average depth: 2.8 m (9 ft 2 in)
- Max. depth: 6.5 m (21 ft)
- Surface elevation: 785 m (2,575 ft)
- Islands: Tony's Island; Bird Island
- Settlements: Bashaw; Rochon Sands; Mirror; White Sands

Buffalo Lake is a large lake in central Alberta, Canada. It is located in at the limit between Camrose County, the County of Stettler No. 6 and Lacombe County, approximately 55 kilometres (34 mi) east of the city of Red Deer. The lake's levels are actively managed as water is pumped in from the Red Deer River via Parlby Creek. Buffalo Lake was part of a proposed — but never implemented — large scale irrigation project originally devised by William Pearce in 1920.

The recreational areas of Boss Hill, Rochon Sands, White Sands, Scenic Sands, Buffalo Sands. Pelican Point, Pelican View Estates (PVE), and The Narrows are established on the shores of the lake, as is the Rochon Sands Provincial Park.

== Description ==
The lake lies in the Red Deer River basin, and has a water surface of 9,350 hectares (23,100 acres) and a drainage basin of 1,440 km^{2} (560 sq mi).

The lake has three main bays. The Main Bay is 6.5 metres (21 ft) at its deepest point and has two islands. Secondary Bay is smaller, and has one large island which is privately owned. Parlby Bay, also known as Mirror Bay, is much smaller than the other bays and has Parlby Creek flowing into it.

Buffalo Lake is unique in Alberta in that it is actively "managed" via actively controlled inflow pumped in from the Red Deer River via Parlby Creek, and outflow back into the Red Deer River via Tail Creek. Due to the lake's shallowness and lack of natural outflows, its water level used to fluctuate more than other lakes, so projects to manage the lake's water level were built and began operation in 1996.

== Historical irrigation project ==
In 1920, William Pearce produced a report for Canada's Department of Reclamation Services that outlined a flood and drought mitigation project for Alberta and Saskatchewan, part of which involved diverting water from the North Saskatchewan River watershed to the Red Deer River near Rocky Mountain House. The report was reviewed for feasibility in 1945 by the Prairie Farm Rehabilitation Administration (PFRA). The proposed project involved the construction of a dam across the Red Deer near Content Bridge and the building of a 128-kilometre (80 mi) long canal from the dam to Buffalo Lake. This would raise Buffalo Lake 6 metres (20 ft) turning it into a large reservoir. Water would then be distributed from the reservior to drought-prone areas. The project was never initiated.

== Fish species ==
Fish commonly found in Buffalo Lake include northern pike and burbot.

== See also ==
- List of lakes of Alberta
