= Eulalie de Mandéville =

American businesswoman

- Born: 1774
- Died: 1848 (aged 73–74)
- Occupation: Businessperson

Eulalie de Mandéville also known as Cécée MacCarty (1774–1848) was an American businesswoman. She has been called the 'most successful free mulatto businesswoman' in the Antebellum South.

Eulalie de Mandeville was born in New Orleans, the daughter of Count Pierre Enguerrand Philippe, Écuyer de Mandéville, Sieur de Marigny, and Marie Jeannette, a woman he enslaved, who was originally from Congo. At her birth, Eulalie and her mother Jeannette were manumitted. Eulalie was raised in the household of Françoise Delille de Marigny, Pierre de Marigny's mother, and grew up alongside her half-siblings, including Bernard de Marigny. The courtship between Eulalie and Eugène de MacCarty, a member of a prominent French-Irish family in New Orleans, was overseen by her father and paternal grandmother in the 1790s. They entered into a plaçage relationship in 1796, while New Orleans was still under Spanish control. From 1808, they lived together in a house on the corner of Dauphine and Barracks Street in New Orleans. The couple had five children between 1794 and 1815, one daughter and two sons, who were all baptised at New Orleans's St. Louis Cathedral and given MacCarty's name.

As a respected member of the Marigny family, Eulalie was given assets in the form of money, slaves, cattle, and land in the St. Bernard Parish, downriver from New Orleans when she was a young woman. Later, her brother Bernard would give her a large plot of land in the Faubourg Marigny and provide the lumber needed for her to build rental properties there. With these assets, Eulalie established a dairy and a dry goods business, and she sold and leased property. Her import business distributed manufactured goods from New Orleans to retail outlets as far away as Attakapas. This was very lucrative, and she invested her money in stocks, real estate and discounted banknotes, as well as lending her money at high interest through Eugene MacCarty's brokerage, accumulating a fortune worth $155,000.229 ($4.69 million in 2025) in 1830. At her death, her estate was valued at $250,000 ($8.64 million in 2025), and she was listed among the wealthiest black entrepreneurs in the United States between 1820 and 1865.

She was the owner of 32 slaves, and as such she was the largest slaveholder among the free people of color in New Orleans; however, she enslaved far fewer people than the Black slave owning planters outside of the city borders, among whom were the sugar planters Ricaud, mother Madame Cyprian Ricard and son Pierre Ricard, who in 1860 owned 152 slaves and an estate worth $221,500.

She and Eugène de MacCarty were married in a religious ceremony at St. Augustine's Catholic Church shortly before his death in 1845. When he died, she inherited $12,000 from his estate. The relatives of her late husband—among them his brother Nicolas Theodore Macarty and Delphine LaLaurie—questioned his will, claiming that the only relatives of color who could inherit under the American Civil Code of 1825—enacted after the couple had entered into their formal relationship—were his children, and even then they could receive no more than 10% of a father's assets. Furthermore, the Macartys questioned whether the personal fortune of Eulalie de Marigny de Mandéville (at that time worth $3 million) should in fact be classified as part of the property of Eugene de MacCarty, claiming he had transferred much of his property to her prior to his death with the intent to defraud the legal heirs. Enoul Livaudais, Eulalie's uncle-by-marriage, and her half-brother Bernard de Marigny testified on her behalf in court, and the court found in favor of Eulalie, pointing out that the bulk of Eulalie's wealth had been acquired before her legal marriage to MacCarty. The Supreme Court of Louisiana ruled against the Macartys again in 1848, the year of Eulalie's death, writing that, "No doubt parental love, the strongest tie on earth, suggested to both of them that their own children were better entitled to inherit the proceeds of their labor than collateral heirs for whom they felt little or no regard.”
