= Rochon Sands Provincial Park =

Provincial park in Alberta, Canada

Coordinates: 52°27′39″N 112°53′15″W

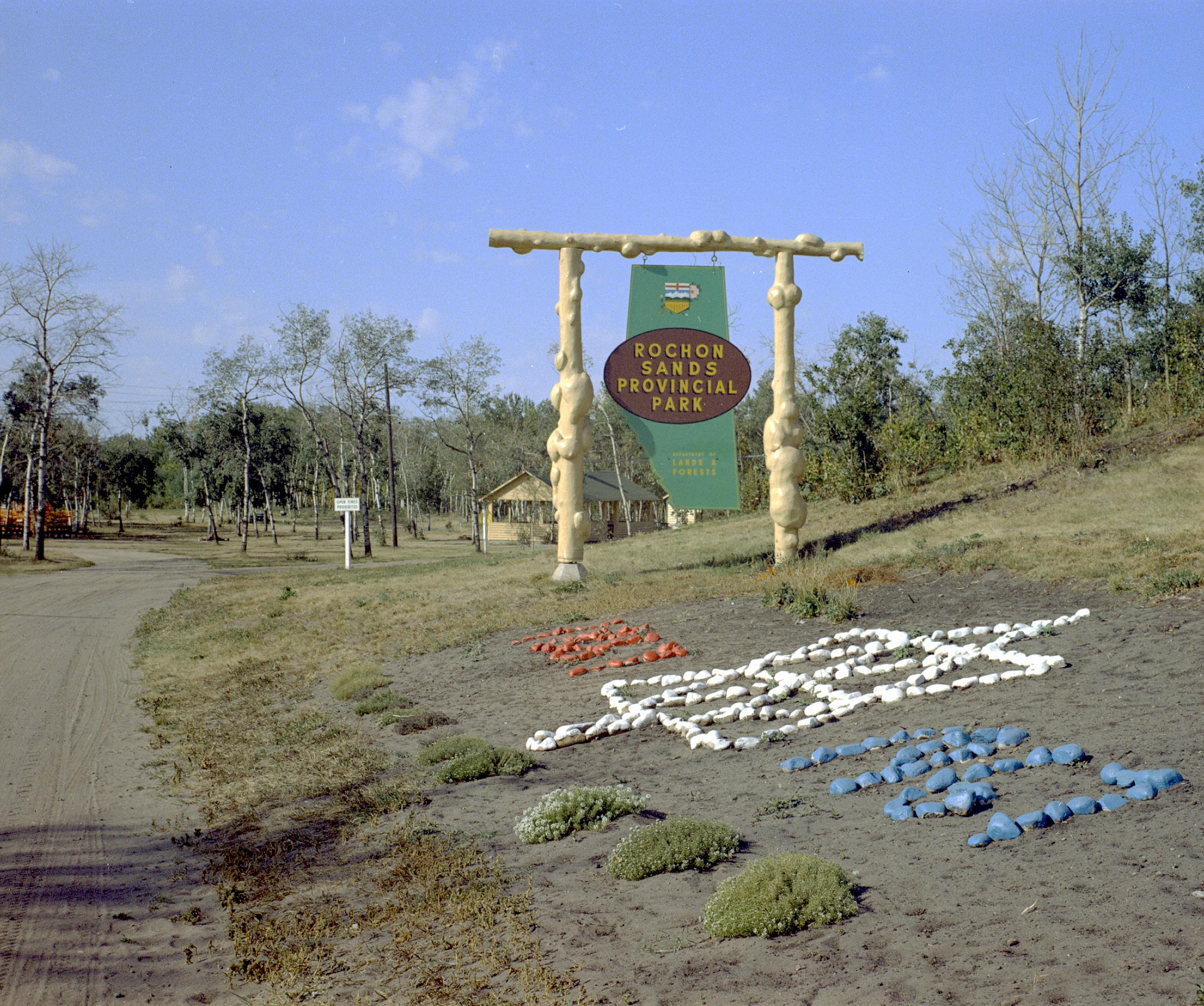
- Rochon Sands Provincial Park, 1967
- Interactive map of Rochon Sands Provincial Park
- Type: Provincial park
- Location: 1 Bay View St, Rochon Sands, AB T0C 3B0, Canada
- Area: 295.25 Acres

Rochon Sands Provincial Park is a provincial park that is in Alberta, Canada. It is located on the south shore of Buffalo Lake, within the summer village of Rochon Sands, which operates the park under a lease agreement with the province of Alberta. This provincial park can be accessed by traveling northeast from Red Deer on Highway 11, or northwest from Stettler on Highway 12, and secondary Highway 835. The park was established on January 8, 1957.

It has a campground and playground, along with many other activities that are available to the public.
