= Coartación (slavery) =

System allowing a slave to buy their freedom

Coartación was a system of self-paid manumission in Ibero-American slave societies during the sixteenth to nineteenth centuries. It enabled slaves to make a down payment and to set the price for their freedom, conferring on them the status of coartado, which brought extra rights and privileges to the slave. The term originally comes from the Spanish word "coartar" as meaning "to cut off" or "limit" how they would set the price for freedom and cut it off from the (rising) market price, so that the master could not ask for a higher price. But by the eighteenth century, it had become "coartación" as meaning "hindrance" or "restriction," in reference to the action of restricting the slave master's power.

== Origins ==
Slavery in Spanish America was based on the Siete Partidas legal code of 1348. While this code made clear that “all laws of the world should lead towards freedom,” it did not directly address manumission. Under Ancient Roman laws, which influenced the European laws regarding slavery, slaves were allowed to buy their own freedom using their Peculium, as meaning their private proceeds, but this was rare.

The Siete Partidas did incorporate the rights of slaves to acquire a peculium, although the use of these to purchase freedom began as a custom rather a facet of the law. These customs developed as a result of the slaves themselves whose early efforts to petition the courts resulted in its acceptance by the Spanish as a customary right. Before Cuba's development of plantation slavery, slaves often played large roles in the service economy as laborers and artisans. Through social interaction, these slaves learned of Spanish law that allowed slaves to report mistreatment by their masters to authorities, thus establishing their relationship with the courts. It appears that these customs were already in effect in Spanish America by the sixteenth century. A population count from Málaga, Spain recorded some people as "cortados," while the 1729 Dictionary of the Spanish Royal academy defined the word "cortarse" to be the process by which slaves would negotiate their freedom with their masters by limiting their price of freedom.

Additionally, in 1766 Spain issued a cedula (an edict) proclaiming that the alcabala tax on sales would be collected in certain cases of coartación. Coartación was not officially put into Cuban law until 1842. In the years preceding the Reglamento de Esclavos (Slave Rules) of 1842, masters had been trying to curb the practice of coartación which they saw as an affront to the institution of slavery. But with the British abolitionist movement becoming an increasingly strong force, Governor Valdés made the proclamation despite the masters. Masters continued to protest the Reglamento, blaming it for the conspiracy of La Escalera. While the courts did try to review certain articles from the proclamation, especially the article that allowed slaves to change masters at will, they ultimately decided in 1862 to uphold all parts of the law. In 1871, the governor did establish that rural slaves could not change masters at will, but by this time eastern Cuba had erupted in an anti-colonial revolt which threatened the whole slave system.

== Process ==
The slave would begin by fixing the price of his or her freedom with the master in the presence of the court and paying a substantial portion of it, which would then draw up a certificate identifying the slave as the new designation, coartado. This process could be complicated, however, as several different appraisers could be used who would come up with wildly different estimations of value. The coartado would then usually pay installments over a period of time until reaching the full price for freedom. The setting of an unchangeable price was paramount in this process. If a coartado was bought by another master, the value of the coartado stayed the same minus whatever the coartado had already paid off. While a prospective buyer could pay more than the current price, this was rarely done because it would put the buyer at a financial disadvantage. Once a coartado had paid the full price, they would be issued cartas de libertad coartado (letters of freedom), though historians believe that cartas de libertad venta were also letters of freedom achieved through coartación from which the coartado had already made substantial payments, since the evidence shows that those who received the cartas de libertad venta had had to pay a price well below market price. These coartados most likely paid their share to the master outside of the official court.

Slaves were able to accumulate some amount of money and property. Although the Siete Partidas specifically barred slaves from owning property, courts usually upheld these rights as a custom. In urban areas, slaves could be hired out for other jobs, and rural slaves could own small plots of land called conucos on which they could raise a small amount of crops and livestock. Some masters considered conucos essential for keeping the peace and ensuring the continuation of slavery. Slaves could also obtain the money for coartación through assistance from a third party.

== Rights of a Coartado ==
Along with the promise of freedom, the status of coartado conferred certain rights above that of a normal slave. Once a slave was made a coartado, they could not be demoted back to the status as a slave. Once they became a coartado, they would remain so unless they completed the payments to achieve freedom. Some coartados actually purposely failed to pay the full price for freedom, instead making small incremental payments to obtain the increased benefits of being a coartado while also ensuring the security of a steady living situation. Because the coartado was still technically a slave, the master would have to continue his support. This strategy might have been used because of the rental benefits. If a coartado were hired out, they would be entitled to a percent of the price of the rental, with the notion being that the coartado owns part of the “property” that is being rented. The coartado also had increased rights regarding changing masters. While slaves could already petition to change on the account of severe abuse, coartados could do so without demonstrating a cause. This right, however, was severely threatened by masters who often succeeded in subverting this right in court.

== Comparisons to other systems ==
=== Coartación in Ibero-America ===
Coartación never seems to have reached the same level of importance throughout Ibero-America as it did in its original country of Cuba. Studies conducted in Mexico, Peru, Argentina, Spanish Louisiana and Brazil reveal that while it was practiced in those areas, only in Minas Gerais and Buenos Aires was coartación the primary way of achieving freedom. A substantial number of blacks from Haiti (a French colony) arrived as refugees to Spanish Louisiana because of this.

In Brazil, the process was different from that in Cuba. Most importantly, there is no evidence that Brazilian quartados received any special rights or status before paying the full price for freedom. They were unable to switch masters without cause or accept a percentage of the price for their rent when hired out. This would have especially affected Brazilian quartados since the negro de ganho, a slave who would work several different jobs and collect a small fee, was an important facet of slavery in Brazil. This was a primary way for Brazilian slaves to raise a peculium. Another difference is in beginning the process. In Brazil, quartados were usually designated by the master, rather than in Cuba where the slave initiated the process.

=== Other systems ===
Although they existed, opportunities for manumission in other European colonies were rare when compared to Spanish and Portuguese ones. Slave codes such as the Code Noir outlined restrictions for manumission, while self-purchase never became a feasible tool for slaves to gain their freedom due to the lack of opportunities to earn enough money to buy themselves out of slavery. In the American South, planters did not want slaves to be able to use the law for their own benefit. Slaves were barred from prosecuting for themselves or for others in court and their testimony was inadmissible on principle, unless taken from them via torture. By default, courts were essentially never utilized in manumission. Across American slave societies, women gained manumission more often than men, and gradual abolition placed them at the center of courtroom struggles in Rio and Havana due to the repetition of the trend. The difference in access to manumission for the Cuban and United States slave would have also depended on the labor structure. U.S. slaves were used primarily for field work, a variable market, while many Cuban slaves were also skilled laborers in other areas.

== Gender ==
While there were fewer female slaves than male slaves, women accounted for 55 and 67 percent of all manumissions in Ibero-America. There are several reasons for this difference. First, female slaves were generally valued less than male slaves, and their ability to obtain outside employment as seamstresses, wet nurses, cooks or prostitutes increased their chances of being able to pay the full price of freedom. Second, slave mothers’ relationship with their children contributed to this difference. There was an added incentive for mothers to achieve freedom, as only children born of slave mothers would be considered slaves under Spanish law and children would be much more likely to pay for the freedom of their mother than that of their father. This process, however, was heavily contested in Cuban courts as they began to define coartación as something so personal it could not be transferred, a principle that was upheld by the royal cédula of 1789. Third, women often had a closer relationship with their masters. Occasions of sexual relations between slave women and their masters could result in increased chances for freedom, but also female slaves often did household work and had more personal interactions with the master than the male slaves outside.

This divide was not always consistent, however. In eighteenth century Bahia, Brazil, females made up a much larger proportion of manumissions due to the expansion of the sugar economy and gold mining which necessitated a much larger labor force of males. In Cuba, however, it was closer to equal between the rates of male or female manumission, most likely because it rarely encountered a labor shortage.

== Other factors ==
Urban slaves were also much more likely to become coartados than rural slaves. One reason is that it was easier for urban slaves to obtain money from outside jobs in order to make the down payment. The effect of urbanization on coartación was linked with gender in that the majority of female slaves who achieved freedom were also largely from urban households. Since there was such a large number proportion of female slaves in urban areas, these women were able to interact and see what freedom looked like and how it could be achieved, which drove them to seek legal assistance. However; by the 1860s, many rural Cuban slaves had learned about the possibilities of coartación and began to initiate the process in the courts.

Generally, Creoles (American-born slaves) had better chances of becoming coartados, just as mixed-race slaves were more likely than black slaves. This is likely the result of better access to resources and proximity to the master. Many Creoles who had knowledge of the system also gave small sums of money on the birth of their child to ease their path to freedom.

== Impact ==
Historian Manuel Barcia notes the importance of coartación as a means for slaves to access courts and shape their lives. Similarly, Historian Alejandro de la Fuente argues that while only a small fraction of slaves in Ibero-America achieved their freedom from coartación, its main significance lay in its ability to reverse the norm in Spanish society, giving slaves the ability to impose something on the masters. It has been argued, as well, that coartación was a means of control by the masters to provide the slaves with an incentive, rather than to risk rebellion.

The popularity of coartación resulted in a large population of free people of color in Spanish America. Free people of color outnumbered slaves in Mexico, Peru, and New Granada by the end of the eighteenth century, and accounted for thirty percent and twenty percent of the population of Salvador and Rio de Janeiro, Brazil, respectively. In general, this was not a destabilizing force on the institution of slavery, and some ex-slaves even owned slaves themselves, though this was rare as most freed people of color remained poor.
