= Rochon Sands =

- Summer village
- Summer Village of Rochon Sands
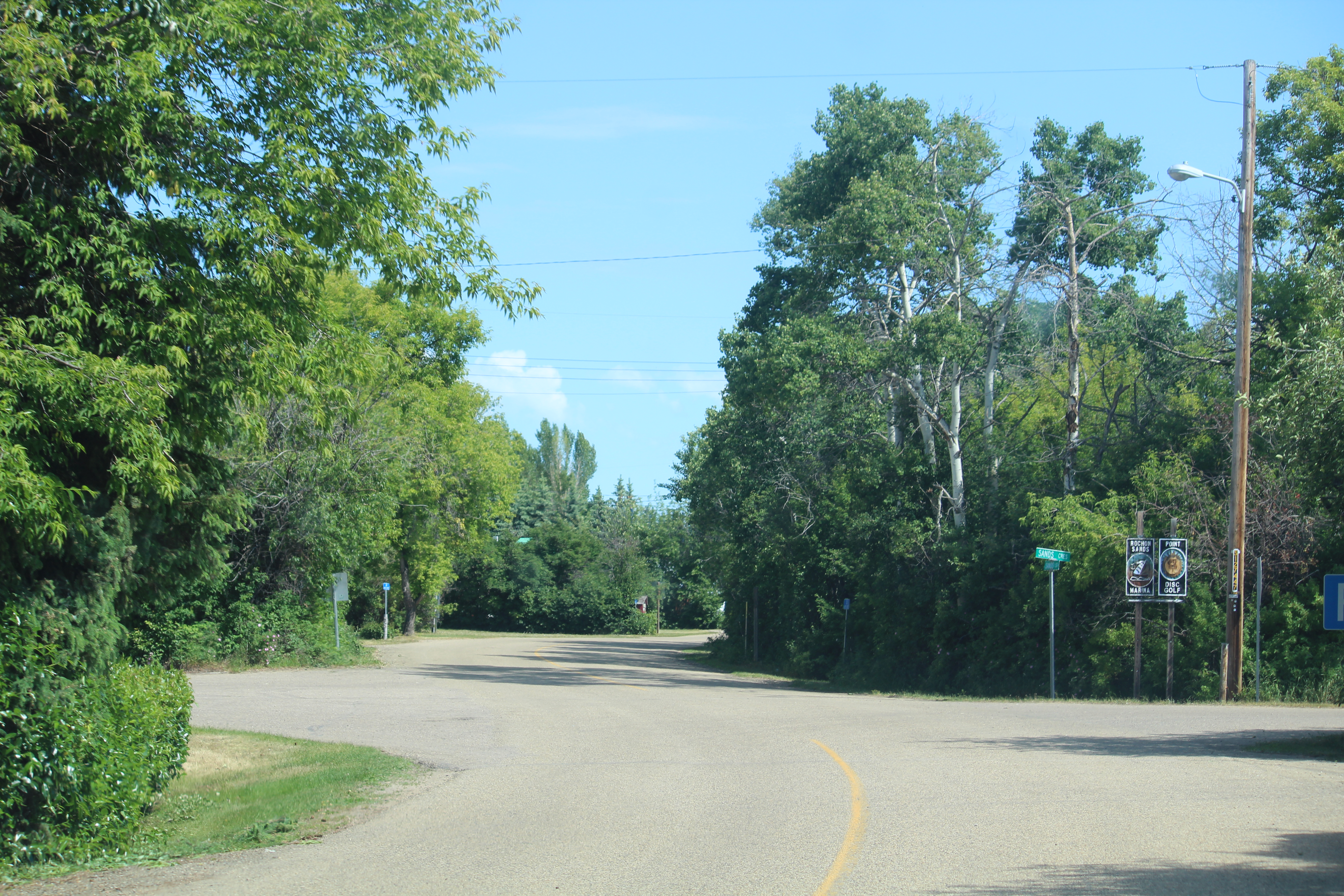
- Sands Street

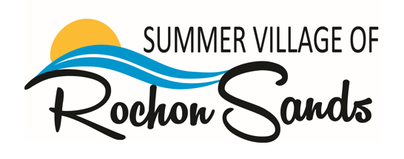
- Logo

- Location of Rochon Sands in Alberta
- Coordinates: 52.45723°N 112.88349°W
- Country: Canada
- Province: Alberta
- Census division: No. 7
- Incorporated: May 17, 1929

Government
  - Type: Municipal incorporation
  - Mayor: Daniel Hiller
  - Governing body: Rochon Sands Summer Village Council

Area (2021)
  - Land: 2.03 km^{2} (0.78 sq mi)

Population (2021)
  - Total: 97
  - Density: 47.7/km^{2} (124/sq mi)
- Time zone: UTC−06:00 (Alberta Time)
- Website: Official website

Rochon Sands (/ˈroʊʃən/) is a summer village on Buffalo Lake in central Alberta, Canada. It is south of Rochon Sands Provincial Park. The summer village and the park take their name from the Rochon family who owned the land in the early 1900s.

== Demographics ==
In the 2021 Census of Population conducted by Statistics Canada, the Summer Village of Rochon Sands had a population of 97 living in 53 of its 156 total private dwellings, a change of 12.8% from its 2016 population of 86. With a land area of 2.03 km^{2} (0.78 sq mi), it had a population density of 47.8/km^{2} (123.8/sq mi) in 2021.

In the 2016 Census of Population conducted by Statistics Canada, the Summer Village of Rochon Sands had a population of 86 living in 47 of its 152 total private dwellings, a 32.3% change from its 2011 population of 65. With a land area of 2.16 km^{2} (0.83 sq mi), it had a population density of 39.8/km^{2} (103.1/sq mi) in 2016.

== See also ==
- List of communities in Alberta
- List of summer villages in Alberta
- List of resort villages in Saskatchewan
