= Big Horn =

Big Horn or Bighorn may refer to:

- Bighorn sheep, a species native to North America

== Places ==
=== Canada ===
- Bighorn, British Columbia
- Bighorn Dam, Alberta
- Bighorn River (Alberta)
- Bighorn Wildland Provincial Park, a proposed park in Alberta
- Big Horn 144A, an Indian reserve in Alberta
- Municipal District of Bighorn No. 8, a municipal district in Alberta

=== United States ===
- Big Horn, Wyoming
- Big Horn County, Montana
- Big Horn County, Wyoming
- Big Horn (Washington), a peak in the state of Washington
- Bighorn Mountain, in Nebraska
- Bighorn Mountains, in Wyoming and Montana
- Bighorn Mountains (California), in San Bernardino County
- Bighorn Basin, in Wyoming and Montana
- Bighorn Canyon National Recreation Area, in Wyoming and Montana
- Bighorn National Forest, in Wyoming
- Bighorn Lake, in Wyoming and Montana
- Big Horn Peak, in Montana
- Bighorn River, in Wyoming and Montana

== Other uses ==
- USS Big Horn (AO-45), a US Navy tanker 1942–1946
- USS Big Horn (T-AO-198), a US Navy fleet replenishment oiler since 1992
- Big Horn, Manchester, a public sculpture in Manchester, England
- Big Horn Academy Building, a school in Cowley, Wyoming, US
- Big Horn Hotel, a demolished historic building in Arminto, Wyoming, US
- The Big Horn, a 1979 album by Houston Person
- Bighorn Airways, an American charter company
- Bighorn Fire, a 2020 wildfire near Tucson, Arizona, US
- Isuzu Bighorn, or Isuzu Trooper, an SUV

== See also ==
- Little Bighorn (disambiguation)
