= Coliseum Mountain =

Mountain peak in Alberta, Canada

- Location within Alberta
- Interactive map of Coliseum Mountain

Highest point
- Elevation: 2,035 m (6,677 ft)
- Prominence: 635 m (2,083 ft)
- Coordinates: 52°30′24″N 116°06′47″W

Naming
- Native name: Yahareskin (Stoney)

Geography
- Location: Nordegg, Alberta, Canada
- Topo map: NTS 83C9 Wapiabi Creek

Climbing
- Easiest route: Coliseum Trail

Coliseum Mountain is a peak north of the town of Nordegg, Alberta, Canada. It is in the David Thompson Country of the Canadian Rockies. It has a summit of 2,035 m (6,677 ft). The mountain was named after its amphitheatre bowl shape resembling the Colosseum of ancient Rome. The Stoney First Nations previously named the peak Yahareskin, meaning "mountain with a cap" because of its bare summit.

== History ==
Coliseum mountain was first mapped by Sir James Hector of the Palliser Expedition in 1858. Martin Nordegg, the founder of the coal mining town of Nordegg, climbed the mountain in 1913.

Forestry Rangers went to the top of Coliseum as early as 1914 to scout the land for forest fires. A mountain fire lookout was built on the peak in 1927, when Nordegg was an up and running coal mining town. Some residents of Nordegg remember climbing up Coliseum to deliver mail to the ranger stationed in the lookout.

The lumber was hauled by packhorses to the top of the mountain to build the lookout tower, the first fire lookout in Alberta. Construction was under the supervision of District Forest Ranger Bill Shankland. The people of Nordegg claim that the fire lookout ranger during the coal mining days of the 1950s, Leo Letourneau, "passed time by turning his telescope on town activities, the children nicknaming him "Old Leo". This lookout has since been moved to the top of Baldy Mountain in the 1955, the neighbouring mountain just west of Coliseum.

== Hiking ==
Coliseum mountain is a popular hike for those traveling to Nordegg and along the David Thompson Highway. The most common way to the summit of Coliseum is up the Coliseum Trail, a 6.5 km trail or a 13 km return hike up a non-motorized switchback trail, gaining 635 metres (2083 ft) of elevation. The Coliseum Trail Staging Area can be accessed by taking the Shunda Creek Road through the Nordegg North Subdivision and following the signed arrows along the road, to Baldy Mountain Road up to Eagle Drive.

The Ridgeline Trail is a longer, more challenging and less used trail to the summit. It is a 7.2 km trip to the peak or a 14.4 km return trip beginning at the Ranger Station, east of the town of Nordegg just off the David Thompson Highway. It climbs the ridge across from the Beaverdam Provincial Recreation Area.

There is also the Ranger Station Trail, beginning at the Ranger Station and following the base of the mountain, eventually connecting with the Coliseum Trail or the Ridgeline Trail. Some people choose to climb up the front face of the mountain, beginning at the Coliseum Staging Area. However, this trail is challenging and not clearly marked, with difficult scree sections, some scrambling and steep climbs.
