= Mount Ernest Ross =

Mountain in Alberta, Canada

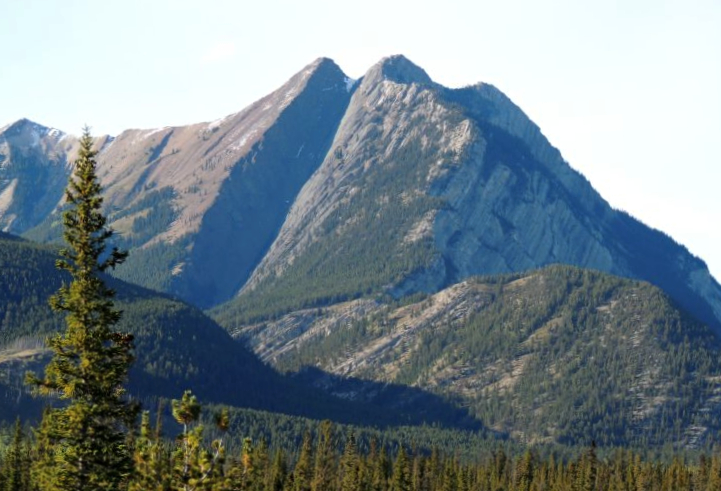
- Mount Ernest Ross

Highest point
- Elevation: 2,454 m (8,051 ft)
- Prominence: 99 m (325 ft)
- Parent peak: Mount Hensley (2820 m)
- Listing: Mountains of Alberta
- Coordinates: 52°06′10″N 116°27′10″W

Geography
- Location within Alberta Location within Canada
- Location: Alberta, Canada
- Parent range: Front Ranges; Canadian Rockies
- Topo map: NTS 83C1 Whiterabbit Creek

Geology
- Rock type: Sedimentary

Mount Ernest Ross is a 2,454-metre (8,051-foot) double summit mountain located in the North Saskatchewan River valley of the Canadian Rockies of Alberta, Canada. Mount Ernest Ross can be seen from the David Thompson Highway at the southern end of Abraham Lake. Precipitation runoff from the peak drains east into the lake. Mount William Booth is across the lake to the east, and Kootenay Plains and Ex Coelis Mountain are situated to the southeast. Its nearest higher peak is Elliott Peak, 3 km (1.9 mi) to the immediate north.

== History ==
This mountain is named after Ernest Ross, who in 1940 was the first to drive a motorized vehicle from Rocky Mountain House to Saskatchewan Crossing, many years before a road was built. He was instrumental in promoting the construction of what has become the David Thompson Highway, and when it was completed in 1969, was honored for his efforts. The mountain's name was officially adopted in 1980 when approved by the Geographical Names Board of Canada.

== Geology ==
Mount Ernest Ross is composed of sedimentary rock laid down from the Precambrian to Jurassic periods that was pushed east and over the top of younger rock during the Laramide orogeny.

== Climate ==
Based on the Köppen climate classification, Mount Ernest Ross is located in a subarctic climate with cold, snowy winters, and mild summers. Temperatures can drop below -20 °C with wind chill factors below -30 °C.

== Gallery ==
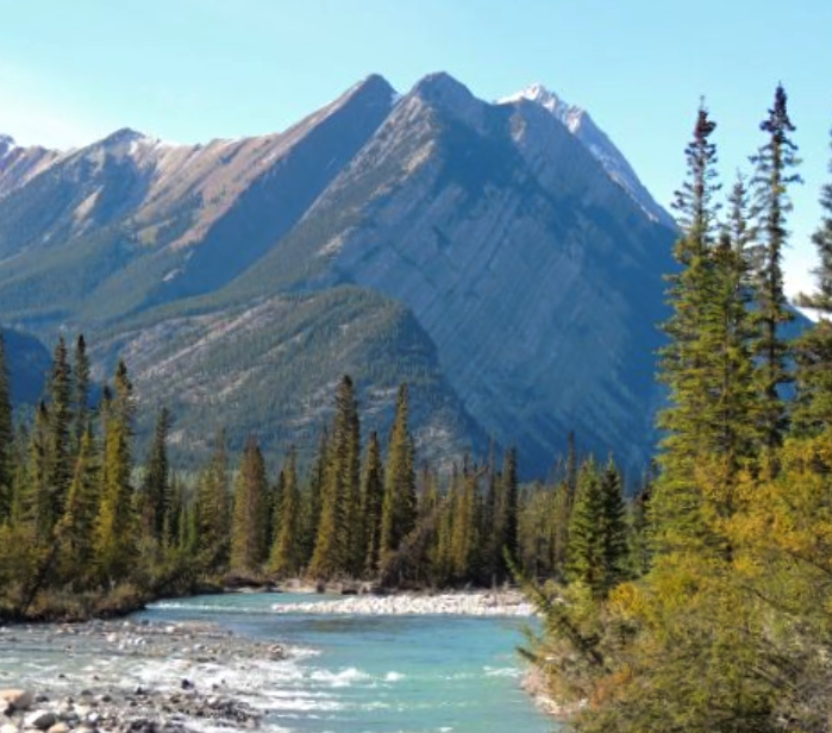
Mount Ernest Ross seen from the south

== See also ==
- List of mountains in the Canadian Rockies
- Geography of Alberta
