= Crescent Falls =

Two waterfalls on the Bighorn River in Alberta, Canada

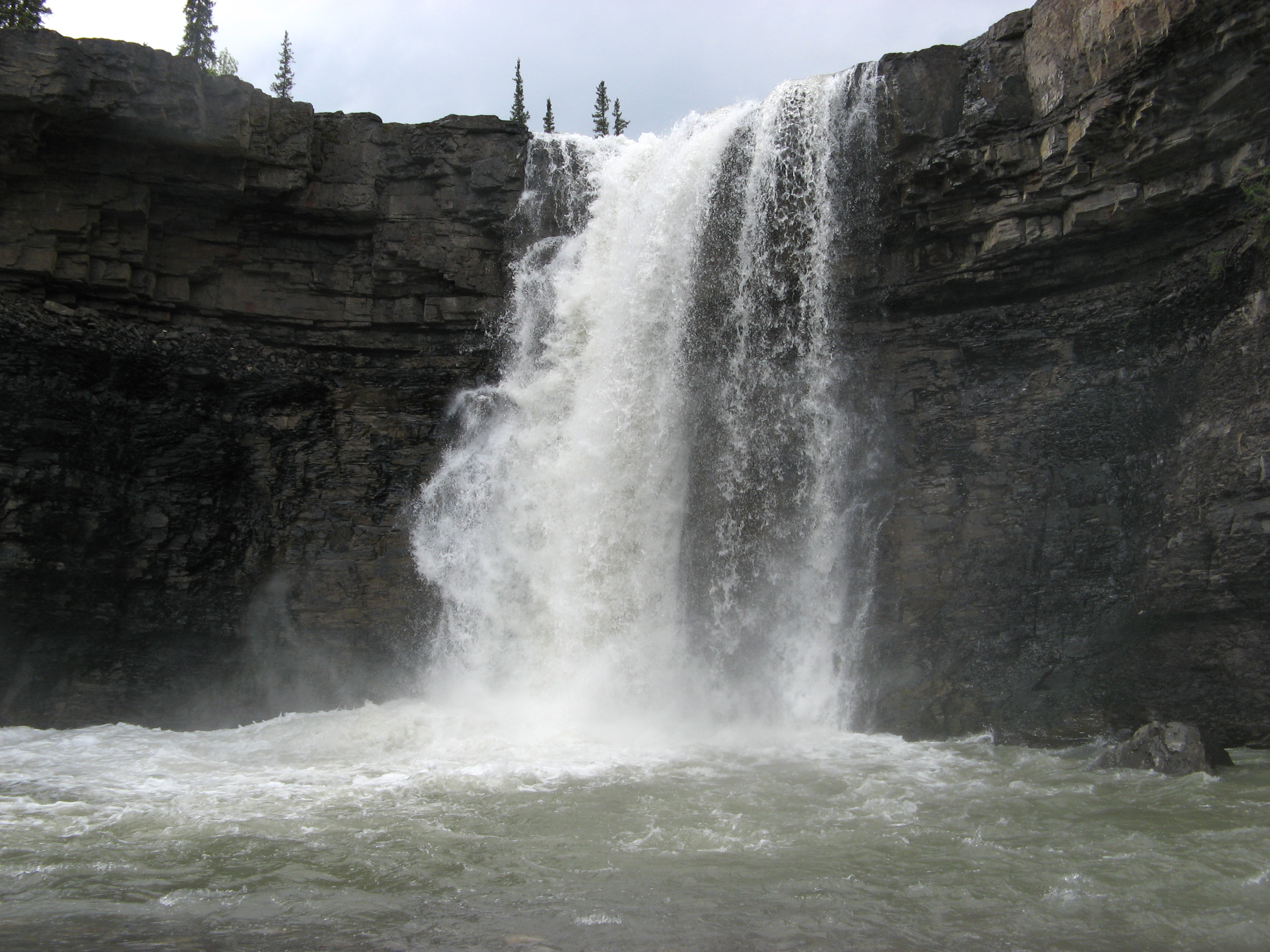
- Crescent Falls

- Location within Clearwater County
- Location: Clearwater County, Alberta
- Coordinates: 52°23′14″N 116°21′21″W
- Type: Tiered
- Total height: 27 m (89 ft)
- Number of drops: 2
- Watercourse: Bighorn River

Crescent Falls is a series of two waterfalls located on the Bighorn River in the Bighorn River Canyon in west-central Alberta, Canada. They were originally called the Bighorn Falls, after the river they are located on. The current name is a reference to the crescent cliff over which they drop.

The falls are located a few kilometres upstream of the river's confluence with the North Saskatchewan River. A 4.5-kilometre-long (2.8 mi) gravel road leads north from David Thompson Highway (between Abraham Lake and Nordegg) to the falls. The Crescent Falls Provincial Recreation Area is immediately up-river from the falls.

The waterfall is two-tiered and has a height of 27 metres (89 ft). Visitors are allowed at the waterfalls year-round. The rock ledges around the top of the falls are slippery and fatal drops have occurred. Additionally, people have died by being swept under the waterfall after swimming at the bottom of the falls.

Arthur Philemon Coleman, a professor of geology at the University of Toronto, made the first mention of the falls in 1892 and described them as having a "far better scenery than we had been used to in the foot-hills".

A sitting bench next to the falls is dedicated to James Hammond and placed there by his family after his death. Hammond was an avid outdoorsman and was especially fond of this location.

== Campground ==
Located to the north-west of Crescent Falls, is an un-serviced campground run by Westward Bound Campgrounds. It currently has 31 available sites to camp on, and is open from May 1 to October 14. The site has access to water; however, due to potential contamination from pathogens in ground water, the owners recommend that visitors bring their own drinking water.

The time it takes to travel to Crescent Falls and back is about 1 hour and 15 minutes. Access to the area below the first waterfall of Crescent Falls has been restricted, mostly due to unsafe travel conditions and thin ice.

== See also ==
- List of waterfalls
- List of waterfalls of Canada
