= Allstones Peak =

Mountain peak in Alberta, Canada

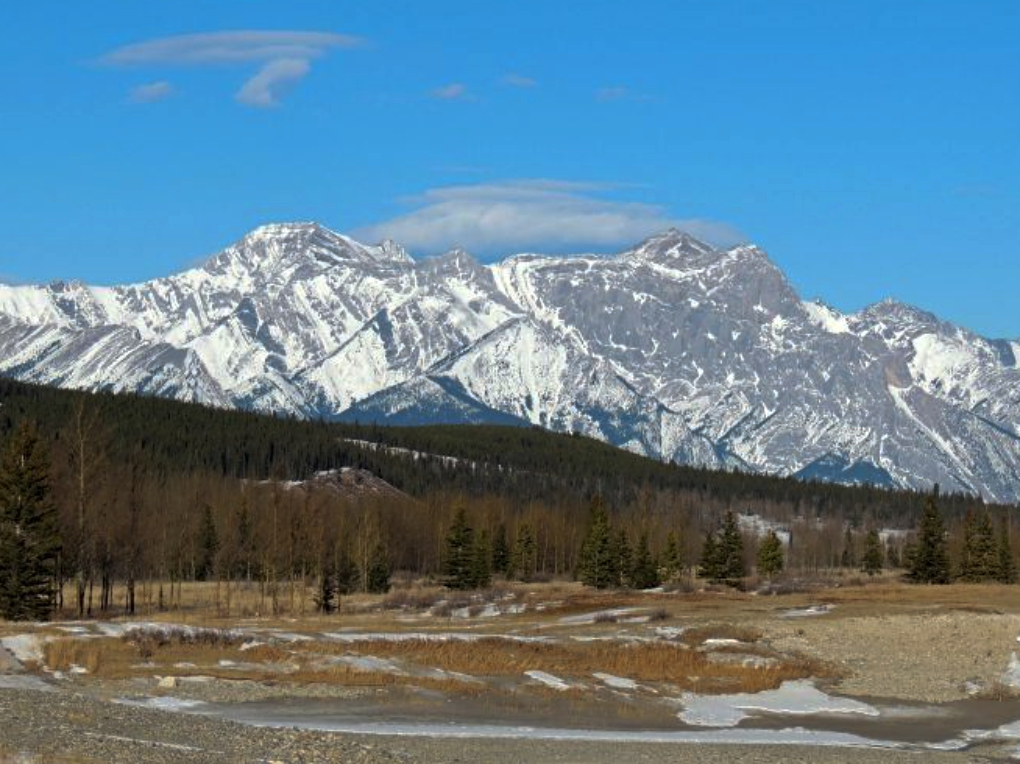
- Allstones Peak (left) seen from the south with Abraham Mountain (right)

Highest point
- Elevation: 2,940 m (9,650 ft)
- Prominence: 480 m (1,570 ft)
- Parent peak: Fence Post Peak (3060 m)
- Listing: Mountains of Alberta
- Coordinates: 52°16′42″N 116°29′45″W

Geography
- Location within Alberta Location within Canada
- Country: Canada
- Province: Alberta
- Parent range: First Range; Front Ranges; Canadian Rockies
- Topo map: NTS 83C8 Nordegg

Geology
- Rock type: Sedimentary

Climbing
- Easiest route: Scramble

Allstones Peak is a 2,940-metre (9,650-foot) mountain summit located in the North Saskatchewan River valley of the Canadian Rockies of Alberta, Canada. Its nearest higher peak is Fence Post Peak, 16.0 km (9.9 mi) to the west. Allstones Peak can be seen from David Thompson Highway and Abraham Lake. Precipitation runoff from Allstones Peak drains east into Abraham Lake, and northwest to Littlehorn Creek. Allstones Peak is composed of sedimentary rock laid down from the Precambrian to Jurassic periods that was pushed east and over the top of younger rock during the Laramide orogeny.

== Climate ==
Based on the Köppen climate classification, Allstones Peak is located in a subarctic climate with cold, snowy winters, and mild summers. Temperatures can drop below −20 °C with wind chill factors below −30 °C.

== See also ==
- List of mountains of Canada
- Geography of Alberta
