= Sentinel Mountain (Alberta) =

Mountain in Alberta, Canada

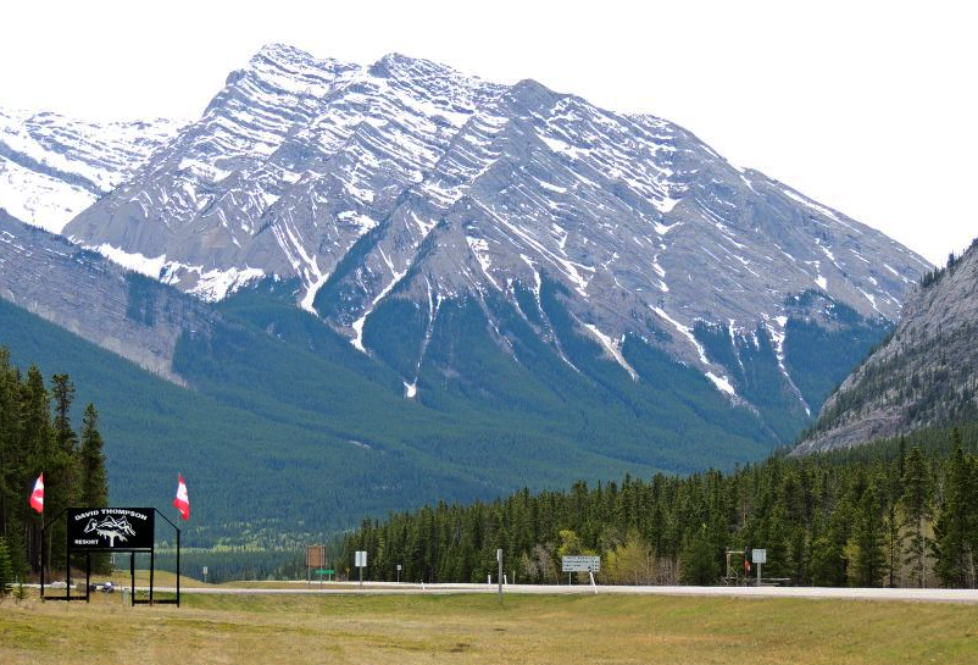
- Sentinel Mountain from the David Thompson Highway

Highest point
- Elevation: 2,591 m (8,501 ft)
- Prominence: 107 m (351 ft)
- Parent peak: Elliott Peak (2873 m)
- Listing: Mountains of Alberta
- Coordinates: 52°08′14″N 116°29′32″W

Geography
- Location within Alberta Location within Canada
- Location: Alberta, Canada
- Parent range: Canadian Rockies
- Topo map: NTS 83C1 Whiterabbit Creek

Geology
- Rock type: Sedimentary

Climbing
- First ascent: 1858 by James Hector

Sentinel Mountain is a 2,591-metre (8,501-foot) mountain located in the North Saskatchewan River valley of the Canadian Rockies of Alberta, Canada. Its nearest higher peak is Elliott Peak, 1.6 km (0.99 mi) to the southeast. Both can be seen from the David Thompson Highway and Abraham Lake. Precipitation runoff from Sentinel Mountain drains into tributaries of the North Saskatchewan River. The mountain was named in 1893 by Arthur P. Coleman and the toponym was officially adopted in 1928 by the Geographical Names Board of Canada.

== Geology ==
Sentinel Mountain is composed of sedimentary rock laid down from the Precambrian to Jurassic periods. Formed in shallow seas, this sedimentary rock was pushed east and over the top of younger rock during the Laramide orogeny.

== Climate ==
Based on the Köppen climate classification, Sentinel Mountain is located in a subarctic climate zone with cold, snowy winters, and mild summers. Winter temperatures can drop below -20 °C with wind chill factors below -30 °C.

== Gallery ==
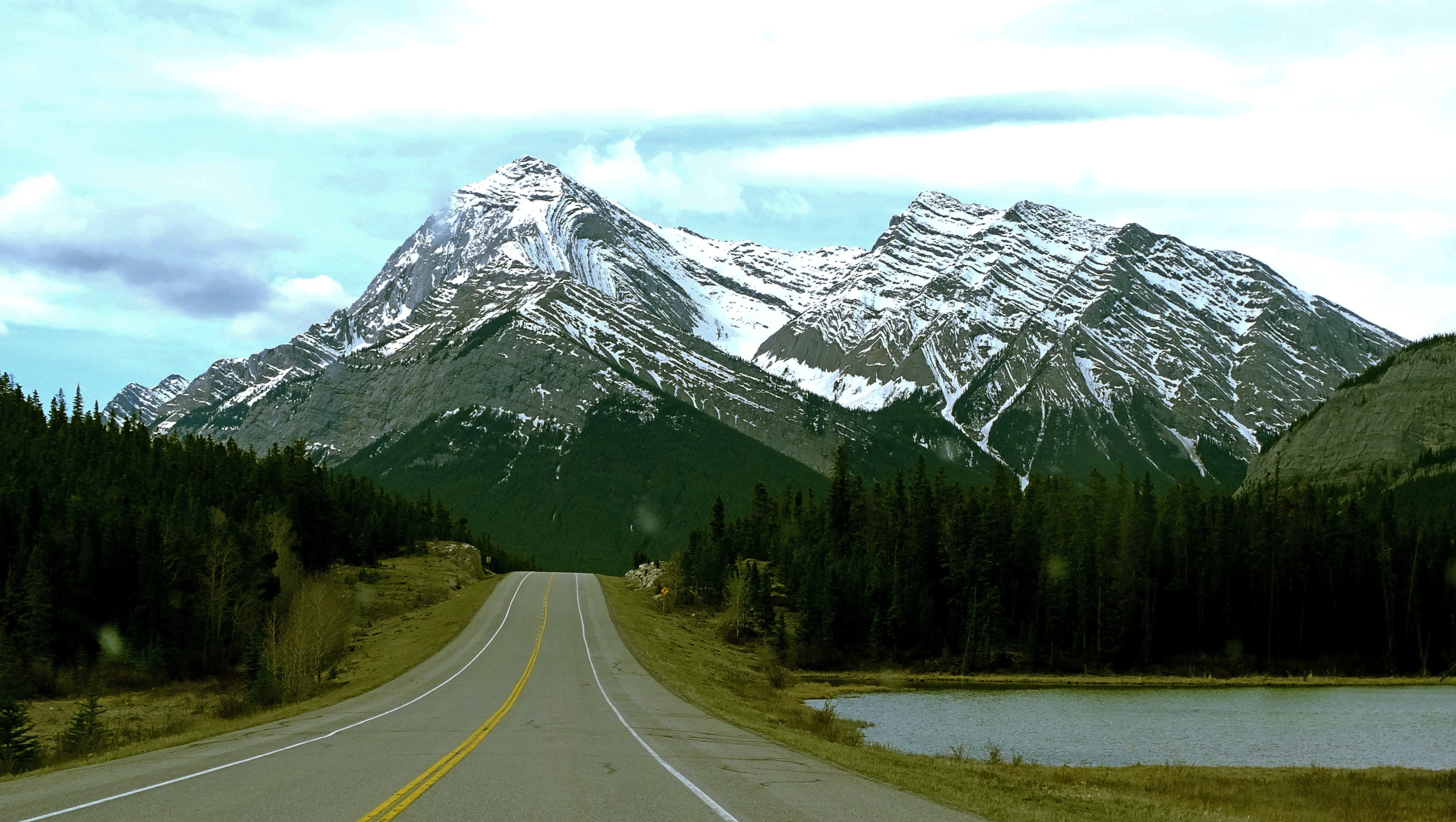
Elliott Peak (left) with Sentinel Mountain

== See also ==
- List of mountains of Canada
- Geography of Alberta
