= Mount Michener =

Mountain in Alberta, Canada

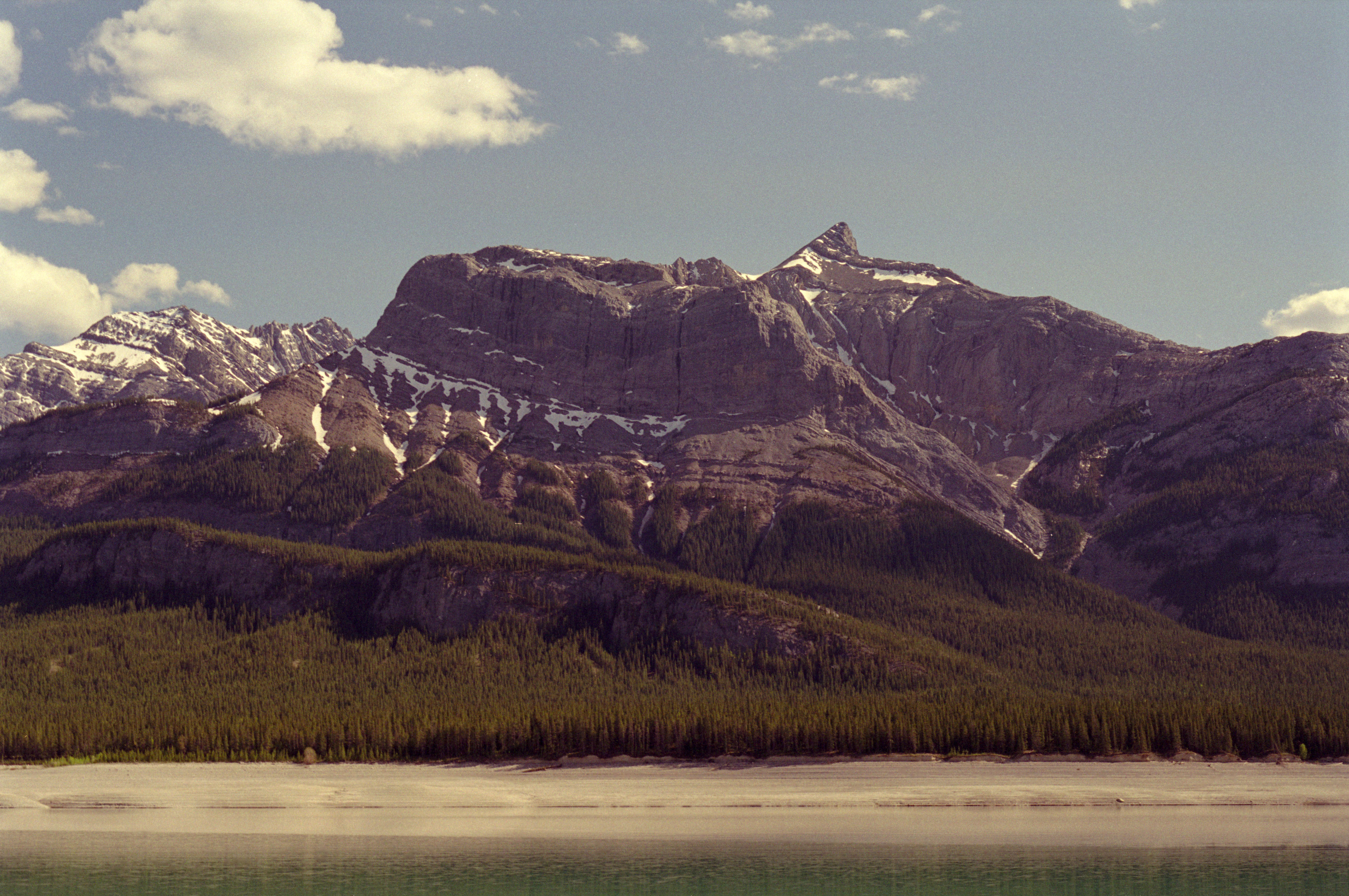
- North face from Abraham Lake

Highest point
- Elevation: 2,545 m (8,350 ft)
- Prominence: 564 m (1,850 ft)
- Parent peak: Kista Peak (2576 m)
- Listing: Mountains of Alberta
- Coordinates: 52°12′24″N 116°23′26″W

Geography
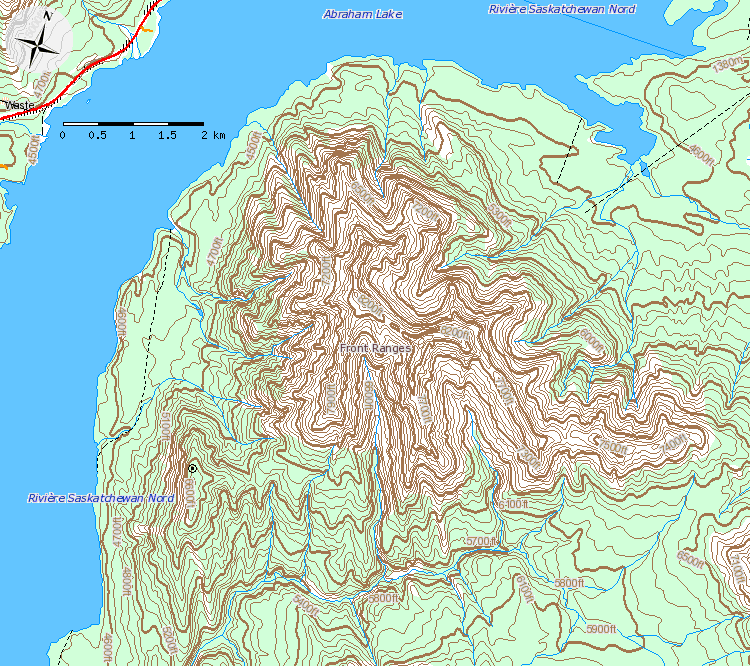
- NTS Topographic Map showing Mount Michener
- Country: Canada
- Province: Alberta
- Parent range: Ram Range
- Topo map: NTS 83C1 Whiterabbit Creek

Mount Michener is a 2,545-metre (8,350 ft) mountain on the eastern border of the Canadian Rockies in Alberta, Canada. It forms the northerly part of the Ram Range.

The mountain sits on the shore of Abraham Lake and its north, west and south face are all visible from the David Thompson Highway.

The mountain was named in 1982 after Daniel Roland Michener who was the Governor General of Canada from 1967 - 1974. Its previous names were Eye Opener Mountain and Phoebe's Teat, reportedly after a woman from Rocky Mountain House who would periodically visit the Nordegg miners in the 1930s.

== Geography ==
The formation of the Rocky Mountains began in the Late Cretaceous Period and finished in the early Paleogene Period. The pressure on the fault line caused thousands of metres of rock to thrust upward. The contorted beds near the summit of Mount Michener are visible evidence of the tremendous force that caused its formation. A system of limestone caves does exist within the mountain, but they remain undocumented.

== See also ==
- Media related to Mount Michener at Wikimedia Commons
