= Elliott Peak =

Mountain in Alberta, Canada

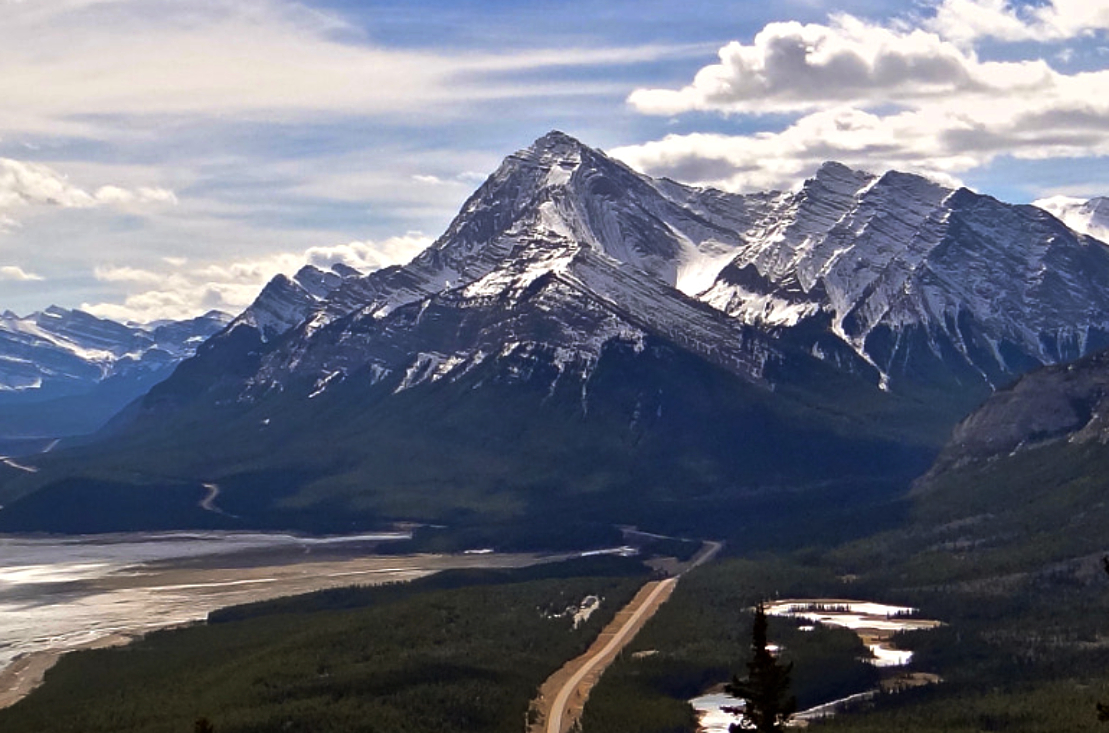
- Elliott Peak and the David Thompson Highway seen from Abraham Mountain

Highest point
- Elevation: 2,873 m (9,426 ft)
- Prominence: 453 m (1,486 ft)
- Parent peak: Mount Cline (3361 m)
- Listing: Mountains of Alberta
- Coordinates: 52°07′41″N 116°28′30″W

Geography
- Location within Alberta Location within Canada
- Interactive map of Elliott Peak
- Location: Alberta, Canada
- Parent range: Canadian Rockies
- Topo map: NTS 83C1 Whiterabbit Creek

Geology
- Rock type: Sedimentary

Climbing
- First ascent: 1906 Elliott Barnes Jr.

Elliott Peak is a 2,873-metre (9,426 ft) mountain summit located in the North Saskatchewan River valley of the Canadian Rockies of Alberta, Canada. Its nearest higher peak is Mount Cline, 16.0 km (9.9 mi) to the southwest. Elliott Peak can be seen from David Thompson Highway and Abraham Lake. Precipitation runoff from Elliott Peak drains into tributaries of the Saskatchewan River. Mount Ernest Ross is located immediately south of the mountain.

== History ==
The original name of the mountain was Sentinel Peak when applied by Arthur Coleman in 1892. The shoulder of Elliott Peak, 1.6 km to the northwest, is now named Sentinel Mountain. It was renamed in 1907 for Elliott Barnes Jr. whose father Elliot Barnes Sr. owned a ranch in the North Saskatchewan valley near the foot of the mountain. Elliott Jr. made the first ascent of the peak in 1906 when he was only eight years old.

The mountain's name was made official in 1924 by the Geographical Names Board of Canada.

== Geology ==
Elliott Peak is composed of sedimentary rock laid down from the Precambrian to Jurassic periods. Formed in shallow seas, this sedimentary rock was pushed east and over the top of younger rock during the Laramide orogeny.

== Climate ==
Based on the Köppen climate classification, Elliott Peak is located in a subarctic climate with cold, snowy winters, and mild summers. Temperatures can drop below -20 C with wind chill factors below -30 C.

== Gallery ==
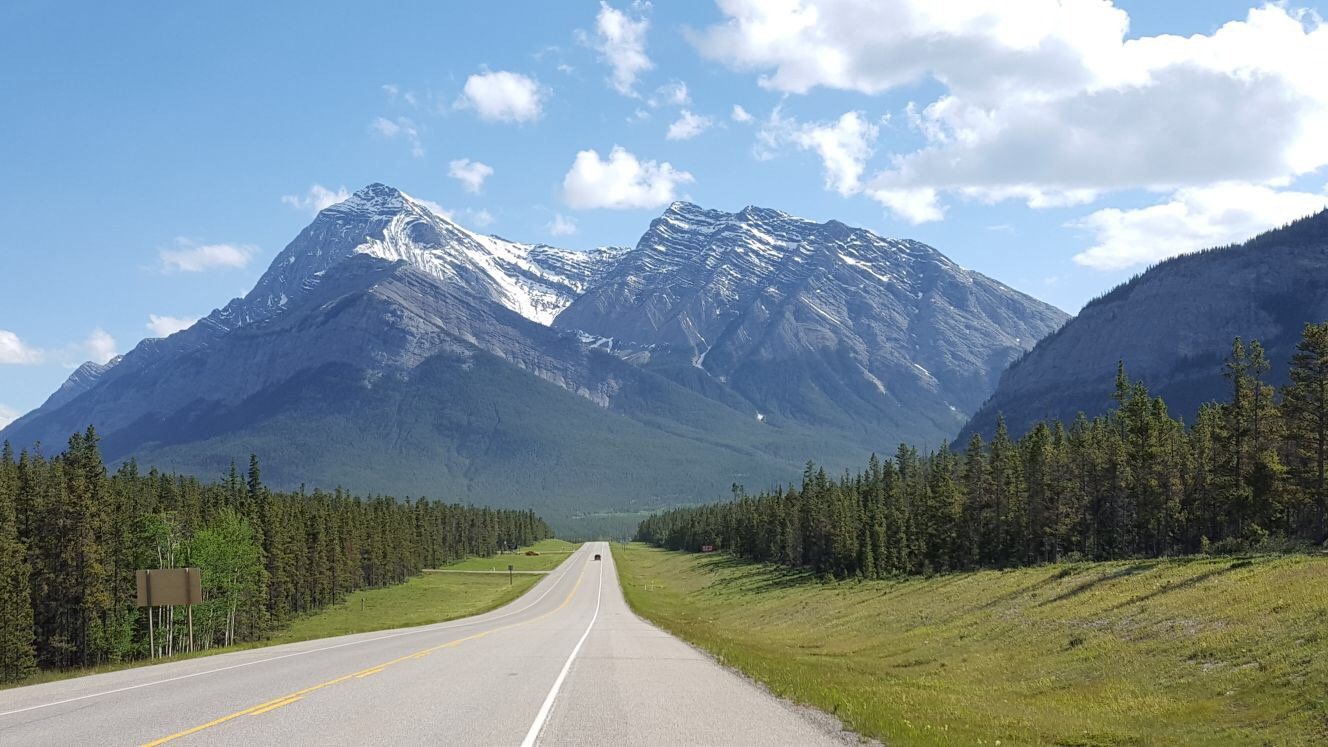
Elliott Peak and David Thompson Highway

== See also ==
- Geology of the Rocky Mountains
