= Bighorn River (disambiguation) =

Bighorn River may refer to:

- Bighorn River, a river in Wyoming and Montana, USA
- Little Bighorn River, tributary of the Bighorn River in the United States in the states of Wyoming and Montana
- Bighorn River (Alberta), a river in Alberta, Canada
