= Little Big (disambiguation) =

Little Big are Russian electro-rave band.

Little Big may also refer to:

- Little, Big, a 1981 fantasy novel by John Crowley
- LITTLE, big, a 2002 album by Terry Scott Taylor

== See also ==
- ARM big.LITTLE, a computer processor core
- Little Big Adventure, a video game
- Little Big Painting, a painting by Roy Lichtenstein
- Little Big Star, a television singing contest
- Little Big Town, a country music band
- Little Bighorn (disambiguation)
- LittleBigPlanet, a video game for the PlayStation 3 console
