= Kista Peak =

Mountain in Alberta, Canada

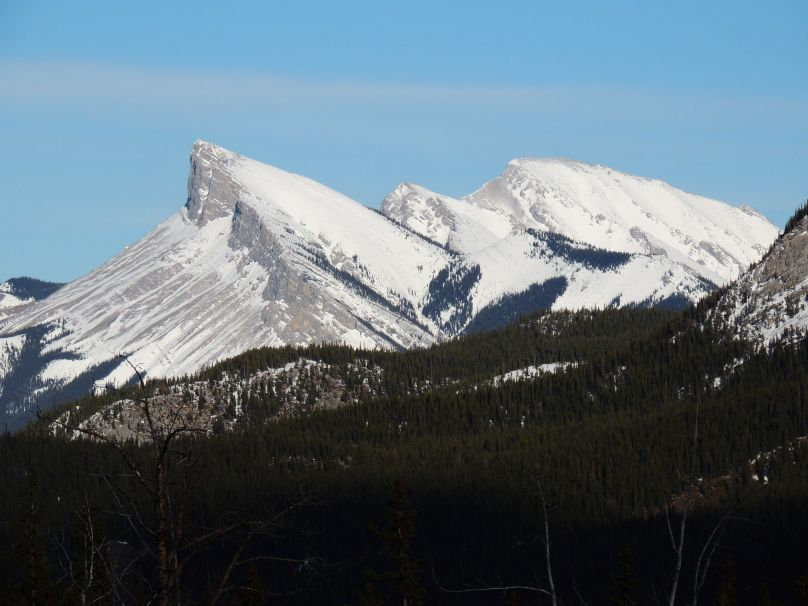
- Kista Peak

Highest point
- Elevation: 2,576 m (8,451 ft)
- Prominence: 732 m (2,402 ft)
- Parent peak: Mount Mumford (2694 m)
- Listing: Mountains of Alberta
- Coordinates: 52°13′49″N 116°13′59″W

Geography
- Location within Alberta Location within Canada
- Location: Alberta, Canada
- Parent range: Ram Range; Canadian Rockies
- Topo map: NTS 83C1 Whiterabbit Creek

Geology
- Rock type: Sedimentary

Kista Peak is a 2,576-metre (8,451-foot) mountain summit located in the North Saskatchewan River valley of Alberta, Canada. Kista Peak is part of the Ram Range, a sub-range of the Canadian Rockies. Its nearest higher peak is Mount Mumford, 12.4 km (7.7 mi) to the south. Mount Michener lies 11.0 km (6.8 mi) to the west, and both Kista and Michener can be seen from the David Thompson Highway. Precipitation runoff from Kista Peak drains west into Abraham Lake, or east into Kiska Creek.

== Geology ==
Kista Peak is composed of sedimentary rock laid down from the Precambrian to Jurassic periods that was pushed east and over the top of younger rock during the Laramide orogeny.

== Climate ==
Based on the Köppen climate classification, Kista Peak is located in a subarctic climate with cold, snowy winters, and mild summers. Temperatures can drop below -20 °C with wind chill factors below -30 °C.

== Gallery ==
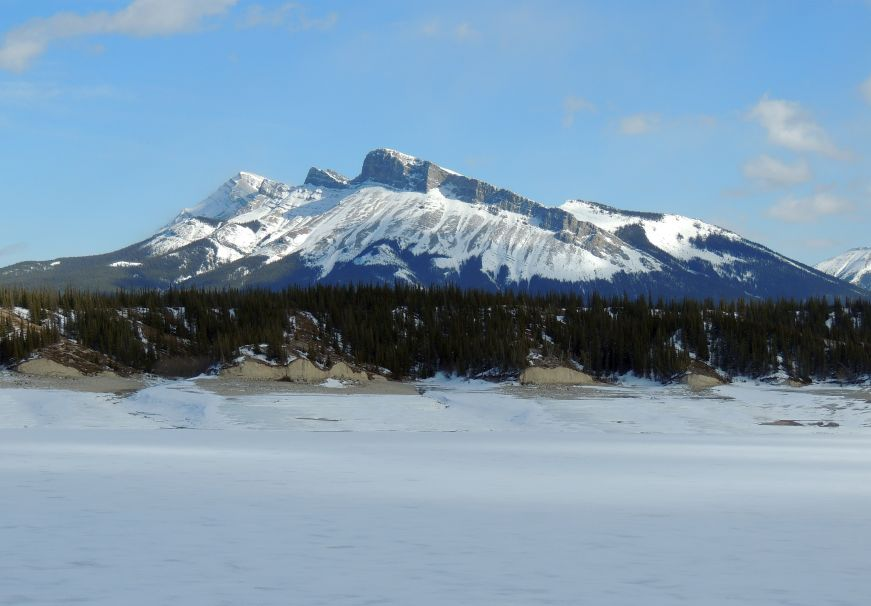
Kista Peak from Abraham Lake

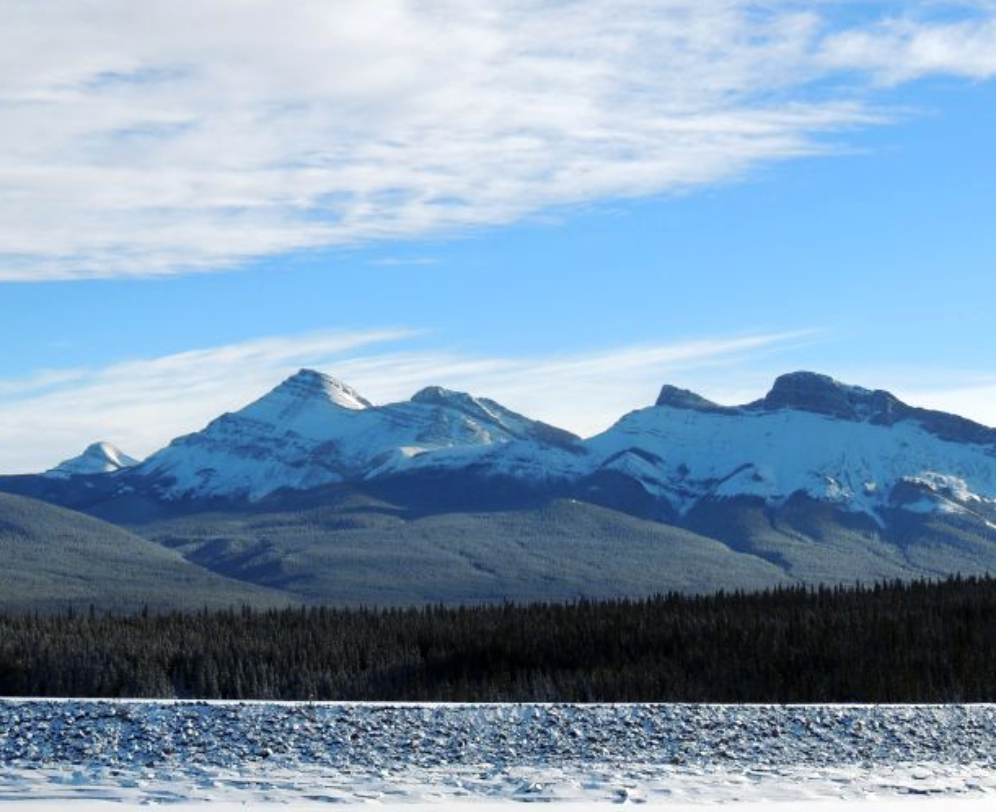
Kista Peak and frozen Abraham Lake

== See also ==
- List of mountains of Canada
- Alberta's Rockies
