= Ram Range =

Subrange of the Front Ranges in Alberta, Canada

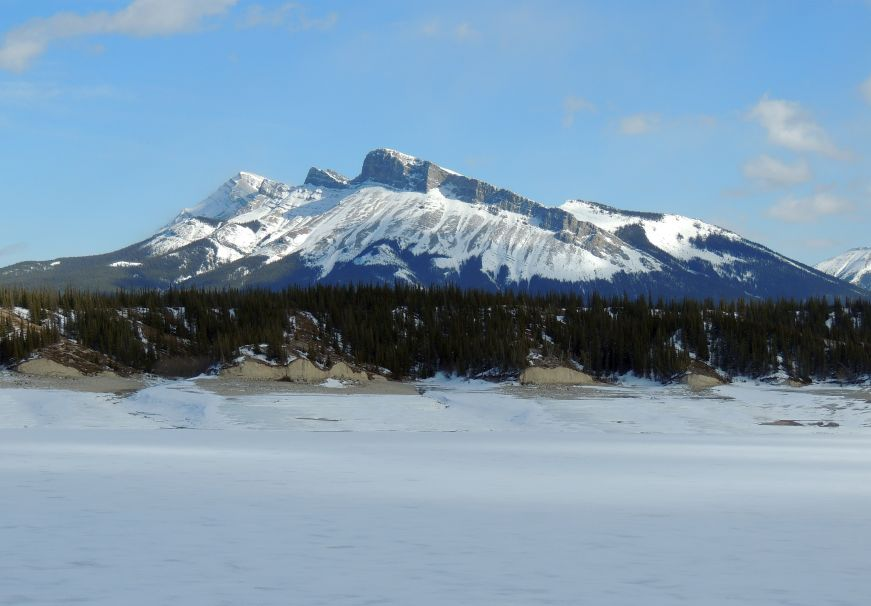
- Kista Peak from Abraham Lake

Highest point
- Peak: Canary Peak
- Elevation: 2,844 m (9,331 ft)
- Prominence: 726 m (2,382 ft)
- Listing: Mountains of Alberta
- Coordinates: 52°01′26″N 116°09′32″W

Dimensions
- Length: 35 km (22 mi) EW
- Width: 31 km (19 mi) NS
- Area: 558 km^{2} (215 mi^{2})

Geography
- Location within Alberta
- Country: Canada
- Province: Alberta
- Range coordinates: 52°03′N 116°10′W
- Parent range: Canadian Rockies
- Topo map: NTS 83C1 Whiterabbit Creek

The Ram Range is a mountain range of the Canadian Rockies located in David Thompson Country, Canada. The range extends southeast from Abraham Lake to the Ram River. It is bounded on the southwest by Whiterabbit Creek.

== List of mountains ==
This range includes the following mountains and peaks:

Mountain/Peak	Elevation		Coordinates
Mountain/Peak	m	ft	Coordinates
Canary Peak	2,844	9,331	
Mount Bramwell	2,758	9,049	
Wingnut Peak	2,758	9,049	
Mount William Booth	2,728	8,950	52°5′24″N 116°19′18″W
Finch Peak	2,606	8,550	
Hummingbird Peak	2,594	8,510	
Kista Peak	2,576	8,451	52°13′49″N 116°13′59″W
Mount Michener	2,545	8,350	52°12′24″N 116°23′26″W
