= Abraham Mountain =

Mountain in Alberta, Canada

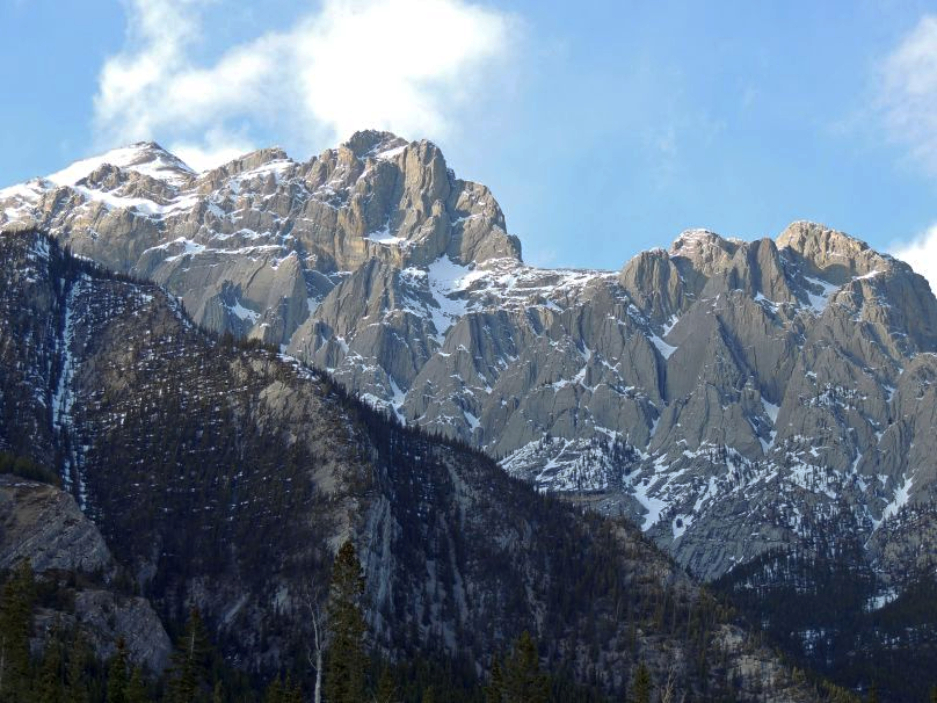
- Abraham Mountain

Highest point
- Elevation: 2,820 m (9,250 ft)
- Prominence: 160 m (520 ft)
- Parent peak: Allstones Peak (2940 m)
- Listing: Mountains of Alberta
- Coordinates: 52°16′04″N 116°27′53″W

Geography
- Location within Alberta Location within Canada
- Country: Canada
- Province: Alberta
- Parent range: Front Ranges; Canadian Rockies
- Topo map: NTS 83C8 Nordegg

Geology
- Rock type: Sedimentary

Abraham Mountain is a 2,820-metre (9,250-foot) mountain summit located in the North Saskatchewan River valley of the Canadian Rockies of Alberta, Canada. Its nearest higher peak is Allstones Peak, 2.0 km (1.2 mi) to the west. Abraham Mountain can be seen from David Thompson Highway and Abraham Lake. Precipitation runoff from Abraham Mountain drains east into Abraham Lake.

== History ==
Like the lake, the mountain was named for Silas Abraham (1871–1961), a Stoney Indian inhabitant of the Kootenay Plains and Saskatchewan River valley, who was employed by Mary Schäffer as her guide during her 1906 and 1907 explorations. He also guided Martin Nordegg.

== Geology ==
Abraham Mountain is composed of sedimentary rock laid down from the Precambrian to Jurassic periods that was pushed east and over the top of younger rock during the Laramide orogeny.

== Climate ==
Based on the Köppen climate classification, Abraham Mountain is located in a subarctic climate zone with cold, snowy winters, and mild summers. Temperatures can drop below −20 °C with wind chill factors below −30 °C.

== Gallery ==
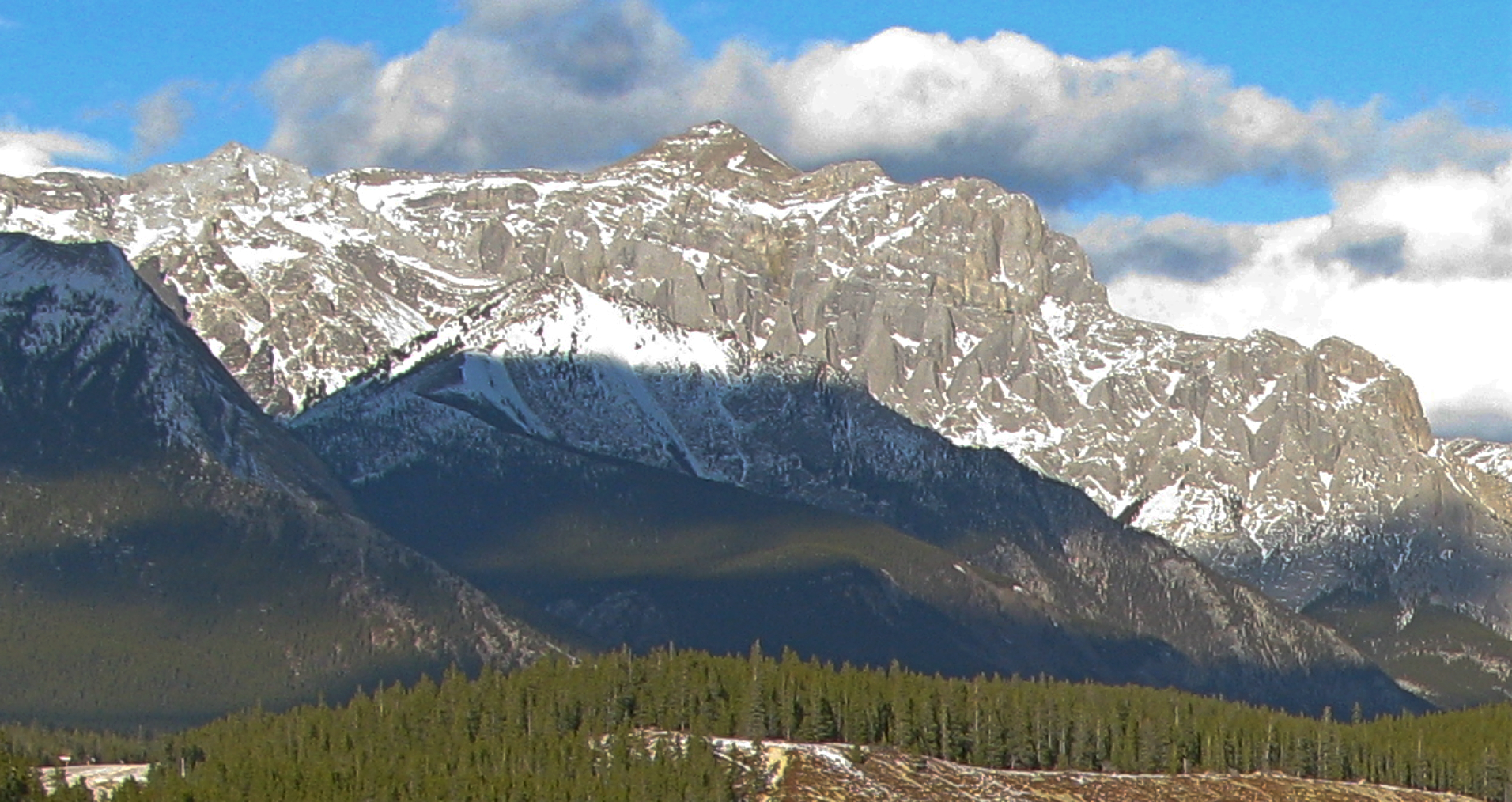
Abraham Mountain seen from mouth of Cline River

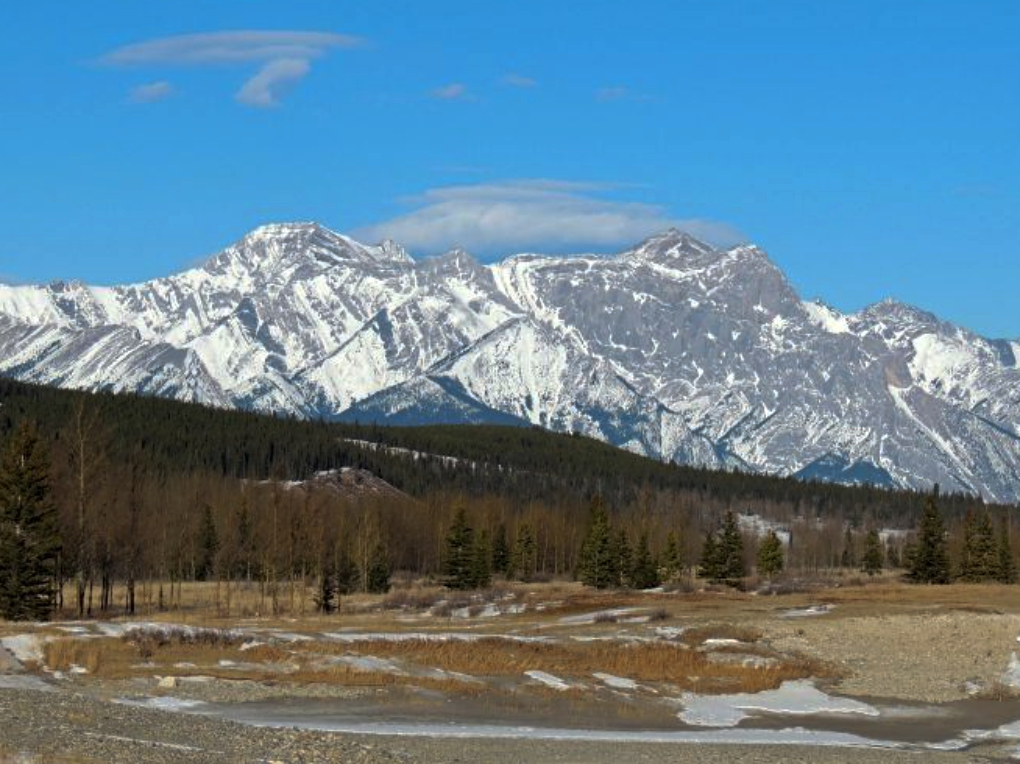
Allstones Peak (left) and Abraham Mountain (right)

== See also ==
- Geology of the Rocky Mountains
- Geography of Alberta
