= Mount William Booth =

Mountain in Alberta, Canada

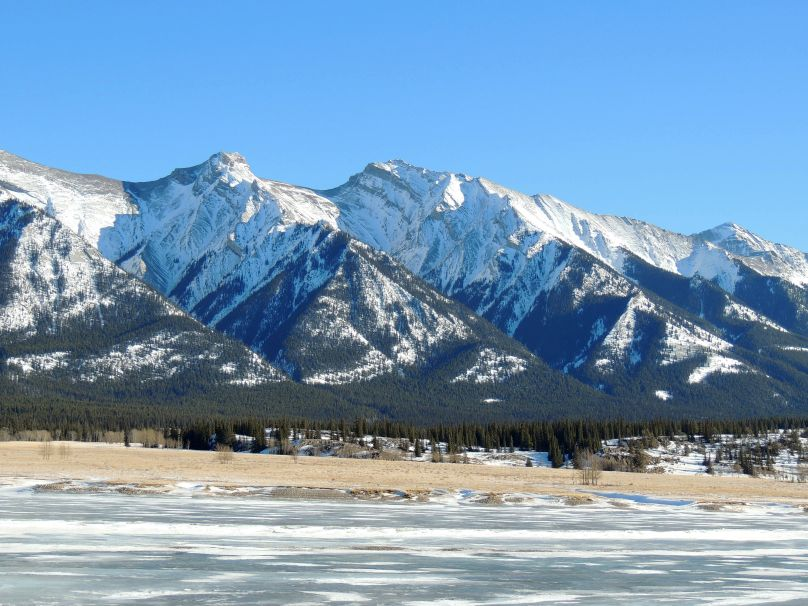

Highest point
- Elevation: 2,728 m (8,950 ft)
- Prominence: 795 m (2,608 ft)
- Listing: Mountains of Alberta
- Coordinates: 52°05′22″N 116°19′14″W

Geography
- Location within Alberta Location within Canada
- Country: Canada
- Province: Alberta
- Parent range: Ram Range
- Topo map: NTS 83C1 Whiterabbit Creek

Mount William Booth was named in 1965 after William Booth, the founder of the Salvation Army. It is part of the Ram Range in Alberta, Canada, and situated near the southern end of Abraham Lake. It is located in the North Saskatchewan River valley of the Canadian Rockies, and can be seen from the David Thompson Highway east of Saskatchewan Crossing.

== Climate ==
Based on the Köppen climate classification, Mount William Booth is located in a subarctic climate with cold, snowy winters, and mild summers. Temperatures can drop below -20 °C with wind chill factors below -30 °C.

== Gallery ==
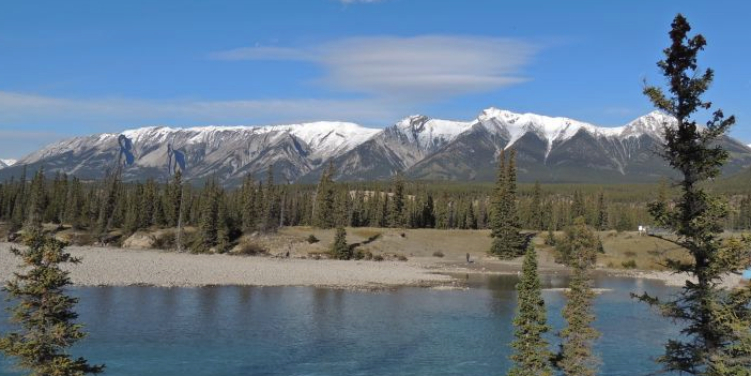
Mount William Booth

== See also ==
- List of mountains of Canada
- Geography of Alberta
