= Ex Coelis Mountain =

Mountain in Alberta, Canada

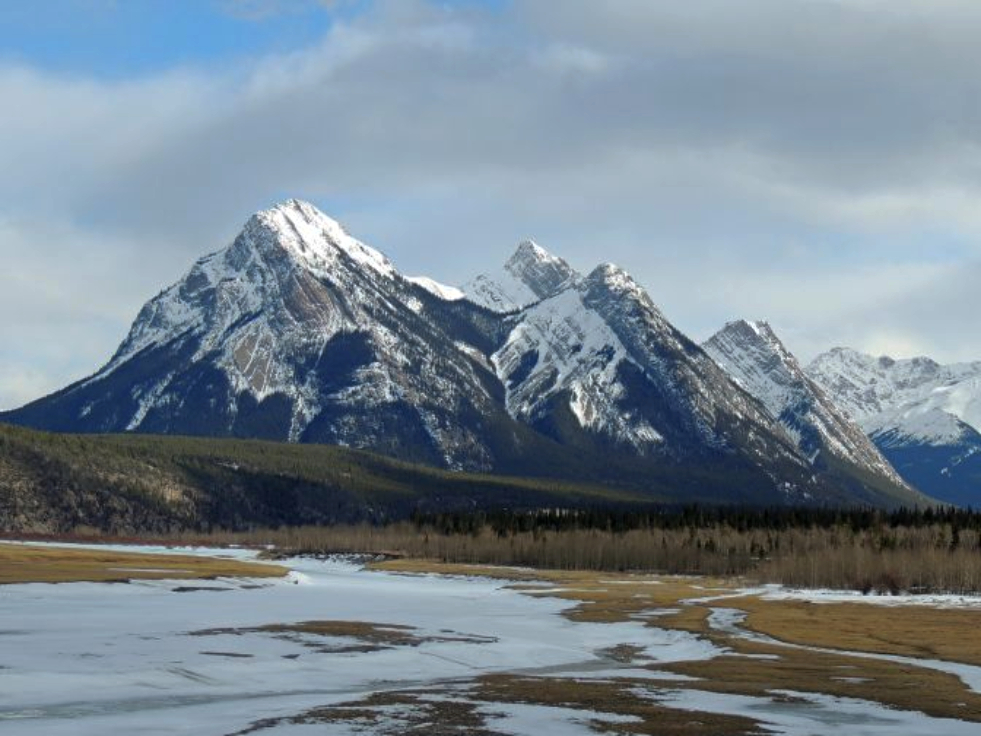
- Ex Coelis Mountain

Highest point
- Elevation: 2,545 m (8,350 ft)
- Prominence: 381 m (1,250 ft)
- Parent peak: Hatter Peak (2930 m)
- Listing: Mountains of Alberta
- Coordinates: 52°01′54″N 116°20′26″W

Geography
- Location within Alberta Location within Canada
- Interactive map of Ex Coelis Mountain
- Location: Alberta, Canada
- Parent range: Canadian Rockies
- Topo map: NTS 83C1 Whiterabbit Creek

Geology
- Rock type: Sedimentary

Ex Coelis Mountain is a 2,545-metre (8,350-foot) mountain with five peaks located in the North Saskatchewan River valley of the Canadian Rockies of Alberta, Canada. It is situated south of Abraham Lake and just outside the eastern boundary of Banff National Park. Its nearest higher peak is Hatter Peak, 8.0 km (5.0 mi) to the southeast. Ex Coelis Mountain can be seen from the David Thompson Highway east of Saskatchewan Crossing. Ex Coelis Mountain is composed of sedimentary rock laid down from the Precambrian to Jurassic periods that was pushed east and over the top of younger rock during the Laramide orogeny.

== History ==
In 1911, this geographic feature was originally known as Kadoona Mountain by Mary Schäffer, which is a corruption of the Stoney name Kedonnaha Tinda (Meadow of the Winds), today known as the Kootenay Plains.

The mountain's name was officially adopted in 1994 by the Geographical Names Board of Canada to honour the 1st Canadian Parachute Battalion. In Latin, Ex Coelis means Out of the Clouds, which is their motto.

In 1997, the five peaks of Ex Coelis Mountain were assigned individual names. Normandy Peak, Ardennes Peak, and Rhine Peak were named for World War II battles in which the battalion participated. Elbe Peak was named for the river near where the battalion met the Russian Army. Stan Waters Peak is named for Stanley Waters, a battalion member.

== Summits of Ex Coelis Mountain ==
| Name | Elevation | Prominence | Reference |
|---|---|---|---|
| Rhine Peak | 2545 m | 381 m | |
| Stan Waters Peak | 2515 m | 183 m | |
| Normandy Peak | 2454 m | 214 m | |
| Ardennes Peak | 2271 m | 183 m | |
| Elbe Peak | 2260 m | 142 m | |

== Climate ==
Based on the Köppen climate classification, Ex Coelis Mountain is located in a subarctic climate with cold, snowy winters, and mild summers. Winter temperatures can drop below −20 °C with wind chill factors below −30 °C.

== Gallery ==
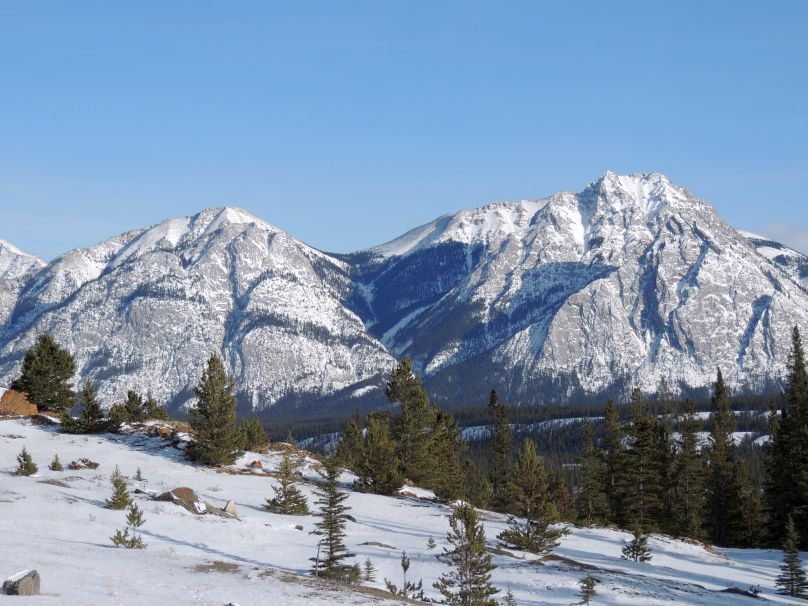
Ex Coelis Mountain

== See also ==
- List of mountains of Canada
- Geography of Alberta
- Geology of the Rocky Mountains
