= Big Horn Peak =

Mountain in Montana, United States

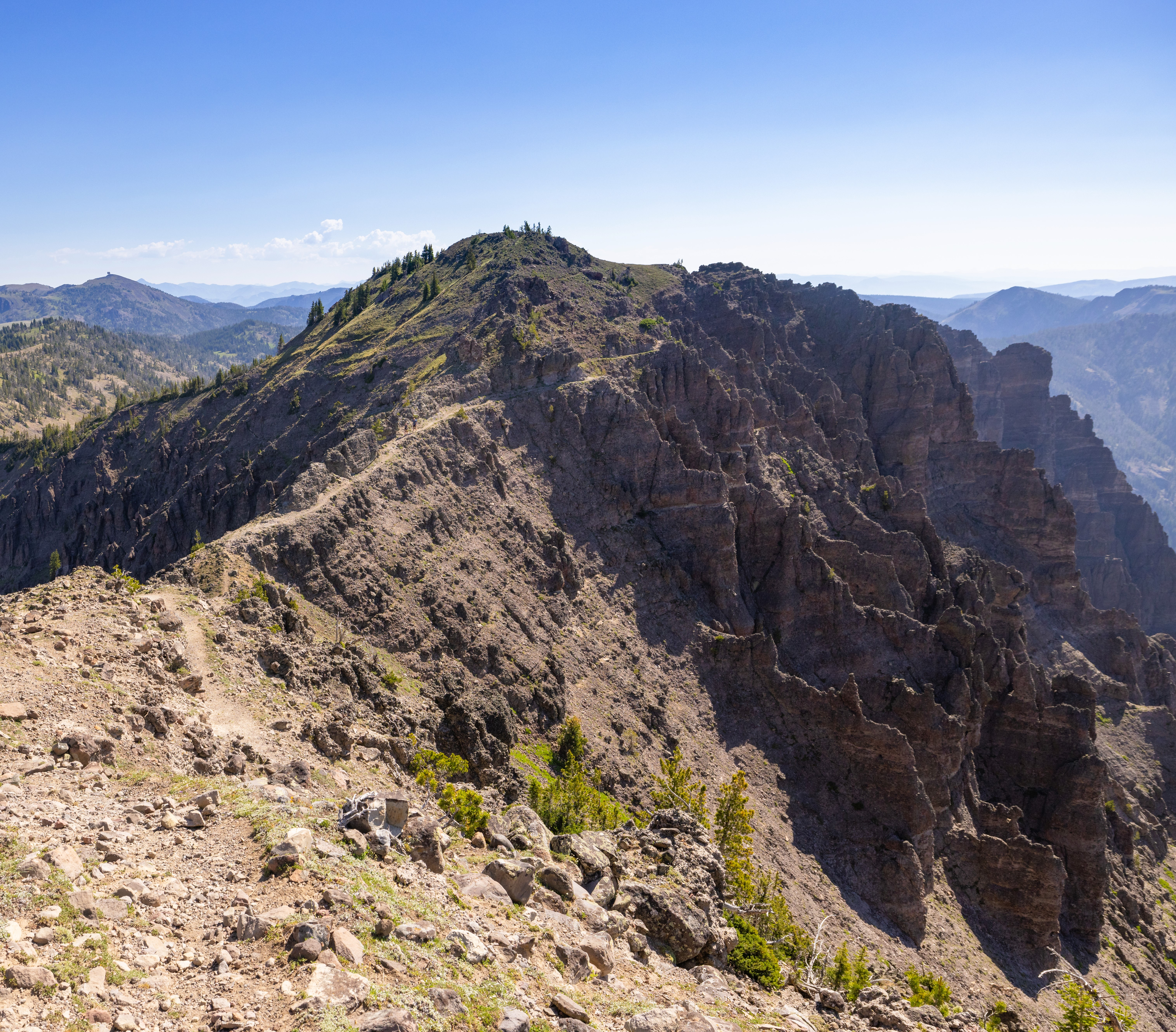
- West aspect of the true summit

Highest point
- Elevation: 9,935 ft (3,028 m)
- Prominence: 686 ft (209 m)
- Parent peak: Sheep Mountain (10,100 ft)
- Isolation: 3.21 mi (5.17 km)
- Coordinates: 45°03′58″N 111°03′23″W

Geography
- Location within Montana Location within the United States
- Country: United States
- State: Montana
- County: Gallatin
- Protected area: Yellowstone National Park
- Parent range: Gallatin Range; Rocky Mountains
- Topo map: USGS Big Horn Peak

Geology
- Rock type: Conglomerate

Climbing
- Easiest route: class 1 Sky Rim Trail

Big Horn Peak is a 9,935-foot (3,028-metre) mountain summit in Gallatin County, Montana, United States.

== Description ==
Big Horn Peak is located 40 miles (64 km) south of Bozeman in the Gallatin Range, which is a subrange of the Rocky Mountains. It is set on the common boundary shared by Yellowstone National Park and the Gallatin National Forest. Precipitation runoff from the mountain's north slope drains to the Yellowstone River via Tom Miner Creek, whereas the other slopes drain into tributaries of the nearby Gallatin River. Topographic relief is significant as the summit rises over 2,300 feet (701 meters) above North Fork Specimen Creek in 1.5 miles (2.4 km) and 1,300 feet (396 meters) above the headwaters of Tom Miner Creek in 0.5 miles (0.80 km). The approach to the remote summit is made from the scenic Sky Rim Trail with a 0.3-mile spur trail to the true summit. The mountain's toponym was officially adopted on May 7, 1930, by the United States Board on Geographic Names.

== Climate ==
Based on the Köppen climate classification, Big Horn Peak is located in a subarctic climate zone characterized by long, usually very cold winters, and mild summers. Winter temperatures can drop below 0 °F with wind chill factors below −10 °F.

== See also ==
- Geology of the Rocky Mountains
