= Bighorn Mountains (California) =

Mountain range in California, United States

- Location within California

Highest point
- Peak: Granite Peak
- Elevation: 1,744 m (5,722 ft)

Geography
- Country: United States
- State: California
- Region: Mojave Desert
- District: San Bernardino County
- Range coordinates: 34°18′27.015″N 116°37′30.080″W
- Topo map: USGS Bighorn Canyon

The Bighorn Mountains are a mountain range of the Mojave Desert and Transverse Ranges, located in San Bernardino County, California. They are primarily within a Bureau of Land Management (BLM) protected area.

== Geography ==
They are an eastern subrange of the San Bernardino Mountains. The Bighorn Mountains are located north of the Morongo Valley, northwest of Yucca Valley, directly south of the Johnson Valley, and southeast of the Lucerne Valley.

They support an ecotone or ecological transition zone, that including Yuccas and Joshua trees on the desert floor and stands of Jeffrey Pine at higher elevations.

== Bighorn Mountain Wilderness Area ==
The 26,543 acres (10,742 ha) Bighorn Mountain Wilderness Area protects the north−central (BLM) and western areas of the range (San Bernardino National Forest).

A section of the eastern Bighorn Mountains is protected within Sand to Snow National Monument.

== See also ==
- Natural history of the Mojave Desert
- San Bernardino Mountains topics
