= Martin Nordegg =

German entrepreneur and pioneer (1868-1948)

- Born: July 18, 1868
- Died: September 13, 1948 (aged 80)
- Occupations: Entrepreneur; pioneer

Martin Nordegg (/ˈnɔːrdɛɡ/; né Cohn) (18 July 1868 – 13 September 1948) was a German entrepreneur, pioneer, and founder of the community of Nordegg, Alberta.

== Early life ==
The son of Moritz Cohn, a Jewish rabbi, and Auguste Cohn, Martin Cohn was born in Reichenbach, Silesia (current-day Dzierżoniów, Poland), which was then part of the North German Confederation. He received a classical education before joining the military. He was discharged in 1894 after suffering an injury to his arm. Moving to Berlin, Martin studied photochemistry under the direction of Professor Hermann Wilhelm Vogel at the Gewerbe Institut.

== Berlin years ==
Martin began working for Georg W. Büxenstein at the Georg Büxenstein & Company Photochemigraphical Institute, a printing firm. The two men would eventually become close business partners. While working at the institute, Martin met Colonel Onésiphore-Ernest Talbot, a Canadian Member of Parliament, who was impressed by Martin. Talbot suggested that he should to come to Canada to invest during the rapid colonization of the West. Martin consulted Büxenstein, and Martin was provided with $60,000 by German investors to travel to Canada to discover a profitable venture.

== Arrival in Canada ==
On 1 May 1906, Martin arrived in Ottawa to meet with Colonel Talbot. Martin was introduced to Prime Minister Wilfrid Laurier, who suggested that Martin should invest in mining. After failing to discover nickel in Northern Ontario, Martin set his sights westward and decided to look for coal in the Canadian Rockies.

== Journey into the North Saskatchewan River corridor ==
Along with geologist Donaldson Bogart Dowling (D. B. Dowling) of the Geological Survey of Canada and Stuart Kidd, Martin journeyed from Morley, Alberta to the North Saskatchewan River Corridor via the Pipestone Pass. The mining expedition discovered coal by the Bighorn and South Brazeau (now Blackstone) Rivers. Martin, who knew virtually nothing about geology or coal mining in Canada, learned quickly from his friend Dowling.

== Return to Germany ==
Martin took a coal sample from the South Brazeau field back to Germany with him to show to his investors. Büxenstein suggested they consult an expert on coal, Professor Potonié of the Berlin Academy of Mining. Martin's meeting with Potonié was a disaster. After claiming that he had discovered coal in the Canadian Rockies, Martin was surprised when the professor adamantly pronounced this to be impossible. According to the professor, the Rocky Mountains were Cretaceous and therefore could not possibly contain coal. Potonié pronounced Martin a liar, and Martin dashed out of the room to get away from the incensed professor, who threw the lump of coal at him. Professor Potonié was later persuaded to visit Canada to examine the supposed coalfields for himself. He was proven wrong and forced to concede the existence of coal in the Rocky Mountains. In 1909, the company Brazeau Collieries Ltd. was established, named after the South Brazeau River, where they planned to eventually construct a coal mine and community.

== Name change and discovery of the Nordegg Coal Basin ==
In 1909, Martin Cohn legally changed his surname to Nordegg, which roughly means "north corner" in German. The next year, while hunting by a lake (later named Fish Lake) near the North Saskatchewan River, Martin noticed black, lateral striations in the hillside. Upon further examination, it turned out to be coal. This was quite a discovery for the non-geologist; in fact, two other geologists, D. B. Dowling and James McEvoy, had passed by the coal field numerous times without discovering it. They were very surprised when Martin showed it to them. Impressed with Martin, Dowling declared, "We will name it 'The Nordegg Coal Basin' ". It was later decided that this coalfield should be the first to be developed, due to its closer proximity to Rocky Mountain House than the other fields. By 1912, coal mining operations had commenced.

== Founding of Nordegg and Martin's departure ==
With the completion of the railway between Rocky Mountain House and the mine, the community of Nordegg was established in 1914. One of Martin's business partners, William MacKenzie, named the community in his honour to commemorate the work he did in developing the mine and community. On 28 July 1914, World War I began. Martin began to be viewed with suspicion due to his German ancestry. On 4 June 1915, Martin left Nordegg by request of the Canadian government and spent the remainder of the war in exile in the United States. After the war ended, Martin attempted to re-establish himself in Nordegg. However, Donald Mann and the Lazard Brothers, board members in Brazeau Collieries, voted him out of the company, despite William MacKenzie's wish to reinstate Martin in his former position. Martin therefore sold all the German shares in the company and moved on to live in Ottawa, where he worked closely with the Canadian government to help newcomers get established in Canada. In particular, Martin helped refugees escaping the Nazis before the Second World War get financial footing in North America.

== Personal life ==
While doing sales for Georg Büxenstein in England, Martin met his future first wife, Berthe-Marie Brand, in May 1897. On 15 December 1897, the two married after discovering that Berthe-Marie was pregnant. Their only child, Marcelle Florence Cohn, was born on 20 July of the next year. Happy together for the first few years, their relationship eventually deteriorated as Berthe-Marie's health declined while Martin simultaneously abandoned her for his ventures in Canada.

In 1917, while seeing a play in New York City with Berthe-Marie and his daughter, Marcelle, Martin became captivated with one of the female performers. Her name was Sonia Marcelle (an intentional corruption of her original surname, Meisel). Martin eventually married Sonia, shortly after his first wife, Berthe-Marie, died on 5 July 1924. Martin and Sonia moved to New York City in 1937. After surviving a heart attack, Martin's health deteriorated, and he died on 13 September 1948.

== Works ==
- 1930: The fuel problem of Canada
- 1971: The Possibilities of Canada Are Truly Great: Memoirs 1906–1924
- 1995: To the Town that Bears Your Name: A Young Woman's Journey to Nordegg in 1912
