= Bighorn Dam =

Coordinates: 52°18′31.64″N 116°19′44.98″W

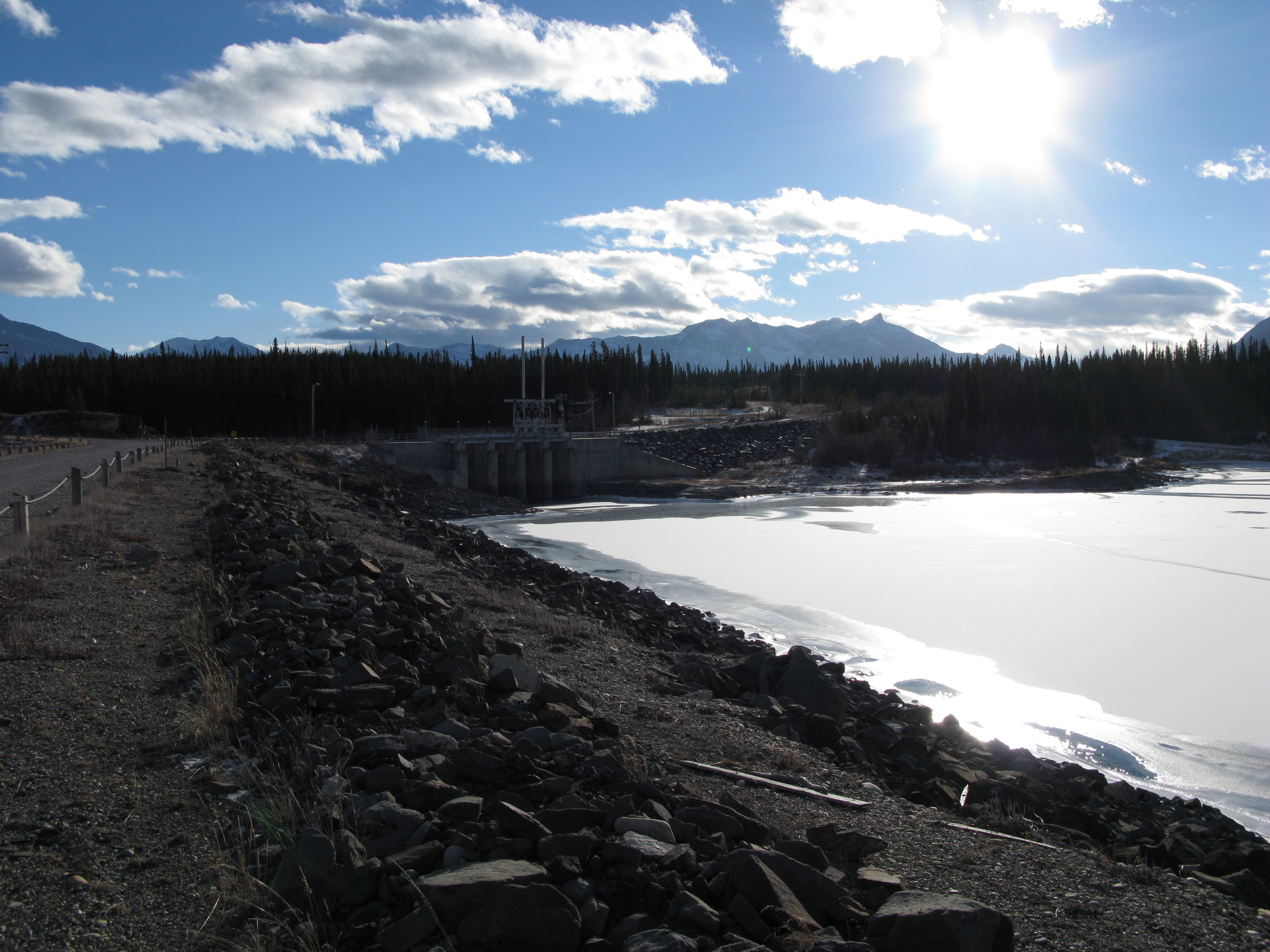
- A section of the Bighorn Dam
- Interactive map of Bighorn Dam
- Official name: Bighorn Dam
- Location: Clearwater County, Alberta, Canada
- Construction began: 1972
- Opening date: 1972
- Owner: TransAlta

Dam and spillways
- Type of dam: Embankment dam
- Impounds: North Saskatchewan River
- Height: 94m

Reservoir
- Creates: Lake Abraham
- Surface area: 53.7 km^{2} (20.7 sq mi)
- Maximum length: 32 km (20 mi)
- Maximum width: 3.3 km (2.1 mi)
- Normal elevation: 1,340 m (4,400 ft)

Power Station
- Commission date: 1972
- Hydraulic head: 91 m (299 ft) (Max)
- Installed capacity: 120 MW
- Capacity factor: 38.8%
- Annual generation: 408 GWh (1,470 TJ)

Bighorn Dam (or Bighorn Hydro Plant) is an embankment dam in Clearwater County in west-central Alberta, Canada. It was built by Calgary Power in 1972, and led to the creation of Lake Abraham, Alberta's largest reservoir. The dam and associated hydroelectric plant are managed by TransAlta.

Planning of the dam involved no evaluation of the social and environmental effects it may have caused, and no public hearings were held prior to the construction either. The construction of the Bighorn dam flooded the Kootenay Plains and stopped the livelihood (hunting and fur trapping) of the Bighorn Stoney Indigenous that had lived in that area. It had flooded their cabins, graves and pastures.

The Bighorn Plant is the second largest hydro facility owned by TransAlta (the largest being Brazeau Dam), with a capacity of 120 megawatts (MW). However, it has an available water supply that allows it to be the largest producer of hydroelectric energy in Alberta, with an average of 408 gigawatt-hours (1.47 PJ) each year.

The plant is one of two TransAlta hydroelectric plants on the North Saskatchewan River system in Alberta.

The dam was built in 1972 in the mountain gap at Windy Point, in the Front Ranges of the Canadian Rockies, west of the confluence of the North Saskatchewan River and the Bighorn River.

== Climate ==
Climate data for Bighorn Dam
Month	Jan	Feb	Mar	Apr	May	Jun	Jul	Aug	Sep	Oct	Nov	Dec	Year
Record high °C (°F)	14.0 (57.2)	15.5 (59.9)	21.0 (69.8)	25.0 (77.0)	29.0 (84.2)	33.3 (91.9)	33.0 (91.4)	33.0 (91.4)	31.1 (88.0)	25.5 (77.9)	16.5 (61.7)	15.5 (59.9)	33.3 (91.9)
Mean daily maximum °C (°F)	−1.1 (30.0)	1.0 (33.8)	4.3 (39.7)	9.3 (48.7)	14.1 (57.4)	18.0 (64.4)	21.2 (70.2)	20.7 (69.3)	15.7 (60.3)	9.9 (49.8)	2.4 (36.3)	−1.4 (29.5)	9.5 (49.1)
Daily mean °C (°F)	−7.2 (19.0)	−5.8 (21.6)	−2.2 (28.0)	2.8 (37.0)	7.5 (45.5)	11.5 (52.7)	14.2 (57.6)	13.5 (56.3)	8.6 (47.5)	3.7 (38.7)	−3.1 (26.4)	−7 (19)	3.0 (37.4)
Mean daily minimum °C (°F)	−13.2 (8.2)	−12.4 (9.7)	−8.7 (16.3)	−3.7 (25.3)	0.9 (33.6)	5.0 (41.0)	7.2 (45.0)	6.2 (43.2)	1.5 (34.7)	−2.6 (27.3)	−8.6 (16.5)	−12.5 (9.5)	−3.4 (25.9)
Record low °C (°F)	−44.5 (−48.1)	−43.5 (−46.3)	−36.1 (−33.0)	−21 (−6)	−13.5 (7.7)	−3.3 (26.1)	−3 (27)	−4.5 (23.9)	−11.5 (11.3)	−30.5 (−22.9)	−38 (−36)	−40 (−40)	−44.5 (−48.1)
Average precipitation mm (inches)	16.6 (0.65)	12.8 (0.50)	20.9 (0.82)	31.3 (1.23)	61.3 (2.41)	83.7 (3.30)	77.3 (3.04)	74.1 (2.92)	59.3 (2.33)	32.1 (1.26)	18.3 (0.72)	15.4 (0.61)	503.1 (19.81)
Average rainfall mm (inches)	0.6 (0.02)	0.7 (0.03)	2.1 (0.08)	10.1 (0.40)	47.7 (1.88)	83.2 (3.28)	77.3 (3.04)	74.0 (2.91)	48 (1.9)	12.5 (0.49)	1.9 (0.07)	1.2 (0.05)	359.1 (14.14)
Average snowfall cm (inches)	16.0 (6.3)	12.5 (4.9)	19.0 (7.5)	21.3 (8.4)	13.6 (5.4)	0.6 (0.2)	0.0 (0.0)	0.1 (0.0)	11.3 (4.4)	19.7 (7.8)	16.4 (6.5)	14.2 (5.6)	144.5 (56.9)
Average precipitation days (≥ 0.2 mm)	7.3	5.7	7.6	7.0	11.8	13.8	14.7	14.5	11.3	6.6	6.0	5.8	112.0
Average rainy days (≥ 0.2 mm)	0.2	0.3	0.2	1.8	9.5	13.8	14.7	14.4	10.0	3.2	0.5	0.2	68.8
Average snowy days (≥ 0.2 cm)	7.2	5.5	7.4	5.5	2.4	0.0	0.0	0.0	1.5	3.5	5.5	5.6	44.2
Source 1: Environment Canada
Source 2: Precipitation Days Only
