= Little Bighorn =

Little Bighorn may refer to:

- Little Bighorn River (previously called Little Big Horn River), a tributary of the Bighorn River in Wyoming and Montana
- Battle of the Little Bighorn, which took place near the river in 1876
- Little Bighorn Battlefield National Monument, preserves the site of the 1876 battle
- Little Big Horn College, two-year tribal college of the Crow Nation in Crow Agency, Montana
- Little Big Horn (film), a 1951 Western movie starring Lloyd Bridges
- Little Big Horn (album), a 1963 jazz album by Nat Adderley
