= Bighorn River (Alberta) =

River in Alberta, Canada

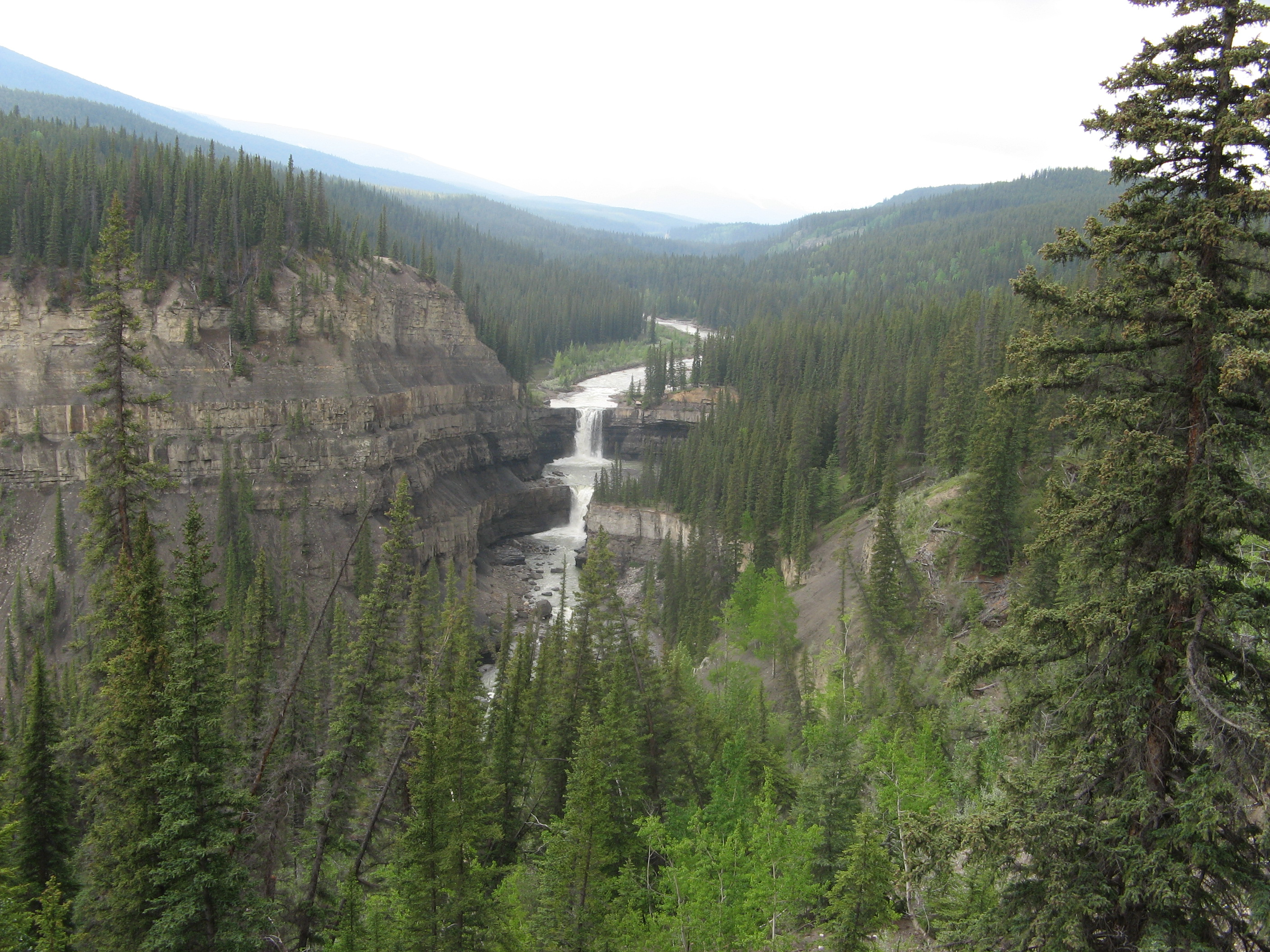
- Bighorn River Valley and Crescent Falls

Location
- Country: Canada
- Province: Alberta

Physical characteristics
- Source
  - location: Bighorn Meadows
  - coordinates: 52°17′34″N 116°32′39″W
  - elevation: 1,985 m (6,512 ft)
- Mouth
  - location: North Saskatchewan River
  - coordinates: 52°21′17″N 116°14′51″W
  - elevation: 1,216 m (3,990 ft)

The Bighorn River is a short river originating in the Alberta foothills, and is a tributary of the North Saskatchewan River. The river, as well as the nearby Bighorn Range and Bighorn Dam are named for the Bighorn sheep which dominate the area. The name first appeared in 1865.

Flowing under Mount McGuire, Bighorn River soon takes on Littlehorn and Sunkay Creeks, before plummeting over the impressive Crescent Falls. After the falls, the Bighorn travels through a significant canyon, before passing through the Bighorn Indian Reserve. The river then empties into the North Saskatchewan River after Lake Abraham.

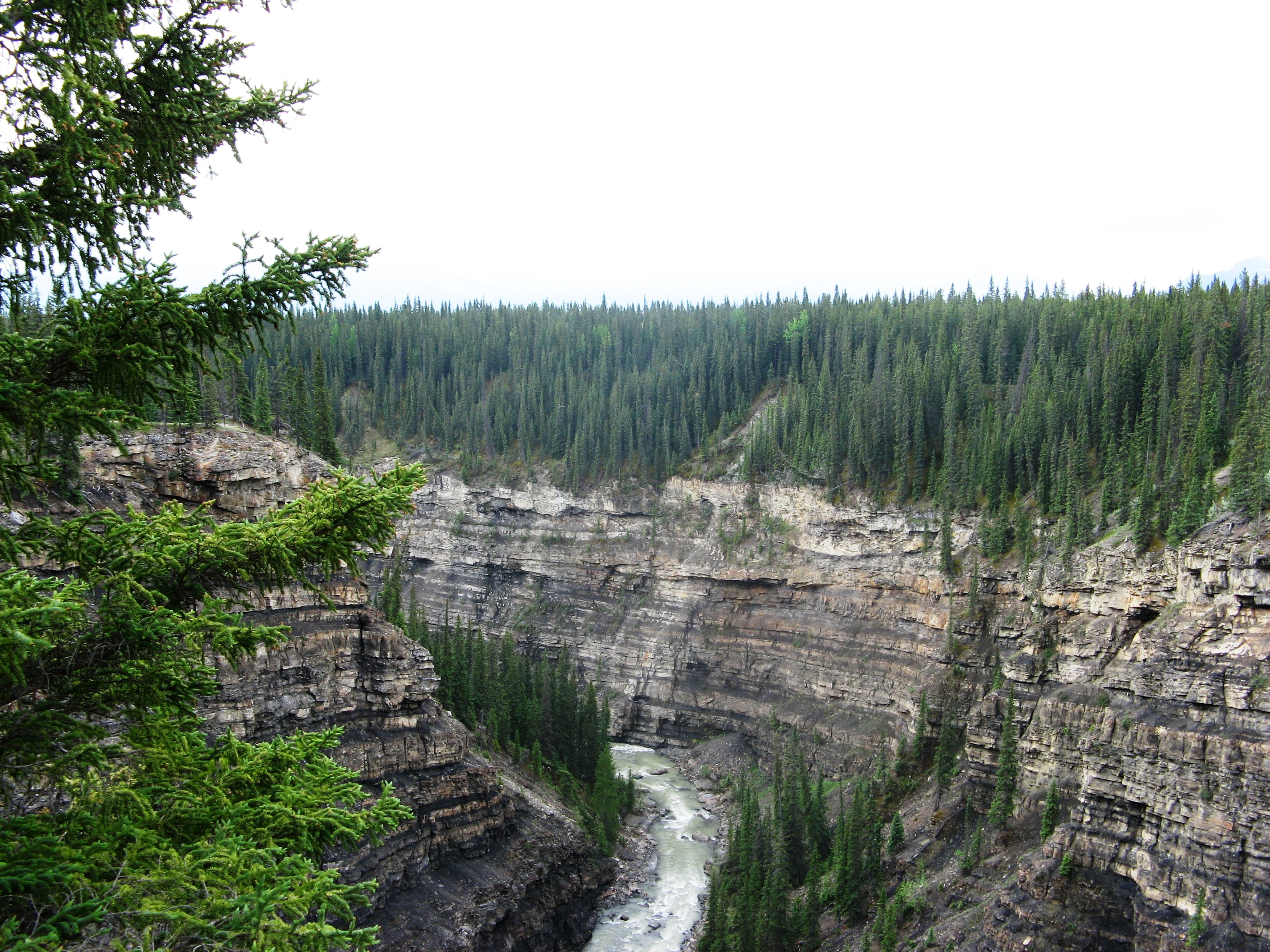
The Bighorn River Canyon

== See also ==
- List of Alberta rivers
