= Nordegg =

Nordegg Brazeau
- Hamlet
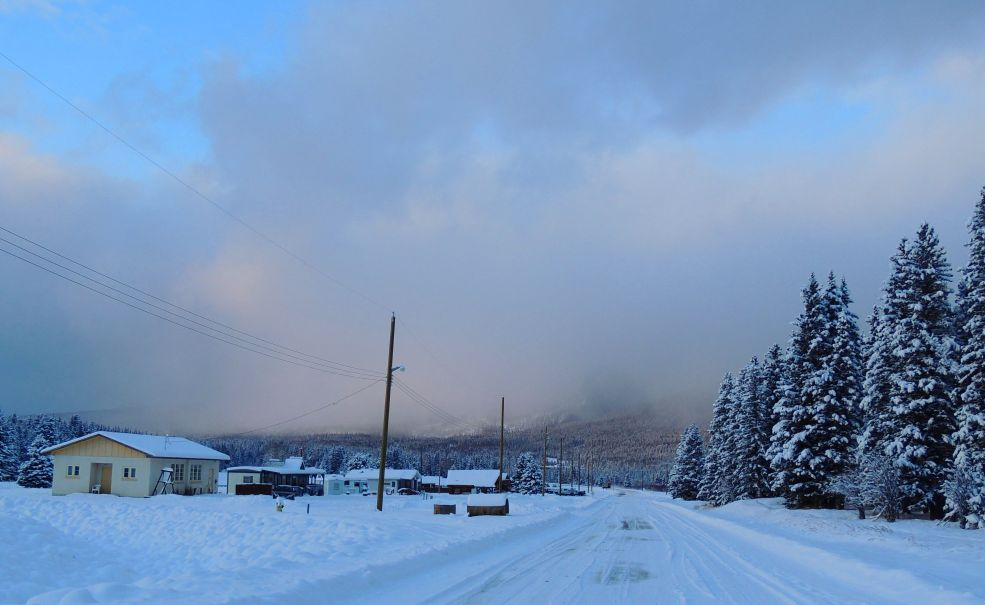

- Location of Nordegg in Alberta
- Coordinates: 52°28′14″N 116°4′31″W
- Country: Canada
- Province: Alberta
- Region: Central Alberta
- Census Division: No. 9
- Municipal district: Clearwater County
- Founded: 1914
- Named for: Martin Nordegg

Government
  - Reeve: John Vandermeer
  - Governing body: Clearwater County Council: Jim Duncan; Timothy Hoven; Theresa Laing; Cammie Laird; Daryl Lougheed; Michelle Swanson; John Vandermeer
  - MP: Yellowhead
  - MLA: Rimbey-Rocky Mountain House-Sundre
- Elevation: 1,287 m (4,222 ft)

Population (1986)
  - Total: 53
- Time zone: UTC−06:00 (Alberta Time)
- Postal code span: T0M 2H0
- Area code: +1-403
- Highways: Highway 11
- Waterways: Lake Abraham, Shunda Creek
- Website: nordeggliving.ca

Nordegg is a hamlet in west-central Alberta, Canada within Clearwater County. It is in the North Saskatchewan River valley in the foothills of the Canadian Rockies, just east of the intersection of the David Thompson Highway and the Highway 734 spur of the Bighorn Highway (the Forestry Trunk Road). A former coal mining town, it was named after Martin Nordegg and the name probably means "North Corner" in a German dialect. The railway station name at the locality was called Brazeau rather than Nordegg at certain points in its history, but the local post office has always been named Nordegg. The name Brazeau is now obsolete.

== History ==
In 1907, Martin Cohn (who later changed his surname to Nordegg) of the German Development Company, working with D.B. Dowling of the Geological Survey of Canada, staked claims covering coal deposits near the South Brazeau (now Blackstone), Bighorn, and North Saskatchewan rivers. At Nordegg's urging, Brazeau Collieries Ltd. was founded to exploit them, and the Canadian Northern Railway (which later became part of the Canadian National Railway) agreed to build a rail line to the northern part of the area. This led to the founding of the coal-mining town of Nordegg.

A small camp was established at the future townsite in 1911, coal production began in earnest in 1912, and the rail line, known as the Brazeau Branch, arrived at the town in 1913. Prior to that time, the Nordegg area was accessible only by horse. In 1914, the town was founded as one of the first planned communities in Alberta and it was named in honor of Martin Nordegg's efforts by railway entrepreneur William Mackenzie.

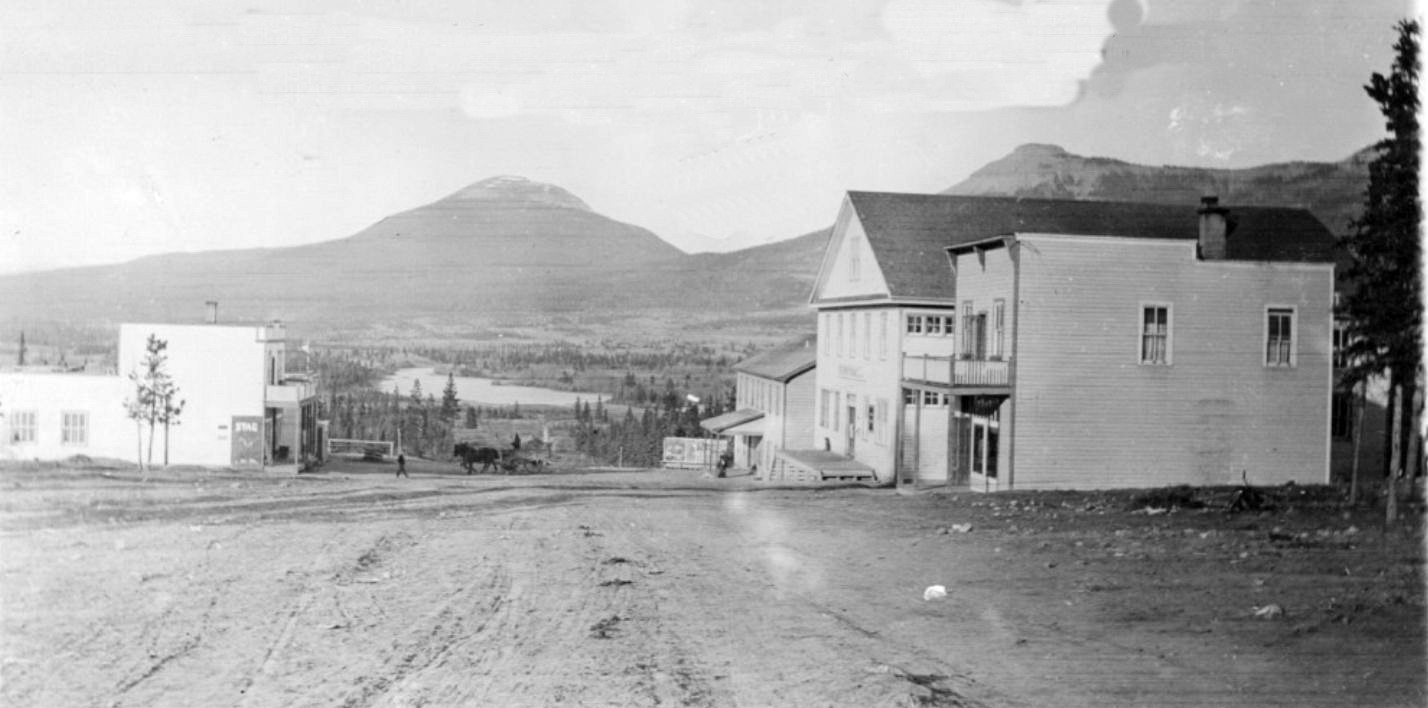
Nordegg, 1914

When World War I broke out, German assets in Canada were frozen. Martin Nordegg was permitted to remain at the town and supervise operations, but in the summer of 1915 he was asked to leave Canada. He was allowed to return in 1921, but he had lost his position with the mine.

The coal at Nordegg is part of the Gates Formation of the Luscar Group. Of the five coal seams at Nordegg, two were mined: the No. 2 and No. 3 Seams, which averaged 7.75 feet (2.36 m) and 15.92 feet (4.85 m) thick, respectively. They were separated by about 123 feet (37 m) of rock. They dipped at an angle of 12° and were worked by underground room and pillar methods. Production peaked at 500,000 short tons (450,000 t) in 1923, and the labor force at that time was about 800. Five small briquetting plants were added to the operation in 1937 to produce a marketable product from powdery, fine coal.

On 31 October 1941, a large underground explosion in the No. 3 Mine killed 29 miners. Mining resumed six weeks later, and during 1942 the Nordegg mine was one of the top coal-producing mines in Alberta. The town reached a maximum population of about 2,500 in the early 1940s, and a surface mining operation was added in 1946.

In 1950, a fire destroyed the tipple and five wooden briquetting plants. A new, more modern briquetting plant was then built of metal. It began operation at the end of 1951 but a large government debt had been incurred for its construction. Coal markets declined, primarily due to the decreasing use of steam coal as railroads replaced steam locomotives with diesel, and Brazeau Collieries closed permanently in 1955. Most people left after the mine closed, although a few families stayed on.

The coal reserves at Nordegg had not been exhausted, but mining never resumed. Total production had been about 9.6 million tonnes of low- to medium-volatile bituminous coal.

In 1951, a new briquette (compressed coal) plant opened, becoming one of the largest and most advanced briquette plants in North America. This ceased in 1955 , largely due to the transition of trains to diesel.

In 2001, the Nordegg Brazeau Collieries was declared a National Historic Site of Canada.

== Climate ==
Nordegg has a subarctic climate (Dfc) which can be considered a subalpine climate due to its altitude with locations on the same latitude having warmer climates. Summers are mild, with a few warm days sprinkled in here and there, while winters are cold and snowy.

Climate data for Nordegg, Alberta (1991–2020 normals, extremes 1960–present)
| Month | Jan | Feb | Mar | Apr | May | Jun | Jul | Aug | Sep | Oct | Nov | Dec | Year |
|---|---|---|---|---|---|---|---|---|---|---|---|---|---|
| Record high humidex | 15.0 | 13.2 | 19.6 | 24.4 | 27.3 | 37.9 | 36.6 | 32.6 | 29.9 | 25.2 | 19.8 | 13.1 | 37.9 |
| Record high °C (°F) | 16.7 (62.1) | 19.5 (67.1) | 20.2 (68.4) | 26.2 (79.2) | 29.5 (85.1) | 37.2 (99.0) | 35.6 (96.1) | 32.2 (90.0) | 31.0 (87.8) | 26.0 (78.8) | 20.0 (68.0) | 15.5 (59.9) | 37.2 (99.0) |
| Mean daily maximum °C (°F) | −2.3 (27.9) | 0.1 (32.2) | 3.8 (38.8) | 8.4 (47.1) | 13.6 (56.5) | 17.5 (63.5) | 21.0 (69.8) | 20.3 (68.5) | 15.9 (60.6) | 8.9 (48.0) | 1.7 (35.1) | −2.7 (27.1) | 8.9 (47.9) |
| Daily mean °C (°F) | −8.7 (16.3) | −7.1 (19.2) | −3.3 (26.1) | 1.7 (35.1) | 6.6 (43.9) | 10.6 (51.1) | 13.5 (56.3) | 12.6 (54.7) | 8.4 (47.1) | 2.4 (36.3) | −4.2 (24.4) | −8.6 (16.5) | 2.0 (35.6) |
| Mean daily minimum °C (°F) | −15.2 (4.6) | −14.3 (6.3) | −10.3 (13.5) | −5.1 (22.8) | −0.4 (31.3) | 3.7 (38.7) | 6.0 (42.8) | 4.8 (40.6) | 0.8 (33.4) | −4.2 (24.4) | −10.1 (13.8) | −14.5 (5.9) | −4.9 (23.2) |
| Record low °C (°F) | −47.2 (−53.0) | −47.0 (−52.6) | −40.5 (−40.9) | −26.0 (−14.8) | −16.5 (2.3) | −12.2 (10.0) | −6.7 (19.9) | −6.7 (19.9) | −16.0 (3.2) | −35.0 (−31.0) | −43.0 (−45.4) | −45.0 (−49.0) | −47.2 (−53.0) |
| Record low wind chill | −45.9 | −43.5 | −42.5 | −23.7 | −13.9 | −3.8 | −1.7 | −4.1 | −9.5 | −29.7 | −41.4 | −41.3 | −45.9 |
| Average precipitation mm (inches) | 17.8 (0.70) | 18.8 (0.74) | 25.1 (0.99) | 36.4 (1.43) | 66.9 (2.63) | 105.4 (4.15) | 78.7 (3.10) | 73.9 (2.91) | 52.7 (2.07) | 30.5 (1.20) | 23.4 (0.92) | 16.3 (0.64) | 545.9 (21.48) |
| Average rainfall mm (inches) | 0.0 (0.0) | 0.6 (0.02) | 0.7 (0.03) | 11.5 (0.45) | 48.6 (1.91) | 102.6 (4.04) | 76.6 (3.02) | 75.1 (2.96) | 48.2 (1.90) | 11.5 (0.45) | 0.9 (0.04) | 0.1 (0.00) | 376.4 (14.82) |
| Average snowfall cm (inches) | 18.7 (7.4) | 16.9 (6.7) | 24.6 (9.7) | 26.7 (10.5) | 18.5 (7.3) | 0.2 (0.1) | 0.0 (0.0) | 0.0 (0.0) | 6.2 (2.4) | 20.8 (8.2) | 21.4 (8.4) | 16.7 (6.6) | 170.7 (67.3) |
| Average precipitation days (≥ 0.2 mm) | 7.9 | 7.8 | 9.8 | 11.3 | 14.5 | 16.6 | 16.4 | 14.9 | 12.0 | 10.4 | 8.2 | 7.4 | 137.2 |
| Average rainy days (≥ 0.2 mm) | 0.0 | 0.25 | 0.71 | 5.9 | 13.6 | 16.8 | 15.9 | 15.3 | 12.0 | 6.3 | 0.41 | 0.06 | 87.23 |
| Average snowy days (≥ 0.2 cm) | 6.9 | 6.9 | 9.1 | 7.1 | 4.2 | 0.13 | 0.0 | 0.0 | 1.8 | 5.1 | 7.0 | 6.9 | 55.13 |
| Average relative humidity (%) (at 15:00 LST) | 54.5 | 47.1 | 44.0 | 44.4 | 44.7 | 48.7 | 47.0 | 48.8 | 50.1 | 50.4 | 55.0 | 59.4 | 49.5 |
Source: Environment Canada

== Demographics ==
Population history of Nordegg

| Year | Pop. | ±% |
|---|---|---|
| 1941 | 768 | — |
| 1951 | 875 | +13.9% |
| 1961 | 42 | −95.2% |
| 1966 | 133 | +216.7% |

| Year | Pop. | ±% |
|---|---|---|
| 1971 | 96 | −27.8% |
| 1976 | 129 | +34.4% |
| 1981 | 63 | −51.2% |
| 1986 | 53 | −15.9% |

Source: Statistics Canada

Nordegg recorded a population of 53 in the 1986 Census of Population conducted by Statistics Canada.

== Attractions ==
Most of the surface coal handling, processing and support facilities at Nordegg are still standing. They were declared a Provincial Historic Resource in 1992, and a National Historic Site of Canada in 2001. There are guided tours of the surface facilities during the summer months. Tours of the underground mine workings are not possible because most of the tunnels have collapsed. A stretch of about 16 feet (4.9 m) into the entrances of the No. 2 and No. 3 Mines has been restored and can be entered, but beyond that the entries are blocked.

A land exchange with the Province of Alberta has stimulated redevelopment of Nordegg. A mountain acreage community, the North Nordegg Subdivision, is developing north of Highway 11, adjacent to the Shunda Creek Hostel. Clearwater County has released plans for the redevelopment of downtown Nordegg, much of it on the footprint of the original townsite.

== See also ==
- List of communities in Alberta
- List of hamlets in Alberta
