= Abraham Lake =

Artificial lake and reservoir in Alberta, Canada

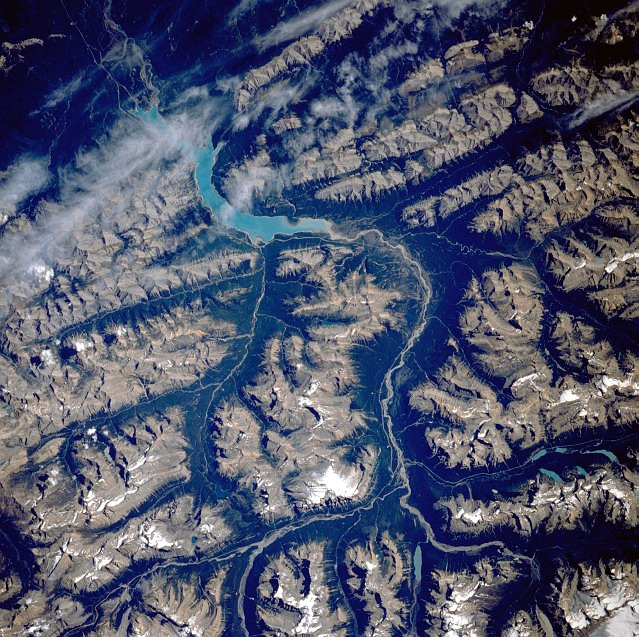
- Lake on the North Saskatchewan River

- Location within Alberta
- Location: Clearwater County, Alberta
- Coordinates: 52°13′25″N 116°25′38″W
- Type: Reservoir
- Etymology: Silas Abraham
- Primary inflows: North Saskatchewan River
- Primary outflows: North Saskatchewan River
- Basin countries: Canada
- Max. length: 32 km (20 mi)
- Max. width: 3.3 km (2.1 mi)
- Surface area: 53.7 km^{2} (20.7 sq mi)
- Surface elevation: 1,340 m (4,400 ft)

Abraham Lake, also known as Lake Abraham, is an artificial lake and Alberta's largest reservoir. It is located in the "Kootenay Plains area of the Canadian Rockies' front range", on the North Saskatchewan River in western Alberta, Canada.

== Description ==
Abraham Lake has a surface area of 53.7 km^{2} (20.7 sq mi) and a length of 32 km (20 mi). Although man-made, the lake has the blue colour of other glacial lakes in the Rocky Mountains, which is caused by rock flour.

Abraham Mountain, Elliott Peak, and the Cline River Heliport are located on the western shore of the lake. Mount Michener is situated on the eastern shore. Mount Ernest Ross lies at the southern tip of the lake.

== History ==
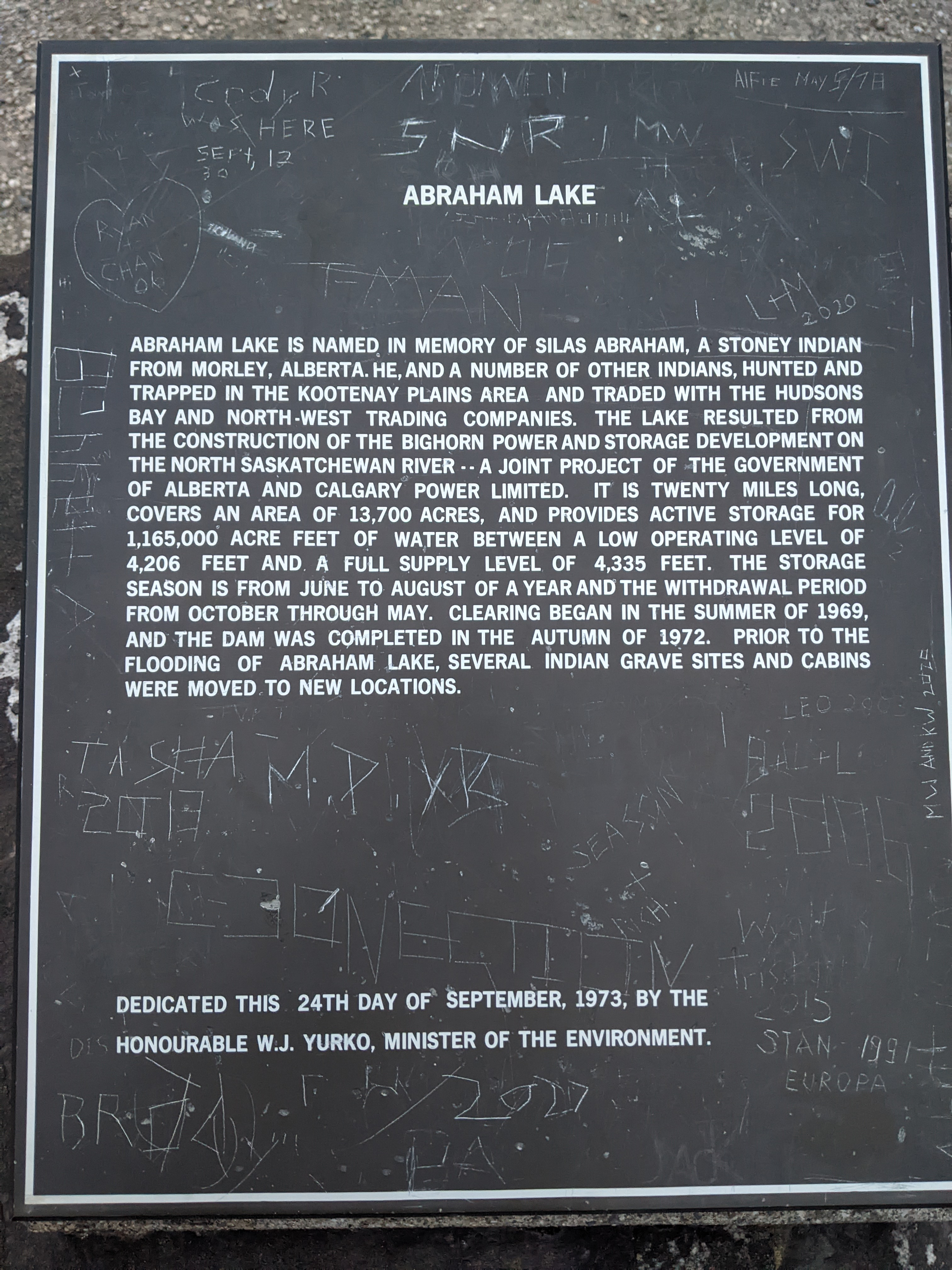
Plaque found at Abraham Lake

Abraham Lake was created by the former Calgary Power Company, now TransAlta, in 1972, with the construction of the Bighorn Dam. Planning of the dam involved no evaluation of the social and environmental effects it may have caused and no public hearings were held prior to the construction. Construction of the Bighorn Dam flooded the Kootenay Plains and stopped the livelihood (hunting and fur trapping) of the Bighorn band of the Stoney Nakoda First Nation that had lived in that area. It had flooded their cabins, graves and pastures.

The lake was built on the upper course of the North Saskatchewan River, in the foothills of the Canadian Rockies, and lines David Thompson Highway between Saskatchewan River Crossing and Nordegg.

The Government of Alberta sponsored a contest to name the lake in February 1972, during the final stages of construction of the Bighorn Dam. Students across the province were asked to submit names taking into consideration "historical significance, prominent persons, geography and topography, and the value of the lake." It was eventually named after Silas Abraham (c. 1870 – 1964), of the Stoney Nakoda First Nation and originally from Morley, Alberta. He was a farmer and hunter who lived in the Kootenay Plains and later on the Big Horn 144A reserve.

== Phenomenon ==
Trapped methane causes frozen bubbles to form under the ice on the lake's surface. This phenomenon results when decaying plants on the lake bed release methane gas, which creates bubbles that become trapped within the ice, in suspended animation, just below the surface as the lake begins to freeze. The visual effects formed by the resulting stacks of bubbles, frozen while rising toward the surface, combined with the clear blue water, have made Abraham Lake a popular destination for photographers and nature observers. The ice coverage of the lakes varies throughout the winter. Abraham Lake is usually frozen by late December. Ideal viewing of the ice bubble season is from mid-January to mid-February.

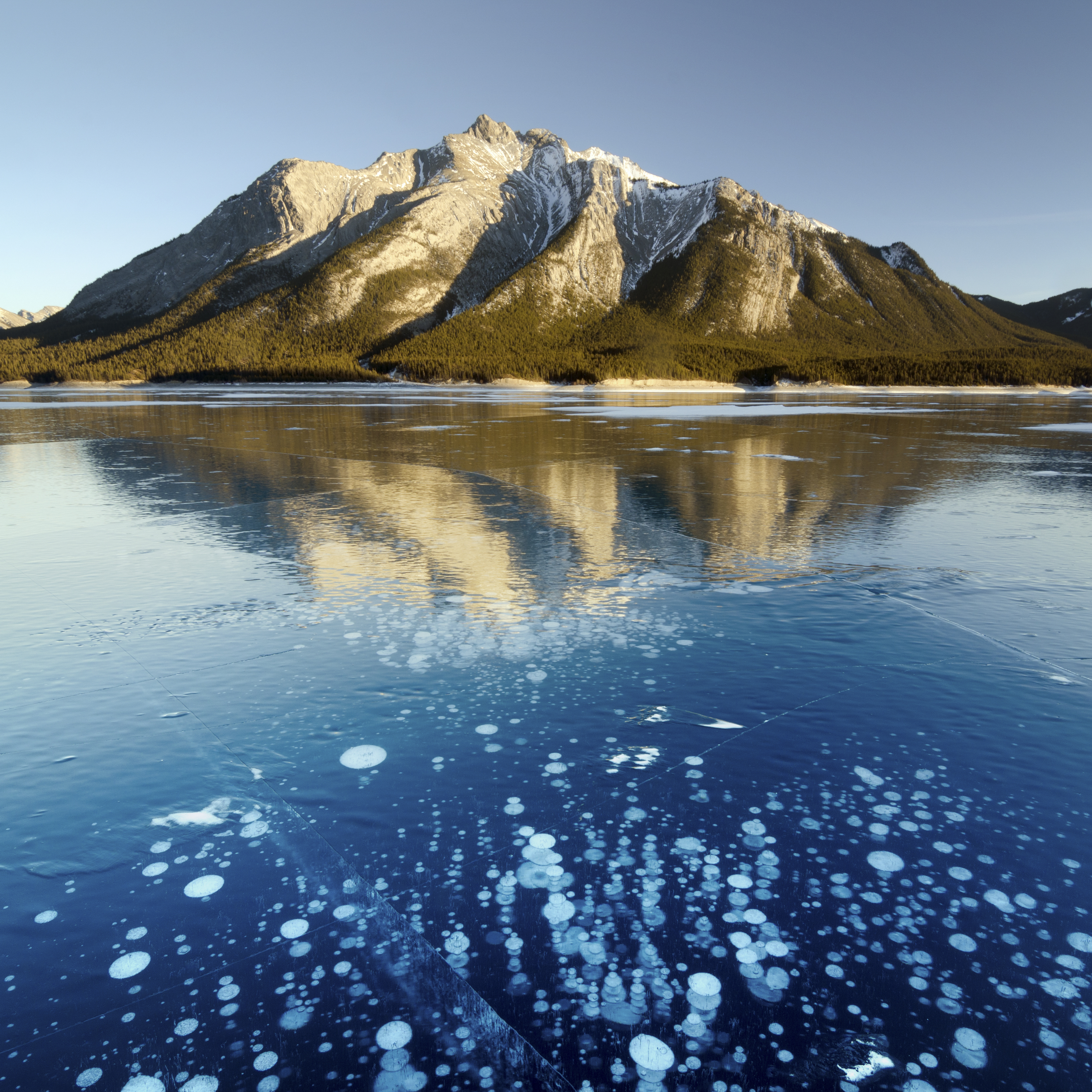
Bubbles on frozen Abraham Lake

== See also ==
- Lakes of Alberta
