= Monitor, Alberta =

- Hamlet
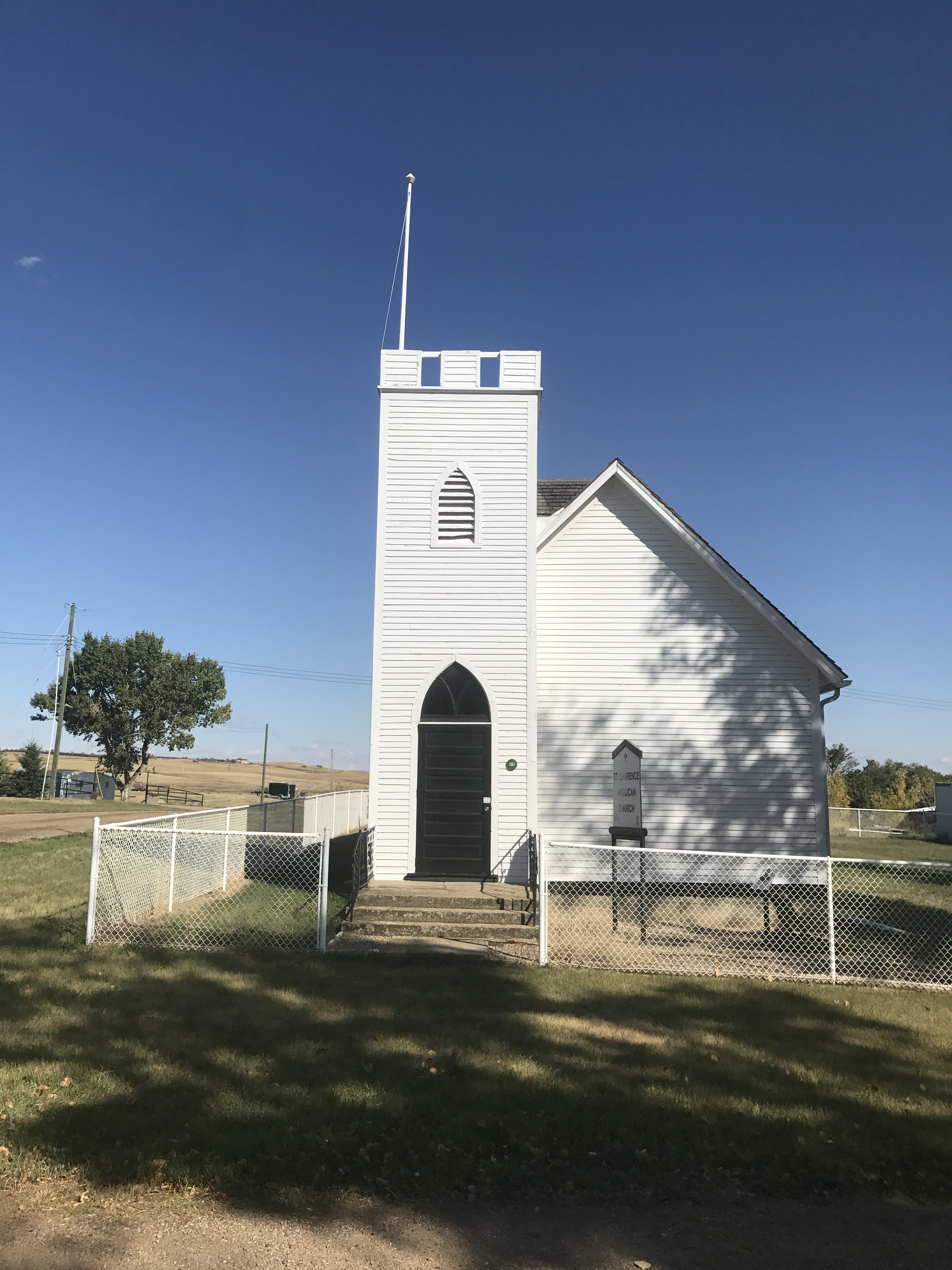
- St. Laurence Church in Monitor

- Location within Alberta Location within Canada
- Coordinates: 51°58′42″N 110°34′10″W
- Country: Canada
- Province: Alberta
- Special Area: No. 4

Government
  - Governing body: Special Areas Board

Population (1991)
  - Total: 60
- Time zone: UTC−06:00 (Alberta Time)
- GNBC Code: FCZKZ

Monitor is a hamlet in east-central Alberta, Canada within Special Area No. 4. Monitor is located on Highway 41, approximately 215 kilometres (134 mi) north of Medicine Hat.

== Toponymy ==
Monitor was named by an early settler and owner of the general store, Jack Deadmarsh, after a village in England that he had once visited.

Some sources suggest that Monitor, along with hamlets including Loyalist and Coronation, was among the localities given names intended to "patriotically" evoke the coronation of King George V. However, Monitor's inclusion in this list is not supported by local histories or reporting at the time.

== History ==
=== Founding and early establishment: 1911–1929 ===
The hamlet began as an offshoot of a nearby settlement named Sounding Lake. By 1911, Jack Deadmarsh operated a general store near Sounding Lake, neighboured by a butcher, Hugh McCarron. These businesses were squatting on land owned by C. W. Beesley.

That year, a Canadian Pacific Railway (CPR) surveyor, Robert Isaac Crisp, visited the area. Crisp recommended that the CPR's planned railroad should be built alongside the unnamed settlement, so the CPR tried to buy the lot from C. W. Beesley, intending to create a town. However, Beesley stipulated that he would only sell the land if the new township was named "Beesleyville," and no hotel would be opened. Businesses on Beesley's lot, including those run by Deadmarsh and McCarron, subsequently relocated to available land nearby.

The CPR asked residents to select a name for their new town. Residents initially suggested "Empress," but this was rejected by the Canadian Postal Service because another settlement in Alberta already bore that name. Deadmarsh suggested "Monitor," after a village he had visited in England.

In 1913, the Canadian Pacific Railway completed its construction of a Monitor train station, and a boarding house opened for business. A Monitor post office opened in December. Monitor developed quickly following the train line's introduction, spurred on by surveyor Crisp, who returned to England in 1914 and encouraged Anglican settlers to move to Monitor. The town's early economy centred around pastoral and dairy farming.

In 1916, a local newspaper, The Monitor News, began printing, and St. Laurence Church opened to serve Monitor's sizeable Anglican population. The church, which is today an entry into the Alberta Register of Historic Places, was also utilized as a place of worship by Monitor's Methodist and Lutheran congregations, and also served as a temporary schoolhouse. A permanent school was built the next year, but it was temporarily used as an emergency hospital during an outbreak of the Spanish flu epidemic in 1918.

318 men from Monitor and surrounding areas fought for Canada in the First World War. After the war, returning veterans founded a community association in Monitor.

In 1920, fields surrounding Monitor were prospected for oil. By then, Monitor's population of 275 residents was served by five grain elevators, three general stores, two restaurants, and a pharmacy, as well as recreational facilities including a pool room. Locals expressed interest in gaining town status to the Saskatoon Daily Star. Monitor's newspaper amalgamated with the Consort Enterprise of nearby Consort in June 1922.

=== Great Depression and development: 1930–1979 ===
As the Great Depression negatively impacted Monitor's economic opportunities, Monitor's population began to decline. From 137 residents in 1931, Monitor recorded 99 residents by 1936. Businesses that shut throughout the 1930s included Monitor's pharmacy, hotel, hardware store, and its branch of the Canadian Bank of Commerce. Arthur Kroeger, who lived for a time in Monitor as a child during the 1930s, would later recount some of his experiences in his 2007 book, Hard Passage.

During the Second World War, Monitor's association for WWI veterans became a branch of the Royal Canadian Legion. Members raised money for the war effort.

In 1951, Monitor's name was approved for federal mapping purposes. Three years later, 150 farmers from Pemukan, Monitor, Consort, and Loyalist met to form a rural electrification association. Their efforts led to Monitor receiving electricity in 1954, followed by connection to natural gas services in 1958.

The parish of St. Laurence, faced with dwindling attendance numbers, reduced its operations in 1972 to offer only summer services. Monitor's population stood at 77 in 1974, of which roughly a quarter were retirees; six commercial ventures operated in the area.

=== Hamlet: 1980–present ===
Monitor was declared a hamlet by the Government of Alberta in 1983. All services at St. Laurence Church ended in 1987. A group of locals formed the Monitor Historical Society in 1988 to purchase the building from the Diocese of Calgary for $10, and assumed responsibility for its upkeep.

Monitor had a population of around 60 in 1993. No stores remained open in the hamlet. That year, the provincial government designated the church to be a historic resource, protecting it from alteration or demolition.

The Monitor Historical Society hosted an event at St. Laurence Church in August 2015 to celebrate the building's centennial. In September 2024, the society organized a service at the church to fundraise for the building's upkeep. It was attended by Danielle Kurek, wife of Damien Kurek, as well as descendants of Monitor's early settlers.

== Demographics ==
Monitor recorded a population of 60 in the 1991 Census of Population conducted by Statistics Canada.

== Economy and services ==
=== Economy ===
As of 2026, a combined campground and RV park is operational in Monitor.

=== Services ===
In 2016, Monitor was connected to a waterline to receive potable water from Stettler.

== Places of interest ==
Monitor Cemetery, established shortly after St. Laurence Church was built in 1915, remains operational as of 2024.

== Notable residents ==
- Arthur Kroeger – academic and civil servant who detailed his childhood in Monitor in his 2007 book, Hard Passage

== See also ==
- List of communities in Alberta
- List of former urban municipalities in Alberta
- List of hamlets in Alberta
