= Federal, Alberta =

Federal
- Hamlet
- Location of Federal in County of Paintearth No. 18 Federal (Alberta)
- Coordinates: 52.111226°N 111.572613°W
- Country: Canada
- Province: Alberta
- Region: Central Alberta
- Census division: No. 7
- Municipal District: County of Paintearth No. 18

Government
  - Type: Unincorporated
  - Governing body: County of Paintearth Council
- Time zone: UTC−06:00 (Alberta Time)
- Highways: Highway 12

Federal is a hamlet located in the County of Paintearth No. 18 in Central Alberta, Canada. It is approximately 10 kilometres (6.2 mi) west of the town of Coronation and 27 kilometres (17 mi) east of the town of Castor. Federal was formerly a village. Following the Coronation of George V and Mary in 1911, many places along the Canadian Pacific Railway were given patriotic and royal-themed names, Coronation, Veteran, Consort, Throne, Loyalist, and Federal.

== See also ==
- List of hamlets in Alberta
