= Bulwark, Alberta =

Unincorporated community in Alberta, Canada

Bulwark
- Unincorporated community
- Grain elevator in Bulwark, Alberta

- Location within Alberta Location within Canada
- Coordinates: 52.241°N 111.591°W
- Country: Canada
- Province: Alberta
- County: County of Paintearth No. 18
- First settled: 1900s
- Decline: 1960s

Population
  - Total: 0
- Time zone: Alberta Time
- Area code: 403

Bulwark is an unincorporated community in the County of Paintearth No. 18, Alberta, Canada. It was formerly known as Lindsville before 1916. The community reached a peak population of under 100 residents in the 1920s, before it faced a decline in the 1960s. Today, much of the community still remains, but most structures are in rickety condition.

== Toponymy ==
The settlement was known as Lindsville until February 1916, when the settlement was renamed to Bulwark. There is no certain factual evidence for the choice of the name Bulwark, but it is theorized that since the settlement pivoted areas such as Coronation, Consort, and Fleet, and since the definition of "bulwark" is a defence line above the water line in a warship, Bulwark was named in association with the rail line.

== History ==
=== Pre-settlement ===
Bulwark was first established by settlers in the early 1900s. It was situated along a CPR rail line that started in Coronation and ended in Lorraine.

=== Founding and growing community: 1900s - 1960s ===
In 1908, the first post office opened. The settlement began to have grain elevators built at the site, along with general stores. In 1914, Bulwark was operated as a community hub, but it never incorporated as an independent municipality.

Bulwark reached almost 100 citizens by the late 1920s. In 1927, Bulwark boasted a range of structural buildings, including five grain elevators, three lumber yards, two general stores, a hardware store, garage, school, bank, butcher, pharmacy, livery yard, dance hall, pool, a real estate economic, and two churches, one being Catholic and one being United. A blacksmith also arrived to stay. Social functions were held regularly in the dance hall and pool room. Five grain elevators were constructed in an attept to achieve the second largest grain hall ever seen in the province at the time.

The Oglivie General Merchant store in 1955

Plans were made for the extention of the railway, such as continuing the line from Bulwark and connecting it to Edmonton. However, this arrangement never took place. The terrain from north of the town slowed down the progess, and rose costs. A fire commenced in 1923, and eventually, the Great Depression era, World War I, and World War II began, placing the town under extreme distress. Nevertheless, the town kept operating, but the plans for the railway extension had been forgotten.

=== Decline: 1960s ===
Bulwark's future looked promising but after many grain elevators dismantled and closed in the 1950s, the town started to decline. In the 1960s, many businesses began to close at a rapid pace, the school closed in 1960, and the last business to close was the Ogilvie General Merchant. The Canadian Pacific Railway removed Bulwark's tracks in 1962, and Canada Post closed down the post office in 1965.

== Present day ==
Today, a majority of the former settlement still remains. The Bulwark Cemetery still remains, three out of five of the grain elevators were demolished, and one of the grain elevators were moved. However, the Lunalta Limousin elevator still stands. Many houses still remain standing, but are in rickety condition. Random home accessories and objects lay dotting the landscape, and many abandoned cars still lay untouched. It is now seen as a ghost town.
