= School of Public Policy and Administration at Carleton University =

Public policy school of Carleton University

- Type: Public
- Established: 1953
- Parent institution: Carleton University
- Academic affiliations: Canadian Association of Programs in Public Administration
- Director: Graeme Auld
- Academic staff: 25
- Administrative staff: 6
- Postgraduates: 236
- Location: Ottawa, Ontario, Canada
- Campus: Urban
- Website: https://carleton.ca/sppa/

The School of Public Policy and Administration at Carleton University (SPPA) is the public policy school of Carleton University in Ottawa, Ontario, Canada. Established in 1953, it is Canada's oldest graduate school in the field of policy studies and public management. Since its establishment, it has produced several prominent leaders within the Canadian public and non-profit sectors, and has led research activities in this area.

The SPPA's administrative offices are located in Richcraft Hall on the Carleton University campus, with 25 faculty members and 236 students. It offers one doctoral program, three Master's programs, and five graduate diplomas.

The School boasts a strong national reputation, and is rated as the top public policy school in Canada by Corporate Knights, citing its academic rigour and research related to sustainable development. It is accredited by the Canadian Association of Programs in Public Administration (CAPPA).

== History ==
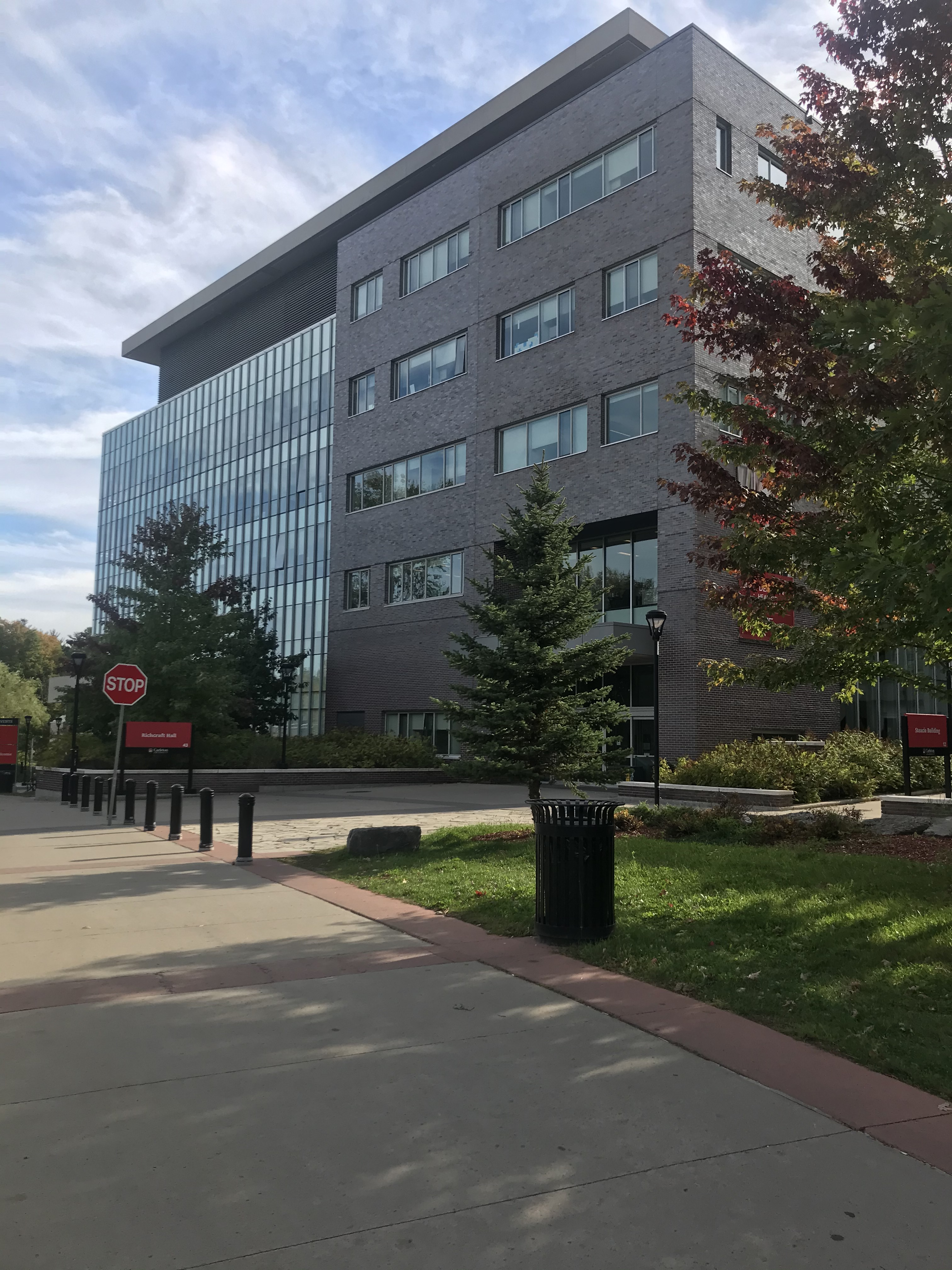
Richcraft Hall, the current home of the School of Public Policy and Administration

Creating an institute for public administration was one of the key visions of the Ottawa Association for the Advancement of Learning, the community group responsible for establishing Carleton University in 1942. By 1945, the Bachelor of Public Administration was introduced, becoming one of the first degree programs offered by Carleton, producing first cohort of graduates in 1946. The Bachelor of Public Administration was offered until the 1951–52 academic year, before being reorganized as a major offered through a Bachelor of Arts degree the following year.

Through a $200,000 contribution from the Atkinson Charitable Foundation of Toronto, the School of Public Administration was established in 1953, with the goal of further developing and enhancing research into the field of public administration, but also preparing students for careers in government. At the time, the school offered an Honours B.A. in Public Administration, a Certificate of Public Service Studies, a graduate diploma in Public Administration, and a Master of Arts in Public Administration.

In the 1960, the School began to intake students from Colombo Plan countries, many of whom held mid- and senior-level positions in the civil services of their home countries, providing them with specialized coursework delivered over a few weeks on public management taught by Carleton professors and senior Canadian civil servants. This program continued until the sometime in the early 1970s.

Beginning in the early 1980s, the School of Public Administration reintroduced its Bachelor of Public Administration, which would be offered until the 1998–1999 school year, which it turn was replaced by the Bachelor of Public Affairs and Policy Management in the new Arthur Kroeger College of Public Affairs.

In 1992, the School began offering a Ph.D. in Public Policy, distinguished for being the first of its kind in Canada. In 2001 the school was renamed the School of Public Policy and Administration (SPPA).

== Academics ==
=== Doctoral-level ===
==== Ph.D. in Public Policy ====
The Ph.D. program in Public Policy is a research-intensive doctorate program that provides students with the concepts and methods to undertake public policy research. Established in 1992, the Ph.D. in Public Policy is the oldest doctorate program in public policy, and admits six to nine students annually. Students are required to complete four core courses, three electives, a comprehensive exam, a research seminar, and a thesis, which can be done within five years of full-time study.

=== Master's-level ===
==== Master of Public Policy and Administration ====
The Master of Public Policy and Administration (MPPA) is a two-year graduate program focusing on public policy and public administration, preparing students for policy leadership roles in the professional and academic settings. Students can complete the program through a coursework, research essay, or thesis pathway. First offered in 1953, the program is one of the oldest and most renowned of its kind in Canada. The program consists of ten core courses spanning numerous subjects related to public management, including policy analysis, economics, political science, organizational theory, and ethics, plus four elective courses at the graduate level.

The program allows incoming students to receive an Advanced Completion Credit for up to 4 courses for the two quantitative and qualitative methods courses, and select economics and public policy courses where students can demonstrate at least a B+ grade in third or fourth-year undergraduate courses that cover the same subject matter.

Students in the MPPA also have the option to complete a co-op work term after successful completion of six core courses, with placements available at federal government departments and think tanks.

===== Specializations =====
The MPPA, in addition to its general course offering, allows students to tailor their degree toward specific areas. As of the 2020–21 academic year, these areas include:

- Indigenous Policy and Administration
- Data Science

==== Master of Arts in Sustainable Energy ====
The Master of Arts in Sustainable Energy is offered jointly between the SPPA and the Faculty of Engineering and Design. It combines elements of both engineering and public policy, giving students a broader understanding of policy and regulatory approaches to sustainable energy production.

==== Master of Philanthropy and Nonprofit Leadership (MPNL) ====
The Master of Philanthropy and Nonprofit Leadership is a graduate program that aims to prepare students for management-level positions in charities and nonprofit organizations. Established in 2012, it is one of Canada's leading programs for executive training in the non-profit sector. Coursework covers subject areas such as organizational theory, philanthropy, and program evaluation, in addition to a capstone project.

=== Graduate diplomas ===
The SPPA offers graduate diplomas geared toward mid-career professionals to upgrade their skills and knowledge in different areas relating to public policy and management. Graduate diplomas are delivered at a slower pace compared to Master's and doctorate programs, allowing students to balance both classroom and work obligations. As of the 2020–21 academic year, diploma offerings include:

- Policy and Program Evaluation
- Public Management
- Health Policy
- Sustainable Development
- Philanthropy and Nonprofit Leadership

== SPPA Research Centres ==
The Research Centres associated with the School offer specialized research, professional development and host seminars and visitors.

- Carleton Centre for Community Innovation (3ci)
- Carleton Sustainable Energy Research Centre (CSERC)
- Carleton Research Unit in Innovation, Science and Environment (CRUISE)
- Centre for Governance and Public Management (CGPM)
- Centre for Urban Research and Education (CURE)
- Centre for Policy and Program Assessment (CPPA)
- Regulatory Governance Initiative (RGI)
- Centre for Women in Politics and Public Leadership

The School is also a partner with the Independent Evaluation Group of the World Bank in the acclaimed International Program for Development Evaluation Training (IPDET). This executive training program brings about 200 professionals from 80 countries to Carleton for up to a month every summer to acquire practical skills for conducting and managing evaluation in a development context.

== Publications ==
=== Periodicals ===
- How Ottawa Spends (published by McGill-Queen's University Press) is a review of government policies and spending that has been produced annually since 1980.
- Innovation, Science and Environment (published by McGill-Queen's University Press) is a publication by faculty associated with CRUISE.

=== Academic journals ===
- ISEMA: Perspectives on Innovation, Science & Environment] is a peer-reviewed journal that publishes a selection of the top papers produced by students in the MA program that deal with innovation, science and environment topics. Launched in 2005, it has produced annual issues since.
- Northern Public Affairs is a public policy magazine for Northern Canada; its mandate it to create space for informed policy debate on the topics most relevant to Northerners. Founded in fall 2011, it publishes three issues a year, featuring articles written by, and for, an audience of academics, commentators, current and former politicians, business leaders, public servants, and engaged northerners.

== Notable alumni and faculty ==
- John G. Abbott (M.A. '80): Former Deputy Minister of Health and Community Services of Newfoundland and Labrador
- Yaprak Baltacioğlu (M.A. '89): Former Secretary of the Treasury Board and current Chancellor of Carleton University
- Steve Desroches (M.A. '00): Former Ottawa City Councillor and Deputy Mayor of Ottawa
- Barbara Grantham (M.A. '87): CEO of the Vancouver General Hospital and UBC Hospital Foundation
- Judy Taguiwalo (M.A. '92): Secretary of Social Welfare and Development, Government of the Philippines

== See also ==
- Public policy school
- Arthur Kroeger College of Public Affairs
- Norman Paterson School of International Affairs
- University of Ottawa's Graduate School of Public and International Affairs
