= Talbot, Alberta =

Ghost town in Alberta, Canada

Talbot
- Location within Alberta Location within Canada
- Coordinates: 52.230°N 111.266°W
- Country: Canada
- Province: Alberta
- County: County of Paintearth No. 18
- First settled: 1905
- Decline: 1911

Government
  - Postmaster: Samuel Davis

Population
  - Total: 0
- Time zone: Alberta Time
- Area code: 403

Talbot is an unincorporated community in east central Alberta, Canada, situated in the County of Paintearth No. 18, located along Highway 599. It is a locality and ghost town which was established in 1905 and had a growing community before its decline in 1911. The Talbot Community Hall is the last remnant of the community, and still remains active today.

== Toponymy ==
The name Talbot was chosen in honour of Peter Talbot, a prominent politician who did extensive work for the farming community in Alberta, and also helped guide Alberta into provincial status. Talbot became the senator of Alberta in 1906, and remained in office until his death in 1919.

== History ==
=== Pre-settlement ===
Years prior to the foundation of the settlement, several wooden poles had been placed in the ground by surveyors. Reportedly, there was a belief that a railway would arrive through the area.

=== Founding and growing community: 1905 – 1910 ===
Talbot was first settled in 1905. That year, a man from Kansas, United States, named Samuel Davis, moved to Alberta and arrived to the area. Davis, his wife, two sons, and seven daughters felt it was a suitable location to stay. Over the next four months they began constructing a house to live in, and slept in tents during the process. On July 22, 1905, they finished the construction, and July 22 was celebrated locally for years with an annual picnic.

In March 1907, a post office opened, owned by Davis. The family founded a business and Davis opened a general store in which he bought a variety of items, including clothing, hardware, and groceries. A barn was constructed to house the teams of horses that carried wagonloads of people.

The settlement continued to expand rapidly, and meals and beds were offered to new living quarters, and the North-West Mounted Police made Talbot a stopping point when they travelled through Battleford and Stettler. A lumberyard was established at the settlement, owned by a local known as "Mr. Bentley". A blacksmith also appeared, named Andrew Young. As the settlement expanded, a carrier named William Balley arrived, and worked with someone known as "Mr. Maxon". Church services were also attended, held in the home of the Davis family, and wedding services were also occasionally attended.

On October 4, 1908, a fire commenced in Talbot, destroying the Davis home. In response, residents of the community transported lumber from Hardisty, cleaned debris, and constructed of a two-story, eight bedroom house for the Davis family to retain the post office and discard with the business. A new store was established, owned by a local named Albert Caseley.

=== Decline: 1911 ===
A period of decline soon followed. In 1911, the Canadian Pacific Railway shifted its planned route. Instead of passing through Talbot, the tracks ran 16 km (9.9 mi) south through what is now Coronation, bypassing Talbot and establishing the rail town of Coronation. Talbot was gradually abandoned for businesses and settlers to re-locate closer to the new rail town of Coronation. In 1912, the Davis family moved to California to subsist on.

== Present day ==
In 2017, the Talbot general store was removed, and the original settlement has entirely disappeared. The Talbot Community Hall still stands, being the last remnant of Talbot. The hall is still active as a community gathering space and stands as the sole surviving monument to Talbot. The Talbot Community Hall includes kitchen facilities, baseball diamonds, disking, sound systems, and seatings.
