= Loyalist, Alberta =

Loyalist
- Hamlet
- Location of Loyalist in Special Area No. 4 Loyalist (Alberta)
- Coordinates: 51.985252°N 110.957289°W
- Country: Canada
- Province: Alberta
- Region: Southern Alberta
- Census division: No. 4
- Special Area: Special Area No. 4

Government
  - Type: Unincorporated
  - Governing body: Special Areas Board
- Time zone: UTC−06:00 (Alberta Time)
- Highways: Highway 12

Loyalist is a hamlet located in Special Area No. 4 in Alberta, Canada. It is located approximately 11.4 km (7.1 mi) east of the village of Veteran and 12.5 km (7.8 mi) west of the village of Consort. Following the Coronation of George V and Mary in 1911, many places along the Canadian National Railway were given patriotic and royal-themed names, including Coronation, Veteran, Consort, Throne, and Loyalist.

== History ==
The district which included Loyalist, then known as Improvement District 333, was opened for homesteading in 1908. The CN Railway arrived in the area in 1912. At its peak (1912–1939), Loyalist had a post office, a general store, a butcher shop, a grocery store, three restaurants, a lumber yard, five grain elevators, a pool hall, a school, a blacksmith shop, a barber shop, a community hall, a train station, a bank, and a meat market.

== See also ==
- List of hamlets in Alberta
