= Neutral Valley, Alberta =

Neutral Valley, Alberta may refer to:

- Neutral Valley, Special Area No. 4, Alberta, a locality in Special Area No. 4, Alberta
- Neutral Valley, Parkland County, Alberta, a locality in Parkland County, Alberta
