= Canadian Foreign Policy Journal =

- Discipline: International relations
- Language: English

Publication details
- History: 1993-present
- Publisher: Norman Paterson School of International Affairs (Canada)
- Frequency: Triannually

Standard abbreviations
- ISO 4: Can. Foreign Policy J.

Indexing
- ISSN: 1192-6422

Links
- Journal homepage

The Canadian Foreign Policy Journal is a triannual peer-reviewed academic journal published by the Norman Paterson School of International Affairs (Carleton University). It covers contemporary issues related to Canadian foreign policy such as trade, economics, politics, security, defense, development, environment, immigration, and intelligence. According to OpenCanada, the journal is one of five leading Canadian foreign policy journals. Research published in the journal has been featured on the University of Maryland's National Consortium for the Study of Terrorism and Responses to Terrorism.
