= Compeer, Alberta =

Compeer
- Hamlet
- Location of Compeer Compeer (Canada)
- Coordinates: 51°51′34″N 110°00′47″W
- Country: Canada
- Province: Alberta
- Region: Central Alberta
- Census division: 4
- Special area: Special Area No. 4

Government
  - Type: Unincorporated
  - Governing body: Special Areas Board

Population (1991)
  - Total: 21
- Time zone: UTC−06:00 (Alberta Time)
- Area codes: 403, 587, 825

Compeer is a hamlet in east-central Alberta, Canada within Special Area No. 4. Previously an incorporated municipality, Compeer dissolved from village status on December 31, 1936, to become part of the Municipal District of Neutral Hills No. 331.

Compeer is located on an abandoned track of the Railink Central Western railway, north of Highway 12 and west of the Alberta–Saskatchewan border. It is approximately 14 kilometres (8.7 mi) east of Altario.

Founded in 1901, Compeer was a spot Aboriginals used to camp. Its literal meaning is camp here. When explorers came to Compeer, natives told them to camp here. Due to a misinterpretation, explorers thought the area was called Compeer.

== Demographics ==
Population history of Compeer
Year	Pop.	±%
1901		—
1906		—
1911		—
1916		—
1921		—
1926		—
1931	94	—
1936	88	−6.4%
1941		—
1946		—
1951		—
1956		—
1961		—
1966		—
1971		—
1976		—
1981		—
1986		—
1991	21	—
Source: Statistics Canada

Compeer recorded a population of 21 in the 1991 Census of Population conducted by Statistics Canada.

== See also ==
- List of communities in Alberta
- List of former urban municipalities in Alberta
- List of hamlets in Alberta
