= Altario =

- Hamlet
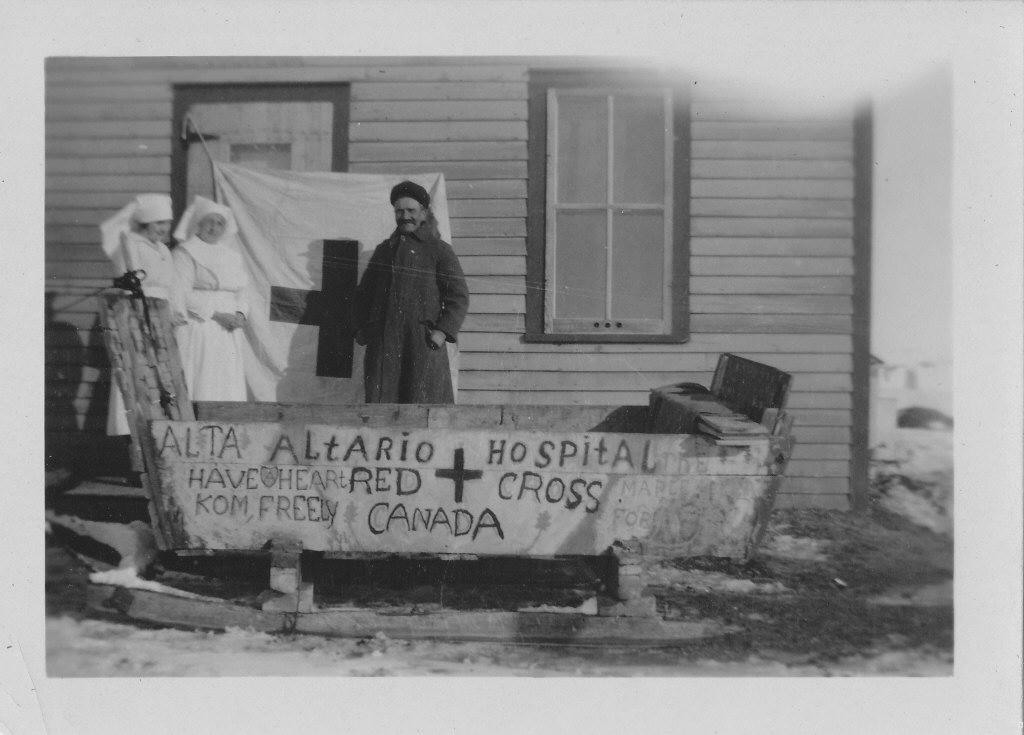
- First Red Cross Hospital in Western Canada opened 1920

- Location of Altario Altario (Canada)
- Coordinates: 51°55′07″N 110°9′44″W
- Country: Canada
- Province: Alberta
- Region: Central Alberta
- Census division: 4
- Special area: Special Area No. 4

Government
  - Type: Unincorporated
  - Governing body: Special Areas Board

Population (1991)
  - Total: 26
- Time zone: UTC−06:00 (Alberta Time)
- Area codes: 403, 587, 825

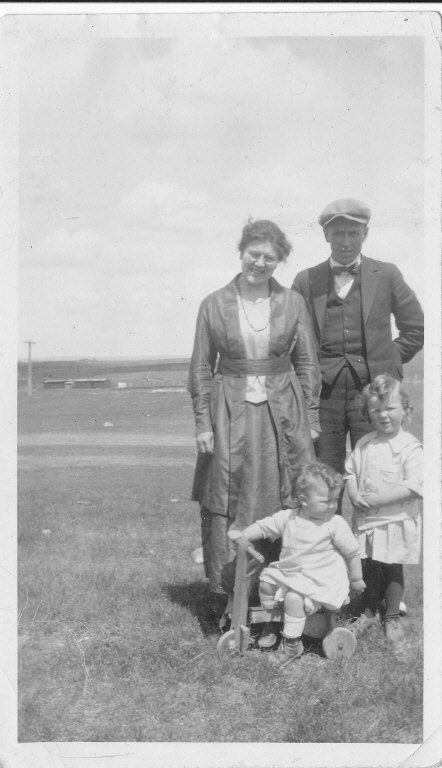
Altario about 1918

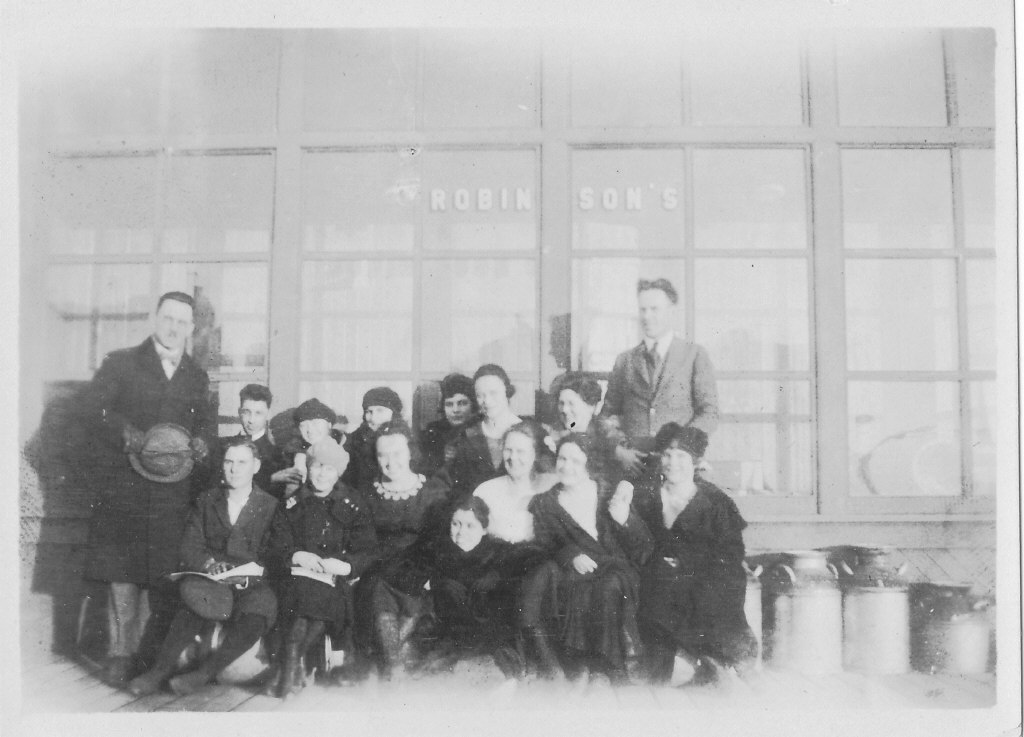
Robinson Department store

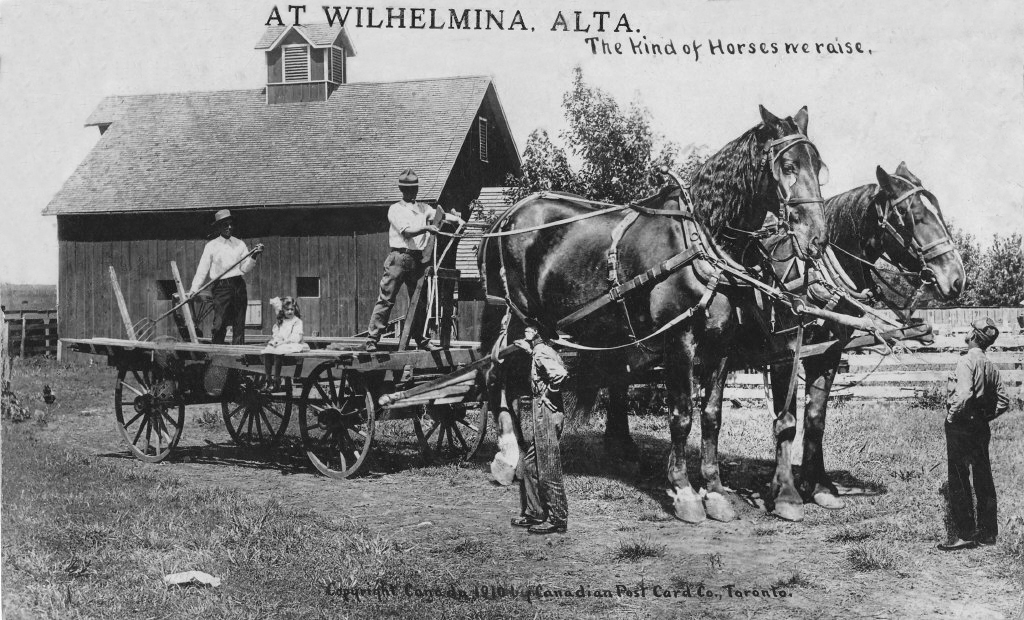
"Photoshopping" in the early 20th century

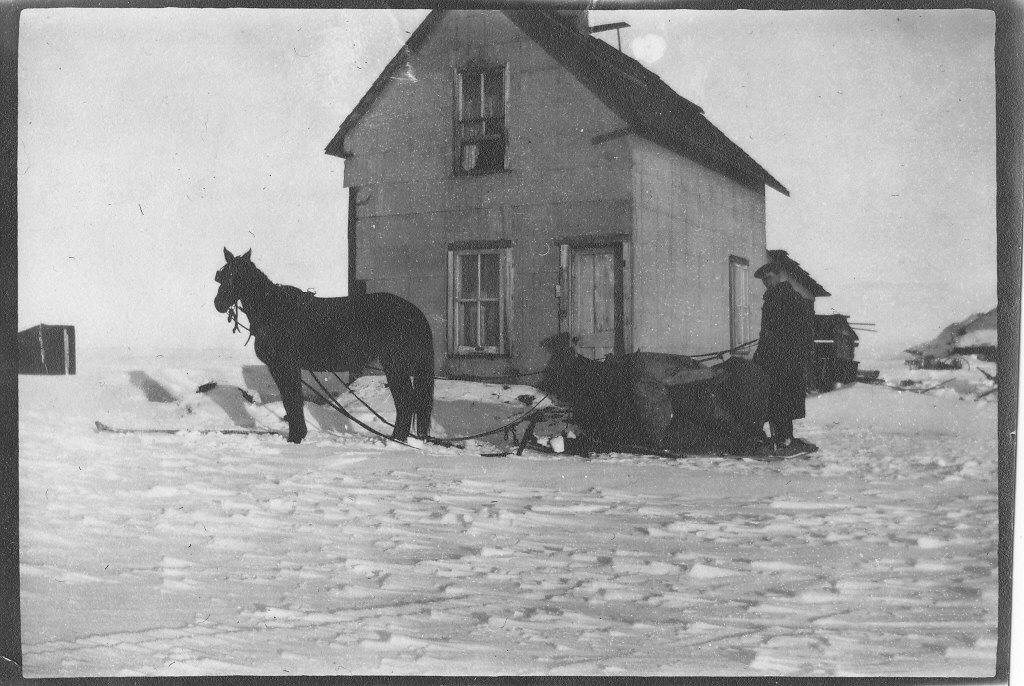
Porterfield Robinson house after lean-to part--post office--moved into new site 4 miles north

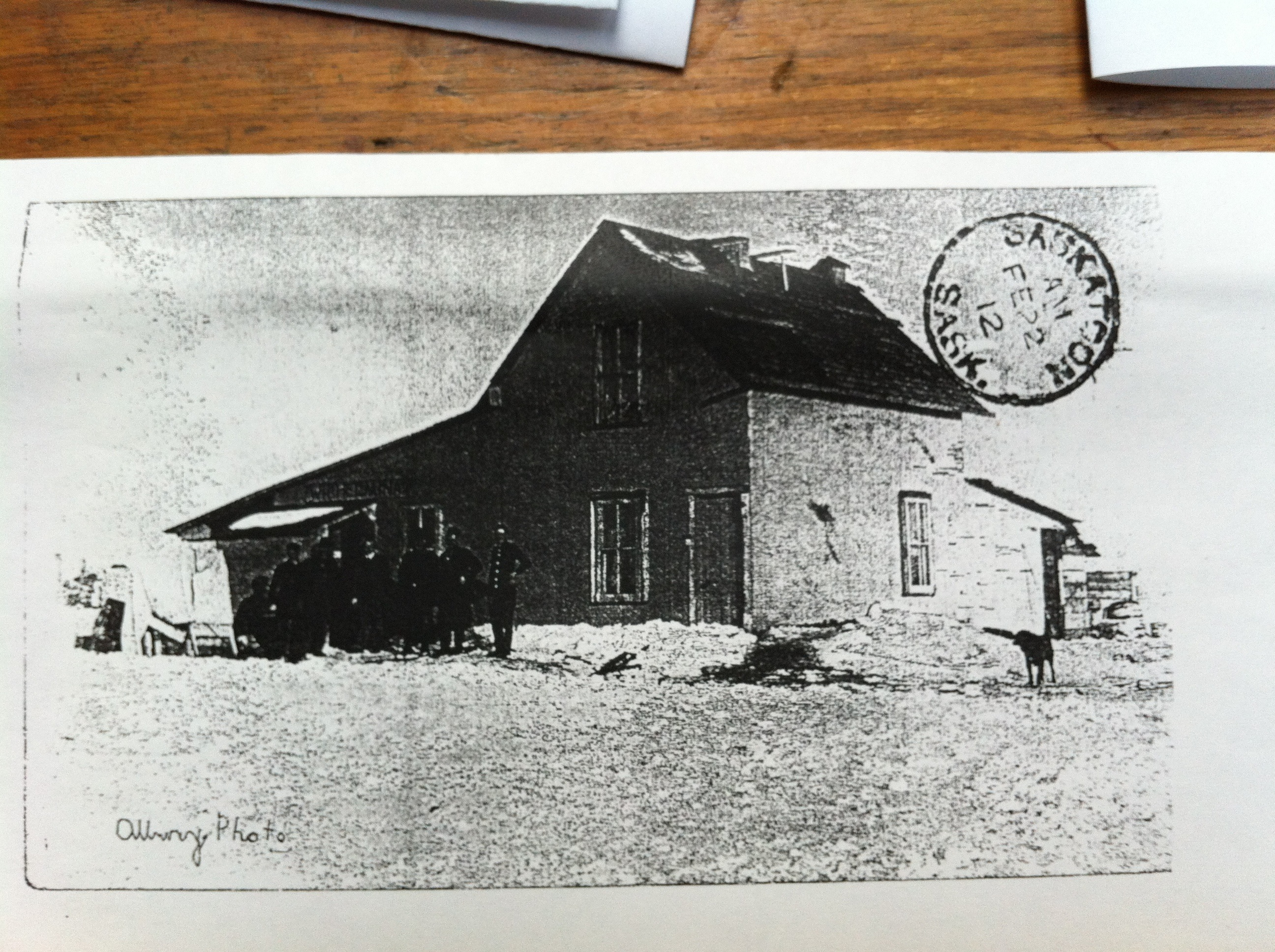
Earliest post office

Altario is a hamlet in east-central Alberta, Canada within Special Area No. 4. It is located on Highway 899 just north of Highway 12, approximately 12 kilometres (7.5 mi) east of Kirriemuir and 14 kilometres (8.7 mi) west of Compeer.

== History ==
In 1909 Porterfield Robinson arrived in the area and established the first post office where settlers believed the CPR Moose Jaw-Lacombe line would go. He built a store to bring in supplies for the settlers from the nearest railway point, Macklin, SK. A survey had been made, but it was still a question. Steel had been laid as far east as Stettler. Robinson named the settlement site "Wilhelmina" after his daughter and the post office was opened in February 1911. Settlers could walk half a day to get their mail if they had no horse or oxen. In August 1914, the steel came in from the west, four miles north of Robinson's site. The CPR moved a boxcar in, to serve as a station. But the first building in the new hamlet named Bideford (then Saskalta, then Altario) was the lean-to part of Porterfield Robinson's store, which he moved from Wilhelmena with the help of R. H. Bartels and his four Percheron horses. The town was renamed Bideford (the government said Wilhelmina was too difficult to spell), then Saskalta, and the name was subsequently changed again, to Altario. A crew of young Doukhobor men built the first grain elevator for United Grain Growers. "They were a jolly bunch of young men, and hard workers."

Robinson's Department Store was followed by John McLeod's Hardware store, the pool hall, the Chinese restaurant, the garage, and other places. Porterfield Robinson kept on being postmaster, and he also ran a farm machinery agency, and sold coal and oil. There was a livery stable run by Mr. Oxton, a pool hall, other farm machinery agencies, a notary public, doctor and a dentist.

In April 1920, the first Red Cross hospital was opened, with Dr. Dean Robinson as the doctor. He was later joined by his brother-in-law, Dr. W.W. Almond, husband of Wilhelmina Robinson. Dr. Leslie Robinson returned to Altario from McGill where he studied dentistry, and had his dental office in the annex of MacLeod's hardware.

The first teacher, Miss Milliken, arrived on May 7, 1916. Jack Ehaust built the first and only blacksmith shop in Altario.

Founded in 1919, the name came from the combination of Alberta and Ontario.

In the past Altario was a large and well populated community. It had more building in the past compared to today. Many of the old buildings included the Bideford School, a Canadian Pacific Railway station, livery stables, butcher shop, McLeod Hardware, Robinson Store, Beaver Lumber, Kreiser's Garage, Jensen's Store, the Alberta Hotel/Bar, Jake's Store, post office, lumber yard, hospital, the church and the Altario Hall. Most of these building are gone today, however a few are still standing. Those that still stand include the Kreiser's Garage, Jake's Store, the hall, the school, the Alberta Hotel/Bar, post office, and the church. Those still in use include the hall and the hotel/bar. Due to the school's original small size, it has been rebuilt and called the Altario School. The post office has also been relocated to a newer building.

With Altario being a large populated community, many things were always happening. Back in the day, Altario had many clubs/sport teams and organizations.

Clubs/sports included were the basketball, volleyball, baseball, hockey, disking, badminton and track and field. Organizations include Wheatsheaf Junior U.F.A, which is an agricultural improvement association that was organized in 1927. With the surrounding hamlets of Compeer and Kirriemuir, Altario is a part of KAC. KAC stands for Kirriemuir, Altario, and Compeer.

Altario School teaches students in grades K-12, with attendance ranging between 60 and 70 students in recent years, including some students from Compeer and Kirriemuir. The school has become Altario School, Agricultural Academy, School of Excellence https://altario.plrd.ab.ca/ and provides hands on farming experience for students grade 4 to 12. https://international.plrd.ab.ca/schools-of-excellence-programs/altario-agriculture-academy

Many families in and around Altario are dependent on the cattle industry and other forms of farming.

== Demographics ==
Altario recorded a population of 26 in the 1991 Census of Population conducted by Statistics Canada.

== See also ==
- List of communities in Alberta
- List of hamlets in Alberta
