= County of Paintearth No. 18 =

Municipal district in Alberta, Canada

Coordinates: 52°13′12″N 111°54′34″W

- Municipal district
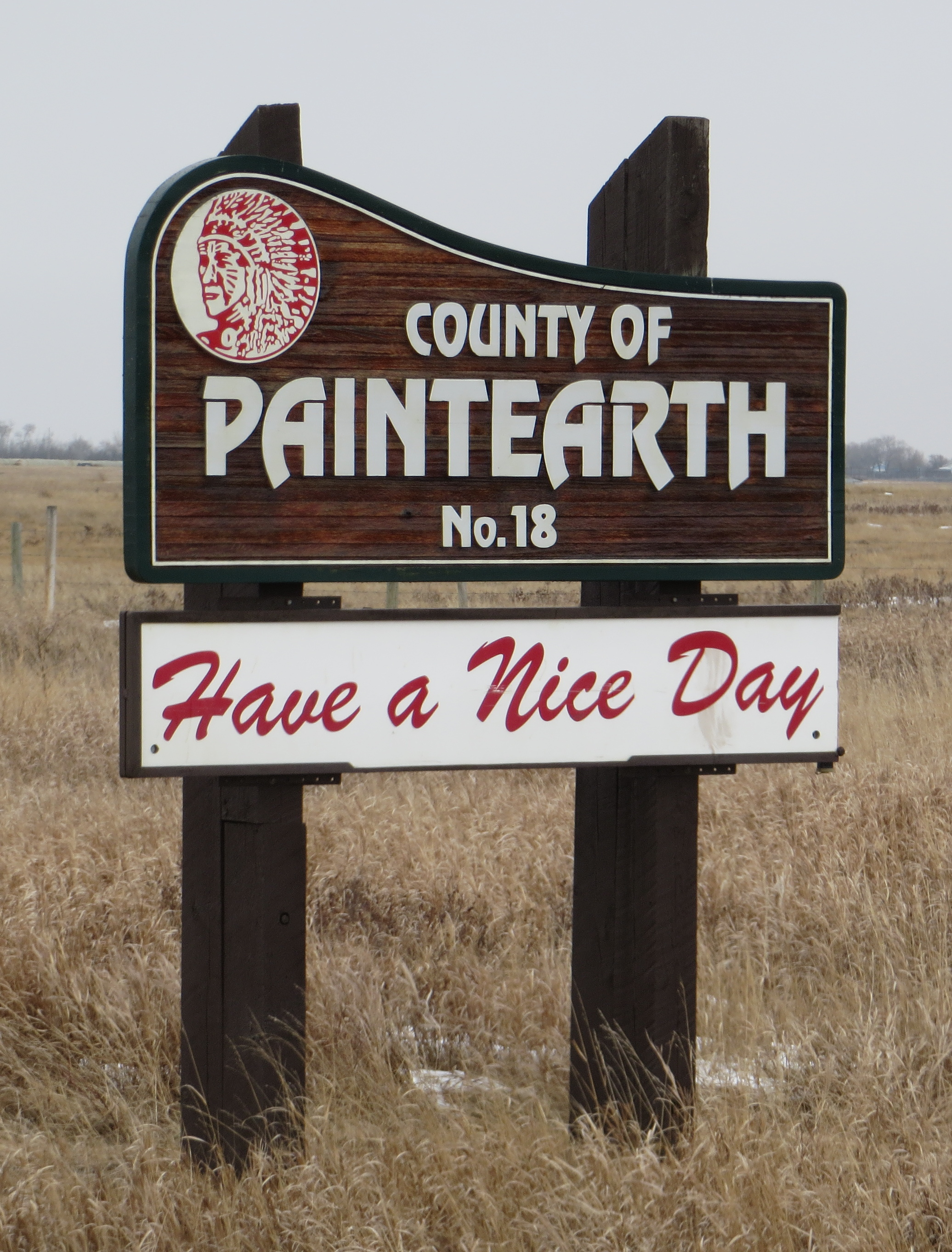
- Welcome sign

- Location within Alberta
- Country: Canada
- Province: Alberta
- Region: Central Alberta
- Planning region: Red Deer
- Established: 1944
- Incorporated: 1962

Government
  - Governing body: County of Paintearth Council
  - Administrative office: southeast of Castor

Area (2021)
  - Land: 3,239.58 km^{2} (1,250.81 sq mi)

Population (2021)
  - Total: 1,990
  - Density: 0.6/km^{2} (1.6/sq mi)
- Time zone: UTC−06:00 (Alberta Time)
- Website: countypaintearth.ca

The County of Paintearth No. 18 is a municipal district in east central Alberta, Canada, located in Census Division No. 7. Its municipal office is located southeast of the town of Castor near the intersection of Highway 12 and Highway 36.

== History ==
Originally incorporated in 1944 as the Municipal District of Paintearth No. 334, it was restructured as a county in 1962.

== Demographics ==
In the 2021 Census of Population conducted by Statistics Canada, the County of Paintearth No. 18 had a population of 1,990 living in 648 of its 720 total private dwellings, a change of −5.3% from its 2016 population of 2,102. With a land area of 3,239.58 km^{2} (1,250.81 sq mi), it had a population density of 0.6/km^{2} (1.6/sq mi) in 2021.

In the 2016 Census of Population conducted by Statistics Canada, the County of Paintearth No. 18 had a population of 2,102 living in 638 of its 696 total private dwellings, a 3.6% change from its 2011 population of 2,029. With a land area of 3,283.36 km^{2} (1,267.71 sq mi), it had a population density of 0.6/km^{2} (1.7/sq mi) in 2016.

== Communities and localities ==
The following urban municipalities are surrounded by the County of Paintearth No. 18.

Towns

- Castor
- Coronation

The following hamlets are within the County of Paintearth No. 18.

Hamlets

- Brownfield
- Federal
- Fleet
- Halkirk
- Throne

The following localities are within the County of Paintearth No. 18.

Localities

- Battle River
- Bulwark
- Cordel
- Hamilton Lake
- Lure
- Puffer
- Silver Heights
- Sullivan Lake
- Talbot
- Tinchebray
- Veldt

== See also ==
- List of communities in Alberta
- List of municipal districts in Alberta
