= Fen Osler Hampson =

Professor at Carleton University

Fen Osler Hampson is Chancellor's Professor and Professor of International Affairs at Carleton University and President of the World Refugee & Migration Council. He was a Visiting Fellow at The New Institute and a Distinguished Fellow and Director of Global Security Research at The Centre for International Governance Innovation. He was Co-Director of the Global Commission on Internet Governance. He was elected a Fellow of the Royal Society of Canada.

== Early life and education ==
Hampson earned a B.A. (Hon.) from the University of Toronto. He completed an MSc. (Econ.) degree (with distinction) from the London School of Economics and subsequently a Ph.D. and an A. M. degree from Harvard University (both with distinction).

== Career ==
After graduation, Hampson worked as a research fellow at the Belfer Center for Science & Technology at the John F. Kennedy School of Government, where he coordinated the project on Avoiding Nuclear War and Arms Control. In 1986 he became an assistant professor at the Norman Paterson School of International Affairs at Carleton University in Ottawa, Ontario, and later an associate professor and director of its Project in International Security.

Hampson's research and writing focuses on international and regional security and conflict management, preventative diplomacy, Canadian foreign policy, and the Middle East. His articles have appeared in the Washington Post, Foreign Affairs, the Globe and Mail, Foreign Policy Magazine, Policy Options, the National Post, the Ottawa Citizen, and elsewhere. He is a frequent commentator on the CBC, CTV, Sun Media, and Global TV news networks. He wrote columns for iPOLITICS on the topic of international affairs, and contributes to Diplomat and International Canada Magazine.

Hampson has served on the boards of directors of the Lester B. Pearson Peacekeeping Centre, the Social Sciences Foundation at the Joseph Korbel School of International Studies, and the Parliamentary Centre in Ottawa, Canada. He chaired the Human Security Track of the Helsinki Process on Globalization and Democracy and the Working Group on International Institutions and International Cooperation. He was Oversight Coordinator for the International Summit on Democracy, Terrorism, and Security.

From 2014 to 2016, Hampson served as the Global Commission on Internet Governance’s Co-Director, which educates and promotes global internet access while supporting the free flow of ideas and freedom of digital expression.

From 2012 to 2019, Hampson served as a Distinguished Fellow and the Director of Global Security for the Centre for International Governance Innovation, an internationally recognized think tank that focuses on international issues at the intersection of global governance and technology.

From 2022 to 2023, Hampson was a Visiting Fellow at The New Institute in Hamburg, Germany.

Currently, Hampson is the President of the World Refugee & Migration Council, an organization that engages in public policy advocacy, research, and project implementation to address the increasing global refugee crisis. He is also the Head of Secretariat and a member of the Steering Committee for the North and Central American Task Force on Migration, a joint initiative between academia, former policymakers, civil society, and business leaders to develop a regional strategy to address the Central American migration crisis.

== Academia ==
From 2000 to 2012, Hampson served as the Director of the Norman Paterson School of International Affairs. Currently, he is a Chancellor's Professor and Professor of International Affairs at the Norman Paterson School of International Affairs. Hampson’s courses focus on a variety of pertinent topics in international affairs, including internet governance, international negotiation, Canadian foreign policy, international organization, and conflict resolution and analysis.

== Publications ==
Hampson is the author or co-author of 15 books. He has edited 32 volumes and has written more than 100 journal articles and book chapters. His newest book, The Two Michaels: Innocent Canadian Captives and High Stakes Espionage in the US-China Cyber War, won the Ottawa Book Award for Non Fiction, was shortlisted for the 2022 Shaughnessy Cohen Prize for Political Writing, and was named to The Hill Times top 100 books of 2021.

Other recent publications include Braver Canada: Shaping Our Own Destiny in a Precarious World, written with Derek Burney, and Master of Persuasion: The Global Legacy of Brian Mulroney.

Hampson's publications have been finalists for both the Grawmeyer Prize for the best book on World Order in 2017, as well as the Donner Book Price for the best book in Public Policy in 2015.

== Recognition ==
Hampson received a Research & Writing Award from the John D. and Catherine T. MacArthur Foundation. He also received a Jennings Randolph Senior Fellowship from the United States Institute of Peace.

In 2022, Dr. Hampson received the ISA-Canada Distinguished Scholar Award from the International Studies Association (ISA), for his scholarship contributions and accomplishments pertaining to the study and development of international relations in Canada. He also received the ISA’s Peace Distinguished Scholar Award in 2018.

== Books (authored & co-authored) ==
- The Two Michaels: Innocent Canadian Captives, High Stakes Espionage, and the US-China Cyber War. With Mike Blanchfield. (Toronto: Sutherland Press, 2021). 282 pp.
- Braver Canada. With Derek Burney. (Montreal and Kingston: McGill-Queen's University Press, 2020). 251 pp.
- Master of Persuasion: The Global Legacy of Brian Mulroney. Foreword by James Baker, III, former US Secretary of State and Secretary of the US Treasury. Toronto: Penguin/Random House. 2018. 288 pp.
- International Negotiation and the Mediation of Violent Conflict. With Chester A. Crocker and Pamela Aall. London: Routledge. 2018. 209 pp.
- Look Who’s Watching: Surveillance, Treachery and Trust Online. With Eric Jardine. Waterloo & London: Centre for Global Governance Innovation, 2016. 340 pp.
- Brave New Canada. With Derek Burney. (Montreal and Kingston: McGill-Queen's University Press, 2014).
- The Global Power of Talk: Negotiating America’s Interests. With I. William Zartman. (Boulder and London: Paradigm Books, 2012). 224 pp.
- Canada’s International Policies: Agendas, Alternatives, Politics. With Brian W. Tomlin and Norman Hillmer. (Toronto: Oxford University Press, 2008). 432 pp.
- Taming Intractable Conflicts: Mediation in the Hardest Cases. With Chester A. Crocker and Pamela Aall. (Washington, D.C.: United States Institute of Peace Press, 2004). 240 pp.
- Madness in the Multitude: Human Security and World Disorder. With contributions by John Hay, Jean Daudelin, Holly Reid, and Todd Martin. (Toronto, New York, and Oxford: Oxford University Press, 2002). 210 pp.
- Herding Cats: Multiparty Mediation in a Complex World. With Chester A. Crocker and Pamela R. Aall. (Washington, D.C.: United States Institute of Peace Press, November 1999). 756 pp.
- Nurturing Peace: Why Peace Settlements Succeed or Fail. (Washington, D.C.: United States Institute of Peace Press, 1996). 278 pp.
- Multilateral Negotiations: Lessons From Arms Control, Trade, and the Environment. With a contribution by Michael Hart. (Baltimore and London: The Johns Hopkins University Press, 1995 and 1999) 421 pp.
- Unguided Missiles: How America Buys its Weapons. (New York: W.W. Norton & Company, 1989). 370 pp.
- Forming Economic Policy: The Case of Energy in Canada and Mexico. (New York: St. Martin's Press, 1986). 161 pp.

== Edited volumes ==
- The Indo-Pacific: New Strategies for Canadian Engagement with a Critical Region. Co-edited with Goldy Hyder and Tina Park. Toronto: Sutherland House Books, 2022. Pp. 226.
- International Negotiation and Political Narratives: A Comparative Study. Co-edited with Amrita Narilkar. (London: Routledge, 2022). 295pp.
- Diplomacy and the Future of World Order. Co-authored and co-edited with Chester A. Crocker and Pamela Aall. (Washington, D.C.: Georgetown University Press, 2021). 361 pp.
- Routledge Handbook of Peace, Security and Development. Co-edited with Alp Ozerdem and Jonathan Kent. (London: Routledge, 2020). 466 pp.
- Tug of War: Negotiating Security in Eurasia. Co-edited with Mikhail Troitskiy. (Waterloo: Centre for International Governance Innovation for the Processes of International Negotiation Project of the Dutch Royal Institute of International Affairs (Clingendael). 2018). 224 pp.
- Elusive Pursuits: Lessons from Canada’s Interventions Abroad: Canada Among Nations, 2015. Co-edited with Stephen Saideman. (Waterloo: Centre for International Governance Innovation. 2015). 243 pp.
- Managing Conflict in a World Adrift. Co-edited with Chester A. Crocker and Pamela Aall. Washington, D.C.: United States Institute of Peace, 2014. 629 pp.
- Rewiring Regional Security in a Fragmented World. Co-authored and co-edited with Chester A. Crocker and Pamela Aall. (Washington, D.C.: United States Institute of Peace Press, 2011). 587 pp.
- As Others See Us: Canada Among Nations 2010. Co-edited with Paul Heinbecker. (McGill-Queen's University Press). 388 pp.
- Leashing the Dogs of War: Conflict Management in a Divided World. Co-edited with Chester A. Crocker and Pamela Aall. (Washington, D.C.: United States Institute of Peace Press, 2007). 726 pp.
- Grasping the Nettle: Analyzing Cases of Intractable Conflict. Co-edited with Chester A. Crocker and Pamela Aall. (Washington, D.C.: United States Institute of Peace Press). 406 pp.
- Setting Priorities Straight: Canada Among Nations 2004. Co-edited with David Carment and Norman Hillmer. (Montreal and Kingston: McGill-Queen's University Press, 2004). 291pp.
- Coping with the American Colossus: Canada Among Nations, 2003. Co-edited with David Carment and Norman Hillmer. (Toronto, New York, and Oxford: Oxford University Press. 2003). 354 pp.
- From Reaction to Conflict Prevention: Opportunities for the UN System in the New Millennium. Co-edited with David Malone. (Boulder, Colo.: Lynne Rienner and the International Peace Academy, 2002). 411 pp.
- Turbulent Peace: The Challenges of Managing International Conflict. Co-edited with Chester A. Crocker and Pamela R. Aall. (Washington, D.C.: United States Institute of Peace Press, 2001). 894 pp.
- The Axworthy Legacy: Canada Among Nations 2001. Co-edited with Maureen Appel Molot and Norman Hillmer. (Toronto, New York, and Oxford: Oxford University Press, 2001). 317 pp.
- Vanishing Borders: Canada Among Nations 2000. Co-edited with Maureen Appel Molot. (Toronto, New York, and Oxford: Oxford University Press, 2000). 341 pp.
- A Big League Player? Canada Among Nations 1999. Co-edited with Michael Hart and Martin Rudner. (Toronto, New York, and Oxford: Oxford University Press, 1999). 273 pp.
- Leadership and Dialogue: Canada Among Nations 1998. Co-edited with Maureen Appel Molot. (Toronto, New York, and Oxford: Oxford University Press, 1998). 304 pp.
- Asia Pacific Face Off: Canada Among Nations 1996. Co-edited with Maureen Appel Molot and Martin Rudner. (Ottawa: Carleton University Press/McGill-Queen's University Press, 1996). 352 pp.
- Managing Global Chaos: Sources of and Responses to International Conflict. Co-edited with Chester A. Crocker and Pamela R. Aall. (Washington, D.C.: United States Institute of Peace Press, 1996). 642 pp.
- Earthly Goods: Environmental Change and Social Justice. Co-edited with Judith Reppy. (Ithaca: Cornell University Press, 1996). 263 pp.
- Big Enough to be Heard. Canada Among Nations 1995-96. Co-edited with Maureen Appel Molot. (Ottawa: Carleton University Press/McGill-Queen's University Press, 1995). 323 pp.
- Global Jeopardy. Canada Among Nations 1993-94. Co-edited with Christopher J. Maule. (Ottawa: Carleton University Press/McGill-Queen's University Press, 1993). 319 pp.
- A New World Order? Canada Among Nations 1992-93. Co-edited with Christopher J. Maule. (Ottawa: Carleton University Press/McGill-Queen's University Press, 1992). 301 pp.
- After the Cold War. Canada Among Nations 1990-91. Co-edited with Christopher J. Maule. (Ottawa: Carleton University Press/McGill-Queen's University Press, 1991). 280 pp.
- The Arctic Environment and Canada's International Relations. Co-authored with members of the Working Group of the National Capital Branch of the Canadian Institute of International Affairs. (Ottawa: Canadian Arctic Resources Committee, 1991). 110 pp.
- The Allies and Arms Control. Co-edited with Harald von Riekhoff and John Roper. (Baltimore and London: The Johns Hopkins University Press, 1992). 375 pp.
- The Challenge of Change: Canada Among Nations 1989-90. Co-edited with Maureen Appel Molot. (Ottawa: Carleton University Press/McGill-Queen's University Press, 1990). 243 pp.
- Managing Regional Conflict. Co-edited with Brian S. Mandell. Special issue of International Journal. Vol. 45, No. 2 (Spring 1990). 307 pp.
- Securing Europe's Future: Changing Elements of European Security. Co-edited with Stephen Flanagan. (Boston: Auburn House and London: Croom Helm, 1986). 334 pp.
- Canada and Mexico: The Comparative and Joint Politics of Energy: Report of a Symposium at Harvard University's Center for International Affairs. Co-edited with Elliot J. Feldman, W. Douglas Costain, and Lauren McKinsey. (Cambridge, Mass.: University Consortium for Research on North America and Harvard University Center for International Affairs, 1981). 76 pp.
