= Kirriemuir, Alberta =

Kirriemuir
- Hamlet
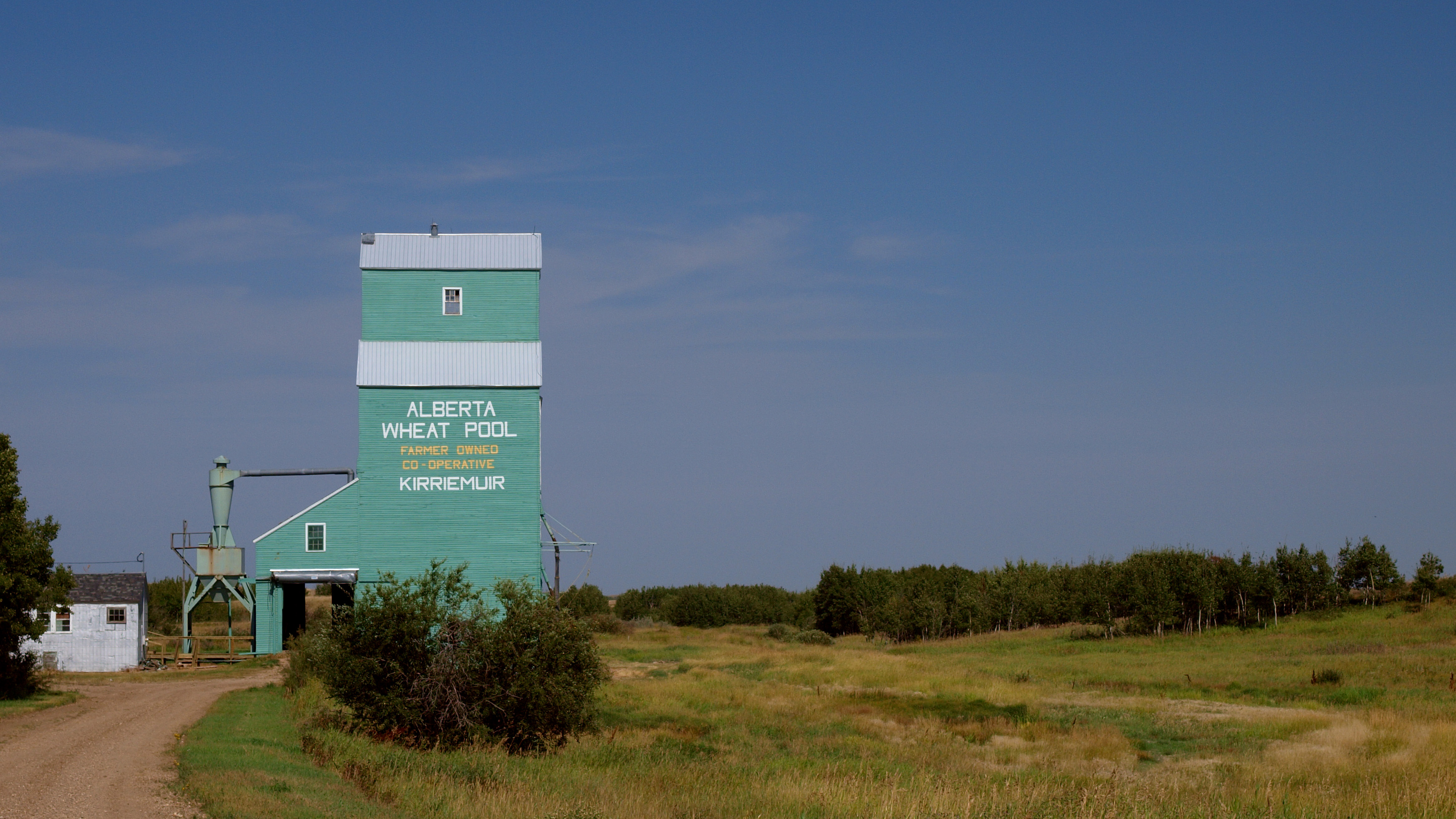

- Location of Kirriemuir Kirriemuir (Canada)
- Coordinates: 51°55′22″N 110°18′44″W
- Country: Canada
- Province: Alberta
- Region: Central Alberta
- Census division: 4
- Special area: Special Area No. 4

Government
  - Type: Unincorporated
  - Governing body: Special Areas Board

Population (1991)
  - Total: 28
- Time zone: UTC−06:00 (Alberta Time)
- Area codes: 403, 587, 825

Kirriemuir is hamlet in east-central Alberta, Canada within Special Area No. 4. It is located on Highway 12, approximately 12 kilometres (7.5 mi) west of Altario. It has an elevation of 730 metres (2,400 ft).

Kirriemuir has a hall, a small general store with a post office and gas station, a playground, and two ball diamonds. The hamlet draws children from the greater area to participate in its softball teams during the summer months. One of the more popular events each year is the annual discing bonspiel, which is held at the Kirriemuir Hall. An older Alberta Wheat Pool grain elevator remains standing at the edge of the community and it is still in use, but by private owners as the railroad tracks have long since been removed.

The hamlet was named after Kirriemuir in Scotland.

== Demographics ==
Kirriemuir recorded a population of 28 in the 1991 Census of Population conducted by Statistics Canada.

== See also ==
- List of communities in Alberta
- List of hamlets in Alberta
