= Political management =

Political management is a broad and ever evolving field encompassing a number of activities in professional politics. The field includes campaign management and consulting, advertisement creation/purchasing, grassroots politics, opposition research, issue advocacy, lobbying, fundraising, and polling. Some consider political management to be an applied form of political science.

== History ==
Political managers first emerged during the early 20th century as American politics drifted away from party-centered politics towards an atmosphere focusing more on the individual candidates. Candidates began to hire their own staff to manage strategic decisions, fundraise, and handle the day-to-day campaign activities. Initially corporate public relations firms were hired to manage campaigns. However, eventually public relations firms specializing in political campaigns began to surface during the 1950s and 60s. One of the first professionals to be labeled a “political consultant” was Joseph Napolitan who went on to found the American Association for Political Consultants. Eventually consultants specializing in specific aspects of the campaign began to grow in popularity, like, Tony Schwartz, the creator of the now infamous "Daisy" ad, and one of the first media consultants to specialize in political campaigns. After media, polling was one of the first services sought out by campaign managers, followed by direct mail. Today, political managers specialize in a wide range of consulting areas including strategy, polling, direct mail, fundraising, web design, lobbying, and get out the vote efforts.

== Educational opportunities ==
Several universities offer graduate degrees in political management and applied politics. Some well known degree programs include the Graduate School of Political Management at The George Washington University, the Campaign Management Institute at American University, the Bliss Institute of Applied Politics at the University of Akron, and the Political Campaigning Program at the University of Florida. Currently, only The George Washington University offers an online Master's degree in Political Management.

A Canadian Masters of Political Management (MPM) program was also recently started at Carleton University; as of July 2012, it is the only degree of its type focusing on Canadian politics.
