= Arthur Kroeger College of Public Affairs =

- Carleton University
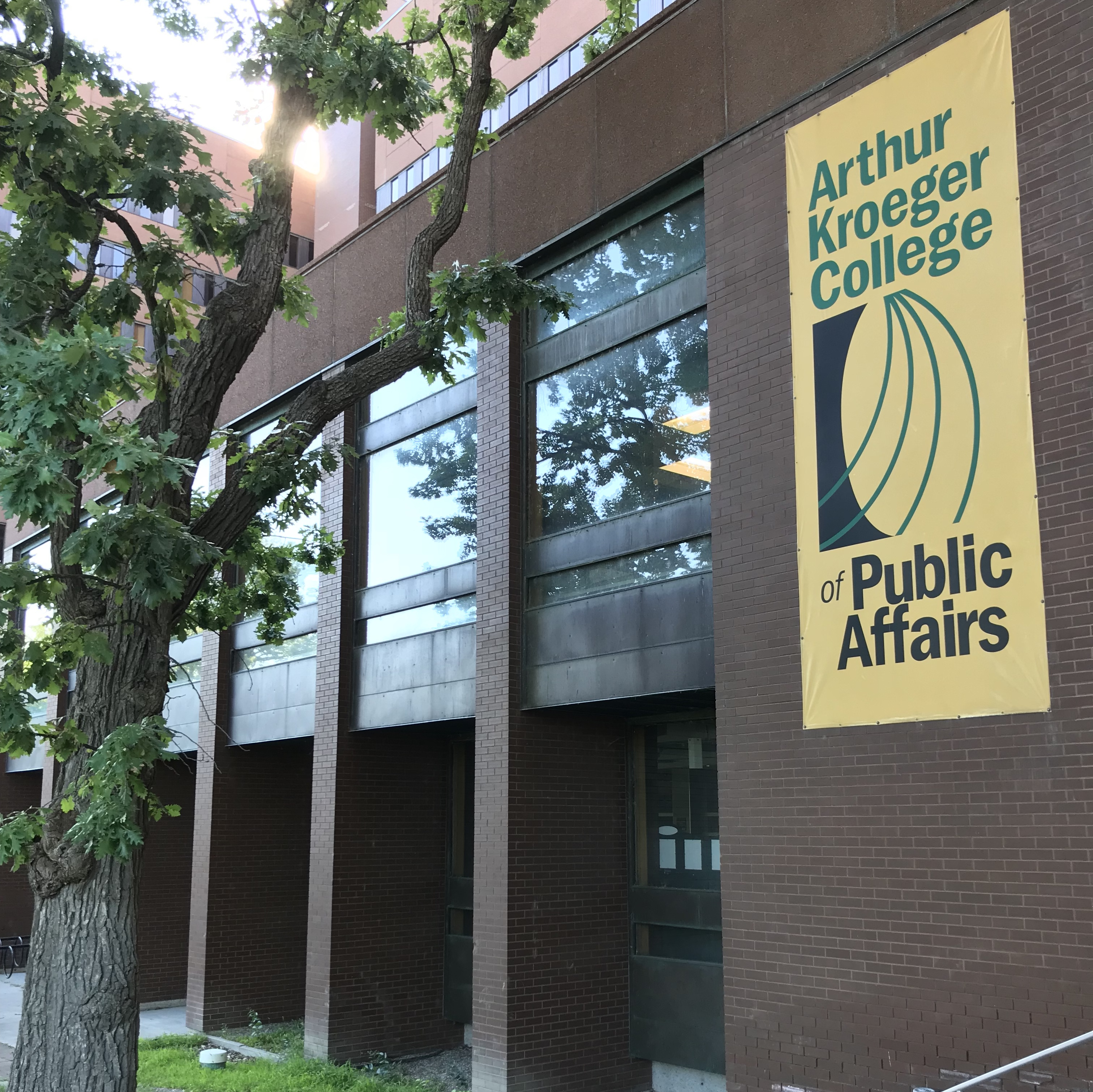
- Exterior view of the entrance to Arthur Kroeger College in the Loeb Building, 2018.
- Location: Ottawa, Ontario, Canada
- Abbreviation: AKC
- Established: 1999
- Named for: Arthur Kroeger
- Colours: Forest green & gold
- Director: Evelyn Maeder
- Undergraduates: 1,072
- Postgraduates: 111
- Website: carleton.ca/akcollege
- Student association: papmss.com

The Arthur Kroeger College of Public Affairs, colloquially known as Arthur Kroeger College or AKC, is a specialized institute within the Faculty of Public Affairs at Carleton University in Ottawa, Ontario. The College offers undergraduate and graduate programs in the fields of public policy, international studies, and political management. These include the Bachelor of Public Affairs and Policy Management (BPAPM), the Bachelor of Global and International Studies (BGInS), the Master of Political Management (MPM), and the MA in Migration and Diaspora Studies (MDS).

The College was established in 1999 and is named for the late Arthur Kroeger, a senior Canadian public servant and former Chancellor of Carleton University.

== History ==
Prior to the formation of the Arthur Kroeger College of Public Affairs, Carleton University had an established reputation for studies in public policy and administration. As the Canadian government became increasingly focused on reintegrating veterans into civilian life toward the end of World War II, a need arose to meet the needs of an expanding federal public service. The university, then called Carleton College, introduced a Bachelor of Public Administration (B.P.A.) degree under the Institute of Public Administration in 1944, becoming the first category of undergraduate degree issued by the university. Initial coursework covered a broad spectrum of disciplines, including public finance, statistics, political science, and organizational management.

In 1999, Carleton created the new Bachelor of Public Affairs and Policy Management (B.P.A.P.M.) The degree was housed in the new Arthur Kroeger College of Public Affairs. The program was conceived to prepare students for leadership roles at the nexus of the private, public, and non-profit sectors, providing students with strong foundations in the theory and application of public policy, with the College serving as its intellectual home. A fundraising steering committee, led by prominent Toronto businessman George Anderson, embarked on an ambitious campaign to raise $1.5 million to support the College’s activities, including an endowment fund, visiting fellowships, and leadership conferences to enhance student experience

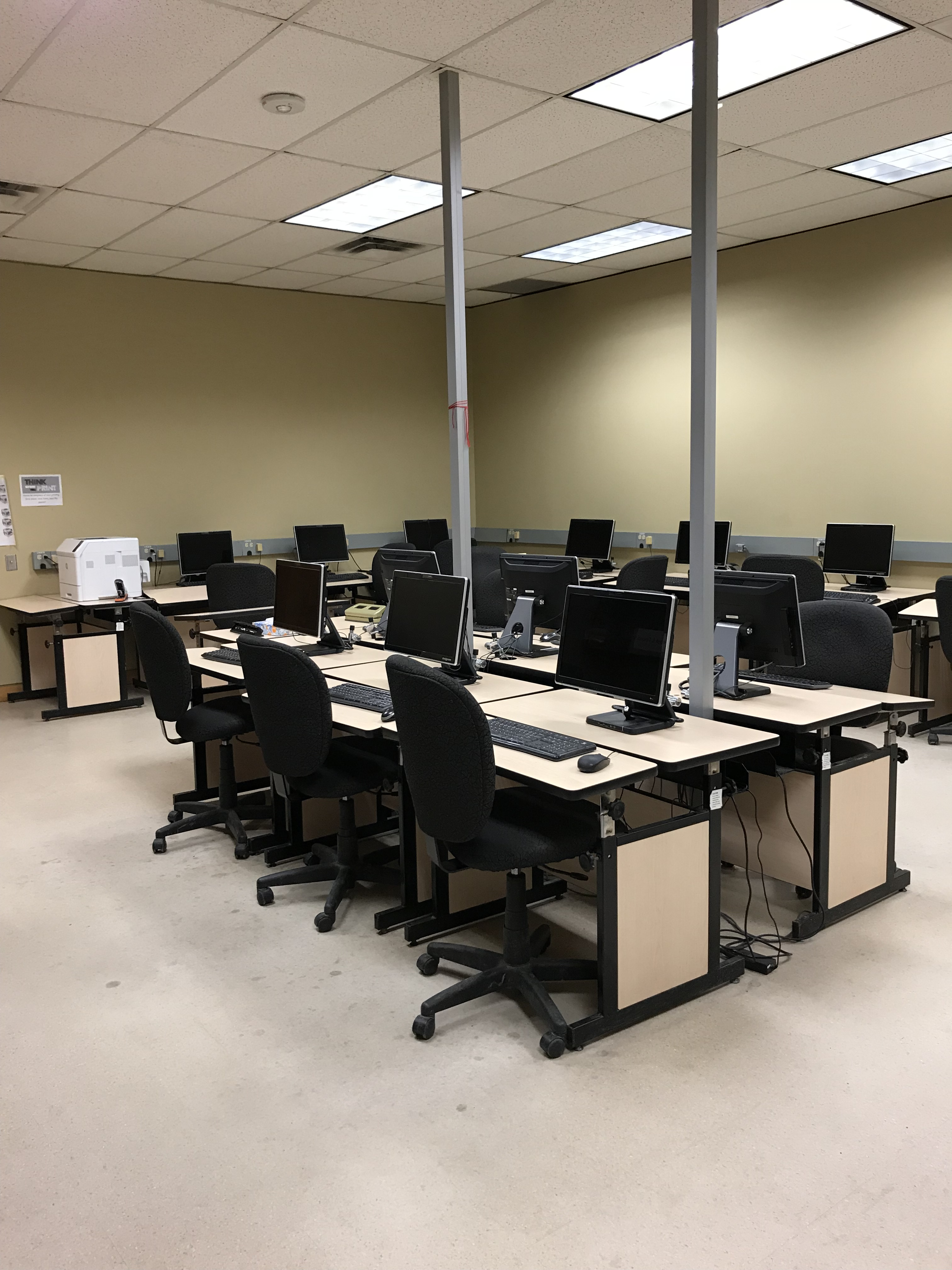
Computer lab at the Arthur Kroeger College of Public Affairs, 2018

The College's namesake, Arthur Kroeger, was a reputed public servant who held a number of senior positions within the Canadian public service prior to his appointment as Chancellor of Carleton University in 1993. The College formally opened on October 2, 1999 with a reception attended by then-leading figures in Canadian public affairs, including former NDP leader Ed Broadbent, journalist Trina McQueen, and former Clerk of the Privy Council Gordon Robertson. During its first year, the B.P.A.P.M. program received nearly two hundred applications for its first class, with 67 students admitted to the program that year The program produced its first cohort of graduates in 2003.

From 1999 to 2011, the Bachelor of Public Affairs and Policy Management was the sole program housed in the Arthur Kroeger College of Public Affairs, until a $15 million donation from petroleum magnate Clayton Riddell helped establish a Master in Political Management program, a graduate degree focusing on strategic planning, communications, government relations and public opinion research related to managing political offices and campaigns.

In 2015, the College received an additional interdisciplinary undergraduate program, the Bachelor of Global and International Studies (BGInS) program, focusing predominantly on academic disciplines related to international affairs, ranging from political science, economics, law, anthropology, and sociology.

In 2019, the College also added the Migration and Diaspora Studies (MDS) interdisciplinary graduate programs. MDS combines academic inquiry into social, cultural, political, and economic aspects of the movement of people. Migration and Diaspora Studies offers a Master of Arts degree and a graduate diploma program.

== College ==
Since its inception in 1999, Arthur Kroeger College has had a dedicated space on the first floor of the Loeb Building housing the College's administrative offices and other student spaces. The College is used largely by students in the Bachelor of Public Affairs and Policy Management and Master of Political Management program. The College contains a reception area for visitors, as well as the private offices of the Director and other administrative staff. Copies of leading news magazines, periodicals, and academic journals are available for students to peruse in this area. The College contains a computer lab reserved for use by students in the Public Affairs and Policy Management program, containing several computer stations and a complimentary printer. The computer lab is accessible through a secured exterior door outside of business hours. The College is also home to the Donald J. Carty Boardroom, which hosts meetings of the College administration and seminars for Public Affairs and Policy Management courses.

== Leadership ==
- College Director
  - Eileen Saunders (1999–2007)
  - Christopher Dornan (2007–2013)
  - J. Barry Wright (2013–2018)
  - Mary Francoli (2018–present)
- Program Director, Bachelor of Global & International Studies
  - Chris Brown (2015–2018)
  - Neil Gerlach (2018–present)
- Program Director, Bachelor of Public Affairs & Policy Management
  - Lisa Mills (2018–present)
- Program Director, Master of Political Management
  - Stephen Azzi (2012–2024)
  - André Turcotte (2024-present)
- Program Director, Migration and Diaspora Studies
  - James Casteel (2019–present)

== Undergraduate programs ==
=== Bachelor of Public Affairs and Policy Management ===
The Bachelor of Public Affairs and Policy Management (BPAPM) is a competitive, specialized four-year Honours degree that focuses on studying public policy and public administration through an interdisciplinary framework. For much of the College's existence, the BPAPM has been its flagship program. Compared to similar programs at Carleton, the program has higher admission requirements and limited enrollment, with typical first year cohorts not exceeding 120 students.

==== Academics ====
Students completing a Bachelor of Public Affairs and Policy Management are required to complete core courses throughout their undergraduate career. Course content covers topics such as political and economic theory, public policy analysis, program evaluation, research methods, and organizational theory. Depending on a student’s specialization, other coursework encompasses fields such as law, political science, business, economics, sociology, and political science. Students must complete courses in French language reflecting an intermediate proficiency in the language by their graduation.

In their fourth year, students must complete a semester-long (0.5 credit) Capstone Seminar, in addition to an Honours Research Essay (HRE) in order to graduate. Students typically conduct research in a field related to their specialization to complete their HRE.

=== Areas of specialization ===
==== Former specializations ====
Prior to September 2016, the Public Affairs and Policy Management offered seven specializations to students:. Students admitted prior to the 2016-17 academic year retain these specializations throughout their courses and during graduation.

- Communication and Information Technology Policy
- Development Studies
- Human Rights
- International Studies
- Public Policy and Administration
- Social Policy
- Strategic Public Opinion & Policy Analysis

==== Current specializations ====
Beginning in the 2016-17 academic year, upon entering their second year, students in the Public Affairs and Policy Management program are required to choose a specialization, in addition to a narrower Policy Stream within their specified field of study. This change was prompted by a growing desire among students for a more personalized learning experience better suited toward their career needs and research interests within the program.

- Communication and Policy Studies
  - Communication Technologies Regulation
  - Strategic Public Opinion
- Development Policy Studies
  - Rights and Human Development
  - Global Economic Relations
- International Policy Studies
  - International Relations & Conflict
  - Security and Intelligence
- Public Policy & Administration
  - Economic Policy
  - Social Policy
  - Environmental & Sustainable Energy Policy

==== Experiential learning ====
Students can complete a co-op designation as a part of their degree. This offers students the ability to gain valuable experience working directly in public policy and administration. Carleton's location in Ottawa ideal for allowing students to access opportunities within the Government of Canada, non-profit organizations, research firms, and consulting groups. Many students, following the completion of their summer terms, are occasionally retained for part-time work during study terms. To graduate with co-op designation, it requires three four-month work terms, with the option for a fourth term. With the work-study schedule for B.PAPM, graduating with the co-op designation can take an additional 1-3 semesters to complete the program, dependent on course requirements and the number of work terms.

==== Student experience and alumni ====
The Bachelor of Public Affairs and Policy Management is consistently regarded as one of Carleton's top undergraduate programs, alongside Journalism, Architecture, Global and International Studies, and International Business. Students in the program continue to be recognized for their academic merit. Since 2012, six PAPM students have been awarded the prestigious Killam Undergraduate Fellowship by Fulbright Canada for academic exchange in the United States.

PAPM students are represented by a student government, the Public Affairs and Policy Management Students' Society (PAPMSS) (previously named the Arthur Kroeger College Educational Students’ Society (AKCESS)). Established in 2003, it is composed of a President, six Vice Presidents, and Year Representatives for the freshman and sophomore cohorts. The organization hosts social events, networking opportunities, and other initiatives to promote community within the program.

The Bachelor of Public Affairs and Policy Management has produced many successful alumni in the fields of law, public administration, and politics, including two sitting Members of Parliament.

=== Bachelor of Global and International Studies ===
The Bachelor of Global and International Studies (BGInS) is a specialized, interdisciplinary four-year program, offering both general and honours degree options. The program was conceptualized and developed by former Program Director Chris Brown. On top of selecting one of 17 different streams, students are required to complete a variety of core courses in global history and ethnography to gain a nuanced understanding of global and international processes from a multidisciplinary perspective. The BGInS degree also has a mandatory second-language requirement

==== Academics ====
Although a relatively new degree program offered through the College, having received its first cohort of students in the 2015-16 academic year, the program has attracted high rates of applications. In its inaugural year, the program saw 505 applications. Along with the core faculty the degree is taught by over 120 affiliated faculty members from 19 different academic units across the university (such as law, politics, and history) to provide larger breadth of knowledge for students to draw upon, and they often also supervise Honours Research Essays that students complete in their fourth year of study.

==== International Experience Requirement ====
Students completing an honours Bachelor of Global and International Studies must complete an International Experience Requirement. This component of the degree offers students immersive learning in diverse global settings, exposing them to cross-cultural perspectives across different academic disciplines. Students have access to dedicated staff to assist them with identifying and applying for international opportunities relevant to their field of study. Students are able to choose one of six pathways to complete this requirement:

- International Exchange
- Carleton Course Taught Abroad
- Global and International Group Project
- Experiential Learning Abroad
- Letter of Permission
- International Placement

=== Areas of specialization ===
The BGInS degree is multidisciplinary, composed of 18 specializations (called 'streams' in the general degree) that range from regional to thematic. They are listed below:

==== Thematic specializations and streams ====
- French and Francophone Studies
- Global and Transnational History
- Global Development
- Global Genders and Sexualities
- Global Inequalities and Social Change
- Global Law and Social Justice
- Global Literatures
- Global Media and Communication
- Global Politics
- Global Religions: Identity and Community
- Globalization and the Environment
- Globalization, Culture, Power
- International Economic Policy
- Migration and Diaspora Studies
- Teaching English in Global Contexts

==== Regional specializations and streams ====
- Africa and Globalization
- Europe and Russia in the World
- Latin American and Caribbean Studies

== Graduate programs ==
=== Master of Political Management ===
The Clayton H. Riddell Graduate Program in Political Management, otherwise known as the Master of Political Management (MPM) program, is a one-year graduate program focusing on political management, preparing students for leadership roles in campaigns, political parties, political offices, and non-governmental organizations. The program is the first of its kind to be offered in Canada. Students receive experiential learning through a ten-week practicum in political offices, consulting firms, and non-governmental organizations within the National Capital Region. The program offers several core courses in Institutions and Governance, Strategic Communications, and Political Management. Other courses include communications, management, and political marketing.

The program was made possible by a $15 million donation from Clayton Riddell, after whom the program is named. The implications of this donation was later criticized for allowing donor influence over the budget, hiring, and curriculum. The agreement was later rewritten to clarify that the five-person steering committee does not have the power to "approve" hiring and curriculum decisions and instead only provides advice.

=== MA in Migration and Diaspora Studies ===
The MA in Migration and Diaspora Studies is a two-year graduate program in migration studies, examining the social, political, economic, and cultural dimensions of international migration and diaspora communities globally. The program allows studies to complete the program through coursework, a research essay, or thesis.

== Notable alumni and faculty ==
=== Alumni ===
==== Bachelor of Public Affairs & Policy Management ====
- David Coletto, CEO of Abacus Data
- Joe Cressy, Toronto City Councillor for Ward 10 (2014–present)
- Garnett Genuis, MP for Sherwood Park—Fort Saskatchewan (2015–present)
- Matthew Luloff, Ottawa City Councillor for Orléans (2018–present)
- John Nater, MP for Perth Wellington (2015–present)
- Trevin Stratton, Americas Economics Leader, Deloitte (2021-present), Chief Economist, Canadian Chamber of Commerce (2018-2021)
- Cameron Wales, Brockville City Councillor at-large (2018–present)

== See also ==
- School of Public Policy and Administration
- Norman Paterson School of International Affairs
