= Special Area No. 4 =

Special area in Alberta, Canada

- Special area

- Location within Alberta
- Country: Canada
- Province: Alberta
- Planning region: Red Deer
- Incorporated: January 1, 1969

Government
  - Governing body: Special Areas Board
  - Municipal office: Hanna
  - District office: Consort

Area (2021)
  - Land: 4,299.8 km^{2} (1,660.2 sq mi)

Population (2021)
  - Total: 1,236
  - Density: 0.3/km^{2} (0.78/sq mi)
- Time zone: UTC−06:00 (Alberta Time)
- Postal Code Prefix: T0C
- Area code: +1-403
- Website: specialareas.ab.ca

Special Area No. 4 is a special area in central Alberta, Canada. It is a rural municipality similar to a municipal district; however, the elected council is overseen by four representatives appointed by the province, the Special Areas Board.

Special Area 4 has one provincial park, Gooseberry Lake Provincial Park. Lakes include Grassy Island Lake and Sounding Lake.

== Geography ==
=== Communities and localities ===
The following urban municipalities are surrounded by Special Area No. 4.

Cities

- none

Towns

- none

Villages

- Consort
- Veteran

Summer villages

- none

The following hamlets are located within Special Area No. 4.

Hamlets

- Altario
- Compeer
- Hemaruka
- Kirriemuir
- Loyalist
- Monitor

The following localities are located within Special Area No. 4.

Localities

- Ensleigh
- Idamay
- Little Gem
- Lloyds Hill

- Neutral Valley
- Pemukan
- Sounding Lake
- Wiste

== Demographics ==
In the 2021 Census of Population conducted by Statistics Canada, Special Area No. 4 had a population of 1,236 living in 421 of its 489 total private dwellings, a change of −0.1% from its 2016 population of 1,237. With a land area of 4,299.8 km^{2} (1,660.2 sq mi), it had a population density of 0.3/km^{2} (0.7/sq mi) in 2021.

In the 2016 Census of Population conducted by Statistics Canada, Special Area No. 4 had a population of 1,237 living in 429 of its 471 total private dwellings, a change of −8.5% from its 2011 population of 1,352. With a land area of 4,402.64 km^{2} (1,699.87 sq mi), it had a population density of 0.3/km^{2} (0.7/sq mi) in 2016.

== See also ==
- List of communities in Alberta
- List of improvement districts in Alberta
- List of municipal districts in Alberta
- List of municipalities in Alberta
