= Throne, Alberta =

Throne
- Hamlet
- Location of Throne in County of Paintearth No. 18 Throne (Alberta)
- Coordinates: 52.0489°N 111.2872°W
- Country: Canada
- Province: Alberta
- Region: Central Alberta
- Census division: No. 7
- Municipal District: County of Paintearth No. 18

Government
  - Type: Unincorporated
  - Governing body: County of Paintearth Council
- Time zone: UTC−06:00 (Alberta Time)
- Highways: Highway 12

Throne is a hamlet in central Alberta, Canada that is under the jurisdiction of the County of Paintearth No. 18. It is on Highway 12, approximately 150 kilometres (93 mi) southeast of Camrose and 12 kilometres (7.5 mi) southeast of Coronation.

== See also ==
- List of hamlets in Alberta
