= Hard Passage =

2007 book by Arthur Kroeger

Hard Passage: A Mennonite Family's Long Journey from Russia to Canada
- Author: Arthur Kroeger
- Language: English
- Subject: Biography, History
- Published: 2007 (University of Alberta Press)
- Publication place: Canada
- Media type: Print (Paperback)
- Pages: 400
- ISBN: 9780888644732
- OCLC: 238850148

Hard Passage: A Mennonite Family's Long Journey from Russia to Canada is a 2007 book by Arthur Kroeger about his family's experiences in Russia (Ukraine), the Soviet Union, and their journey to Canada (Alberta).

== Reception ==
Canadian Ethnic Studies wrote "Kroeger is a good storyteller, and although the book will primarily be enjoyed by his Mennonite counterparts, it is also a very readable account of early settler life in Western Canada." and concluded " The book very ably tells the story of one family, but it also serves as a vehicle by which to document the very challenging events that shaped the lives of the people, who, during the early part of the last century, chose to settle in this part of the country." Great Plains Quarterly called it "an intelligent, innovative, and eloquently written family history."

Hard Passage has also been reviewed by Literary Review of Canada', British Journal of Canadian Studies', and Biography.

== Awards ==
- 2008 Ottawa Book Award - shortlist
