= Fleet, Alberta =

Fleet
- Hamlet
- Location of Fleet Fleet (Canada)
- Coordinates: 52°09′12″N 111°43′48″W
- Country: Canada
- Province: Alberta
- Region: Central Alberta
- Census division: 7
- Municipal district: County of Paintearth No. 18

Government
  - Type: Unincorporated
  - Governing body: County of Paintearth No. 18 Council, Mayor: Gordon Weeks

Population (1991)
  - Total: 28
- Time zone: UTC−06:00 (Alberta Time)
- Area codes: 403, 587, 825

Fleet is a hamlet in central Alberta, Canada within the County of Paintearth No. 18. It is located on the north side of Highway 12, approximately 141 kilometres (88 mi) east of Red Deer.

== Demographics ==
Population history of Fleet
Year	Pop.	±%
1941	37	—
1951	71	+91.9%
1956	87	+22.5%
1961	79	−9.2%
1966	65	−17.7%
1971	47	−27.7%
1976	39	−17.0%
1981	39	+0.0%
1986	39	+0.0%
1991	28	−28.2%
Source: Statistics Canada

Fleet recorded a population of 28 in the 1991 Census of Population conducted by Statistics Canada.

== See also ==
- List of communities in Alberta
- List of hamlets in Alberta
