= Consort, Alberta =

Consort
- Village
- Village of Consort
- Motto: Village of Opportunity
- Location in Special Area No. 4

- Location in Alberta Consort (Canada)
- Coordinates: 52°00′26″N 110°45′59″W
- Country: Canada
- Province: Alberta
- Planning region: Red Deer
- Special Area: No. 4
- Incorporated
  - Village: September 23, 1912

Government
  - Mayor: Mike Beier
  - Governing body: Consort Village Council

Area (2021)
  - Land: 3.02 km^{2} (1.17 sq mi)
- Elevation: 740 m (2,430 ft)

Population (2021)
  - Total: 644
  - Density: 213/km^{2} (550/sq mi)
- Time zone: UTC−06:00 (Alberta Time)
- Postal code span: T0C 1B0
- Highways: Highway 12; Highway 41; Highway 886
- Website: consort.ca

Consort /ˈkɒnsərt/ is a village in eastern Alberta, Canada. It is at the intersection of Highway 12 and Highway 41, approximately 250 kilometres (155 mi) southeast of Edmonton, 252 kilometres (157 mi) northeast of Calgary, and 283 kilometres (176 mi) west of Saskatoon. The Saskatchewan border is approximately 60 kilometres (37 mi) to the east.

It is located in Special Area No. 4.

== History ==
Consort was established as a village on September 23, 1912.

== Demographics ==
In the 2021 Census of Population conducted by Statistics Canada, the Village of Consort had a population of 644 living in 262 of its 300 total private dwellings, a change of −11.7% from its 2016 population of 729. With a land area of 3.02 km^{2} (1.17 sq mi), it had a population density of 213.2/km^{2} (552.3/sq mi) in 2021.

In the 2016 Census of Population conducted by Statistics Canada, the Village of Consort recorded a population of 729 living in 280 of its 310 total private dwellings, a 5.8% change from its 2011 population of 689. With a land area of 3.05 km^{2} (1.18 sq mi), it had a population density of 239.0/km^{2} (619.0/sq mi) in 2016.

Consort's 2012 municipal census counted a population of 722.

== Economy ==
The primary industries are farming, ranching and oil production.

== Media ==
The local weekly newspaper, The Consort Enterprise, has been published since 1912.

== Notable people ==
- k.d. lang, Grammy and Juno award winning singer-songwriter
- Arthur Kroeger, civil servant for whom the Arthur Kroeger College of Public Affairs is named
- Damien Kurek, Conservative MP for Battle River-Crowfoot 2019-2025
- Riley Nash, professional hockey player for the Boston Bruins and Columbus Blue Jackets

== See also ==
- List of communities in Alberta
- List of villages in Alberta
