= Arthur Kroeger =

- Born: September 7, 1932; Naco, Alberta, Canada
- Died: May 9, 2008 (aged 75); Ottawa, Ontario, Canada
- Occupation: civil servant
- Awards: Order of Canada

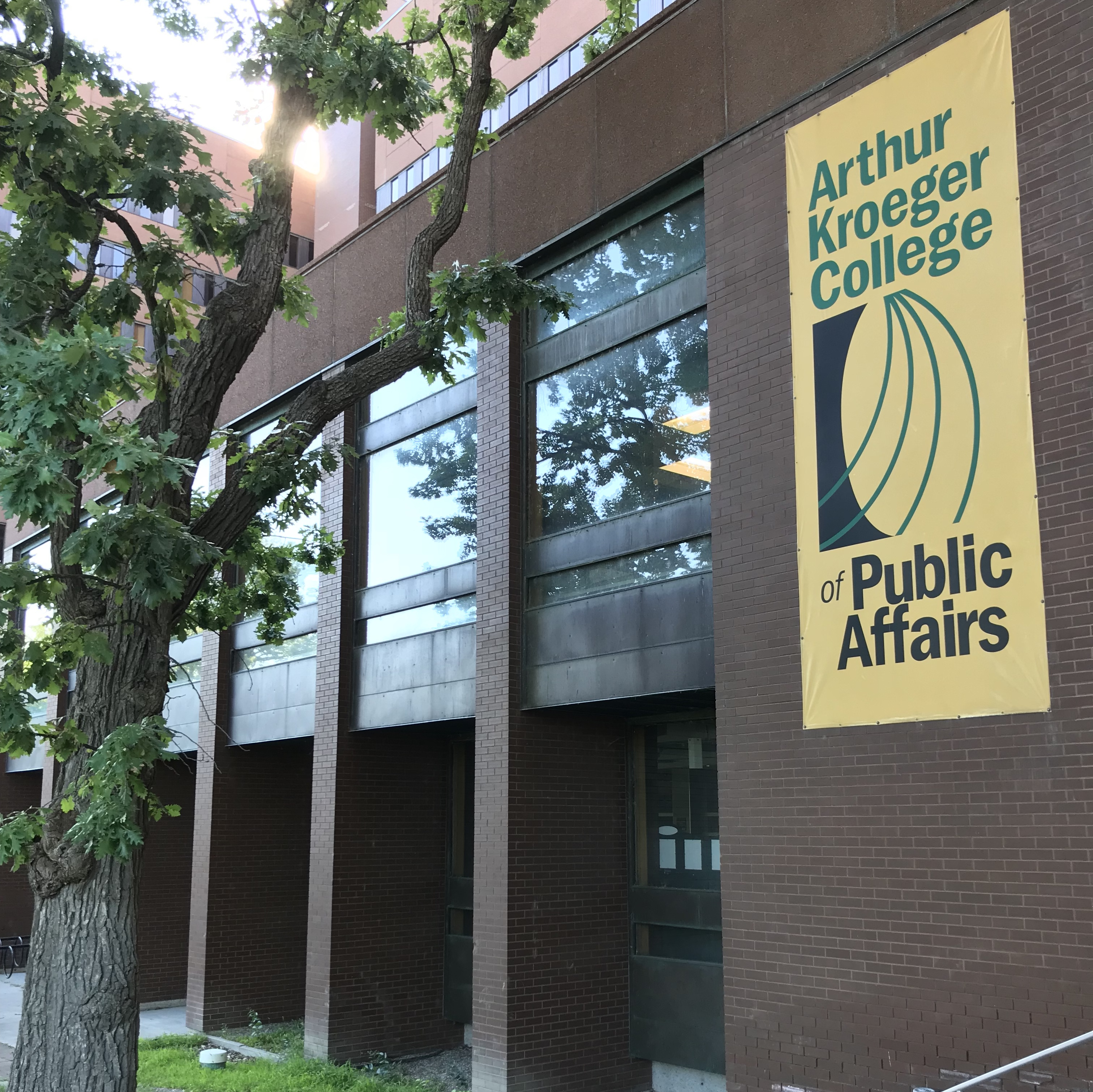
Picture of Arthur Kroeger College of Public Affairs at the Loeb Building, Carleton University, Ottawa, ON

Arthur Kroeger, CC (September 7, 1932 – May 9, 2008) was a Canadian academic and civil servant, who was referred to as the "dean of deputy ministers".

Born on a farm in Naco, Alberta (now a ghost town), Kroeger was descended from Mennonites who emigrated from Russia. He received a BA in 1955 from the University of Alberta and was a Rhodes Scholar. In 1958, he joined the Department of External Affairs and served in Geneva, New Delhi, Washington, and Ottawa. He was deputy minister of the following ministries: Indian and Northern Affairs (1975–1977); Transport Canada (1979–1983); Regional Industrial Expansion (1985–1986); Energy, Mines and Resources (1986–1988); and Employment and Immigration Canada (1988–1992). He retired from public service in 1992.

From 1993 to 1994, he was a visiting professor at the University of Toronto. From 1993 to 1999, he was a visiting fellow at Queen's University.

From 1993 to 2002, he was Chancellor of Carleton University. Carleton also named the Arthur Kroeger College of Public Affairs, the school for the university's undergraduate Bachelor of Public Affairs and Policy Management program and Bachelor of Global and International Studies programme, in Kroeger's honour.

In 1989 he was made an Officer of the Order of Canada and was promoted to Companion in 2000.

He is the author of Hard Passage: A Mennonite Family's Long Journey from Russia to Canada (University of Alberta Press, ISBN 0-88864-473-6), a non-fiction exploration of his Mennonite family's history, spanning three generations in Russian Ukraine, the Soviet Union, and finally in Canada.

In 1966, he married Gay (Gabrielle) Sellers, a fellow Canadian whom he met in England; they had two daughters. She died in 1979. Kroeger's second spouse was Huguette Labelle.

On May 9, 2008, Kroeger died at the Élisabeth Bruyère Health Centre in Ottawa with his family by his side.

Academic offices
Preceded by Pauline Jewett	Chancellor of Carleton University; 1993–2002	Succeeded by Ray Hnatyshyn
