= Coronation, Alberta =

Coronation
- Town
- Town of Coronation
- Motto: A royal town on the move
- Location of Coronation in Alberta
- Coordinates: 52°05′16″N 111°26′00″W
- Country: Canada
- Province: Alberta
- Region: Central Alberta
- Census division: 7
- Incorporated
  - Village: December 16, 1911
  - Town: April 29, 1912
- Founder: Canadian Pacific Railway
- Named for: Coronation of George V and Mary

Government
  - Mayor: Colten Brigley
  - Governing body: Coronation Town Council

Area (2021)
  - Land: 3.57 km^{2} (1.38 sq mi)
- Elevation: 790 m (2,590 ft)

Population (2021)
  - Total: 868
  - Density: 243.1/km^{2} (630/sq mi)
- Time zone: UTC−06:00 (Alberta Time)
- Postal code span: T0C 1C0
- Area codes: +1-403, +1-587
- Highways: Highway 12; Highway 872
- Waterways: Ribstone Creek
- Website: www.coronation.ca

Coronation is a town in east-central Alberta, Canada that is surrounded by the County of Paintearth No. 18. It is located at the intersection of Highway 12 and Highway 872, approximately 100 kilometres (62 mi) west of the Saskatchewan border.

== History ==
Coronation was incorporated as a village on December 16, 1911, the year George V came to the throne hence its chosen name, then was officially declared a town on April 29, 1912. After moving south from the Haneyville, some distance north of its present location to be congruent with rail lines, Coronation was expected to be a hub town. However, larger towns such as Calgary and Red Deer began to evolve into cities and Coronation was forgotten in that regard.

Relying on its farming population, Coronation eventually erected three grain elevators which remained landmarks until their destruction in the summer of 2002. Other landmarks include the water tower that was remodeled in the late 1990s, the caboose that is painted a regal red, and the lighted crown at the town's entrance that was built by a team of Hutterites in the early 2000s.

== Geography ==
=== Climate ===
Coronation experiences a humid continental climate (Köppen climate classification Dfb).

Climate data for Coronation, Alberta (1991–2020 normals, extremes 1944–present)
Month	Jan	Feb	Mar	Apr	May	Jun	Jul	Aug	Sep	Oct	Nov	Dec	Year
Record high humidex	12.6	10.0	24.9	28.7	41.4	36.7	40.9	38.7	34.9	28.7	23.1	14.1	41.4
Record high °C (°F)	13.4 (56.1)	10.6 (51.1)	25.4 (77.7)	30.5 (86.9)	34.2 (93.6)	37.0 (98.6)	37.2 (99.0)	37.9 (100.2)	35.0 (95.0)	29.1 (84.4)	23.5 (74.3)	13.9 (57.0)	37.9 (100.2)
Mean daily maximum °C (°F)	−8.0 (17.6)	−6.0 (21.2)	−0.5 (31.1)	9.6 (49.3)	16.8 (62.2)	20.4 (68.7)	23.8 (74.8)	23.4 (74.1)	17.9 (64.2)	9.7 (49.5)	−0.2 (31.6)	−6.6 (20.1)	8.4 (47.0)
Daily mean °C (°F)	−13.4 (7.9)	−11.6 (11.1)	−5.7 (21.7)	3.0 (37.4)	9.5 (49.1)	13.7 (56.7)	16.6 (61.9)	15.8 (60.4)	10.3 (50.5)	3.0 (37.4)	−5.5 (22.1)	−11.9 (10.6)	2.0 (35.6)
Mean daily minimum °C (°F)	−18.8 (−1.8)	−17.1 (1.2)	−11.2 (11.8)	−3.5 (25.7)	2.2 (36.0)	7.0 (44.6)	9.3 (48.7)	8.2 (46.8)	2.7 (36.9)	−3.8 (25.2)	−10.7 (12.7)	−17.2 (1.0)	−4.4 (24.1)
Record low °C (°F)	−44.4 (−47.9)	−41.9 (−43.4)	−39.8 (−39.6)	−27.8 (−18.0)	−13.9 (7.0)	−3.3 (26.1)	0.4 (32.7)	−4.6 (23.7)	−13.3 (8.1)	−26.5 (−15.7)	−36.5 (−33.7)	−43.6 (−46.5)	−44.4 (−47.9)
Record low wind chill	−59.8	−56.1	−51.0	−37.6	−19.2	−6.0	0.0	−6.6	−14.9	−35.2	−49.5	−56.6	−59.8
Average precipitation mm (inches)	12.2 (0.48)	9.3 (0.37)	12.8 (0.50)	25.4 (1.00)	38.7 (1.52)	68.5 (2.70)	60.8 (2.39)	43.1 (1.70)	28.5 (1.12)	16.8 (0.66)	14.6 (0.57)	8.6 (0.34)	339.3 (13.35)
Average rainfall mm (inches)	0.6 (0.02)	0.2 (0.01)	1.9 (0.07)	11.0 (0.43)	38.4 (1.51)	70.1 (2.76)	72.3 (2.85)	56.9 (2.24)	33.0 (1.30)	8.0 (0.31)	1.8 (0.07)	0.5 (0.02)	294.7 (11.59)
Average snowfall cm (inches)	23.7 (9.3)	18.1 (7.1)	23.7 (9.3)	18.0 (7.1)	3.6 (1.4)	0.0 (0.0)	0.0 (0.0)	0.0 (0.0)	2.7 (1.1)	9.3 (3.7)	15.5 (6.1)	24.3 (9.6)	138.9 (54.7)
Average precipitation days (≥ 0.2 mm)	9.7	7.5	7.6	9.0	10.6	14.6	12.6	10.1	9.1	8.3	9.0	8.4	116.5
Average rainy days (≥ 0.2 mm)	0.58	0.29	1.6	4.7	9.5	13.3	12.9	11.4	8.3	4.2	1.4	0.52	68.5
Average snowy days (≥ 0.2 cm)	9.9	8.3	7.9	5.4	1.1	0.0	0.0	0.0	1.0	2.8	6.7	9.5	52.6
Average relative humidity (%) (at 3pm)	74.6	71.7	63.8	45.3	39.6	48.1	45.4	42.8	43.7	50.3	68.8	74.3	55.7
Source: Environment Canada(rain/rain days, snow/snow days 1971–2000)

== Demographics ==
In the 2021 Census of Population conducted by Statistics Canada, the Town of Coronation had a population of 868 living in 399 of its 485 total private dwellings, a change of −7.7% from its 2016 population of 940. With a land area of 3.57 km^{2} (1.38 sq mi), it had a population density of 243.1/km^{2} (629.7/sq mi) in 2021.

In the 2016 Census of Population conducted by Statistics Canada, the Town of Coronation recorded a population of 940 living in 405 of its 442 total private dwellings, a −0.7% change from its 2011 population of 947. With a land area of 3.62 km^{2} (1.40 sq mi), it had a population density of 259.7/km^{2} (672.5/sq mi) in 2016.

== Economy ==
The economy is supported primarily by farming, ranching, and the oil patch.

== Culture ==
Coronation hosts a rodeo every June that includes calf roping, barrel racing, bull riding and chuckwagon events. The rodeo also features a parade and a pancake breakfast.

Coronation also hosts the Coronation Town and Country Fair, which includes exhibits such as academic displays, botanical achievements and artistic entries.

== Education ==
The Clearview School District operates Coronation School within the town, which had 374 students in 2009.

== Media ==
The East Central Alberta Review is the local newspaper that provides coverage for Coronation.

== Notable people ==
- Travis Brigley - former NHL player
- Barbara Clark - bronze medalist in swimming
- Melody Davidson - Olympic gold medalist, head coach of Canadian women's hockey team
- Stuart Gillard - film director
- Doug Griffiths - author and former politician
- Dwayne Zinger - former NHL player

== See also ==
- Royal eponyms in Canada
